= Australia women's national soccer team results (2000–2009) =

The Australia women's national soccer team results for the period 2000 to 2009 inclusive.

== Match results ==
Win Draw Loss Cancelled or Abandoned

=== 2000 ===
7 January 2000 Australia Cup	Australia	0–2	Sweden	Sydney, Australia
		Report	Andersson 15'; Ljungberg 26'	Stadium: North Sydney Oval

10 January 2000 Australia Cup	Australia	3–0	Czech Republic	Melbourne, Australia
	Tann-Darby 59'; Murray 60'; Black 86'	Report		Stadium: Lakeside Stadium

13 January 2000 Australia Cup	Australia	1–3	United States	Adelaide, Australia
	Forman 74'	Report	Kester 13'; Slaton 34'; Wagner 81'	Stadium: Hindmarsh Stadium

31 May 2000 Pacific Cup	Australia	1–0	Japan	Canberra, Australia
	Duus 64'	Report		Stadium: Bruce Stadium; Attendance: 3,345

2 June 2000 Pacific Cup	Australia	1–1 (4–5 p)	China	Sydney, Australia
	Garriock 81'	Report	Sun Wen 3'	Stadium: Sydney Football Stadium; Attendance: 10,049
	Penalties
	Garriock (penalty scored); Forman (penalty scored); Wilson (penalty scored); Tann-Darby (penalty missed); Salisbury (penalty scored)		(penalty scored) (penalty scored) (penalty scored) (penalty scored); (penalty scored) Sun Wen

4 June 2000 Pacific Cup	Australia	0–2	Canada	Sydney, Australia
		Report	Sinclair 32'; Burtini 43'	Stadium: Campbelltown Stadium; Attendance: 3,947

7 June 2000 Pacific Cup	Australia	4–0	New Zealand	Newcastle, Australia
	Black 7', 21', 30'; Hughes 25'	Report		Stadium: Hunter Region Athletics Centre

11 June 2000 Pacific Cup	Australia	0–1	United States	Newcastle, Australia
		Report	MacMillan 79' (pen.)	Stadium: Breakers Stadium

8 August 2000 Friendly	North Korea	2–0	Australia	Pyongyang, North Korea
	Song Ok Jo 4'; Sol Yong Suk 68'	Report		Stadium: Yanggakdo Stadium; Attendance: ~15,000

11 August 2000 Friendly	North Korea	2–1	Australia	Pyongyang, North Korea
	Song Ok Jo 68'; Ri Kyong Ae 90+2'	Report	Forman 81'	Stadium: Yanggakdo Stadium; Attendance: ~10,000

14 August 2000 Friendly	China	3–0	Australia	Yangzhou, China
	Liu 30'; Sun Wen 77'; Jin Yan 85'	Report		Attendance: 8,000

17 August 2000 Friendly	China	0–0 (4–5 p)	Australia	Shanghai, China
		Report		Attendance: ~20,000
	Penalties
	(penalty scored) (penalty scored); Pan Lina (penalty missed) (penalty scored) (penalty scored)		(penalty scored) Garriock; (penalty scored) Forman; (penalty scored) Tann-Darby; (penalty scored) Small; (penalty scored) Peita-Claire Hepperlin

13 September 2000 Olympic Games	Australia	0–3	Germany	Canberra, Australia
		Report	Grings 39'; Wiegmann 70'; Lingor 90+'	Stadium: Bruce Stadium; Attendance: 24,800; Referee: Bola Abidoye (Nigeria)

16 September 2000 Olympic Games	Australia	1–1	Sweden	Sydney, Australia
	Salisbury 57'	Report	Andersson 66' (pen.)	Stadium: Sydney Football Stadium; Attendance: 33,600; Referee: Sonia Denoncourt (Canada)

19 September 2000 Olympic Games	Australia	1–2	Brazil	Sydney, Australia
	Hughes 33'	Report	Raquel 56'; Kátia 64'	Stadium: Sydney Football Stadium; Attendance: 29,400; Referee: Vibeke Karlsen (Norway)

=== 2001 ===
11 January 2001 Australia Cup	Australia	2–1	France	Coffs Harbour, Australia
	Revell 47'; Salisbury 49'	Report	Lattaf 66'	Stadium: Coffs Harbour International Stadium; Attendance: 5,118; Referee: Sheena Storrie

14 January 2001 Australia Cup	Australia	1–1	France	Lismore, Australia
	Revell 80'	Report	Mugneret-Béghée 88'	Stadium: Oakes Oval; Attendance: 2,350; Referee: Tammy Ogston

17 January 2001 Australia Cup	Australia	1–0	France	Gold Coast, Australia
	Mann 55'	Report		Stadium: Carrara Stadium; Attendance: 1,422; Referee: Tammy Ogston

=== 2002 ===
13 January 2002 Australia Cup	Australia	1–0	South Korea	Wagga Wagga, Australia
	Mann 72'	Report		Stadium: Robertson Oval; Attendance: 3,712

16 January 2002 Australia Cup	Australia	1–0	South Korea	Albury, Australia
	Peters 32'	Report		Stadium: Lavington Sports Ground; Attendance: 2,074

19 January 2002 Australia Cup	Australia	4–1	South Korea	Bendigo, Australia
	Mann 29'; Golebiowski 66'; Black 75'; Garriock 79'	Report	Suk Jung Jung 41'	Stadium: Tom Flood Sports Oval; Attendance: 2,479

3 April 2002 Tournoi International de France	Australia	0–0	Canada	Poitiers, France
		Report		Stadium: Stade de la Pépinière

6 April 2002 Tournoi International de France	Australia	1–1	Japan	Angoulême, France
	Golebiowski 31'	Report	Yoshie Kasajima 89'	Stadium: Stade Lebon

9 April 2002 Tournoi International de France	France	1–0	Australia	Limoges, France
	Pichon 37'	Report		Stadium: Stade municipal de Beaublanc; Attendance: 3,000

26 September 2002 Friendly	Canada	2–0	Australia	Burnaby, Canada
	Morneau 62', 84'	Report		Stadium: Swangard Stadium

28 September 2002 Friendly	Canada	0–1	Australia	Victoria, Canada
		Report	Golebiowski 64'	Stadium: Centennial Stadium

2 October 2002 Nike U.S. Cup	United States	4–0	Australia	Cary, United States
	Chastain 23'; Parlow 34', 58'; MacMillan 74'	Report		Stadium: SAS Stadium; Attendance: 2,661

6 October 2002 Nike U.S. Cup	Australia	2–0	Russia	Cary, United States
	Golebiowski 12'; Peters 43'	Report		Stadium: SAS Stadium

9 October 2002 Nike U.S. Cup	Australia	0–1	Italy	Cary, United States
		Report	Camporese 90'	Stadium: SAS Stadium

=== 2003 ===
26 January 2003 Australia Cup	Australia	2–0 (Note: match abandoned after 77' (with result standing) following an incident between a Korean official and an assistant referee.)	South Korea	Canberra, Australia
	Golebiowski 10', 76'	Report		Stadium: McKellar Park; Referee: Tammy Ogston

29 January 2003 Australia Cup	Australia	2–0	Mexico	Canberra, Australia
	Mann 9', 45'	Report		Stadium: McKellar Park; Referee: Tammy Ogston

1 February 2003 Australia Cup	Australia	1–3	Sweden	Canberra, Australia
	Golebiowski 38'	Report	Olsson 40'; Tornqvist 49'; Bengtsson 73'	Stadium: McKellar Park; Referee: Tammy Ogston

5 April 2003 OFC Women's Championship; World Cup qualifier	Australia	19–0	Samoa	Canberra, Australia
	Peters 5', 35', 50', 79'; Golebiowski 16', 42', 46', 61'; Davies 18'; Small 41', 78'; Mann 53', 58', 85', 87'; Wainwright 55'; Slatyer 56', 57'; Garriock 72'	Report		Stadium: McKellar Park; Attendance: 750; Referee: Rajendra Singh (Fiji)

7 April 2003 OFC Women's Championship; World Cup qualifier	Australia	11–0	Cook Islands	Canberra, Australia
	Crawford 41', 48'; Davies 11'; Alagich 34', 62' (pen.); Karp 37', 81'; Hohnke 59'; Small 65'; Amy Wilson 71', 82'	Report		Stadium: McKellar Park; Attendance: 600; Referee: Salaiau Sosongan (Papua New Guinea)

9 April 2003 OFC Women's Championship; World Cup qualifier	Australia	13–0	Papua New Guinea	Canberra, Australia
	Mann 5', 41', 49', 55'; Peters 17'; Salisbury 29', 81' (pen.); Alagich 46'; Golebiowski 59', 71'; Garriock 60', 78', 89'	Report		Stadium: McKellar Park; Attendance: 600; Referee: Rajendra Singh (Fiji)

13 April 2003 OFC Women's Championship; World Cup qualifier	Australia	2–0	New Zealand	Canberra, Australia
	Peters 24'; Small 49'	Report		Stadium: McKellar Park; Attendance: 2,200; Referee: Rajendra Singh (Fiji)

25 July 2003 Friendly	Australia	0–0	South Korea	Sendai, Japan
		Report		Stadium: Yurtec Stadium Sendai; Attendance: 1,000; Referee: Sachiko Baba (Japan)

27 July 2003 Friendly	Japan	0–0	Australia	Sendai, Japan
		Report		Stadium: Yurtec Stadium Sendai; Attendance: 1,768; Referee: Kyung-Hwa Han (South Korea)

28 August 2003 Friendly	China	2–0	Australia	Jinan, China
	Teng Wei 15'; Pan Lina 52'	Report		Stadium: Shandong Sport Centre Stadium; Attendance: 5,000

31 August 2003 Friendly	China	2–0	Australia	Qingdao, China
	Xie Caixia 4'; Teng Wei 15'	Report		Attendance: 10,000

4 September 2003 Friendly	England	1–0	Australia	Burnley, England
	Yankey 1'	Report		Stadium: Turf Moor; Attendance: 4,349

6 September 2003 Friendly	Scotland	0–1	Australia	Livingston, Scotland
		Report	Salisbury 5'	Stadium: City Stadium; Attendance: 220; Referee: Ian Frickleton (Scotland)

14 September 2003 Friendly	Canada	2–0	Australia	Kingston, Canada
	Hooper 71'; Wilkinson 73'	Report		Stadium: Richardson Memorial Stadium; Attendance: 10,068

21 September 2003 World Cup	Australia	1–2	Russia	Carson, United States
	Golebiowski 38'	Report	Alagich 39' (o.g.); Fomina 89'	Stadium: Home Depot Center; Attendance: 8,500; Referee: Bola Abidoye (Nigeria)

25 September 2003 World Cup	China	1–1	Australia	Carson, United States
	Bai 46'	Report	Garriock 28'	Stadium: Home Depot Center; Attendance: 13,929; Referee: Katriina Elovirta (Finland)

28 September 2003 World Cup	Ghana	2–1	Australia	Portland, United States
	Sackey 34', 39'	Report	Garriock 61'	Stadium: PGE Park; Attendance: 19,132; Referee: Xonam Agboyi (Togo)

=== 2004 ===
18 February 2004 Australia Cup	Australia	2–0	New Zealand	Brisbane, Australia
	Mann 26'; Walsh 30'	Report		Stadium: QE II Stadium; Referee: Jacqui Melksham

22 February 2004 Australia Cup	Australia	Abandoned (Note: match abandoned at half time due to adverse weather, with a declaration of a 0–0 result (although North Korea were leading 0–1).)	North Korea	Brisbane, Australia
		Report		Stadium: QE II Stadium

24 February 2004 Australia Cup	Australia	0–0	China	Brisbane, Australia
		Report		Stadium: QE II Stadium; Referee: Krystyna Szokolai

4 March 2004 Olympic Qualifiers	Australia	10–0	Papua New Guinea	Ba, Fiji
	Gill 5', 16', 36'; De Vanna 23', 33'; Walsh 30'; Peters 38'; Selin Kuralay 52'; Mann 65', 77'	Report		Stadium: Govind Park; Attendance: 300; Referee: Bentla D'Coth (India)

6 March 2004 Olympic Qualifiers	Fiji	0–7	Australia	Ba, Fiji
		Report	Harch 3', 5', 49'; Mann 18', 59'; Foster 33'; Gill 90'	Stadium: Govind Park; Attendance: 600; Referee: Dongqing Zhang (China)

2 July 2004 Friendly	China	1–1	Australia	Beijing, China
	Duan Fang Fang 74'	Report	De Vanna 34'

7 July 2004 Friendly	Mexico	1–2	Australia	Mexico City, Mexico
	Domínguez 81'	Report	Walsh 26', 31'	Stadium: Estadio Azteca; Attendance: 20,000; Referee: Quetzalli Alvarado Godinez (Mexico)

10 July 2004 Friendly	Mexico	2–0	Australia	Guadalajara, Mexico
	Domínguez 81', 90'	Report		Stadium: Estadio Jalisco; Referee: Virginia Tovar Diaz (Mexico)

21 July 2004 Friendly	United States	3–1	Australia	Blaine, United States
	Boxx 56'; Hamm 76'; Wambach 81'	Report	Small 5'	Stadium: National Sports Center; Attendance: 10,276; Referee: Terry Vaughn (United States)

6 August 2004 Friendly	Australia	1–0	Mexico	Athens, Greece
	Walsh 36'	Report

11 August 2004 Olympic Games	Brazil	1–0	Australia	Thessaloniki, Greece
	Marta 36'	Report		Stadium: Kaftanzoglio Stadium; Attendance: 25,152; Referee: Dagmar Damková (Czech Republic)

14 August 2004 Olympic Games	Greece	0–1	Australia	Heraklio, Greece
		Report	Garriock 27'	Stadium: Pankritio Stadium; Attendance: 8,857; Referee: Bentla D'Coth (India)

17 August 2004 Olympic Games	United States	1–1	Australia	Thessaloniki, Greece
	Lilly 19'	Report	Peters 82'	Stadium: Kaftanzoglio Stadium; Attendance: 3,320; Referee: Christina Ionescu (Romania)

20 August 2004 Olympic Games	Sweden	2–1	Australia	Volos, Greece
	Ljungberg 25'; Larsson 30'	Report	de Vanna 48'	Stadium: Panthessaliko Stadium; Attendance: 4,811; Referee: Dagmar Damková (Czech Republic)

=== 2005 ===
28 January 2005 Four Nations Tournament	Germany	0–1	Australia	Quanzhou, China
		Report	De Vanna 53'	Attendance: 2,500; Referee: Zhang Dong Qing (China)

30 January 2005 Four Nations Tournament	China	3–0	Australia	Quanzhou, China
	Pan Lina 61'; Han Duan 63'; Ren Liping 65'	Report

1 February 2005 Four Nations Tournament	Russia	0–5	Australia	Quanzhou, China
		Report	Garriock 35'; De Vanna 27'; Gill 51', 62'; Salisbury 85' (pen.)

26 March 2005 Friendly	Australia	0–2	Japan	Sydney, Australia
		Report	Ando 47'; Yanagita 62'	Stadium: Sydney Olympic Stadium

29 March 2005 Friendly	Australia	2–1	Japan	Sydney, Australia
	Peters 20'; Kuralay 31'	Report	Miyama 81'	Stadium: Seymour Shaw Park

16 July 2005 Friendly	China	1–2	Australia	Tianjin, China
	Ji Ting 60'	Report	Gill 27'; Peters 90'	Stadium: Minyuan Stadium; Attendance: 4,500

19 July 2005 Friendly	China	2–0	Australia	Tianjin, China
	Zhang Ying 45'; Han Duan 56'	Report		Stadium: Minyuan Stadium; Attendance: 7,000

23 July 2005 Friendly	Japan	4–2	Australia	Tokyo, Japan
	Nagasato 27', 44'; Ohno 43'; Tomoe Sakai 67'	Report	De Vanna 14'; Peters 23' (pen.)	Attendance: 4,191

26 July 2005 Friendly	South Korea	0–0	Australia	Jeonju, South Korea
		Report

28 July 2005 Friendly	South Korea	3–0	Australia	Jeonju, South Korea
	unknown 56' unknown 58' unknown 67'	Report

16 October 2005 Friendly	United States	0–0	Australia	Fullerton, United States
		Report		Stadium: Titan Stadium; Attendance: 5,394; Referee: Kari Seitz (United States); Jennifer Bennett (United States)

19 October 2005 Friendly	Mexico	0–2	Australia	El Paso, United States
		Report	Walsh 86'; Shipard 90'	Stadium: Patriot Stadium; Referee: Jennifer Bennett (United States)

25 November 2005 Friendly	Australia	0–0	China	Gosford, Australia
		Report		Stadium: Central Coast Stadium; Attendance: 1,900; Referee: Krystyna Szokolai

3 December 2005 Friendly	Australia	0–0	China	Sydney, Australia
		Report		Stadium: Sydney Football Stadium; Referee: Tammy Ogston

=== 2006 ===
25 May 2006 Friendly	Australia	2–1	Mexico	Melbourne, Australia
	Gill 75'; Salisbury 84'	Report	Ocampo 13'	Stadium: MCG; Referee: Tammy Ogston

28 May 2006 Friendly	Australia	3–0	Mexico	Melbourne, Australia
	Burgess 58'; Peters 33'; De Vanna 90'	Report		Stadium: Lakeside Stadium

30 May 2006 Friendly	Australia	4–0	Mexico	Melbourne, Australia
	Munoz 44', 45', 75'; Walsh 60'	Report		Stadium: SS Anderson Reserve

16 June 2006 Friendly	China	2–1	Australia	Shanghai, China
	unknown 28' (o.g.); Pu Wei 75' (pen.)	Report	Walsh 48'	Stadium: Shanghai FA Training Centre

19 June 2006 Friendly	China	2–0	Australia	Shanghai, China
	unknown 38' unknown 44'	Report		Stadium: Oriental Green Boat Holiday Village

16 July 2006 Asian Cup; World Cup qualifier	Australia	4–0	South Korea	Adelaide, Australia
	Shin Sun-Nam 30' (o.g.); Walsh 66'; Munoz 75'; De Vanna 87'	Report		Stadium: Hindmarsh Stadium; Attendance: 3,000; Referee: Bentla D'Coth (India)

18 July 2006 Asian Cup; World Cup qualifier	Australia	2–0	Myanmar	Adelaide, Australia
	Shipard 31'; De Vanna 77'	Report		Stadium: Hindmarsh Stadium; Attendance: 2,000; Referee: Dongqing Zhang (China)

22 July 2006 Asian Cup; World Cup qualifier	Australia	0–0	North Korea	Adelaide, Australia
		Report		Stadium: Hindmarsh Stadium; Attendance: 4,000; Referee: Mayumi Oiwa (Japan)

24 July 2006 Asian Cup; World Cup qualifier	Australia	5–0	Thailand	Adelaide, Australia
	Ferguson 3'; Burgess 27'; Walsh 53'; Gill 62'; De Vanna 81'	Report		Stadium: Hindmarsh Stadium; Attendance: 400; Referee: Hong Eun-Ah (South Korea)

27 July 2006 Asian Cup; World Cup qualifier	Australia	2–0	Japan	Adelaide, Australia
	Munoz 10'; Peters 45'	Report		Stadium: Hindmarsh Stadium; Attendance: 4,000; Referee: Jenny Palmqvist (Sweden)

30 July 2006 Asian Cup Final; World Cup qualifier	Australia	2–2 (a.e.t.) (2–4 p)	China	Adelaide, Australia
	Munoz 29'; Peters 33'	Report	Han Duan 68'; Ma Xiaoxu 73'	Stadium: Hindmarsh Stadium; Attendance: 5,000; Referee: Mayumi Oiwa (Japan)
	Penalties
	McCallum (penalty missed); Shipard (penalty scored); Peters (penalty missed); Ferguson (penalty scored)		(penalty scored) Ma Xiaoxu; (penalty scored) Bi Yan; (penalty scored) Li Jie; (penalty scored) Han Duan

29 October 2006 Peace Queen Cup	Netherlands	0–1	Australia	Gimhae, South Korea
		Report	Walsh 65'	Stadium: Gimhae Stadium; Attendance: 13,800; Referee: Cha Sung Mi (South Korea)

31 October 2006 Peace Queen Cup	Australia	0–2	United States	Cheonan, South Korea
		Report	Lilly 20'; Kai 35'	Stadium: Cheonan Stadium; Attendance: 8,215; Referee: Kim Eun Jin (South Korea)

2 November 2006 Peace Queen Cup	Australia	1–2	Denmark	Suwon, South Korea
	Munoz 69'	Report	Juliussen 13'; Rasmussen 81'	Stadium: Suwon World Cup Stadium; Attendance: 2,350; Referee: Shin Hwa Yeon (South Korea)

19 November 2006 Friendly	Japan	1–0	Australia	Tokyo, Japan
	Nagasato 51'	Report		Stadium: Fukuda-Denshi Arena; Attendance: 4,093; Referee: Deng Junxia (China)

=== 2007 ===
21 February 2007 Olympic qualifiers	Australia	2–0	Myanmar	Taipei, Taiwan
	Walsh 9', 55'	Report		Stadium: Zhongshan Soccer Stadium; Attendance: 300; Referee: Sachiko Baba (Japan)

23 February 2007 Olympic qualifiers	Uzbekistan	0–10	Australia	Taipei, Taiwan
		Report	Gill 3'; Slatyer 14'; Colthorpe 18'; Small 25'; Walsh 27'; Garriock 52'; Davies 57'; McCallum 59', 83'; Harch 75'	Stadium: Zhongshan Soccer Stadium; Referee: Etsuko Fukano (Japan)

25 February 2007 Olympic qualifiers	Chinese Taipei	1–8	Australia	Taipei, Taiwan
	Pei-Wen Tsai 35'	Report	Gill 14', 26', 44', 49', 90'; Walsh 29'; Peters 72'; Small 83'	Stadium: Zhongshan Soccer Stadium; Attendance: 300; Referee: Bentla D'Coth (India)

7 April 2007 Olympic qualifiers	Australia	15–0	Hong Kong	Coffs Harbour, Australia
	Walsh 10', 12'; McCallum 16', 43', 54'; Gill 26', 52', 72', 74', 89'; Peters 33'; Burgess 56'; Small 72'; Salisbury 85', 87'	Report		Stadium: Coffs Harbour International Stadium; Attendance: 1,511; Referee: Mayumi Oiwa (Japan)

15 April 2007 Olympic qualifiers	Chinese Taipei	0–10	Australia	Taipei, Taiwan
		Report	Gill 6', 28', 29'; Walsh 18', 32', 45'; Peters 42', 57'; Salisbury 81'; Burgess 83'	Stadium: Zhongshan Soccer Stadium; Attendance: 600; Referee: Etsuko Fukano (Japan)

3 June 2007 Olympic qualifiers	North Korea	2–0	Australia	Pyongyang, North Korea
	Ri Kum-suk 35', 55' (pen.)	Report		Stadium: Yanggakdo Stadium; Attendance: 3,100; Referee: Huijin Niu (China)

10 June 2007 Olympic qualifiers	Australia	0–2	North Korea	Coffs Harbour, Australia
		Report	Ri Kum-suk 60'; Kim Kyong-hwa 69'	Stadium: Coffs Harbour International Stadium; Attendance: 2,121; Referee: Sachiko Baba (Japan)

19 July 2007 Friendly	Australia	3–0	New Zealand	Coffs Harbour, Australia
	Walsh 57', 70'; Harch 82'	Report

22 July 2007 Friendly	Australia	1–0	New Zealand	Coffs Harbour, Australia
	De Vanna 24'	Report

4 August 2007 Olympic qualifiers	Hong Kong	1–8	Australia	Hong Kong
	Wing Sze Chan 52'	Report	Perry 2'; Rollason 19', 56'; Cooper 53'; Butt 45'; Lai Hing Chin 50', 74' (o.g.); Kingsley 83'	Stadium: Mong Kok Stadium; Attendance: 100; Referee: Mariko Iwaki (Japan)

14 August 2007 Olympic qualifiers	Australia	7–0	Chinese Taipei	Coffs Harbour, Australia
	Munoz 3', 82', 84'; Walsh 25'; Garriock 31'; Peters 60'; Gill 89'	Report		Stadium: Coffs Harbour International Stadium; Attendance: 1,186; Referee: Cha Sung-Mi (South Korea)

16 August 2007 Friendly	China	2–3	Australia	Tianjin, China
	Han Duan 54', 64'	Report	McShea 22'; De Vanna 28'; Walsh 83'	Stadium: Tianjin Olympic Center Stadium

19 August 2007 Friendly	China	1–3	Australia	Tianjin, China
	Pu Wei 90'	Report	Garriock 12'; Munoz 34'; McCallum 51'	Stadium: Tianjin Olympic Center Stadium; Attendance: 52,000

12 September 2007 World Cup	Australia	4–1	Ghana	Hangzhou, China
	Walsh 15'; De Vanna 57', 81'; Garriock 69'	Report	Amankwa 70'	Stadium: Yellow Dragon Stadium; Attendance: 25,952; Referee: Adriana Correa (Colombia)

15 September 2007 World Cup	Norway	1–1	Australia	Hangzhou, China
	R. Gulbrandsen 5'	Report	De Vanna 83'	Stadium: Yellow Dragon Stadium; Attendance: 33,835; Referee: Niu Huijun (China)

20 September 2007 World Cup	Australia	2–2	Canada	Chengdu, China
	McCallum 53'; Salisbury 90+2'	Report	Tancredi 1'; Sinclair 85'	Stadium: Chengdu Sports Centre; Attendance: 29,300; Referee: Gyöngyi Gaál (Hungary)

23 September 2007 World Cup	Brazil	3–2	Australia	Tianjin, China
	Formiga 4'; Marta 23' (pen.); Cristiane 75'	Report	De Vanna 36'; Colthorpe 68'	Stadium: Tianjin Olympic Center Stadium; Attendance: 35,061; Referee: Christine Beck (Germany)

=== 2008 ===
1 March 2008 Friendly	Australia	2–0	New Zealand	Sunshine Coast, Australia
	Walsh 16'; Burgess 56'	Report		Stadium: Stockland Park

3 March 2008 Friendly	Australia	2–1	New Zealand	Sunshine Coast, Australia
	Gill 22'; Chapman 47'	Report	Kete 30'	Stadium: Stockland Park

5 March 2008 Friendly	Australia	4–2	New Zealand	Sunshine Coast, Australia
	McCallum 9'; Salisbury 58' (pen.85); Polkinghorne 90'	Report	Smith 13'; Moorwood (Bowden) 45'	Stadium: Stockland Park

27 April 2008 Friendly	United States	3–2	Australia	Cary, United States
	Kai 35'; Wambach 49'; Lloyd 90'	Report	Gill 86'; Salisbury 88'	Stadium: WakeMed Soccer Park; Attendance: 3,698; Referee: Margaret Domka (United States)

3 May 2008 Friendly	United States	5–4	Australia	Birmingham, United States
	Tarpley 28', 42'; Wambach 29', 46'; Hucles 90+4'	Report	Whitehill 19' (o.g.); Walsh 49'; Colthorpe 64'; Rampone 69' (o.g.)	Stadium: Legion Field; Attendance: 5,000; Referee: Sandra Serafini (United States)

23 May 2008 Friendly	Australia	2–1	Canada	Sydney, Australia
	Chapman 22'; Munoz 40'	Report	Lang 55'	Stadium: Sydney Football Stadium; Referee: Tammy Ogston

29 May 2008 Asian Cup	Australia	4–0	Chinese Taipei	Ho Chi Minh City, Vietnam
	Garriock 19', 42'; Tristram 51'; De Vanna 82'	Report		Stadium: Thống Nhất Stadium; Attendance: 600; Referee: Ri Hong-sil (North Korea)

31 May 2008 Asian Cup	South Korea	0–2	Australia	Ho Chi Minh City, Vietnam
		Report	Perry 30'; De Vanna 69'	Stadium: Thống Nhất Stadium; Attendance: 500; Referee: Bentla D'Coth (India)

2 June 2008 Asian Cup	Australia	1–3	Japan	Ho Chi Minh City, Vietnam
	Polkinghorne 70'	Report	Ando 8'; Nagasato 33'; Miyama 50'	Stadium: Thống Nhất Stadium; Attendance: 300; Referee: Ri Hong-sil (North Korea)

5 June 2008 Asian Cup	North Korea	3–0	Australia	Ho Chi Minh City, Vietnam
	Ri Kum-Suk 2', 41', 60'	Report		Stadium: Thống Nhất Stadium; Attendance: 2,700; Referee: Pannipar Kamnueng (Thailand)

8 June 2008 Asian Cup – Third Place match	Australia	0–3	Japan	Ho Chi Minh City, Vietnam
		Report	Nagasato 15'; Miyama 78'; Sawa 86'	Stadium: Thống Nhất Stadium; Attendance: 1,200; Referee: Hong Eun-Ah (South Korea)

15 June 2008 Peace Queen Cup	United States	2–1	Australia	Suwon, South Korea
	Kai 35'; Wambach 77'	Report	Garriock 57'	Stadium: Suwon Civil Stadium

17 June 2008 Peace Queen Cup	Italy	0–3	Australia	Suwon, South Korea
		Report	Garriock 66', 68'; Chapman 89'	Stadium: Suwon Civil Stadium

19 June 2008 Peace Queen Cup	Australia	1–0	Brazil	Suwon, South Korea
	Simon 90+2'	Report		Stadium: Suwon Civil Stadium

5 July 2008 Friendly	China	5–0	Australia	Tianjin, China
	Han Duan 7'; Zhang Ying 22'; Li Jie 48' (pen.); Xu Yuan 74', 87'	Report		Stadium: Tianjin Olympic Stadium Auxiliary Field; Attendance: 1,000

12 July 2008 Friendly	Australia	1–0	New Zealand	Sydney, Australia
	Khamis 35'	Report		Stadium: North Sydney Oval; Attendance: 1,604; Referee: Krystyna Szokolai

24 July 2008 Friendly	Japan	3–0	Australia	Kobe, Japan
	Sawa 43'; Nagasato 47'; Maruyama 86' (pen.)	Report		Stadium: Home's Stadium Kobe; Attendance: 9,195; Referee: Sook Hee Kim (South Korea)

9 October 2008 ASEAN Championships	Australia	2–0	Thailand	Ho Chi Minh City, Vietnam
	Balomenos 71', 86'	Report		Stadium: Thanh Long Sports Centre

11 October 2008 ASEAN Championships	Australia	7–0	Philippines	Ho Chi Minh City, Vietnam
	Rollason 34', 53'; Tristram 36', 81'; Sykes 65'; Balomenos 86', 90'	Report		Stadium: Thanh Long Sports Centre

13 October 2008 ASEAN Championships	Singapore	0–6	Australia	Ho Chi Minh City, Vietnam
		Report	Colthorpe 6', 22'; Sykes 51'; Tristram 69'; Balomenos 78'; Mastrantonio 90'	Stadium: Thanh Long Sports Centre

18 October 2008 ASEAN Championships	Australia	5–1	Myanmar	Ho Chi Minh City, Vietnam
	Chapman 3'; Uzunlar 19'; Colthorpe 27' (pen.); Tristram 42'; Carroll 65' (pen.)	Report	unknown 72'	Stadium: Thanh Long Sports Centre

20 October 2008 ASEAN Championship – Final	Vietnam	0–1	Australia	Ho Chi Minh City, Vietnam
		Report	unknown 80' (o.g.)	Stadium: Thanh Long Sports Centre

=== 2009 ===
31 January 2009 Friendly	Australia	2–2	Italy	Sydney, Australia
	De Vanna 55'; Salisbury 65' (pen.)	Report	Conti 58'; Tuttino 78'	Stadium: Parramatta Stadium; Attendance: 2,921; Referee: Jacqui Melksham

7 February 2009 Friendly	Australia	1–5	Italy	Canberra, Australia
	McCallum 64'	Report	Gabbiadini 7'; Panico 10', 58', 81'; Conti 16'	Stadium: Canberra Stadium; Attendance: 2,916; Referee: Sarah Hodson

== See also ==
- Australia women's national soccer team results (1975–1999)
- Australia women's national soccer team results (2010–2019)
- Australia women's national soccer team results (2020–present)
