= 2005–06 in Australian soccer =

Soccer in Australia
- Season: 2005–06

Men's soccer
- A-League Championship: Sydney FC
- A-League Premiership: Adelaide United
- Club World Championship Qualifying Tournament: Sydney FC
- A-League Pre-Season Challenge Cup: Adelaide United

The 2005–06 season was the 37th season of national competitive soccer in Australia and 123rd overall. This was the first season following the formation of the A-League.

== A-League ==
The inaugural 2005–06 A-League season began on 26 August 2005 and ended on 5 March 2006.

=== Regular season ===
Pos	Team	Pld	W	D	L	GF	GA	GD	Pts	Qualification
1	Adelaide United	21	13	4	4	33	25	+8	43	Qualification for 2007 AFC Champions League group stage and Finals series
2	Sydney FC (C)	21	10	6	5	35	28	+7	36	Qualification for 2007 AFC Champions League group stage and Finals series
3	Central Coast Mariners	21	8	8	5	35	28	+7	32	Qualification for Finals series
4	Newcastle Jets	21	9	4	8	27	29	−2	31	Qualification for Finals series
5	Perth Glory	21	8	5	8	34	29	+5	29	
6	Queensland Roar	21	7	7	7	27	22	+5	28	
7	Melbourne Victory	21	7	5	9	26	24	+2	26	
8	New Zealand Knights (Note: New Zealand Knights cannot qualify for the AFC Champions League as they are not recognised as an AFC club.)	21	1	3	17	15	47	−32	6	

Source: ultimatealeague.com
Rules for classification: 1) points; 2) goal difference; 3) number of goals scored.
(C) Champions

=== Finals series ===
Semifinals
1	Adelaide United	2	1	3
2	Sydney FC	2	2	4
3	Central Coast Mariners	1	1	2
4	Newcastle Jets	0	1	1

Preliminary final
1	Adelaide United	0
3	Central Coast Mariners	1

Final
2	Sydney FC	1
3	Central Coast Mariners	0

== A-League Pre-Season Challenge Cup ==
The inaugural 2005 A-League Pre-Season Challenge Cup began on 22 July 2005 and ended on 20 August 2005.

=== Group stage ===
Group A

Pos	Team	Pld	W	D	L	GF	GA	GD	Pts	Qualification or relegation
1	Melbourne Victory	3	1	2	0	2	1	+1	5	Advance to semifinals
2	Perth Glory	3	1	1	1	4	4	0	4	Advance to semifinals
3	Adelaide United	3	0	3	0	3	3	0	3	
4	Newcastle Jets	3	0	2	1	3	4	−1	2	

Group B

Pos	Team	Pld	W	D	L	GF	GA	GD	Pts	Qualification or relegation
1	Sydney FC	3	2	1	0	5	1	+4	7	Advance to semifinals
2	Central Coast Mariners	3	2	0	1	4	3	+1	6	Advance to semifinals
3	Queensland Roar	3	1	1	1	6	3	+3	4	
4	New Zealand Knights	3	0	0	3	1	9	−8	0	

=== Finals ===
Semi-finals
12 August
Melbourne Victory	1
Central Coast Mariners	3
14 August
Sydney FC	0
Perth Glory	1

Final
21 August
Central Coast Mariners	1
Perth Glory	0

== Australian Club World Championship qualifying tournament ==
Round 1 (7 May)
Sydney FC	3
Queensland Roar	0
Central Coast Mariners (pen)	0 (4)
Newcastle Jets	0 (2)
Adelaide United (pen)	0 (4)
Melbourne Victory	0 (1)

Semi-finals (11 May)
Perth Glory	1
Sydney FC	2
Central Coast Mariners	4
Adelaide United	0

Finals (15 May)
Sydney FC	1
Central Coast Mariners	0

== International club competitions ==
=== OFC Club Championship ===
The 2005 OFC Club Championship began on 31 May 2005 and ended on 10 June 2005. Sydney FC entered as winners of the 2005 Australian Club World Championship Qualifying Tournament.

31 May 2005 Group Stage	Sydney FC (Australia)	3–2	(New Zealand) Auckland City	Tahiti
	Ceccoli 32'; Packer 47'; Corica 90+3'	Report	Seaman 37'; Smith 78'	Stadium: Stade Pater; Attendance: 4,000

2 June 2005 Group Stage	Sobou FC (Papua New Guinea)	2–9	(Australia) Sydney FC	Tahiti
	Wate 57'; Daniel 90'	Report	Fyfe 5'; Petrovski 14', 43', 71'; Zdrilic 19', 40', 42'; Brodie 79'; Salazar 82'	Stadium: Stade Pater; Attendance: 3,000

4 June 2005 Group Stage	Sydney FC (Australia)	6–0	(French Polynesia) AS Pirae	Tahiti
	Zdrilic 11', 25', 35', 39'; Buonavoglia 43'; Carney 85'	Report		Stadium: Stade Pater; Attendance: 1,500

7 June 2005 Semi-final	Sydney FC (Australia)	6–0	(Vanuatu) Tafea	Tahiti
	Petrovski 26'; Zdrilic 39'; Talay 44' (pen.); Corica 65', 90'; Salazar 87'	Report		Stadium: Stade Pater; Attendance: 4,000

10 June 2005 Final	Sydney FC (Australia)	2–0	(New Caledonia) AS Magenta	Stade Pater, Tahiti
	Bingley 16'; Zdrilic 59'	Report		Attendance: 4,000

=== FIFA Club World Championship ===
The 2005 FIFA Club World Championship ran from 11 to 18 December 2005. Sydney FC qualified as winners of the 2005 OFC Club Championship.

12 December 2005 Quarterfinal	Sydney (Australia)	0–1	(Costa Rica) Deportivo Saprissa	Toyota, Japan
21:20 AEDT (UTC+11)		Report	Bolaños 47'	Stadium: Toyota Stadium; Attendance: 28,538; Referee: Toru Kamikawa (Japan)

16 December 2005 Fifth Place Play-Off	Al Ahly (Egypt)	1–2	(Australia) Sydney	Tokyo, Japan
21:20 AEDT (UTC+11)	Moteab 45'	Report	Yorke 35'; Carney 66'	Stadium: National Stadium; Attendance: 15,951; Referee: Toru Kamikawa (Japan)

== National teams ==
=== Men's senior ===
==== Friendlies ====
The following is a list of friendlies played by the men's senior national team in 2005–06.

9 October 2006 Friendly	Australia	5–0	Jamaica	London, England
	Bresciano 3'; Thompson 29'; Viduka 48'; Aloisi 58'; Griffiths 85'	Report		Stadium: Craven Cottage; Attendance: 6,570; Referee: Mike Riley (England)

25 May 2006 Friendly	Australia	1–0	Greece	Melbourne, Australia
	Skoko 16'	Report		Stadium: MCG; Attendance: 95,103; Referee: Mike Riley (England)

4 June 2006 Friendly	Netherlands	1–1	Australia	Rotterdam, Netherlands
	van Nistelrooy 9'	Report	54' Cahill	Stadium: De Kuip; Attendance: 49,000; Referee: Mike Dean (England)

8 June 2006 Friendly	Liechtenstein	1–3	Australia	Ulm, Germany
	Neill 8' (o.g.)	Report	20' Sterjovski; 75' Kennedy; 83' Aloisi	Stadium: Donaustadion; Attendance: 5,872; Referee: Wolfgang Stark (Germany)

==== FIFA World Cup qualification ====
3 September 2005 Final round	Australia	7–0	Solomon Islands	Sydney, Australia
	Culina 20'; Viduka 36', 43'; Cahill 57'; Chipperfield 64'; Thompson 68'; Emerton 89'	Report		Stadium: Sydney Football Stadium; Attendance: 16,000; Referee: Subkhiddin Mohd Salleh (Malaysia)

6 September 2005 Final round	Solomon Islands	1–2	Australia	Honiara, Solomon Islands
	Fa'arodo 49'	Report	19' Thompson; 58' Emerton	Stadium: Lawson Tama Stadium; Attendance: 16,000; Referee: Shamsul Maidin (Singapore)

12 November 2005 Play-off	Uruguay	1–0	Australia	Montevideo, Uruguay
	Rodríguez 37'	Report		Stadium: Estadio Centenario; Attendance: 55,000; Referee: Claus Bo Larsen (Denmark)

16 November 2005 Play-off	Australia	1–0 (a.e.t.) (4–2 p)	Uruguay	Sydney, Australia
	Bresciano 35'	Report		Stadium: Telstra Stadium; Attendance: 82,698; Referee: Luis Medina Cantalejo (Spain)
	Penalties
	Kewell (penalty scored); Neill (penalty scored); Vidmar (penalty scored); Viduka (penalty missed); Aloisi (penalty scored)		(penalty missed) Rodríguez; (penalty scored) Varela; (penalty scored) Estoyanoff; (penalty missed) Zalayeta

==== Asian Cup qualification ====
22 February 2006 Group Stage	Bahrain	1–3	Australia	Manama, Bahrain
	Ali 35'	Report	54' Thompson; 79' Skoko; 88' (pen.) Elrich	Stadium: National Stadium; Attendance: 2,500; Referee: Subkhiddin Mohd Salleh (Malaysia)

==== FIFA World Cup ====
12 June 2006 Group Stage	Australia	3–1	Japan	Kaiserslautern, Germany
15:00 CEST	Cahill 84', 89'; Aloisi 90+2'	(Report)	Nakamura 26'	Stadium: Fritz Walter Stadion; Attendance: 46,000; Referee: Essam Abd El Fatah (Egypt)

18 June 2006 Group Stage	Brazil	2–0	Australia	Munich, Germany
18:00 CEST	Adriano 49'; Fred 90'	Report		Stadium: Allianz Arena; Attendance: 66,000; Referee: Markus Merk (Germany)

22 June 2006 Group Stage	Croatia	2–2	Australia	Stuttgart, Germany
21:00 CEST	Srna 2'; N. Kovač 56'	Report	Moore 38' (pen.); Kewell 79'	Stadium: Gottlieb Daimler Stadion; Attendance: 52,000; Referee: Graham Poll (England)

26 June 2006 Round of 16	Italy	1–0	Australia	Kaiserslautern, Germany
17:00 CEST	Totti 90+5' (pen.)	Report		Stadium: Fritz Walter Stadion; Attendance: 46,000; Referee: Luis Medina Cantalejo (Spain)

=== Men's under-23 ===
==== Friendlies ====
The following is a list of friendlies played by the men's under-23 national team in 2005–06.

16 April 2006	Australia	0–0	Iran	Hanoi, Vietnam
		Report

18 April 2006	Vietnam	0–0	Australia	Hanoi, Vietnam
		Report

=== Men's under-20 ===
==== Friendlies ====
The following is a list of friendlies played by the men's under-20 national team in 2005–06.

4 May 2006	Australia	0–1	New Zealand	Canberra, Australia
		Report	Jenkins 60'	Stadium: Australian Institute of Sport

7 May 2006	Australia	1–3	New Zealand	Canberra, Australia
	Berger 67'	Report	Jenkins 29', 81'; White 62'	Stadium: Australian Institute of Sport

10 May 2006	Australia	4–2	New Zealand	Canberra, Australia
	Hearfield 68', 77'; Grossman 80'; Djite 83'	Report	Barbarouses 30'; Roydhouse 89'	Stadium: Australian Institute of Sport

==== AFC Youth Championship qualification ====
22 February 2006	Australia	3–0	Turkmenistan	Colombo, Sri Lanka
	Hearfield 1', 70'; Williams 65'	Report		Stadium: Sugathadasa Stadium

26 February 2006	Sri Lanka	0–4	Australia	Colombo, Sri Lanka
		Report	Hearfield 47'; Grossman 70'; Djite 80', 82'	Stadium: Sugathadasa Stadium

=== Men's under-17 ===
==== Friendlies ====
The following is a list of friendlies played by the men's under-17 national team in 2005–06.

24 July 2005 Four Nation Tournament	Ecuador	0–0	Australia	Lima, Peru
		Report

26 July 2005 Four Nation Tournament	Peru	2–2	Australia	Lima, Peru
	Campos 39'; Carnero 45+1'	Report	Cumming 42'; Spiranovic 74'	Referee: Víctor Hugo Carrillo (Peru)

28 July 2005 Four Nation Tournament	Peru	1–1	Australia	Lima, Peru
	Espejo 4'	Report	Miller 45'

==== FIFA U-17 World Championship ====
16 September 2005 Group stage	Turkey	1–0	Australia	Lima, Peru
17:00 PET	Şahin 84'	Report		Stadium: Estadio Nacional; Attendance: 14,200; Referee: Kevin Stott (United States)

19 September 2005 Group stage	Mexico	3–0	Australia	Lima, Peru
15:30 PET	Esparza 20'; Vela 43', 79'	Report		Stadium: Estadio Nacional; Attendance: 6,000; Referee: Horacio Elizondo (Argentina)

22 September 2005 Group stage	Australia	2–1	Uruguay	Chiclayo, Peru
15:30 PET	Burns 20'; Kruse 83'	Report	Figueroa 38'	Stadium: Estadio Elías Aguirre; Attendance: 11,100; Referee: Jerome Damon (South Africa)

==== 2006 AFC U-17 Championship qualification ====
7 February 2006 Group stage	Laos	0–0	Australia	Vientiane, Laos
		Report		Stadium: Laos National Stadium; Attendance: 5,000

9 February 2006 Group stage	Australia	3–1	Indonesia	Vientiane, Laos
	Visconte 39'; Giannou 60'; Brown 68'	Report	69'	Stadium: Laos National Stadium; Attendance: 2,500

=== Women's senior ===
==== Friendlies ====
The following is a list of friendlies played by the women's senior national team in 2005–06.

16 July 2005	China	1–2	Australia	Tianjin, China
	Ji Ting 60'	Report	Gill 27'; Peters 90'	Stadium: Minyuan Stadium; Attendance: 4,500

19 July 2005	China	2–0	Australia	Tianjin, China
	Zhang Ying 45'; Han Duan 56'	Report		Stadium: Minyuan Stadium; Attendance: 7,000

23 July 2005	Japan	4–2	Australia	Tokyo, Japan
	Nagasato 27', 44'; Ohno 43'; Tomoe Sakai 67'	Report	De Vanna 14'; Peters 23' (pen.)	Attendance: 4,191

26 July 2005	South Korea	0–0	Australia	Jeonju, South Korea
		Report

28 July 2005	South Korea	3–0	Australia	Jeonju, South Korea
	unknown 56' unknown 58' unknown 67'	Report

16 October 2005	United States	0–0	Australia	Fullerton, United States
		Report		Stadium: Titan Stadium; Attendance: 5,394; Referee: Kari Seitz (United States); Jennifer Bennett (United States)

19 October 2005	Mexico	0–2	Australia	El Paso, United States
		Report	Walsh 86'; Shipard 90'	Stadium: Patriot Stadium; Referee: Jennifer Bennett (United States)

25 November 2005	Australia	0–0	China	Gosford, Australia
		Report		Stadium: Central Coast Stadium; Attendance: 1,900; Referee: Krystyna Szokolai

3 December 2005	Australia	0–0	China	Sydney, Australia
		Report		Stadium: Sydney Football Stadium; Referee: Tammy Ogston

25 May 2006	Australia	2–1	Mexico	Melbourne, Australia
	Gill 75'; Salisbury 84'	Report	Ocampo 13'	Stadium: MCG; Referee: Tammy Ogston

28 May 2006	Australia	3–0	Mexico	Melbourne, Australia
	Burgess 58'; Peters 33'; De Vanna 90'	Report		Stadium: Lakeside Stadium

30 May 2006	Australia	4–0	Mexico	Melbourne, Australia
	Munoz 44', 45', 75'; Walsh 60'	Report		Stadium: SS Anderson Reserve

16 June 2006	China	2–1	Australia	Shanghai, China
	unknown 28' (o.g.); Pu Wei 75' (pen.)	Report	Walsh 48'	Stadium: Shanghai FA Training Centre

19 June 2006	China	2–0	Australia	Shanghai, China
	unknown 38' unknown 44'	Report		Stadium: Oriental Green Boat Holiday Village

=== Women's under-20 ===
==== Friendlies ====
The following is a list of friendlies played by the women's senior national team in 2005–06.

15 February 2006	Australia	3–1	New Zealand	Canberra, Australia
	Jackson 2', 12'; Khamis 77'	Report	70'	Stadium: Australian Institute of Sport

17 February 2006	Australia	4–0	New Zealand	Canberra, Australia
	Tristram 54'; McDonnell 65'; McCallum 78'; Khamis 81'	Report		Stadium: Australian Institute of Sport

==== AFC U-19 Women's Championship qualification ====
5 March 2006	Thailand	2–6	Australia	Bangkok, Thailand
	Chawong 20'; Maijarern 73'	Report	Carroll 14'; Tristram 40'; McDonnell 45+4', 90+1'; Cooper 80'; Khamis 90+4'	Stadium: Supachalasai Stadium

7 March 2006	Australia	6–0	Myanmar	Bangkok, Thailand
	Ledbrook 14', 78', 85'; McDonnell 34'; Uzunlar 70', 88'	Report		Stadium: Supachalasai Stadium

==== AFC U-19 Women's Championship ====
9 April 2006 Group stage	China	0–1	Australia	Kuala Lumpur, Malaysia
		Report	McDonnell 54'	Stadium: KLFA Stadium

11 April 2006 Group stage	Australia	16–0	Malaysia	Kuala Lumpur, Malaysia
	McCallum 10', 27'; Blayney 18'; Tristram 21', 38', 60', 67'; Uzunlar 33', 47'; Balomenos 50', 57', 87'; Ledbrook 53', 57', 75', 82'	Report		Stadium: KLFA Stadium

13 April 2006 Group stage	Australia	7–0	Jordan	Petaling Jaya, Malaysia
19:45 (UTC+08:00)	Cooper 11', 17'; Jackson 32'; Ledbrook 36'; Cartwright 61'; 72' (o.g.)	Report		Stadium: Petaling Jaya Stadium

15 April 2006 Semi-final	Australia	2–4	North Korea	Kuala Lumpur, Malaysia
19:45 (UTC+08:00)	McDonnell 40'; Shipard 81'	Report	Kim Song-hui 6', 15'; Ra Un-sim 52', 90'	Stadium: KLFA Stadium

18 April 2006 Third-place playoff	Japan	2–3	Australia	Petaling Jaya, Malaysia
	Sakaguchi 11'; Nagasato 54'	Report	Khamis 19'; Tristram 75'; McCallum 88'	Stadium: Petaling Jaya Stadium

== Deaths ==
- 25 November 2005: George Best, Northern Ireland and Brisbane Lions midfielder.
