= 2003–04 in Australian soccer =

Soccer in Australia
- Season: 2003–04

Men's soccer
- NSL Premiership: Perth Glory
- NSL Championship: Perth Glory

Women's soccer
- WNSL Premiership: Queensland Sting
- WNSL Championship: NSW Sapphires

The 2003–04 season was the 35th season of national competitive soccer in Australia and 121st overall.

== National teams ==
=== Australia national soccer team ===
==== Friendlies ====
18 February 2004	Venezuela	1–1	Australia	Caracas, Venezuela
	Arango 90+2'	Report	Agostino 18'	Stadium: Estadio Olímpico; Attendance: 12,000; Referee: Óscar Ruiz (Colombia)

30 March 2004	Australia	1–0	South Africa	London, England
	Bresciano 19'	Report		Stadium: Loftus Road; Attendance: 16,108; Referee: Mark Halsey (England)

=== Australia women's national soccer team ===
==== 2003 FIFA Women's World Cup ====
Pos	Team	Pld	W	D	L	GF	GA	GD	Pts	Qualification
1	China	3	2	1	0	3	1	+2	7	Advance to knockout stage
2	Russia	3	2	0	1	5	2	+3	6	Advance to knockout stage
3	Ghana	3	1	0	2	2	5	−3	3	
4	Australia	3	0	1	2	3	5	−2	1	

Source: FIFA
Rules for classification: Group stage tiebreakers

21 September Group D	Australia	1–2	Russia	Carson, United States
17:30 UTC−7	Golebiowski		Alagich 39' (o.g.); Fomina 89'	Stadium: Home Depot Center; Attendance: 15,239; Referee: Bola Elizabeth Abidoye (Nigeria)

25 September Group D	China	1–1	Australia	Carson, United States
19:00 UTC−7	Bai Jie 46'		Garriock 28'	Stadium: Home Depot Center; Attendance: 13,929; Referee: Katriina Elovirta (Finland)

28 September Group D	Ghana	2–1	Australia	Portland, United States
17:15 UTC−7	A. Sackey 34', 39'		Garriock 61'	Stadium: Providence Park; Attendance: 19,132; Referee: Katriina Elovirta (Finland)

==== 2004 Australia Cup ====
18 February 2004	Australia	2–0	New Zealand	Brisbane, Australia
	Mann 26'; Walsh 30'	Report		Stadium: QEII Stadium; Attendance: Referee: Jacqui Melksham (Australia)

24 February 2004	Australia	0–0	China	Brisbane, Australia
		Report		Stadium: QEII Stadium

==== 2004 OFC Women's Olympic qualifying tournament ====
4 March 2004	Australia	10–0	Papua New Guinea	Ba, Fiji
15:30 UTC+12	Gill 5', 16', 36'; De Vanna 23', 33'; Walsh 30'; Peters 38'; Selin Kuralay 52'; Mann 65', 77'	Report		Stadium: Govind Park; Attendance: 300; Referee: Bentla D'Coth (India)

6 March 2004	Fiji	0–7	Australia	Ba, Fiji
15:30 UTC+12	Harch 3', 5', 49'; Mann 18', 59'; Foster 33'; Gill 90'	Report		Stadium: Govind Park; Attendance: 600; Referee: Dongqing Zhang (China)

== Men's football ==
=== National Soccer League ===
Pos	Team	Pld	W	D	L	GF	GA	GD	Pts	Qualification
1	Perth Glory (C)	24	18	3	3	56	22	+34	57	Qualification to Finals series
2	Parramatta Power	24	16	3	5	58	30	+28	51	Qualification to Finals series
3	Adelaide United	24	11	7	6	28	25	+3	40	Qualification to Finals series
4	Marconi Stallions	24	10	8	6	29	25	+4	38	Qualification to Finals series
5	South Melbourne	24	11	4	9	39	21	+18	37	Qualification to Finals series
6	Brisbane Strikers	24	9	5	10	28	33	−5	32	Qualification to Finals series
7	Northern Spirit	24	9	3	12	31	33	−2	30	
8	Sydney Olympic	24	7	8	9	26	31	−5	29	
9	Wollongong Wolves	24	8	5	11	34	41	−7	29	
10	Sydney United	24	7	8	9	18	25	−7	29	
11	Newcastle United	24	6	6	12	18	33	−15	24	
12	Melbourne Knights	24	6	5	13	21	41	−20	23	
13	Football Kingz	24	4	3	17	25	51	−26	15	

Source: ozfootball.net
Rules for classification: 1) Points; 2) Goal difference; 3) Goals scored;
(C) Champions

== Women's football ==
=== National Soccer League ===
Pos	Team	Pld	W	D	L	GF	GA	GD	Pts	Qualification or relegation
1	Queensland Sting	10	8	2	0	37	9	+28	26	Qualification for the Grand Final
2	NSW Sapphires (C)	10	6	4	0	32	10	+22	22	Qualification for the Grand Final
3	SASI Pirates	10	4	1	5	19	25	−6	13	
4	Canberra Eclipse	10	2	4	4	9	12	−3	10	
5	Victoria Vision	10	2	3	5	14	32	−18	9	
6	Northern NSW Pride	10	0	2	8	15	38	−23	2	

Source: ozfootball.net
Rules for classification: 1) Points; 2) Goal difference; 3) Goals scored
(C) Champions
