= Melissa Barbieri =

Australian soccer player (born 1980)

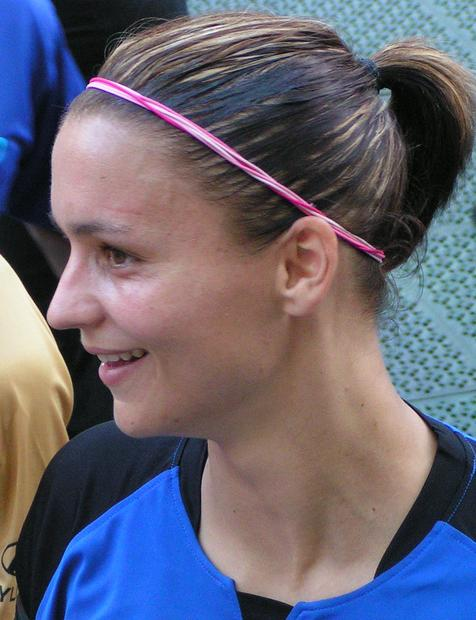
- Barbieri in 2008

Personal information
- Full name: Melissa Anne Barbieri
- Date of birth: 20 January 1980 (age 46)
- Place of birth: Melbourne, Australia
- Height: 1.68 m (5 ft 6 in)
- Positions: Goalkeeper; midfielder

Team information
- Current team: Melbourne City (player, assistant manager)
- Number: 23

Youth career
- 1994: South Melbourne
- 1995: Doncaster
- 1996–1997: Brunswick
- 1998: Ringwood

Senior career*
Years	Team	Apps	(Gls)
1996–1998	ITC Victoria	12	(1)
1999–2008	Victoria Vision	55	(0)
2008	Richmond SC (men)		
2008–2011	Melbourne Victory	28	(0)
2011–2012	Newcastle Jets	9	(0)
2012–2013	Box Hill United	10	(0)
2013–2015	Adelaide United	24	(0)
2015–2016	Melbourne Victory	11	(0)
2016	Taroona	1	(0)
2016–2018	Heidelberg United	20	(3)
2017–	Melbourne City	39	(0)
2019	Alamein	21	(0)
2023	Southern United	1	(0)
2024	Bentleigh Greens	12	(0)

International career^{‡}
2002–2015	Australia	86	(0)

Managerial career
- 2016–2017: Heidelberg United (women)
- 2018–present: Melbourne City
- * Club domestic league appearances and goals as of 6 February 2026 ‡ National team caps and goals as of 18 June 2015

Melissa Hudson (née Melissa Anne Barbieri; Italian: [meˈlis.sa barˈbjɛ.ri] mə-LEE-sə bar-BYEH-ree; born 20 January 1980) is an Australian soccer goalkeeper who has played for Melbourne City in the A-League Women. From 2002 she represented the Australia women's national soccer team (Matildas) and was captain from 2010 to 2013. She competed at four FIFA Women's World Cup tournaments (2003, 2007, 2011, 2015).

After 86 caps, Barbieri retired from international football in June 2015 and set the record for the most clean sheets by any Matildas keeper, at 34. As at February 2026 she was still playing for Melbourne City and had become the longest-serving professional soccer player in Australian history with 28 years in league teams.

Barbieri was named A-League Women's Goalkeeper of the Year (Golden Glove) for the 2008–09 and 2013–14 seasons.

== Early years ==
Barbieri was born in Melbourne on 20 January 1980 to Italian-born parents, her mother is Nory Barbieri. From eight years old she regularly played in boys' teams, where her brothers had played. The goalie later recalled, "I would always go to their trainings and be a nuisance for all the coaches" until they let her play. Upon turning ten she was excluded from playing in boys teams, so she gave up soccer. Barbieri resumed playing as a 14 year-old when her mother found a women's team for her. She achieved a scholarship with the Victorian Institute of Sport (VIS).

== Playing career ==
=== Club and state career ===
Barbieri began playing youth soccer as a midfielder in 1994 for Victorian Premier League teams: South Melbourne (1994), Doncaster, Brunswick (1996–97), Moorabbin, Ringwood (2000) and Box Hill (2001). She also played as a senior for VIS-sponsored ITC Victoria (Victoria Intensive Training Centre, later known as Victoria Vision) during the 1996–97 and 1997–98 seasons in the Women’s National Soccer League. Her first senior game was on 21 February 1997 for ITC Victoria in a 0–2 loss against SA Sports Institute. Barbieri scored her first goal for ITC Victoria in February 1998 in their 4–1 win against the same team. In 1999 she had a hamstring tendinitis injury, which restricted playing in the outfield, she switched to goalkeeping. Her coach at VIS, until 2003, was Jane Oakley. Her state appearances include Victorian State Junior Team 1994-96, Victorian State Youth Team 1994-99 and Victorian State Senior Team 1998.

She played for Richmond SC mens side during 2008, becoming the first female to play in the Australian semi-professional men's league. Also in that year, she was approached by the United States football team, Boston Renegades. However, the Boston management eventually pursued this no further for the remainder of the season, due to Barbieri's commitments to the Australian national team.

Barbieri signed for Melbourne Victory for the inaugural season of the W-League (later A-League Women) in 2008–09. She won the Goalkeeper of the Year award (Golden Glove) in that season. After the 2010–11 season she transferred to Newcastle Jets for 2011–12. Thereafter she was loaned to Adelaide United for 2013–14. While at Adelaide, she won a second Golden Glove award.

In July 2016, Barbieri signed a deal to play one game as a guest for Taroona in the Tasmanian Women's Super League. In that year Barbieri announced her retirement from soccer after an anterior cruciate ligament injury (ACL), while playing for National Premier Leagues Victoria Women team, Heidelberg United. In November 2017, Barbieri (as Melissa Hudson) came out of retirement to join Melbourne City on an injury replacement contract, after one of their goalkeepers, Emily Shields broke her wrist. As of June 2025, Barbieri has played 110 A-League Women's games including her ninth season for Melbourne City in 2024–25. At 45 (in September 2025) she was the oldest Australian professional league's soccer player (male or female) ever, with 28 years in various teams.

=== International career ===
Barbieri was selected for the Australian Schoolgirls Team in 1996. She was named for the Australia women's national soccer team (Matildas) training squad in 1997 as a midfielder, but made her debut in goals for them in September 2002 for a friendly away game against Canada, which Australia won 0-1 in Victoria, British Columbia. In October they competed in the US Cup, where Matildas finished second behind the hosts and Barbieri kept clean sheets in their victories against Russia and Italy.

In January–February 2003 Barbieri joined the Matildas' squad as reserve goalie behind Claire Nichols for the fifth Australia Cup, held in Canberra. However, she remained on the substition bench for all three games. As a member of Oceania Football Confederation (OFC), the Matildas competed at the 2003 OFC Women's Championship, also in Canberra, in April. The team won all four of their games, without concding a goal and hence won the championship. The tournament was the Oceania qualifier for that year's FIFA Women's World Cup. At World Cup, with two losses and a draw, the Matildas finished at the bottom of Group D. In the following year they won the 2004 OFC Women's Olympic Qualifying Tournament, a round-robin held in Fiji in March. At the 2004 Summer Olympics in Athens in August, the Matildas reached the quarter-finals for the first time, but lost against Sweden.

Australia left the OFC for the Asian Football Confederation (AFC) in 2006. Barbieri played in the 2006 AFC Women's Asian Cup, which was held in Australia. The Matildas reached the final against China, which the visitors won after a penalty shoot-out. By finishing second Australia qualified for the 2007 World Cup. At the latter tournament in China, the Matildas reached the quarter-finals, where they lost against Brazil 3–2. On 19 February 2010, Barbieri was named captain of the Matildas following the 2009 retirement of Cheryl Salisbury. She led them to victory at the 2010 AFC Women's Asian Cup, held in China. In the final against North Korea Australia scored first, but the opposition equalised and, with a 1–1 draw after extra time, the game went to a penalty shoot-out, which the Matildas won 4–5.

Barbieri captained Australia for the 2011 FIFA Women's World Cup, held in Germany in June–July, the Matildas reached the quarter-finals where they lost against Sweden (3–1). In September of that year the Australians competed in the final round of AFC qualifiers for 2012 Summer Olympics, which were held in China. Two losses (against Japan and North Korea) resulted in their elimination from the Olympic qualifiers. Ahead of having her first child, Barbieri was dropped from the Matildas, and was eventually replaced as captain by Kate Gill and Clare Polkinghorne, in May 2013.

In May 2015, national coach Alen Stajcic controversially cut number one goalkeeper, Brianna Davey from Australia's 2015 FIFA Women's World Cup squad and recalled Barbieri for her fourth World Cup. At that tournament, held in Canada in June–July, Barbieeri was in goals for the first game, which Australia lost against United States. Thereafter she was replaced by Lydia Williams and the Matildas reached the quarter-finals for the first time at a World Cup. After that tournament Barbieri retired from international soccer, with 86 caps and setting the record at 34 for most clean sheets of any Matilda goalkeeper. Barbieri explained her decision, "I'm very proud of what I've achieved over the years. I came into the sport as a child being told women don't play football and grew up in an Italian household where women predominantly stayed at home and looked after the kids and certainly didn't venture out into a male dominated sport, so I feel like I've broken down a lot of barriers becoming a footballer."

== Coaching career ==
Barbieri was appointed coach of Heidelberg United's women's team in October 2016. In July 2018, Barbieri (as Hudson) was appointed as an assistant coach of A-League Women team, Melbourne City.

== In popular culture ==
Barbieri is popularly referred to as Bubs. She was on the cover of the Australian FourFourTwo magazine in June 2011, along with fellow Matildas Thea Slatyer, Sam Kerr, Kyah Simon and Sarah Walsh. On 30 May 2025 Australian Broadcasting Corporation (ABC) posted a documentary, History Makers: The Story of the 2010 AFC Women's Asian Cup, on Football Australia's official YouTube channel. It features Barbieri and teammates with coach Sermanni from their Asian Cup victory 15 years earlier.

== Personal life ==
Barbieri married Geoff Hudson in 2007 and the couple's child was born in 2013. Upon announcing her pregnancy in late 2012, she was dropped from the Matildas' line-up and lost her funding. Due to lack of maternity support and also being dropped by Melbourne Victory, she had to give up league soccer for a year. Her transfer to Adelaide required Barbieri to sell off personal memorabilia to maintain her playing career.

She completed a Diploma of Recreation (Sports Admin) and worked for VIS in Sports Administration in 2004. During 2012 Barbieri was completing a Coaching A Licence.

== Honours ==
=== Country ===
Australia

- OFC Women's Nations Cup: 2003
- AFC Women's Asian Cup: 2010
- AFF Women's Championship: 2008

=== Individual ===
- W-League Goalkeeper of the Year: 2008–09, 2013–14
- Football Federation of Victoria Hall of Fame: 2015.
- Professional Footballers Australia (PFA) Alex Tobin OAM Medal: 2023
- Professional Footballers Australia (PFA) A-League Women Team of the Year: 2021–22

Sporting positions
Preceded by Cheryl Salisbury	Australia captain 2009–2013	Succeeded by Clare Polkinghorne
