= Australia Cup (1999–2004) =

International association football women's cup tournament in Australia

The Australia Cup was a women's international soccer tournament hosted annually in Australia between 1999 and 2004.

== 1999 ==
1999 Australia Cup
Tournament details
- Host country: Australia
- Dates: 6 – 13 January
- Teams: 3
- Venue: 2 (in 2 host cities)

Final positions
- Champions: Australia (1st title)
- Runners-up: Italy
- Third place: Canada

Tournament statistics
- Matches played: 5
- Goals scored: 12 (2.4 per match)
- Top scorer: (Canada) Charmaine Hooper (3 goals)

=== Results ===
==== Pool stage ====
Pos	Team	Pld	W	WD	LD	L	PF	PA	PD	Pts	Qualification
1	Italy	2	1	1	0	0	2	1	+1	5	Final
2	Australia (H)	3	1	0	1	1	5	4	+1	4	Final
3	Canada	2	0	0	0	2	3	5	−2	0	

Source: Australia Cup
Rules for classification: 1) points; 2) goal difference; 3) goals scored; 4) head-to-head result.
(H) Host
6 January 1999

Italy	1–0	Canada
Panico

Marconi Stadium, Sydney
9 January 1999

Australia	1–1	Italy
Salisbury 85'		Panico 60'
Penalties
	3–4

Marconi Stadium, Sydney
10 January 1999

Australia	4–3	Canada
Murray 54'; Iannotta 17'; Casagrande 61'; Tann-Darby 89'		Donnelly 30'; Hooper 60', 69'

Bruce Stadium, Canberra

==== Classification matches ====
===== Third-place match =====
13 January 1999

Canada	1–0	Australia B
Hooper 89'

Bruce Stadium, Canberra

===== Final =====
13 January 1999

Italy	0–1	Australia
		Salisbury 19'

Bruce Stadium, Canberra

== 2000 ==
2000 Australia Cup
Tournament details
- Host country: Australia
- Dates: 7 – 13 January
- Teams: 4
- Venue: 4 (in 3 host cities)

Final positions
- Champions: United States (1st title)
- Runners-up: Sweden
- Third place: Australia

Tournament statistics
- Matches played: 6
- Goals scored: 20 (3.33 per match)
- Top scorer: (United States) Sherill Kester (3 goals)

=== Results ===
Pos	Team	Pld	W	D	L	GF	GA	GD	Pts
1	United States	3	2	1	0	11	2	+9	7
2	Sweden	3	2	1	0	4	0	+4	7
3	Australia (H)	3	1	0	2	4	5	−1	3
4	Czech Republic	3	0	0	3	1	13	−12	0

Source: Australia Cup
Rules for classification: 1) points; 2) goal difference; 3) goals scored; 4) head-to-head result.
(H) Hosts

==== Pool ====
7 January 2000

United States	8–1	Czech Republic
Mascaro 12', 65'; Bush 16'; Serlenga 40'; Kester 50', 57'; Welsh 75'; Zepeda 83'		Dudová 86'

Olympic Park, Melbourne
7 January 2000

Australia	0–2	Sweden
		Andersson 15'; Ljungberg 26'

North Sydney Oval, Sydney

10 January 2000

United States	0–0	Sweden

Lakeside Stadium, Melbourne
10 January 2000

Australia	3–0	Czech Republic
Tann-Darby 59'; Murray 60'; Black 86'

Lakeside Stadium, Melbourne

13 January 2000

Australia	1–3	United States
Forman 74'		Kester 13'; Slaton 34'; Wagner 81'

Hindmarsh Stadium, Adelaide
13 January 2000

Sweden	2–0	Czech Republic
Andersson 35'; Ljungberg 77'

Hindmarsh Stadium, Adelaide

== 2001 ==
Team	Pld	W	D	L	GF	GA	GD	Pts
Australia	3	2	1	0	4	2	+2	7
France	3	0	1	2	2	4	−2	1

11 January 2001

Australia	2–1	France
Revell 47'; Salisbury 49'		Lattaf 66'

Coffs Harbour
14 January 2001

Australia	1–1	France
Revell 80'		Mugneret-Béghée 88'

Lismore
17 January 2001

Australia	1–0	France
Mann 55'

Gold Coast

== 2002 ==
Team	Pld	W	D	L	GF	GA	GD	Pts
Australia	3	3	0	0	6	1	+5	9
South Korea	3	0	0	3	1	6	−5	0

13 January 2002

Australia	1–0	South Korea
Mann 72'

Robertson Oval, Wagga Wagga
16 January 2002

Australia	1–0	South Korea
Peters 32'

Lavington Sports Ground, Albury
19 January 2002

Australia	4–1	South Korea
Mann 29'; Golebiowski 66'; Black 75'; Garriock 79'		Suk Jung Jung 41'

Tom Flood Sports Oval, Bendigo

== 2003 ==
Team	Pld	W	D	L	GF	GA	GD	Pts
Sweden	3	2	1	0	12	2	+10	7
Australia	3	2	0	1	5	3	+2	6
Mexico	3	1	1	1	3	3	0	4
South Korea	3	0	0	3	0	12	−12	0

26 January 2003

Australia	2–0	South Korea
Golebiowski 10', 76'	abd. Report

McKellar Park, Canberra
Referee: Tammy Ogston
- match abandoned after 77' (with result standing) following an incident between a Korean official and an assistant referee
26 January 2003

Mexico	1–1	Sweden
Pérez 13'		Svensson 92'

McKellar Park, Canberra
29 January 2003

Sweden	8–0	South Korea
Ljungberg 3', 67'; Andersson 29'; Bengtsson 45'; Lundin 53', 77'; Olsson 74'; Fagerström 80'

McKellar Park, Canberra
29 January 2003

Australia	2–0	Mexico
Mann 9', 45'	Report

McKellar Park, Canberra
Referee: Tammy Ogston
1 February 2003

South Korea	0–2	Mexico
		Gómez 9'; Domínguez 29'

McKellar Park, Canberra
1 February 2003

Australia	1–3	Sweden
Golebiowski 38'	Report	Olsson 40'; Tornqvist 49'; Bengtsson 73'

McKellar Park, Canberra
Referee: Tammy Ogston

== 2004 ==
Team	Pld	W	D	L	GF	GA	GD	Pts
North Korea	3	2	1	0	14	0	+14	7
Australia	3	1	2	0	2	0	+2	5
China	3	1	1	1	3	3	0	4
New Zealand	3	0	0	3	0	16	−16	0

18 February 2004

North Korea	3–0	China
unknown 44' (o.g.); Jin Pyol-hui 53'; Yun Yong Hui 56'

QE II Stadium, Brisbane
18 February 2004

Australia	2–0	New Zealand
Mann 26'; Walsh 30'

QE II Stadium, Brisbane
22 February 2004

Australia	0–0	North Korea
	Abandoned (Note: match abandoned at half time due to adverse weather, with a declaration of a 0–0 result (although North Korea were leading 0–1.)

QE II Stadium, Brisbane
22 February 2004

China	3–0	New Zealand
Wang 10', 38'; Xu 21'

QE II Stadium, Brisbane
24 February 2004

North Korea	11–0	New Zealand
Ri Kum-suk 15'; Yun Yong Hui 22'; Ri Hyang Ok 34'; O Kum Ran 47'; Jin Pyol-hui 52', 62', 78' unknown 59' (o.g.); Jong Pok Sim 67', 71'; Ri Un Gyong 75'

QE II Stadium, Brisbane
24 February 2004

Australia	0–0	China

QE II Stadium, Brisbane
