= Collette McCallum =

Australian footballer

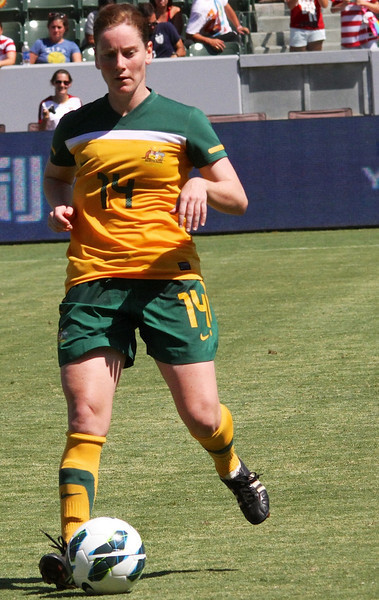
- McCallum playing for the Matildas in 2012

Personal information
- Full name: Collette Gardiner
- Birth name: Collette McCallum
- Date of birth: 26 March 1986 (age 40)
- Place of birth: Rutherglen, Scotland
- Height: 5 ft 5 in (1.65 m)
- Position: Midfielder

Youth career
- NSW Institute of Sport
- Australian Institute of Sport
- WA Institute of Sport

Senior career*
| Years | Team | Apps | (Gls) |
- Manly Warringah
- NSW Academy of Sport
- Western Waves FC
| 2008 | Pali Blues | 8 | (5) |
| 2008–2009 | Perth Glory | 10 | (2) |
| 2009 | Sky Blue FC | 23 | (0) |
| 2009–2011 | Perth Glory | 14 | (3) |
| 2012 | Lincoln Ladies | 8 | (1) |
| 2012–2015 | Perth Glory | 16 | (4) |

International career^{‡}
| 2002–2006 | Australia U-20 | 19 | (13) |
| 2005–2015 | Australia | 81 | (11) |

Managerial career
- 2015–: Perth Glory (Assistant)
- * Club domestic league appearances and goals as of 7 July 2015 ‡ National team caps and goals as of 7 July 2015

Collette Gardiner (née McCallum; born 26 March 1986) is an Australian retired footballer who played as a midfielder, earning over 80 caps for the Australian national team. She last played for Perth Glory in the Australian W-League.

== Playing career ==
Born in Scotland, McCallum emigrated to Australia with her family at the age of four. She played for Pali Blues in the American USL W-League in 2008. Following her debut game for the Blues, she was selected for the W-League team of the week as a result of scoring two goals against Ventura County Fusion. Pali Blues went on to win the W-League championship in that season.

In 2009, McCallum played for Sky Blue FC in the new Women's Professional Soccer in the United States. The club went on to win the 2009 Women's Professional Soccer Playoffs in their debut year & in doing so McCallum became the first Australian woman to win a club title overseas.

=== International ===
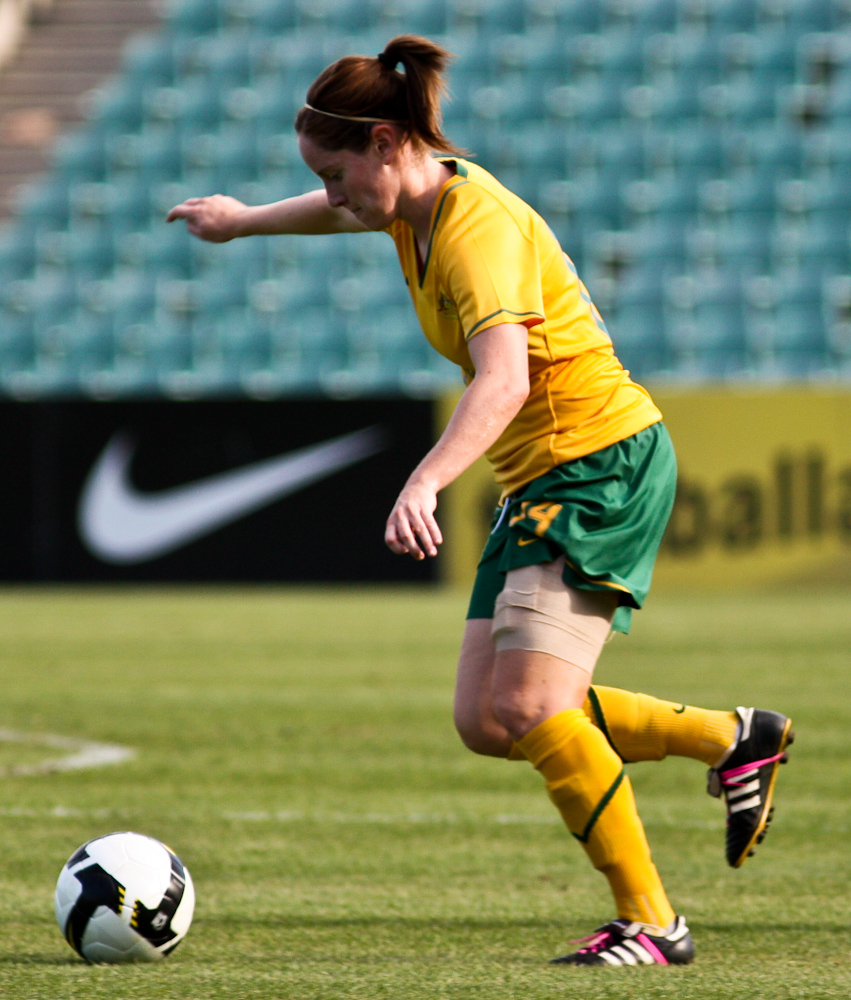
McCallum in action for the Matildas.

McCallum amassed 81 caps for the Matildas. Following the retirements of Cheryl Salisbury and Joanne Peters in February 2010, she was named the Matildas vice captain.

As a youth representative McCallum represented the Young Matildas on 19 occasions, & was named in the FIFA All-Star Team at the 2006 FIFA U-20 Women's World Championship.

McCallum is a player in her age group.

Such is her legacy at youth level that in 2019 Professional Footballers Australia named the Australian Young Player of the Year award the Collette McCallum Medal in her honour.

The 132nd capped Matilda played every Australian fixture at the 2007 FIFA Women’s World Cup (China 2007) & 2011 FIFA Women’s World Cup (Germany 2011) helping the team reach the quarter finals in each tournament.

== Coaching career ==
In 2015, she was employed as the Assistant Coach of the Perth Glory's Women's team, working with Head Coach Bobby Despotovski.

== Career statistics ==
=== International goals ===
Scores and results list Australia's goal tally first.

| # | Date | Venue | Opponent | Score | Result | Competition |
|---|---|---|---|---|---|---|
| 1 | 23 February 2007 | Zhongshan Soccer Stadium, Taipei, Taiwan | Uzbekistan | 8–0 | 10–0 | 2008 Olympics qualifying |
| 2 | 23 February 2007 | Zhongshan Soccer Stadium, Taipei, Taiwan | Uzbekistan | 10–0 | 10–0 | 2008 Olympics qualifying |
| 3 | 7 April 2007 | BCU International Stadium, Coffs Harbour, Australia | Hong Kong | 3–0 | 15–0 | 2008 Olympics qualifying |
| 4 | 7 April 2007 | BCU International Stadium, Coffs Harbour, Australia | Hong Kong | 6–0 | 15–0 | 2008 Olympics qualifying |
| 5 | 7 April 2007 | BCU International Stadium, Coffs Harbour, Australia | Hong Kong | 8–0 | 15–0 | 2008 Olympics qualifying |
| 6 | 19 August 2007 | Tianjin Olympic Center Stadium, Tianjin, China | China | 3–0 | 3–1 | Friendly |
| 7 | 20 September 2007 | Chengdu Sports Centre, Chengdu, China | Canada | 1–1 | 2–2 | 2007 FIFA Women's World Cup |
| 8 | 5 March 2008 | Stockland Park, Sunshine Coast, Australia | New Zealand | 1–0 | 4–2 | Friendly |
| 9 | 7 February 2009 | Canberra Stadium, Canberra, Australia | Italy | 1–4 | 1–5 | Friendly |
| 10 | 17 October 2010 | Suwon World Cup Stadium, Suwon, South Korea | Mexico | 1–0 | 3–1 | 2010 Peace Queen Cup |
| 11 | 15 May 2011 | Bluetongue Stadium, Gosford, Australia | New Zealand | 2–1 | 2–1 | Friendly |
| 12 | 23 June 2011 | Borussia-Park, Mönchengladbach, Germany | England | 1–0 | 2–0 | Friendly |
| 13 | 23 June 2011 | Borussia-Park, Mönchengladbach, Germany | England | 2–0 | 2–0 | Friendly |

== Honours ==
=== Club ===
Pali Blues

- USL W-League: 2008

Sky Blue FC

- Women's Professional Soccer: 2009

Perth Glory

- W-League Premiership: 2014

=== Country ===
Australia

- AFC Women's Asian Cup: 2010
- OFC U-20 Women's Championship: 2002

== See also ==
- Women's soccer in Australia
- Foreign players in the FA WSL
