= Danielle Small =

Australian soccer player

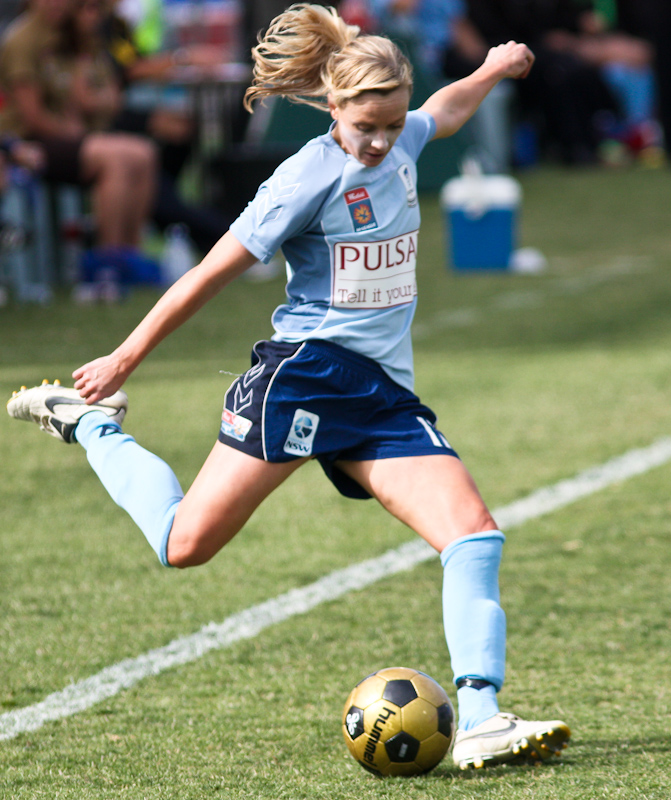
- Small playing for Sydney FC in 2008

Personal information
- Full name: Danielle Margaret Small
- Date of birth: 7 February 1979 (age 47)
- Place of birth: Sydney, Australia
- Height: 1.67 m (5 ft 6 in)
- Position: Midfielder

College career
| Years | Team | Apps | (Gls) |
| 1999–2001 | San Diego State Aztecs | | |

Senior career*
| Years | Team | Apps | (Gls) |
| 2008–2009 | Sydney FC | 10 | (1) |

International career
| 1999–2008 | Australia | 46 | (10) |
- * Club domestic league appearances and goals

Danielle Margaret Small (born 7 February 1979) is a retired Australian soccer player, who played for Sydney FC in the Australian W-League.

Small has represented Australia at the 2003 FIFA Women's World Cup, the 2004 Olympics, and the 2007 FIFA Women's World Cup. She played in the USA Collegiate NCAA Division One Soccer Competition finishing her career at San Diego State University in 2001, studying Exercise Physiology. Previous colleges include University of Mobile, Alabama, and Phillips University in Enid, Oklahoma. Small played two seasons in the U.S. WPSL, representing the Jackson Calypso, Mississippi in 1998, and the Adirondack Lynx, New York in 2006. She completed a degree in Biomedical Science, Forensic Biology at The University of Technology, Sydney in 2010.

Small was married to cricketer Phil Jaques. The couple met in 2000, got engaged in 2004 and were married from 2006 to 2009.

== International goals ==
| No. | Date | Venue | Opponent | Score | Result | Competition |
|---|---|---|---|---|---|---|
| 1. | 23 February 2007 | Zhongshan Soccer Stadium, Taipei, Taiwan | Uzbekistan | 4–0 | 10–0 | 2008 Summer Olympics qualification |
| 2. | 25 February 2007 | Zhongshan Soccer Stadium, Taipei, Taiwan | Chinese Taipei | 7–1 | 8–1 | 2008 Summer Olympics qualification |
| 3. | 7 April 2007 | Coffs Harbour International Stadium, Coffs Harbour, Australia | Hong Kong | 10–0 | 15–0 | 2008 Summer Olympics qualification |
