= 2004 OFC Women's Olympic Qualifying Tournament =

Tournament details
- Host country: Fiji
- City: Ba
- Dates: March 2–6, 2004
- Teams: 3 (from 1 confederation)
- Venue: 1 (in 1 host city)

Final positions
- Champions: Australia (1st title)
- Runners-up: Papua New Guinea
- Third place: Fiji

Tournament statistics
- Matches played: 3
- Goals scored: 19 (6.33 per match)
- Attendance: 1,100 (367 per match)
- Top scorer(s): (Australia) Kate Gill (Australia) April Mann (4 goals each)

The 2004 OFC Women's Olympic Qualifying Tournament was an association football tournament used to determine the Oceanian participant to compete at the 2004 Summer Olympics. It was held at Govind Park in Ba, Fiji, from March 2–6, 2004. It was the first edition of the OFC Women's Olympic Qualifying Tournament (with previous competitions using FIFA Women's World Cup performances for qualification). Three nations participated.

== Tournament ==
Times listed are UTC+12.

Key to colours in group tables
Advanced to Olympic tournament

Team	Pld	W	D	L	GF	GA	GD	Pts
Australia	2	2	0	0	17	0	+17	6
Papua New Guinea	2	1	0	1	2	10	−8	3
Fiji	2	0	0	2	0	9	−9	0

2 March 2004
15:30

Fiji	0–2	Papua New Guinea
	Report	Norrie 22'; Taman 74'

Govind Park, Ba
Attendance: 200
Referee: Hogn Eun-ah ()

4 March 2004
15:30

Australia	10–0	Papua New Guinea
Gill 5', 16', 36'; De Vanna 23', 33'; Walsh 30'; Peters 38'; Selin Kuralay 52'; Mann 65', 77'	Report

Govind Park, Ba
Attendance: 300
Referee: Bentla D'Coth (India)

6 March 2004
15:30

Fiji	0–7	Australia
	Report	Harch 3', 5', 49'; Mann 18', 59'; Foster 33'; Gill 90'

Govind Park, Ba
Attendance: 600
Referee: Dongqing Zhang (China)

== Goalscorers ==
4 goals

- (Australia) Kate Gill
- (Australia) April Mann

3 goals

- (Australia) Lana Harch

2 goals

- (Australia) Lisa De Vanna

1 goal

- (Australia) Gillian Foster
- (Australia) Selin Kuralay
- (Australia) Joanne Peters
- (Australia) Sarah Walsh
- (Papua New Guinea) Tokoe Norrie
- (Papua New Guinea) Nellie Taman

== See also ==
- 2004 OFC Men's Olympic Football Tournament
