= 2002 Women's U.S. Cup =

Tournament details
- Host country: United States
- Dates: September 29 – October 9
- Teams: 4 (from 3 confederations)

The eighth Women's U.S. Cup tournament held in 2002, were joined by four teams: Australia, Italy, Russia and USA. This was the last Women's U.S. Cup.

== Matches ==
September 29 Round-robin	United States	5–1	Russia	Uniondale, New York
4:00pm ET	Chastain 25'; Parlow 31'; Hamm 59', 62'; Wagner 64'		Barbachina 84'	Stadium: Mitchel Athletic Complex; Attendance: 4322

October 2 Round-robin	Italy	1–2	Russia	Cary, North Carolina
5:00pm ET	Guarino 28'		Barbachina 62', 92+'	Stadium: SAS Soccer Park

October 2 Round-robin	United States	4–0	Australia	Cary, North Carolina
7:30pm ET	Chastain 23' (pk); Parlow 34', 58'; MacMillan 74'			Stadium: SAS Soccer Park; Attendance: 2661

October 6 Round-robin	Australia	2–0	Russia	Cary, North Carolina
11:30am ET	Golebiowski 12'; Peters 43'			Stadium: SAS Soccer Park

October 6 Round-robin	United States	4–0	Italy	Cary, North Carolina
2:00pm ET	Lilly 64'; O'Reilly 69'; Fawcett 73'; Chastain 78'			Stadium: SAS Soccer Park; Attendance: 3144

October 9 Round-robin	Australia	0–1	Italy	Cary, North Carolina
7:30pm ET			Camporese 9l+'	Stadium: SAS Soccer Park; Attendance: 364

== Final placing ==
Rank	Team	Matches				Goals		Points
Rank	Team	Played	Win	Draw	Loss	Scored	Against	Points
1	United States	3	3	0	0	13	1	9
2	Australia	3	1	0	2	2	5	3
3	Italy	3	1	0	2	2	6	3
4	Russia	3	1	0	2	3	8	3

== Goal scorers ==
Position	Player	Goals
1	(United States) Brandi Chastain	3
1	(Russia) Natalia Barbachina	3
1	(United States) Cindy Parlow	3
2	(United States) Mia Hamm	2
3	(Italy) Elisa Camporese	1
3	(United States) Joy Fawcett	1
3	(Australia) Kelly Golebiowski	1
3	(Italy) Rita Guarino	1
3	(United States) Kristine Lilly	1
3	(United States) Shannon MacMillan	1
3	(United States) Heather O'Reilly	1
3	(Australia) Joanne Peters	1
3	(United States) Aly Wagner	1
