= Jenna Tristram =

Australian soccer player

Personal information
- Full name: Jenna Joan Tristram
- Date of birth: 28 October 1986 (age 40)
- Place of birth: Coffs Harbour, Australia
- Height: 1.66 m (5 ft 5 in)
- Position: Forward

Senior career*
Years	Team	Apps	(Gls)
2008–2010	Brisbane Roar	5	(0)

International career^{‡}
2007–	Australia	9	(5)
- * Club domestic league appearances and goals as of 10 June 2010 ‡ National team caps and goals as of 3 July 2011

Jenna Joan Tristram (born 28 October 1986) is an Australian soccer player who played for Brisbane Roar in the W-League and for Australia internationally.

== International goals ==
No.	Date	Venue	Opponent	Score	Result	Competition
1.	29 May 2008	Thống Nhất Stadium, Ho Chi Minh City, Vietnam	Chinese Taipei	3–0	4–0	2008 AFC Women's Asian Cup
2.	11 October 2008	Thanh Long Sports Center, Ho Chi Minh City, Vietnam	Philippines	2–0	7–0	2008 AFF Women's Championship
3.	11 October 2008	Thanh Long Sports Center, Ho Chi Minh City, Vietnam	Philippines	5–0	7–0	2008 AFF Women's Championship
4.	13 October 2008	Thanh Long Sports Center, Ho Chi Minh City, Vietnam	Singapore	4–0	6–0	2008 AFF Women's Championship
5.	18 October 2008	Thanh Long Sports Center, Ho Chi Minh City, Vietnam	Myanmar	4–0	5–1	2008 AFF Women's Championship

== Honours ==
=== Club ===
Brisbane Roar:

- W-League Premiership: 2008–09
- W-League Championship: 2008–09

=== International ===
Australia

- AFF Women's Championship: 2008
