= Sarah Walsh =

Australian soccer player

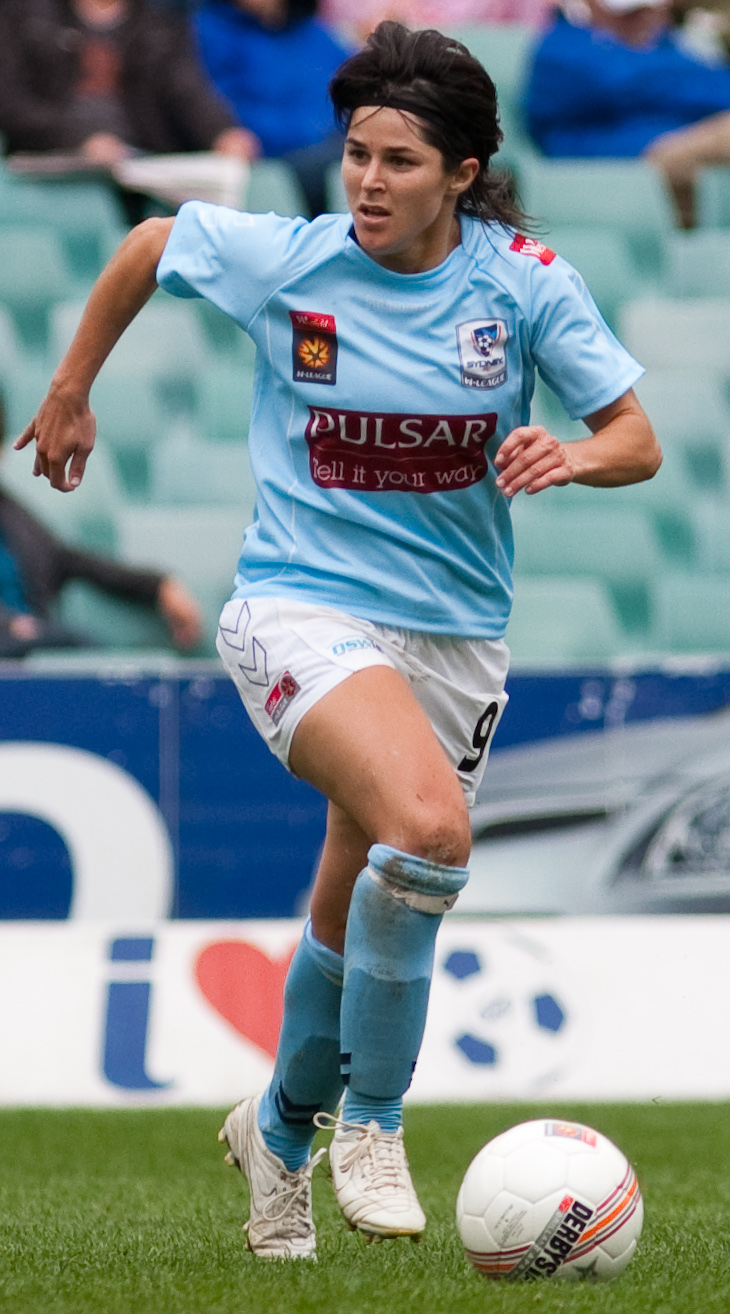
- Walsh playing for Sydney FC in 2009

Personal information
- Full name: Sarah Ann Walsh
- Date of birth: 11 January 1983 (age 43)
- Place of birth: Camden, New South Wales, Australia
- Height: 1.57 m (5 ft 2 in)
- Position: Forward

Youth career
- –2008: NSW Institute of Sport

Senior career*
Years	Team	Apps	(Gls)
2008	Pali Blues	0	(0)
2008–2009	Sydney FC	2	(0)
2009	Sky Blue FC	5	(1)
2009	Saint Louis Athletica	6	(0)
2009–2012	Sydney FC	21	(9)
2010	Boston Breakers		
2012–2013	Western Sydney Wanderers	12	(3)

International career^{‡}
2004–2012	Australia	70	(32)
- * Club domestic league appearances and goals as of 10 October 2013 ‡ National team caps and goals as of 19 September 2012

Sarah Ann Walsh (born 11 January 1983) is an Australian former soccer player who is Head of Women's Football at Football Australia. A forward, she played for the Australia women's national soccer team from 2004 to 2012.

== Early life ==
Walsh was born in Camden, New South Wales.

== Playing career ==
=== Club ===
==== Women's Professional Soccer, 2009 ====
Walsh was selected in the first round of the Women's Professional Soccer league's international draft in 2009 by Sky Blue FC. On 26 June 2009, Walsh was dealt to the Saint Louis Athletica. She had played in 5 games, 4 of them being starts (351 minutes) before being traded. She also added a goal and an assist for Sky Blue FC.

==== Western Sydney Wanderers FC, 2012–13 ====
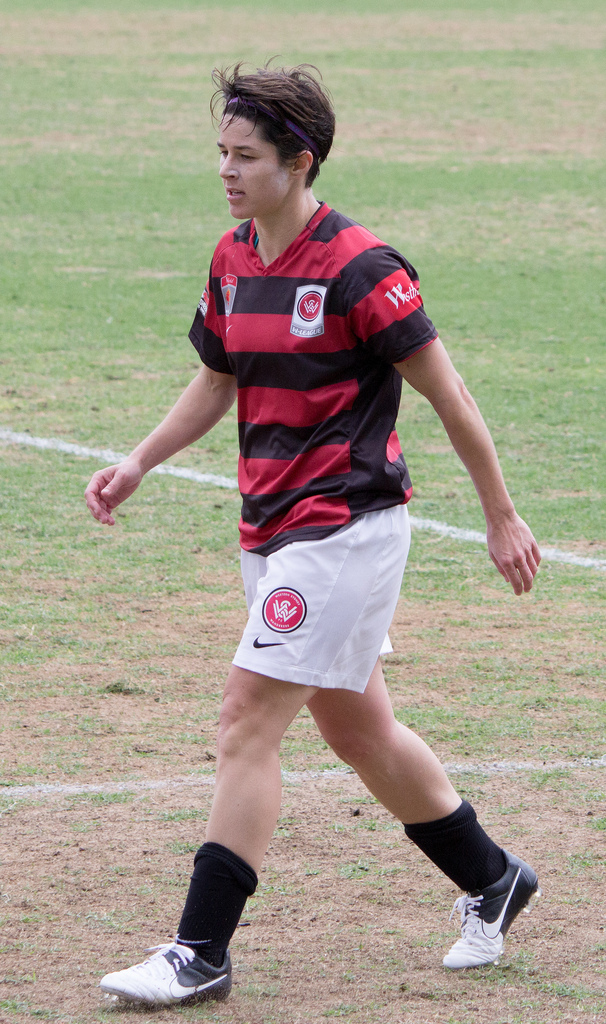
Walsh with the Western Sydney Wanderers, 2012

In October 2012, it was announced that Walsh had signed for Western Sydney Wanderers in the Westfield W-League in Australia for the 2012–13 season. She was promptly elected captain by the team members.

=== International ===
Walsh represented Australia at the 2004 Summer Olympics, 2006 AFC Women's Asian Cup and the 2007 FIFA Women's World Cup.

On 30 August 2012, Walsh announced her international retirement and stated that her last game would be an upcoming friendly match against the United States on 19 September 2012. After scoring a goal in the friendly, Walsh ended her international career when she was substituted out in the 54th minute.

== Sports administration and other roles ==
Walsh is a representative of the Professional Footballers Association's Matildas Delegates' Committee, alongside Melissa Barbieri, Lauren Colthorpe, Heather Garriock and Kate McShea. On 20 January 2010, the Committee and Football Federation Australia announced a new pay deal for the Matildas to take them through to the 2010 AFC Women's Asian Cup football.

As of 2021, she is Football Australia's Head of Women's Football, Women's World Cup Legacy & Inclusion. In November 2021, she was appointed as co-chair of the inaugural National Indigenous Advisory Group of Football Australia. The group aims at supporting and increasing Indigenous participation in the game. In 2024, Walsh was appointed as COO of the Women’s Asian Cup office.

== Personal life ==
Walsh began dating American soccer player Megan Rapinoe in 2009 while they both played for the WPS. After approximately five years together, Rapinoe and Walsh ended their relationship in 2013. She has since married a woman named Toni Knowlson.

== In popular culture ==
In June 2011, Walsh was on the cover of the Australian FourFourTwo magazine, along with fellow Matildas Melissa Barbieri, Sam Kerr, Thea Slatyer and Kyah Simon.

== Career statistics ==
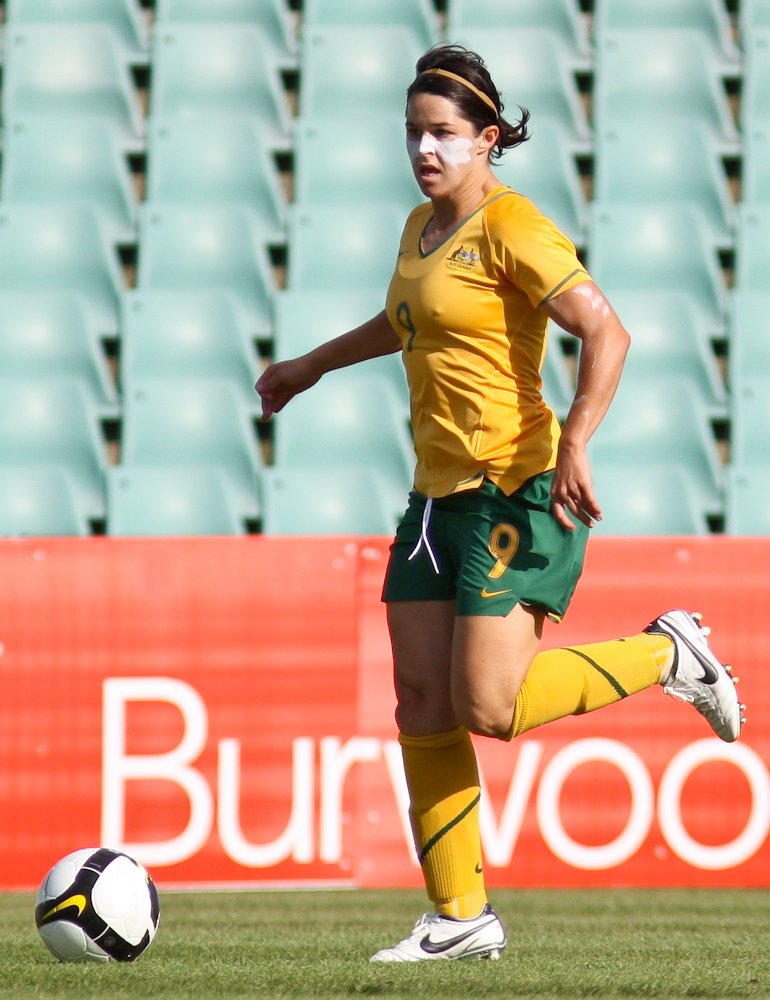
Walsh playing for Australia, 2009

=== International goals ===
Scores and results list Australia's goal tally first.

#	Date	Venue	Opponent	Score	Result	Competition
1	18 February 2004	Queensland Sport and Athletics Centre, Brisbane, Australia	New Zealand	2–0	2–0	2004 Australia Cup
2	4 March 2004	Govind Park, Ba, Fiji	Papua New Guinea	4–0	10–0	2004 Olympic qualifying
3	7 July 2004	Estadio Azteca, Mexico City, Mexico	Mexico	1–0	2–1	Friendly
4	7 July 2004	Estadio Azteca, Mexico City, Mexico	Mexico	2–0	2–1	Friendly
5	19 October 2005	Patriot Stadium, El Paso, United States	Mexico	1–0	2–0	Friendly
6	30 May 2006	Bob Jane Stadium, Melbourne, Australia	Mexico	3–0	4–0	Friendly
7	16 June 2006	Shanghai Football Association National Training Centre, Shanghai, China	China	1–1	1–2	Friendly
8	16 July 2006	Hindmarsh Stadium, Adelaide, Australia	South Korea	2–0	4–0	2006 AFC Women's Asian Cup
9	24 July 2006	Hindmarsh Stadium, Adelaide, Australia	Thailand	3–0	5–0	2006 AFC Women's Asian Cup
10	29 October 2006	Gimhae Stadium, Gimhae, South Korea	Netherlands	1–0	1–0	2006 Peace Queen Cup
11	21 February 2007	Zhongshan Soccer Stadium, Taipei, Taiwan	Myanmar	1–0	2–0	2008 Olympic qualifying
12	21 February 2007	Zhongshan Soccer Stadium, Taipei, Taiwan	Myanmar	2–0	2–0	2008 Olympic qualifying
13	23 February 2007	Zhongshan Soccer Stadium, Taipei, Taiwan	Uzbekistan	5–0	10–0	2008 Olympic qualifying
14	25 February 2007	Zhongshan Soccer Stadium, Taipei, Taiwan	Chinese Taipei	3–0	8–1	2008 Olympic qualifying
15	7 April 2007	BCU International Stadium, Coffs Harbour, Australia	Hong Kong	1–0	15–0	2008 Olympic qualifying
16	7 April 2007	BCU International Stadium, Coffs Harbour, Australia	Hong Kong	2–0	15–0	2008 Olympic qualifying
17	15 April 2007	Zhongshan Soccer Stadium, Taipei, Taiwan	Chinese Taipei	2–0	10–0	2008 Olympic qualifying
18	15 April 2007	Zhongshan Soccer Stadium, Taipei, Taiwan	Chinese Taipei	4–0	10–0	2008 Olympic qualifying
19	15 April 2007	Zhongshan Soccer Stadium, Taipei, Taiwan	Chinese Taipei	6–0	10–0	2008 Olympic qualifying
20	19 July 2007	BCU International Stadium, Coffs Harbour, Australia	New Zealand	1–0	3–0	Friendly
21	19 July 2007	BCU International Stadium, Coffs Harbour, Australia	New Zealand	2–0	3–0	Friendly
22	12 August 2007	BCU International Stadium, Coffs Harbour, Australia	Chinese Taipei	2–0	7–0	2008 Olympic qualifying
23	16 August 2007	Tianjin Olympic Center Stadium, Tianjin, China	China	3–2	3–2	Friendly
24	12 September 2007	Yellow Dragon Sports Center, Hangzhou, China	Ghana	1–0	4–1	2007 FIFA Women's World Cup
25	1 March 2008	Stockland Park, Sunshine Coast, Australia	New Zealand	1–0	2–0	Friendly
26	3 May 2008	Legion Field, Birmingham, United States	United States	2–4	2–5	Friendly
27	17 February 2010	North Harbour Stadium, Auckland, New Zealand	New Zealand	1–0	3–0	Friendly
28	17 February 2010	North Harbour Stadium, Auckland, New Zealand	New Zealand	2–0	3–0	Friendly
29	6 March 2010	Ballymore Stadium, Brisbane, Australia	North Korea	1–0	3–2	Friendly
30	27 June 2012	WIN Stadium, Wollongong, Australia	New Zealand	1–0	2–0	Friendly
31	27 June 2012	WIN Stadium, Wollongong, Australia	New Zealand	2–0	2–0	Friendly
32	19 September 2012	Dick's Sporting Goods Park, Denver, United States	United States	2–1	2–6	Friendly

== Honours ==
=== Club ===
Sydney FC:

- W-League Premiership: 2009
- W-League Championship: 2009

=== International ===
Australia

- AFC Women's Asian Cup: 2010

Sporting positions
Preceded by None	Western Sydney Wanderers captain 2012–2013	Succeeded by Heather Garriock
