= Kim Revell =

Australian footballer

Personal information
- Full name: Kim Aamai Revell
- Date of birth: 16 March 1975 (age 51)
- Place of birth: Lower Hutt, New Zealand
- Height: 1.65 m (5 ft 5 in)
- Position: Midfielder

Senior career*
Years	Team	Apps	(Gls)
- Queensland Sting

International career
1995–2001	Australia	31	(5)
- * Club domestic league appearances and goals

Kim Aamai Revell (born 16 March 1975) is an Australian retired football player. She was a member of the national team between 1995 and 2001. She played club football for the Queensland Sting.
