= Ji Ting =

Chinese footballer

Personal information
- Date of birth: October 11, 1982 (age 44)
- Place of birth: Shanghai, China
- Position: Forward

International career
Years	Team	Apps	(Gls)
2004	China		(1)

Ji Ting (Chinese: 季婷; pinyin: Jì Tíng; born October 11, 1982, in Shanghai) is a Chinese football (soccer) player who played as a forward for the China national team and competed at the 2004 Summer Olympics. In 2004, she finished ninth with the Chinese team at the women's tournament. She played both matches and scored a goal.

== International goals ==
No.	Date	Venue	Opponent	Score	Result	Competition
1.	14 August 2004	Pampeloponnisiako Stadium, Patras, Greece	Mexico	1–1	1–1	2004 Summer Olympics
