= Kate Gill =

Australian soccer player

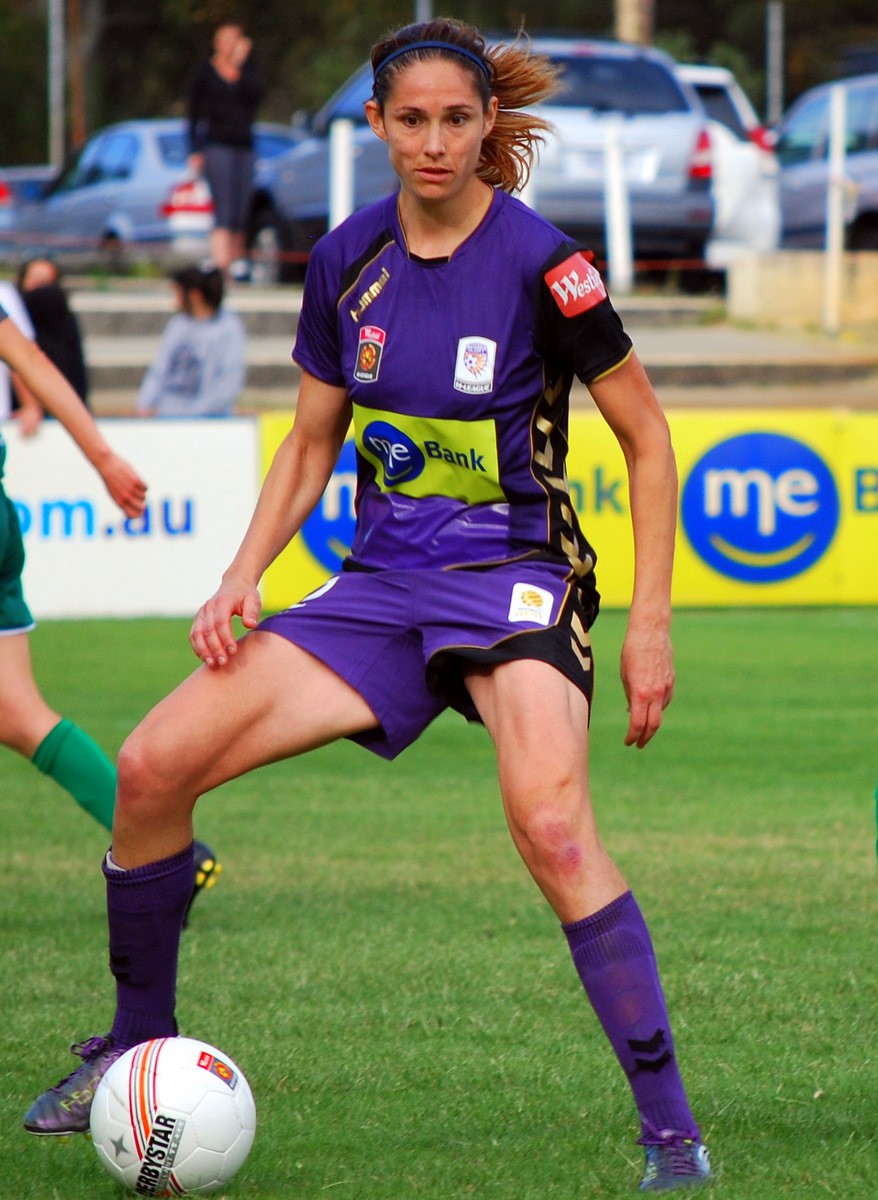
- Gill playing for Perth Glory

Personal information
- Full name: Kathryn Anne Gill
- Date of birth: 10 December 1984 (age 41)
- Place of birth: Auckland, New Zealand
- Height: 1.79 m (5 ft 10 in)
- Position: Centre forward

Senior career*
Years	Team	Apps	(Gls)
1998–2006	Northern NSW Pride		
2007–2008	NSW Sapphires		
2008	AIK Fotboll Dam		
2008–2009	Newcastle Jets	10	(6)
2009	Sunnanå SK	22	(6)
2009	Perth Glory	3	(3)
2010	LdB Malmö	16	(9)
2010–2011	Perth Glory	10	(3)
2011	Linköpings	3	(0)
2012–2015	Perth Glory	34	(30)

International career^{‡}
2002	Australia U-20	4	(3)
2004–2015	Australia	86	(41)
- * Club domestic league appearances and goals as of 16 October 2015 ‡ National team caps and goals as of 4 July 2015

Kathryn Anne "Kate" Gill (born 10 December 1984) is an Australian former soccer player. She played the majority of her career in Australia, in the Women's National Soccer League (WNSL) and the W-League. She also played in Sweden in the Damallsvenskan. Between 2004 and 2015, Gill played 86 matches for the Australia women's national soccer team. She is a striker.

== Early life ==
Born in New Zealand and schooled in Australia, Gill graduated from Hunter Valley Grammar School in 2002.

== Club career ==
Gill played for the Northern NSW Pride in the Australian Women's National Soccer League.

In 2008, Gill played for the Newcastle Jets in the W-League, before moving to Sweden where she played with Sunnanå SK of Skellefteå in the Damallsvenskan league during 2009. In the upcoming winter, she moved to LdB Malmö for the 2010 season.

== International career ==
Gill made her debut for Australia in 2004 against New Zealand in Brisbane. As of July 2014 she has played 83 times and scored 40 goals for the Matildas.

== Post-football career ==
In 2016, Gill announced her retirement from playing. In 2020, Gill became a joint chief executive of the Professional Footballers Australia, the Australia soccer players union.

== Career statistics ==
=== International ===
Scores and results list Australia's goal tally first, score column indicates score after each Gill goal.

List of international goals scored by Kate Gill
No.	Date	Venue	Opponent	Score	Result	Competition
1	4 March 2004	Govind Park, Ba, Fiji	Papua New Guinea	1–0	10–0	2004 Olympics qualifying
2	4 March 2004	Govind Park, Ba, Fiji	Papua New Guinea	2–0	10–0	2004 Olympics qualifying
3	4 March 2004	Govind Park, Ba, Fiji	Papua New Guinea	6–0	10–0	2004 Olympics qualifying
4	6 March 2004	Govind Park, Ba, Fiji	Fiji	7–0	7–0	2004 Olympics qualifying
5	2 February 2005	Quanzhou Sports Center, Quanzhou, China	Russia	3–0	5–0	2005 Four Nations Tournament
6	2 February 2005	Quanzhou Sports Center, Quanzhou, China	Russia	4–0	5–0	2005 Four Nations Tournament
7	16 July 2005	Minyuan Stadium, Tianjin, China	China	1–0	2–1	Friendly
8	25 May 2006	Melbourne Cricket Ground, Melbourne, Australia	Mexico	1–1	2–1	Friendly
9	24 July 2006	Marden Sports Complex, Adelaide, Australia	Thailand	4–0	5–0	2006 AFC Women's Asian Cup
10	23 February 2007	Zhongshan Soccer Stadium, Taipei, Taiwan	Uzbekistan	1–0	10–0	2008 Olympics qualifying
11	25 February 2007	Zhongshan Soccer Stadium, Taipei, Taiwan	Chinese Taipei	1–0	8–1	2008 Olympics qualifying
12	25 February 2007	Zhongshan Soccer Stadium, Taipei, Taiwan	Chinese Taipei	2–0	8–1	2008 Olympics qualifying
13	25 February 2007	Zhongshan Soccer Stadium, Taipei, Taiwan	Chinese Taipei	4–1	8–1	2008 Olympics qualifying
14	25 February 2007	Zhongshan Soccer Stadium, Taipei, Taiwan	Chinese Taipei	5–1	8–1	2008 Olympics qualifying
15	25 February 2007	Zhongshan Soccer Stadium, Taipei, Taiwan	Chinese Taipei	8–1	8–1	2008 Olympics qualifying
16	7 April 2007	BCU International Stadium, Coffs Harbour, Australia	Hong Kong	4–0	15–0	2008 Olympics qualifying
17	7 April 2007	BCU International Stadium, Coffs Harbour, Australia	Hong Kong	6–0	15–0	2008 Olympics qualifying
18	7 April 2007	BCU International Stadium, Coffs Harbour, Australia	Hong Kong	9–0	15–0	2008 Olympics qualifying
19	7 April 2007	BCU International Stadium, Coffs Harbour, Australia	Hong Kong	10–0	15–0	2008 Olympics qualifying
20	7 April 2007	BCU International Stadium, Coffs Harbour, Australia	Hong Kong	15–0	15–0	2008 Olympics qualifying
21	15 April 2007	Zhongshan Soccer Stadium, Taipei, Taiwan	Chinese Taipei	1–0	10–0	2008 Olympics qualifying
22	15 April 2007	Zhongshan Soccer Stadium, Taipei, Taiwan	Chinese Taipei	3–0	10–0	2008 Olympics qualifying
23	15 April 2007	Zhongshan Soccer Stadium, Taipei, Taiwan	Chinese Taipei	8–0	10–0	2008 Olympics qualifying
24	12 August 2007	BCU International Stadium, Coffs Harbour, Australia	Chinese Taipei	7–0	7–0	2008 Olympics qualifying
25	3 March 2008	Stockland Park, Sunshine Coast, Australia	New Zealand	1–0	2–1	Friendly
26	27 April 2008	WakeMed Soccer Park, Cary, United States	United States	1–2	2–3	Friendly
27	3 March 2010	Spencer Park, Brisbane, Australia	North Korea	1–1	2–2	Friendly
28	6 March 2010	Ballymore Stadium, Brisbane, Australia	North Korea	2–1	3–2	Friendly
29	27 May 2010	Chengdu Sports Centre, Chengdu, China	Japan	1–0	1–0	2010 AFC Women's Asian Cup
30	17 October 2010	Suwon World Cup Stadium, Suwon, South Korea	Mexico	2–0	3–1	2010 Peace Queen Cup
31	19 October 2010	Suwon World Cup Stadium, Suwon, South Korea	Chinese Taipei	1–0	1–0	2010 Peace Queen Cup
32	23 October 2010	Suwon World Cup Stadium, Suwon, South Korea	South Korea	1–2	1–2	2010 Peace Queen Cup
33	13 September 2012	Carroll Stadium, Indianapolis, United States	Haiti	2–0	4–0	Friendly
34	20 November 2012	Bao'an Stadium, Shenzhen, China	Chinese Taipei	1–0	7–0	2013 EAFF Women's East Asian Cup preliminary round 2
35	20 November 2012	Bao'an Stadium, Shenzhen, China	Chinese Taipei	7–0	7–0	2013 EAFF Women's East Asian Cup preliminary round 2
36	22 November 2012	Bao'an Stadium, Shenzhen, China	Hong Kong	3–0	4–0	2013 EAFF Women's East Asian Cup preliminary round 2
37	24 November 2012	Bao'an Stadium, Shenzhen, China	China	1–1	1–2	2013 EAFF Women's East Asian Cup preliminary round 2
38	9 April 2014	Queensland Sport and Athletics Centre, Brisbane, Australia	Brazil	1–0	2–1	Friendly
39	16 May 2014	Thống Nhất Stadium, Ho Chi Minh City, Vietnam	Jordan	1–0	3–1	2014 AFC Women's Asian Cup
40	16 May 2014	Thống Nhất Stadium, Ho Chi Minh City, Vietnam	Jordan	2–0	3–1	2014 AFC Women's Asian Cup
41	9 March 2015	GSZ Stadium, Larnaca, Cyprus	Finland	1–0	3–0	2015 Cyprus Cup

== Honours ==
LdB FC Malmö

- Damallsvenskan: 2010

Perth Glory

- W-League Premiership: 2014

Australia U20

- OFC U-20 Women's Championship: 2002

Australia

- AFC Women's Asian Cup: 2010

Individual

- AFC Women's Player of the Year: 2010
- W-League Golden Boot: 2012–13, 2014

== See also ==
- Women's soccer in Australia

Sporting positions
Preceded by Clare Polkinghorne	Australia captain 2014; Served alongside: Clare Polkinghorne	Succeeded by Clare Polkinghorne
