= Tammy Ogston =

Australian soccer referee

- Full name: Tammy Nicole Ogston
- Born: July 26, 1970 (age 56); Brisbane, Queensland, Australia
- Other occupation: Administrator

Domestic
Years	League	Role
1993–2008	Football Brisbane	Referee
1993–2008	Football Queensland	Referee

International
Years	League	Role
1997–2008	FIFA listed	Referee

Tammy Ogston (born 26 July 1970) is a former Australian football referee from Brisbane, Queensland.

Ogston began playing football at age 14 before moving into officiating in 1993, aged 23, on recognising that there were not enough officials in her area to cover Women's football games. She qualified as a full referee in the Football Brisbane leagues before moving up to Football Queensland.

She was on the FIFA list of international referees between 1997 and 2008, officiating in a number of tournaments around the world including the 2000 Olympic football tournament in Sydney.

Ogston appeared at the 1999 FIFA Women's World Cup and then refereed four matches in the 2003 FIFA Women's World Cup in the US, including the third place decider match between the USA and Canada. She then participated in the 2006 FIFA U-20 Women's World Championship in Russia.

Chosen as one of the referees for the 2007 FIFA Women's World Cup in China, Ogston again refereed four matches including the tournament opener and the final, becoming the first referee in the world to officiate at both of those games in one World Cup competition. She is also the first Australian, male or female, to referee a World Cup Final.

In 2008 she became Australia's first female FIFA Futuro Instructor, involved in development of International, National and local referees; in 2011 Ogston retired from all forms of football.

In 2016, Ogston was admitted to the FFA Football Federation Australia Hall of Fame.
