= Bentla D'Coth =

Indian football referee

Personal information
- Full name: Bentla D'Coth
- Date of birth: 29 May 1969 (age 57)
- Place of birth: Ernakulam, Kerala, India
- Position: Midfielder

Senior career*
| Years | Team | Apps | (Gls) |
- Kerala

International career
| 1994–1999 | India | | |
- * Club domestic league appearances and goals

Bentla D'Coth (born 29 May 1969) is a football referee and former footballer from India. She is the first woman to be an international football referee from South Asia.
