= Joanne Peters =

Australian footballer (born 1979)

Joanne "Joey" Peters
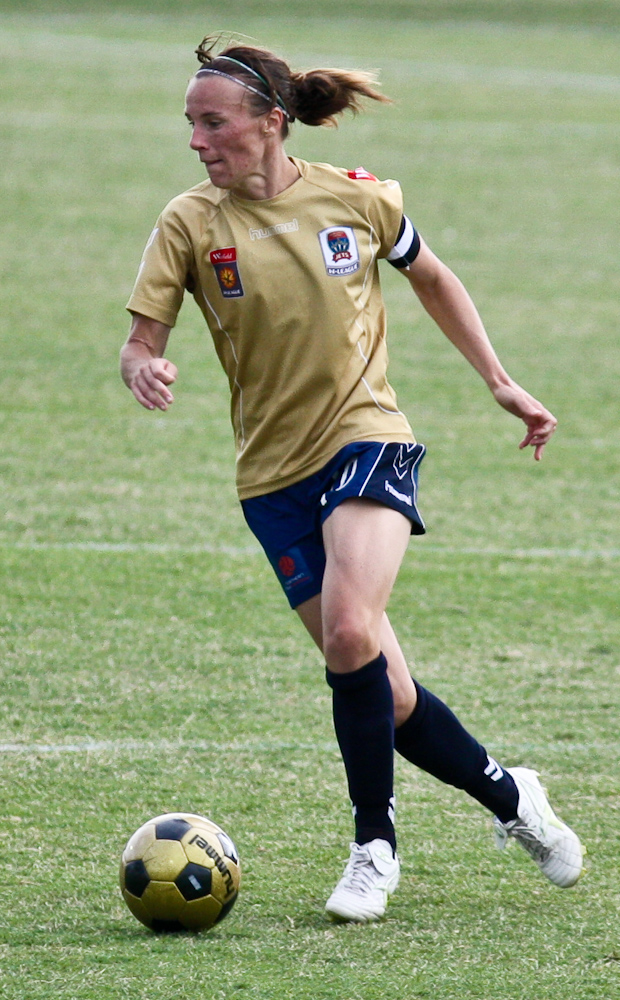
- Playing for the Newcastle Jets, 2008

Personal information
- Full name: Joanne Elsa Peters
- Date of birth: 11 March 1979 (age 47)
- Place of birth: Leeton, New South Wales, Australia
- Height: 1.72 m (5 ft 7 1/2 in)
- Position: Central midfielder

Youth career
- Leeton United
- Sylvania Heights

Senior career*
Years	Team	Apps	(Gls)
- Northern NSW Pride
1999–2002	NSW Sapphires		
2002	Charlotte Lady Eagles		
2002	Santos		
2003	New York Power		
2005	KIF Örebro DFF		
- Sydney United
- Sydney Olympic
2008	Newcastle Jets	11	(1)

International career^{‡}
1996–2009	Australia	110	(28)
- * Club domestic league appearances and goals as of 9 March 2009 ‡ National team caps and goals as of 9 March 2009

Joanne "Joey" Elsa Peters (born 11 March 1979) is an Australian former soccer player who last played for the Newcastle Jets in the Australian W-League. She played for Brazilian club, Santos (2002), becoming the first Australian woman to play professional football in South America. Peters also was one of the first Australians to represent a team in the Women's United Soccer Association in 2003, when she joined New York Power. Internationally she represented Australia as a central midfielder for the Matildas from March 1996 to February 2009 for 110 games and scored 28 goals.

== Biography ==
=== Early years ===
Joanne "Joey" Elsa Peters was born on 11 March 1979 in Leeton, New South Wales. Her father is a Uniting Church minister. From five years old she played football in a boys team, following her older brother. Peters captained Leeton Public School's team, which won the 1990 New South Wales Primary Schools Girls knockout tournament. Her first club, Leeton United Juniors, played in the Griffith District Football Association. As a teenager, the family moved to Sydney, where her father was reassigned.

=== Club career ===
After attending the Australian Institute of Sport and the NSW Institute of Sport (1997), Peters was signed by Northern NSW Pride in the Australian Women's National Soccer League (WNSL). She played for NSW Sapphires from 1999 and won the Julie Dolan Medal for the best player in the WNSL for the 2001/2002 season. From August to December 2002 she had a stint with Brazilian club Santos, becoming the first Australian woman to play professional football in South America. She signed with the New York Power in the Women's United Soccer Association in February 2003.

Peters last played with the Newcastle Jets in the Australian W-League's inaugural year, 2008–2009.

=== International career ===
Peters made her debut for Australia in March 1996 in a friendly against New Zealand in Auckland, where she scored her first goal for the Matildas in their 0-3 victory over the hosts. At the 1998 OFC Women's Championship, held in Auckland in October, the midfielder kicked four goals in Australia's 17-0 victory over Fiji. For the 2003 OFC Women's Championship she scored another four goals in a game against Samoa (19-0) held in Canberra in April 2003.

She played her last international football match in February 2009 against Italy in Canberra. She had played 110 times for the Australian team, scoring 28 times. The retiring Matilda had attended three Women's World Cups (1999, 2003, 2007) and one Olympic Games (2004). Peters recalled her fondest international memories, "Personally, scoring a goal in the Athens Olympics against the USA, that drew the game and that's the best result we've had with them. We were playing the Dream Team, if you like. They had the world’s best player, Mia Hamm, and it was their last tournament with that team. From a team perspective, the last World Cup was a definite highlight."

== International goals ==
No.	Date	Venue	Opponent	Score	Result	Competition
1.	24 March 1996	Ken Maunder Park, Auckland, New Zealand	New Zealand	2–0	3-0	Friendly
2.	9 October 1998	Mount Smart Stadium, Auckland, New Zealand	American Samoa	15-0	21-0	OFC Championship and World Cup qualifier
3.	15 October 1998	Mount Smart Stadium, Auckland, New Zealand	Fiji	10-0	17-0	OFC Championship and World Cup qualifier
4.	15 October 1998	Mount Smart Stadium, Auckland, New Zealand	Fiji	11-0	17-0	OFC Championship and World Cup qualifier
5.	15 October 1998	Mount Smart Stadium, Auckland, New Zealand	Fiji	13-0	17-0	OFC Championship and World Cup qualifier
6.	15 October 1998	Mount Smart Stadium, Auckland, New Zealand	Fiji	16-0	17-0	OFC Championship and World Cup qualifier
7.	16 January 2002	Lavington Sports Ground, Albury, Australia	South Korea	1–0	1–0	Australia Cup
8.	6 October 2002	SAS Stadium, Cary, United States	Russia	2–0	2–0	Women's U.S. Cup
9.	5 April 2003	McKellar Park, Canberra, Australia	Samoa	1–0	19–0	OFC Women's Championship, World Cup qualifier
10.	5 April 2003	McKellar Park, Canberra, Australia	Samoa	4-0	19–0	OFC Women's Championship, World Cup qualifier
11.	5 April 2003	McKellar Park, Canberra, Australia	Samoa	8-0	19–0	OFC Women's Championship, World Cup qualifier
12.	5 April 2003	McKellar Park, Canberra, Australia	Samoa	17-0	19–0	OFC Women's Championship, World Cup qualifier
13.	9 April 2003	McKellar Park, Canberra, Australia	Papua New Guinea	2–0	13–0	OFC Women's Championship, World Cup qualifier
14.	13 April 2003	McKellar Park, Canberra, Australia	New Zealand	1–0	2–0	OFC Women's Championship, World Cup qualifier
15.	4 March 2004	Govind Park, Ba, Fiji	Papua New Guinea	7–0	10–0	Olympic Qualifiers
16.	17 August 2004	Kaftanzoglio Stadium, Thessaloniki, Greece	United States	1–1	1–1	Olympic Games
17.	29 March 2005	Seymour Shaw Park, Sydney, Australia	Japan	1–0	2–1	Friendly
18.	16 July 2005	Minyuan Stadium, Tianjin, China	China	2–1	2–1	Friendly
19.	23 July 2005	Tokyo, Japan	Japan	2–0	2–4	Friendly
20.	28 November 2005	Mingara Recreation Club, Central Coast, Australia	China	1–0	3–1	Friendly
21.	28 May 2006	Lakeside Stadium, Melbourne, Australia	Mexico	2–0	3–0	Friendly
22.	27 July 2006	Hindmarsh Stadium, Adelaide, Australia	Japan	2–0	2–0	2006 AFC Women's Asian Cup
23.	30 July 2006	Hindmarsh Stadium, Adelaide, Australia	China	2–0	2–2 (a.e.t.) (2–4 p)	2006 AFC Women's Asian Cup
24.	25 February 2007	Zhongshan Soccer Stadium, Taipei, Taiwan	Chinese Taipei	6–1	8–1	2008 Summer Olympics qualification
25.	7 April 2007	BCU International Stadium, Coffs Harbour, Australia	Hong Kong	5–0	15–0	2008 Summer Olympics qualification
26.	15 April 2007	Zhongshan Soccer Stadium, Taipei, Taiwan	Chinese Taipei	6–0	10–0	2008 Summer Olympics qualification
27.	15 April 2007	Zhongshan Soccer Stadium, Taipei, Taiwan	Chinese Taipei	8–0	10–0	2008 Summer Olympics qualification
28.	12 August 2007	BCU International Stadium, Coffs Harbour, Australia	Chinese Taipei	5–0	7–0	2008 Summer Olympics qualification

== Coaching career ==
In 2009 Peters was a coach with the Australian under-16 women's national team.

== Honours ==
- Julie Dolan Medal: WNSL 2001/2002.
- Australian Women's Footballer of the Year: 2009
- Football Australia Hall of Fame inductee: 2010

== See also ==
- List of women's footballers with 100 or more international caps
