= April Mann =

Australian soccer player

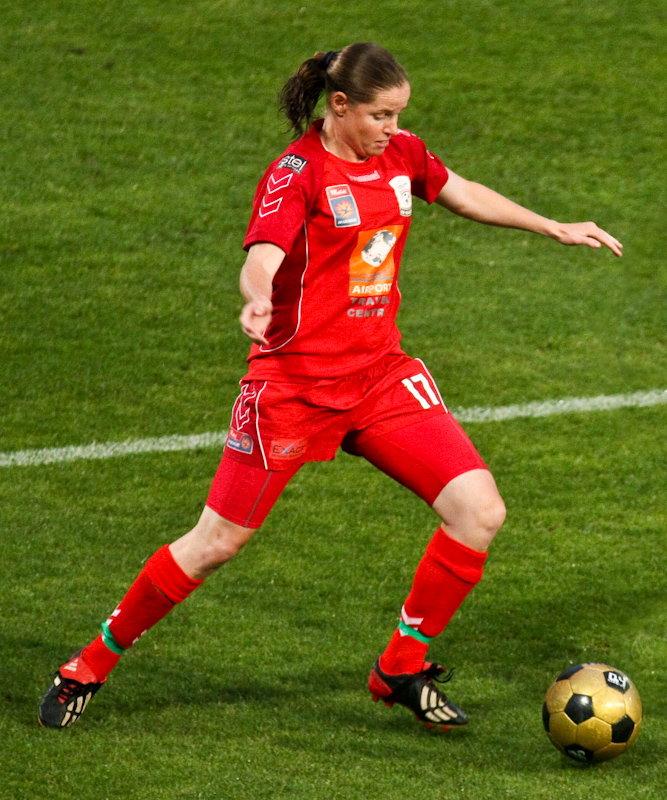
- Mann playing for Adelaide United in 2008

Personal information
- Full name: April Mann
- Date of birth: 21 April 1978 (age 48)
- Place of birth: Australia
- Height: 1.64 m (5 ft 5 in)
- Position: Midfielder

Senior career*
Years	Team	Apps	(Gls)
1996–2004	Queensland Sting		
2005	Western Waves		
2008–2009	Adelaide United	8	(0)

International career^{‡}
2001–2004	Australia	28	(18)
- * Club domestic league appearances and goals ‡ National team caps and goals as of 3 October 2016

April Mann (born 21 April 1978) is an Australian retired soccer player.

Mann played for Queensland Sting and Western Waves in the Australian Women's National Soccer League, and Adelaide United in the Australian W-League.

Mann made 28 appearances for Australia between 2001 and 2004, including two matches at the 2003 FIFA Women's World Cup.
