= Kelly Golebiowski =

Australian soccer player

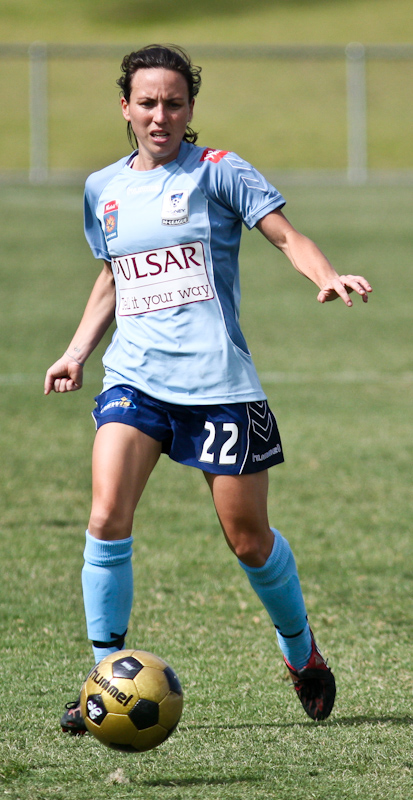

Personal information
- Full name: Kelly Maree Golebiowski
- Date of birth: 26 July 1981 (age 45)
- Place of birth: Sydney, Australia
- Height: 1.56 m (5 ft 1 in)
- Position: Midfielder

Senior career*
Years	Team	Apps	(Gls)
?	NSW Sapphires		
2001–2002	Hampton Roads Piranhas		
2003	Washington Freedom	19	(2)
2005–?	Hampton Roads Piranhas		
?	Washington Freedom		
2008–2009	Sydney FC	4	(0)
2009	Central Coast Mariners	9	(1)

International career^{‡}
1996–2005	Australia	64	(14)
- * Club domestic league appearances and goals as of 12 May 2014 ‡ National team caps and goals as of 12 May 2014

Kelly Maree Golebiowski (born 26 July 1981 in Sydney, Australia) is a former Australian soccer player who played at national league level in Australia and the United States.

== Playing career ==
=== Club career ===
Golebiowski played in the Australian Women's National Soccer League for NSW Sapphires.

Between 2001 and 2002 Golebiowski played for Hampton Roads Piranhas in the USL W-League.

In 2003 Golebiowski played 19 matches for the Washington Freedom in the final season of the Women's United Soccer Association (WUSA).

After her stint with the Freedom, she rejoined the Piranhas.

Golebiowski later returned to the Washington Freedom, who had joined the USL W-League.

She played for Sydney FC during the 2008–09 season of the Australian W-League.

Golebiowski joined the Central Coast Mariners for the 2009 season.

=== International career ===
In July 1996, Golebiowski made her debut for Australia as a 14-year-old.

She represented Australia at the 1999 FIFA Women's World Cup, 2000 Olympics, and 2003 FIFA Women's World Cup.
