= Cheryl Salisbury =

Australian soccer player (born 1974)

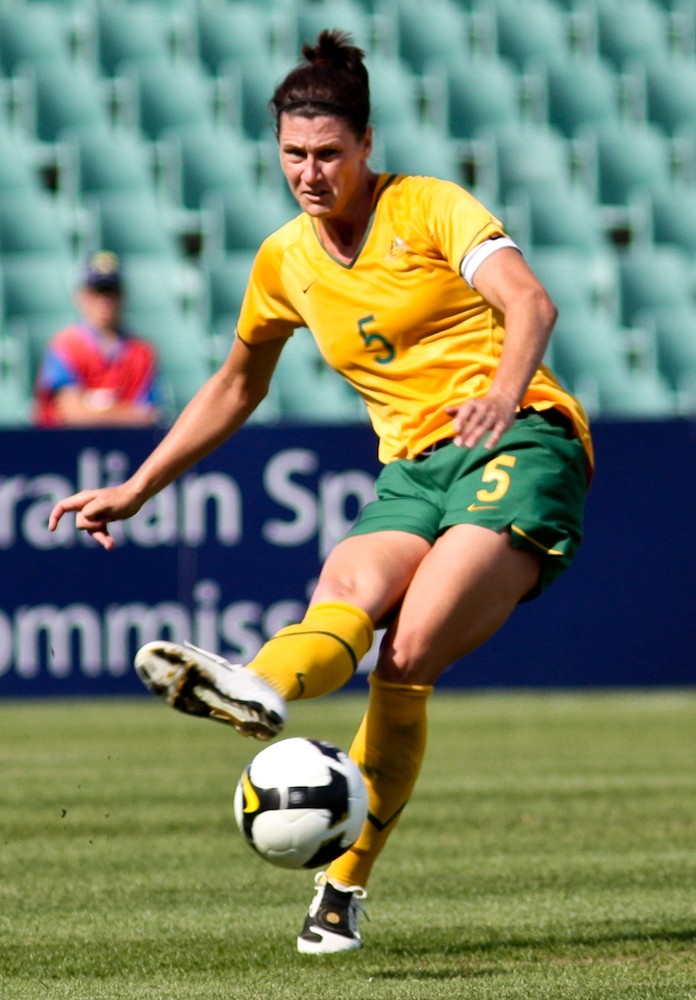
- Salisbury with Australia in 2009

Personal information
- Full name: Cheryl Ann Salisbury
- Date of birth: 8 March 1974 (age 52)
- Place of birth: Newcastle, Australia
- Height: 1.80 m (5 ft 11 in)
- Position: Centre back

Youth career
- Lambton
- AIS

Senior career*
Years	Team	Apps	(Gls)
1995–1996	Panasonic Bambina		
1997	Takarazuka Bunnys		
2002	Memphis Mercury		
2003	New York Power	13	(3)
2008–2010	Newcastle Jets	7	(1)

International career^{‡}
1994–2009	Australia	151	(38)
- * Club domestic league appearances and goals as of 9 March 2009 ‡ National team caps and goals as of 3 July 2011

Cheryl Ann Salisbury (born 8 March 1974) is an Australian former association football player. She represented Australia internationally as a defender from 1994 until 2009, winning 151 caps.

== Biography ==
She most recently played as a defender for the New York Power in the WUSA and for the Newcastle United Jets in the W-League. She went on to become coach of the Broadmeadow Magic team in the Northern NSW Herald Women's Premier League competition.

Salisbury was captain of the Australian female national team, the Matildas from 2003 until she retired in 2009. As at February 2025, she is Australia's fourth equal highest female international goalscorer, with 38 goals in representative fixtures. Salisbury became only the second Australian female to play 100 A-internationals, which she achieved during the 2004 Summer Olympics. In 1999, Salisbury and 12 teammates posed for a nude calendar photoshoot to raise money for the national women's football team.

On 27 January 2009, she announced she would retire after the game against Italy at Parramatta Stadium. The game finished as a 2–2 draw, with Salisbury scoring a penalty. The veteran of 151 international appearances received a standing ovation as she was substituted with six minutes remaining.

In 2009, Salisbury was inducted into the Australian Football Hall of Fame, in the Hall of Champions category.

In 2017, Salisbury was awarded the Alex Tobin Medal by the Professional Footballers Australia, and in 2019 she became the first women's footballer to be inducted into the Sport Australia Hall of Fame.

== Honours ==
=== Country ===
Australia

- OFC Women's Nations Cup: 1994, 1998, 2003
- In 2020, a river-class ferry on the Sydney Ferries network was named in her honour.

== International goals ==
Scores and results list Australia's goal tally first.

No.	Date	Venue	Opponent	Score	Result	Competition
1.	16 October 1994	Port Moresby, Papua New Guinea	Papua New Guinea	?–0	7–0	1994 OFC Women's Championship
2.	16 October 1994	Port Moresby, Papua New Guinea	Papua New Guinea	?–0	7–0	1994 OFC Women's Championship
3.	19 October 1994	Port Moresby, Papua New Guinea	Papua New Guinea	?–0	4–0	1994 OFC Women's Championship
8.	24 August 1997	Tallinn, Estonia	Estonia	1–1	5–1	Friendly
9.	24 August 1997	Tallinn, Estonia	Estonia	4–1	5–1	Friendly
10.	19 November 1997	Newcastle, Australia	China	2–0	2–0	Friendly
11.	9 October 1998	Auckland, New Zealand	American Samoa	4–0	21–0	1998 OFC Women's Championship
12.	9 October 1998	Auckland, New Zealand	American Samoa	10–0	21–0	1998 OFC Women's Championship
13.	9 October 1998	Auckland, New Zealand	American Samoa	14–0	21–0	1998 OFC Women's Championship
14.	9 October 1998	Auckland, New Zealand	American Samoa	17–0	21–0	1998 OFC Women's Championship
15.	9 October 1998	Auckland, New Zealand	American Samoa	19–0	21–0	1998 OFC Women's Championship
16.	11 October 1998	Auckland, New Zealand	Papua New Guinea	5–0	8–0	1998 OFC Women's Championship
17.	11 October 1998	Auckland, New Zealand	Papua New Guinea	6–0	8–0	1998 OFC Women's Championship
18.	11 October 1998	Auckland, New Zealand	Papua New Guinea	7–0	8–0	1998 OFC Women's Championship
19.	15 October 1998	Auckland, New Zealand	Fiji	17–0	17–0	1998 OFC Women's Championship
20.	8 January 1999	Sydney, Australia	Italy	1–1	1–1 (a.e.t.) (3–4 p)	1999 Australia Cup
21.	13 January 1999	Canberra, Australia	Italy	1–0	1–0	1999 Australia Cup
22.	26 June 1999	East Rutherford, United States	China	1–2	1–3	1999 FIFA Women's World Cup
23.	31 October 1999	Xiamen, China	China	2–4	2–4	Friendly
24.	16 September 2000	Sydney, Australia	Sweden	1–1	1–1	2000 Summer Olympics
25.	11 January 2001	Coffs Harbour, Australia	France	2–0	2–1	2001 Australia Cup
26.	9 April 2003	Canberra, Australia	Papua New Guinea	3–0	13–0	2003 OFC Women's Championship
27.	9 April 2003	Canberra, Australia	Papua New Guinea	12–0	13–0	2003 OFC Women's Championship
28.	6 September 2003	Livingston, Scotland	Scotland	1–0	1–0	Friendly
29.	1 February 2005	Quanzhou, China	Russia	5–0	5–0	2005 Four Nations Tournament
30.	25 May 2006	Melbourne, Australia	Mexico	2–1	2–1	Friendly
31.	7 April 2007	Coffs Harbour, Australia	Hong Kong	14–0	15–0	2008 Summer Olympics qualification
32.	7 April 2007	Coffs Harbour, Australia	Hong Kong	15–0	15–0	2008 Summer Olympics qualification
33.	15 April 2007	Taipei, Taiwan	Chinese Taipei	9–0	10–0	2008 Summer Olympics qualification
34.	20 September 2007	Chengdu, China	Canada	2–2	2–2	2007 FIFA Women's World Cup
35.	5 March 2008	Sunshine Coast, Australia	New Zealand	2–2	4–2	Friendly
36.	5 March 2008	Sunshine Coast, Australia	New Zealand	3–2	4–2	Friendly
37.	27 April 2008	Cary, United States	United States	2–2	2–2	Friendly
38.	31 January 2009	Sydney, Australia	Italy	2–1	2–2	Friendly

== See also ==
- List of women's footballers with 100 or more international caps
