= Zhongshan Soccer Stadium =

Sports venue in Taipei, Taiwan

- Interactive map of Zhongshan Soccer Stadium
- Location: Taipei, Taiwan
- Coordinates: 25°4′10.2″N 121°31′15.8″E
- Owner: Taipei Sports Office
- Operator: Taipei Sports Office
- Capacity: 20,000 (Football); 40,000 (Concerts)
- Surface: Grass
- Field size: 300 x 184 m

Construction
- Opened: 1989
- Closed: 2008

Zhongshan Soccer Stadium
- Traditional Chinese: 中山足球場
- Simplified Chinese: 中山足球场
Transcriptions
Standard Mandarin
- Hanyu Pinyin: Zhōngshān Zúqiúchǎng
- Wade–Giles: Chungshan Tsuch'iu-ch'ang
- Tongyong Pinyin: Jhōngshān Zúcióuchǎng
Southern Min
- Hokkien POJ: Tiong-soaⁿ Chiok-kiû-tiûⁿ

Zhongshan Soccer Stadium, Chungshan Soccer Stadium, or Taipei Soccer Stadium (Chinese: 中山足球場; pinyin: Zhōngshān Zúqíuchǎng) is a community garden housed in a former multi-purpose stadium in Zhongshan District, Taipei, Taiwan.

== History ==
In 1923, Maruyama Stadium (Japanese: 圓山運動場) opened on the current site of Zhongshan Soccer Stadium, during the Japanese period. It was later the site of the Yuanshan Baseball Ground (Chinese: 圓山棒球場).

Zhongshan Soccer Stadium opened in 1989, constructed under the guidance of then Chinese Taipei Football Association President Chiang Wei-kuo. Although it was built as a soccer-specific stadium, it was mostly used for live concerts or other activities due to lack of professional football league in Taiwan. The stadium was able to hold 20,000 people for football games and 40,000 for concerts. It was managed by the Hope Foundation led by former athlete Chi Cheng.

=== Events ===
The stadium hosted a number of concerts by internationally renowned music stars. American singer Michael Jackson performed two sold-out concerts at the stadium on October 18 and 22, 1996, during his HIStory World Tour, with a 98,000 attendance. Bon Jovi performed at the stadium on April 28, 1995, during These Days Tour. The global superstar Beyonce performed at the stadium on November 12, 2007, as the final show of her first headlining world tour, The Beyoncé Experience. Australian pop star Kylie Minogue performed there on December 4, 2008, as part of her KylieX2008 world tour.

=== Closure ===
In March 2007, Taipei City Government announced that Yuanshan Park (now part of Taipei Expo Park) would replace Guandu Nature Park as the main venue of the 2010 International Garden and Horticulture Exhibition to be hosted in Taipei. Zhongshan Soccer Stadium, being one of the major parts of the Yuanshan area, would serve as the primary venue of the exhibition featuring indoor activities.

To prepare for the expo, the stadium was closed in 2008. Its closure was delayed by a few months, so that it could host the 2010 FIFA World Cup qualification and 2008 AFC Challenge Cup qualifiers, as it was the only FIFA-approved soccer stadium in Taiwan at the time.

=== Integration into Expo Park ===
As planned by the Taipei City Government, the stadium was later integrated into Taipei Expo Park, hosting such amenities like the Expo Dome and MAJI Hall. The seating area of the former stadium now functions as a community garden, where about 500 people tend to about 1,400 planters.

== Transportation ==
The stadium is accessible within walking distance from Yuanshan Station of the Taipei Metro.

== Gallery ==
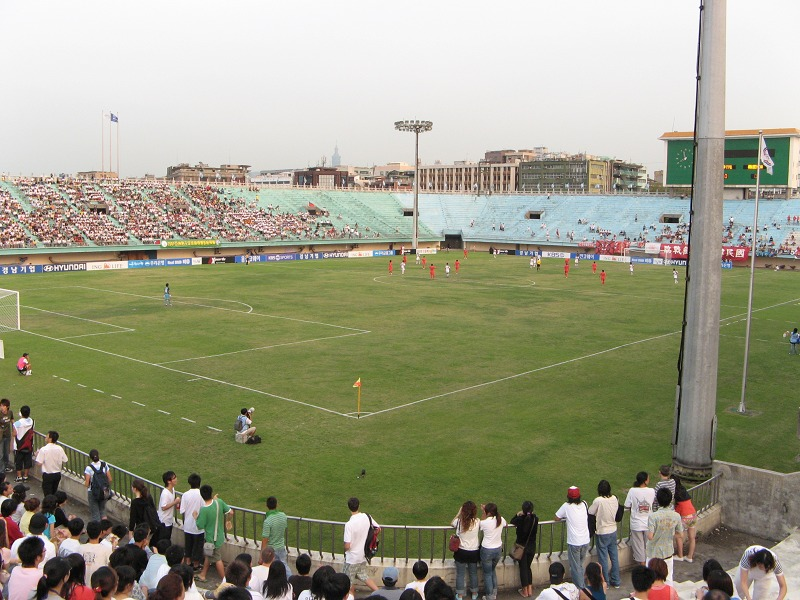
Chinese Taipei played home against South Korea in 2007 AFC Asian Cup qualification.

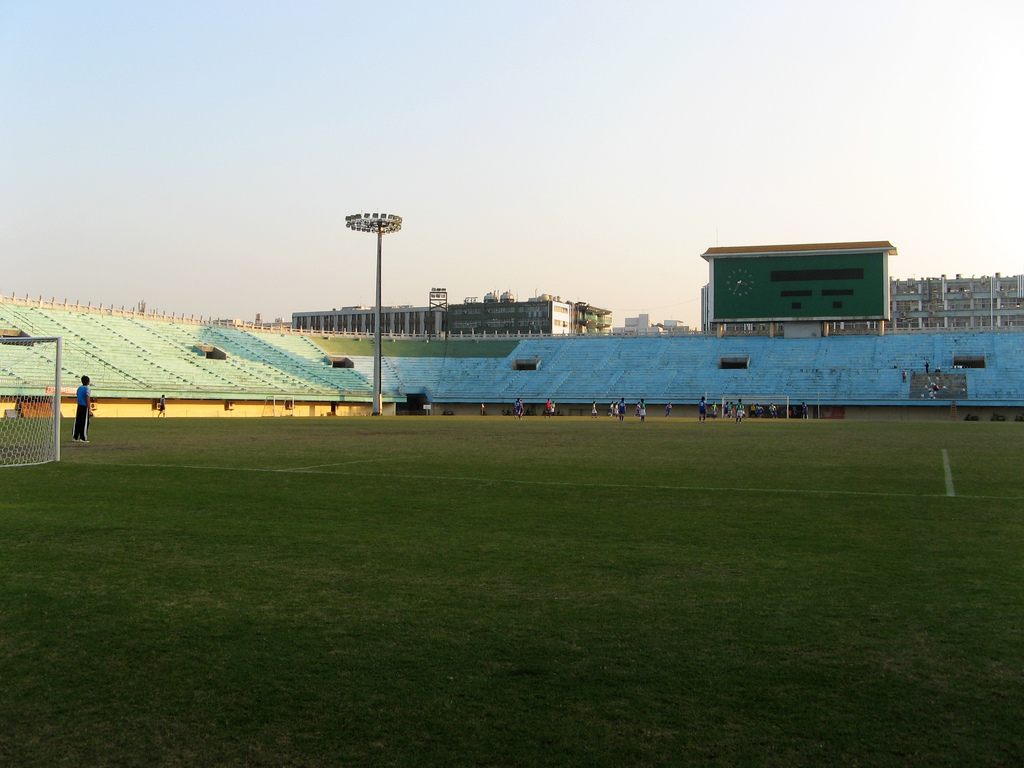
Zhongshan Soccer Stadium
