= List of Australian women's soccer champions =

- Women's National Soccer League (1996–2004)
- A-League Women (2008–present)
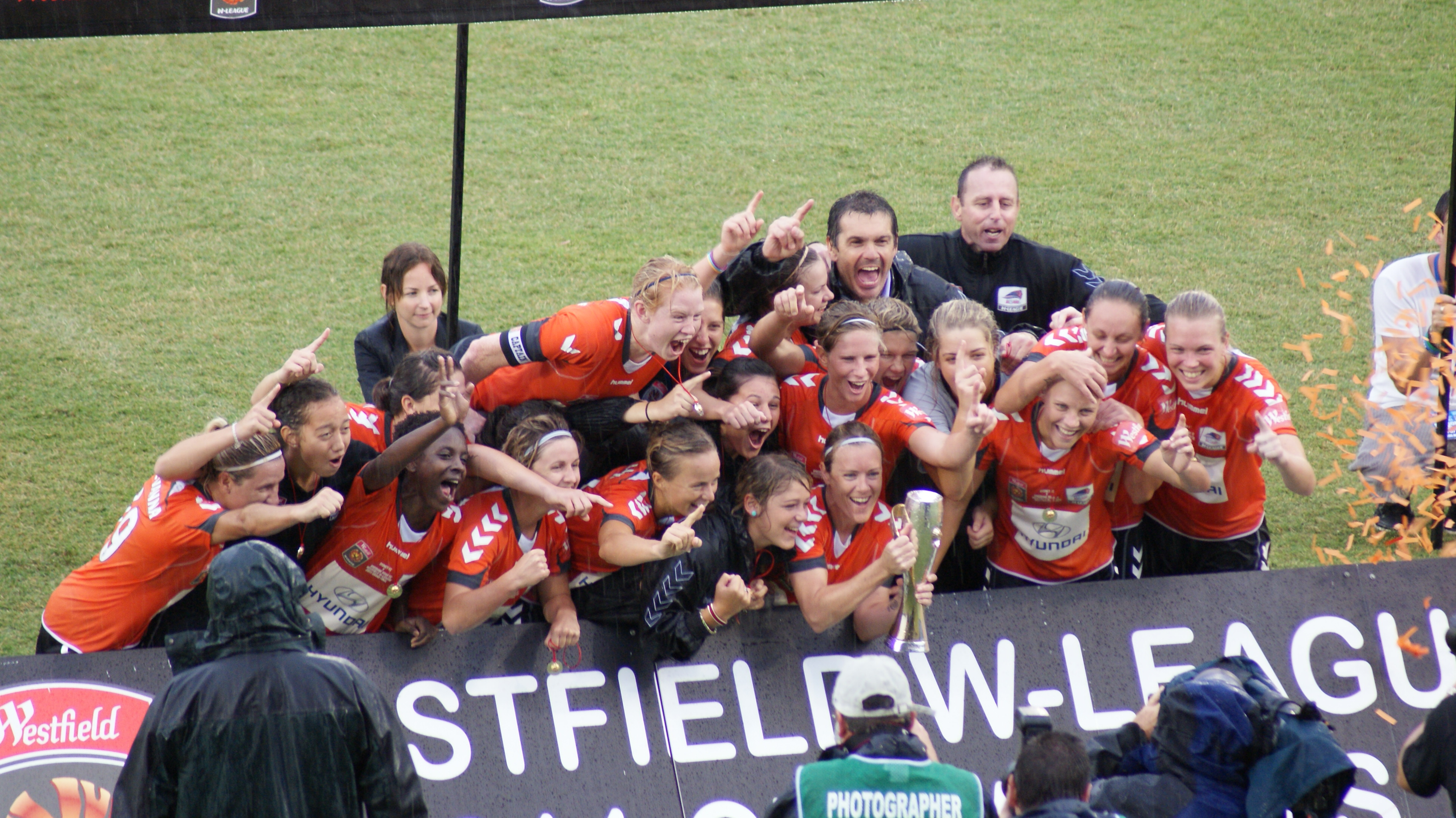
- Brisbane Roar celebrate winning the 2011 W-League grand final

Country
- Australia

Founded
- 1996

Number of teams
- 11 (as of 2025–26)

Current champions
- Melbourne City (2025–26)

Most successful club
- Melbourne City; Sydney FC (5 championships each)

The Australian women's soccer champions are the champions of the top level league in Australian women's soccer.

The Women's National Soccer League (WNSL) was established as 1996 as the first national domestic league in women's soccer in Australia. Queensland Academy of Sport (then known as Queensland Sting) became the first women's champions in Australia. Following the demise of the WNSL in 2004 alongside the men's NSL, the W-League (now A-League Women) was formed three seasons after the men's A-League in 2008. Queensland Roar (now Brisbane Roar) were the inaugural champions of the W-League.

== List of champions ==
=== Women's National Soccer League (1996–2004) ===
Season	Champions (number of titles)	Score	Runners-up	Winning head coach
1996–97	Queensland Academy of Sport	2–1	SASI Pirates	(Australia) Greg Brown
1997–98	NSW Institute of Sport	3–2	SASI Pirates	(Australia) Mark Jones
1998–99	SASI Pirates	2–1	Canberra Eclipse	(Australia) Kevin McCormack
1999	NSW Sapphires (2)	1–0	SASI Pirates	(Cameroon) Cyrille Ndongo-Keller
2000	Queensland Sting (2)	1–0	NSW Sapphires	(England) Mike Mulvey
2001–02	Canberra Eclipse	1–0	NSW Sapphires	(Australia) Clive Mackillop
2002	Queensland Sting (3)	1–0	NSW Sapphires	
2003	NSW Sapphires (3)	3–1	Queensland Sting	
2004	Queensland Sting (4)	2–0	Northern NSW Pride	

=== A-League Women (2008–present) ===
Season	Champions (number of titles)	Score	Runners-up	Winning head coach
2008–09	Queensland Roar	2–0	Canberra United	(Wales) Jeff Hopkins
2009	Sydney FC	3–2	Brisbane Roar	(Australia) Alen Stajcic
2010–11	Brisbane Roar (2)	2–1	Sydney FC	(Wales) Jeff Hopkins
2011–12	Canberra United	3–2	Brisbane Roar	(Czech Republic) Jitka Klimková
2012–13	Sydney FC (2)	3–1	Melbourne Victory	(Australia) Alen Stajcic
2013–14	Melbourne Victory	2–0	Brisbane Roar	(England) David Edmondson
2014	Canberra United (2)	3–1	Perth Glory	(Netherlands) Liesbeth Migchelsen
2015–16	Melbourne City	4–1	Sydney FC	(Australia) Joe Montemurro
2016–17	Melbourne City (2)	2–0	Perth Glory	(Wales) Jess Fishlock
2017–18	Melbourne City (3)	2–0	Sydney FC	(Australia) Patrick Kisnorbo
2018–19	Sydney FC (3)	4–2	Perth Glory	(Australia) Ante Juric
2019–20	Melbourne City (4)	1–0	Sydney FC	(Australia) Rado Vidošić
2020–21	Melbourne Victory (2)	1–0	Sydney FC	(Wales) Jeff Hopkins
2021–22	Melbourne Victory (3)	2–1	Sydney FC	(Wales) Jeff Hopkins
2022–23	Sydney FC (4)	4–0	Western United	(Australia) Ante Juric
2023–24	Sydney FC (5)	1–0	Melbourne City	(Australia) Ante Juric
2024–25	Central Coast Mariners	1–1 (5–4p)	Melbourne Victory	(England) Emily Husband
2025–26	Melbourne City (5)	3–1	Wellington Phoenix	(Australia) Michael Matricciani

Note: Queensland roar rebranded to Brisbane Roar in 2009.

== Total championships won ==
There are 10 clubs which have won the Australian women's top level title. The most recent to join the list were Central Coast Mariners (2024–25), and before that Melbourne City (2015–16 champions) then Melbourne Victory (2013–14).

Three teams have finished as runners-up without ever winning: Northern NSW Pride during the Women's National Soccer League era, Perth Glory, and Western United during the A-League Women era.

Teams in bold currently compete in the A-League Women as of the 2025–26 season.

Rank	Club	Winners	Runners-up	Winning seasons
1	**Sydney FC**	5	6	2009, 2012–13, 2018–19, 2022–23, 2023–24
1	**Melbourne City**	5	1	2015–16, 2016–17, 2017–18, 2019–20, 2025–26
2	Queensland Sting	5	1	1996–97, 2000, 2002, 2004
3	NSW Sapphires	3	3	1997–98, 1999, 2003
3	**Melbourne Victory**	3	2	2013–14, 2020–21, 2021–22
5	**Brisbane Roar**	2	3	2008–09, 2010–11
6	**Canberra United**	2	1	2011–12, 2014
7	Adelaide Sensation	1	3	1998–99
7	Canberra Eclipse	1	1	2001–02
7	**Central Coast Mariners**	1	0	2024–25

=== By city ===
City	Championships	Clubs
Sydney	8	Sydney FC (5), NSW Sapphires (3)
Melbourne	8	Melbourne City (5), Melbourne Victory (3)
Brisbane	6	Queensland Sting (4), Brisbane Roar (2)
Canberra	3	Canberra United (2), Canberra Eclipse (1)
Adelaide	1	Adelaide Sensation (1)
Gosford	1	Central Coast Mariners (1)

=== Australian soccer champions map ===
Location of Australian soccer champions

== Lists of premiers ==
=== Women's National Soccer League (1998–2004) ===
Season	Premiers (number of titles)
1998–99	Canberra Eclipse
1999	NSW Sapphires
2000	Queensland Sting
2001–02	NSW Sapphires (2)
2002	Queensland Sting (2)
2003	Queensland Sting (3)
2004	Queensland Sting (4)

=== W-League / A-League Women (2008–present) ===
Season	Premiers (number of titles)
2008–09	Queensland Roar
2009	Sydney FC
2010–11	Sydney FC (2)
2011–12	Canberra United
2012–13	Brisbane Roar (2)
2013–14	Canberra United (2)
2014	Perth Glory
2015–16	Melbourne City
2016–17	Canberra United (3)
2017–18	Brisbane Roar (3)
2018–19	Melbourne Victory
2019–20	Melbourne City (2)
2020–21	Sydney FC (3)
2021–22	Sydney FC (4)
2022–23	Sydney FC (5)
2023–24	Melbourne City (3)
2024–25	Melbourne City (4)
2025–26	Melbourne City (5)

== Total premierships won ==
Club	Winners	Runners-up	Winning seasons
Sydney FC	5	3	2009, 2010–11, 2020–21, 2021–22, 2022–23
Melbourne City	5	1	2015–16, 2019–20, 2023–24, 2024–25, 2025–26
Queensland Sting	4	0	2000, 2002, 2003, 2004
Brisbane Roar	3	4	2008–09, 2012–13, 2017–18
Canberra United	3	1	2011–12, 2013–14, 2016–17
NSW Sapphires	2	3	1999, 2001–02
Perth Glory	1	2	2014
Melbourne Victory	1	1	2018–19
Canberra Eclipse	1	1	1998–99

Note: Queensland roar rebranded to Brisbane Roar in 2009.

=== By city ===
City	Championships	Clubs
Sydney	7	Sydney FC (5), NSW Sapphires (2)
Brisbane	7	Queensland Sting (4), Brisbane Roar (3)
Melbourne	6	Melbourne City (5), Melbourne Victory (1)
Canberra	4	Canberra United (3), Canberra Eclipse (1)
Perth	1	Perth Glory (1)

=== Australian soccer Premiers map ===
Location of Australian soccer champions

== Multiple trophy wins ==
=== The Double ===
Domestic Double
Club	Season	Titles
NSW Sapphires	1999	Women's NSL Premiership, Women's NSL Championship
Queensland Sting	2000	Women's NSL Premiership, Women's NSL Championship
Queensland Sting	2002	Women's NSL Premiership, Women's NSL Championship
Queensland Sting	2004	Women's NSL Premiership, Women's NSL Championship
Queensland Roar	2008–09	W-League Premiership, W-League Championship
Sydney FC	2009	W-League Premiership, W-League Championship
Canberra United	2011–12	W-League Premiership, W-League Championship
Melbourne City	2015–16	W-League Premiership, W-League Championship
Melbourne City	2019–20	W-League Premiership, W-League Championship
Sydney FC	2022–23	A-League Women Premiership, A-League Women Championship
Melbourne City	2025–26	A-League Women Premiership, A-League Women Championship

=== Total Doubles ===
==== Domestic Double ====
Domestic Double
count	Team	Seasons
3	Melbourne City	2015–16, 2019–20, 2025–26
3	Queensland Sting	2000, 2002, 2004
2	Sydney FC	2009, 2022–23
1	Canberra United	2011–12
1	Brisbane Roar	2008–09
1	NSW Sapphires	1999

== Multiple title winners ==
Clubs in bold play in the A-League Women.

Team	Champions	League Premiers	Continental Winners	Total
**Sydney FC**	5	5	—	10
**Melbourne City**	5	5	—	10
Queensland Sting	5	4	—	9
NSW Sapphires	3	2	—	5
**Brisbane Roar**	2	3	—	5
**Canberra United**	2	3	—	5
**Melbourne Victory**	3	1	—	4
Canberra Eclipse	1	1	—	2
Adelaide Sensation	1	—	—	1
**Central Coast Mariners**	1	—	—	1
**Perth Glory**	—	1	—	1

== See also ==
- List of Australian soccer champions
