= 1997–98 in Australian soccer =

Soccer in Australia
- Season: 1997–98

Men's soccer
- NSL Premiership: South Melbourne
- NSL Championship: South Melbourne

Women's soccer
- Women's NSL: NSW Institute of Sport

The 1996–97 season was the 29th season of national competitive soccer in Australia and 115th overall.

== National teams ==
=== Men's senior ===
==== Results and fixtures ====
===== Friendlies =====
1 October 1997	Tunisia	0–3	Australia	Tunis, Tunisia
		Report	A. Vidmar 1'; Viduka 23'; Bingley 76'	Stadium: El Menzah Stadium; Attendance: 20,000; Referee: Abderrahmane Ben Betka (Algeria)

6 June 1998	Croatia	7–0	Australia	Zagreb, Croatia
	Šuker 14' (pen.), 37', 63' (pen.); Boban 47', 83'; Prosinečki 40'; Kozniku 72'	Report		Stadium: Stadion Maksimir; Attendance: 12,000; Referee: Gerd Grabher (Austria)

===== 1998 FIFA World Cup qualification =====
====== Final round ======
6 July 1997 Second leg	Australia	2–0	New Zealand	Sydney, Australia
20:15 AEST	Zelic 6'; Arnold 54'	Report		Stadium: Sydney Football Stadium; Attendance: 14,045; Referee: Jamal Al Sharif (Syria)

====== Intercontinental play-off ======
22 November 1997 First leg	Iran	1–1	Australia	Tehran, Iran
21:10 IRST	Azizi 39'		Kewell 19'	Stadium: Azadi Stadium; Attendance: 128,000; Referee: Pierluigi Pairetto (Italy)

29 November 1997 Second leg	Australia	2–2	Iran	Melbourne, Australia
20:15 AEDT	Kewell 32'; A. Vidmar 48'		Bagheri 75'; Azizi 79'	Stadium: Melbourne Cricket Ground; Attendance: 85,022; Referee: Sándor Puhl (Hungary)

===== 1997 FIFA Confederations Cup =====
====== Group A ======
Pos	Team	Pld	W	D	L	GF	GA	GD	Pts	Qualification
1	Brazil	3	2	1	0	6	2	+4	7	Advanced to knockout stage
2	Australia	3	1	1	1	3	2	+1	4	Advanced to knockout stage
3	Mexico	3	1	0	2	8	6	+2	3	
4	Saudi Arabia	3	1	0	2	1	8	−7	3	

Source: RSSSF

12 December 1997	Mexico	1–3	Australia	Riyadh, Saudi Arabia
19:00 AST	Hernández 80' (pen.)	Report	Viduka 45'; Aloisi 59'; Mori 90'	Stadium: King Fahd II Stadium; Attendance: 15,000; Referee: Pirom Un-Prasert (Thailand)

14 December 1997	Australia	0–0	Brazil	Riyadh, Saudi Arabia
20:00 AST		Report		Stadium: King Fahd II Stadium; Attendance: 15,000; Referee: Lucien Bouchardeau (Niger)

16 December 1997	Saudi Arabia	1–0	Australia	Riyadh, Saudi Arabia
17:50 AST	Al-Khilaiwi 40'	Report		Stadium: King Fahd II Stadium; Attendance: 55,450; Referee: Javier Castrilli (Argentina)

====== Knockout stage ======
19 December 1997 Semi-finals	Uruguay	0–1 (a.e.t.)	Australia	Riyadh, Saudi Arabia
19:00 AST		Report	Kewell 92'	Stadium: King Fahd II Stadium; Attendance: 22,000; Referee: Nikolai Levnikov (Russia)

21 December 1997 Final	Brazil	6–0	Australia	Riyadh, Saudi Arabia
21:00 AST	Ronaldo 15', 27', 59'; Romário 38', 53', 75' (pen.)	Report		Stadium: King Fahd II Stadium; Attendance: 65,000; Referee: Pirom Un-Prasert (Thailand)

===== 1998 Optus World Series =====
7 February 1998	Australia	0–1	Chile	Melbourne, Australia
		Report	Acuna 19'	Stadium: Olympic Park; Attendance: 12,000; Referee: Gerry Connolly (Australia)

11 February 1998	Australia	1–0	South Korea	Sydney, Australia
	Tapai 39'	Report		Stadium: Sydney Football Stadium; Attendance: 9,823; Referee: Brett Hugo (Australia)

15 February 1998	Australia	0–3	Japan	Adelaide, Australia
		Report	Nakata 6' (pen.); Hirano 66', 70'	Stadium: Hindmarsh Stadium; Attendance: 9,541; Referee: Mark Shield (Australia)

=== Women's senior ===
==== Results and fixtures ====
===== Friendlies =====
6 August 1997	Australia	1–0	Sweden	Ostend, Belgium
	Murray 59'	Report

10 August 1997	Hungary	0–4	Australia	Csákvár, Hungary
		Report	Duus 10'; Moore 31'; Black 60', 84'

14 August 1997	Netherlands	1–1	Australia	Grootebroek, Netherlands
	Griffoien 20'	Report	Casagrande 55'	Stadium: Sport Park de Kloet

19 August 1997	Belgium	1–0	Australia	Brussels, Belgium
	Carnol 20'	Report		Stadium: King Baudouin Stadium

23 August 1997	Estonia	1–5	Australia	Tallinn, Estonia
	Morkovkina 2'	Report	Salisbury 20', 63'; Revell 31' (pen.); Taylor 61'; Murray 83'	Stadium: Haapsalu linnastaadion

26 August 1997	Finland	2–0	Australia	Helsinki, Finland
	Kalmari 69'; Uusmalmi 89'	Report

31 August 1997	Norway	7–1	Australia	Oslo, Norway
	Aarones 5'; Petterson 9', 34', 45', 81'; Haugenes 55', 90'	Report

16 November 1997	Australia	0–3	China	Lismore, Australia
		Report	Qingxia 9'; Qingmei 23'; Lihong 41'	Stadium: Oakes Oval

19 November 1997	Australia	2–0	New Zealand	Newcastle, Australia
	Revell 13' (pen.); Salisbury 75'	Report		Stadium: Topper Stadium

23 November 1997	Australia	2–1	China	Canberra, Australia
	Cooper 79'; Hughes 86'	Report	Lihong 83'	Stadium: Manuka Oval

=== Men's under-23 ===
==== Results and fixtures ====
===== Friendlies =====
12 July 1997	Australia	2–0	South Africa	Canberra, Australia
	Emerton 33'; Gonzales 57'	Report		Stadium: Bruce Stadium; Referee: Ben Williams (Australia)

19 July 1997	Australia	2–3	South Africa	Wollongong, Australia
	Salapasidis 34'; Allsopp 72'	Report	Salmon 10'; de Weber 22', 53'	Stadium: Brandon Park; Attendance: 4,058; Referee: Con Diomis (Australia)

21 March 1998	Australia	2–1	Brazil	Sydney, Australia
	Emerton 7'; Curcija 69'	Report	Elberto 31'	Stadium: Parramatta Stadium; Referee: Simon Micallef (Australia)

24 March 1998	Australia	3–2	Brazil	Adelaide, Australia
	Zane 42'; Curcija 59'; Rizzo 81' (pen.)	Report	Antônio 12', 83'	Stadium: Hindmarsh Stadium; Attendance: 7,537; Referee: Eugene Brazzale (Australia)

28 March 1998	Australia	2–1	Brazil	Perth, Australia
	Zane 15', 24'	Report	Edu 60'	Stadium: WACA Ground; Attendance: 13,357; Referee: Brett Hugo (Australia)

13 June 1998	Australia	1–0	New Zealand	Townsville, Australia
	Susa 3'	Report		Stadium: Dairy Farmers Stadium; Referee: Brett Hugo (Australia)

17 June 1998	Australia	2–0	New Zealand	Lismore, Australia
	Curcija 52'; Emerton 70'	Report		Stadium: Oakes Oval; Attendance: 2,800

20 June 1998	Australia	4–0	New Zealand	Coffs Harbour, Australia
	Emerton 19'; Carle 24'; Zane 75'; Kolpak 80'	Report		Stadium: Coffs Harbour International Stadium; Attendance: 4,400

=== Men's under-20 ===
==== Results and fixtures ====
===== Friendlies =====
3 June 1998	Chile	2–2	Australia	Santiago, Chile
	20', 54'	Report	Carle 27'; Care 42'	Attendance: 4,400

11 June 1998	Uruguay	0–1	Australia	Montevideo, Uruguay
		Report		Stadium: Nacional Universitario Field

14 June 1998	Uruguay	2–1	Australia	Montevideo, Uruguay
	Machado (?); Anchén (?)	Report		Stadium: Estadio Charrúa

=== Men's under-17 ===
==== Results and fixtures ====
===== Friendlies =====
3 June 1998	Australia	4–0	Japan	Adelaide, Australia
	Brain 53', 81'; DiIorio 84', 90'	Report		Stadium: Hindmarsh Stadium

== Domestic soccer ==
=== National Soccer League ===
South Melbourne won the championship in a 2–1 win against Carlton in the Grand Final.

Pos	Team	Pld	W	D	L	GF	GA	GD	Pts	Qualification
1	South Melbourne (C)	26	13	9	4	56	41	+15	48	Qualification for the Finals series
2	Carlton	26	12	9	5	44	24	+20	45	Qualification for the Finals series
3	Adelaide City	26	13	4	9	45	30	+15	43	Qualification for the Finals series
4	Sydney United	26	11	10	5	37	26	+11	43	Qualification for the Finals series
5	Marconi Fairfield	26	12	7	7	33	25	+8	43	Qualification for the Finals series
6	Wollongong Wolves	26	13	3	10	51	33	+18	42	Qualification for the Finals series
7	Melbourne Knights	26	11	6	9	37	35	+2	39	
8	Perth Glory	26	10	6	10	35	40	−5	36	
9	UTS Olympic	26	10	5	11	37	43	−6	35	
10	West Adelaide	26	10	4	12	32	38	−6	34	
11	Gippsland Falcons	26	8	7	11	28	36	−8	31	
12	Brisbane Strikers	26	6	5	15	23	40	−17	23	
13	Newcastle Breakers	26	4	9	13	30	50	−20	21	
14	Canberra Cosmos	26	3	8	15	29	56	−27	17	

Source: rsssf.com
Rules for classification: 1) points; 2) goal difference; 3) number of goals scored.
(C) Champions

==== Finals series ====
Elimination Finals
5	Marconi Fairfield	1	1	2
4	Sydney United	0	0	0
6	Wollongong Wolves	3	2	5
3	Adelaide City	0	2	2

Major/Minor semi-finals
2	Carlton	1	0	1
1	South Melbourne	2	1	3
5	Marconi Fairfield	2
6	Wollongong Wolves	1

Preliminary Final
10 May 1998
2	Carlton	1
5	Marconi Fairfield	0

Grand Final
16 May 1998
South Melbourne	2
Carlton	1

=== Women's National Soccer League ===
NSW Institute of Sport won the championship in 3–2 win against SA Sports Institute.

Pool A
Pos	Team	Pld	W	D	L	GF	GA	GD	Pts	Qualification or relegation
1	SA Sports Institute	9	6	0	3	19	15	+4	18	Qualification to Finals series
2	Victoria ITC	9	3	1	5	14	17	−3	10	Qualification to Finals series
3	Queensland Academy of Sport	9	3	0	6	12	17	−5	9	

Source: OzFootball
Rules for classification: 1) points; 2) goal difference; 3) number of goals scored.

Pool B
Pos	Team	Pld	W	D	L	GF	GA	GD	Pts	Qualification or relegation
1	NSW Institute of Sport (C)	9	6	2	1	26	13	+13	20	Qualification to Finals series
2	ACT Academy of Sport	9	4	2	3	13	14	−1	14	Qualification to Finals series
3	Northern NSW ITC	9	2	1	6	11	19	−8	7	

Source: OzFootball
Rules for classification: 1) points; 2) goal difference; 3) number of goals scored.
(C) Champions
