= 1998–99 Women's National Soccer League =

3rd season of the Women's National Soccer League

Women's National Soccer League
- Season: 1998–99
- Dates: 7 November 1998 – 28 February 1999
- Champions: SASI Buffalo Pirates; 1st title
- Premiers: Canberra Eclipse; 1st title
- Matches: 41
- Goals: 130 (3.17 per match)
- Biggest home win: QAS Sting 5–0 Northern NSW Horizon (13 February 1999); SASI Buffalo Pirates 5–0 Northern NSW Horizon (20 February 1999)
- Biggest away win: Northern NSW Horizon 0–9 Canberra Eclipse (6 February 1999)
- Highest scoring: Northern NSW Horizon 0–9 Canberra Eclipse (6 February 1999)

The 1998–99 Women's National Soccer League was the third season of the Women's National Soccer League. The season began on 7 November 1998, and concluded with the grand final on 28 February 1999. Previous club ITC Victoria did not compete.

NSWIS Sapphires were the defending champions, as SASI Buffalo Pirates won their first championship in a 2–0 win over Canberra Eclipse in the grand final.

== Teams ==
Locations of the 1998–99 Women's National Soccer League
- Canberra Eclipse
- Northern NSW Horizon
- NSWIS Sapphires
- QAS Sting
- SASI Buffalo Pirates

== Regular season ==
=== League table ===
Pos	Team	Pld	W	D	L	GF	GA	GD	Pts	Qualification or relegation
1	Canberra Eclipse	16	9	3	4	32	25	+7	30	Qualification for Grand final
2	SASI Buffalo Pirates (C)	16	8	4	4	29	11	+18	28	Qualification for Grand final
3	NSWIS Sapphires	16	7	6	3	24	13	+11	27	
4	QAS Sting	16	5	3	8	26	30	−4	18	
5	Northern NSW Horizon	16	2	2	12	16	48	−32	8	

Source: OzFootball
Rules for classification: 1) points; 2) goal difference; 3) number of goals scored.
(C) Champions

=== Results ===
Home \ Away	CAN	NOR	NSW	QAS	SAS	CAN	NOR	NSW	QAS	SAS
Canberra Eclipse		3–2	3–2	5–3	1–0		1–2	0–4	2–2	1–0
Northern NSW Horizon	0–9		2–5	4–0	0–1	1–1		1–1	1–3	0–5
NSWIS Sapphires	2–0	1–0		1–1	0–0	0–1	1–0		0–2	0–0
QAS Sting	0–1	5–0	1–2		2–0	1–2	5–2	1–1		0–4
SASI Buffalo Pirates	5–1	5–0	0–3	3–0		1–1	2–1	1–1	2–0	

Source: OzFootball
Legend: Blue = home team win; Yellow = draw; Red = away team win.

== Grand final ==
28 February 1999

SASI Buffalo Pirates	2–0	Canberra Eclipse
Black 13', 41'	Report

Ainslie Football Club, Canberra
Attendance: 852
Referee: Tammy Ogston

== Awards ==
Award	Winner	Club
Julie Dolan Medal	(Australia) Julie Murray	NSW Sapphires
Golden Boot	(Australia) Lisa Casagrande	Canberra Eclipse
Rising Star	(Australia) Michelle Carney	NSW Sapphires

Ref.
