= Julie Dolan Medal =

Annual top Australian women's football (soccer) award

The Julie Dolan Medal is awarded annually to the player voted to be the best player in the highest women's soccer league in Australia. The medal has been presented to players in the W-League (retitled A-League Women) and previously in the Women's National Soccer League (WNSL). The medal is named after former Matilda's Captain and soccer administrator Julie Dolan. The format was changed for the 2015–16 season, with a panel featuring former players, media, referees and technical staff, who voted on each regular-season match.

Since 2016 the award has been presented jointly with the Johnny Warren Medal at an event known as the Warren – Dolan Awards, where both A-League and W-League/A-League Women awards are presented.

== Winners ==
=== WNSL ===
Year	Winner	Club	Ref.
1996–97	unknown		
1997–98	Sharon Black	SA Sports Institute (SASI)	
1998–99	Julie Murray	NSWIS Sapphires	
1999	Ann Marie Vozzo	SASI Pirates	
2000	Taryn Rockall	NSW Sapphires	
2001–02	Joanne Peters	NSW Sapphires	
2002	Lisa De Vanna; Heather Garriock	Adelaide Sensation; Queensland Sting	
2003	N/A	N/A	
2004	Taryn Rockall	NSW Sapphires	

=== A-League Women ===
- The league was known as the "W-League", before being re-branded ahead of the 2021–22 season

Year	Winner	Club	Ref.(s)
2008–09	Lana Harch	Queensland Roar	
2009	Michelle Heyman	Central Coast Mariners	
2010–11	Kyah Simon	Sydney FC	
2011–12	Sally Shipard	Canberra United	
2012–13	Clare Polkinghorne	Brisbane Roar	
2013–14	Tameka Butt	Brisbane Roar	
2014	Emily van Egmond	Newcastle Jets	
2015–16	Ashleigh Sykes	Canberra United	
2016–17	Sam Kerr	Perth Glory	
2017–18	Sam Kerr; Clare Polkinghorne	Perth Glory; Brisbane Roar	
2018–19	Christine Nairn	Melbourne Victory	
2019–20	Kristen Hamilton	Western Sydney Wanderers	
2020–21	Michelle Heyman	Canberra United	
2021–22	Fiona Worts	Adelaide United	
2022–23	Alex Chidiac	Melbourne Victory	
2023–24	Sophie Harding	Western Sydney Wanderers	
2024–25	Alex Chidiac	Melbourne Victory	
2025–26	Isabel Gomez	Central Coast Mariners	

== Multiple winners ==
The following players have won the Julie Dolan Medal multiple times.

Medals	Player	Team(s)	Seasons
2	Taryn Rockall	NSW Sapphires	2000–01; 2004–05
2	Clare Polkinghorne	Brisbane Roar	2012–13; 2017–18
2	Sam Kerr	Perth Glory	2016–17; 2017–18
2	Michelle Heyman	Central Coast Mariners; Canberra United	2009; 2020–21
2	Alex Chidiac	Melbourne Victory	2022–23; 2024–25

== See also ==
- List of sports awards honoring women
- WNSL Individual honours
- W-League records and statistics
- W-League Golden Boot
- PFA Women's Footballer of the Year
