= 1997–98 Women's National Soccer League =

2nd season of the Women's National Soccer League

Women's National Soccer League
- Season: 1997–98
- Dates: 24 October 1997 – 1 March 1998
- Champions: NSW Institute of Sport; 1st title
- Goals: 111
- Highest scoring: NSW Institute of Sport 4–0 Queensland Academy of Sport (23 January 1998); Northern NSW ITC 0–4 NSW Institute of Sport (7 February 1998)
- Longest winning run: 6 matches NSW Institute of Sport
- Longest unbeaten run: 8 matches NSW Institute of Sport
- Longest winless run: 5 matches Victoria ITC
- Longest losing run: 4 matches Northern NSW ITC

The 1997–98 Women's National Soccer League was the second season of the Women's National Soccer League. The season began on 24 October 1997, and concluded with the grand final on 1 March 1998.

Queensland Academy of Sport were the defending champions, as NSW Institute of Sport won their first championship in a 3–2 win over SA Sports Institute in the grand final.

== Teams ==
Pool A	Pool B
Queensland Academy of Sport; SA Sports Institute; Victoria ITC	ACT Academy of Sport; NSW Institute of Sport; Northern NSW ITC

== Regular season ==
=== League tables ===
Pool A
Pos	Team	Pld	W	D	L	GF	GA	GD	Pts	Qualification or relegation
1	SA Sports Institute	9	6	0	3	19	15	+4	18	Qualification to Finals series
2	Victoria ITC	9	3	1	5	14	17	−3	10	Qualification to Finals series
3	Queensland Academy of Sport	9	3	0	6	12	17	−5	9	

Source: OzFootball
Rules for classification: 1) points; 2) goal difference; 3) number of goals scored.

Pool B
Pos	Team	Pld	W	D	L	GF	GA	GD	Pts	Qualification or relegation
1	NSW Institute of Sport (C)	9	6	2	1	26	13	+13	20	Qualification to Finals series
2	ACT Academy of Sport	9	4	2	3	13	14	−1	14	Qualification to Finals series
3	Northern NSW ITC	9	2	1	6	11	19	−8	7	

Source: OzFootball
Rules for classification: 1) points; 2) goal difference; 3) number of goals scored.
(C) Champions

=== Results ===
Home \ Away	ACT	NOR	NSW	QAS	SAS	VIC	ACT	NOR	NSW	QAS	SAS	VIC
ACT Academy of Sport		1–0	3–2	2–1	1–2	2–2		2–1	2–2			
Northern NSW ITC	1–0		0–4	1–2	2–4	2–1						
NSW Institute of Sport	3–0	2–2		4–0	4–3	2–1		3–2				
Queensland Academy of Sport					1–3	3–1					0–1	3–1
SA Sports Institute				2–1		2–0						1–2
Victoria Vision				2–1	4–1							

Source: OzFootball
Legend: Blue = home team win; Yellow = draw; Red = away team win.

== Finals series ==
=== Semi-finals ===
27 February 1998

ACT Academy of Sport	1–2 (a.e.t.)	Victoria ITC
Cooper 31'	Report	Bisby 74'; Cosic 101'

St George Stadium, Sydney
27 February 1998

NSW Institute of Sport	3–2	SA Sports Institute
Murray 10'; Boyd 69'; Smith 89'	Report	Black 39', 58'

St George Stadium, Sydney

=== Preliminary final ===
28 February 1998

SA Sports Institute	2–1	Victoria ITC
Moore 26'; Black 40'	Report	Digiammarco 66'

St George Stadium, Sydney

=== Grand final ===
1 March 1998

NSW Institute of Sport	3–2	SA Sports Institute
Murray 17', 45' 95'	Report	Black 16'; Morris 77'

St George Stadium, Sydney

== Awards ==
Award	Winner	Club
Julie Dolan Medal	(Australia) Sharon Black	SA Sports Institute
Golden Boot	(Australia) Sharon Black	SA Sports Institute

Ref.
