= 2003 Women's National Soccer League =

- League: Women's National Soccer League
- Sport: Women's soccer
- Duration: 17 October–20 December 2003
- Teams: 6

WNSL season and grand final
- Champions: NSW Sapphires
- Minor premiers: Queensland Sting
- Top scorer: Catherine Cannuli

Seasons
- 2002

The 2003 Women's National Soccer League, known as the Ansett Summer Series under a sponsorship arrangement with Ansett Australia, was the eighth season of the Women's National Soccer League (WNSL), the Australian national women's soccer competition. The season was played over 10 rounds followed by a grand final match between the top two teams. Queensland Sting finished first in the league however second-placed NSW Sapphires were crowned champions after winning the grand final.

== Clubs ==
Teams in the 2003 WNSL:

Team	City
Queensland Sting	Brisbane
NSW Sapphires	Sydney
Adelaide Sensation	Adelaide
Canberra Eclipse	Canberra
Victoria Vision	Melbourne
Northern NSW Pride	Newcastle

== Regular season ==
=== League table ===
Pos	Team	Pld	W	D	L	GF	GA	GD	Pts	Qualification
1	Queensland Sting	10	8	2	0	37	9	+28	26	Grand final
2	NSW Sapphires (C)	10	6	4	0	32	10	+22	22	Grand final
3	Adelaide Sensation	10	4	1	5	19	25	−6	13	
4	Canberra Eclipse	10	2	4	4	9	12	−3	10	
5	Victoria Vision	10	2	3	5	14	32	−18	9	
6	Northern NSW Pride	10	0	2	8	15	38	−23	2	

Source: OzFootball
(C) Champions

=== Home and away season ===
The 2003 WNSL season was played over 10 rounds, followed by a grand final between the top two teams in the league, starting in October and completing in December 2003. While all teams played each other twice, not all teams played each other home and away with several rounds hosted in a single location.

Home \ Away	Ade	CBR	NNSW	NSW	QLD	Vic
Adelaide Sensation	—	2–0	3–1†	1–2	1–4	0–1
Canberra Eclipse	2–0	—	2–0	3–0	0–1	0–0†
Northern NSW Pride	1–3†	1–2	—	0–9	3–4	5–5
NSW Sapphires	3–3	1–0	3–0	—	1–1†	6–1
Queensland Sting	8–2	2–0	5–1	0–0†	—	5–1
Victoria Vision	3–4	0–0	2–1	1–4	0–7†	—

Source: OzFootball

† Match hosted by "away" team.

== Grand final ==
Queensland Sting entered the grand final without losing a match in the league, only missing out on points in two draws against NSW Sapphires. The Sting were the reigning champions, having defeated the Sapphires in the 2002 Women's National Soccer League grand final. This was the fifth consecutive grand final for the Sapphires, who had lost the previous three championship deciders.

20 December 2003

Queensland Sting	1–3	NSW Sapphires
Belinda Dawney 90'	Report	Sally Shipard 39'; Michelle Carney 55'; Leah Blayney 85'

Lions Stadium

== Awards ==
- Golden Boot:
  - Catherine Cannuli, NSW Sapphires
