= Ann Marie Vozzo =

Australian former soccer player (born 1984)

Personal information
- Date of birth: 17 August 1984 (age 42)
- Place of birth: Adelaide, South Australia, Australia
- Position: Defender

Senior career*
Years	Team	Apps	(Gls)
1999–2002	Adelaide Sensation	19	(0)
Total		19	(0)
- * Club domestic league appearances and goals

Ann Marie Vozzo (born 17 August 1984) is an Australian former soccer player, who was a defender for SASI Pirates (renamed Adelaide Sensation) from 1999 to 2002 in the Women's National Soccer League. After her debut season in 1999, the 15-year-old was awarded both the Julie Dolan Medal for the league's best player and Young Player of the Year in January 2000.

== Early years and education ==
Vozzo was born on 17 August 1984 in Adelaide. She began playing soccer at the age of ten, as a junior at her Catholic primary school, Mater Christi (later part of Nazareth College) after encouragement from her older brother. She finished Year 12 at Loreto College, Marryatville in 2002 with merit awards for Business Studies and Physical Education.

== Soccer career ==
In 1997 Vozzo joined the senior team at Fulham United FC (women), which competed at state level in the Women's National Premier Leagues South Australia. She represented South Australia in their under-16 team for two years. Vazzo, as a member of South Australia's under-17 team won the national youth championship in July 2000 by defeating Northern NSW in the final. She was also selected for the All-Star Team as their sweeper.

Vozzo debuted for SASI Pirates in the Women's National Soccer League (WNSL) on 26 September 1999 in their 2–1 victory against Canberra Eclipse. She started in all 10 matches of the regular season as well as the grand final, which they lost 1–0 to NSW Sapphires on 20 November 1999. For her season's performances she was awarded WNSL's Young Player of the Year and the Julie Dolan Medal. The Australia women's national soccer team (Matildas) website reported that Vozzo had received a total of 28 points from nine of the league's ten rounds and displayed a "consistent flow of top performances" to win the accolade, which was presented by former Matildas' captain and the award's namesake, Julie Dolan.

As a member of an Australian All Stars Under-17 team, she competed at the 2000 US Youth Soccer Adidas Cup (Women U-18), held in Spring, Texas, from 29 May to 4 June 2000. The competition involved three US teams (USA U-17, USYSA U-17 Blue, USYSA U-17 White), and fellow visitors from China (All Stars Under-17) and Japan (All Stars Under-17). They lost all their matches and finished last. Later in the that year, SASI Pirates were renamed Adelaide Sensation in the WNSL and the regular season was reduced to five rounds with Vozzo making three appearances and her team did not reach the finals.

For the 2001-02 WNSL season Vozzo started in the first six rounds but did not appear in the last four rounds. Adelaide Sensation finished fourth and did not reach the finals. Latter rounds were missed due to the defender being named by coach Mike Mulvey for the Australia women's national under-20 soccer team (Young Matildas) training camp in January 2002 ahead of the 2002 OFC Women's Under 19 Qualifying Tournament, which was held in Tonga in April-May of that year. However, Vozzo withdrew from the camp due to injury, and was not in the 18-member squad, which travelled to Tonga.

== Honours ==
SASI Pirates/Adelaide Sensation

- WNSL: (silver) Runners-up: 1999

Individual

- WNSL Young Player of the Year: 1999
- WNSL Julie Dolan Medal: 1999
