= Heather Garriock =

Australian soccer player and coach (born 1982)

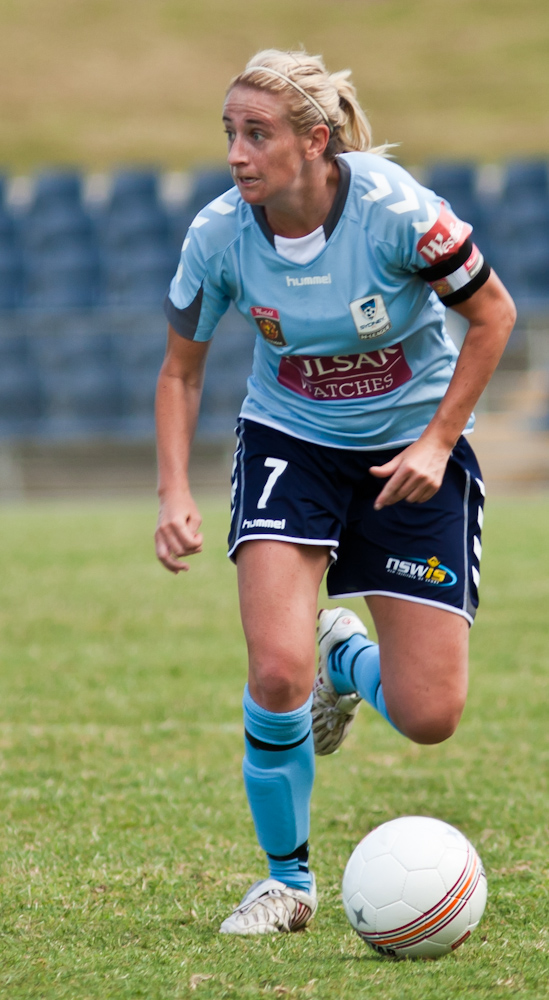
- Garriock playing for Sydney FC in 2010

Personal information
- Full name: Heather Ann Garriock
- Date of birth: 21 December 1982 (age 43)
- Place of birth: Sydney, Australia
- Height: 5 ft 5 in (1.65 m)
- Position: Midfielder

Youth career
- Leppington Lions Soccer Club

Senior career*
Years	Team	Apps	(Gls)
- Marconi Stallions
1996–2002	NSW Sapphires		
2002–2003	Queensland Sting		
2005–2006	NSW Sapphires		
2007	Adirondack Lynx	11	(10)
2007–2008	Fortuna Hjørring		
2008–2009	Sydney FC	4	(1)
2009	Chicago Red Stars	5	(0)
2009–2011	Sydney FC	19	(5)
2011	LdB FC Malmö	8	(0)
2011–2012	Sydney FC	6	(2)
2013	Marconi Stallions		
2013–2014	Western Sydney Wanderers	8	(2)

International career
1999–2011	Australia	130	(20)

Managerial career
- 2014–2017: Sydney Uni women
- 2017: Australia (Assistant)
- 2017–2020: Canberra United
- * Club domestic league appearances and goals

Heather Ann Garriock (born 21 December 1982) is an Australian former soccer player and coach. Garriock played as a midfielder in a career based mostly in Australia. Her last stint as a player was for Western Sydney Wanderers of the Australian W-League. Garriock played 130 matches for the Australian women's national team, appearing at two Olympic football tournaments and three FIFA Women's World Cups. Garriock currently work in executive-leadership-team position as Interim Chief Executive Officer for Football Australia.

== Playing career ==
=== Club career ===
Garriock began her career playing football in Australia. She played for Marconi Stallions, NSW Sapphires, and Queensland Sting before moving overseas.

She signed with Adirondack Lynx of Women's Premier Soccer League in 2006. She made six appearances in 2006 before returning to the Australian National Team. In 2007, she made a further five appearances. In total, she made 11 appearances for Adirondack Lynx, while scoring 10 goals and chipping in eight assists.

Garriock was on the move once again in 2008, playing for Fortuna Hjørring in Denmark, before moving back to Australia to play for Sydney FC in the Australian W-League.

In 2009, Garriock was selected for the Women's Professional Soccer league in the United States. In the 2008 WPS International Draft, she was picked 12th overall by Chicago Red Stars. For the inaugural 2009 Women's Professional Soccer season, she appeared for Chicago in 5 games (0 starts, 89 total minutes) and recorded an assist. It was announced on 30 September 2009 that Chicago had waived their option for a second year, thus making Garriock a free agent.

She returned to her previous team, Sydney FC, following her release from Chicago.

In October 2013, Garriock joined Western Sydney Wanderers.

Garriock retired from national league football after the 2013–14 W-League season.

=== International career ===
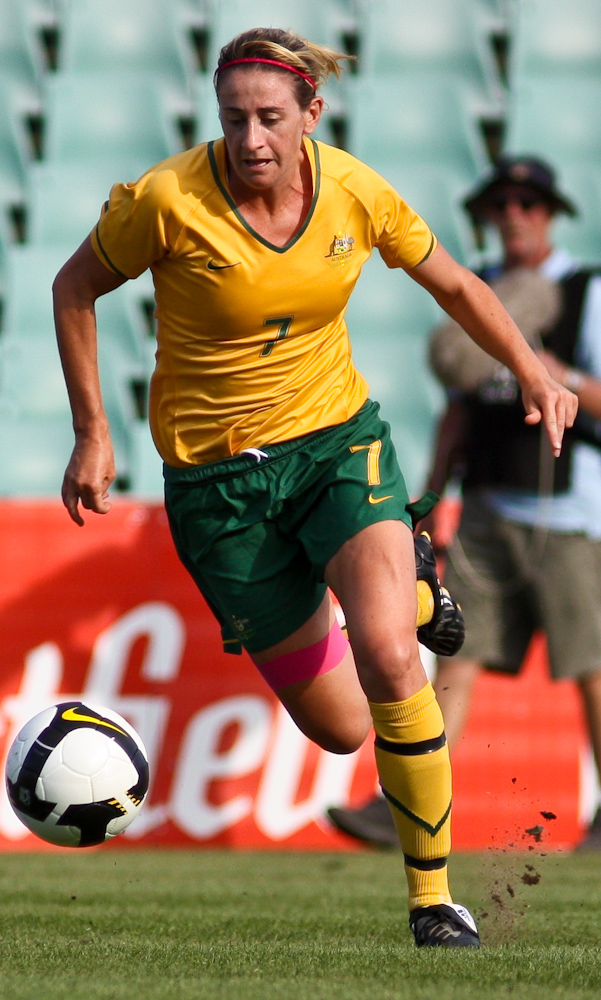
Garriock playing for Australia

Garriock first represented the Australia in October 1999 in a friendly against China at 16 years old. She has represented her country in the 2000 Summer Olympics in Sydney as well as the 2004 Summer Olympics in Athens.

She has also appeared for Australia in the 2003 and 2007 editions of the FIFA Women's World Cup. She scored two goals in 2003 and one in 2007.

== Coaching career ==
Garriock was appointed senior head coach of the Sydney Uni SFC women's first team in 2014.

In 2017, Garriock was appointed an assistant coach of Australia for the 2017 Algarve Cup.

On 22 May 2017, Garriock was appointed head coach of Canberra United. She was let go in February 2020.

== Personal life ==
Garriock was born in Campbelltown in the western suburbs of Sydney. She attended Westfields Sports High School.

Garriock and her long-term domestic partner (later husband), Mathieu Louchart's first child was born in late 2012. By the middle of the following year, the soccer player was in training to return to the national team. In October, Garriock was selected for the national squad, for an away friendly match in San Antonio, against the United States, although she did not play. After the tour, Football Federation Australia denied a claim from Garriock to cover her childcare expenses. A subsequent appeal to the New South Wales Civil and Administrative Tribunal was unsuccessful. Her ambition to compete for the Matildas, while caring for her child, was thwarted by lack of support. By July 2023 Garriock and Louchart were the parents of three children.

Garriock started the Macarthur Youth Football Academy in 2011, based in the southwestern Sydney area of Camden.

In June 2003, Garriock's younger brother, Nathan, died at age 17 from injuries sustained during an altercation at a party he attended in Camden.

== Career statistics ==
=== International goals ===
Scores and results list Australia's goal tally first.

#	Date	Venue	Opponent	Score	Result	Competition
1	2 June 2000	Sydney Football Stadium, Sydney, Australia	China	1–1	1–1	Friendly
2	19 January 2002	Tom Flood Sports Centre, Bendigo, Australia	South Korea	4–1	4–1	Friendly
3	5 April 2003	Belconnen Soccer Centre, Canberra, Australia	Samoa	15–0	19–0	2003 OFC Women's Championship
4	9 April 2003	Belconnen Soccer Centre, Canberra, Australia	Papua New Guinea	9–0	13–0	2003 OFC Women's Championship
5	9 April 2003	Belconnen Soccer Centre, Canberra, Australia	Papua New Guinea	11–0	13–0	2003 OFC Women's Championship
6	9 April 2003	Belconnen Soccer Centre, Canberra, Australia	Papua New Guinea	13–0	13–0	2003 OFC Women's Championship
7	25 September 2003	Home Depot Center, Los Angeles, United States	China	1–0	1–1	2003 FIFA Women's World Cup
8	28 September 2003	Providence Park, Portland, United States	Ghana	1–2	1–2	2003 FIFA Women's World Cup
9	14 August 2004	Pankritio Stadium, Heraklion, Greece	Greece	1–0	1–0	2004 Olympics
10	1 February 2005	Quanzhou Sports Center, Quanzhou, China	Russia	1–0	5–0	2005 Four Nations Tournament
11	23 February 2007	Zhongshan Soccer Stadium, Taipei, Taiwan	Uzbekistan	6–0	10–0	2008 Olympics qualifying
12	12 August 2007	BCU International Stadium	Chinese Taipei	3–0	7–0	2008 Olympics qualifying
13	19 August 2007	Tianjin Olympic Center Stadium, Tianjin, China	China	1–0	3–1	Friendly
14	12 September 2007	Yellow Dragon Sports Center, Hangzhou, China	Ghana	4–0	4–1	2007 FIFA Women's World Cup
15	29 May 2008	Thống Nhất Stadium, Ho Chi Minh City, Vietnam	Chinese Taipei	1–0	4–0	2008 AFC Women's Asian Cup
16	29 May 2008	Thống Nhất Stadium, Ho Chi Minh City, Vietnam	Chinese Taipei	2–0	4–0	2008 AFC Women's Asian Cup
17	15 June 2008	Suwon Sports Complex, Suwon, South Korea	United States	1–1	1–2	2008 Peace Queen Cup
18	17 June 2008	Suwon Sports Complex, Suwon, South Korea	Italy	1–0	3–0	2008 Peace Queen Cup
19	17 June 2008	Suwon Sports Complex, Suwon, South Korea	Italy	2–0	3–0	2008 Peace Queen Cup
20	20 February 2010	Bill McKinlay Park, Auckland, New Zealand	New Zealand	1–0	3–0	Friendly

== Honours ==
=== Playing ===
==== Club ====
NSW Sapphires

- Women's National Soccer League Championship: 1999–2000

Fortuna Hjørring

- Danish Women's Cup: 2007–08

Sydney FC

- W-League Premiership: 2009, 2010–11
- W-League Championship: 2009

LdB FC Malmö

- Damallsvenskan: 2011
- Svenska Supercupen: 2011

==== Country ====
Australia

- OFC Women's Championship: 2003
- AFC Women's Asian Cup: 2010

==== Individual ====
- Julie Dolan Medal: 2002–03

=== Coaching ===
Sydney Uni SFC

- NPL NSW Women's 1 Coach of the Year: 2014

== See also ==
- List of women's footballers with 100 or more international caps

Sporting positions
Preceded by Sarah Walsh	Western Sydney Wanderers captain 2013–2014	Succeeded by Caitlin Cooper
