= Australian Women's Soccer Association =

OFC
- Founded: 1974

Australian Women's Soccer Association between 1974 and 2004, was the governing body for women's soccer in Australia. In 2004 Australian Women's Soccer Association merged with Football Australia. In its history, it has run or organised the Women's National Soccer League, the Australia women's team and other league divisions.
