= Tammie Thornton =

Australian soccer player (born 1976)

Personal information
- Place of birth: Cairns
- Height: 1.65 m (5 ft 5 in)
- Position: Midfielder

Youth career
- Stratford Dolphins: 1990

College career
Years	Team	Apps	(Gls)
2000	University of Mobile	18	(15)
2001–2004	Barry University	61	(28)

Senior career*
Years	Team	Apps	(Gls)
1996	QAS		
2001	Springfield Sirens	0 - Injuried	
1990	Stratford Dolphins		
2005	Queens Park Rangers		
2005/06	Chelsea	11	(1)
TBC	The Gap Football Club		

International career
1996–1997	Matildas	19	(0)
1995	U21 Australian Team		
1994	U18 Australian Team		
- * Club domestic league appearances and goals

Tammie Thornton (born 5 January 1976) is an Australian former international footballer who represented Australia at Under-18, Under-21 and senior national team level. She made 19 appearances for the Australian women's national football team, the Matildas, between 1996 and 1997.

Born and raised in Cairns, Queensland, Thornton began her football career with Stratford Dolphins in 1990 before progressing through Queensland and Australian representative pathways. Her playing career included the Queensland Academy of Sport, university football in the United States and club football in England, including Chelsea Football Club.

Following her playing career, Thornton continued her involvement in football through coaching, education, athlete development and mentoring. From 2022 to 2024, she served as a player mentor with the Australian Junior Matildas program.

== Early life and junior career ==
Thornton began playing football at the age of 14 after a friend invited her to join a team that was short of players. She began her youth football career with Stratford Dolphins in Cairns, Queensland.

The following year, Thornton was selected for the Queensland Under-16 representative team, which won the Australian National Championships. She subsequently represented Queensland at youth and senior levels, including the Under-19 and Open women's teams, and later captained the Queensland Open side.

In 1992, Thornton was named in the Queensland Youth Squad, representing Far North Queensland that finished 3rd in the State Championships. By 1995, she had progressed to the Australian Under-19 national squad.

Thornton relocated from Cairns to Brisbane to join the Queensland Academy of Sport (QAS). She was a member of the Queensland side that won the inaugural Ansett Australia Summer Series, which was the inaugural season of Australia's Women's National Soccer League in 1996–97. Queensland Academy of Sport won the championship, defeating South Australia 2–1 in the Grand Final on 23 March 1997.

The following year, at the age of 15, Thornton was selected for the Queensland Under-16 representative team, which went on to win the Australian National Championships. She subsequently progressed through state and national representative football pathways, representing Queensland at Under-19 and Open levels. Thornton later captained the Queensland Open women's team.She later relocated to Brisbane.

Thornton joined the Queensland Academy of Sport ahead of the 1996–97 Women's National Soccer League season and made her debut in early 1997.

Thornton was on the squad for the Springfield Sirens in the 2001 USL W-League. but didn't play due to injury.

During the break in the university season, Thornton turned out for her hometown club Stratford Dolphins in Cairns.

== Club and collegiate career ==
Period	Team
1990 onwards	Stratford Dolphins, Cairns
1996–2000	Queensland Academy of Sport
TBC	The Gap Football Club
2000	University of Mobile, USA
2001–2003	Barry University, USA
2001	Springfield Sirens, USA
2002	Stratford Dolphins
2005	Queens Park Rangers, England
2005/06	Chelsea FC Women, England

In 2000, Thornton attended the University of Mobile women's soccer team, scoring 15 times from 18 games. before transferring to Barry University in Florida, where she competed in NCAA Div II American collegiate football Between 2001 and 2004.

She later played in England, including a season with Chelsea FC Women in 2005/06.

During her time at Chelsea, Thornton competed in English domestic football at a time when the women's game operated with significantly fewer financial resources and professional opportunities than today.

== Coaching, mentoring and athlete development ==
=== Junior Matildas player mentor (2022–2024) ===
Between 2022 and 2024, Thornton served as a player mentor with the Australian Junior Matildas (U17) national team, supporting the development of emerging female footballers within Australia's national youth pathways. During this period, she travelled internationally with the squad for the AFC U17 Women's Asian Cup qualification campaigns, including tournaments in Mongolia and Vietnam. These competitions formed part of Australia's qualification pathway for the FIFA U17 Women's World Cup. Drawing on her experience as a former international footballer, Thornton provided mentoring to young athletes navigating the demands of high-performance football and representative sport.

=== School and community sport ===
Thornton has continued her involvement in sport through her work as a secondary school Health and Physical Education teacher, football coach and athlete development practitioner at Smithfield State High School in Cairns.

Her work includes developing and coordinating athlete development programs, strengthening school and community sporting partnerships and supporting young athletes across multiple sporting disciplines.

Thornton advocates a multi-sport approach to athlete development, emphasising physical literacy, movement competency, strength and conditioning, injury prevention and long-term participation in sport.

She has also contributed to regional representative football programs and grassroots football development throughout Far North Queensland.

== Recognition and contribution ==
Thornton was a member of the Queensland Academy of Sport team that won the inaugural Australian women's national league championship.

Her contribution to the early development of women's football in Australia was documented by Professional Footballers Australia in its 2022 historical feature examining the origins of the national women's competition.

Football Queensland

== International career ==
In 1996, Thornton played her first match for the Australia women's national soccer team as a second half substitute against New Zealand in March 1996.

Thornton played the last of her 19 national team appearances in 1997.
