= Sharon Black =

Australian soccer player (born 1971)

Personal information
- Full name: Sharon Lee Black
- Date of birth: 4 April 1971 (age 55)
- Place of birth: Adelaide, Australia
- Height: 1.65 m (5 ft 5 in)
- Positions: Midfielder; forward

Senior career*
Years	Team	Apps	(Gls)
- Birkalla
1994–1997	Sturt Marion		
1996	SASI Pirates		
- Fortuna Hjørring
2008–2009	Adelaide United	9	(3)

International career^{‡}
1991–2002	Australia	61	(20)
- * Club domestic league appearances and goals as of 20:06, 12 January 2014 (UTC) ‡ National team caps and goals as of 20:06, 12 January 2014 (UTC)

Sharon Lee Black (born 4 April 1971) is an Australian former soccer player who played national league football in Australia and Denmark as well as representing Australia at the 2000 Olympic Football Tournament and the 1999 FIFA Women's World Cup. Her last club was Australian W-League team Adelaide United.

== Early years ==
Sharon Lee Black was born on 4 April 1971 in Adelaide. She began playing soccer at the age of 8 in a boys team. In 1990 she toured the United States and Britain as a member of the Australian Schoolgirls team under coach, Steve Gillespie.

== Club career ==
Black began her senior career with Birkalla. From 1994 to 1996 she was a player-coach for Sturt Marion, which competed in the State League South Australia division one. She joined the South Australian Sports Institute (SASI) club, later named Adelaide Sensation, in the Women's National Soccer League (WNSL) for their first season in 1996–97. Black provided eight goals across nine regular season appearances to help her team to the grand final, which they lost 2–1 against Queensland Academy of Sport (QAS), later named Queensland Sting. In the following season Black scored nine goals from nine appearances, getting SASI to the grand final, but despite her scoring the opening goal, they lost 3–2 to New South Wales Institute of Sport (NSWIS) later NSW Sapphires. Black was awarded the inaugural Julie Dolan Medal for player of the year for 1997–98. In the 1998–99 season South Australia (then-known as Southern Stars) finished second after the regular season and met Canberra Eclipse in the grand final. Black kicked the only two goals for the match and her team won the Championship 2–0.

Along with compatriot Alison Forman she appeared for Denmark's Fortuna Hjørring in the 2003 UEFA Women's Cup Final.

== International career ==
Black was selected by Australia's coach, John Reid for a three-game series against New Zealand in New Zealand during October 1991. After that tour the Australians played no matches during 1992 and 1993, she was recalled to the team's squad in February 1994. Black joined the SASI staff in 1995, which established an Intensive Training Centre (ITC) to assist local, aspirant national players.

Overall Black played 61 times and provided 20 goals between 1991 and 2002. She represented the Australian national team at the 1999 FIFA Women's World Cup in the United States and at the 2000 Olympic Football Tournament in Sydney.

== Honours ==
In 2013, Black was named in the Football Federation Australia (FFA) Women's Team of the Decade 1990–99. She was inducted into Football Australia Hall of Fame in 2025, alongside Socceroo, Tim Cahill.

== International goals ==
Scores and results list Australia's goal tally first.

No.	Date	Venue	Opponent	Score	Result	Competition	Ref.
1.	4 July 1996	Tampa Stadium; Tampa, Florida	United States	1–0	1–2	Friendly	
2.	10 August 1997	Csákvár, Hungary	Hungary	3–0	4–0	Friendly	
3.	10 August 1997	Csákvár, Hungary	Hungary	4–0	4–0	Friendly	
4.	9 October 1998	Auckland, New Zealand	American Samoa	6–0	21–0	1998 OFC Women's Championship	
5.	9 October 1998	Auckland, New Zealand	American Samoa	13–0	21–0	1998 OFC Women's Championship	
6.	9 October 1998	Auckland, New Zealand	American Samoa	18–0	21–0	1998 OFC Women's Championship	
7.	9 October 1998	Auckland, New Zealand	American Samoa	20–0	21–0	1998 OFC Women's Championship	
8.	11 October 1998	Auckland, New Zealand	Papua New Guinea	1–0	8–0	1998 OFC Women's Championship	
9.	11 October 1998	Auckland, New Zealand	Papua New Guinea	2–0	8–0	1998 OFC Women's Championship	
10.	11 October 1998	Auckland, New Zealand	Papua New Guinea	3–0	8–0	1998 OFC Women's Championship	
11.	15 October 1998	Auckland, New Zealand	Fiji	5–0	17–0	1998 OFC Women's Championship	
12.	15 October 1998	Auckland, New Zealand	Fiji	7–0	17–0	1998 OFC Women's Championship	
13.	15 October 1998	Auckland, New Zealand	Fiji	12–0	17–0	1998 OFC Women's Championship	
14.	9 June 1999	Centennial Park Stadium; Etobicoke, Canada	Canada	2–1	3–1	Friendly	
15.	9 June 1999	Centennial Park Stadium; Etobicoke, Canada	Canada	3–1	3–1	Friendly	
16.	7 June 2000	Newscastle, Australia	New Zealand	1–0	4–0	Friendly	
17.	7 June 2000	Newscastle, Australia	New Zealand	2–0	4–0	Friendly	
18.	7 June 2000	Newscastle, Australia	New Zealand	4–0	4–0	Friendly	
19.	19 January 2002	Bendigo, Australia	South Korea	3–1	4–1	2002 Australia Cup	
