= Dianne Alagich =

Australian soccer player (born 1979)

Dianne Alagić
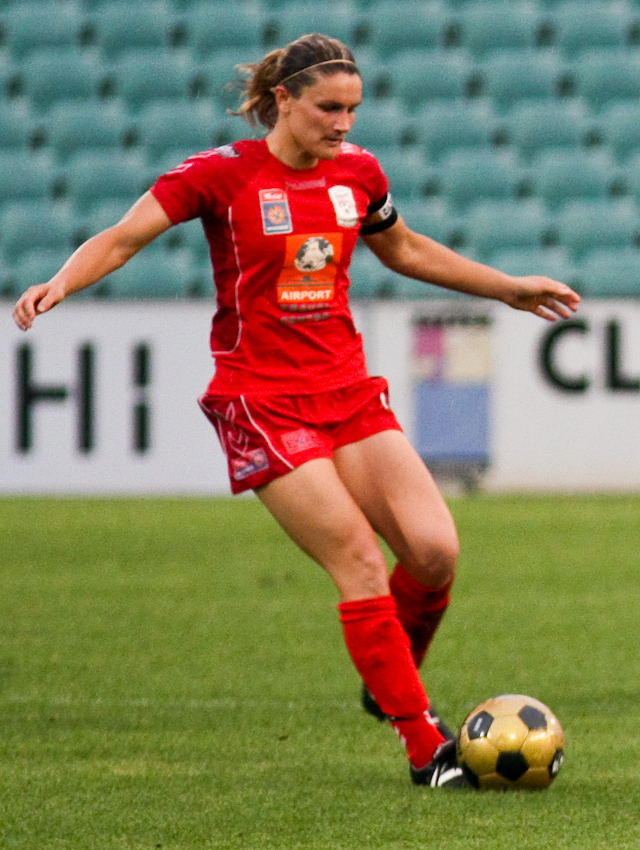
- Alagich playing for Adelaide United in 2008

Personal information
- Full name: Dianne Marie Alagich
- Date of birth: 12 May 1979 (age 47)
- Place of birth: Adelaide, Australia
- Height: 1.69 m (5 ft 7 in)
- Position: Defender

Senior career*
Years	Team	Apps	(Gls)
1997–2000	Adelaide Sensation		
2001–2003	San Jose CyberRays	35	(1)
2003–2004	Adelaide Sensation		
2006–2008	NSW Sapphires		
2008–2009	Adelaide United	10	(0)

International career^{‡}
1995–2008	Australia	86	(3)
- * Club domestic league appearances and goals ‡ National team caps and goals as of 6 January 2009

Dianne Marie Alagić (Croatian: [ǎlaɡitɕ]; born 12 May 1979) is an Australian former soccer player, who last played for Adelaide United in the W-League in 2009 and the Matildas in 2008. A defender, she was capped 86 times, scoring on three occasions. She is the younger sister of former Adelaide United player Richie Alagich. On 19 December 2000, she was awarded the Australian Sports Medal.

Alagich also excelled as a layaker, having been an Australian junior representative.
