= Leah Blayney =

Australian soccer player and coach

- Blayney in 2026

Personal information
- Full name: Leah Janine Blayney
- Date of birth: 4 July 1986 (age 40)
- Place of birth: Katoomba, New South Wales, Australia
- Height: 1.70 m (5 ft 7 in)
- Position: Midfielder

Youth career
- Wentworth Falls United

College career
Years	Team	Apps	(Gls)
2005	Auburn Tigers	19	(3)
2007–2009	Central Connecticut Blue Devils	61	(10)

Senior career*
Years	Team	Apps	(Gls)
- NSW Sapphires FC
2008	Sydney FC	2	(0)
2008–2009	SoccerPlus Connecticut		(11)
2010	Boston Aztec		(10)
2010–2012	Canberra United FC	4	(0)
2011	→ Boston Breakers (loan)	5	(0)
2012	Eskilstuna United DFF	5	(1)

International career
2004	Australia U19		
2006	Australia U20		
2003–2009	Australia	16	(0)

Managerial career
- 2016: Western Sydney Wanderers FC (women) (assistant)
- 2016–2019: Australia U20 (women) (assistant)
- 2019–2024: Australia U20 (women)
- 2025–2026: Japan (women) (assistant)
- 2026–: Calgary Wild FC (women)
- * Club domestic league appearances and goals

Leah Janine Blayney (born 4 July 1986) is an Australian soccer coach and former player, who currently serves as head coach of Northern Super League club Calgary Wild FC.

== Early life ==
Blayney played youth soccer with Wentworth Falls United.

== College career ==
In 2005, Blayney moved to the United States to attend Auburn University, where she played for the women's soccer team.

In 2007, she began attending Central Connecticut State University, joining their women's soccer team. In 2007, she was named to the All-Northeast Conference First Team and the All-New England First Team. In 2008, she was against named to the All-Northeast Conference First Team. In October 2009, she earned Northeast Conference Player of the Week honours. At the end of the 2009 season, where she finished as the leading scorer in the Northeast Conference, she was named the Northeast Conference Offensive Player of the Year, All-Northeast Conference First Team, and All-Northeast Region First Team.

== Club career ==
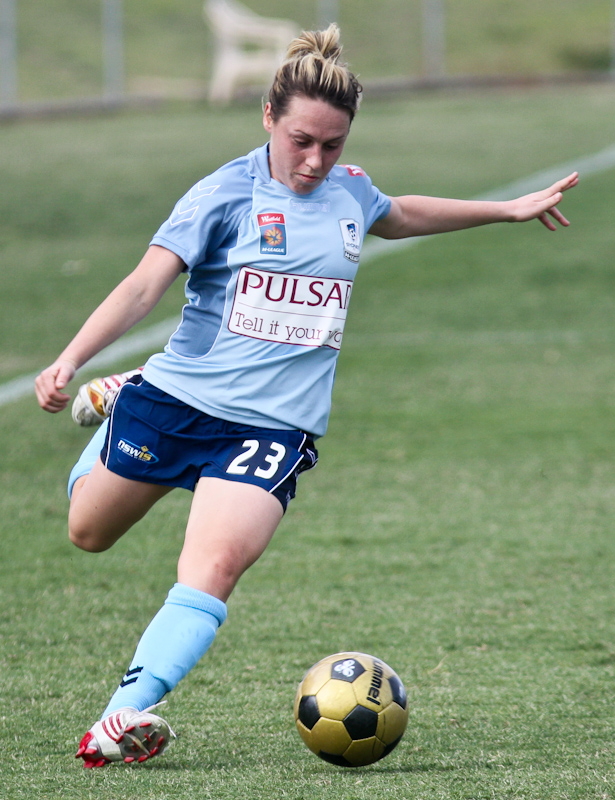
Blayney playing for Sydney FC in 2008

Blayney began her senior career with NSW Sapphires FC in the Australian Women's National Soccer League.

After moving to the United States to play at the college level, she briefly returned to Australia to play with Sydney FC in the Australian W-League

In 2008 and 2009, she played with SoccerPlus Connecticut in the Women's Premier Soccer League. In 2010, she played with the Boston Aztec, finished as the joint-leading goalscorer in the WPSL with 10 goals. She helped the Aztec win the 2010 title, earning Final Four- MVP honours and WPSL East Player of the Year.

In December 2010, she again returned to Australia to join Canberra United FC, having agreed to the contract in October. During the Australian off-season, she joined the Boston Breakers, suffering an injury causing her to miss the start of the next season with Canberra.

In December 2011, she agreed to a contract with Swedish club Eskilstuna United DFF in the second tier Division 1 Söderettan, joining the club in April 2012. After playing in the first five matches of the season, scoring one goal, she suffered an injury and agreed to a mutual termination of her contract in July, in order to return to Australia.

== International career ==
She played for Australia at the 2004 FIFA Under 19 Women's World Championship and 2006 FIFA Under 20 Women's World Championship.

== Coaching career ==
After retiring due to injury, Blayney took up coaching. She coached the New South Wales U15 at the 2014 Australian National Championships. She later became an assistant with the Western Sydney Wanderers in the W-League, while also coaching youth teams with the Macarthur Rams FC.

Beginning in 2016, she became an assistant coach with the Australia women's national under-20 soccer team, while spending some time as second assistant with the senior team, coaching Australia U23 at the 2018 AFF Women's Championship, and holding lead scout roles for Australia for both the 2016 Olympics and the 2019 FIFA Women’s World Cup. In July 2019, she was named the head coach of the Australia U20.

In January 2025, she became an assistant coach with the Japan national team. After winning the 2026 AFC Women's Asian Cup, she departed her role in April 2026.

In July 2026, Blayney was named the head coach of Canadian Northern Super League club Calgary Wild FC. She coached the Wild to their first win of the 2026 season on 8 August, a 3-2 victory over Vancouver Rise FC.
