= Women's soccer in Australia =

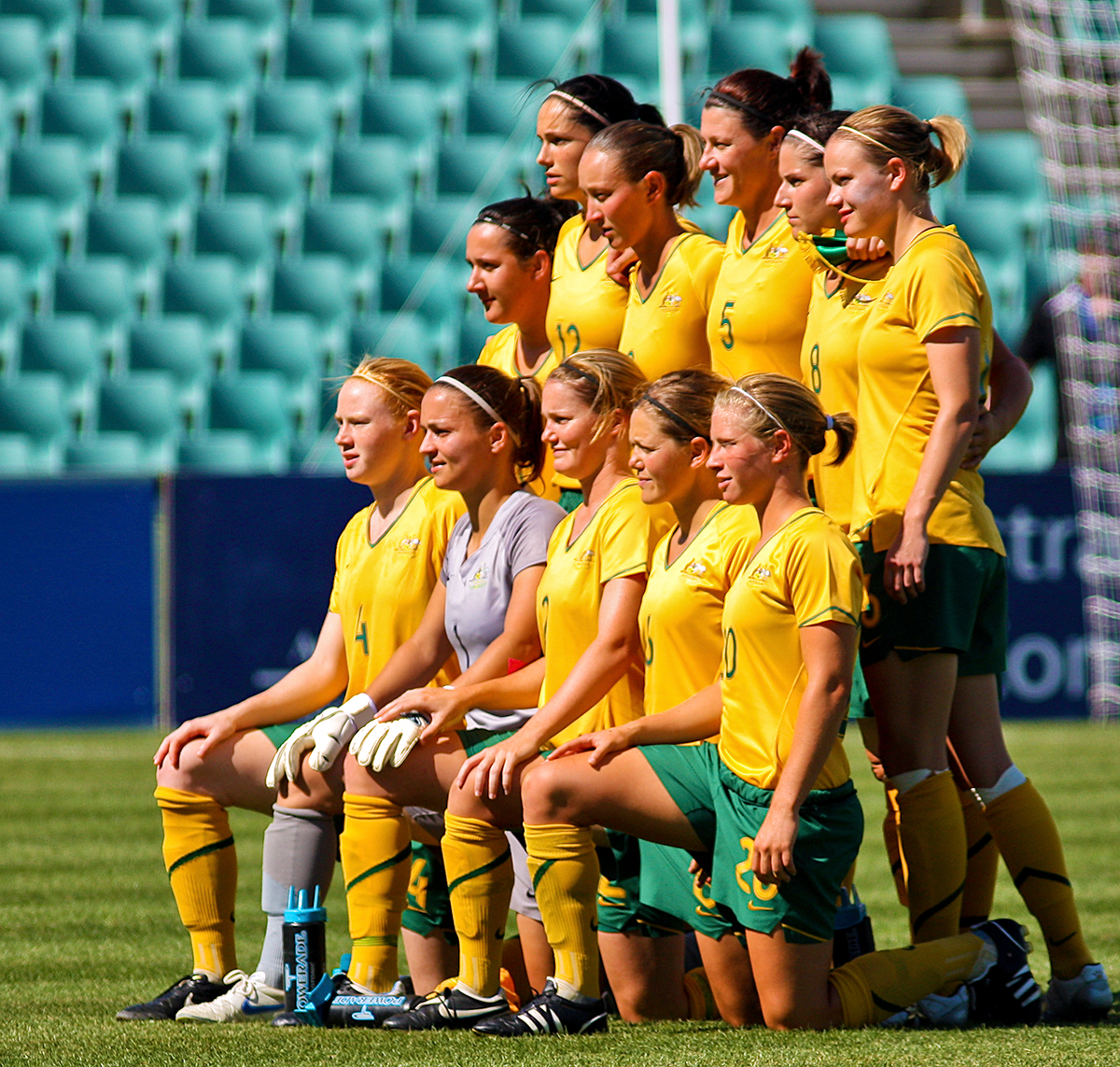
- The Australia women's national team before a friendly against Italy in Sydney.
- Country: Australia
- Governing body: Football Australia
- National team: Women's national team

Club competitions
- A-League Women

International competitions
- Olympics; FIFA Women's World Cup (national team); AFC Women's Asian Cup (national team)

Audience records
- Single match: 59,119

Women's soccer is a popular sport in Australia, with high levels of participation both recreationally and professionally. Football Australia is the national governing body of soccer in Australia, responsible for overseeing the Australian women's national team and the nine state football federations, among other duties. Women's participation in modern soccer in Australia has been recorded since the early 1920s, and it has grown to become one of the most popular team sports for women in the country. A-League Women is the top-tier women's soccer league in Australia.

== History ==
Some of the earliest games of soccer played in Australia were played in Brisbane in 1921. Around that period, there were at least three active teams, with over 60 combined total players. In September 1921, a game was played at the Brisbane Cricket Ground between a team from North Brisbane and a team from South Brisbane. The match had over 10,000 people in attendance. The North Brisbane team wore red and the South Brisbane team wore blue. The game was won by North Brisbane with a score of two to zero. Early football outfits for women were not that different from the outfits worn today: long socks, long-sleeved football jerseys, baggy shorts, and purpose worn football shoes. Originally, football was not played by girls at schools in Queensland. Instead, football was played by factory workers in Queensland.

In 1922, a committee in Australia investigated the benefits of physical education for girls. They came up with several recommendations regarding what sports were and were not appropriate for girls to play based on the level of fitness required. It was determined that for some individual girls that for medical reasons, the girls should probably not be allowed to participate in tennis, netball, lacrosse, golf, hockey, and cricket. Football was completely medically inappropriate for girls to play. It was medically appropriate for all girls to be able to participate in, so long as they were not done in an overly competitive manner, swimming, rowing, cycling and horseback riding.

Australian women's sports had an advantage over many other women's sport organisations around the world in the period after World War II. Women's sport organisations had largely remained intact and were holding competitions during the war period. This structure survived in the post war period. Women's sport were not hurt because of food rationing, petrol rationing, population disbursement, and other issues facing post-war Europe.

During the 1970s, 1980s and 1990s, women's soccer saw a large expansion in the number of competitors. In 1982, the first LGBTQI football team, the Adelaide Armpits, played their first season in Adelaide, and continued to play in South Australian competitions for 30 years.

Still, in 1993, the year the International Olympic Committee included women's soccer in the Olympic programme and chose Sydney to host the 2000 Summer Olympics, Australia did not have a female tournament. Afterwards the Australian Sports Commission started to give the annual $1 million funding to the Australian Women's Soccer Association, who launched the Women's National Soccer League, started to promote the national team, nicknamed "Matildas". The Australian Institute of Sport also started to offer female soccer scholarships. AWSA went defunct in 2001, being absorbed by Soccer Australia (later renamed Football Federation of Australia, and in 2020 Football Australia).

In April 2024, the 2023–24 A-League Women season set the record for the most attended season of any women's sport in Australian history, with the season recording a total attendance of 284,551 on 15 April 2024, and finishing with a final total attendance of 312,199.

== Participation ==
Girls play soccer at school. Most of these school-based players are not counted as registered soccer players.

== Competitions ==
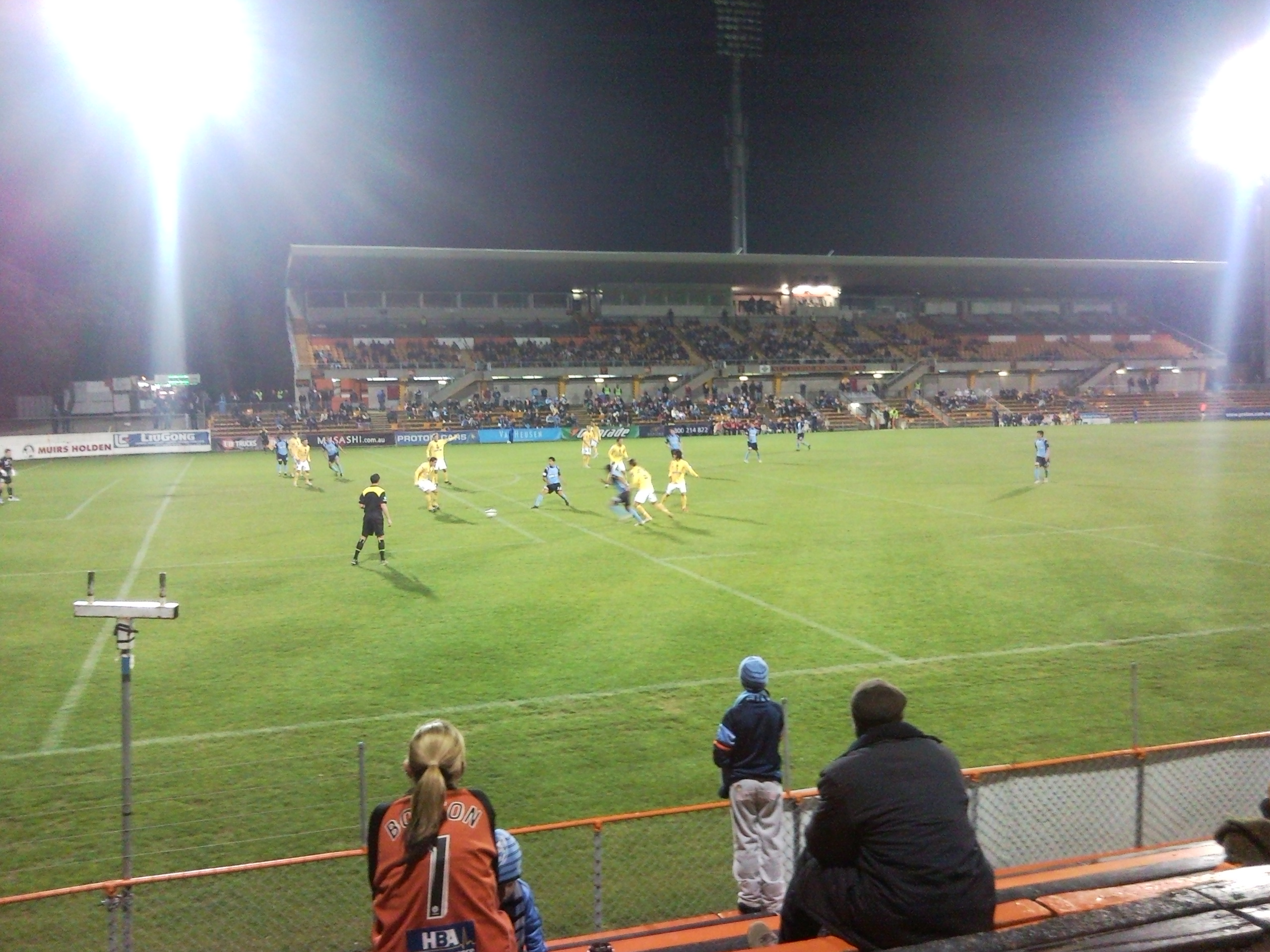
Sydney playing Central Coast Mariners in a 2007 pre-season friendly match

Since 2008, the A-League Women (renamed from the W-League) has been the highest women's football league in Australia. The A-League replaced the short dormant Women's National Soccer League, which from 1996 to 2004, was the national top tier league.

In the A-League's first year in competition, it managed to attract a number of international players including ones from Canada, New Zealand, Singapore and Sweden. Games had an average attendance of around 500 fans and games were televised nationally on free-to-air. The first season was won by the Queensland Roar. Sydney FC won the second season. In the league's third season, international players competed from countries including New Zealand, Taiwan, Denmark and Canada.

Many of the league's players are young, and the league is used by the FA as a way of developing young players for national team selection.

Some Australian players have played abroad, in national domestic seasons. These players include Sharon Black and Alison Forman who formerly played in Denmark; Stacey Stocco, Joanne Peters, Cheryl Salisbury, and Dianne Alagich, who formerly played in the United States; and Caitlin Foord, Samantha Kerr and Hayley Raso, all currently playing in the FA Women's Super League

== National teams ==
Girls can get anything they want out of soccer. It's a game that you can have individual as well as team achievements and it's a great environment. How many people can travel around the world and know people in so many countries?

— Cheryl Salisbury, Matilda Captain

"The Matildas" are Australia's women's national team. The team gives female athletes opportunities to play in high level competition. The national team first started representing the country during the 1970s. In 1978, the team competed in their first international tournament. This tournament was the World Women's Invitational in Taipai, Taiwan. Prior to 1978, Australia had only ever really competed against New Zealand on an international level.

In 1996, soccer made its debut as a women's sport at the Olympics. However, the IOC states otherwise, explicitly recognising the United States as the winner of the first gold medals in the women's sport in 1996. Four years later, Australia hosted the Olympics and Cheryl Salisbury scored the team's first Olympic goal in their second match against Sweden. Australia finished seventh in that first Olympic appearance. The team also competed in the 2004 Summer Olympics after qualifying by winning the Oceania qualifying tournament. Their next Olympic appearance did not come until the 2016 Games, in which they advanced to the quarter-finals and lost there on a penalty shootout to the host Brazil.

The first FIFA Women's World Cup was held in 1991. Australia did not qualify, having been beaten by New Zealand because of goal difference. In 1995, Australia did qualify and finished last in the tournament. In 1999, Australia finished eleventh out of sixteen. In 2003, Australia finished last in their group. The Matildas qualified for the first time as an AFC member in 2007, and had their best finish to date in the competition. They finished second to Norway in Group C and bowed out in the quarter-finals at the hands of Brazil. The Matildas matched that finish in 2011, finishing second to Brazil in Group D and losing in the quarter-finals to Sweden, and in 2015, finishing second to the United States in Group D and losing in the quarter-finals to Japan. The youngest player ever for the Matildas was 14. The 2023 Women's World Cup was hosted jointly by Australia and New Zealand. The Matildas made it to the semi-final, finishing 4th ahead of France (5th), but behind Spain (1st), England (2nd) and Sweden (3rd).

The Young Matildas are Australia's women's national under-20 team. The team was initially organised as a U-19 team, but became a U-20 team when FIFA changed the upper age limit for its top women's age-grade competition from 19 to 20 effective in 2006. They have competed in several tournaments including the 2002 FIFA U-19 Women's World Championship (predecessor to today's U-20 Women's World Cup). That particular competition was held in Canada. The Young Matildas finished fifth, the highest finish place in a FIFA sanctioned competition of any Australian women's national soccer team ever.

The Mini Matildas are Australia's women's national under-17 team. The team was established when FIFA announced that the U-17 Women's World Cup would be launched in 2008. Australia has yet to qualify for the World Cup at this age level.

The Deaf Matildas are Australian national deaf team. Their first major tournament was the Deaflympic Games held in Australia in 2005.

== Gender parity ==
The Matildas have been vocal about achieving equal status and pay for women footballers around the world, urging FIFA to act on the issue of gender parity in football. In 2019, the Matildas (then ranked 8th in the world) signed an agreement with the FFA (now Football Australia), which would guarantee equal pay and several other entitlements to Socceroos (ranked 44th). They would receive the same proportion of commercial income as the men, and be entitled to equal conditions such as business class air travel and the same training conditions. This made Australia the first country in which the men's and women's national teams have an equal share of the total revenue generated by both teams, with the two teams sharing 26% of the combined national income, apart from prize money.

As of 2023 three-quarters of players in Australia are male. The men's game gets priority for the best pitches, as well as referees, coaches, and other officials. Football Australia, with Sarah Walsh heading up their women's football division, aims to achieve gender parity by 2027, but there are obstacles and challenges to women entering the sport at grassroots level. There is a lack of women's change facilities and toilets at many venues. Most clubs in the men's A-League has a youth academy for boys, but only two in A-League Women have similar for girls. Women playing in the A-League earn a minimum wage and have to work at other jobs, often studying as well, while the top player in the men's A-League earns round A$2m.

In the 2023 FIFA Women's World Cup, the performance of the Matildas captivated nationwide attention and had a significant ongoing impact on the perception of women's sport in Australia. A video featuring 23 Matildas was released just before the tournament began, aiming to spread the message that women in other countries deserve parity in pay and conditions.

== See also ==
- Soccer in Australia
- Futsal in Australia
- Australian Women's Soccer Association

== Bibliography ==
- Evening Post (19 December 1922). "Women in Print". Evening Post. Vol. CC, no. 147. New Zealand: National Library of New Zealand. p. 7.
- Stell, Marion K. (1991). Half the Race, A history of Australian women in sport. North Ryde, Australia: HarperCollins. ISBN 0-207-16971-3.
- Stell, Marion (2004). Soccer. Girls in Sport. ABC Books. ISBN 0-7333-1426-0.
- Grainey, Timothy F. (2012). Beyond Bend It Like Beckham:of Women's Soccer. U of Nebraska Press. ISBN 978-0-8032-4036-0.
