= 1996–97 Women's National Soccer League =

First season of the Women's National Soccer League

Women's National Soccer League
- Season: 1996–97
- Dates: 6 December 1996 — 23 March 1997
- Matches: 28
- Goals: 99 (3.54 per match)

The 1996–97 Women's National Soccer League was the first season of the Women's National Soccer League, the former top Australian women's professional soccer league, since its establishment in 1996. Sponsored by Ansett Airlines, it was advertised as the 1996–97 Ansett Australia Summer Series and was the first organised Australia-wide female soccer competition.

== Teams ==
Six teams competed in the league split into a southern (Group 1) and northern (Group 2) conference. The teams were representative sides of their states elite sporting institutes. Rounds 1 to 6 had the three teams of the same conference playing each other, twice. Round 7 to 9 had each team from one conference playing a different team from the other conference.

=== Group 1 ===
- ACT Academy of Sport (ACTAS)
- South Australia Sports Institute (SASI)
- Victoria Intensive Training Centre (ITC Victoria)

=== Group 2 ===
- Northern NSW ITC (NNSW ITC)
- NSW Institute of Sport (NWSIS)
- Queensland Academy of Sport (QAS)

== League tables ==
Group 1
Pos	Team	Pld	W	D	L	GF	GA	GD	Pts	Qualification
1	SA Sports Institute	9	6	1	2	21	13	+8	19	Qualification to the Grand Final
2	ACT Academy of Sport	9	3	2	4	13	14	−1	11	
3	Victoria ITC	9	1	2	6	7	20	−13	5	

Source: OzFootball.net

Group 2
Pos	Team	Pld	W	D	L	GF	GA	GD	Pts	Qualification
1	Queensland Academy of Sport	9	4	2	3	18	15	+3	14	Qualification to the Grand Final
2	NSW Institute of Sport	9	4	2	3	18	15	+3	14	
3	Northern NSW ITC	9	4	1	4	19	19	0	13	

Source: OzFootball.net

== Results ==
Home \ Away	ACT	NOR	NSW	QLD	SAS	VIC	ACT	NOR	NSW	QLD	SAS	VIC
ACT Academy of Sport		2–3	3–2	2–2	1–2	1–3						
Northern NSW ITC			1–3	2–3	2–4	1–0			3–1	3–2		
NSW Institute of Sport		3–2		2–1	3–1	5–0				1–1		
Queensland Academy of Sport		3–2	3–0		2–3	1–0						
SA Sports Institute	1–0					6–1	0–2					2–0
Victoria ITC	0–1				2–2		1–1					

Source: OzFootball.net
Legend: Blue = home team win; Yellow = draw; Red = away team win.

=== Fifth place play-off ===
23 March 1997	Northern NSW ITC	1–0	Victoria ITC

=== Third place play-off ===
23 March 1997	ACT Academy of Sport	1–2	NSW Institute of Sport

=== Grand Final ===
23 March 1997	Queensland Academy of Sport	2–1	SA Sports Institute	Canberra
	Dunne 23', 82'		Moore 14'	Stadium: AIS Fields

== Season statistics ==
=== Scoring ===
==== Top scorers ====
Rank	Player	Club	Goals
1	(England) Kristy Moore	SA Sports Institute	9
2	(Australia) Sharon Black	SA Sports Institute	8
3	(Australia) Lisa Dunne	Queensland Academy of Sport	7
4	(Australia) Kim Revell	Queensland Academy of Sport	6
5	(Australia) Julie Murray	NSW Institute of Sport	5
5	(Australia) Traci Bartlett	ACT Academy of Sport	5

==== Hat-tricks ====
Player	For	Against	Result	Date
(Australia) Sharon Black	SA Sports Institute	Victoria ITC	6–1 (H)	7 December 1996
(Australia) Lisa Dunne	Queensland Academy of Sport	Northern NSW ITC	3–2 (A)	14 December 1996
