= Sacha Wainwright =

Australian soccer player

Personal information
- Date of birth: 6 February 1972 (age 54)
- Place of birth: Australia
- Position: Defender

Senior career*
| Years | Team | Apps | (Gls) |
| 2004 | Canberra Eclipse | | |

International career
| 1994–2004 | Australia | 61 (?) | (2) |
- * Club domestic league appearances and goals

Sacha Wainwright (born 6 February 1972) is an Australian retired soccer defender who played for the Australia women's national soccer team at the 2004 Summer Olympics. At the club level, she played for Canberra Eclipse.

== See also ==
- Australia at the 2004 Summer Olympics
