= Julie Dolan =

Australian soccer player

Julie Dolan AM
Personal information
- Full name: Julie Anne Dolan
- Date of birth: 5 January 1961 (age 65)
- Place of birth: Australia

International career^{‡}
Years	Team	Apps	(Gls)
1975–1988	Australia	18	(4)
- ‡ National team caps and goals as of 3 July 2011

Julie Anne Dolan AM is a pioneering Australian women's soccer player who appeared in eighteen international matches for the Australian Women's National Team during a 10-year career. She debuted in a national representative side aged just fourteen and was the first captain of the Australian Team.

== Career ==
Julie Anne Dolan was raised in Sydney's Sutherland Shire and started playing football at an elite level aged 14. She played for the Sydney clubs of St George Budapest, Marconi Stallions, Gymea Bay, Ballina, Sutherland, Grange Thistle and Arncliffe Scots. She participated in the Australian team that contested the first Asian Cup in 1975 and the inaugural Women's World Invitational in Chinese Taipei in 1978.

Between 1979 and 1988 Dolan played in eighteen full internationals. She was Australian captain on six occasions and made a total of thirty-four appearances for the Matildas.

She played in the World Invitational Tournament in Oceania in 1983. In the approach to the 1986 OFC Women's Nations Cup, Dolan and four fellow New South Wales-based players withdrew from the national team as "[they] cannot afford the trip" to compete in New Zealand in late March. She joined the squad for the pilot Women's World Cup in China in 1988. She played in the Australian team that defeated Brazil 1–0 in their first encounter in 1988.

== Accolades ==
In 1988, the Australian Women's Soccer Association created the Julie Dolan Medal in her honour, which is awarded to the Player of the Year in the Women's National Soccer League, and subsequently in the W-League (later renamed A-League Women). She was inducted into the Football Federation Australia Hall of Fame in 1999 and received the Queen Elizabeth II Australian Sports Medal in 2000.

In 2013, Dolan was named in Football Federation Australia's 1979–89 Team of the Decade as the team's captain. She also had the honour of being presented with Cap Number 1 for the Westfield Matildas, in recognition of being the first captain in the team's first A-International. Dolan was named International Federation of Football History and Statistics Oceania Player of the Century.

In 2016, football became the first major Australian sport to jointly name its prestigious awards event in honour of both a legendary female and male player – the Dolan Warren Awards – with Dolan honoured alongside national men's icon Johnny Warren. In June 2018 she was inducted into the Member of the Order of Australia (AM) for "significant service to football as an administrator, player and coach, and as an ambassador for elite player development and junior participation."

== Personal ==
Dolan resides on the Central Coast of New South Wales. She is currently Football Technical Director at the International Football School.
