= Alen Stajcic =

Australian soccer coach (born 1973)

Alen Stajcic OAM
- Stajcic with Australia Women in 2017

Personal information
- Full name: Alen Stajcic
- Date of birth: 2 November 1973 (age 53)
- Place of birth: Australia
- Position: Midfielder

Team information
- Current team: Indonesia Women (head coach)

Senior career*
Years	Team	Apps	(Gls)
1994	Mount Druitt Town	6	(0)
1994–1997	Bonnyrigg White Eagles	35	(2)
1998	Bankstown City Lions	13	(2)
2000	Western Sydney Passion		
2000–2002	Sutherland Sharks	38	(2)

Managerial career
- 2002–2004: New South Wales Sapphires
- 2008–2014: Sydney FC Women
- 2014–2019: Australia Women
- 2019: Central Coast Mariners (caretaker)
- 2019–2021: Central Coast Mariners
- 2021–2023: Philippines Women
- 2023–2024: Perth Glory
- 2024–2026: Western Sydney Wanderers
- 2026: Philippines Women U17
- 2026–: Indonesia Women
- * Club domestic league appearances and goals as of 11 August 2007

Alen Stajcic (Serbian Cyrillic: Ален Стајчић, pronounced [ǎlen stǎjt͡ʃit͡ɕ]; born 2 November 1973) is an Australian football manager and former player. He is the current head coach of the Indonesia women’s national team.

Stajcic was a NSW Premier League player and an Australian Youth Representative.

Since turning his hand to coaching he had become the head coach of the NSWIS women's team, head coach of the Hills Sports High School Football Program and the head coach of the Australia women's national under-20 team. He was appointed coach for Sydney FC in the first season of the Australian W-League. From 2014 to 2019, he was the head coach of the Matildas.

Stajcic was the head coach of the Philippine women's national team from 2021 to 2023, helping them qualify for the 2023 FIFA Women's World Cup, which was the country's first ever appearance in a World Cup, after leading the team to the semifinals of the 2022 AFC Women's Asian Cup.

== Club career ==
A former NSW Premier League player and captain with Bonnyrigg, Bankstown and Sutherland, Alen represented New South Wales at the youth level and played for several clubs within the National Youth League and Winter Super League.

== Managerial career ==
Stajcic had been the head coach of the NSWIS Women's Football Program from 2002 to 2013. Widely considered as one of the best football nurseries in Australia, the program produced over 30 senior Internationals in that 10-year period. He was also the head coach of the Women's National Soccer League side, the NSW Sapphires, which he guided to a premiership in the 2003/04 season. He started as head coach of HSHS in the foundation year (2003) and has gone on to win many titles and good performances.

In 2006, he was the assistant coach for the Young Matildas while they were competing at the 2006 FIFA U-20 Women's World Championship in Russia. Unfortunately they bowed out in the group stage, missing the next round by 1 point to Brazil and Russia. As of 05/03/07 Stajcic became the Young Matildas Coach.

In 2008, Stajcic became the inaugural Sydney FC Women's head coach, until 2014. They qualified for the semi-finals in all 6 seasons, winning 2 grand finals and 2 premierships along the way. In 2013, Sydney FC beat Japanese powerhouse NTV Beleza and Sth American Champions Colo Colo to claim 3rd place the IWCC in Japan.

=== Australia women ===
As of September 2014, Stajcic was appointed full-time head coach of the Australian women's national football team, the Matildas. In the 2015 Women's World Cup in Canada, they became the first senior Australian National Football Team to win a knockout match in a World Cup when they defeated Brazil 1–0 in the Round of 16 before losing 1–0 to Japan in the quarter-finals. Earlier in 2014, Stajcic had led the Matildas in an Interim capacity, to a silver medal at the Asian Championships.

In March 2016, the Matildas qualified for the Olympic Games for the first time in 12 years, eliminating World Cup finalists Japan in the process. The Matildas topped the Asian Qualifying group and were undefeated in the tournament. The Matildas subsequently attained their highest-ever FIFA Ranking of 5. At the 2016 Rio Olympics Australia were grouped with Canada, Germany and Zimbabwe. Australia progressed through to the quarter-finals, where they were beaten 7–6 on penalties by hosts Brazil after a 0–0 draw.

Despite qualifying for the 2019 Women's World Cup, Stajcic was sacked from his position by Football Federation Australia for reasons that were not made clear by the FFA at the time of the sacking, with FFA board member Heather Reid making cryptic remarks about how people "would be shocked" if they knew the reasons, with leaks to the media resulting in Lucy Zelić claiming the facts were legally confidential. Australian player Sam Kerr posted on Twitter saying "My trust was in Staj to lead us to the World Cup final & I believe he was the best coach for that". Stajcic took legal action against the FFA for the sacking and the veil of secrecy behind it, and in May 2019 this legal action lead to a settlement with a 'six figure' settlement accounting for the loss of potential World Cup bonuses and reputation damage. Heather Reid said in a statement following the settlement, "I apologise unreservedly for the damage, distress and hurt that I have caused to Alen Stajcic as a professional football coach".

=== Central Coast Mariners ===
Following the sacking of Mike Mulvey from Central Coast Mariners, on 12 March 2019 Stajcic was appointed as the caretaker head coach for the club. On 2 May 2019, Stajcic was appointed head coach on a 3-year contract until the end of the 2021–22 A-League season. In the final 6 games of season he was in charge for 2 wins and 4 losses.

The 2019/20 season was his first as the full time head coach, and the Mariners finished in last place with 5 wins, 3 draws and 18 losses from 26 games.

The early stages of the 2020/21 season went very well for the Mariners, and they won 5 of the first 7 matches, putting them in outright first place with 15 points. After initially leading the league at the season's halfway point, the Mariners ended up finishing the regular season in third place, the club's highest league finish since 2014, with the club achieving a record of 12 wins, 6 draws and 8 losses. The Mariners' season ended with a 2-0 elimination final loss to Macarthur FC.

On 17 June 2021, Stajcic confirmed his departure from the Mariners.

=== Philippine women ===
In late October 2021, Stajcic was appointed as head coach of the Filipinas, the Philippine women's national football team, ahead of the 2022 AFC Women's Asian Cup. By reaching the semifinals, following a penalty shootout win over Chinese Taipei, the Philippines qualified for the 2023 FIFA Women's World Cup, the first time the side had ever qualified. Stajcic became the only Australian-born coach to qualify for 3 FIFA World Cups. In March 2022, Stajcic would renew his contract with the Philippines which is set to last until the World Cup despite offers from Australia and Europe. In his guidance, he helped the team winning the 2022 AFF Women's Championship, the country's first regional trophy by blanking Thailand in the final 3–0.

Stajcic and his assistant Nahuel Arrarte were also appointed in January 2023 to oversee the under-17 and under-20 women's national teams.

At the FIFA Women's World Cup, the Philippines under Stajcic did not advance out of the group stage. Despite this however their run was considered as a success by the federation with the Philippines securing at least a win against co-host New Zealand in their debut. Stajcic and Arrarte's contract expired by the end of the tournament and did not renew.

=== Perth Glory ===
In August 2023, in the days following Philippines' exit from the Women's World Cup, Stajcic was announced as manager for Perth Glory marking his return to the A-League.

Stajcic departed the club on 25 June 2024.

=== Western Sydney Wanderers ===
In the hours after the announcement from previous club Perth Glory, the Wanderers announced Stajcic's appointment as head coach. During his first season, he guided the club to a 4th-placed finish in the regular season, with the club securing finals football before being eliminated in the Elimination finals playoff against Melbourne Victory. Stajic was sacked on 21 January 2026 due to the team's decline in form and sitting last at the halfway point of the season.

=== Philippines Women U17 ===
On 29 September 2026, Stajcic was announced as the head coach of the Philippines women's national under-17 team ahead of the 2027 AFC U-17 Women's Asian Cup qualifiers.

=== Indonesia Women ===
On 9 November 2026, Stajcic was formally introduced by Football Association of Indonesia (PSSI) as the new head coach of Indonesia women's national team with a three-year contract.

== Personal life ==
Stajcic and his wife have two children. As of April 2025, their daughter Anika is a professional footballer playing for Western Sydney Wanderers in the A-League Women competition, and has represented Australia at youth level.

== Managerial statistics ==
As of 3 January 2026

Team	Nat	From	To	Record				
Team	Nat	From	To	G	W	D	L	Win %
Sydney FC Women	(Australia)	October 2008	December 2014	87	48	13	26	55.17
Australia Women	(Australia)	September 2014	January 2019	64	36	15	13	56.25
Central Coast Mariners	(Australia)	March 2019	June 2021	63	22	9	32	34.92
Philippines Women	(Philippines)	October 2021	July 2023	42	24	3	15	57.14
Perth Glory	(Australia)	August 2023	July 2024	27	5	7	15	18.52
Western Sydney Wanderers	(Australia)	June 2024	January 2026	43	18	10	15	41.86
Total				312	149	51	112	47.76

== Honours ==
- W-league Coach of the Year: 2010–11
- W-league Coach of the Year: 2013–14
- Inducted into Sydney FC Hall of Fame: 2015
- Australian Institute of Sport Coach of the Year: 2017
- Philippines Sports- Coach of the Year 2023/ Inquirer Sports
- 2026 Australia Day Honours: Medal of the Order of Australia for service to football as a coach

=== As a player ===
- Australian Schoolboy International: 1992

=== As a coach ===
Philippines Women's National Team

- AFF Women's Championship: 2022
- Bronze medalists, Southeast Asian Games: 2021
- Semi-finalists, Asian Cup: 2022
- Qualified for World Cup: 2023 (debut)
- 1st ever World Cup Win vs New Zealand WWC '23
- Highest ever FIFA Ranking 46, May 2023

Central Coast Mariners A-league Team

- FFA Cup Semi-Finalists: 2019/20
- A-league Finalists 2020/21

Australian Women's National Team

- Runners-up, Asian Cup: 2014, 2018
- Quarter Finalist, World Cup: 2015
- Quarter Finalist, Olympics: 2016
- Tournament of Nations Winners: 2017
- Record high FIFA World Ranking of 4: 2017

Sydney FC Women's Team

- Premiers: 2009, 2010–11
- Champions: 2009, 2012–13
- 3rd Place International Women's Club Championship: 2013
- Semi Finalist 2008, 2011–12, 2013/14
- Finalist 2010–11

NSW Sapphires

- Winner of Nation Women's Soccer League: 2003–04
- Runners-up of Nation Women's Soccer League: 2002–03
