= Catherine Cannuli =

Australian soccer coach and player

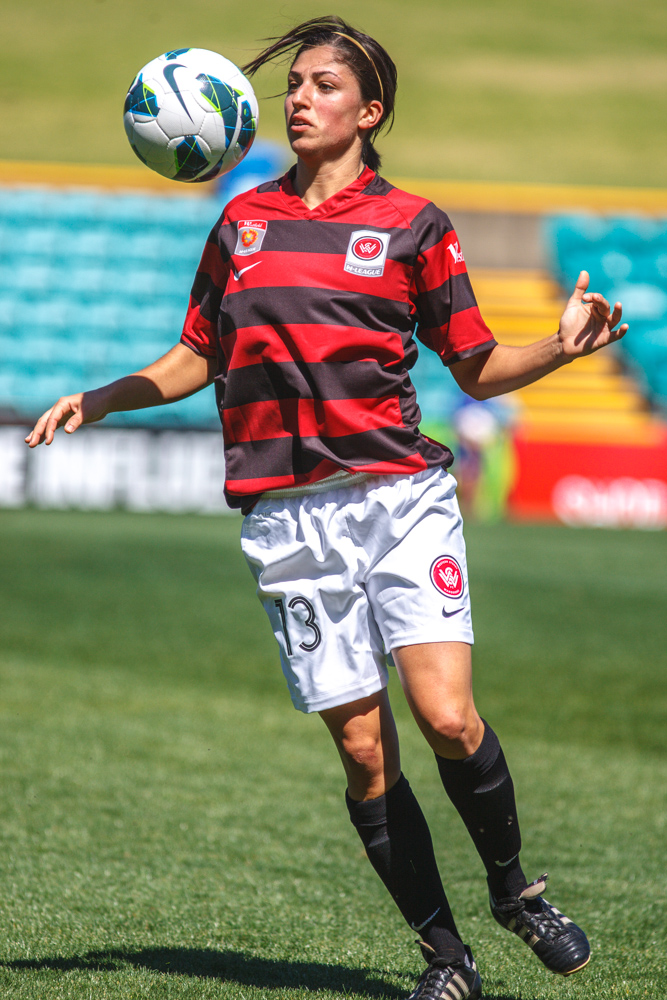
- Cannuli playing for the Western Sydney Wanderers in 2012

Personal information
- Full name: Catherine Cannuli
- Date of birth: 3 March 1986 (age 40)
- Place of birth: Sydney, Australia
- Height: 1.63 m (5 ft 4 in)
- Position: Striker

Team information
- Current team: Western Sydney Wanderers (coach)

Youth career
- Marconi Stallions

Senior career*
Years	Team	Apps	(Gls)
2000–2004	NSW Sapphires		
2009–2011	Sydney FC	22	(3)
2011–2012	Brisbane Roar	11	(0)
2012–2014	Western Sydney Wanderers	22	(7)
2016–2017	SD Raiders		
Total		55	(10)

International career
2002–2004	Australia U-19		
2011–2012	Australia	4	(1)

Managerial career
- 2016–2017: SD Raiders
- 2017–2021: Western Sydney Wanderers (assistant coach)
- 2021–2022: Western Sydney Wanderers
- 2021-: SD Raiders (technical director)
- * Club domestic league appearances and goals

Catherine Cannuli (born 3 March 1986) is an Australian soccer coach, broadcast pundit and former professional player who is the football technical director of the Southern Districts Raiders FC in the New South Wales Women's National Premier Leagues. She played national league football in the Women's National Soccer League for the NSW Sapphires and the W-League for Sydney FC, Brisbane Roar and Western Sydney Wanderers, along with the Inter Lions in the NSW Women's Premier League. She earned four international caps for Australia.

== Playing career ==
=== Club career ===
Cannuli began playing soccer at the age of seven for the Marconi Stallions, initially playing in a team where she was the only female player.

Cannuli played for the NSW Sapphires in the Women's National Soccer League (WNSL) from the 2000 season. She played in the Sapphires' championship-winning team in 2003.

In 2004, Cannuli stepped away from the game, returning in 2008 with Inter Lions. She was soon invited to train with Sydney FC.

Ahead of the 2011 W-League season, Cannuli joined Brisbane Roar where she played 11 matches in a single season in the Queensland capital.

On 31 January 2014, Cannuli announced her retirement at the conclusion of the season. In her last home match for Western Sydney Wanderers, during the Sydney Derby, Cannuli scored a penalty with the last kick of the match.

=== International career ===
Cannuli made her debut for the Matildas on 12 May 2011 in a 3–0 friendly win against New Zealand at Bluetongue Stadium, Gosford. Cannuli then scored her first goal on 15 May 2011 in another friendly against New Zealand in a 2–1 win at Bluetongue Stadium, Gosford.

== Coaching career ==
Beginning in 2016 Cannuli she started working as a technical director overseeing women's football with the Southern Districts Soccer Football Association (SDSFA). She has also coached with the association's team, SD Raiders, in the New South Wales State League Women's competition as well as being appointed as the technical director of the Women's program from 2019 onward. She led the Raiders to the State League Women's championship in 2016.

In October 2017, after leading SD Raiders to back-to-back Grand Final victories, Cannuli joined Western Sydney Wanderers as an assistant coach under Richard Byrne.

In June 2021, Dean Heffernan stepped down from his coaching role and Cannuli was promoted to be head coach of the team for the 2021/22 season. Kat Smith then took over from Cannuli for 2022/23.

== Honours ==
=== Club ===
With NSW Sapphires:

- Women's National Soccer League Championship: 2003

With Sydney FC:

- W-League Premiership: 2009
- W-League Championship: 2009

=== Individual ===
- Women's National Soccer League Golden Boot: 2003–04
