= Western Sydney Wanderers FC (women) =

Western Sydney Wanderers
- Full name: Western Sydney Wanderers Football Club
- Nickname: Wander Women
- Short name: WSW
- Founded: 2012; 14 years ago
- Ground: Marconi Stadium
- Capacity: 9,000
- Head coach: Geoff Abrahams
- League: A-League Women; NPL NSW
- 2025–26 2025: A-League Women, 11th of 11; NPL NSW, 13th of 14
- Website: http://www.wswanderersfc.com.au
Home colours	Away colours

Western Sydney Wanderers Football Club is an Australian women's football club based in the western region of Sydney, New South Wales, Australia. Founded in 2012, it is the affiliated women's team of the A-League Men team Western Sydney Wanderers.

The team competes in the A-League Women, the top tier of women's soccer in Australia. Additionally, they field a team in the second tier National Premier Leagues NSW Women's.

== History ==
On 4 April 2012, the creation of Western Sydney Wanderers FC was announced by then CEO of Football Federation Australia Ben Buckley. It was also announced soon after that an associated women's team would compete in the W-League. On 5 July 2012, Stephen Roche was announced as the inaugural head coach for the team. On 17 July 2014, Norm Boardman was appointed as head coach for the team. On 20 May 2016, Richard Byrne was appointed as head coach, with Leah Blayney appointed as assistant coach and Davide Del Giovine as goalkeeping coach. On October 2017, former Western Sydney Wanderers player Catherine Cannuli and Ryan Doidge joined Byrne as his assistant coaches.

The Wanderers reached the finals of the A-League Women for the first time in the 2019–20 season, finishing fourth. They were led by youngster Courtney Nevin, Matilda's midfielder Ella Mastrantonio and foreign stars Denise O'Sullivan, Lynn Biyendolo and Julie Dolan medallist Kristen Hamilton.

== Players ==
=== Current squad ===
As of 14 October 2026

Note: Flags indicate national team as defined under FIFA eligibility rules; some limited exceptions apply. Players may hold more than one non-FIFA nationality.

No.	Pos.	Nation	Player
1	GK	AUS	Sarah Langman
2	DF	LBN	Tiana Jaber (vice-captain)
3	DF	AUS	Tegan Bertolissio
4	DF	NOR	Silje Bjørneboe (on loan from Stabæk)
5	DF	AUS	Milly Bennett
6	MF	AUS	Isabella Chidiac
7	MF	GER	Samantha Iredale
8	MF	AUS	Sofia Sakalis
9	FW	COL	Elexa Bahr
10	FW	AUS	Rhianna Pollicina (captain)
11	FW	USA	Brooke Miller
12	GK	NZL	Brianna Edwards
13	DF	AUS	Alvina Khoshaba
15	DF	AUS	Sofia Palywoda

No.	Pos.	Nation	Player
16	MF	AUS	Estelle Fragale
17	FW	AUS	Allyssa Ng-Saad
18	GK	AUS	Aimee Hall
19	MF	AUS	Talia Younis
21	DF	AUS	Laura Pickett
22	MF	PHI	Carleigh Frilles
23	FW	AUS	Miriam Zumaya (scholarship)
24	MF	AUS	Nikkita Fazzari
25	FW	AUS	Holly Caspers
28	FW	AUS	Frida Karaberis
34	MF	AUS	Ruby Betro
—	DF	AUS	Charlotte Bradshaw
—	GK	AUS	Charlotte Church
—	GK	AUS	Sofia Fante

== Head coaches ==
Dates	Name	Ref.
2012–2014	(Australia) Stephen Roche	
2014–2016	(Australia) Norm Boardman	
2016–2018	(Australia) Richard Byrne	
2018–2019	(Australia) Dan Barrett	
2019–2021	(Australia) Dean Heffernan	
2021–2022	(Australia) Catherine Cannuli	
2022–2023	(Australia) Kat Smith	
2023–2025	(Australia) Robbie Hooker	
2025–	(Australia) Geoff Abrahams	

== Season by season record ==
Chart of yearly table positions for Western Sydney Wanderers in A-League Women

Season	A-League Women										Top scorer	
Season	P	W	D	L	F	A	GD	Pts	Pos	Finals	Name	Goals
2012–13	12	4	1	7	19	23	–4	13	6 / 8	—	Louise Fors	5
2013–14	12	2	3	7	17	23	–6	9	7 / 8	—	Catherine Cannuli	6
2014	12	2	2	8	14	42	–28	8	8 / 8	—	Keelin Winters	5
2015–16	12	3	3	6	15	25	–10	12	7 / 9	—	Five players	2
2016–17	12	4	1	7	14	29	–15	13	8 / 9	—	Katie Stengel	6
2017–18	12	3	2	7	13	21	–8	11	8 / 9	—	Erica Halloway	3
2018–19	12	1	1	10	11	30	–19	4	9 / 9	—	Kylie Ledbrook	3
2019–20	12	7	1	4	24	20	+4	22	4 / 9	Semi-finals	Kristen Hamilton	7
2020–21	12	4	1	7	13	21	–8	13	6 / 9	—	Rosie Galea	4
2021–22	14	1	4	9	7	27	–20	7	9 / 10	—	Ashlie Crofts	3
2022–23	18	5	4	9	16	23	–7	19	7 / 11	—	Ashlie Crofts	3
2023-24	22	10	3	9	30	30	0	33	7 / 12	—	**Sophie Harding**	12
2024-25	23	4	4	15	28	46	–18	16	12/12	—	**Sienna Saveska**	7

Champions	Runners-up	Third Place

  - **Bold** denotes a current club player
  - Italics denotes an active statistic

== Broadcasting ==
Select games are broadcast via local radio station Hawkesbury Radio 89.9FM and streamed live on the station's website.

== Records and statistics ==
- Record Win: 5–0 vs. Sydney FC, 20 December 2019
- Record Defeat: 10–1 vs. Perth Glory, 5 October 2014
- Most Goals by a Player in a Game: 3 – Kristen Hamilton vs. Brisbane Roar, 28 November 2019
- Most Wins in a Row: 3 – 14 November 2019 to 28 November 2019
- Longest Undefeated Streak: 6 matches – 14 November 2019 to 26 December 2019
- Most Goals In a Regular season: 7 goals: Kristen Hamilton (in the 2019–20 season)
- Longest Period Without Conceding a Goal: 312 minutes – 7 December 2019 to 12 January 2020. Goalkeeper: Abby Smith

=== Most appearances ===
Danika Matos holds the record for most league appearances with 70 as of 10 November 2024.

Last updated 24 November 2018

	Name	Years	Regular Season	Finals	Total
1	(Australia) Linda O'Neill	2012–2016	41	0	41
2	(Australia) Helen Caceres	2013–2017	40	0	40
3	(Australia) Erica Halloway	2015–present	38	0	38
4	(Australia) Michelle Carney	2013–2016	34	0	34
5	(Australia) Jada Mathyssen-Whyman	2015–2020	33	0	33
6=	(Australia) Alix Roberts	2015–2018	25	0	25
6=	(Australia) Chloe O'Brien	2014–2018	25	0	25
8	(Australia) Jessica Seaman	2012–2014	24	0	24
9=	(England) Hannah Beard	2014–2016	23	0	23
9=	(Australia) Ellie Carpenter	2015–2017	23	0	23
9=	(United States) Keelin Winters	2014–2016	23	0	23

=== Leading scorers ===
Catherine Cannuli holds the record for most league goals with 8 (including finals) as of the start of the 2019/20 season.

- Servet Uzunlar scored the first two goals in Wanderer’s history, be it men or women, when she netted a double in the Wanderers 3–2 loss against Adelaide United on 20 October 2012.

Last updated 16 March 2020

Competitive, professional matches only

	Name	Years	W-League	Finals	Total
1	(Australia) Catherine Cannuli	2012–13 to 2013–14	8	0	8
=2	(United States) Keelin Winters	2014 to 2015–16	7	0	7
=2	(United States) Kristen Hamilton	2019–20	7	0	7
=4	(Australia) Michelle Carney	2013–14 to 2015–16	6	0	6
=4	(Australia) Erica Halloway	2015–16 -present	6	0	6

== See also ==
- List of top-division football clubs in AFC countries
- Women's soccer in Australia
- W-League (Australia) all-time records
- Australia women's national soccer team
