= Queensland Sting FC =

Queensland Sting
- Full name: Queensland Sting Football Club
- Founded: 1996 (as Queensland Academy of Sport)
- Dissolved: 2005
- Ground: Perry Park, Bowen Hills; QSAC, Brisbane
- Capacity: 5,00; 48,500
- Owner: Queensland Academy of Sport
- Chairman: Unknown
- Senior Women's Manager: Mike Mulvey (1997–2005)
- League: Women's National Soccer League
- 2004: 1st

The Queensland Sting (founded in 1996 as the Queensland Academy of Sport) were a women's soccer club that represented the state of Queensland, Australia in the now-defunct Women's National Soccer League. During the 8-seasons of the competition, the Sting won 4 championships making them the most successful club in WNSL history.

== History ==
The Queensland Sting were founded in 1996 as a women's Queensland Academy of Sport team that was chosen to represent Queensland in the inaugural season of the Ansett Summer Series, the first ever women's national soccer competition. The Sting would finish the first season tied on points with the NSW Academy of Sport (Sapphires) on 14 points. To decide who would be crowned the winners of the inaugural season a 40-minute "playoff" was held which the Sting won on penalties. The grand final was held the following day, as Queensland beat South Australia 2–0, with two goals from veteran Australian striker Lisa Dunne.

In 1997, the Sting would recruit future Brisbane Roar Premiership and 2014 Grand Final winner Mike Mulvey, who would lead them to multiple trophies until the end of the league.

From 2000–2001 until the demise of the league in 2004, Queensland Sting would become the dominant force in the WNSL. They were undefeated in the 2000 season going on to defeat NSW Sapphires narrowly in the deciding 2001 Grand Final which drew a record crowd (for the era) of 2,665. The following season would almost be as successful, losing two games, however they would pick up their third national championship in the 2003 Grand Final against an Alen Stajcic coached NSW Sting.

Both the Sapphires and the Sting would meet each other once more in a Grand Final replay some 12 months later, however Stajcic's side prevailed in a decisive 3–1 result, ending the NSW Sapphires 3-straight Grand Final losses.

The Sting would claim the title of the most successful club in the WNSL during its final official season, beating the Northern NSW Pride 2–0 in the 2004 Grand Final.

The Women's National Soccer League would ultimately fold following the 2004 season, however the Australian Women's Soccer Association which in itself was on the verge of its own collapse would see a week long Championship played in the ACT, with the Sting going on to defeat the NSW Sapphire (blue) in the final.

== Home Grounds ==
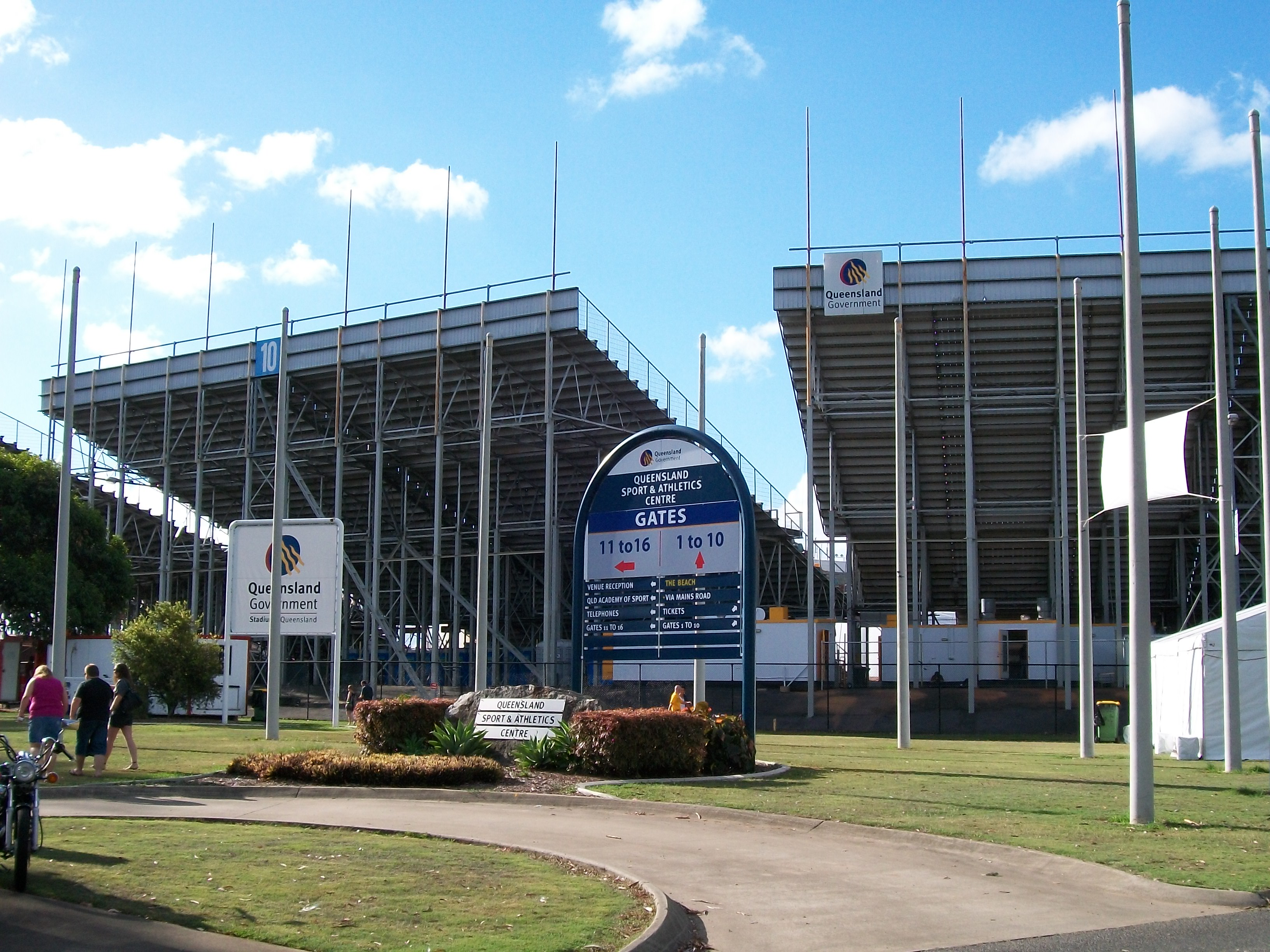
The QSAC where the Queensland Sting would play predominately.

The Queensland Sting would play out of predominantly two home grounds when hosting teams in Queensland. Perry Park in Brisbane. They would also play a large majority of their games at the home of the Queensland Academy of Sport (QAS), Queensland Sport and Athletics Centre.

== Managers ==
Queensland Sting list of managers
Years	Name
1996	(England) Greg Brown
1997–2005	(Australia) Mike Mulvey

== Notable players ==
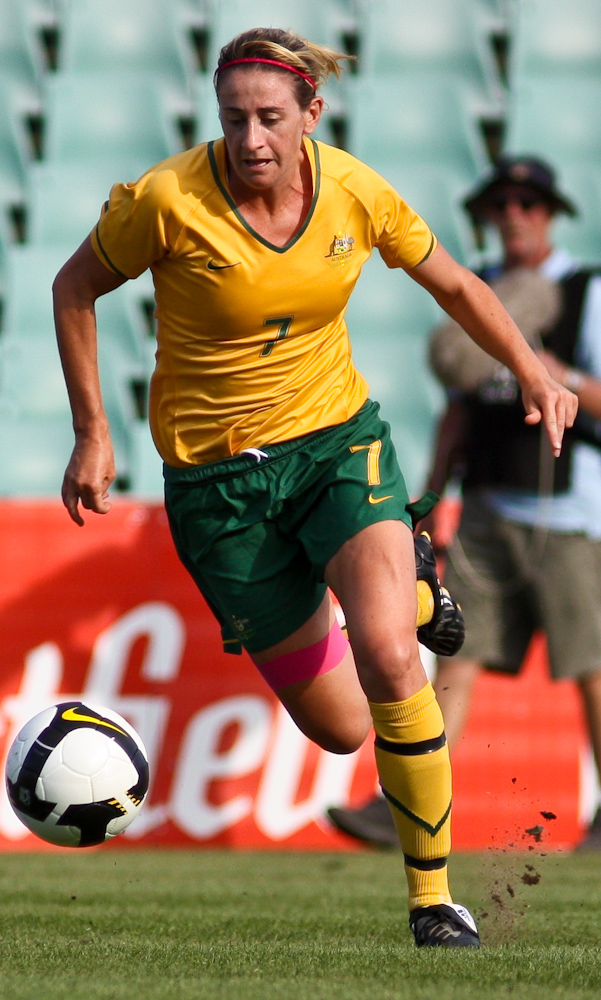
Garrick was capped several times for Australia, and received the Julie Dolan medal whilst at the club

- (Australia) Tammie Thornton
- (Australia) Heather Garriock – 130 appearances for the Matildas and 20 goals.
- (Australia) Karla Reuter

== Honours ==
- WNSL:
  - (gold) WNSL Champions (4): 1996–97, 2000–01, 2002–03, 2004, 2005 (unofficial)
  - (silver) Runners-up (1): 2003
- Julie Dolan Medal
  - Heather Garriock 2002
