= Women's National Soccer League =

- Founded: 1996
- Folded: 2004
- Country: Australia
- Level on pyramid: 1
- Most championships: Queensland Sting (4 titles)

The Women's National Soccer League (WNSL) was Australia's top women's soccer league. Originally known as the Ansett Australia Summer Series for sponsorship reasons, the WNSL began in 1996 consisting of six clubs and continued through until 2004, folding alongside the men's National Soccer League. It was not until 2008 that a women's top flight league was re-established in Australia, named the W-League, which was renamed A-League Women ahead of the 2021–22 season.

== History ==
Women's soccer in Australia up until the 1974 FIFA World Cup where the Australia men's team qualified for the first time, was virtually non-existent in regards to any organised competition or formalized structure. However in August 1974, the first National Women's Championships were held in Sydney between five teams of state representation (New South Wales, Northern New South Wales, Victoria, South Queensland and Western Australia). The matches were played at Granville, Centennial Park, and Bankstown in Sydney, with New South Wales winning the inaugural championship.

Following this initial tournament, representatives from the sides who had participated met and formed the Australian Women's Soccer Association (AWSA). National championships were held annually until 1993. In 1996, the AWSA established the Women's National Soccer League which gained national recognition when the competition was sponsored by Ansett Airlines. Clubs in the league were initially representatives of the various state-based institutes of sports. The league was initially split into two conferences (North & Southern), similar to that of the men's National Soccer League. The southern conference was represented by ACT Academy of Sports (later became Canberra Eclipse), ITC Victoria (later became Victoria Vision), SA Sports Institute (later became Adelaide Sensation). The northern conference was represented by NSW Institute of Sport (later became NSW Sapphires), Queensland Academy of Sport (later became Queensland Sting) and Northern NSW ITC (later became Northern NSW Pride). Western Australia would receive representation during the final season with the introduction of the Western Waves.

The WNSL disbanded in 2004 alongside the National Soccer League. Queensland Sting were the most successful side winning 4 championships.

== Clubs ==
Club	City	Home Ground	Other Names
Adelaide Sensation	Adelaide, South Australia	Hindmarsh Stadium	SA Sports Institute, SASI Buffalo Pirates, Southern Stars
Canberra Eclipse	Canberra, Australian Capital Territory	AIS, McKellar Stadium	ACT Academy of Sports
Northern NSW Pride	Newcastle, New South Wales	Weston Park, Wanderers Oval	Northern NSW ITC, NNSW Horizon
NSW Sapphires FC	Sydney, New South Wales	Sydney United Sports Centre	NSW Institute of Sport
Queensland Sting FC	Brisbane, Queensland	Perry Park, QAS Centre	Queensland Academy of Sport
Victoria Vision (Note: No Victorian team for the 1998/99 WNSL Season, which had five teams.)	Melbourne, Victoria	Bulleen Soccer Club	ITC Victoria
Western Waves (Note: In 2004, Western Waves was given temporary entry to the WNSL for six games. Due to budget constraints, they were unable to complete the second half of the season.)	Perth, Western Australia	Perth Oval	

== Premiers and Champions ==
Season	Rounds	Premier(s)	Champion	Result	Runner-up
1996–97	9	SASI, QAS (Note: There were separate Premiers of the Southern conference (listed first) and the Northern conference, who met in the Grand Final for the Championship.)	QAS	2–1	SASI
1997–98	9	SASI, NSWIS (Note: There were separate Premiers of Pool A (listed first) and Pool B, who met in the Grand Final for the Championship.)	NSWIS	3–2	SASI
1998–99	16	Canberra Eclipse	SASI Pirates	2–0	Canberra Eclipse
1999	10	NSW Sapphires	NSW Sapphires	1–0	SASI Pirates
2000	5	Queensland Sting	Queensland Sting	1–0	NSW Sapphires
2001–02	10	NSW Sapphires	Canberra Eclipse	1–0	NSW Sapphires
2002	10	Queensland Sting	Queensland Sting	1–0	NSW Sapphires
2003	10	Queensland Sting	NSW Sapphires FC	3–1	Queensland Sting
2004	10 (Note: 6 matches for Western Waves.)	Queensland Sting	Queensland Sting	2–0	Northern NSW Pride

== Individual honours ==
=== Julie Dolan Medal ===
The medal is awarded annually to the player voted to be the best player in Women's soccer leagues in Australia, named after former Matildas Captain and football administrator Julie Dolan. The award was for the best player in the WNSL, and is currently maintained in the successor competition, the W-League (now known as the A-League Women). The following table contains only those winners of the medal who were awarded it during the WNSL era.

Year	Winner	Club
1996–97	unknown	
1997–98	Sharon Black	SA Sports Institute
1998–99	Julie Murray	NSWIS Sapphires
1999	Ann Marie Vozzo	SASI Pirates
2000	Taryn Rockall	NSW Sapphires
2001–02	Joanne Peters	NSW Sapphires
2002	Lisa De Vanna; Heather Garriock	Adelaide Sensation; Queensland Sting
2003	N/A	N/A
2004	Taryn Rockall	NSW Sapphires

=== Golden Boot ===
Season	Top Scorer	Club	Goals
1996–97	Kristy Moore (Note: Andrew Howe's Official Westfield W-League 2020/21 Season Guide (2020) shows no awardee, although Moore is listed first under "Top goalscorers" for 1996–97 with 10 goals (includes 1 goal in grand final), followed by Lisa Dunne (Queensland) 9, Sharon Black (South Australia) 8.)	SA Sports Institute	9
1997–98	Sharon Black; Katrina Boyd (Note: Howe: "Top goalscorer award" (league goals) Boyd. "Top goalscorers": Boyd (New South Wales) 9, Black (South Australia) 9, Lisa Casagrande (Canberra) 6, Natalie Thomas (South Australia) 6)	SA Sports Institute; NSW Institute of Sport	11
1998–99	Lisa Casagrande (Note: Howe: "Top goalscorer award" (league goals) Casagrande. "Top goalscorers": Casagrande (Canberra) 16, Lisa Dunne (Queensland) 9, Jessica Halfpenny (South Australia) 8, Sharon Black (South Australia) 7)	Canberra Eclipse	16
1999	Belinda Dawney (Note: Howe: "Top goalscorer award" (league goals) Dawney. "Top goalscorers": Dawney (Queensland) 7, Julie Murray (New South Wales) 6, Sunni Hughes (Northern NSW) 5, Joanne Burgess (New South Wales) 5)	Queensland Sting	7
2000	Taryn Rockall (Note: Howe: "Top goalscorer award" (league goals) Rockall. "Top goalscorers": Taryn Rockall (New South Wales) 6, Kelly Golebiowski (New South Wales) 4, Jessica Halfpenny (South Australia) 4, April Mann (Queensland) 4)	NSW Sapphires	6
2001–02	Caitlin Munoz; Kelly Golebiowski; Alicia Cavanagh (Note: Howe: "Top goalscorer award" (league goals) Munoz sharing with Kelly Golebiowski (NSW) and Alicia Cavanagh (NSW). "Top goalscorers": Munoz (Canberra) 9 (scored a goal in grand final), Golebiowski (New South Wales) 8, Cavanagh (New South Wales) 8, Lia Augimeri (South Australia) 6, Amy Wilson (Canberra) 6)	Canberra Eclipse; NSW Sapphires; NSW Sapphires	9 [8] [8]
2002	Lisa De Vanna (Note: Howe: "Top goalscorer award" (league goals) De Vanna. "Top goalscorers": Lisa De Vanna (South Australia) 9, Kate McShea (Queensland) 5)	Adelaide Sensation	9
2003	Catherine Cannuli (Note: Howe: "Top goalscorer award" (league goals) Cannuli. "Top goalscorers": Catherine Cannuli (New South Wales) 13, Belinda Dawney (Queensland) 10, Lisa De Vanna (South Australia) 10, Jessica Mitchell (Queensland) 8, Michelle Carney (New South Wales) 7)	NSW Sapphires	13
2004	Katie Gill (Note: Howe: "Top goalscorer award" (league goals) Gill. "Top goalscorers": Kate Gill (Northern NSW) 13, Lana Harsh (Queensland) 7, Jessica Mitchell (Queensland) 7, Sasha McDonnell (Queensland) 5)	Northern NSW Pride	13

=== WNSL Rising Star Award ===
Initially known as Young Player of the Year award. First presented after the 1998–99 WNSL season.

Year	Winner	Club
1998–99	Michelle Carney	NSW Sapphires
1999	Ann Marie Vozzo	SASI Pirates
2000	Selin Kuralay	Victoria Vision
2001–02	Lisa De Vanna	Adelaide Sensation
2002	Erin Hunter	Northern NSW Pride
2003		
2004	Sasha McDonnell	Queensland Sting

== See also ==
- W-League (Australia) – Current Australian women's national league
- Women's soccer in Australia
- Geography of women's association football
