= NSW Sapphires FC =

- Full name: NSW Sapphires FC
- Founded: 1996
- Dissolved: 2005
- Ground: Various (see home grounds for further info)
- Owner(s): Football NSW; NSW Institute of Sport
- Chairman: Unknown
- Senior Women's Manager: Alen Stajcic
- League: Women's National Soccer League
- 2004: 3rd (3)

The NSW Sapphires (formerly known as the NSW Institute of Sport) were a women's association football club that represented the State of New South Wales in the Women's National Soccer League which ran between 1996 and 2004. Throughout the nine seasons that the competition ran, the Sapphires won three Championships and were also runners up on three occasions, making them one of the most successful teams in the short-lived league.

The NSW Sapphires had several players who would go onto represent the Matildas at international level, in addition to winning the prestigious Julie Dolan Medal.

== History ==
With the foundation of the Women's National Soccer League in 1994, The NSW Institute of Sport was selected to be the representative for New South Wales and in particular Sydney. Later on in the competition, along with the other clubs they would drop their Institute of Sport names for NSW Sapphires, in favour of more marketable monikers.

The Sapphires would be one of the strongest teams in the competition, winning their first silverware in the 1997–98 season, with experienced Matilda Julie Murray winning the 1998–1999 Julie Dolan Medal. The Sapphires would go on to win two more championships during the 1999 and 2003 seasons, in addition to being runners-up in three consecutive seasons in 2000/01, 2001/02, and 2002/03, losing each final 0–1 to Queensland Sting and Canberra Eclipse FC.

The Sapphires would have further players represent them at the highest level in addition to being recognised for their contribution to the women's game, with Joanne Peters and Taryn Rockall receiving the Julie Dolan medal.

Despite having been defunct for almost 20 years, Football NSW paid tribute to the success and history of the club by naming the new women's state knockout cup the Sapphire Cup.

== Notable players ==
Australia

- Catherine Cannuli: Golden boot winner in the 03/04 season, would go on to play professionally in Australia in the W-League for Western Sydney and Brisbane, as well as representing Australia four times, scoring once against New Zealand.
- Julie Murray
- Joanne Peters
- Taryn Rockall

== Managers ==
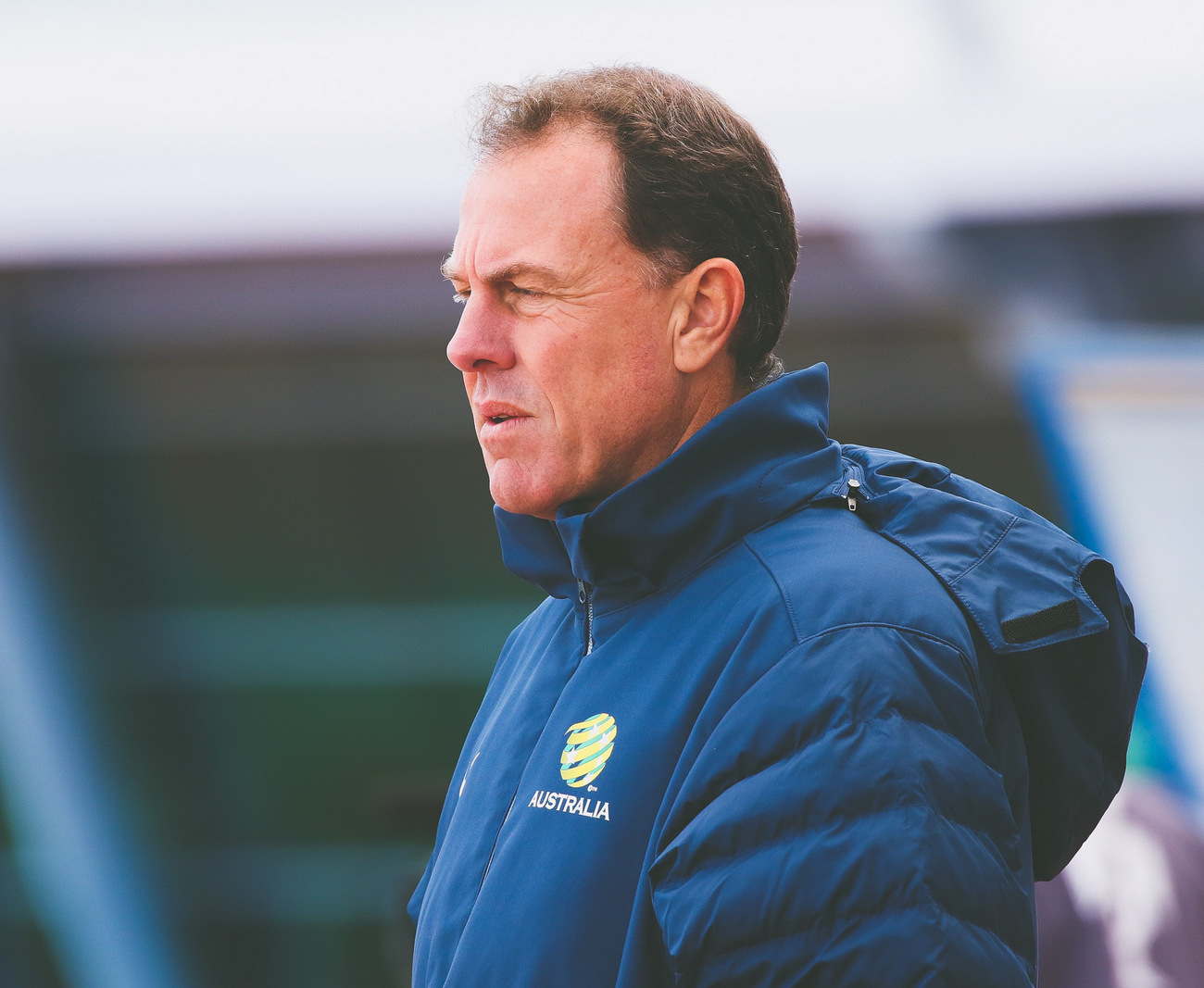
NSW Sapphires were Alen Stajcic's first managerial job

Managers
Years	Name
2002–2004	Alen Stajcic

== Honours ==
- Women's National Soccer League
  - Champions (3): 1997–98, 1999, 2003
  - Runners-up (3): 2000–01, 2001–02, 2002–03
