= Adelaide Sensation FC =

Football club in South Australia

- Full name: Adelaide Sensation Football Club
- Founded: 1996 (as South Australia Sports Institute)
- Dissolved: 2005
- Ground: Hindmarsh Stadium
- Capacity: 16,500
- Owner: Football SA
- Chairman: Unknown
- League: Women's National Soccer League
- 2004: 7th (7)

The Adelaide Sensation (founded in 1996 as the South Australia Sports Institute, and briefly as the SASI Pirates) were a former women's association football club that represented the state of South Australia in the now-defunct Women's National Soccer League. The club had moderate success throughout the tenure of the competition, winning one title in the 1998–1999, and finishing as runners up in the 1996, 1997 and 1999 seasons.

== History ==
With the foundation of the Women's National Soccer League in 1996, it was a sliding doors moment for women's soccer in Australia, as for the first time in the national history of the sport a national competition for women had been introduced, offering opportunities to women all over the country. The inaugural 1996 season saw state based teams from South Australia, Victoria, New South Wales and Queensland. The South Australian Sports Institute (SASI) was designated to be the representative for the state of South Australia. Their first game of the 1996 season saw them play the Victorian Vison. SASI would come away 6-1 winners in a drubbing, with Matildas player Sharon Black scoring 4 goals.

The first two seasons of the league would be successful for the fledgling Adelaide based club, as they reached consecutive 1996 & 1997 grand finals, however losing to Queensland Sting and NSWIS in both finals.

== Notable former players ==
- - Sharon Black (61 caps, 20 goals for Australia. Capped several times whilst at Adelaide Sensation.
- (Australia) – Ann Marie Vozzo Capped 19 times for SASI Pirates/Adelaide Sensation (1999–2002). At 15-years-old, won both Young Player of the Year and the Julie Dolan Medal in 1999.
- - Lisa De Vanna (150 caps, 47 goals for Australia). Started her playing career at Adelaide Sensation. Also represented the Western Waves FC in the WNSL.
- / - Kristy Moore (7 caps, 1 goal for Australia, before switching allegiances and playing 12 caps, 0 goals for England).

== Honours ==
- WNSL:
  - (gold) WNSL Champions (1): 1998-99
  - (silver) Runners-up (3): 1997, 1998, 1999
