= QAS NTC =

QAS
- Full name: Queensland Academy of Sport; Men's Football Program
- Nickname: QAS
- Founded: 1991
- Dissolved: 2013
- Head Coach: Josh McCloughan
- League: NPL Queensland
- TBD
Home colours

The Queensland Academy of Sport Men's Football Program is run by the Queensland Academy of Sport for the state's elite youth football players. The QAS runs this program for both men and women.

== Players ==
=== Notable former players ===
As of 19 November 2022

| Name | Club | Position | Years | Current status |
|---|---|---|---|---|
| Ben Halloran | (Australia) Adelaide United | MF | 2009–2010 | Playing |
| Joshua Brillante | (Australia) Melbourne Victory | MF | 2008–2009 | Playing |
| Mitch Bevan | (Australia) Grange Thistle | MF | 2007–2008 | Playing |
| Tommy Oar | – | MF | 2007–2008 | Retired |
| Daniel Bowles | – | DF | 2007–2008 | Retired |
| Zac Anderson | (Singapore) Hougang United | MF | 2006–2008 | Playing |
| Luke DeVere | (New Zealand) Wellington Phoenix | DF | 2005–2006 | Playing |
| Tahj Minniecon | - | FW | 2005–2006 | Retired |
| Robbie Kruse | – | FW | 2004–2006 | Playing |
| Isaka Cernak | (Australia) Olympic FC | MF | 2004–2006 | Playing |
| David Williams | (Australia) Perth Glory | FW | 2004–2005 | Playing |
| Jimmy Downey | – | MF | 2003–2004 | Retired |
| Matt Mundy | (Australia) Olympic FC | DF | 2003–2004 | Playing |
| Chris Grossman | – | MF | 2002–2003 | Retired |
| Matt McKay | (Australia) Capalaba FC | MF | 1999 | Retired |
| Jade North | - | DF | 1998 | Retired |
| Jonathan McKain | (Australia) Rochedale Rovers | DF | 1998 | Playing |
| Shane Smeltz | - | FW | 1997–1998 | Retired |
| Shane Stefanutto | - | DF | 1997–1998 | Retired |
| Danny Invincibile | – | FW | 1996 | Retired |
| Kasey Wehrman | – | MF | 1995–1996 | Retired |
