= Julie Murray =

Australian soccer player

Personal information
- Full name: Julie Elizabeth Murray
- Date of birth: 28 April 1970 (age 56)
- Place of birth: Adelaide, Australia
- Height: 5 ft 5 in (1.65 m)
- Positions: Midfielder; striker

Senior career*
Years	Team	Apps	(Gls)
1990	Fortuna Hjørring		
2001	Bay Area CyberRays	19	(9)

International career^{‡}
1987–2000	Australia	68	(19)
- * Club domestic league appearances and goals ‡ National team caps and goals as of 25 April 2013

Julie Elizabeth Murray (born 28 April 1970) is an Australian soccer player who appeared in 68 international matches for the Australia women's national association football team during a 13-year international career. She played professional club football in Denmark and the United States.

== International career ==
Murray attended the 1986 OFC Women's Nations Cup as a 15-year-old, and played against New Zealand's B team during the tournament. Her first full cap – and first goal – came in a 6–0 win over Hong Kong at the following year's Women's World Invitational Tournament in Taiwan. She played in all four matches as Australia made it to the quarter-finals of the 1988 FIFA Women's Invitation Tournament.
