= Canberra Eclipse FC =

Australian women's soccer club

Canberra Eclipse
- Full name: Canberra Eclipse Football Club
- Founded: 1996 (As ACT Academy of Sport)
- Dissolved: 2005
- Ground: Australian Institute of Sport; McKellar Park
- Capacity: 3,500
- League: Women's National Soccer League

The Canberra Eclipse (founded in 1996 as the ACT Academy of Sport) were a women's soccer club that represented the city of Canberra and the Australian Capital Territory in the now defunct Women's National Soccer League. The Canberra Eclipse played in all 8 seasons of the WNSL, winning the Championship during the 2001–02 season, and finishing runners up in 1998–99. The club featured several players that would go on to represent the Matildas and are considered to be the forerunner for the professional W-League club Canberra United FC.

== History ==
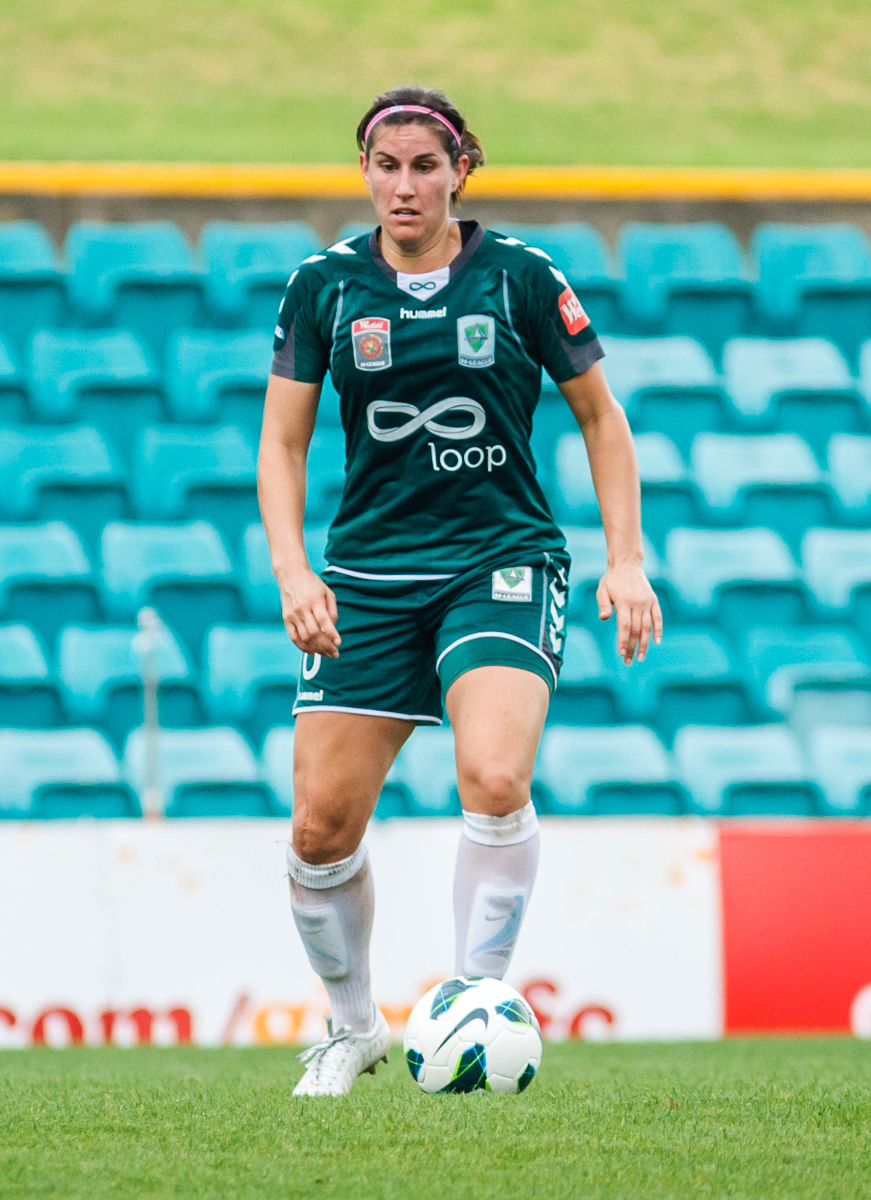
18-year old Munoz would score the only goal in Canberra's 2002 Grand Final win.

The Women's National Soccer League was founded in 1996 by the Australian Women's Soccer Association (AWSA), and was the first women's soccer competition to be held nationally in Australia. The six foundation clubs, broken up into two conferences of three teams each, were represented by the individual states elite Academy of Sports. The ACT was to be represented by the Australian Institute of Sport.

The 1998–99 season saw the club adopt the moniker of the Canberra Eclipse, as clubs in the competition sought to move away from their academy roots, and attempt to garner interest and visibility on the league The club would go on to win its first silverware, winning the regular season, however losing to the SA Pirates 2–0 in the grand final. Further success would come during the 2001–02 season, as the beat the NSW Sapphires in the Grand Final having gone into the final classed as underdogs, with 18-year-old telent Caitlin Munoz scoring the only goal of the game.

== Honours ==
- WNSL:
  - (gold) WNSL Champions (1): 2001–02
  - (silver) Runners-up (1): 1998–99

== Notable players ==
- (Australia) Sacha Wainwright – 65 appearances for the Matildas including at the 2004 Olympics. Also captained the Eclipse during their 2001–02 Championship.
- Lisa Casagrande – 64 appearances, 13 goals Matildas. 1997–98 WNSL Golden Boot (16). 2015 Football Australia Hall of Fame inductee

== Managers ==
Canberra Eclipse list of managers
Years	Name
1996–1998	(England) Chris Tanzey
1998–1999	(Australia) Ian Murray
2000	(Australia) Rod Lynes
2001–2002	(Australia) Clive MacKillop
