= 2009 Central Coast Mariners FC (women) season =

Central Coast Mariners (W-League)
2009 season
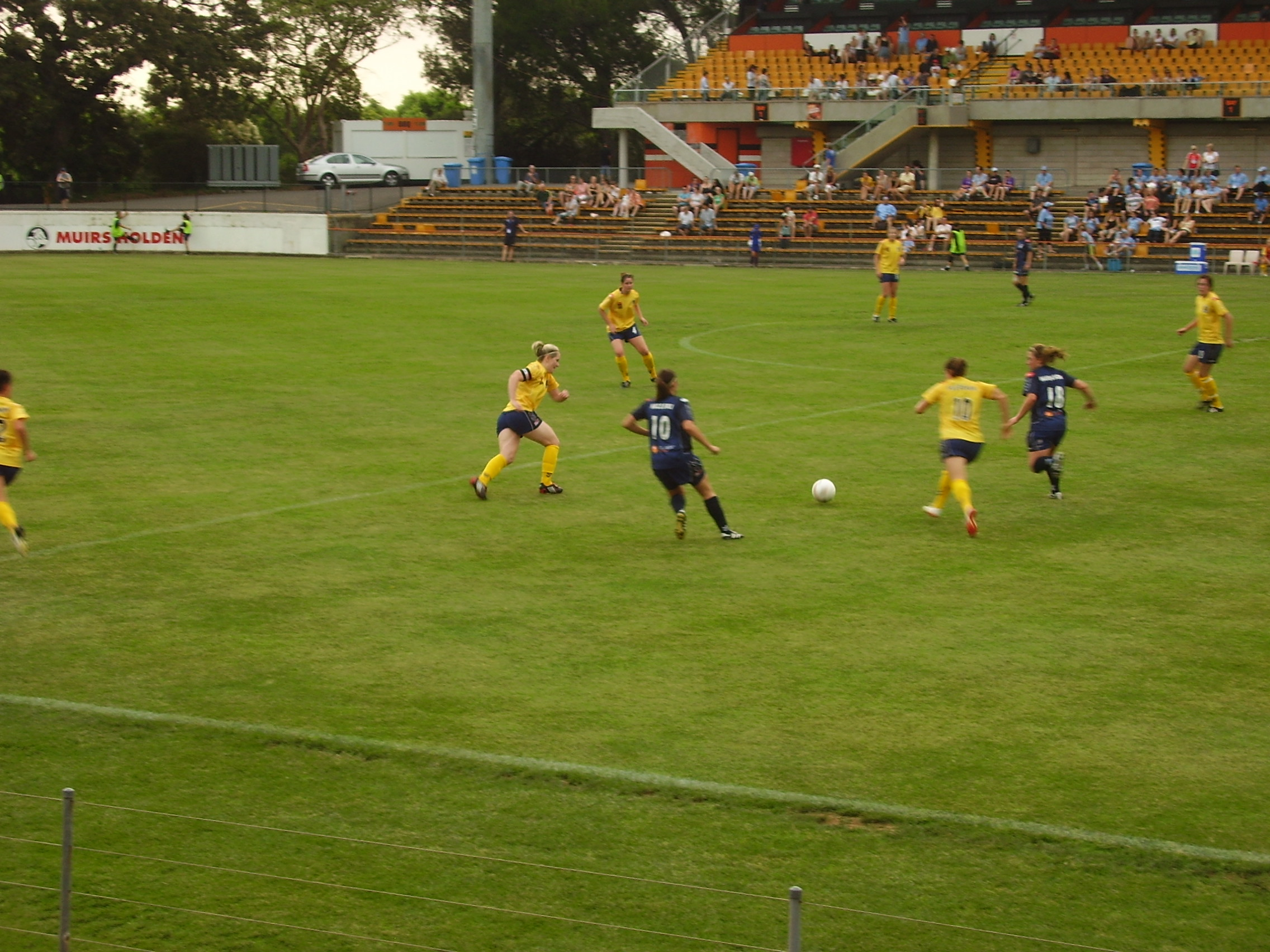
- Central Coast Mariners playing against Melbourne Victory at Leichhardt Oval
- Chairman: Ian Kernan
- Manager: Stephan Roche
- W-League: 2nd
- W-League Finals: Semi-finals
- Top goalscorer: League: Michelle Heyman (11); All: Michelle Heyman (11)
- Biggest win: 6–0 vs. Adelaide United (A) (14 November 2009); W-League
- Biggest defeat: 0–1 vs. Queensland Roar (A) (18 October 2009); W-League; 0–1 vs. Sydney FC (H) (5 December 2009); W-League; 0–1 vs. Brisbane Roar (H) (13 December 2009); W-League Finals

The 2009 season was the Central Coast Mariners' second season of soccer in Australia's A-League Women (then known as the W-League).

== Players ==
Note: Flags indicate national team as defined under FIFA eligibility rules; some limited exceptions apply. Players may hold more than one non-FIFA nationality.

No.	Pos.	Nation	Player
1	GK	USA	Jillian Loyden
2	DF	AUS	Caitlin Cooper (captain)
3	DF	AUS	Lyndsay Glohe
4	DF	AUS	Rachael Doyle
5	DF	AUS	Jessica Seaman
6	MF	AUS	Karina Roweth
7	MF	AUS	Teresa Polias
8	FW	AUS	Kelly Golebiowski
9	MF	AUS	Renee Rollason
10	DF	USA	Kendall Fletcher
11	FW	AUS	Michelle Heyman

No.	Pos.	Nation	Player
12	DF	AUS	Samantha Spackman
13	MF	AUS	Trudy Camilleri
14	FW	AUS	Ashleigh Connor
15	MF	AUS	Elizabeth O'Reilly
16	FW	AUS	Jenna Kingsley
17	MF	AUS	Britt Simmons
18	FW	AUS	Caitlin Foord
19	MF	USA	Lydia Vandenbergh
20	GK	AUS	Rachel Cooper
—	MF	AUS	Gillian Foster

== Transfers ==
=== Transfers in ===
- Rachel Cooper (Sydney FC)
- Jessica Seaman (Sydney FC)
- Samantha Spackman (Sydney FC)
- Caitlin Foord (AIS)
- Ashleigh Connor (Illawarra Stingrays)
- Kelly Golebiowski (Sydney FC)
- Michelle Heyman (Sydney FC)
- Jillian Loyden (Saint Louis Athletica)
- Kendall Fletcher (Saint Louis Athletica)
- Lydia Vandenbergh

=== Transfers out ===
- Emma-Kate Dewhurst
- Lisa Hartley
- Katie Daly
- Hayley Abbott
- Jodie Bain
- Ellyse Perry (Canberra United)
- Kathryn Pryer
- Brooke Starrett
- Taryn Rockall
- Kyah Simon (Sydney FC)
- Emma Stewart

== Competitions ==
=== Overall record ===
Competition	First match	Last match	Starting round	Final position	Record							
Competition	First match	Last match	Starting round	Final position	Pld	W	D	L	GF	GA	GD	Win %
W-League	5 October 2009	5 December 2009	Matchday 1	2nd	10	7	1	2	24	7	+17	70.00
W-League Finals	13 December 2009		Semi-finals	Semi-finals	1	0	0	1	0	1	−1	0.00
Total					11	7	1	3	24	8	+16	63.64

Source: Competitions

=== W-League ===
==== League table ====
Pos	Team	Pld	W	D	L	GF	GA	GD	Pts	Qualification
1	Sydney FC (C)	10	7	2	1	25	10	+15	23	Qualification to Finals series
2	Central Coast Mariners	10	7	1	2	24	7	+17	22	Qualification to Finals series
3	Brisbane Roar	10	6	3	1	24	7	+17	21	Qualification to Finals series
4	Canberra United	10	4	2	4	17	12	+5	14	Qualification to Finals series
5	Melbourne Victory	10	4	2	4	9	10	−1	14	
6	Perth Glory	10	4	1	5	11	22	−11	13	
7	Adelaide United	10	0	3	7	7	31	−24	3	
8	Newcastle Jets	10	0	2	8	7	25	−18	2	

Source: au.soccerway.com
Rules for classification: 1) points; 2) goal difference; 3) number of goals scored.
(C) Champions

==== Results summary ====
Overall								Home						Away					
Pld	W	D	L	GF	GA	GD	Pts	W	D	L	GF	GA	GD	W	D	L	GF	GA	GD
10	7	1	2	24	7	+17	22	3	1	1	8	3	+5	4	0	1	16	4	+12

Source: worldfootball.net

==== Results by round ====
Round	1	2	3	4	5	6	7	8	9	10
Ground	A	H	A	A	H	A	A	H	H	H
Result	W	W	L	W	D	W	W	W	W	L
Position	2	1	2	2	2	2	2	1	1	2
Points	3	6	6	9	10	13	16	19	22	22

Source: worldfootball.net
A = Away; H = Home; W = Win; D = Draw; L = Loss

==== Matches ====
Win Draw Loss

5 October 2009 1	Sydney FC	1–3	Central Coast Mariners	Sydney
12:15 AEDT	Walsh 46'	Report	Heyman 12', 63'; Golebiowski 90+1'	Stadium: Sydney Football Stadium; Referee: Peta McCallum

11 October 2009 2	Central Coast Mariners	2–0	Adelaide United	Gosford
12:15 AEDT	Camilleri 73'; Connor 87'	Report		Stadium: Bluetongue Stadium; Referee: Kate Jacewicz

18 October 2009 3	Brisbane Roar	1–0	Central Coast Mariners	Brisbane
18:00 AEST	McDonnell 81'	Report		Stadium: Ballymore Stadium; Attendance: 744; Referee: Pru Donohue

24 October 2009 4	Newcastle Jets	1–5	Central Coast Mariners	Newcastle
16:00 AEDT	Andrews 88'	Report	Vandenbergh 5'; Heyman 21', 26'; Fletcher 63' (pen.); Camilleri 82'	Stadium: Wanderers Oval; Attendance: 750; Referee: Kirralee Gardner

31 October 2009 5	Central Coast Mariners	1–1	Canberra United	Canberra
16:15 AEDT	Brush 3'	Report	Fletcher 20'	Stadium: Canberra Stadium; Referee: Kate Jacewicz

7 November 2009 6	Perth Glory	1–2	Central Coast Mariners	Perth
15:00 AWST	Tabain 63'	Report	Vandenbergh 20'; Heyman 57'	Stadium: Clipsal Stadium; Referee: Lee Corey

14 November 2009 7	Adelaide United	0–6	Central Coast Mariners	Adelaide
14:30 ACDT		Report	Heyman 22', 40', 59'; Connor 45'; Fletcher 51'; Vandenbergh 73'	Stadium: Hindmarsh Stadium; Referee: Lee Corey

21 November 2009 8	Central Coast Mariners	2–0	Melbourne Victory	Sydney
17:00 AEDT	Heyman 27', 52'	Report		Stadium: Leichhardt Oval; Referee: Kirralee Gardener

27 November 2009 9	Central Coast Mariners	3–1	Newcastle Jets	Gosford
17:15 AEDT	Heyman 36'; Fletcher 71'; Vandenbergh 74'	Report	Andrews 44'	Stadium: Bluetongue Stadium; Referee: Peta McCallum

5 December 2009 10	Central Coast Mariners	0–1	Sydney FC	Gosford
15:00 AEDT		Report	Khamis 35'	Stadium: Bluetongue Stadium; Attendance: 800; Referee: Kate Jacewicz

==== Finals series ====
13 December 2009 Semi-finals	Central Coast Mariners	0–1	Brisbane Roar	Gosford
15:00 AEDT		Report	Reuter 62'	Stadium: Bluetongue Stadium; Referee: Kirralee Gardener

== Statistics ==
Last updated 8 November 2009

No.	Pos.	Name	W-League		W-League Finals		Total		Discipline	
No.	Pos.	Name	Apps	Goals	Apps	Goals	Apps	Goals	Yellow card	Red card
1	GK	(United States) Jillian Loyden	6	0	0	0	6	0	0	0
2	DF	(Australia) Caitlin Cooper	6	0	0	0	6	0	0	0
3	DF	(Australia) Lyndsay Glohe	6	0	0	0	6	0	0	0
4	DF	(Australia) Rachael Doyle	6	0	0	0	6	0	0	0
5	DF	(Australia) Jessica Seaman	3	0	0	0	3	0	0	0
7	MF	(Australia) Teresa Polias	2	0	0	0	2	0	0	0
8	FW	(Australia) Kelly Golebiowski	6	1	0	0	6	1	1	0
9	MF	(Australia) Renee Rollason	6	0	0	0	6	0	1	0
10	DF	(United States) Kendall Fletcher	6	2	0	0	6	2	2	0
11	FW	(Australia) Michelle Heyman	6	5	0	0	6	5	0	0
12	DF	(Australia) Samantha Spackman	6	0	0	0	6	0	0	0
13	MF	(Australia) Trudy Camilleri	6	2	0	0	6	2	0	0
14	FW	(Australia) Ashleigh Connor	4	1	0	0	4	1	0	0
15	MF	(Australia) Elizabeth O'Reilly	0	0	0	0	0	0	0	0
16	FW	(Australia) Jenna Kingsley	5	0	0	0	5	0	0	0
17	MF	(Australia) Britt Simmons	1	0	0	0	1	0	0	0
18	FW	(Australia) Caitlin Foord	0	0	0	0	0	0	0	0
19	MF	(United States) Lydia Vandenbergh	6	2	0	0	6	2	0	0
20	GK	(Australia) Rachel Cooper	0	0	0	0	0	0	0	0
--	MF	(Australia) Gillian Foster	0	0	0	0	0	0	0	0
