= 2008–09 Central Coast Mariners FC (women) season =

Central Coast Mariners (W-League)
2008–09 season
- Chairman: Ian Kernan
- Manager: Stephan Roche
- W-League: 6th
- W-League Finals: DNQ
- Top goalscorer: Kyah Simon (5)
- Highest home attendance: 832 vs. Perth Glory (1 November 2008); W-League
- Lowest home attendance: 211 vs. Newcastle Jets (29 November 2008); W-League
- Average home league attendance: 613
- Biggest win: 6–0 vs. Adelaide United (A) (6 December 2008); W-League
- Biggest defeat: 0–5 vs. Queensland Roar (H) (15 November 2008); W-League

The 2008–09 season was the Central Coast Mariners' first season of soccer in Australia's A-League Women (then known as the W-League).

== Players ==
Note: Flags indicate national team as defined under FIFA eligibility rules; some limited exceptions apply. Players may hold more than one non-FIFA nationality.

No.	Pos.	Nation	Player
1	GK	AUS	Emma-Kate Dewhurst
2	DF	AUS	Caitlin Cooper (captain)
3	DF	AUS	Lyndsay Glohe
4	DF	AUS	Rachael Doyle
5	DF	AUS	Jodie Bain
6	MF	AUS	Karina Roweth
7	MF	AUS	Teresa Polias
8	MF	AUS	Renee Rollason
9	DF	AUS	Ellyse Perry
10	FW	AUS	Kyah Simon
11	FW	AUS	Stephanie Haim
12	MF	AUS	Gillian Foster

No.	Pos.	Nation	Player
13	MF	AUS	Trudy Camilleri
14	MF	AUS	Taryn Rockall
15	MF	AUS	Elizabeth O'Reilly
16	DF	AUS	Kathryn Pryer
17	MF	AUS	Britt Simmons
18	FW	AUS	Emma Stewart
19	DF	AUS	Hayley Abbott
20	GK	AUS	Lisa Hartley
23	FW	AUS	Jenna Kingsley
25	DF	AUS	Brooke Starrett
30	GK	AUS	Katie Daly

== Transfers ==
=== Transfers in ===
Date from	Position	Name	From	Fee	Ref.
13 October 2008	DF	Jodie Bain	Free agent	Free transfer	
13 October 2008	MF	Trudy Camilleri	Free agent	Free transfer	
13 October 2008	DF	Caitlin Cooper	Free agent	Free transfer	
13 October 2008	GK	Emma-Kate Dewhurst	Free agent	Free transfer	
13 October 2008	DF	Rachael Doyle	Free agent	Free transfer	
13 October 2008	MF	Gillian Foster	Free agent	Free transfer	
13 October 2008	DF	Lyndsay Glohe	Free agent	Free transfer	
13 October 2008	FW	Stephanie Haim	Free agent	Free transfer	
13 October 2008	GK	Lisa Hartly	Free agent	Free transfer	
13 October 2008	MF	Elizabeth O'Reilly	Free agent	Free transfer	
13 October 2008	DF	Ellyse Perry	Free agent	Free transfer	
13 October 2008	MF	Teresa Polias	Free agent	Free transfer	
13 October 2008	DF	Kathryn Pryer	Free agent	Free transfer	
13 October 2008	MF	Taryn Rockall	Free agent	Free transfer	
13 October 2008	MF	Renee Rollason	Free agent	Free transfer	
13 October 2008	MF	Karina Roweth	Free agent	Free transfer	
13 October 2008	MF	Britt Simmons	Free agent	Free transfer	
13 October 2008	FW	Kyah Simon	Free agent	Free transfer	
13 October 2008	FW	Emma Stewart	Free agent	Free transfer	

== Competitions ==
=== Overall record ===
Competition	First match	Last match	Starting round	Final position	Record							
Competition	First match	Last match	Starting round	Final position	Pld	W	D	L	GF	GA	GD	Win %
W-League	25 October 2008	27 December 2008	Matchday 1	6th	10	4	0	6	15	20	−5	40.00
Total					10	4	0	6	15	20	−5	40.00

Source: Competitions

=== W-League ===
==== League table ====
Pos	Team	Pld	W	D	L	GF	GA	GD	Pts	Qualification
1	Queensland Roar (C)	10	8	1	1	27	7	+20	25	Qualification to Finals series
2	Newcastle Jets	10	5	2	3	17	12	+5	17	Qualification to Finals series
3	Canberra United	10	4	4	2	14	10	+4	16	Qualification to Finals series
4	Sydney FC	10	4	2	4	15	14	+1	14	Qualification to Finals series
5	Melbourne Victory	10	4	0	6	13	13	0	12	
6	Central Coast Mariners	10	4	0	6	15	20	−5	12	
7	Perth Glory	10	3	2	5	14	24	−10	11	
8	Adelaide United	10	2	1	7	13	28	−15	7	

Rules for classification: 1) points; 2) goal difference; 3) number of goals scored.
(C) Champions

==== Results summary ====
Overall								Home						Away					
Pld	W	D	L	GF	GA	GD	Pts	W	D	L	GF	GA	GD	W	D	L	GF	GA	GD
10	4	0	6	15	20	−5	12	2	0	3	7	13	−6	2	0	3	8	7	+1

Source: worldfootball.net

==== Results by round ====
Round	1	2	3	4	5	6	7	8	9	10
Ground	A	H	A	H	A	H	A	H	A	H
Result	L	W	W	L	L	L	W	L	L	W
Position	6	5	4	6	7	7	6	6	7	6
Points	0	3	6	6	6	6	9	9	9	12

Source: worldfootball.net
A = Away; H = Home; W = Win; D = Draw; L = Loss

==== Matches ====
Win Loss

25 October 2008 1	Melbourne Victory	2–0	Central Coast Mariners	Melbourne
16:00 AEDT	Oostdam 52'; Tegg 60'	Report		Stadium: Telstra Dome; Attendance: 2,000; Referee: Lee Corey

1 November 2008 2	Central Coast Mariners	3–1	Perth Glory	Sydney
18:00 AEDT	Camilleri 69'; Rollason 83', 90+1' (pen.)	Report	May 85'	Stadium: Parramatta Stadium; Attendance: 832; Referee: Amelia Morris

9 November 2008 3	Canberra United	1–2	Central Coast Mariners	Canberra
17:00 AEDT	Brush 51' (pen.)	Report	Simon 46', 73'	Stadium: McKellar Park; Attendance: 1,637; Referee: Jacqui Melksham

15 November 2008 4	Central Coast Mariners	0–5	Queensland Roar	Sydney
18:00 AEDT		Report	Polkinghorne 12'; Harch 66'; Colthorpe 68'; Kellond-Knight 80'; Latham 89'	Stadium: Campbelltown Stadium; Referee: Kate Jacewicz

22 November 2008 5	Sydney FC	2–0	Central Coast Mariners	Sydney
18:00 AEDT	Khamis 23'; Gilbert 38'	Report		Stadium: Campbelltown Stadium; Attendance: 652; Referee: Prue Donohoe

29 November 2008 6	Central Coast Mariners	2–4	Newcastle Jets	Sydney
18:00 AEDT	Rollason 65'; Simon 90+1'	Report	Jones 34'; van Egmond 44', 46'; Peters 77'	Stadium: Campbelltown Stadium; Attendance: 211; Referee: Kirralee Gardener

6 December 2008 7	Adelaide United	0–6	Central Coast Mariners	Adelaide
15:30 ACDT		Report	Camilleri 35', 58'; Kingsley 50', 60'; Simon 62', 83'	Stadium: Hindmarsh Stadium; Referee: Kate Jacewicz

13 December 2008 8	Central Coast Mariners	0–3	Canberra United	Sydney
18:00 AEDT		Report	Brush 21'; Crawford 71'; Munoz 78'	Stadium: Parramatta Stadium; Referee: Kirralee Gardener

20 December 2008 9	Queensland Roar	2–0	Central Coast Mariners	Brisbane
18:00 AEST	Beutel 51'; Harch 57'	Report		Stadium: Ballymore Stadium; Attendance: 940; Referee: Prue Donohoe

27 December 2008 10	Central Coast Mariners	2–0	Melbourne Victory	Sydney
16:00 AEDT	Kingsley 87'; O'Reilly 90+2'	Report		Stadium: Parramatta Stadium; Attendance: 795; Referee: Kate Jacewicz

== Statistics ==
=== Appearances and goals ===
Includes all competitions. Players with no appearances not included in the list.

No.	Pos	Nat	Player	Total		W-League	
No.	Pos	Nat	Player	Apps	Goals	Apps	Goals
1	GK	(Australia) AUS	Emma-Kete Dewhurst	5	0	4+1	0
2	DF	(Australia) AUS	Caitlin Cooper	10	0	10	0
3	DF	(Australia) AUS	Lyndsay Glohe	10	0	10	0
4	DF	(Australia) AUS	Rachael Doyle	10	0	10	0
5	DF	(Australia) AUS	Jodie Bain	9	0	9	0
6	MF	(Australia) AUS	Karina Roweth	8	0	8	0
7	MF	(Australia) AUS	Teresa Polias	9	0	9	0
8	MF	(Australia) AUS	Renee Rollason	10	3	10	3
9	DF	(Australia) AUS	Ellyse Perry	3	0	0+3	0
10	FW	(Australia) AUS	Kyah Simon	9	5	9	5
11	FW	(Australia) AUS	Stephanie Haim	5	0	2+3	0
12	MF	(Australia) AUS	Gillian Foster	9	0	5+4	0
13	MF	(Australia) AUS	Trudy Camilleri	10	3	10	3
14	MF	(Australia) AUS	Taryn Rockall	2	0	1+1	0
15	MF	(Australia) AUS	Elizabeth O'Reilly	8	1	1+7	1
16	DF	(Australia) AUS	Kathryn Pryer	2	0	0+2	0
17	MF	(Australia) AUS	Britt Simmons	4	0	2+2	0
18	FW	(Australia) AUS	Emma Stewart	2	0	0+2	0
20	GK	(Australia) AUS	Lisa Hartley	7	0	6+1	0
23	FW	(Australia) AUS	Jenna Kingsley	5	3	4+1	3
25	DF	(Australia) AUS	Brooke Starrett	1	0	0+1	0

- Source: worldfootball.net

=== Disciplinary record ===
Includes all competitions. The list is sorted by squad number when total cards are equal. Players with no cards not included in the list.

No.	Pos	Nat	Player	Total			W-League		
No.	Pos	Nat	Player	Yellow card	Second yellow card	Red card	Yellow card	Second yellow card	Red card
20	GK	(Australia) AUS	Lisa Hartley	0	0	1	0	0	1
2	DF	(Australia) AUS	Caitlin Cooper	2	0	0	2	0	0
8	MF	(Australia) AUS	Renee Rollason	2	0	0	2	0	0
23	FW	(Australia) AUS	Jenna Kingsley	2	0	0	2	0	0
3	DF	(Australia) AUS	Lyndsay Glohe	1	0	0	1	0	0
6	MF	(Australia) AUS	Karina Roweth	1	0	0	1	0	0
7	MF	(Australia) AUS	Teresa Polias	1	0	0	1	0	0
13	MF	(Australia) AUS	Trudy Camilleri	1	0	0	1	0	0

- Source: worldfootball.net
- (yellow card) = Number of bookings; (second yellow card) = Number of sending offs after a second yellow card; (red card) = Number of sending offs by a direct red card.
