= 2015–16 Sydney FC (women) season =

8th season in existence of Sydney FC (women)

Sydney FC (women)
2015–16 season
- Owner: David Traktovenko
- Chairman: Scott Barlow
- Head Coach: Dan Barrett
- Stadium: Lambert Park
- W-League: 3rd
- W-League Finals: Runners-up
- Top goalscorer: League: Kyah Simon (5); All: Kyah Simon (6)
- Highest home attendance: 2,650 vs. Newcastle Jets (9 January 2016); W-League
- Lowest home attendance: 678 vs. Perth Glory (8 November 2015); W-League
- Average home league attendance: 1,178
- Biggest win: 4–2 vs. Perth Glory (A) (13 December 2015); W-League; 2–0 vs. Newcastle Jets (H) (9 January 2016); W-League
- Biggest defeat: 0–6 vs. Melbourne City (H) (18 October 2015); W-League
Home colours	Away colours

The 2015–16 season was Sydney Football Club (women)'s eighth season in the W-League. Sydney FC finished 3rd in their W-League season, and finished as runners-up in the W-League Finals.

== Players ==
Note: Flags indicate national team as defined under FIFA eligibility rules; some limited exceptions apply. Players may hold more than one non-FIFA nationality.

No.	Pos.	Nation	Player
1	GK	USA	Michelle Betos
2	DF	AUS	Elizabeth Ralston
3	DF	AUS	Ellyse Perry
4	FW	AUS	Sunny Franco
5	FW	USA	Jasmyne Spencer
6	MF	AUS	Teresa Polias
7	MF	AUS	Nicola Bolger
8	MF	AUS	Amy Harrison
9	FW	AUS	Princess Ibini-Isei
10	DF	AUS	Renee Rollason
11	DF	AUS	Natalie Tobin

No.	Pos.	Nation	Player
12	MF	AUS	Olivia Price
13	MF	AUS	Trudy Camilleri
14	DF	AUS	Alanna Kennedy
15	DF	AUS	Teigen Allen
16	MF	AUS	Hannah Bacon
17	FW	AUS	Kyah Simon
18	FW	AUS	Leena Khamis
19	GK	AUS	Sham Khamis
20	DF	AUS	Lyndsay Glohe
21	GK	AUS	Alyssa Harris
22	FW	AUS	Heidi Makrillos

== Transfers and contracts ==
=== Transfers in ===
No.	Position	Player	Transferred from	Type/fee	Date	Ref.
4	FW	Sunny Franco	Brisbane Roar	Free transfer	12 August 2015	
9	FW	Princess Ibini-Isei	Unattached	Free transfer	12 August 2015	
14	DF	Alanna Kennedy	Unattached	Free transfer	12 August 2015	
19	GK	Sham Khamis	Unattached	Free transfer	12 August 2015	
1	GK	(United States) Michelle Betos	(United States) Portland Thorns	Loan	24 September 2015	
20	DF	Lyndsay Glohe	(Australia) Bankstown City	Free transfer	16 October 2015	

=== Transfers out ===
No.	Position	Player	Transferred to	Type/fee	Date	Ref.
1	GK	Casey Dumont	Unattached	Free transfer	12 August 2015	
12	MF	Chloe Logarzo	Newcastle Jets	Free transfer	7 October 2015	
4	DF	Alesha Clifford	(Australia) Marconi Stallions	Free transfer	16 October 2015	
6	DF	Servet Uzunlar	(Australia) APIA Leichhardt	Free transfer	16 October 2015	
16	DF	(United States) Samantha Johnson	(Australia) Manly United	Loan return	16 October 2015	
18	FW	Heidi Makrillos	(Australia) North West Sydney Koalas	Free transfer	16 October 2015	
20	GK	Alyssa Harris	(United States) Chicago Red Stars	Free transfer	16 October 2015	

=== Contract extensions ===
No.	Position	Player	Duration	Date	Ref.
2	DF	Elizabeth Ralston	1 year	6 September 2015	
3	DF	Ellyse Perry	1 year	6 September 2015	
5	FW	(United States) Jasmyne Spencer	1 year	6 September 2015	
6	MF	Teresa Polias	1 year	6 September 2015	
7	MF	Nicola Bolger	1 year	6 September 2015	
8	MF	Amy Harrison	1 year	6 September 2015	
10	DF	Renee Rollason	1 year	6 September 2015	
11	DF	Natalie Tobin	1 year	6 September 2015	
12	MF	Olivia Price	1 year	6 September 2015	
13	MF	Trudy Camilleri	1 year	6 September 2015	
15	DF	Teigen Allen	1 year	6 September 2015	
17	FW	Kyah Simon	1 year	6 September 2015	
18	FW	Leena Khamis	1 year	6 September 2015	

== Pre-season and friendlies ==
Win Draw Loss

18 September 2015	Sydney FC (Australia)	3–1	(Australia) Illawarra Stingrays	Wollongong
	Harrison 28'; L. Khamis 58'; Kennedy 70'	Report	Baker 14'	Stadium: WIN Stadium; Attendance: 1,490; Referee: Kelly Jones

== Competitions ==
=== Overall record ===
Competition	First match	Last match	Starting round	Final position	Record							
Competition	First match	Last match	Starting round	Final position	Pld	W	D	L	GF	GA	GD	Win %
W-League	18 October 2015	16 January 2016	Matchday 1	3rd	12	6	1	5	15	21	−6	50.00
W-League Finals	24 January 2016	31 January 2016	Semi-finals	Runners-up	2	1	0	1	2	4	−2	50.00
Total					14	7	1	6	17	25	−8	50.00

Source: Competitions

=== W-League ===
==== League table ====
Pos	Team	Pld	W	D	L	GF	GA	GD	Pts	Qualification
1	Melbourne City (C)	12	12	0	0	38	4	+34	36	Qualification to Finals series
2	Canberra United	12	8	2	2	26	8	+18	26	Qualification to Finals series
3	Sydney FC	12	6	1	5	15	21	−6	19	Qualification to Finals series
4	Brisbane Roar	12	5	1	6	16	17	−1	16	Qualification to Finals series
5	Adelaide United	12	3	4	5	18	19	−1	13	
6	Newcastle Jets	12	3	4	5	9	12	−3	13	
7	Western Sydney Wanderers	12	3	3	6	15	25	−10	12	
8	Perth Glory	12	3	2	7	10	23	−13	11	
9	Melbourne Victory	12	2	1	9	10	28	−18	7	

Source: A-Leagues
Rules for classification: 1) points; 2) goal difference; 3) number of goals scored.
(C) Champions

==== Results summary ====
Overall								Home						Away					
Pld	W	D	L	GF	GA	GD	Pts	W	D	L	GF	GA	GD	W	D	L	GF	GA	GD
12	6	1	5	15	21	−6	19	2	1	3	5	12	−7	4	0	2	10	9	+1

Source: worldfootball.net

==== Results by round ====
Round	1	2	3	4	5	6	7	8	9	10	11	12	13	14
Ground	H	A	A	H	B	H	A	H	A	H	A	B	H	A
Result	L	L	W	W	X	L	W	D	W	L	W	X	W	L
Position	9	9	7	4	6	8	4	3	3	3	3	3	3	3
Points	0	0	3	6	6	6	9	10	13	13	16	16	19	19

Source: worldfootball.net
A = Away; H = Home; B = Bye; W = Win; D = Draw; L = Loss; X = Bye

==== Matches ====
The league fixtures were announced on 7 September 2015.

18 October 2015 1	Sydney FC	0–6	Melbourne City	Sydney
17:30 AEDT		Report	Crummer 11', 45'; De Vanna 39'; Goad 43'; Tabain 61'; Ayres 89'	Stadium: Lambert Park; Attendance: 960; Referee: Rebecca Durcau

24 October 2015 2	Canberra United	3–0	Sydney FC	Canberra
16:00 AEDT	Sykes 9'; Pérez 58'; Munoz 68'	Report		Stadium: McKellar Park; Attendance: 1,009; Referee: Rachael Mitchenson

1 November 2015 3	Western Sydney Wanderers	1–2	Sydney FC	Sydney
14:00 AEDT	Grey 82'	Report	Khamis 2', 37'	Stadium: Pirtek Stadium; Attendance: 2,432; Referee: Rebecca Durcau

8 November 2015 4	Sydney FC	1–0	Perth Glory	Sydney
16:00 AEDT	Simon 14'	Report		Stadium: Lambert Park; Attendance: 678; Referee: Kate Jacewicz

22 November 2015 6	Sydney FC	0–1	Canberra United	Sydney
16:00 AEDT		Report	Sykes 88'	Stadium: Lambert Park; Attendance: 710; Referee: Casey Reibelt

27 November 2015 7	Adelaide United	0–1	Sydney FC	Adelaide
19:00 ACDT		Report	Spencer 68'	Stadium: Adelaide Shores Football Centre; Referee: Kate Jacewicz

6 December 2015 8	Sydney FC	2–2	Western Sydney Wanderers	Sydney
16:00 AEDT	Kennedy 9'; Simon 74'	Report	Beard 19'; Grey 84'	Stadium: Lambert Park; Attendance: 891; Referee: Katie Petterson

13 December 2015 9	Perth Glory	2–4	Sydney FC	Perth
16:00 AWST	DiBernardo 5', 85' (pen.)	Report	Spencer 26'; Simon 37', 84'; Bolger 48'	Stadium: Ashfield Reserve; Referee: Katie Petterson

20 December 2015 10	Sydney FC	0–3	Brisbane Roar	Gosford
14:00 AEDT		Report	Butt 19'; Kennedy 38' (o.g.); Polkinghorne 63'	Stadium: Central Coast Stadium; Referee: Kate Jacewicz

27 December 2015 11	Melbourne Victory	1–2	Sydney FC	Melbourne
14:00 AEDT	Barbieri 46'	Report	Khamis 10'; Spencer 22'	Stadium: AAMI Park; Referee: Rachael Mitchenson

9 January 2016 13	Sydney FC	2–0	Newcastle Jets	Sydney
14:00 AEDT	Simon 33' (pen.); Khamis 59'	Report		Stadium: ANZ Stadium; Attendance: 2,650; Referee: Kate Jacewicz
Note: Match originally scheduled for 10 January at Lambert Park, but rescheduled for 9 January at ANZ Stadium.

16 January 2016 14	Melbourne City	2–1	Sydney FC	Melbourne
14:00 AEDT	Kennedy 52' (o.g.); Tabain 85'	Report	Ibini-Isei 71'	Stadium: CB Smith Reserve; Referee: Katie Petterson

==== Finals series ====
24 January 2016 Semi-finals	Canberra United	0–1	Sydney FC	Canberra
14:00 AEDT		Report	Spencer 62'	Stadium: McKellar Park; Attendance: 2,131; Referee: Casey Reibelt

31 January 2016 Grand final	Melbourne City	4–1	Sydney FC	Melbourne
14:00 AEDT	Beattie 32'; Little 54'; Goad 79'; De Vanna 90+5'	Report	Simon 69' (pen.)	Stadium: AAMI Park; Referee: Kate Jacewicz
