= 2000 Women's National Soccer League =

5th season of the Women's National Soccer League

Women's National Soccer League
- Season: 2000
- Dates: 3 November – 16 December 2000
- Champions: Queensland Sting; 2nd title
- Premiers: Queensland Sting; 1st title
- Matches: 17
- Goals: 55 (3.24 per match)
- Biggest away win: Adelaide Sensation 0–5 NSW Sapphires (2 December 2000)
- Highest scoring: NSW Sapphires 5–1 Northern NSW Pride (17 November 2000)
- Longest winning run: 5 matches Queensland Sting
- Longest unbeaten run: 5 matches Queensland Sting
- Longest winless run: 5 matches Canberra Eclipse
- Longest losing run: 4 matches Canberra Eclipse

The 2000 Women's National Soccer League was the fifth season of the Women's National Soccer League. The season began on 3 November 2000, and concluded with the grand final on 16 December 2000.

NSW Sapphires were the defending champions, as Queensland Sting won their second championship in a 1–0 win over NSW Sapphires in the grand final.

== Teams ==
Locations of the 2000 Women's National Soccer League
- Adelaide Sensation
- Canberra Eclipse
- Northern NSW Pride
- NSW Sapphires
- Queensland Sting
- Victoria Vision

== Regular season ==
=== League table ===
Pos	Team	Pld	W	D	L	GF	GA	GD	Pts	Qualification or relegation
1	Queensland Sting	5	5	0	0	12	1	+11	15	Qualification for Finals series (Note: The top team enters the finals series at the grand final, while the teams ranked second to third enter the finals series at the semi-finals.)
2	NSW Sapphires	5	3	1	1	15	7	+8	10	Qualification for Finals series
3	Northern NSW Pride	5	2	0	3	7	11	−4	6	Qualification for Finals series
4	Adelaide Sensation	5	2	0	3	4	8	−4	6	
5	Victoria Vision	5	1	2	2	6	9	−3	5	
6	Canberra Eclipse	5	0	1	4	4	12	−8	1	

Source: OzFootball
Rules for classification: 1) points; 2) goal difference; 3) number of goals scored.

=== Results ===
==== Round 1 ====
3 November 2000	Northern NSW Pride	2–1	Victoria Vision	Sydney
	McMinn 49', 63'	Report	68' (o.g.)	Stadium: Valentine Sports Park

3 November 2000	Queensland Sting	1–0	Adelaide Sensation	Sydney
	Maza 56'	Report		Stadium: Valentine Sports Park

3 November 2000	NSW Sapphires	2–1	Canberra Eclipse	Sydney
	Rockall 19', 50'	Report	Rawson 82'	Stadium: Valentine Sports Park

==== Round 2 ====
5 November 2000	Adelaide Sensation	2–1	Northern NSW Pride	Sydney
	Halfpenny 13', 56'	Report	Amber Neilson 68'	Stadium: Valentine Sports Park

5 November 2000	Canberra Eclipse	0–3	Queensland Sting	Sydney
		Report	Maza 37'; Revell 58'; Dunne 65'	Stadium: Valentine Sports Park

5 November 2000	Victoria Vision	2–2	NSW Sapphires	Sydney
	Kuralay 78'; Terek 90+1'	Report	Garriock 13'; Rockall 90+2'	Stadium: Valentine Sports Park

==== Round 3 ====
17 November 2000	Victoria Vision	0–3	Queensland Sting	Canberra
		Report	Ferguson 1'; Mann 12'; Revell 90'	Stadium: Ainslie Football Club

17 November 2000	NSW Sapphires	5–1	Northern NSW Pride	Canberra
	Kristine Collins 21'; Rockall 47', 83'; Golebiowski 63', 78'	Report	Gill 34'	Stadium: Ainslie Football Club

17 November 2000	Canberra Eclipse	0–2	Adelaide Sensation	Canberra
		Report	Halfpenny 1', 67'	Stadium: Ainslie Football Club

==== Round 4 ====
19 November 2000	Queensland Sting	3–1	NSW Sapphires	Canberra
	Maza 3'; Mann 25'; Revell 29'	Report	McLaughlin 11'	Stadium: Ainslie Football Club

19 November 2000	Adelaide Sensation	0–1	Victoria Vision	Canberra
		Report	Terek 68'	Stadium: Ainslie Football Club

19 November 2000	Northern NSW Pride	3–1	Canberra Eclipse	Canberra
	Dunne 11'; Gill 30'; McMinn 47'	Report	Taylor 84'	Stadium: Ainslie Football Club

==== Round 5 ====
2 December 2000	Adelaide Sensation	0–5	NSW Sapphires	Adelaide
		Report	Warrener 3'; McLaughlin 24'; Carney 44'; Rockall 64'; Cannuli 82'	Stadium: Hindmarsh Stadium

2 December 2000	Victoria Vision	2–2	Canberra Eclipse	Melbourne
	Kuralay 34'; Terek 54'	Report	Thomson 24'; 85' (o.g.)	Stadium: Epping Stadium

3 December 2000	Northern NSW Pride	0–2	Queensland Sting	Coffs Harbour
		Report	Mann 41', 62'	Stadium: Coffs Harbour International Stadium

== Finals series ==
=== Semi-final ===
9 December 2000

NSW Sapphires	5–1	Northern NSW Pride
McLaughlin 26'; Slatyer 43'; Golebiowski 59', 75'; Gilbert 87'	Report	Dunne 89'

St George Stadium, Sydney

=== Grand final ===
16 December 2000

Queensland Sting	1–0	NSW Sapphires
Bartlett 56'	Report

Suncorp Stadium, Brisbane
Attendance: 2,665

== Awards ==
Award	Winner	Club
Julie Dolan Medal	(Australia) Taryn Rockall	NSW Sapphires
Golden Boot	(Australia) Taryn Rockall	NSW Sapphires
Rising Star	(Australia) Selin Kuralay	Victoria Vision

Ref.
