= Jenna Kingsley =

Australian soccer player

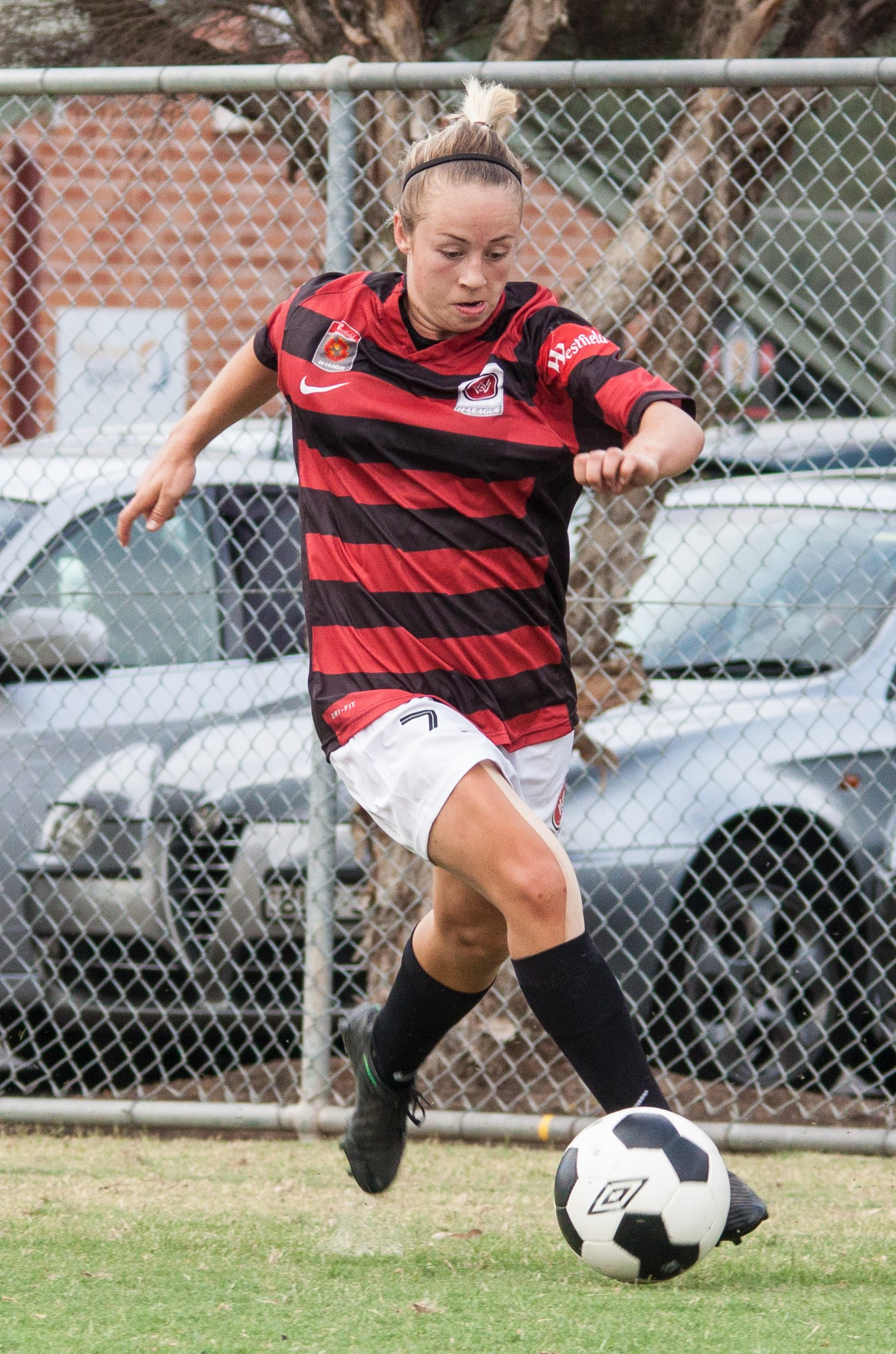
- Kingsley playing for Western Sydney Wanderers in 2013

Personal information
- Full name: Jenna Kingsley
- Date of birth: 24 March 1992 (age 34)
- Place of birth: Penrith, Australia
- Height: 1.85 m (6 ft 1 in)
- Position: Striker

Youth career
- Emu Plains (NSW)
- Penrith RSL (NSW)
- Penrith SC (NSW)

Senior career*
Years	Team	Apps	(Gls)
2008–2010	Central Coast Mariners	39	(16)
2012–2014	Western Sydney Wanderers	55	(38)
2015–2020	Newcastle Jets	194	(135)

International career^{‡}
2007–2008	Australia U17	7	(1)
2007-	Australia	74	(51)
- * Club domestic league appearances and goals as of 11 December 2019 ‡ National team caps and goals as of 09:52, 3 November 2020 (UTC)

Jenna Kingsley (born 24 March 1992) is a retired Australian soccer player, who played for Central Coast Mariners, Western Sydney Wanderers, and Newcastle Jets in the Australian W-League.

== Early life ==
Kingsley was born in Penrith and grew up in Cambridge Park. She is a cousin of English footballer Kyle Bartley.

== Club career ==
=== Junior football ===
Kingsley played her junior football in Western Sydney for Emu Plains, Penrith RSL and Penrith SC.

=== Central Coast Mariners ===
Kingsley made her debut for Central Coast Mariners against Newcastle Jets on Saturday, 29 November 2008 after being substituted on for teammate Britt Simmons. She then made her scoring debut in round 7 against Adelaide United scoring a double and assisting the team to a record 6–0 win away from home. Kingsley then scored her third goal in the last round of her first season against Melbourne Victory assisting the team to a 2–0 win at home which knocked Melbourne out of the finals.

=== Western Sydney Wanderers ===
In 2012, Kingsley joined new expansion club Western Sydney Wanderers for their inaugural season.

=== Newcastle Jets ===
Kingsley joined Newcastle Jets ahead of the 2015–16 W-League season.

== International career ==
Kingsley made her first appearance for the Australia women's national soccer team against Hong Kong in an Olympic Games qualifier as a second-half substitute for Caitlin Cooper. She then scored the final goal of the match in the 83rd minute to make the score 8–1. Her debut game featured seven other, then-fellow Mariners' teammates Rachael Doyle, Lyndsay Glohe, Teresa Polias, Renee Rollason, Ellyse Perry, Kyah Simon and Caitlin Cooper. to this day she has made 74 appearances scoring 51 goals for the Australian women's national team.

== Retirement ==
In November 2020, Kingsley retired from football after making 288 appearances, and scoring 189 goals in the W-League.
