= 2008–09 Women's National Cricket League season =

Cricket tournament

Women's National Cricket League 2008–09 season
- Dates: 29 November 2008 – 25 January 2009
- Administrator: Cricket Australia
- Cricket format: Limited overs cricket (50 overs)
- Tournament format(s): Group stage and final
- Champions: New South Wales (11th title)
- Runners-up: Victoria
- Participants: 5
- Matches: 21
- Player of the series: (New South Wales) Alex Blackwell
- Most runs: (South Australia) Karen Rolton (431)
- Most wickets: (New South Wales) Erin Osborne (15) (Victoria (state)) Kristen Beams (15)
- Official website: cricket.com.au

The 2008–09 Women's National Cricket League season was the 13th season of the Women's National Cricket League, the women's domestic limited overs cricket competition in Australia. The tournament started on 29 November 2008 and finished on 25 January 2009. Defending champions New South Wales Breakers won the tournament for the 11th time after topping the ladder at the conclusion of the group stage and beating Victorian Spirit in the final.

== Ladder ==
As of 19 January 2009

Pos	Team	Pld	W	L	T	NR	BP	Pts	NRR
1	New South Wales	8	8	0	0	0	6	38	1.180
2	Victoria	8	6	2	0	0	0	24	0.169
3	Western Australia	8	2	5	1	0	2	12	−0.444
4	Queensland	8	2	5	1	0	1	11	−0.172
5	South Australia	8	1	7	0	0	0	4	−0.684

Updated to match(es) played on 19 January 2009. Source:
Rules for classification: The top two ranked teams qualified for the final.
- Points system: 4 for a win, 2 each for a tie or a no result, 0 for a loss, 1 each for an abandoned match.
- Bonus point system: 2 for win with a run rate twice that of the opposition, 1 for win with a run rate 1.25 times that of the opposition.

== Fixtures ==
=== Final ===
24 January 2009
Scorecard

Victoria; 117 (44.5 overs)	v	New South Wales; 4/120 (34.2 overs)
Clea Smith 39 (60); Ellyse Perry 4/23 (8.5 overs)		Leah Poulton 43 (69); Sarah Elliott 1/11 (5 overs)

New South Wales won by 6 wickets.
Sydney Cricket Ground
Umpires: Gerard Abood and Peter Tate
Player of the match: Ellyse Perry

- New South Wales won the toss and elected to field.
- New South Wales won the 2008–09 Women's National Cricket League.

== Statistics ==
=== Highest totals ===
Team	Score	Against	Venue	Date
South Australia	7/250	New South Wales	Adelaide Oval	21 December 2008
Victoria	8/248	South Australia	Adelaide Oval	6 December 2008
Victoria	6/246	Western Australia	Junction Oval	9 January 2009
New South Wales	7/230	Victoria	Hurstville Oval	19 January 2009
Victoria	7/227	New South Wales	Hurstville Oval	19 January 2009

=== Most runs ===
Player	Team	Mat	Inns	NO	Runs	HS	Ave	BF	SR	100	50
Karen Rolton	South Australia	8	8	0	431	100	53.87	721	59.77	1	4
Leah Poulton	New South Wales	9	9	0	376	62	41.77	525	71.61	0	5
Alex Blackwell	New South Wales	9	9	3	372	101*	62.00	561	66.31	1	3
Rachael Haynes	Victoria	9	9	1	357	105	44.62	543	65.74	1	1
Kris Britt	South Australia	8	8	2	319	87	53.16	439	72.66	0	3

=== Most wickets ===
Player	Team	Mat	Inns	Overs	Mdns	Runs	Wkts	BBI	Ave	SR	4WI
Erin Osborne	New South Wales	9	9	86.0	20	213	15	4/18	14.20	34.4	1
Kristen Beams	Victoria	9	9	62.4	0	314	15	5/38	20.93	25.0	0
Selena Tainton	Queensland	8	8	55.2	3	226	13	3/43	17.38	25.5	0
Sarah Andrews	New South Wales	9	9	74.3	10	241	13	3/23	18.53	34.3	0
Jess Jonassen	Queensland	8	8	68.0	6	238	12	3/43	19.83	34.0	0
