= Ashleigh Connor =

Australian soccer player

Personal information
- Full name: Ashleigh Connor
- Date of birth: 3 September 1989
- Place of birth: Australia
- Date of death: 21 July 2011 (aged 21)
- Place of death: Cataract, New South Wales, Australia
- Position: Forward

Senior career*
Years	Team	Apps	(Gls)
2009	Illawarra Stingrays	?	(?)
2009–2011	Central Coast Mariners	?	(?)
- * Club domestic league appearances and goals as of 18 September 2009

Ashleigh Connor (3 September 1989 – 21 July 2011) was an Australian soccer player, who played for the Central Coast Mariners in the Australian W-League.

Connor made her debut for the Mariners in 2009. She was signed by the Mariners prior to the 2009 W-League season from the NSW Arrive Alive Women's Premier League club Illawarra Stingrays. Her Stingrays strike partner Michelle Heyman was also signed by the Mariners.

Connor played for the Australian national team – the Matildas – in the 2008 FIFA U-20 Women's World Cup Qualifiers during 2007.

Connor also played for the Marconi Stallions (2008) and Macarthur Rams prior to her move to the Stallions at Bossley Park.

On 21 July 2011, Connor was involved in a car accident on Appin Road in Cataract between Wollongong and Campbelltown that led to her death.
