= Rachel Cooper (soccer) =

Australian football player

Personal information
- Date of birth: 14 March 1989 (age 37)
- Place of birth: Mullumbimby, Australia
- Height: 1.75 m (5 ft 9 in)
- Position: Goalkeeper

Senior career*
Years	Team	Apps	(Gls)
2008–2009	Sydney FC	2	(0)
2009–2010	Central Coast Mariners	0	(0)

International career^{‡}
2007–	Australia	1	(0)
- * Club domestic league appearances and goals as of 6 January 2009 ‡ National team caps and goals as of 12 July 2010

Rachel Cooper (born 14 March 1989) is an Australian association football player who last played for Central Coast Mariners in the Australian W-League. She played for Sydney FC during the 2008–09 season of the W-League.

Rachel signed from Sydney FC in the off-season to join the Mariners.
