= Gillian Foster =

Australian soccer player

Personal information
- Full name: Gillian Foster
- Date of birth: 28 August 1976 (age 50)
- Place of birth: Sydney, Australia
- Height: 1.69 m (5 ft 7 in)
- Position: Midfielder

Senior career*
Years	Team	Apps	(Gls)
2000–2004	Canberra Eclipse	32	(4)
2008–2010	Central Coast Mariners	9	(0)

International career^{‡}
2002–2005	Australia	39	(1)
- * Club domestic league appearances and goals as of 11 October 2016 ‡ National team caps and goals as of 3 July 2011

Gillian Foster née Thomson (born 28 August 1976) is an Australian soccer player who played for Canberra Eclipse in the Women's National Soccer League (WNSL) and Central Coast Mariners in the W-League. She is currently a goalkeeper for South West Rocks Football Club.

== Club career ==
Gillian made her W-League debut against Melbourne Victory on Saturday, 25 October 2008. Foster currently plays for South West Rocks Football Club as a goalkeeper.

== International career ==
Foster played 39 times for Australia between 2002 and 2005. She was member of Australian team at the 2003 FIFA Women's World Cup and the winning Australian team at the 2003 OFC Women's Championship.

== Personal life ==
Foster is a qualified electrician.
