= Ellyse Perry =

Australian cricketer and soccer player (born 1990)

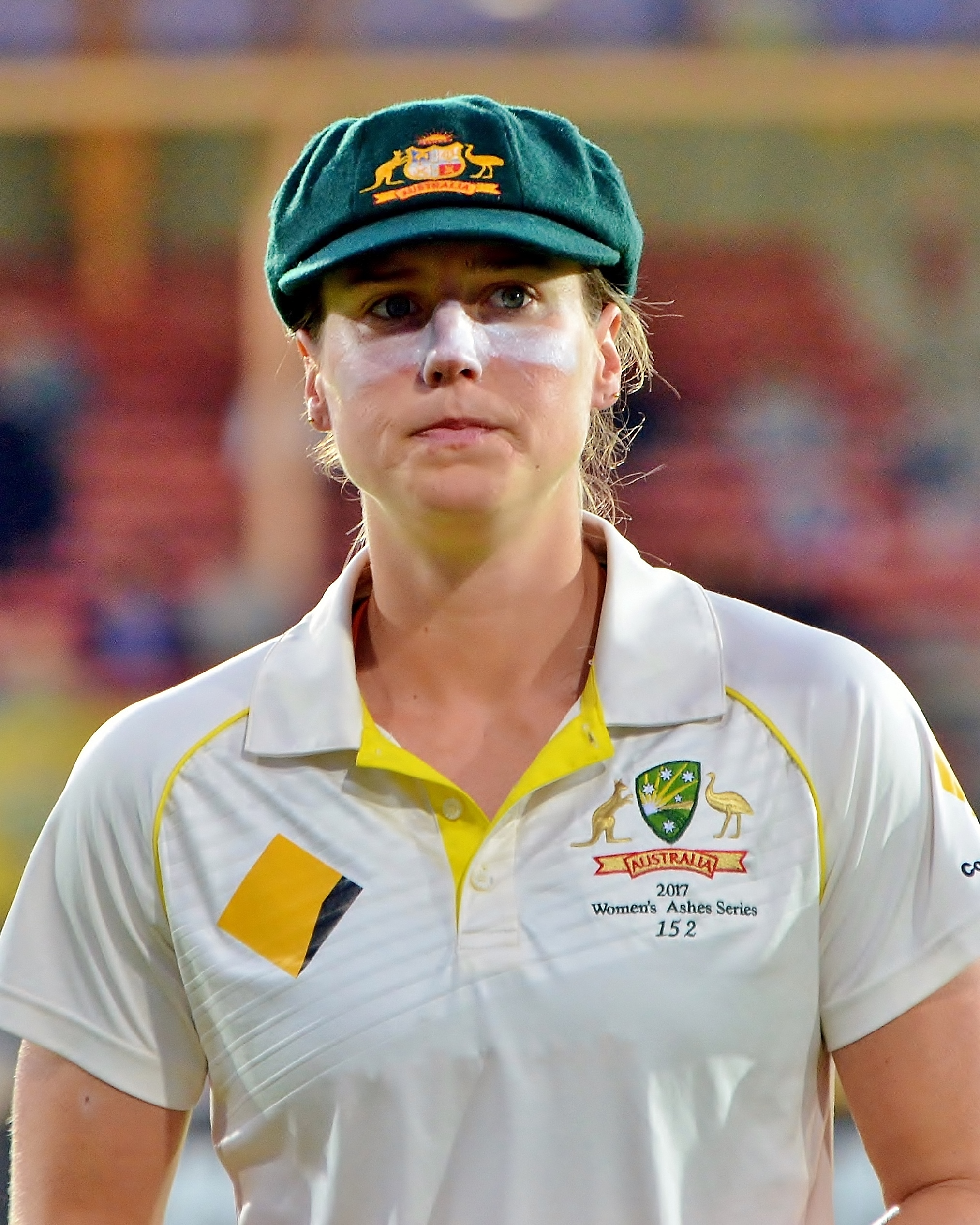
- Perry during the Women's Ashes in 2017

Personal information
- Full name: Ellyse Alexandra Perry
- Born: 3 November 1990 (age 36); Wahroonga, New South Wales, Australia
- Nickname: Pez
- Height: 1.76 m (5 ft 9 in)
- Batting: Right-handed
- Bowling: Right-arm fast-medium
- Role: All-rounder
- Relatives: Matt To'omua (m. 2015; sep. 2020)
- Website: ellyseperry.com

International information
- National side: Australia (2007–present)
- Test debut (cap 152): 15 February 2008 v England
- Last Test: 6 March 2026 v India
- ODI debut (cap 109): 22 July 2007 v New Zealand
- Last ODI: 30 October 2025 v India
- ODI shirt no.: 8
- T20I debut (cap 21): 1 February 2008 v England
- Last T20I: 21 February 2026 v India
- T20I shirt no.: 8

Domestic team information
- Years: Team
- 2007/08–2018/19: New South Wales
- 2015/16–present: Sydney Sixers
- 2016–2017: Loughborough Lightning
- 2018: Supernovas
- 2019/20–2023/24: Victoria
- 2022–present: Birmingham Phoenix
- 2023–present: Royal Challengers Bangalore
- 2024/25: Wellington
- 2025: Hampshire
- 2025–present: New South Wales

Career statistics
Competition	Test	ODI	T20I	LA
Matches	15	165	171	269
Runs scored	1006	4,504	2,201	7,417
Batting average	59.17	48.43	30.15	47.85
100s/50s	2/5	3/37	0/9	11/50
Top score	213*	112*	75	147
Balls bowled	2,061	5,806	2,447	10,310
Wickets	39	166	126	298
Bowling average	21.82	25.56	18.92	23.98
5 wickets in innings	2	3	0	5
10 wickets in match	0	0	0	0
Best bowling	6/32	7/22	4/12	7/22
Catches/stumpings	6/–	56/–	49/–	95/–
Medal record
Women's cricket
Representing Australia
Commonwealth Games
Gold medal – first place	2022 Birmingham
ICC Cricket World Cup
Winner	2013 India
Winner	2022 New Zealand
ICC T20 World Cup
Winner	2010 West Indies
Winner	2012 Sri Lanka
Winner	2014 Bangladesh
Winner	2018 West Indies
Winner	2020 Australia
Winner	2023 South Africa
Winner	2026 England & Wales
Runner-up	2016 India
- Source: ESPNCricInfo, 10 March 2026
Association football career
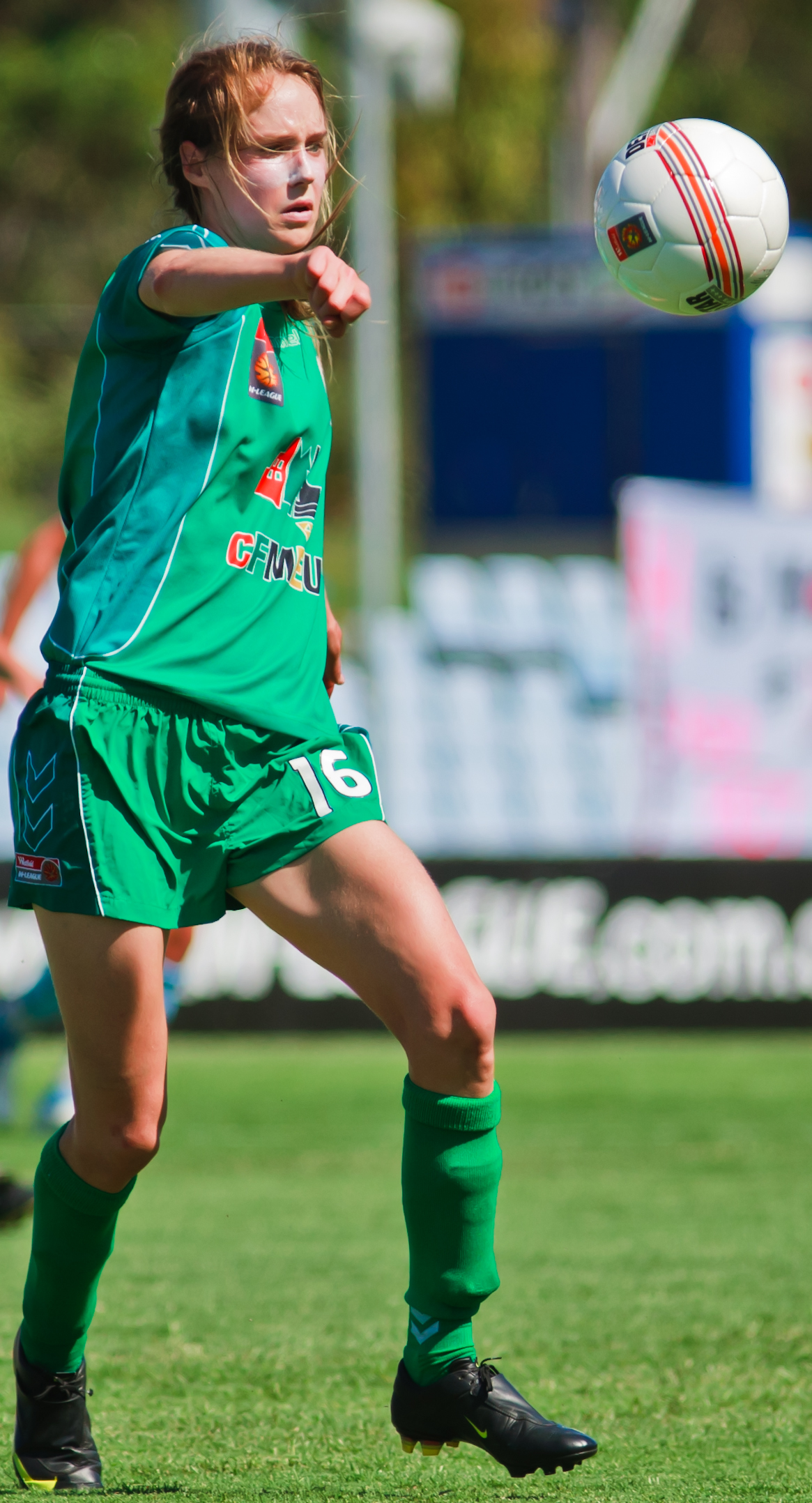
- Perry playing for Canberra United in 2009
- Position: Defender
Youth career
- 2008: NSW Sapphires
Senior career*
Years	Team	Apps	(Gls)
2008–2009	Central Coast Mariners	3	(0)
2009–2012	Canberra United	24	(2)
2012–2016	Sydney FC	18	(1)
Total		45	(3)
International career^{‡}
2007	Australia U-20	3	(0)
2007–2013	Australia	18	(3)
- * Club domestic league appearances and goals as of 13 September 2016 ‡ National team caps and goals as of 17 July 2011

Ellyse Alexandra Perry (born 3 November 1990) is an Australian international cricketer and former soccer player. Having debuted for both the national cricket and national soccer team at the age of 16, she is the youngest Australian to play international cricket and the first to appear in both ICC and FIFA World Cups. Gradually becoming a single-sport professional athlete from 2014 onward, Perry's acclaimed cricket career has continued to flourish and she is widely regarded to be one of the greatest female cricketers of all time.

An all-rounder, she was the first player to amass a combined 1,000 runs and 100 wickets in T20Is, she holds the record for the highest score by an Australian woman in Test matches (213 not out), and she was the third player to claim 150 wickets in women's ODIs. Her contribution to various successful teams at international and domestic level across cricket's primary formats has led to winning eight world championships with Australia, eleven WNCL championships with New South Wales, two WBBL titles with the Sydney Sixers, and one WPL title with Royal Challengers Bengaluru. She has also been recognised with numerous individual honours, such as winning the Rachael Heyhoe Flint Award and the Belinda Clark Award three times each, and being named as one of the Wisden Five Cricketers of the Decade: 2010–19.

Due to her on-field performance, off-field marketability and stature as "the ultimate role model", Perry is credited as a leading figure for the rising female presence in Australia's sporting culture.

== Early life ==
Perry was born at the Sydney Adventist Hospital and raised in the Hornsby Ku-ring-gai suburbs of Wahroonga and West Pymble, she attended Beecroft Primary School and Pymble Ladies' College. She was Sports, Athletics, and Cricket Captain at Pymble. During her school years, she played a range of sports beside cricket and soccer, such as tennis, athletics, touch football and golf. She became friends with future Australian teammate Alyssa Healy at the age of nine, and they played cricket together throughout childhood. Healy occasionally referred to her as "Dags" because of an ill-fitting uniform she wore at junior level, though Perry is more commonly known by the nickname "Pez".

Soon after turning 16, Perry played cricket for New South Wales in an under-19 interstate tournament in January 2007. In three matches, she scored 74 runs and took three wickets. A month later, she was selected in the Australian youth team for a tour of New Zealand, playing against the hosts' second XI. She scored 43 runs at 21.50 and took one wicket at 100.00.

== International cricket ==
=== 2007–08: Debut in all three formats ===
Perry was fast-tracked into the Australian team for a series in July 2007 against New Zealand, despite having never played a match at senior level. She made her One Day International debut in Darwin on 22 July at the age of 16 years and 8 months, becoming the youngest-ever cricketer to represent Australia. Taking two wickets for 37 runs from eight overs, her first scalp was Maria Fahey, whom she bowled for 11. Then, batting down the order at nine, she made 19 from 20 balls before Australia were all out for 174 to lose by 35 runs.

In her Twenty20 International debut at the Melbourne Cricket Ground against England on 1 February 2008, Perry "confirmed herself as a star for the future" through a "superb all-round performance" which included a late-innings knock of 29 not out from 25 balls before taking 4/20 off 4 overs to help Australia win by 21 runs. The display, which also featured a piece of fielding to execute a run out, sparked interest around Perry's potential to join revered players, such as Keith Miller, in Australia's exclusive and illustrious club of legendary all-rounders.

In the 2007–08 Women's Ashes match at Bradman Oval in Bowral on 15 February, Perry became the youngest-ever Australian Test cricketer, debuting at the age of 17 years and 3 months. The hosts batted first and collapsed to 5/59 on the first day, bringing Perry to the crease to join Kate Blackwell. Perry made 21 from 77 balls before being run out, ending the highest partnership of the innings. The next day, she claimed her first Test wicket, removing England opener Caroline Atkins for 15 and finishing with 2/49 from 23 overs. She made just six runs in the second innings and took one more wicket for the match as the visitors went on to win by six wickets.

=== 2009: First Cricket World Cup and World Twenty20 appearances ===
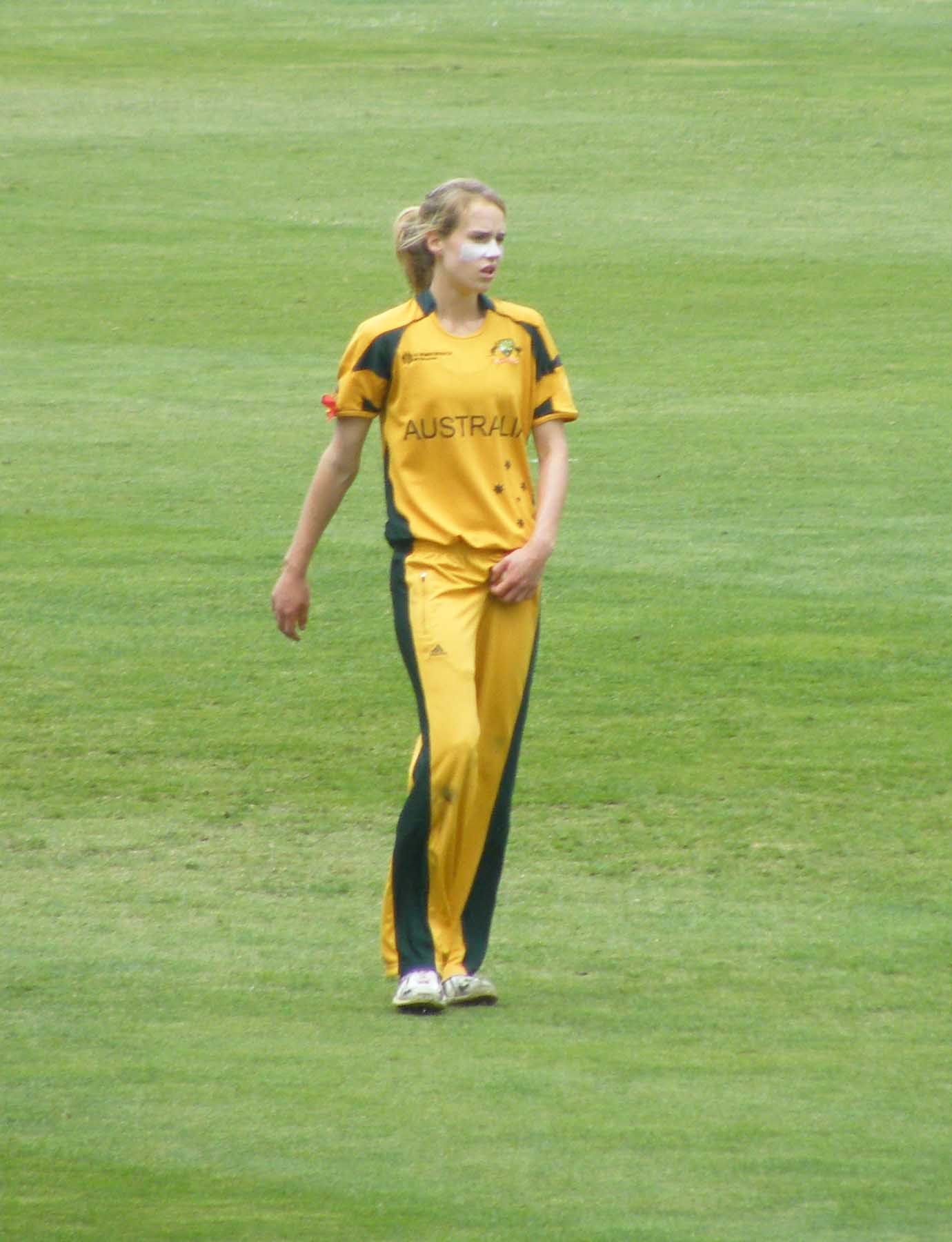
Perry at the 2009 Women's Cricket World Cup

Perry made her first appearance at a major ICC tournament via the 2009 Women's Cricket World Cup on home soil. Her most substantial contribution came in a 47-run win against the West Indies, scoring 36 and taking 2/28 from ten overs to earn Player of the Match honours. Australia did not place in the top two positions of the Super Six stage and therefore failed to qualify for the final.

Later that year, Perry was included in Australia's team for the inaugural Women's World Twenty20. They were defeated in the semi-finals by host nation England.

During the 2009–10 home summer, Perry enjoyed a highly effective Rose Bowl series against New Zealand, claiming 13 wickets at an average of 12.61 and taking her first five-wicket haul.

=== 2010: First World Twenty20 title ===
Perry played an integral part in Australia's triumphant 2010 World Twenty20 campaign in the West Indies. Against India in the semi-finals, she took 1/19 in the first innings. At the start of the 17th over, a 57-run partnership between Harmanpreet Kaur and Poonam Raut came to an end when Perry, off her own bowling, ran out Kaur. Two balls later, Indian captain Jhulan Goswami was run out by Alex Blackwell. Perry then had Raut out caught from the next delivery to fully turn the momentum of the match, with India losing 3/1 in the space of four balls. Australia went on to win by seven wickets with seven balls to spare.

In the final against New Zealand, defending a target of just 106, Perry dismissed Suzie Bates in the sixth over for 18. In the eighth over, she uprooted Amy Satterthwaite's off-stump with a ball that kept low, putting the Kiwis in trouble at 4/29. In the 18th over, Perry had Nicola Browne caught behind for 20 before returning to bowl the final over. Requiring five runs from the last delivery to win, Sophie Devine struck a powerful straight drive back down the pitch. Perry instinctively stuck out her right foot, deflecting the ball to a fielder at mid-on and preventing a boundary, securing a three-run victory and Australia's first T20 world championship title. Perry ended with bowling figures of 3/18 and was named Player of the Final. In a retrospective interview, teammate Alyssa Healy described Perry's match-saving play as "probably some of the more iconic footage we've seen over the last ten-to-fifteen years in the women's game".

=== 2011–12: Second-straight World Twenty20 title ===
In the only Test of the 2010–11 Women's Ashes, Perry claimed first innings bowling figures of 4/56, helping Australia in a seven-wicket victory to snatch the trophy out of English hands for the first time in six years.

At the 2012 World Twenty20 in Sri Lanka, Perry delivered a Player of the Match performance during a 28-run semi-final win against the West Indies, claiming crucial top-order wickets of Stafanie Taylor and Deandra Dottin to finish with figures of 2/19 off four overs. In the final, she managed to take 1/24 off four overs as Australia held on to win by four runs against England to claim a second-consecutive World T20 title.

=== 2013: Cricket World Cup success ===
The 2013 ICC Women's Cricket World Cup in India saw Perry miss three matches due to an ankle injury. In the final against the West Indies, after repeated unsuccessful attempts to make it through her delivery stride, she bowled her full allotment of ten overs and took 3/19 to help Australia win by 114 runs. The apparent pain through which Perry performed earned her the moniker of "Australia's limping hero" and garnered plaudits for showing unbreakable spirit through adversity. Days after winning her first 50-over world championship, Perry underwent surgery to repair a fractured ankle.

In the 2013–14 Women's Ashes, Perry was named Player of the Match in the only Test despite a 61-run victory going England's way. Top-scoring in both of Australia's innings with 71 and 31 while finishing with overall bowling figures of 8/79 from 42 overs, she "confirmed her status as a true all-rounder" in a see-sawing contest played amidst sweltering Perth temperatures of up to 44 degrees Celsius. Perry also excelled throughout the limited-overs fixtures, which included an unbeaten 90 off 95 to steer her team across the line by four wickets with three balls remaining in a one-dayer at Bellerive Oval. Due to the structure of the points system, England regained the Ashes, although Perry was nevertheless awarded Player of the Series.

=== 2014–15: Third-consecutive World Twenty20 title ===
At the 2014 World Twenty20 in Bangladesh, Perry was named Player of the Match against South Africa for scoring 41 not out off 29 balls in a six-wicket victory. Australia would go on to "coast" to a third-straight T20 world championship, defeating England in the final where Perry took 2/13 off four overs before making 31 not out and hitting the winning runs with six wickets in hand.

In the 2015 Women's Ashes, on English soil, Perry helped Australia regain the trophy with several outstanding performances which included bowling her team to victory on the last day of the only Test. She took 6/32 in the second innings and finished with overall match figures of 9/70 off 30 overs in the 161-run win. Leading both teams for runs scored and wickets taken across the seven-match schedule, Perry was once again named Player of the Series. In the match on 21 July, she passed the milestone of 1,000 runs in ODI cricket.

=== 2016–17: Individual dominance, team disappointment ===
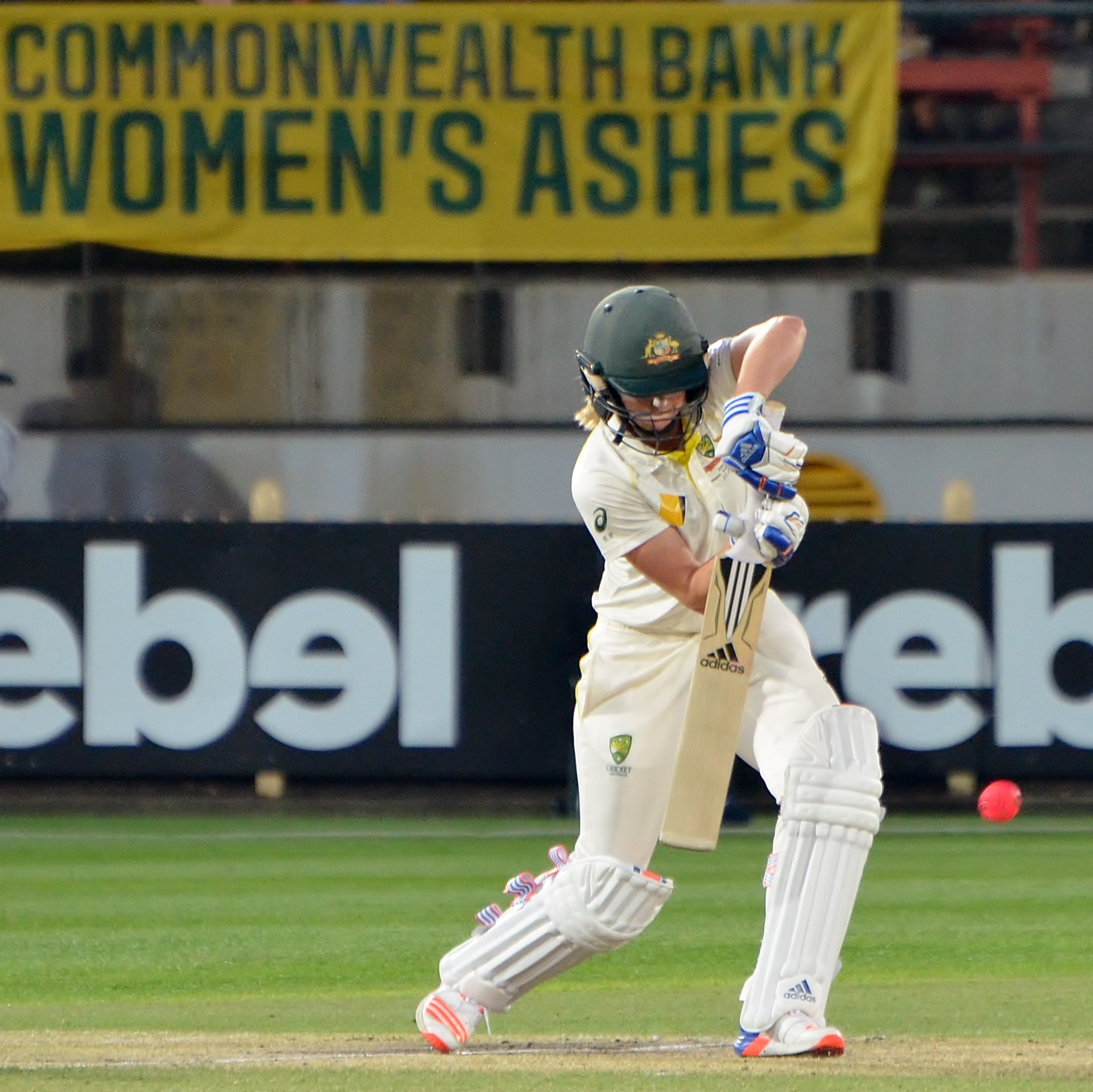
Perry during the 2017–18 Women's Ashes Test at North Sydney Oval

Australia suffered a shock upset loss in each of the 2016 World Twenty20 and 2017 Cricket World Cup tournaments at critical stages to be denied two major pieces of silverware. Perry, however, was experiencing a transcendent statistical period in her career, particularly evidenced through her batting in the ODI format of the game—in a 23-innings stretch, she made 17 scores of at least 50 runs at an average of 89.53.

The disparity between Perry's rich vein of form and the national team's underwhelming output was underlined during the 2017–18 Women's Ashes, especially in the day-night Test at North Sydney Oval when she played a historic innings of 213 not out while no other teammate managed to score more than 47. Her first international century, which set a new record for the highest score by an Australian in women's Tests, was not enough to carry the team to victory as the match ended in a draw. Likewise, the series ended with the two teams level on points, although this meant Australia would nevertheless successfully retain the Ashes.

=== 2018–19: Fourth World Twenty20 title ===
At the 2018 World Twenty20 in the Caribbean, Perry took the wickets of renowned danger players (such as Devine, Dottin and Nat Sciver) early in key matches on Australia's way to another tournament triumph. In the match against India on 17 November, she became the first cricketer for Australia to play in 100 Twenty20 Internationals. Then, in the final against England on 24 November, Perry became the first Australian to take 100 T20I wickets. She also manufactured a run out during the championship decider as Australia comfortably claimed the title in an eight-wicket win.

On 24 February 2019 at Karen Rolton Oval, Perry scored her maiden ODI century, striking an unbeaten 107 against New Zealand. The breakthrough ton ended her triple-figure drought in white-ball internationals, having reached the nineties on four occasions previously (ending up not out in three of those instances).

In July 2019, Perry pulled off another all-conquering Women's Ashes campaign. On 7 July at the St Lawrence Ground, she recorded the best bowling figures for an Australian in WODIs, finishing with seven wickets for 22 runs. Then on 19 July, in the first innings of the Test match at the County Ground, she set a new record for the most runs scored between dismissals in women's Test cricket with 329 runs. She also became the fourth woman to hit two consecutive Ashes Test centuries after Betty Wilson, Enid Bakewell and Claire Taylor. On 28 July, she became the first player to achieve the all-round feat of 1,000 runs and 100 wickets in T20Is. Perry was named Player of the Series in what was a comprehensive retention of the trophy for Australia.

After getting out for 116 in the first innings of the Ashes Test, Perry went on to face 432 balls in her next seven international cricket innings across all three formats, scoring 368 runs without being dismissed. On 11 September in a match against the West Indies, she became the third bowler to take 150 WODI wickets. In the same series, she recorded her second century, scoring 112 not out off 118 balls in hot and humid conditions.

=== 2020–21: Fifth T20 World Cup title ===
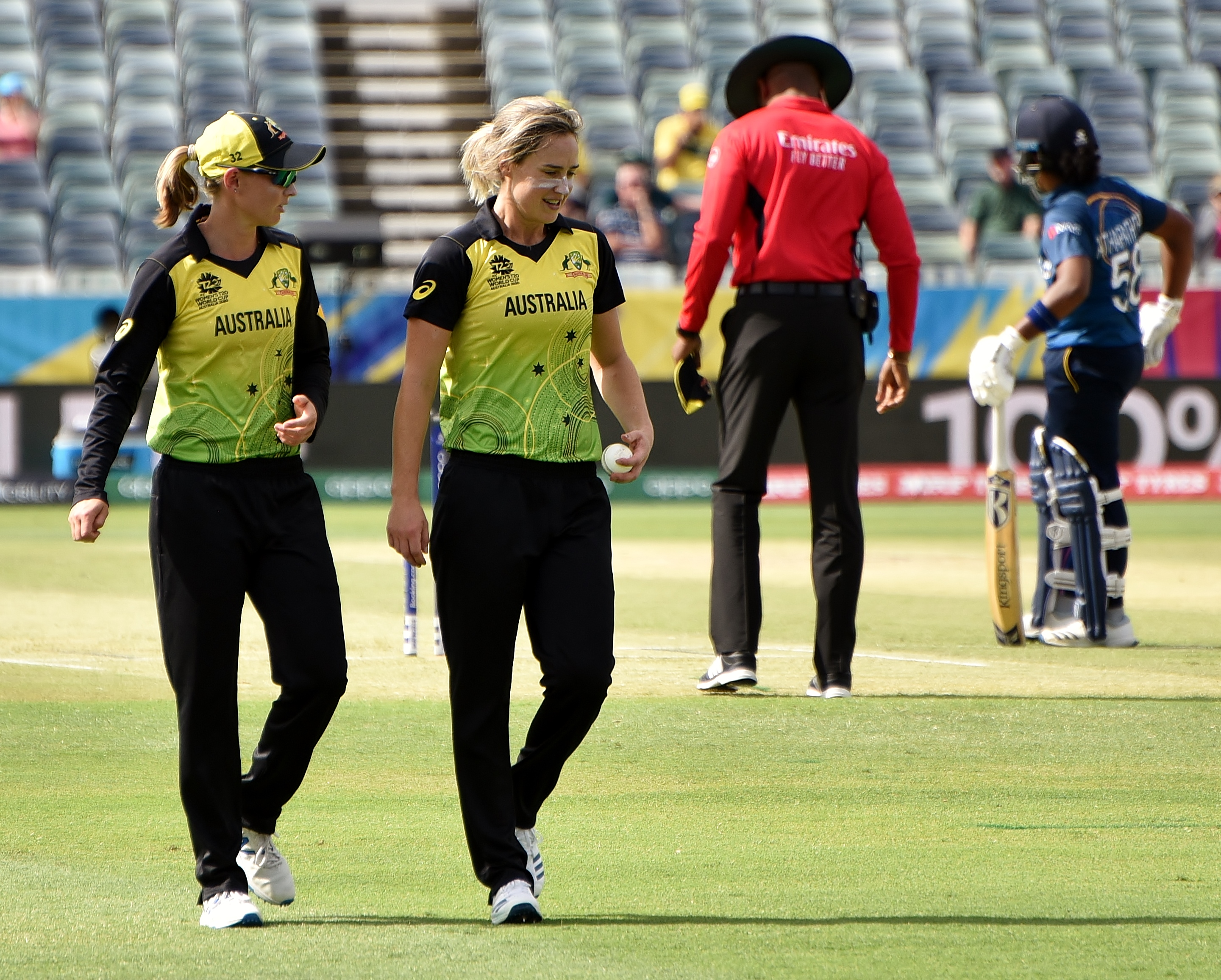
Perry (right) with Meg Lanning during the 2020 ICC Women's T20 World Cup at the WACA

In January 2020, Perry was named in Australia's squad for the 2020 T20 World Cup in Australia. On 2 March, coming into what was effectively a knockout quarter-final match against New Zealand at the Junction Oval under an injury cloud, she put on a valuable 32-run stand with Rachael Haynes late in the first innings. Australia held on to win by four runs, although Perry suffered a torn hamstring while fielding which would force her to miss the rest of the tournament. She stayed on with the team in a mentor role for the remaining matches as Australia went on to claim a fifth World T20 championship by beating India in the final at the MCG. In the post-match ceremony, despite her physical ailments, Perry was able to make it on stage to accept her medal as a playing member of the squad and partake in celebrations with the team alongside a performing Katy Perry—with whom she had featured heavily in promoting the tournament.

Perry underwent hamstring surgery in the following week, with recovery expected to take six months. In April, she was named as one of the Wisden Cricketers of the Year for her performances in 2019.

After being awarded another national contract in April, Perry was selected for the Australian squad ahead of New Zealand's tour in September. While training in Brisbane with the team in the lead-up to the series, she experienced a minor setback in her recovery from injury and was subsequently ruled out of the six T20I and ODI fixtures. Amidst media speculation around her future as an all-rounder, Perry said: "The only way I want to play cricket is as a batter and bowler. I don't think I'd offer enough as a batter to keep playing, and don't think I'd enjoy it, to be honest." Australian head coach Matthew Mott echoed those sentiments, stating Perry's contribution in both facets of the game was "absolutely instrumental" in the team's success.

In November 2020, Perry was nominated for the Rachael Heyhoe Flint Award for ICC Female Cricketer of the Decade, as well as the awards for women's ODI and T20I cricketer of the decade. The following month, she was announced as the winner of all three awards, recognising her "superlative performances with bat and ball in all three formats" for the period ranging from 1 January 2011 to 7 October 2020.

Perry returned to international cricket on 28 March 2021 in a T20I against New Zealand at Seddon Park, contributing a score of 23 not out from 16 balls in her country's six-wicket win. In October 2021, in the one-off Test match against India, she became the first woman to score 5,000 runs and take 300 wickets in international cricket. Days later in a T20I also against India, she became Australia's most capped women's international cricketer, appearing in her 252nd match.

=== 2022: Second Cricket World Cup title ===
At Manuka Oval, Perry took 3/57 and 1/28 as well as scoring 18 and 41 throughout the only Test of England's 2021–22 tour of Australia, which ended in a draw. She finished the match as the leading run-scorer and wicket-taker in Women's Ashes history, with 1,552 runs and 68 wickets respectively. A week later at the Junction Oval, in the second match of the series' ODI leg, Perry took 3/12 from seven overs to help bowl the tourists out for just 129. She then scored 40 in the run chase, earning Player of the Match honours in the five-wicket win.

After a third-consecutive retention of the Women's Ashes, the Australian team travelled to New Zealand for the 2022 Women's Cricket World Cup. In the group stage of the tournament, Perry claimed back-to-back Player of the Match awards. She scored 68 and put on a decisive 101-run partnership with Tahlia McGrath, before taking the wicket of Sophie Devine, in a 141-run victory against New Zealand. Then, Perry sliced through the West Indies top order with three early wickets, helping to set up a comfortable seven-wicket win. Towards the back end of the tournament, she suffered from back spasms and consequently missed two games, including the semi-final. Perry was deemed fit to play in the final against England, during which she scored 17 not out from ten deliveries in a 71-run victory.

In May 2022, Perry was named in Australia's team for the cricket tournament at the 2022 Commonwealth Games in Birmingham, England.

=== 2023: Sixth T20 World Cup title ===
Perry's biggest contribution with the bat during the 2023 ICC Women's T20 World Cup came in Australia's opening match, played against New Zealand at Boland Park. Her innings of 40 from 22 balls helped set up an emphatic 97-run win. She chipped in with the ball throughout the tournament to claim the wickets of key opponents (such as Chamari Atapattu and Laura Wolvaardt), and earned widespread praise for high-quality fielding under pressure late in her team's semi-final victory against India. Australia, and indeed Perry, would go on to become six-time T20 world champions with a 19-run defeat of South Africa in the final at Newlands Cricket Ground.

=== 2023: Ashes tour of England ===
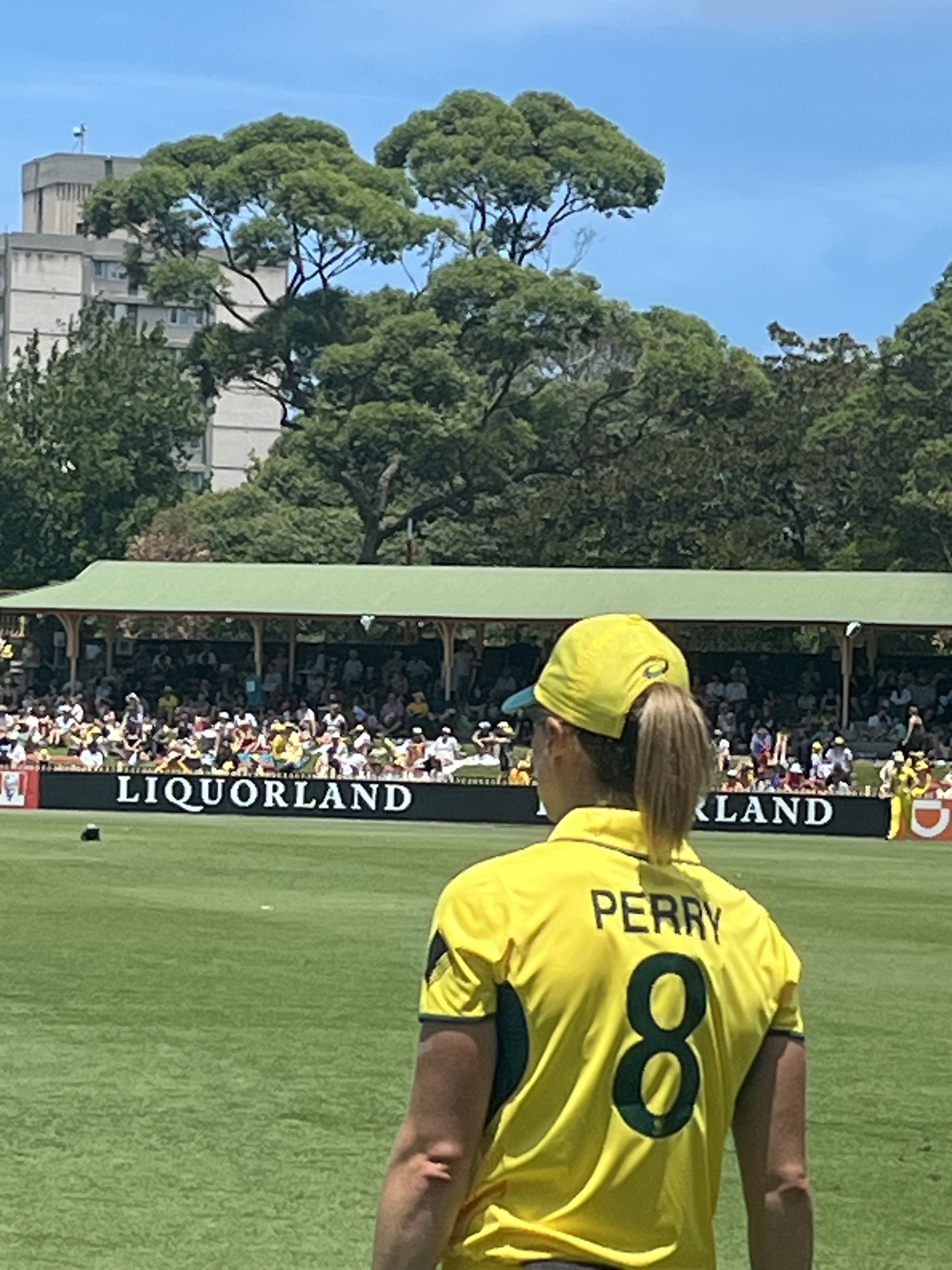
Perry fielding in her No. 8 shirt at North Sydney Oval during the 2024–25 Women's Ashes series

In March 2023, Perry was named for the 2023 Women's Ashes series. Batting at No.3 for the first time in Test cricket, Perry scored 99 in the first innings in the only test, followed with 25 in the second dig. Perry batted at No.5 and No.6 for the T20Is. She scored 51 (not out) in the 2nd T20I. Promoted to No.3 for the ODI series, Perry scored 41, 91 and 53 in the ODIs.

=== 2024: T20 World Cup ===
Perry was named in the Australia squad for the 2024 ICC Women's T20 World Cup.

=== 2024–25: Women's Ashes ===
Perry was named in the Australia squad for the 2025 Women's Ashes series. As of October 2025, she is batting at no.3 in the ICC women's world cup(ODI) as part of the Australian team.

== Domestic cricket ==
=== Women's National Cricket League ===
Perry made her debut for New South Wales in the Women's National Cricket League (WNCL) at the start of the 2007–08 season against South Australia, taking 2/29 from ten overs in a seven-wicket win. Her first WNCL scalp was Karen Rolton, rated the best batter in the world at the time. Perry ended her first season for New South Wales with 66 runs at 13.20 and nine wickets at 24.00 from seven matches. The final against South Australia was washed out without a ball bowled and New South Wales were awarded the title, having finished first in the round-robin phase.

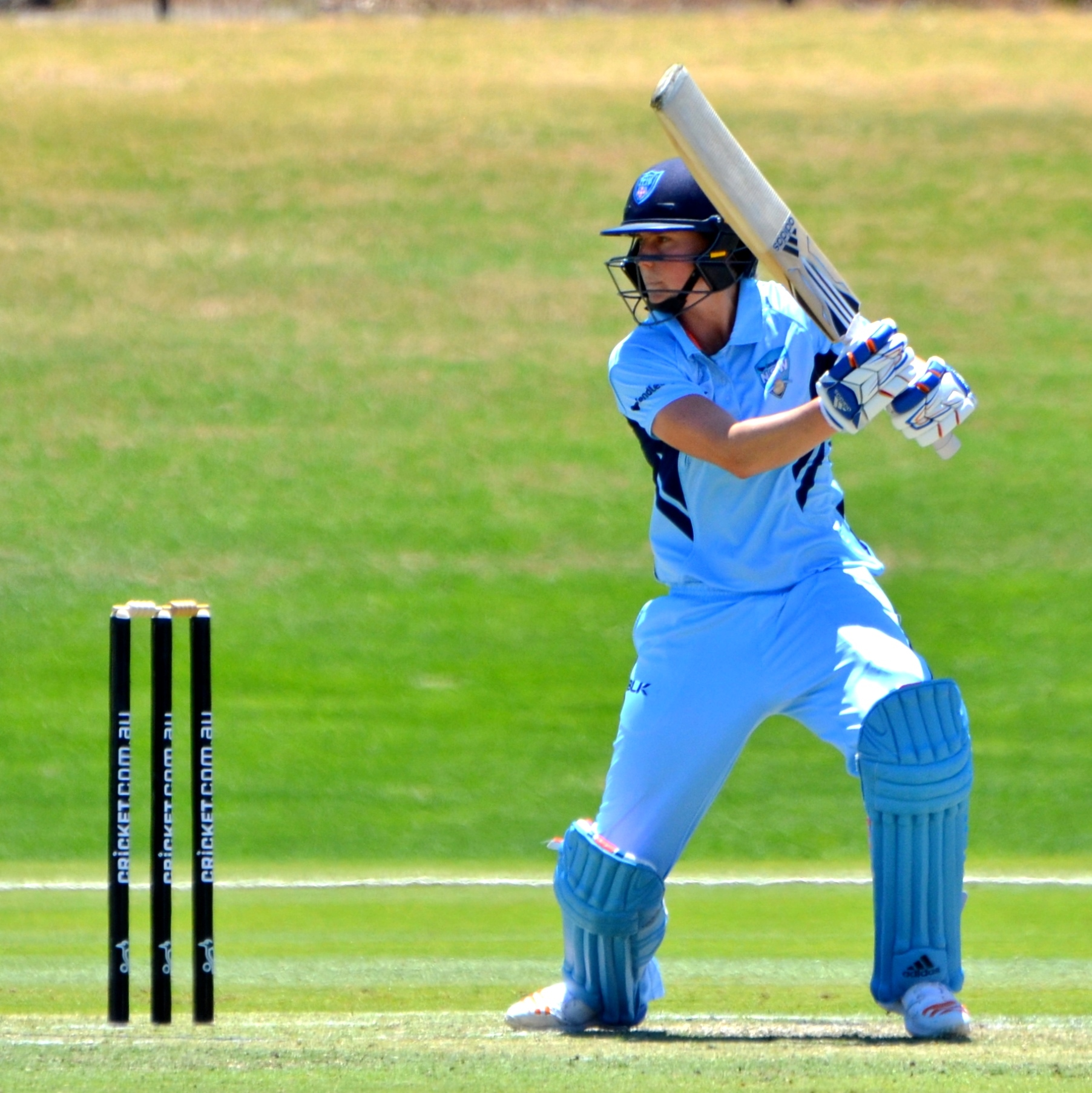
Perry on her way to 127* for the NSW Breakers against the ACT Meteors in 2017

Perry went on to win ten more WNCL championships with New South Wales. Her highlights during that period include:

- In the 2008–09 final, she took 4/23 in a Player of the Match performance to help New South Wales defend their title, defeating Victoria by six wickets.
- Across the 2009–10 season, Perry led the league for most wickets with 22 at an average of 10.63. On 7 November 2009, in a match against Queensland, she came into bat with New South Wales at 5/86 and went on to score 66, marking her first half-century, before taking 3/42 in a 15-run win. On 15 January 2010, Perry took her first five-wicket haul, finishing with 5/19 off eight overs to help bowl out South Australia for just 45.
- Across the 2010–11 season, Perry once again led the league for most wickets with 13 at an average of 9.23. On 30 January, she recorded her best bowling figures with New South Wales, finishing with 5/11 off nine overs against the ACT Meteors.
- In the 2014–15 final, she scored 57 not out off 50 balls before taking 2/19 from ten overs in a 144-run win.
- Across the 2015–16 season, Perry led the league for most runs with 403 at an average of 67.16. On 21 November, she recorded her first century, scoring 126 off 115 balls in a 120-run win against the ACT Meteors.
- On 29 October 2016, she recorded her second century, scoring 103 off 120 balls during a 107-run win against Western Australia in her only innings of the 2016–17 season.
- Across the 2017–18 season, Perry once again led the league for most runs with 372 at an average of 74.40. On 26 November, she recorded her highest score with New South Wales, making 127 not out off 120 balls in a 97-run win against the ACT Meteors.
- In the 2018–19 final, Perry played her 73rd and last game for New South Wales, scoring 31 to help defeat Queensland by 31 runs in what was her state's 20th WNCL title.

Deciding to relocate to Melbourne in 2019 following her husband's move to play Super Rugby for the Melbourne Rebels, Perry consequently signed with WNCL team Victoria. She made her debut on 7 January 2020 at the Junction Oval, making 24 runs and taking 1/20 from seven overs. Perry claimed figures of 3/17 in a two-run win (via the DLS method) against Tasmania on 23 January at the TCA Ground, earning her first Player of the Match award in Victorian colours.

In the absence of Meg Lanning, Perry captained Victoria for their opening two matches of the 2021–22 season. During the second match, played at the Junction Oval on 19 December, she recorded her first century for the team, scoring 120 from 94 balls despite a 27-run loss (via the DLS method) to New South Wales.

On 5 January 2023, Perry recorded a new WNCL high score in an 88-run win against New South Wales at the Junction Oval, making 147 from 125 balls before being run out. She scored another century two days later, finishing on 130 not out from 95 balls as Victoria pulled off a record run chase.

=== Women's Big Bash League ===
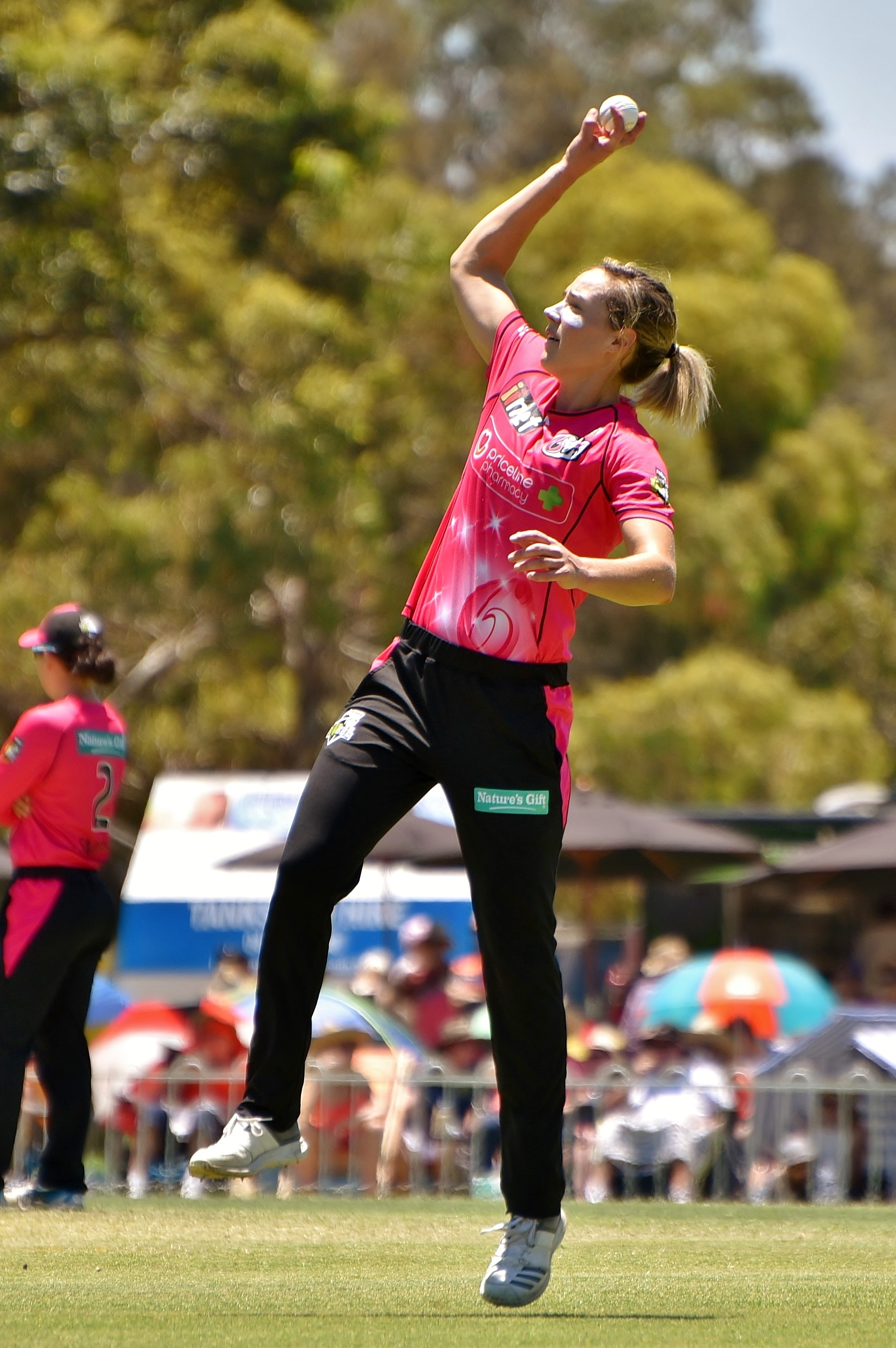
Perry playing for the Sydney Sixers in 2019

==== 2015–16 ====
At the official Women's Big Bash League (WBBL) launch on 10 July 2015, Perry was unveiled as the Sydney Sixers' first-ever player signing. She would also become the team's inaugural captain.

In the inaugural season, the Sixers lost their first six matches of the season. Perry promoted herself up the batting order to form what would become a successful long-term opening partnership with Alyssa Healy, and the Sixers turned their fortunes around to win the next nine matches. The winning streak would come to an end in the final on 24 January 2016 when the Sixers lost to the Sydney Thunder by three wickets.

==== 2016–2019 ====
The Sixers finished the regular season of WBBL|02 in first place, although Perry suffered a hamstring injury while batting against the Melbourne Renegades on 20 January 2017 which forced her to miss the playoffs. The Sixers would go on to beat the Perth Scorchers in the final, with Perry present in person to accept the team's maiden championship trophy.

Across WBBL|03, Perry led the league for most runs, scoring 552 at an average of 46.00. In the final on 4 February 2018, against the Scorchers again, she made 36 not out and hit the winning runs to secure the Sixers' second-consecutive title.

Perry had an extraordinary WBBL|04, leading the league for most runs, scoring a record 777 at an average of 86.33. She was recognised by commentators for taking her game to "another level", characterised by a marked increase in her strike rate to 121.21, up from 98.57 in the previous season. Her scoring potency manifested in two centuries—one in an epic run chase at North Sydney Oval against the Scorchers, the other via a late first innings onslaught against the Brisbane Heat at the SCG. She was named Player of the Tournament as the Sixers claimed a third-straight minor premiership. Perry was instrumental in a classic semi-final at Drummoyne Oval against the Renegades on 19 January 2019, which featured a thrilling last-ball run out to tie the game, scoring 54 not out and earning Player of the Match honours. In the resulting super over, she hit a six off the bowling of Molly Strano to send the Sixers into their fourth-consecutive championship decider. In the final against the Heat on 26 January, Perry again top-scored for her team but the Sixers fell just short of completing a three-peat when their total of 7/131 was chased down in the last over of the match.

==== 2019–present ====
The Sixers entered WBBL|05 as "hot favourites", but they lost five-straight games in the back-half of the tournament and missed out on qualifying for finals for the first time after Perry sustained a shoulder injury. Although she was sidelined for several matches, Perry still had another prolific season with the bat, scoring a team-high 469 runs at an average of 93.80 and earning her fifth Team of the Tournament selection. In a match against the Melbourne Stars on 3 November 2019 at the WACA, she batted through an entire innings with Alyssa Healy—the pair put on a 199-run stand, setting a new record for the highest domestic women's T20 partnership.

In April 2020, amidst media speculation regarding a move to one of the Melbourne-based WBBL teams, Perry announced she had activated an extension clause in her contract to remain with the Sixers for a further two seasons.

On 21 October 2022, Perry became the first player to captain 100 WBBL games. She was the competition's second-highest run-scorer throughout WBBL|08, as the Sixers finished the regular season on top of the points table and returned to the finals for the first time in four seasons. Her innings of 33 in the championship decider at North Sydney Oval was not enough to help secure victory, as her team suffered a ten-run defeat at the hands of the Adelaide Strikers. Adding insult to injury, the Sixers were deemed to be one over behind the over rate for the match, which triggered an automatic one-game suspension for Perry (to be served at the beginning of WBBL|09).

During the ongoing WBBL 11 season, she is playing for the Sydney Sixers but has been replaced by Ashleigh Gardner as captain.

=== Women's Cricket Super League ===
In April 2016, it was announced Perry would play for the Loughborough Lightning in the inaugural season of the Women's Cricket Super League in England. In the 2016 semi-final, she scored 64 not out off 48 balls in a five-wicket loss to the Western Storm. Perry returned for the Lightning the following season, earning Player of the Match honours in the team's only two wins.

=== Women's T20 Challenge ===
On 22 May 2018, Perry played for the Supernovas in the inaugural Women's T20 Challenge—an exhibition match in Mumbai serving as a potential precursor to a future female equivalent of the Indian Premier League. She took 2/20 off three overs then scored 13 not out in a final-ball victory.

With the Board of Control for Cricket in India adding another team for the 2019 edition, Perry had hoped to once again participate in the event. However, due to a breakdown in communications between Cricket Australia and the BCCI, all Australian players were excluded from the tournament. ESPNcricinfo reported this breakdown was part of a wider disagreement between the two boards that revolved around the BCCI's insistence on CA honouring a touring commitment to play a men's bi-lateral ODI series in India in January 2020. A disappointed Perry voiced support for her nation's board, although Cricket Australia would eventually issue a public apology to her and the other affected players for a mishandling of the situation.

In February 2020, Perry was reported to hold a strong desire to play in the competition's future instalments. However, she would miss the next opportunity later that year, with the BCCI electing to stage the T20 Challenge's third edition in a delayed calendar slot (due to the COVID-19 pandemic) which clashed with the timing of WBBL|06.

=== The Hundred ===
On 18 March 2021, the Birmingham Phoenix announced the signing of Perry for the inaugural season of the Hundred. However, she withdrew from the tournament two weeks before its commencement, citing personal reasons. In February 2022, the ECB confirmed the Phoenix had retained Perry for the 2022 season. Her debut, on 13 August against the Welsh Fire at Sophia Gardens, included a Player of the Match innings of 58 off 31 balls in a 19-run victory. She also played a key hand of 39 not out from 28 balls in an eight-wicket win over the Trent Rockets at Edgbaston, though the Phoenix would go on to fall just short of qualifying for the tournament's knockout stage.

Perry was again retained by the Phoenix ahead of the 2023 season. Perry is nominated as Captain for Birmingham Phoenix in 2024

=== Women's Premier League ===
In the inaugural season of the Women's Premier League (WPL) in 2023, Perry was bought by the Royal Challengers Bangalore at the price of ₹1.7 crore. Perry won the second season of the WPL with RCB and won the Orange Cap for the season with 347 runs.

== Playing style ==
In cricket, Perry is an all-rounder who bats right-handed and bowls right-arm pace. She is also a highly skilled fielder with safe hands and a strong throwing-arm. Perry's tall, athletic build paired with her speed across the ground makes her particularly adept at riding the boundary, and she is prone to creating "incredible" catches and run outs off her own bowling.

=== Bowling ===
Perry typically bowls at speeds ranging between 110 and 115 km/h, though she can reach up to 125 km/h which puts her near the fastest in the women's game. A natural outswing bowler, she is also able to move the ball into the right-handed batter through the air and off the pitch. With a "blonde ponytail swaying from side to side" and a "lovely, rhythmic action", her smooth run-up is the length of 18 casual paces and has been described as "a sight to behold". She is at her most effective when "crafting an intimidating spell in which her opponent is pinned down, pushed back and controlled by fastidious line and length" and "outfoxing the best in the business with careful planning and perfect execution". During her time at the Loughborough Lightning, she worked with coach Matthew Hoggard to make "some small technical" adjustments to her run-up and movement through the popping crease. Due to team balance, Perry tends to bowl less frequently when playing with the Sydney Sixers, delivering 80 fewer overs than teammate Marizanne Kapp across the first five WBBL seasons.

=== Batting ===
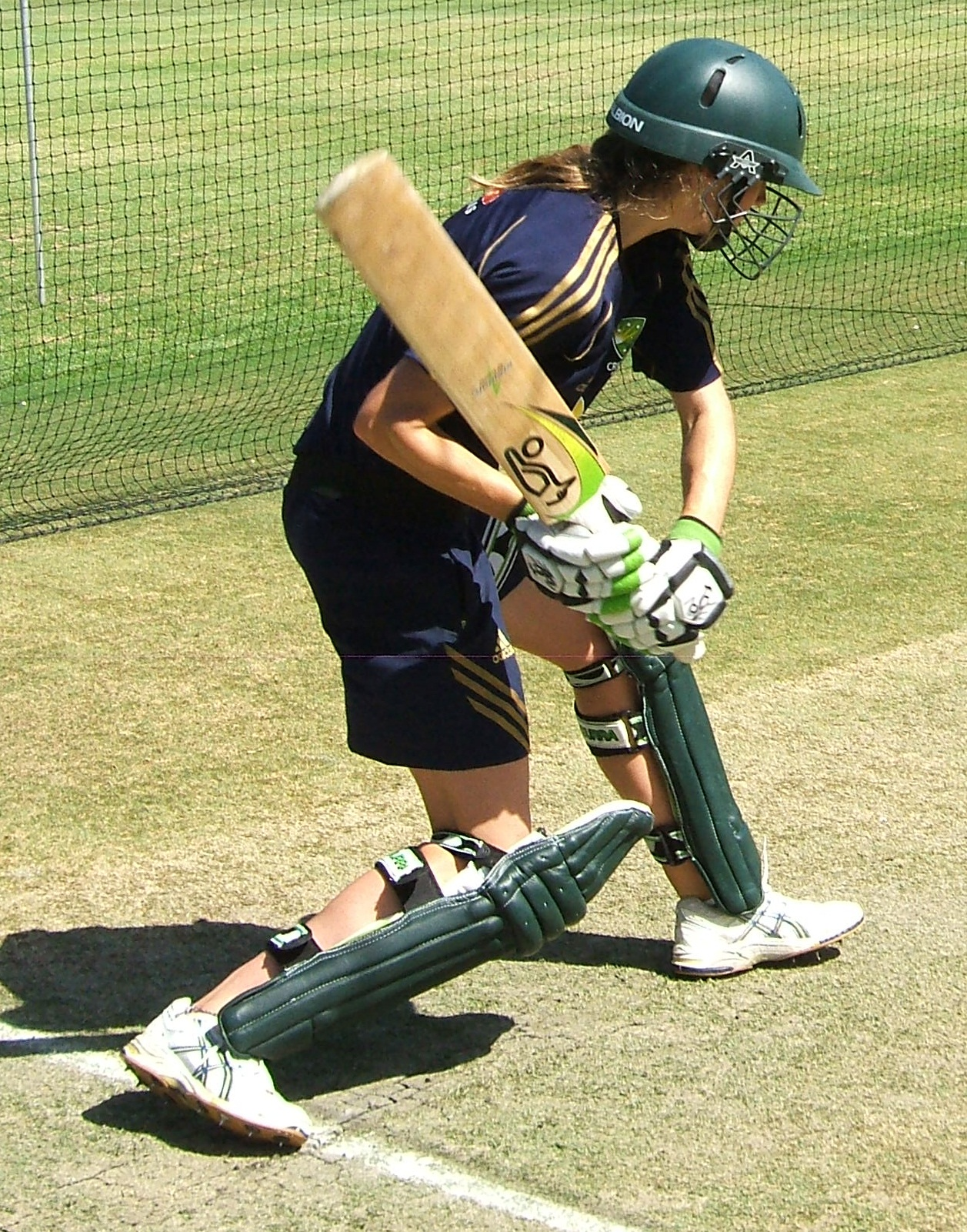
Perry during a training session

Perry is noted for her picturesque and technically correct batting style, generally preferring to play straight strokes down the ground. Her level-headed temperament under pressure is optimal for assuming the anchor role in an innings, in which she is usually more circumspect with her shot selection than her freely attacking batting partner. She has nevertheless gradually introduced a wider range of aggressive and unorthodox shots into her limited overs game, resulting in a marked increase to her strike rate. Despite being named Player of the Tournament in WBBL|04 as an opener, she remained in the middle-order for Australia's T20I team which prompted debate among commentators.

Because of her mental fortitude, physical fitness and fundamentally sound defence, Perry is arguably best suited for the rigorous nature of Test cricket rather than shorter formats of the game. She has expressed wishes for more Test matches to be played by women, having been presented with just eight opportunities to wear the baggy green in the initial 13 years of her international career—a "regrettable infrequency" or, as some writers have claimed, a "travesty".

When accelerating the run rate of an innings, Perry is renowned as an immensely powerful striker, having scored the third-most sixes across the first five WBBL seasons. During a match at North Sydney Oval on 9 December 2017, Perry hit a ball into the crowd which struck a 13-year-old boy in the face. She immediately rushed to the boundary to check on the boy's welfare and directed the on-field medics to his location. The boy, who was transported to hospital by ambulance for observation and later released, received a phone call from Perry the following morning. In another example of her literal destructive batting capabilities, Perry hit a six during a 13 November 2019 game in Launceston which smashed the windscreen of a nearby parked ambulance.

=== Traits and influences ===
Throughout her career, Perry has been known to spend frequent three-hour net sessions with her father, and personal coach, Mark. After moving to Melbourne, she predominantly relied on Victoria assistant coach Dulip Samaraweera to help maintain her lofty training standards. Former teammate and captain Lisa Sthalekar has described Perry as "the ultimate professional" and "meticulous" in her preparation, while Meg Lanning has called her a "perfectionist".

Despite achieving success as captain of the Sydney Sixers, Perry has never held the top on-field leadership position for the national team. After Jodie Fields stepped down from the job in 2014, Meg Lanning assumed the role, with Alex Blackwell and Rachael Haynes intermittently standing-in when required. In a 2019 interview with Daisy Pearce on 1116 SEN, Perry characterised herself as having a youthful and jovial persona within the Australian team, regardless of her experience and seniority. She attributed this phenomenon to having broken into the setup at such a young age.

In a quirk reminiscent of Michael Jordan's propensity to wear college basketball shorts underneath his NBA uniform, Perry has invariably worn a pair of New South Wales PSSA socks in top-level cricket matches throughout her career. Perry cites Michael Hussey as the cricketer she idolised most while growing up. Other players whom she considered among her favourites include Glenn McGrath, Steve Waugh, Michael Bevan, Belinda Clark and Karen Rolton.

== Statistics ==
Across all forms of international cricket, Perry has scored a total of 6,764 runs and taken 330 wickets during her 314-match career. In top-level domestic leagues, she has compiled 8,589 runs while claiming 251 wickets from 303 matches. The table below details Perry's key statistics for each major format and competition in which she has appeared. (Note: Does not include exhibition tournaments, such as the 2007–08 and 2008–09 editions of the Australian Women's Twenty20 Cup and the 2018 Women's T20 Challenge.)

Format/Competition	Mts	Batting							Bowling					Cts	Ref(s)
Format/Competition	Mts	Inns	NO	Runs	Ave	HS	100s	50s	Wkts	Conc	Ave	BBI	5WI	Cts	Ref(s)
Tests	13	22	7	928	61.86	213*	2	4	39	851	21.82	6/32	2	6	
One Day Internationals	147	120	42	3,958	50.74	112*	2	34	165	4,147	25.13	7/22	3	49	
Twenty20 Internationals	162	105	38	2,088	31.16	75	0	9	136	2,435	18.78	4/12	0	45	
Women's National Cricket League	93	72	19	2,766	52.19	147	8	13	124	2,614	21.08	5/11	2	36	
Australian Women's Twenty20 Cup	52	30	14	452	28.25	61	0	2	44	890	20.23	3/12	0	15	
Women's Big Bash League	134	121	33	4,689	48.84	103*	2	28	70	2,080	32.50	5/22	1	54	
Women's Cricket Super League	11	11	4	372	53.14	78*	0	3	8	224	28.00	2/9	0	3	
The Hundred	6	6	2	134	33.50	58	0	1	–	–	–	–	–	6	
Women's Premier League	17	17	6	600	54.55	67*	0	4	11	303	27.55	6/15	1	2	
Statistics correct as of 4 April 2024

== International centuries ==
As of July 2025 Perry has scored five centuries in international cricket, two in Test matches and three in One Day Internationals.

Test centuries
No	Runs	Against	Pos.	Inn.	Test	Venue	H/A	Date	Result	Ref
1	213 not out	England	4	2	1/1	North Sydney Oval	Home	9 November 2017	Drawn	
2	116	England	4	1	1/1	County Ground, Taunton	Away	18 July 2019	Drawn	

ODI centuries
No.	Runs	Against	Pos.	Inn.	S/R	Venue	H/A/N	Date	Result	Ref
1	107 not out	New Zealand	4	1	97.27	Karen Rolton Oval, Adelaide	Home	24 February 2019	Won	
2	112 not out	West Indies	3	1	94.91	Sir Vivian Richards Stadium, Antigua	Away	8 September 2019	Won	
3	105	India	3	1	140.00	Allan Border Field, Brisbane	Home	8 December 2024	Won	

== Soccer ==
Ellyse Perry
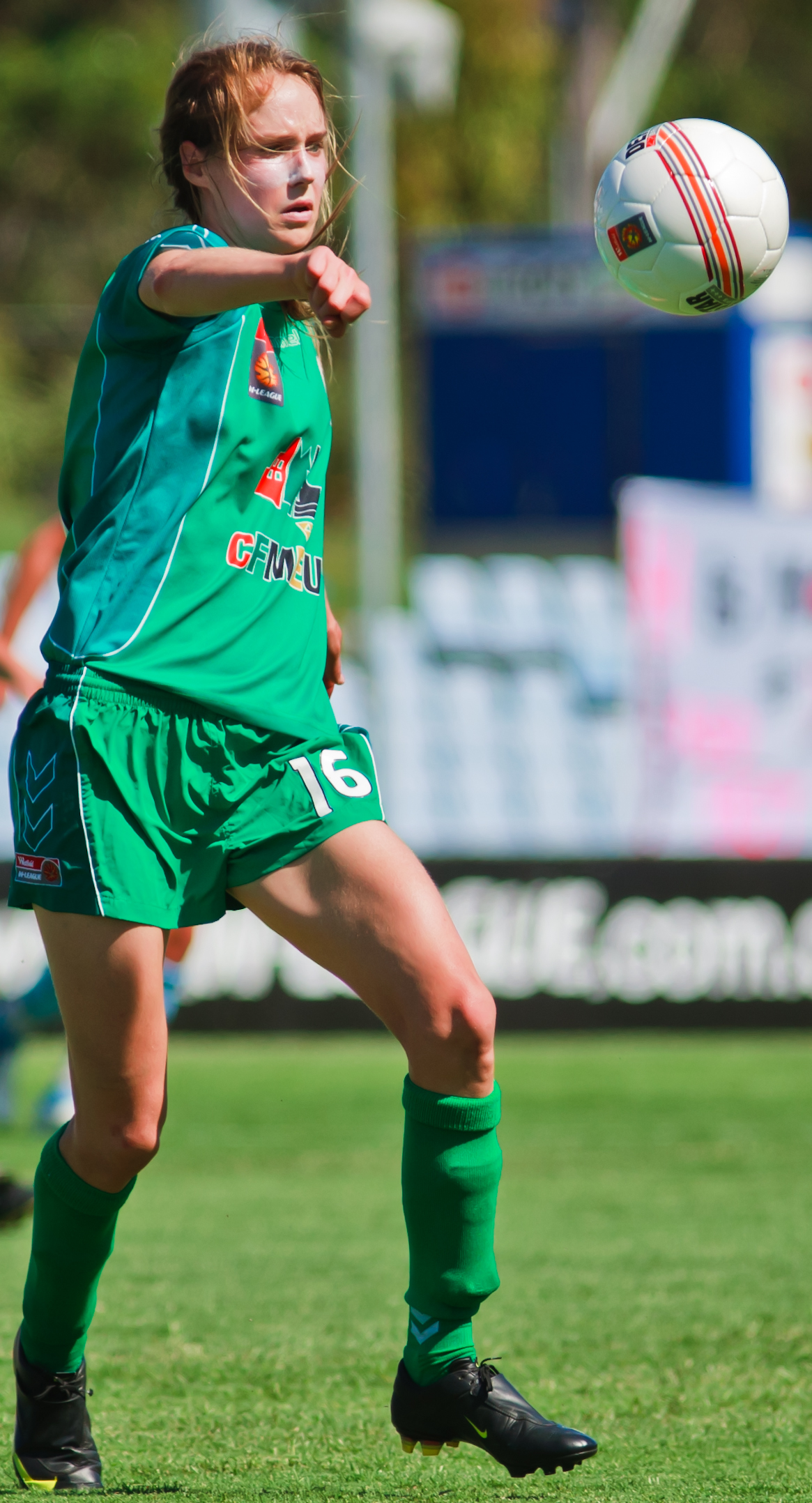
- Perry playing for Canberra United in 2009

Personal information
- Full name: Ellyse Alexandra Perry
- Date of birth: 3 November 1990 (age 36)
- Place of birth: Wahroonga, New South Wales, Australia
- Height: 1.76 m (5 ft 9 1/2 in)
- Position: Defender

Youth career
- 2008: NSW Sapphires

Senior career*
Years	Team	Apps	(Gls)
2008–2009	Central Coast Mariners	3	(0)
2009–2012	Canberra United	24	(2)
2012–2016	Sydney FC	18	(1)
Total		45	(3)

International career^{‡}
2007	Australia U-20	3	(0)
2007–2013	Australia	18	(3)
- * Club domestic league appearances and goals as of 13 September 2016 ‡ National team caps and goals as of 17 July 2011

Primarily a defender, Perry played her first match for the Australian national soccer team against Hong Kong at Hong Kong Stadium on 4 August 2007. She was 16 years and 9 months old at the time, having made her international cricket debut less than two weeks earlier, and scored a goal in the second minute of the match. Perry scored her second goal at international level in the 2008 AFC Women's Asian Cup in a match against South Korea.

Playing domestically for the Central Coast Mariners in the 2008–09 W-League season, Perry made her debut for the club against Queensland Roar on 15 November 2008. She began playing for Canberra United at the start of the 2009 W-League season, and went on to become the joint-recipient of the 2009 W-League Young Player of the Year award with Brisbane Roar's Elise Kellond-Knight. She also won three Canberra United awards for the season: the Players', Supporters' and overall Club Player of the Year.

Perry was selected for the Matildas squad for the 2011 FIFA Women's World Cup in Germany. In the group game against Norway, she came on as a late substitute, making her the first Australian to appear in both ICC and FIFA World Cups. Perry was in the starting line-up for the quarter-final against Sweden in which she scored Australia's only goal in the 3–1 loss.

In May 2012, Perry was given an ultimatum by Canberra United to either quit cricket or find another W-League club. She consequently signed with Sydney FC for the 2012–13 season. Perry was part of the Sydney FC squad that competed at the 2013 International Women's Club Championship, defeating NTV Beleza 1–0 but losing 3–2 to Chelsea.

Following a match on 16 November 2013 against Melbourne Victory, The Sunday Telegraph reported Perry's "fame and fortune" had spurred opponents to kick and punch her behind the play. After the game, she required six stitches for a leg wound caused by a late tackle from Lisa De Vanna. In a subsequent interview with the Australian Associated Press, De Vanna denied any jealousy or trouble concerning Perry: "There was no punching, there was no kicking, there was no sledging. The only incident that happened was a tackle and it wasn't the deliberate tackle that it's been made out to be."

== Soccer statistics ==
=== Club ===
As of match played 13 September 2016

Club	Season	League			Cup		Other		Total	
Club	Season	Division	Apps	Goals	Apps	Goals	Apps	Goals	Apps	Goals
Central Coast Mariners	2008–09	W-League	3	0	—		–		3	0
Canberra United	2009	W-League	9	1	—		1 (Note: Appearance in W-League Finals)	0	10	1
Canberra United	2010–11	W-League	8	1	–		–		8	1
Canberra United	2011–12	W-League	7	0	–		–		7	0
Canberra United	Total		27	2	–		1	0	28	2
Sydney	2012–13	W-League	6	1	—		3 (Note: One appearance in W-League Finals, Two appearances and one goal in International Women's Club Championship)	1	9	2
Sydney	2013–14	W-League	5	0	–		1 (Note: Appearance in W-League Finals)	0	6	0
Sydney	2014	W-League	2	0	–		–		2	0
Sydney	2015–16	W-League	5	0	–		–		5	0
Sydney	Total		18	1	–		4	1	22	2
Career total			45	3	–		5	1	50	4

=== International goals ===
Perry scored three international goals during her soccer career.

Scores and results list Australia's goal tally first.

No.	Date	Venue	Opponent	Score	Result	Competition	Ref
1	4 August 2007	Hong Kong Stadium, So Kon Po, Hong Kong	Hong Kong	1–0	8–1	2008 Olympics qualifying	
2	31 May 2008	Thống Nhất Stadium, Ho Chi Minh City, Vietnam	South Korea	1–0	2–0	2008 AFC Women's Asian Cup	
3	9 July 2011	Impuls Arena, Augsburg, Germany	Sweden	1–2	1–3	2011 FIFA Women's World Cup	

== Choice of sport ==
On 29 May 2012, The Age reported that Heather Reid, the chief executive of Canberra United FC, had given Perry an ultimatum to choose between soccer and cricket. On 5 September, Perry joined Sydney FC, with new coach Alen Stajcic stating he was prepared to accommodate her twin sporting careers. This arrangement came to a head in January 2013 when Sydney FC's W-League semi-final was scheduled for the same day as New South Wales' T20 Cup final. A few days later, The World Game revealed Perry's decision would be to play in the soccer semi-final. The following weekend, Perry declined to play for Sydney FC in the W-League grand final, opting instead to play for Australia in a warm-up game for the Cricket World Cup.

On 13 February 2014, The Sydney Morning Herald reported Perry had elected to play in a W-League semi-final ahead of the Women's National Cricket League final. In March, she was left out of a 23-player Matildas squad that was set to face Brazil in a two-match series. National team coach Hesterine de Reus confirmed Perry wouldn't be considered for the AFC Women's Asian Cup later in the year either: "When you play at the highest level you need to invest a lot of time to become a world-class player... We're always keeping an open mind for competition, but at this point she was not invited."

Perry played her last game in the W-League on 13 December 2015, a week after the launch of the Women's Big Bash League—Australia's new domestic Twenty20 cricket competition. She was named in Sydney FC's squad for the 2016 grand final but instead played a conflicting T20I match against India. In a 2018 interview with The Roar, Perry said her path to becoming a single-sport athlete occurred naturally: "Essentially, both sports have grown so much and developed so much in the last couple of years that they really demand people to be full-time professional athletes... I ended up in cricket and haven't played any football recently. I truly enjoyed my time playing football."

In 2023, after the Matildas had achieved the best-ever result of any senior level Australian soccer team by coming fourth in the 2023 FIFA Women's World Cup, Perry told ABC News that she still did not regret her decision to prefer cricket over soccer: "... from a personal perspective I had an amazing experience and opportunity to play two sports for a period of time before both had transitioned to full-time professional ..."

== Off the field ==
=== Personal life ===
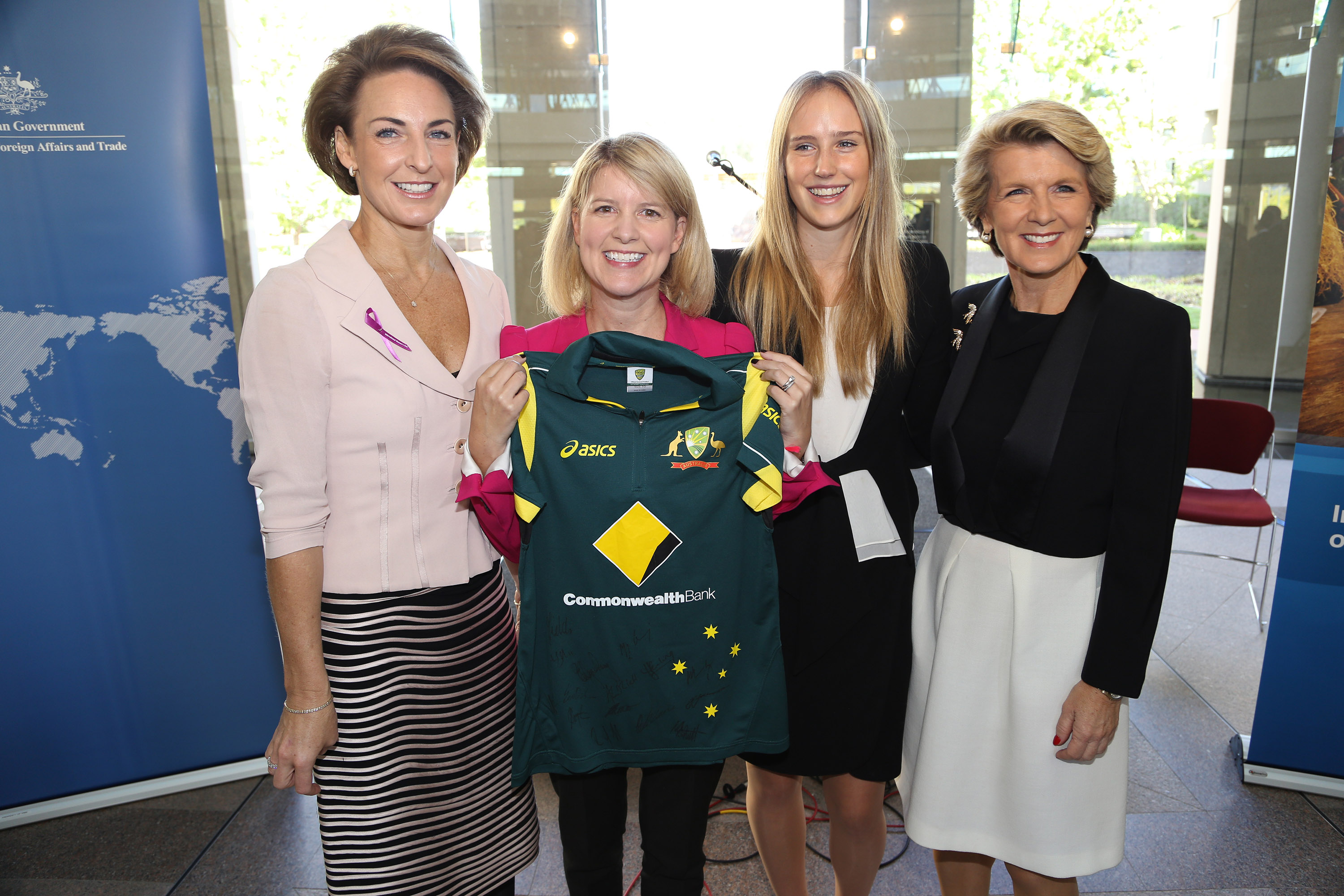
Perry poses for a photo next to the Minister for Foreign Affairs, Julie Bishop (right), after presenting an autographed Australian women's cricket team shirt to the Ambassador for Women & Girls, Natasha Stott Despoja (left).

After completing her HSC in 2008, Perry studied Economic and Social Sciences at the University of Sydney.

On 24 October 2013, Perry and Australian rugby union player Matt To'omua went public with their relationship by appearing together at the John Eales Medal ceremony. On 20 August 2014, the couple announced their engagement. They married on 20 December 2015. A self-described "coffee aficionado", Perry co-owned several cafés with her husband. The couple separated in 2020.

Perry's philanthropic causes include the McGrath Foundation, the Sporting Chance Cancer Foundation and the LBW (Learning for a Better World) Trust.

=== Media figure ===
Perry has been involved in various projects spanning several forms of media:

- In June 2010, she hosted the show Football Stars of Tomorrow which aired on One HD.
- In 2011, she was a recurring guest on the Triple J radio breakfast show with Tom Ballard and Alex Dyson to present her segment Perry Good Sportswoman.
- In 2016, Perry wrote a series of children's books with Sherryl Clark which followed a young sport-loving girl transitioning from Primary School to High School.
- In August 2018, Fox Sports signed her to the Fox Cricket broadcast team.
- On 20 October 2019, she featured as a guest panellist in the first episode of The Blast—a Sunday night prime-time show on Fox Cricket dedicated to discussing the women's game.
- On 4 November 2019, her first non-fiction book was released through HarperCollins, titled Perspective.
- On 27 November 2019, Facebook Watch premiered a seven-part short-form documentary series, titled Insight, intended to provide a behind-the-scenes glimpse into Perry's life.
- In December 2019, Perry and her teammates were the subjects in a reprise of "C'mon Aussie C'mon". The lyrics of the iconic cricket anthem, which were reworked to reflect the Australian women's team, described Perry's skills as "kind of scary". She featured prominently in an accompanying television commercial for the Commonwealth Bank.

=== Endorsements ===
Perry is "a very private person", according to her former NSW and Australian captain and teammate Alex Blackwell. However, Perry herself has estimated that, up until 2017, she spent an almost-even amount of time between "training, touring and playing" versus "sponsorship and promotional work".

The number of hours Perry had to commit to the latter would dramatically decrease after Cricket Australia announced a landmark pay deal for its elite female athletes—an evolution Perry said she was "stoked" about: "There is something incredibly tiresome about walking into a studio and trying to pretend like you know what you're doing in front of a camera."

In 2013, Perry was ranked by SportsPro magazine as the 36th most marketable sportsperson in the world, and the most marketable Australian athlete. She has fronted campaigns for Jockey, Hisense and Weet-Bix while also taking on ambassadorial roles with Red Bull, Microsoft, and Hublot. Her current corporate partners include L'Oréal, Adidas, Fox Sports and Commonwealth Bank.

In 2022, Perry collaborated with Sydney-based manufacturer JPGavan to release a new range of gear, aimed at making "cricket equipment accessible to everyone playing the game". The Perry-endorsed gear, marketed under the name 'Staple', is targeted in particular at female players. Perry later confirmed on social media that her partnership with Adidas would continue, despite her switch to a different cricket supplier.

== Honours ==
=== Cricket ===
==== Team ====
Australia

- ICC Cricket World Cup (2): 2013, 2022
- ICC Women's T20 World Cup (6): 2010, 2012, 2014, 2018, 2020, 2023
- Commonwealth Games gold medal: 2022

New South Wales

- Women's National Cricket League (11): 2007–08, 2008–09, 2009–10, 2010–11, 2011–12, 2012–13, 2013–14, 2014–15, 2016–17, 2017–18, 2018–19
- Australian Women's Twenty20 Cup (2): 2012–13, 2014–15

Sydney Sixers

- Women's Big Bash League (2): 2016–17, 2017–18

Royal Challengers Bengaluru

- Women's Premier League: 2024

==== Individual ====
- Rachael Heyhoe Flint Award (2): 2017, 2019
- ICC Women's Cricketer of the Decade: 2011–2020
- ICC Women's ODI Cricketer of the Year: 2019
- ICC Women's ODI Cricketer of the Decade: 2011–2020
- ICC Women's T20I Cricketer of the Decade: 2011–2020
- Wisden Leading Woman Cricketer in the World (2): 2016, 2019
- ICC Women's World Twenty20 Player of the Final: 2010
- Women's Ashes Player of the Series (3): 2013–14, 2015, 2019
- Belinda Clark Award (3): 2016, 2018, 2020
- One of the five Wisden Cricketers of the Year: 2020
- Women's National Cricket League Player of the Tournament: 2015–16
- Women's National Cricket League Player of the Final: 2008–09
- Women's Big Bash League Player of the Tournament: 2018–19
- Belinda Clark Medal (Note: Awarded to the New South Wales Breakers Player of the WNCL Season. Not to be confused with the Belinda Clark Award.) (3): 2015–16, 2017–18, 2018–19
- Cricket NSW Rising Star: 2007–08
- Sydney Sixers Player of the Season (3): 2017–18, 2018–19, 2023–24
- Sport NSW Athlete of the Year: 2019
- Australia Post Legend of Cricket: 2021
- Women's Premier League Orange Cap: 2024
- Women's Big Bash League Player of the Tournament: 2024–25

=== Soccer ===
==== Team ====
- W-League premiership: 2011–12

==== Individual ====
- W-League Young Player of the Year: 2009
- Canberra United Player of the Year: 2009

== Books ==
=== Non-fiction ===
- Perspective (Sydney: HarperCollins, 2019; ISBN 9781460758083)

=== Children's books ===
- Pocket Rocket (with Sherryl Clark) Ellyse Perry series, no. 1 (North Sydney: Penguin Random House Australia, 2016; ISBN 9780143781240)
- Magic Feet (with Sherryl Clark) Ellyse Perry series, no. 2 (North Sydney: Penguin Random House Australia, 2016; ISBN 9780143781264)
- Winning Touch (with Sherryl Clark) Ellyse Perry series, no. 3 (North Sydney: Penguin Random House Australia, 2017; ISBN 9780143781288)
- Double Time (with Sherryl Clark) Ellyse Perry series, no. 4 (North Sydney: Penguin Random House Australia, 2017; ISBN 9780143781301)

== Notes ==
Preceded by (Cricket West Indies) Stafanie Taylor (India) Smriti Mandhana	Rachael Heyhoe Flint Award; 2017; 2019–2020	Succeeded by (India) Smriti Mandhana (India) Smriti Mandhana
