= Taryn Rockall =

Australian soccer player

Personal information
- Full name: Taryn Rockall
- Date of birth: 11 November 1977 (age 48)
- Place of birth: Australia
- Position: Midfielder

Team information
- Current team: Central Coast Mariners
- Number: 14

Senior career*
Years	Team	Apps	(Gls)
1996–98	NSWIS		
1998–99	Arsenal		
1999–2004	NSW Sapphires	56	(17)
2008–09	Central Coast Mariners	2	(0)

International career
2001–03	Australia	11	(0)
- * Club domestic league appearances and goals

Taryn Rockall (born 11 November 1977) is an Australian soccer player. She played for the NSW Sapphires in the Women's National Soccer League (WNSL), Arsenal in the FA Women's Premier League and later for the Central Coast Mariners in the Australian W-League during the 2008–09 season. She won the Julie Dolan Medal twice, in 2001–02 and 2004–05, as best player in the WNSL.

== Club career ==
During the 1998–99 season, Rockall was a member of the Arsenal team that won the FA Women's League Cup/Women's FA Cup double.

Rockall made her debut for Central Coast Mariners in the W-League against Melbourne Victory on Saturday, 25 October 2008 after being substituted on for teammate Teresa Polias.

== International career ==
Rockall made her debut for Australia against France in January 2001. She was a member of the Australian team who won the 2003 OFC Women's Championship. Rockall was a member of the Australia team at the 2003 FIFA Women's World Cup.

== Honours ==
=== Club ===
NSWIS/NSW Sapphires

- Women's National Soccer League Championship: 1997–98, 1999–2000, 2003–04

Arsenal

- FA Women's League Cup: 1998–99
- Women's FA Cup: 1998–99

=== International ===
Australia

- OFC Women's Championship: 2003

=== Individual ===
Awards

- Julie Dolan Medal: 2001–02, 2004–05

Performances

- WNSL leading goalscorer: 2000–01
