= Rachael Doyle =

Australian football player

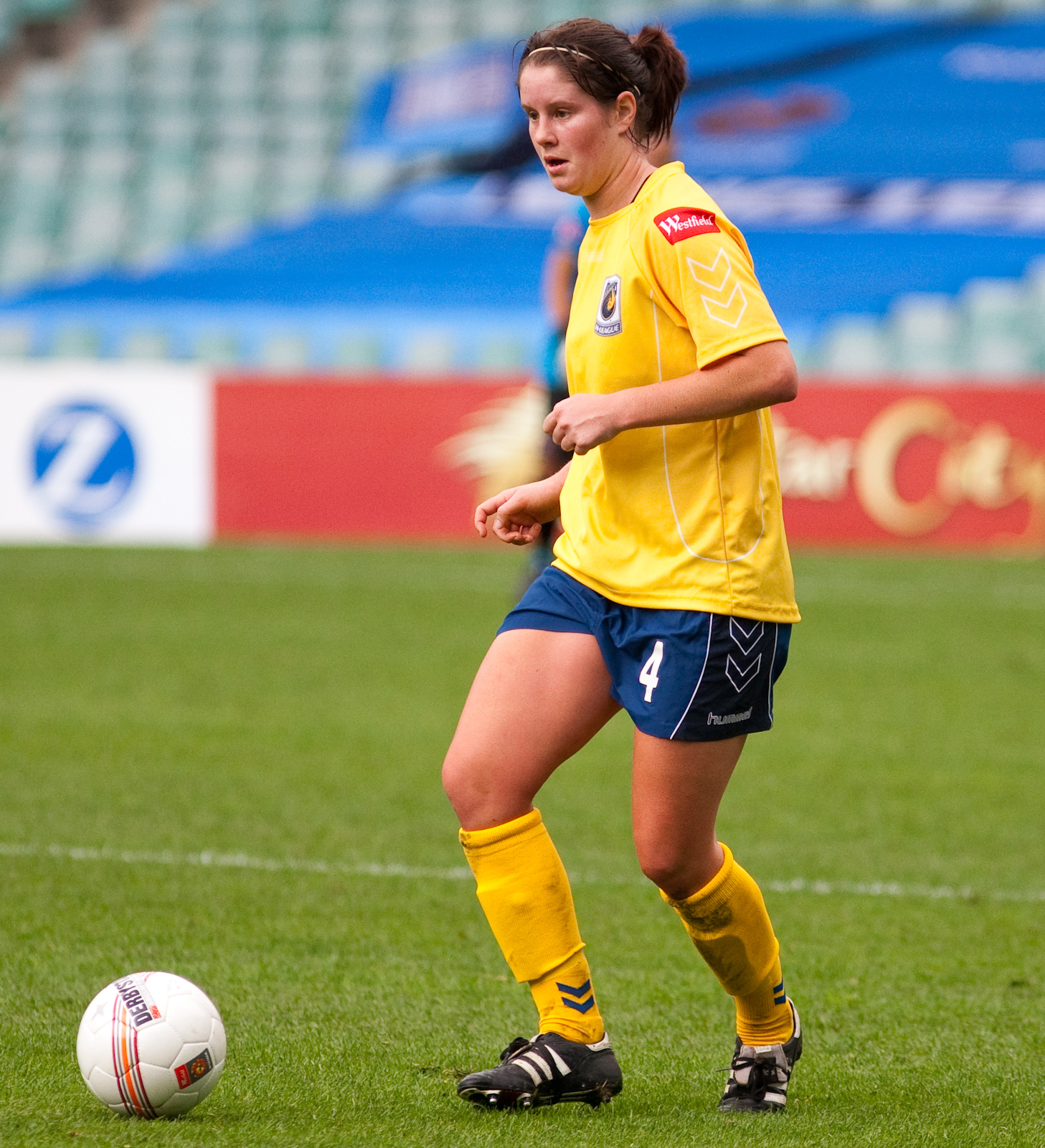

Personal information
- Full name: Rachael Doyle
- Date of birth: 26 October 1989 (age 37)
- Place of birth: St Leonards, Australia
- Height: 1.73 m (5 ft 8 in)
- Position: Defender

College career
Years	Team	Apps	(Gls)
2010–2013	Washington State Cougars	79	(5)

Senior career*
Years	Team	Apps	(Gls)
2008–2010	Central Coast Mariners	21	(0)

International career
2007	Australia	1	(0)

Managerial career
- 2016–2017: Eastern Kentucky Colonels (assistant)
- 2018–2019: Hawaii Rainbow Wahine (assistant)
- 2020–2024: Oregon Ducks (assistant)
- 2025–: Wyoming Cowgirls (assistant)
- * Club domestic league appearances and goals

Rachael Doyle-Guetlein (née Doyle; born 26 October 1989) is an Australian football (soccer) player who last played for Central Coast Mariners in the Australian W-League.

Doyle made her debut against Melbourne Victory on 25 October 2008.
