= Lyndsay Kohlet =

Australian soccer player

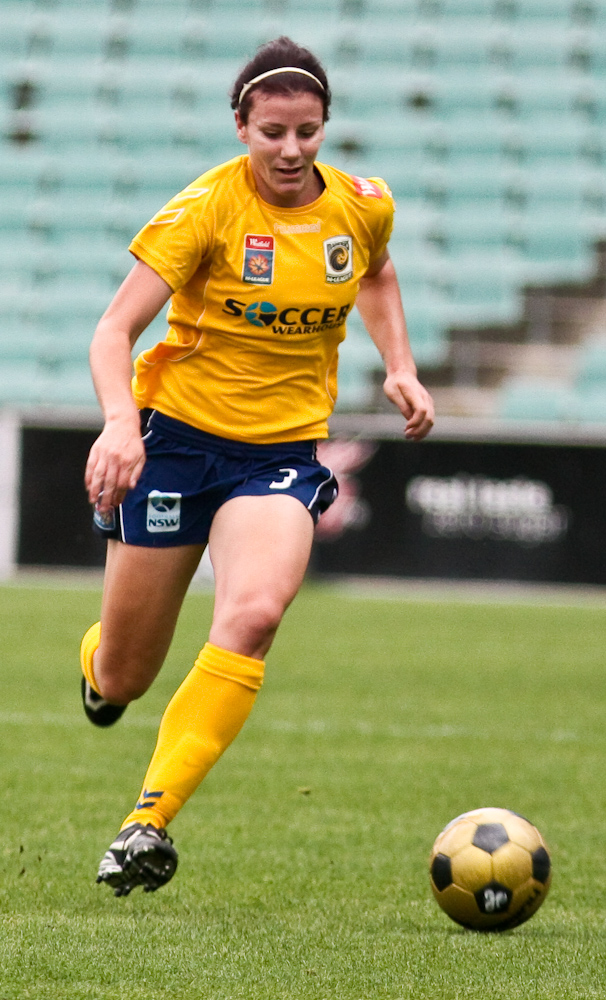
- Kohlet playing for Central Coast Mariners in 2008

Personal information
- Full name: Lyndsay Kohlet
- Date of birth: 6 October 1988 (age 38)
- Place of birth: Australia
- Position: Defender

Senior career*
Years	Team	Apps	(Gls)
2008–2009	Central Coast Mariners	10	(0)
2010–2011	Canberra United	4	(0)
2015–2016	Sydney FC	2	(0)

International career^{‡}
2007–	Australia	5	(0)
- * Club domestic league appearances and goals as of 9 March 2016 ‡ National team caps and goals as of 9 November 2015

Lyndsay Kohlet (formerly Glohe; born 6 October 1988) is an Australian soccer player who last played for Sydney FC in the Australian W-League.

Kohlet grew up in Orange, New South Wales, attending Orange High School.

She was a member of the NSW Sapphires White squad at the 2005 Women's National Football Championships.

Kohlet made her debut against Melbourne Victory on 25 October 2008. Kohlet played under the surname Glohe during spells at Central Coast Mariners and Canberra United.

== Honours ==
=== International ===
Australia

- AFF Women's Championship: 2008
