= Portugal at the 2008 Summer Olympics =

- IOC code: POR
- NOC: Olympic Committee of Portugal
- Website: www.comiteolimpicoportugal.pt (in Portuguese)

in Beijing
- Competitors: 77 in 16 sports
- Flag bearers: Nelson Évora (opening); Vanessa Fernandes (closing)
- Medals Ranked 46th: Gold 1 Silver 1 Bronze 0 Total 2

Summer Olympics appearances (overview)
- 1912; 1920; 1924; 1928; 1932; 1936; 1948; 1952; 1956; 1960; 1964; 1968; 1972; 1976; 1980; 1984; 1988; 1992; 1996; 2000; 2004; 2008; 2012; 2016; 2020; 2024; 2028

Portugal competed at the 2008 Summer Olympics in Beijing, People's Republic of China. It was the nation's twenty-second consecutive appearance at the Olympics. The Olympic Committee of Portugal was represented by a delegation of 129 people, of which 77 were competitors participating in 16 sports. Nelson Évora, the 2007 triple jump world champion, was chosen as the flag bearer during the opening ceremony; he won the triple jump event, giving Portugal its fourth ever Olympic gold medal.

== Medalists ==
Medal	Name	Sport	Event
Gold	Nelson Évora	Athletics	Men's triple jump
Silver	Vanessa Fernandes	Triathlon	Women's triathlon

== Archery ==
A single male archer secured qualification by winning the individual competition at the Final World Qualification Tournament, in Boé, France.

Athlete	Event	Ranking round		Round of 64	Round of 32	Round of 16	Quarterfinals	Semifinals	Final / BM	
Athlete	Event	Score	Seed	Opposition Score	Opposition Score	Opposition Score	Opposition Score	Opposition Score	Opposition Score	Rank
Nuno Pombo	Men's individual	650	42	Ergin (TUR); L 103–106	Did not advance					

== Athletics ==
As in previous editions, the Portuguese Olympic team's biggest share of competitors will compete in athletics events. Twenty-seven athletes (13 men and 14 women) will perform in a wide range of track and field disciplines, including the long-distance events, where Portugal holds its best record, but also the more technical events, where national athletes have achieved international-level results in the build-up to the Beijing Games.

Notable male athletes include the 2004 Olympic 100 metres silver medalist, Francis Obikwelu, and the 2007 triple jump world champion, Nelson Évora. Susana Feitor—bronze in the 20 km walk at the 2005 World Championships—and Naide Gomes—2008 world and 2007 European indoor long jump champion—are featured among the women's contingent.

Key

- Note–Ranks given for track events are within the athlete's heat only
- Q = Qualified for the next round
- q = Qualified for the next round as a fastest loser or, in field events, by position without achieving the qualifying target
- NR = National record
- N/A = Round not applicable for the event
- Bye = Athlete not required to compete in round

Men
Track & road events

Athlete	Event	Heat		Quarterfinal		Semifinal		Final	
Athlete	Event	Result	Rank	Result	Rank	Result	Rank	Result	Rank
Arnaldo Abrantes	200 m	21.46	8	Did not advance					
Augusto Cardoso	50 km walk	—N/a						4:09:00	40
Paulo Gomes	Marathon	—N/a						2:18:15	30
Edivaldo Monteiro	400 m hurdles	49.89	6	—N/a		Did not advance			
Francis Obikwelu	100 m	10.25	1 Q	10.09	3 Q	10.10	6	Did not advance	
Hélder Ornelas	Marathon	—N/a						2:23:20	46
Alberto Paulo	3000 m steeplechase	8:39.11	11	—N/a				Did not advance	
António Pereira	50 km walk	—N/a						3:48:12 NR	11
Rui Pedro Silva	10000 m	—N/a						29:09.03	34
João Vieira	20 km walk	—N/a						1:25:05	32
Sérgio Vieira	20 km walk	—N/a						1:29:51	45

Field events

Athlete	Event	Qualification		Final	
Athlete	Event	Distance	Position	Distance	Position
Nelson Évora	Triple jump	17.34	2 Q	17.67	1st place, gold medalist(s)
Marco Fortes	Shot put	18.05	38	Did not advance	

Women
Track & road events

Athlete	Event	Heat		Semifinal		Final	
Athlete	Event	Result	Rank	Result	Rank	Result	Rank
Jéssica Augusto	3000 m steeplechase	9:30.23	5	—N/a		Did not advance	
Jéssica Augusto	5000 m	16:05.71	14	—N/a		Did not advance	
Marisa Barros	Marathon	—N/a				2:34:08	32
Ana Cabecinha	20 km walk	—N/a				1:27:45 NR	8
Clarisse Cruz	3000 m steeplechase	9:49.45	15	—N/a		Did not advance	
Ana Dias	Marathon	—N/a				2:36:25	46
Susana Feitor	20 km walk	—N/a				DNF	
Inês Monteiro	Marathon	—N/a				DNF	
Sara Moreira	3000 m steeplechase	9:34.39	10	—N/a		Did not advance	
Vera Santos	20 km walk	—N/a				1:28:14	10
María do Carmo Tavares	800 m	2:01.91	6	Did not advance			

Field events

Athlete	Event	Qualification		Final	
Athlete	Event	Distance	Position	Distance	Position
Sílvia Cruz	Javelin throw	57.06	24	Did not advance	
Naide Gomes	Long jump	6.29	32	Did not advance	
Vânia Silva	Hammer throw	59.42	46	Did not advance	
Sandra-Helena Tavares	Pole vault	4.30	19	Did not advance	

== Badminton ==
Marco Vasconcelos qualified for his third consecutive Olympic Games in virtue of a 64th place in the Badminton World Federation (BWF) men's ranking list, which allowed him to be the 32nd qualified player in a total of 41 individual players. For the first time, women's national badminton will be represented at the Olympics, thanks to the 59th place of Ana Moura in the BWF women's ranking, which converted her in the 31st qualified player from a total of 47 individual players.

Athlete	Event	Round of 64	Round of 32	Round of 16	Quarterfinal	Semifinal	Final / BM	
Athlete	Event	Opposition Score	Opposition Score	Opposition Score	Opposition Score	Opposition Score	Opposition Score	Rank
Marco Vasconcelos	Men's singles	Sridhar (IND); L 16–21, 14–21	Did not advance					
Ana Moura	Women's singles	Cicognini (SUI); L 9–21, 13–21	Did not advance					

== Canoeing ==
Having reached the K-1 1000 metres final and the K-1 500 metres semifinal in his first Olympic appearance, in 2004, Emanuel Silva will be participating in the same two events, in Beijing.

Portugal will be represented in the women's kayak events for the first time, with Teresa Portela and the pair Beatriz Gomes and Helena Rodrigues in the 500 metres distance. All competitors were granted qualification by allocation of spare athlete quota places.

=== Sprint ===
Athlete	Event	Heats		Semifinals		Final	
Athlete	Event	Time	Rank	Time	Rank	Time	Rank
Emanuel Silva	Men's K-1 500 m	1:42.513	6 QS	1:45.985	5	Did not advance	
Emanuel Silva	Men's K-1 1000 m	3:31.843	4 QS	3:34.508	4	Did not advance	
Teresa Portela	Women's K-1 500 m	1:53.761	6 QS	1:54.831	6	Did not advance	
Beatriz Gomes; Helena Rodrigues	Women's K-2 500 m	1:47.588	7 QS	1:46.021	5	Did not advance	

Qualification Legend: QS = Qualify to semi-final; QF = Qualify directly to final

== Cycling ==
A maximum of three places were allocated to Portugal in the men's road event, due to a tenth place in the 2006-2007 UCI Europe Tour nations ranking, which corresponded to a second place in terms of continental Olympic qualification. A quota place was available for the men's time trial event, but it was not taken. The national cycling federation chose to send 2004 Olympic silver medalist Sérgio Paulinho together with André Cardoso and Nuno Ribeiro. However, just five days before the road race event, it was announced that Paulinho would not compete in Beijing due to asthma problems, and that he would not be replaced by another rider.

=== Road ===
Athlete	Event	Time	Rank
André Cardoso	Men's road race	6:39:42	72
Nuno Ribeiro	Men's road race	6:26:17	28

== Equestrian ==
Three horse riders qualified for the individual dressage competition—hence for the team competition, as well—, by benefiting from Switzerland's decision of not competing in the dressage events, but also from allocation of unused quota places. Daniel Pinto returns to the Olympic Games after his debut in Sydney 2000, while his brother Carlos Pinto will make his first Olympic appearance.

=== Dressage ===
Athlete	Horse	Event	Grand Prix		Grand Prix Special		Grand Prix Freestyle		Overall	
Athlete	Horse	Event	Score	Rank	Score	Rank	Score	Rank	Score	Rank
Miguel Ralão Duarte	Oxalis	Individual	Withdrew							
Carlos Pinto	Notavel	Individual	61.708	39	Did not advance					
Daniel Pinto	Galopin de la Font	Individual	63.083	33	Did not advance					
Miguel Ralão Duarte; Carlos Pinto; Daniel Pinto	See above	Team	—N/a						Eliminated	

== Fencing ==
For the second time, since Rome 1960, Portugal qualified a female fencer for the individual foil competition. Débora Nogueira secured her place in Beijing by coming second in the European qualification tournament, held in Lisbon. She is joined by Joaquim Videira, a silver medalist in the men's individual épée at the 2006 World Fencing Championships, who qualified in virtue of his third place in the FIE individual adjusted official ranking (AOR).

Men

Athlete	Event	Round of 64	Round of 32	Round of 16	Quarterfinal	Semifinal	Final / BM	
Athlete	Event	Opposition Score	Opposition Score	Opposition Score	Opposition Score	Opposition Score	Opposition Score	Rank
Joaquim Videira	Individual épée	Torrente (RSA); W 15–10	Zawrotniak (POL); L 9–15	Did not advance				

Women

Athlete	Event	Round of 64	Round of 32	Round of 16	Quarterfinal	Semifinal	Final / BM	
Athlete	Event	Opposition Score	Opposition Score	Opposition Score	Opposition Score	Opposition Score	Opposition Score	Rank
Débora Nogueira	Individual foil	Su Ww (CHN); L 4–15	Did not advance					

== Gymnastics ==
Portugal had qualified two places in trampoline gymnastics.

=== Trampoline ===
Athlete	Event	Qualification		Final	
Athlete	Event	Score	Rank	Score	Rank
Diogo Ganchinho	Men's	69.10	11	Did not advance	
Ana Rente	Women's	31.60	16	Did not advance	

== Judo ==
In the wake of Nuno Delgado's bronze medal in 2000 (the first Olympic judo medal), the national judo scene developed considerably and new stars emerged, achieving international results of credit. Among notable judokas competing in Beijing are 2008 under-81 kg European champion, João Neto, and two-time under-52 kg European champion and 2007 World Judo Championships runner-up, Telma Monteiro.

Men

Athlete	Event	Preliminary	Round of 32	Round of 16	Quarterfinals	Semifinals	Repechage 1	Repechage 2	Repechage 3	Final / BM	
Athlete	Event	Opposition Result	Opposition Result	Opposition Result	Opposition Result	Opposition Result	Opposition Result	Opposition Result	Opposition Result	Opposition Result	Rank
Pedro Dias	−66 kg	Bye	Ortíz (VEN); W 0100–0001	Derly (BRA); W 0101–0010	Pak C-M (PRK); L 0000–0002	Did not advance	Bye	Casale (ITA); L 0001–1001	Did not advance		
João Pina	−73 kg	—N/a	Tritton (CAN); W 0010–0000	Maloumat (IRI); L 0001–0111	Did not advance		Bye	Kanamaru (JPN); L 0010–0011	Did not advance		
João Neto	−81 kg	Gavashelishvili (GEO); W 1010–0000	Topalli (ALB); W 1001–0000	Cardenas (CUB); W 1000–0000	Kim J-B (KOR); L 0000–0001	Did not advance	Bye	Krawczyk (POL); L 0000–1000	Did not advance		

Women

Athlete	Event	Round of 32	Round of 16	Quarterfinals	Semifinals	Repechage 1	Repechage 2	Repechage 3	Final / BM	
Athlete	Event	Opposition Result	Opposition Result	Opposition Result	Opposition Result	Opposition Result	Opposition Result	Opposition Result	Opposition Result	Rank
Ana Hormigo	−48 kg	Tomb (IND); W 1011–0000	Pak O-S (PRK); L 0000–0100	Did not advance		Bye	Nurgazina (KAZ); W 0002–0001	Bogdanova (RUS); L 0010–0100	Did not advance	
Telma Monteiro	−52 kg	Bye	Kharitonova (RUS); W 0211–0000	Xian Dm (CHN); L 0010–1011	Did not advance	Bye	Carrascosa (ESP); L 0001–0101	Did not advance		

== Rowing ==
A national crew achieved qualification for the men's lightweight double sculls event, by reaching second place in the Final Olympic Qualification Regatta, held in Poznań.

Men

Athlete	Event	Heats		Repechage		Semifinals		Final	
Athlete	Event	Time	Rank	Time	Rank	Time	Rank	Time	Rank
Nuno Mendes; Pedro Fraga	Lightweight double sculls	6:24.35	3 R	6:39.07	1 SA/B	6:39.23	6 FB	6:28.47	8

Qualification Legend: FA=Final A (medal); FB=Final B (non-medal); FC=Final C (non-medal); FD=Final D (non-medal); FE=Final E (non-medal); FF=Final F (non-medal); SA/B=Semifinals A/B; SC/D=Semifinals C/D; SE/F=Semifinals E/F; QF=Quarterfinals; R=Repechage

== Sailing ==
A sport with tradition and success in the nation's Olympic history (four medals), the sailing events will feature nine Portuguese sailormen distributed among five classes. Notable sailors include former sailboard world and three-time European champion (Mistral and Neil Pryde RS:X), João Rodrigues; 2003 ISAF Laser world champion, Gustavo Lima; and 2008 470 world championship runner-up and European champion crew, Álvaro Marinho and Miguel Nunes.

Men

Athlete	Event	Race											Net points	Final rank
Athlete	Event	1	2	3	4	5	6	7	8	9	10	M*	Net points	Final rank
João Rodrigues	RS:X	18	10	10	8	14	16	9	3	13	~~19~~	EL	101	11
Gustavo Lima	Laser	5	8	3	~~27~~	17	6	16	8	3	CAN	10	76	4
Álvaro Marinho; Miguel Nunes	470	2	8	15	6	11	7	9	~~OCS~~	10	14	20	102	8
Afonso Domingos; Bernardo Santos	Star	3	3	10	~~OCS~~	13	3	5	7	7	9	12	72	8

Open

Athlete	Event	Race																Net points	Final rank
Athlete	Event	1	2	3	4	5	6	7	8	9	10	11	12	13	14	15	M*	Net points	Final rank
Francisco Andrade; Jorge Lima	49er	12	7	9	11	4	~~DNS~~	10	6	5	11	13	12	CAN	CAN	CAN	EL	100	11

M = Medal race; EL = Eliminated – did not advance into the medal race; CAN = Race cancelled

== Shooting ==
Two male shooters will take part in three events. João Costa returns to the Olympics to compete in the same two events where he debuted in 2000. Manuel Silva also makes an Olympic comeback, in the trap event, sixteen years later. Both qualified as 2006 World Cup winners.

Men

Athlete	Event	Qualification		Final	
Athlete	Event	Points	Rank	Points	Rank
João Costa	10 m air pistol	579	18	Did not advance	
João Costa	50 m pistol	549	33	Did not advance	
Manuel Silva	Trap	111	27	Did not advance	

== Swimming ==
Portuguese swimmers have achieved qualifying standards in the swimming events (up to a maximum of two swimmers per event with the Olympic Qualifying Time (OQT), and potentially one with the Olympic Selection Time (OST)). Additionally, Portugal had qualified one male and one female swimmer to the inaugural open-water marathon.

Men

Athlete	Event	Heat		Semifinal		Final	
Athlete	Event	Time	Rank	Time	Rank	Time	Rank
Carlos Almeida	200 m breaststroke	2:13.34 NR	34	Did not advance			
Diogo Carvalho	200 m individual medley	2:00.66	18	Did not advance			
Fernando Costa	1500 m freestyle	15:26.21	29	—N/a		Did not advance	
Arseniy Lavrentyev	10 km open water	—N/a				2:03:39.6	22
Simão Morgado	100 m butterfly	52.80 NR	33	Did not advance			
Pedro Oliveira	200 m backstroke	2:01.08	28	Did not advance			
Pedro Oliveira	200 m butterfly	1:57.41 NR	24	Did not advance			
Tiago Venâncio	100 m freestyle	50.30	45	Did not advance			
Tiago Venâncio	200 m freestyle	1:50.24	39	Did not advance			

Women

Athlete	Event	Heat		Semifinal		Final	
Athlete	Event	Time	Rank	Time	Rank	Time	Rank
Diana Gomes	100 m breaststroke	1:10.02	26	Did not advance			
Diana Gomes	200 m breaststroke	2:30.18	29	Did not advance			
Daniela Inácio	10 km open water	—N/a				2:00:59.0	17
Sara Oliveira	100 m butterfly	59.48 NR	35	Did not advance			
Sara Oliveira	200 m butterfly	2:10.14 NR	19	Did not advance			

== Table tennis ==
For the first time in Olympic history, Portugal had qualified in table tennis. A maximum of three players participated in the men's singles: João Monteiro, qualified via Continental Qualification Tournament, Marcos Freitas and Tiago Apolónia, qualified due to allocation of unused team quota places.

Athlete	Event	Preliminary round	Round 1	Round 2	Round 3	Round 4	Quarterfinals	Semifinals	Final / BM	
Athlete	Event	Opposition Result	Opposition Result	Opposition Result	Opposition Result	Opposition Result	Opposition Result	Opposition Result	Opposition Result	Rank
Tiago Apolónia	Men's singles	Bye	Lin J (DOM); L 1–4	Did not advance						
Marcos Freitas	Men's singles	Bye	Lashin (EGY); W 4–1	Yang Z (SIN); L 2–4	Did not advance					
João Monteiro	Men's singles	Bye	Toriola (NGR); L 3–4	Did not advance						

== Taekwondo ==
Taekwondo was the second Olympic sport where Portuguese competitors entered for the first time, in Beijing. The feat was achieved by Pedro Póvoa, following his victory in the European Qualification Tournament, held in Istanbul.

Athlete	Event	Round of 16	Quarterfinals	Semifinals	Repechage	Bronze Medal	Final	
Athlete	Event	Opposition Result	Opposition Result	Opposition Result	Opposition Result	Opposition Result	Opposition Result	Rank
Pedro Póvoa	Men's −58 kg	Mercedes (DOM); L 0–3	Did not advance		Chu M-Y (TPE); L (−1)–1	Did not advance		

== Triathlon ==
The nation's second consecutive presence in the Olympic triathlon competition will be expanded to both events, with the qualification of two male triathletes. They will join Vanessa Fernandes, eight place in Athens, who is aiming to grab the Olympic gold medal, following a world title, in 2007, and a fifth consecutive European title, in 2008.

Athlete	Event	Swim (1.5 km)	Trans 1	Bike (40 km)	Trans 2	Run (10 km)	Total Time	Rank
Duarte Marques	Men's	18:20	0:26	59:06	0:27	36:47	1:55:06.57	45
Bruno Pais	Men's	18:28	0:26	58:47	0:27	32:32	1:50:40.22	17
Vanessa Fernandes	Women's	19:53	0:29	1:04:18	0:33	34:21	1:59:34.63	2nd place, silver medalist(s)

== See also ==
- Portugal at the 2008 Summer Paralympics

== Notes and references ==
Notes

References

- "Projecto Pequim 2008" (in Portuguese). Olympic Committee of Portugal. Archived from the original on 2008-04-19.
- "Missão de Portugal aos Jogos da XXIX Olimpíada" (in Portuguese). Olympic Committee of Portugal.
- sports-reference
