= North Korea at the 2008 Summer Olympics =

- IOC code: PRK
- NOC: Olympic Committee of the Democratic People's Republic of Korea

in Beijing
- Competitors: 63 (27 men & 36 women) in 11 sports
- Flag bearers: Pang Mun-Il (opening); Pak Hyon-suk (closing)
- Medals Ranked 34th: Gold 2 Silver 2 Bronze 2 Total 6

Summer Olympics appearances (overview)
- 1972; 1976; 1980; 1984–1988; 1992; 1996; 2000; 2004; 2008; 2012; 2016; 2020; 2024; 2028

North Korea (Democratic People's Republic of Korea) competed in the 2008 Summer Olympics, held in Beijing, People's Republic of China from August 8 to August 24, 2008. The country sent 63 athletes, competing in 11 sports.

North and South Korea had initially intended to send a joint delegation to the Games, but were unable to agree on the details of its implementation. (see South Korea at the 2008 Summer Olympics)

Reportedly, North Korean athletes were barred by their government from mingling with other athletes at the Olympic Village, or from leaving the Village to sightsee.

== Medalists ==
Medal	Name	Sport	Event
Gold	Pak Hyon-suk	Weightlifting	Women's 63 kg
Gold	Hong Un-jong	Gymnastics	Women's vault
Silver	An Kum-ae	Judo	Women's 52 kg
Silver	O Jong-ae	Weightlifting	Women's 58 kg
Bronze	Pak Chol-min	Judo	Men's 66 kg
Bronze	Won Ok-im	Judo	Women's 63 kg

== Archery ==
North Korea sent archers to the Olympics for the fifth time, after not qualifying any for the 2004 Games. Two North Korean women sought the nation's first Olympic medal in the sport. Kwon Un Sil and Son Hye-Yong earned the country two places in the women's individual competition by placing 9th and 24th, respectively, at the 2007 World Outdoor Target Championships.

Athlete	Event	Ranking round		Round of 64	Round of 32	Round of 16	Quarterfinals	Semifinals	Final / BM	
Athlete	Event	Score	Seed	Opposition Score	Opposition Score	Opposition Score	Opposition Score	Opposition Score	Opposition Score	Rank
Kwon Un-sil	Women's individual	656	5	Abtin (IRI) (60); W 106–96	Vardineni (IND) (37); W 106–99	Román (MEX) (12); W 105–100	Avitia (MEX) (20); W 105–99	Park S-H (KOR) (1); L 106–109	Yun O-H (KOR) (2); L 106–109	4
Son Hye-Yong	Women's individual	618	45	Avitia (MEX) (20); L 107–112	Did not advance					

== Athletics ==
Key

- Note–Ranks given for track events are within the athlete's heat only
- Q = Qualified for the next round
- q = Qualified for the next round as a fastest loser or, in field events, by position without achieving the qualifying target
- NR = National record
- N/A = Round not applicable for the event
- Bye = Athlete not required to compete in round

Men

Athlete	Event	Final	
Athlete	Event	Result	Rank
Kim Il-nam	Marathon	2:21:51	42
Pak Song-chol	Marathon	2:21:16	40
Ri Kum-song	Marathon	2:19:08	33

Women

Athlete	Event	Final	
Athlete	Event	Result	Rank
Jo Bun-hui	Marathon	2:37:04	48
Jong Yong-ok	Marathon	2:34:52	36
Kim Kum-ok	Marathon	2:30:01	12

== Boxing ==
North Korea qualified one boxer for the Olympic boxing tournament. Kim Song Guk qualified in the lightweight class at the 2007 World Championships.

Athlete	Event	Round of 32	Round of 16	Quarterfinals	Semifinals	Final	
Athlete	Event	Opposition Result	Opposition Result	Opposition Result	Opposition Result	Opposition Result	Rank
Kim Song-guk	Lightweight	Sow (FRA); L 3–13	Did not advance				

== Diving ==
Men

Athlete	Events	Preliminaries		Semifinals		Final	
Athlete	Events	Points	Rank	Points	Rank	Points	Rank
Kim Chon-man	10 m platform	328.85	30	Did not advance			

Women

Athlete	Events	Preliminaries		Semifinals		Final	
Athlete	Events	Points	Rank	Points	Rank	Points	Rank
Kim Jin-ok	10 m platform	291.90	18 Q	259.40	17	Did not advance	
Kim Un-hyang	10 m platform	316.20	13 Q	267.00	16	Did not advance	
Choe Kum-hui; Kim Un-hyang	10 m synchronized platform	—N/a				308.10	6

== Football ==
=== Women's tournament ===
Roster

Head coach: Kim Kwang-min

North Korea named a squad of 18 players and no alternates for the tournament.

No.	Pos.	Player	Date of birth (age)	Caps	Goals	Club
1	GK	Jon Myong-hui	7 August 1986 (aged 21)			(DPR Korea Football Association) Rimyongsu
2	MF	Kim Kyong-hwa	28 March 1986 (aged 22)			(DPR Korea Football Association) April 25
3	DF	Om Jong-ran	10 October 1985 (aged 22)			(DPR Korea Football Association) April 25
4	DF	Jang Yong-ok	17 September 1982 (aged 25)			(DPR Korea Football Association) April 25
5	DF	Song Jong-sun	11 March 1981 (aged 27)			(DPR Korea Football Association) Amrokkang
6	FW	Kim Ok-sim	2 July 1987 (aged 21)			(DPR Korea Football Association) Rimyongsu
7	MF	Ho Sun-hui	5 March 1980 (aged 28)			(DPR Korea Football Association) Amrokkang
8	FW	Kil Son-hui	7 March 1986 (aged 22)			(DPR Korea Football Association) Rimyongsu
9	MF	Ri Un-suk	1 January 1986 (aged 22)			(DPR Korea Football Association) April 25
10	FW	Ri Kum-suk (captain)	16 August 1978 (aged 29)			(DPR Korea Football Association) April 25
11	MF	Ri Un-gyong	19 November 1980 (aged 27)			(DPR Korea Football Association) Wolmido
12	DF	Ri Un-hyang	15 May 1988 (aged 20)			(DPR Korea Football Association) Amrokkang
13	DF	Yu Jong-hui	21 March 1986 (aged 22)			(DPR Korea Football Association) April 25
14	DF	Jang Il-ok	10 October 1986 (aged 21)			(DPR Korea Football Association) April 25
15	DF	Sonu Kyong-sun	28 September 1983 (aged 24)			(DPR Korea Football Association) April 25
16	DF	Kong Hye-ok	19 July 1983 (aged 25)			(DPR Korea Football Association) April 25
17	FW	Kim Yong-ae	7 March 1983 (aged 25)			(DPR Korea Football Association) April 25
18	GK	Han Hye-yong	4 March 1985 (aged 23)			(DPR Korea Football Association) Pyongyang City

Group play

Pos	Team	Pld	W	D	L	GF	GA	GD	Pts	Qualification
1	Brazil	3	2	1	0	5	2	+3	7	Qualified for the quarterfinals
2	Germany	3	2	1	0	2	0	+2	7	Qualified for the quarterfinals
3	North Korea	3	1	0	2	2	3	−1	3	
4	Nigeria	3	0	0	3	1	5	−4	0	

6 August 2008
19:45

North Korea	1–0	Nigeria
Kim Kyong-hwa 27'	Report

Shenyang Olympic Stadium, Shenyang
Attendance: 24,084
Referee: Shane de Silva (Trinidad and Tobago)
9 August 2008
19:45

Brazil	2–1	North Korea
Daniela 14'; Marta 23'	Report	Ri Kum-suk 90'

Shenyang Olympic Stadium, Shenyang
Attendance: 19,616
Referee: Niu Huijun (China)
12 August 2008
17:00

North Korea	0–1	Germany
	Report	Mittag 86'

Tianjin Olympic Center Stadium, Tianjin
Attendance: 12,387
Referee: Dianne Ferreira-James (Guyana)

== Gymnastics ==
=== Artistic ===
Women

Athlete	Event	Qualification						Final					
Athlete	Event	Apparatus				Total	Rank	Apparatus				Total	Rank
Athlete	Event	F	V	UB	BB	Total	Rank	F	V	UB	BB	Total	Rank
Cha Yong-hwa	Vault	—N/a	13.750	—N/a		13.750	=74	Did not advance					
Cha Yong-hwa	Uneven bars	—N/a		15.175	—N/a	15.175	12	Did not advance					
Hong Un-jong	All-around	13.850	15.650	14.100	12.825	56.425	41	Did not advance					
Hong Un-jong	Vault	—N/a	15.725	—N/a		15.725	2 Q	—N/a	15.650	—N/a		15.650	1st place, gold medalist(s)

== Judo ==
North Korea will send six judoka to Beijing, including:

Men

Athlete	Event	Preliminary	Round of 32	Round of 16	Quarterfinals	Semifinals	Repechage 1	Repechage 2	Repechage 3	Final / BM	
Athlete	Event	Opposition Result	Opposition Result	Opposition Result	Opposition Result	Opposition Result	Opposition Result	Opposition Result	Opposition Result	Opposition Result	Rank
Kim Kyong-jin	−60 kg	Bye	Norbert (MAD); W 1000–0000	Davtyan (ARM); W 0022–0000	Paischer (AUT); L 0000–0020	Did not advance	Bye	Fallon (GBR); L 0001–0100	Did not advance		
Pak Chol-min	−66 kg	Bye	Nurmuhammedow (TKM); W 1000–0000	Casale (ITA); W 0010–0001	Dias (POR); W 0002–0000	Darbelet (FRA); L 0001–0210	Bye			Sharipov (UZB); W 0100–0001	3rd place, bronze medalist(s)
Kim Chol-su	−73 kg	—N/a	Girones (CUB); W 1000–0001	Kevkhishvili (GEO); W 0111–0110	Mammadli (AZE); L 0000–0200	Did not advance	Bye	van Tichelt (BEL); L 0000–1011	Did not advance		

Women

Athlete	Event	Round of 32	Round of 16	Quarterfinals	Semifinals	Repechage 1	Repechage 2	Repechage 3	Final / BM	
Athlete	Event	Opposition Result	Opposition Result	Opposition Result	Opposition Result	Opposition Result	Opposition Result	Opposition Result	Opposition Result	Rank
Pak Ok-song	−48 kg	Bye	Hormigo (POR); W 0100–0000	Nurgazina (KAZ); W 0011–0001	Bermoy (CUB); L 0000–1021	Bye			Pareto (ARG); L 0001–0100	5
An Kum-ae	−52 kg	Mestre (CUB); W 0201–0000	Velázquez (VEN); W 0010–0001	Kaliyeva (KAZ); W 0200–0000	Nakamura (JPN); W 0001–0000	Bye			Xian (CHN); L 0001–0011	2nd place, silver medalist(s)
Kye Sun-Hui	−57 kg	Filzmoser (AUT); W 1001–0001	Harel (FRA); L 0010–0101	Did not advance						
Won Ok-Im	−63 kg	Bye	Krukower (ARG); W 0020–0010	Willeboordse (NED); W 0200–0000	Décosse (FRA); L 0000–0211	Bye			Heill (AUT); W 0110–0001	3rd place, bronze medalist(s)

== Shooting ==
North Korea will be represented by six shooters, including Kim Jong-su, who won bronze in the men's 50m pistol in Athens. Kim Jong-su, who originally won a silver medal in the men's 50 metre pistol and a bronze medal in the men's 10 metre air pistol, was tested positive for the banned substance of propranolol, and subsequently stripped off his medals.

Men

Athlete	Event	Qualification		Final	
Athlete	Event	Points	Rank	Points	Rank
Kim Jong-su	10 m air pistol	584	3 Q	~~683~~	DSQ
Kim Jong-su	50 m pistol	563	2 Q	660.2	DSQ
Kwon Tong-hyok	10 m air pistol	575	26	Did not advance	
Ryu Myong-yon	50 m pistol	551	27	Did not advance	

Women

Athlete	Event	Qualification		Final	
Athlete	Event	Points	Rank	Points	Rank
Jo Yong-suk	10 m air pistol	382	15	Did not advance	
Jo Yong-suk	25 m pistol	584	4 Q	783.4	6
Pak Jong-ran	Skeet	66	9	Did not advance	
Pak Yong-hui	Trap	56	18	Did not advance	

== Synchronized swimming ==
Athlete	Event	Technical routine		Free routine (preliminary)			Free routine (final)		
Athlete	Event	Points	Rank	Points	Total (technical + free)	Rank	Points	Total (technical + free)	Rank
Kim Yong-mi; Wang Ok-gyong	Duet	42.917	16	43.584	86.501	16	Did not advance		

== Table tennis ==
Athlete	Event	Preliminary round	Round 1	Round 2	Round 3	Round 4	Quarterfinals	Semifinals	Final / BM	
Athlete	Event	Opposition Result	Opposition Result	Opposition Result	Opposition Result	Opposition Result	Opposition Result	Opposition Result	Opposition Result	Rank
Jang Song-man	Men's singles	Aguirre (PAR); W 4–0	Liu S (ARG); W 4–2	He Z W (ESP); W 4–2	Li C (HKG); L 1–4	Did not advance				
Kim Hyok-bong	Men's singles	Al-Hasan (KUW); W 4–2	Monteiro (BRA); W 4–1	Chiang P-L (TPE); W 4–2	Boll (GER); L 1–4	Did not advance				
Ri Chol-Guk	Men's singles	Bye	Gardos (AUT); L 3–4	Did not advance						
Kim Jong	Women's singles	Bye	Ramos (VEN); W 4–0	Dodean (ROU); W 4–1	Park M-Y (KOR); L 0–4	Did not advance				
Kim Mi-yong	Women's singles	Bye	Paškauskienė (LTU); L 3–4	Did not advance						

== Weightlifting ==
Men

Athlete	Event	Snatch		Clean & Jerk		Total	Rank
Athlete	Event	Result	Rank	Result	Rank	Total	Rank
Cha Kum-chol	−56 kg	128	5	155	5	283	5
Ri Kyong-sok	−56 kg	~~122~~	DNF	—	—	—	DNF
Im Yong-su	−62 kg	138	3	~~168~~	DNF	138	DNF
Kim Chol-jin	−69 kg	146	=8	180	6	326	6

Women

Athlete	Event	Snatch		Clean & Jerk		Total	Rank
Athlete	Event	Result	Rank	Result	Rank	Total	Rank
O Jong-ae	−58 kg	95	6	131	2	226	2nd place, silver medalist(s)
Pak Hyon-suk	−63 kg	106	2	135	1	241	1st place, gold medalist(s)
Hong Yong-ok	−69 kg	~~103~~	DNF	—	—	—	DNF

== Wrestling ==
Key:

- VT - Victory by Fall.
- PP - Decision by Points - the loser with technical points.
- PO - Decision by Points - the loser without technical points.

Men's freestyle

Athlete	Event	Qualification	Round of 16	Quarterfinal	Semifinal	Repechage 1	Repechage 2	Final / BM	
Athlete	Event	Opposition Result	Opposition Result	Opposition Result	Opposition Result	Opposition Result	Opposition Result	Opposition Result	Rank
Yang Kyong-il	−55 kg	Bye	Sevdimov (AZE); L 1–3 ^{PP}	Did not advance					12
Yang Chun-song	−66 kg	Bye	Batyrov (BLR); L 1–3 ^{PP}	Did not advance					15

Men's Greco-Roman

Athlete	Event	Qualification	Round of 16	Quarterfinal	Semifinal	Repechage 1	Repechage 2	Final / BM	
Athlete	Event	Opposition Result	Opposition Result	Opposition Result	Opposition Result	Opposition Result	Opposition Result	Opposition Result	Rank
Cha Kwang-su	−55 kg	Bye	Hernández (CUB); L 1–3 ^{PP}	Did not advance					15
