= Equestrian at the 2008 Summer Olympics – Team dressage =

Team dressage at the Games of the XXIX Olympiad
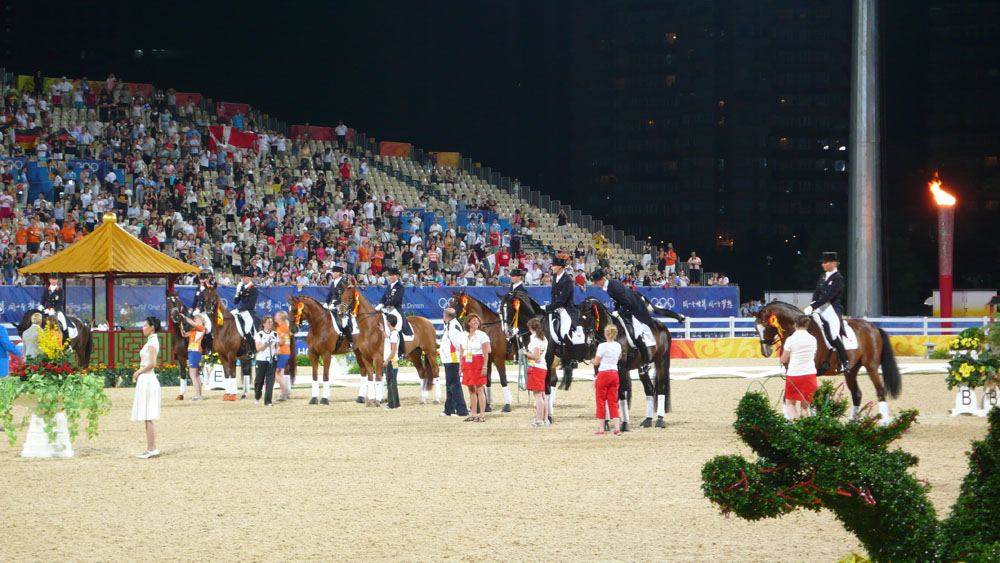
- Medal ceremony
- Venue: Hong Kong Sports Institute
- Date: 13–14 August

Medalists
1st place, gold medalist(s)		Heike Kemmer; Nadine Capellmann; Isabell Werth	Germany
2nd place, silver medalist(s)		Hans Peter Minderhoud; Imke Schellekens-Bartels; Anky van Grunsven	Netherlands
3rd place, bronze medalist(s)		Anne van Olst; Nathalie zu Sayn-Wittgenstein; Andreas Helgstrand	Denmark

The team dressage at the 2008 Summer Olympics took place between August 13 and 14 at the Hong Kong Sports Institute. Each horse and rider pair performed an FEI Grand Prix Test. The Grand Prix Test consists of a battery of required movements that each rider and horse pair performs. Five judges evaluate the pair, giving marks between 0 and 10 for each element. The judges' scores were averaged to give a final score for the pair. The best three scores from each team's four members were summed to give a team score.

The results from this event also served as a qualifier for the individual dressage event.

== Medalists ==
Gold:		Silver:		Bronze:	
Germany		Netherlands		Denmark	
Heike Kemmer	Bonaparte	Hans Peter Minderhoud	Nadine	Anne van Olst	Clearwater
Nadine Capellmann	Elvis Va	Imke Schellekens-Bartels	Sunrise	Nathalie zu Sayn-Wittgenstein	Digby
Isabell Werth	Satchmo	Anky van Grunsven	Salinero	Andreas Helgstrand	Don Schufro

== Results ==
Rank	Country			Total
Rank	Rider	Horse	% Score	Total
1st place, gold medalist(s)	Germany			72.917
1st place, gold medalist(s)	Isabell Werth	Satchmo	76.417	72.917
1st place, gold medalist(s)	Heike Kemmer	Bonaparte	72.250	72.917
1st place, gold medalist(s)	Nadine Capellmann	Elvis Va	70.083	72.917
2nd place, silver medalist(s)	Netherlands			71.750
2nd place, silver medalist(s)	Anky van Grunsven	Salinero	74.750	71.750
2nd place, silver medalist(s)	Hans Peter Minderhoud	Nadine	69.625	71.750
2nd place, silver medalist(s)	Imke Schellekens-Bartels	Sunrise	70.875	71.750
3rd place, bronze medalist(s)	Denmark			68.875
3rd place, bronze medalist(s)	Nathalie zu Sayn-Wittgenstein	Digby	70.417	68.875
3rd place, bronze medalist(s)	Andreas Helgstrand	Don Schufro	68.833	68.875
3rd place, bronze medalist(s)	Anne van Olst	Clearwater	67.375	68.875
4	Sweden			67.347
4	Jan Brink	Briar	68.875	67.347
4	Patrik Kittel	Floresco	67.125	67.347
4	Tinne Silfven	Solos Carex	66.042	67.347
5	Great Britain			66.806
5	Emma Hindle	Lancet	71.125	66.806
5	Laura Bechtolsheimer	Mistral Hojris	65.917	66.806
5	Jane Gregory	Lucky Star	63.375	66.806
6	France			65.403
6	Hubert Perring	Diabolo St Maurice	66.833	65.403
6	Marc Boblet	Whitini Star	66.125	65.403
6	Julia Chevanne	Calimucho	63.250	65.403
7	Australia			64.625
7	Kristy Oatley	Quando Quando	65.750	64.625
7	Hayley Beresford	Relampago	65.583	64.625
7	Heath Ryan	Greenoaks Dundee	62.542	64.625
8	Canada			63.514
8	Ashley Holzer	Pop art	67.042	63.514
8	Jacqueline Brooks	Gran Gesto	63.750	63.514
8	Leslie Reid	Orion	59.750	63.514
9	Japan			60.653
9	Hiroshi Hoketsu	Whisper	62.542	60.653
9	Mieko Yagi	Dow Jones	60.167	60.653
9	Yuko Kitai	Rambo	59.250	60.653
	Portugal			EL
	Daniel Pinto	Galopin de la Font	63.083	EL
	Carlos Pinto	Notavel	61.708	EL
	Miguel Ralão Duarte	Oxalis	RT	EL
	United States			DSQ*
	Courtney King	Mythilus	DSQ	DSQ*
	Steffen Peters	Ravel	70.000	DSQ*
	Debbie McDonald	Brentina	63.000	DSQ*

*Courtney King and Mythilus were sanctioned on September 22, 2008, which led to the disqualification of the US Dressage team.
