= Amin El Hady =

Egyptian judoka

Personal information
- Full name: Amin El-Hady
- Nationality: Egypt
- Born: 13 April 1983 (age 43) Al Sharqiyah, Egypt
- Occupation: Judoka
- Height: 1.65 m (5 ft 5 in)
- Weight: 66 kg (146 lb)

Sport
- Sport: Judo
- Event: 66 kg
- Club: El-Zankalon Youth Center
Medal record
Men's judo
Representing Egypt
All-Africa Games
| Silver medal – second place | 2007 Algiers | 66 kg |
African Championships
| Gold medal – first place | 2006 Port Louis | 66 kg |
| Gold medal – first place | 2008 Agadir | 66 kg |
| Gold medal – first place | 2009 Port Louis | 66 kg |
| Silver medal – second place | 2004 Tunis | 66 kg |
| Silver medal – second place | 2010 Yaounde | 66 kg |

Profile at external databases
- JudoInside.com: 26874

Amin El-Hady (also Amin El-Hady, Arabic: أمين الهادي; born April 13, 1983) is an Egyptian judoka, who played for the half-lightweight category. He is a two-time Olympian and a five-time medalist (three gold and two silver) at the African Judo Championships. He also captured a silver medal for his division at the 2007 All-Africa Games in Algiers, Algeria, losing out to the host nation's Mounir Benamadi.

El-Hady made his official debut for the 2004 Summer Olympics in Athens, where he lost the first preliminary round match of men's half-lightweight class (66 kg), by an ippon and a sumi gaeshi, to Algeria's Amar Meridja.

At the 2008 Summer Olympics in Beijing, El-Hady competed for the second time in the men's half-lightweight class (66 kg). He first defeated Armenia's Armen Nazaryan in the first preliminary round, before losing out his next match by a single koka and an ōuchi gari to Cuba's Yordanis Arencibia. Because his opponent advanced further into the semi-finals, El-Hady was offered another shot at the bronze medal by defeating Andorra's Daniel García González and United States' Taylor Takata in the repechage rounds. He finished only in seventh place, after losing out the final repechage bout to Uzbekistan's Mirali Sharipov, who successfully scored a waza-ari (half-point) and a tomoe nage (circle throw), at the end of the five-minute period.
