= Equestrian at the 2008 Summer Olympics – Individual dressage =

Individual dressage at the Games of the XXIX Olympiad
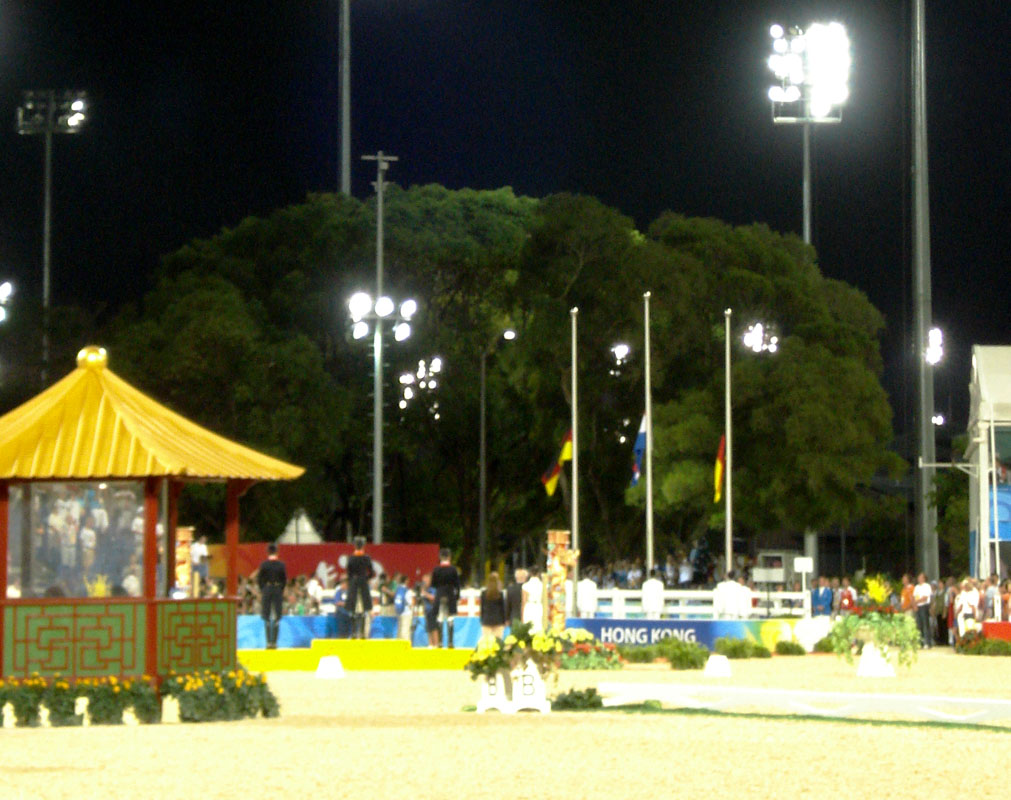
- Medal ceremony
- Venue: Hong Kong Sports Institute
- Date: 13–19 August

Medalists
| 1st place, gold medalist(s) | | Anky van Grunsven | Netherlands |
| 2nd place, silver medalist(s) | | Isabell Werth | Germany |
| 3rd place, bronze medalist(s) | | Heike Kemmer | Germany |

The individual dressage at the 2008 Summer Olympics took place between 13 and 19 August, at the Hong Kong Sports Institute.

The first round of the individual dressage competition is the same FEI Grand Prix Test used for the team dressage event. The Grand Prix Test consists of a battery of required movements that each rider and horse pair performs. Five judges evaluate the pair, giving marks between 0 and 10 for each element. The judges' scores were averaged to give a final score for the pair.

The top 25 individual competitors in that round advance to the individual-only competitions, though each nation was limited to three pairs advancing. This second round consisted of a Grand Prix Special Test, which used the same movements as the first round's Grand Prix Test but required the pair to complete them in a shorter time. The 15 best pairs in the Grand Prix Special Test advanced to the final round. In that round, the Grand Prix Freestyle Test, competitors designed their own choreography set to music. Judges in that round evaluated the artistic merit of the performance and music as well as the technical aspects of the dressage. Final scores were based on the average of the Freestyle and Special Test results.

== Medalists ==
| Gold | | Silver | | Bronze | |
|---|---|---|---|---|---|
| Netherlands | | Germany | | Germany | |
| Anky van Grunsven | Salinero | Isabell Werth | Satchmo | Heike Kemmer | Bonaparte |

== Results ==
| Rank | Rider | Nation | Horse | GP Score | Rank | GPS Score | Rank | GPF Score | Rank | Total GPS+GPF Score |
|---|---|---|---|---|---|---|---|---|---|---|
| 1st place, gold medalist(s) | Anky van Grunsven | Netherlands | Salinero | 74.750 | 2 | 74.960 | 2 | 82.400 | 1 | 78.680 |
| 2nd place, silver medalist(s) | Isabell Werth | Germany | Satchmo | 76.417 | 1 | 75.200 | 1 | 78.100 | 2 | 76.650 |
| 3rd place, bronze medalist(s) | Heike Kemmer | Germany | Bonaparte | 72.250 | 3 | 72.960 | 3 | 75.950 | 4 | 74.455 |
| 4 | Steffen Peters | United States | Ravel | 70.000 | 10 | 71.800 | 4 | 76.500 | 3 | 74.150 |
| 5 | Hans Peter Minderhoud | Netherlands | Nadine | 69.625 | 11 | 70.920 | 7 | 75.150 | 5 | 73.035 |
| 6 | Alexandra Korelova | Russia | Balagur | 68.500 | 15 | 71.400 | 4 | 73.850 | 8 | 72.625 |
| 7 | Emma Hindle | Great Britain | Lancet | 71.125 | 4 | 70.440 | 9 | 74.250 | 6 | 72.345 |
| 8 | Kyra Kyrklund | Finland | Max | 70.583 | 6 | 69.720 | 10 | 74.250 | 6 | 71.985 |
| 9 | Bernadette Pujals | Mexico | Vincent | 69.250 | 12 | 71.000 | 6 | 72.350 | 11 | 71.675 |
| 10 | Jan Brink | Sweden | Briar | 68.875 | 13 | 68.960 | 13 | 73.450 | 9 | 71.205 |
| 11 | Andreas Helgstrand | Denmark | Don Schufro | 68.833 | 14 | 68.800 | 14 | 72.550 | 10 | 70.675 |
| 12 | Tinne Silfven | Sweden | Solos Carex | 66.042 | 23 | 69.240 | 11 | 71.450 | 12 | 70.345 |
| 13 | Ashley Holzer | Canada | Pop art | 67.042 | 19 | 68.760 | 15 | 71.450 | 12 | 70.105 |
| 14 | Nathalie Zu Seyn-Wittgenstein | Denmark | Digby | 70.417 | 8 | 69.120 | 12 | 69.100 | 15 | 69.110 |
| 15 | Juan Manuel Muñoz | Spain | Duego XII | 66.083 | 22 | 68.160 | 16 | | | |
| 16 | Nadine Capellmann | Germany | Elvis Va | 70.083 | 9 | 67.240 | 17 | | | |
| 17 | Laura Bechtolsheimer | Great Britain | Mistral Hojris | 65.917 | 24 | 67.160 | 18 | | | |
| 18 | Hayley Beresford | Australia | Relampago | 65.583 | 26 | 66.320 | 19 | | | |
| 19 | Kristy Oatley | Australia | Quando Quando | 65.750 | 25 | 66.080 | 20 | | | |
| 20 | Marc Boblet | France | Whitini Star | 66.125 | 21 | 65.640 | 21 | | | |
| 21 | Anne van Olst | Denmark | Clearwater | 67.375 | 17 | 65.320 | 22 | | | |
| 22 | Michal Rapcewicz | Poland | Randon | 67.500 | 16 | 65.120 | 23 | | | |
| 23 | Patrik Kittel | Sweden | Floresco | 67.125 | 18 | 64.360 | 24 | | | |
| 24 | Hubert Perring | France | Diabolo St Maurice | 66.833 | 20 | 62.680 | 25 | | | |
| 25 | Imke Schellekens-Bartels | Netherlands | Sunrise | 70.875 | 5 | WD | 26 | | | |
| 26 | Victoria Max-Theurer | Austria | Falcao | 65.333 | 27 | | | | | |
| 27 | Jordi Domingo | Spain | Prestige | 64.042 | 28 | | | | | |
| 28 | Jacqueline Brooks | Canada | Gran Gesto | 63.750 | 29 | | | | | |
| 29 | Iryna Lis | Belarus | Redford | 63.500 | 30 | | | | | |
| 30 | Jane Gregory | Great Britain | Lucky Star | 63.375 | 31 | | | | | |
| 31 | Julia Chevanne | France | Calimucho | 63.250 | 32 | | | | | |
| 32 | Daniel Pinto | Portugal | Galopin de la Font | 63.083 | 33 | | | | | |
| 33 | Debbie McDonald | United States | Brentina | 63.000 | 34 | | | | | |
| 34 | Hiroshi Hoketsu | Japan | Whisper | 62.542 | 35 | | | | | |
| 34 | Heath Ryan | Australia | Greenoaks Dundee | 62.542 | 35 | | | | | |
| 36 | Tatyana Miloserdova | Russia | Wat a feeling | 61.875 | 37 | | | | | |
| 36 | Pierluigi Sangiorgi | Italy | Flourian | 61.875 | 37 | | | | | |
| 38 | Carlos Pinto | Portugal | Notavel | 61.708 | 39 | | | | | |
| 39 | Luiza Almeida | Brazil | Samba | 60.833 | 40 | | | | | |
| 40 | Liu Lina | China | Piroschka | 60.625 | 41 | | | | | |
| 41 | Mieko Yagi | Japan | Dow Jones | 60.167 | 42 | | | | | |
| 42 | Leandro Silva | Brazil | Oceano Do Top | 60.125 | 43 | | | | | |
| 43 | Leslie Reid | Canada | Orion | 59.750 | 44 | | | | | |
| 44 | Yuko Kitai | Japan | Rambo | 59.250 | 45 | | | | | |
| 45 | Choi Jun-sang | South Korea | Cinque Cento | 57.333 | 46 | | | | | |
| | Miguel Duarte | Portugal | Oxalis | RT | | | | | | |
| | Courtney King-Dye | United States | Mythilus | DSQ | | | | | | |
