= Judo at the 2008 Summer Olympics – Men's 66 kg =

Men's 66 kg at the Games of the XXIX Olympiad
- Venue: Beijing Science and Technology University Gymnasium
- Dates: 10 August 2008
- Winning score: 1000

Medalists
1st place, gold medalist(s)		Masato Uchishiba	Japan
2nd place, silver medalist(s)		Benjamin Darbelet	France
3rd place, bronze medalist(s)		Yordanis Arencibia	Cuba
3rd place, bronze medalist(s)		Pak Chol-Min	North Korea

The men's 66 kg tournament in judo at the 2008 Summer Olympics was held on August 10 at the Beijing Science and Technology University Gymnasium. Preliminary rounds were held at 12:00 pm CST. Repechage finals, semifinals, bouts for bronze medals and the final took place at 8:00 pm CST.

This event was the second-lightest of the men's judo weight classes, limiting competitors to a maximum of 66 kilograms of body mass. Like all other judo events, bouts lasted five minutes. If the bout was still tied at the end, it was extended for another five-minute, sudden-death period; if neither judoka scored during that period, the match is decided by the judges. The tournament bracket consisted of a single-elimination contest culminating in a gold medal match. There was also a repechage to determine the winners of the two bronze medals. Each judoka who had lost to a semifinalist competed in the repechage. The two judokas who lost in the semifinals faced the winner of the opposite half of the bracket's repechage in bronze medal bouts.

== Tournament results ==
=== Final ===
Final
1	Benjamin Darbelet (FRA)	0000
2	Masato Uchishiba (JPN)	1000

=== Mat 1 ===
Round of 64
Ungvari (HUN)	0011
Wu (CHN)	0001

Round of 32
Casale (ITA)	1000
Novoa (CHI)	0000
Nurmuhammedov (TKM)	0000
Pak (PRK)	1000
Ortíz (VEN)	0001
Dias (POR)	0100
Derly (BRA)	0002
Kim Joo-Jin (KOR)	0001
Gasimov (AZE)	0101
Gadanov (RUS)	0120
Ungvari (HUN)	1000
Kedelashvili (GEO)	0000
Mehmedovic (CAN)	0011
Ibañez (ECU)	0001
Rguig (MAR)	0000
Darbelet (FRA)	1002

Round of 16
Casale (ITA)	0001
Pak (PRK)	0010
Dias (POR)	0101
Derly (BRA)	0010
Gadanov (RUS)	0011
Ungvari (HUN)	0002
Mehmedovic (CAN)	0000
Darbelet (FRA)	0001

Quarterfinals
Pak (PRK)	0002
Dias (POR)	0000
Gadanov (RUS)	0010
Darbelet (FRA)	1010

Semifinals
Pak (PRK)	0001
Darbelet (FRA)	0201

=== Mat 2 ===
Round of 64

Round of 32
Masato Uchishiba (JPN)	1001
Juan Jacinto (DOM)	0000
Arash Miresmaeili (IRI)	0001
Tomasz Adamiec (POL)	0000
Oscar Penas (ESP)	0000
Mirali Sharipov (UZB)	1010
Mounir Benamadi (ALG)	1010
Steven Brown (AUS)	0000
Tariel Zintiridis (GRE)	0000
Taylor Takata (USA)	0010
Dex Elmont (NED)	1000
Edson Madeira (MOZ)	0000
Yordanis Arencibia (CUB)	1010
Daniel Garcia Gonzalez (AND)	0000
Armen Nazaryan (ARM)	0000
Aheen El Hady (EGY)	0001

Round of 16
Masato Uchishiba (JPN)	0020
Arash Miresmaeili (IRI)	0000
Mirali Sharipov (UZB)	0001
Mounir Benamadi (ALG)	0000
Taylor Takata (USA)	0001
Dex Elmont (NED)	0000
Yordanis Arencibia (CUB)	0001
Aheen El Hady (EGY)	0000

Quarterfinals
Masato Uchishiba (JPN)	0201
Mirali Sharipov (UZB)	0010
Taylor Takata (USA)	0000
Yordanis Arencibia (CUB)	0010

Semifinals
Masato Uchishiba (JPN)	0020
Yordanis Arencibia (CUB)	0001

=== Repechage ===
First round
Nurmuhammedov (TKM)	0000
Casale (ITA)	0012
Rguig (MAR)	0000
Mehmedovic (CAN)	0201
Jacinto (DOM)	0000
Miresmaeili (IRI)	0011
Gonzalez (AND)	0001
El Hady (EGY)	1001

Second round
Dias (POR)	0001
Casale (ITA)	1001
Gadanov (RUS)	1000
Mehmedovic (CAN)	0000
Sharipov (UZB)	0010
Miresmaeili (IRI)	0001
Takata (USA)	0001
El Hady (EGY)	1000

Third round
Casale (ITA)	0010
Gadanov (RUS)	1002
Sharipov (UZB)	0101
El Hady (EGY)	0001

Bronze medal finals
Arencibia (CUB)	0010
Gadanov (RUS)	0001
Pak (PRK)	0100
Sharipov (UZB)	0001

== Final ranking ==
Rank	Athlete
Gold medal	Masato Uchishiba (JPN)
Silver medal	Benjamin Darbelet (FRA)
Bronze medal	Yordanis Arencibia (CUB)
Bronze medal	Pak Chol-Min (PRK)
5	Alim Gadanov (RUS)
5	Mirali Sharipov (UZB)
7	Giovanni Casale (ITA)
7	Aheen El Hady (EGY)
