= Zheng Qin =

Chinese association football player

Personal information
- Date of birth: 12 December 1971 (age 54)
- Position: Defender

International career
Years	Team	Apps	(Gls)
- China

Zheng Qin (born December 12, 1971) is a Chinese professional association football player who plays as a defender for the Chinese Women's Super League. She is also a member of the Chinese women's national football team. Qin represented China in the 2006 AFC Women's Asian Cup.
