= 2001–02 in Australian soccer =

Soccer in Australia
- Season: 2001–02

Men's soccer
- NSL Premiership: Perth Glory
- NSL Championship: Sydney Olympic

Women's soccer
- WNSL Premiership: NSW Sapphires
- WNSL Championship: Canberra Eclipse

The 2001–02 season was the 33rd season of national competitive soccer in Australia and 119th overall.

== National teams ==
=== Australia national soccer team ===
==== Results and fixtures ====
===== Friendlies =====
15 August 2001	Japan	3–0	Australia	Fukuroi, Japan
	Yanagisawa 19'; Hattori 53'; Nakayama 65' (pen.)	Report		Stadium: Shizuoka Stadium; Attendance: 60,000; Referee: Zhang Jianjun

11 November 2001	Australia	1–1	France	Melbourne, Australia
	Moore 43'	Report	Trezeguet 49'	Stadium: Melbourne Cricket Ground; Attendance: 53,173; Referee: Simon Micallef (Australia)

===== 2002 FIFA World Cup qualification =====
====== Intercontinental play-off ======
20 November 2001	Australia	1–0	Uruguay	Melbourne, Australia
	Muscat 79' (pen.)	Report		Stadium: Melbourne Cricket Ground; Attendance: 84,656; Referee: Graziano Cesare (Italy

25 November 2001	Uruguay	3–0	Australia	Montevideo, Uruguay
	Silva 14'; Morales 70', 90'	Report		Stadium: Estadio Centenario; Attendance: 62,000; Referee: Ali Bujsaim (United Arab Emirates)

=== Australia women's national soccer team ===
==== Results and fixtures ====
===== Friendlies =====
13 January 2002	Australia	1–0	South Korea	Wagga Wagga, Australia
	Mann 72'	Report		Stadium: Robertson Oval; Attendance: 3,712

16 January 2002	Australia	1–0	South Korea	Albury, Australia
	Peters 32'	Report		Stadium: Lavington Sports Ground; Attendance: 2,074

19 January 2002	Australia	4–1	South Korea	Bendigo, Australia
	Mann 29'; Golebiowski 66'; Black 75'; Garriock 79'	Report	Jung-suk 41'	Stadium: Tom Flood Sports Centre; Attendance: 2,479

3 April 2002	Australia	0–0	Canada	Poitiers, France
		Report		Stadium: Stade de la Pépinière

6 April 2002	Australia	1–1	Canada	Angoulême, France
	Golebiowski 31'	Report	Kasajima 89'	Stadium: Stade Camille-Lebon

9 April 2002	France	1–0	Australia	Limoges, France
	Picho 37'	Report		Stadium: Parc des Sports de Beaublanc

== Men's soccer ==
=== National Soccer League ===
Pos	Team	Pld	W	D	L	GF	GA	GD	Pts	Qualification
1	Perth Glory	24	16	7	1	52	23	+29	55	Qualification for the Finals series
2	Newcastle United	24	10	12	2	33	21	+12	42	Qualification for the Finals series
3	Olympic Sharks (C)	24	12	4	8	37	24	+13	40	Qualification for the Finals series
4	Brisbane Strikers	24	10	7	7	40	34	+6	37	Qualification for the Finals series
5	South Melbourne	24	10	6	8	30	22	+8	36	Qualification for the Finals series
6	Melbourne Knights	24	11	3	10	41	40	+1	36	Qualification for the Finals series
7	Parramatta Power	24	10	4	10	34	30	+4	34	
8	Northern Spirit	24	9	7	8	36	39	−3	34	
9	Marconi Fairfield	24	8	6	10	33	36	−3	30	
10	Wollongong Wolves	24	6	7	11	28	43	−15	25	
11	Sydney United	24	6	6	12	27	37	−10	24	
12	Adelaide Force	24	4	8	12	27	39	−12	20	
13	Football Kingz	24	3	5	16	28	58	−30	14	

Source: rsssf.com
Rules for classification: 1) Points; 2) Goal difference; 3) Goals scored
(C) Champions

==== Finals series ====
Elimination Finals
6	Melbourne Knights	0	2	2
3	Olympic Sharks	0	6	6
5	South Melbourne	2	2	4
4	Brisbane Strikers	0	1	1

Major/Minor Semifinals
1	Perth Glory	4	0	4
2	Newcastle United	1	2	3
3	Olympic Sharks	2
5	South Melbourne	1

Preliminary Final
2	Newcastle United	0
3	Olympic Sharks	1

Grand Final
12 May 2002
Perth Glory	0
Olympic Sharks	1

== Women's soccer ==
=== Women's National Soccer League ===
Pos	Team	Pld	W	D	L	GF	GA	GD	Pts	Qualification or relegation
1	NSW Sapphires	10	9	1	0	39	7	+32	28	Qualification for the Grand Final
2	Canberra Eclipse (C)	10	6	2	2	20	9	+11	20	Qualification for the Grand Final
3	Queensland Sting	10	5	3	2	16	8	+8	18	
4	Adelaide Sensation	10	3	0	7	12	23	−11	9	
5	Northern NSW Pride	10	2	1	7	15	32	−17	7	
6	Victoria Vision	10	1	1	8	5	28	−23	4	

Updated to match(es) played on unknown. Source: OzFootball
Rules for classification: 1) Points; 2) Goal difference; 3) Goals scored
(C) Champions
