= Pak Chol-min =

- Hangul: 박철민
- RR: Bak Cheolmin
- MR: Pak Ch'ŏlmin

Pak Chol-min may refer to:

- Pak Chol-min (judoka)
- Pak Chol-min (footballer)
- Park Chul-min, South Korean actor
- Pak Chol-min (politician), Chairman of the Kimilsungist-Kimjongilist Youth League
