= Felipe Novoa =

Chilean judoka (born 1984)

Personal information
- Full name: Felipe Novoa Cianelli
- Nationality: Chile
- Born: 28 April 1984 (age 42) Santiago, Chile
- Height: 1.73 m (5 ft 8 in)
- Weight: 66 kg (146 lb)

Sport
- Sport: Judo
- Event: 66 kg
- College team: Miami Hurricanes (USA)

Felipe Novoa Cianelli (born 28 April 1984 in Santiago) is a Chilean judoka, who played for the half-lightweight category. He won a bronze medal for his division at the 2005 Pan American Judo Championships in Caguas, Puerto Rico, and added three more titles to his collection from the South American Championships. Novoa is also the son of Eduardo Novoa, who competed in the men's middleweight class at the 1984 Summer Olympics in Los Angeles, California.

Novoa represented Chile at the 2008 Summer Olympics in Beijing, where he competed for the men's half-lightweight class (66 kg). He received a bye for the second preliminary round match, before losing out, by an ippon (full point) and an uchi mata (inner thigh throw), to Italy's Giovanni Casale.
