= Yuko Kitai =

Japanese equestrian

Personal information
- Born: January 15, 1973 (age 53) Yokohama, Japan

Yuko Kitai (北井 裕子, Kitai Yūko; born 15 January 1973 in Yokohama, Japan) is a Japanese Olympic dressage rider. Representing Japan, she competed at two Summer Olympics (in 2008 and 2016). Her best Olympic results came in 2008 when she placed 9th in the team and 45th in the individual dressage events.

She also competed at the 2010 World Equestrian Games, where she achieved 13th and 54th positions in team and individual competitions, respectively.
