= 2001–02 Women's National Soccer League =

6th season of the Women's National Soccer League

Women's National Soccer League
- Season: 2001–02
- Dates: 3 November 2001 – 9 March 2002
- Champions: Canberra Eclipse; 1st title
- Premiers: NSW Sapphires; 2nd title
- Biggest away win: Adelaide Sensation 0–5 NSW Sapphires (2 December 2000)
- Highest scoring: NSW Sapphires 5–1 Northern NSW Pride (17 November 2000)
- Longest winning run: 5 matches Queensland Sting
- Longest unbeaten run: 5 matches Queensland Sting
- Longest winless run: 5 matches Canberra Eclipse
- Longest losing run: 4 matches Canberra Eclipse

The 2001–02 Women's National Soccer League was the sixth season of the Women's National Soccer League. The season began on 3 November 2001, and concluded with the grand final on 9 March 2002.

Queensland Sting were the defending champions, as Canberra Eclipse won their first championship in a 1–0 win over NSW Sapphires in the grand final.

== Teams ==
Locations of the 2001–02 Women's National Soccer League
- Adelaide Sensation
- Canberra Eclipse
- Northern NSW Pride
- NSW Sapphires
- Queensland Sting
- Victoria Vision

== Regular season ==
=== League table ===
Pos	Team	Pld	W	D	L	GF	GA	GD	Pts	Qualification or relegation
1	NSW Sapphires	10	9	1	0	39	7	+32	28	Qualification for Grand final
2	Canberra Eclipse	10	6	2	2	20	9	+11	20	Qualification for Grand final
3	Queensland Sting	10	5	3	2	16	8	+8	18	
4	Adelaide Sensation	10	3	0	7	12	23	−11	9	
5	Northern NSW Pride	10	2	1	7	15	32	−17	7	
6	Victoria Vision	10	1	1	8	5	28	−23	4	

Source: OzFootball
Rules for classification: 1) points; 2) goal difference; 3) number of goals scored.

=== Results ===
Home \ Away	ADE	CAN	NOR	NSW	QLD	VIC
Adelaide Sensation		0–1	2–4	0–2	1–0	4–1
Canberra Eclipse	3–0		3–1	1–4	1–1	2–0
Northern NSW Pride	1–3	0–5		2–4	1–4	3–0
NSW Sapphires	6–1	2–1	5–1		3–0	10–0
Queensland Sting	3–0	1–1	4–0	1–1		1–0
Victoria Vision	2–1	0–2	2–2	0–2	0–1	

Source: OzFootball
Legend: Blue = home team win; Yellow = draw; Red = away team win.

== Grand final ==
9 March 2002

NSW Sapphires	0–1	Canberra Eclipse
	Report	Munoz 66'

Parramatta Stadium, Sydney

== Awards ==
Award	Winner	Club
Julie Dolan Medal	(Australia) Joanne Peters	NSW Sapphires
Golden Boot	(Australia) Caitlin Munoz	Canberra Eclipse
Rising Star	(Australia) Lisa De Vanna	Adelaide Sensation

Ref.
