= 2013 Judo Grand Prix Abu Dhabi =

Judo competition

Judo 2013 Judo Grand Prix Abu Dhabi
- Location: Abu Dhabi, United Arab Emirates
- Dates: 22–23 November 2013
- Competitors: 236 from 35 nations

Competition at external databases
- Links: IJF • JudoInside

The 2013 Judo Grand Prix Abu Dhabi was held in Abu Dhabi, United Arab Emirates from 22 to 23 November 2013.

== Medal summary ==
=== Men's events ===
Event	Gold	Silver	Bronze
Extra-lightweight (−60 kg)	Beslan Mudranov (RUS)	Sharafuddin Lutfillaev (UZB)	Arsen Galstyan (RUS)
Extra-lightweight (−60 kg)	Beslan Mudranov (RUS)	Sharafuddin Lutfillaev (UZB)	Orkhan Safarov (AZE)
Half-lightweight (−66 kg)	Mikhail Pulyaev (RUS)	Nijat Shikhalizada (AZE)	Alim Gadanov (RUS)
Half-lightweight (−66 kg)	Mikhail Pulyaev (RUS)	Nijat Shikhalizada (AZE)	Sugoi Uriarte (ESP)
Lightweight (−73 kg)	Victor Scvortov (UAE)	Mansur Isaev (RUS)	Mirali Sharipov (UZB)
Lightweight (−73 kg)	Victor Scvortov (UAE)	Mansur Isaev (RUS)	Miklós Ungvári (HUN)
Half-middleweight (−81 kg)	Sergiu Toma (UAE)	Sven Maresch (GER)	Yakhyo Imamov (UZB)
Half-middleweight (−81 kg)	Sergiu Toma (UAE)	Sven Maresch (GER)	Sirazhudin Magomedov (RUS)
Middleweight (−90 kg)	Walter Facente (ITA)	Noël van 't End (NED)	Kirill Denisov (RUS)
Middleweight (−90 kg)	Walter Facente (ITA)	Noël van 't End (NED)	Ramin Gurbanov (AZE)
Half-heavyweight (−100 kg)	Dimitri Peters (GER)	Martin Pacek (SWE)	Karl-Richard Frey (GER)
Half-heavyweight (−100 kg)	Dimitri Peters (GER)	Martin Pacek (SWE)	Soyib Kurbonov (UZB)
Heavyweight (+100 kg)	Aslan Kambiev (RUS)	Roy Meyer (NED)	Boltoboy Baltaev (UZB)
Heavyweight (+100 kg)	Aslan Kambiev (RUS)	Roy Meyer (NED)	André Breitbarth (GER)

=== Women's events ===
Event	Gold	Silver	Bronze
Extra-lightweight (−48 kg)	Amandine Buchard (FRA)	Alesya Kuznetsova (RUS)	Valentina Moscatt (ITA)
Extra-lightweight (−48 kg)	Amandine Buchard (FRA)	Alesya Kuznetsova (RUS)	Mönkhbatyn Urantsetseg (MGL)
Half-lightweight (−52 kg)	Yulia Kazarina (RUS)	Laura Gómez (ESP)	Pénélope Bonna (FRA)
Half-lightweight (−52 kg)	Yulia Kazarina (RUS)	Laura Gómez (ESP)	Andreea Chițu (ROU)
Lightweight (−57 kg)	Miryam Roper (GER)	Corina Căprioriu (ROU)	Liu Yang (CHN)
Lightweight (−57 kg)	Miryam Roper (GER)	Corina Căprioriu (ROU)	Telma Monteiro (POR)
Half-middleweight (−63 kg)	Kathrin Unterwurzacher (AUT)	Clarisse Agbegnenou (FRA)	Hannah Martin (USA)
Half-middleweight (−63 kg)	Kathrin Unterwurzacher (AUT)	Clarisse Agbegnenou (FRA)	Anicka van Emden (NED)
Middleweight (−70 kg)	Kim Polling (NED)	Jennifer Pitzanti (ITA)	Sally Conway (GBR)
Middleweight (−70 kg)	Kim Polling (NED)	Jennifer Pitzanti (ITA)	Margaux Pinot (FRA)
Half-heavyweight (−78 kg)	Audrey Tcheuméo (FRA)	Natalie Powell (GBR)	Anastasiya Dmitrieva (RUS)
Half-heavyweight (−78 kg)	Audrey Tcheuméo (FRA)	Natalie Powell (GBR)	Alena Kachorovskaya (RUS)
Heavyweight (+78 kg)	Franziska Konitz (GER)	Sonia Asselah (ALG)	Émilie Andéol (FRA)
Heavyweight (+78 kg)	Franziska Konitz (GER)	Sonia Asselah (ALG)	Anaid Mkhitaryan (RUS)

Source Results

=== Medal table ===
* Host nation (United Arab Emirates)

Rank	Nation	Gold	Silver	Bronze	Total
1	Russia (RUS)	4	2	7	13
2	Germany (GER)	3	1	2	6
3	France (FRA)	2	1	3	6
4	United Arab Emirates (UAE)*	2	0	0	2
5	Netherlands (NED)	1	2	1	4
6	Italy (ITA)	1	1	1	3
7	Austria (AUT)	1	0	0	1
8	Uzbekistan (UZB)	0	1	4	5
9	Azerbaijan (AZE)	0	1	2	3
10	Great Britain (GBR)	0	1	1	2
10	Romania (ROU)	0	1	1	2
10	Spain (ESP)	0	1	1	2
13	Algeria (ALG)	0	1	0	1
13	Sweden (SWE)	0	1	0	1
15	China (CHN)	0	0	1	1
15	Hungary (HUN)	0	0	1	1
15	Mongolia (MGL)	0	0	1	1
15	Portugal (POR)	0	0	1	1
15	United States (USA)	0	0	1	1
Totals (19 entries)		14	14	28	56
