= Jin Suk-hee =

South Korean footballer (born 1978)

Personal information
- Date of birth: 9 July 1978 (age 48)
- Position: Defender

Youth career
- 1994-1996: Hyundai Girls' High School
- 1997-1998: Ulsan College

Senior career*
Years	Team	Apps	(Gls)
1999-2008	INI Steel		

International career^{‡}
1995-2006	South Korea	73	(2)
- * Club domestic league appearances and goals ‡ National team caps and goals as of 04:53, 19 March 2026 (UTC)

Jin Suk-hee (Korean: 진숙희; born 9 July 1978) is a South Korean former footballer and coach. She played as a defender for INI Steel and the South Korea women's national football team. Jin is manager of the women's football academy at Ulsan College.

== Club career ==
As a youth, Jin played for Hyundai Girls' High School. In 1996, she scored two of the team's five goals in the semi-final of the National High Schools' Football Championship. Hyundai lost to Wiryesang High School in the final but Jin received the tournament's top goalscorer award for her four goals in total. Jin played for Ulsan College for two years before joining INI Steel in 1999.

Jin was a key player for INI Steel at a time when they dominated South Korea's women's football scene. Early in her first season at the club, she scored against her former team, Ulsan College, in the final of the Queen's Cup, helping to seal a second consecutive title for INI Steel. In the same year, the club was also victorious at the President's Cup, Korea Expressway Corporation Cup, and in both the spring and fall editions of the Korean Women's League.

In 2003 Jin scored two of INI Steel's five goals against Daekyo Kangaroos in the final of the Unification Cup, helping her team win their third consecutive title. Jin was club captain for a time, leading her team to victory in the 2004 KWFF Fall Women's Football Championship and the 2004 Queen's Cup, where she was also named MVP. She was the top goalscorer as her team, by now known as Hyundai Steel, lifted the trophy at the 2006 National Women's Football Championship, and received the best defender award at the 2007 Unification Cup, in which Hyundai finished as runners-up.

== International career ==
Jin made her international debut for South Korea as a teenager at the 1995 AFC Women's Championship. She scored her first international goal in 1998 against Japan in a friendly match ahead of the 1998 Asian Games. Jin provided an assist against China at the 2001 Toto Cup to help deliver the South Korean women's team's first ever victory in an international tournament.

As a regular fixture of the national team in the late 1990s and early 2000s, Jin also played at the AFC Women's Championship in 1999, 2001 and 2003. At the 2003 tournament, South Korea finished in third place to qualify for the FIFA Women's World Cup for the first time.

She was part of the South Korean team at the 2003 World Cup. In 2005, she was part of the squad that lifted the trophy at the first EAFF Women's Football Championship, beating China and North Korea for the first time in 15 years. Jin wore the captain's armband at the 2006 AFC Women's Asian Cup in Australia, where she scored her second international goal in a group stage match against Myanmar.

== Coaching career ==
When the WK League launched in 2009, Jin was a coach with military side Sangmu, at the time the only team in the league with an all-female staff. While coaching at Sangmu, Jin made a surprise appearance at the 2012 WK League all-star match.

In 2024 Jin was appointed manager of the women's football academy at her alma mater, Ulsan College. As manager, Jin has emphasised the role of analysis and direct feedback, notably bringing analyst Kim Bom-bom into her coaching team. She led Ulsan to victory at the 2025 KWFF Fall Women's Football Championship, and received the Best Manager award at the tournament.

== Career statistics ==
=== International ===
As of match played 13 December 2006

Appearances and goals by national team and year
National team	Year	Apps	Goals
South Korea	1995	4	0
South Korea	1996	1	0
South Korea	1997	0	0
South Korea	1998	5	1
South Korea	1999	8	0
South Korea	2000	4	0
South Korea	2001	5	0
South Korea	2002	10	0
South Korea	2003	18	0
South Korea	2004	4	0
South Korea	2005	4	0
South Korea	2006	10	1
Total		73	2

Scores and results list South Korea's goal tally first, score column indicates score after each Jin Suk-hee goal.

List of international goals scored by Jin Suk-hee
No.	Date	Venue	Opponent	Score	Result	Competition	Ref.
1	26 October 1998	Misari Field, Hanam, South Korea	Japan	1-0	1-1	Friendly	
2	22 July 2006	Hindmarsh Stadium, Adelaide, Australia	Myanmar	2–0	3–1	2006 AFC Women's Asian Cup	

== Honours ==
=== INI Steel ===
- Korean Women's League
  - Champions: 1999–1, 1999–2,
  - Runners-up: 2000–1, 2001
- National Women's Football Championship
  - Champions: 2004, 2006, 2008
  - Runners-up: 2002
- KWFF Spring Women's Football Championship
  - Champions: 2003, 2004, 2005, 2006
  - Runners-up: 2002, 2008
- KWFF Fall Women's Football Championship
  - Champions: 2004, 2005, 2006
  - Runners-up: 2002, 2008
- Queen's Cup
  - Champions: 1999, 2000, 2003, 2004, 2005, 2006, 2007
  - Runners-up: 2001
- President's Cup
  - Champions: 1999, 2001, 2002
  - Runners-up: 2000
- Unification Cup
  - Champions: 2001, 2002, 2003, 2005, 2006
  - Runners-up: 2004, 2007, 2008
- Korea Expressway Corporation National Women's Football Championship
  - Champions: 1999, 2000, 2001
- National Sports Festival
  - Champions: 2001, 2002, 2003
  - Runners-up: 2004

=== South Korea ===
- 2001 Toto Cup champions
- 2003 AFC Women's Championship third place
- 2005 EAFF Women's Cup champions

=== Individual ===
- 2004 Queen's Cup MVP
- 2006 National Women's Football Championship top goalscorer
- 2007 Unification Cup best defender
- 2024 KWFF Spring Women's Football Championship excellent manager (university team)
- 2025 KWFF Fall Women's Football Championship best manager (university team)
