= Alim Gadanov =

Russian judoka (born 1983)

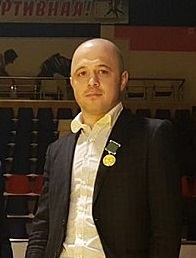

Personal information
- Born: 20 October 1983 (age 42)
- Occupation: Judoka

Sport
- Country: Russia
- Sport: Judo
- Weight class: –66 kg

Achievements and titles
- Olympic Games: 5th (2008)
- World Champ.: 5th (2009)
- European Champ.: (gold) (2012)
Medal record
Men's judo
Representing Russia
European Championships
Gold medal – first place	2012 Chelyabinsk	–66 kg
Bronze medal – third place	2008 Lisbon	–66 kg
Bronze medal – third place	2009 Tbilisi	–66 kg
Bronze medal – third place	2011 Istanbul	–66 kg
World Masters
Silver medal – second place	2010 Suwon	–66 kg
IJF Grand Slam
Gold medal – first place	2009 Rio de Janeiro	–66 kg
Gold medal – first place	2010 Rio de Janeiro	–66 kg
Gold medal – first place	2011 Moscow	–66 kg
Bronze medal – third place	2010 Moscow	–66 kg
Bronze medal – third place	2016 Tyumen	–73 kg
IJF Grand Prix
Gold medal – first place	2010 Qingdao	–66 kg
Gold medal – first place	2011 Qingdao	–66 kg
Gold medal – first place	2012 Düsseldorf	–66 kg
Gold medal – first place	2013 Qingdao	–66 kg
Silver medal – second place	2010 Abu Dhabi	–66 kg
Silver medal – second place	2014 Zagreb	–66 kg
Bronze medal – third place	2013 Abu Dhabi	–66 kg
Bronze medal – third place	2014 Düsseldorf	–66 kg
Bronze medal – third place	2014 Tbilisi	–66 kg
Bronze medal – third place	2014 Havana	–66 kg
European U23 Championships
Silver medal – second place	2005 Kyiv	–66 kg

Profile at external databases
- IJF: 357
- JudoInside.com: 37290
- Updated on 14 November 2022

Alim Gadanov (born 20 October 1983) is a Russian judoka.

== Achievements ==
Year	Tournament	Place	Weight class
2012	European Judo Championships	1st	Half lightweight (–66 kg)
2011	European Judo Championships	3rd	Half lightweight (–66 kg)
2009	European Judo Championships	3rd	Half lightweight (–66 kg)
2008	2008 Summer Olympics	5th	Half lightweight (–66 kg)
2008	European Judo Championships	3rd	Half lightweight (–66 kg)
