= Mirali Sharipov =

Uzbekistani judoka (born 1987)

Personal information
- Born: 30 October 1987 (age 38) Bukhara, Buxoro, Uzbek SSR, Soviet Union
- Occupation: Judoka
- Height: 173 cm (5 ft 8 in)

Sport
- Country: Uzbekistan
- Sport: Judo
- Weight class: ‍–‍66 kg, ‍–‍73 kg

Achievements and titles
- Olympic Games: 5th (2008)
- World Champ.: 7th (2009)
- Asian Champ.: (bronze) (2008, 2016)
Medal record
Men's judo
Representing Uzbekistan
Asian Championships
Bronze medal – third place	2008 Jeju	‍–‍66 kg
Bronze medal – third place	2016 Tashkent	‍–‍73 kg
World Masters
Bronze medal – third place	2013 Tyumen	‍–‍73 kg
IJF Grand Slam
Gold medal – first place	2016 Baku	‍–‍73 kg
Bronze medal – third place	2012 Moscow	‍–‍73 kg
IJF Grand Prix
Gold medal – first place	2013 Tashkent	‍–‍73 kg
Gold medal – first place	2015 Tashkent	‍–‍73 kg
Silver medal – second place	2011 Baku	‍–‍73 kg
Silver medal – second place	2012 Baku	‍–‍73 kg
Bronze medal – third place	2013 Abu Dhabi	‍–‍73 kg
Bronze medal – third place	2015 Qingdao	‍–‍73 kg

Profile at external databases
- IJF: 698
- JudoInside.com: 40341
- Updated on 20 November 2022

Mirali Sharipov (Uzbek: Мирали Шарипов; born 30 October 1987) is an Uzbekistani judoka, who competes in the half-lightweight category. He is a two-time World Cup champion and a bronze medalist at the 2008 Asian Judo Championships in Jeju City, South Korea.

Sharipov represented Uzbekistan at the 2008 Summer Olympics in Beijing, where he competed for the men's half-lightweight class (66 kg). He defeated Spain's Óscar Peñas and Algeria's Mounir Benamadi in the preliminary rounds, before losing the quarterfinal match, by a waza-ari awasete ippon (two points), to Japan's Masato Uchishiba. Because his opponent advanced further into the final match, Sharipov was offered another shot for the bronze medal by defeating Iran's Arash Miresmaeili, and Egypt's Aheen El Hady in the repechage rounds. He finished only in fifth place, after losing out the bronze medal match to North Korea's Pak Chol-Min, who successfully scored a waza-ari awasete ippon and a kesa-gatame (scarf hold), one second before the five-minute period had ended.
