= Jacqueline Brooks =

Canadian dressage rider

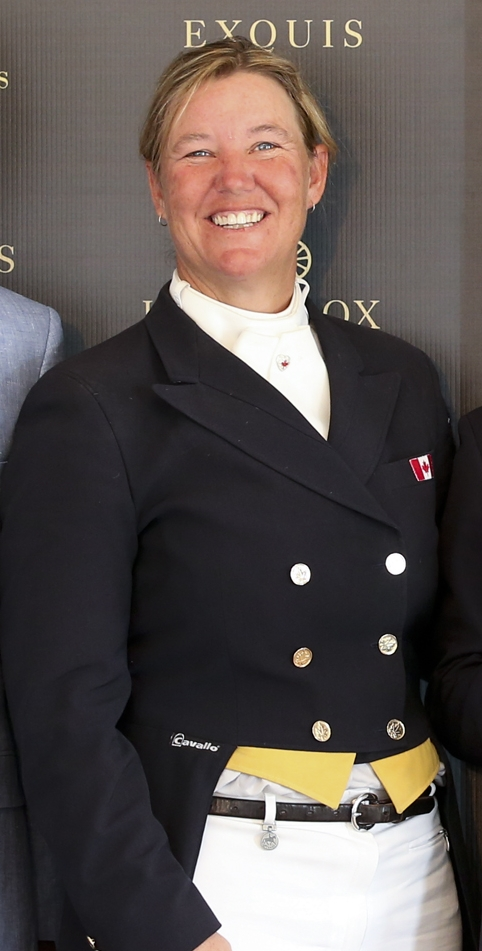

Personal information
- Born: September 15, 1967 (age 58) Edmonton, Alberta
Medal record
Equestrian
Representing Canada
Pan American Games
| Silver medal – second place | 2003 Santo Domingo | Team dressage |

Jacqueline "Jacquie" Brooks (born September 15, 1967, in Edmonton, Alberta) is an Olympic dressage rider. Representing Canada, she competed at two Summer Olympics (in 2008 and 2012).

Jacqueline's best Olympic results came in 2008, when she placed 8th in team dressage and 29th in individual dressage. She also competed at two editions of Dressage World Cup Finals (in 2007 and 2013).
