= Courtney King-Dye =

American equestrian

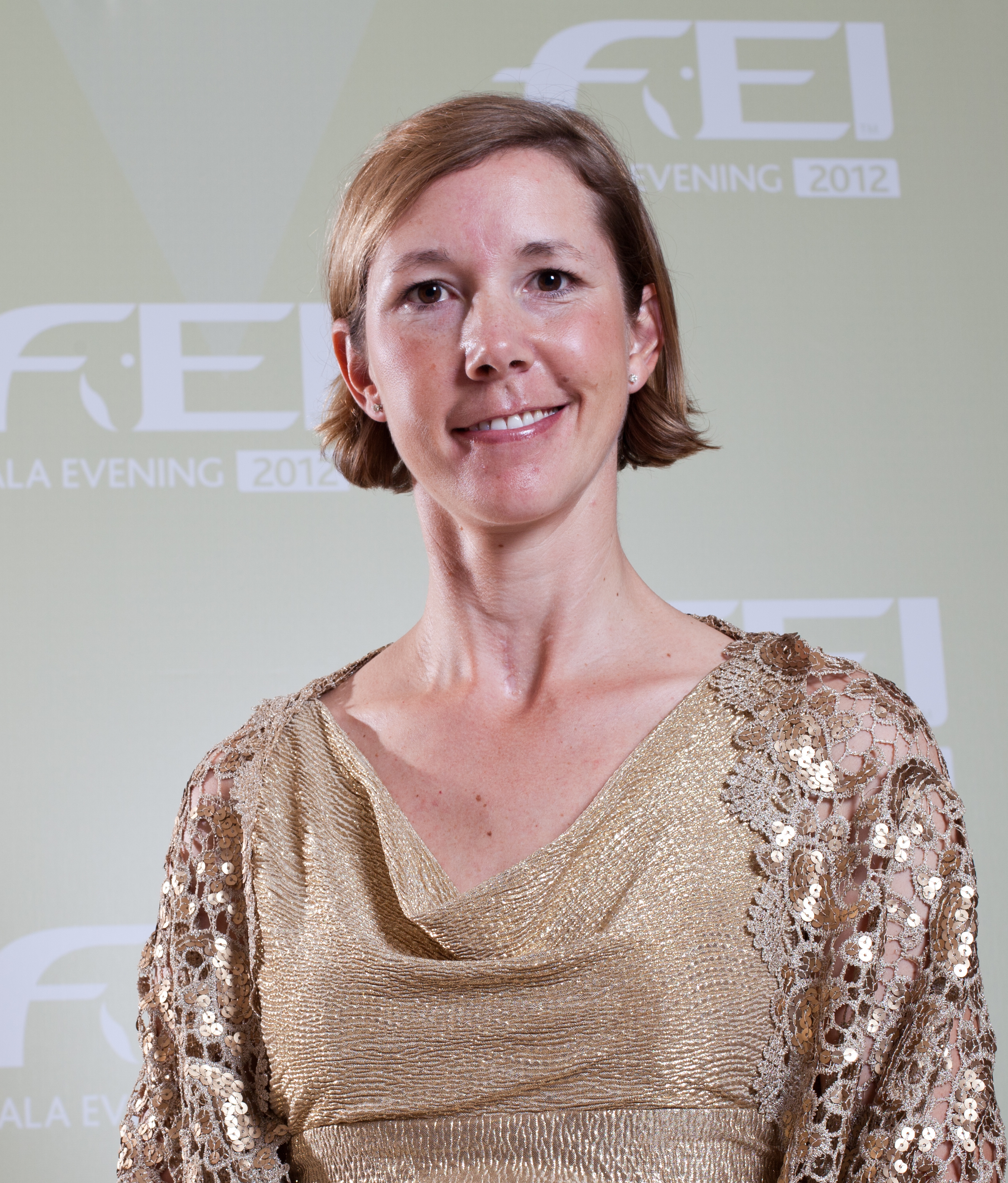
- Courtney King-Dye in 2012

Personal information
- Discipline: Dressage
- Born: November 20, 1977 (age 48); Saginaw, Michigan, United States

Courtney King-Dye (born November 20, 1977) is an American equestrian. She competed in two events at the 2008 Summer Olympics.

== Career ==
King-Dye became a student of Olympic equestrian Lendon Gray at age 17. She graduated from Columbia University in 2004.

She competed in the 2008 Summer Olympics, originally placing 13th in the individual competition and fourth in the team event. King-Dye and the U.S. dressage team were however disqualified after her horse tested positive for felbinac.

In February 2010, King-Dye was awarded the Carol Lavell Advanced Dressage Prize by the Dressage Foundation.

=== Accident ===
King-Dye had a training accident in March 2010, suffering a traumatic brain injury and falling into a four-week-long coma. She had to re-learn walking and speaking. King-Dye won the FEI Against All Odds Award in 2012. King-Dye used a combination of therapeutic riding and hippotherapy in her recovery process. She returned to riding with a goal to become a para-dressage rider. In 2012, she competed in the Houston Dressage Society Spring Classic I & II CPEDI3* in Katy, TX, where she placed first in one of her classes in the Grade Ia Team Test Competition and qualified for the U.S. Paralympic team trials.

After recovering, King-Dye became an advocate for the use of helmets in dressage. In 2014 she received the Charles Owen Equestrian Role Model Award for this activist work.

== Personal life ==
King-Dye is married to Jason Dye; they have two daughters, born in 2014 and 2016.
