= 2010 Judo Grand Prix Qingdao =

Judo competition

Judo 2010 Judo Grand Prix Qingdao
- Location: Qingdao, China
- Dates: 17–18 December 2010
- Competitors: 245 from 31 nations

Competition at external databases
- Links: IJF • JudoInside

The 2010 Judo Grand Prix Qingdao was held in Qingdao, China, from 17 to 18 December 2010.

== Medal summary ==
=== Men's events ===
Event	Gold	Silver	Bronze
Extra-lightweight (−60 kg)	Ganbatyn Boldbaatar (MGL)	Beslan Mudranov (RUS)	Arsen Galstyan (RUS)
Extra-lightweight (−60 kg)	Ganbatyn Boldbaatar (MGL)	Beslan Mudranov (RUS)	He Yunlong (CHN)
Half-lightweight (−66 kg)	Alim Gadanov (RUS)	Kamal Khan-Magomedov (RUS)	Khishigbayar Buuveibaatar (MGL)
Half-lightweight (−66 kg)	Alim Gadanov (RUS)	Kamal Khan-Magomedov (RUS)	Leandro Cunha (BRA)
Lightweight (−73 kg)	Ugo Legrand (FRA)	Murat Kodzokov (RUS)	Benjamin Darbelet (FRA)
Lightweight (−73 kg)	Ugo Legrand (FRA)	Murat Kodzokov (RUS)	Mansur Isaev (RUS)
Half-middleweight (−81 kg)	Sirazhudin Magomedov (RUS)	Li Maojian (CHN)	Tomislav Marijanović (CRO)
Half-middleweight (−81 kg)	Sirazhudin Magomedov (RUS)	Li Maojian (CHN)	Travis Stevens (USA)
Middleweight (−90 kg)	Kirill Denisov (RUS)	Kim Kwang-ho (KOR)	Lorenzo Bagnoli (ITA)
Middleweight (−90 kg)	Kirill Denisov (RUS)	Kim Kwang-ho (KOR)	Marcus Nyman (SWE)
Half-heavyweight (−100 kg)	Sergei Samoilovich (RUS)	Battulgyn Temüülen (MGL)	Ryunosuke Haga (JPN)
Half-heavyweight (−100 kg)	Sergei Samoilovich (RUS)	Battulgyn Temüülen (MGL)	Martin Pacek (SWE)
Heavyweight (+100 kg)	Islam El Shehaby (EGY)	Daniel Hernandes (BRA)	Dmitry Sterkhov (RUS)
Heavyweight (+100 kg)	Islam El Shehaby (EGY)	Daniel Hernandes (BRA)	Rafael Silva (BRA)

=== Women's events ===
Event	Gold	Silver	Bronze
Extra-lightweight (−48 kg)	Wu Shugen (CHN)	Laëtitia Payet (FRA)	Baljinnyamyn Bat-Erdene (MGL)
Extra-lightweight (−48 kg)	Wu Shugen (CHN)	Laëtitia Payet (FRA)	Mönkhbatyn Urantsetseg (MGL)
Half-lightweight (−52 kg)	Priscilla Gneto (FRA)	Chiho Kagaya (JPN)	Laura Gómez (ESP)
Half-lightweight (−52 kg)	Priscilla Gneto (FRA)	Chiho Kagaya (JPN)	Sun Rong (CHN)
Lightweight (−57 kg)	Nae Udaka (JPN)	Automne Pavia (FRA)	Hannah Brueck (GER)
Lightweight (−57 kg)	Nae Udaka (JPN)	Automne Pavia (FRA)	Sarah Loko (FRA)
Half-middleweight (−63 kg)	Rina Kozawa (JPN)	Yarden Gerbi (ISR)	Lin Meiling (CHN)
Half-middleweight (−63 kg)	Rina Kozawa (JPN)	Yarden Gerbi (ISR)	Xu Yuhua (CHN)
Middleweight (−70 kg)	Linda Bolder (NED)	Chen Fei (CHN)	Lee Na-ra (KOR)
Middleweight (−70 kg)	Linda Bolder (NED)	Chen Fei (CHN)	Marie Pasquet (FRA)
Half-heavyweight (−78 kg)	Yang Xiuli (CHN)	Tomomi Okamura (JPN)	Annika Heise (GER)
Half-heavyweight (−78 kg)	Yang Xiuli (CHN)	Tomomi Okamura (JPN)	Marhinde Verkerk (NED)
Heavyweight (+78 kg)	Yu Song (CHN)	Liu Huanyuan (CHN)	Éva Bisséni (FRA)
Heavyweight (+78 kg)	Yu Song (CHN)	Liu Huanyuan (CHN)	Qin Qian (CHN)

Source Results

=== Medal table ===
* Host nation (China)

Rank	Nation	Gold	Silver	Bronze	Total
1	Russia (RUS)	4	3	3	10
2	China (CHN)*	3	3	5	11
3	France (FRA)	2	2	4	8
4	Japan (JPN)	2	2	1	5
5	Mongolia (MGL)	1	1	3	5
6	Netherlands (NED)	1	0	1	2
7	Egypt (EGY)	1	0	0	1
8	Brazil (BRA)	0	1	2	3
9	South Korea (KOR)	0	1	1	2
10	Israel (ISR)	0	1	0	1
11	Germany (GER)	0	0	2	2
11	Sweden (SWE)	0	0	2	2
13	Croatia (CRO)	0	0	1	1
13	Italy (ITA)	0	0	1	1
13	Spain (ESP)	0	0	1	1
13	United States (USA)	0	0	1	1
Totals (16 entries)		14	14	28	56
