= 2006 AFC Women's Asian Cup =

Tournament details
- Host country: Australia
- City: Adelaide
- Dates: 16–30 July
- Teams: 9 (from 1 confederation)
- Venue(s): Hindmarsh Stadium; Marden Sports Complex

Final positions
- Champions: China (8th title)
- Runners-up: Australia
- Third place: North Korea
- Fourth place: Japan

Tournament statistics
- Matches played: 20
- Goals scored: 77 (3.85 per match)
- Top scorer(s): (Japan) Yūki Nagasato (South Korea) Jung Jung-suk (7 goals)

The 2006 AFC Women's Asian Cup was a women's football tournament for women's national teams from countries affiliated to the Asian Football Confederation. It was the 15th installment of the AFC Women's Asian Cup.

Unlike the previous tournament which was held every two years, the tournament was moved back a year to 2006. The structure of the competition changed for this tournament, with a qualifying tournament and a separate championship tournament.

The four qualifiers of the sub-tournament (Vietnam, Chinese Taipei, Myanmar, Thailand) went on to compete for the Championship proper against the four automatic finalists (China, Japan, South Korea and North Korea). Australia were added to the final tournament following their switch from Oceania Football Confederation to the Asian confederation. The finals of the tournament were held in Australia in July 2006 - the hosting rights were originally given to Japan, but after Australia moved conferences, they were given the hosting rights. All matches in the main tournament were held in Adelaide.

The tournament also acted as Asia's qualifying tournament for the 2007 Women's World Cup. Two spots were available in addition to the automatic spot given to China as World Cup hosts. China won the tournament, beating hosts Australia in the final. Thus, Australia took the first qualifying spot, while North Korea defeated Japan in the third place play-off to take second place. Despite beating China in the group stages, Japan then played off with the third-placed team in the CONCACAF region, Mexico, who they beat over two legs to qualify for the tournament. This tournament would also mark the first time an Australian national team (senior or youth) would officially compete as an Asian side on the international stage.

== Teams ==
Japan, China, North Korea and South Korea qualified by virtue of occupying the four top spots in the 2003 AFC Women's Championship.

- Australia
- China
- Chinese Taipei
- Japan
- North Korea
- South Korea
- Myanmar
- Thailand
- Vietnam

== Venues ==
The tournament was held in Adelaide, South Australia, with Hindmarsh Stadium being the main venue, hosting all matches except for one of the two concurrent last matches in each of the two groups, which were held at Marden Sports Complex.

Hindmarsh Stadium
Capacity: 16,500
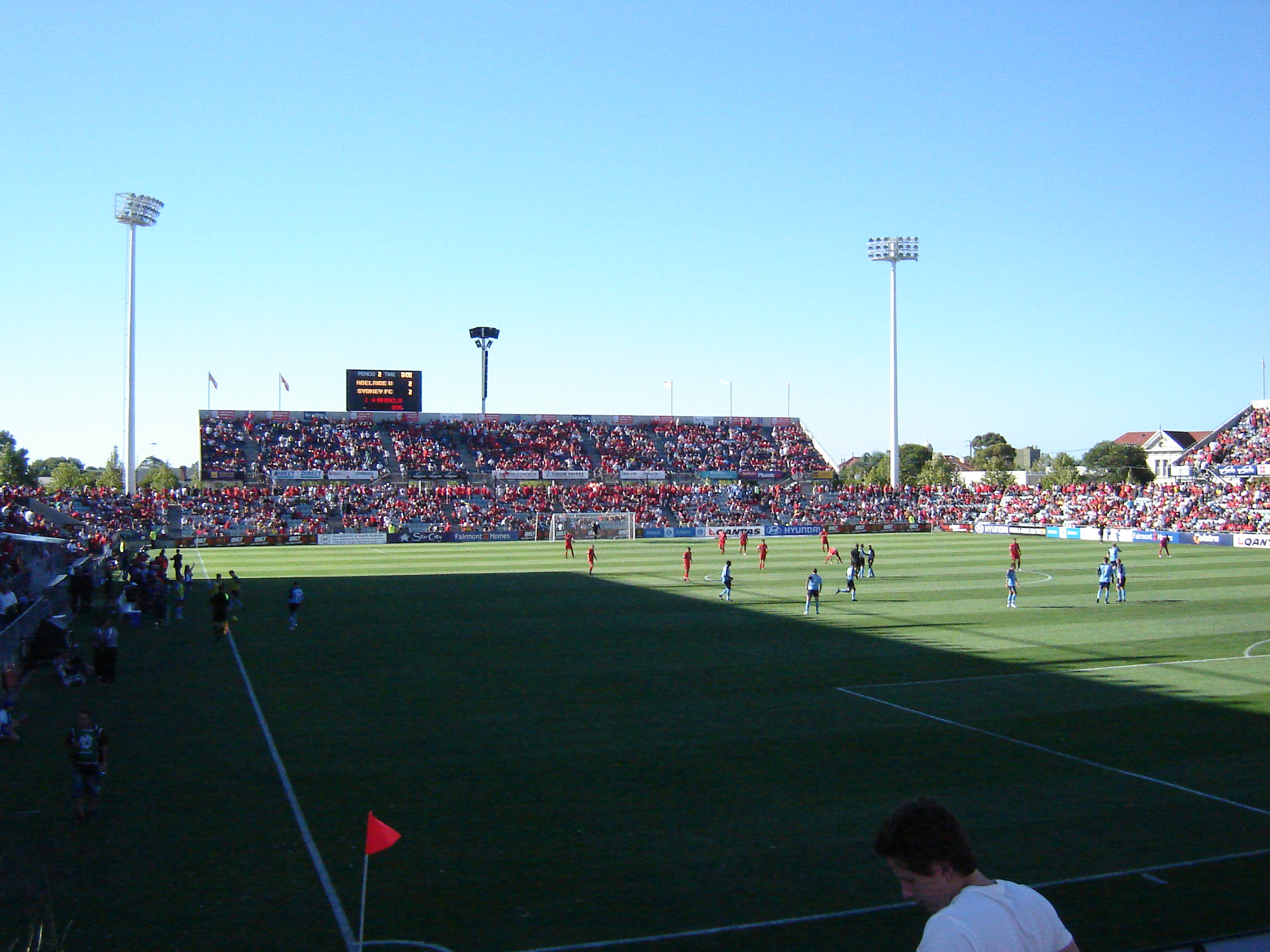
Marden Sports Complex
Capacity: 6,000
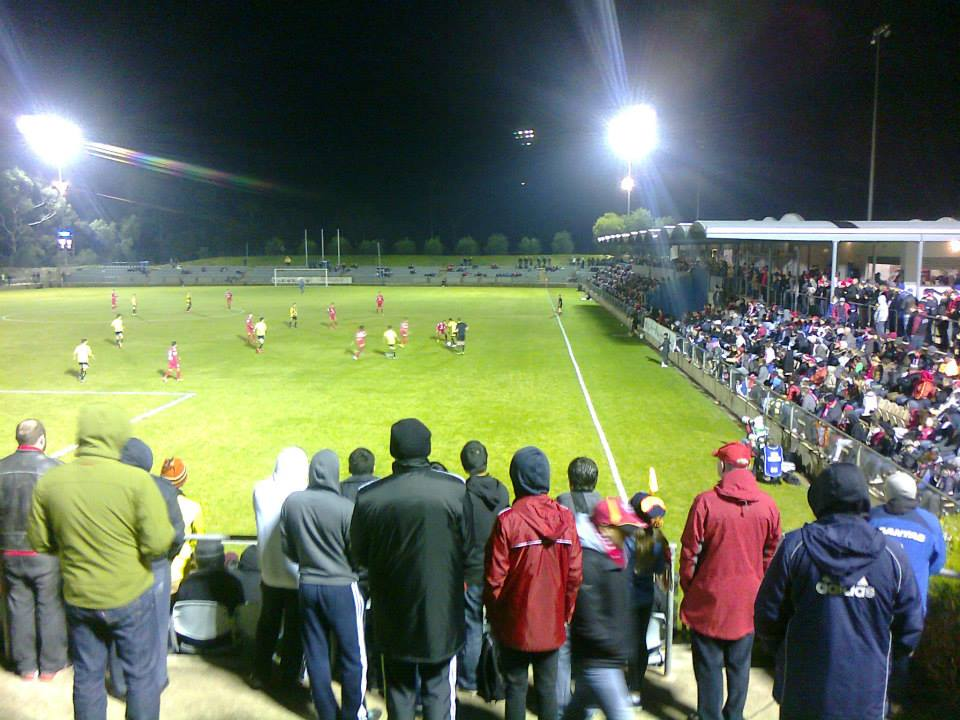

== Group stage ==
All matches in the group stage were held at Hindmarsh Stadium, except the Chinese Taipei v Vietnam and Thailand v Australia matches, which took place at Marden Sports Complex.

=== Group A ===
Team	Pld	W	D	L	GF	GA	GD	Pts
Japan	3	3	0	0	17	1	+16	9
China	3	2	0	1	4	1	+3	6
Vietnam	3	1	0	2	1	7	−6	3
Chinese Taipei	3	0	0	3	1	14	−13	0

Source: RSSSF
19 July 2006
12:00

China	2–0	Chinese Taipei
Han Duan 11'; Pu Wei 64'	Report

Hindmarsh Stadium, Adelaide
Attendance: 500
Referee: Pannipar Kamnueng (Thailand)
19 July 2006
14:30

Japan	5–0	Vietnam
Sawa 39', 52'; Sakaguchi 65', 78'; Nagasato 81'	Report

Hindmarsh Stadium, Adelaide
Attendance: 500
Referee: Tammy Ogston (Australia)

21 July 2006
16:30

Japan	11–1	Chinese Taipei
Ohno 9'; Nagasato 29', 33', 46', 71', 90+2'; Sawa 38', 80'; Sakaguchi 48', 89'; Yanagita 68'	Report	Hsieh I-ling 35'

Hindmarsh Stadium, Adelaide
Attendance: 200
Referee: Ri Hong-sil (North Korea)
21 July 2006
19:00

Vietnam	0–2	China
	Report	Ma Xiaoxu 20', 58'

Hindmarsh Stadium, Adelaide
Attendance: 300
Referee: Hong Eun-ah (Korea Republic)

23 July 2006
14:30

China	0–1	Japan
	Report	Miyama 18'

Hindmarsh Stadium, Adelaide
Attendance: 5,000
Referee: Tammy Ogston (Australia)
23 July 2006
14:30

Chinese Taipei	0–1	Vietnam
	Report	Vũ Thị Huyền Linh 70'

Marden Sports Complex, Adelaide
Attendance: 200
Referee: Ri Hong-sil (North Korea)

=== Group B ===
Team	Pld	W	D	L	GF	GA	GD	Pts
North Korea	4	3	1	0	13	0	+13	10
Australia	4	3	1	0	11	0	+11	10
South Korea	4	2	0	2	14	6	+8	6
Thailand	4	1	0	3	2	26	−24	3
Myanmar	4	0	0	4	2	10	−8	0

Source: RSSSF
16 July 2006
12:00

Myanmar	1–2	Thailand
Daw My Nilar Htwe 60'	Report	Pitsamai 34', 55'

Hindmarsh Stadium, Adelaide
Attendance: 200
Referee: Huijun Niu (China)
16 July 2006
14:30

Australia	4–0	South Korea
Shin Sun-nam 30' (o.g.); Walsh 66'; Munoz 75'; De Vanna 87'	Report

Hindmarsh Stadium, Adelaide
Attendance: 3,000
Referee: Bentla D'Coth (India)

18 July 2006
12:00

Thailand	0–9	North Korea
	Report	Ri Kum-suk 8', 34'; Ri Un-suk 31'; Kim Than-sil 36', 73'; Ho Sun-hui 43'; Jo Yun-mi 59'; Kim Yong-ae 67', 87'

Hindmarsh Stadium, Adelaide
Attendance: 200
Referee: Mayumi Oiwa (Japan)
18 July 2006
14:30

Myanmar	0–2	Australia
	Report	Shipard 31'; De Vanna 77'

Hindmarsh Stadium, Adelaide
Attendance: 2,000
Referee: Dongqing Zhang (China)

20 July 2006
12:00

North Korea	3–0	Myanmar
Ri Un-suk 23', 37'; Ri Un-gyong 85'	Report

Hindmarsh Stadium, Adelaide
Attendance: 150
Referee: Bentla D'Coth (India)
20 July 2006
14:30

South Korea	11–0	Thailand
Cha Yun-hee 30', 44'; Jung Jung-suk 39', 50', 71', 80', 83', 86'; Kim Joo-hee 42'; Kim Jin-hee 69'; Jung Sey-hwa 87'	Report

Hindmarsh Stadium, Adelaide
Attendance: 200
Referee: Huijun Niu (China)

22 July 2006
16:30

South Korea	3–1	Myanmar
Kim Joo-hee 7'; Jin Suk-hee 35'; Jung Jung-suk 64'	Report	Aye Nandar Hlaing 90'

Hindmarsh Stadium, Adelaide
Attendance: 500
Referee: Dongqing Zhang (China)
22 July 2006
19:00

Australia	0–0	North Korea
	Report

Hindmarsh Stadium, Adelaide
Attendance: 4,000
Referee: Mayumi Oiwa (Japan)

24 July 2006
14:30

Thailand	0–5	Australia
	Report	Ferguson 3'; Burgess 27'; Walsh 53'; Gill 62'; De Vanna 81'

Marden Sports Complex, Adelaide
Attendance: 400
Referee: Hong Eun-ah (South Korea)
24 July 2006
14:30

North Korea	1–0	South Korea
Kim Yong-ae 76'	Report

Hindmarsh Stadium, Adelaide
Attendance: 300
Referee: Pannipar Kamnueng (Thailand)

== Knockout stages ==
Semi-finals
27 July
China	1
North Korea	0
27 July
Australia	2
Japan	0

Final
30 July
China (p)	2 (4)
Australia	2 (2)
Third place
30 July
North Korea	3
Japan	2

=== Semi-finals ===
Winners qualify for the 2007 Women's World Cup.

In the China v North Korea match, China conceded a potential equaliser in injury time, but it was disallowed for offside. The North Koreans reacted by throwing bottles and other objects at the referees, and North Korean goalkeeper Han Hye-yong kicked Italian referee Anna De Toni from behind. Three North Korean players, including Han, were suspended before the third place play-off. North Korea protested the decision, demanding a rematch and a reversal of the suspensions.

27 July 2006
16:30

Australia	2–0	Japan
Munoz 10'; Peters 45'	Report

Hindmarsh Stadium, Adelaide
Attendance: 4,000
Referee: Jenny Palmqvist (Sweden)
27 July 2006
19:30

China	1–0	North Korea
Ma Xiaoxu 58'

Hindmarsh Stadium, Adelaide
Attendance: 1,000
Referee: Anna De Toni (Italy)

=== Third place match ===
As China were automatically qualified as hosts, North Korea qualified for the World Cup as the third-placed team in the tournament. Japan will play off with the third-placed team from the 2006 Women's Gold Cup in the CONCACAF region.

30 July 2006
12:30

Japan	2–3	North Korea
Ando 43'; Nagasato 89'		Ri Un-suk 23'; Ri Un-gyong 33', 39'

Hindmarsh Stadium, Adelaide
Attendance: 1,200
Referee: Tammy Ogston (Australia)

=== Final ===
30 July 2006
15:30

Australia	2–2 (a.e.t.)	China
Munoz 29'; Peters 33'	Report	Han Duan 68'; Ma Xiaoxu 73'
Penalties
McCallum (penalty missed); Shipard (penalty scored); Peters (penalty missed); Ferguson (penalty scored)	2–4	(penalty scored) Ma Xiaoxu; (penalty scored) Bi Yan; (penalty scored) Li Jie; (penalty scored) Han Duan

Hindmarsh Stadium, Adelaide
Attendance: 5,168
Referee: Mayumi Oiwa (Japan)

== Awards ==
2006 AFC Women's Championship winners

China
Eighth title

== Goalscorers ==
There were 77 goals scored in 20 matches, for an average of 3.85 goals per match.

7 goals

- (Japan) Yuki Nagasato
- (South Korea) Jung Jung-suk

4 goals

- (China) Ma Xiaoxu
- (Japan) Homare Sawa
- (Japan) Mizuho Sakaguchi
- (North Korea) Ri Un-suk

3 goals

- (Australia) Caitlin Munoz
- (Australia) Lisa De Vanna
- (North Korea) Kim Yong-ae
- (North Korea) Ri Un-gyong

2 goals

- (Australia) Joanne Peters
- (Australia) Sarah Walsh
- (China) Han Duan
- (South Korea) Cha Yun-hee
- (South Korea) Kim Joo-hye
- (North Korea) Kim Than-sil
- (North Korea) Ri Kum-suk
- (Thailand) Pitsamai Sornsai

1 goal

- (Australia) Alicia Ferguson
- (Australia) Joanne Burgess
- (Australia) Kate Gill
- (Australia) Sally Shipard
- (China) Pu Wei
- (Japan) Aya Miyama
- (Japan) Miyuki Yanagita
- (Japan) Kozue Ando
- (Japan) Shinobu Ohno
- (South Korea) Jin Suk-hee
- (South Korea) Jung Sey-hwa
- (South Korea) Kim Jin-hee
- (Myanmar) Aye Mandar Hliang
- (Myanmar) Daw My Nilar Htwe
- (North Korea) Ho Sun-hui
- (North Korea) Jo Yun-mi
- (Chinese Taipei) Hsieh I-ling
- (Vietnam) Vũ Thị Huyền Linh

1 own goal

- (South Korea) Shin Sun-nam (against Australia)
