= Hikikomi gaeshi =

Judo technique

- Classification: Nage-waza
- Sub classification: Sutemi-waza
- Kodokan: Yes

Technique name
- Rōmaji: Hikikomi gaeshi
- Japanese: 引込返
- English: Pulling-in counter

Hikikomi Gaeshi (引込返), also known as pulling-in counter, is one of the preserved throwing techniques, Habukareta Waza, of judo. It belonged to the fourth group, Yonkyo, of the 1895 Gokyo no Waza lists. It is categorized as a rear sacrifice technique, Ma-sutemi.

== Description ==
This technique is similar to Sumi Gaeshi, except that tori traps one of uke's arms.

== Similar techniques, variants, and aliases ==
English aliases:

Similar techniques:

- Sumi gaeshi
- tomoe nage

== See also ==
- The Canon Of Judo
- Kodokan
- Judo
- List of Kodokan Judo techniques
- Judo technique
- Sumi Gaeshi
- Hikikomori
