= Jang Il-ok =

North Korean footballer (born 1986)

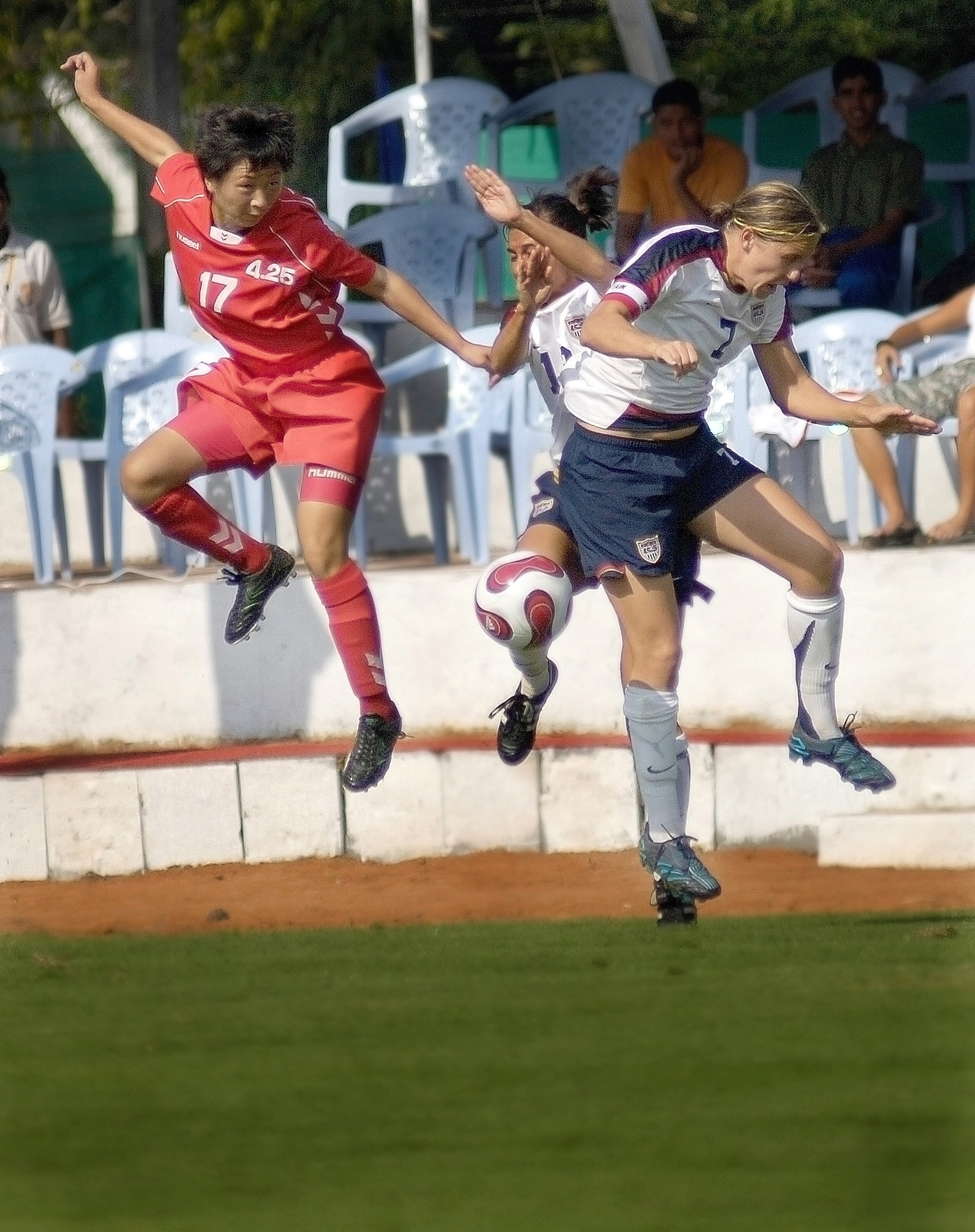
- Jang (left)

Personal information
- Date of birth: 10 October 1986 (age 40)
- Place of birth: North Korea
- Height: 1.64 m (5 ft 5 in)
- Position: Defender

International career
Years	Team	Apps	(Gls)
2008	North Korea	52 (?)	(0)
Korean name
Hangul	장일옥
RR	Jang Ilok
MR	Chang Irok

Jang Il-ok (Korean: 장일옥; pronounced [tsaŋ.i.ɾok̚]; born 10 October 1986) is a female North Korean football defender. She was part of the North Korea women's national football team at the 2008 Summer Olympics.

== See also ==
- North Korea at the 2008 Summer Olympics
