= Marc Boblet =

French dressage rider

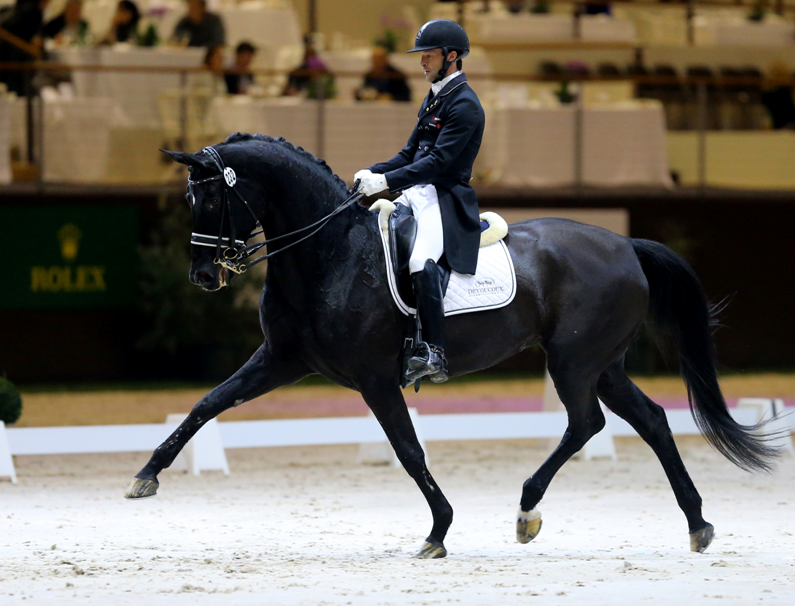
- Marc Boblet and Noble Dream (2016)

Personal information
- Born: September 1, 1971 (age 54)

Marc Boblet (born 1 September 1971) is a French Olympic dressage rider. Representing France, he competed at the 2008 Summer Olympics in Beijing where he finished 20th in the individual competition and 6th in the team competition.

Boblet also competed at 2014 World Equestrian Games and at two European Dressage Championships (in 2009 and 2013). Boblet qualified for the 2014 edition of Dressage World Cup Final, where he achieved 9th place.
