= Jung Jung-suk =

South Korean footballer (1982–2011)

Personal information
- Date of birth: 25 August 1982
- Place of birth: Goseong, South Korea
- Date of death: 26 June 2011 (aged 28)
- Place of death: South Korea
- Height: 1.54 m (5 ft 1/2 in)
- Positions: Midfielder; forward

Youth career
- Ulsan College

Senior career*
Years	Team	Apps	(Gls)
2002–2009	Daekyo Kangaroos		

International career^{‡}
2002–2008	South Korea	30	(9)
- * Club domestic league appearances and goals as of 22 November 2010 ‡ National team caps and goals as of 07:26, 18 May 2026 (UTC)

- Jung Jung-suk
- Hangul: 정정숙
- RR: Jeong Jeongsuk
- MR: Chŏng Chŏngsuk

Jung Jung-suk (Korean: 정정숙, Korean pronunciation: [tɕʌŋ.dʑʌŋ.suk̚] or [tɕʌŋ] [tɕʌŋ.suk̚]; August 25, 1982 – June 26, 2011) was a South Korean women's football player who played for WK League side Daekyo Kangaroos and the South Korean national team.

== Early life ==
Jung was born in Goseong County, South Gyeongsang Province, and competed in athletics before taking up football in her first year at Ulsan Hyundai Girls' High School. After graduating from high school, she continued to play while attending Ulsan College.

== Club career ==
When Daekyo Kangaroos was established in 2002, Jung was recruited as a founding member of the squad. Jung was a key player in Daekyo's victories at domestic tournaments including the 2006 National Sports Festival and the 2007 National Women's Football Championship.

In 2008, Jung scored twice against Japanese side INAC Kobe in a friendly tournament between club teams from South Korea, Japan and China. She also led her team to victory at the 2008 Unification Cup, and the 2008 KWFF Spring Championship, scoring in the final match of the tournament, against Chungnam Ilhwa.

Jung played in the first ever WK League match, between Daekyo and Incheon Hyundai Steel Red Angels, when the league was launched in 2009, shortly after being diagnosed with stomach cancer. As she underwent treatment for her illness, Jung was unable to play and handed over the captaincy to teammate Ryu Ji-eun. Her contract with Daekyo was due to expire in October 2009, but the club told her she would be welcome to return after treatment and recovery, whether as a player or in a different role.

== International career ==
Jung received her first senior call-up for South Korea in 2002, after representing the country at youth level at the 2001 Summer Universiade. She played for her country at the 2002 Asian Games and the 2005 EAFF Women's Football Championship.

Jung scored six goals against Thailand in a match at the 2006 AFC Women's Asian Cup, and she was awarded top scorer at the tournament with seven goals in total. She was also nominated for the 2006 AFC Women's Player of the Year award.

== Death and legacy ==
Jung was diagnosed with stomach cancer in April 2009 and underwent surgery to remove a large part of her stomach. Her father died suddenly later the same year, as her illness continued to spread. Jung died of stomach cancer on June 26, 2011.

When Cha Yun-hee scored for Daekyo in the 2012 WK League championship final, she held up her captain's armband to reveal a message written on the inside reading, "I miss you, Jung Jung-suk in heaven" in memory of her teammate.

== Career statistics ==
List of international goals scored by Jung Jung-suk
No.	Date	Venue	Opponent	Score	Result	Competition	Ref.
1	18 January 2002	Bendigo, Australia	Australia	1–1	1–4	Friendly	
2	4 October 2002	Yangsan Stadium, Yangsan, South Korea	Chinese Taipei	2–0	2–1	2002 Asian Games	
3	20 July 2006	Hindmarsh Stadium, Adelaide, Australia	Thailand	2–0	11–0	2006 AFC Women's Asian Cup	
4	20 July 2006	Hindmarsh Stadium, Adelaide, Australia	Thailand	5–0	11–0	2006 AFC Women's Asian Cup	
5	20 July 2006	Hindmarsh Stadium, Adelaide, Australia	Thailand	7–0	11–0	2006 AFC Women's Asian Cup	
6	20 July 2006	Hindmarsh Stadium, Adelaide, Australia	Thailand	8–0	11–0	2006 AFC Women's Asian Cup	
7	20 July 2006	Hindmarsh Stadium, Adelaide, Australia	Thailand	9–0	11–0	2006 AFC Women's Asian Cup	
8	20 July 2006	Hindmarsh Stadium, Adelaide, Australia	Thailand	10–0	11–0	2006 AFC Women's Asian Cup	
9	22 July 2006	Hindmarsh Stadium, Adelaide, Australia	Myanmar	3–0	3–1	2006 AFC Women's Asian Cup	

== Honours ==
=== Daekyo Kangaroos ===
- National Sports Festival winner: 2006
- KWFF Spring Championship winner: 2008
- Unification Cup winner: 2007, 2008
- National Women's Football Championship winner: 2007

=== South Korea ===
- Women's East Asian Cup winner: 2005

=== Individual ===
- 2006 AFC Women's Asian Cup top scorer (7 goals)
