= Han Hye-yong =

North Korean footballer (born 1985)

Personal information
- Date of birth: 4 March 1985 (age 41)
- Place of birth: North Korea
- Position: Goalkeeper

Senior career*
| Years | Team | Apps | (Gls) |
| 2008 | Pyongyang City | | |

International career
| 2008 | North Korea | 6 (?) | (0) |
Korean name
| Hangul | 한혜영 |
| RR | Han Hyeyeong |
| MR | Han Hyeyŏng |
- * Club domestic league appearances and goals

Han Hye-yong (Korean pronunciation: [han.ɦe.jʌŋ] or [han] [he.jʌŋ]; born 4 March 1985) is a female North Korean football goalkeeper.

She was part of the North Korea women's national football team at the 2008 Summer Olympics. On club level she played for Pyongyang City.

== See also ==
- North Korea at the 2008 Summer Olympics
