= Tomoe nage =

Judo technique

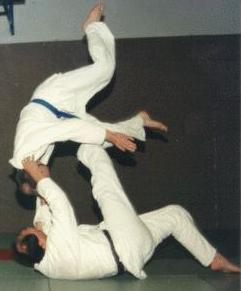
- A demonstration of tomoe nage. The person on the bottom is throwing the person above them as they roll backwards.
- Classification: Nage-waza
- Sub classification: Sutemi-waza
- Kodokan: Yes

Technique name
- Rōmaji: Tomoe-nage
- Japanese: 巴投
- English: Circle throw
- Korean: 배대 뒤치기

Tomoe nage (巴投) is one of the traditional forty throws of jujutsu and Judo. It belongs to the third group (Sankyo) of the traditional throwing list, the traditional Gokyo (no waza), and the current 67 Throws of Kodokan Judo. Tomoe nage is categorized as a front sacrifice technique or Mae-sutemi, because the technique is not a sweep or a trip and tori falls back in front of uke while throwing uke. It is also one of Danzan Ryu's twenty throws in the Nagete list.

== Technique ==
Tomoe nage is performed by the attacker (tori) gripping the opponent (uke) high and falling backward as in a backward roll. Once uke is off balance forward, tori plants a foot low on uke at waist level and applies strong pressure, rolling onto his own back with uke above him. This causes uke to flip over tori and land on his back. The final position is both practitioners are on their backs, head to head. Variations that maintain the high grip and complete the backward roll allow tori to mount uke at the completion of the throw. Counters to tomoe nage include crouching or evading the rising foot of the attacker.

== Similar techniques, variants, and aliases ==
Similar techniques:

- Sumi gaeshi
- Hikikomi gaeshi

Aliases:

- Wheel throw
- Circular throw
- Monkey flip

Variants:

- Yoko tomoe nage (横巴投): Side circle throw
- Maki tomoe nage (巻巴投): Roll circle throw, where the user transitions the move into tate shiho gatame
