= Sumi gaeshi =

Judo technique

- Vector illustration of Sumi-gaeshi technique.
- Classification: Nage-waza
- Sub classification: Sutemi-waza
- Kodokan: Yes

Technique name
- Rōmaji: Sumi gaeshi
- Japanese: 隅返
- English: Corner reversal
- Korean: 안오금 띄기

Sumi Gaeshi (隅返) is one of the original 40 throws of Judo as developed by Jigoro Kano. It belongs to the fourth group,

Dai Yonkyo, of the traditional throwing list, Gokyo-no-Nagewaza, of Kodokan Judo. It is also part of the current 67 Throws of Kodokan Judo. It is classified as a rear sacrifice technique, Sutemi-waza.

== Technique Description ==
The Sumi Gaeshi is done by grabbing your uke opposite you by their clothing, more specifically below the collar. The tori then plants their foot or knee in the opposite upper thigh, taking care not to hit the groin. The tori then rolls backwards using the forward momentum of the opponent to propel them forward. This can be followed up with any number of grapples, joint extensions, or choke holds.

== Included Systems ==
Systems:

- Kodokan Judo, Judo Lists

Lists:

- The Canon Of Judo
- Judo technique

== Similar Techniques, Variants, and Aliases ==
Similar techniques:

Tomoe nage

hikikomi gaeshi

English aliases:

- Corner throw
- Corner reversal
