= Benjamin Darbelet =

French judoka (born 1980)

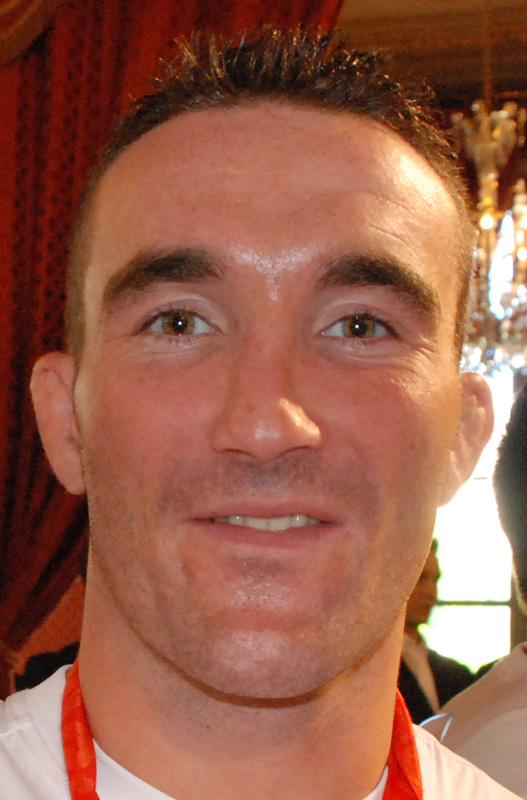

Personal information
- Full name: Benjamin René Pierre Darbelet
- Born: 13 November 1980 (age 45)
- Occupation: Judoka

Sport
- Country: France
- Sport: Judo
- Weight class: –66 kg, –73 kg
- Club: INSEP
- Coached by: Christian Chaumont

Achievements and titles
- Olympic Games: (silver) (2008)
- World Champ.: R16 (2011)
- European Champ.: (gold) (2003)
Medal record
Men's judo
Representing France
Olympic Games
Silver medal – second place	2008 Beijing	‍–‍66 kg
European Championships
Gold medal – first place	2003 Düsseldorf	‍–‍66 kg
Silver medal – second place	2006 Tampere	‍–‍66 kg
Bronze medal – third place	2004 Bucharest	‍–‍66 kg
Bronze medal – third place	2005 Rotterdam	‍–‍66 kg
Bronze medal – third place	2007 Belgrade	‍–‍66 kg
IJF Grand Slam
Gold medal – first place	2010 Moscow	‍–‍73 kg
Silver medal – second place	2009 Paris	‍–‍66 kg
IJF Grand Prix
Bronze medal – third place	2010 Qingdao	‍–‍73 kg
European Junior Championships
Gold medal – first place	1999 Rome	‍–‍66 kg

Profile at external databases
- IJF: 2307
- JudoInside.com: 6675
- Updated on 28 May 2023

Benjamin René Pierre Darbelet (born 13 November 1980 in Dijon) is a French judoka. He earned a silver medal in the 2008 Beijing Olympics in the ‍–‍66 kg category. Darbelet has recently been competing in the ‍–‍73 kg weight category. Some of Darbelet's favourite techniques include te guruma, ouchi gari, harai goshi, osoto gari and uchi mata.
