= Taylor Takata =

American judoka

Personal information
- Born: April 6, 1982 (age 44) Honolulu, Hawaii, United States

Sport
- Sport: Judo

Taylor Takata (born April 6, 1982) is an American judoka who placed 9th at Men's Judo (66 kg Weight Category) in the 2008 Summer Olympics. He represented the United States and comes from the state of Hawaii.

== Biography ==
Takata was born in Honolulu, Hawaii. Following his graduation from ʻIolani School, he attended San Jose State University and University of Colorado at Colorado Springs. He currently runs a dojo in Hawaii called Hawaii Judo Academy.

The club he belongs to is the USA Judo National Training Site at the Olympic Training Center. He is coached by Eddie Liddie.

He represented the United States at both the Junior and Senior World Championships in the 60 kg division as well as winning National Championship, Pan American and U.S. Open Titles. In 2004, he moved up to the 66 kg division.

Taylor Takata has held the #1 U.S. ranking in judo this year after several years of moving among the rankings. Takata won the Olympic Trials in June 2008, earning a spot on the US Olympic team and the chance to compete in the 2008 Beijing Olympics. He placed 9th in the 66 kg division.

What Takata has said about the Olympics:

"It's been great to be here and experience the Olympics and fight the best guys in the world."
