= Carlos Pinto (equestrian) =

Portuguese dressage rider

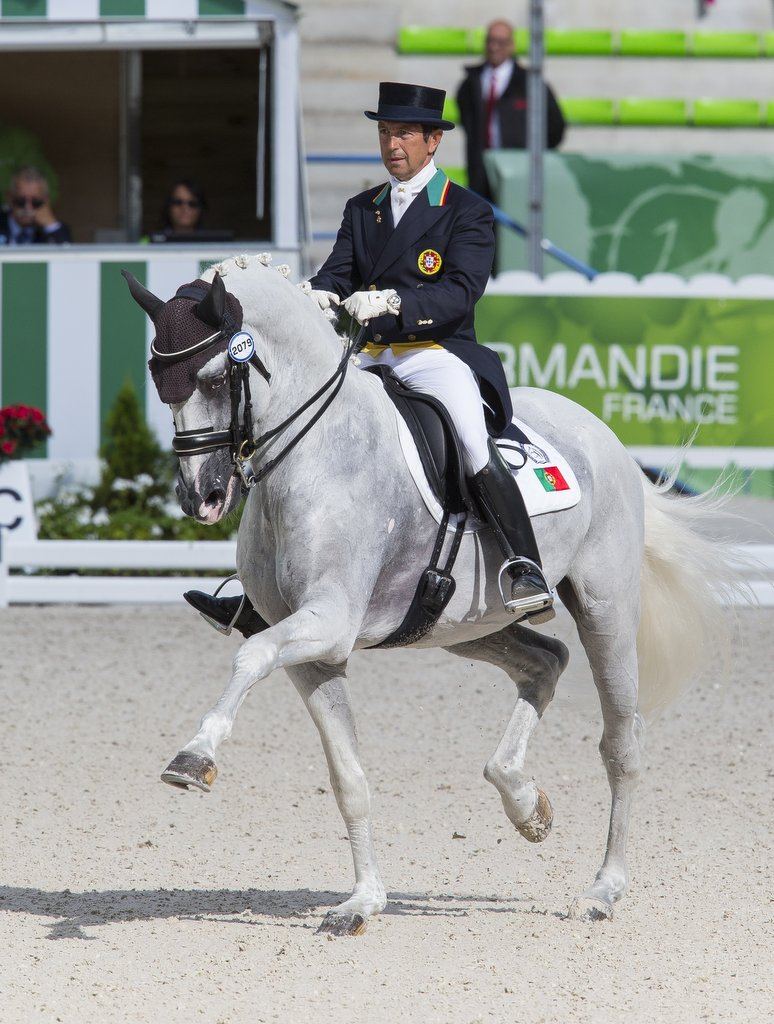
- Carlos Pinto riding Soberano III - 2014 World Equestrian Games

Personal information
- Born: 24 August 1959 (age 65)

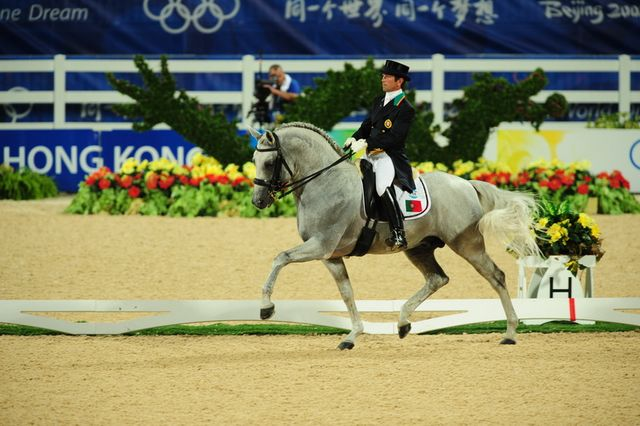
Carlos Pinto riding Notavel at the 2008 Olympics

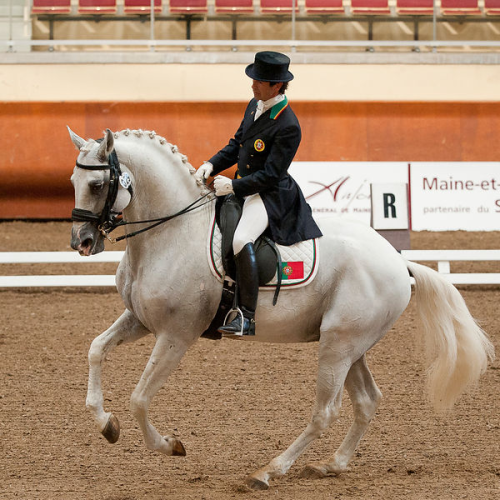
Carlos Pinto riding Soberano III in Saumur

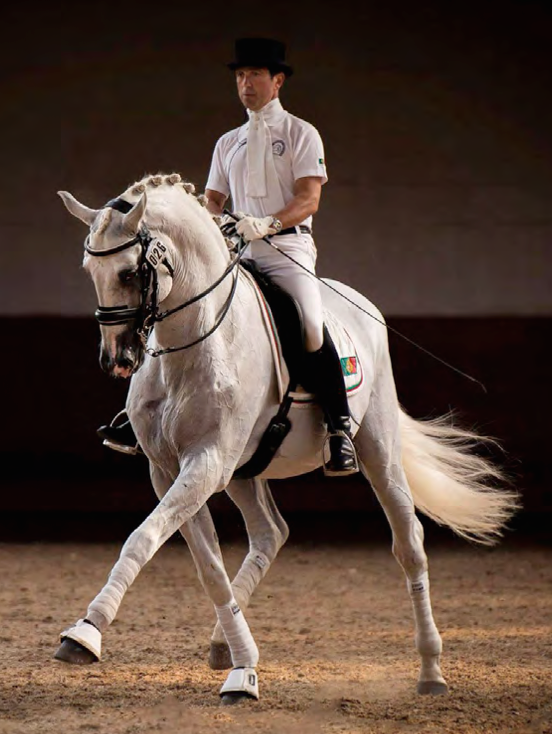
Carlos Pinto

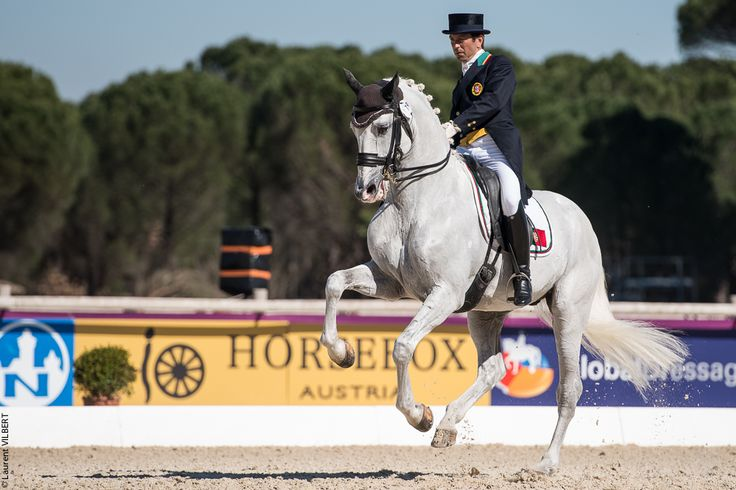
Carlos Pinto

Carlos Pinto (born 24 August 1959) is a Portuguese Olympic dressage rider.

Carlos' brother Daniel is also Portuguese Olympian in dressage.

== Championships ==
Carlos Pinto represents Portugal since 1989, he competed at the 2008 Summer Olympics in Hong Kong, where he placed 38th in the individual competition. He also competed at the 2014 World Equestrian Games, and at seven European Dressage Championships (in 1995, 1997, 2001, 2005, 2007, 2009 and 2021). His current best championship result is 9th place in team dressage from the 2009 European Dressage Championship held at Windsor Castle, while his current best individual result is 32nd place from the same event.
