= Julia Chevanne-Gimel =

French equestrian

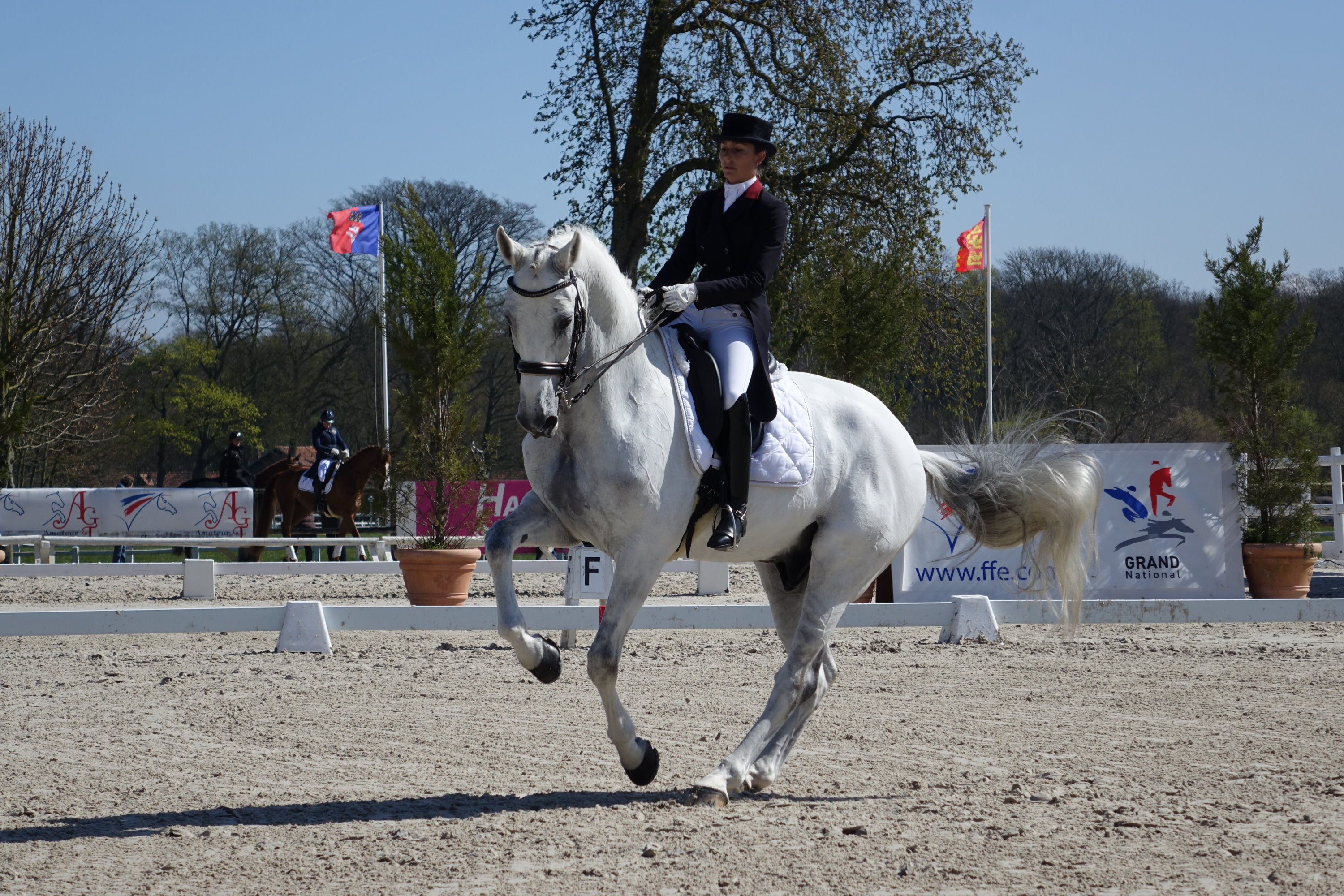
- Julia Chevanne in 2016

Personal information
- Nationality: French
- Born: 7 November 1975 (age 49); Paris, France

Sport
- Sport: Equestrian

Julia Chevanne-Gimel (born 7 November 1975) is a French equestrian. She competed at the 2004 Summer Olympics and the 2008 Summer Olympics.

She became the French national champion in 2003 and 2007.
