= Pedro Dias (judoka) =

Portuguese judoka

Personal information
- Born: 7 May 1982 (age 44)
- Occupation: Judoka

Sport
- Country: Portugal
- Sport: Judo
- Weight class: –66 kg

Achievements and titles
- Olympic Games: 9th (2008)
- World Champ.: 13th (2007)
- European Champ.: (bronze) (2008)
Medal record
Men's judo
Representing Portugal
European Championships
Bronze medal – third place	2008 Lisbon	–66 kg
European U23 Championships
Bronze medal – third place	2004 Ljubljana	–66 kg

Profile at external databases
- IJF: 39584
- JudoInside.com: 13857
- Updated on 16 November 2022

Pedro Dias (born 7 May 1982) is a Portuguese judoka.

== Achievements ==
Year	Tournament	Place	Weight class
2008	European Championships	3rd	Half lightweight (66 kg)
2006	European Judo Championships	5th	Half lightweight (66 kg)
