= Miguel Duarte =

Portuguese equestrian

Personal information
- Nationality: Portuguese
- Born: 1 December 1966 (age 58); Lisbon, Portugal

Sport
- Sport: Equestrian

Miguel Duarte (born 1 December 1966) is a Portuguese equestrian. He competed in two events at the 2008 Summer Olympics.
