= Daniel Pinto (equestrian) =

Portuguese equestrian

Personal information
- Born: 13 May 1967 (age 59)

Daniel Pinto (born 13 May 1967) is a Portuguese Olympic dressage rider. Representing Portugal, he competed at two Summer Olympics (in 2000 and 2008), where he achieved 27th and 33rd positions, respectively, in individual dressage

Daniel also competed at three editions of World Equestrian Games (in 1998, 2002, 2006 and 2010) and at six European Dressage Championships (in 1995, 2001, 2007, 2009, 2015 and 2017). His current best championship result is 6th place in team dressage from the 2017 Europeans held in Gothenburg, Sweden, while his current best individual result is 23rd place from the same event.

Pinto qualified for the 2007 edition of Dressage World Cup final where he finished 12th.

His brother Carlos Pinto is also a Portuguese Olympian in dressage.
