= Pak Chol-min (judoka) =

North Korean judoka (born 1982)

Personal information
- Born: 21 September 1982 (age 43)
- Occupation: Judoka

Korean name
- Hangul: 박철민
- Hanja: 朴哲民
- RR: Bak Cheolmin
- MR: Pak Ch'ŏlmin

Sport
- Country: North Korea
- Sport: Judo
- Weight class: –66 kg, –73 kg

Achievements and titles
- Olympic Games: (bronze) (2008)
- World Champ.: 9th (2007)
- Asian Champ.: 5th (2008, 2009)
Medal record
Men's judo
Representing North Korea
Olympic Games
Bronze medal – third place	2008 Beijing	‍–‍66 kg
IJF Grand Prix
Bronze medal – third place	2009 Qingdao	‍–‍73 kg

Profile at external databases
- IJF: 5804
- JudoInside.com: 43505
- Updated on 28 May 2023

Pak Chol-min (Korean pronunciation: [pak̚.tsʰʌl.min]; born 21 September 1982) is a North Korean judoka. He won the bronze medal in the Men's 66 kg at the 2008 Summer Olympics.
