= Giovanni Casale =

Italian judoka

Giovanni Casale (born 20 January 1980 in Messina, Italy) is an Italian judoka. He competed in the 60–66 kg category at the 2008 Summer Olympics.

== Achievements ==
Year	Tournament	Place	Weight Class
2007	World Judo Championships	5th	Half lightweight (66 kg)
2005	Mediterranean Games	2nd	Half lightweight (66 kg)
