= 2007 FIFA Women's World Cup Group C =

Football tournament group stage

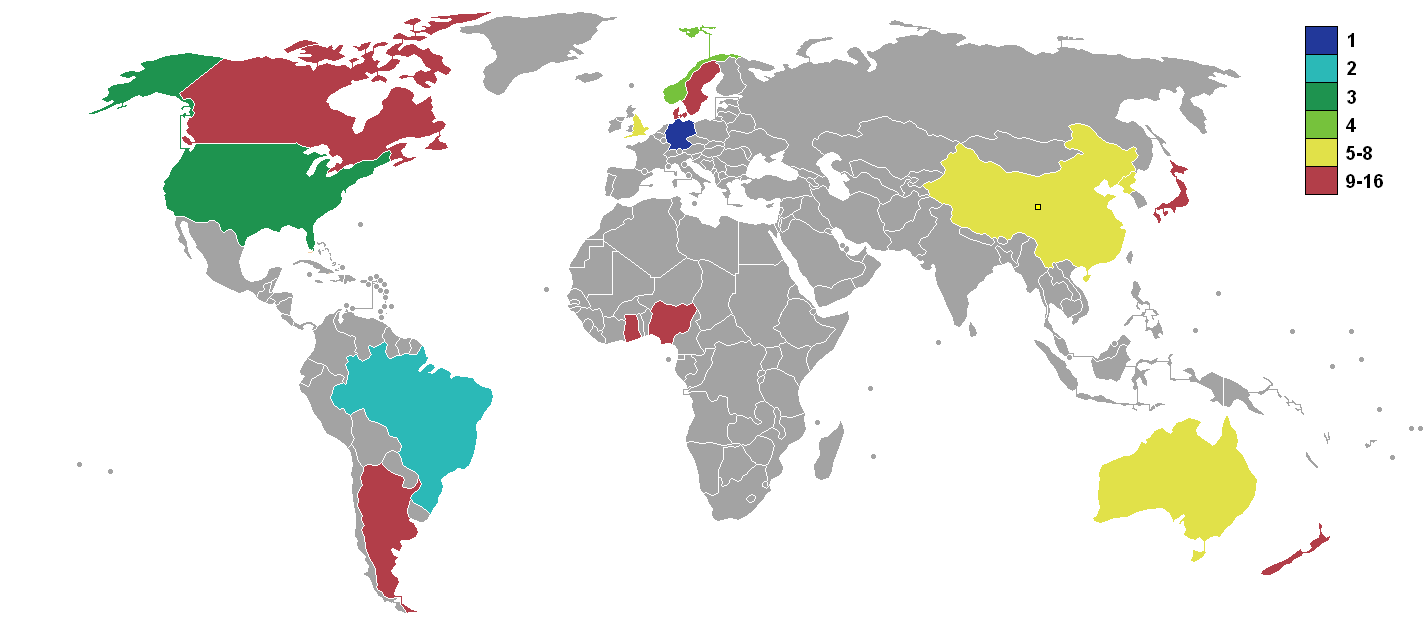
Final rankings of the teams on FIFA Womens World Cup 2007

Group C was one of four groups of nations competing at the 2007 FIFA Women's World Cup. The group's first round of matches began on 12 September and its last matches were played on 20 September 2007. Most matches were played at the Yellow Dragon Stadium in Hangzhou. Norway topped the group, joined in the second round by Australia, the only team Norway failed to beat. Canada surprisingly failed to make the second round. This was the third successive World Cup where Australia and Ghana were drawn in the same group.

== Standings ==
Pos	Team	Pld	W	D	L	GF	GA	GD	Pts	Qualification
1	Norway	3	2	1	0	10	4	+6	7	Advance to knockout stage
2	Australia	3	1	2	0	7	4	+3	5	Advance to knockout stage
3	Canada	3	1	1	1	7	4	+3	4	
4	Ghana	3	0	0	3	3	15	−12	0	

Source: FIFA
Rules for classification: Group stage tiebreakers

== Matches ==
All times are local (UTC+8)

=== Ghana vs Australia ===
12 September 2007
17:00

Ghana	1–4	Australia
Amankwa 70'	Report	Walsh 15'; De Vanna 57', 81'; Garriock 69'

Yellow Dragon Stadium, Hangzhou
Attendance: 30,752
Referee: Adriana Correa (Colombia)

Ghana:
GK	16	Memunatu Sulemana
DF	2	Aminatu Ibrahim
DF	3	Mavis Danso
DF	12	Olivia Amoako
DF	13	Yaa Avoe	(substituted off) 67'
DF	15	Lydia Ankrah
MF	6	Florence Okoe
MF	21	Memuna Darku
MF	10	Adjoa Bayor (c)
FW	9	Anita Amenuku	(substituted off) 67'
FW	18	Anita Amankwa
Substitutions:
DF	17	Hamdya Abass	(substituted on) 67'
MF	20	Belinda Kanda	(substituted on) 67'
Manager:
(Ghana) Isaac Paha

Australia:
GK	1	Melissa Barbieri
DF	2	Kate McShea	(yellow card) 87'
DF	4	Dianne Alagich
DF	5	Cheryl Salisbury (c)	(yellow card) 90'
DF	7	Heather Garriock
DF	19	Clare Polkinghorne		(substituted off) 83'
MF	15	Sally Shipard
MF	14	Collette McCallum
MF	10	Joanne Peters		(substituted off) 62'
FW	8	Caitlin Munoz		(substituted off) 46'
FW	9	Sarah Walsh	(yellow card) 53'
Substitutions:
FW	11	Lisa De Vanna		(substituted on) 46'
MF	3	Alicia Ferguson		(substituted on) 62'
DF	13	Thea Slatyer		(substituted on) 83'
Manager:
(Scotland) Tom Sermanni

=== Norway vs Canada ===
12 September 2007
20:00

Norway	2–1	Canada
R. Gulbrandsen 52'; Stangeland Horpestad 81'	Report	Chapman 33'

Yellow Dragon Stadium, Hangzhou
Attendance: 30,752
Referee: Christine Beck (Germany)

Norway:
GK	1	Bente Nordby
DF	2	Ane Stangeland Horpestad (c)
DF	3	Gunhild Følstad
DF	5	Siri Nordby	(substituted off) 46'
DF	7	Trine Rønning
DF	21	Lene Storløkken	(substituted off) 76'
MF	4	Ingvild Stensland
MF	8	Solveig Gulbrandsen
FW	10	Melissa Wiik	(substituted off) 66'
FW	11	Leni Larsen Kaurin
FW	16	Ragnhild Gulbrandsen
Substitutions:
MF	6	Camilla Huse	(substituted on) 46'
FW	17	Lene Mykjåland	(substituted on) 66'
MF	18	Marie Knutsen	(substituted on) 76'
Manager:
(Norway) Bjarne Berntsen

Canada:
GK	18	Erin McLeod
DF	2	Kristina Kiss
DF	6	Tanya Dennis
DF	10	Martina Franko
DF	11	Randee Hermuss
MF	9	Candace Chapman	(substituted off) 73'
MF	8	Diana Matheson
MF	19	Sophie Schmidt
MF	14	Melissa Tancredi	(substituted off) 46'
FW	15	Kara Lang	(substituted off) 83'
FW	12	Christine Sinclair (c)
Substitutions:
FW	7	Rhian Wilkinson	(substituted on) 46'
MF	13	Amy Walsh	(substituted on) 73'
FW	21	Jodi-Ann Robinson	(substituted on) 83'
Manager:
(Norway) Even Pellerud

=== Canada vs Ghana ===
15 September 2007
17:00

Canada	4–0	Ghana
Sinclair 16', 62'; Schmidt 55'; Franko 77'	Report

Yellow Dragon Stadium, Hangzhou
Attendance: 33,835
Referee: Nicole Petignat (Switzerland)

Canada:
GK	18	Erin McLeod
DF	2	Kristina Kiss
DF	6	Tanya Dennis	(yellow card) 8'
DF	10	Martina Franko
DF	11	Randee Hermuss
MF	9	Candace Chapman
MF	8	Diana Matheson		(substituted off) 84'
MF	16	Katie Thorlakson		(substituted off) 45'
MF	19	Sophie Schmidt
FW	15	Kara Lang		(substituted off) 63'
FW	12	Christine Sinclair (c)
Substitutions:
FW	21	Jodi-Ann Robinson		(substituted on) 45'
FW	7	Rhian Wilkinson		(substituted on) 63'
MF	5	Andrea Neil		(substituted on) 84'
Manager:
(Norway) Even Pellerud

Ghana:
GK	16	Memunatu Sulemana
DF	2	Aminatu Ibrahim
DF	3	Mavis Danso
DF	12	Olivia Amoako	(yellow card) 78'
DF	13	Yaa Avoe		(substituted off) 35'
MF	6	Florence Okoe
MF	21	Memuna Darku		(substituted off) 77'
MF	10	Adjoa Bayor (c)		(substituted off) 71'
FW	11	Gloria Foriwa	(yellow card) 39'
FW	14	Rumanatu Tahiru
FW	18	Anita Amankwa	(yellow card) 21'
Substitutions:
DF	17	Hamdya Abass		(substituted on) 35'
FW	7	Safia Abdul		(substituted on) 71'
DF	15	Lydia Ankrah		(substituted on) 77'
Manager:
(Ghana) Isaac Paha

=== Australia vs Norway ===
15 September 2007
20:00

Australia	1–1	Norway
De Vanna 83'	Report	R. Gulbrandsen 5'

Yellow Dragon Stadium, Hangzhou
Attendance: 33,835
Referee: Niu Huijun (China)

Australia:
GK	1	Melissa Barbieri
DF	13	Thea Slatyer
DF	4	Dianne Alagich
DF	5	Cheryl Salisbury (c)
DF	7	Heather Garriock
MF	16	Lauren Colthorpe	(substituted off) 76'
MF	17	Danielle Small	(substituted off) 46'
MF	14	Collette McCallum
MF	3	Alicia Ferguson
FW	20	Joanne Burgess
FW	12	Kate Gill	(substituted off) 61'
Substitutions:
FW	11	Lisa De Vanna	(substituted on) 46'
FW	9	Sarah Walsh	(substituted on) 61'
FW	8	Caitlin Munoz	(substituted on) 76'
Manager:
(Scotland) Tom Sermanni

Norway:
GK	1	Bente Nordby
DF	2	Ane Stangeland Horpestad (c)
DF	3	Gunhild Følstad
DF	6	Camilla Huse
DF	7	Trine Rønning
MF	18	Marie Knutsen
MF	4	Ingvild Stensland
MF	8	Solveig Gulbrandsen	(substituted off) 86'
FW	10	Melissa Wiik	(substituted off) 46'
FW	11	Leni Larsen Kaurin	(substituted off) 74'
FW	16	Ragnhild Gulbrandsen
Substitutions:
FW	17	Lene Mykjåland	(substituted on) 46'
FW	14	Guro Knutsen	(substituted on) 74'
MF	21	Lene Storløkken	(substituted on) 86'
Manager:
(Norway) Bjarne Berntsen

=== Norway vs Ghana ===
20 September 2007 (Note: The Norway v Ghana match, originally scheduled on 19 September at Hongkou Football Stadium, Shanghai, was postponed by FIFA to the following day and moved to Yellow Dragon Stadium, Hangzhou, due to Typhoon Wipha. FIFA also delayed the Australia v Canada match, originally scheduled on 19 September to the following day. This was to allow for simultaneous kick-off times on the final matchday of the group, after it was confirmed that weather conditions would not affect the rescheduling.)
17:00

Norway	7–2	Ghana
Storløkken 4'; R. Gulbrandsen 39', 59', 62'; Stangeland Horpestad 45' (pen.); Herlovsen 56'; Klaveness 69'	Report	Bayor 73'; Okoe 80' (pen.)

Yellow Dragon Stadium, Hangzhou
Attendance: 43,817
Referee: Jennifer Bennett (United States)

Norway:
GK	1	Bente Nordby
DF	2	Ane Stangeland Horpestad (c)
DF	6	Camilla Huse
DF	5	Siri Nordby
DF	19	Marit Fiane Christensen
DF	21	Lene Storløkken
MF	4	Ingvild Stensland
MF	8	Solveig Gulbrandsen	(substituted off) 46'
FW	17	Lene Mykjåland	(substituted off) 46'
FW	11	Leni Larsen Kaurin	(substituted off) 61'
FW	16	Ragnhild Gulbrandsen
Substitutions:
FW	9	Isabell Herlovsen	(substituted on) 46'
MF	15	Madeleine Giske	(substituted on) 46'
FW	20	Lise Klaveness	(substituted on) 61'
Manager:
(Norway) Bjarne Berntsen

Ghana:
GK	1	Gladys Enti		(substituted off) 64'
DF	2	Aminatu Ibrahim	(yellow card) 15'
DF	3	Mavis Danso
DF	12	Olivia Amoako
DF	13	Yaa Avoe
MF	6	Florence Okoe
MF	4	Doreen Awuah		(substituted off) 58'
MF	10	Adjoa Bayor (c)
FW	9	Anita Amenuku		(substituted off) 46'
FW	14	Rumanatu Tahiru
FW	18	Anita Amankwa
Substitutions:
MF	8	Sheila Okai	(yellow card) 74'	(substituted on) 46'
MF	21	Memuna Darku		(substituted on) 58'
GK	16	Memunatu Sulemana		(substituted on) 64'
Manager:
(Ghana) Isaac Paha

=== Australia vs Canada ===
20 September 2007
17:00

Australia	2–2	Canada
McCallum 53'; Salisbury 90+2'	Report	Tancredi 1'; Sinclair 85'

Chengdu Sports Centre Stadium, Chengdu
Attendance: 29,300
Referee: Gyöngyi Gaál (Hungary)

Australia:
GK	1	Melissa Barbieri
DF	2	Kate McShea
DF	4	Dianne Alagich
DF	5	Cheryl Salisbury (c)
DF	7	Heather Garriock
MF	16	Lauren Colthorpe		(substituted off) 83'
MF	15	Sally Shipard
MF	14	Collette McCallum	(yellow card) 90'
MF	10	Joanne Peters		(substituted off) 76'
FW	8	Caitlin Munoz		(substituted off) 62'
FW	9	Sarah Walsh
Substitutions:
FW	11	Lisa De Vanna		(substituted on) 46'
FW	20	Joanne Burgess		(substituted on) 62'
MF	3	Alicia Ferguson		(substituted on) 76'
Manager:
(Scotland) Tom Sermanni

Canada:
GK	18	Erin McLeod		(substituted off) 79'
DF	6	Tanya Dennis
DF	10	Martina Franko
DF	11	Randee Hermuss	(yellow card) 89'
MF	9	Candace Chapman
MF	8	Diana Matheson
MF	7	Rhian Wilkinson
MF	19	Sophie Schmidt
MF	14	Melissa Tancredi		(substituted off) 68'
FW	15	Kara Lang		(substituted off) 90+2'
FW	12	Christine Sinclair (c)
Substitutions:
FW	21	Jodi-Ann Robinson		(substituted on) 68'
GK	20	Taryn Swiatek		(substituted on) 79'
DF	17	Brittany Timko		(substituted on) 90+2'
Manager:
(Norway) Even Pellerud

== See also ==
- Australia at the FIFA Women's World Cup
- Canada at the FIFA Women's World Cup
- Ghana at the FIFA Women's World Cup
- Norway at the FIFA Women's World Cup
