= 2007 FIFA Women's World Cup knockout stage =

Football tournament knockout stage

The knockout stage of the 2007 FIFA Women's World Cup took place between 22 and 30 September 2007, and was composed of Brazil, hosts China, Norway, Australia, North Korea, the United States, England, and defending champions Germany.

The knockout stage comprised the eight teams that advanced from the group stage of the tournament. There were three rounds of matches, with each round eliminating half of the teams entering that round. The successive rounds were the quarter-finals, semi-finals, and the final. There was also a play-off to decide third and fourth place. For each match in the knockout stage, any draw at 90 minutes was followed by thirty minutes of extra time; if scores were still level, there was a penalty shoot-out to determine who progressed to the next round. FIFA had abolished the golden goal rule in 2005.

All four group winners (Brazil, Germany, Norway and the United States) reached the semi-finals. Both semi-finals were lopsided victories, as Germany beat Norway 3–0 and Brazil shocked the United States 4–0.

== Qualified teams ==
Group	Winners	Runners-up
A	Germany	England
B	United States	North Korea
C	Norway	Australia
D	Brazil	China

== Bracket ==
Quarter-finals
22 September – Wuhan
Germany	3
North Korea	0
23 September – Wuhan
Norway	1
China	0
22 September – Tianjin
United States	3
England	0
23 September – Tianjin
Brazil	3
Australia	2

Semi-finals
26 September – Tianjin
Germany	3
Norway	0
27 September – Hangzhou
United States	0
Brazil	4

Final
30 September – Shanghai
Germany	2
Brazil	0
Third place play-off
30 September – Shanghai
Norway	1
United States	4

== Quarter-finals ==
=== Germany vs North Korea ===
22 September 2007
17:00

Germany	3–0	North Korea
Garefrekes 44'; Lingor 67'; Krahn 72'	Report

Wuhan Sports Centre Stadium, Wuhan
Attendance: 37,200
Referee: Tammy Ogston (Australia)

Germany	North Korea

GK	1	Nadine Angerer
DF	2	Kerstin Stegemann
DF	5	Annike Krahn
DF	17	Ariane Hingst
MF	6	Linda Bresonik	(substituted off) 77'
MF	7	Melanie Behringer
MF	10	Renate Lingor
MF	18	Kerstin Garefrekes
MF	14	Simone Laudehr
FW	8	Sandra Smisek	(substituted off) 74'
FW	9	Birgit Prinz (c)
Substitutions:
FW	16	Martina Müller	(substituted on) 74'
DF	13	Sandra Minnert	(substituted on) 77'
Manager:
(Germany) Silvia Neid

GK	21	Jon Myong Hui
DF	3	Om Jong Ran
DF	5	Song Jong Sun	(yellow card) 51'
DF	15	Sonu Kyong Sun
DF	16	Kong Hye Ok
DF	20	Hong Myong Gum		(substituted off) 74'
MF	9	Ri Un Suk
MF	12	Ri Un Gyong
FW	17	Kim Yong Ae		(substituted off) 50'
FW	8	Kil Son Hui
FW	10	Ri Kum Suk (c)
Substitutions:
MF	2	Kim Kyong Hwa		(substituted on) 50'
FW	19	Jong Pok Sim		(substituted on) 74'
Manager:
(North Korea) Kim Kwang-min

=== United States vs England ===
22 September 2007
20:00

United States	3–0	England
Wambach 48'; Boxx 57'; Lilly 60'	Report

Tianjin Olympic Center Stadium, Tianjin
Attendance: 29,586
Referee: Jenny Palmqvist (Sweden)

United States	England

GK	18	Hope Solo
DF	3	Christie Rampone
DF	4	Cat Whitehill
DF	14	Stephanie Lopez
DF	15	Kate Markgraf
MF	13	Kristine Lilly (c)
MF	12	Leslie Osborne
MF	7	Shannon Boxx	(substituted off) 82'
MF	17	Lori Chalupny
FW	9	Heather O'Reilly
FW	20	Abby Wambach	(substituted off) 86'
Substitutions:
MF	11	Carli Lloyd	(substituted on) 82'
FW	6	Natasha Kai	(substituted on) 86'
Manager:
(United States) Greg Ryan

GK	1	Rachel Brown
DF	2	Alex Scott
DF	3	Casey Stoney
DF	5	Faye White (c)
DF	6	Mary Phillip	(substituted off) 80'
DF	12	Anita Asante
MF	4	Katie Chapman
MF	7	Karen Carney
MF	16	Jill Scott
FW	9	Eniola Aluko	(substituted off) 46'
FW	10	Kelly Smith
Substitutions:
MF	11	Rachel Yankey	(substituted on) 46'
FW	18	Lianne Sanderson	(substituted on) 80'
Manager:
(England) Hope Powell

=== Norway vs China ===
23 September 2007
17:00

Norway	1–0	China
Herlovsen 32'	Report

Wuhan Sports Centre Stadium, Wuhan
Attendance: 52,000
Referee: Gyöngyi Gaál (Hungary)

Norway	China

GK	1	Bente Nordby
DF	2	Ane Stangeland Horpestad (c)
DF	6	Camilla Huse
DF	3	Gunhild Følstad	(yellow card) 59'
DF	7	Trine Rønning	(yellow card) 85'
MF	18	Marie Knutsen
MF	4	Ingvild Stensland
MF	8	Solveig Gulbrandsen		(substituted off) 75'
FW	9	Isabell Herlovsen		(substituted off) 90+3'
FW	11	Leni Larsen Kaurin		(substituted off) 64'
FW	16	Ragnhild Gulbrandsen	(yellow card) 83'
Substitutions:
FW	20	Lise Klaveness		(substituted on) 64'
DF	21	Lene Storløkken		(substituted on) 75'
DF	19	Marit Fiane Christensen		(substituted on) 90+3'
Manager:
(Norway) Bjarne Berntsen

GK	1	Zhang Yanru
CB	16	Liu Yali
CB	3	Li Jie
CB	11	Pu Wei
RM	4	Wang Kun	(yellow card) 69'
CM	6	Xie Caixia		(substituted off) 71'
CM	20	Zhang Tong		(substituted off) 75'
LM	7	Bi Yan (c)
RF	8	Pan Lina
CF	9	Han Duan
LF	10	Ma Xiaoxu
Substitutions:
FW	14	Zhang Ouying		(substituted on) 71'
FW	17	Liu Sa		(substituted on) 75'
Manager:
(Sweden) Marika Domanski-Lyfors

=== Brazil vs Australia ===
23 September 2007
20:00

Brazil	3–2	Australia
Formiga 4'; Marta 23' (pen.); Cristiane 75'	Report	De Vanna 36'; Colthorpe 68'

Tianjin Olympic Center Stadium, Tianjin
Attendance: 35,061
Referee: Christine Beck (Germany)

Brazil	Australia

GK	1	Andréia
CB	3	Aline (c)
CB	5	Renata Costa
CB	4	Tânia
RM	2	Elaine
CM	8	Formiga	(substituted off) 90+2'
CM	20	Ester
LM	9	Maycon
AM	7	Daniela
CF	11	Cristiane
CF	10	Marta
Substitutions:
DF	16	Simone	(substituted on) 90+2'
Manager:
(Brazil) Jorge Barcellos

GK	1	Melissa Barbieri
DF	13	Thea Slatyer
DF	4	Dianne Alagich
DF	5	Cheryl Salisbury (c)		(substituted off) 20'
DF	7	Heather Garriock
MF	16	Lauren Colthorpe
MF	15	Sally Shipard		(substituted off) 78'
MF	14	Collette McCallum
MF	10	Joanne Peters	(yellow card) 63'	(substituted off) 81'
FW	11	Lisa De Vanna
FW	9	Sarah Walsh
Substitutions:
DF	2	Kate McShea		(substituted on) 20'
FW	8	Caitlin Munoz	(yellow card) 85'	(substituted on) 78'
FW	20	Joanne Burgess		(substituted on) 81'
Manager:
(Scotland) Tom Sermanni

== Semi-finals ==
=== Germany vs Norway ===
26 September 2007
20:00

Germany	3–0	Norway
Rønning 42' (o.g.); Stegemann 72'; Müller 75'	Report

Tianjin Olympic Center Stadium, Tianjin
Attendance: 53,819
Referee: Dagmar Damková (Czech Republic)

Germany	Norway

GK	1	Nadine Angerer
DF	2	Kerstin Stegemann
DF	5	Annike Krahn
DF	17	Ariane Hingst
MF	6	Linda Bresonik	(substituted off) 81'
MF	7	Melanie Behringer	(substituted off) 40'
MF	10	Renate Lingor
MF	18	Kerstin Garefrekes
MF	14	Simone Laudehr
FW	8	Sandra Smisek	(substituted off) 65'
FW	9	Birgit Prinz (c)
Substitutions:
MF	19	Fatmire Bajramaj	(substituted on) 40'
FW	16	Martina Müller	(substituted on) 65'
DF	13	Sandra Minnert	(substituted on) 81'
Manager:
(Germany) Silvia Neid

GK	1	Bente Nordby
DF	2	Ane Stangeland Horpestad (c)
DF	6	Camilla Huse
DF	3	Gunhild Følstad		(substituted off) 48'
DF	7	Trine Rønning
MF	18	Marie Knutsen
MF	4	Ingvild Stensland
MF	8	Solveig Gulbrandsen		(substituted off) 56'
FW	9	Isabell Herlovsen		(substituted off) 46'
FW	11	Leni Larsen Kaurin	(yellow card) 14'
FW	16	Ragnhild Gulbrandsen
Substitutions:
FW	20	Lise Klaveness		(substituted on) 46'
DF	5	Siri Nordby		(substituted on) 48'
DF	21	Lene Storløkken		(substituted on) 56'
Manager:
(Norway) Bjarne Berntsen

=== United States vs Brazil ===
27 September 2007
20:00

United States	0–4	Brazil
	Report	Osborne 20' (o.g.); Marta 27', 79'; Cristiane 56'

Yellow Dragon Stadium, Hangzhou
Attendance: 47,818
Referee: Nicole Petignat (Switzerland)

United States	Brazil

GK	1	Briana Scurry
DF	3	Christie Rampone
DF	4	Cat Whitehill
DF	14	Stephanie Lopez		(substituted off) 46'
DF	15	Kate Markgraf		(substituted off) 74'
MF	13	Kristine Lilly (c)
MF	12	Leslie Osborne
MF	7	Shannon Boxx	(yellow card) 14' (yellow-red card) 45+1'
MF	17	Lori Chalupny	(yellow card) 26'
FW	9	Heather O'Reilly		(substituted off) 60'
FW	20	Abby Wambach	(yellow card) 49'
Substitutions:
MF	11	Carli Lloyd		(substituted on) 46'
DF	8	Tina Ellertson		(substituted on) 60'
DF	2	Marian Dougherty		(substituted on) 74'
Manager:
(United States) Greg Ryan

GK	1	Andréia
CB	3	Aline (c)	(yellow card) 28'
CB	5	Renata Costa	(yellow card) 45'
CB	4	Tânia
RM	2	Elaine
CM	8	Formiga
CM	20	Ester
LM	9	Maycon
AM	7	Daniela
CF	11	Cristiane
CF	10	Marta
Manager:
(Brazil) Jorge Barcellos

== Third place play-off ==
30 September 2007
17:00

Norway	1–4	United States
R. Gulbrandsen 63'	Report	Wambach 30', 46'; Chalupny 58'; O'Reilly 59'

Hongkou Football Stadium, Shanghai
Attendance: 31,000
Referee: Gyöngyi Gaál (Hungary)

Norway	United States

GK	1	Bente Nordby
DF	2	Ane Stangeland Horpestad (c)
DF	19	Marit Fiane Christensen
DF	6	Camilla Huse
DF	3	Gunhild Følstad	(substituted off) 57'
DF	21	Lene Storløkken	(substituted off) 61'
MF	18	Marie Knutsen
MF	4	Ingvild Stensland
MF	8	Solveig Gulbrandsen
FW	10	Melissa Wiik	(substituted off) 78'
FW	16	Ragnhild Gulbrandsen
Substitutions:
MF	15	Madeleine Giske	(substituted on) 57'
FW	14	Guro Knutsen	(substituted on) 61'
MF	9	Isabell Herlovsen	(substituted on) 78'
Manager:
(Norway) Bjarne Berntsen

GK	1	Briana Scurry
DF	3	Christie Rampone		(substituted off) 46'
DF	4	Cat Whitehill
DF	14	Stephanie Lopez
DF	2	Marian Dalmy
MF	13	Kristine Lilly (c)		(substituted off) 89'
MF	12	Leslie Osborne
MF	10	Aly Wagner		(substituted off) 59'
MF	17	Lori Chalupny	(yellow card) 28'
FW	9	Heather O'Reilly
FW	20	Abby Wambach
Substitutions:
DF	8	Tina Ellertson		(substituted on) 46'
FW	5	Lindsay Tarpley		(substituted on) 59'
FW	6	Natasha Kai		(substituted on) 89'
Manager:
(United States) Greg Ryan

== Final ==
30 September 2007
20:00

Germany	2–0	Brazil
Prinz 52'; Laudehr 86'	Report

Hongkou Football Stadium, Shanghai
Attendance: 31,000
Referee: Tammy Ogston (Australia)

Germany	Brazil

GK	1	Nadine Angerer
RB	2	Kerstin Stegemann
CB	5	Annike Krahn
CB	17	Ariane Hingst
LB	6	Linda Bresonik	(yellow card) 63'
CM	14	Simone Laudehr
CM	10	Renate Lingor
RW	18	Kerstin Garefrekes	(yellow card) 7'
AM	9	Birgit Prinz (c)
LW	7	Melanie Behringer		(substituted off) 74'
CF	8	Sandra Smisek		(substituted off) 80'
Substitutions:
FW	16	Martina Müller		(substituted on) 74'
MF	19	Fatmire Bajramaj		(substituted on) 80'
Manager:
Silvia Neid

GK	1	Andréia
CB	3	Aline (c)		(substituted off) 88'
CB	5	Renata Costa
CB	4	Tânia		(substituted off) 81'
RM	2	Elaine
CM	8	Formiga
CM	20	Ester		(substituted off) 63'
LM	9	Maycon
AM	7	Daniela	(yellow card) 59'
CF	11	Cristiane
CF	10	Marta
Substitutions:
DF	6	Rosana		(substituted on) 63'
MF	18	Pretinha		(substituted on) 81'
FW	15	Kátia		(substituted on) 88'
Manager:
Jorge Barcellos
