= Ghana at the FIFA Women's World Cup =

Football event representation by Ghana

The Ghana women's national football team has represented Ghana at the FIFA Women's World Cup on three occasions: in 1999, 2003, and 2007.

== FIFA Women's World Cup record ==
Year	Result	Matches	Wins	Draws	Losses	GF	GA
(China) 1991	Did not qualify						
(Sweden) 1995	Did not qualify						
(United States) 1999	Group stage	3	0	1	2	1	10
(United States) 2003	Group stage	3	1	0	2	2	5
(China) 2007	Group stage	3	0	0	3	3	15
(Germany) 2011	Did not qualify						
(Canada) 2015	Did not qualify						
(France) 2019	Did not qualify						
(Australia) (New Zealand) 2023	Did not qualify						
(Brazil) 2027	To be determined						
(Costa Rica) (Jamaica) (Mexico) (United States) 2031	To be determined						
(United Kingdom) 2035	To be determined						
Total	3/10	9	1	1	7	6	30

FIFA Women's World Cup history
Year	Round	Date	Opponent	Result	Stadium
(United States) 1999	Group stage	20 June	Australia	D 1–1	Foxboro Stadium, Foxborough
(United States) 1999	Group stage	23 June	China	L 0–7	Civic Stadium, Portland
(United States) 1999	Group stage	26 June	Sweden	L 0–2	Soldier Field, Chicago
(United States) 2003	Group stage	21 September	China	L 0–1	The Home Depot Center, Carson
(United States) 2003	Group stage	25 September	Russia	L 0–3	The Home Depot Center, Carson
(United States) 2003	Group stage	28 September	Australia	W 2–1	PGE Park, Portland
(China) 2007	Group stage	12 September	Australia	L 1–4	Yellow Dragon Sports Center, Hangzhou
(China) 2007	Group stage	15 September	Canada	L 0–4	Yellow Dragon Sports Center, Hangzhou
(China) 2007	Group stage	20 September	Norway	L 2–7	Yellow Dragon Sports Center, Hangzhou

== Head-to-head record ==
Opponent	Pld	W	D	L	GF	GA	GD	Win %
Australia	3	1	1	1	4	6	−2	33.33
Canada	1	0	0	1	0	4	−4	0.00
China	2	0	0	2	0	8	−8	0.00
Russia	1	0	0	1	0	3	−3	0.00
Norway	1	0	0	1	2	7	−5	0.00
Sweden	1	0	0	1	0	2	−2	0.00
Total	9	1	1	7	6	30	−24	11.11

== 1999 FIFA Women's World Cup ==
=== Group D ===
Pos	Team	Pld	W	D	L	GF	GA	GD	Pts	Qualification
1	China	3	3	0	0	12	2	+10	9	Advance to knockout stage
2	Sweden	3	2	0	1	6	3	+3	6	Advance to knockout stage
3	Australia	3	0	1	2	3	7	−4	1	
4	Ghana	3	0	1	2	1	10	−9	1	

Source: FIFA
Rules for classification: Group stage tiebreakers
20 June 1999
19:30 EDT (UTC−4)

Australia	1–1	Ghana
Murray 74'	Report	Gyamfua 76'

Foxboro Stadium, Foxborough
Attendance: 14,867
Referee: Kari Seitz (United States)
23 June 1999
20:30 PDT (UTC−7)

China	7–0	Ghana
Sun W. 9', 21', 54'; Jin Y. 16'; Zhang O.Y. 82', 90+1'; Zhao L.H. 90+2'	Report

Civic Stadium, Portland
Attendance: 17,668
Referee: Elke Günthner (Germany)
26 June 1999
16:00 CDT (UTC−5)

Ghana	0–2	Sweden
	Report	Svensson 58', 86'

Soldier Field, Chicago
Attendance: 34,256
Referee: Sonia Denoncourt (Canada)

== 2003 FIFA Women's World Cup ==
=== Group D ===
Pos	Team	Pld	W	D	L	GF	GA	GD	Pts	Qualification
1	China	3	2	1	0	3	1	+2	7	Advance to knockout stage
2	Russia	3	2	0	1	5	2	+3	6	Advance to knockout stage
3	Ghana	3	1	0	2	2	5	−3	3	
4	Australia	3	0	1	2	3	5	−2	1	

Source: FIFA
Rules for classification: Group stage tiebreakers
21 September 2003
17:15 PDT

China	1–0	Ghana
Sun W. 29'	Report

The Home Depot Center, Carson
Attendance: 10,027
Referee: Sonia Denoncourt (Canada)
25 September 2003
16:15 PDT

Ghana	0–3	Russia
	Report	Saenko 36'; Barbashina 54'; Letyushova 80'

The Home Depot Center, Carson
Attendance: 13,929
Referee: Kari Seitz (United States)
28 September 2003
17:15 PDT

Ghana	2–1	Australia
Sackey 34', 39'	Report	Garriock 61'

PGE Park, Portland
Attendance: 19,132
Referee: Xonam Agboyi (Togo)

== 2007 FIFA Women's World Cup ==
=== Group C ===
Pos	Team	Pld	W	D	L	GF	GA	GD	Pts	Qualification
1	Norway	3	2	1	0	10	4	+6	7	Advance to knockout stage
2	Australia	3	1	2	0	7	4	+3	5	Advance to knockout stage
3	Canada	3	1	1	1	7	4	+3	4	
4	Ghana	3	0	0	3	3	15	−12	0	

Source: FIFA
Rules for classification: Group stage tiebreakers
12 September 2007
17:00

Australia	4–1	Ghana
Walsh 15'; De Vanna 57', 81'; Garriock 69'	Report	Amankwa 70'

Yellow Dragon Stadium, Hangzhou
Attendance: 25,952
Referee: Adriana Correa (Colombia)
15 September 2007
17:00

Canada	4–0	Ghana
Sinclair 16', 62'; Schmidt 55'; Franko 77'	Report

Yellow Dragon Stadium, Hangzhou
Attendance: 33,835
Referee: Nicole Petignat (Switzerland)
20 September 2007
17:00

Norway	7–2	Ghana
Storløkken 4'; R. Gulbrandsen 39', 59', 62'; Horpestad 45' (pen.); Herlovsen 56'; Klaveness 69'	Report	Bayor 73'; Okoe 80' (pen.)

Yellow Dragon Stadium, Hangzhou
Attendance: 43,817
Referee: Jennifer Bennet (United States)

== Goalscorers ==
Player	Goals	1999	2003	2007
Alberta Sackey	2		2	
Anita Amankwa	1			1
Adjoa Bayor	1			1
Nana Gyamfua	1	1		
Florence Okoe	1			1
Total	6	1	2	3
