= FIFA Women's World Cup awards =

Women's football awards

At the end of each FIFA Women's World Cup final tournament, several awards are presented to the players and teams which have distinguished themselves in various aspects of the game.

== Awards ==
Squad members and coaching staff of the national teams placing first, second, and third in the tournament receive gold, silver, and bronze medals, respectively. The World Cup champions do not retain the FIFA World Cup Trophy after winning it.

There are currently five post-tournament awards from the FIFA Technical Study Group:

- the Golden Ball (currently commercially termed "adidas Golden Ball") for the best overall player of the tournament (first awarded in 1991);
- the Golden Boot (currently commercially termed "adidas Golden Boot", formerly known as the Golden Shoe) for the top goalscorer of the tournament (first awarded in 1991);
- the Golden Glove (currently commercially termed "adidas Golden Glove", formerly known as the Best Goalkeeper) for the best goalkeeper of the tournament (first awarded in 2003);
- the FIFA Young Player Award for the best player of the tournament under 21 years of age at the start of the calendar year (first awarded in 2011);
- the FIFA Fair Play Trophy for the team with the best record of fair play during the tournament (first awarded in 1991).

There is currently one award voted on by fans during the tournament:

- the Player of the Match (currently commercially termed "VISA Player of the Match") for outstanding performance by a player during each match of the tournament (first awarded in 2003).

There is currently one award voted on by fans after the conclusion of the tournament:

- the Goal of the Tournament (currently commercially termed "Hyundai Goal of the Tournament") for the fans' best goal scored during the tournament (first awarded in 2007).

The following five awards are no longer given:

- the All-Star Squad for the best squad of players of the tournament (chosen by the technical study group, awarded from 1999 to 2015);
- the Most Entertaining Team for the team that entertained the fans the most during the tournament (voted on by fans after the conclusion of the tournament, awarded in 2003 and 2007);
- the FANtasy All-Star Team for the fans' best eleven-player line-up of the tournament (voted on by fans after the conclusion of the tournament, awarded in 2003);
- the Dream Team for the fans' best manager and eleven-player line-up of the tournament (voted on by fans after the conclusion of the tournament, awarded in 2015);
- the Players Who Dared to Shine for ten key players of the tournament who "dared to shine" (chosen by the technical study group, awarded in 2019).

== Golden Ball ==
The Golden Ball award is presented to the best player at each FIFA World Cup final, with a shortlist drawn up by the FIFA technical committee and the winner voted for by representatives of the media. Those who finish as runners-up in the vote receive the Silver Ball and Bronze Ball awards as the second and third most outstanding players in the tournament respectively.

World Cup	Golden Ball	Silver Ball	Bronze Ball
1991 China	(United States) Carin Jennings	(United States) Michelle Akers	(Norway) Linda Medalen
1995 Sweden	(Norway) Hege Riise	(Norway) Gro Espeseth	(Norway) Ann Kristin Aarønes
1999 United States	(China) Sun Wen	(Brazil) Sissi	(United States) Michelle Akers
2003 United States	(Germany) Birgit Prinz	(Sweden) Victoria Svensson	(Germany) Maren Meinert
2007 China	(Brazil) Marta	(Germany) Birgit Prinz	(Brazil) Cristiane
2011 Germany	(Japan) Homare Sawa	(United States) Abby Wambach	(United States) Hope Solo
2015 Canada	(United States) Carli Lloyd	(France) Amandine Henry	(Japan) Aya Miyama
2019 France	(United States) Megan Rapinoe	(England) Lucy Bronze	(United States) Rose Lavelle
2023 Australia/New Zealand	(Spain) Aitana Bonmatí	(Spain) Jennifer Hermoso	(Sweden) Amanda Ilestedt

== Golden Boot ==
The Golden Boot is awarded to the top goalscorer of the Women's World Cup. It was introduced as the Golden Shoe at the 1991 Women's World Cup, and was changed to the Golden Boot in 2011.

If more than one player finishes the tournament with the same number of goals, the tie goes to the player who has contributed the most assists (with the FIFA Technical Study Group deciding whether an assist is to be counted as such). If there is still a tie, the award goes to the player who has played the least amount of time (most goals per minute).

Silver and Bronze Boots are awarded to the second- and third-placed players.

World Cup	Golden Boot	Goals	Silver Boot	Goals	Bronze Boot	Goals
1991 China	(United States) Michelle Akers	10	(Germany) Heidi Mohr	7	(Norway) Linda Medalen (United States) Carin Jennings	6
1995 Sweden	(Norway) Ann Kristin Aarønes	6	(Norway) Hege Riise	5	(China) Shi Guihong	3
1999 United States	(China) Sun Wen (Brazil) Sissi	7			(Norway) Ann Kristin Aarønes	4
2003 United States	(Germany) Birgit Prinz	7	(Germany) Maren Meinert	4	(Brazil) Kátia	4
2007 China	(Brazil) Marta	7	(United States) Abby Wambach	6	(Norway) Ragnhild Gulbrandsen	6
2011 Germany	(Japan) Homare Sawa	5	(Brazil) Marta	4	(United States) Abby Wambach	4
2015 Canada	(Germany) Célia Šašić	6	(United States) Carli Lloyd	6	(Germany) Anja Mittag	5
2019 France	(United States) Megan Rapinoe	6	(United States) Alex Morgan	6	(England) Ellen White	6
2023 Australia/New Zealand	(Japan) Hinata Miyazawa	5	(France) Kadidiatou Diani	4	(Germany) Alexandra Popp	4

== Golden Glove ==
The Golden Glove award recognizes the best goalkeeper of the tournament since 2011. In 2003 and 2007, a Best Goalkeeper award was given, and in 1999 two goalkeepers were named to an All-Star Team. The FIFA Technical Study Group recognises the top goalkeeper of the tournament based on the player's performance throughout the final competition. Although goalkeepers have this specific award for their position, they are eligible for the Golden Ball as well.

World Cup	BG / Golden Glove Award	Clean sheets
1999 United States	(China) Gao Hong	4
1999 United States	(United States) Briana Scurry	4
2003 United States	(Germany) Silke Rottenberg	2
2007 China	(Germany) Nadine Angerer	6
2011 Germany	(United States) Hope Solo	2
2015 Canada	(United States) Hope Solo	5
2019 France	(Netherlands) Sari van Veenendaal	3
2023 Australia/New Zealand	(England) Mary Earps	3

== FIFA Young Player Award ==
The FIFA Young Player Award is given to the best player in the tournament who is at most 21 years old. For the 2019 FIFA Women's World Cup this meant that the player had to have been born on or after 1 January 1998. The FIFA Technical Study Group recognises the Best Young Player of the tournament based on the player's performances throughout the final competition.

World Cup	Best Young Player Award	Age
2011 Germany	(Australia) Caitlin Foord	16
2015 Canada	(Canada) Kadeisha Buchanan	19
2019 France	(Germany) Giulia Gwinn	20
2023 Australia/New Zealand	(Spain) Salma Paralluelo	19

== FIFA Fair Play Trophy ==
The FIFA Fair Play Trophy is given to the team with the best record of fair play during the World Cup final tournament. Only teams that qualified for the second round are considered. The winners of this award earn the FIFA Fair Play Trophy, a diploma, a fair play medal for each player and official, and $50,000 worth of football equipment to be used for youth development.

World Cup	FIFA Fair Play Trophy Winners
1991 China	Germany
1995 Sweden	Sweden
1999 United States	China
2003 United States	China
2007 China	Norway
2011 Germany	Japan
2015 Canada	France
2019 France	France
2023 Australia/New Zealand	Japan

== Player of the Match ==
The Player of the Match (POTM) award picks the outstanding player in every match of the tournament since 2003.

While the awards from 2003 to 2015 were chosen by the technical study group, from 2019 the winner has been chosen through an online poll on FIFA's website.

Leading player of the match winners by tournament
World Cup	Player(s) with most POTM wins	Wins
2003 United States	(Germany) Birgit Prinz (Germany) Bettina Wiegmann (Norway) Dagny Mellgren (Sweden) Victoria Svensson	2
2007 China	(Brazil) Daniela (Brazil) Marta (England) Kelly Smith (Germany) Nadine Angerer (Germany) Birgit Prinz (Norway) Ane Stangeland Horpestad	2
2011 Germany	(Japan) Aya Miyama (Japan) Homare Sawa (Sweden) Lotta Schelin (United States) Abby Wambach	2
2015 Canada	(United States) Carli Lloyd	4
2019 France	(United States) Megan Rapinoe	3
2023 Australia/New Zealand	(Japan) Hinata Miyazawa (Sweden) Amanda Ilestedt	3

Leading player of the match winners all-time
Rank	Player	Wins	World Cup(s) with awards
1	(Brazil) Marta	5	2003, 2007, 2011, 2019
1	(Japan) Aya Miyama	5	2011, 2015
1	(United States) Carli Lloyd	5	2011, 2015
4	(Germany) Birgit Prinz	4	2003, 2007
4	(United States) Megan Rapinoe	4	2015, 2019
6	(Brazil) Daniela	3	2003, 2007
6	(France) Amandine Henry	3	2015, 2019
6	(Germany) Nadine Angerer	3	2007, 2015
6	(Germany) Alexandra Popp	3	2019, 2023
6	(Japan) Homare Sawa	3	2007, 2011
6	(Japan) Hinata Miyazawa	3	2023
6	(Netherlands) Lieke Martens	3	2015, 2019
6	(Sweden) Amanda Ilestedt	3	2023
6	(Sweden) Lotta Schelin	3	2007, 2011
6	(United States) Alex Morgan	3	2019, 2023
6	(United States) Abby Wambach	3	2007, 2011

Player of the match award winners by country
Rank	Country	Awards
1	United States	25
2	Germany	24
3	Sweden	22
4	England	20
4	Japan	20
6	Brazil	17
7	Australia	15
8	France	14
9	Norway	13
10	Netherlands	11
11	Canada	8
11	China	8
13	Nigeria	7
13	Spain	7
15	Colombia	5
16	Italy	4
16	Switzerland	4
18	Cameroon	3
18	Denmark	3
18	Jamaica	3
18	Mexico	3
18	New Zealand	3
18	North Korea	3
24	Argentina	2
24	Chile	2
24	Costa Rica	2
24	Ghana	2
24	Morocco	2
24	Republic of Ireland	2
24	Russia	2
24	South Africa	2
32	Philippines	1
32	Portugal	1
32	South Korea	1
32	Scotland	1
32	Thailand	1
32	Zambia	1

Player of the match award winners in the final
Final	Player	Opponent
2003 United States	(Germany) Bettina Wiegmann	Sweden
2007 China	(Germany) Nadine Angerer	Brazil
2011 Germany	(Japan) Ayumi Kaihori	United States
2015 Canada	(United States) Carli Lloyd	Japan
2019 France	(United States) Megan Rapinoe	Netherlands
2023 Australia/New Zealand	(Spain) Olga Carmona	England

== All-Star Squad ==
World Cup	Goalkeepers	Defenders	Midfielders	Forwards
1999 United States	(China) Gao Hong (United States) Briana Scurry	(China) Wang Liping (China) Wen Lirong (Germany) Doris Fitschen (United States) Brandi Chastain (United States) Carla Overbeck	(Brazil) Sissi (China) Liu Ailing (China) Zhao Lihong (Germany) Bettina Wiegmann (United States) Michelle Akers	(China) Jin Yan (China) Sun Wen (Norway) Ann Kristin Aarønes (United States) Mia Hamm
2003 United States	(Germany) Silke Rottenberg	(China) Wang Liping (Germany) Sandra Minnert (United States) Joy Fawcett	(Germany) Bettina Wiegmann (Sweden) Malin Moström (United States) Shannon Boxx	(Canada) Charmaine Hooper (Germany) Maren Meinert (Germany) Birgit Prinz (Sweden) Victoria Svensson
2007 China	(Germany) Nadine Angerer (Norway) Bente Nordby	(Germany) Ariane Hingst (China) Li Jie (Norway) Ane Stangeland Horpestad (Germany) Kerstin Stegemann	(Brazil) Daniela (Brazil) Formiga (England) Kelly Smith (Germany) Renate Lingor (Norway) Ingvild Stensland (United States) Kristine Lilly	(Australia) Lisa De Vanna (Brazil) Marta (Brazil) Cristiane (Germany) Birgit Prinz
2011 Germany	(United States) Hope Solo (Japan) Ayumi Kaihori	(Australia) Elise Kellond-Knight (Brazil) Erika (England) Alex Scott (France) Sonia Bompastor (France) Laura Georges (Germany) Saskia Bartusiak	(England) Jill Scott (Equatorial Guinea) Genoveva Añonma (France) Louisa Necib (Japan) Aya Miyama (Japan) Shinobu Ohno (Japan) Homare Sawa (Germany) Kerstin Garefrekes (Sweden) Caroline Seger (United States) Shannon Boxx (United States) Lauren Cheney	(Brazil) Marta (Sweden) Lotta Schelin (United States) Abby Wambach
2015 Canada	(England) Karen Bardsley (Germany) Nadine Angerer (United States) Hope Solo	(Canada) Kadeisha Buchanan (England) Lucy Bronze (England) Steph Houghton (France) Wendie Renard (Japan) Saori Ariyoshi (United States) Julie Johnston (United States) Meghan Klingenberg	(Australia) Elise Kellond-Knight (France) Amandine Henry (France) Eugénie Le Sommer (Japan) Aya Miyama (Japan) Mizuho Sakaguchi (Japan) Rumi Utsugi (United States) Carli Lloyd (United States) Megan Rapinoe	(Australia) Lisa De Vanna (France) Élodie Thomis (Germany) Anja Mittag (Germany) Célia Šašić (Switzerland) Ramona Bachmann

=== Other all-star selections ===
==== FANtasy All-Star Team ====
The "FANtasy All-Star Team", which was sponsored by MasterCard, featured eleven players decided by a poll on FIFA.com.

World Cup	Goalkeeper	Defenders	Midfielders	Forwards
2003 United States	(United States) Briana Scurry	(Brazil) Juliana (Canada) Charmaine Hooper (Canada) Sharolta Nonen (Germany) Sandra Minnert	(Germany) Bettina Wiegmann (United States) Julie Foudy (United States) Kristine Lilly	(Germany) Maren Meinert (Germany) Birgit Prinz (United States) Mia Hamm

==== Dream Team ====
World Cup	Goalkeepers	Defenders	Midfielders	Forwards	Manager
2015 Canada	(United States) Hope Solo	(Canada) Kadeisha Buchanan (France) Wendie Renard (United States) Julie Johnston (United States) Ali Krieger	(Japan) Aya Miyama (United States) Carli Lloyd (United States) Megan Rapinoe	(Germany) Anja Mittag (Germany) Célia Šašić (United States) Alex Morgan	(Germany) Silvia Neid

==== Players Who Dared to Shine ====
The FIFA Technical Study Group announced a list of ten key players of the tournament who "dared to shine".

World Cup	Goalkeeper	Defenders	Midfielders	Forwards
2019 France	(Netherlands) Sari van Veenendaal	(England) Lucy Bronze (United States) Crystal Dunn	(England) Jill Scott (United States) Julie Ertz (United States) Rose Lavelle	(England) Ellen White (Netherlands) Vivianne Miedema (Sweden) Sofia Jakobsson (United States) Megan Rapinoe

== Goal of the Tournament ==
The Goal of the Tournament award was awarded for the first time at the 2007 FIFA Women's World Cup.

- Scores and results list the goal tally of the players' team first.

=== Winners ===
World Cup	Player	Scored against	Score	Minute	Result	Round	Details	Ref.
2007 China	(Brazil) Marta	United States	4–0	79'	4–0	Semi-finals	Marta's second goal in the match, a solo effort	
2011 Germany	(United States) Abby Wambach	Brazil	2–2	120+2' (e.t.)	2–2 (a.e.t.) (5–3 p)	Quarter-finals	Last-minute headed equaliser in additional time of the second half of extra time and sending the match to a penalty shoot-out	
2015 Canada	(United States) Carli Lloyd	Japan	4–0	16'	5–2	Final	Lloyd's third goal in the final, scored from the midfield line	
2019 France	(Brazil) Cristiane	Australia	2–0	38'	2–3	Group stage	Brazil's second goal in their second group stage match, scored via a header	
2023 Australia/New Zealand	(Colombia) Linda Caicedo	Germany	1–0	52'	2–1	Group stage	Colombia's first goal in their second group stage match, a solo effort	

=== Nominees ===
World Cup	Rank	Player	Scored against	Score	Minute	Result	Round	Ref.
2007 China	1	(Brazil) Marta	United States	4–0	79'	4–0	Semi-finals	
2007 China	2	(Brazil) Cristiane	Australia	3–2	75'	3–2	Quarter-finals	
2007 China	2	(Brazil) Formiga	Australia	1–0	4'	3–2	Quarter-finals	
2007 China	4	(United States) Abby Wambach	Sweden	2–0	58'	2–0	Group stage	
2007 China	4	(Australia) Lisa De Vanna	Norway	1–1	83'	1–1	Group stage	
2007 China	6	(Germany) Kerstin Garefrekes	North Korea	1–0	44'	3–0	Quarter-finals	
2007 China	7	(North Korea) Ri Un-suk	Sweden	1–1	22'	1–2	Group stage	
2007 China	8	(China) Song Xiaoli	Denmark	3–2	88'	3–2	Group stage	
2007 China	9	(Australia) Heather Garriock	Ghana	3–0	69'	4–1	Group stage	
2007 China	10	(Japan) Aya Miyama	England	2–2	90+5'	2–2	Group stage	
2011 Germany	1	(United States) Abby Wambach	Brazil	2–2	120+2' (e.t.)	2–2 (a.e.t.) (5–3 p)	Quarter-finals	
2011 Germany	2	(Japan) Nahomi Kawasumi	Sweden	3–1	64'	3–1	Semi-finals	
2011 Germany	3	(Sweden) Marie Hammarström	France	2–1	82'	2–1	Third place play-off	
2011 Germany	4	(Brazil) Érika	Equatorial Guinea	1–0	49'	3–0	Group stage	
2011 Germany	5	(Australia) Ellyse Perry	Sweden	1–2	40'	1–3	Quarter-finals	
2011 Germany	6	(Japan) Karina Maruyama	Germany	1–0	108' (e.t.)	1–0 (a.e.t.)	Quarter-finals	
2011 Germany	7	(United States) Heather O'Reilly	Colombia	1–0	12'	3–0	Group stage	
2011 Germany	8	(Canada) Christine Sinclair	Germany	1–2	82'	1–2	Group stage	
2011 Germany	9	(France) Élise Bussaglia	England	1–1	88'	1–1 (a.e.t.) (4–3 p)	Quarter-finals	
2011 Germany	10	(France) Gaëtane Thiney	Canada	2–0	60'	4–0	Group stage	
2015 Canada	1	(United States) Carli Lloyd	Japan	4–0	16'	5–2	Final	
2015 Canada	2	(Colombia) Daniela Montoya	Mexico	1–1	82'	1–1	Group stage	
2015 Canada	3	(England) Lucy Bronze	Norway	2–1	76'	2–1	Round of 16	
2015 Canada	4	(United States) Lauren Holiday	Japan	3–0	14'	5–2	Final	
2015 Canada	5	(Netherlands) Lieke Martens	New Zealand	1–0	33'	1–0	Group stage	
2015 Canada	6	(Australia) Lisa De Vanna	United States	1–1	27'	1–3	Group stage	
2015 Canada	7	(Norway) Maren Mjelde	Germany	1–1	61'	1–1	Group stage	
2015 Canada	8	(France) Amandine Henry	Mexico	5–0	80'	5–0	Group stage	
2015 Canada	9	(Japan) Mizuho Sakaguchi	Netherlands	2–0	78'	2–1	Round of 16	
2015 Canada	10	(Switzerland) Ramona Bachmann	Ecuador	7–0	61'	10–1	Group stage	
2019 France	1	(Brazil) Cristiane	Australia	2–0	38'	2–3	Group stage	
2019 France	2	(Cameroon) Ajara Nchout	New Zealand	2–1	90+5'	2–1	Group stage	
2019 France	3	(Netherlands) Jackie Groenen	Sweden	1–0	99' (e.t.)	1–0 (a.e.t.)	Semi-finals	
2019 France	4	(England) Lucy Bronze	Norway	3–0	57'	3–0	Quarter-finals	
2019 France	5	(Italy) Aurora Galli	Jamaica	4–0	71'	5–0	Group stage	
2019 France	6	(United States) Alex Morgan	Thailand	8–0	74'	13–0	Group stage	
2019 France	7	(Nigeria) Asisat Oshoala	South Korea	2–0	75'	2–0	Group stage	
2019 France	8	(Japan) Yui Hasegawa	Netherlands	1–1	43'	1–2	Round of 16	
2019 France	9	(France) Amandine Henry	South Korea	4–0	85'	4–0	Group stage	
2019 France	10	(Sweden) Sofia Jakobsson	England	2–0	22'	2–1	Third place play-off	
2023 Australia/New Zealand	1	(Colombia) Linda Caicedo	Germany	1–0	52'	2–1	Group stage	
2023 Australia/New Zealand	2	(Panama) Marta Cox	France	1–0	2'	3–6	Group stage	
2023 Australia/New Zealand	Unranked	(Spain) Aitana Bonmatí	Switzerland	3–1	36'	5–1	Round of 16	
2023 Australia/New Zealand	Unranked	(Argentina) Sophia Braun	South Africa	1–2	74'	2–2	Group stage	
2023 Australia/New Zealand	Unranked	(Netherlands) Esmee Brugts	Vietnam	6–0	57'	7–0	Group stage	
2023 Australia/New Zealand	Unranked	(England) Lauren James	China	4–1	65'	6–1	Group stage	
2023 Australia/New Zealand	Unranked	(Australia) Sam Kerr	England	1–1	63'	1–3	Semi-finals	
2023 Australia/New Zealand	Unranked	(Republic of Ireland) Katie McCabe	Canada	1–0	4'	1–2	Group stage	
2023 Australia/New Zealand	Unranked	(Japan) Mina Tanaka	Spain	4–0	82'	4–0	Group stage	
2023 Australia/New Zealand	Unranked	(Brazil) Bia Zaneratto	Panama	3–0	48'	4–0	Group stage	

=== All-time best goal ===
In 2003, FIFA.com held a poll for the greatest goal in Women's World Cup history (from 1991 to 1999).

The 1991 goal from Michelle Akers-Stahl won the poll.

Date	Player	Scored against	Score	Minute	Result	Round	Details
24 November 1991	(United States) Michelle Akers-Stahl	Chinese Taipei	2–0	29'	7–0	Quarter-finals	Akers-Stahl's second of five goals in the match, a free kick

The similar "15 for 2015" poll was held from 11 May to 5 June 2015, encompassing the best goals from 1991 to 2011.

Abby Wambach, who won the Goal of the Tournament in 2011, was chosen.

Date	Player	Scored against	Score	Minute	Result	Round	Details
10 July 2011	(United States) Abby Wambach	Brazil	2–2	120+2' (e.t.)	2–2 (a.e.t.) (5–3 p)	Quarter-finals	Last-minute headed equaliser in additional time of the second half of extra time and sending the match to a penalty shoot-out

== Most Entertaining Team ==
World Cup	Most Entertaining Team Award
2003 United States	Germany
2007 China	Brazil

== See also ==
- FIFA World Cup awards
- UEFA European Championship awards
- Copa América awards
- Africa Cup of Nations awards
- AFC Asian Cup awards
- CONCACAF Gold Cup awards
- OFC Men's Nations Cup awards
- List of sports awards honoring women
