= List of Ghana women's international footballers =

This is a list of Ghana women's international footballers who have played for the Ghana women's national football team.

== Players ==
Name	Caps	Goals	National team years	Club(s)
Ernestina Abambila	1+	0+	–	(Poland) UKS SMS Łódź
Hamdya Abass	1+	0+	–	(Ghana) Ghatel Ladies
Mukarama Abdulai	1+	0+	–	(Ghana) Northern Ladies FC, (Spain) Deportivo Alavés
Juliet Acheampong	1+	0+	–	(Ghana) Ashtown Ladies, (Sweden) Ånge IF
Azume Adams	1+	0+	–	(Ghana) Hasaacas Ladies
Grace Adams	1+	0+	–	(Nigeria) Rivers Angels, (Lebanon) SAS, (Ghana) Berry Ladies
Elizabeth Addo	1+	0+	–	(Nigeria) Rivers Angels, (Serbia) ŽFK Spartak Subotica, (Hungary) Ferencvárosi TC
Vivian Adjei	1+	0+	–	(Ghana) Thunder Queens
Cynthia Adobea	1+	0+	–	(Ghana) Reformers Ladies
Agnes Aduako	1+	0+	–	(Ghana) Fabulous Ladies
Princella Adubea	1+	0+	–	(Ghana) Ampem Darkoa Ladies, (Spain) Racing de Santander
Anita Amankwa	1+	0+	–	(Ghana) Takoradi Ladies
Anita Amenuku	1+	0+	–	(Ghana) Ghatel Ladies
Gladys Amfobea	1+	0+	–	(Ghana) Lady Strikers
Olivia Amoako	1+	0+	–	(Ghana) Ghatel Ladies
Basilea Amoa-Tetteh	1+	0+	–	Unknown
Faustina Ampah	1+	0+	–	Unknown
Rosemary Ampem	1+	0+	–	(Ghana) Blessed Ladies, (Belarus) FC Minsk
Diana Ankomah	1+	0+	–	(Ghana) Police Accra
Lydia Ankrah	1+	0+	–	(Ghana) Post Ladies
Akua Anokyewaa	1+	0+	–	Unknown
Regina Ansah	1+	0+	–	(Ghana) Bluna Ladies
Regina Antwi	1+	0+	–	(Ghana) Hasaacas Ladies, (Hungary) Diósgyőri VTK women, (Turkey) 1207 Antalya Spor
Grace Asantewaa	1+	0+	–	(Ghana) Ampem Darkoa Ladies, (Spain) Logroño, (Spain) Real Betis
Nana Asantewaa	1+	0+	–	(Ghana) Police Accra
Grace Asare	1+	0+	–	(Ghana) Reformers Ladies
Philicity Asuako	1+	0+	–	(Ghana) Thunder Queens, (Ghana) Police Ladies
Edem Atovor	1+	0+	–	(Ghana) Lady Strikers, (Israel) Hapoel Petah Tikva
Yaa Avoe	1+	0+	–	(Ghana) Ash Town Ladies
Doreen Awuah	1+	0+	–	(Ghana) Ghatel Ladies
Jane Ayiyem	1+	0+	–	(Ghana) Police Ladies
Evelyn Badu	1+	0+	–	(Ghana) Hasaacas Ladies
Elizabeth Baidu	1+	0+	–	(Ghana) Bluna Ladies
Adjoa Bayor	1+	0+	–	(United States) FC Indiana, (Ghana) Ghatel Ladies, (Germany) FF USV Jena,
Mary Berko	1+	0+	–	(Ghana) Police Accra
Portia Boakye	1+	0+	–	(Ghana) Fabulous Ladies, (Sweden) Östersunds DFF, (Hungary) Ferencvárosi TC, (Sweden) Djurgårdens IF
Genevive Clottey	1+	0+	–	Unknown
Ellen Coleman	1+	0+	–	(Ghana) Lady Strikers
Elizabeth Cudjoe	1+	0+	–	(Ghana) Hasaacas Ladies
Mavis Danso	1+	0+	–	(United States) Robert Morris College
Memuna Darku	1+	0+	–	(Ghana) Ghatel Ladies
Mavis Dgajmah	1+	0+	–	(Ghana) La Ladies
Wasila Diwura-Soale	1+	0+	–	(Ghana) Hasaacas Ladies
Fafali Dumehasi	1+	0+	–	(Ghana) Police Ladies
Janet Egyir	1+	0+	–	(Ghana) Hasaacas Ladies
Gladys Enti	1+	0+	–	(Ghana) Ghatel Ladies
Linda Eshun	1+	0+	–	(Ghana) Hasaacas Ladies
Mary Essiful	1+	0+	–	(Ghana) Soccer Intellectuals Ladies
Gloria Foriwa	1+	0+	–	(Ghana) Ghatel Ladies
Nana Gyamfuah	1+	0+	–	(Ghana) Postal Ladies
Priscilla Hagan	1+	0+	–	(Romania) Olimpia Cluj, (Turkey) Konak Belediyespor, (Poland) AP Lotos Gdańsk, (Slovenia) Pomurje
Aminatu Ibrahim	1+	0+	–	(Ghana) Ghatel Ladies
Juliana Kakraba	1+	0+	–	(Ghana) Ghatel Ladies
Belinda Kanda	1+	0+	–	(United States) Alabama A&M Lady Bulldogs
Hillia Kobblah	1+	0+	–	(Ghana) Faith Ladies
Alice Kusi	1+	0+	–	(Ghana) Fabulous Ladies, (Lebanon) Zouk Mosbeh, (Jordan) Shabab Al-Ordon, (Serbia) ŽFK Spartak Subotica
Patricia Mantey	1+	0+	–	(Ghana) Immigration Accra, (Nigeria) Rivers Angels
Priscilla Mensah	1+	0+	–	(Ghana) Postal Ladies
Vivian Mensah	1+	0+	–	(Ghana) La Ladies
Fati Mohammed	1+	0+	–	(United States) Robert Morris Eagles
Alima Moro	1+	0+	–	(Ghana) Bolga Ghatel Ladies, (Italy) ASD Lighi, (Italy) C.F. Marostica, (Italy) CF Trevignano
Mercy Myles	1+	0+	–	(Ghana) Reformers Ladies
Lily Niber-Lawrence	1+	0+	–	(Ghana) Hasaacas Ladies, (Spain) Extremadura
Nina Norshie				(Ghana) Berry Ladies
Patricia Ofori				(Ghana) Mawuena Ladies, (United States) Alabama A&M Lady Bulldogs
Sheila Okai				(Ghana) Ghatel Ladies
Florence Okoe				(Ghana) Ghatel Ladies
Priscilla Okyere				(Ghana) Ampem Darkoa Ladies, (Serbia) ŽFK Spartak Subotica, (Spain) Rayo Vallecano, (Lithuania) Gintra Universitetas
Sonia Opoku				(Ghana) Ampem Darkoa Ladies
Vida Opoku				(Ghana) Olympique Marseille Ladies
Myralyn Osei Agyemang				(United States) Portland Rain
Sandra Owusu-Ansah				(Ghana) Fabulous Ladies, (Ghana) Supreme Ladies, (Lebanon) Zouk Mosbeh, (Serbia) ŽFK Spartak Subotica
Janet Owusu				(Ghana) La Ladies, (Austria) SV Neulengbach
Millot Abena Pokuaa				(Ghana) Hasaacas Ladies
Stella Quartey				(Ghana) Ghatel Ladies
Agnes Quaye				(Ghana) Immigration Accra
Safia Abdul Rahman				(Ghana) Ghatel Ladies
Alberta Sackey				Unknown
Patience Sackey				Unknown
Memunatu Sulemana				(Ghana) Post Ladies
Sherifatu Sumaila				(United States) California Storm, (Sweden) Djurgårdens IF, (Sweden) Mallbackens IF
Mercy Tagoe				(Ghana) Bluna Ladies
Rumanatu Tahiru				(Ghana) Athleta Ladies
Barikisu Tettey-Quao				(Ghana) La Ladies
Justice Tweneboaa				(Ghana) Ampem Darkoa Ladies
Anita Wiredu-Minta				(Ghana) Ghatel Ladies, (Ghana) Immigration Ladies
Kulu Yahaya				(Ghana) Ashiaman Ladies
Rita Yeboah				(Ghana) Bluna Ladies
Leticia Zikpi				(Ghana) Immigration Accra

== See also ==
- Ghana women's national football team
