= FIFA Young Player Award =

FIFA Young Player Award may refer to:

- FIFA World Cup Young Player Award, FIFA World Cup for best young player of tournament
- FIFA Women's World Cup Young Player Award, FIFA Women's World Cup for best young player of tournament
