= Aminatu =

Aminatu is a given name it may refer to:

- Aminatou Haidar, often known simply as Aminatu, a human-rights defender and political activist from Western Sahara
- Amina (Queen of Zazzau), also known as Aminatu, a Muslim princess and military leader from Nigeria
- Aminatu Ibrahim, a football (soccer) player on the Ghana women's national football team
