= Storløkken =

Storløkken is a Norwegian surname. Notable people with the surname include:

- Lene Storløkken (born 1981), Norwegian footballer
- Ståle Storløkken (born 1969), Norwegian jazz musician and composer
