= Tianjin Olympic Centre =

Sports venue in Tianjin, China

Tianjin Olympic Center 天津奥林匹克中心
- Water Drop
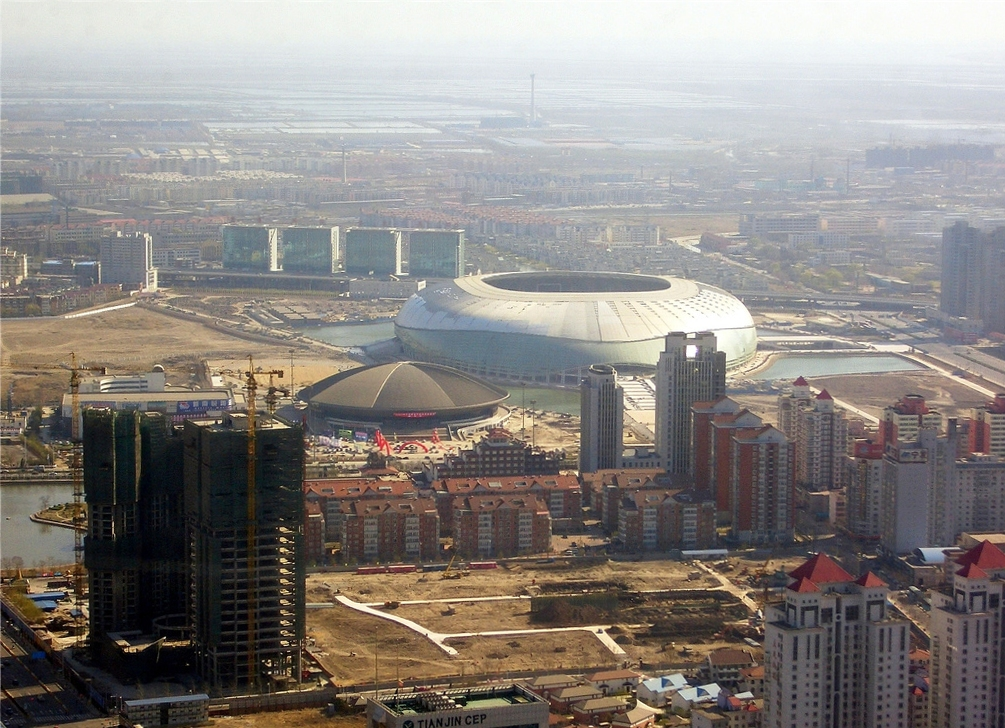
- Tianjin Olympic Center in April 2007
- Interactive map of Tianjin Olympic Center 天津奥林匹克中心
- Location: Tianjin, China
- Coordinates: 39°4′24″N 117°10′10″E
- Owner: Tianjin Government
- Operator: IRENA Group
- Capacity: 54,696
- Public transit: at Tiyuzhongxin

Construction
- Built: 2003–2007
- Opened: August 2007
- Cost: 1.5 billion RMB
- Architect: AXS Satow

Tenants
- Tianjin Jinmen Tiger; Tianjin Tianhai (formerly)

The Tianjin Olympic Centre (simplified Chinese: 天津奥林匹克中心; traditional Chinese: 天津奧林匹克中心; pinyin: Tiānjīn Àolínpǐkè Zhōngxīn), often colloquially referred to as the Water Drop (Chinese: 水滴; pinyin: Shuǐdī), is a sports complex with a multi-use stadium named Tianjin Olympic Centre Stadium in Tianjin, China. Construction started in August 2003 and was completed in August 2007. It was the home stadium of Tianjin Jinmen Tiger.

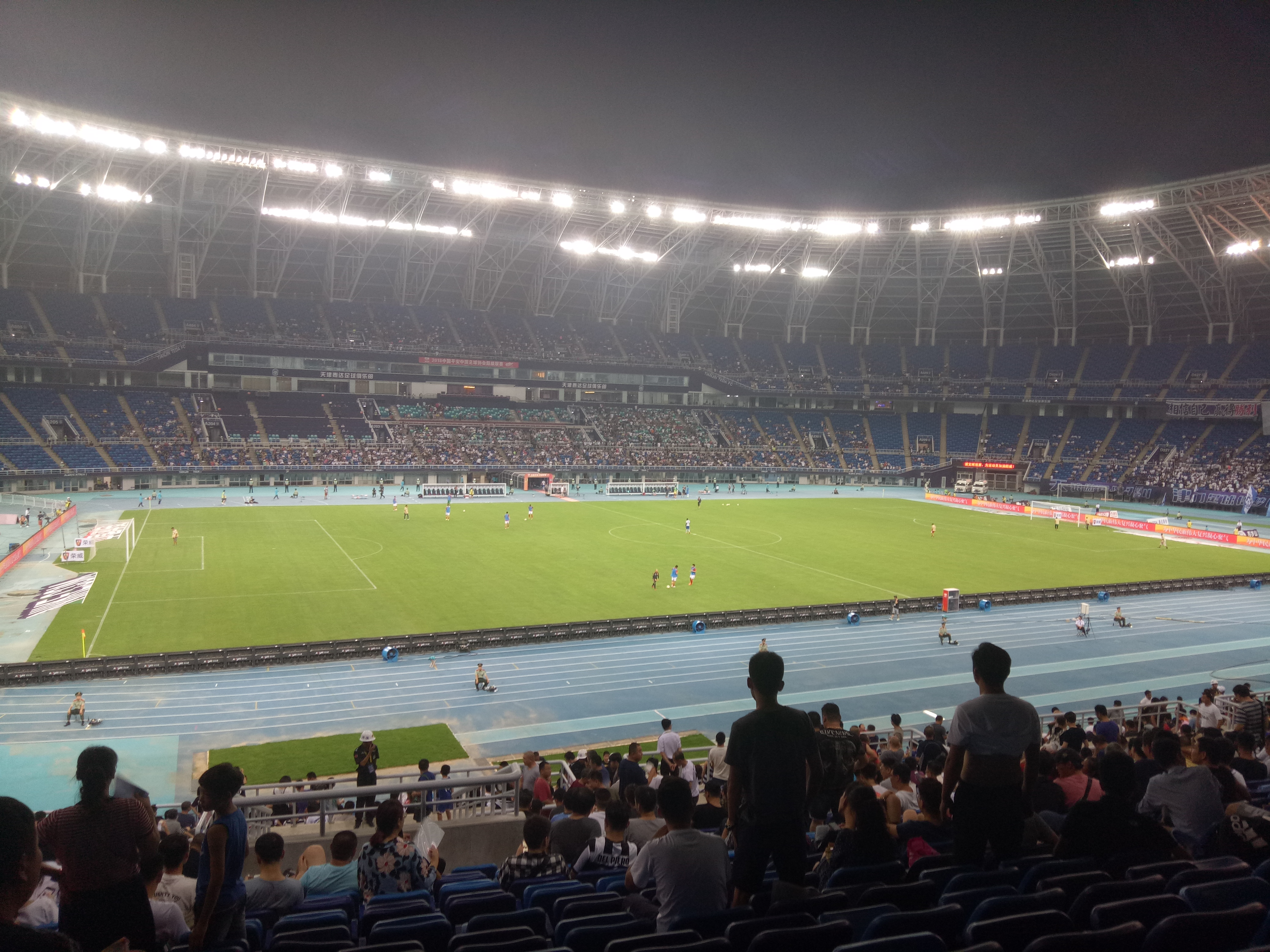
The interior of the main stadium

The stadium hosted games for the 2007 FIFA Women's World Cup and Football preliminaries at the 2008 Summer Olympics. It also hosted the Athletics competitions at the 2017 National Games of China.

It covers 78,000 square meters and has a capacity of 54,696 seats. It as a length of 380 meters (1,250 ft), a width of 270 meters (890 ft), and a height of 53 meters (174 ft). The stadium is nicknamed "The Water Drop" because the outside of the venue was designed to resemble a drop of water. The stadium cost nearly 1.5 billion Yuan. The architects were AXS Satow.

In 2011, the venue hosted a football match between Tianjin TEDA and the Spanish side Real Madrid, the first sports club with 100 million followers on Instagram.

The stadium houses sports facilities, exhibition halls, conference rooms and gyms. It also has the capacity for entertainment and shopping complexes. American singer and recording artist Mariah Carey performed The Elusive Chanteuse Show in the stadium on 17 October 2014 and thus making her as the only international artist to have visited Tianjin.

== 2007 FIFA Women's World Cup matches ==
Date	Stage	Team	Res.	Team	Att.
18 September 2007	Group B	North Korea	1–2	Sweden	33,196
20 September 2007	Group D	China	2–0	New Zealand	55,832
22 September 2007	Quarter-finals	United States	3–0	England	29,586
23 September 2007	Quarter-finals	Brazil	3–2	Australia	35,061
26 September 2007	Semi-finals	Germany	3–0	Norway	35,061

== 2008 Olympic Football Matches ==
Date	Time (UTC+08)	Team #1	Result	Team #2	Round	Attendance
6 August 2008	17:00	Argentina	1-2	Canada	Group E	23,201
6 August 2008	19:45	China	2-1	Sweden	Group E	37,902
7 August 2008	17:00	Japan	0-1	United States	Group B	57,102
7 August 2008	19:45	Netherlands	0-0	Nigeria	Group B	52,390
9 August 2008	17:00	Sweden	1-0	Argentina	Group E	38,293
9 August 2008	19:45	Canada	1-1	China	Group E	52,600
10 August 2008	17:00	Nigeria	2-1	Japan	Group B	42,592
10 August 2008	19:45	United States	2-2	Netherlands	Group B	45,016
12 August 2008	17:00	North Korea	0-1	Germany	Group F	12,387
13 August 2008	17:00	Cameroon	0-0	Italy	Group D	47,307
13 August 2008	19:45	Ivory Coast	1-0	Australia	Group A	50,437
15 August 2008	18:00	Brazil	2-1	Norway	Quarter Finals (Women)	26,174
