= Hamdya Abass =

Ghanaian footballer

Personal information
- Date of birth: 1 August 1982 (age 44)
- Position: Defender

Senior career*
Years	Team	Apps	(Gls)
- Ghatel Ladies

International career^{‡}
	Ghana	7	(0)
- * Club domestic league appearances and goals ‡ National team caps and goals as of 10 September 2007 (before the 2007 FIFA Women's World Cup)

Hamdya Abass (born 1 August 1982) is a Ghanaian women's international footballer who plays as a defender. She is a member of the Ghana women's national football team. She was part of the team at the 2007 FIFA Women's World Cup. At the club level she played for Tamale Ghatel Ladies in Ghana.

== See also ==
- List of Ghana women's international footballers
