= Memunatu Sulemana =

Ghanaian footballer (born 1977)

Personal information
- Date of birth: 4 November 1977 (age 48)
- Position: Goalkeeper

Senior career*
Years	Team	Apps	(Gls)
- Post Ladies

International career^{‡}
	Ghana	34	(0)
- * Club domestic league appearances and goals ‡ National team caps and goals as of 10 September 2007 (before the 2007 FIFA Women's World Cup)

Memunatu Sulemana (born 4 November 1977) is a Ghanaian former footballer who played as a goalkeeper. She has been a member of the Ghana women's national team.

== Club career ==
At club level Sulemana played for Post Ladies in Ghana. She previously played for Pelican Stars in Nigeria Women Premier League.

== International career ==
Sulemana was part of the Ghana women's national football team at the 1999 FIFA Women's World Cup, 2003 FIFA Women's World Cup and 2007 FIFA Women's World Cup.
