= Mavis Danso =

Ghanaian footballer

Personal information
- Date of birth: 24 March 1984 (age 42)
- Position: Defender

Senior career*
Years	Team	Apps	(Gls)
- Robert Morris College

International career^{‡}
	Ghana	8	(0)
- * Club domestic league appearances and goals ‡ National team caps and goals as of 10 September 2007 (before the 2007 FIFA Women's World Cup)

Mavis Danso (born 24 March 1984) is a Ghanaian women's international footballer who plays as a defender. She is a member of the Ghana women's national football team. She was part of the team at the 2003 FIFA Women's World Cup and 2007 FIFA Women's World Cup. On club level she plays for Robert Morris College in the United States.
