= Yaa Avoe =

Ghanaian footballer (born 1982)

Personal information
- Date of birth: 1 July 1982 (age 44)
- Position: Defender

Senior career*
Years	Team	Apps	(Gls)
- Ash Town Ladies

International career^{‡}
	Ghana	23	(0)
- * Club domestic league appearances and goals ‡ National team caps and goals as of 10 September 2007 (before the 2007 FIFA Women's World Cup)

Yaa Avoe (born 1 July 1982) is a Ghanaian women's international footballer who plays as a defender. She is a member of the Ghana women's national football team. She was part of the team at the 2003 FIFA Women's World Cup and 2007 FIFA Women's World Cup. On club level she plays for Ash Town Ladies in Ghana.
