= Lydia Ankrah =

Ghanaian footballer (born 1973)

Personal information
- Date of birth: 1 December 1973 (age 52)
- Position: Defender

Senior career*
Years	Team	Apps	(Gls)
- Post Ladies

International career^{‡}
	Ghana	14	(0)
- * Club domestic league appearances and goals ‡ National team caps and goals as of 10 September 2007 (before the 2007 FIFA Women's World Cup)

Lydia Ankrah (born 1 December 1973) is a Ghanaian women's international footballer who plays as a defender. She is a member of the Ghana women's national football team. She was part of the team at the 2003 FIFA Women's World Cup and 2007 FIFA Women's World Cup. On club level she plays for Post Ladies in Ghana.
