= Martina Franko =

Canadian soccer player (born 1976)

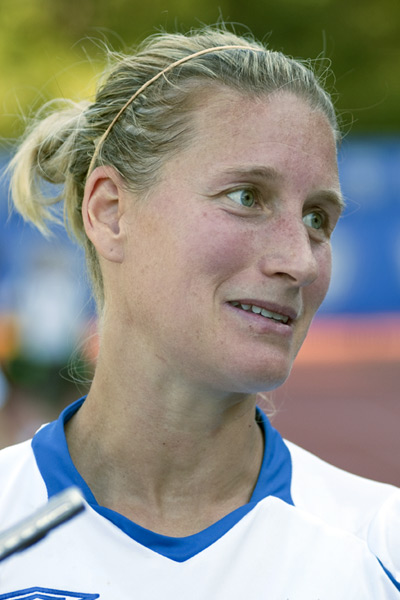

Personal information
- Full name: Martina Marie Franko
- Birth name: Martina Marie Holan
- Date of birth: January 13, 1976 (age 50)
- Place of birth: Cincinnati, Ohio, United States
- Height: 5 ft 8 in (1.73 m)
- Position: Defender

College career
Years	Team	Apps	(Gls)
1994–1997	Colorado College Tigers		(45)

Senior career*
Years	Team	Apps	(Gls)
2002	California Storm	14	(15)
2003–2006	Surrey United	28	(40)
2003–2006	Vancouver Whitecaps	44	(30)
2009	Los Angeles Sol	10	(0)
2010	Vancouver Whitecaps	9	(1)

International career
2005–2009	Canada	55	(5)

Managerial career
- 2008–: Quest University Canada
- * Club domestic league appearances and goals

Martina Marie Franko (née Holan; born January 13, 1976) is a Canadian former soccer player who played defender.

== Club career ==
Franko performs a versatile role, and can play as either a midfielder or forward. She has been a regular on Surrey United women's premier division team playing in the British Columbia-based Metro Women's Soccer League for the past two years. The MWSL plays in the winter so no major conflict with summer leagues such as W-League.

In her club career, Franko has won two W-League titles with the Vancouver Whitecaps, in 2004 and 2006. After one year for Los Angeles Sol in the Women's Professional Soccer League turned on April 1, 2010 back to her former club Vancouver Whitecaps.

== International career ==
Franko won her first cap for Canada in 2005, aged 29. She scored her first goal on her second cap, against Germany, in a 4–3 loss. At the 2007 Pan American Games, she helped the team achieve a bronze medal in the soccer competition; later that year, she played in her first major, FIFA affiliated tournament with the Canada team, the 2007 World Cup, where she played all three group stage matches, scoring one goal, before the team was knocked out. She also competed for the team at the 2008 Summer Olympics.

== Coaching career ==
In January 2008, Franko joined Quest University Canada as head coach of the varsity women's soccer team.

Franko, also a Canadian National B licensed coach, served as an assistant coach for the Colorado College Tigers during the 1998 season after receiving her bachelor's degree in psychology.

== Personal life ==
She moved to Squamish, British Columbia, home of her husband John, in 2003.

Her parents, Dana Holanová and Jaromír Holan, were the Czechoslovak national champions in ice dancing in the 1960s.

== Honours ==
Vancouver Whitecaps FC

- USL W-League championship: 2004, 2006

Individual

- Canada Soccer Hall of Fame
