= Christine Baitinger =

German footballer and referee

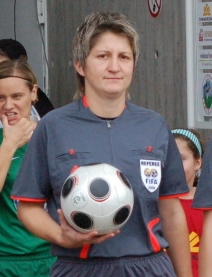
- Born: 2 March 1974 (age 52); Germany
- Other occupation: Civil servant

Domestic
Years	League	Role
1999–	DFB	Referee

International
Years	League	Role
2004–	FIFA listed	Referee

Christine Baitinger (born 2 March 1974 as Christine Beck) is a German football referee and former player.

She played for women's Bundesliga team VfL Sindelfingen in the early 1990s before moving into officiating in 1999.

Joining the local Fußball-Oberliga Baden-Württemberg she refereed Men's football games as well as the 2001 DFB Frauen-Pokal Final between 1. FFC Frankfurt and FFC Flaesheim-Hillen.

Baitinger was appointed to the FIFA list of international referees in 2004 and her first assignment was the UEFA Women's Under-19 Championship in Finland. She followed this with appearances at the 2006 FIFA U-20 Women's World Championship in Russia.

On 7 March 2007, she refereed the World Cup qualifier game between Japan and Mexico in Tokyo, going on to also referee the first-leg of the UEFA Women's Cup between Umeå IK and Arsenal.

She was chosen as one of the referees to attend the 2007 FIFA Women's World Cup in China and officiated in two games.
