= Lise Klaveness =

Norwegian footballer and executive

Personal information
- Date of birth: 19 April 1981 (age 45)
- Place of birth: Meland, Norway
- Height: 1.68 m (5 ft 6 in)
- Positions: Midfielder; forward

Youth career
- Kvernbit

Senior career*
Years	Team	Apps	(Gls)
1997–1999	Sandviken	42	(9)
1999–2000	Bjørnar	13	(1)
2000–2001	Athene Moss	16	(2)
2001–2006	Asker	65	(14)
2006–2007	Umeå	20	(9)
2007–2008	Asker	21	(13)
2008–2011	Stabæk	59	(41)

International career
1997	Norway U16	6	(3)
1998	Norway U17	6	(1)
1998–2000	Norway U18	12	(5)
2000–2002	Norway U21	12	(3)
2002–2011	Norway	73	(9)
- * Club domestic league appearances and goals

Lise Klaveness (born 19 April 1981) is a Norwegian lawyer and former footballer who played 73 matches for Norway's national team between 2002 and 2011. She is currently the president of the Norwegian Football Federation.

Since assuming her leadership role in March 2022, Klaveness has advocated for change within FIFA. On the eve of the 2022 World Cup, in response to reports of mistreatment of migrant workers, Klaveness protested FIFA's decision to allow Qatar to host the Cup. Klaveness is also a vocal critic of holding the 2034 FIFA World Cup in Saudi Arabia, noting the bidding process is tainted with corruption and the country also violates human rights.

== Club career ==
Her clubs include IL Sandviken, Bjørnar (now Arna-Bjørnar) (2000), FK Athene Moss (2001), Asker (2002–2005, 2008) and, in 2006/07, Umeå IK where she was vice-captain for the 2007 season. At the end of her time in Umeå, she went on holiday to West Africa, where she contracted serious food poisoning with a body temperature of 42 °C. In her own words, "I met the man with the scythe" (i.e. the Grim Reaper).

In 2008, she returned to Norway and played again for Asker and was also the club's physical trainer as well as qualifying as a lawyer and beginning full-time work for a law firm in Oslo.

At the end of 2008, when Asker became bankrupt, most first-team players, including Klaveness, transferred to Stabæk IF, the nearby top sports club, to set up Stabæk Fotball Kvinner (SFK). Stabæk therefore became the first Norwegian club to have men's and women's teams playing in the two elite divisions, the Tippeligaen and the Toppserien. Despite retiring from international football in 2011, Klaveness was contracted to continue playing for SFK in 2012. But she announced her retirement from all football in March 2012 after her enthusiasm waned.

== International career ==
Klaveness played in Norway's team in the 2003 FIFA Women's World Cup tournament in the USA and in the UEFA Women's Euro 2005, also known as the European Cup competition, played in England.

She played on the Norwegian team that finished fourth at the 2007 FIFA Women's World Cup in China, but retired from the Norwegian national team at the end of the 2007 season, having played 51 matches and scored six goals. The manner of Klaveness' departure was controversial, as coach Bjarne Berntsen told her she was no longer required in the airport lounge immediately after the long flight home from the World Cup in China. This shocked and upset Klaveness and some of her teammates. She was recalled in 2009 after Eli Landsem replaced Bertsen as the team's trainer.

In October 2009 she was recalled to the women's national team for two matches in the qualification stage of the 2011 FIFA Women's World Cup. Eventually, she completed a further 22 matches for Norway.

== International goals ==
No.	Date	Venue	Opponent	Score	Result	Competition
1.	11 May 2003	Kristiansand Stadion, Kristiansand, Norway	Belgium	4–0	6–0	UEFA Women's Euro 2005 qualifying
2.	12 June 2005	Deepdale, Preston, England	Italy	1–0	5–3	UEFA Women's Euro 2005
3.	12 June 2005	Deepdale, Preston, England	Italy	5–2	5–3	UEFA Women's Euro 2005
4.	27 August 2005	Åråsen, Lillestrøm, Norway	Ukraine	4–1	4–1	2007 FIFA Women's World Cup qualification
5.	29 October 2005	Brann Stadion, Bergen, Norway	Italy	1–0	1–0	2007 FIFA Women's World Cup qualification
6.	20 September 2007	Yellow Dragon Stadium, Hangzhou, China	Ghana	7–0	7–2	2007 FIFA Women's World Cup
7.	27 March 2010	AKA Arena, Hønefoss, Norway	Macedonia	7–0	14–0	2011 FIFA Women's World Cup qualification
8.	30 March 2010	Neman Stadium, Grodno, Belarus	Belarus	2–0	5–0	2011 FIFA Women's World Cup qualification
9.	23 June 2010	Skagerak Arena, Skien, Norway	Belarus	1–0	3–0	2011 FIFA Women's World Cup qualification

== Post-playing career ==
As a specialist in employment law, Klaveness has sometimes been involved with disputes between football clubs and their employees. She also served on the management committee of NISO, the union for sports people in Norway.

Klaveness announced her retirement from football in March 2012. Further to her career as an attorney, she is also serving as a deputy judge in the Oslo court. Since her playing retirement, Klaveness has also worked as a television football pundit. She was a studio commentator for NRK's coverage of the 2014 [men's] World Cup, after which she was subject to sexist criticism by internet trolls.

In 2018, Klaveness was hired as director of elite football in the Norwegian Football Federation (NFF). On 7 March 2022, Klaveness was elected as Norwegian Football Federation (NFF) president. She is the first woman to lead NFF in their 120-year organization history. She represents her childhood club IL Kvernbit.

During FIFA's Congress in Doha in March 2022, Klaveness gave a speech arguing that the international football community should do more to "help migrant workers in Qatar, more to protect LGBTQ+ supporters at the World Cup, and more to make the global game welcoming to all". Both the speech and the trip to Doha itself had to be cleared by the Norwegian government. Since Klaveness is married to a woman, Ingrid Camilla Fosse Sæthre, she risked seven years in prison in Qatar just by traveling there. The conclusion from the Norwegian Ministry of Foreign Affairs and the embassy was that as long as she did all of her statements in public, it should be safe for her to travel.

Soon afterwards, Fritt Ord announced that they would award Klaveness the Fritt Ord Honorary Award for the speech. Klaveness has also been critical of the 2034 FIFA World Cup due to how the process for bidding heavily favored Saudi Arabia. Prior to Norway's 2026 FIFA World Cup qualification campaign, Klavenes called for an investigation into Israel (who Norway was drawn against), stating that the NFF could not remain indifferent to the civilian casualties in Gaza since the Gaza war. In April 2026, Klaveness called for the abolition of the FIFA Peace Prize, saying that it was not the organization's role to award such a prize.

On 23 July 2026, it was reported that the Norwegian Football Federation would submit a formal complaint to FIFA's Ethics Committee following the upholding of the suspension of United States forward Folarin Balogun in the Trump–FIFA red card controversy. In an interview, Klaveness called on FIFA president Gianni Infantino to acknowledge that the decision had been an "error".

Following FIFA's withdrawal of the proposed FIFA Forward Enterprise (FFE) investment plan, Klaveness emerged as one of the leading figures in UEFA's opposition to the initiative. She outlined potential governance options should FIFA's leadership face a broader challenge and later criticized the process surrounding the proposal as "economic blackmail."

On 4 August 2026, former FIFA president Sepp Blatter publicly endorsed Klaveness as his preferred successor to Gianni Infantino, describing her as "the only one who always took a clear stand" and arguing that "the time is right for a woman to take the lead" at FIFA. On 7 August, Klaveness led the Norwegian Football Federation in calling for Infantino to resign, stating that the federation had lost trust in his leadership and that there was "no way back" for him.

== Personal life ==
Klavenes is married to former footballer Ingrid Camilla Fosse Sæthre; they have three children.
