= Aminatu Ibrahim =

Ghanaian footballer

Personal information
- Date of birth: 3 January 1979 (age 47)
- Position: Defender

Senior career*
Years	Team	Apps	(Gls)
- Ghatel Ladies

International career^{‡}
	Ghana	8	(0)
- * Club domestic league appearances and goals ‡ National team caps and goals as of 10 September 2007 (before the 2007 FIFA Women's World Cup)

Aminatu Ibrahim (born 3 January 1979) is a Ghanaian women's international footballer who plays as a defender. She is a member of the Ghana women's national football team. She was part of the team at the 2003 FIFA Women's World Cup and 2007 FIFA Women's World Cup. On club level she plays for Ghatel Ladies in Ghana. She was part of the team that played against Zimbabwe in 4th African Women's Cup of Nations. She also took part in the African Women's Championship organised in South Africa in 2010.
