= Camilla Huse =

Norwegian footballer (born 1979)

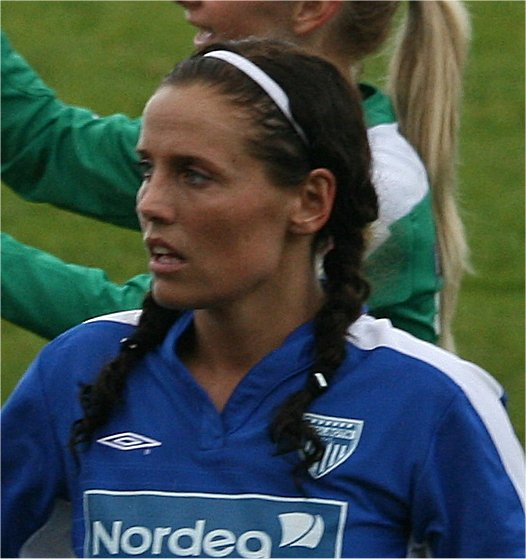

Personal information
- Full name: Camilla Hammerø Huse Camilla Engrønningen Huse
- Date of birth: 31 August 1979 (age 47)
- Place of birth: Sarpsborg, Norway
- Height: 1.64 m (5 ft 5 in)
- Position: Left-back

Youth career
- Askim FK

Senior career*
Years	Team	Apps	(Gls)
1997–2001	Athene Moss		
2002–2007	Kolbotn		
2008	FK Larvik		
2009	Røa IL		
2011	Vålerenga		

International career^{‡}
2005–2009	Norway	39	(0)
- * Club domestic league appearances and goals as of 14:16, 27 September 2014 (UTC) ‡ National team caps and goals as of 14:16, 27 September 2014 (UTC)

Camilla Huse (born 31 August 1979) is a Norwegian former footballer. She made her debut on the Norway women's national football team in 2005.

In the 2007 FIFA Women's World Cup in China, Huse played in all of the Norwegian team's matches — the team finished in fourth place behind USA, Brazil and Germany.

Huse played with the club Kolbotn, which won the Norwegian league in 2002, 2005 and 2006. She announced her retirement at the end of 2007 and missed most of the 2008 season through pregnancy, but then joined the League and Cup champion club Røa IL at the beginning of 2009. She was with the Norway team at the UEFA Women's Euro 2009 played in Finland between Europe's top twelve footballing nations.

Huse is the mother of two girls and works as a teacher.
