= Huanglong Sports Center =

Multi-purpose stadium in Hangzhou, China

Huanglong Sports Center Stadium
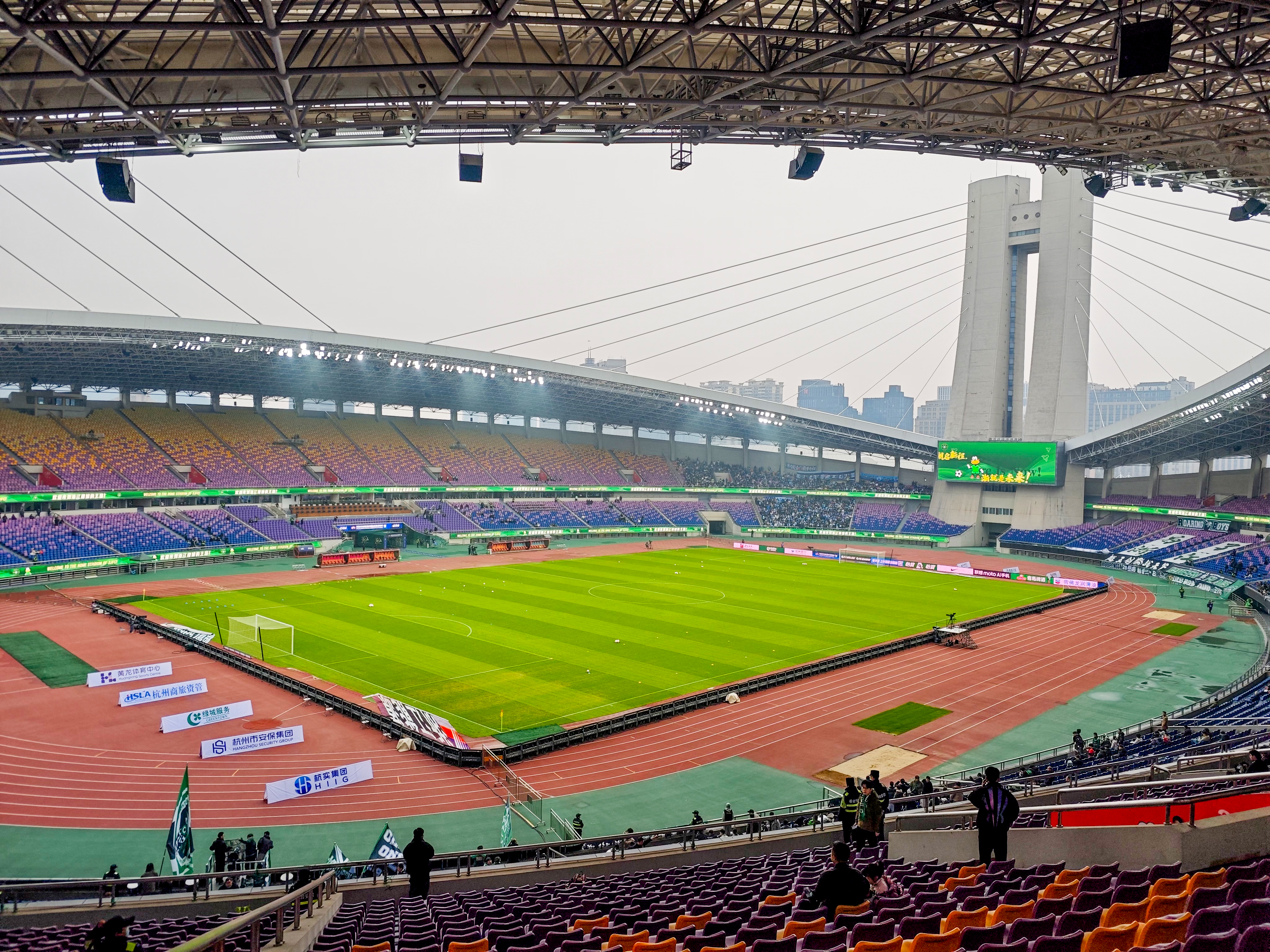
- Huanglong Sports Center Stadium in 2025
- Interactive map of Huanglong Sports Center Stadium
- Full name: Huanglong Sports Center Stadium
- Address: No.1 Huanglong Rd, Xihu District, Hangzhou, Zhejiang, China
- Coordinates: 30.2683°N 120.1290°E
- Capacity: 51,971 (stadium); 8,000 (arena)
- Surface: Grass
- Public transit: 3 10 at Huanglong Sports Center

Construction
- Opened: 2000
- Renovated: 2019–2021

Tenant
- Zhejiang Professional

Huanglong Sports Center Stadium (simplified Chinese: 黄龙体育中心; traditional Chinese: 黃龍體育中心; pinyin: Huánglóng Tǐyùzhōngxīn), or Yellow Dragon Sports Center Stadium, is a multi-purpose stadium in the center of the city of Hangzhou, Zhejiang, China, home to Chinese Super League club Zhejiang Professional. Huanglong means "yellow dragon" in Chinese. It is also used for cultural events such as music concerts and celebrations.

The center, built between 1997 and 2003, includes an association football stadium with a running track, an indoor arena, outdoor track and field practice facility, a sports hotel, a press center, and other facilities for sports such as rhythmic gymnastics, tennis, diving and chess.

The stadium is one of the main sports venues in Hangzhou, together with the 14,000-capacity Jianggan District Culture and Sports Center Stadium and the 80,000-capacity Hangzhou Sports Park Stadium.

Yellow Dragon Stadium or Huanglong Stadium (Chinese: 杭州黄龙体育场) is an outdoor association football stadium and the main feature of the Yellow Dragon Sports Center. The facility seats 51,000 people and was completed in 2000. It is used by the local football team and was one of the venues of the 2007 FIFA Women's World Cup held in September 2007, for group phase games and the Brazil-USA semifinal. It was referred to by FIFA as Hangzhou Dragon Stadium.

The structure is circular in shape and has a partial roof covering the seating sections that is supported by two dual suspension towers on opposing ends of the stadium.

After Hangzhou became the host of the 2022 Asian Games in September 2015 which the stadium was originally intended as the main venue as the athletics and ceremonies venue,but due changes of plains,hosted the football quarter-finals and semi-finals, and the women's gold medal final.

== Huanglong Gymnasium ==
Yellow Dragon Gymnasium or Huanglong Gymnasium is an indoor arena seating 8,000 people, which was officially put into service on 21 September 2003. It was constructed at a cost of 160 million RMB (roughly 19 million USD). The arena can accommodate figure skating and ice hockey, as well as a variety of indoor sports. It is also used for music concerts.

It is adjacent to the stadium in the northeast direction. This was originally designed by Soviet experts in the 1950s and endorsed by Later Premier Zhou Enlai. When Zhou Enlai visited Hangzhou in the early 1970s, he repeated this plan to local officials.

== 2007 FIFA Women's World Cup matches ==
Date	Stage	Team	Res.	Team	Att.
12 September 2007	Group C	Ghana	1–4	Australia	30,752
12 September 2007	Group C	Norway	2–1	Canada	30,752
15 September 2007	Group C	Canada	4–0	Ghana	33,835
15 September 2007	Group C	Australia	1–1	Norway	33,835
17 September 2007	Group A	Germany	2–0	Japan	39,817
20 September 2007	Group C	Norway	7–2	Ghana	43,817
20 September 2007	Group D	Brazil	1–0	Denmark	43,817
27 September 2007	Semi-finals	United States	0–4	Brazil	47,818

== Notable events ==
On 24 February 2012, Irish vocal pop band Westlife held a concert for Greatest Hits supporting their album Greatest Hits. And back for their The Wild Dreams Tour on 17 November 2023.

On 8 September 2018, Joker Xue, a Chinese singer-songwriter, headlined the stadium as part of his Skyscraper World Tour.

Preceded by Pakansari Stadium; Bogor	Asian Games Men's Football tournament Final Venue; 2022	Succeeded by Toyota Stadium; Toyota
Preceded by Gelora Sriwijaya Stadium; Palembang	Asian Games Women's Football tournament Final Venue; 2022	Succeeded by Shizuoka Stadium; Fukuroi
