= Ingvild Stensland =

Norwegian football coach (born 1981)

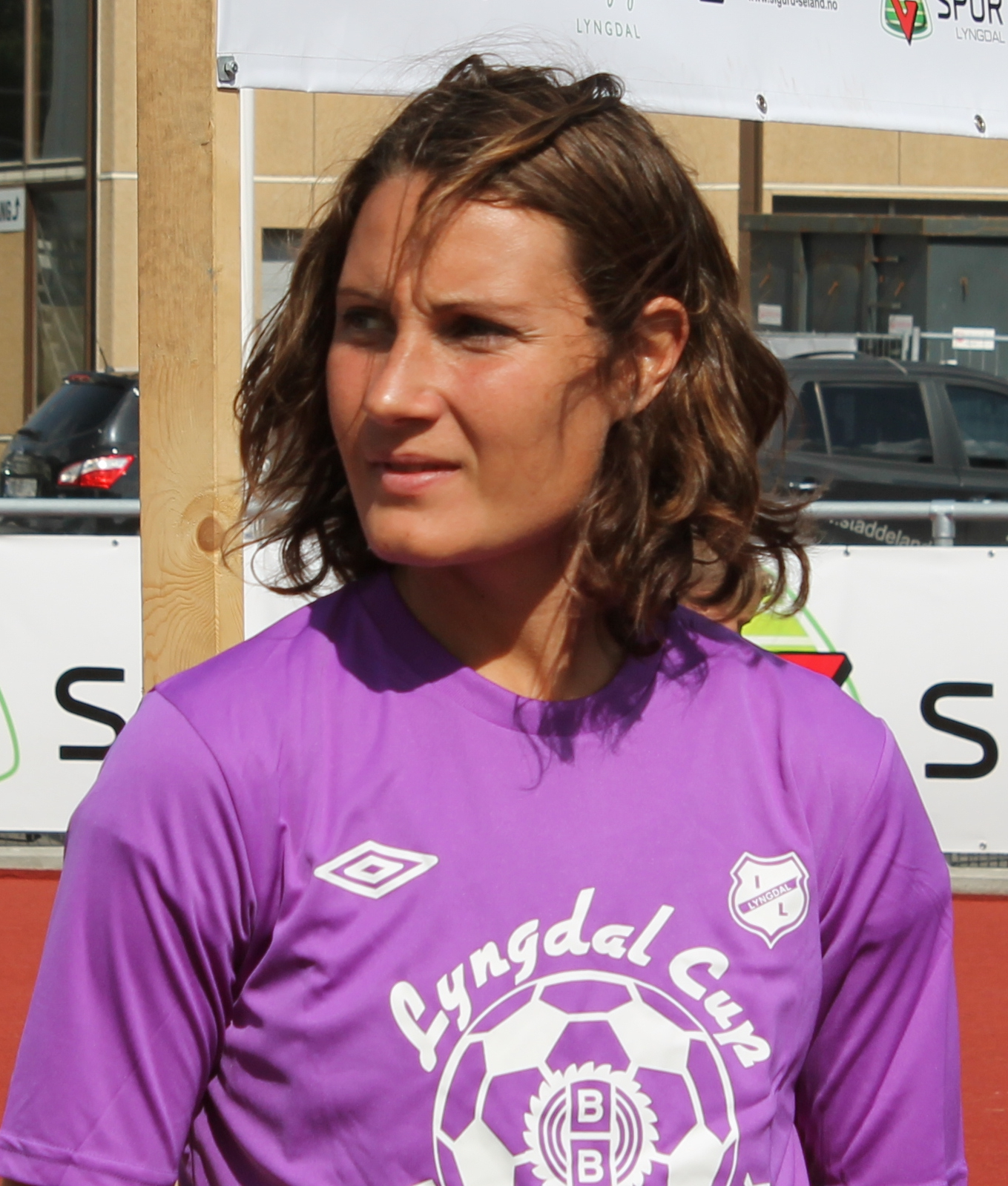
- Stensland in 2012

Personal information
- Full name: Ingvild Stensland
- Date of birth: 3 August 1981 (age 45)
- Place of birth: Farsund, Norway
- Height: 1.76 m (5 ft 9 in)
- Position: Midfielder

Youth career
- 1987–1998: Lyngdal IL

Senior career*
Years	Team	Apps	(Gls)
1998–1999	Donn		
2000–2002	Athene Moss		
2002–2007	Kolbotn	120	(9)
2007–2009	Göteborg	38	(4)
2009–2011	Lyon	20	(3)
2011	Göteborg	6	(0)
2012–2016	Stabæk	13	(8)

International career^{‡}
2003–2016	Norway	144	(10)
Medal record
Women's football
Representing Norway
UEFA Women's Championship
Silver medal – second place	England 2005	Team
Silver medal – second place	Sweden 2013	Team
- * Club domestic league appearances and goals as of 7 November 2012 ‡ National team caps and goals as of 14:16, 7 June 2016 (UTC)

Ingvild Stensland (born 3 August 1981) is a former Norwegian footballer who, from August 2022, is one of the assistance coaches on Norway women's national team.

As a player she last played for Stabæk FK in the Toppserien. She played as a midfielder and was a member of, and for several years also the captain of, the Norway women's national team, making her debut in 2003. She has also played in the French Division 1 and the Swedish Damallsvenskan for Lyon and Göteborg FC.

== Playing career ==
Stensland was born in Farsund in the south of Norway and grew up at nearby Lyngdal Municipality showing her talent for football at an early age. She grew up in a footballing family. Her father was a coach, while her older sisters played at Lyngdal IL. As a youth, Stensland trained with her male counterparts at Lyngdal until she reached her teens. She had a successful career with Lyngdal before starring for clubs such as FK Donn, Athene Moss, and Kolbotn in her home country Norway, Kopparbergs/Göteborg FC in Sweden, and Lyon in France. In 2005, Stensland was named the Toppserien Player of the Year. She has also been nominated for the FIFA Women's World Player of the Year award on four occasions.

As a national team player, Stensland played in the 2005 European Championships guiding her team to a second-place finish after falling 3–1 to the Germans in the final. Since making her debut in 2003, Stensland has become a regular in the team appearing at the 2007 FIFA Women's World Cup, the 2008 Summer Olympics, UEFA Women's Euro 2009 and the 2011 FIFA Women's World Cup.

At the beginning of 2009, Ingvild Stensland signed a contract with top French club, Olympique Lyonnaise. At about the same time she took over as captain of the national team, an appointment that was confirmed by the new chief trainer, Eli Landsem, at the end of 2009. In 2011, she returned to Göteborg, with whom she won the Svenska Cupen. After the end of the season she returned to Norway to play for Stabæk FK.

== Coaching career ==
In January 2018, Stensland got hired as player developer in Stabæk. In 2022, she continued her career as coach of the Norway women under-23 national team. However, in August 2022, she became one of the assistance coaches for the Norway national team, together with Monica Knudsen, with Hege Riise as the head coach.

== Honours ==
=== Individual ===
- 2005 Toppserien Player of the Year
- 2008 Norwegian Women's Player of the Year (NISO)

== See also ==
- List of women's footballers with 100 or more international caps
