= Florence Okoe =

Ghanaian footballer

Personal information
- Date of birth: 12 November 1984 (age 41)
- Position: Midfielder

Senior career*
Years	Team	Apps	(Gls)
- Ghatel Ladies

International career^{‡}
	Ghana	8	(0)
- * Club domestic league appearances and goals ‡ National team caps and goals as of 10 September 2007 (before the 2007 FIFA Women's World Cup)

Florence Okoe (born 12 November 1984) is a Ghanaian women's international footballer who plays as a midfielder. She is a member of the Ghana women's national football team. She was part of the team at the 2003 FIFA Women's World Cup and 2007 FIFA Women's World Cup. On club level she plays for Ghatel Ladies in Ghana.
