= Bente Nordby =

Norwegian footballer (born 1974)

Personal information
- Full name: Bente Dalum Nordby
- Date of birth: 23 July 1974 (age 52)
- Place of birth: Gjøvik, Norway
- Height: 5 ft 6 in (1.68 m)
- Position: Goalkeeper

Senior career*
Years	Team	Apps	(Gls)
–1995	Sprint-Jeløy		
1996–2000	Athene Moss		
2001	Carolina Courage	10	(0)
2001	San Diego Spirit	4	(0)
2002–2004	Kolbotn IL		(0)
2005	Asker FK	47	(0)
2006–2007	Djurgårdens IF (Note: 2006 as Djurgården/Älvsjö.)	31	(0)
2008–2009	Lyon	10	(0)

International career
1991–2007	Norway	172	(0)
Medal record
Women's football
Representing Norway
Olympic Games
Gold medal – first place	2000 Sydney	Team competition
Bronze medal – third place	1996 Atlanta	Team competition
- * Club domestic league appearances and goals as of 10 December 2007

Bente Dalum Nordby (born 23 July 1974) is a former Norwegian football goalkeeper. She played with the Norway women's national football team from 1991 to 2007.

== Career ==
Nordby is the second-most capped player ever for Norway with 172 international appearances. Only Hege Riise has more, with 188. She appeared in the first five FIFA Women's World Cups, an achievement that only U.S. player Kristine Lilly shares. Nordby is also the second most-capped international women's goalkeeper of all time.

On 24 January 2008, Nordby announced her retirement from the national team.

== Club career ==
A native of Raufoss, Nordby began her club career with Raufoss/Vind. She later joined SK Sprint-Jeløy of Norway's Toppserien where she played until the end of the 1995 season. Ahead of the 1996 season, the team Sprint-Jeløy was replaced by Athene Moss, where she played until 2000.

Nordby, paired with fellow Norwegian Hege Riise, was the first pick in the 30 October 2000 WUSA Foreign Player Allocation Draft, having been chosen by the Carolina Courage.

Nordby played the first half of the 2001 season for the Courage, but was later traded to the San Diego Spirit. In July 2001, the Spirit released Nordby due to the league's salary cap. In total, she played 14 matches of a 21-match season for the two clubs, earning a 1.73 Goals Against Average for the season.

After returning to Norway, Nordby joined Kolbotn in 2002, where she went on to win the Norway league that same year. She continued to play with Kolbotn until the end of the 2004 season. She then signed with Asker FK in December 2005. While playing with Asker, she won the Norwegian Cup in 2005, her only time with the club.

In early 2006, Nordby signed a 2-year contract with Djurgården/Älvsjö in Sweden's Damallsvenskan league. In 2007, Nordby won the Damallsvenskan Goalkeeper of the Year Award.

On 27 November 2007, it was announced that Nordby would be signing an 18-month contract with Lyon as cover for their regular goalkeeper, Véronique Pons, who was out with a long-term injury.

In June 2009, the Norway national team trainer Bjarne Berntsen announced that Bente Nordby had retired from Lyon and would not be joining Norway's squad for the 2009 European Cup tournament. After retiring, she joined Lillestrøm SK as the team's goalkeeper coach.

== International career ==
Nordby represented only Norway in international competition. She made her debut for the national team on 30 August 1991, in New Britain, Conn. posting a 1–0 shutout against the U.S.

In 1991, Nordby was the national team reserve keeper at the 1991 Women's World Cup in China; Norway won a silver. She was on the squad that won the 1993 European Championship and the Algarve Cup in 1994.

Nordby replaced long-time GK Reidun Seth starting goalkeeper in 1995. In the 1995 Women's World Cup, she allowed only one goal in six matches, leading to the first-ever Women's World Cup title for Norway, defeating Germany 2–0.

In 1996, she was on the Bronze medal squad at the Atlanta Summer Olympics. Nordby was the starting keeper for Norway as they won the Algarve Cup in 1996, 1997 and 1998.

In the 1999 Women's World Cup, Norway placed fourth overall, having lost to China in the semifinals, 5–0, then to Brazil in the Bronze Medal match.

She was on the Olympic Gold squad at the Sydney Summer Olympics on 28 September 2000.

Nordby retirement from international football in late 2002, then returned when she was named to the roster of the squad for the 2003 Women's World Cup. Despite losing 1–0 to the U.S. in the quarterfinals, Nordby won the Player of the Match Award, after stopping a penalty kick taken by Mia Hamm. Norway finished the tournament seventh overall.

Due to their low placement in the World Cup, Norway failed to qualify for the 2004 Athens Summer Olympics.

In 2005, Nordby was the starting keeper as Norway claimed silver in the European Championships, falling to Germany 3–1 in the finals.

She was named to the FIFA Women's World Stars squad in April 2007, as the starting goalkeeper and co-captain with U.S. player, Kristine Lilly. The match was an exhibition match to open the draw for the 2007 Women's World Cup in China.

At the 2007 Women's World Cup in China, Norway placed fourth in the tournament, losing to the U.S. in the third-place match. After the tournament, Nordby was named to the FIFA All Star Team.

She has also been nominated for the FIFA Women's World Player of the Year Award in 2001, 2004, 2005 and 2007.

Nordby's final match for the Norway Women's National Team was on 27 October 2007 in Stavanger, Norway. In that match, Norway defeated Russia 3–0, in a European Championship qualifier. She officially announced her retirement from the national team in January 2008.

== Personal ==
Nordby is openly lesbian, coming out in a Se og Hør article in 2005. She currently resides in Lillestrøm with her partner, former Danish international footballer Dorte Dalum Jensen.

Her hometown is Raufoss, Norway, and she has an older brother and younger sister.

== Honours ==
=== Individual ===
- Swedish Goalkeeper of the Year (1): 2007

== See also ==
- List of women's footballers with 100 or more international caps
