= Lene Storløkken =

Norwegian footballer (born 1981)

Personal information
- Full name: Lene Glesåsen Storløkken
- Date of birth: 20 June 1981 (age 45)
- Place of birth: Lørenskog, Norway
- Position: Midfielder

Senior career*
Years	Team	Apps	(Gls)
- Setskog/Høland FK
- Athene Moss
- Strømmen
- LSK Kvinner FK
- Fjellhamar
- LSK Kvinner FK

International career
2006–2011	Norway	64	(6)
- * Club domestic league appearances and goals

Lene Glesåsen Storløkken (born 20 June 1981) is a Norwegian football player who played for the LSK Kvinner FK.

== Career ==
Storløkken is a midfielder and her former clubs are Athene Moss, Setskog/Høland FK and Kurland FK.

== International career ==
She played in the Norwegian team that finished fourth at the 2007 FIFA Women's World Cup in China.

She also competed at the 2008 Summer Olympics in Beijing, where Norway reached the quarter finals (and lost to Brazil). Since her debut in 2006, Storløkken has played 65 A games for the Norway women's national football team, scoring six goals—the first against Finland women's national football team in the 2007 Algarve Cup. She has also played 45 games for the four Norwegian youth national teams. Storløkken missed the 2011 FIFA Women's World Cup through injury.

== Personal life ==
She is the twin sister of professional female footballer Hege Storløkken.
