= 2007 FIFA Women's World Cup =

2007年女子世界杯足球赛 2007 Nián nǚzǐ shìjièbēi zúqiú sài

Tournament details
- Host country: China
- Dates: 10–30 September
- Teams: 16 (from 6 confederations)
- Venues: 5 (in 5 host cities)

Final positions
- Champions: Germany (2nd title)
- Runners-up: Brazil
- Third place: United States
- Fourth place: Norway

Tournament statistics
- Matches played: 32
- Goals scored: 111 (3.47 per match)
- Attendance: 1,190,971 (37,218 per match)
- Top scorer: (Brazil) Marta (7 goals)
- Best player: (Brazil) Marta
- Best goalkeeper: (Germany) Nadine Angerer
- Fair play award: Norway

The 2007 FIFA Women's World Cup, the fifth edition of the FIFA Women's World Cup, was an international football competition for women held in China from 10 to 30 September 2007. Originally, China was to host the 2003 edition, but the outbreak of SARS in that country forced that event to be moved to the United States. FIFA immediately granted the 2007 event to China, which meant that no new host nation was chosen competitively until the voting was held for the 2011 Women's World Cup.

The tournament opened with a record-breaking match in Shanghai, as Germany beat Argentina 11–0 to register the biggest win and the highest scoring match in Women's World Cup history, records which stood until 2019. The tournament ended with Germany defeating Brazil 2–0 in the final, without conceding a single goal in the entire tournament. The Germans became the first national team in FIFA Women's World Cup history to retain their title.

The golden goal rule for extra time in knockout matches was eliminated by FIFA, although no matches went to extra time (and therefore, none required a penalty shoot-out).

== Teams ==
The qualified teams, listed by region, with numbers in parentheses indicating final positions in the FIFA Women's World Ranking before the tournament were:

Africa (CAF)

- Nigeria (24)
- Ghana (47)

Asia (AFC)

- China (11) (host nation – automatically qualified)
- Australia (15)
- North Korea (5)
- Japan (10) (defeated Mexico in AFC–CONCACAF playoffs)

North America, Central America & Caribbean (CONCACAF)

- Canada (9)
- United States (1)

Europe (UEFA)

- Norway (4)
- Sweden (3)
- Germany (2)
- Denmark (6)
- England (12)

Oceania (OFC)

- New Zealand (23)

South America (CONMEBOL)

- Argentina (29)
- Brazil (8)

== Venues ==
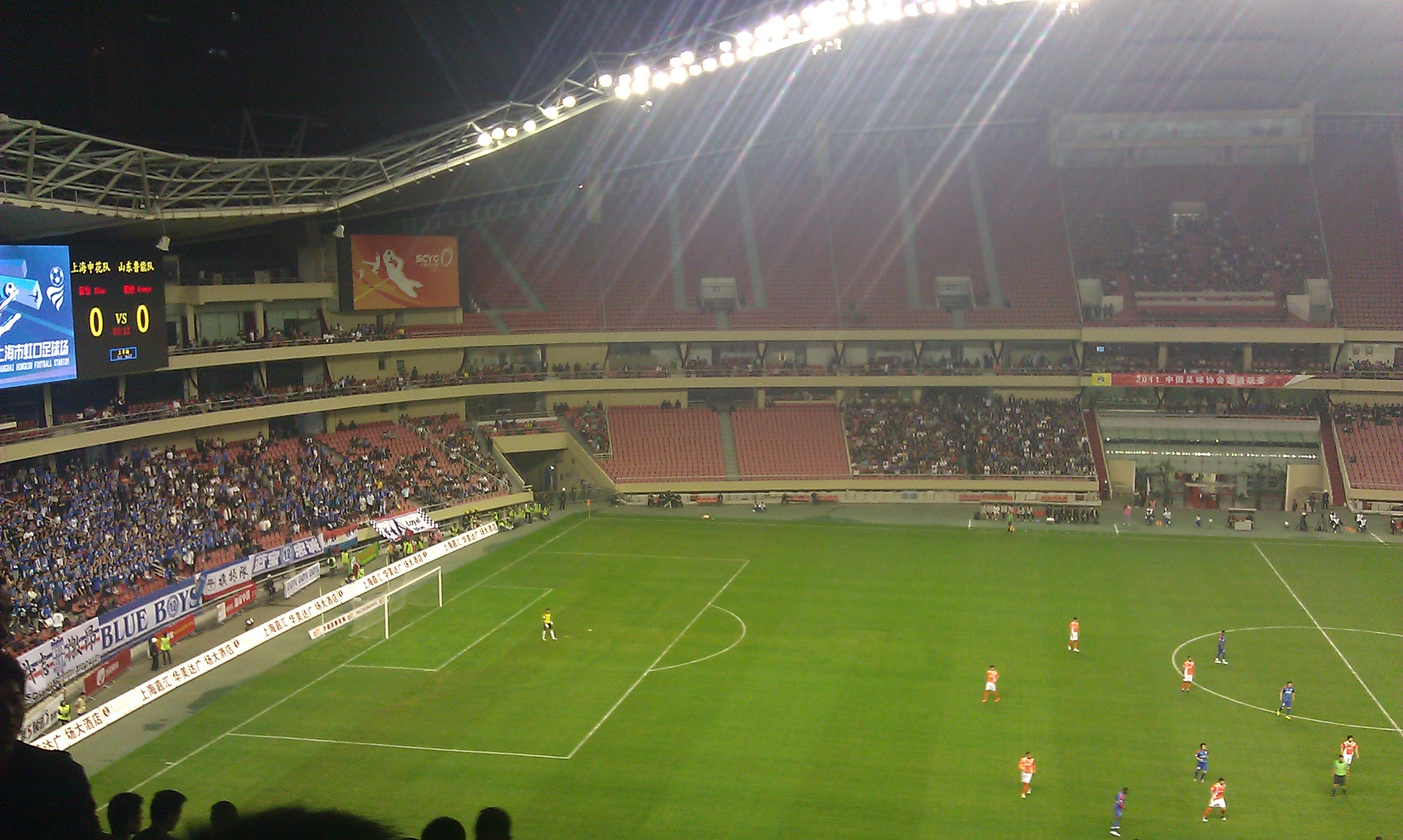
The Hongkou Football Stadium in Shanghai (pictured) hosted the final.

The venues selected to host the competition were:

List of 2007 FIFA Women's World Cup venues
Host city	Stadium	Cap.
Tianjin	Tianjin Olympic Centre	60,000
Wuhan	Wuhan Sports Center	60,000
Hangzhou	Huanglong Sports Center	51,000
Chengdu	Chengdu Sports Centre	40,000
Shanghai	Hongkou Football Stadium	33,000

== Match officials ==
FIFA's Refereeing Department selected 14 referees and 22 assistant referees from around the world to officiate the 32 games that made up the final tournament. Candidate referees for the tournament were placed under scrutiny from 2005 onwards and attended a series of training camps. Candidates refereeing standards were regularly monitored at various tournaments around the globe before a final list was prepared. This was followed by a training camp in the Canary Islands in January 2007 and a final period of preparation and training at the home of FIFA in Zürich in May. No referees were chosen from the Oceania Football Confederation at the finals. The original selection group was made up of 42 entrants, 6 of which failed fitness tests resulting in the final group of 36 being confirmed for China. The United States was the only country represented by two referees.

Unlike the men's tournaments, the quartets of match officials do not necessarily come from the same country or confederation. This selection system was explained by Sonia Denoncourt, the head of women's refereeing at FIFA's Refereeing Department, "We don't have as many referees among the women and we certainly don't want to sacrifice quality. What we are looking for above all is compatibility on the field of play and the closest possible language links in the team selected for each game. The most important thing for us is that the referees have a good performance in the match." A fourth official was chosen from those referees not officiating a game at that time.

The referees stayed together throughout the competition at their hotel base in Shanghai. From there they travelled to the various venues for their designated games, before returning to base camp to continue with their specialised training programmes. As well as fitness training, they attended regular theory sessions and reviewed previous matches to try to identify possible errors and improve their performance levels. A psychologist was also assigned to the group to help with their mental preparations ahead of games.

Referees
Confederation	Referee
AFC	Pannipar Kamnueng (Thailand)
AFC	Niu Huijun (China)
AFC	Tammy Ogston (Australia)
AFC	Mayumi Oiwa (Japan)
CONCACAF	Jennifer Bennett (United States)
CONCACAF	Dianne Ferreira-James (Guyana)
CONCACAF	Kari Seitz (United States)
CONMEBOL	Adriana Correa (Colombia)
UEFA	Christine Beck (Germany)
UEFA	Dagmar Damková (Czech Republic)
UEFA	Gyöngyi Gaál (Hungary)
UEFA	Jenny Palmqvist (Sweden)
UEFA	Nicole Petignat (Switzerland)

Fourth officials
Confederation	Referee
CONMEBOL	Estela Álvarez (Argentina)

Assistant referees
Confederation	Assistant referee
AFC	Fu Hongjue (China)
AFC	Sarah Ho (Australia)
AFC	Airlie Keen (Australia)
AFC	Kim Kyoung-min (South Korea)
AFC	Liu Hongjuan (China)
AFC	Liu Hsiu-mei (Chinese Taipei)
AFC	Hisae Yoshizawa (Japan)
CAF	Tempa Ndah (Benin)
CAF	Souad Oulhaj (Morocco)
CONCACAF	Cynette Jeffery (Guyana)
CONCACAF	Cindy Mohammed (Trinidad & Tobago)
CONCACAF	Rita Muñoz (Mexico)
CONCACAF	María Isabel Tovar (Mexico)
CONMEBOL	Rosa Canales (Ecuador)
UEFA	Susanne Borg (Sweden)
UEFA	Cristina Cini (Italy)
UEFA	Miriam Dräger (Germany)
UEFA	Corinne Lagrange (France)
UEFA	Irina Mirt (Romania)
UEFA	Hege Lanes Steinlund (Norway)
UEFA	María Luisa Villa Gutiérrez (Spain)
UEFA	Karine Vives Solana (France)

== Draw ==
The group draw took place on 22 April 2007 at the Guanggu Science and Technology Exhibition Centre in Wuhan after the completion of the qualifying rounds.

FIFA automatically seeded the host and defending champions, slotting China and Germany into Group D and Group A, respectively. The FIFA Women's World Ranking for March 2007 was used to determine the teams to occupy the other seeded positions, B1 and C1. United States were ranked first, Germany second and Norway third, so the United States and Norway were also seeded.

Also, no two teams from the same confederation could draw each other, except for those from UEFA, where a maximum of two teams from UEFA could be drawn into the same group. Group B quickly became dubbed the group of death since three of the top five teams in the world were drawn in this group – the USA (1st), Sweden (3rd) and North Korea (5th), according to the June 2007 FIFA Women's World Rankings, the last to be released before the tournament. The same four teams were drawn together in Group A in the 2003 FIFA Women's World Cup, on that occasion the US and Sweden progressed to the knockout stages.

Pot 1	Pot 2	Pot 3	Pot 4	Pot X
China (D1); Germany (A1); Norway; United States	Australia; Japan; North Korea	Denmark; England; Sweden	Argentina; Ghana; New Zealand; Nigeria	Brazil; Canada

== Group stage ==
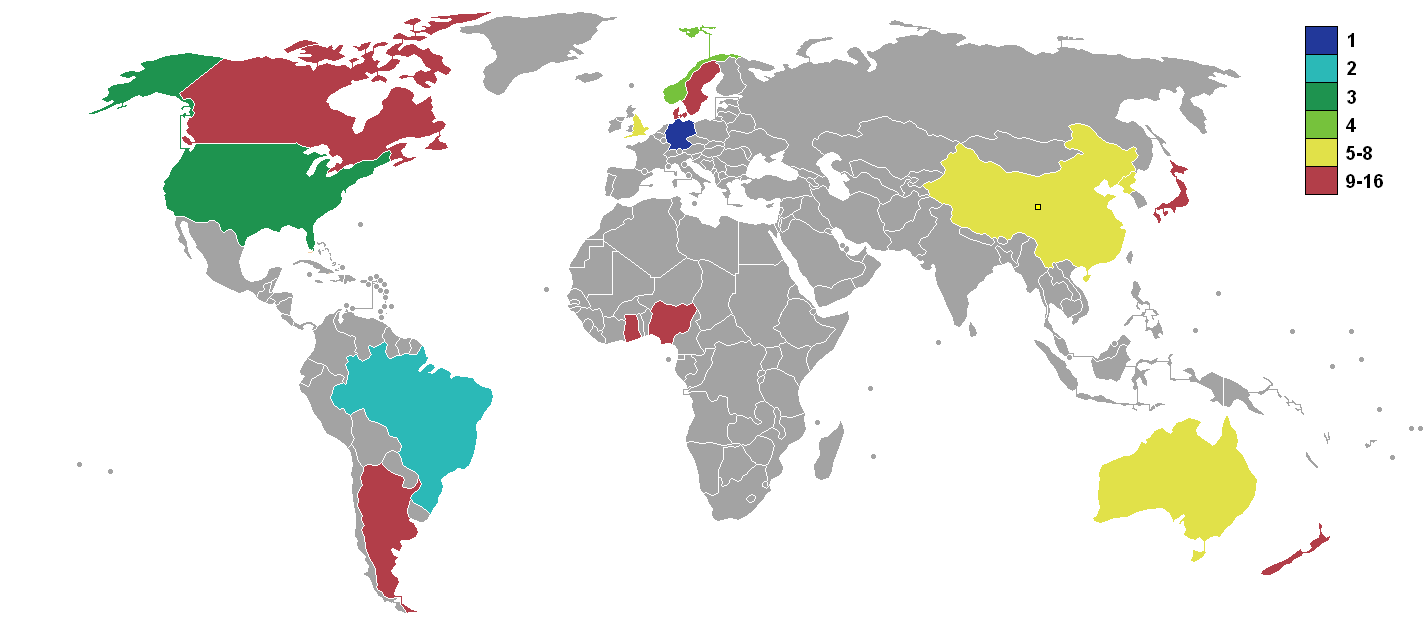
Participating countries and their results

All times are local (UTC+8).

Tie-breaking criteria for group play
The ranking of teams in the group stage was determined as follows:
1. Points obtained in all group matches (three points for a win, one for a draw, none for a defeat);
2. Goal difference in all group matches;
3. Number of goals scored in all group matches;
4. Points obtained in the matches played between the teams in question;
5. Goal difference in the matches played between the teams in question;
6. Number of goals scored in the matches played between the teams in question;
7. Fair play criteria based on yellow and red cards received;
8. Drawing of lots.

=== Group A ===
Pos	Team	Pld	W	D	L	GF	GA	GD	Pts	Qualification
1	Germany	3	2	1	0	13	0	+13	7	Advance to knockout stage
2	England	3	1	2	0	8	3	+5	5	Advance to knockout stage
3	Japan	3	1	1	1	3	4	−1	4	
4	Argentina	3	0	0	3	1	18	−17	0	

Source: FIFA
10 September 2007
20:00

Germany	11–0	Argentina
Behringer 12', 24'; Garefrekes 17'; Prinz 29', 45+1', 59'; Lingor 51', 90+1'; Smisek 57', 70', 79'	Report

Hongkou Football Stadium, Shanghai
Attendance: 28,098
Referee: Tammy Ogston (Australia)
11 September 2007
20:00

Japan	2–2	England
Miyama 55', 90+5'	Report	K. Smith 81', 83'

Hongkou Football Stadium, Shanghai
Attendance: 27,146
Referee: Kari Seitz (United States)

14 September 2007
17:00

Argentina	0–1	Japan
	Report	Nagasato 90+1'

Hongkou Football Stadium, Shanghai
Attendance: 27,730
Referee: Dagmar Damková (Czech Republic)
14 September 2007
20:00

England	0–0	Germany
	Report

Hongkou Football Stadium, Shanghai
Attendance: 27,730
Referee: Jenny Palmqvist (Sweden)

17 September 2007 (Note: The two matches that were originally scheduled on 18 September were moved to a day earlier due to commemorations for the Mukden Incident.)
20:00

Germany	2–0	Japan
Prinz 21'; Lingor 87' (pen.)	Report

Yellow Dragon Stadium, Hangzhou
Attendance: 39,817
Referee: Adriana Correa (Colombia)
17 September 2007
20:00

England	6–1	Argentina
González 9' (o.g.); J. Scott 10'; Williams 50' (pen.); K. Smith 64', 77'; Exley 90' (pen.)	Report	González 60'

Chengdu Sports Centre Stadium, Chengdu
Attendance: 30,730
Referee: Dianne Ferreira-James (Guyana)

=== Group B ===
Pos	Team	Pld	W	D	L	GF	GA	GD	Pts	Qualification
1	United States	3	2	1	0	5	2	+3	7	Advance to knockout stage
2	North Korea	3	1	1	1	5	4	+1	4	Advance to knockout stage
3	Sweden	3	1	1	1	3	4	−1	4	
4	Nigeria	3	0	1	2	1	4	−3	1	

Source: FIFA

The four teams were also paired in the same group in 2003.

11 September 2007
17:00

United States	2–2	North Korea
Wambach 50'; O'Reilly 69'	Report	Kil Son-hui 58'; Kim Yong-ae 62'

Chengdu Sports Centre Stadium, Chengdu
Attendance: 35,100
Referee: Nicole Petignat (Switzerland)
11 September 2007
20:00

Nigeria	1–1	Sweden
Uwak 82'	Report	Svensson 50'

Chengdu Sports Centre Stadium, Chengdu
Attendance: 35,100
Referee: Niu Huijun (China PR)

14 September 2007
17:00

Sweden	0–2	United States
	Report	Wambach 34' (pen.), 58'

Chengdu Sports Centre Stadium, Chengdu
Attendance: 35,600
Referee: Gyöngyi Gaál (Hungary)
14 September 2007
20:00

North Korea	2–0	Nigeria
Kim Kyong-hwa 17'; Ri Kum-suk 21'	Report

Chengdu Sports Centre Stadium, Chengdu
Attendance: 35,600
Referee: Tammy Ogston (Australia)

18 September 2007
20:00

Nigeria	0–1	United States
	Report	Chalupny 1'

Hongkou Football Stadium, Shanghai
Attendance: 6,100
Referee: Mayumi Oiwa (Japan)
18 September 2007
20:00

North Korea	1–2	Sweden
Ri Un-suk 22'	Report	Schelin 4', 54'

Tianjin Olympic Center Stadium, Tianjin
Attendance: 33,196
Referee: Christine Beck (Germany)

=== Group C ===
Pos	Team	Pld	W	D	L	GF	GA	GD	Pts	Qualification
1	Norway	3	2	1	0	10	4	+6	7	Advance to knockout stage
2	Australia	3	1	2	0	7	4	+3	5	Advance to knockout stage
3	Canada	3	1	1	1	7	4	+3	4	
4	Ghana	3	0	0	3	3	15	−12	0	

Source: FIFA
12 September 2007
17:00

Ghana	1–4	Australia
Amankwa 70'	Report	Walsh 15'; De Vanna 57', 81'; Garriock 69'

Yellow Dragon Stadium, Hangzhou
Attendance: 30,752
Referee: Adriana Correa (Colombia)
12 September 2007
20:00

Norway	2–1	Canada
R. Gulbrandsen 52'; Stangeland Horpestad 81'	Report	Chapman 33'

Yellow Dragon Stadium, Hangzhou
Attendance: 30,752
Referee: Christine Beck (Germany)

15 September 2007
17:00

Canada	4–0	Ghana
Sinclair 16', 62'; Schmidt 55'; Franko 77'	Report

Yellow Dragon Stadium, Hangzhou
Attendance: 33,835
Referee: Nicole Petignat (Switzerland)
15 September 2007
20:00

Australia	1–1	Norway
De Vanna 83'	Report	R. Gulbrandsen 5'

Yellow Dragon Stadium, Hangzhou
Attendance: 33,835
Referee: Niu Huijun (China PR)

20 September 2007 (Note: The Norway v Ghana match, originally scheduled on 19 September at Hongkou Football Stadium, Shanghai, was postponed by FIFA to the following day and moved to Yellow Dragon Stadium, Hangzhou, due to Typhoon Wipha. FIFA also delayed the Australia v Canada match, originally scheduled on 19 September to the following day. This was to allow for simultaneous kick-off times on the final matchday of the group, after it was confirmed that weather conditions would not affect the rescheduling.)
17:00

Norway	7–2	Ghana
Storløkken 4'; R. Gulbrandsen 39', 59', 62'; Stangeland Horpestad 45' (pen.); Herlovsen 56'; Klaveness 69'	Report	Bayor 73'; Okoe 80' (pen.)

Yellow Dragon Stadium, Hangzhou
Attendance: 43,817
Referee: Jennifer Bennett (United States)
20 September 2007
17:00

Australia	2–2	Canada
McCallum 53'; Salisbury 90+2'	Report	Tancredi 1'; Sinclair 85'

Chengdu Sports Centre Stadium, Chengdu
Attendance: 29,300
Referee: Gyöngyi Gaál (Hungary)

=== Group D ===
Pos	Team	Pld	W	D	L	GF	GA	GD	Pts	Qualification
1	Brazil	3	3	0	0	10	0	+10	9	Advance to knockout stage
2	China (H)	3	2	0	1	5	6	−1	6	Advance to knockout stage
3	Denmark	3	1	0	2	4	4	0	3	
4	New Zealand	3	0	0	3	0	9	−9	0	

Source: FIFA
(H) Hosts
12 September 2007
17:00

New Zealand	0–5	Brazil
	Report	Daniela 10'; Cristiane 54'; Marta 74', 90+3'; Renata Costa 86'

Wuhan Sports Centre Stadium, Wuhan
Attendance: 50,800
Referee: Pannipar Kamnueng (Thailand)
12 September 2007
20:00

China	3–2	Denmark
Li Jie 31'; Bi Yan 50'; Song Xiaoli 88'	Report	Nielsen 51'; Sørensen 87'

Wuhan Sports Centre Stadium, Wuhan
Attendance: 50,800
Referee: Dianne Ferreira-James (Guyana)

15 September 2007
17:00

Denmark	2–0	New Zealand
K. Pedersen 61'; Sørensen 66'	Report

Wuhan Sports Centre Stadium, Wuhan
Attendance: 54,000
Referee: Mayumi Oiwa (Japan)
15 September 2007
20:00

Brazil	4–0	China
Marta 42', 70'; Cristiane 47', 48'	Report

Wuhan Sports Centre Stadium, Wuhan
Attendance: 54,000
Referee: Jennifer Bennett (United States)

20 September 2007 (Note: The Brazil v Denmark match, originally scheduled on 19 September was postponed to the following day due to Typhoon Wipha. FIFA also delayed the China v New Zealand match, originally scheduled on 19 September. This was to allow for simultaneous kick-off times on the final matchday of the group, after it was confirmed that weather conditions would not affect the rescheduling.)
20:00

China	2–0	New Zealand
Li Jie 57'; Xie Caixia 79'	Report

Tianjin Olympic Center Stadium, Tianjin
Attendance: 55,832
Referee: Dagmar Damková (Czech Republic)
20 September 2007
20:00

Brazil	1–0	Denmark
Pretinha 90+1'	Report

Yellow Dragon Stadium, Hangzhou
Attendance: 43,817
Referee: Kari Seitz (United States)

== Knockout stage ==
=== Bracket ===
Quarter-finals
22 September – Wuhan
Germany	3
North Korea	0
23 September – Wuhan
Norway	1
China	0
22 September – Tianjin
United States	3
England	0
23 September – Tianjin
Brazil	3
Australia	2

Semi-finals
26 September – Tianjin
Germany	3
Norway	0
27 September – Hangzhou
United States	0
Brazil	4

Final
30 September – Shanghai
Germany	2
Brazil	0
Third place play-off
30 September – Shanghai
Norway	1
United States	4

=== Quarter-finals ===
22 September 2007
17:00

Germany	3–0	North Korea
Garefrekes 44'; Lingor 67'; Krahn 72'	Report

Wuhan Sports Centre Stadium, Wuhan
Attendance: 37,200
Referee: Tammy Ogston (Australia)

22 September 2007
20:00

United States	3–0	England
Wambach 48'; Boxx 57'; Lilly 60'	Report

Tianjin Olympic Center Stadium, Tianjin
Attendance: 29,586
Referee: Jenny Palmqvist (Sweden)

23 September 2007
17:00

Norway	1–0	China
Herlovsen 32'	Report

Wuhan Sports Centre Stadium, Wuhan
Attendance: 52,000
Referee: Gyöngyi Gaál (Hungary)

23 September 2007
20:00

Brazil	3–2	Australia
Formiga 4'; Marta 23' (pen.); Cristiane 75'	Report	De Vanna 36'; Colthorpe 68'

Tianjin Olympic Center Stadium, Tianjin
Attendance: 35,061
Referee: Christine Beck (Germany)

=== Semi-finals ===
26 September 2007
20:00

Germany	3–0	Norway
Rønning 42' (o.g.); Stegemann 72'; Müller 75'	Report

Tianjin Olympic Center Stadium, Tianjin
Attendance: 53,819
Referee: Dagmar Damková (Czech Republic)

27 September 2007
20:00

United States	0–4	Brazil
	Report	Osborne 20' (o.g.); Marta 27', 79'; Cristiane 56'

Yellow Dragon Stadium, Hangzhou
Attendance: 47,818
Referee: Nicole Petignat (Switzerland)

=== Third place play-off ===
30 September 2007
17:00

Norway	1–4	United States
R. Gulbrandsen 63'	Report	Wambach 30', 46'; Chalupny 58'; O'Reilly 59'

Hongkou Football Stadium, Shanghai
Attendance: 31,000
Referee: Gyöngyi Gaál (Hungary)

=== Final ===
30 September 2007
20:00

Germany	2–0	Brazil
Prinz 52'; Laudehr 86'	Report

Hongkou Football Stadium, Shanghai
Attendance: 31,000
Referee: Tammy Ogston (Australia)

== Awards ==
The following awards were given at the conclusion of the tournament. FIFA.com shortlisted ten goals for users to vote on as the Goal of the Tournament. The Most Entertaining Team award was also decided by a poll on FIFA.com.

Golden Ball	Silver Ball	Bronze Ball
(Brazil) Marta	(Germany) Birgit Prinz	(Brazil) Cristiane
Golden Shoe	Silver Shoe	Bronze Shoe
(Brazil) Marta	(United States) Abby Wambach	(Norway) Ragnhild Gulbrandsen
7 goals, 5 assists	6 goals, 1 assist	6 goals, 0 assists
Best Goalkeeper
(Germany) Nadine Angerer
Goal of the Tournament
(Brazil) Marta
79' for 4–0 in Semi-finals vs United States (27 September)
FIFA Fair Play Award
Norway
Most Entertaining Team
Brazil

=== All-Star Team ===
Goalkeepers	Defenders	Midfielders	Forwards
(Germany) Nadine Angerer (Norway) Bente Nordby	(Germany) Ariane Hingst (China) Li Jie (Norway) Ane Stangeland (Germany) Kerstin Stegemann	(Brazil) Daniela (Brazil) Formiga (England) Kelly Smith (Germany) Renate Lingor (Norway) Ingvild Stensland (United States) Kristine Lilly	(Australia) Lisa De Vanna (Brazil) Marta (Brazil) Cristiane (Germany) Birgit Prinz

== Statistics ==
=== Goalscorers ===
There were 111 goals scored in 32 matches, for an average of 3.47 goals per match. Marta of Brazil won the Golden Shoe award for scoring seven goals.

7 goals

- (Brazil) Marta

6 goals

- (Norway) Ragnhild Gulbrandsen
- (United States) Abby Wambach

5 goals

- (Brazil) Cristiane
- (Germany) Birgit Prinz

4 goals

- (Australia) Lisa De Vanna
- (England) Kelly Smith
- (Germany) Renate Lingor

3 goals

- (Canada) Christine Sinclair
- (Germany) Sandra Smisek

2 goals

- (China) Li Jie
- (Denmark) Cathrine Paaske Sørensen
- (Germany) Melanie Behringer
- (Germany) Kerstin Garefrekes
- (Japan) Aya Miyama
- (Norway) Isabell Herlovsen
- (Norway) Ane Stangeland Horpestad
- (Sweden) Lotta Schelin
- (United States) Lori Chalupny
- (United States) Heather O'Reilly

1 goal

- (Argentina) Eva González
- (Australia) Lauren Colthorpe
- (Australia) Heather Garriock
- (Australia) Collette McCallum
- (Australia) Cheryl Salisbury
- (Australia) Sarah Walsh
- (Brazil) Daniela
- (Brazil) Formiga
- (Brazil) Pretinha
- (Brazil) Renata Costa
- (Canada) Candace Chapman
- (Canada) Martina Franko
- (Canada) Sophie Schmidt
- (Canada) Melissa Tancredi
- (China) Bi Yan
- (China) Song Xiaoli
- (China) Xie Caixia
- (Denmark) Anne Dot Eggers Nielsen
- (Denmark) Katrine Pedersen
- (England) Vicky Exley
- (England) Jill Scott
- (England) Fara Williams
- (Germany) Annike Krahn
- (Germany) Simone Laudehr
- (Germany) Martina Müller
- (Germany) Kerstin Stegemann
- (Ghana) Anita Amankwa
- (Ghana) Adjoa Bayor
- (Ghana) Florence Okoe
- (Japan) Yūki Nagasato
- (Nigeria) Cynthia Uwak
- (North Korea) Kil Son-hui
- (North Korea) Kim Kyong-hwa
- (North Korea) Kim Yong-ae
- (North Korea) Ri Kum-suk
- (North Korea) Ri Un-suk
- (Norway) Lise Klaveness
- (Norway) Lene Storløkken
- (Sweden) Victoria Svensson
- (United States) Shannon Boxx
- (United States) Kristine Lilly

1 own goal

- (Argentina) Eva González (against England)
- (Norway) Trine Rønning (against Germany)
- (United States) Leslie Osborne (against Brazil)

=== Assists ===
3 assists

- (Canada) Kara Lang
- (Germany) Kerstin Garefrekes
- (Germany) Renate Lingor
- (United States) Kristine Lilly

2 assists

- (Australia) Heather Garriock
- (Brazil) Cristiane
- (Brazil) Formiga
- (Brazil) Marta
- (Germany) Melanie Behringer
- (Germany) Sandra Smisek
- (Norway) Camilla Huse
- (Norway) Leni Larsen Kaurin
- (United States) Cat Whitehill

1 assist

- (Australia) Dianne Alagich
- (Australia) Lisa De Vanna
- (Australia) Caitlin Munoz
- (Australia) Sarah Walsh
- (Brazil) Daniela
- (Brazil) Elaine
- (Canada) Candace Chapman
- (Canada) Kristina Kiss
- (Canada) Christine Sinclair
- (China) Ma Xiaoxu
- (China) Zhou Gaoping
- (Denmark) Stine Dimun
- (Denmark) Katrine Pedersen
- (Denmark) Johanna Rasmussen
- (England) Karen Carney
- (England) Rachel Yankey
- (Germany) Simone Laudehr
- (Germany) Birgit Prinz
- (Germany) Kerstin Stegemann
- (Ghana) Adjoa Bayor
- (Norway) Gunhild Følstad
- (Norway) Solveig Gulbrandsen
- (Norway) Siri Nordby
- (Norway) Ingvild Stensland
- (Sweden) Frida Östberg
- (Sweden) Therese Sjögran
- (Sweden) Victoria Svensson
- (United States) Lori Chalupny
- (United States) Abby Wambach

Source: FIFA Technical Report

=== Tournament ranking ===
Per statistical convention in football, matches decided in extra time are counted as wins and losses, while matches decided by penalty shoot-outs are counted as draws.

Pos	Grp	Team	Pld	W	D	L	GF	GA	GD	Pts	Final result
1	A	Germany	6	5	1	0	21	0	+21	16	Champions
2	D	Brazil	6	5	0	1	17	4	+13	15	Runners-up
3	B	United States	6	4	1	1	12	7	+5	13	Third place
4	C	Norway	6	3	1	2	12	11	+1	10	Fourth place
5	D	China (H)	4	2	0	2	5	7	−2	6	Eliminated in quarter-finals
6	C	Australia	4	1	2	1	9	7	+2	5	Eliminated in quarter-finals
7	A	England	4	1	2	1	8	6	+2	5	Eliminated in quarter-finals
8	B	North Korea	4	1	1	2	5	7	−2	4	Eliminated in quarter-finals
9	C	Canada	3	1	1	1	7	4	+3	4	Eliminated in group stage
10	A	Japan	3	1	1	1	3	4	−1	4	Eliminated in group stage
10	B	Sweden	3	1	1	1	3	4	−1	4	Eliminated in group stage
12	D	Denmark	3	1	0	2	4	4	0	3	Eliminated in group stage
13	B	Nigeria	3	0	1	2	1	4	−3	1	Eliminated in group stage
14	D	New Zealand	3	0	0	3	0	9	−9	0	Eliminated in group stage
15	C	Ghana	3	0	0	3	3	15	−12	0	Eliminated in group stage
16	A	Argentina	3	0	0	3	1	18	−17	0	Eliminated in group stage

Source: FIFA Technical Report
(H) Hosts

== Marketing ==
=== Sponsorships ===
FIFA partners	National Supporters
Adidas; Coca-Cola; Emirates; Hyundai–Kia; Sony; Visa	Du-Bang Insurance; Tencent QQ

== Coverage ==
Numerous TV stations around the world provided coverage of the tournament. One notable example is the Chinese-language channel CCTV-5, which also broadcast over the internet via TVUnetworks.

== Monetary rewards ==
For the first time in FIFA Women's World Cup history, all teams received monetary bonuses according to the round they reached (all in USD):

- Champions: $1,000,000
- Runners-up: $800,000
- Third place: $650,000
- Fourth place: $550,000
- Quarter-finalists: $300,000
- First round exit: $200,000

=== Other rewards ===
UEFA used the FIFA Women's World Cup as its qualifying tournament for the 2008 Olympic women's tournament. The best three performing UEFA teams would qualify for the Olympics. Originally it was thought that, should England make the top three European teams, they would compete under the United Kingdom banner. However, on 6 September 2007, FIFA issued a press release indicating that England were ineligible to participate in the 2008 Olympics as England does not have its own Olympic Committee. For the determination of the ranking only first through fourth place, quarterfinal elimination or group phase elimination counted. If there was a need to make a distinction between teams eliminated in the quarterfinal or between teams eliminated in the group phase these teams would meet in a play-off match. In no case would the points or goal difference count for teams eliminated before the semi-final.

Germany and Norway qualified for the Olympics at the World Cup, whereas Denmark and Sweden had to enter a play-off for the third Olympics spot. Sweden won both legs of the playoffs with a total of 7–3 on aggregate to qualify for the Olympics.

== Controversies ==
Kenneth Heiner-Møller and Danish players accused the Chinese hosts of harassment and covert surveillance prior to China's first round match against Denmark. China's Swedish coach Marika Domanski-Lyfors and her assistant Pia Sundhage were unaware of the incidents and Heiner-Møller absolved them of any blame, although he refused to shake hands after the match.
