= 2011 FIFA Women's World Cup Group C =

Football tournament group stage

Group C of the 2011 FIFA Women's World Cup consisted of the teams from the United States, North Korea, Colombia, and Sweden. The games were played on 28 June, 2 July, and 6 July 2011. The top two teams advanced to the knockout stage. Sweden, North Korea and the United States were drawn together for the third World Cup in succession, with the latter pair also in the same group in 1999.

The United States finished as group runners-up for the first time in Women's World Cup history, while Sweden won a Women's World Cup group for the first time ever.

== Standings ==
Pos	Team	Pld	W	D	L	GF	GA	GD	Pts	Qualification
1	Sweden	3	3	0	0	4	1	+3	9	Advance to knockout stage
2	United States	3	2	0	1	6	2	+4	6	Advance to knockout stage
3	North Korea	3	0	1	2	0	3	−3	1	
4	Colombia	3	0	1	2	0	4	−4	1	

Source: FIFA
Rules for classification: Group stage tiebreakers

== Matches ==
=== Colombia vs Sweden ===
28 June 2011
15:00

Colombia	0–1	Sweden
	Report	Landström 57'

BayArena, Leverkusen
Attendance: 21,106
Referee: Carol Anne Chenard (Canada)

Colombia	Sweden

COLOMBIA:
GK	12	Sandra Sepúlveda
RB	5	Nataly Arias
CB	14	Kelis Peduzine
CB	3	Natalia Gaitán (c)
LB	9	Carmen Rodallega
RM	4	Diana Ospina
CM	6	Daniela Montoya	(substituted off) 66'
CM	10	Yoreli Rincón
LM	8	Andrea Peralta	(substituted off) 79'
CF	16	Lady Andrade
CF	7	Catalina Usme	(substituted off) 59'
Substitutions:
FW	18	Katerin Castro	(substituted in) 59'
MF	13	Yulieth Domínguez	(substituted in) 66'
FW	17	Ingrid Vidal	(substituted in) 79'
Manager:
Ricardo Rozo

SWEDEN:
GK	1	Hedvig Lindahl
RB	4	Annica Svensson
CB	7	Sara Larsson
CB	2	Charlotte Rohlin
LB	6	Sara Thunebro
CM	17	Lisa Dahlkvist
CM	5	Caroline Seger (c)	(yellow card) 29'	(substituted off) 69'
RW	16	Linda Forsberg		(substituted off) 54'
LW	15	Therese Sjögran
CF	8	Lotta Schelin
CF	9	Jessica Landström		(substituted off) 81'
Substitutions:
MF	10	Sofia Jakobsson		(substituted in) 54'
MF	18	Nilla Fischer		(substituted in) 69'
FW	19	Madelaine Edlund		(substituted in) 81'
Manager:
Thomas Dennerby

Player of the Match:
Jessica Landström (Sweden)

Assistant referees:
Emperatriz Ayala (El Salvador)
Cindy Mohammed (Trinidad and Tobago)
Fourth official:
Therese Neguel (Cameroon)

=== United States vs North Korea ===
28 June 2011
18:15

United States	2–0	North Korea
Cheney 54'; Buehler 76'	Report

Rudolf-Harbig-Stadion, Dresden
Attendance: 21,859
Referee: Bibiana Steinhaus (Germany)

United States	Korea DPR

UNITED STATES:
GK	1	Hope Solo
RB	11	Ali Krieger
CB	3	Christie Rampone (c)
CB	19	Rachel Buehler
LB	6	Amy LePeilbet
DM	7	Shannon Boxx
CM	10	Carli Lloyd
RW	9	Heather O'Reilly	(substituted off) 79'
LW	12	Lauren Cheney
CF	20	Abby Wambach
CF	8	Amy Rodriguez	(substituted off) 75'
Substitutions:
FW	13	Alex Morgan	(substituted in) 75'
MF	15	Megan Rapinoe	(substituted in) 79'
Manager:
(Sweden) Pia Sundhage

KOREA DPR:
GK	1	Hong Myong-Hui
RB	5	Song Jong-Sun
CB	17	Ri Un-Hyang
CB	16	Jong Pok-Sim
LB	3	Ho Un-Byol	(substituted off) 81'
CM	10	Jo Yun-mi (c)
CM	12	Jon Myong-Hwa	(substituted off) 68'
RW	8	Kim Su-Gyong
LW	11	Ri Ye-Gyong
CF	9	Ra Un-Sim
CF	7	Yun Hyon-Hi	(substituted off) 48'
Substitutions:
DF	6	Paek Sol-Hui	(substituted in) 48'
MF	13	Kim Un-ju	(substituted in) 68'
FW	20	Kwon Song-Hwa	(substituted in) 81'
Manager:
Kim Kwang-min

Player of the Match:
Abby Wambach (United States)

Assistant referees:
Katrin Rafalski (Germany)
Marina Wozniak (Germany)
Fourth official:
Gyöngyi Gaál (Hungary)

=== North Korea vs Sweden ===
2 July 2011
14:00

North Korea	0–1	Sweden
	Report	Dahlkvist 64'

Impuls Arena, Augsburg
Attendance: 23,768
Referee: Estela Álvarez (Argentina)

Korea DPR	Sweden

KOREA DPR:
GK	1	Hong Myong-Hui
RB	5	Song Jong-Sun
CB	17	Ri Un-Hyang
CB	16	Jong Pok-Sim
LB	3	Ho Un-Byol
CM	10	Jo Yun-mi (c)
CM	12	Jon Myong-Hwa
RW	8	Kim Su-Gyong	(substituted off) 68'
LW	11	Ri Ye-Gyong	(substituted off) 83'
CF	9	Ra Un-Sim
CF	7	Yun Hyon-Hi	(substituted off) 80'
Substitutions:
MF	13	Kim Un-ju	(substituted in) 68'
FW	19	Choe Mi-Gyong	(substituted in) 80'
MF	14	Kim Chung-Sim	(substituted in) 83'
Manager:
Kim Kwang-min

SWEDEN:
GK	1	Hedvig Lindahl
RB	4	Annica Svensson
CB	7	Sara Larsson
CB	2	Charlotte Rohlin
LB	6	Sara Thunebro
CM	17	Lisa Dahlkvist
CM	5	Caroline Seger (c)	(yellow card) 60'
RW	16	Linda Forsberg
LW	15	Therese Sjögran		(substituted off) 87'
CF	8	Lotta Schelin
CF	9	Jessica Landström		(substituted off) 77'
Substitutions:
FW	14	Josefine Öqvist		(substituted in) 77'
MF	18	Nilla Fischer		(substituted in) 87'
Manager:
Thomas Dennerby

Player of the Match:
Caroline Seger (Sweden)

Assistant referees:
Maria Rocco (Argentina)
Yoly García (Venezuela)
Fourth official:
Finau Vulivuli (Fiji)

=== United States vs Colombia ===
2 July 2011
18:00

United States	3–0	Colombia
O'Reilly 12'; Rapinoe 50'; Lloyd 57'	Report

Rhein-Neckar-Arena, Sinsheim
Attendance: 25,475
Referee: Dagmar Damková (Czech Republic)

United States	Colombia

UNITED STATES:
GK	1	Hope Solo
RB	11	Ali Krieger
CB	3	Christie Rampone (c)
CB	19	Rachel Buehler
LB	6	Amy LePeilbet		(substituted off) 56'
CM	10	Carli Lloyd
CM	16	Lori Lindsey
RW	9	Heather O'Reilly		(substituted off) 62'
LW	12	Lauren Cheney
CF	20	Abby Wambach	(yellow card) 84'
CF	8	Amy Rodriguez		(substituted off) 46'
Substitutions:
MF	15	Megan Rapinoe		(substituted in) 46'
DF	14	Stephanie Cox		(substituted in) 56'
MF	17	Tobin Heath		(substituted in) 62'
Manager:
(Sweden) Pia Sundhage

COLOMBIA:
GK	12	Sandra Sepúlveda
RB	5	Nataly Arias
CB	14	Kelis Peduzine
CB	3	Natalia Gaitán (c)
LB	9	Carmen Rodallega
DM	13	Yulieth Domínguez
RM	4	Diana Ospina
LM	19	Fatima Montaño
AM	11	Liana Salazar	(substituted off) 55'
CF	18	Katerin Castro
CF	7	Catalina Usme	(substituted off) 53'
Substitutions:
DF	20	Orianica Velásquez	(substituted in) 53'
MF	10	Yoreli Rincón	(substituted in) 55'
Manager:
Ricardo Rozo

Player of the Match:
Carli Lloyd (United States)

Assistant referees:
Maria Luisa Villa Gutierrez (Spain)
Yolanda Parga Rodriguez (Spain)
Fourth official:
Jacqui Melksham (Australia)

=== Sweden vs United States ===
6 July 2011
20:45

Sweden	2–1	United States
Dahlkvist 16' (pen.); LePeilbet 35' (o.g.)	Report	Wambach 67'

Volkswagen Arena, Wolfsburg
Attendance: 23,468
Referee: Etsuko Fukano (Japan)

Sweden	United States

SWEDEN:
GK	1	Hedvig Lindahl
RB	4	Annica Svensson
CB	7	Sara Larsson
CB	2	Charlotte Rohlin
LB	6	Sara Thunebro
CM	18	Nilla Fischer (c)	(yellow card) 60'	(substituted off) 88'
CM	17	Lisa Dahlkvist		(substituted off) 77'
RW	16	Linda Forsberg
LW	15	Therese Sjögran		(substituted off) 65'
CF	8	Lotta Schelin
CF	14	Josefine Öqvist
Substitutions:
MF	11	Antonia Göransson		(substituted in) 65'
MF	20	Marie Hammarström		(substituted in) 77'
DF	3	Linda Sembrant		(substituted in) 88'
Manager:
Thomas Dennerby

UNITED STATES:
GK	1	Hope Solo
RB	11	Ali Krieger
CB	19	Rachel Buehler
CB	3	Christie Rampone (c)
LB	6	Amy LePeilbet	(yellow card) 14'	(substituted off) 59'
RM	15	Megan Rapinoe		(substituted off) 73'
CM	10	Carli Lloyd
CM	7	Shannon Boxx
LM	12	Lauren Cheney
CF	20	Abby Wambach
CF	8	Amy Rodriguez		(substituted off) 46'
Substitutions:
FW	13	Alex Morgan		(substituted in) 46'
DF	14	Stephanie Cox		(substituted in) 59'
DF	5	Kelley O'Hara		(substituted in) 73'
Manager:
(Sweden) Pia Sundhage

Player of the Match:
Lotta Schelin (Sweden)

Assistant referees:
Saori Takahashi (Japan)
Zhang Lingling (China)
Fourth official:
Therese Neguel (Cameroon)

=== North Korea vs Colombia ===
6 July 2011
20:45

North Korea	0–0	Colombia
	Report

Ruhrstadion, Bochum
Attendance: 7,805
Referee: Christina Pedersen (Norway)

Korea DPR	Colombia

KOREA DPR:
GK	1	Hong Myong-Hui
RB	5	Song Jong-Sun
CB	17	Ri Un-Hyang
CB	16	Jong Pok-Sim
LB	3	Ho Un-Byol
RM	8	Kim Su-Gyong		(substituted off) 48'
CM	10	Jo Yun-mi (c)
CM	12	Jon Myong-Hwa
LM	11	Ri Ye-Gyong
CF	9	Ra Un-Sim		(substituted off) 56'
CF	13	Kim Un-ju
Substitutions:
MF	14	Kim Chung-Sim		(substituted in) 48'
FW	7	Yun Hyon-Hi	(substituted in) 56'	(substituted off) 76'
FW	19	Choe Mi-Gyong		(substituted in) 76'
Manager:
Kim Kwang-min

COLOMBIA:
GK	12	Sandra Sepúlveda
RB	5	Nataly Arias
CB	3	Natalia Gaitán (c)
CB	14	Kelis Peduzine
LB	20	Orianica Velásquez
CM	6	Daniela Montoya	(substituted off) 89'
CM	13	Yulieth Domínguez
RW	4	Diana Ospina
LW	19	Fatima Montaño
CF	18	Katerin Castro	(substituted off) 88'
CF	9	Carmen Rodallega
Substitutions:
FW	17	Ingrid Vidal	(substituted in) 88'
MF	11	Liana Salazar	(substituted in) 89'
Manager:
Ricardo Rozo

Player of the Match:
Orianica Velásquez (Colombia)

Assistant referees:
Hege Steinlund (Norway)
Lada Rojc (Croatia)
Fourth official:
Quetzalli Alvarado (Mexico)

== See also ==
- Colombia at the FIFA Women's World Cup
- North Korea at the FIFA Women's World Cup
- Sweden at the FIFA Women's World Cup
- United States at the FIFA Women's World Cup
