= 2011 FIFA Women's World Cup knockout stage =

Football tournament knockout stage

The knockout stage of the 2011 FIFA Women's World Cup consisted of the top two teams of each of the four groups. It began on 9 July and ended with the final on 17 July 2011.

== Qualified teams ==
Group	Winners	Runners-up
A	Germany	France
B	England	Japan
C	Sweden	United States
D	Brazil	Australia

== Bracket ==
Quarter-finals
9 July – Wolfsburg
Germany	0
Japan (a.e.t.)	1
10 July – Augsburg
Sweden	3
Australia	1
9 July – Leverkusen
England	1 (3)
France (p)	1 (4)
10 July – Dresden
Brazil	2 (3)
United States (p)	2 (5)

Semi-finals
13 July – Frankfurt
Japan	3
Sweden	1
13 July – Mönchengladbach
France	1
United States	3

Final
17 July – Frankfurt
Japan (p)	2 (3)
United States	2 (1)
Third place play-off
16 July – Sinsheim
Sweden	2
France	1

== Quarter-finals ==
=== England vs France ===
9 July 2011
18:00

England	1–1 (a.e.t.)	France
J. Scott 59'	Report	Bussaglia 88'
Penalties
Smith (penalty scored); Carney (penalty scored); Stoney (penalty scored); Rafferty (penalty missed); F. White (penalty missed)	3–4	(penalty missed) Abily; (penalty scored) Bussaglia; (penalty scored) Thiney; (penalty scored) Bompastor; (penalty scored) Le Sommer

BayArena, Leverkusen
Attendance: 26,395
Referee: Jenny Palmqvist (Sweden)

England	France

ENGLAND:
GK	1	Karen Bardsley	(yellow card) 87'
RB	2	Alex Scott		(substituted off) 81'
CB	5	Faye White (c)
CB	6	Casey Stoney
LB	3	Rachel Unitt		(substituted off) 81'
CM	12	Karen Carney
CM	8	Fara Williams	(yellow card) 5'
CM	4	Jill Scott	(yellow card) 90+3'
AM	11	Rachel Yankey		(substituted off) 84'
CF	9	Ellen White	(yellow card) 77'
CF	10	Kelly Smith
Substitutions:
DF	16	Steph Houghton		(substituted on) 81'
DF	20	Claire Rafferty		(substituted on) 81'
DF	18	Anita Asante		(substituted on) 84'
Manager:
Hope Powell

FRANCE:
GK	1	Céline Deville
RB	11	Laure Lepailleur
CB	4	Laura Georges
CB	20	Sabrina Viguier
LB	8	Sonia Bompastor
CM	6	Sandrine Soubeyrand (c)		(substituted off) 67'
CM	15	Élise Bussaglia
RW	10	Camille Abily
AM	14	Louisa Necib		(substituted off) 79'
LW	17	Gaëtane Thiney
CF	18	Marie-Laure Delie
Substitutions:
FW	12	Élodie Thomis		(substituted on) 67'
FW	19	Sandrine Brétigny	(substituted on) 79'	(substituted off) 106'
FW	9	Eugénie Le Sommer		(substituted on) 106'
Manager:
Bruno Bini

Player of the Match:
Camille Abily (France)

Assistant referees:
Anna Nyström (Sweden)
Helen Karo (Sweden)
Fourth official:
Christina W. Pedersen (Norway)

=== Germany vs Japan ===
9 July 2011
20:45

Germany	0–1 (a.e.t.)	Japan
	Report	Maruyama 108'

Volkswagen Arena, Wolfsburg
Attendance: 26,067
Referee: Quetzalli Alvarado (Mexico)

Germany	Japan

GERMANY:
GK	1	Nadine Angerer
RB	10	Linda Bresonik		(substituted off) 65'
CB	5	Annike Krahn
CB	3	Saskia Bartusiak
LB	4	Babett Peter	(yellow card) 105+1'
CM	14	Kim Kulig		(substituted off) 8'
CM	6	Simone Laudehr
RW	18	Kerstin Garefrekes (c)
AM	13	Célia Okoyino da Mbabi
LW	7	Melanie Behringer
CF	8	Inka Grings		(substituted off) 102'
Substitutions:
DF	2	Bianca Schmidt		(substituted on) 8'
DF	20	Lena Goeßling		(substituted on) 65'
FW	11	Alexandra Popp		(substituted on) 102'
Manager:
Silvia Neid

JAPAN:
GK	21	Ayumi Kaihori
RB	2	Yukari Kinga
CB	3	Azusa Iwashimizu	(yellow card) 55'
CB	4	Saki Kumagai	(yellow card) 115'
LB	15	Aya Sameshima
DM	6	Mizuho Sakaguchi	(yellow card) 72'
RM	17	Yūki Nagasato		(substituted off) 46'
CM	10	Homare Sawa (c)	(yellow card) 87'
LM	8	Aya Miyama
SS	11	Shinobu Ohno		(substituted off) 66'
CF	7	Kozue Ando
Substitutions:
FW	18	Karina Maruyama		(substituted on) 46'
FW	20	Mana Iwabuchi	(substituted on) 66'	(substituted off) 116'
MF	13	Rumi Utsugi		(substituted on) 116'
Manager:
Norio Sasaki

Player of the Match:
Homare Sawa (Japan)

Assistant referees:
Rita Munoz (Mexico)
Mayte Chavez (Mexico)
Fourth official:
Carol Anne Chenard (Canada)

=== Sweden vs Australia ===
10 July 2011
13:00

Sweden	3–1	Australia
Sjögran 11'; Dahlkvist 16'; Schelin 52'	Report	Perry 40'

Impuls Arena, Augsburg
Attendance: 24,605
Referee: Silvia Reyes (Peru)

Sweden	Australia

SWEDEN:
GK	1	Hedvig Lindahl
RB	4	Annica Svensson		(substituted off) 90+2'
CB	7	Sara Larsson
CB	2	Charlotte Rohlin
LB	6	Sara Thunebro
CM	5	Caroline Seger (c)
CM	17	Lisa Dahlkvist
RW	16	Linda Forsberg		(substituted off) 67'
LW	15	Therese Sjögran	(yellow card) 67'
CF	8	Lotta Schelin
CF	14	Josefine Öqvist		(substituted off) 83'
Substitutions:
MF	18	Nilla Fischer	(yellow card) 81'	(substituted on) 67'
FW	19	Madelaine Edlund		(substituted on) 83'
DF	13	Lina Nilsson		(substituted on) 90+2'
Manager:
Thomas Dennerby

AUSTRALIA:
GK	1	Melissa Barbieri (c)
RB	6	Ellyse Perry		(substituted off) 59'
CB	10	Servet Uzunlar
CB	3	Kim Carroll
LB	8	Elise Kellond-Knight
RM	9	Caitlin Foord
CM	12	Emily van Egmond		(substituted off) 58'
CM	14	Collette McCallum		(substituted off) 79'
LM	7	Heather Garriock	(yellow card) 80'
CF	17	Kyah Simon	(yellow card) 23'
CF	11	Lisa De Vanna
Substitutions:
DF	4	Clare Polkinghorne		(substituted on) 58'
MF	13	Tameka Butt		(substituted on) 59'
MF	15	Sally Shipard		(substituted on) 79'
Manager:
(Scotland) Tom Sermanni

Player of the Match:
Lotta Schelin (Sweden)

Assistant referees:
Mariana Corbo (Uruguay)
Maria Rocco (Argentina)
Fourth official:
Dagmar Damková (Czech Republic)

=== Brazil vs United States ===
10 July 2011
17:30

Brazil	2–2 (a.e.t.)	United States
Marta 68' (pen.), 92'	Report	Daiane 2' (o.g.); Wambach 120+2'
Penalties
Cristiane (penalty scored); Marta (penalty scored); Daiane (penalty missed); Francielle (penalty scored)	3–5	(penalty scored) Boxx; (penalty scored) Lloyd; (penalty scored) Wambach; (penalty scored) Rapinoe; (penalty scored) Krieger

Rudolf-Harbig-Stadion, Dresden
Attendance: 25,598
Referee: Jacqui Melksham (Australia)

Brazil	United States

BRAZIL:
GK	1	Andréia
CB	4	Aline (c)	(yellow card) 44'
CB	3	Daiane
CB	13	Érika	(yellow card) 117'
DM	2	Maurine	(yellow card) 112'
RM	14	Fabiana
CM	8	Formiga		(substituted off) 113'
CM	7	Ester
LM	6	Rosana		(substituted off) 85'
CF	11	Cristiane
CF	10	Marta	(yellow card) 45'
Substitutions:
FW	15	Francielle		(substituted on) 85'
MF	5	Renata Costa		(substituted on) 113'
Manager:
Kleiton Lima

UNITED STATES:
GK	1	Hope Solo	(yellow card) 67'
RB	11	Ali Krieger
CB	19	Rachel Buehler	(red card) 65'
CB	3	Christie Rampone (c)
LB	6	Amy LePeilbet
CM	7	Shannon Boxx	(yellow card) 113'
CM	10	Carli Lloyd	(yellow card) 29'
RW	9	Heather O'Reilly		(substituted off) 108'
LW	12	Lauren Cheney		(substituted off) 55'
SS	8	Amy Rodriguez		(substituted off) 72'
CF	20	Abby Wambach
Substitutions:
MF	15	Megan Rapinoe	(yellow card) 90'	(substituted on) 55'
FW	13	Alex Morgan		(substituted on) 72'
MF	17	Tobin Heath		(substituted on) 108'
Manager:
(Sweden) Pia Sundhage

Player of the Match:
Hope Solo (United States)

Assistant referees:
Allyson Flynn (Australia)
Sarah Ho (Australia)
Fourth official:
Etsuko Fukano (Japan)

== Semi-finals ==
=== France vs United States ===
13 July 2011
18:00

France	1–3	United States
Bompastor 55'	Report	Cheney 9'; Wambach 79'; Morgan 82'

Borussia-Park, Mönchengladbach
Attendance: 25,676
Referee: Kirsi Heikkinen (Finland)

France	United States

FRANCE:
GK	16	Bérangère Sapowicz
RB	11	Laure Lepailleur
CB	4	Laura Georges
CB	5	Ophélie Meilleroux
LB	8	Sonia Bompastor
CM	6	Sandrine Soubeyrand (c)		(substituted off) 78'
CM	15	Élise Bussaglia
RW	10	Camille Abily
AM	14	Louisa Necib
LW	17	Gaëtane Thiney
CF	18	Marie-Laure Delie		(substituted off) 46'
Substitutions:
FW	9	Eugénie Le Sommer		(substituted on) 46'
FW	12	Élodie Thomis	(yellow card) 90'	(substituted on) 78'
Manager:
Bruno Bini

UNITED STATES:
GK	1	Hope Solo
RB	11	Ali Krieger
CB	3	Christie Rampone (c)
CB	4	Becky Sauerbrunn
LB	6	Amy LePeilbet
RM	9	Heather O'Reilly	(substituted off) 87'
CM	10	Carli Lloyd	(substituted off) 65'
CM	7	Shannon Boxx
LM	12	Lauren Cheney
SS	8	Amy Rodriguez	(substituted off) 56'
CF	20	Abby Wambach
Substitutions:
FW	13	Alex Morgan	(substituted on) 56'
MF	15	Megan Rapinoe	(substituted on) 65'
MF	17	Tobin Heath	(substituted on) 87'
Manager:
(Sweden) Pia Sundhage

Player of the Match:
Abby Wambach (United States)

Assistant referees:
Tonja Paavola (Finland)
Anu Jokela (Finland)
Fourth official:
Christina W. Pedersen (Norway)

=== Japan vs Sweden ===
13 July 2011
20:45

Japan	3–1	Sweden
Kawasumi 19', 64'; Sawa 60'	Report	Öqvist 10'

Waldstadion, Frankfurt
Attendance: 45,434
Referee: Carol Anne Chenard (Canada)

Japan	Sweden

JAPAN:
GK	21	Ayumi Kaihori
RB	2	Yukari Kinga
CB	3	Azusa Iwashimizu
CB	4	Saki Kumagai
LB	15	Aya Sameshima
CM	6	Mizuho Sakaguchi
CM	10	Homare Sawa (c)
RW	11	Shinobu Ohno	(substituted off) 86'
AM	8	Aya Miyama	(substituted off) 89'
LW	9	Nahomi Kawasumi	(substituted off) 74'
CF	7	Kozue Ando
Substitutions:
MF	17	Yūki Nagasato	(substituted on) 74'
FW	19	Megumi Takase	(substituted on) 86'
MF	14	Megumi Kamionobe	(substituted on) 89'
Manager:
Norio Sasaki

SWEDEN:
GK	1	Hedvig Lindahl
RB	4	Annica Svensson	(yellow card) 70'
CB	7	Sara Larsson
CB	2	Charlotte Rohlin (c)
LB	6	Sara Thunebro
CM	20	Marie Hammarström		(substituted off) 69'
CM	17	Lisa Dahlkvist
RW	16	Linda Forsberg		(substituted off) 65'
LW	15	Therese Sjögran
CF	8	Lotta Schelin
CF	14	Josefine Öqvist		(substituted off) 75'
Substitutions:
MF	10	Sofia Jakobsson		(substituted on) 65'
FW	9	Jessica Landström		(substituted on) 69'
MF	11	Antonia Göransson		(substituted on) 75'
Manager:
Thomas Dennerby

Player of the Match:
Aya Miyama (Japan)

Assistant referees:
Rita Munoz (Mexico)
Mayte Chavez (Mexico)
Fourth official:
Therese Neguel (Cameroon)

== Third place play-off ==
16 July 2011
17:30

Sweden	2–1	France
Schelin 29'; M. Hammarström 82'	Report	Thomis 56'

Rhein-Neckar-Arena, Sinsheim
Attendance: 25,475
Referee: Kari Seitz (United States)

Sweden	France

SWEDEN:
GK	1	Hedvig Lindahl
RB	4	Annica Svensson
CB	7	Sara Larsson
CB	2	Charlotte Rohlin
LB	6	Sara Thunebro
CM	18	Nilla Fischer (c)		(substituted off) 73'
CM	17	Lisa Dahlkvist
RW	16	Linda Forsberg		(substituted off) 62'
LW	15	Therese Sjögran
CF	8	Lotta Schelin
CF	14	Josefine Öqvist	(red card) 68'
Substitutions:
FW	20	Marie Hammarström		(substituted on) 62'
MF	3	Linda Sembrant		(substituted on) 73'
Manager:
Thomas Dennerby

FRANCE:
GK	16	Berangere Sapowicz	(substituted off) 32'
RB	7	Corine Franco	(substituted off) 84'
CB	4	Laura Georges
CB	2	Wendie Renard
LB	8	Sonia Bompastor
CM	6	Sandrine Soubeyrand (c)
CM	15	Elise Bussaglia
RW	10	Camille Abily
AM	14	Louisa Necib	(substituted off) 32'
LW	17	Gaëtane Thiney
CF	9	Eugenie Le Sommer
Substitutions:
GK	1	Celine Deville	(substituted on) 32'
FW	14	Élodie Thomis	(substituted on) 32'
DF	13	Caroline Pizzala	(substituted on) 84'
Manager:
Bruno Bini

Player of the Match:
Sara Larsson (Sweden)

Assistant referees:
Marlene Duffy (United States)
Veronica Perez (United States)
Fourth official:
Quetzalli Alvarado (Mexico)

== Final ==
17 July 2011
20:45

Japan	2–2 (a.e.t.)	United States
Miyama 81'; Sawa 117'	Report	Morgan 69'; Wambach 104'
Penalties
Miyama (penalty scored); Nagasato (penalty missed); Sakaguchi (penalty scored); Kumagai (penalty scored)	3–1	(penalty missed) Boxx; (penalty missed) Lloyd; (penalty missed) Heath; (penalty scored) Wambach

Waldstadion, Frankfurt
Attendance: 48,817
Referee: Bibiana Steinhaus (Germany)
