= 2011 FIFA Women's World Cup statistics =

Statistics for the 2011 FIFA Women's World Cup

The following article outlines the statistics for the 2011 FIFA Women's World Cup, which took place in Germany from 26 June to 17 July.

Goals scored from penalty shoot-outs are not counted, and matches decided by penalty shoot-outs are counted as draws.

== Goalscorers ==
There were 86 goals scored in 32 matches, for an average of 2.69 goals per match. Homare Sawa of Japan won the Golden Boot award for scoring five goals.

5 goals

- (Japan) Homare Sawa

4 goals

- (Brazil) Marta
- (United States) Abby Wambach

3 goals

- (Sweden) Lisa Dahlkvist

2 goals

- (Australia) Kyah Simon
- (Brazil) Cristiane
- (Brazil) Rosana
- (England) Jill Scott
- (Equatorial Guinea) Genoveva Añonma
- (France) Marie-Laure Delie
- (France) Gaëtane Thiney
- (France) Élodie Thomis
- (Germany) Kerstin Garefrekes
- (Germany) Inka Grings
- (Germany) Célia Okoyino da Mbabi
- (Japan) Nahomi Kawasumi
- (Japan) Aya Miyama
- (Sweden) Lotta Schelin
- (United States) Lauren Cheney
- (United States) Alex Morgan

1 goal

- (Australia) Lisa De Vanna
- (Australia) Leena Khamis
- (Australia) Ellyse Perry
- (Australia) Emily van Egmond
- (Brazil) Érika
- (Canada) Christine Sinclair
- (England) Jessica Clarke
- (England) Ellen White
- (England) Fara Williams
- (England) Rachel Yankey
- (France) Camille Abily
- (France) Sonia Bompastor
- (France) Élise Bussaglia
- (France) Laura Georges
- (Germany) Simone Laudehr
- (Japan) Karina Maruyama
- (Japan) Yūki Nagasato
- (Japan) Shinobu Ohno
- (Mexico) Maribel Domínguez
- (Mexico) Stephany Mayor
- (Mexico) Mónica Ocampo
- (New Zealand) Sarah Gregorius
- (New Zealand) Amber Hearn
- (New Zealand) Rebecca Smith
- (New Zealand) Hannah Wilkinson
- (Nigeria) Perpetua Nkwocha
- (Norway) Emilie Haavi
- (Norway) Elise Thorsnes
- (Sweden) Nilla Fischer
- (Sweden) Marie Hammarström
- (Sweden) Jessica Landström
- (Sweden) Josefine Öqvist
- (Sweden) Therese Sjögran
- (United States) Rachel Buehler
- (United States) Carli Lloyd
- (United States) Heather O'Reilly
- (United States) Megan Rapinoe

1 own goal

- (Brazil) Daiane (against United States)

Source: FIFA

=== Assists ===
Aya Miyama of Japan won the assists table with four assists.

4 assists

- (Japan) Aya Miyama

3 assists

- (United States) Lauren Cheney
- (United States) Megan Rapinoe

2 assists

- (Australia) Collette McCallum
- (Brazil) Marta
- (England) Karen Carney
- (France) Sandrine Soubeyrand
- (Germany) Babett Peter
- (Sweden) Lotta Schelin
- (Sweden) Therese Sjögran

1 assist

- (Australia) Kim Carroll
- (Australia) Lisa De Vanna
- (Australia) Leena Khamis
- (Brazil) Cristiane
- (Brazil) Érika
- (Brazil) Maurine
- (England) Alex Scott
- (England) Jill Scott
- (England) Rachel Unitt
- (England) Rachel Yankey
- (France) Camille Abily
- (France) Eugénie Le Sommer
- (France) Louisa Nécib
- (France) Gaëtane Thiney
- (Germany) Kerstin Garefrekes
- (Germany) Inka Grings
- (Germany) Simone Laudehr
- (Japan) Yukari Kinga
- (Japan) Yūki Nagasato
- (Japan) Shinobu Ohno
- (Japan) Homare Sawa
- (Mexico) Maribel Domínguez
- (Mexico) Dinora Garza
- (Mexico) Verónica Pérez
- (New Zealand) Amber Hearn
- (New Zealand) Ria Percival
- (New Zealand) Ali Riley
- (New Zealand) Kirsty Yallop
- (Norway) Leni Larsen Kaurin
- (Norway) Ingvild Stensland
- (Sweden) Sara Larsson
- (United States) Stephanie Cox
- (United States) Carli Lloyd
- (United States) Alex Morgan
- (United States) Heather O'Reilly
- (United States) Abby Wambach

Source: FIFA Technical Report

== Scoring ==
=== Overall ===
Overall

- Total number of goals scored: 86
- Average goals per match: 2.69
- Total number of braces: 8
  Genoveva Añonma, Cristiane, Inka Grings, Nahomi Kawasumi, Marta (2), Kyah Simon, Gaëtane Thiney
- Total number of hat-tricks: 1
  Homare Sawa
- Total number of penalty kicks awarded: 4
- Total number of penalty kicks scored: 4
  Cristiane, Lisa Dahlkvist, Inka Grings, Marta
- Total number of penalty kicks missed or saved: 0
- Penalty kick success rate: 100%
- Own goals scored: 1
  Daiane

Timing

- First goal of the tournament: Marie-Laure Delie for France against Nigeria
- First brace of the tournament: Marta for Brazil against Norway
- Only hat-trick of the tournament: Homare Sawa for Japan against Mexico
- Last goal of the tournament: Homare Sawa for Japan against United States
- Last brace of the tournament: Nahomi Kawasumi for Japan against Sweden
- Fastest goal in a match from kickoff: 2nd minute

Stephany Mayor for Mexico against New Zealand

- Latest goal in a match without extra time: 90+4th minute

Hannah Wilkinson for New Zealand against Mexico

- Latest goal in a match with extra time: 120+2 minutes
  Abby Wambach for United States against Brazil

Teams

- Most goals scored by an individual: 5
  Homare Sawa
- Most assists provided by an individual: 4
  Aya Miyama
- Most goals and assists produced by an individual: 6
  Marta (4 goals, 2 assists), Homare Sawa (5 goals, 1 assist)
- Most clean sheets achieved by a goalkeeper: 3
  Andréia
- Most consecutive clean sheets achieved by a goalkeeper: 3
  Andréia
- Most goals scored by one player in a match: 3

Homare Sawa for Japan against Mexico

== Wins and losses ==
- Most wins: 5 – Sweden
- Fewest wins: 0 – Canada, Colombia, Equatorial Guinea, Mexico, New Zealand, North Korea
- Most losses: 3 – Canada, Equatorial Guinea, France
- Fewest losses: 0 – Brazil, England
- Most draws: 2 – England, Mexico, United States

== Match awards ==
=== Player of the Match ===
Rank	Name	Team	Opponent	Awards
1	Aya Miyama	Japan	New Zealand (GS), Sweden (SF)	2
1	Homare Sawa	Japan	Mexico (GS), Germany (QF)	2
1	Lotta Schelin	Sweden	United States (GS), Australia (QF)	2
1	Abby Wambach	United States	North Korea (GS), France (SF)	2

=== Clean sheets ===
Rank	Name	Team	Opponent	Awards
1	Andréia	Brazil	Australia (GS), Norway (GS), Equatorial Guinea (GS)	3
2	Ayumi Kaihori	Japan	Mexico (GS), Germany (QF)	2
2	Bérangère Sapowicz	France	Nigeria (GS), Canada (GS)	2
2	Hedvig Lindahl	Sweden	Colombia (GS), North Korea (GS)	2
2	Hope Solo	United States	North Korea (GS), Colombia (GS)	2

== Multiple World Cups ==
Scoring at three or more World Cups

Name	(United States) 2003		(China) 2007		(Germany) 2011		Total goals
Name	Goals	Against	Goals	Against	Goals	Against	Total goals
(Germany) Kerstin Garefrekes	4	CAN, RUS (2), USA	2	ARG, PRK	2	CAN, FRA	8
(Brazil) Marta	3	KOR, NOR, SWE	7	NZL (2), CHN (2), AUS, USA (2)	4	NOR (2), USA (2)	14
(Canada) Christine Sinclair	3	GER, JPN, USA	3	GHA (2), AUS	1	GER	7
(United States) Abby Wambach	3	NGA, PRK, NOR	6	PRK, SWE (2), ENG, NOR (2)	4	SWE, BRA, FRA, JPN	13

Appearing at four or more World Cups

Name	(Sweden) 1995		(United States) 1999		(United States) 2003		(China) 2007		(Germany) 2011		Total
Name	Apps	Against	Apps	Against	Apps	Against	Apps	Against	Apps	Against	Total
(Brazil) Formiga	2	JPN, GER	6	MEX, ITA, GER, NGA, USA, NOR	3	KOR, NOR, SWE	6	NZL, CHN, DEN, AUS, USA, GER	4	AUS, NOR, EQG, USA	21
(Germany) Ariane Hingst	—		4	ITA, MEX, BRA, USA	6	CAN, JPN, ARG, RUS, USA, SWE	6	ARG, ENG, JPN, PRK, NOR, BRA	1	FRA	17
(Nigeria) Stella Mbachu	—		2	USA, DEN	3	PRK, USA, SWE	3	SWE, PRK, USA	3	FRA, GER, CAN	11
(Germany) Birgit Prinz	6	JPN, SWE, BRA, ENG, CHN, NOR	4	ITA, MEX, BRA, USA	6	CAN, JPN, ARG, RUS, USA, SWE	6	ARG, ENG, JPN, PRK, NOR, BRA	2	CAN, NGA	24
(United States) Christie Rampone	—		1	PRK	4	SWE, PRK, NOR, CAN	6	PRK, SWE, NGA, ENG, BRA, NOR	6	PRK, COL, SWE, BRA, FRA, JPN	17
(Japan) Homare Sawa	3	SWE, BRA, GER	3	CAN, RUS, NOR	3	ARG, GER, CAN	3	ENG, ARG, GER	6	NZL, MEX, ENG, GER, SWE, USA	18

== Overall results ==
Bold numbers indicate the maximum values in each column.

=== By team ===
Team	Pld	W	D	L	Pts	APts	GF	AGF	GA	AGA	GD	AGD	CS	ACS	YC	AYC	RC	ARC
Australia	4	2	0	2	6	1.50	6	1.50	7	1.75	−1	−0.25	0	0.00	5	1.25	0	0.00
Brazil	4	3	1	0	10	**2.50**	9	2.25	2	0.50	**+7**	**1.75**	**3**	**0.75**	**7**	1.75	0	0.00
Canada	3	0	0	**3**	0	0.00	1	0.33	7	**2.33**	−6	−2.00	0	0.00	1	0.33	0	0.00
Colombia	3	0	1	2	1	0.33	0	0.00	4	1.33	−4	−1.33	1	0.33	0	0.00	0	0.00
England	4	2	**2**	0	8	2.00	6	1.50	3	0.75	+3	0.75	1	0.25	5	1.25	0	0.00
Equatorial Guinea	3	0	0	**3**	0	0.00	2	0.67	7	**2.33**	−5	−1.67	0	0.00	6	**2.00**	0	0.00
France	6	2	1	**3**	7	1.17	10	1.67	**10**	1.67	0	0.00	2	0.33	5	0.83	**1**	**0.17**
Germany	4	3	0	1	9	2.25	7	1.75	4	1.00	+3	0.75	1	0.25	6	1.50	0	0.00
**Japan**	6	4	1	1	13	2.17	12	2.00	6	1.00	+6	1.00	2	0.33	5	0.83	0	0.00
Mexico	3	0	**2**	1	2	0.67	3	1.00	7	**2.33**	−4	−1.33	0	0.00	2	0.67	0	0.00
New Zealand	3	0	1	2	1	0.33	4	1.33	6	2.00	−2	−0.67	0	0.00	4	1.33	0	0.00
Nigeria	3	1	0	2	3	1.00	1	0.33	2	0.67	−1	−0.33	1	0.33	2	0.67	0	0.00
North Korea	3	0	1	2	1	0.33	0	0.00	3	1.00	−3	−1.00	1	0.33	0	0.00	0	0.00
Norway	3	1	0	2	3	1.00	2	0.67	5	1.67	−3	−1.00	1	0.33	3	1.00	0	0.00
Sweden	6	**5**	0	1	**15**	**2.50**	10	1.67	6	1.00	+4	0.67	2	0.33	6	1.00	**1**	**0.17**
United States	6	3	**2**	1	11	1.83	**13**	2.17	7	1.17	+6	1.00	2	0.33	6	1.00	**1**	**0.17**
Total	32^{(1)}	26	6^{(2)}	26	90	1.41	86	1.34	86	1.34	0	0.00	17	0.27	63	0.98	3	0.05

Team(s) rendered in italics represent(s) the host nation(s). The competition's winning team is rendered in bold.
^{(1)} – Total games lost not counted in total games played (total games lost = total games won)
^{(2)} – Total number of games drawn (tied) for all teams = Total number of games drawn (tied) ÷ 2 (both teams involved)
^{(3)} – As per statistical convention in football, matches decided in extra time are counted as wins and losses, while matches decided by penalty shoot-outs are counted as draws.

=== By confederation ===
Confederation	T	Pld	W	D	L	Pts	APts	Pts/T
AFC	3	13	6	2	5	20	1.54	6.67
CAF	2	6	1	0	5	3	0.50	1.50
CONCACAF	3	12	3	**4**	5	13	1.08	4.33
CONMEBOL	2	7	3	2	2	11	1.57	5.50
OFC	1	3	0	1	2	1	0.33	1.00
UEFA	**5**	**23**	**13**	3	**7**	**42**	**1.83**	**8.40**
Total	16	32^{(1)}	26	6^{(2)}	26	90	1.41	5.63

Host nation(s) are situated in the region(s) rendered in italics.
^{(1)} – Total games lost not counted in total games played (total games lost = total games won)
^{(2)} – Total number of games drawn (tied) for all teams = Total number of games drawn (tied) ÷ 2 (both teams involved)
^{(3)} – As per statistical convention in football, matches decided in extra time are counted as wins and losses, while matches decided by penalty shoot-outs are counted as draws.
