= Hong Myong Hui =

Hong Myong Hui may refer to:

- Hong Myong-hui (1888–1968), Korean novelist
- Hong Myong-hui (footballer) (born 1991), North Korean footballer
