= Rhein-Neckar-Arena =

Multi-purpose stadium in Sinsheim, Baden-Württemberg, Germany

Coordinates: 49°14′17″N 8°53′15″E

SNP Arena

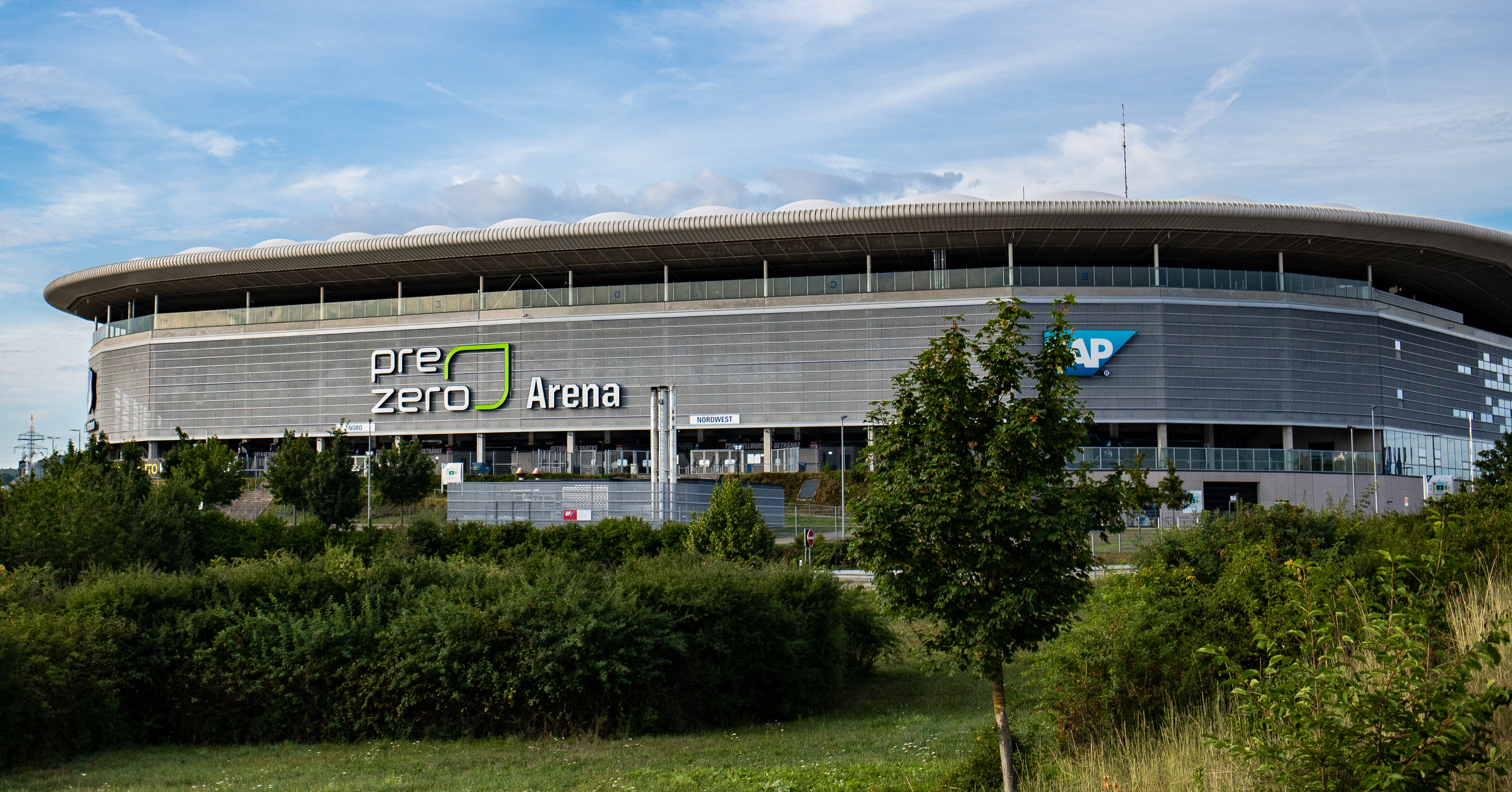
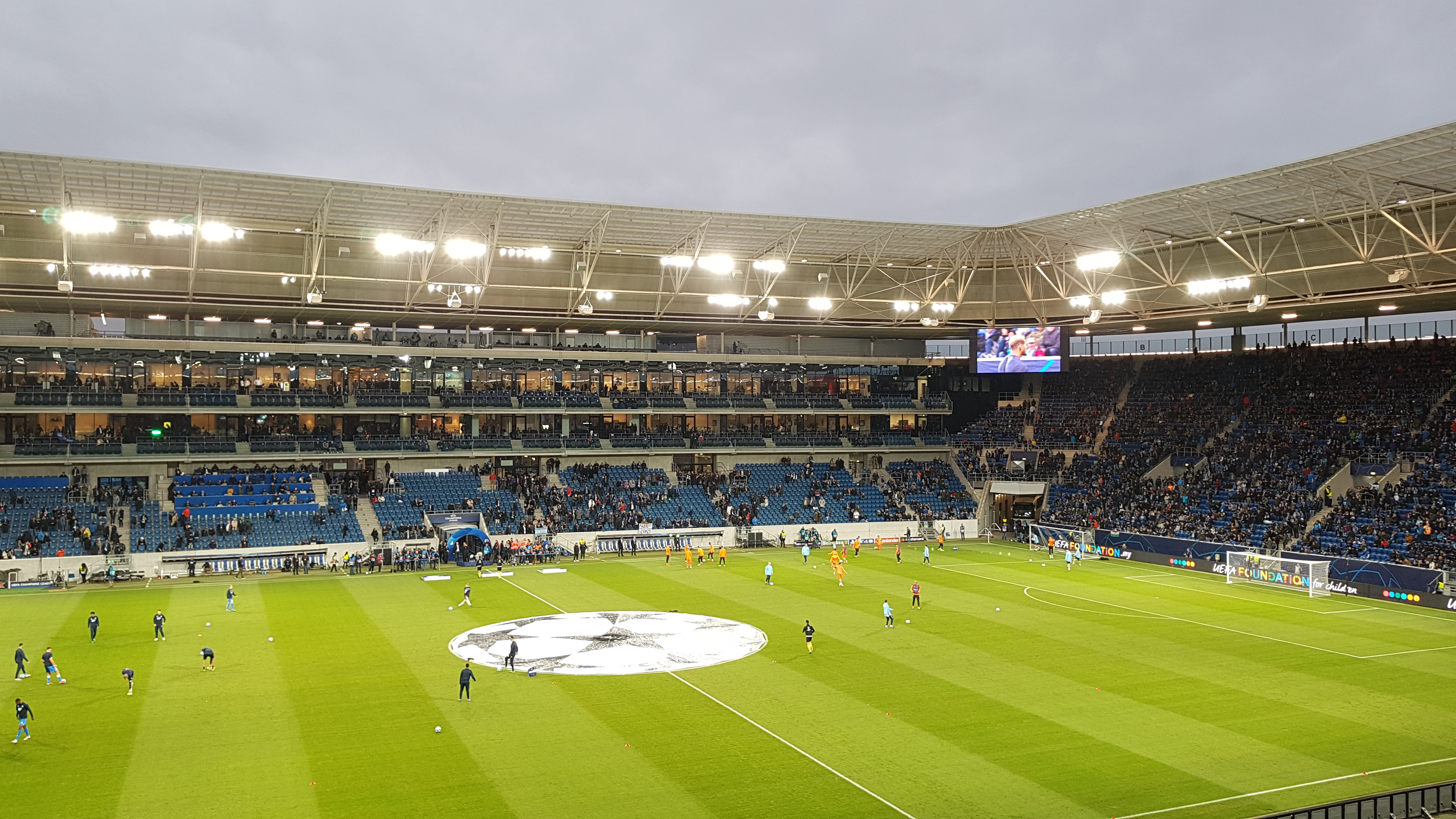
- Interactive map of SNP Arena
- Full name: Rhein-Neckar-Arena
- Location: Sinsheim, Baden-Württemberg, Germany
- Capacity: 30,150 (league matches); 25,589 (international matches)
- Surface: Grass

Construction
- Groundbreaking: 2007
- Opened: 24 January 2009
- Cost: € 60 million
- Architects: Eheim Moebel; Sattler Europe

Tenants
- TSG 1899 Hoffenheim (2009–present); Germany national football team (selected matches)

Rhein-Neckar-Arena (German pronunciation: [ˌʁaɪnˈnɛkaʁʔaˌʁeːna]), currently known as SNP Arena and previously as PreZero Arena and Wirsol Rhein-Neckar-Arena [ˈvɪʁzɔl-] for sponsorship reasons, is a multi-purpose stadium in Sinsheim, Baden-Württemberg, Germany. It is used mostly for football matches and hosts the home matches of TSG Hoffenheim. The stadium has a capacity of 30,150 people. It replaced TSG 1899 Hoffenheim's former ground, the Dietmar-Hopp-Stadion.

The stadium is the largest in the Rhine-Neckar metropolitan area, although it is situated in a town with only 3,600 inhabitants.

The first competitive match was played on 31 January 2009 against FC Energie Cottbus, and ended in a 2–0 win for Hoffenheim. The stadium hosted international matches at the 2011 FIFA Women's World Cup. The Rhein-Neckar-Arena hosted the "2017 DEL Winter Game", an outdoor ice hockey game between Adler Mannheim and the Schwenningen Wild Wings on 7 January 2017.

== Traffic connection ==
The Sinsheim-Museum/Arena S-Bahn stop at the Elsenz Valley Railway (Elsenztalbahn) is just over a kilometre walk away and there are shuttle buses from Sinsheim main station. The stadium can be reached by car via the newly built Sinsheim-Süd junction of the federal motorway 6.

== International football matches ==
Date	Competition	Team	Result	Team	Attendance
9 September 2018	Friendly	Germany	2–1	Peru	25,494
26 March 2022	Friendly	Germany	2–0	Israel	25,600
10 October 2025	2026 FIFA World Cup qualification	Germany	4–0	Luxembourg	25,249

== 2011 FIFA Women's World Cup ==
Date	Time (CET)	Team #1	Result	Team #2	Round	Spectators
26 June 2011	15:00	Nigeria	0–1	France	Group A	25,475
2 July 2011	18:00	United States	3–0	Colombia	Group C	25,475
5 July 2011	18:15	New Zealand	2–2	Mexico	Group B	20,451
16 July 2011	17:30	Sweden	2–1	France	Third Place	25,475

== Gallery ==
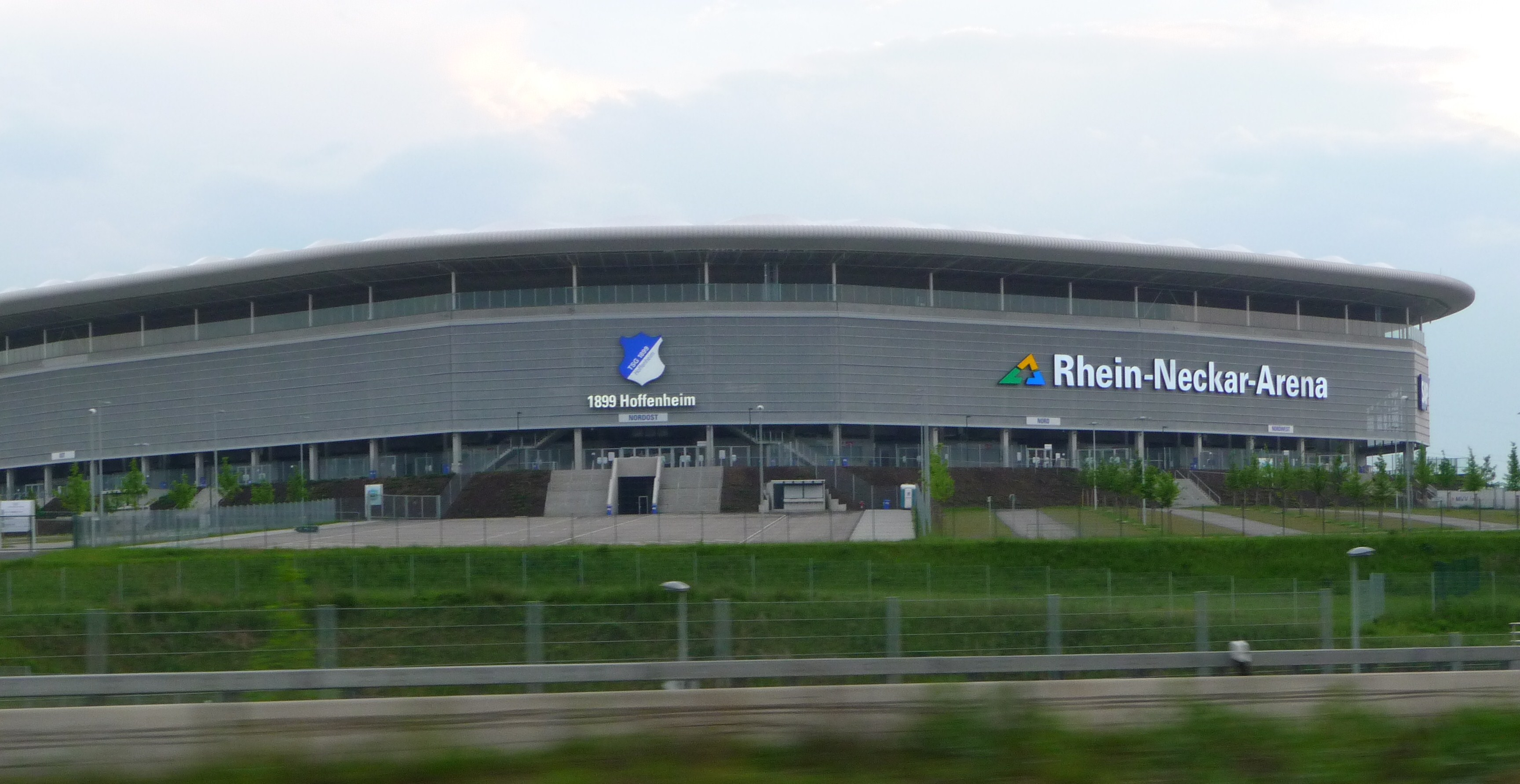

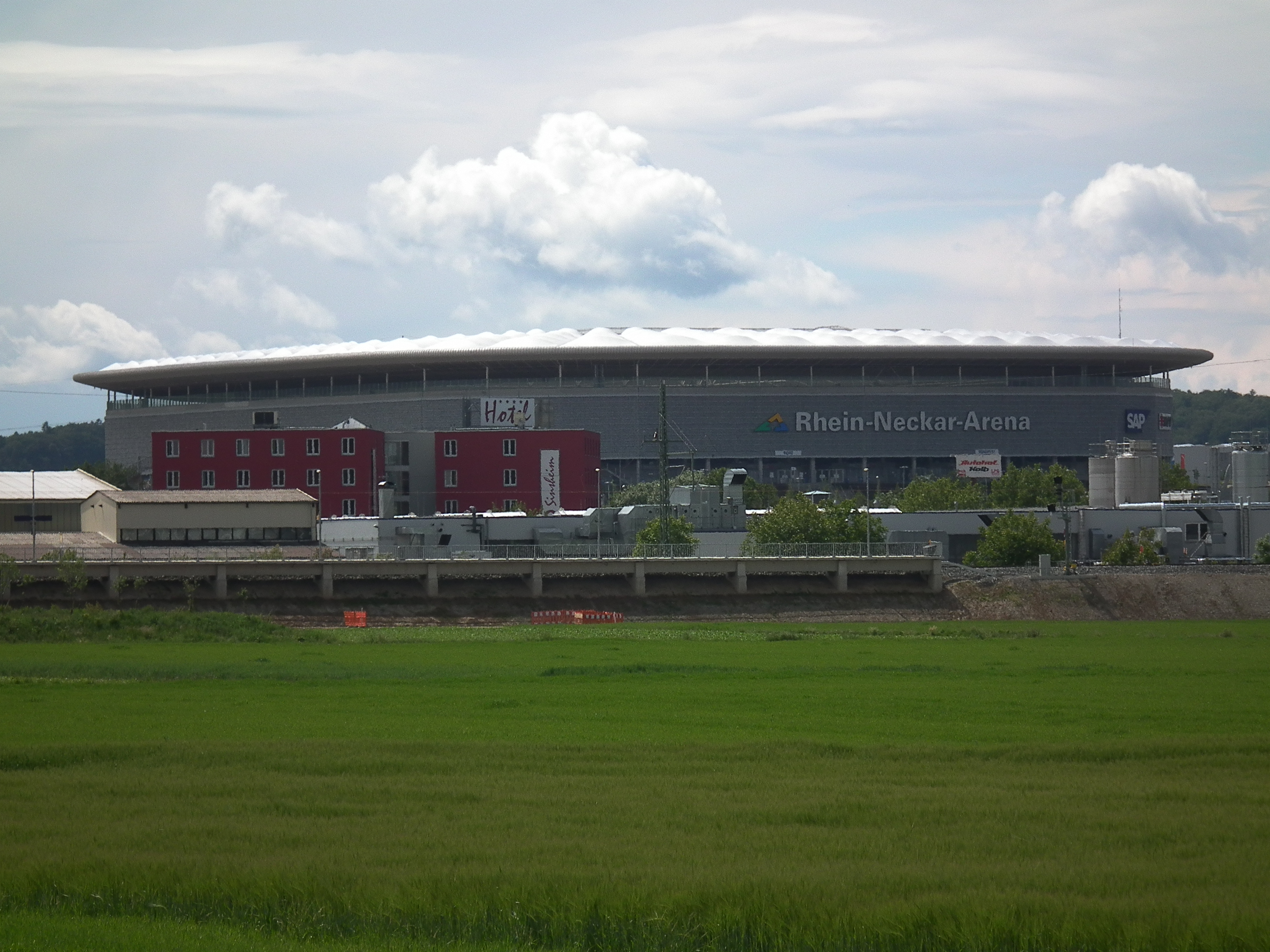

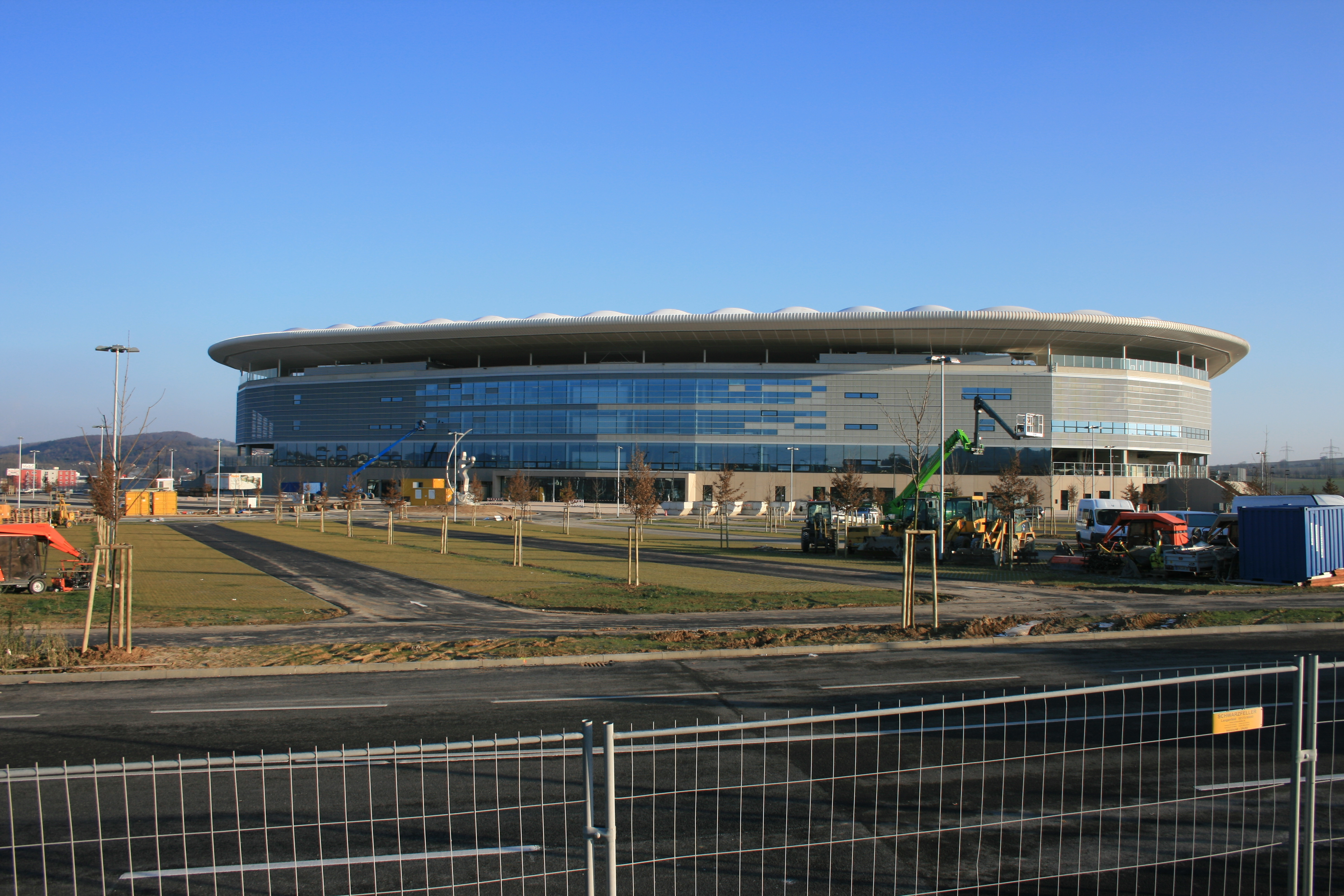

== See also ==
- List of football stadiums in Germany
- Lists of stadiums
