= Paek Sol-hui =

North Korean footballer

Personal information
- Date of birth: 20 March 1994 (age 32)
- Position: Defender

Senior career*
Years	Team	Apps	(Gls)
- 25 April

International career^{‡}
	North Korea	3	(0)
- * Club domestic league appearances and goals ‡ National team caps and goals as of 26 June 2011 (before the 2011 FIFA Women's World Cup)

Paek Sol-hui (born 20 March 1994) is a North Korean footballer who played as a defender for the North Korea women's national football team. She was part of the team at the 2011 FIFA Women's World Cup. At the club level, she played for 25 April in North Korea.
