= Fátima Montaño =

Colombian footballer (born 1984)

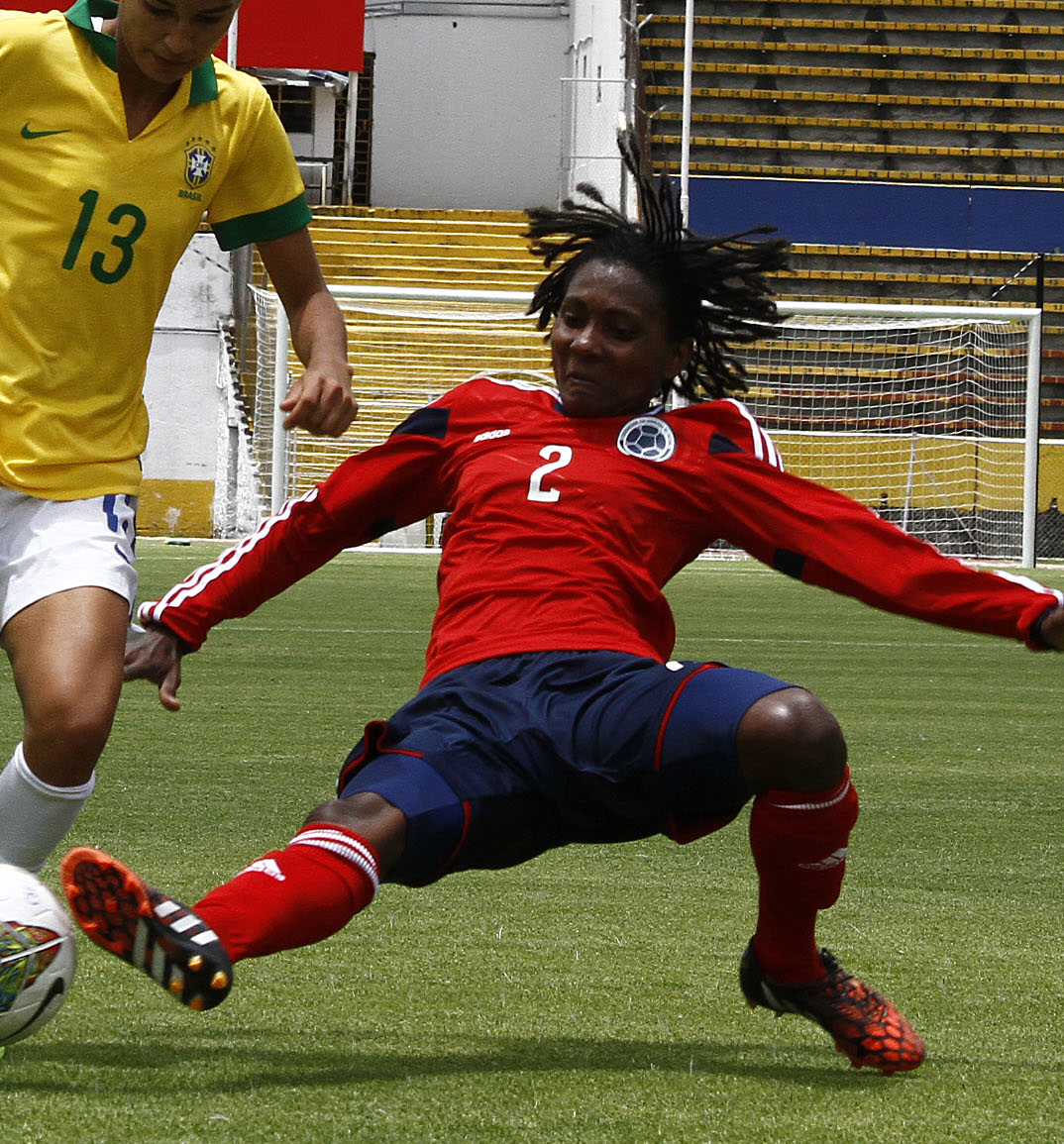
- Montaño in 2014

Personal information
- Full name: Fátima Montaño Rentería
- Date of birth: 2 October 1984 (age 42)
- Place of birth: Colombia
- Height: 1.68 m (5 ft 6 in)
- Position: Left-back

Senior career*
Years	Team	Apps	(Gls)
- Águila

International career^{‡}
	Colombia	3	(3)
- * Club domestic league appearances and goals ‡ National team caps and goals as of 26 June 2011 (before the 2011 FIFA Women's World Cup)

Fátima Montaño Rentería (born 2 October 1984) is a Colombian footballer who plays as a left-back. She has been a member of the Colombia women's national team.

== Club career ==
Montaño played for CD Águila.

== International career ==
Montaño played for Colombia at senior level in the 2011 FIFA Women's World Cup and the 2014 Copa América Femenina.
