= Sinsheim Museum/Arena station =

Railway station in Germany

Sinsheim Museum/Arena
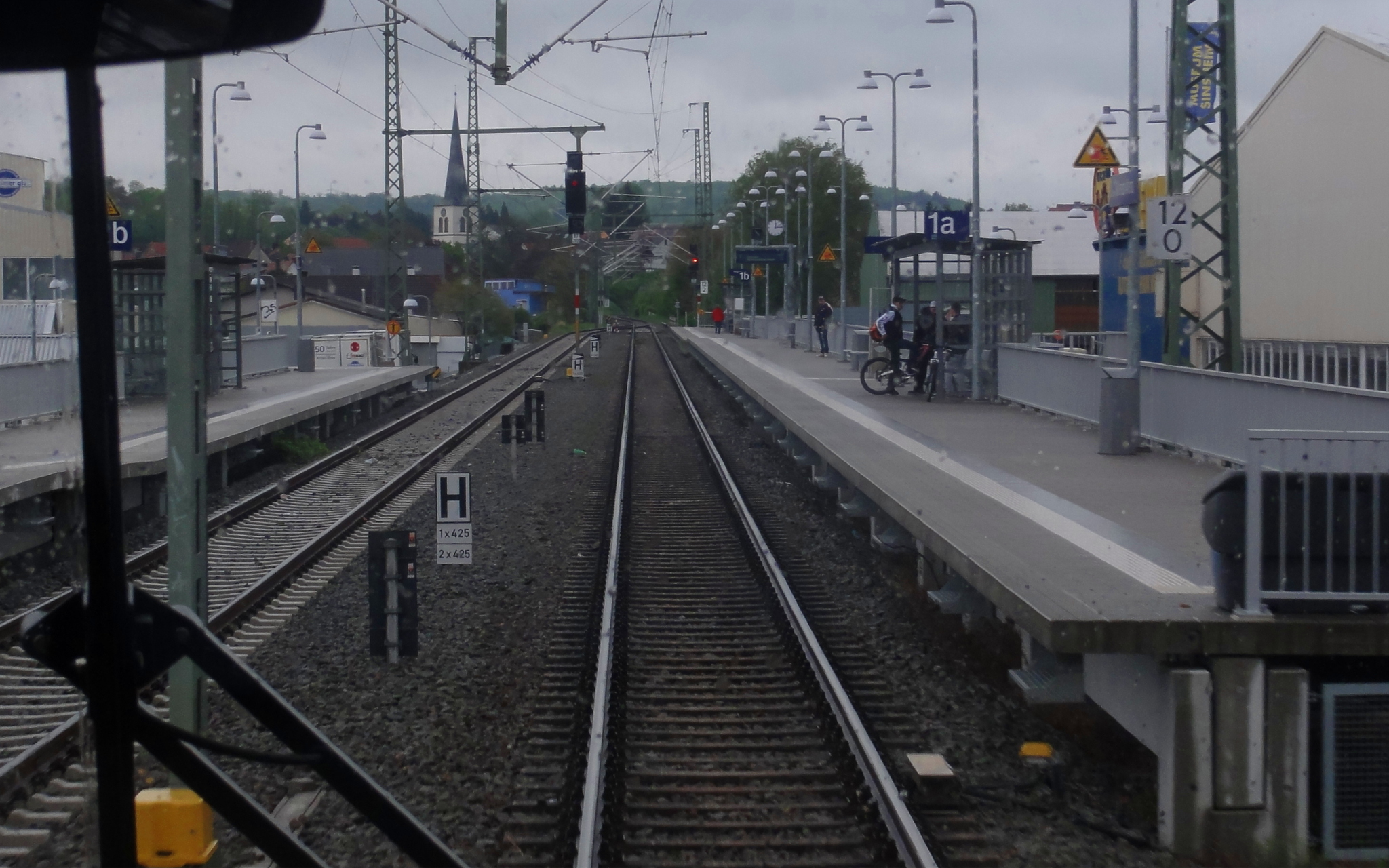
- 2015

General information
- Location: In der Au; Alte Römerstraße; 74889 Sinsheim; Baden-Württemberg; Germany
- Coordinates: 49.2415°N 8.8996°E
- System: Bft
- Owner: Deutsche Bahn
- Operator: DB Netz; DB Station&Service
- Lines: Elsenz Valley Railway (KBS 665.5)
- Platforms: 2 side platforms
- Tracks: 2
- Train operators: Heilbronn Stadtbahn; S-Bahn RheinNeckar
- Connections: S5; S 42

Construction
- Parking: yes
- Cycle facilities: no
- Accessible: yes

Other information
- Station code: 7178
- DS100 code: RSMM
- IBNR: 8070097
- Category: 6
- Fare zone: VRN: 186; HNV: 401 (VRN transitional tariff)
- Website: www.bahnhof.de

History
- Opened: 28 May 1995; 31 years ago

Services
Preceding station	Rhine-Neckar S-Bahn	Following station
Sinsheim (Elsenz) Hbf towards Heidelberg Hbf	S5	Steinsfurt towards Eppingen or Bad Rappenau
Preceding station	Heilbronn Stadtbahn	Following station
Sinsheim (Elsenz) Hbf Terminus	S 42	Steinsfurt towards Heilbronn Hbf
Location
- Location within Baden-Württemberg Location within Germany Location within Europe

Sinsheim Museum/Arena station (German: Bahnhof Sinsheim Museum/Arena) is a railway station in the municipality of Sinsheim, located in the Rhein-Neckar-Kreis in Baden-Württemberg, Germany.

== History ==
On 28 May 1995, the Sinsheim Museum stop was put into operation. In 2011, the now double-track station became a part of Steinsfurt railway station and was renamed Sinsheim Museum/Arena.

== Notable places nearby ==
- Auto & Technik Museum Sinsheim
- PreZero Arena
