= Estela Álvarez =

Argentine football referee (born 1978)

- Born: Estela Álvarez de Olivera; 2 March 1978 (age 48); Oberá, Misiones Province, Argentina
- Other occupation: Physical education teacher

Domestic
Years	League	Role
2004–??	Argentine Football Leagues	Referee

International
Years	League	Role
2005–??	FIFA listed	Referee

Estela Mary Álvarez de Olivera (born 2 March 1978) is an Argentine football referee, who became FIFA-listed in 2005 and the first female referee to lead a game in the men's Primera Nacional in 2009.

== Career ==
Born in 1978 in Oberá, Misiones Province, she had seven brothers and one sister, recalling in interviews the machismo while growing up, citing as an example that after eating an asado on Sundays, her brothers would quickly excuse themselves to go play football, while she and her sister Liliana had to help her mother wash the dishes. Álvarez de Olivera showed great interest in sports and loved football, prompting her to study physical education in Misiones Province.

She moved to Buenos Aires in 2001, after graduating as a PE teacher, to pursue a career as a swimming trainer. In her spare time, she opted for refereeing, enrolling in a preparation course. In 2003, the Argentine Football Association (AFA) took her into the association's training and, beginning in 2004, she began to oversee matches at children's tournaments and AFA's women's football.

In 2005, FIFA designated her as an international referee and made her debut at a CONMEBOL tournament in January 2006 at the South American Women's Football Championship in Argentina. Álvarez subsequently became an Olympic referee when she was appointed for the women's tournament at the 2008 Summer Olympics in Beijing, officiating the bronze medal match between Germany and Japan.

Álvarez's international career included two FIFA Women's World Cups. First in 2007 in China and in 2011 in Germany. In Germany, she oversaw two group stage matches, including the game between Australia and Norway for Group D.

She was the first female referee to lead matches in two male divisions in Argentina: first in 2000 in the Torneo Federal A and in June 2009 in the Primera Nacional (known as B Nacional), Argentina's second division, leading a match between San Martín de San Juan and Independiente Rivadavia.

Álvarez stated in 2006 that she admired three Argentine referees: Héctor Baldassi, Oscar Sequeira, and Horacio Elizondo (who refereed the final of the 2006 FIFA World Cup). Her niece, Antonella, is a referee too, becoming FIFA-listed in 2022.

== Controversy ==
In December 2006, newspaper Perfil published a note alleging that Álvarez had been "benefited" in her refereeing career due to having family in close connection with high-ranking AFA officials, including then President of AFA Julio Grondona. Perfil argued that one of Álvarez de Olivera's brothers, Baldomero, who was mayor of Avellaneda, had a personal friendship with Grondona and that the chief of the school of referees, Abel Gnecco, worked as an employee for the municipality of Avellaneda. The note did not provide any evidence, only pointing to Baldomero's shifting of ideological position from supporting Eduardo Duhalde to joining the ranks of Kirchnerism, of which Perfil was critical at the time.

== Selected record ==
2011 FIFA Women's World Cup – Germany
Date	Match	Result	Round
2 July 2011	North Korea – Sweden	0–1	Group stage
6 July 2011	Australia – Norway	2–1	Group stage
2008 Summer Olympics – Women's tournament – China
9 August 2008	New Zealand – Norway	0–1	Group stage
21 August 2008	Germany – Japan	2–0	Bronze medal match
