= Cristina Cini =

Italian football referee

- Full name: Cristina Cini
- Born: 11 July 1969 (age 57); Florence, Tuscany, Italy

Domestic
Years	League	Role
2002–2012	Serie A / Serie B	Assistant referee

Cristina Cini (born 11 July 1969 in Florence, Tuscany), is the first Italian woman to play the role of assistant referee in Italian professional football.

She made her debut in Serie B in the season 2002–03, assisting referee Antonio Dattilo in Triestina–Venezia (1–2), on 14 September 2002. On 24 May 2003, she debuted in Serie A, assisting referee Tiziano Pieri in Juventus–Chievo (4–3).

On 2 July 2012, she retired, with a total of 43 "assisted" matches in the top flight.
