= Charlotte Rohlin =

Swedish former footballer (born 1980)

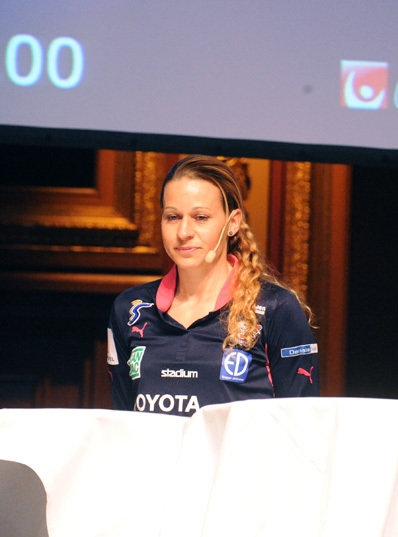
- Rohlin in April 2013

Personal information
- Full name: Barbro Charlotte Rohlin
- Date of birth: 2 December 1980 (age 45)
- Place of birth: Linköping, Sweden
- Height: 1.74 m (5 ft 9 in)
- Position: Defender

Youth career
- 1987–1994: BK Kenty

Senior career*
Years	Team	Apps	(Gls)
1995–2015	Linköpings FC	232	(16)

International career^{‡}
2007–2015	Sweden	77	(7)
Medal record
Women's football
Representing Sweden
FIFA Women's World Cup
Bronze medal – third place	2011 Germany	Team
- * Club domestic league appearances and goals as of 00:48, 18 February 2016 (UTC) ‡ National team caps and goals as of 15:10, 23 June 2015 (UTC)

Barbro Charlotte Rohlin (born 2 December 1980) is a Swedish former footballer who played as a defender and captained Damallsvenskan club Linköpings FC. She won 77 caps for the Sweden women's national football team between 2007 and 2015.

== Club career ==
Rohlin began playing for Linköpings in 1987, while they were still attached to BK Kenty, and progressed up through the youth teams. In 2009 Rohlin rejected an approach from Philadelphia Independence of the American Women's Professional Soccer (WPS), to extend her contract with Linköpings.

She decided to retire from football at the end of the 2015 season, taking a position in the club's marketing department. At the time of her retirement, Rohlin was the player with most appearances for Linköpings with more than 300 matches played in all competitions (232 of them in the league).

== International career ==
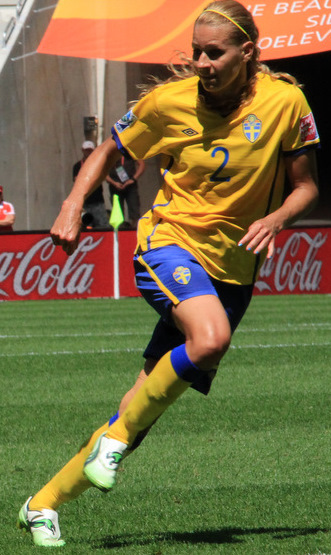
Rohlin at the 2011 FIFA Women's World Cup

At the 2007 edition of the Algarve Cup, Rohlin made her debut for the senior Sweden team in a 3–0 win over Finland. Her first appearance in the squad for a major tournament came at the 2008 Beijing Olympics.

She was selected for UEFA Women's Euro 2009 and scored Sweden's first goal at the tournament, in their 3–0 group stage win over Russia. Rohlin was also part of the team which secured third place at the 2011 FIFA Women's World Cup in Germany. She featured in Sweden's 3–1 semi-final defeat to eventual winners Japan in Frankfurt. Sweden secured third place by beating France 2–1 in Sinsheim.

Rohlin missed the 2012 London Olympics with an anterior cruciate ligament injury. After a year out, she returned to club football in spring 2013 and immediately targeted a place in Sweden's squad for UEFA Women's Euro 2013.

Although selected for the 2015 FIFA Women's World Cup, Rohlin was no longer first choice due to Nilla Fischer's switch to centre-back and the emergence of younger players such as Emma Berglund and Amanda Ilestedt. When Sweden performed poorly and crashed out without winning a game, Rohlin criticised the tactics of coach Pia Sundhage.

Charlotte Rohlin appeared Sweden in one World Cup (Germany 2011) and one Olympic Games (Beijing 2008). She was on the roster for the 2007 and 2015 World Cups, but did not see playing time in either of those tournaments.

Charlotte Rohlin participated in two European Championship tournaments: Finland 2009 and Sweden 2013. She played every minute of both tournaments.

== Career statistics ==
=== International ===
Scores and results list Sweden's goal tally first, score column indicates score after each Rohlin goal.

List of international goals scored by Charlotte Rohlin
No.	Date	Venue	Opponent	Score	Result	Competition	Ref.
	August 25, 2009	Turku, Finland	Russia	1–0	3–0	UEFA Women's Euro 2009	

== Honours ==
Linköpings FC

- Damallsvenskan (1): 2009
- Svenska Cupen (4): 2006, 2008, 2009, 2013–14
- Svenska Supercupen (2): 2009, 2010

Sweden

- Third place at the FIFA Women's World Cup: 2011
