= Thomas Dennerby =

Swedish football coach

Personal information
- Full name: Thomas Lennart Dennerby
- Date of birth: 13 August 1959 (age 67)
- Place of birth: Stockholm, Sweden
- Position: Midfielder

Senior career*
Years	Team	Apps	(Gls)
1977−1985	Hammarby IF	157	(8)
1985−1987	Spårvägens IF		

Managerial career
- Värtans IK
- Spårvägens FF
- 1996−1999: Hammarby IF DFF
- 2001: Hammarby IF (assistant)
- 2002−2004: Djurgården/Älvsjö
- 2005−2012: Sweden (women)
- 2013: Hammarby IF
- 2018−2019: Nigeria (women)
- 2019−2023: India U17 (women)
- 2019−2023: India U20 (women)
- 2021−2023: India (women)
- * Club domestic league appearances and goals

Thomas Lennart Dennerby (born 13 August 1959) is a Swedish football manager. He managed Sweden to a third place finish at the 2011 FIFA Women's World Cup. He last served as the head coach of the India women's football team.

== Career ==
Dennerby, the former coach of the Nigeria women's national football team also known as super Falcons was previously a player in Hammarby IF and Spårvägens IF, as well as the national U21 team. He has also worked as a police officer. As a coach, he won Allsvenskan with Hammarby IF in 2001, and Damallsvenskan with Djurgården/Älvsjö.

Dennerby can be seen in the Sveriges Television documentary television series The Other Sport from 2013.

He became manager of the Nigerian women's national team in January 2018. He resigned in October 2019.

On 9 November 2019, All India Football Federation (AIFF) appointed Dennerby as the head coach of India U17 Women's team which is going to participate in the 2020 FIFA U-17 Women's World Cup as the host of the edition.

Later Thomas Dennerby took charge as Head Coach of the Indian Senior Women's National Team in August 2021.

== Honours ==
=== Individual ===
- Swedish Manager of the Year (women's football) (1): 2004
- CAF Awards - Women's Coach of the Year (nominated)
