= Sarah Ho =

Australian soccer referee (born 1978)

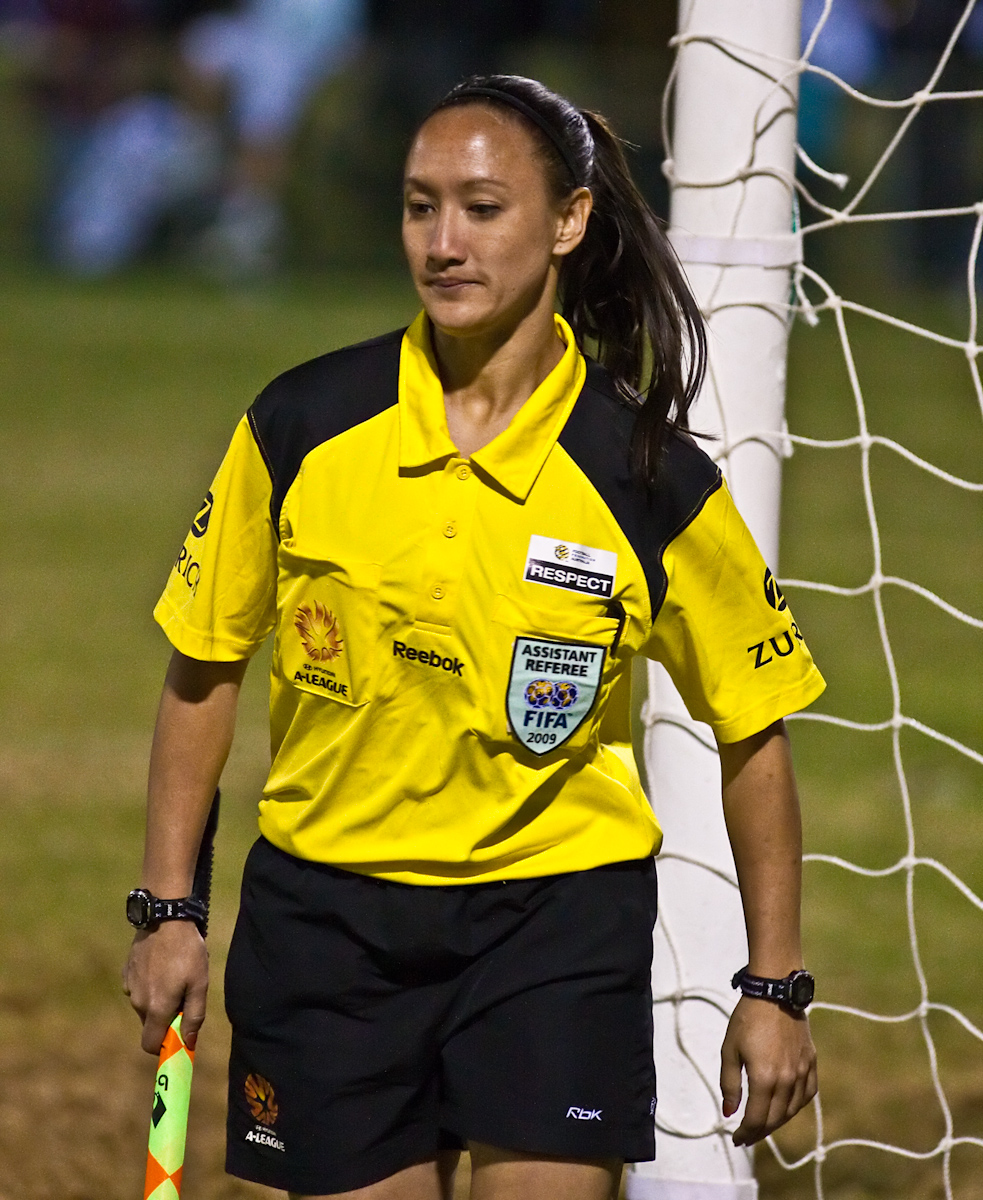
- Full name: Sarah May Yee Ho
- Born: 28 October 1978 (age 47); Australia
- Other occupation: School Teacher

Domestic
Years	League	Role
2007-	A-League	Assistant referee
2008-	W-League	Assistant referee

International
Years	League	Role
2004-	FIFA listed	Assistant referee

Sarah May Yee Ho (born 28 October 1978) is an Australian soccer referee. She has been an assistant referee in both the W-League and the A-League competitions.

Ho officiated at the 2004 FIFA U-19 Women's World Championship, 2006 FIFA U-20 Women's World Championship and the 2007 FIFA Women's World Cup and was one of the assistant referees for the 2011 FIFA Women's World Cup opening game.

She was appointed as an assistant referee for the 2015 FIFA Women's World Cup.
