= Christina Pedersen (referee) =

Norwegian football referee

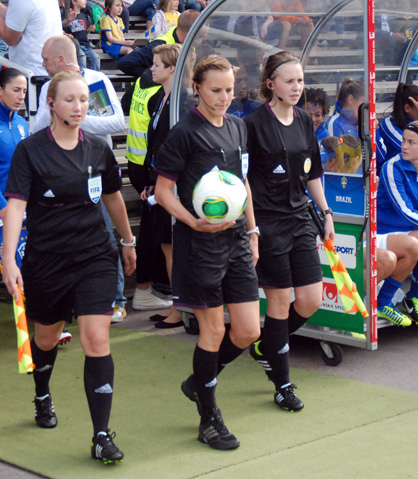
Christina Pedersen (Middle) stepping on the pitch with two other match officials

Christina Westrum Pedersen (born 9 April 1981) is a Norwegian football referee.

She took up refereeing in 1997 and has officiated in the Toppserien since 2005. She resides in Åndalsnes, and represents Åndalsnes IF.

Pedersen officiated at the 2010 FIFA U-20 Women's World Cup, 2011 FIFA Women's World Cup and the 2012 Summer Olympics.

During the 2012 Summer Olympics, Pedersen officiated the semi-final match between Canada and the United States. In the 78th minute, a controversial delay of game call was made against the Canadian goalkeeper, Erin McLeod, when she held the ball longer than the allowed six seconds. The American captain had been audibly counting down the seconds: "...the Americans’ Abby Wambach was in Pedersen’s ear, doing what many players do when their team is losing: audibly counting down the seconds after the opposing goalkeeper gets hold of the ball to pressure the keeper to give up the ball, or the referee to make the six-second call... ...(who said) I got to 10 seconds right next to the referee..." . This violation is rarely called in international play, or at any other level of soccer, and is only intended to be used during instances of clear and deliberate time-wasting. As a result, the American side was awarded a rare indirect free-kick in the box, in the eightieth minute, with Canada leading the match 3–2. On the ensuing play, another controversial handball call was made against the Canadian side, awarding the American team a penalty kick, which Abby Wambach converted to tie the game at 3–3. The Americans went on to win the match in extra time, advancing to the gold medal match. After the match, Canada forward Christine Sinclair stated, "the ref decided the result before the game started." FIFA responded by saying it was considering disciplinary action against Sinclair, but that any disciplinary action would be postponed until after the end of the tournament. Sinclair was eventually suspended for four games.

Pedersen was not selected to referee at any major international competition since the incident.
