= Hong Myong-hui (footballer) =

North Korean footballer (born 1991)

Personal information
- Date of birth: September 4, 1991 (age 35)
- Place of birth: North Korea
- Position: Goalkeeper

Senior career*
Years	Team	Apps	(Gls)
- 25 April

International career^{‡}
	North Korea	9	(0)
- * Club domestic league appearances and goals ‡ National team caps and goals as of 26 June 2011 (before the 2011 FIFA Women's World Cup)

Hong Myong-hui or Hong Myung-hee (Korean: 홍명희; born September 4, 1991) is a North Korean footballer who played as a goalkeeper for the North Korea women's national football team. She was part of the team at the 2011 FIFA Women's World Cup. At the club level, she played for 25 April in North Korea.
