= Sara Larsson =

Swedish footballer (born 1979)

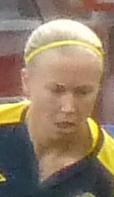
- Sara Larsson in 2011

Personal information
- Full name: Sara Margareta Mattsson
- Birth name: Sara Margareta Larsson
- Date of birth: 13 May 1979 (age 47)
- Place of birth: Kristinehamn, Sweden
- Height: 5 ft 9 in (1.75 m)
- Position: Defender

Senior career*
Years	Team	Apps	(Gls)
–1996	Villastadens IF		
1996–1998	Rävåsens IK		
1998–2004	Malmö FF Dam		
2004–2008	Linköpings FC		
2009	Saint Louis Athletica	15	(0)
2009	→ Linköpings FC (loan)	6	(0)
2010	Philadelphia Independence	11	(0)
2011–2013	KIF Örebro DFF	47	(2)
2014	LB07		

International career^{‡}
	Sweden U-19	7	(1)
	Sweden U-21	12	(5)
2000–2012	Sweden	112	(8)
Medal record
Women's football
Representing Sweden
FIFA Women's World Cup
Bronze medal – third place	2011 Germany	Team
UEFA Women's Championship
Silver medal – second place	2001 Germany	Team
- * Club domestic league appearances and goals as of 15:21, 9 June 2013 (UTC) ‡ National team caps and goals as of 15:21, 9 June 2013 (UTC)

Sara Margareta Mattsson (née Larsson; born 13 May 1979) is a Swedish former football defender who played for KIF Örebro DFF of the Damallsvenskan league. She won 112 caps as a member of the Sweden women's national football team.

== Club career ==
She formerly played for Malmö FF Dam. In November 2008, her Woman's Professional Soccer playing rights were obtained by St. Louis who named her as a post-draft discovery player. She played fifteen games for the team in its inaugural season, then returned to Linköpings for the WPS off-season, during which she was drafted by the Philadelphia Independence in WPS's first expansion draft.

After the 2010 season Larsson returned to Sweden, with KIF Örebro DFF. She signed for Elitettan club LB07 ahead of the 2014 season, but retired in April 2014 due to pregnancy.

== International career ==
Larsson earned over 100 caps for the Sweden women's national football team. She won the rookie of the year (Sweden) in 2000, after making her national team debut in September 2000 in a 2–1 win over rivals Norway.

Sara Larsson featured for Sweden in two World Cups: USA 2003 and Germany 2011. She was also on the roster for the 2007 World Cup, but did not appear in any of Sweden's matches. Larsson played in three Olympic Games: Sydney 2000, Athens 2004, and Beijing 2008.

Sara Larsson appeared at three European Championship tournaments: Germany 2001, England 2005, and Finland 2009.

== Personal life ==
Larsson married Jens Mattsson on 15 August 2015, with whom she already had a son. She subsequently took his surname.

== Career statistics ==
=== International ===
Scores and results list Sweden's goal tally first, score column indicates score after each Larsson goal.

List of international goals scored by Sara Larsson
No.	Date	Venue	Opponent	Score	Result	Competition	Ref.
	August 20, 2004	Volos, Greece	Australia	2–0	2–1	2004 Summer Olympics	
