= 2011 FIFA Women's World Cup =

FIFA Frauen-Weltmeisterschaft Deutschland 2011

Tournament details
- Host country: Germany
- Dates: 26 June – 17 July
- Teams: 16 (from 6 confederations)
- Venues: 9 (in 9 host cities)

Final positions
- Champions: Japan (1st title)
- Runners-up: United States
- Third place: Sweden
- Fourth place: France

Tournament statistics
- Matches played: 32
- Goals scored: 86 (2.69 per match)
- Attendance: 845,711 (26,428 per match)
- Top scorer: (Japan) Homare Sawa (5 goals)
- Best player: (Japan) Homare Sawa
- Best young player: (Australia) Caitlin Foord
- Best goalkeeper: (United States) Hope Solo
- Fair play award: Japan

The 2011 FIFA Women's World Cup was the sixth FIFA Women's World Cup competition, the world championship for women's national football teams. It was held from 26 June to 17 July 2011 in Germany, which won the right to host the event in October 2007. Japan won the final against the United States on a penalty shoot-out following a 2–2 draw after extra time and became the first Asian team to win a senior FIFA World Cup.

The matches were played in nine stadiums in nine host cities around the country, with the final played at the Commerzbank Arena in Frankfurt. Sixteen teams were selected for participation via a worldwide qualification tournament that began in 2009. In the first round of the tournament finals, the teams competed in round-robin groups of four teams for points, with the top two teams in each group proceeding. These eight teams advanced to the knockout stage, where two rounds of play decided which teams would participate in the final.

The hosts and defending champions Germany were eliminated by Japan in the quarter-finals with a 1-0 result in extra time.

== Host selection ==
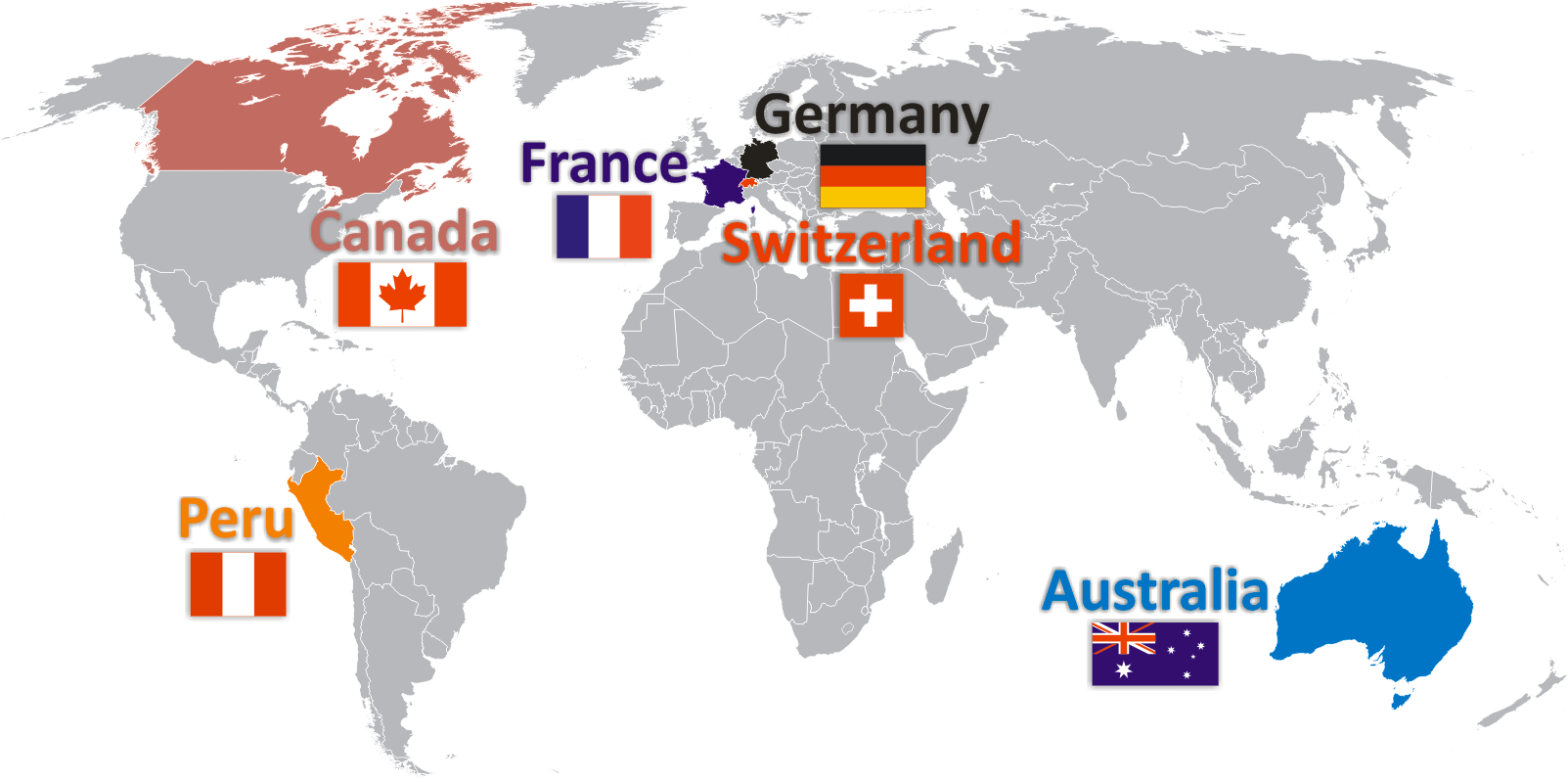
Six original candidates

Six nations, Australia, Canada, France, Germany, Peru and Switzerland, initially declared their interest in hosting the 2011 Women's World Cup. The German Football Association announced its hopes to host the tournament on 26 January 2006, following a pledge from German Chancellor Angela Merkel to fully support a potential bid. All six nations officially announced their interest by a 1 March 2007 deadline and acknowledged their intention of bidding by 3 May 2007 to FIFA.

The final bidding dossiers had to be handed over before 1 August 2007. Switzerland withdrew on 29 May 2007, stating that Europe is heavily focused on France and Germany, and a third European bid appeared futile. On 27 August 2007, France also withdrew, reportedly in exchange for Germany's support for their bid to host the men's UEFA Euro 2016. Later Australia (12 October 2007) and Peru (17 October 2007) voluntarily dropped out of the race as well, leaving only Canada and Germany as the remaining candidates. On 30 October 2007, the FIFA Executive Committee voted to assign the tournament to Germany. Canada was eventually awarded the 2015 Women's World Cup four years later.

Upon the selection, Germany became the third country to host both men's and women's World Cup, having hosted the men's twice in 1974 and 2006.

== Venues ==
After the German Football Association (DFB) expressed its intention to bid for the Women's World Cup, 23 German cities applied to host World Cup games. Twelve cities were chosen for the official bidding dossier handed over to FIFA in August 2007. On 30 September 2008, the DFB executive committee decided to use nine stadiums for the tournament; the original candidates Essen, Magdeburg and Bielefeld were not chosen as World Cup venues.

The official opening game was held between Germany and Canada at the Olympic Stadium in Berlin, the venue of the 2006 men's World Cup final; it was the only match played in Berlin. However, it was not the first match of the tournament—it was preceded by a match at Rhein-Neckar-Arena in Sinsheim pitting France and Nigeria. The final of the tournament took place at the Commerzbank-Arena in Frankfurt, the venue of the 2005 men's Confederations Cup final. Borussia-Park in Mönchengladbach and Frankfurt's Commerzbank-Arena hosted the semi-finals. The third place play-off was held at Rhein-Neckar-Arena.

Since 2007, five of the stadiums were either newly built (Augsburg, Dresden and Sinsheim) or remodelled (Bochum and Leverkusen). Six stadiums would be home grounds for German First Bundesliga clubs in the upcoming 2011–12 season, while the other three would be home to Second Bundesliga clubs in the same season. Compared to the 2006 men's World Cup, several smaller venues were chosen; six stadiums have a capacity of 20,000 to 30,000 seats. All cities would stage a total of four matches, with the exceptions of Berlin and Mönchengladbach; the latter would host three games. The total capacity of the nine venues is roughly 330,000. Overall, approximately one million tickets would be available.

Several of the stadiums were officially referred to simply as "FIFA Women's World Cup Stadium" because FIFA prohibited sponsorship of stadiums unless the stadium sponsors were also official tournament sponsors. With no standing-room terraces allowed, all stadiums had a lower total capacity compared to German Bundesliga games. Capacity data is given according to FIFA:

Berlin	Frankfurt	Bochum	Mönchengladbach	Sinsheim
Olympic Stadium	Commerzbank-Arena (FIFA Women's World Cup Stadium Frankfurt/Main)	Ruhrstadion (FIFA Women's World Cup Stadium Bochum)	Borussia-Park	Rhein-Neckar-Arena
Capacity: 73,680	Capacity: 48,837	Capacity: 20,556	Capacity: 45,860	Capacity: 30,150
Leverkusen	2011 FIFA Women's World Cup (Germany)			Wolfsburg
BayArena (FIFA Women's World Cup Stadium Leverkusen)	2011 FIFA Women's World Cup (Germany)			Volkswagen-Arena (Arena im Allerpark)
Capacity: 29,708	2011 FIFA Women's World Cup (Germany)			Capacity: 26,062
Dresden	2011 FIFA Women's World Cup (Germany)			Augsburg
Glücksgas Stadium (Rudolf-Harbig-Stadion)	2011 FIFA Women's World Cup (Germany)			Impuls Arena (FIFA Women's World Cup Stadium Augsburg)
Capacity: 25,582	2011 FIFA Women's World Cup (Germany)			Capacity: 24,661

== Teams and qualification ==
=== Number of participating teams ===
FIFA had considered the prospect of increasing the number of teams from 16 to 24, to reflect the growing global popularity of women's football and the Women's World Cup. However, on 14 March 2008, the FIFA Executive Committee decided to keep the number of participants at 16, concerned that more teams would dilute the quality of play. The idea of having 20 teams taking part, which had been discussed briefly, was ruled impossible to implement in terms of fixture planning and logistics. During the 2007 Women's World Cup, FIFA president Sepp Blatter had campaigned for the idea to increase the number of teams, although this proposal was not unquestioned. In particular the 11–0 victory of Germany over Argentina in the opening game of the 2007 tournament had caused a debate over whether there were 24 national teams on a comparable level.

=== Confederation allocation ===
In October 2008, the FIFA Executive Committee announced a change to the allocation of the qualifying berths for its continental confederations. Asia was granted 3 automatic berths instead of 2.5 for the finals (although in 2007 the host nation was an additional qualifier from Asia). Europe's allocation was reduced from 5 to 4.5 (although it effectively increased to 5.5 because of the automatic qualification of the host nation). The North/Central American and Caribbean confederation (CONCACAF) retained their 2.5 qualifiers, Africa and South America 2 each, and Oceania 1. The 16th qualifying spot was determined through a play-off between the third-placed team in CONCACAF and the winner of repechage play-offs in Europe.

FIFA also ruled that each confederation has to ensure that at least one third of its member associations enter their women's national teams for World Cup qualification, otherwise FIFA would re-examine the current slot allocation. In Africa and the Middle East a considerable percentage of teams had withdrawn from World Cup qualification in the past.

For European teams, the 2011 Women's World Cup was also used as a qualification tournament for the 2012 Summer Olympics. Besides Team Great Britain, Europe had two additional qualifiers for the Summer Olympics. With Germany losing their quarter-final, France, which had already reached the semi-finals, secured qualification to the Olympics. Sweden followed as UEFA's second team with its win against Australia.

=== Qualified teams ===
Qualification for the tournament took place between April 2009 and November 2010. As the host nation, Germany were granted automatic qualification, while the remaining national teams qualified through their continental confederations. Most confederations used their continental championship tournaments – the AFC Women's Asian Cup, CAF Women's Championship, OFC Women's Championship, Sudamericano Femenino and CONCACAF Women's Gold Cup – to determine qualification. The exception to this was UEFA, which used its own qualifying tournament. One qualification spot was determined by a play-off between a UEFA and CONCACAF team.

The qualified teams, listed by region, with numbers in parentheses indicating final positions in the FIFA Women's World Ranking before the tournament were:

AFC (3)

- Australia (11)
- Japan (4)
- North Korea (8)

CAF (2)

- Equatorial Guinea (61) (debut)
- Nigeria (27)

CONCACAF (3)

- Canada (6)
- Mexico (22)
- United States^{†} (1)

CONMEBOL (2)

- Brazil (3)
- Colombia (31) (debut)

OFC (1)

- New Zealand (24)

UEFA (5)

- England (10)
- France (7)
- Germany (2) (hosts)
- Norway (9)
- Sweden (5)

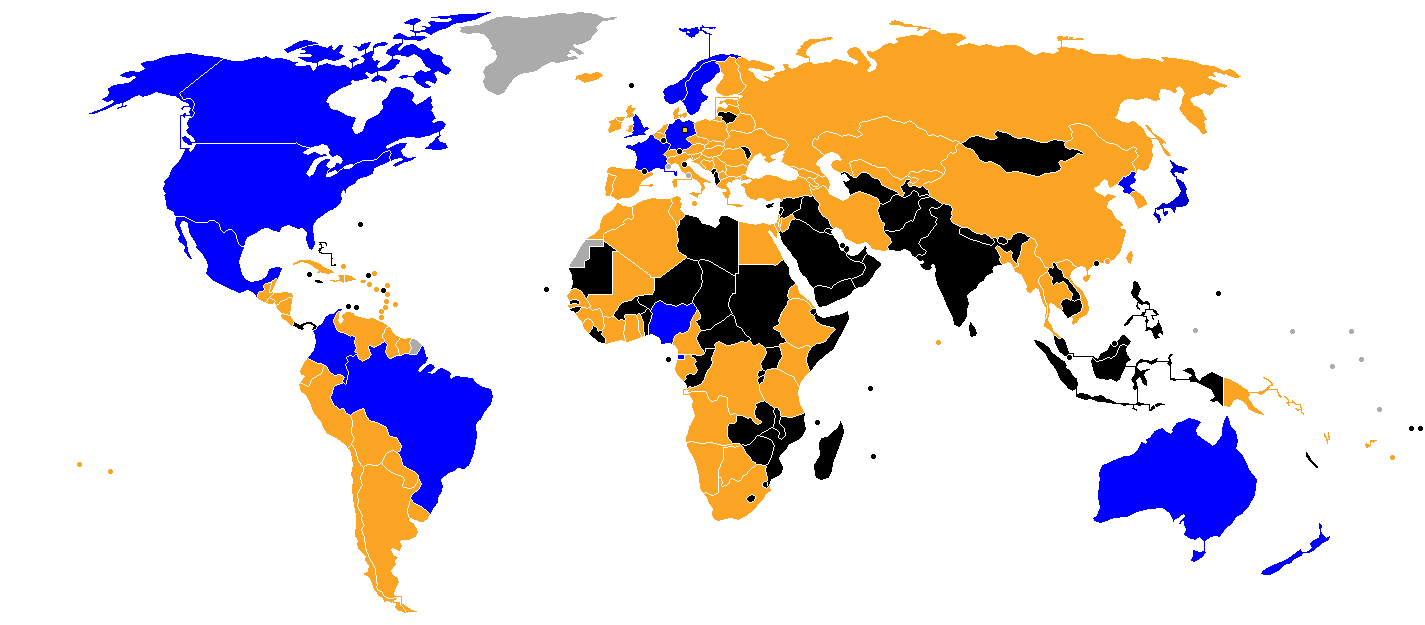
Qualified Failed to qualify / Did not enter Not a FIFA member

† – qualified via a play-off against Italy

Colombia and Equatorial Guinea made their debuts in the FIFA Women's World Cup. Brazil, Germany, Japan, Nigeria, Norway, Sweden and the United States maintained their streak of qualifying for all six tournaments so far, while China failed to qualify for the first time ever. This is Mexico's first appearance since 1999 and France's first appearance since 2003. As of 2027, this is the last time that Equatorial Guinea qualified for the tournament while tournament stalwarts North Korea—who were banned from the 2015 tournament and was inactive from 2019 to 2023 had their last appearance until 2027, as well as the last time the Netherlands, Spain, South Korea, and China (only time) failed to qualify.

== Organization ==
=== Local organising committee ===
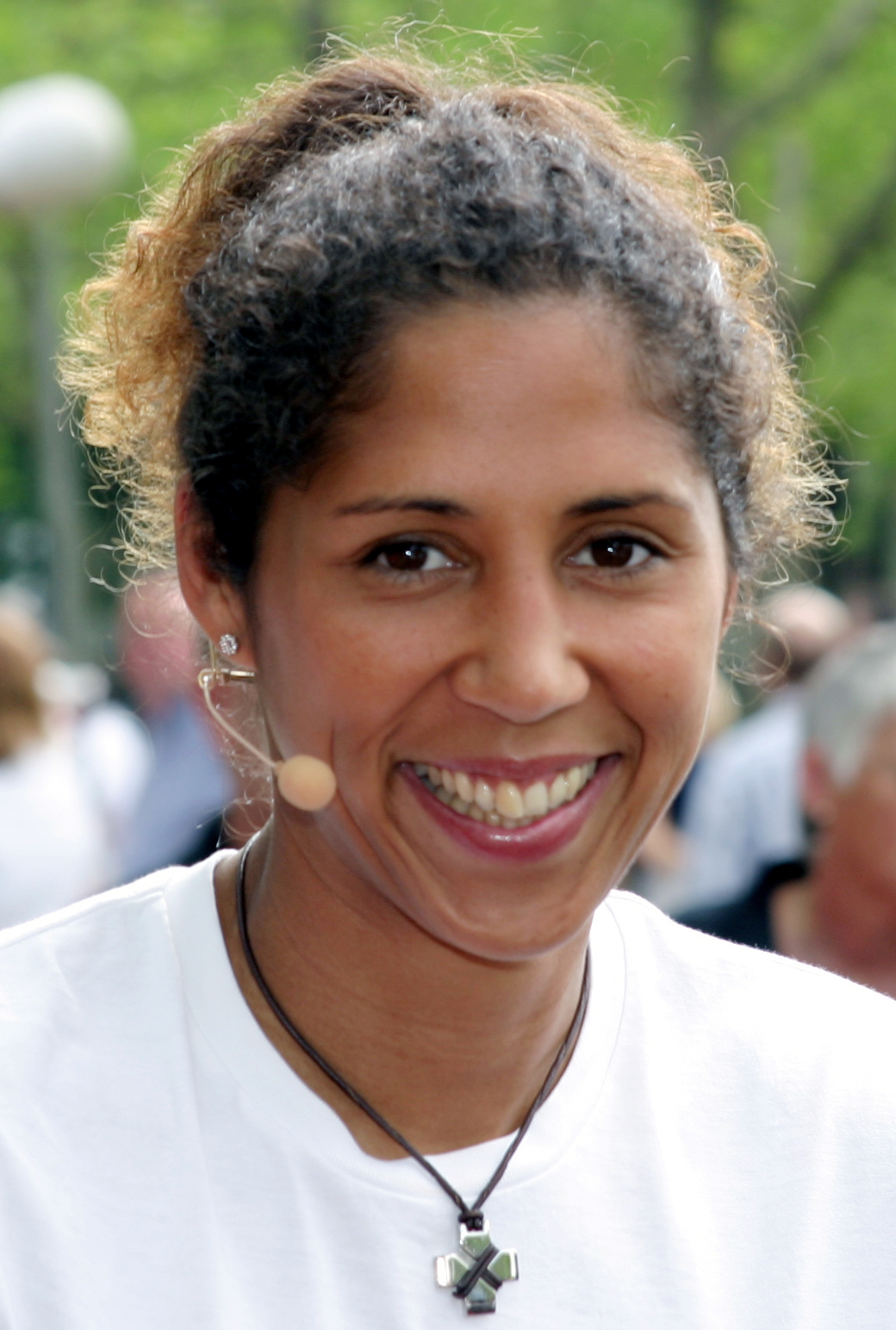
President of Organising Committee, Steffi Jones

The tournament is supervised by the "Women's World Cup 2011 Organising Committee Germany". President of the Organising Committee (OC) is former German international Steffi Jones; she started her work on 1 January 2008. German president Christian Wulff was named the patron of the tournament.

The Organising Committee is chaired by Jones and supervised by the board of the German Football Federation (DFB). On 25 January 2009, Jones opened the committee offices and named her OC team. It is led by managing director Uli Wolter, who headed the Leipzig branch during the 2006 men's World Cup. Aside from Wolter, four department heads were named. Heike Ulrich is responsible for the tournament organisation, former German international Doris Fitschen heads the marketing department, Winfried Naß leads the department "Cities and Stadiums", and Jens Grittner, who served as the press officer for the 2006 Organising Committee, heads the communications department.

Intended to advertise the tournament primarily in Germany, the Organising Committee named four national Women's World Cup ambassadors: former German internationals Britta Carlson, Renate Lingor, and Sandra Minnert, as well as shooting Paralympics gold medallist Manuela Schmermund. In October 2009, former U.S. international Mia Hamm was presented as the World Cup's international ambassador. Each host city except for Berlin also named two city ambassadors. They include footballers Matthias Sammer, Karl-Heinz Riedle and Rainer Bonhof, fencer Britta Heidemann or biathlete Magdalena Neuner.

=== Emblem and mascot ===
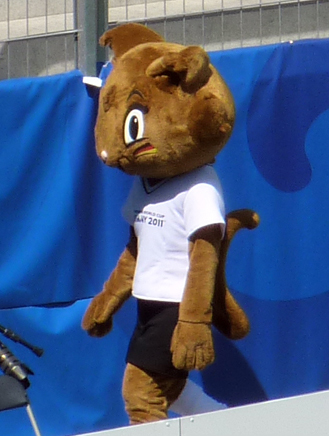
Mascot "Karla Kick"

The official World Cup emblem, called Arena Deutschland, was presented by Steffi Jones and Franz Beckenbauer in the break between the women's and the men's game of the German Cup final on 19 April 2008. It shows a stylised stadium with stripes in the national colours of Germany, black, red and gold, and a pictogram of the Women's World Cup trophy in the upper right corner. It was designed by the Stuttgart advertising agency WVP.

The tournament mascot, cat "Karla Kick", was presented during the opening game of the 2010 Under-20 Women's World Cup on 13 July 2010. The mascot was developed by the Frankfurt agency GMR Marketing. According to Jones, the mascot represents "important attributes of women's football: passion, fun and dynamics".

=== Tickets ===
Approximately one million tickets were available in total, with 900,000 on general sale. 350,000 tickets were offered at discount prices, mainly intended for families, clubs and schools, one of the key target groups of the Organising Committee. As of 22 June 2011, 700,000 tickets have been sold.

The World Cup tickets were offered in several sales phases. During the first sales period from 29 October 2009 to 31 August 2010, only so-called city series tickets were offered. Each city series includes tickets for all games of that particular host city. The prices ranged from €30 to €415. In the second sales period from 17 February to 31 August 2010, so-called 20Eleven tickets were sold to groups of at least 11 people, offered at a 20 percent discount and directed primarily at schools and clubs. Single tickets for all matches were first sold starting 15 September 2010. The prices of individual tickets range from €10 to €200. On 18 March 2011, 100 days before the opening game, the last sales phase started, with all remaining tickets being sold in the order in which orders are received.

Unlike tickets at the 2006 men's World Cup in Germany, the tickets for the Women's World Cup were not personalised. The same city series ticket can be used by different people for different games.

=== Budget and sponsors ===
The tournament's budget has been set at €51 million. The German Football Association plans to cover these costs in almost equal parts from ticket sales and from sponsors, primarily from six so-called National Supporters. In order for the tournament to break even, the DFB has said about 80% of the tickets need to be sold, which would translate to an average attendance of 25,000. The DFB estimates to earn roughly €27 million through the general ticket sale.

From 2008 to 2010, the six National Supporters were presented: the tele-communications company Deutsche Telekom, the bank Commerzbank, the insurer Allianz, the retailer Rewe, the national mail company Deutsche Post and the national railway company Deutsche Bahn. Aside from Deutsche Bahn, the sponsors are identical with those of the 2010 U-20 Women's World Cup.

=== Media coverage ===
The television coverage of the tournament was unprecedented. For the first time, all matches were produced in high definition, with in-goal cameras and two steadicams being used for all matches. For selected matches, the broadcast production comprised up to 18 cameras, including a spidercam and a helicopter camera.

In Germany the public broadcasters ARD and ZDF showed all 32 tournament games live. Across Europe, all games were available on Eurosport in 34 countries and territories. In the United States, ESPN and ESPN2 served as the official English-language broadcaster, while Univision carried coverage in Spanish. In Canada, CBC Television and Sportsnet broadcast the tournament; the event was the first in a sub-licensing partnership for FIFA tournaments between the two networks. In the United Kingdom, the games of the England national team were shown live by BBC Red Button and the BBC Sport website. The final was shown live on BBC Three. SBS held the broadcasting rights for Australia, while Al Jazeera broadcast matches in the Middle East and North Africa.

The tournament was the first women's event to be the subject of a Panini sticker album, available only in Germany.

The final match between Japan and the United States broke the record for most tweets per second on Twitter – 7,196.

== Match officials ==
FIFA's Referees' Committee selected 16 referees to officiate at the World Cup: three from the AFC, one from the CAF, two from CONMEBOL, three from CONCACAF, one from the OFC and six from UEFA. In addition 32 assistant referees and three fourth officials were selected. The oldest referee was 42-year-old Swede Jenny Palmquist, while the youngest referee was 29-year-old Finau Vulvuli of Fiji.

Referees
Confederation	Referee
AFC	Cha Sung-mi (South Korea)
AFC	Etsuko Fukano (Japan)
AFC	Jacqui Melksham (Australia)
CAF	Thérèse Neguel (Cameroon)
CONCACAF	Quetzalli Alvarado (Mexico)
CONCACAF	Carol Anne Chenard (Canada)
CONCACAF	Kari Seitz (United States)
CONMEBOL	Estela Álvarez (Argentina)
CONMEBOL	Silvia Reyes (Peru)
OFC	Finau Vulivuli (Fiji)
UEFA	Dagmar Damková (Czech Republic)
UEFA	Gyöngyi Gaál (Hungary)
UEFA	Kirsi Heikkinen (Finland)
UEFA	Jenny Palmqvist (Sweden)
UEFA	Christina Pedersen (Norway)
UEFA	Bibiana Steinhaus (Germany)

Fourth officials
Confederation	Referee
UEFA	Thalia Mitsi (Greece)
UEFA	Kateryna Monzul (Ukraine)
UEFA	Esther Staubli (Switzerland)

Assistant referees
Confederation	Assistant referee
AFC	Allyson Flynn (Australia)
AFC	Sarah Ho (Australia)
AFC	Kim Kyoung-min (South Korea)
AFC	Zhang Lingling (China)
AFC	Saori Takahashi (Japan)
AFC	Widiya Habibah Shamsuri (Malaysia)
CAF	Tempa Ndah (Benin)
CAF	Lidwine Rakotozafinoro (Madagascar)
CONCACAF	Emperatriz Ayala (El Salvador)
CONCACAF	Mayte Chávez (Mexico)
CONCACAF	Marlene Duffy (United States)
CONCACAF	Cindy Mohammed (Trinidad and Tobago)
CONCACAF	Rita Muñoz (Mexico)
CONCACAF	Veronica Perez (United States)
CONMEBOL	Mariana Corbo (Uruguay)
CONMEBOL	Yoli García (Venezuela)
CONMEBOL	Marlene Leyton (Peru)
CONMEBOL	María Rocco (Argentina)
OFC	Jacqueline Stephenson (New Zealand)
OFC	Lata Tuifutuna (Tonga)
UEFA	Cristina Cini (Italy)
UEFA	Anu Jokela (Finland)
UEFA	Helen Caro (Sweden)
UEFA	Anna Nyström (Sweden)
UEFA	Tonja Paavola (Finland)
UEFA	Yolanda Parga Rodríguez (Spain)
UEFA	Katrin Rafalski (Germany)
UEFA	Lada Rojc (Croatia)
UEFA	Hege Lanes Steinlund (Norway)
UEFA	María Luisa Villa Gutiérrez (Spain)
UEFA	Natalie Walker (England)
UEFA	Marina Wozniak (Germany)

== Squads ==
As with the 2007 tournament, each team's squad for the 2011 Women's World Cup consisted of 21 players, two less than men's World Cup squads. Each participating national association had to confirm their final 21-player squad no later than 10 working days before the start of the tournament. Replacement of seriously injured players was permitted until 24 hours before the team in question's first World Cup game.

=== Doping cases ===
On 25 June 2011 the A sample of Yineth Varón, goalkeeper of Colombia, tested positive to an as yet unknown substance. She was provisionally suspended by the FIFA until the B sample result was known. On 25 August 2011, it was confirmed that she had received a two-year ban.

On 7 July 2011, FIFA announced that two players from North Korea, Song Jong-Sun and Jong Pok-Sim, were provisionally suspended prior to their team's match against Colombia after failing doping tests during the tournament. On 16 July, FIFA announced that three additional players (Hong Myong-Hui, Ho Un-Byol and Ri Un-Hyang) from North Korea tested positive following target testing of the whole team. On 25 August 2011, the Korean team was fined US$400,000, which is equal to the prize it received by finishing 13th in the 2011 tournament, and was excluded from participation at the 2015 FIFA Women's World Cup.

== Final draw ==
The Organising Committee approved the procedure for the final draw on 28 November 2010. Four teams from different geographic regions – Germany, Japan, United States, Brazil – were seeded based on their FIFA Women's World Rankings. No two teams from the same confederation were to be drawn in the same group, with the exception of Group A, which would include two European teams.

Pot 1	Pot 2	Pot 3	Pot 4
Germany (A1); Japan (B1); United States (C1); Brazil (D1)	Australia; North Korea; Canada; Mexico	Nigeria; Equatorial Guinea; New Zealand; Colombia	England; France; Sweden; Norway

Comments

Pot 1: The groups of the four seeded teams were predetermined before the draw.

Pot 2: Australia and Korea DPR cannot be drawn against fellow AFC qualifier Japan in Group B. Similarly, Canada and Mexico cannot be drawn against the other CONCACAF qualifier (the United States) in Group C.

Pot 3: To avoid two CONMEBOL teams being drawn into Group D, if Colombia were not the first team drawn from Pot 3 then the side drawn would be placed directly into Group D.

Pot 4: Group A would be the group with two European teams.

The group draw was staged in Frankfurt, Germany, on 29 November 2010 at the Congress Centrum. The ceremony was presented by Organising Committee president Steffi Jones, assisted by FIFA Head of Women's Competitions Tatjana Haenni. The balls were drawn by former German international Günter Netzer and Slovak model and women's football ambassador Adriana Karembeu.

Group A was the group of death of this FIFA World Cup with three top 10-ranked teams: Germany (2), Canada (6) and France (7).

== Group stage ==
The first round, or group stage, sees the sixteen teams divided into four groups of four teams. Each group is a round-robin of six games, where each team plays one match against each of the other teams in the same group. Teams are awarded three points for a win, one point for a draw and none for a defeat. The teams finishing first and second in each group qualifies for the quarter-finals.

The match schedule for the tournament was released on 20 March 2009, with the hosts placed in position A1. Unlike previous Women's World Cup final tournaments, there were no double-headers, but matches on the same day were held in different venues. According to the Organising Committee, this "signals the increased quality and status of the women's finals".

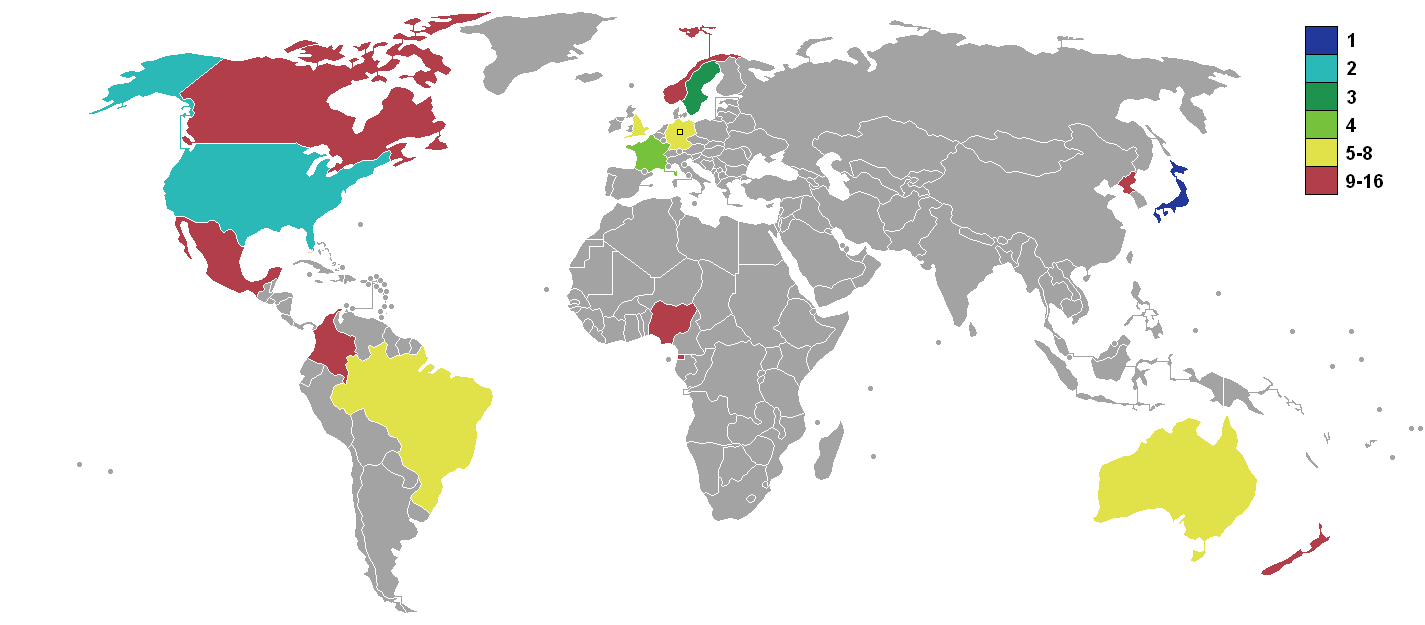
Qualified countries' results

All times are in the CEST time zone (UTC+2).

Tie-breaking criteria for group play
The ranking of teams in the group stage was determined as follows:
1. Points obtained in all group matches (three points for a win, one for a draw, none for a defeat);
2. Goal difference in all group matches;
3. Number of goals scored in all group matches;
4. Points obtained in the matches played between the teams in question;
5. Goal difference in the matches played between the teams in question;
6. Number of goals scored in the matches played between the teams in question;
7. Fair play criteria based on yellow and red cards received;
8. Drawing of lots.

=== Group A ===
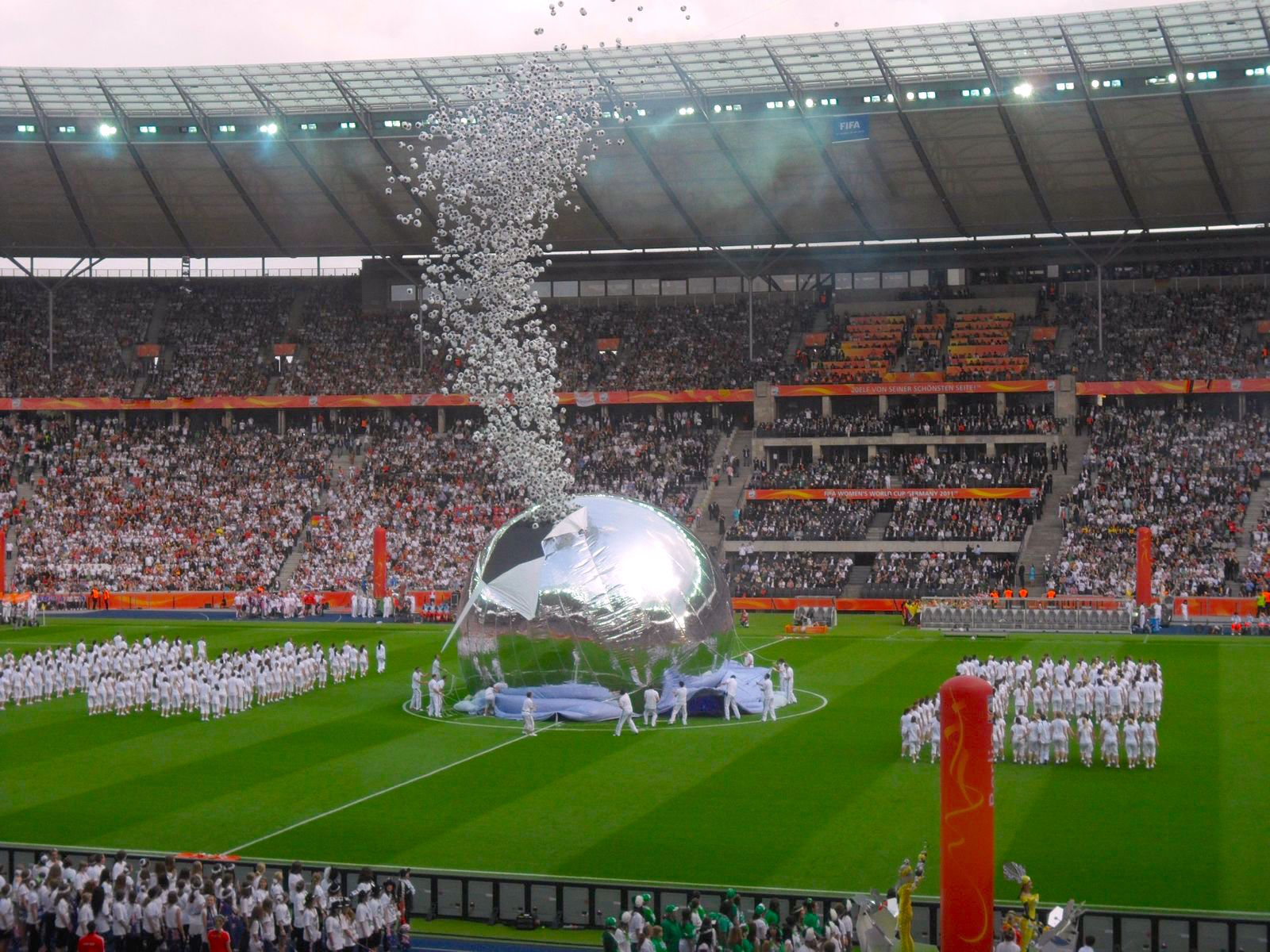
Opening ceremony.

Pos	Team	Pld	W	D	L	GF	GA	GD	Pts	Qualification
1	Germany (H)	3	3	0	0	7	3	+4	9	Advance to knockout stage
2	France	3	2	0	1	7	4	+3	6	Advance to knockout stage
3	Nigeria	3	1	0	2	1	2	−1	3	
4	Canada	3	0	0	3	1	7	−6	0	

Source: FIFA
(H) Hosts
26 June 2011
15:00

Nigeria	0–1	France
	Report	Delie 56'

Rhein-Neckar-Arena, Sinsheim
Attendance: 25,475
Referee: Kari Seitz (United States)
26 June 2011
18:00

Germany	2–1	Canada
Garefrekes 10'; Okoyino da Mbabi 42'	Report	Sinclair 82'

Olympiastadion, Berlin
Attendance: 73,680
Referee: Jacqui Melksham (Australia)

30 June 2011
18:00

Canada	0–4	France
	Report	Thiney 24', 60'; Abily 66'; Thomis 83'

Ruhrstadion, Bochum
Attendance: 16,591
Referee: Etsuko Fukano (Japan)
30 June 2011
20:45

Germany	1–0	Nigeria
Laudehr 54'	Report

Waldstadion, Frankfurt
Attendance: 48,817
Referee: Cha Sung-mi (South Korea)

5 July 2011
20:45

France	2–4	Germany
Delie 56'; Georges 72'	Report	Garefrekes 25'; Grings 32', 68' (pen.); Okoyino da Mbabi 89'

Borussia-Park, Mönchengladbach
Attendance: 45,867
Referee: Kirsi Heikkinen (Finland)
5 July 2011
20:45

Canada	0–1	Nigeria
	Report	Nkwocha 73'

Rudolf-Harbig-Stadion, Dresden
Attendance: 13,638
Referee: Finau Vulivuli (Fiji)

=== Group B ===
Pos	Team	Pld	W	D	L	GF	GA	GD	Pts	Qualification
1	England	3	2	1	0	5	2	+3	7	Advance to knockout stage
2	Japan	3	2	0	1	6	3	+3	6	Advance to knockout stage
3	Mexico	3	0	2	1	3	7	−4	2	
4	New Zealand	3	0	1	2	4	6	−2	1	

Source: FIFA
27 June 2011
15:00

Japan	2–1	New Zealand
Nagasato 6'; Miyama 68'	Report	Hearn 12'

Ruhrstadion, Bochum
Attendance: 12,538
Referee: Kirsi Heikkinen (Finland)
27 June 2011
18:00

Mexico	1–1	England
Ocampo 33'	Report	Williams 21'

Volkswagen Arena, Wolfsburg
Attendance: 18,702
Referee: Silvia Reyes (Peru)

1 July 2011
15:00

Japan	4–0	Mexico
Sawa 13', 39', 80'; Ohno 15'	Report

BayArena, Leverkusen
Attendance: 22,291
Referee: Christina Pedersen (Norway)
1 July 2011
18:15

New Zealand	1–2	England
Gregorius 18'	Report	J. Scott 63'; Clarke 81'

Rudolf-Harbig-Stadion, Dresden
Attendance: 19,110
Referee: Thérèse Neguel (Cameroon)

5 July 2011
18:15

England	2–0	Japan
E. White 15'; Yankey 66'	Report

Impuls Arena, Augsburg
Attendance: 20,777
Referee: Carol Anne Chenard (Canada)
5 July 2011
18:15

New Zealand	2–2	Mexico
Smith 90'; Wilkinson 90+4'	Report	Mayor 2'; Domínguez 29'

Rhein-Neckar-Arena, Sinsheim
Attendance: 20,451
Referee: Jenny Palmqvist (Sweden)

=== Group C ===
Pos	Team	Pld	W	D	L	GF	GA	GD	Pts	Qualification
1	Sweden	3	3	0	0	4	1	+3	9	Advance to knockout stage
2	United States	3	2	0	1	6	2	+4	6	Advance to knockout stage
3	North Korea	3	0	1	2	0	3	−3	1	
4	Colombia	3	0	1	2	0	4	−4	1	

Source: FIFA
28 June 2011
15:00

Colombia	0–1	Sweden
	Report	Landström 57'

BayArena, Leverkusen
Attendance: 21,106
Referee: Carol Anne Chenard (Canada)
28 June 2011
18:15

United States	2–0	North Korea
Cheney 54'; Buehler 76'	Report

Rudolf-Harbig-Stadion, Dresden
Attendance: 21,859
Referee: Bibiana Steinhaus (Germany)

2 July 2011
14:00

North Korea	0–1	Sweden
	Report	Dahlkvist 64'

Impuls Arena, Augsburg
Attendance: 23,768
Referee: Estela Álvarez (Argentina)
2 July 2011
18:00

United States	3–0	Colombia
O'Reilly 12'; Rapinoe 50'; Lloyd 57'	Report

Rhein-Neckar-Arena, Sinsheim
Attendance: 25,475
Referee: Dagmar Damková (Czech Republic)

6 July 2011
20:45

Sweden	2–1	United States
Dahlkvist 16' (pen.); LePeilbet 35' (o.g.)	Report	Wambach 67'

Volkswagen Arena, Wolfsburg
Attendance: 23,468
Referee: Etsuko Fukano (Japan)
6 July 2011
20:45

North Korea	0–0	Colombia
	Report

Ruhrstadion, Bochum
Attendance: 7,805
Referee: Christina Pedersen (Norway)

=== Group D ===
Pos	Team	Pld	W	D	L	GF	GA	GD	Pts	Qualification
1	Brazil	3	3	0	0	7	0	+7	9	Advance to knockout stage
2	Australia	3	2	0	1	5	4	+1	6	Advance to knockout stage
3	Norway	3	1	0	2	2	5	−3	3	
4	Equatorial Guinea	3	0	0	3	2	7	−5	0	

Source: FIFA
29 June 2011
15:00

Norway	1–0	Equatorial Guinea
Haavi 84'	Report

Impuls Arena, Augsburg
Attendance: 12,928
Referee: Quetzalli Alvarado (Mexico)
29 June 2011
18:15

Brazil	1–0	Australia
Rosana 54'	Report

Borussia-Park, Mönchengladbach
Attendance: 27,258
Referee: Jenny Palmqvist (Sweden)

3 July 2011
14:00

Australia	3–2	Equatorial Guinea
Khamis 8'; Van Egmond 48'; De Vanna 51'	Report	Añonman 21', 83'

Ruhrstadion, Bochum
Attendance: 15,640
Referee: Gyöngyi Gaál (Hungary)
3 July 2011
18:15

Brazil	3–0	Norway
Marta 22', 48'; Rosana 46'	Report

Volkswagen Arena, Wolfsburg
Attendance: 26,067
Referee: Kari Seitz (United States)

6 July 2011
18:00

Equatorial Guinea	0–3	Brazil
	Report	Érika 49'; Cristiane 54', 90+3' (pen.)

Waldstadion, Frankfurt
Attendance: 35,859
Referee: Bibiana Steinhaus (Germany)
6 July 2011
18:00

Australia	2–1	Norway
Simon 57', 87'	Report	Thorsnes 56'

BayArena, Leverkusen
Attendance: 18,474
Referee: Estela Álvarez (Argentina)

== Knockout stage ==
The knockout stage comprised the eight teams that advanced from the group stage of the tournament. There were three rounds of matches, with each round eliminating half of the teams entering that round. The successive rounds were the quarter-finals, semi-finals, and the final. There is also a play-off to decide third and fourth place. For each game in the knockout stage, any draw at 90 minutes was followed by thirty minutes of extra time; if scores were still level, there would be a penalty shoot-out to determine who progressed to the next round.

=== Bracket ===
Quarter-finals
9 July – Wolfsburg
Germany	0
Japan (a.e.t.)	1
10 July – Augsburg
Sweden	3
Australia	1
9 July – Leverkusen
England	1 (3)
France (p)	1 (4)
10 July – Dresden
Brazil	2 (3)
United States (p)	2 (5)

Semi-finals
13 July – Frankfurt
Japan	3
Sweden	1
13 July – Mönchengladbach
France	1
United States	3

Final
17 July – Frankfurt
Japan (p)	2 (3)
United States	2 (1)
Third place play-off
16 July – Sinsheim
Sweden	2
France	1

=== Quarter-finals ===
9 July 2011
18:00

England	1–1 (a.e.t.)	France
J. Scott 59'	Report	Bussaglia 88'
Penalties
Smith (penalty scored); Carney (penalty scored); Stoney (penalty scored); Rafferty (penalty missed); F. White (penalty missed)	3–4	(penalty missed) Abily; (penalty scored) Bussaglia; (penalty scored) Thiney; (penalty scored) Bompastor; (penalty scored) Le Sommer

BayArena, Leverkusen
Attendance: 26,395
Referee: Jenny Palmqvist (Sweden)

9 July 2011
20:45

Germany	0–1 (a.e.t.)	Japan
	Report	Maruyama 108'

Volkswagen Arena, Wolfsburg
Attendance: 26,067
Referee: Quetzalli Alvarado (Mexico)

10 July 2011
13:00

Sweden	3–1	Australia
Sjögran 11'; Dahlkvist 16'; Schelin 52'	Report	Perry 40'

Impuls Arena, Augsburg
Attendance: 24,605
Referee: Silvia Reyes (Peru)

10 July 2011
17:30

Brazil	2–2 (a.e.t.)	United States
Marta 68' (pen.), 92'	Report	Daiane 2' (o.g.); Wambach 120+2'
Penalties
Cristiane (penalty scored); Marta (penalty scored); Daiane (penalty missed); Francielle (penalty scored)	3–5	(penalty scored) Boxx; (penalty scored) Lloyd; (penalty scored) Wambach; (penalty scored) Rapinoe; (penalty scored) Krieger

Rudolf-Harbig-Stadion, Dresden
Attendance: 25,598
Referee: Jacqui Melksham (Australia)

=== Semi-finals ===
13 July 2011
18:00

France	1–3	United States
Bompastor 55'	Report	Cheney 9'; Wambach 79'; Morgan 82'

Borussia-Park, Mönchengladbach
Attendance: 25,676
Referee: Kirsi Heikkinen (Finland)

13 July 2011
20:45

Japan	3–1	Sweden
Kawasumi 19', 64'; Sawa 60'	Report	Öqvist 10'

Waldstadion, Frankfurt
Attendance: 45,434
Referee: Carol Anne Chenard (Canada)

=== Third place play-off ===
16 July 2011
17:30

Sweden	2–1	France
Schelin 29'; M. Hammarström 82'	Report	Thomis 56'

Rhein-Neckar-Arena, Sinsheim
Attendance: 25,475
Referee: Kari Seitz (United States)

=== Final ===
17 July 2011
20:45

Japan	2–2 (a.e.t.)	United States
Miyama 81'; Sawa 117'	Report	Morgan 69'; Wambach 104'
Penalties
Miyama (penalty scored); Nagasato (penalty missed); Sakaguchi (penalty scored); Kumagai (penalty scored)	3–1	(penalty missed) Boxx; (penalty missed) Lloyd; (penalty missed) Heath; (penalty scored) Wambach

Waldstadion, Frankfurt
Attendance: 48,817
Referee: Bibiana Steinhaus (Germany)

== Awards ==
The following awards were given at the conclusion of the tournament. The Golden Ball (best overall player), Golden Boot (top scorer) and Golden Glove (best goalkeeper) awards were sponsored by Adidas, while the Best Young Player award was sponsored by Hyundai Motor Company. FIFA.com shortlisted ten goals for users to vote on as the Goal of the Tournament, which was sponsored by Sony.

Golden Ball	Silver Ball	Bronze Ball
(Japan) Homare Sawa	(United States) Abby Wambach	(United States) Hope Solo
Golden Boot	Silver Boot	Bronze Boot
(Japan) Homare Sawa	(Brazil) Marta	(United States) Abby Wambach
5 goals, 1 assist	4 goals, 2 assists	4 goals, 1 assist
Golden Glove
(United States) Hope Solo
Best Young Player
(Australia) Caitlin Foord
Goal of the Tournament
(United States) Abby Wambach
120+2' for 2–2 in Quarter-finals vs Brazil (10 July)
FIFA Fair Play Award
Japan

=== All-Star Team ===
Goalkeepers	Defenders	Midfielders	Forwards
(Japan) Ayumi Kaihori (United States) Hope Solo	(Australia) Elise Kellond-Knight (Brazil) Érika (England) Alex Scott (France) Sonia Bompastor (France) Laura Georges (Germany) Saskia Bartusiak	(England) Jill Scott (Equatorial Guinea) Genoveva Añonma (France) Louisa Nécib (Japan) Aya Miyama (Japan) Shinobu Ohno (Japan) Homare Sawa (Germany) Kerstin Garefrekes (Sweden) Caroline Seger (United States) Shannon Boxx (United States) Lauren Cheney	(Brazil) Marta (Sweden) Lotta Schelin (United States) Abby Wambach

== Statistics ==
=== Goalscorers ===
There were 86 goals scored in 32 matches, for an average of 2.69 goals per match. Homare Sawa of Japan won the Golden Boot award for scoring five goals.

5 goals

- (Japan) Homare Sawa

4 goals

- (Brazil) Marta
- (United States) Abby Wambach

3 goals

- (Sweden) Lisa Dahlkvist

2 goals

- (Australia) Kyah Simon
- (Brazil) Cristiane
- (Brazil) Rosana
- (England) Jill Scott
- (Equatorial Guinea) Genoveva Añonman
- (France) Marie-Laure Delie
- (France) Gaëtane Thiney
- (France) Élodie Thomis
- (Germany) Kerstin Garefrekes
- (Germany) Inka Grings
- (Germany) Célia Okoyino da Mbabi
- (Japan) Nahomi Kawasumi
- (Japan) Aya Miyama
- (Sweden) Lotta Schelin
- (United States) Lauren Cheney
- (United States) Alex Morgan

1 goal

- (Australia) Lisa De Vanna
- (Australia) Leena Khamis
- (Australia) Ellyse Perry
- (Australia) Emily van Egmond
- (Brazil) Érika
- (Canada) Christine Sinclair
- (England) Jessica Clarke
- (England) Ellen White
- (England) Fara Williams
- (England) Rachel Yankey
- (France) Camille Abily
- (France) Sonia Bompastor
- (France) Élise Bussaglia
- (France) Laura Georges
- (Germany) Simone Laudehr
- (Japan) Karina Maruyama
- (Japan) Yūki Nagasato
- (Japan) Shinobu Ohno
- (Mexico) Maribel Domínguez
- (Mexico) Stephany Mayor
- (Mexico) Mónica Ocampo
- (New Zealand) Sarah Gregorius
- (New Zealand) Amber Hearn
- (New Zealand) Rebecca Smith
- (New Zealand) Hannah Wilkinson
- (Nigeria) Perpetua Nkwocha
- (Norway) Emilie Haavi
- (Norway) Elise Thorsnes
- (Sweden) Marie Hammarström
- (Sweden) Jessica Landström
- (Sweden) Josefine Öqvist
- (Sweden) Therese Sjögran
- (United States) Rachel Buehler
- (United States) Carli Lloyd
- (United States) Heather O'Reilly
- (United States) Megan Rapinoe

1 own goal

- (Brazil) Daiane (against United States)
- (United States) Amy LePeilbet (against Sweden)

Source: FIFA

=== Assists ===
Aya Miyama of Japan won the assists table with four assists.

4 assists

- (Japan) Aya Miyama

3 assists

- (United States) Lauren Cheney
- (United States) Megan Rapinoe

2 assists

- (Australia) Collette McCallum
- (Brazil) Marta
- (England) Karen Carney
- (France) Sandrine Soubeyrand
- (Germany) Babett Peter
- (Sweden) Lotta Schelin
- (Sweden) Therese Sjögran

1 assist

- (Australia) Kim Carroll
- (Australia) Lisa De Vanna
- (Australia) Leena Khamis
- (Brazil) Cristiane
- (Brazil) Érika
- (Brazil) Maurine
- (England) Alex Scott
- (England) Jill Scott
- (England) Rachel Unitt
- (England) Rachel Yankey
- (France) Camille Abily
- (France) Eugénie Le Sommer
- (France) Louisa Nécib
- (France) Gaëtane Thiney
- (Germany) Kerstin Garefrekes
- (Germany) Inka Grings
- (Germany) Simone Laudehr
- (Japan) Yukari Kinga
- (Japan) Yūki Nagasato
- (Japan) Shinobu Ohno
- (Japan) Homare Sawa
- (Mexico) Maribel Domínguez
- (Mexico) Dinora Garza
- (Mexico) Verónica Pérez
- (New Zealand) Amber Hearn
- (New Zealand) Ria Percival
- (New Zealand) Ali Riley
- (New Zealand) Kirsty Yallop
- (Norway) Leni Larsen Kaurin
- (Norway) Ingvild Stensland
- (Sweden) Sara Larsson
- (United States) Stephanie Cox
- (United States) Carli Lloyd
- (United States) Alex Morgan
- (United States) Heather O'Reilly
- (United States) Abby Wambach

Source: FIFA Technical Report

=== Tournament ranking ===
Per statistical convention in football, matches decided in extra time are counted as wins and losses, while matches decided by penalty shoot-outs are counted as draws.

Pos	Grp	Team	Pld	W	D	L	GF	GA	GD	Pts	Final result
1	B	Japan	6	4	1	1	12	6	+6	13	Champions
2	C	United States	6	3	2	1	13	7	+6	11	Runners-up
3	C	Sweden	6	5	0	1	10	6	+4	15	Third place
4	A	France	6	2	1	3	10	10	0	7	Fourth place
5	D	Brazil	4	3	1	0	9	2	+7	10	Eliminated in quarter-finals
6	A	Germany (H)	4	3	0	1	7	4	+3	9	Eliminated in quarter-finals
7	B	England	4	2	2	0	6	3	+3	8	Eliminated in quarter-finals
8	D	Australia	4	2	0	2	6	7	−1	6	Eliminated in quarter-finals
9	A	Nigeria	3	1	0	2	1	2	−1	3	Eliminated in group stage
10	D	Norway	3	1	0	2	2	5	−3	3	Eliminated in group stage
11	B	Mexico	3	0	2	1	3	7	−4	2	Eliminated in group stage
12	B	New Zealand	3	0	1	2	4	6	−2	1	Eliminated in group stage
13	C	North Korea	3	0	1	2	0	3	−3	1	Eliminated in group stage
14	C	Colombia	3	0	1	2	0	4	−4	1	Eliminated in group stage
15	D	Equatorial Guinea	3	0	0	3	2	7	−5	0	Eliminated in group stage
16	A	Canada	3	0	0	3	1	7	−6	0	Eliminated in group stage

Source: FIFA Technical Report
(H) Hosts

== Marketing ==
=== Sponsorships ===
FIFA partners	National Supporters
Adidas; Coca-Cola; Emirates; Hyundai–Kia; Sony; Visa	Allianz; Commerzbank; Deutsche Bahn; Deutsche Post; Deutsche Telekom; REWE

== Controversy ==
=== Player gender check ===
In June 2023, Nilla Fischer revealed in her book, I Didn't Even Say Half Of It, that the Swedish team were told to show their genitalia to prove that they were women during the 2011 competition. This came after protests from Nigeria, South Africa and Ghana relating to allegations that the Equatorial Guinea squad included men. Fischer described the process, which was conducted by a female physiotherapist on behalf of the doctor, as humiliating but did not have a choice in order to not jeopardise the opportunity to play at a World Cup. FIFA said it had taken note of recent comments made by Nilla Fischer around her experiences and gender verification testing conducted by the Swedish national team at the World Cup.

== See also ==
- 2006 FIFA World Cup
- FIFA Women's World Cup
- FIFA Women's World Rankings
- FIFA World Cup
- Germany in 2011
