= 2011 FIFA Women's World Cup squads =

Teams for football tournament

The 2011 FIFA Women's World Cup was an international football tournament that took place in Germany from 26 June until 17 July 2011. The 16 national teams involved in the tournament were required to register a squad of 21 players, including three goalkeepers. Only players in these squads were eligible to take part in the tournament.

Before announcing its final squad for the tournament, each participating national federation was required to submit a provisional squad. The final 21-player squad, three of whom must be goalkeepers, could only be drawn from the provisional squad, and had to be submitted to FIFA no later than 10 working days before the start of the tournament. Replacement of seriously injured players was permitted until 24 hours before the team in question's first World Cup game. Unlike the men's World Cup, in which replacement players do not have to be drawn from the provisional squad, the Women's World Cup requires that replacements be drawn from the provisional squad.

On 17 June 2011, the final squads were submitted and published.

Totals for caps and goals, club affiliations, and ages are as of the opening day of the tournament on 26 June 2011.

== Group A ==
=== Canada ===
Head coach: (Italy) Carolina Morace

The squad was announced on 16 June.

No.	Pos.	Player	Date of birth (age)	Caps	Goals	Club
1	GK	Karina LeBlanc	30 March 1980 (aged 31)	88	0	(United States Soccer Federation) Chicago Red Stars
2	DF	Emily Zurrer	12 July 1987 (aged 23)	45	2	(Canadian Soccer Association) Vancouver Whitecaps
3	MF	Kelly Parker	8 March 1981 (aged 30)	14	1	(United States Soccer Federation) Atlanta Beat
4	DF	Carmelina Moscato	2 May 1984 (aged 27)	52	2	Unattached
5	DF	Robyn Gayle	31 October 1985 (aged 25)	44	0	(Canadian Soccer Association) Vancouver Whitecaps
6	MF	Kaylyn Kyle	6 October 1988 (aged 22)	32	2	(Canadian Soccer Association) Vancouver Whitecaps
7	DF	Rhian Wilkinson	12 May 1982 (aged 29)	100	7	(Norwegian Football Federation) Lillestrøm SK
8	MF	Diana Matheson	6 April 1984 (aged 27)	122	10	(Norwegian Football Federation) Lillestrøm SK
9	DF	Candace Chapman	2 April 1983 (aged 28)	88	6	(United States Soccer Federation) Western New York Flash
10	MF	Jodi-Ann Robinson	17 April 1989 (aged 22)	50	7	(Canadian Soccer Association) Vancouver Whitecaps
11	MF	Desiree Scott	31 July 1987 (aged 23)	22	0	(Canadian Soccer Association) Vancouver Whitecaps
12	FW	Christine Sinclair (captain)	12 June 1983 (aged 28)	159	116	(United States Soccer Federation) Western New York Flash
13	MF	Sophie Schmidt	28 June 1988 (aged 22)	63	3	(Canadian Soccer Association) Vancouver Whitecaps
14	FW	Melissa Tancredi	27 December 1981 (aged 29)	61	13	(Canadian Soccer Association) Vancouver Whitecaps
15	FW	Christina Julien	6 May 1988 (aged 23)	28	7	(Canadian Soccer Association) Ottawa Fury
16	FW	Jonelle Filigno	24 September 1990 (aged 20)	39	8	(United States Soccer Federation) Rutgers University
17	DF	Brittany Timko	5 September 1985 (aged 25)	101	4	Unattached
18	GK	Erin McLeod	26 February 1983 (aged 28)	62	0	(United States Soccer Federation) Chicago Red Stars
19	MF	Chelsea Stewart	28 April 1990 (aged 21)	23	0	(Canadian Soccer Association) Vancouver Whitecaps
20	DF	Marie-Ève Nault	16 February 1982 (aged 29)	43	0	(Canadian Soccer Association) Ottawa Fury
21	GK	Stephanie Labbé	10 October 1986 (aged 24)	8	0	(Swedish Football Association) Piteå IF

=== France ===
Head coach: Bruno Bini

The squad was named on 6 June.

No.	Pos.	Player	Date of birth (age)	Caps	Goals	Club
1	GK	Céline Deville	24 January 1982 (aged 29)	42	0	(French Football Federation) Montpellier
2	DF	Wendie Renard	20 July 1990 (aged 20)	7	0	(French Football Federation) Lyon
3	DF	Laure Boulleau	22 October 1986 (aged 24)	13	1	(French Football Federation) Paris Saint-Germain
4	DF	Laura Georges	20 August 1984 (aged 26)	98	2	(French Football Federation) Lyon
5	DF	Ophélie Meilleroux	18 January 1984 (aged 27)	44	0	(French Football Federation) Montpellier
6	MF	Sandrine Soubeyrand (captain)	16 August 1973 (aged 37)	161	17	(French Football Federation) Juvisy
7	MF	Corine Franco	5 October 1983 (aged 27)	47	8	(French Football Federation) Lyon
8	MF	Sonia Bompastor	8 June 1980 (aged 31)	128	15	(French Football Federation) Lyon
9	FW	Eugénie Le Sommer	18 May 1989 (aged 22)	34	9	(French Football Federation) Lyon
10	MF	Camille Abily	5 December 1984 (aged 26)	75	19	(French Football Federation) Lyon
11	DF	Laure Lepailleur	7 March 1985 (aged 26)	28	2	(French Football Federation) Paris Saint-Germain
12	FW	Élodie Thomis	13 August 1986 (aged 24)	52	15	(French Football Federation) Lyon
13	MF	Caroline Pizzala	23 November 1987 (aged 23)	15	0	(French Football Federation) Paris Saint-Germain
14	MF	Louisa Nécib	23 January 1987 (aged 24)	58	10	(French Football Federation) Lyon
15	MF	Élise Bussaglia	24 September 1985 (aged 25)	81	18	(French Football Federation) Paris Saint-Germain
16	GK	Bérangère Sapowicz	6 February 1983 (aged 28)	18	0	(French Football Federation) Paris Saint-Germain
17	FW	Gaëtane Thiney	28 October 1985 (aged 25)	48	19	(French Football Federation) Juvisy
18	FW	Marie-Laure Delie	29 January 1988 (aged 23)	20	21	(French Football Federation) Montpellier
19	FW	Sandrine Brétigny	2 July 1984 (aged 26)	19	9	(French Football Federation) Lyon
20	DF	Sabrina Viguier	4 January 1981 (aged 30)	85	1	(French Football Federation) Lyon
21	GK	Laëtitia Philippe	30 April 1991 (aged 20)	1	0	(French Football Federation) Montpellier

=== Germany ===
Head coach: Silvia Neid

A pre-squad of 26 players was announced on 18 March. After Dzsenifer Marozsán got injured in a training with the German national team, Conny Pohlers was called in to the squad. The line-up was officially reduced to 21 players on 27 May 2011.

No.	Pos.	Player	Date of birth (age)	Caps	Goals	Club
1	GK	Nadine Angerer	10 November 1978 (aged 32)	97	0	(German Football Association) 1. FFC Frankfurt
2	DF	Bianca Schmidt	23 January 1990 (aged 21)	15	0	(German Football Association) 1. FFC Turbine Potsdam
3	DF	Saskia Bartusiak	9 September 1982 (aged 28)	40	0	(German Football Association) 1. FFC Frankfurt
4	DF	Babett Peter	12 May 1988 (aged 23)	50	1	(German Football Association) 1. FFC Turbine Potsdam
5	DF	Annike Krahn	1 July 1985 (aged 25)	65	4	(German Football Association) FCR 2001 Duisburg
6	MF	Simone Laudehr	12 July 1986 (aged 24)	40	8	(German Football Association) FCR 2001 Duisburg
7	MF	Melanie Behringer	18 November 1985 (aged 25)	64	17	(German Football Association) 1. FFC Frankfurt
8	FW	Inka Grings	31 October 1978 (aged 32)	89	62	(German Football Association) FCR 2001 Duisburg
9	FW	Birgit Prinz (captain)	25 October 1977 (aged 33)	211	128	(German Football Association) 1. FFC Frankfurt
10	DF	Linda Bresonik	7 December 1983 (aged 27)	64	5	(German Football Association) FCR 2001 Duisburg
11	FW	Alexandra Popp	6 April 1991 (aged 20)	11	7	(German Football Association) FCR 2001 Duisburg
12	GK	Ursula Holl	26 June 1982 (aged 29)	5	0	(German Football Association) FCR 2001 Duisburg
13	MF	Célia Okoyino da Mbabi	27 June 1988 (aged 22)	54	10	(German Football Association) SC 07 Bad Neuenahr
14	MF	Kim Kulig	9 April 1990 (aged 21)	23	6	(German Football Association) Hamburger SV
15	DF	Verena Faißt	22 May 1989 (aged 22)	3	0	(German Football Association) VfL Wolfsburg
16	FW	Martina Müller	18 April 1980 (aged 31)	92	30	(German Football Association) VfL Wolfsburg
17	MF	Ariane Hingst	25 July 1979 (aged 31)	172	10	(German Football Association) 1. FFC Frankfurt
18	MF	Kerstin Garefrekes	4 September 1979 (aged 31)	125	41	(German Football Association) 1. FFC Frankfurt
19	MF	Fatmire Bajramaj	1 April 1988 (aged 23)	46	8	(German Football Association) 1. FFC Turbine Potsdam
20	DF	Lena Goeßling	8 March 1986 (aged 25)	22	0	(German Football Association) SC 07 Bad Neuenahr
21	GK	Almuth Schult	9 February 1991 (aged 20)	0	0	(German Football Association) Magdeburger FFC

=== Nigeria ===
Head coach: Ngozi Eucharia Uche

The final squad was announced on 14 June.

No.	Pos.	Player	Date of birth (age)	Caps	Goals	Club
1	GK	Precious Dede (captain)	18 January 1980 (aged 31)	70	0	(Nigeria Football Federation) Rivers Angels
2	MF	Rebecca Kalu	12 June 1990 (aged 21)	1	0	(Nigeria Football Federation) Rivers Angels
3	DF	Osinachi Ohale	21 December 1991 (aged 19)	9	0	(Nigeria Football Federation) Delta Queens
4	MF	Perpetua Nkwocha	3 January 1976 (aged 35)	80	40	(Swedish Football Association) Sunnanå SK
5	DF	Onome Ebi	5 August 1983 (aged 27)	45	0	(Turkish Football Federation) Düvenciler Lisesispor
6	DF	Helen Ukaonu	17 May 1991 (aged 20)	11	1	(Swedish Football Association) Sunnanå SK
7	FW	Stella Mbachu	16 April 1978 (aged 33)	85	20	(Nigeria Football Federation) Rivers Angels
8	MF	Ebere Orji	23 December 1992 (aged 18)	13	2	(Nigeria Football Federation) Rivers Angels
9	FW	Desire Oparanozie	17 December 1993 (aged 17)	12	6	(Nigeria Football Federation) Delta Queens
10	MF	Rita Chikwelu	6 March 1988 (aged 23)	37	16	(Swedish Football Association) Umeå IK
11	MF	Glory Iroka	3 January 1990 (aged 21)	8	0	(Nigeria Football Federation) Rivers Angels
12	FW	Sarah Michael	22 July 1990 (aged 20)	6	0	(Swedish Football Association) KIF Örebro DFF
13	MF	Ogonna Chukwudi	4 September 1988 (aged 22)	12	0	(Swedish Football Association) Umeå IK
14	DF	Faith Ikidi	28 February 1987 (aged 24)	47	0	(Swedish Football Association) Piteå IF
15	DF	Josephine Chukwunonye	19 March 1992 (aged 19)	10	0	(Nigeria Football Federation) Rivers Angels
16	GK	Tochukwu Oluehi	3 June 1988 (aged 23)	40	0	(Nigeria Football Federation) Sunshine Queens
17	FW	Francisca Ordega	19 October 1993 (aged 17)	9	1	(Nigeria Football Federation) Bayelsa Queens
18	DF	Ulunma Jerome	11 April 1988 (aged 23)	37	0	(Swedish Football Association) Piteå IF
19	FW	Uchechi Sunday	9 September 1994 (aged 16)	0	0	(Swiss Football Association) FC Neunkirch
20	FW	Amenze Aighewi	21 November 1991 (aged 19)	3	0	(Nigeria Football Federation) Rivers Angels
21	GK	Alaba Jonathan	1 June 1992 (aged 19)	0	0	(Nigeria Football Federation) Pelican Stars

== Group B ==
=== England ===
Head coach: Hope Powell

The squad was announced on 10 June 2011.

No.	Pos.	Player	Date of birth (age)	Caps	Goals	Club
1	GK	Karen Bardsley	14 October 1984 (aged 26)	12	0	(United States Soccer Federation) Sky Blue FC
2	DF	Alex Scott	14 October 1984 (aged 26)	33	6	(United States Soccer Federation) Boston Breakers
3	DF	Rachel Unitt	5 June 1982 (aged 29)	63	4	(The Football Association) Everton L.F.C.
4	MF	Jill Scott	2 February 1987 (aged 24)	11	1	(The Football Association) Everton L.F.C.
5	DF	Faye White (captain)	2 February 1978 (aged 33)	56	4	(The Football Association) Arsenal L.F.C.
6	DF	Casey Stoney	13 May 1982 (aged 29)	49	2	(The Football Association) Lincoln Ladies F.C.
7	FW	Jessica Clarke	5 May 1989 (aged 22)	25	6	(The Football Association) Lincoln Ladies F.C.
8	MF	Fara Williams	25 January 1984 (aged 27)	53	16	(The Football Association) Everton L.F.C.
9	FW	Ellen White	9 May 1989 (aged 22)	14	5	(The Football Association) Arsenal L.F.C.
10	FW	Kelly Smith	29 October 1978 (aged 32)	103	25	(United States Soccer Federation) Boston Breakers
11	MF	Rachel Yankey	1 November 1979 (aged 31)	108	11	(The Football Association) Arsenal L.F.C.
12	MF	Karen Carney	1 August 1987 (aged 23)	31	5	(The Football Association) Birmingham City L.F.C.
13	GK	Rachel Brown	2 July 1980 (aged 30)	48	0	(The Football Association) Everton L.F.C.
14	FW	Eniola Aluko	21 February 1987 (aged 24)	26	4	(United States Soccer Federation) Sky Blue FC
15	DF	Sophie Bradley	5 May 1989 (aged 22)	5	0	(The Football Association) Lincoln Ladies F.C.
16	DF	Steph Houghton	23 April 1988 (aged 23)	16	1	(The Football Association) Arsenal L.F.C.
17	DF	Laura Bassett	2 August 1983 (aged 27)	19	0	(The Football Association) Birmingham City L.F.C.
18	DF	Anita Asante	27 April 1985 (aged 26)	24	1	(United States Soccer Federation) Sky Blue FC
19	DF	Dunia Susi	10 August 1987 (aged 23)	13	0	(The Football Association) Birmingham City L.F.C.
20	DF	Claire Rafferty	11 January 1989 (aged 22)	4	1	(The Football Association) Chelsea L.F.C.
21	GK	Siobhan Chamberlain	15 August 1983 (aged 27)	6	0	(The Football Association) Bristol Academy

=== Japan ===
Head coach: Norio Sasaki

The squad was announced on 8 June 2011.

No.	Pos.	Player	Date of birth (age)	Caps	Goals	Club
1	GK	Nozomi Yamago	16 January 1975 (aged 36)	96	0	(Japan Football Association) Urawa Red Diamonds Ladies
2	DF	Yukari Kinga	2 May 1984 (aged 27)	62	4	(Japan Football Association) INAC Kobe Leonessa
3	DF	Azusa Iwashimizu	14 October 1986 (aged 24)	64	8	(Japan Football Association) NTV Beleza
4	DF	Saki Kumagai	17 October 1990 (aged 20)	23	0	(Japan Football Association) Urawa Red Diamonds Ladies
5	DF	Kyoko Yano	3 June 1984 (aged 27)	67	1	(Japan Football Association) Urawa Red Diamonds Ladies
6	MF	Mizuho Sakaguchi	15 October 1987 (aged 23)	38	15	(Japan Football Association) Albirex Niigata Ladies
7	FW	Kozue Ando	9 July 1982 (aged 28)	86	17	(German Football Association) FCR 2001 Duisburg
8	MF	Aya Miyama	28 January 1985 (aged 26)	93	24	(Japan Football Association) Okayama Yunogo Belle
9	FW	Nahomi Kawasumi	23 September 1985 (aged 25)	14	2	(Japan Football Association) INAC Kobe Leonessa
10	MF	Homare Sawa (captain)	9 July 1978 (aged 32)	167	75	(Japan Football Association) INAC Kobe Leonessa
11	FW	Shinobu Ohno	23 January 1984 (aged 27)	87	34	(Japan Football Association) INAC Kobe Leonessa
12	GK	Miho Fukumoto	2 October 1983 (aged 27)	54	0	(Japan Football Association) Okayama Yunogo Belle
13	MF	Rumi Utsugi	5 December 1988 (aged 22)	43	5	(French Football Federation) Montpellier HSC
14	MF	Megumi Kamionobe	15 March 1986 (aged 25)	13	2	(Japan Football Association) Albirex Niigata Ladies
15	DF	Aya Sameshima	16 June 1987 (aged 24)	27	2	(United States Soccer Federation) Boston Breakers
16	MF	Asuna Tanaka	23 April 1988 (aged 23)	3	0	(Japan Football Association) INAC Kobe Leonessa
17	MF	Yūki Nagasato	15 June 1987 (aged 24)	64	31	(German Football Association) 1. FFC Turbine Potsdam
18	FW	Karina Maruyama	26 March 1983 (aged 28)	62	13	(Japan Football Association) JEF United Chiba Ladies
19	FW	Megumi Takase	10 November 1990 (aged 20)	16	4	(Japan Football Association) INAC Kobe Leonessa
20	FW	Mana Iwabuchi	18 March 1993 (aged 18)	6	2	(Japan Football Association) NTV Beleza
21	GK	Ayumi Kaihori	4 September 1986 (aged 24)	18	0	(Japan Football Association) INAC Kobe Leonessa

=== Mexico ===
Head coach: Leonardo Cuéllar

No.	Pos.	Player	Date of birth (age)	Caps	Goals	Club
1	GK	Erika Vanegas	7 July 1988 (aged 22)	13	0	Unattached
2	DF	Kenti Robles	15 February 1991 (aged 20)	12	0	(Royal Spanish Football Federation) RCD Espanyol
3	DF	Marlene Sandoval	18 January 1984 (aged 27)	70	5	Unattached
4	DF	Alina Garciamendez	16 April 1991 (aged 20)	17	1	(United States Soccer Federation) Stanford University
5	DF	Natalie Vinti	2 January 1988 (aged 23)	20	0	(United States Soccer Federation) University of San Diego
6	DF	Natalie Garcia	30 January 1990 (aged 21)	3	0	(United States Soccer Federation) University of San Diego
7	MF	Evelyn López	25 December 1978 (aged 32)	102	14	Unattached
8	MF	Lupita Worbis	12 December 1983 (aged 27)	95	22	(Royal Spanish Football Federation) Extremadura Femenino CF
9	FW	Maribel Domínguez (captain)	18 November 1978 (aged 32)	90	67	(Royal Spanish Football Federation) UE L'Estartit
10	MF	Dinora Garza	24 January 1988 (aged 23)	30	9	(Mexican Football Federation) Tigres de la UANL
11	MF	Nayeli Rangel	28 February 1992 (aged 19)	27	3	(Mexican Football Federation) Tigres de la UANL
12	GK	Pamela Tajonar	2 December 1984 (aged 26)	36	0	(Royal Spanish Football Federation) Club Atlético Málaga
13	MF	Liliana Mercado	22 October 1988 (aged 22)	11	0	(Mexican Football Federation) UDLA Puebla
14	DF	Mónica Alvarado	11 January 1991 (aged 20)	5	0	(United States Soccer Federation) Texas Christian University
15	DF	Luz Saucedo	14 December 1983 (aged 27)	91	2	Unattached
16	DF	Charlyn Corral	11 September 1991 (aged 19)	19	3	(Mexican Football Federation) Monterrey Royal Eagles
17	MF	Teresa Noyola	15 April 1990 (aged 21)	7	0	(United States Soccer Federation) Stanford University
18	FW	Verónica Pérez	18 May 1988 (aged 23)	23	4	(United States Soccer Federation) Saint Louis Athletica
19	FW	Mónica Ocampo	4 January 1987 (aged 24)	36	12	(United States Soccer Federation) Atlanta Beat
20	GK	Cecilia Santiago	19 October 1994 (aged 16)	11	0	(Mexican Football Federation) Santos Laguna
21	FW	Stephany Mayor	23 September 1991 (aged 19)	16	5	(Mexican Football Federation) UDLA Puebla

=== New Zealand ===
Head coach: (England) John Herdman

The squad was announced on 8 June 2011.

No.	Pos.	Player	Date of birth (age)	Caps	Goals	Club
1	GK	Jenny Bindon	25 February 1973 (aged 38)	16	0	(New Zealand Football) Hibiscus Coast AFC
2	DF	Ria Percival	7 December 1989 (aged 21)	16	2	(New Zealand Football) Lynn-Avon United
3	DF	Anna Green	20 August 1990 (aged 20)	37	5	(New Zealand Football) Three Kings United
4	MF	Katie Hoyle	1 February 1988 (aged 23)	11	0	(New Zealand Football) Glenfield Rovers
5	DF	Abby Erceg	20 November 1989 (aged 21)	16	2	(New Zealand Football) Fencibles United
6	DF	Rebecca Smith (captain)	17 June 1981 (aged 30)	25	2	(German Football Association) VfL Wolfsburg
7	DF	Ali Riley	30 October 1987 (aged 23)	12	0	(United States Soccer Federation) Western New York Flash
8	MF	Hayley Moorwood	13 February 1984 (aged 27)	24	2	(The Football Association) Chelsea L.F.C.
9	FW	Amber Hearn	28 November 1984 (aged 26)	43	22	(New Zealand Football) Lynn-Avon United
10	FW	Sarah Gregorius	6 August 1987 (aged 23)	13	8	(New Zealand Football) Eastern Suburbs AFC
11	MF	Kirsty Yallop	4 November 1986 (aged 24)	47	11	(New Zealand Football) Lynn-Avon United
12	MF	Betsy Hassett	4 August 1990 (aged 20)	23	2	(United States Soccer Federation) University of California, Berkeley
13	FW	Rosie White	6 June 1993 (aged 18)	27	7	(New Zealand Football) Three Kings United
14	FW	Sarah McLaughlin	3 June 1991 (aged 20)	9	0	(New Zealand Football) Claudelands Rovers
15	FW	Emma Kete	1 September 1987 (aged 23)	40	3	(The Football Association) Lincoln Ladies F.C.
16	MF	Annalie Longo	1 July 1991 (aged 19)	9	0	(New Zealand Football) Three Kings United
17	FW	Hannah Wilkinson	28 May 1992 (aged 19)	19	8	(New Zealand Football) Glenfield Rovers
18	DF	Katie Bowen	15 April 1994 (aged 17)	2	0	(New Zealand Football) Glenfield Rovers
19	DF	Kristy Hill	1 July 1979 (aged 31)	17	0	(New Zealand Football) Fencibles United
20	GK	Aroon Clansey	12 February 1986 (aged 25)	62	0	(New Zealand Football) Three Kings United
21	GK	Erin Nayler	17 April 1992 (aged 19)	0	0	(New Zealand Football) Eastern Suburbs AFC

== Group C ==
=== Colombia ===
Head coach: Ricardo Rozo

On 29 May 2011, Rozo announced a 25-player preliminary squad. The final squad was announced on 13 June. Goalkeeper Paula Forero was injured and replaced with Yineth Varón. On 25 June 2011, Varón tested positive to an unknown substance and was provisionally suspended by the FIFA.

No.	Pos.	Player	Date of birth (age)	Caps	Goals	Club
1	GK	Yineth Varón	23 June 1982 (aged 29)	2	0	(Colombian Football Federation) Palmiranas
2	DF	Yuli Muñoz	18 March 1989 (aged 22)	14	1	(Colombian Football Federation) Estudiantes
3	DF	Natalia Gaitán (captain)	3 April 1991 (aged 20)	1	0	(United States Soccer Federation) University of Toledo
4	MF	Diana Ospina	3 March 1989 (aged 22)	1	0	(Colombian Football Federation) Formas Íntimas
5	DF	Nataly Arias	2 April 1986 (aged 25)	11	3	(United States Soccer Federation) University of Maryland
6	MF	Daniela Montoya	22 August 1990 (aged 20)			(Colombian Football Federation) Formas Íntimas
7	FW	Catalina Usme	25 December 1989 (aged 21)	8	1	(Colombian Football Federation) Independiente Medellín
8	DF	Andrea Peralta	9 May 1988 (aged 23)	17	14	(Colombian Football Federation) Estudiantes
9	MF	Carmen Rodallega	15 July 1983 (aged 27)	24	1	(Colombian Football Federation) Sarmiento Lora
10	MF	Yoreli Rincón	27 July 1993 (aged 17)	29	4	(Colombian Football Federation) Gol Star
11	MF	Liana Salazar	16 September 1992 (aged 18)	11	8	(United States Soccer Federation) University of Kansas
12	GK	Sandra Sepúlveda	3 March 1988 (aged 23)	10	0	(Colombian Football Federation) Formas Íntimas
13	MF	Yulieth Domínguez	6 September 1993 (aged 17)	11	0	(Colombian Football Federation) Estudiantes
14	DF	Kelis Peduzine	21 April 1983 (aged 28)	12	3	(Colombian Football Federation) Deportivo Eba
15	MF	Tatiana Ariza	21 February 1991 (aged 20)	19	2	(United States Soccer Federation) Austin Peay State University
16	FW	Lady Andrade	10 January 1992 (aged 19)	10	1	(Colombian Football Federation) Inter de Bogotá
17	FW	Ingrid Vidal	22 April 1991 (aged 20)	5	1	(Colombian Football Federation) Palmiranas
18	FW	Katerin Castro	21 November 1991 (aged 19)	14	5	(Colombian Football Federation) Estudiantes
19	DF	Fátima Montaño	2 October 1984 (aged 26)	3	3	(Colombian Football Federation) Águila
20	MF	Oriánica Velásquez	1 August 1989 (aged 21)	10	1	(United States Soccer Federation) Indiana University
21	GK	Alejandra Velasco	23 August 1985 (aged 25)	0	0	(Colombian Football Federation) Gol Star

=== North Korea ===
Head coach: Kim Kwang-min

On 6 July 2011, Song Jong-sun and Jong Pok-sim were provisionally suspended prior to their team's match against Colombia after failing doping tests during the tournament. Following North Korea's elimination from the tournament, FIFA announced that three additional players (Hong Myong-hui, Ho Un-byol and Ri Un-hyang) also tested positive following target testing of the whole team.

No.	Pos.	Player	Date of birth (age)	Caps	Goals	Club
1	GK	Hong Myong-hui	4 September 1991 (aged 19)	9	0	(DPR Korea Football Association) 25 April
2	DF	Jon Hong-yon	11 June 1992 (aged 19)	1	0	(DPR Korea Football Association) 25 April
3	DF	Ho Un-byol	19 January 1992 (aged 19)	1	0	(DPR Korea Football Association) 25 April
4	MF	Kim Myong-gum	4 November 1990 (aged 20)	2	0	(DPR Korea Football Association) Rimyongsu
5	DF	Song Jong-sun	11 March 1981 (aged 30)	14	0	(DPR Korea Football Association) Rimyongsu
6	DF	Paek Sol-hui	20 March 1994 (aged 17)	3	0	(DPR Korea Football Association) 25 April
7	FW	Yun Hyon-hi	9 September 1992 (aged 18)	1	0	(DPR Korea Football Association) 25 April
8	MF	Kim Su-gyong	4 January 1995 (aged 16)	3	0	(DPR Korea Football Association) 25 April
9	FW	Ra Un-sim	2 July 1988 (aged 22)	20	7	(DPR Korea Football Association) Amrokgang
10	MF	Jo Yun-mi (captain)	5 January 1987 (aged 24)	30	6	(DPR Korea Football Association) 25 April
11	MF	Ri Ye-gyong	26 October 1989 (aged 21)	14	0	(DPR Korea Football Association) Amrokgang
12	MF	Jon Myong-hwa	9 August 1993 (aged 17)	9	2	(DPR Korea Football Association) 25 April
13	MF	Kim Un-ju	9 April 1993 (aged 18)	4	0	(DPR Korea Football Association) 25 April
14	MF	Kim Chung-sim	27 November 1990 (aged 20)	14	0	(DPR Korea Football Association) 25 April
15	DF	Yu Jong-hui	21 March 1986 (aged 25)	7	0	(DPR Korea Football Association) 25 April
16	DF	Jong Pok-sim	31 July 1985 (aged 25)	6	0	(DPR Korea Football Association) 25 April
17	DF	Ri Un-hyang	15 May 1988 (aged 23)	1	0	(DPR Korea Football Association) Amrokgang
18	GK	Kim Chol-ok	15 October 1994 (aged 16)	1	0	(DPR Korea Football Association) 25 April
19	FW	Choe Mi-gyong	17 January 1991 (aged 20)	2	0	(DPR Korea Football Association) Rimyongsu
20	FW	Kwon Song-hwa	5 February 1992 (aged 19)	2	0	(DPR Korea Football Association) 25 April
21	GK	Ri Jin-sim	29 May 1991 (aged 20)	1	0	(DPR Korea Football Association) Wolmido

=== Sweden ===
Head coach: Thomas Dennerby

On 30 May 2011, Dennerby announced the 21-player squad.

No.	Pos.	Player	Date of birth (age)	Caps	Goals	Club
1	GK	Hedvig Lindahl	29 April 1983 (aged 28)	24	0	(Swedish Football Association) Kristianstads DFF
2	DF	Charlotte Rohlin	2 December 1980 (aged 30)	4	1	(Swedish Football Association) Linköpings FC
3	DF	Linda Sembrant	15 May 1987 (aged 24)	22	1	(Swedish Football Association) Kopparbergs/Göteborg FC
4	DF	Annica Svensson	3 March 1983 (aged 28)	12	0	(Swedish Football Association) Tyresö FF
5	MF	Caroline Seger (captain)	19 March 1985 (aged 26)	34	3	(United States Soccer Federation) Western New York Flash
6	DF	Sara Thunebro	26 April 1979 (aged 32)	21	2	(German Football Association) 1. FFC Frankfurt
7	DF	Sara Larsson	13 May 1979 (aged 32)	101	6	(Swedish Football Association) KIF Örebro DFF
8	FW	Lotta Schelin	27 February 1984 (aged 27)	45	11	(French Football Federation) Olympique Lyonnais
9	FW	Jessica Landström	12 December 1984 (aged 26)	50	16	(German Football Association) 1. FFC Frankfurt
10	MF	Sofia Jakobsson	23 April 1990 (aged 21)	1	0	(Swedish Football Association) Umeå IK
11	MF	Antonia Göransson	16 September 1990 (aged 20)	9	0	(German Football Association) Hamburger SV
12	GK	Kristin Hammarström	29 March 1982 (aged 29)	0	0	(Swedish Football Association) Kopparbergs/Göteborg FC
13	DF	Lina Nilsson	17 June 1987 (aged 24)	26	0	(Swedish Football Association) LdB FC Malmö
14	FW	Josefine Öqvist	23 July 1983 (aged 27)	64	17	(Swedish Football Association) Tyresö FF
15	MF	Therese Sjögran	8 April 1977 (aged 34)	160	11	(United States Soccer Federation) Sky Blue FC
16	MF	Linda Forsberg	19 June 1985 (aged 26)	4	0	(Swedish Football Association) LdB FC Malmö
17	MF	Lisa Dahlkvist	6 February 1987 (aged 24)	35	5	(Swedish Football Association) Kopparbergs/Göteborg FC
18	MF	Nilla Fischer	2 August 1984 (aged 26)	22	2	(Swedish Football Association) LdB FC Malmö
19	FW	Madelaine Edlund	15 September 1985 (aged 25)	1	0	(Swedish Football Association) Tyresö FF
20	MF	Marie Hammarström	29 March 1982 (aged 29)	9	0	(Swedish Football Association) KIF Örebro DFF
21	GK	Sofia Lundgren	20 September 1982 (aged 28)	19	0	(Swedish Football Association) Linköpings FC

=== United States ===
Head coach: (Sweden) Pia Sundhage

Coach Pia Sundhage announced her final 21-player squad on 9 May. US Soccer has provided a full squad listing on its official site. Lindsay Tarpley, named to the original squad, tore her right ACL in a friendly against Japan on 14 May, and missed the World Cup. Kelley O'Hara was named to replace Tarpley on 1 June.

No.	Pos.	Player	Date of birth (age)	Caps	Goals	Club
1	GK	Hope Solo	30 July 1981 (aged 29)	95	0	(United States Soccer Federation) magicJack
2	DF	Heather Mitts	9 June 1978 (aged 33)	116	2	(United States Soccer Federation) Atlanta Beat
3	DF	Christie Rampone (captain)	24 June 1975 (aged 36)	235	4	(United States Soccer Federation) magicJack
4	DF	Becky Sauerbrunn	6 June 1985 (aged 26)	11	0	(United States Soccer Federation) magicJack
5	MF	Kelley O'Hara	4 August 1988 (aged 22)	5	0	(United States Soccer Federation) Boston Breakers
6	DF	Amy LePeilbet	12 March 1982 (aged 29)	49	0	(United States Soccer Federation) Boston Breakers
7	MF	Shannon Boxx	29 June 1977 (aged 33)	146	22	(United States Soccer Federation) magicJack
8	FW	Amy Rodriguez	17 February 1987 (aged 24)	65	17	(United States Soccer Federation) Philadelphia Independence
9	MF	Heather O'Reilly	2 January 1985 (aged 26)	144	29	(United States Soccer Federation) Sky Blue FC
10	MF	Carli Lloyd	16 July 1982 (aged 28)	111	27	(United States Soccer Federation) Atlanta Beat
11	DF	Ali Krieger	28 July 1984 (aged 26)	18	0	(German Football Association) 1. FFC Frankfurt
12	FW	Lauren Cheney	30 September 1987 (aged 23)	42	14	(United States Soccer Federation) Boston Breakers
13	FW	Alex Morgan	2 July 1989 (aged 21)	19	7	(United States Soccer Federation) Western New York Flash
14	DF	Stephanie Cox	3 April 1986 (aged 25)	74	0	(United States Soccer Federation) Boston Breakers
15	MF	Megan Rapinoe	5 July 1985 (aged 25)	31	10	(United States Soccer Federation) Philadelphia Independence
16	MF	Lori Lindsey	19 March 1980 (aged 31)	22	0	(United States Soccer Federation) Philadelphia Independence
17	MF	Tobin Heath	29 May 1988 (aged 23)	27	2	(United States Soccer Federation) Sky Blue FC
18	GK	Nicole Barnhart	10 October 1981 (aged 29)	39	0	(United States Soccer Federation) Philadelphia Independence
19	DF	Rachel Buehler	26 August 1985 (aged 25)	59	1	(United States Soccer Federation) Boston Breakers
20	FW	Abby Wambach	2 June 1980 (aged 31)	157	118	(United States Soccer Federation) magicJack
21	GK	Jillian Loyden	25 May 1985 (aged 26)	1	0	(United States Soccer Federation) magicJack

== Group D ==
=== Australia ===
Head coach: (Scotland) Tom Sermanni

No.	Pos.	Player	Date of birth (age)	Caps	Goals	Club
1	GK	Melissa Barbieri (captain)	20 January 1980 (aged 31)	52	0	(Football Australia) Melbourne Victory FC
2	DF	Teigen Allen	12 February 1994 (aged 17)	7	0	(Football Australia) Sydney FC
3	DF	Kim Carroll	2 September 1987 (aged 23)	38	2	(Football Australia) Brisbane Roar
4	DF	Clare Polkinghorne	2 January 1989 (aged 22)	10	0	(Football Australia) Brisbane Roar
5	DF	Laura Alleway	28 November 1989 (aged 21)	2	0	(Football Australia) Brisbane Roar
6	DF	Ellyse Perry	3 November 1990 (aged 20)	13	2	(Football Australia) Canberra United
7	MF	Heather Garriock	21 December 1982 (aged 28)	118	14	(Swedish Football Association) LdB Malmo
8	MF	Elise Kellond-Knight	10 August 1990 (aged 20)	19	0	(Football Australia) Brisbane Roar
9	FW	Caitlin Foord	11 November 1994 (aged 16)	1	1	(Football Australia) Sydney FC
10	MF	Servet Uzunlar	8 March 1989 (aged 22)	20	1	(Football Australia) Sydney FC
11	FW	Lisa De Vanna	14 November 1984 (aged 26)	48	17	(United States Soccer Federation) magicJack
12	FW	Emily van Egmond	12 July 1993 (aged 17)	3	0	(Football Australia) Canberra United
13	MF	Tameka Butt	16 June 1991 (aged 20)	19	1	(Football Australia) Brisbane Roar
14	MF	Collette McCallum	26 March 1986 (aged 25)	35	7	(Football Australia) Perth Glory
15	MF	Sally Shipard	20 October 1987 (aged 23)	35	2	(Football Australia) Canberra United
16	MF	Lauren Colthorpe	25 October 1985 (aged 25)	16	2	(Football Australia) Brisbane Roar
17	FW	Kyah Simon	25 June 1991 (aged 20)	24	4	(Football Australia) Sydney FC
18	GK	Lydia Williams	13 May 1988 (aged 23)	5	0	(Football Australia) Canberra United
19	FW	Leena Khamis	19 June 1986 (aged 25)	16	4	(Football Australia) Sydney FC
20	MF	Sam Kerr	10 September 1993 (aged 17)	13	3	(Football Australia) Perth Glory
21	GK	Casey Dumont	25 January 1992 (aged 19)	0	0	(Football Australia) Brisbane Roar

=== Brazil ===
Head coach: Kleiton Lima

The Brazilian Football Confederation (CBF) announced a preliminary squad of 25 players on 25 May, which was reduced to the final 21-player squad on 10 June.

No.	Pos.	Player	Date of birth (age)	Caps	Goals	Club
1	GK	Andréia	14 September 1977 (aged 33)	46	0	(Brazilian Football Confederation) Santos
2	MF	Maurine	14 January 1986 (aged 25)	44	11	(United States Soccer Federation) Western New York Flash
3	DF	Daiane	15 April 1983 (aged 28)	12	3	(Brazilian Football Confederation) Botucatu
4	DF	Aline (captain)	7 June 1982 (aged 29)	23	4	(Brazilian Football Confederation) Santos
5	MF	Renata Costa	8 July 1986 (aged 24)	63	27	Unattached
6	DF	Rosana	7 July 1982 (aged 28)	32	6	(Brazilian Football Confederation) Centro Olímpico
7	MF	Ester	9 December 1982 (aged 28)	26	2	(Brazilian Football Confederation) Santos
8	MF	Formiga	3 March 1978 (aged 33)	46	12	Unattached
9	FW	Bia Zaneratto	17 December 1993 (aged 17)	2	0	(Brazilian Football Confederation) Bangu
10	FW	Marta	19 February 1986 (aged 25)	69	76	(United States Soccer Federation) Western New York Flash
11	FW	Cristiane	15 May 1985 (aged 26)	56	41	(Brazilian Football Confederation) Santos
12	GK	Bárbara	4 July 1988 (aged 22)	18	2	(Brazilian Football Confederation) Foz Cataratas
13	DF	Érika	4 February 1988 (aged 23)	14	8	(Brazilian Football Confederation) Santos
14	FW	Fabiana	4 August 1989 (aged 21)	18	4	(Brazilian Football Confederation) Santos
15	MF	Francielle	18 October 1989 (aged 21)	15	5	(Brazilian Football Confederation) São José
16	DF	Elaine	1 November 1982 (aged 28)	18	4	(Swedish Football Association) Tyresö
17	FW	Daniele	2 April 1983 (aged 28)	12	3	(Brazilian Football Confederation) Vasco da Gama
18	FW	Thaisinha	20 January 1993 (aged 18)	5	0	(Brazilian Football Confederation) Bangu
19	FW	Grazielle	28 April 1981 (aged 30)	18	5	(Brazilian Football Confederation) America
20	DF	Roseane	23 July 1985 (aged 25)	12	0	(Brazilian Football Confederation) Bangu
21	GK	Thaís Picarte	19 June 1987 (aged 24)	12	0	(Brazilian Football Confederation) Bangu

=== Equatorial Guinea ===
Head coach: (Italy) Marcello Frigério

On 28 June 2011, Jade was suspended by the FIFA Disciplinary Committee due to eligibility issues, and was subsequently replaced by Emiliana Mangue.

No.	Pos.	Player	Date of birth (age)	Caps	Goals	Club
1	GK	Mirian	25 February 1982 (aged 29)	9	0	(Brazilian Football Confederation) São Francisco
2	DF	Bruna	12 May 1984 (aged 27)	8	0	(Brazilian Football Confederation) Rio Preto
3	DF	Dulce	18 January 1982 (aged 29)	3	0	(Brazilian Football Confederation) Centro Olímpico
4	DF	Carol Carioca	18 February 1983 (aged 28)	8	3	(Brazilian Football Confederation) Botucatu
5	MF	Cris	12 December 1985 (aged 25)	4	0	(Brazilian Football Confederation) Palmeiras
6	MF	Vânia (Note: Vânia was previously capped for the Brazil senior team.)	9 November 1980 (aged 30)	2	0	(Korea Football Association) Hyundai Steel Red Angels
7	FW	Blessing Diala	8 December 1989 (aged 21)	17	4	Unattached
8	FW	Emiliana Mangue	4 December 1991 (aged 19)	0	0	(Equatoguinean Football Federation) Waiso Ipola
9	MF	Dorine Chuigoué	28 November 1988 (aged 22)	12	8	(Equatoguinean Football Federation) Waiso Ipola
10	MF	Genoveva Añonman (captain)	19 April 1989 (aged 22)	28	15	(German Football Association) USV Jena
11	MF	Natalia Abeso	5 September 1986 (aged 24)	17	1	(Equatoguinean Football Federation) Inter Continental
12	MF	Sinforosa Eyang	26 April 1994 (aged 17)	14	6	(Equatoguinean Football Federation) Waiso Ipola
13	GK	Haoua Yao	2 July 1979 (aged 31)	9	0	(Burkinabé Football Federation) Princesses
14	MF	Jumária	8 May 1979 (aged 32)	13	1	(Brazilian Football Confederation) São Francisco
15	MF	Gloria Chinasa	8 December 1987 (aged 23)	17	9	(Nigeria Football Federation) Rivers Angels
16	MF	Lucrecia	24 October 1988 (aged 22)	6	1	(Equatoguinean Football Federation) Waiso Ipola
17	FW	Tiga	16 April 1983 (aged 28)	3	4	(Brazilian Football Confederation) UNIP (futsal)
18	GK	María Rosa	10 October 1982 (aged 28)	6	0	(Equatoguinean Football Federation) Inter Continental
19	FW	Fatoumata (Note: Fatoumata was previously capped for the Mali senior team.)	27 March 1989 (aged 22)	4	1	(Equatoguinean Football Federation) Inter Continental
20	MF	Christelle Nyepel	16 January 1995 (aged 16)	7	2	(Equatoguinean Football Federation) Waiso Ipola
21	DF	Laetitia Chapeh	7 April 1987 (aged 24)	2	0	(Equatoguinean Football Federation) Waiso Ipola

=== Norway ===
Head coach: Eli Landsem

The Norwegian team was announced on 27 May 2011. 19 places were named with two spots left open. After Lise Klaveness and Lene Storløkken were unable to play at the World Cup due to injuries, Landsem announced her squad on 11 June. Lisa-Marie Woods was replaced by Kristine Wigdahl Hegland due to a hip injury.

No.	Pos.	Player	Date of birth (age)	Caps	Goals	Club
1	GK	Ingrid Hjelmseth	10 April 1980 (aged 31)	44	0	(Norwegian Football Federation) Stabæk Fotball
2	DF	Nora Holstad Berge	26 March 1987 (aged 24)	5	0	(Swedish Football Association) Linköpings FC
3	DF	Maren Mjelde	6 November 1989 (aged 21)	31	1	(Norwegian Football Federation) Arna-Bjørnar
4	MF	Ingvild Stensland (captain)	3 August 1981 (aged 29)	101	5	(French Football Federation) Olympique Lyonnais
5	MF	Marita Skammelsrud Lund	29 January 1989 (aged 22)	19	0	(Norwegian Football Federation) LSK Kvinner FK
6	MF	Kristine Wigdahl Hegland	8 August 1992 (aged 18)	0	0	(Norwegian Football Federation) Arna-Bjornar
7	DF	Trine Rønning	14 June 1982 (aged 29)	111	15	(Norwegian Football Federation) Stabæk Fotball
8	DF	Runa Vikestad	13 August 1984 (aged 26)	14	1	(Norwegian Football Federation) Kolbotn Fotball
9	FW	Isabell Herlovsen	23 June 1988 (aged 23)	63	19	(Norwegian Football Federation) LSK Kvinner FK
10	FW	Cecilie Pedersen	14 September 1990 (aged 20)	20	8	(Norwegian Football Federation) Avaldsnes IL
11	MF	Leni Larsen Kaurin	21 March 1981 (aged 30)	80	4	(German Football Association) VfL Wolfsburg
12	GK	Erika Skarbø	12 June 1987 (aged 24)	15	0	(Norwegian Football Federation) Arna-Bjørnar
13	MF	Madeleine Giske	14 September 1987 (aged 23)	15	1	(Norwegian Football Federation) Arna-Bjørnar
14	MF	Gry Tofte Ims	2 March 1986 (aged 25)	7	0	(Norwegian Football Federation) Klepp IL
15	DF	Hedda Strand Gardsjord	28 June 1982 (aged 28)	22	0	(Norwegian Football Federation) Røa IL
16	FW	Elise Thorsnes	14 August 1988 (aged 22)	40	6	(Norwegian Football Federation) Røa IL
17	FW	Lene Mykjåland	20 February 1987 (aged 24)	35	8	(Norwegian Football Federation) Røa IL
18	MF	Guro Knutsen Mienna	10 January 1985 (aged 26)	27	3	(Norwegian Football Federation) Røa IL
19	FW	Emilie Haavi	16 June 1992 (aged 19)	7	4	(Norwegian Football Federation) Røa IL
20	DF	Ingrid Ryland	29 May 1989 (aged 22)	6	0	(Norwegian Football Federation) Arna-Bjørnar
21	GK	Caroline Knutsen	21 November 1983 (aged 27)	4	0	(Norwegian Football Federation) Røa IL
