= 2011 FIFA Women's World Cup Group D =

Football tournament group stage

Group D of the 2011 FIFA Women's World Cup consisted of the teams from Brazil, Australia, Norway and Equatorial Guinea. The games were played on 29 June, 3 July and 6 July 2011. The top two teams advanced to the knockout stage.

== Standings ==
Pos	Team	Pld	W	D	L	GF	GA	GD	Pts	Qualification
1	Brazil	3	3	0	0	7	0	+7	9	Advance to knockout stage
2	Australia	3	2	0	1	5	4	+1	6	Advance to knockout stage
3	Norway	3	1	0	2	2	5	−3	3	
4	Equatorial Guinea	3	0	0	3	2	7	−5	0	

Source: FIFA
Rules for classification: Group stage tiebreakers

== Matches ==
=== Norway vs Equatorial Guinea ===
29 June 2011
15:00

Norway	1–0	Equatorial Guinea
Haavi 84'	Report

Impuls Arena, Augsburg
Attendance: 12,928
Referee: Quetzalli Alvarado (Mexico)

Norway	Equatorial Guinea

NORWAY:
GK	1	Ingrid Hjelmseth
RB	15	Hedda Strand Gardsjord
CB	3	Maren Mjelde	(yellow card) 63'
CB	2	Nora Holstad Berge
LB	5	Marita Skammelsrud Lund
CM	7	Trine Bjerke Rønning
CM	4	Ingvild Stensland (c)
RW	16	Elise Thorsnes	(yellow card) 90+2'
AM	13	Madeleine Giske		(substituted off) 46'
LW	19	Emilie Haavi
CF	9	Isabell Herlovsen		(substituted off) 62'
Substitutions:
FW	17	Lene Mykjåland	(substituted in) 46'	(substituted off) 70'
MF	10	Cecilie Pedersen		(substituted in) 62'
MF	11	Leni Larsen Kaurin		(substituted in) 70'
Manager:
Eli Landsem

EQUATORIAL GUINEA:
GK	1	Mirian
RB	2	Bruna
CB	5	Cris
CB	4	Carol
LB	3	Dulce
RM	20	Christelle Nyepel	(substituted off) 46'
CM	14	Jumária	(substituted off) 52'
CM	6	Vânia
LM	9	Dorine Chuigoué
SS	10	Genoveva Añonman (c)
CF	7	Blessing Diala	(substituted off) 65'
Substitutions:
DF	21	Laetitia Chapeh	(substituted in) 46'
MF	15	Gloria Chinasa	(substituted in) 52'
FW	17	Tiga	(substituted in) 65'
Manager:
(Italy) Marcelo Frigerio

Player of the Match:
Ingrid Hjelmseth (Norway)

Assistant referees:
Rita Munoz (Mexico)
Mayte Chavez (Mexico)
Fourth official:
Finau Vulivuli (Fiji)

=== Brazil vs Australia ===
29 June 2011
18:15

Brazil	1–0	Australia
Rosana 54'	Report

Borussia-Park, Mönchengladbach
Attendance: 27,258
Referee: Jenny Palmqvist (Sweden)

Brazil	Australia

BRAZIL:
GK	1	Andréia
CB	4	Aline (c)
CB	3	Daiane
CB	13	Érika
RM	14	Fabiana
CM	8	Formiga	(substituted off) 84'
CM	7	Ester
LM	2	Maurine
RF	11	Cristiane
CF	6	Rosana
RF	10	Marta
Substitutions:
MF	15	Francielle	(substituted in) 84'
Manager:
Kleiton Lima

AUSTRALIA:
GK	1	Melissa Barbieri (c)
RB	9	Caitlin Foord
CB	10	Servet Uzunlar
CB	3	Kim Carroll
LB	8	Elise Kellond-Knight
CM	12	Emily van Egmond	(substituted off) 61'
CM	14	Collette McCallum
RW	13	Tameka Butt	(substituted off) 86'
LW	7	Heather Garriock
CF	17	Kyah Simon	(substituted off) 79'
CF	11	Lisa De Vanna
Substitutions:
MF	15	Sally Shipard	(substituted in) 61'
MF	20	Samantha Kerr	(substituted in) 79'
DF	4	Clare Polkinghorne	(substituted in) 86'
Manager:
(Scotland) Tom Sermanni

Player of the Match:
Rosana (Brazil)

Assistant referees:
Helen Karo (Sweden)
Anna Nyström (Sweden)
Fourth official:
Thalia Mitsi (Greece)

=== Australia vs Equatorial Guinea ===
3 July 2011
14:00

Australia	3–2	Equatorial Guinea
Khamis 8'; Van Egmond 48'; De Vanna 51'	Report	Añonman 21', 83'

Ruhrstadion, Bochum
Attendance: 15,640
Referee: Gyöngyi Gaál (Hungary)

Australia	Equatorial Guinea

AUSTRALIA:
GK	18	Lydia Williams
RB	16	Lauren Colthorpe
CB	10	Servet Uzunlar
CB	3	Kim Carroll
LB	8	Elise Kellond-Knight
RM	15	Sally Shipard		(substituted off) 46'
CM	14	Collette McCallum (c)		(substituted off) 78'
LM	12	Emily van Egmond
RF	20	Samantha Kerr		(substituted off) 69'
CF	19	Leena Khamis
LF	7	Heather Garriock
Substitutions:
FW	11	Lisa De Vanna	(yellow card) 72'	(substituted in) 46'
DF	2	Teigen Allen		(substituted in) 69'
DF	4	Clare Polkinghorne		(substituted in) 78'
Manager:
(Scotland) Tom Sermanni

EQUATORIAL GUINEA:
GK	1	Mirian
CB	2	Bruna		(substituted off) 83'
CB	4	Carol
CB	3	Dulce
RM	6	Vânia
CM	5	Cris	(yellow card) 46'
CM	14	Jumária		(substituted off) 66'
LM	9	Dorine Chuigoué
AM	7	Blessing Diala
AM	10	Genoveva Añonman (c)	(yellow card) 41'
CF	15	Gloria Chinasa		(substituted off) 57'
Substitutions:
FW	17	Tiga		(substituted in) 57'
MF	12	Sinforosa Nguema	(yellow card) 79'	(substituted in) 66'
DF	21	Laetitia Chapeh		(substituted in) 83'
Manager:
(Italy) Marcelo Frigerio

Player of the Match:
Lisa De Vanna (Australia)

Assistant referees:
Cristina Cini (Italy)
Nathalie Walker (England)
Fourth official:
Bibiana Steinhaus (Germany)

=== Brazil vs Norway ===
3 July 2011
18:15

Brazil	3–0	Norway
Marta 22', 48'; Rosana 46'	Report

Volkswagen Arena, Wolfsburg
Attendance: 26,067
Referee: Kari Seitz (United States)

Brazil	Norway

BRAZIL:
GK	1	Andréia
CB	4	Aline (c)
CB	3	Daiane	(yellow card) 19'	(substituted off) 85'
CB	13	Érika
CM	8	Formiga
CM	7	Ester		(substituted off) 89'
RM	14	Fabiana		(substituted off) 76'
LM	2	Maurine
AM	11	Cristiane
AM	10	Marta
CF	6	Rosana
Substitutions:
MF	15	Francielle		(substituted in) 76'
MF	5	Renata Costa		(substituted in) 85'
MF	19	Grazielle		(substituted in) 89'
Manager:
Kleiton Lima

NORWAY:
GK	1	Ingrid Hjelmseth
RB	5	Marita Skammelsrud Lund
CB	3	Maren Mjelde
CB	2	Nora Holstad Berge
LB	18	Guro Knutsen
CM	4	Ingvild Stensland (c)	(substituted off) 67'
CM	7	Trine Bjerke Rønning
RW	11	Leni Larsen Kaurin	(substituted off) 46'
AM	13	Madeleine Giske
LW	19	Emilie Haavi	(substituted off) 52'
CF	9	Isabell Herlovsen
Substitutions:
FW	16	Elise Thorsnes	(substituted in) 46'
FW	10	Cecilie Pedersen	(substituted in) 52'
MF	14	Gry Tofte Ims	(substituted in) 67'
Manager:
Eli Landsem

Player of the Match:
Marta (Brazil)

Assistant referees:
Marlene Duffy (United States)
Veronica Perez (United States)
Fourth official:
Carol Anne Chenard (Canada)

=== Equatorial Guinea vs Brazil ===
6 July 2011
18:00

Equatorial Guinea	0–3	Brazil
	Report	Érika 49'; Cristiane 54', 90+3' (pen.)

Waldstadion, Frankfurt
Attendance: 35,859
Referee: Bibiana Steinhaus (Germany)

Equatorial Guinea	Brazil

EQUATORIAL GUINEA:
GK	1	Mirian
RB	2	Bruna	(yellow card) 90+2'
CB	21	Laetitia Chapeh
CB	4	Carol
LB	3	Dulce	(yellow card) 9'
CM	5	Cris		(substituted off) 71'
CM	14	Jumária
RW	6	Vânia
AM	10	Genoveva Añonman (c)
LW	9	Dorine Chuigoué
CF	7	Blessing Diala	(yellow card) 60'	(substituted off) 86'
Substitutions:
MF	12	Sinforosa Nguema		(substituted in) 71'
FW	17	Tiga		(substituted in) 86'
Manager:
(Italy) Marcelo Frigerio

BRAZIL:
GK	1	Andréia
CB	13	Érika
CB	5	Renata Costa	(yellow card) 77'
CB	4	Aline (c)
CM	8	Formiga		(substituted off) 90'
CM	7	Ester
RM	14	Fabiana		(substituted off) 82'
LM	2	Maurine
AM	11	Cristiane
AM	10	Marta
CF	6	Rosana		(substituted off) 70'
Substitutions:
MF	15	Francielle	(yellow card) 74'	(substituted in) 70'
FW	18	Thaisinha		(substituted in) 82'
MF	9	Bia Zaneratto		(substituted in) 90'
Manager:
Kleiton Lima

Player of the Match:
Érika (Brazil)

Assistant referees:
Marina Wozniak (Germany)
Katrin Rafalski (Germany)
Fourth official:
Kateryna Monzul (Ukraine)

=== Australia vs Norway ===
6 July 2011
18:00

Australia	2–1	Norway
Simon 57', 87'	Report	Thorsnes 56'

BayArena, Leverkusen
Attendance: 18,474
Referee: Estela Álvarez (Argentina)

Australia	Norway

AUSTRALIA:
GK	1	Melissa Barbieri (c)
RB	9	Caitlin Foord		(substituted off) 89'
CB	3	Kim Carroll	(yellow card) 45+2'
CB	10	Servet Uzunlar
LB	8	Elise Kellond-Knight
CM	14	Collette McCallum
CM	4	Clare Polkinghorne
RW	20	Samantha Kerr		(substituted off) 81'
AM	11	Lisa De Vanna
LW	7	Heather Garriock	(yellow card) 68'
CF	17	Kyah Simon
Substitutions:
DF	5	Laura Alleway		(substituted in) 81'
DF	6	Ellyse Perry		(substituted in) 89'
Manager:
(Scotland) Tom Sermanni

NORWAY:
GK	1	Ingrid Hjelmseth		(substituted off) 46'
RB	15	Hedda Strand Gardsjord	(yellow card) 90+2'
CB	7	Trine Bjerke Rønning
CB	3	Maren Mjelde
LB	18	Guro Knutsen		(substituted off) 46'
CM	4	Ingvild Stensland (c)
CM	14	Gry Tofte Ims		(substituted off) 82'
RW	19	Emilie Haavi
AM	17	Lene Mykjåland
LW	16	Elise Thorsnes
CF	10	Cecilie Pedersen
Substitutions:
MF	6	Kristine Wigdahl Hegland		(substituted in) 46'
GK	12	Erika Skarbø		(substituted in) 46'
FW	9	Isabell Herlovsen		(substituted in) 82'
Manager:
Eli Landsem

Player of the Match:
Kyah Simon (Australia)

Assistant referees:
Maria Rocco (Argentina)
Yoly García (Venezuela)
Fourth official:
Silvia Reyes (Peru)

== See also ==
- Australia at the FIFA Women's World Cup
- Brazil at the FIFA Women's World Cup
- Equatorial Guinea at the FIFA Women's World Cup
- Norway at the FIFA Women's World Cup
