= 2012 African Women's Championship squads =

This article describes the squads for the 2012 African Women's Championship.

== Group A ==
=== DR Congo ===
Head coach: Gauthier Muzangi

No.	Pos.	Player	Date of birth (age)	Caps	Club
1	GK	Stéphanie Mbole	10 October 1990 (aged 22)		(Democratic Republic of the Congo) Force Terrestre
2	FW	Jolie Tuzolana	6 April 1986 (aged 26)		(Democratic Republic of the Congo) Force Terrestre
3	DF	Lucie Nona	15 July 1991 (aged 21)		(Democratic Republic of the Congo) Force Terrestre
4	DF	Pitshou Tezi	4 February 1989 (aged 23)		(Democratic Republic of the Congo) Grand Hotel
5	FW	Sophie Basenga	9 September 1993 (aged 19)		(Democratic Republic of the Congo) 31e Communauté
6	MF	Laurène Lusilawu	9 September 1993 (aged 19)		(Democratic Republic of the Congo) FC Solidarité
7	DF	Mwalutshe Bwadi	5 May 1996 (aged 16)		(Democratic Republic of the Congo) FC Bana Mazembe
8	DF	Charlène Diantesa	23 August 1990 (aged 22)		(Democratic Republic of the Congo) Grand Hotel
9	FW	Isa Diakese	12 December 1992 (aged 19)		(Democratic Republic of the Congo) Grand Hotel
10	FW	Falonne Pambani	2 August 1994 (aged 18)		(Democratic Republic of the Congo) Grand Hotel
11	DF	Nanouche Lumbu	4 December 1988 (aged 23)		(Democratic Republic of the Congo) Force Terrestre
12	MF	Carine Panda	20 February 1990 (aged 22)		(Democratic Republic of the Congo) Force Terrestre
13	FW	Charmante Nsimba	3 March 1989 (aged 23)		(Democratic Republic of the Congo) Grand Hotel
14	MF	Mireille Kuyangisa	1 January 1989 (aged 23)		(Democratic Republic of the Congo) Force Terrestre
15	DF	Lina Mpele	10 September 1992 (aged 20)		(Democratic Republic of the Congo) Grand Hotel
16	GK	Fideline Ngoy	31 March 1991 (aged 21)		(Democratic Republic of the Congo) Force Terrestre
17	FW	Pamela Malembo	9 April 1989 (aged 23)		(Democratic Republic of the Congo) Grand Hotel
18	MF	Judith Tondo	20 June 1988 (aged 24)		(Democratic Republic of the Congo) Grand Hotel
19	MF	Arlette Mafuta	3 September 1989 (aged 23)		(Democratic Republic of the Congo) Grand Hotel
20	DF	Gisèle Bosimba	10 April 1988 (aged 24)		(Democratic Republic of the Congo) Grand Hotel
21	GK	Laurette Kondolo	23 December 1990 (aged 21)		(Democratic Republic of the Congo) Grand Hotel

=== Equatorial Guinea ===
Head coach: Esteban Becker

No.	Pos.	Player	Date of birth (age)	Caps	Club
1	GK	Mirian Silva de Paixão	25 February 1982 (aged 30)		(Brazil) SAO FRANCISCO
2	DF	Adriana Parente	14 April 1980 (aged 32)		(Brazil) SAO FRANCISCO
3	DF	Ghyslaine Nke	8 June 1989 (aged 23)		(Equatorial Guinea) E. WAISO IPOLA
4	DF	Carolina Conceição Martins Pereira	18 February 1983 (aged 29)		(South Korea) CHUNGBUK SPOR
5	MF	Ana Cristina da Silva	12 December 1985 (aged 26)		(Brazil) XV DE NOVEMBRE
6	DF	Vânia Cristina Martins	9 November 1980 (aged 31)		(Brazil) SAO CAETNO JUVEN
7	MF	Mariana Isabel Machado Silva	24 February 1994 (aged 18)		(Equatorial Guinea) E. WAISO IPOLA
8	FW	Jade Boho	30 August 1986 (aged 26)		(Spain) RAYO VALECANO
9	DF	Dorine Chuigoué	28 November 1988 (aged 23)		(Serbia) SPARTAK FC
10	FW	Genoveva Añonma	19 April 1989 (aged 23)		(Germany) POTSDAM
11	MF	Camila do Carmo Nobre de Oliveira	10 July 1994 (aged 18)		(Equatorial Guinea) E. WAISO IPOLA
12	MF	Sinforosa Nguema	26 April 1994 (aged 18)		(Equatorial Guinea) E. WAISO IPOLA
13	GK	Pauline Tala	29 May 1994 (aged 18)		(Equatorial Guinea) E. WAISO IPOLA
14	MF	Jumária Barbosa de Santana	8 May 1979 (aged 33)		(Brazil) SAO FRANCISCO
15	FW	Gloria Chinasa	8 December 1987 (aged 24)		(Poland) UNIA RACIBOS
16	DF	Dúlcia Maria Davi	18 January 1982 (aged 30)		(Brazil) XV DE NOVEMBRE
17	FW	Adriana Aparecida Costa	16 April 1983 (aged 29)		(Brazil) A. PORTUGUESA
18	GK	Emiliana Ndong	24 October 1986 (aged 26)		(Equatorial Guinea) E. WAISO IPOLA
19	DF	Bruna Amarante da Silva	12 May 1984 (aged 28)		(Kazakhstan) FC BIIK
20	MF	Christelle Nyepel	16 January 1995 (aged 17)		(Equatorial Guinea) E. WAISO IPOLA
21	MF	Laetitia Chapeh	7 April 1987 (aged 25)		(Poland) MENDYK KONIN

=== Senegal ===
Head coach: Bassouaré Diaby

No.	Pos.	Player	Date of birth (age)	Caps	Club
1	GK	Mariane Fall	6 August 1981 (aged 31)		(Senegal) Aigles Médina
2	MF	Ngouye Sarr	12 September 1986 (aged 26)		(Senegal) Tigresses Grand Yoff
3	MF	Fatou Sene	18 November 1989 (aged 22)		(Senegal) Médiour Rufisque
4	MF	Aminata Diadhiou	2 November 1987 (aged 24)		(France) FF Issy
5	DF	Bineta Sylla	20 September 1977 (aged 35)		(Senegal) Sirènes Grand Yoff
6	MF	Mareme Yally	26 May 1988 (aged 24)		(Senegal) Aigles Médina
7	FW	Maty Diop	4 January 1988 (aged 24)		(Senegal) Aigles Médina
8	DF	Absa Diop	28 April 1984 (aged 28)		(Senegal) Lycée Ameth Fall
9	FW	Korka Fall	19 February 1990 (aged 22)		(Senegal) Dorades Mbour
10	FW	Fatou Faye	6 January 1975 (aged 37)		(Senegal) Tigresses Grand Yoff
11	FW	Mamy Ndiaye	26 November 1986 (aged 25)		(Sweden) IFK Kalmar
12	MF	Khady Sall	2 June 1987 (aged 25)		(Senegal) Aigles Médina
13	DF	Mbayang Thiam	17 December 1982 (aged 29)		(Senegal) Aigles Médina
14	FW	Fanta Sy	2 November 1991 (aged 20)		(Senegal) Amazones Yeumbeul
15	DF	Mame Diagne	20 March 1989 (aged 23)		(Senegal) Tigresses Grand Yoff
16	GK	Ouleye Dieye	9 January 1986 (aged 26)		(Senegal) Sirènes Grand Yoff
17	DF	Mbayang Sow	21 January 1993 (aged 19)		(Senegal) Aigles Médina
18	MF	Safietou Sagna	11 April 1994 (aged 18)		(Senegal) Casa Sport
19	FW	Mame Thiaw	11 November 1986 (aged 25)		(Senegal) Sirènes Grand Yoff
20	FW	Mariama Diedhiou	26 March 1989 (aged 23)		(Senegal) Sirènes Grand Yoff
21	GK	Arame Thiandoum	6 December 1994 (aged 17)		(Senegal) Amazones Grand Yoff

=== South Africa ===
Head coach: Joseph Mkhonza

No.	Pos.	Player	Date of birth (age)	Caps	Club
1	GK	Andile Dlamini	2 September 1992 (aged 20)		(South Africa) Sundowns Ladies FC
2	DF	Lebogang Mabatle	3 March 1992 (aged 20)		(South Africa) Halleluyah Zebra Force
3	DF	Nothando Vilakazi	28 October 1988 (aged 24)		(South Africa) Palace Super Falcons
4	DF	Amanda Sister	1 March 1990 (aged 22)		(South Africa) Liverpool Ladies FC
5	DF	Janine van Wyk	17 April 1987 (aged 25)		(South Africa) Palace Super Falcons
6	DF	Zamandosi Cele	26 December 1990 (aged 21)		(South Africa) Durban Ladies FC
7	MF	Leandra Smeda	22 July 1989 (aged 23)		(South Africa) Cape Town Roses FC
9	MF	Amanda Dlamini	22 July 1988 (aged 24)		(South Africa) UJ Ladies FC
10	FW	Silindile Ngubane	25 March 1987 (aged 25)		(South Africa) Durban Ladies FC
11	FW	Noko Matlou	30 September 1985 (aged 27)		(South Africa) UJ Ladies FC
12	FW	Portia Modise	20 June 1983 (aged 29)		(South Africa) Palace Super Falcons
13	DF	Gabisile Hlumbane	20 December 1986 (aged 25)		(South Africa) Kovsies Ladies FC
14	FW	Sanah Mollo	30 January 1987 (aged 25)		(South Africa) Bloemfontein Celtics Ladies
15	MF	Refiloe Jane	4 August 1992 (aged 20)		(South Africa) Sundowns Ladies FC
16	GK	Thokozile Mndaweni	8 August 1981 (aged 31)		(South Africa) UJ Ladies FC
17	FW	Andisiwe Mgcoyi	16 June 1988 (aged 24)		(South Africa) Sundowns Ladies FC
18	MF	Nocawe Skiti	13 May 1989 (aged 23)		(South Africa) Cape Town Roses FC
19	MF	Charlotte Mshengu	4 December 1989 (aged 22)		(South Africa) Durban Ladies FC
20	FW	Jermaine Seoposenwe	12 October 1993 (aged 19)		(South Africa) Spurs WFC
21	GK	Katlego Moletsane	3 March 1995 (aged 17)		(South Africa) High Performance Centre

== Group B ==
=== Cameroon ===
Head coach: Enow Ngachu

No.	Pos.	Player	Date of birth (age)	Caps	Club
1	GK	Annette Ngo Ndom	2 June 1985 (aged 27)		(Cameroon) LOUVES MINPROFF YAOUNDE
2	DF	Christine Manie	4 May 1984 (aged 28)		(Romania) NEGREA RISITA
3	MF	Yvonne Leuko	20 November 1991 (aged 20)		(France) Montigny le Bretonneux
4	DF	Rosine Siewe Yamaleu	25 November 1991 (aged 20)		(Cameroon) Franck Rohliceck S.A
5	DF	Agnès Nkada	12 March 1995 (aged 17)		(Cameroon) CANON FILLES
6	MF	Francine Zouga	9 November 1987 (aged 24)		(Switzerland) AIRE–LE LIGNON
7	FW	Gabrielle Onguéné	25 February 1989 (aged 23)		(Cameroon) LOUVES MINPROFF YAOUNDE
8	MF	Raissa Feudjio	29 October 1995 (aged 16)		(Cameroon) LOREMA FC YAOUNDE
9	FW	Gabrielle Ngaska	14 April 1988 (aged 24)		(Cameroon) LOREMA FC YAOUNDE
10	FW	Henriette Akaba	7 June 1992 (aged 20)		(Cameroon) LOREMA FC YAOUNDE
11	FW	Adrienne Iven	9 March 1983 (aged 29)		(Cameroon) LOUVES MINPROFF YAOUNDE
12	MF	Françoise Bella	9 March 1983 (aged 29)		(Nigeria) RIVERS ANGELS
13	DF	Claudine Meffometou	1 July 1990 (aged 22)		(Cameroon) Franck Rohliceck S.A
14	DF	Bibi Medoua	9 August 1993 (aged 19)		(Cameroon) AS LOCOMOTIVE YAOUNDE
15	DF	Ysis Sonkeng	20 September 1989 (aged 23)		(Cameroon) LOUVES MINPROFF YAOUNDE
16	GK	Reine Sosso	19 March 1993 (aged 19)		(Cameroon) Franck Rohliceck S.A
17	FW	Gaëlle Enganamouit	9 June 1992 (aged 20)		(Poland) ZFK SPARTAK
18	MF	Jacquette Ada	27 August 1991 (aged 21)		
19	MF	Carine Yoh	10 April 1993 (aged 19)		(Cameroon) Franck Rohliceck S.A
20	MF	Annecy Nguiadem Kamdem	4 April 1994 (aged 18)		(Cameroon) AS LOCOMOTIVE
21	GK	Adrienne Ndongo Fouda	15 June 1990 (aged 22)		(Belarus) MINSK

=== Ethiopia ===
Head coach: Abreham Teklehaymanot Kahsay

No.	Pos.	Player	Date of birth (age)	Caps	Goals	Club
1	GK	Liya Ossa	9 October 1984 (aged 28)			(Ethiopian Football Federation) Dedebit FC
18	GK	Dagmawet Bekele	19 July 1988 (aged 24)			(Ethiopian Football Federation) CBE SA
21	GK	Israel Gebru	28 December 1988 (aged 23)			(Ethiopian Football Federation) Ethiopian Coffee FC
3	DF	Woinshet Desta	20 January 1986 (aged 26)			(Ethiopian Football Federation) Dedebit FC
4	DF	Tiruanchi Sisay	7 January 1987 (aged 25)			(Ethiopian Football Federation) CBE SA
5	DF	Kelem Mamuye	10 October 1994 (aged 18)			
14	DF	Hiwot Buwli	24 February 1992 (aged 20)			(Ethiopian Football Federation) CBE SA
17	DF	Bezuhan Alemar	15 January 1986 (aged 26)			(Ethiopian Football Federation) CBE SA
20	DF	Adanech Adere	20 November 1990 (aged 21)			(Ethiopian Football Federation) Ethiopian Coffee FC
2	MF	Eden Negeri	6 April 1990 (aged 22)			(Ethiopian Football Federation) Dedebit FC
6	MF	Tutu Melaku	8 July 1986 (aged 26)			(Ethiopian Football Federation) CBE SA
7	MF	Zulka Badega	21 July 1988 (aged 24)			(Ethiopian Football Federation) CBE SA
8	MF	Aynalem Gebra	4 January 1994 (aged 18)			(Ethiopian Football Federation) CBE SA
12	MF	Berktawit Aboye	17 August 1988 (aged 24)			(Ethiopian Football Federation) Dedebit FC
15	MF	Kidest Endale	18 July 1989 (aged 23)			(Ethiopian Football Federation) Dedebit FC
19	MF	Akberet Hadera	18 May 1994 (aged 18)			(Ethiopian Football Federation) CBE SA
9	FW	Erehima Biza	11 September 1987 (aged 25)			(Ethiopian Football Federation) CBE SA
10	FW	Shetaye Abaa	30 June 1988 (aged 24)			(Ethiopian Football Federation) CBE SA
11	FW	Birtukan Ware	30 November 1988 (aged 23)			(Ethiopian Football Federation) Dedebit FC
13	FW	Bezunesh Aba	24 April 1991 (aged 21)			(Ethiopian Football Federation) CBE SA
16	FW	Helen Bekele	26 July 1987 (aged 25)			

=== Ivory Coast ===
Head coach: Clémentine Touré

No.	Pos.	Player	Date of birth (age)	Caps	Club
1	GK	Lydie Saki	22 December 1984 (aged 27)		(Ivory Coast) Juventus
2	DF	Fatou Coulibaly	13 February 1987 (aged 25)		(Ivory Coast) Juventus
3	DF	Djelika Coulibaly	22 February 1984 (aged 28)		(Ivory Coast) Juventus
4	MF	Mariam Sanogo	18 April 1990 (aged 22)		(Ivory Coast) Onze Sœurs
5	MF	Jeanne Gnago	18 April 1984 (aged 28)		(Ivory Coast) Juventus
6	MF	Rita Akaffou	5 December 1986 (aged 25)		(Ivory Coast) Juventus
7	MF	Nadege Essoh	5 May 1990 (aged 22)		(Ivory Coast) Juventus
8	FW	Inès Tia	1 October 1993 (aged 19)		(Ivory Coast) Juventus
9	FW	Rachel Bancouly	11 April 1983 (aged 29)		(Ivory Coast) Juventus
10	MF	Nadège Koffi	26 August 1989 (aged 23)		(Ivory Coast) Juventus
11	FW	Rebecca Elloh	25 December 1994 (aged 17)		(Ivory Coast) Onze Sœurs
12	DF	Rebecca Guehai	15 July 1994 (aged 18)		(Ivory Coast) Juventus
13	DF	Fernande Tchetche	20 June 1988 (aged 24)		(Ivory Coast) Omness
14	FW	Josée Nahi	29 May 1989 (aged 23)		(Ivory Coast) Omness
15	MF	Christine Lohoues	18 October 1992 (aged 20)		(Ivory Coast) Onze Sœurs
16	GK	Dominique Thiamale	20 May 1982 (aged 30)		(Ivory Coast) Omness
17	FW	Ange N'Guessan	18 November 1990 (aged 21)		(Ivory Coast) Omness
18	DF	Madjoh Dosso	23 July 1986 (aged 26)		(Ivory Coast) Onze Sœurs
19	DF	Raymonde Kacou	7 January 1987 (aged 25)		(Ivory Coast) Juventus
20	DF	Lynda Gauzé	11 June 1990 (aged 22)		(Ivory Coast) Stella Club
21	GK	Cynthia Djohore	16 December 1987 (aged 24)		(Ivory Coast) Onze Sœurs

=== Nigeria ===
Head coach: Kadiri Ikhana

No.	Pos.	Player	Date of birth (age)	Caps	Club
1	GK	Precious Dede	18 January 1980 (aged 32)		(Nigeria) BAYELSA QUEENS
2	DF	Evelyn Nwabuoku	14 November 1985 (aged 26)		(Nigeria) RIVERS ANGELS
3	DF	Ngozi Ebere	5 August 1991 (aged 21)		(Nigeria) RIVERS ANGELS
4	FW	Perpetua Nkwocha	3 January 1976 (aged 36)		(Sweden) SUNNANA FC
5	DF	Onome Ebi	8 May 1983 (aged 29)		(Turkey) ATASEHIR
6	DF	Gladys Akpa	1 January 1986 (aged 26)		(Nigeria) SUNSHINE QUEENS
7	MF	Stella Mbachu	16 April 1978 (aged 34)		(Nigeria) RIVERS ANGELS
8	MF	Martina Ohadugha	5 May 1991 (aged 21)		(Nigeria) RIVERS ANGELS
9	FW	Emueje Ogbiagbevha	10 February 1990 (aged 22)		(Kazakhstan) TEO-PFC B.I.I.K.
10	MF	Rita Chikwelu	6 March 1988 (aged 24)		(Sweden) UMEALK FC
11	MF	Glory Iroka	3 January 1990 (aged 22)		(Nigeria) RIVERS ANGELS
12	DF	Josephine Chukwunonye	19 March 1992 (aged 20)		(Nigeria) RIVERS ANGELS
13	FW	Ngozi Okobi	14 December 1993 (aged 18)		(Nigeria) DELTA QUEENS
14	MF	Esther Sunday	13 March 1992 (aged 20)		(Nigeria) SUNSHINE QUEENS
15	DF	Joy Jegede	16 December 1991 (aged 20)		(Nigeria) DELTA QUEENS
16	GK	Tochukwu Oluehi	2 May 1987 (aged 25)		(Nigeria) SUNSHINE QUEENS
17	MF	Asisat Oshoala	9 October 1994 (aged 18)		(Nigeria) RIVERS ANGELS
18	DF	Helen Ukaonu	17 May 1991 (aged 21)		(Sweden) SUNNANA FC
19	FW	Ebere Orji	23 December 1992 (aged 19)		(Nigeria) RIVERS ANGELS
20	MF	Ogonna Chukwudi	14 September 1988 (aged 24)		(Sweden) UMEALK FC
21	GK	Ibubeleye Whyte	9 January 1992 (aged 20)		(Nigeria) RIVERS ANGELS
