= María Rosa =

María Rosa may refer to:

- Maria Rosa (1916 film), a 1916 silent drama film directed by Cecil B. DeMille
- María Rosa (1946 film), a 1946 Argentine film
- María Rosa, búscame una esposa, a Peruvian telenovela

== People ==
- María Jesús Rosa (several people)
- Maria Rosa Agostini, Italian mystic
- Maria Rosa Antognazza (1964–2023), Italian-British philosopher
- María Rosa Calviño de Gómez, Argentine politician
- Maria Rosa Candido (1967–1993), Italian speed skater
- Maria Rosa Coccia (1759–1833), Italian harpsichordist and composer
- Maria Rosa Colaço (1935–2004), Portuguese writer, educationalist and journalist
- Maria Rosa Cutrufelli, Italian writer
- María Rosa Díaz (born 1953), Argentine politician
- María Rosa Gallo (1925–2004), Argentine actress
- María Rosa de Gálvez (1768–1806), Spanish poet and playwright
- María Rosa Leggol (1926–2020), Franciscan religious sister
- María Rosa Lida de Malkiel (1910–1962), Argentine philologist
- María Rosa de Madariaga (1937–2022), Spanish historian
- Maria Rosa Marco Poquet, better known by her stage name Salomé (singer) (born 1939), Spanish singer
- María Rosa Martínez (born 1955), Argentine politician
- María Rosa Menocal (1953–2012), Cuban-born American medieval historian
- Maria Rosa Miracle Solé (1945–2017), Spanish ecologist
- María Rosa Oliver (1898–1977), Argentine writer
- María Rosa Ondo (born 1982), Equatoguinean footballer
- Maria Rosa Quario (born 1961), Italian alpine skier
- Maria Rosa Ribas Monné (1944–2024), Catalan composer and pianist
- María Rosa Salgado (1929–1995), Spanish actress
- María Rosa Urraca Pastor (1900–1984), Spanish politician
- Maria Rosa Virós i Galtier (1935–2010), Spanish lawyer and academic
- Maria Rosa Viseu (1935–2014), Portuguese anti-fascist
- María Rosa Yorio (born 1954), Argentine artist and musician

== See also ==
- María Jesús Rosa (disambiguation)
