= Skarbø =

Skarbø is a Norwegian surname. Notable people with the surname include:

- Erika Skarbø (born 1987), Norwegian footballer
- Øyvind Skarbø (born 1982), Norwegian drummer and composer
