= Marit Fiane Grødum =

Norwegian footballer (born 1980)

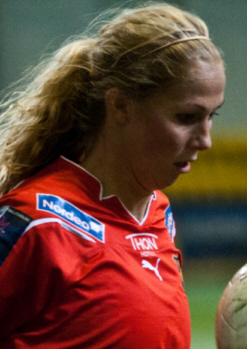

Personal information
- Full name: Marit Helene Fiane Grødum
- Birth name: Marit Helene Fiane Christensen
- Date of birth: 11 December 1980 (age 45)
- Place of birth: Vestby, Norway
- Height: 1.76 m (5 ft 9 in)
- Position: Centre back

Youth career
- Halsen IF

Senior career*
Years	Team	Apps	(Gls)
2000–2002	Larvik	0	(0)
2003	Asker	17	(3)
2004–2010	Røa	111	(22)
2011–	Amazon Grimstad	32	(5)

International career^{‡}
2003–	Norway	86	(12)
Medal record
Women's football
Representing Norway
UEFA Women's Championship
Silver medal – second place	2005 England	Team
Silver medal – second place	2013 Sweden	Team
- * Club domestic league appearances and goals ‡ National team caps and goals as of 14:16, 21 September 2014 (UTC)

Marit Helene Fiane Grødum (née Christensen; born 11 December 1980) is a Norwegian former football central back. Christensen married Øystein Grødum on 31 August 2013 and changed her name to Marit Helene Fiane Grødum. Her last club was Amazon Grimstad of Norway's Toppserien league. She was member of the Norway women's national football team, having made her debut on 16 March 2003, in a match against the United States.

== Club career ==
She started her career in Halsen IF, a local club in Larvik. As the women's teams of Halsen and rival club Nanset IF joined into one club, FK Larvik, Grødum became one of the key players of the club. Both she and the club made a Toppserien debut in 2000. Grødum scored one goal, but could not help the club avoid relegation. In 2002, Larvik and Grødum returned to Toppserien. Even though Larvik survived their second encounter with Toppserien, Grødum changed team to Asker. The stay in Asker was short, as only one year later Grødum continued her way east and ended up in Røa. Grødum proved to be vital to the club. In her first season in Røa, her team won the double, both the league and the cup. Over the next years, Røa with Grødum won the league and the cup twice each.

== International career ==
Grødum also became an important part of the national team. When she quit the national team in October 2008, Grødum had made 62 appearances, scoring seven goals. She scored her first goal for Norway on 24 July 2004 in a match against Sweden.

She was part of the squad for the 2005 European Championships, in which Norway claimed silver, falling to Germany 3–1 in the championship match. She was also part of the team for the 2003 Women's World Cup, 2007 Women's World Cup and the 2008 Summer Olympics held in Beijing, China.

On 21 October 2008 Grødum and four other Røa players – Marie Knutsen, Guro Knutsen, Lene Mykjåland and Siri Nordby – made headlines when they announced in a press release that they would not be returning to the national team due to issues the five had with the national team leadership. While the press statement never mentioned coach Bjarne Berntsen's name, it was assumed that he was instrumental in their decision to quit the team. The retirement, interpreted by newspapers as a boycott, created widespread media attention.

Somewhat involuntarily, Grødum became the spokesperson for the five players, especially in a TV-debate with the Norwegian Football Association and coach Bjarne Berntsen. As of January 2009, the issue seemed far from soluble, but with Bjarne Berntsen's retirement and the arrival of a new chief trainer for the national team, Eli Landsem, Grødum was recalled to the side in December 2009 for training matches against China and England in La Manga Club, Spain in January 2010.

Veteran national coach Even Pellerud selected Grødum in Norway's squad for UEFA Women's Euro 2013 in Sweden. She started the final at Friends Arena, where Anja Mittag's goal gave the Germans their sixth successive European title.

== Personal ==
Grødum is a qualified lawyer and works as a legal adviser to NISO, the Norske Idrettsutøveres Sentralorganisasjon. Norwegian World Cup speed-skater winner Øystein Grødum and Marit became a couple the summer of 2006. Their first child was born in autumn, 2010.

== Career statistics ==
Statistics accurate as of match played 8 June 2013

Club	Season	Division	League		Cup		Total	
Club	Season	Division	Apps	Goals	Apps	Goals	Apps	Goals
2003	Asker	Toppserien	17	3	2	0	19	3
2004	Røa	Toppserien	17	6	3	1	20	7
2005	Røa	Toppserien	17	1	4	0	21	1
2006	Røa	Toppserien	15	6	5	4	20	10
2007	Røa	Toppserien	22	3	3	2	25	5
2008	Røa	Toppserien	19	4	7	1	26	5
2009	Røa	Toppserien	20	2	0	0	20	2
2010	Røa	Toppserien	1	0	2	0	3	0
2011	Amazon Grimstad	Toppserien	7	0	0	0	7	0
2012	Amazon Grimstad	Toppserien	15	3	3	0	18	3
2013	Amazon Grimstad	Toppserien	10	2	0	0	10	2
Career Total			160	30	29	7	189	38

== Honors ==
Røa

- Toppserien: Winner 2004, 2007, 2008, 2009
- Norwegian Women's Cup: Winner 2004, 2006, 2008, 2009, 2010

=== Country ===
Norway

- 2003 FIFA Women's World Cup: Quarter-final
- 2007 FIFA Women's World Cup: Fourth place
- 2008 Summer Olympics in Beijing: Quarter-final
- UEFA Women's Euro 2005: Runners-up
- UEFA Women's Euro 2013: Runners-up

=== Individual ===
- UEFA Women's Championship All-Star Team: 2013
