= Marie Knutsen =

Norwegian footballer (born 1982)

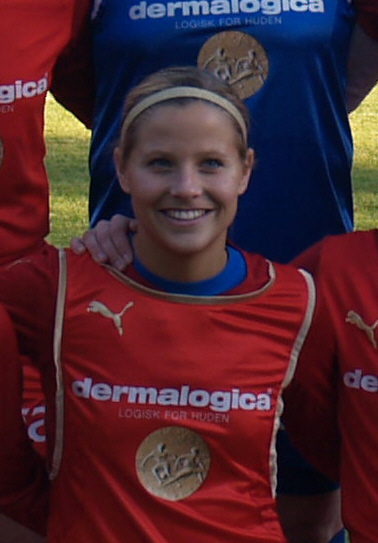

Personal information
- Full name: Marie Lindebø Knutsen
- Date of birth: 31 August 1982 (age 44)
- Place of birth: Trondheim, Norway
- Height: 1.67 m (5 ft 6 in)
- Position: Midfielder

Youth career
- Flatås
- Byåsen

Senior career*
Years	Team	Apps	(Gls)
2000–2001	Byåsen		
2002–2003	Trondheims-Ørn		
2004–2005	Kattem		
2006–2009	Røa		
2011	Rovers (New York)		
2012	Røa		

International career^{‡}
2005–2009	Norway	55	(6)
- * Club domestic league appearances and goals ‡ National team caps and goals as of 19 January 2009

Marie Lindebø Knutsen (born 31 August 1982) is a Norwegian former football midfielder who played for Røa of Norway's Toppserien league and represented the Norwegian national team from 2005 to 2009.

== Club career ==
Aside from Røa IL, Knutsen has also played for Kattem IL, Flatås, Byåsen and Trondheims-Ørn. She was named as part of the NISO Women's Team of the Year in 2007.

After missing 2010 and 2011 through giving birth and moving away to America, Knutsen returned to Røa in 2012. She retired from football ahead of the club's 2013 Toppserien campaign.

== National team ==
Knutsen made her debut for the senior national team on 19 February 2005 in a match against France. Her first goal came on 20 January 2006 in a match against China.

She was part of the squad for the 2007 Women's World Cup, playing in five matches, as well as the 2008 Summer Olympics held in Beijing, China, where she appeared in three matches. Knutsen also played in the 2005 European Championships, winning the silver medal after Norway lost 3–1 to Germany in the final at Ewood Park, Blackburn.

On 21 October 2008 Marie Knutsen and four other Røa players—Lene Mykjåland, Guro Knutsen, Marit Fiane Christensen and Siri Nordby—made headlines when they announced in a press release that they would not be returning to the national team due to issues the five had with the national team leadership. While the press statement never mentioned coach Bjarne Berntsen's name, it was assumed that he was instrumental in their decision to retire from the team. The retirement, construed in many newspapers as a boycott, created widespread media attention.

Berntsen's successor Eli Landsem reintegrated the Røa players and Knutsen won her 55th and final cap in a 1–0 win over Slovakia in October 2009.

== International goals ==
No.	Date	Venue	Opponent	Score	Result	Competition
1.	20 January 2006	Guangdong Olympic Stadium, Guangzhou, China	China	1–1	1–3	2006 Four Nations Tournament
2.	20 June 2006	Halden stadion, Halden, Norway	Greece	3–0	4–0	2007 FIFA Women's World Cup qualification
3.	23 September 2006	Stadio Romeo Neri, Rimini, Italy	Italy	2–0	2–1	2007 FIFA Women's World Cup qualification

== Personal ==
Knutsen studied psychology and was married in the summer of 2008. In January 2010 she announced she was expecting her first child and would not play football during 2010. She and her husband Patrick Johansen then moved to New York City, USA where they lived with their son Jasper. Knutsen played amateur football for Rovers in the New York Metropolitan Women's Soccer League. Her younger sister, Guro Knutsen continued to play for Røa IL. Both sisters are members of the Christian sports organization Kristen Idrettskontakt (KRIK).

== Honors ==
=== Club ===
- Røa
  - League champion 2007, 2008, 2009
  - Cup champion 2006, 2008, 2009
- Trondheims-Ørn
  - League champion 2003
