= Lene Mykjåland =

Norwegian footballer (born 1987)

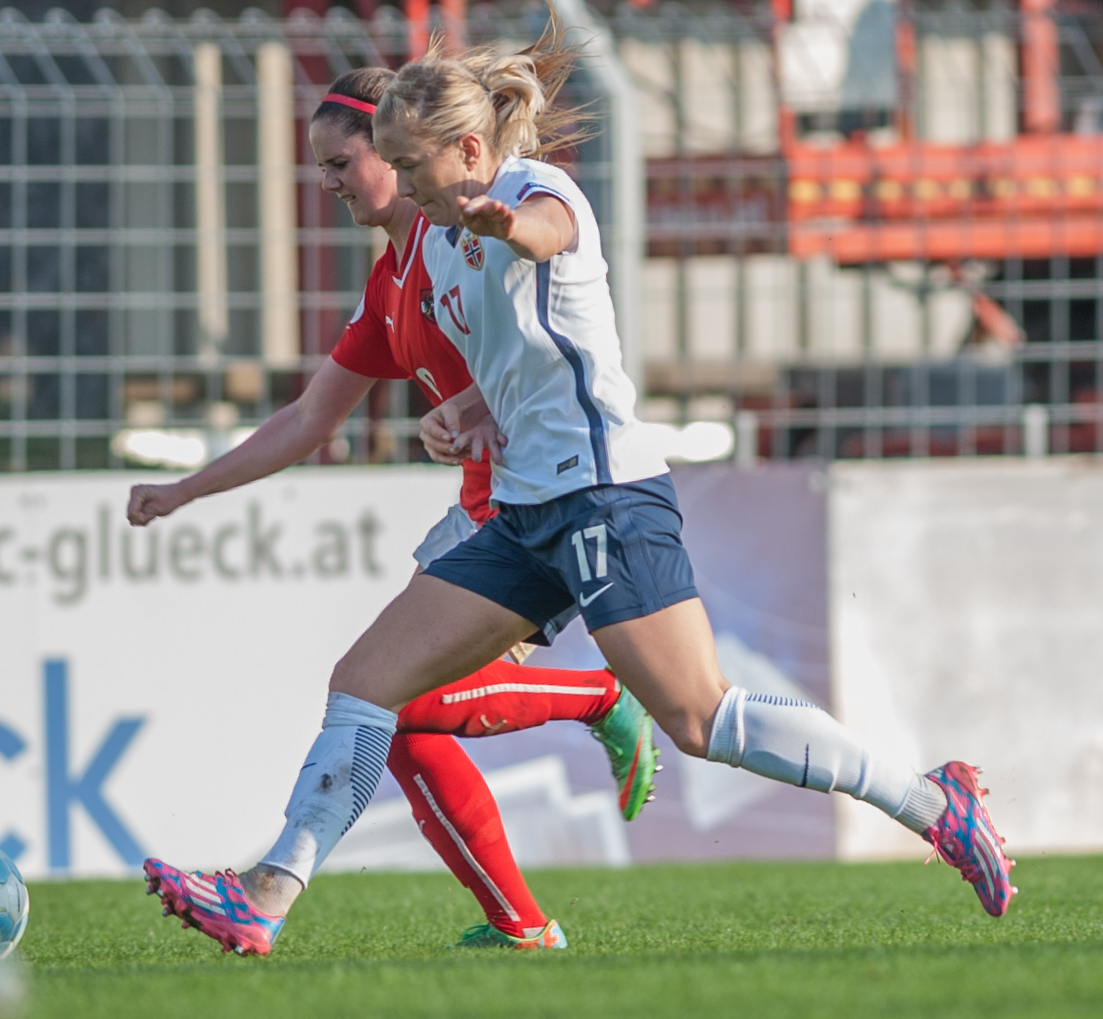

Personal information
- Full name: Lene Mykjåland
- Date of birth: 20 February 1987 (age 39)
- Place of birth: Kristiansand, Norway
- Height: 1.62 m (5 ft 4 in)
- Positions: Striker; midfielder

Youth career
- Randesund IL

Senior career*
Years	Team	Apps	(Gls)
2003–2005	Amazon Grimstad		
2005–2010	Røa	78	(57)
2010	Washington Freedom	19	(4)
2011–2012	Røa	37	(23)
2013–2016	LSK Kvinner	66	(33)

International career^{‡}
2002	Norway U17	6	(4)
2002–2006	Norway U19	22	(5)
2005–2006	Norway U21	7	(1)
2007	Norway U23	2	(1)
2007–2016	Norway	91	(14)
Medal record
Women's football
Representing Norway
UEFA Women's Championship
Silver medal – second place	2013 Sweden	Team
- * Club domestic league appearances and goals as of 4 November 2016 ‡ National team caps and goals as of 23:09, 15 July 2016 (UTC)

Lene Mykjåland (born 20 February 1987) is a Norwegian former footballer who played as a forward and midfielder. Having made her debut for the senior team on 7 March 2007, in a 1–2 loss against Germany.

== Career ==
Mykjåland started her career in Randesund IL, a district club in Kristiansand. In 2003, Mykjåland played with Amazon Grimstad and played there until she went on to Røa in September 2005. Mykjåland was Røa's top scorer in 2007 with 11 goals.

Mykjåland quickly became one of the league's top talents, and has also managed to establish herself on the Norwegian National senior squad, having been called up to both the 2007 Women's World Cup as well as the 2008 Summer Olympics held in Beijing, China.

On 21 October 2008 Mykjåland and four other Røa players – Marie Knutsen, Guro Knutsen, Marit Fiane Christensen and Siri Nordby – made headlines when they announced in a press release that they would not be returning to the national team due to issues the five had with the national team leadership. While the press statement never mentioned coach Bjarne Berntsen's name, it was assumed that he was instrumental in their decision to retire from the team. The retirement, which came off in many newspapers as a boycott, created widespread media attention. When Eli Landsem took over the national team after the 2009 European Championship, they ended their boycott and made themselves available again for the national team. On 15 January 2010, Mykjåland played her first game for Norway since the boycott in a 1–1 draw against England. In 2011, Mykjåland was included in the squad that was going to play in the 2011 Women's World Cup.

The Washington Freedom of Women's Professional Soccer announced on 23 December 2009, that they had signed Mykjåland, and she joined the team on 1 April 2010. After one season in America, she returned to Norway and signed a two-year contract with former team Røa.

== Career statistics ==
Statistics accurate as of match played 30 October 2016

Club	Season	Division	League		Cup		Total	
Club	Season	Division	Apps	Goals	Apps	Goals	Apps	Goals
2010	Washington Freedom	WPS	19	4	0	0	19	4
2011	Røa	Toppserien	22	10	2	0	24	10
2012	Røa	Toppserien	15	13	3	1	18	14
2013	LSK Kvinner	Toppserien	9	4	0	0	9	4
2014	LSK Kvinner	Toppserien	21	11	2	2	23	13
2015	LSK Kvinner	Toppserien	17	11	4	2	21	13
2016	LSK Kvinner	Toppserien	19	7	4	4	23	11
Career Total			122	60	15	9	137	69

== International goals ==
No.	Date	Venue	Opponent	Score	Result	Competition
1.	3 May 2008	Sør Arena, Kristiansand, Norway	Israel	4–0	7–0	UEFA Women's Euro 2009 qualifying
2.	21 June 2008	Ertl Glas, Amstetten, Austria	Austria	1–0	4–0	UEFA Women's Euro 2009 qualifying
3.	21 June 2008	Ertl Glas, Amstetten, Austria	Austria	3–0	4–0	UEFA Women's Euro 2009 qualifying
4.	21 June 2008	Ertl Glas, Amstetten, Austria	Austria	4–0	4–0	UEFA Women's Euro 2009 qualifying
5.	25 June 2008	City Stadium, Kutno, Poland	Poland	2–0	3–0	UEFA Women's Euro 2009 qualifying
6.	27 March 2010	AKA Arena, Hønefoss, Norway	Macedonia	6–0	14–0	2011 FIFA Women's World Cup qualification
7.	27 March 2010	AKA Arena, Hønefoss, Norway	Macedonia	13–0	14–0	2011 FIFA Women's World Cup qualification
8.	30 March 2010	Neman Stadium, Grodno, Belarus	Belarus	4–0	5–0	2011 FIFA Women's World Cup qualification
9.	20 June 2012	Sarpsborg Stadion, Sarpsborg, Norway	Northern Ireland	1–0	2–0	UEFA Women's Euro 2013 qualifying
10.	7 March 2014	Municipal Stadium, Lagos, Portugal	Iceland	1–1	1–2	2014 Algarve Cup
11.	10 March 2014	Estádio Municipal, Albufeira, Portugal	Germany	1–0	1–3	2014 Algarve Cup
12.	29 May 2015	Marienlyst Stadion, Drammen, Norway	Finland	1–0	2–0	Friendly
13.	29 May 2015	Marienlyst Stadion, Drammen, Norway	Finland	2–0	2–0	Friendly
14.	10 April 2016	Vorwärts Stadium, Steyr, Austria	Austria	1–0	1–0	UEFA Women's Euro 2017 qualifying

== Honours ==
=== Club ===
Røa

- Toppserien: 2007, 2008, 2009
- Norwegian Cup: 2006, 2008

LSK Kvinner

- Toppserien: 2014, 2015
- Norwegian Cup: 2014, 2015

=== Individual ===
- Top Scorer, Toppserien: 2009 (20 goals)
