= Elisabeth Wahlin =

Norwegian football player (born 1980)

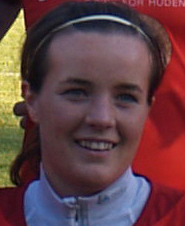

Personal information
- Date of birth: 28 September 1980 (age 46)
- Place of birth: Narvik, Norway
- Height: 1.72 m (5 ft 8 in)

Senior career*
Years	Team	Apps	(Gls)
- Røa IL
- * Club domestic league appearances and goals

Elisabeth Wahlin (born 28 September 1980) is a Norwegian female footballer who has played and coached Fløya.
