= Christine Colombo Nilsen =

Norwegian footballer (born 1982)

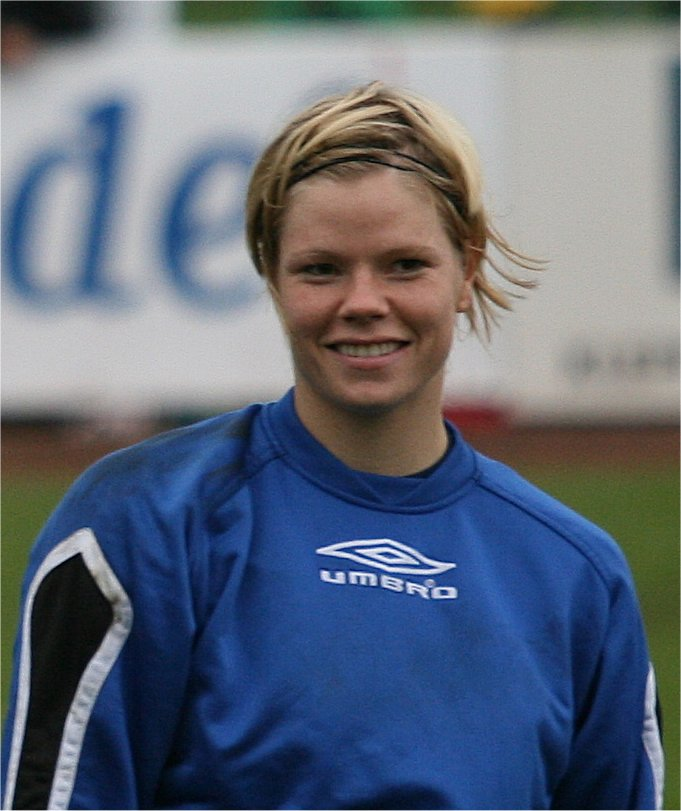

Personal information
- Date of birth: 30 April 1982 (age 44)
- Place of birth: Norway
- Height: 1.83 m (6 ft 0 in)
- Position: Goalkeeper

Senior career*
Years	Team	Apps	(Gls)
- Kambo
–2001	Athene Moss		
2002	Arna-Bjørnar		
2003–2004	Liungen		
2005–2009	Kolbotn	75	
2009–2010	Lyon		(0)
2010–2011	Arna-Bjørnar	4	(0)
2012–2013	Vålerenga	4	(0)

International career^{‡}
1999	Norway u-17	3	(0)
2000–2001	Norway u-18	7	(0)
2002–2006	Norway u-21	12	(0)
2006–2010	Norway	9	(0)
- * Club domestic league appearances and goals as of 29 February 2012 ‡ National team caps and goals as of 29 February 2012

Christine Colombo Nilsen (married Hajo; born 30 April 1982) is a retired Norwegian football goalkeeper. She currently (2012) plays for Vålerenga in the Toppserien. She is also a member of the Norway women's national football team.

She appeared twelve times for the national team following her debut on 11 March 2006 in a match against Finland. She was a member of the 2007 Women's World Cup squad.

On 9 June 2008, Nilsen was named to the Norwegian roster for the 2008 Summer Olympics held in Beijing, China. Where her team beat defending Olympic champions USA and made it to the quarter finals

In 2009, she joined French champions Olympique Lyonnais, where she played in the UEFA Women's Champions League, which OL won in 2010 by beating Turbine Potsdam in the Final.

Nilsen left Olympique Lyonnais in July 2010 and returned to Norway to work as a hairdresser. She was persuaded to stand in goal for Arna-Bjørnar in Autumn 2010 while Erika Skarbø was injured, and was also a member of the Norway national squad that in September qualified for the 2011 World Cup.

In Autumn 2011, she played a further two matches for Arna-Bjørnar. In January 2012, she joined the newly promoted Toppserien club Vålerenga, trained by her former Kolbotn teammates Cecilie Berg-Hansen and Solveig Gulbrandsen. She was a member of Norway's squad at the 2012 Algarve Cup.
