= Equatorial Guinea at the FIFA Women's World Cup =

The Equatorial Guinea women's national football team has represented Equatorial Guinea at the FIFA Women's World Cup on one occasion, in 2011.

== FIFA Women's World Cup record ==
World Cup Finals
Year	Result	GP	W	D*	L	GF	GA	GD
(China) 1991	Did not enter							
(Sweden) 1995	Did not enter							
(United States) 1999	Did not enter							
(United States) 2003	Did not qualify							
(China) 2007	Did not qualify							
(Germany) 2011	Group Stage	3	0	0	3	2	7	−5
(Canada) 2015	Did not qualify							
(France) 2019	Banned							
(Australia) (New Zealand) 2023	Did not qualify							
(Brazil) 2027	To be determined							
(Costa Rica) (Jamaica) (Mexico) (United States) 2031	To be determined							
(United Kingdom) 2035	To be determined							
Total	1/12	3	0	0	3	2	7	−5

*Draws include knockout matches decided on penalty kicks.

FIFA Women's World Cup history
Year	Round	Date	Opponent	Result	Stadium
(Germany) 2011	Group stage	29 June	Norway	L 0–1	Impuls Arena, Augsburg
(Germany) 2011	Group stage	3 July	Australia	L 2–3	Ruhrstadion, Bochum
(Germany) 2011	Group stage	6 July	Brazil	L 0–3	Commerzbank-Arena, Frankfurt

=== Record by opponent ===
FIFA Women's World Cup matches (by team)
Opponent	Pld	W	D	L	GF	GA
Australia	1	0	0	1	2	3
Brazil	1	0	0	1	0	3
Norway	1	0	0	1	0	1

== 2011 FIFA Women's World Cup ==
=== Group D ===
Pos	Team	Pld	W	D	L	GF	GA	GD	Pts	Qualification
1	Brazil	3	3	0	0	7	0	+7	9	Advance to knockout stage
2	Australia	3	2	0	1	5	4	+1	6	Advance to knockout stage
3	Norway	3	1	0	2	2	5	−3	3	
4	Equatorial Guinea	3	0	0	3	2	7	−5	0	

Source: FIFA
Rules for classification: Group stage tiebreakers
29 June 2011
15:00

Norway	1–0	Equatorial Guinea
Haavi 84'	Report

Impuls Arena, Augsburg
Attendance: 12,928
Referee: Quetzalli Alvarado (Mexico)
3 July 2011
14:00

Australia	3–2	Equatorial Guinea
Khamis 8'; Van Egmond 48'; De Vanna 51'	Report	Añonma 21', 83'

Ruhrstadion, Bochum
Attendance: 15,640
Referee: Gyöngyi Gaál (Hungary)
6 July 2011
18:00

Equatorial Guinea	0–3	Brazil
	Report	Érika 49'; Cristiane 54', 90+3' (pen.)

Commerzbank-Arena, Frankfurt
Attendance: 35,859
Referee: Bibiana Steinhaus (Germany)

== Goalscorers ==
Player	Goals	2011
Genoveva Añonma	2	2
Total	2	2
