= Anya De Courcy =

Trinidadian footballer (born 1997)

Personal information
- Full name: Ochelle Anya De Courcy
- Date of birth: 4 August 1997 (age 29)
- Place of birth: Trinidad, Trinidad and Tobago
- Position: Forward

Team information
- Current team: Røa
- Number: 30

Youth career
- 2013–2014: Sunndal
- 2015–2016: Trondheims-Ørn

Senior career*
Years	Team	Apps	(Gls)
2013–2014	Sunndal	27	(14)
2013–2014	Sunndal (seven-a-side)	8	(4)
2015–2017	Trondheims-Ørn 2	28	(32)
2015–2016	Trondheims-Ørn (futsal)	8	(0)
2017	Trondheims-Ørn	7	(1)
2018–2019	Byåsen	22	(7)
2019	Byåsen 2	2	(5)
2019–	Røa	17	(1)
2019–	Røa 2	9	(1)

International career^{‡}
2014	Norway U17	1	(0)
2021–	Trinidad and Tobago	1	(0)
- * Club domestic league appearances and goals as of 10 October 2021. ‡ National team caps and goals as of 21 October 2021.

Ochelle Anya De Courcy (born 5 August 1997), known as Anya De Courcy, is a Trinidadian footballer who plays as a forward for Norwegian First Division club Røa IL and the Trinidad and Tobago women's national team.

== Early life ==
De Courcy was born in Trinidad to a Norwegian father and a Trinidadian mother. When she was around five years old, she and her family moved to Antigua, Antigua and Barbuda, remaining there until she was 15, when her family ultimately settled in Norway. She holds both Trinidad and Tobago and Norwegian citizenships. She does not have the Antigua and Barbuda one, despite calling herself as Antiguan.

== Club career ==
In 2013, shortly after moving to Norway, De Courcy joined Sunndal Fotball, where she would spend two seasons. After that, she moved to SK Trondheims-Ørn, making her Toppserien debut in 2017. Next year, she was transferred to Byåsen Toppfotball, playing there until mid-2019 season, when she joined Røa.

== International career ==
De Courcy played once for the Norway women's national under-17 football team in 2014. She made her senior debut for Trinidad and Tobago on 21 October 2021.
