= Gabrielle Ngaska =

Cameroonian footballer

Personal information
- Full name: Gabrielle Leonie Ngaska
- Date of birth: 14 April 1988 (age 38)
- Place of birth: Ntouessong, Cameroon
- Height: 1.65 m (5 ft 5 in)
- Position: Forward

Team information
- Current team: La Solana

Senior career*
Years	Team	Apps	(Gls)
2012	Lorema FC Yaoundé		
2013	SC 07 Bad Neuenahr II	11	(4)
2013	SC 07 Bad Neuenahr	0	(0)
2015–2016	ŽFK Spartak Subotica		
2016–2017	ADYC Pinto		
2017–2018	Fundación Albacete	17	(0)
2018–	La Solana		(2021-2023)
- Cacereño femenino

International career^{‡}
	Cameroon	1+	(0+)
- * Club domestic league appearances and goals ‡ National team caps and goals as of 29 October 2012

Gabrielle Leonie Ngaska (born 14 April 1988) is a Cameroonian footballer who plays as a forward for Spanish Primera Nacional club FF La Solana. She played for the Cameroon women's national team at the 2012 African Women's Championship.
