= Hedda Strand Gardsjord =

Norwegian footballer (born 1982)

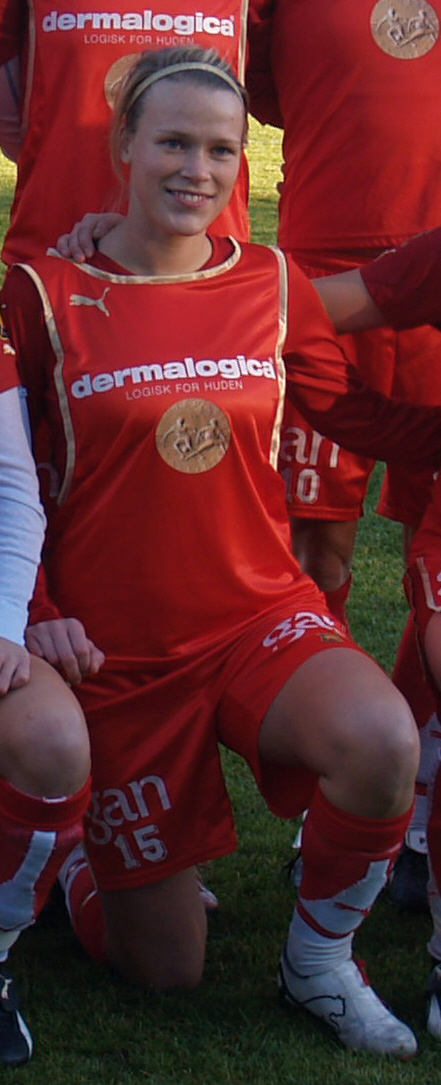
- With Røa in 2007

Personal information
- Full name: Hedda Strand Gardsjord
- Date of birth: 28 June 1982 (age 44)
- Place of birth: Oslo, Norway
- Height: 1.68 m (5 ft 6 in)
- Position: Right-back

Youth career
- Bærums Verk
- IL Jutul
- 2002–2005: VCU Rams

Senior career*
Years	Team	Apps	(Gls)
2000–2001	Røa IL		
2006-2016	Røa IL	149	(1)

International career^{‡}
2009–2015	Norway	32	(0)
- * Club domestic league appearances and goals as of 12:38, 7 March 2015 (UTC) ‡ National team caps and goals as of 12:38, 7 March 2015 (UTC)

Hedda Strand Gardsjord (born 28 June 1982) is a Norwegian footballer who plays as a right-back.

In January 2009, Gardsjord debuted for the Norway women's national football team in a 5–1 defeat by rivals Sweden in Marbella. She was 26 years old and had never played for Norway's youth teams. Her national team chance came about when five club mates quit international football, following a furious bust-up with coach Bjarne Berntsen.

She was picked for Norway's UEFA Women's Euro 2009 squad and continued to be selected by Berntsen's replacement Eli Landsem. This included a place at the 2011 FIFA Women's World Cup, where Gardsjord played twice as Norway crashed out in the first round. She took an indefinite break from the national team in early 2012, after struggling to balance the demands of travel and training with her other career as a landscape architect.
