= Caroline Knutsen =

Norwegian footballer (born 1983)

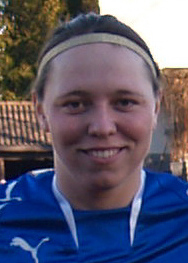
- Knutsen in 2007

Personal information
- Date of birth: 21 November 1983 (age 42)
- Place of birth: Tromsø
- Position: Goalkeeper

Youth career
- Kongsvinger

Senior career*
Years	Team	Apps	(Gls)
1999–2006	Asker		
2002	→ Vålerenga (loan)		
2007–2012	Røa IL		
2013	Vålerenga		

International career^{‡}
	Norway	4	(0)

Managerial career
- 2016–: Bærum
- * Club domestic league appearances and goals ‡ National team caps and goals as of 26 June 2011 (before the 2011 FIFA Women's World Cup)

Caroline Knutsen (born 21 November 1983) is a retired Norwegian footballer who played as a goalkeeper for the Norway women's national football team. She was part of the team at the UEFA Women's Euro 2009 and the 2011 FIFA Women's World Cup. On club level she played for Asker, Vålerenga and Røa in Norway.

In 2016 she became the new head coach of Bærum SK. She lived in Skibotn and Tromsø in her earliest years, but grew up in Kongsvinger and attended the Norwegian School of Elite Sport.
