= Alejandra Velasco =

Colombian footballer (born 1985)

Personal information
- Full name: Briddy Alejandra Velasco Martín
- Date of birth: 23 August 1985 (age 41)
- Height: 1.70 m (5 ft 7 in)
- Position: Goalkeeper

Senior career*
Years	Team	Apps	(Gls)
- Club Deportivo Gol Star
2012	Boston Breakers	2	(0)

International career^{‡}
	Colombia	0	(0)
- * Club domestic league appearances and goals ‡ National team caps and goals as of 26 June 2011 (before the 2011 FIFA Women's World Cup)

Briddy Alejandra Velasco Martín (born 23 August 1985) is a Colombian footballer who played as a goalkeeper for the Colombia women's national football team. She was part of the team at the 2011 FIFA Women's World Cup. At the club level, she played for Club Deportivo Gol Star in Colombia and the Boston Breakers in the Women's Premier Soccer League Elite.
