= Maria Rosa Ribas Monné =

Catalan composer and pianist

Maria Rosa Ribas Monné (25 July 1944 in Barcelona, 20 February 2024) is a Catalan composer and pianist. She teaches at the Catalonia College of Music and at the Music School Victòria dels Àngels of Sant Cugat del Vallès in Catalonia. She studied music at the Conservatory of Barcelona, where she obtained the titles of piano, guitar, solfeo and composition. She was awarded an Honourable Mention for Fugue and the honour prizes of Piano, Chamber Music, Harmony and Composition.

She was a disciple of the masters Sofia Puche, Josep Poch, Xavier Montsalvatge and Antoni Ros Marbà, among others. From Carles Guinovart she received knowledge of contemporary music, and with Paul Schilhawsky she specifically worked on the accompaniment of the lied. She also has expanded her training with numerous courses and seminars by renowned musicians such as Rosalyn Tureck, Dimitri Baskiroff, Frederic Gevers, Paul Badura Skoda or Witold Lutoslawsky.

In 1980, she won the composition award Francesc Basil de Figueres, and in 1998 the 1st prize in the Caterina Albert composition award, in the name of L'Associació Catalana de la Dona, and in 2009 she won the 1st prize in the Concurs de Dones Compositores de Sant Cugat with the piece 12 haikús japonesos for voice and piano, and with poems by Matsuo Bashö translated by Jordi Coca.
