= Yineth Varón =

Colombian footballer (born 1982)

Personal information
- Full name: Yineth Varón Parra
- Date of birth: 23 June 1982 (age 44)
- Place of birth: Colombia
- Height: 1.69 m (5 ft 7 in)
- Position: Goalkeeper

Senior career*
Years	Team	Apps	(Gls)
- Generaciones Palmiranas

International career
- Colombia
- * Club domestic league appearances and goals

Yineth Varón Parra is a Colombian football goalkeeper who plays for CD Generaciones Palmiranas.

== Career ==
Varón was called up for the 2011 World Cup on June 15 after Paula Forero was injured in a training season. On June 28, marking the start of the tournament, she was suspended provisionally by FIFA as she failed an anti-doping test, leaving the Colombia national team one goalkeeper short. The following day the Colombian Football Federation explained Varón was subjected to a hormonal treatment months earlier without informing the federation. FIFA opened disciplinary proceedings after the B sample confirmed the result, and on August 25 a two-year suspension was decreed.

Varón later explained that suffering from chronic fatigue and low hemoglobin she decided to take three 12.5 mg microdoses of nandrolone decanoate between February 25 and March 29 under doctor Raúl Henao as she thought she wouldn't compete in the following months. Dr. Henao was surprised that such treatment could cause the test failure.
