= Kim Chol-ok =

North Korean footballer (born 1994)

Personal information
- Date of birth: 15 October 1994 (age 32)
- Position: Goalkeeper

Senior career*
Years	Team	Apps	(Gls)
- 25 April

International career^{‡}
	North Korea	1	(0)
- * Club domestic league appearances and goals ‡ National team caps and goals as of 26 June 2011 (before the 2011 FIFA Women's World Cup)

Kim Chol-ok (김철옥; born 15 October 1994) is a North Korean footballer who plays as a goalkeeper for the North Korea women's national football team. She was part of the team at the 2011 FIFA Women's World Cup. At the club level, she plays for 25 April in North Korea.
