= María Jesús Rosa =

María Jesús Rosa may refer to:

- María Jesús Rosa (boxer) (1974-2018), Spanish boxer
- María Jesús Rosa (field hockey) (born 1979), Spanish field hockey player
