= Roseane (footballer) =

Brazilian footballer

Personal information
- Full name: Roseane Aparecida de Oliveira Souza
- Date of birth: 23 July 1985 (age 41)
- Position: Defender

Senior career*
Years	Team	Apps	(Gls)
2011-2012	Bangu		
2014	FC Zorky Krasnogorsk (women)	5	(0)
2015-2017	Centro Olímpico		
2017-2018	F.C. Kiryat Gat		

International career^{‡}
	Brazil	12	(0)
- * Club domestic league appearances and goals ‡ National team caps and goals as of 26 June 2011 (before the 2011 FIFA Women's World Cup)

Roseane Aparecida de Oliveira Souza (born 23 July 1985), known as just Roseane, also Zizi, is a Brazilian footballer who plays as a defender for the Brazil women's national football team. She was part of the team at the 2011 FIFA Women's World Cup. On club level she played for various clubs in Brasil, including Bangu, also for Zorkiy in Russia and Makkabi Kiryat-Gat in Israel.
