= María Rosa Ondo =

Equatoguinean footballer (born 1982)

María Rosa
Personal information
- Full name: María Rosa Ondo Nsing
- Date of birth: 10 October 1982 (age 44)
- Height: 1.63 m (5 ft 4 in)
- Position: Goalkeeper

Youth career
- INES Rey Malabo

Senior career*
Years	Team	Apps	(Gls)
- EWaiso Ipola
- Águilas Verdes de Aneja
- Inter Continental
- Real Dona
- Estrellas de Guadalupe

International career^{‡}
- Equatorial Guinea U20
	Equatorial Guinea	7	(0)

Managerial career
- Sony de Elá Nguema Women (goalkeeper coach)
- Malabo Kings Women (goalkeeper coach)
- Equatorial Guinea Women (goalkeeper coach)
- * Club domestic league appearances and goals ‡ National team caps and goals as of 26 June 2011 (prior the 2011 FIFA Women's World Cup)

María Rosa Ondo Nsing (born 10 October 1982), known as María Rosa, is an Equatorial Guinean football manager and former player who played as a goalkeeper. She has been a member of the Equatorial Guinea women's national team, first as a player and later as a coach. She currently chairs the Women's Football Association in her country.

== Early life ==
María Rosa started playing football for INES Rey Malabo in the FENADUE school league.

== Club career ==
María Rosa has made her senior debut for EWaiso Ipola in 2004. She has also played for Águilas Verdes de Aneja, Inter Continental, Real Dona and Estrellas de Guadalupe.

== International career ==
María Rosa has represented Equatorial Guinea at under–20 and senior levels. She was part of the team at the 2011 FIFA Women's World Cup, but was not used.

== Managerial career ==
After retiring from playing, María Rosa has continued to be linked to women's football in Equatorial Guinea. She has been a goalkeeper coach for Sony de Elá Nguema, Malabo Kings and the Equatorial Guinea women's national team.

On 19 September 2020, María Rosa was elected as President of the Women's Football Association in Equatorial Guinea, becoming the first woman to hold that position.

== Personal life ==
María Rosa has a diploma in Marketing and Commercial Action. She is an official in the Ministry of Commerce and Promotion of SMEs where she holds the responsibility of focal point.
