= Cecilie Pedersen (Norwegian footballer) =

Norwegian footballer (born 1990)

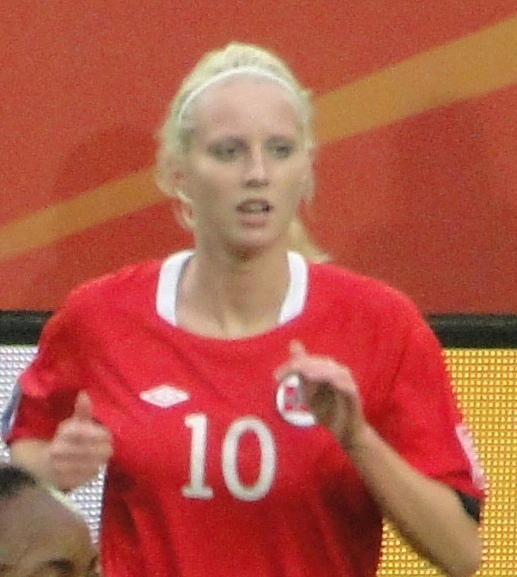
- Pedersen in 2011

Personal information
- Date of birth: 14 September 1990 (age 36)
- Place of birth: Bergen, Norway
- Height: 1.73 m (5 ft 8 in)
- Position: Striker

Youth career
- Sveio

Senior career*
Years	Team	Apps	(Gls)
–2009	SK Haugar		
2009–2011	Avaldsnes		
2012	LSK Kvinner	21	(20)
2013–2019	Avaldsnes	100	(66)

International career
2009–2013	Norway	37	(13)
- * Club domestic league appearances and goals

Cecilie Pedersen (born 14 September 1990) is a Norwegian former footballer who played as a striker. She scored a notable goal against Iceland. She was also known for her high salary.

== Club career ==
Pedersen hails from Førde in Sveio Municipality. She played for SK Haugar until she moved to Avaldsnes IL ahead of the 2009 season on a three-year contract that reportedly made her one of the highest paid women footballers in the country. On 6 November 2009, she won the Gullballen, the prestigious Norwegian football prize.

In 2010, she continued to play for Avaldsnes in the 2nd division while also playing in the national team, but later in the season she was in dispute with the club. National team trainer Eli Landsem advised her strongly to transfer to a Toppserien club, and she entered discussions with Arna-Bjørnar in Bergen at the end of 2010. Avaldsnes made financial demands in compensation for her high salary and the hire of her club car, and local businessmen stepped in with offers. However, on 19 February 2011 it was reported that the parties had failed to reach agreement because her salary requests were excessive relative to the pay of the other players.

In January 2012 Pedersen signed with LSK Kvinner FK.

== International career ==
In June 2009 she was called up to the national team for the European Championships, and in the second game, against Iceland, she was the matchwinner with her goal before the break. She scored Norway's third goal in the quarter final against Sweden which Norway won 3–1.

== Career statistics ==
As of 14 June 2019

Club	Season	Division	League		Cup^{1}		Continental^{2}		Total	
Club	Season	Division	Apps	Goals	Apps	Goals	Apps	Goals	Apps	Goals
LSK Kvinner	2012	Toppserien	21	20	2	0	-		23	20
LSK Kvinner	Total		21	20	2	0	-	-	21	20
Avaldsnes	2013	Toppserien	19	11	5	5	-		24	13
Avaldsnes	2014	Toppserien	22	16	4	2	-		26	19
Avaldsnes	2015	Toppserien	21	18	5	3	-		29	21
Avaldsnes	2016	Toppserien	15	10	1	1	4	4	20	15
Avaldsnes	2017	Toppserien	20	11	4	1	4	2	28	14
Avaldsnes	2018	Toppserien	1	0	0	0	2	1	3	1
Avaldsnes	2019	Toppserien	2	0	1	0	-		3	0
Avaldsnes	Total		100	66	20	12	10	7	130	85
Career total			121	86	22	12	10	7	153	105
