= Blessing Diala =

Nigerian footballer

Personal information
- Full name: Blessing Nnabugwu Diala
- Date of birth: 8 December 1989 (age 36)
- Place of birth: Nigeria
- Height: 1.67 m (5 ft 6 in)
- Position: Forward

Team information
- Current team: Deportivo Evinayong

Senior career*
Years	Team	Apps	(Gls)
2006	Águilas Verdes		
2010	Sunshine Queens		
2013	Bobruichanka Bobruisk	7	(2)
2016	Super Leonas FC		
2017	Deportivo Evinayong		

International career^{‡}
2006–2011	Equatorial Guinea	17	(4)
- * Club domestic league appearances and goals ‡ National team caps and goals as of 26 June 2011 (before the 2011 FIFA Women's World Cup)

Blessing Nnabugwu Diala (born 8 December 1989) is a footballer who plays as a forward.

== Biography ==
Born in Nigeria, Diala is a member, as a naturalized citizen, of the Equatorial Guinea women's national team. She was part of the team at the 2011 FIFA Women's World Cup.

== Club careers ==
Diala played for Bobruichanka in 2013, a women's Belarus club premia league. Diala played for several clubs in Equatorial Guinea, Nigeria, and Belarus during her professional football career. She began her career with Águilas Verdes before joining Sunshine Queens in Nigeria.

== International career ==
Diala represented Equatorial Guinea between 2006 and 2018. She was part of the national squad that won the 2008 African Women's Championship.

She also participated in the 2010 African Women's Championship and represented Equatorial Guinea at the 2011 FIFA Women's World Cup in Germany.

During the 2011 FIFA Women's World Cup, she appeared in all three group-stage matches played by Equatorial Guinea.

== Honors and awards ==
Equatorial Guinea

- Africa Women Cup of Nations: 2008
