= Glory Iroka =

Nigerian footballer

Personal information
- Full name: Glory Iroka
- Date of birth: 3 January 1990 (age 36)
- Place of birth: Nigeria
- Height: 1.63 m (5 ft 4 in)
- Position: Midfielder

Team information
- Current team: Rivers Angels
- Number: 11

Senior career*
Years	Team	Apps	(Gls)
- Rivers Angels

International career^{‡}
2008–2010	Nigeria U-20	4	(1)
2010–	Nigeria	4	(1)
- * Club domestic league appearances and goals ‡ National team caps and goals as of 12:36, 12 July 2015 (UTC)

Glory Iroka (born 3 January 1990) is a Nigerian international footballer who plays as a midfielder for Nigerian Women's Championship club Rivers Angels and the Nigeria women's national football team.

== International career ==
She was part of the Nigerian team in the African Women's Championship of 2012 and 2014, winning the latter.

== Honours ==
=== International ===
Nigeria

- African Women's Championship (2): 2014
