= Gry Tofte Ims =

Norwegian footballer (born 1986)

Personal information
- Full name: Gry Tofte Ims
- Date of birth: 2 March 1986 (age 40)
- Place of birth: Stavanger, Norway
- Height: 1.68 m (5 ft 6 in)
- Position: Midfielder

Youth career
- Austrått IL

Senior career*
Years	Team	Apps	(Gls)
2003–2019	Klepp	322	(86)

International career^{‡}
2010–2016	Norway	48	(4)
Medal record
Women's football
Representing Norway
UEFA Women's Championship
Silver medal – second place	2013 Sweden	Team
- * Club domestic league appearances and goals as of 22 February 2020 ‡ National team caps and goals as of 21:31, 23 June 2015 (UTC)

Gry Tofte Ims (born 2 March 1986) is a former Norwegian footballer. She has played for Klepp IL since 2003 and was named captain of the team at the end of 2008 after the retirement of Ane Stangeland Horpestad. By 2012 she was placed fourth in the club's all-time appearance list.

Ims made her senior national team debut in January 2010, in a 1–0 friendly defeat by China at La Manga Stadium. She was called up to be part of the national team for the 2011 FIFA Women's World Cup and UEFA Women's Euro 2013.
