= Laetitia Chapeh =

Cameroonian footballer (born 1987)

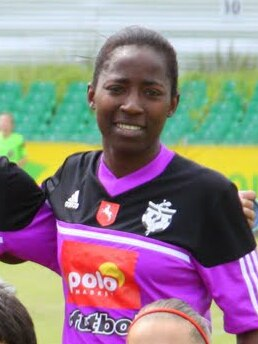
- Chapeh with Medyk Konin in 2013

Personal information
- Full name: Laetitia Chapeh Yimga
- Birth name: Laetitia Yimga Chapeh
- Date of birth: 7 April 1987 (age 39)
- Place of birth: Douala, Cameroon
- Height: 1.71 m (5 ft 7 in)
- Positions: Defender; midfielder

Team information
- Current team: Mouscron

Senior career*
Years	Team	Apps	(Gls)
- Black Queens Mfandena
2009–2011	Lorema FC Yaoundé		
2011	E'Waiso Ipola		
2011–2012	1. FC Katowice	15	(1)
2012–2014	Medyk Konin		
2014–2016	Gintra Universitetas	3	(0)
2017–2020	Lille	29	(0)
2020–2023	Douai		
2023–2024	Hénin-Beaumont		
2024–	Mouscron		

International career
2011–	Equatorial Guinea	9	(0)
- * Club domestic league appearances and goals as of 23 February 2020

Laetitia Chapeh Yimga (born 7 April 1987) is a footballer who plays as a defender for Belgian club Mouscron.

Born and raised in Cameroon to Cameroonian parents, Chapeh has played in the Equatguinean women's league and subsequently capped for the Equatorial Guinea women's national team, appearing at the 2011 FIFA Women's World Cup.

== Club career ==
Chapeh has played in Cameroon for Black Queens de Mfandema during one season and for Lorema FC de Yaoundé from 2009 to early 2011.

== Honours ==
Medyk Konin

- Ekstraliga: 2013–14
- Polish Cup: 2012–13, 2013–14
