= Bruna (footballer, born 1984) =

Brazilian footballer (born 1984)

Personal information
- Full name: Bruna Amarante da Silva
- Date of birth: 12 May 1984 (age 42)
- Place of birth: Petrópolis, Rio de Janeiro, Brazil
- Height: 1.71 m (5 ft 7 in)
- Position: Centre back

Team information
- Current team: São José
- Number: 4

Senior career*
Years	Team	Apps	(Gls)
2007	Mato Grosso do Sul/Saad		
2008	Saad		
2010	Volta Redonda		
2011	Palmeiras		
2011–2012	Rio Preto		
2012–2013	BIIK Kazygurt		
2014	Francana		
2014	Vasco da Gama	3	(0)
2016	CRESSPOM		
2016–2019	Foz Cataratas	41	(1)
2019	CRESSPOM		
2020–2021	São José	29	(0)
2021–2022	CRESSPOM	13	(0)
2022	Recanto da Criança	0	(0)
2023–	São José	5	(1)

International career
2010–2015	Equatorial Guinea		
- * Club domestic league appearances and goals as of 28 May 2023

Bruna Amarante da Silva (born 12 May 1984), known mononymously as Bruna, is a Brazilian professional footballer who plays as a centre back for Série A2 club São José EC.

Bruna played previously in the Kazakhstani women's football championship for BIIK Kazygurt, with which she made her Champions League debut in August 2012. She had played before in her home country.

Bruna was part of the Equatorial Guinea women's national football team at the 2011 FIFA Women's World Cup.

On 5 October 2017, Bruna and other nine Brazilian footballers were declared by FIFA as ineligible to play for Equatorial Guinea.
