= Mirian (footballer) =

Brazilian footballer (born 1982)

Personal information
- Full name: Mirian Silva da Paixão
- Date of birth: 25 February 1982 (age 44)
- Place of birth: Riacho de Santana, Bahia, Brazil
- Height: 1.67 m (5 ft 6 in)
- Position: Goalkeeper

Senior career*
Years	Team	Apps	(Gls)
2003–2007	Associação Atlética São Francisco		
2007	Ferroviária		
2008–2018	Associação Atlética São Francisco	40+	(0)
2019	Osasco Audax	1	(0)
2020–2021	Fortaleza	10	(0)
2022	Menina Olímpica	1	(0)
2022	JC Futebol Clube	0	(0)
2023	Ceará	2	(0)

International career^{‡}
2008–2016	Equatorial Guinea	9	(0)
- * Club domestic league appearances and goals as of 18 March 2023 ‡ National team caps and goals as of 26 June 2011 (before the 2011 FIFA Women's World Cup)

Mirian Silva da Paixão (born 25 February 1982), simply known as Mirian, is a Brazilian former professional footballer who played as a goalkeeper.

== Career ==
Mirian was part of the Equatorial Guinea women's national football team at the 2011 FIFA Women's World Cup. She started all the three matches Equatorial Guinea played in the competition. The "Nzalang Nacional" ended losing all the matches they played in the group stage and didn't qualify for the World Cup's knockout stage. This was the only time, to date, the team played the competition. The squad was filled with Brazilian-born players (9 in total) and a FIFA posterior investigation found the "Equatorial Guinea Football Association liable for the use of forged or falsified documents", banning them from competing at the 2019 FIFA Women's World Cup and the 2020 Summer Olympics. Moreover, on October 5, 2017, FIFA declared Mirian and other nine Brazilian footballers ineligible to play for Equatorial Guinea.
