= Guro Knutsen Mienna =

Norwegian footballer (born 1985)

Guro Knutsen
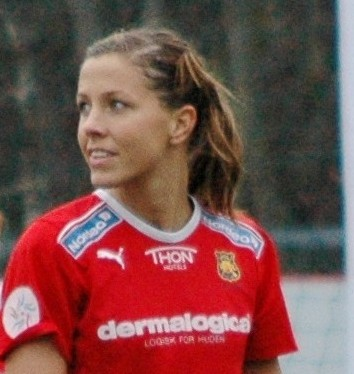

Personal information
- Full name: Guro Knutsen
- Date of birth: 10 January 1985 (age 41)
- Place of birth: Trondheim, Norway
- Height: 1.67 m (5 ft 5 1/2 in)
- Position: Midfielder

Senior career*
Years	Team	Apps	(Gls)
2001–2005	Kattem		
2006–2013	Røa IL		

International career^{‡}
2006–2012	Norway	36	(3)
- * Club domestic league appearances and goals as of 14:16, 6 October 2014 (UTC) ‡ National team caps and goals as of 14:16, 6 October 2014 (UTC)

Guro Knutsen (born Guro Knutsen on 10 January 1985) is a Norwegian former footballer who played for Røa IL of the Toppserien league and for the Norway women's national football team.

== Biography ==
Knutsen played alongside her older sister Marie Knutsen in the Norwegian team that finished fourth at the 2007 FIFA Women's World Cup in China.

Knutsen won the Norwegian league with Røa IL in 2007 and 2008, and also in 2008 won the Royal Cup to complete "the double". She helped her club to the double again in 2009, and they won the Cup in 2010 and then the League in 2011.

Knutsen competed with Norway in the 2008 Summer Olympics in China and scored the opening goal in the group match against Japan. Norway was defeated by Brazil in the quarter-finals.

In October 2008 Knutsen was one of five Røa players who announced their refusal to play for the national team under the management of Bjarne Berntsen. She was recalled by Berntsen's successor Eli Landsem and was selected for the 2011 FIFA Women's World Cup in Germany. Knutsen won a total of 36 senior caps and scored three goals for Norway.

She is a member of the Christian sports organization Kristen Idrettskontakt (KRIK) and is a medical student at the University of Oslo.

Knutsen missed Røa's entire 2013 season due to pregnancy and announced her retirement from football in January 2014.
