= Carol Carioca =

Brazilian footballer (born 1983)

Personal information
- Full name: Carolina Conceição Martins Pereira
- Date of birth: 18 February 1983 (age 43)
- Place of birth: Rio de Janeiro, Brazil
- Height: 1.71 m (5 ft 7 in)
- Position: Centre back

Senior career*
Years	Team	Apps	(Gls)
2001–2002	Vasco		
2002	América de Rio Preto		
2003–2004	Santos		
2005–2008	Botucatu		
2008–2009	Jena		
2010–2011	Botucatu		
2011	CRESSPOM		
2012	Chungbuk Sportstoto		
2013	Duque de Caxias		
2014	Portuguesa		
2014	Foz Cataratas	4	(0)
2014	Vitória das Tabocas		
2015	São Paulo FC		
2015	Centro Olímpico	3	(0)
2016	União	0	(0)
2017	Kindermann	2	(0)
2017	CRESSPOM	7	(1)
2018	Foz Cataratas	10	(0)
2018–2019	Hapoel Be'er Sheva	21	(3)
2019	Fluminense		
2020	Foz Cataratas	7	(3)
2021	Botafogo	5	(1)
2021	Malabo Kings		

International career^{‡}
2008–2016	Equatorial Guinea	8	(3)
- * Club domestic league appearances and goals as of 28 November 2020 ‡ National team caps and goals as of 26 June 2011 (before the 2011 FIFA Women's World Cup)

Carolina Conceição Martins Pereira (born 18 February 1983), known as Carol Carioca, is a Brazilian former footballer who played as a centre back. She was part of the Equatorial Guinea women's national football team at the 2011 FIFA Women's World Cup. On 5 October 2017, she and other nine Brazilian footballers were declared by FIFA as ineligible to play for Equatorial Guinea.

== Football career ==
Carol Carioca first became involved in footballer through her father, who she both attended games with and watched televised matches. She would also play street football with teams of boys, although her mother disapproved. Pereira is Brazilian by birth, but had been invited to Equatorial Guinea to play football in 2007. After staying in the country, she was recruited for the women's national football team. She caught malaria the following year, which she said was one of the low lights of her career along with the results of a career threatening ankle surgery in 2009 which she was told might mean she could no longer play football. As a footballer, she plays under the name "Carol Carioca".

In April 2010, Carol Carioca was one of several high-profile players who helped draw the group states of the FIFA U-20 Women's World Cup held later that year in Germany. Pereira was included in the Equatorial Guinea squad for the 2011 FIFA Women's World Cup, held in Germany. This was the first time the nation had qualified to appear at the Women's World Cup, and Pereira said that doing so was her proudest moment as a footballer so far. The first round match between Equatorial Guinea and Brazil was the first time a Brazilian player naturalized for another nation had played against them in women's football.

When Carol Carioca was a member of the Equatorial Guinea team that won the 2012 African Women's Championship, she was one of 11 out of the 21 players who were naturalized Brazilians playing as Equatoguineans.

Carol Carioca retired from playing on 18 November 2021 after reaching with Malabo Kings FC the fourth place of the CAF Women's Champions League inaugural edition. Following the loss to ASFAR for the third-place match, she expressed to media she would continue to be linked to women's football.
