= Tiga (footballer) =

Brazilian football and futsal player (born 1983)

Personal information
- Full name: Adriana Aparecida Costa
- Date of birth: 16 April 1983 (age 43)
- Place of birth: São Paulo, São Paulo, Brazil
- Height: 1.67 m (5 ft 6 in)
- Positions: Forward; pivot (futsal)

Senior career*
Years	Team	Apps	(Gls)
2000	Palmeiras		
2001	Portuguesa		
2004	A Sabesp (futsal)		
2005	Serc Chimarrão (futsal)		
2006	Nacional Gás/Unifor (futsal)		
2009	Corinthians		
2012	XV de Piracicaba		
2012	Portuguesa		
2013	São Caetano		
2015	São Paulo		
2016	São Caetano (futsal)		
2017	ICP Atibaia (futsal)		
2017	Audax	11	(0)
2018	Leoas da Serra (futsal)		

International career^{‡}
2011–2016	Equatorial Guinea	6	(8)
- * Club domestic league appearances and goals ‡ National team caps and goals as of 26 June 2011 (before the 2011 FIFA Women's World Cup)

Adriana Aparecida Costa (born 16 April 1983), known as Tiga and Tiganinha, is a Brazilian retired footballer who played as a forward. She is also a former futsal player who operated as a pivot.

== Club career ==
Tiga has exclusively played for Brazilian clubs in both football and futsal.

In futsal, Tiga played for UNIP.

== Controversy ==
From 2011 to 2016, Tiga made appearances for Equatorial Guinea despite having no connection with the African nation. She was first recruited to play at the 2011 FIFA Women's World Cup. She was later a member of the squad that won the 2012 Women's African Football Championship. On 5 October 2017, she and other nine Brazilian footballers were declared by FIFA as ineligible to play for Equatorial Guinea.

=== International goals ===
Scores and results list Equatorial Guinea's goal tally first

No.	Date	Venue	Opponent	Score	Result	Competition
1	17 June 2011	Stade Jos Becker, Niederanven, Luxembourg	Luxembourg	1–0	8–0	Friendly
2	17 June 2011	Stade Jos Becker, Niederanven, Luxembourg	Luxembourg	2–0	8–0	Friendly
3	17 June 2011	Stade Jos Becker, Niederanven, Luxembourg	Luxembourg	3–0	8–0	Friendly
4	23 June 2012	Estadio de Malabo, Malabo, Equatorial Guinea	DR Congo	1–0	3–0	Friendly
5	25 June 2012	Estadio de Malabo, Malabo, Equatorial Guinea	DR Congo	1–0	2–1	Friendly
6	3 November 2012	Estadio de Malabo, Malabo, Equatorial Guinea	Senegal	3–0	5–0	2012 African Women's Championship
7	11 November 2012	Estadio de Malabo, Malabo, Equatorial Guinea	South Africa	2–0	4–0	2012 African Women's Championship
8	10 April 2016	Estadio de Malabo, Malabo, Equatorial Guinea	Mali	2–1	2–1	2016 Africa Women Cup of Nations qualification
