= Cris (footballer, born 1985) =

Brazilian footballer (born 1985)

Personal information
- Full name: Ana Cristina da Silva
- Date of birth: 12 December 1985 (age 40)
- Place of birth: Três Rios, Brazil
- Height: 1.63 m (5 ft 4 in)
- Positions: Defensive midfielder; centre back

Team information
- Current team: Atlético Piauiense

Senior career*
Years	Team	Apps	(Gls)
- Olaria
- Santos
2007–2008	America Rio		
2010–2011	Palmeiras		
2012	XV de Piracicaba		
2013	São Caetano		
2014	Ferroviária	4	(0)
2015	São Paulo		
2016–2018	Iranduba	14	(1)
2019–2020	São Paulo	15	(2)
2021	Botafogo	10	(0)
2022	Malabo Kings		
2023	Ceará	10	(0)
2024	União de Natal	5	(0)
2024–	Atlético Piauiense	0	(0)

International career^{‡}
2011–2016	Equatorial Guinea	4	(1)
- * Club domestic league appearances and goals as of 24 May 2024 ‡ National team caps and goals as of 26 June 2011 (before the 2011 FIFA Women's World Cup)

Ana Cristina da Silva (born 12 December 1985), commonly known as Cris, is a Brazilian professional footballer who plays as a midfielder for Campeonato Piauiense Feminino club Atlético Piauiense.

Cris was part of the Equatorial Guinea women's national football team at the 2011 FIFA Women's World Cup.

On 5 October 2017, Cris and other nine Brazilian footballers were declared by FIFA as ineligible to play for Equatorial Guinea.

== Early life ==
Ana Cristina da Silva was born on 12 December 1985 in Três Rios, a municipality of the state of Rio de Janeiro in Brazil.

== Club career ==
While playing for Associação Ferroviária de Esportes (commonly known as Ferroviária) in Brazil, she was a member of the team that won the Campeonato Brasileiro de Futebol Feminino league and the Copa do Brasil de Futebol Feminino cup double in 2014.

== International career ==
After being nationalised as an Equatoguinean, she was selected as a member of the Equatorial Guinea women's national football team for the 2011 FIFA Women's World Cup in Germany. At the time of being named in the squad, she was unattached at club level. When da Silva was a member of the Equatorial Guinea team that won the 2012 African Women's Championship, she was one of 11 out of the 21 players who were naturalized Brazilians playing as Equatoguineans.

She continued to play for the Equatoguinean women's team through the qualifying matches for the 2016 Summer Olympics in Rio de Janeiro, Brazil. However, the team were expelled from the tournament after fielding a player with fraudulent documentation.

=== International goals ===
Scores and results list Equatorial Guinea's goal tally first

No.	Date	Venue	Opponent	Score	Result	Competition
1	17 June 2011	Stade Jos Becker, Niederanven, Luxembourg	Luxembourg	5–0	8–0	Friendly
