= Erika Skarbø =

Norwegian footballer (born 1987)

Erika Espeseth Skarbø (born 12 June 1987 in Ålesund) is a Norwegian former footballer who played as a goalkeeper. She has played for IL Hødd and Fortuna Ålesund.

Skarbø is also a member of the Norway women's national football team, having made her senior team debut on 12 February 2007 in a match against France. Skarbø has made 8 senior appearances for Norway, and has 45 youth team caps. She was the reserve keeper for the Norwegian squad that placed fourth in the 2007 Women's World Cup held in China.

After Skarbø competed with Christine Colombo Nilsen and Ingrid Hjelmseth for the No. 1 goalkeeper position, Bjarne Berntsen announced on 2 May 2008 that Skarbø would be Norway's new No. 1 GK, replacing long-time keeper, Bente Nordby.

On 9 June 2008 Skarbø was named to the Norwegian roster for the 2008 Summer Olympics held in Beijing, China

She lived in Dalgety Bay, in Fife, Scotland from age 6 to 9, before moving back to live in Norway's major shipbuilding town of Ulsteinvik on the west coast near Ålesund, where her father Dag is a director at Rolls-Royce Marine.

At the age of 18 in 2005 she played two international matches in goal in one afternoon.

In January 2009 Skarbø had surgery for a right scaphoid (wrist) fracture that had given her trouble for five years but had remained undiagnosed for that time. She hopes to resume football later in 2009. In July she returned to football training with Arna-Bjørnar as an outplayer but was not yet able to stand in goal with wrist pain still present. Later in October it was announced that she was now able to resume training as a goalkeeper. She returned to the football field on 15 January 2010 playing for Arna-Bjørnar in a training match against Sandviken in Bergen and a few weeks later was selected to join Norway's Under-23 team for a tournament at La Manga, Spain.

Skarbø took over as captain of Arna-Bjørnar at the beginning of the 2010 season and the club had a successful first half of the season. On 27 June, with Arna-Bjørnar lying in third place in the Toppserien table, she broke her left arm after making a high save in a home match against Kolbotn. She returned in September.

On 7 March 2011 Skarbø captained Norway's senior team in a match in the Algarve Cup, a match that Japan won 1-0.

Erika Skarbø is studying psychology, in particular corporate psychology and industrial conflict resolution.
