= Jumária =

Brazilian footballer (born 1979)

Personal information
- Full name: Jumária Barbosa de Santana
- Date of birth: 8 May 1979 (age 47)
- Place of birth: Salvador, Bahia, Brazil
- Height: 1.63 m (5 ft 4 in)
- Position: Midfielder

Senior career*
Years	Team	Apps	(Gls)
2007–2019	São Francisco	44+	(5+)
2022	Bahia	7	(2)
2023	Capital CF	4	(0)

International career^{‡}
2008–2016	Equatorial Guinea	3	(0)
- * Club domestic league appearances and goals as of 13 May 2023 ‡ National team caps and goals as of 16:28, 1 October 2015 (UTC)

Jumária Barbosa de Santana (born 8 May 1979), commonly known as Jumária, is a Brazilian former professional footballer who played as a midfielder.

On 5 October 2017, FIFA declared Jumária and other nine Brazilian footballers ineligible to play for Equatorial Guinea.

== Honors and awards ==
=== National team ===
Equatorial Guinea

- Africa Women Cup of Nations: 2008, 2012
