= Dulce (footballer) =

Brazilian footballer (born 1982)

Personal information
- Full name: Dúlcia Maria Davi
- Date of birth: 18 January 1982 (age 44)
- Place of birth: São Paulo, Brazil
- Height: 1.66 m (5 ft 5 in)
- Position: Centre back

Senior career*
Years	Team	Apps	(Gls)
1997	Portuguesa		
1998–1999	São Bento		
2000–2001	Palmeiras		
2002–2004	UniSant'Anna		
2005	Salto		
2006	São Caetano		
2007–2008	Palmeiras/CEUNSP		
2009–2010	Corinthians		
2010	São Caetano		
2011	Centro Olímpico		
2012	América Natal		
2012	XV de Piracicaba		
2013	São Caetano		
2013–2014	Kindermann	7	(0)
2015	São Paulo FC		
2016	Vitória das Tabocas	3	(0)
2017	Osasco Audax	1	(0)
2019	São José	8	(0)
2020–2021	Real Brasília	0	(0)
2021–2023	Real Ariquemes	4	(0)

International career^{‡}
2011–2016	Equatorial Guinea	3	(0)
- * Club domestic league appearances and goals as of 19 June 2022 ‡ National team caps and goals as of 26 June 2011 (before the 2011 FIFA Women's World Cup)

Dúlcia Maria Davi (born 18 January 1982), commonly known as Dulce, is a Brazilian professional footballer who plays as a centre back.

== Career ==
Dulce was part of the Equatorial Guinea women's national football team at the 2011 FIFA Women's World Cup.

On 5 October 2017, Dulce and other nine Brazilian footballers were declared by FIFA as ineligible to play for Equatorial Guinea.
