= Eli Landsem =

Norwegian footballer and coach (born 1962)

Personal information
- Date of birth: 22 March 1962 (age 64)
- Place of birth: Rindal, Norway
- Position: Defender

Senior career*
Years	Team	Apps	(Gls)
- Asker

International career^{‡}
1979–1985	Norway	15	(1)

Managerial career
- 1986: Troll
- 1987: Lørenskog
- 1988: Rindals/Troll
- 1989: Norway Under-16
- 1990–1993: Asker
- 1994–1996: Rælingen men
- 1997–2003: Asker
- 2004–2005: Fortuna Hjørring
- 2006–2007: Asker
- 2009–2012: Norway
- 2015: Fjellhamar men
- 2018–: Vålerenga (director of sports)
- * Club domestic league appearances and goals as of 4 October 2018 ‡ National team caps and goals as of 14:16, 4 October 2014 (UTC)

Eli Landsem (born 22 March 1962) is a Norwegian former international footballer who was the coach of the Norway women's national football team between 2009 and 2012.

== Career ==
As a player, Landsem won 15 caps for Norway, scoring one goal. She made her Norway debut at the age of 17, and went on to play in the 1984 European Competition for Women's Football, Norway's first UEFA tournament appearance. At club level Landsem played for Asker and collected three First Division winner's medals and two Norwegian Women's Cup winner's medals.

From 1994 until 1996 Landsem coached Rælingen in 3. divisjon, the regionalised fourth tier of men's football in Norway. She was the first female to coach a male team at such a high level of the Norwegian football league system.

Landsem replaced Bjarne Berntsen as national team coach in October 2009. She qualified the team for the 2011 FIFA Women's World Cup in Germany, but Norway crashed out in the first round. Results did not improve and a review carried out by Football Association of Norway's (NFF) Nils Johan Semb revealed that some players were unhappy with Landsem. Her contract was not renewed beyond 31 December 2012 and veteran Even Pellerud returned to the role.

From November 2014 to March 2015 she managed another men's team, Fjellhamar FK, but resigned due to lack of available players. Ahead of the 2018 season she was named director of sports of Vålerenga Fotball Damer.

== International appearances ==
As of 4 October 2014.

Norway national team
Year	Apps	Goals
1979	5	0
1980	1	0
1981	2	0
1982	4	1
1983	1	0
1984	1	0
1985	1	0
Total	15	1

== International goals ==
Scores and results list Norway's goal tally first.

#	Date	Venue	Opponent	Result	Competition	Scored
1	28 August 1982	Tønsberg	Iceland	2–2	UEFA Euro 1984 Qual.	1
