= 2010 African Women's Championship squads =

This article describes the squads for the 2010 African Women's Championship.

== Group A ==
=== Mali ===
Head coach: Moustapha L. Traore

No.	Pos.	Player	Date of birth (age)	Caps	Club
1	GK	Fatoumata Karentao	8 November 1990 (aged 19)		(Mali) AS Real Bamako
2		Malado Maïga	30 June 1986 (aged 24)		(Mali) Super Lionnes
3	DF	Salimata Kone	9 March 1990 (aged 20)		(Mali) AS Mandé
4	DF	Aminata Sacko	27 August 1984 (aged 26)		(Mali) Super Lionnes
5		Oumou Coulibaly	7 January 1990 (aged 20)		(Mali) FC Amazones
6		Yacare Coulibaly	11 November 1986 (aged 23)		(Mali) FC Amazones
7	FW	Fatoumata Diarra	15 April 1986 (aged 24)		(Mali) AS Mandé
8	MF	Fatoumata Doumbia	10 February 1986 (aged 24)		(Mali) Super Lionnes
9	FW	Bassira Touré	6 January 1990 (aged 20)		(Mali) AS Mandé
10		Diaty N'Diaye	25 March 1984 (aged 26)		(Mali) AS Mandé
11		Rokiatou Samake	8 October 1984 (aged 26)		(Mali) AS Mandé
12	MF	Mariam Keita	30 May 1990 (aged 20)		(Mali) AS Real Bamako
13		Nafissatou Keita	17 April 1994 (aged 16)		(Mali) Super Club
14		Kebe Traore	4 May 1994 (aged 16)		(Mali) AS Real Bamako
15		Hawa Coulibaly	26 March 1984 (aged 26)		(Mali) USFAS Bamako
16		Oumou Karambe	28 December 1987 (aged 22)		(Mali) AS Mandé
17		Aïcha Konaté	12 August 1984 (aged 26)		(Mali) Super Lionnes
18	MF	Aïchata Doumbia	20 August 1985 (aged 25)		(Mali) USFAS Bamako
19		Ramata Keita	21 April 1991 (aged 19)		(Mali) FC Amazones
20	GK	Goundo Samake	2 May 1992 (aged 18)		(Mali) Patronnage
21	FW	Hawa Tangara	12 January 1993 (aged 17)		(Mali) AS Real Bamako

=== Nigeria ===
Head coach: Ngozi Eucharia Uche

No.	Pos.	Player	Date of birth (age)	Caps	Club
1	GK	Precious Dede	18 January 1980 (aged 30)		
2	DF	Osinachi Ohale	21 December 1991 (aged 18)		
3	DF	Lorretia Sadoh	10 June 1986 (aged 24)		
4	MF	Perpetua Nkwocha	3 January 1976 (aged 34)		
5	DF	Josephine Chukwunonye	19 March 1992 (aged 18)		
6	DF	Helen Ukaonu	17 May 1991 (aged 19)		
7	FW	Stella Mbachu	16 April 1978 (aged 32)		
8	FW	Ebere Orji	23 December 1992 (aged 17)		
9	FW	Desire Oparanozie	17 December 1993 (aged 16)		
10	MF	Rita Chikwelu	6 March 1988 (aged 22)		
11	MF	Glory Iroka	3 January 1990 (aged 20)		
12	GK	Tochukwu Oluehi	2 May 1987 (aged 23)		
13	MF	Amarachi Okoronkwo	12 December 1992 (aged 17)		
14	FW	Ngozi Okobi	14 December 1993 (aged 16)		
15	DF	Onome Ebi	8 May 1983 (aged 27)		
16	DF	Ulunma Jerome	11 April 1988 (aged 22)		
17	FW	Francisca Ordega	19 October 1993 (aged 17)		
18	FW	Loveth Ayila	6 September 1994 (aged 16)		
19	DF	Gladys Akpa	1 January 1986 (aged 24)		
20	MF	Esther Sunday	13 March 1992 (aged 18)		
21		Chioma Ajagba	23 March 1986 (aged 24)		

=== South Africa ===
Head coach: August Makalakalane

No.	Pos.	Player	Date of birth (age)	Caps	Club
1	GK	Yolula Tsawe	23 June 1992 (aged 18)		
2	MF	Kylie Louw	15 January 1989 (aged 21)		
3	DF	Simphiwe Dludlu	21 September 1987 (aged 23)		
4	DF	Amanda Sister	1 March 1990 (aged 20)		
5	DF	Janine van Wyk	17 April 1987 (aged 23)		
6		Yola Jafta	26 April 1991 (aged 19)		
7		Mamphashe Popela	12 July 1986 (aged 24)		
8		Simphiwe Masina	26 July 1985 (aged 25)		
9	MF	Amanda Dlamini	22 July 1988 (aged 22)		
10	MF	Marry Ntsweng	19 December 1989 (aged 20)		
11	FW	Noko Matlou	30 September 1985 (aged 25)		
12		Nthabeleng Modiko	20 July 1986 (aged 24)		
13	MF	Gabisile Hlumbane	20 December 1986 (aged 23)		
14	DF	Sanah Mollo	30 January 1987 (aged 23)		
15	MF	Mamello Makhabane	24 February 1988 (aged 22)		
16	GK	Thokozile Mndaweni	8 August 1981 (aged 29)		
17		Elson Matjila	5 April 1986 (aged 24)		
18		Nocawe Skiti	13 May 1989 (aged 21)		
19	MF	Leandra Smeda	22 July 1989 (aged 21)		
20	FW	Jermaine Seoposenwe	12 October 1993 (aged 17)		
21		Siphiwe Mnguni	25 May 1987 (aged 23)		

=== Tanzania ===
Head coach:

No.	Pos.	Player	Date of birth (age)	Caps	Club
1	GK	Mwasiti Juma Selemani	28 November 1986 (aged 23)		(Tanzania) Real Tanzanite FC
3		Neema Jacob Kuga	31 January 1990 (aged 20)		Mndela FC
4		Fridiana John Daud	13 December 1987 (aged 22)		JKT FC
5		Mwanaidi Abdallah Tamba	28 December 1989 (aged 20)		Mburahati FC
6		Mariam Azizi Fakili	{{{age}}}	{{{caps}}}	{{{club}}}
7		Mary Gabriel Masatu	{{{age}}}	{{{caps}}}	{{{club}}}
8		Esther Fred Chabruma	{{{age}}}	{{{caps}}}	{{{club}}}
9		Fatuma Mustapha Swalehe	{{{age}}}	{{{caps}}}	{{{club}}}
10		Hellen Peter Tolla	{{{age}}}	{{{caps}}}	{{{club}}}
11		Pulkeria Ignas Charaji	{{{age}}}	{{{caps}}}	{{{club}}}
12		Fatuma Khatibu Salum	{{{age}}}	{{{caps}}}	{{{club}}}
13		Etoe Khamis Mlenzi	{{{age}}}	{{{caps}}}	{{{club}}}
14		Asha Sada Rashid	{{{age}}}	{{{caps}}}	{{{club}}}
15		Mwanahamis Omary Shurua	{{{age}}}	{{{caps}}}	{{{club}}}
16		Sophia Edward Mwasikili	{{{age}}}	{{{caps}}}	{{{club}}}
17		Fatuma Bashiri Makusanya	{{{age}}}	{{{caps}}}	{{{club}}}
18		Maimuna Saidi Mkane	{{{age}}}	{{{caps}}}	{{{club}}}
19		Mwajuma Abdillahi	{{{age}}}	{{{caps}}}	{{{club}}}
20		Fatuma Omary Jawadu	{{{age}}}	{{{caps}}}	{{{club}}}

== Group B ==
=== Algeria ===
Head coach: Azzedine Chih

No.	Pos.	Player	Date of birth (age)	Caps	Club
1	GK	Nadjet Fedoul	28 October 1981 (aged 29)		
2	DF	Isma Ouadah	19 January 1983 (aged 27)		
3		Yasmina Benatia	27 May 1987 (aged 23)		
4	DF	Fatima Sekouane	21 May 1983 (aged 27)		(Algeria) Afak Relizane
5	MF	Sabrina Delhoum	21 May 1976 (aged 34)		
6	MF	Leïla Meflah	9 June 1982 (aged 28)		(France) Bagneux
7	MF	Safia Bengueddoudj	31 January 1986 (aged 24)		(France) Saint-Étienne
8	MF	Nora Hamou Maamar	18 May 1983 (aged 27)		(France) Montpellier
9	FW	Lilia Boumrar	20 October 1988 (aged 22)		(France) Bagneux
10	DF	Habiba Sadou	1 November 1986 (aged 23)		
11	FW	Naïma Bouhenni	23 October 1985 (aged 25)		(Algeria) Afak Relizane
12	FW	Dalila Zerrouki	1 February 1982 (aged 28)		(France) Claix
13	FW	Nabila Imloul	11 December 1982 (aged 27)		
14	MF	Sabbah Meftah Saoues	15 August 1984 (aged 26)		(France) Rodez AF
15	MF	Mounia Houheche	5 November 1992 (aged 17)		
16	GK	Nassira Rezig	4 November 1983 (aged 26)		
17	MF	Lydia Miraoui	24 September 1991 (aged 19)		(Spain) L'Estartit
18	DF	Farida Yahi	7 October 1981 (aged 29)		
19	MF	Sabrina Moussaoui	25 March 1984 (aged 26)		
20	DF	Leïla Maatouk	24 October 1981 (aged 29)		
21	GK	Amina Haleyi	10 September 1992 (aged 18)		

=== Cameroon ===
Head coach: Enow Ngachu

No.	Pos.	Player	Date of birth (age)	Caps	Club
1	GK	Adrienne Ndongo Fouda	15 June 1990 (aged 20)		
2	FW	Christine Manie	4 May 1984 (aged 26)		
3	FW	Ajara Nchout	12 January 1993 (aged 17)		
4	DF	Rosine Siewe Yamaleu	25 November 1991 (aged 18)		
5	DF	Augustine Ejangue	18 January 1989 (aged 21)		
6		Jacqueline Mathio Epee	10 October 1993 (aged 17)		
7	FW	Gabrielle Onguéné	25 February 1989 (aged 21)		
8	FW	Marlyse Ngo Ndoumbouk	3 January 1985 (aged 25)		
9	FW	Madeleine Ngono Mani	16 October 1983 (aged 27)		
10	MF	Bébéy Beyene	10 May 1992 (aged 18)		
11	DF	Bibi Medoua	9 August 1993 (aged 17)		
12	MF	Françoise Bella	9 March 1983 (aged 27)		
13	DF	Cathy Bou Ndjouh	7 November 1987 (aged 22)		
14	FW	Henriette Akaba	7 June 1992 (aged 18)		
15	DF	Ysis Sonkeng	20 September 1989 (aged 21)		
16	GK	Julienne Jumbone Toldo	9 September 1992 (aged 18)		
17	FW	Gaëlle Enganamouit	9 June 1992 (aged 18)		
18	FW	Jeannette Yango	12 June 1993 (aged 17)		
19	DF	Joséphine Ngandi	10 February 1992 (aged 18)		
20	FW	Carine Yoh	10 April 1993 (aged 17)		
21		Drusille Laure Ngako Tchimi	23 June 1987 (aged 23)		

=== Equatorial Guinea ===
Head coach: Jean-Paul Mpila

No.	Pos.	Player	Date of birth (age)	Caps	Club
1	GK	Haoua Yao	2 July 1979 (aged 31)		
2	DF	Bruna Amarante da Silva	12 May 1984 (aged 26)		
3	DF	Ghyslaine Nke	8 June 1989 (aged 21)		
4	DF	Carolina Conceição Martins Pereira	18 February 1983 (aged 27)		
5	MF	Bilguissa Simporé	9 April 1985 (aged 25)		
6	MF	Doceline Theolore	12 March 1982 (aged 28)		
7	FW	Blessing Diala	8 December 1989 (aged 20)		
8	FW	Salimata Simporé	29 January 1987 (aged 23)		
9	DF	Dorine Chuigoué	28 November 1988 (aged 21)		
10	FW	Genoveva Añonman	19 April 1989 (aged 21)		
11	MF	Natalia Abeso	5 September 1986 (aged 24)		
12	MF	Sinforosa Eyang Nguema Nchama	26 April 1994 (aged 16)		
13	MF	Lucrecia Ngui	23 August 1988 (aged 22)		
14	MF	Jumária Barbosa de Santana	8 May 1979 (aged 31)		
15	FW	Gloria Chinasa	8 December 1987 (aged 22)		
16	FW	Jade Boho	30 August 1986 (aged 24)		
17	DF	Téclaire Bille	7 July 1988 (aged 22)		
18	GK	Mirian Silva de Paixão	25 February 1982 (aged 28)		
19	MF	Fatoumata Ndiaye	27 March 1989 (aged 21)		
20	FW	Dandara Bessa dos Santos	18 September 1987 (aged 23)		
21	DF	Jacinta Adá Envó	12 May 1995 (aged 15)		

=== Ghana ===
Head coach: Anthony Edusel

No.	Pos.	Player	Date of birth (age)	Caps	Club
1	GK	Gladys Quansah	1 September 1983 (aged 27)		
2	DF	Aminatu Ibrahim	3 January 1979 (aged 31)		
3		Ama Saabi	16 September 1986 (aged 24)		
4		Sakina Abdul Mumin	24 November 1985 (aged 24)		
5		Veronica Ashitey	9 March 1985 (aged 25)		
6	MF	Florence Okoe	12 November 1984 (aged 25)		
7	FW	Safia Rahman	5 May 1986 (aged 24)		
8		Akua Sika	10 July 1989 (aged 21)		
9	FW	Diana Ankomah	19 September 1989 (aged 21)		
10	MF	Adjoa Bayor	17 May 1979 (aged 31)		
11	DF	Grace Asare	12 October 1989 (aged 21)		
12	FW	Agnes Aduako	25 December 1989 (aged 20)		
13	DF	Yaa Avoe	1 July 1982 (aged 28)		
14	MF	Patience Kpobi	19 November 1984 (aged 25)		
15	FW	Leticia Zikpi	12 October 1986 (aged 24)		
16	GK	Memunatu Sulemana	4 November 1977 (aged 32)		
17	FW	Portia Boakye	17 April 1989 (aged 21)		
18		Doris Nettey	2 October 1987 (aged 23)		
19	MF	Mary Berko	1 June 1988 (aged 22)		
20		Nancy Coleman	10 September 1991 (aged 19)		
21		Leila Mohammed	13 November 1985 (aged 24)		
