= Football at the 2012 Summer Olympics – Women's tournament – Group F =

== Standings ==
Pos	Team	Pld	W	D	L	GF	GA	GD	Pts	Qualification
1	Sweden	3	1	2	0	6	3	+3	5	Qualified for the quarter-finals
2	Japan	3	1	2	0	2	1	+1	5	Qualified for the quarter-finals
3	Canada	3	1	1	1	6	4	+2	4	Qualified for the quarter-finals
4	South Africa	3	0	1	2	1	7	−6	1	

Source: IOC

== Japan vs Canada ==
25 July 2012
17:00

Japan	2–1	Canada
Kawasumi 33'; Miyama 44'	Report	Tancredi 55'

City of Coventry Stadium, Coventry
Attendance: 14,119
Referee: Kirsi Heikkinen (Finland)

Japan	Canada

GK	1	Miho Fukumoto
RB	2	Yukari Kinga
CB	3	Azusa Iwashimizu
CB	4	Saki Kumagai
LB	5	Aya Sameshima
CM	10	Homare Sawa
CM	6	Mizuho Sakaguchi
RM	8	Aya Miyama (c)
LM	9	Nahomi Kawasumi
CF	17	Yūki Ōgimi
CF	11	Shinobu Ohno	(substituted off) 65'
Substitutions:
FW	7	Kozue Ando	(substituted on) 65'
Manager:
Norio Sasaki

GK	18	Erin McLeod
DF	4	Carmelina Moscato
DF	7	Rhian Wilkinson	(substituted off) 71'
DF	9	Candace Chapman
DF	10	Lauren Sesselmann	(substituted off) 69'
MF	6	Kaylyn Kyle	(substituted off) 76'
MF	8	Diana Matheson
MF	11	Desiree Scott
MF	13	Sophie Schmidt
FW	12	Christine Sinclair (c)
FW	14	Melissa Tancredi
Substitutions:
DF	3	Chelsea Stewart	(substituted on) 69'
DF	5	Robyn Gayle	(substituted on) 71'
MF	15	Kelly Parker	(substituted on) 76'
Manager:
(United Kingdom) John Herdman

Assistant referees:
Anu Jokela (Finland)
Tonja Paavola (Finland)
Fourth official:
Thalia Mitsi (Greece)

== Sweden vs South Africa ==
25 July 2012
19:45

Sweden	4–1	South Africa
Fischer 7'; Dahlkvist 20'; Schelin 21', 63'	Report; Report	Modise 60'

City of Coventry Stadium, Coventry
Attendance: 18,290
Referee: Salomé di Iorio (Argentina)

Sweden	South Africa

GK	1	Hedvig Lindahl
DF	2	Linda Sembrant
DF	3	Emma Berglund
DF	6	Sara Thunebro
DF	13	Lina Nilsson
MF	5	Nilla Fischer (c)	(substituted off) 60'
MF	7	Lisa Dahlkvist
MF	12	Marie Hammarström	(substituted off) 84'
MF	15	Caroline Seger
FW	8	Lotta Schelin	(substituted off) 73'
FW	10	Sofia Jakobsson
Substitutions:
MF	11	Antonia Göransson	(substituted on) 84'
MF	14	Johanna Almgren	(substituted on) 60'
FW	9	Kosovare Asllani	(substituted on) 73'
Manager:
Thomas Dennerby

GK	1	Roxanne Barker
DF	3	Nothando Vilakazi	(yellow card) 86'
DF	4	Amanda Sister
DF	5	Janine van Wyk
MF	8	Kylie Louw
MF	9	Amanda Dlamini (c)
MF	11	Noko Matlou		(substituted off) 62'
MF	12	Portia Modise
MF	15	Refiloe Jane
FW	16	Mpumi Nyandeni
FW	17	Andisiwe Mgcoyi		(substituted off) 80'
Substitutions:
MF	10	Marry Ntsweng		(substituted on) 62'
FW	14	Sanah Mollo		(substituted on) 80'
Manager:
Joseph Mkhonza

Assistant referees:
Mariana Corbo (Uruguay)
Maria Rocco (Argentina)
Fourth official:
Bibiana Steinhaus (Germany)

== Japan vs Sweden ==
28 July 2012
12:00

Japan	0–0	Sweden
	Report; Report

City of Coventry Stadium, Coventry
Attendance: 14,160
Referee: Quetzalli Alvarado (Mexico)

Japan	Sweden

GK	1	Miho Fukumoto
RB	2	Yukari Kinga
CB	3	Azusa Iwashimizu
CB	4	Saki Kumagai
LB	5	Aya Sameshima
CM	10	Homare Sawa	(substituted off) 59'
CM	6	Mizuho Sakaguchi
RM	8	Aya Miyama (c)
LM	9	Nahomi Kawasumi
CF	17	Yūki Ōgimi	(substituted off) 90+2'
CF	11	Shinobu Ohno	(substituted off) 81'
Substitutions:
MF	14	Asuna Tanaka	(substituted on) 59'
FW	16	Mana Iwabuchi	(substituted on) 81'
FW	7	Kozue Ando	(substituted on) 90+2'
Manager:
Norio Sasaki

GK	1	Hedvig Lindahl
DF	2	Linda Sembrant
DF	3	Emma Berglund
DF	4	Annica Svensson
DF	6	Sara Thunebro (c)	(yellow card) 22'
MF	7	Lisa Dahlkvist		(substituted off) 87'
MF	12	Marie Hammarström
MF	14	Johanna Almgren		(substituted off) 63'
MF	15	Caroline Seger
FW	8	Lotta Schelin
FW	10	Sofia Jakobsson		(substituted off) 78'
Substitutions:
MF	9	Kosovare Asllani		(substituted on) 63'
DF	13	Lina Nilsson		(substituted on) 78'
MF	11	Antonia Göransson		(substituted on) 87'
Manager:
Thomas Dennerby

Assistant referees:
Mayte Chávez (Mexico)
Shirley Perello (Honduras)
Fourth official:
Kari Seitz (United States)

== Canada vs South Africa ==
28 July 2012
14:45

Canada	3–0	South Africa
Tancredi 7'; Sinclair 58', 86'	Report

City of Coventry Stadium, Coventry
Attendance: 14,753
Referee: Christina Pedersen (Norway)

Canada	South Africa

GK	1	Karina LeBlanc
DF	4	Carmelina Moscato
DF	5	Robyn Gayle	(substituted off) 68'
DF	7	Rhian Wilkinson
DF	10	Lauren Sesselmann
MF	6	Kaylyn Kyle	(substituted off) 74'
MF	8	Diana Matheson
MF	11	Desiree Scott
MF	13	Sophie Schmidt
FW	12	Christine Sinclair (c)
FW	14	Melissa Tancredi	(substituted off) 87'
Substitutions:
MF	3	Chelsea Stewart	(substituted on) 68'
FW	16	Jonelle Filigno	(substituted on) 74'
MF	17	Brittany Timko	(substituted on) 87'
Manager:
(United Kingdom) John Herdman

GK	18	Thokozile Mndaweni
DF	4	Amanda Sister
DF	5	Janine van Wyk
DF	6	Zamandosi Cele
MF	8	Kylie Louw
MF	9	Amanda Dlamini (c)
MF	13	Gabisile Hlumbane
MF	15	Refiloe Jane
MF	16	Mpumi Nyandeni
FW	12	Portia Modise	(yellow card) 53'	(substituted off) 83'
FW	17	Andisiwe Mgcoyi		(substituted off) 69'
Substitutions:
FW	14	Sanah Mollo		(substituted on) 69'
FW	11	Noko Matlou		(substituted on) 83'
Manager:
Joseph Mkhonza

Assistant referees:
Hege Steinlund (Norway)
Lada Rojc (Croatia)
Fourth official:
Kirsi Heikkinen (Finland)

== Japan vs South Africa ==
31 July 2012
14:30

Japan	0–0	South Africa
	Report

Millennium Stadium, Cardiff
Attendance: 24,202
Referee: Efthalia Mitsi (Greece)

Japan	South Africa

GK	18	Ayumi Kaihori
RB	2	Yukari Kinga
CB	3	Azusa Iwashimizu
CB	4	Saki Kumagai
LB	12	Kyoko Yano
CM	14	Asuna Tanaka
CM	8	Aya Miyama (c)	(substituted off) 77'
RM	15	Megumi Takase
LM	16	Mana Iwabuchi	(substituted off) 58'
CF	13	Karina Maruyama	(substituted off) 90+3'
CF	7	Kozue Ando
Substitutions:
MF	9	Nahomi Kawasumi	(substituted on) 58'
MF	6	Mizuho Sakaguchi	(substituted on) 77'
FW	17	Yuki Ogimi	(substituted on) 90+3'
Manager:
Norio Sasaki

GK	18	Thokozile Mndaweni
DF	3	Nothando Vilakazi
DF	5	Janine van Wyk
DF	6	Zamandosi Cele
DF	15	Refiloe Jane
MF	8	Kylie Louw	(substituted off) 90'
MF	9	Amanda Dlamini (c)
MF	13	Gabisile Hlumbane	(substituted off) 61'
MF	16	Mpumi Nyandeni
FW	11	Noku Matlou	(substituted off) 61'
FW	12	Portia Modise
Substitutions:
DF	4	Amanda Sister	(substituted on) 61'
FW	14	Sanah Mollo	(substituted on) 61'
MF	10	Marry Ntsweng	(substituted on) 90'
Manager:
Joseph Mkhonza

Assistant referees:
María Villa (Spain)
Yolanda Parga (Spain)
Fourth official:
Kari Seitz (United States)

== Canada vs Sweden ==
31 July 2012
14:30

Canada	2–2	Sweden
Tancredi 43', 84'	Report; Report	Hammarström 14'; Jakobsson 16'

St James' Park, Newcastle
Attendance: 12,719
Referee: Hong Eun-ah (South Korea)

Canada	Sweden

GK	18	Erin McLeod
DF	4	Carmelina Moscato
DF	7	Rhian Wilkinson
DF	10	Lauren Sesselmann
DF	20	Marie-Ève Nault	(substituted off) 86'
MF	8	Diana Matheson
MF	11	Desiree Scott
MF	13	Sophie Schmidt	(substituted off) 88'
FW	12	Christine Sinclair (c)
FW	14	Melissa Tancredi
FW	16	Jonelle Filigno	(substituted off) 75'
Substitutions:
MF	6	Kaylyn Kyle	(substituted on) 75'
MF	3	Chelsea Stewart	(substituted on) 86'
MF	15	Kelly Parker	(substituted on) 88'
Manager:
(United Kingdom) John Herdman

GK	1	Hedvig Lindahl
DF	2	Linda Sembrant
DF	3	Emma Berglund
DF	6	Sara Thunebro
DF	13	Lina Nilsson	(yellow card) 61'
MF	5	Nilla Fischer (c)	(yellow card) 29'	(substituted off) 53'
MF	9	Kosovare Asllani		(substituted off) 63'
MF	12	Marie Hammarström
MF	15	Caroline Seger
FW	8	Lotta Schelin
FW	10	Sofia Jakobsson
Substitutions:
MF	7	Lisa Dahlkvist		(substituted on) 53'
MF	14	Johanna Almgren		(substituted on) 63'
Manager:
Thomas Dennerby

Assistant referees:
Sarah Ho (Australia)
Kim Kyoung-Min (South Korea)
Fourth official:
Therese Neguel (Cameroon)
