= South Africa at the 2012 Summer Olympics =

- IOC code: RSA
- NOC: South African Sports Confederation and Olympic Committee
- Website: www.sascoc.co.za

in London
- Competitors: 125 in 17 sports
- Flag bearers: Caster Semenya (opening); Oscar Pistorius (closing)
- Medals Ranked 20th: Gold 4 Silver 1 Bronze 1 Total 6

Summer Olympics appearances (overview)
- 1904; 1908; 1912; 1920; 1924; 1928; 1932; 1936; 1948; 1952; 1956; 1960; 1964–1988; 1992; 1996; 2000; 2004; 2008; 2012; 2016; 2020; 2024; 2028

South Africa competed at the 2012 Summer Olympics in London, United Kingdom, from 27 July to 12 August 2012. This was the nation's eighteenth participation overall and sixth consecutive appearance at the Summer Olympics in the post-apartheid era. The South African Sports Confederation and Olympic Committee (SASCOC) sent a total of 125 athletes to the Games, 67 men and 58 women, to compete in 17 sports. Field hockey and women's football were the only team-based sports in which South Africa were representation at these Olympic Games. There was only a single competitor in archery, BMX cycling, judo, shooting and weightlifting.

Notable South African athletes included track stars Oscar Pistorius and Caster Semenya. Pistorius, a four-time Paralympic champion, set South Africa's historical record as the first double-leg amputee to compete at the Olympics. Semenya, a middle-distance runner and a world champion who had been subjected to gender testing in 2009, became the nation's flag bearer at the opening ceremony. The South African team also featured past Olympic medalists, including swimmer Roland Mark Schoeman, who won a full set of medals in Athens, and long jumper Godfrey Khotso Mokoena, who took silver in Beijing.

After suffering a major setback in Beijing, South Africa recaptured its previous successes in London with a total of six Olympic medals (four gold, one silver, and one bronze). Among the nation's medalists were swimmers Cameron van der Burgh and Chad le Clos, who each won gold in their events, with Le Clos also winning a silver. Van der Burgh broke both an Olympic record and a world record in men's breaststroke swimming. Meanwhile, le Clos surpassed the defending champion Michael Phelps to claim the title in one of the men's butterfly events. For the first time in its history, South Africa won Olympic medals in rowing and in sprint canoeing.

== Medalists ==
Medal	Name	Sport	Event	Date
Gold	Cameron van der Burgh	Swimming	Men's 100 m breaststroke	29 July
Gold	Chad le Clos	Swimming	Men's 200 m butterfly	31 July
Gold	James Thompson; Matthew Brittain; John Smith; Sizwe Ndlovu	Rowing	Men's lightweight coxless four	2 August
Gold	Caster Semenya	Athletics	Women's 800 m	11 August
Silver	Chad le Clos	Swimming	Men's 100 m butterfly	3 August
Bronze	Bridgitte Hartley	Canoeing	Women's K-1 500 m	9 August

Medals by sport
Sport	1st place, gold medalist(s)	2nd place, silver medalist(s)	3rd place, bronze medalist(s)	Total
Swimming	2	1	0	3
Rowing	1	0	0	1
Canoeing	0	0	1	1
Athletics	1	0	0	1
Total	4	1	1	6

== Archery ==
Athlete	Event	Ranking round		Round of 64	Round of 32	Round of 16	Quarterfinals	Semifinals	Final / BM	
Athlete	Event	Score	Seed	Opposition Score	Opposition Score	Opposition Score	Opposition Score	Opposition Score	Opposition Score	Rank
Karen Hultzer	Women's individual	631	46	Lionetti (ITA) (19); L 2–6	Did not advance					

== Athletics ==
South African athletes have entered the following events:

Key

- Note – Ranks given for track events are within the athlete's heat only
- Q = Qualified for the next round
- q = Qualified for the next round as a fastest loser or, in field events, by position without achieving the qualifying target
- NR = National record
- N/A = Round not applicable for the event
- Bye = Athlete not required to compete in round

Men

Ofentse Mogawane was injured in a crash during the first heat of the 4 × 400 m relay. On appeal, South Africa was entered into the final with Louis van Zyl replacing Mogawane. Oscar Pistorius made Olympic history, becoming the first double leg amputee ever to participate in the Olympic Games.

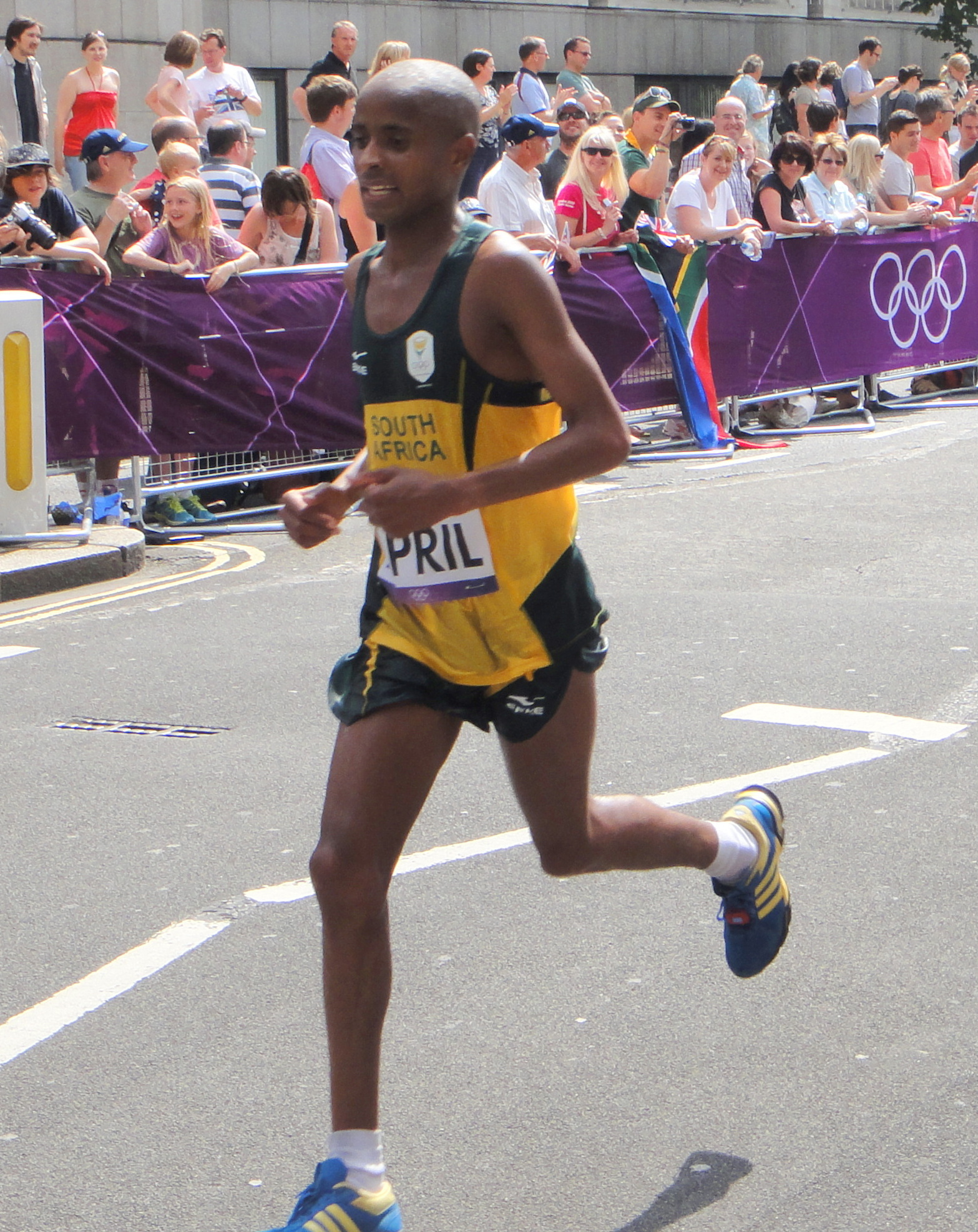
Lusapho April in men's marathon

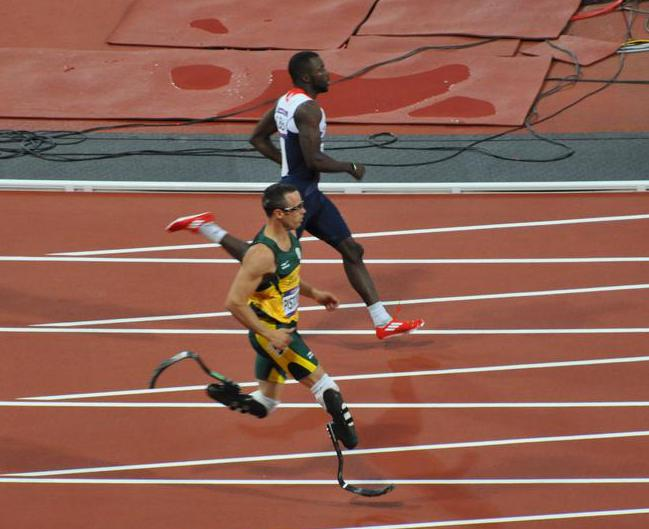
Oscar Pistorius becomes the first double leg amputee to compete at the Olympics.

Track & road events

Athlete	Event	Heat		Semifinal		Final	
Athlete	Event	Result	Rank	Result	Rank	Result	Rank
Lusapho April	Marathon	—N/a				2:19:00	43
Lehann Fourie	110 m hurdles	13.49	2 Q	13.28	3 q	13.53	7
Cornel Fredericks	400 m hurdles	52.29	8	Did not advance			
Anaso Jobodwana	200 m	20.46	2 Q	20.27	2 Q	20.69	8
Stephen Mokoka	Marathon	—N/a				2:19:52	49
Marc Mundell	50 km walk	—N/a				3:55:32 AF	32
Coolboy Ngamole	Marathon	—N/a				DNF	
André Olivier	800 m	1:46.42	3 Q	1:45.44	5	Did not advance	
Oscar Pistorius	400 m	45.44	2 Q	46.54	8	Did not advance	
Louis van Zyl	400 m hurdles	50.31	6	Did not advance			
Willem de Beer; Shaun de Jager; Ofentse Mogawane; Oscar Pistorius; Louis van Zyl	4 × 400 m relay	DNF*		—N/a		3:03.46 SB	7

* Allowed into final on appeal

Field events

Athlete	Event	Qualification		Final	
Athlete	Event	Distance	Position	Distance	Position
Godfrey Khotso Mokoena	Long jump	8.02	7 q	7.93	8

Combined events – Decathlon

Athlete	Event	100 m	LJ	SP	HJ	400 m	110H	DT	PV	JT	1500 m	Final	Rank
Willem Coertzen	Result	11.09	7.17	13.79	2.05	48.56	14.15	43.58	4.50	64.79	4:26.52	8173	9
Willem Coertzen	Points	841	854	715	850	882	955	738	760	810	768	8173	9

Women
Track & road events

Athlete	Event	Heat		Semifinal		Final	
Athlete	Event	Result	Rank	Result	Rank	Result	Rank
Rene Kalmer	Marathon	—N/a				2:30:51	35
Tanith Maxwell	Marathon	—N/a				2:40:27	81
Caster Semenya	800 m	2:00.71	2 Q	1:57.67 SB	1 Q	1:57.23	1st place, gold medalist(s)
Irvette van Blerk	Marathon	—N/a				DNF	

Field events

Athlete	Event	Qualification		Final	
Athlete	Event	Distance	Position	Distance	Position
Sunette Viljoen	Javelin throw	65.92	3 Q	64.53	4

== Badminton ==
Athlete	Event	Group Stage				Elimination	Quarterfinal	Semifinal	Final / BM	
Athlete	Event	Opposition Score	Opposition Score	Opposition Score	Rank	Opposition Score	Opposition Score	Opposition Score	Opposition Score	Rank
Dorian James; Willem Viljoen	Men's doubles	Boe / Mogensen (DEN); L 6–21, 12–21	Chai B / Guo Zd (CHN); L 8–21, 13–21	Ivanov / Sozonov (RUS); L 13–21, 15–21	4	Did not advance				
Michelle Edwards; Annari Viljoen	Women's doubles	Choo / Veeran (AUS); L 9–21, 7–21	Ha J-e / Kim M-j (KOR); L 8–21, 7–21	Jauhari / Polii (INA); L 18–21, 10–21	2 Q	Sorokina / Vislova (RUS); L 9–21, 7–21	Did not advance			

== Boxing ==
South Africa has entered boxers for the following events

Men

Athlete	Event	Round of 32	Round of 16	Quarterfinals	Semifinals	Final	
Athlete	Event	Opposition Result	Opposition Result	Opposition Result	Opposition Result	Opposition Result	Rank
Ayabonga Sonjica	Bantamweight	Dalakliev (BUL); L 6–15	Did not advance				
Siphiwe Lusizi	Welterweight	Abdul-Karim (IRQ); W 17–13	Maestre (VEN); L 13–18	Did not advance			

== Canoeing ==
=== Sprint ===
South Africa has entered canoeists for the following events

Athlete	Event	Heats		Semifinals		Final	
Athlete	Event	Time	Rank	Time	Rank	Time	Rank
Bridgitte Hartley	Women's K-1 500 m	1:53.051	2 Q	1:51.286	1 FA	1:52.923	3rd place, bronze medalist(s)
Tiffany Kruger	Women's K-1 200 m	46.122	7	Did not advance			

Qualification Legend: FA = Qualify to final (medal); FB = Qualify to final B (non-medal)

== Cycling ==
South Africa has entered nine cyclists.

=== Road ===
Athlete	Event	Time	Rank
Daryl Impey	Men's road race	5:46:37	40
Robyn de Groot	Women's road race	OTL	
Ashleigh Moolman	Women's road race	3:35:56	16
Ashleigh Moolman	Women's time trial	42:23.57	24
Joanna van de Winkel	Women's road race	3:35:56	28

=== Track ===
Sprint

Athlete	Event	Qualification		Round 1	Repechage 1	Round 2	Repechage 2	Quarterfinals	Semifinals	Final	
Athlete	Event	Time Speed (km/h)	Rank	Opposition Time Speed (km/h)	Opposition Time Speed (km/h)	Opposition Time Speed (km/h)	Opposition Time Speed (km/h)	Opposition Time Speed (km/h)	Opposition Time Speed (km/h)	Opposition Time Speed (km/h)	Rank
Bernard Esterhuizen	Men's sprint	10.350; 69.565	15	Förstemann (GER); L	Mazquiarán (ESP); Zhang M (CHN); W 10.762; 66.902	Kenny (GBR); L	Förstemann (GER); Kelemen (CZE); L	Did not advance		9th place final Nakagawa (JPN); Kelemen (CZE); Canelón (VEN); L	11

=== Mountain biking ===
Athlete	Event	Time	Rank
Phillip Buys	Men's cross-country	1:40:11	35
Burry Stander	Men's cross-country	1:29:37	5
Candice Neethling	Women's cross-country	1:45:03	28

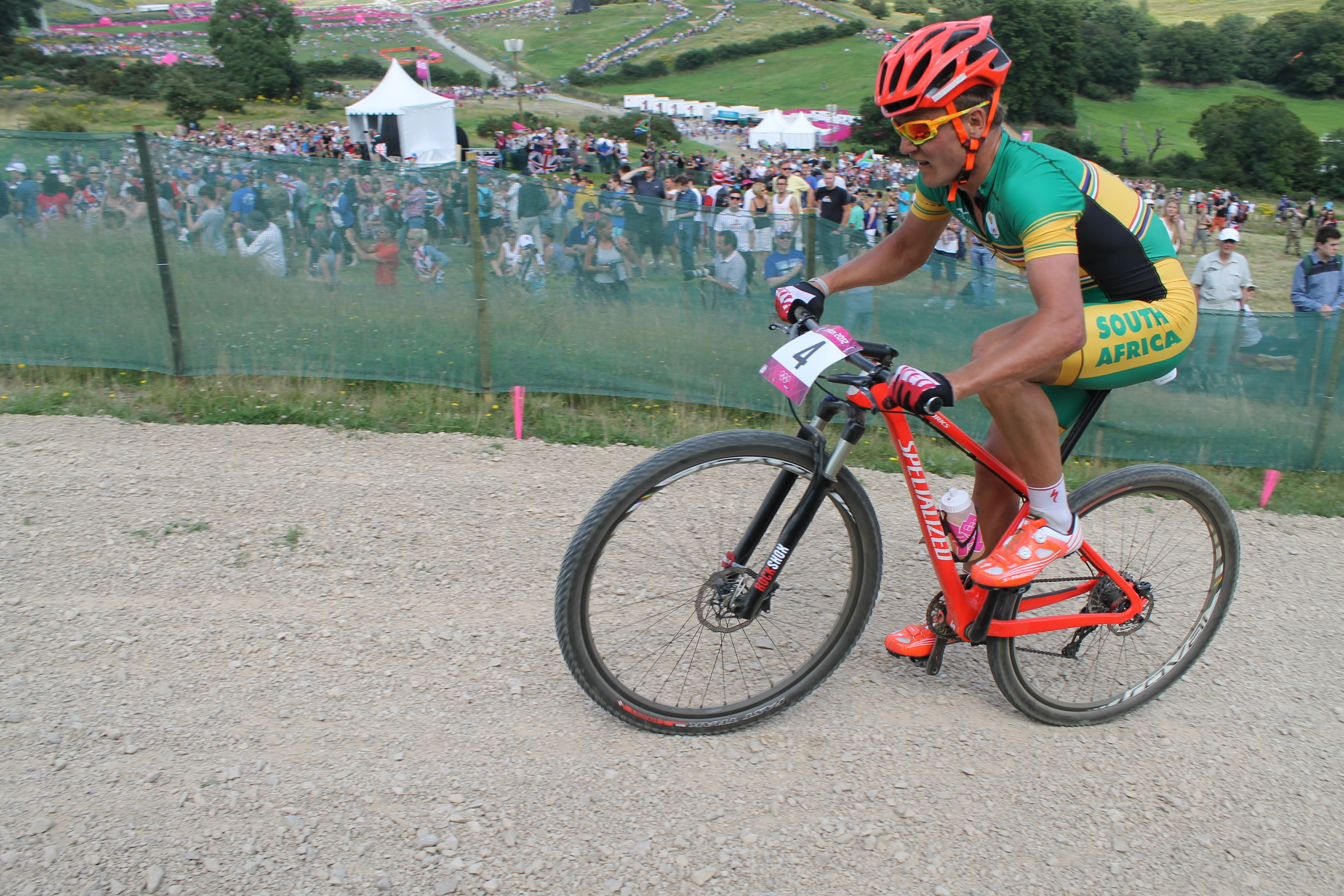
Burry Stander

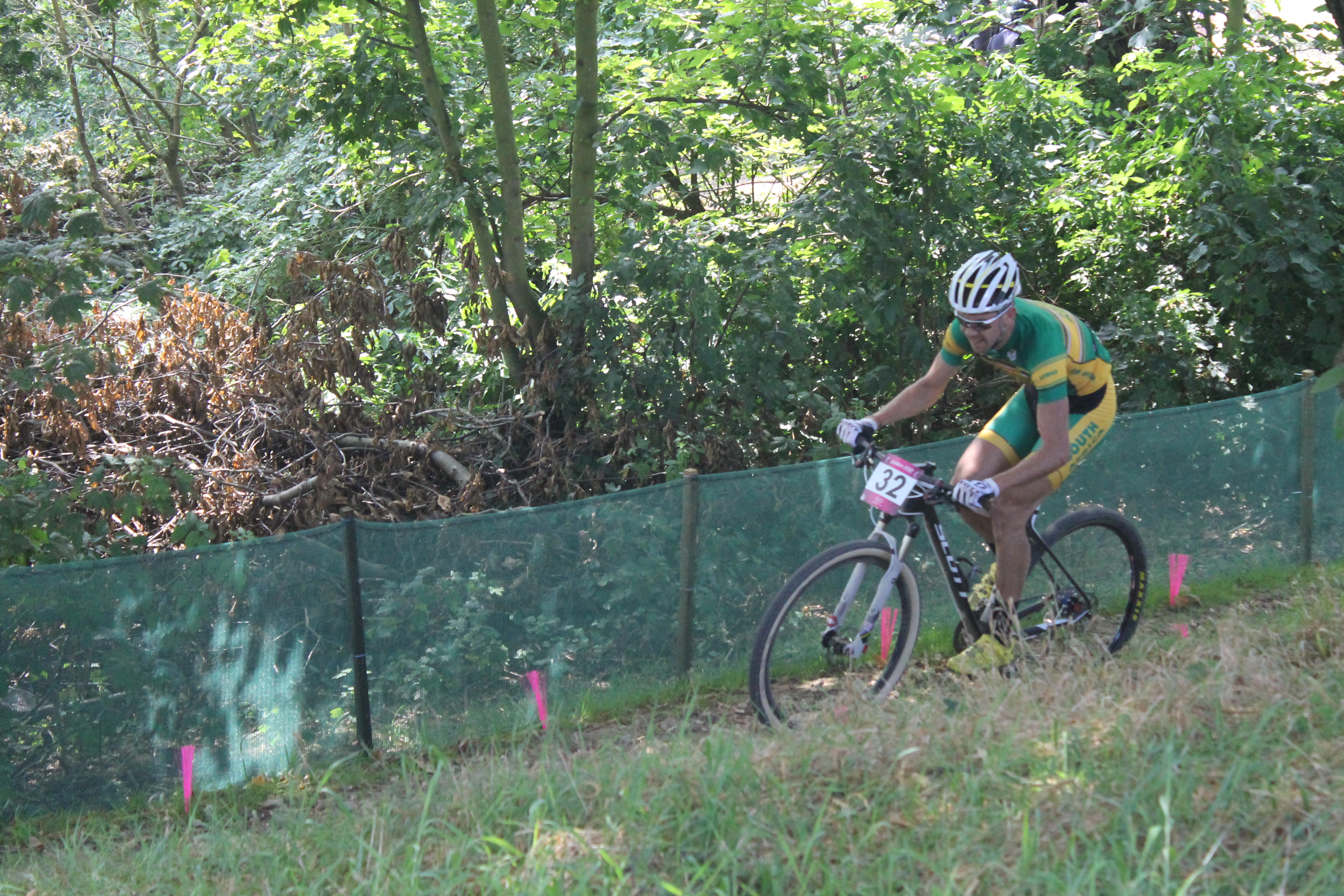
Philip Buys

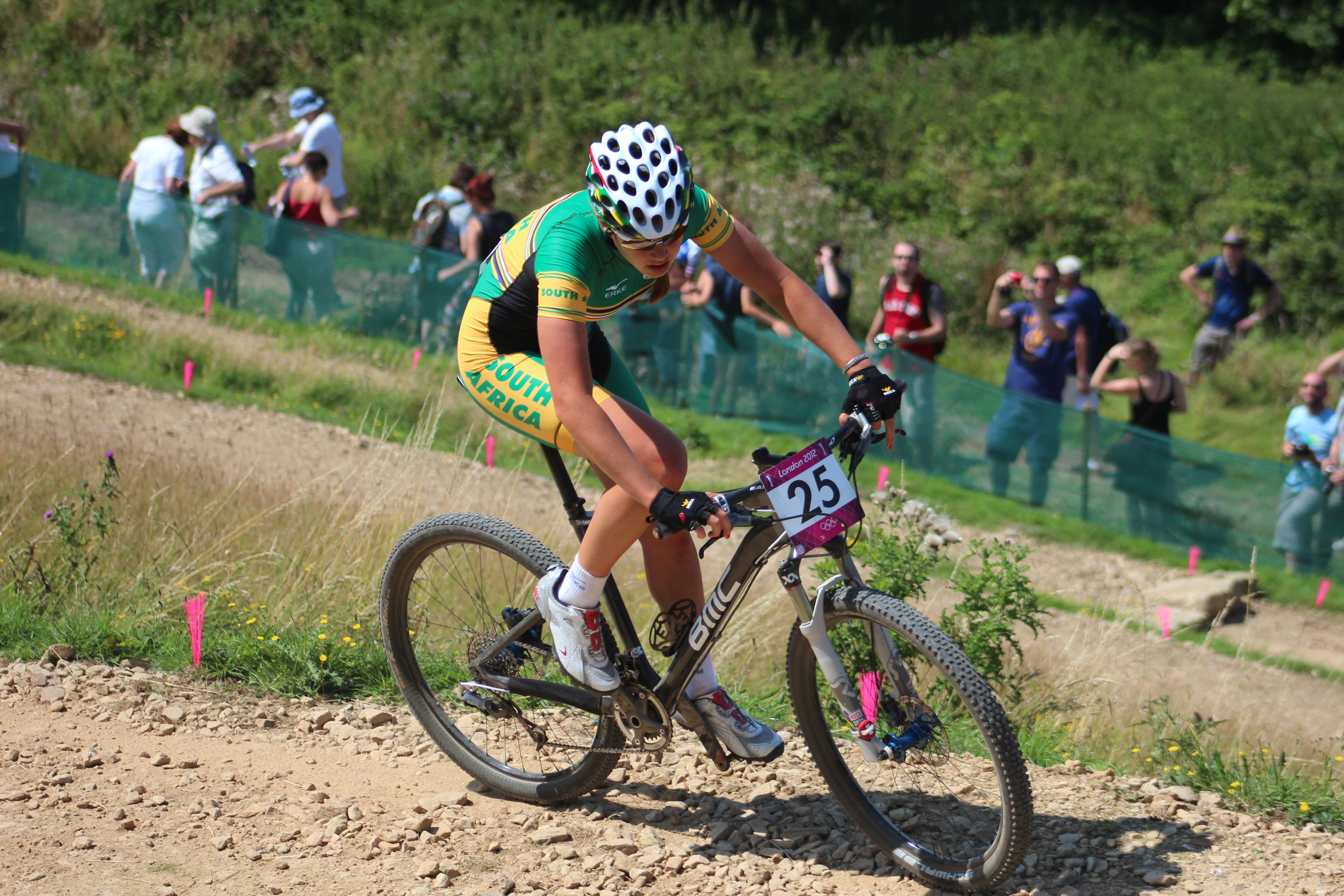
Candice Neethling

=== BMX ===
Athlete	Event	Seeding		Quarterfinal		Semifinal		Final	
Athlete	Event	Result	Rank	Points	Rank	Points	Rank	Result	Rank
Sifiso Nhlapo	Men's BMX	40.788	30	27	8	Did not advance			

== Equestrian ==
=== Eventing ===
Athlete	Horse	Event	Dressage		Cross-country			Jumping						Total	
Athlete	Horse	Event	Dressage		Cross-country			Qualifier			Final			Total	
Athlete	Horse	Event	Penalties	Rank	Penalties	Total	Rank	Penalties	Total	Rank	Penalties	Total	Rank	Penalties	Rank
Alexander Peternell	Asih	Individual	70.40	72	46.00	116.40	56	7.00	123.40	=27	Did not advance			123.40	49

== Field hockey ==
South Africa has qualified for both the men's and the women's event.

- Men's team event – 1 team of 16 players
- Women's team event – 1 team of 16 players

=== Men's tournament ===
Roster

The following is the South African roster in the men's field hockey tournament of the 2012 Summer Olympics.

Head Coach: Gregg Clark

1. Jonathan Robinson
2. Wade Paton
3. Andrew Cronje
4. Lloyd Madsen
5. Austin Smith (C)
7. Timothy Drummond
8. Marvin Harper
9. Julian Hykes
10. Lloyd Norris-Jones
11. Lance Louw
14. Rhett Halkett
18. Thornton McDade
23. Erasmus Pieterse (GK)
25. Justin Reid-Ross
29. Ian Haley
30. Taine Paton
31. Clinton Panther

Reserves:

- Jacques Le Roux (GK)

Group play

Pos	Team	Pld	W	D	L	GF	GA	GD	Pts	Qualification
1	Australia	5	3	2	0	23	5	+18	11	Semi-finals
2	Great Britain (H)	5	2	3	0	14	8	+6	9	Semi-finals
3	Spain	5	2	2	1	8	10	−2	8	Fifth place game
4	Pakistan	5	2	1	2	9	16	−7	7	Seventh place game
5	Argentina	5	1	1	3	10	14	−4	4	Ninth place game
6	South Africa	5	0	1	4	11	22	−11	1	Eleventh place game

Source: FIH
(H) Hosts

30 July 2012
10:45

Australia	6–0	South Africa
Dywer 16', 48', 58'; Butturini 33'; Ciriello 46'; Turner 62'	Report

Umpires:
Roel van Eert (NED)
Marcin Grochal (POL)

1 August 2012
16:00

South Africa	2–2	Great Britain
Smith 60'; Robinson 64'	Report	Jackson 14', 68'

Umpires:
Nigel Iggo (NZL)
Roel van Eert (NED)

3 August 2012
19:00

South Africa	2–3	Spain
Reid-Ross 26'; Norris-Jones 63'	Report	Salles 30'; Quemada 42'; Delas 55'

Umpires:
German Montes de Oca (ARG)
Tim Pullman (AUS)

5 August 2012
10:45

Pakistan	5–4	South Africa
Khan 20', 26'; Rasool 23'; Abbas 64'; Ahmed 67'	Report	McDade 2'; Reid-Ross 22', 35'; Paton 48'

Umpires:
Marcelo Servetto (ESP)
Colin Hutchinson (IRL)

7 August 2012
13:45

Argentina	6–3	South Africa
Peillat 25', 39', 65'; Rossi 33'; Callioni 45', 50'	Report	Reid-Ross 7'; Norris-Jones 8'; Robinson 64'

Umpires:
Raghu Prasad (IND)
Nathan Stagno (GIB)

11th/12th place

11 August 2012
08:30

South Africa	3–2	India
Cronje 8'; Drummond 34'; Norris-Jones 65'	Report	San. Singh 14'; D. Singh 67'

Umpires:
Kim Hong-lae (KOR)
German Montes de Oca (ARG)

=== Women's tournament ===
Roster

The following is the South Africa roster in the women's field hockey tournament of the 2012 Summer Olympics.

Head Coach: Giles Bonnet

1. Mariette Rix (GK)
3. Kate Woods
7. Illse Davids
8. Marsha Marescia (C)
10. Shelley Russell
12. Dirkie Chamberlain
13. Lisa-Marie Deetlefs
15. Pietie Coetzee
16. Jennifer Wilson
17. Lesle-Ann George
20. Nicolene Terblanche
21. Lenise Marais
22. Kathleen Taylor
23. Bernadette Coston
29. Tarryn Bright
30. Sulette Damons

Reserves:

- Vuyisanani Mangisa (GK)
- Lauren Penny

Group play

Pos	Team	Pld	W	D	L	GF	GA	GD	Pts	Qualification
1	Argentina	5	3	1	1	12	4	+8	10	Semi-finals
2	New Zealand	5	3	1	1	9	5	+4	10	Semi-finals
3	Australia	5	3	1	1	5	2	+3	10	
4	Germany	5	2	1	2	6	7	−1	7	
5	South Africa	5	1	0	4	9	14	−5	3	
6	United States	5	1	0	4	4	13	−9	3	

Source: FIH
Rules for classification: 1) Points; 2) Matches won; 3) Goal difference; 4) Goals for; 5) Head-to-head result.

29 July 2012
16:00

Argentina	7–1	South Africa
Aymar 8', 29'; J. Sruoga 20'; Cavallero 25'; Rebecchi 31'; Barrionuevo 62'; D'Elía 68'	Report	Chamberlain 23'

Umpires:
Miao Lin (CHN)
Lisa Roach (AUS)

31 July 2012
10:45

South Africa	1–4	New Zealand
Coetzee 52'	Report	C. Harrison 2'; Eshuis 22'; Sharland 29', 61'

Umpires:
Chieko Soma (JPN)
Amy Hassick (USA)

2 August 2012
16:00

South Africa	0–2	Germany
	Report	Mavers 25'; Rinne 44'

Umpires:
Elena Eskina (RUS)
Kang Hyun-young (KOR)

4 August 2012
08:30

Australia	1–0	South Africa
Close 8'	Report

Umpires:
Miao Lin (CHN)
Amy Hassick (USA)

6 August 2012
10:45

United States	0–7	South Africa
	Report	Bright 14', 44'; George 20'; Wilson 25'; Coetzee 33', 62'; Chamberlain 54'

Umpires:
Frances Block (GBR)
Claire Adenot (FRA)

9th/10th place

8 August 2012
08:30

Japan	2–1 (a.e.t.)	South Africa
Murakami 63', 80'	Report	Deetlefs 27'

Umpires:
Stella Bartlema (NED)
Amy Hassick (USA)

== Football ==
South Africa is qualified for the women's event.

- Women's team event – 1 team of 18 players

=== Women's tournament ===
Team roster

Head coach: Joseph Mkhonza

South Africa named a squad of 18 players and 4 alternates for the tournament.

No.	Pos.	Player	Date of birth (age)	Caps	Goals	Club
1	GK	Roxanne Barker	6 May 1991 (aged 21)	6	0	(United States Soccer Federation) Pepperdine Waves
2	MF	Robyn Moodaly	16 June 1994 (aged 18)	12	1	(South African Football Association) High Performance Centre
3	DF	Nothando Vilakazi	28 October 1988 (aged 23)	30	6	(South African Football Association) Palace Super Falcons
4	DF	Amanda Sister	1 March 1990 (aged 22)	33	1	(South African Football Association) Liverpool Eastern Cape
5	DF	Janine van Wyk	17 April 1987 (aged 25)	76	8	(South African Football Association) Palace Super Falcons
6	DF	Zamandosi Cele	26 December 1990 (aged 21)	18	0	(South African Football Association) Durban Ladies
7	MF	Leandra Smeda	22 July 1989 (aged 23)	19	3	(South African Football Association) Cape Town Roses
8	MF	Kylie Louw	15 January 1989 (aged 23)	72	7	(United States Soccer Federation) Stephen F. Austin Ladyjacks
9	MF	Amanda Dlamini (captain)	22 July 1988 (aged 24)	49	16	(South African Football Association) University of Johannesburg
10	MF	Marry Ntsweng	19 December 1989 (aged 22)	41	1	(South African Football Association) Tshwane University
11	FW	Noko Matlou	30 September 1985 (aged 26)	74	55	(South African Football Association) University of Johannesburg
12	FW	Portia Modise	20 June 1983 (aged 29)	92	71	(South African Football Association) Palace Super Falcons
13	MF	Gabisile Hlumbane	20 December 1986 (aged 25)	33	0	(South African Football Association) University of the Free State
14	FW	Sanah Mollo	30 January 1987 (aged 25)	26	8	(South African Football Association) Bloemfontein Celtic Ladies
15	DF	Refiloe Jane	4 August 1992 (aged 19)	5	0	(South African Football Association) Mamelodi Sundowns Ladies
16	MF	Mpumi Nyandeni	19 August 1987 (aged 24)	93	7	(Russian Football Union) WFC Rossiyanka
17	FW	Andisiwe Mgcoyi	3 July 1988 (aged 24)	21	4	(South African Football Association) Mamelodi Sundowns Ladies
18	GK	Thokozile Mndaweni	8 August 1981 (aged 30)	57	1	(South African Football Association) University of Johannesburg

Group play

Pos	Team	Pld	W	D	L	GF	GA	GD	Pts	Qualification
1	Sweden	3	1	2	0	6	3	+3	5	Qualified for the quarter-finals
2	Japan	3	1	2	0	2	1	+1	5	Qualified for the quarter-finals
3	Canada	3	1	1	1	6	4	+2	4	Qualified for the quarter-finals
4	South Africa	3	0	1	2	1	7	−6	1	

Source: IOC
25 July 2012
19:45

Sweden	4–1	South Africa
Fischer 7'; Dahlkvist 20'; Schelin 21', 63'	Report; Report	Modise 60'

City of Coventry Stadium, Coventry
Attendance: 18,290
Referee: Salomé di Iorio (Argentina)

28 July 2012
14:45

Canada	3–0	South Africa
Tancredi 7'; Sinclair 58', 86'	Report

City of Coventry Stadium, Coventry
Attendance: 14,753
Referee: Christina Pedersen (Norway)

31 July 2012
14:30

Japan	0–0	South Africa
	Report

Millennium Stadium, Cardiff
Attendance: 24,202
Referee: Efthalia Mitsi (Greece)

== Judo ==
Athlete	Event	Round of 64	Round of 32	Round of 16	Quarterfinals	Semifinals	Repechage	Final / BM	
Athlete	Event	Opposition Result	Opposition Result	Opposition Result	Opposition Result	Opposition Result	Opposition Result	Opposition Result	Rank
Gideon van Zyl	Men's −73 kg	Bye	Orujov (AZE); L 0101–0100	Did not advance					

== Rowing ==
South Africa has entered the following events.

Men

Athlete	Event	Heats		Repechage		Semifinals		Finals	
Athlete	Event	Time	Rank	Time	Rank	Time	Rank	Time	Rank
Matthew Brittain; Sizwe Ndlovu; John Smith; James Thompson	Lightweight four	5:54.62	2 SA/B	Bye		6:04.21	2 FA	6:02.84	1st place, gold medalist(s)

Women

Athlete	Event	Heats		Repechage		Finals	
Athlete	Event	Time	Rank	Time	Rank	Time	Rank
Lee-Ann Persse; Naydene Smith	Pair	7:14.31	4 R	7:18.96	5 FB	7:56.40	7

Qualification Legend: FA=Final A (medal); FB=Final B (non-medal); FC=Final C (non-medal); FD=Final D (non-medal); FE=Final E (non-medal); FF=Final F (non-medal); SA/B=Semifinals A/B; SC/D=Semifinals C/D; SE/F=Semifinals E/F; QF=Quarterfinals; R=Repechage

== Sailing ==
South Africa has entered one boat for the following event.

Men

Athlete	Event	Race											Net points	Final rank
Athlete	Event	1	2	3	4	5	6	7	8	9	10	M*	Net points	Final rank
Asenathi Jim; Roger Hudson	470	18	~~27~~	27	20	26	26	13	15	25	24	EL	194	26

M = Medal race; EL = Eliminated – did not advance into the medal race;

== Shooting ==
South Africa has entered one competitor in shooting;

Men

Athlete	Event	Qualification		Final	
Athlete	Event	Points	Rank	Points	Rank
Alistair Davis	Double trap	132	15	Did not advance	

== Swimming ==
Twenty South African swimmers have entered the following events:

Men

Athlete	Event	Heat		Semifinal		Final	
Athlete	Event	Time	Rank	Time	Rank	Time	Rank
Charl Crous	100 m backstroke	55.37	33	Did not advance			
Heerden Herman	400 m freestyle	3:57.28	25	—N/a		Did not advance	
Heerden Herman	1500 m freestyle	15:25.71	21	—N/a		Did not advance	
Chad le Clos	100 m butterfly	51.54	1 Q	51.42	2 Q	51.44	2nd place, silver medalist(s)
Chad le Clos	200 m butterfly	1:55.23	4 Q	1:54.34 AF	3 Q	1:52.96 AF	1st place, gold medalist(s)
Chad le Clos	200 m individual medley	1:59.45	11 Q	1:58.49	=7 Q	Withdrew	
Chad le Clos	400 m individual medley	4:12.24	2 Q	—N/a		4:12.42	5
Gideon Louw	50 m freestyle	22.12	11 Q	21.92	9	Did not advance	
Gideon Louw	100 m freestyle	48.29	2 Q	48.44	=9	Did not advance	
Graeme Moore	100 m freestyle	49.29	21	Did not advance			
Darren Murray	200 m backstroke	2:00.01	25	Did not advance			
Troyden Prinsloo	10 km open water	—N/a				1:50:52.9	12
Riaan Schoeman	400 m individual medley	4:17.22	19	—N/a		Did not advance	
Roland Mark Schoeman	50 m freestyle	21.92	5 Q	21.88	=7 Q	21.80	6
Darian Townsend	200 m individual medley	2:00.67	21	Did not advance			
Cameron van der Burgh	100 m breaststroke	59.79	6 Q	58.83 OR	1 Q	58.46 WR	1st place, gold medalist(s)
Gideon Louw; Graeme Moore; Roland Mark Schoeman; Darian Townsend	4 × 100 m freestyle relay	3:13.93	7 Q	—N/a		3:13.45	5
Jean Basson; Chad le Clos; Sebastien Rousseau; Darian Townsend	4 × 200 m freestyle relay	7:11.51	7 Q	—N/a		7:09.65	7
Charl Crous; Chad le Clos; Gideon Louw; Leith Shankland; Darian Townsend; Cameron van der Burgh	4 × 100 m medley relay	3:35.23	13	—N/a		Did not advance	

Women

Athlete	Event	Heat		Semifinal		Final	
Athlete	Event	Time	Rank	Time	Rank	Time	Rank
Trudi Maree	50 m freestyle	25.78	36	Did not advance			
Kathryn Meaklim	200 m individual medley	2:15.25	24	Did not advance			
Kathryn Meaklim	400 m individual medley	4:43.46	16	—N/a		Did not advance	
Karin Prinsloo	200 m freestyle	1:59.24	20	Did not advance			
Karin Prinsloo	200 m backstroke	2:10.34	13 Q	2:11.42	16	Did not advance	
Jessica Roux	10 km open water	—N/a				DNF	
Wendy Trott	400 m freestyle	4:11.63	22	—N/a		Did not advance	
Wendy Trott	800 m freestyle	8:28.98	12	—N/a		Did not advance	
Suzaan van Biljon	100 m breaststroke	1:07.54	12 Q	1:07.68	11	Did not advance	
Suzaan van Biljon	200 m breaststroke	2:25.94	9 Q	2:23.21 AF	5 Q	2:23.72	7

== Triathlon ==
South Africa has entered one man and two women.

Athlete	Event	Swim (1.5 km)	Trans 1	Bike (40 km)	Trans 2	Run (10 km)	Total Time	Rank
Richard Murray	Men's	18:11	0:35	59:38	0:26	30:25	1:49:15	17
Kate Roberts	Women's	19:23	0:40	1:07:21	0:34	34:48	2:02:46	22
Gillian Sanders	Women's	19:29	0:38	1:05:31	0:32	36:18	2:02:28	19

== Volleyball ==
=== Beach ===
Athlete	Event	Preliminary round	Standing	Round of 16	Quarterfinals	Semifinals	Final / BM	
Athlete	Event	Opposition Score	Standing	Opposition Score	Opposition Score	Opposition Score	Opposition Score	Rank
Freedom Chiya; Grant Goldschmidt	Men's	Pool D Gibb – Rosenthal (USA); L 0 – 2 (10–21, 11–21); Samoilovs – Sorokins (LAT); L 0 – 2 (13–21, 10–21); Fijałek – Prudel (POL); L 0 – 2 (19–21, 13–21)	4	Did not advance				19

== Weightlifting ==
South Africa has entered one weightlifter.

Athlete	Event	Snatch		Clean & Jerk		Total	Rank
Athlete	Event	Result	Rank	Result	Rank	Total	Rank
Jean Greeff	Men's −94 kg	137	20	176	20	313	20

== See also ==
- South Africa at the 2012 Summer Paralympics
- South Africa at the 2012 Winter Youth Olympics
