= Cycling at the 2012 Summer Olympics – Women's individual road race =

Women's cycling road race at the Games of the XXX Olympiad
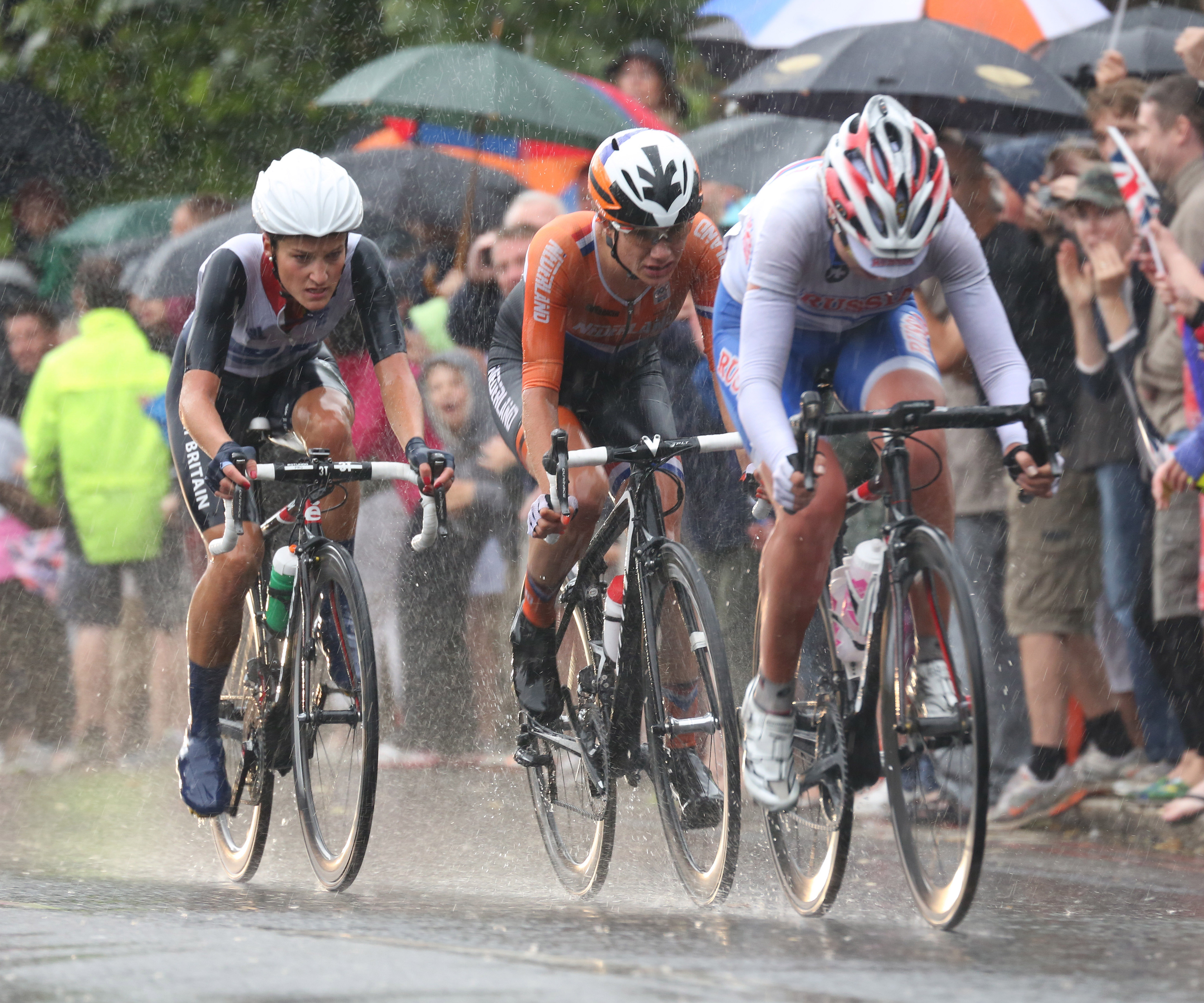
- The three medal winners in the closing stages of the race
- Venue: Central and southwest London and north Surrey; 140.3 kilometres (87.2 mi)
- Date: 29 July 2012
- Competitors: 66 from 36 nations
- Winning time: 3:35:29

Medalists
1st place, gold medalist(s)		Marianne Vos	Netherlands
2nd place, silver medalist(s)		Lizzie Armitstead	Great Britain
3rd place, bronze medalist(s)		Olga Zabelinskaya	Russia

The women's road race, one of the cycling events at the 2012 Olympic Games in London, took place on 29 July over a course starting and ending on The Mall and heading out of London into Surrey. Nicole Cooke of Great Britain was the defending champion.

In heavy rain, the race and gold medal was won by Marianne Vos of the Netherlands. Great Britain's Lizzie Armitstead was second, collecting silver, and Russia's rider Olga Zabelinskaya won the bronze in third place.

== Start list ==
The provisional start list of 67 riders was published on 23 July. The final start list of 66 riders was corrected by the removal of Lee Wai Sze of Hong Kong to leave Hong Kong with the one place they had obtained under the qualification system, and the German team decided to replace Claudia Häusler with Charlotte Becker.

== Race ==
The race started at 12:00 British Summer Time (UTC+01:00). The weather was cool and it was very rainy. At both the start and finish of the race it was pouring down with rain. Due to the bad weather, the race saw a lot of punctures and incidents which caused riders to lose valuable time.

After an unsuccessful attack from Janildes Silva Fernandes, Ellen van Dijk attacked after around 35 kilometres. A couple of other riders joined Van Dijk in her escape but the efforts were not successful, as the escapees were caught by the group. A few minutes later, Ellen van Dijk attacked again in an attempt to splinter the peloton but was soon reeled in again. After two short bursts from Ellen van Dijk and one from Loes Gunnewijk, the American Kristin Armstrong attacked on the climb of Box Hill, followed by Great Britain's Emma Pooley. When the bunch was back together, race favourite Marianne Vos attacked but was immediately followed by America's Shelley Olds and the bunch. After other attacks from Ellen van Dijk, Judith Arndt, Emma Pooley and Ellen van Dijk respectively, the bunch contained about 35 riders with 50 kilometers to go. At the beginning of the second of the two rounds of Box Hill, Marianne Vos attacked the bunch, joined by Lizzie Armitstead and the Belarus rider Alena Amialiusik but were unable to get away. After the descent of Box Hill there was a clear escape of Marianne Vos, Olga Zabelinskya, Lizzie Armitstead and Shelley Olds, who quickly made a gap of half a minute between themselves and the chasing posse. After a puncture of Shelley Olds the three remaining riders increased the distance between them and their pursuers to 48 seconds with 10 kilometres to go. After Zabelinskaya tried unsuccessful to escape with 2 kilometres to go, it was Vos who sprinted for the finish with about 200 metres to go. Armitstead tried to get after her but failed to do so and was beaten by a bike-length.

== Final classification ==
In the table below, "s.t." indicates that the rider crossed the finish line in the same group as the cyclist before her, and was therefore credited with the same finishing time.

Rank	Rider	Country	Time
Gold medal	Marianne Vos	Netherlands	3:35:29
Silver medal	Lizzie Armitstead	Great Britain	s.t.
Bronze medal	Olga Zabelinskaya	Russia	3:35:31
4	Ina-Yoko Teutenberg	Germany	3:35:56
5	Giorgia Bronzini	Italy	s.t.
6	Emma Johansson	Sweden	s.t.
7	Shelley Olds	United States	s.t.
8	Pauline Ferrand-Prévot	France	s.t.
9	Liesbet De Vocht	Belgium	s.t.
10	Aude Biannic	France	s.t.
11	Katarzyna Pawłowska	Poland	s.t.
12	Joëlle Numainville	Canada	s.t.
13	Na Ah-Reum	South Korea	s.t.
14	Annemiek van Vleuten	Netherlands	s.t.
15	Alena Amialiusik	Belarus	s.t.
16	Ashleigh Moolman	South Africa	s.t.
17	Grete Treier	Estonia	s.t.
18	Linda Villumsen	New Zealand	s.t.
19	Emilia Fahlin	Sweden	s.t.
20	Pia Sundstedt	Finland	s.t.
21	Christine Majerus	Luxembourg	
22	Polona Batagelj	Slovenia	s.t.
23	Clemilda Fernandes	Brazil	s.t.
24	Evelyn Stevens	United States	s.t.
25	Tatiana Antoshina	Russia	s.t.
26	Evelyn García	El Salvador	s.t.
27	Denise Ramsden	Canada	s.t.
28	Joanna van de Winkel	South Africa	s.t.
29	Maaike Polspoel	Belgium	3:36:01
30	Tatiana Guderzo	Italy	s.t.
31	Nicole Cooke	Great Britain	s.t.
32	Clara Hughes	Canada	s.t.
33	Trixi Worrack	Germany	3:36:04
34	Noemi Cantele	Italy	s.t.
35	Kristin Armstrong	United States	3:36:16
36	Amber Neben	United States	3:36:20
37	Judith Arndt	Germany	3:36:28
38	Larisa Pankova	Russia	3:37:22
39	Shara Gillow	Australia	s.t.
40	Emma Pooley	Great Britain	3:37:36
–	Íngrid Drexel	Mexico	OTL
–	Loes Gunnewijk	Netherlands	OTL
–	Charlotte Becker	Germany	OTL
–	Liu Xin	China	OTL
–	Monia Baccaille	Italy	OTL
–	Fernanda da Silva	Brazil	OTL
–	Ellen van Dijk	Netherlands	OTL
–	Lucy Martin	Great Britain	OTL
–	Hsiao Mei-yu	Chinese Taipei	OTL
–	Alyona Andruk	Ukraine	OTL
–	Audrey Cordon	France	OTL
–	Ludivine Henrion	Belgium	OTL
–	Robyn de Groot	South Africa	OTL
–	Amanda Spratt	Australia	OTL
–	Chloe Hosking	Australia	OTL
–	Yumari González	Cuba	OTL
–	Emilie Moberg	Norway	OTL
–	Isabelle Söderberg	Sweden	OTL
–	Jamie Wong	Hong Kong	OTL
–	Mayuko Hagiwara	Japan	DNF
–	Danielys García	Venezuela	DNF
–	Paola Muñoz	Chile	DNF
–	Aurelie Halbwachs	Mauritius	DNF
–	Elena Tchalykh	Azerbaijan	DNF
–	Jutatip Maneephan	Thailand	DNF
–	Janildes Fernandes	Brazil	DNF

Over time limit (OTL)
Under UCI regulations for one-day road races (article 2.3.039), "Any rider finishing in a time exceeding that of the winner by more than 5% shall not be placed". Applying this to the winning time of Marianne Vos resulted in a time limit of 3:46:15.

== Gallery ==
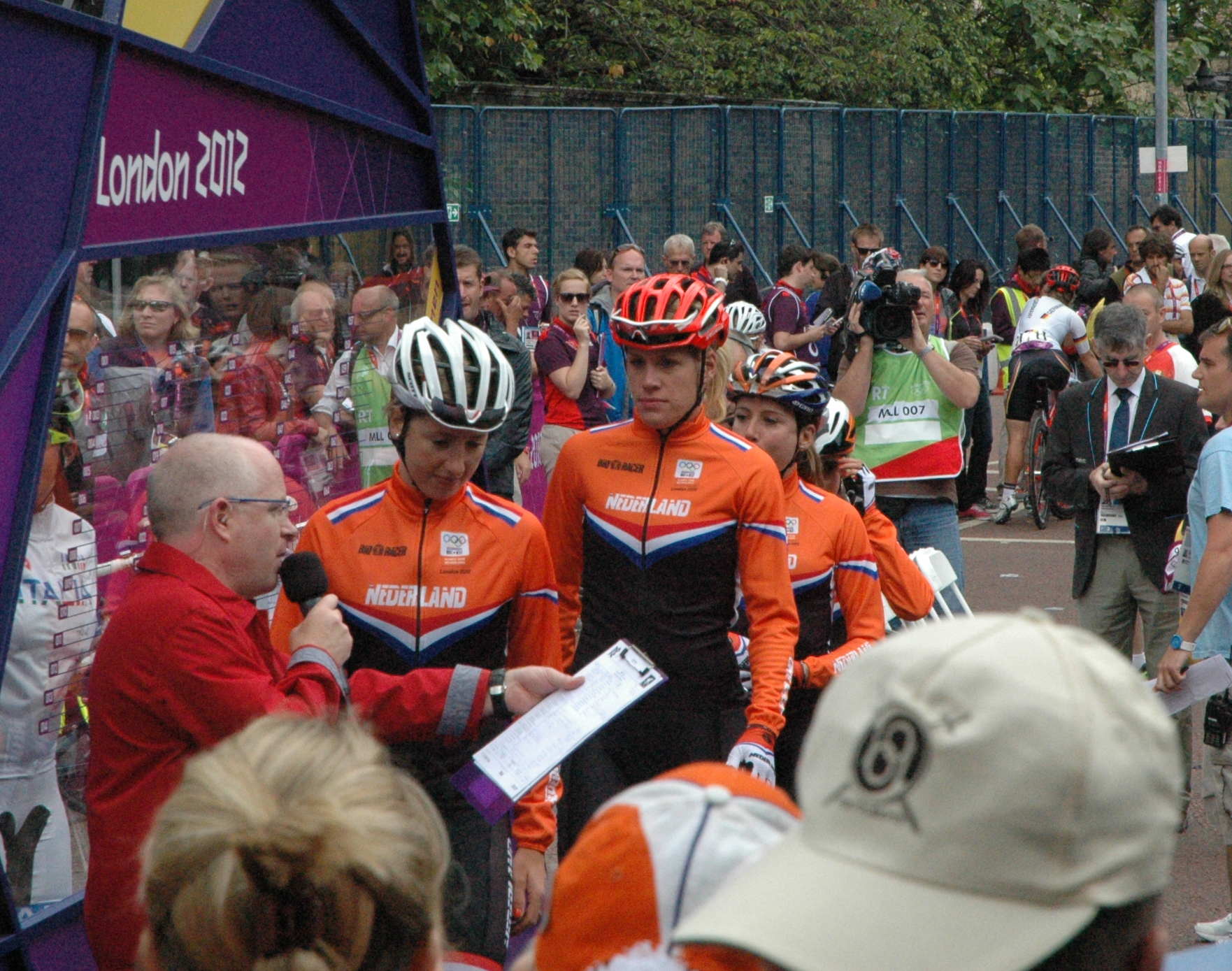
The Dutch Team (Loes Gunnewijk, Ellen van Dijk, Annemiek van Vleuten and Marianne Vos) before the race

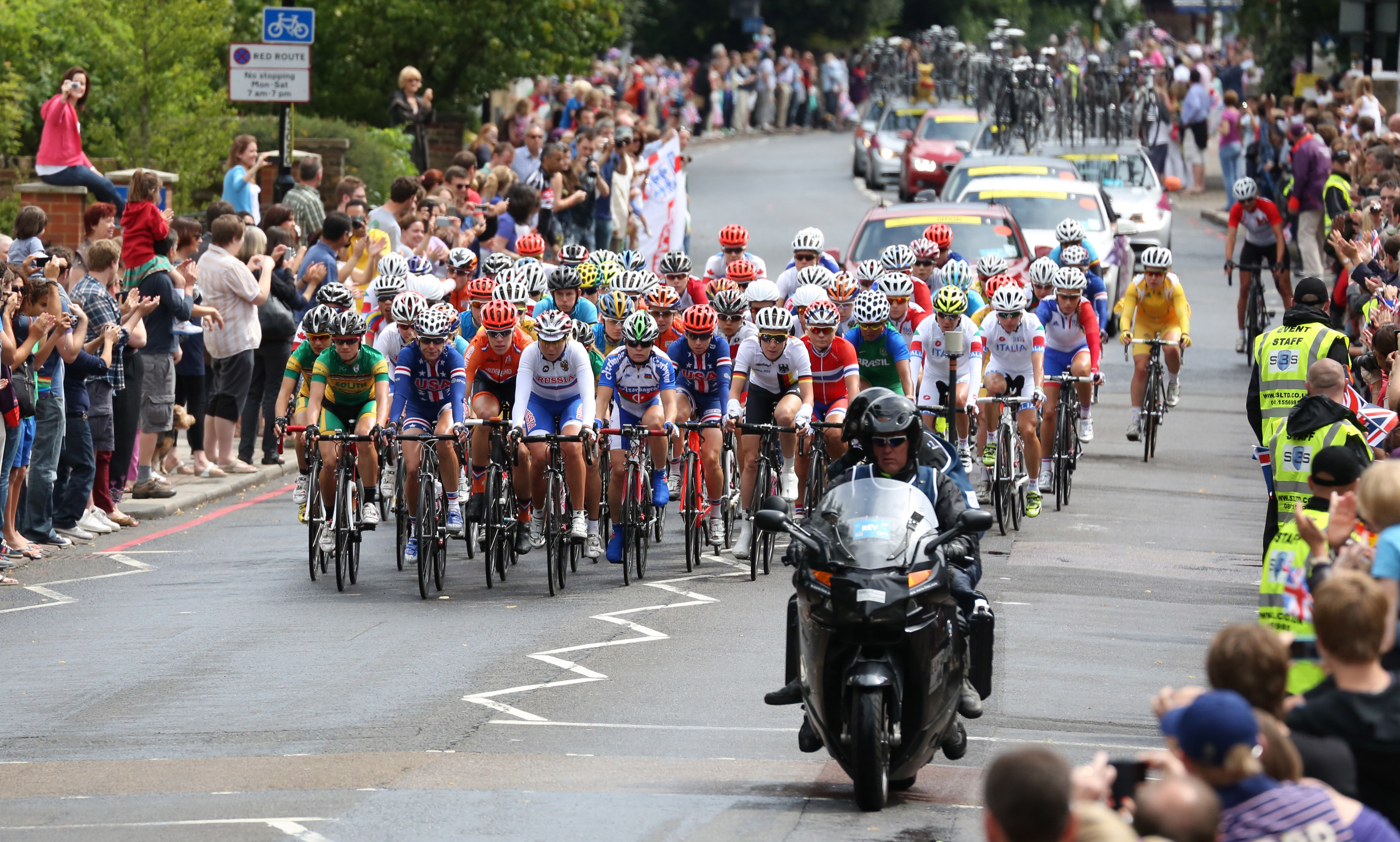
The peloton in southwest London, near the beginning of the women's road race

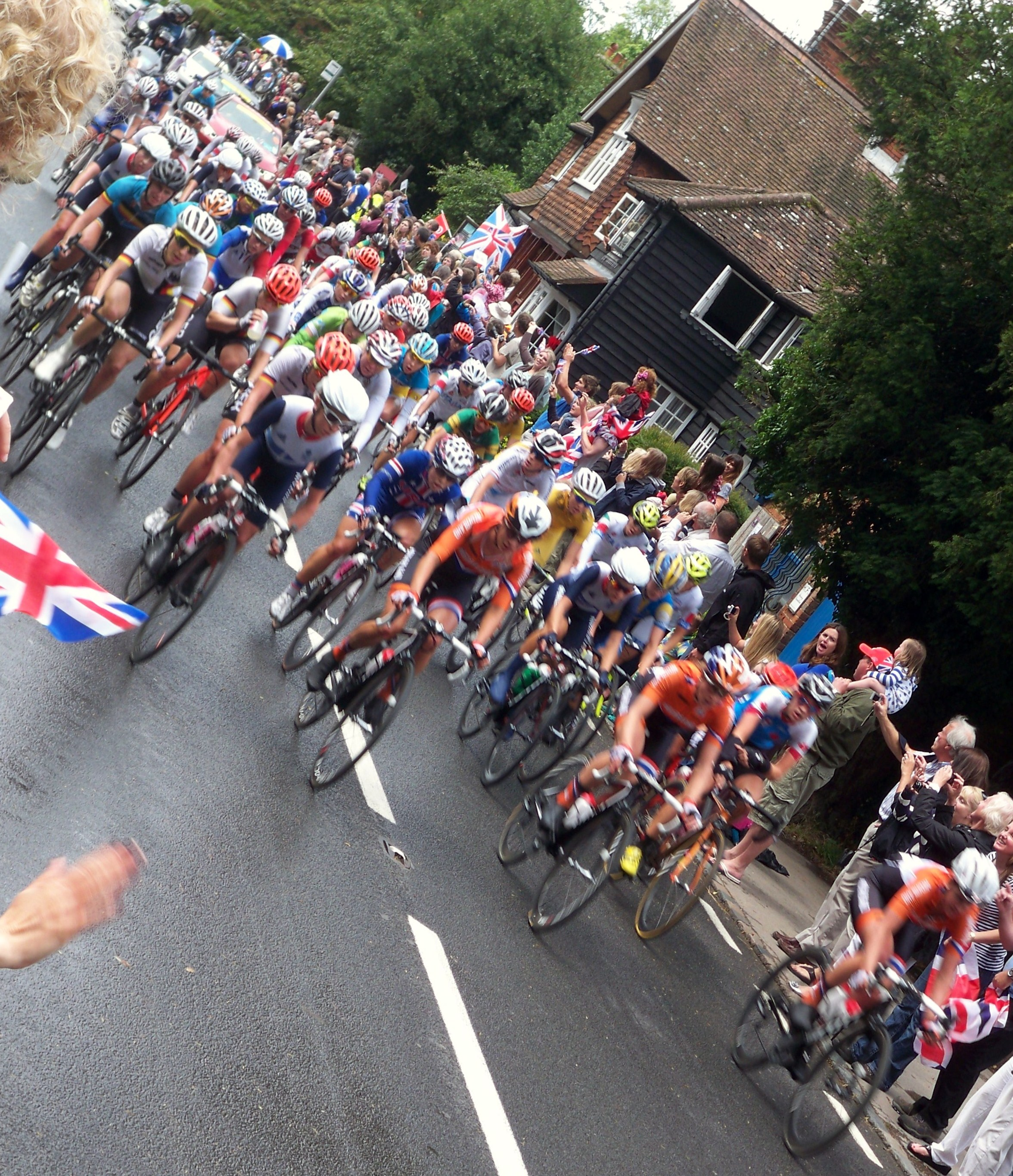
The peloton through Abinger Hammer
