= Lina Nilsson =

Swedish footballer

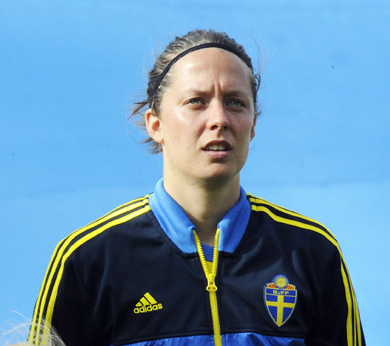
- Nilsson playing for the Swedish Women's National team in 2013

Personal information
- Full name: Lina Therese Nilsson
- Date of birth: 17 June 1987 (age 39)
- Place of birth: Ystad, Sweden
- Height: 1.70 m (5 ft 7 in)
- Position: Defender

Youth career
- IFK Ystad
- IK Pandora

Senior career*
Years	Team	Apps	(Gls)
2002–2006	Sjöbo IF		
2006–2017	Malmö (Note: Swedish Football Association source includes 2008 and subsequent seasons only. It does not include figures for the 2006 or 2007 Damallsvenskan seasons.)	160	(8)

International career^{‡}
2008–2016	Sweden	72	(3)
Medal record
Women's football
Representing Sweden
FIFA Women's World Cup
Bronze medal – third place	2011 Germany	Team
- * Club domestic league appearances and goals as of 16:43, 4 October 2015 (UTC) ‡ National team caps and goals as of 16:43, 4 October 2015 (UTC)

Lina Therese Nilsson (born 17 June 1987) is a Swedish retired footballer who played for FC Rosengård and the Sweden national team. Normally a full-back, she can also play as a wide midfielder. She joined Malmö FF Dam in 2006 and has remained with the club through its different guises as LdB FC and FC Rosengård. Since winning her first Sweden cap in July 2009, Nilsson has represented her country in the 2009 and 2013 editions of the UEFA Women's Championship, as well as the 2011 and 2015 FIFA Women's World Cups. She also played at the 2012 Olympic football tournament.

On 5 October 2017, she announced her retirement from her playing career.

== Club career ==
Nilsson began her career with smaller teams in her native Skåne County, before she arrived at local Damallsvenskan club Malmö FF Dam in 2006. She had already been training once a week with Malmö while playing for Sjöbo IF in the lower leagues.

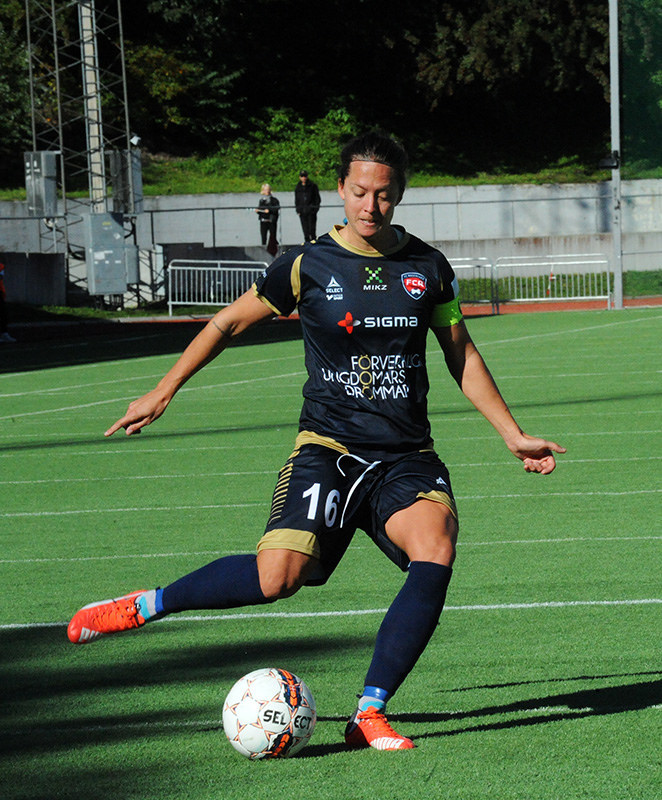
Playing for FC Rosengård in September 2015

Consistent right-back Nilsson was one of four players to collect winner's medals from each of the club's championship wins in 2010, 2011, 2013 and 2014. In August 2015, team captain Lina Nilsson signed a two-year contract extension with the club, now known as FC Rosengård.

== International career ==
As a member of the Sweden under-19 team, Nilsson played in three matches at the 2006 UEFA Women's Under-19 Championship in Switzerland. She made her senior debut in July 2009, as a 55th-minute substitute for Anna Paulson in a 2–0 friendly win over China at Stadsparksvallen, Jönköping. She almost marked her debut with a goal, but her shot hit the crossbar.

National coach Thomas Dennerby selected Nilsson for UEFA Women's Euro 2009, where she appeared in three matches. She retained her squad place for the 2011 FIFA Women's World Cup in Germany, but Annica Svensson was installed as the first-choice right-back. Nilsson did not feature until the quarter-final, where she was a late substitute in Sweden's 3–1 win over Australia.

Sweden's third-place finish at the World Cup ensured qualification for the 2012 London Olympics. Nilsson started two of Sweden's Group F games and was a substitute in the other one. Her two yellow cards meant she was suspended for the quarter-final and Annica Svensson played in the 2–1 defeat by France at Hampden Park in Glasgow.

Incoming national coach Pia Sundhage retained Nilsson and selected her in the squad for UEFA Women's Euro 2013, which Sweden hosted. After recovering from a foot injury, Nilsson played in two of Sweden's three Group A matches. Sundhage selected youngster Jessica Samuelsson at right-back for the knockout matches against Iceland and Germany.

In April 2014, Nilsson scored her first international goal, on the occasion of her 50th cap. It came in Sweden's 4–0 World Cup qualifying win over Northern Ireland at Shamrock Park in Portadown. She added further goals in the return match with Northern Ireland and against Bosnia and Herzegovina.

Ahead of the 2015 FIFA Women's World Cup, Sundhage experimented with Nilsson in an unfamiliar left-back role. The move was designed to accommodate converted forward Elin Rubensson at right-back. Nilsson adapted quickly to her new role, although her momentary "blackout" cost the team a goal in a 2–1 pre-tournament friendly defeat by the Netherlands.

Nilsson started Sweden's opening World Cup match at left-back, but struggled to contain Nigeria's winger Asisat Oshoala. Sweden surrendered a two-goal lead to draw 3–3. In Sweden's next match an improved performance secured a 0–0 draw with the United States, with Nilsson pushed into a left-sided midfield role. In Sweden's 4–1 defeat by Germany in the second round, Nilsson replaced beleaguered left-back Samuelsson at half-time.

=== International goals ===
Scores and results list Sweden's goal tally first.

Goal	Date	Venue	Opponent	Score	Result	Competition
1.	5 April 2014	Shamrock Park, Portadown, Northern Ireland	Northern Ireland	4–0	4–0	World Cup 2015 qualification
2.	8 May 2014	Myresjöhus Arena, Växjö, Sweden	Northern Ireland	3–0	3–0	World Cup 2015 qualification
3.	13 September 2014	Gamla Ullevi, Gothenburg, Sweden	Bosnia and Herzegovina	1–0	3–0	World Cup 2015 qualification

== Playing style ==
While naming his national team in 2009, coach Thomas Dennerby said of newly included Nilsson: "Lina is an attacking full-back who dares to go forward without neglecting her defensive duties." A Sveriges Radio preview of UEFA Women's Euro 2013 described Nilsson as more attacking and technical than her right-back rival Jessica Samuelsson, who was said to be more solid defensively. When handing Nilsson the FC Rosengård captaincy in 2015, coach Markus Tilly praised her on-pitch communication skills.

== Honours ==
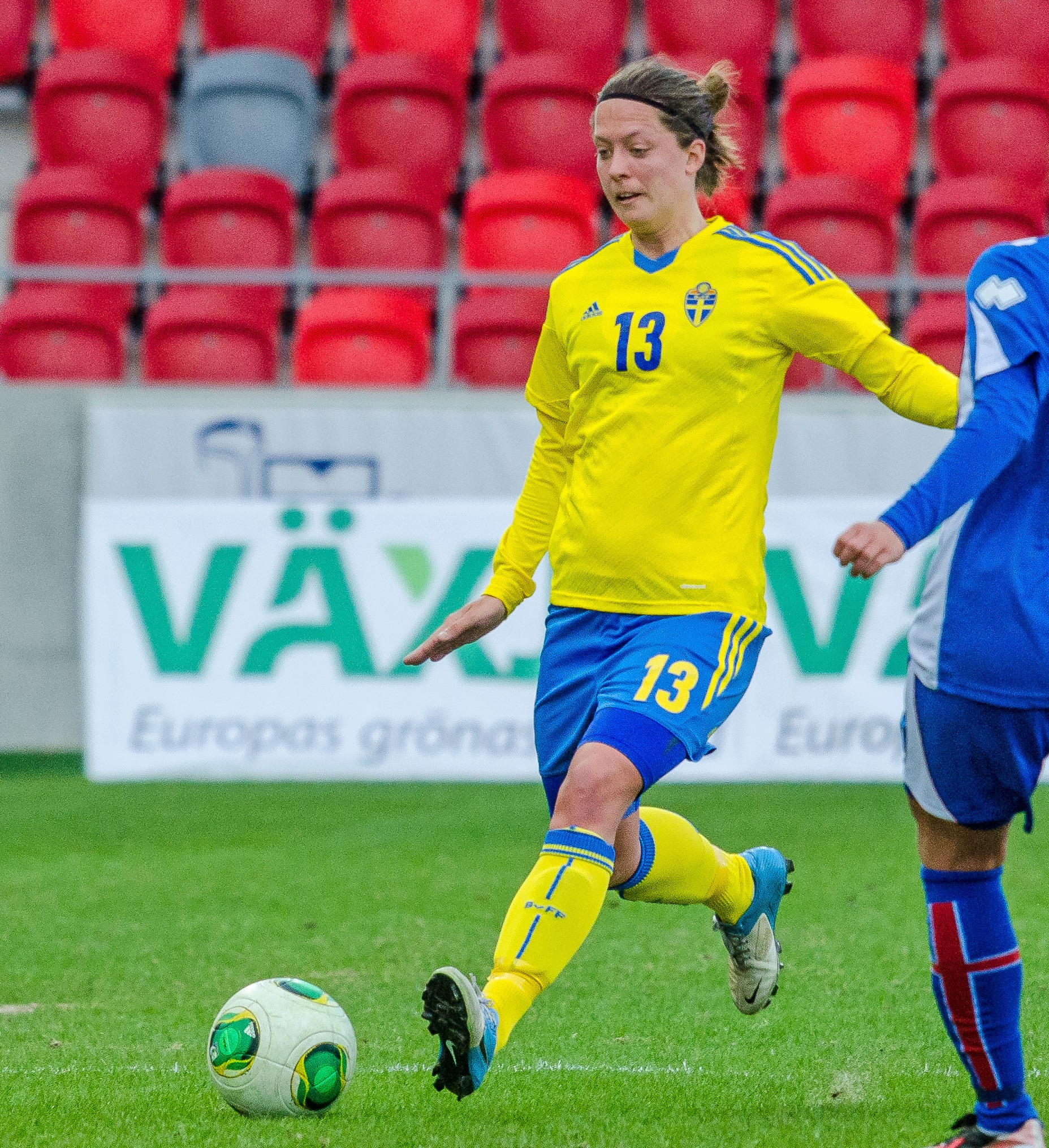
Playing for Sweden in 2013

=== Club ===
LdB FC Malmö / Rosengård

- Damallsvenskan (4): 2010, 2011, 2013, 2014
- Svenska Supercupen (3): 2011, 2012, 2015

=== International ===
Sweden

- FIFA Women's World Cup Third place: 2011
