= Siphiwe Mkhonza =

South African soccer player (1979–2024)

Personal information
- Full name: Siphiwe Ignatius Mkhonza
- Date of birth: 2 January 1979
- Place of birth: Springs, South Africa
- Date of death: 5 March 2024 (aged 45)
- Height: 1.81 m (5 ft 11 in)
- Position: Centre-back

Senior career*
Years	Team	Apps	(Gls)
1999–2001	Bloemfontein Celtic	61	(1)
2001–2002	Ria Stars	30	(0)
2002–2004	Lamontville Golden Arrows	59	(0)
2004–2007	Kaizer Chiefs	44	(0)
2007–2008	SuperSport United	6	(0)
2008–2009	Maritzburg United	17	(0)
2009–2011	AmaZulu	10	(0)
2011–2012	Black Leopards	3	(0)
Total		220	(1)

International career
2002–2006	South Africa	7	(0)
- * Club domestic league appearances and goals

Siphiwe Ignatius Mkhonza (2 January 1979 – 5 March 2024) was a South African soccer player who played as a centre-back. He played club football for Bloemfontein Celtic, Ria Stars, Lamontville Golden Arrows, Kaizer Chiefs, SuperSport United, Maritzburg United, AmaZulu and Black Leopards and won seven caps for the South Africa national team.

== Early life ==
Mkhonza was born in Kwa-Thema, Springs, Transvaal (now Gauteng) to his parents Mavis Motsile and Joseph Mkhonza. His father, Joseph Mkhonza, was the onetime head coach of the South Africa women's national soccer team and coached the team at the 2012 Summer Olympics. Siphiwe attended Thulisa Primary School and would go on to attend Kenneth Masekela Secondary School.

Mkhonza played for several clubs as a youth starting his playing days at Skheshes Babes, and then going on to play for Tip Top FC, Lusitano FC, Munich FC and Katlehong City. These pivotal days would prove vital as he was able to adapt to many situations in his playing days.

== Club career ==
=== Bloemfontein Celtic ===
Mkhonza's began his professional football career at Bloemfontein Celtic in 1999 and stayed there until 2001. He would also captain his team at the age of 18 years old in his first season. In the 1999–2000 Premier Soccer League season, Mkhonza would lead his team to the biggest home win of the season, beating Mother City 6–0.

=== Ria Stars ===
Joining next the Pietersburg based club, Ria Stars, who were promoted in the previous season, Mkhonza would prove that his leadership qualities were acknowledged as he would captain the team in the 2001-2002 campaign and make 30 appearances.

=== Golden Arrows ===
After a lacklustre season with new boys, Ria Stars, Mkhonza was keen on proving his value as he moved to Durban-based club, Lamontville Golden Arrows He would spend two seasons here, with him bringing the team from 13th position on the log in the previous season to 5th on the log in his first season with the club, also going on to captain them. Mkhonza played all but one game in his two seasons.

=== Kaizer Chiefs ===
Mkhonza played successfully for Soweto giants Kaizer Chiefs from 2004 to 2007. In his first season he won his first league title in the 2004–05 Premier Soccer League campaign. His move to the Glamour Boys would see Mkhonza receive his first South Africa national team call up and game.

=== Maritzburg United ===
Mkhonza moved to a struggling Maritzburg United with the intention of reviving the club. He also captained the Team of Choice and saved them from relegation. Mkhonza would only stay for one season at the Pietermaritzburg outfit before moving on.

=== AmaZulu ===
Choosing to stay in KwaZulu-Natal, Mkhonza then had a fruitful stint at AmaZulu. While playing in a more senior role for the Durban-based outfit, he would help them to a Nedbank Cup final (losing 3–0 to Bidvest Wits) and get the club into the top 8 for the first time.

== Death ==
Mkhonza died on 5 March 2024, at the age of 45 from kidney infection.
