= Cycling at the 2012 Summer Olympics – Qualification =

== Summary ==
Following publication of full track cycling quotas - 25 April 2012.

Although in theory an NOC is entitled to qualify up to one place per track event for a total of eighteen quota places, a limit of 14 riders (8 men, 6 women ) is placed on each NOC, with the possibility of drafting in two further riders from other cycling events. For certain countries, therefore, the number of quota places won will significantly exceed the numbers of riders qualified.

Similarly, the cyclists who compete in the road time trial must also compete in the road race event; thus an NOC may win 2 quota places, but be allowed to take only one rider.

Nation	Track										Road				MTB		BMX		Total	
Nation	Men					Women					Men		Women		M	W	M	W	Q	R
Nation	TS	KE	SP	TP	OM	TS	KE	SP	TP	OM	RR	TT	RR	TT	M	W	M	W	Q	R
Algeria											1								1	1
Argentina					X						1	1			1		1		5	4
Australia	X	X	X	X	X	X	X	X	X	X	5	2	3	1	1	1	3	2	36	29
Austria											2				2	1			5	5
Azerbaijan													1	1					2	1
Belarus							X	X	X	X	3	1	1						11	10
Belgium				X	X					X	5	1	3	1	2		1		19	17
Brazil											3	1	3	1	1		1	1	11	9
Bulgaria											2								2	2
Canada		X			X		X	X	X	X	1	1	3	2	2	2	1		20	17
Chile					X						1		1						3	3
China	X	X	X			X	X	X	X	X			1		1	1			16	12
Colombia		X		X	X	X	X	X		X	3	1			1	1	2	1	20	17
Costa Rica											1				1				2	2
Croatia											2								2	2
Cuba							X	X		X	1		1						5	5
Cyprus															1				1	1
Czech Republic		X	X								2				3	1		2	10	10
Denmark				X	X						4	2				1	1		13	11
Ecuador											1						1		2	2
Eritrea											1								1	1
El Salvador													1						1	1
Estonia											1		1						2	2
Finland											1		1	1					3	2
France	X	X	X		X	X	X	X		X	4	1	3	1	3	2	3	2	30	24
Georgia											1								1	1
Germany	X	X	X		X	X	X	X	X		5	2	4	2	3	2	2		33	25
Great Britain	X	X	X	X	X	X	X	X	X	X	5	2	4	2	1	1	1	1	35	27
Greece		X	X								1				1				4	4
Guam															1				1	1
Guatemala											1								1	1
Hong Kong					X		X	X			1		1		1				6	6
Hungary											1				1	1			3	3
Iran											3	1							4	3
Ireland					X						3	1							5	4
Italy					X						5	1	4	2	2	1	1		17	14
Japan	X	X	X					X			2	1	1		1	1			12	9
Kazakhstan											2	2							4	2
Latvia											1						3	1	5	5
Lithuania							X	X			2	1						1	6	4
Luxembourg											1	1	1						3	2
Malaysia		X	X				X				2								5	5
Morocco											3	1							4	3
Mauritius													1						1	1
Mexico											1		1						2	2
Moldova											1								1	1
Namibia											1				1				2	2
Netherlands		X	X	X		X	X	X	X	X	5	2	4	2	2		3	1	33	25
New Zealand	X	X	X	X	X		X	X	X	X	2	1	1	1	1	1	2	1	26	22
Norway											4	1	1			1			7	6
Philippines																	1		1	1
Poland	X	X	X							X	3	1	1		2	2			15	12
Portugal											3	1			1				5	4
Romania											1								1	1
Russia	X	X	X	X			X	X		X	3	1	3	2	1	1			23	18
Rwanda															1				1	1
Serbia											2								2	2
Slovakia											1								1	1
Slovenia											3	1	1			2			7	6
South Africa			X								1		3	1	2	1	1		10	9
South Korea				X	X	X	X	X		X	1		1						12	10
Spain		X	X	X	X					X	5	2			3				18	16
Sweden											1	1	3	2		1			8	5
Switzerland											5	2			3	2	1		13	11
Syria											1								1	1
Thailand													1						1	1
Chinese Taipei										X			1						2	2
Trinidad and Tobago		X	X																2	2
Turkey											3	1							4	3
Ukraine						X	X	X	X		2		1		1	1			12	10
United States			X		X				X	X	5	1	4	2	2	2	3	2	27	24
Uruguay											1								1	1
Uzbekistan											2								2	2
Venezuela	X	X	X		X	X	X	X		X	3	1	1					1	17	12
Total: 74 NOCs	30	18	18	40	18	20	18	18	30	18	144	40	67	25	50	30	32	16	238	196

Legend

- TS — Team Sprint
- KE — Keirin
- SP — Sprint
- TP — Team Pursuit
- OM — Omnium
- RR — Road Race
- TT — Individual Time Trial
- Q — Quotas
- R — Riders

== Qualification timeline ==
The following is a timeline of the qualification events for the cycling events at the 2012 Summer Olympics.

Event	Date	Venue
Track
Close of the UCI Olympic Track Ranking 2010–2012 (at end of 2012 UCI Track Cycling World Championships)	April 8, 2012	Melbourne, Australia
Road
2010 African Continental Championship (men qualification)	November 10–14, 2010	Kigali, Rwanda
2011 Asian Cycling Championships (men qualification)	February 9–19, 2011	Nakhon Ratchasima, Thailand
2011 American Continental Championship (men qualification)	May 3–7, 2011	Medellín, Colombia
2011 UCI Road World Championships	September 19–25, 2011	Copenhagen, Denmark
2011 UCI World Tour Ranking	November 1, 2011	–
2010-2011 UCI Africa Tour	November 1, 2011	–
2010-2011 UCI America Tour	November 1, 2011	–
2010-2011 UCI Asia Tour	November 1, 2011	–
2010-2011 UCI Europe Tour	November 1, 2011	–
2010-2011 UCI Oceania Tour	November 1, 2011	–
2011 African Continental Championship (women qualification)	November 9–13, 2011	Asmara, Eritrea
2012 Asian Continental Championships (women qualification)	February 14–18, 2012	Kuala Lumpur, Malaysia
2012 Pan American Continental Championship (women qualification)	March 9–11, 2012	Mar del Plata, Argentina
UCI World Ranking (women)	May 31, 2012	–
Mountain Bike
2011 African Continental Championship	February 12–13, 2011	Cape Town, South Africa
2011 Oceanian Continental Championship	March 18–20, 2011	Shepparton, Australia
2011 Pan American Continental Championship	April 1–3, 2011	(Colombia) Chía, Columbia
2011 Asian Cycling Championships	June 10–12, 2011	Suzhou, China
Establishment of the UCI Olympic qualification ranking	May 23, 2012	–
BMX
2012 UCI BMX World Championships	May 25–27, 2012	Birmingham, United Kingdom
Establishment of the UCI Rankings by Nation	May 28, 2012	

== Track cycling ==
Qualification is entirely based on the Olympic Track Ranking 2010–2012. NOCs are limited to one rider or team per event, 9 men / 7 women in total. Within these limits, riders who have qualified in one cycling event will have the right to enter others.

=== Men's Team Sprint ===
Teams are of 3 riders

Event	Ranking by Nation	Qualified	Teams per NOC
Olympic Track Ranking 2010–2012	1 to 10	Germany; Australia; Great Britain; France; New Zealand; Russia; China; Japan; Poland; Venezuela	1
Total			10

=== Men's Sprint ===
Event	Ranking by Nation	Qualified	Athletes per NOC
Olympic Track Ranking 2010–2012	1 to 8	Czech Republic; Greece; Malaysia; Netherlands; South Africa; Spain; Trinidad and Tobago; United States	1
Individuals qualified for other events			1
1 rider per NOC qualified for Team Sprint		Australia; China; France; Germany; Great Britain; Japan; New Zealand; Poland; Russia; Venezuela	1
Total			18

=== Men's Keirin ===
Event	Ranking by Nation	Qualified	Athletes per NOC
Olympic Track Ranking 2010–2012	1 to 8	Canada; Colombia; Czech Republic; Greece; Malaysia; Netherlands; Spain; Trinidad and Tobago	1
Individuals qualified for other events			1
1 rider per NOC qualified for Team Sprint		Australia; China; France; Germany; Great Britain; Japan; New Zealand; Poland; Russia; Venezuela	1
Total			18

=== Men's Team Pursuit ===
Teams are of 4 riders

Event	Ranking by Nation	Qualified	Teams per NOC
Olympic Track Ranking 2010–2012	1 to 10	Australia; Belgium; Colombia; Denmark; Great Britain; Netherlands; New Zealand; Russia; South Korea; Spain	1
Total			10

=== Men's Omnium ===
Event	Ranking by Nation	Qualified	Athletes per NOC
Olympic Track Ranking 2010–2012	1 to 18	Argentina; Australia; Belgium; Canada; Chile; Colombia; Denmark; France; Germany; Great Britain; Hong Kong; Ireland; Italy; New Zealand; South Korea; Spain; United States; Venezuela	1
Individuals qualified for other events			1
Total			18

=== Women's Team Sprint ===
Teams are of 2 riders

Event	Ranking by Nation	Qualified	Teams per NOC
Olympic Track Ranking 2010–2012	1 to 10	Australia; China; Colombia; France; Germany; Great Britain; Netherlands; South Korea; Ukraine; Venezuela	1
Total			10

=== Women's Sprint ===
Event	Ranking by Nation	Qualified	Athletes per NOC
Olympic Track Ranking 2010–2012	1 to 8	Belarus; Canada; Cuba; Hong Kong; Japan; Lithuania; New Zealand; Russia	1
Individuals qualified for other events			1
1 rider per NOC qualified for Team Sprint		Australia; China; Colombia; France; Germany; Great Britain; Netherlands; South Korea; Ukraine; Venezuela	1
Total			18

=== Women's Keirin ===
Event	Ranking by Nation	Qualified	Athletes per NOC
Olympic Track Ranking 2010–2012	1 to 8	Belarus; Canada; Cuba; Hong Kong; Lithuania; Malaysia; New Zealand; Russia	1
Individuals qualified for other events			1
1 rider per NOC qualified for Team Sprint		Australia; China; Colombia; France; Germany; Great Britain; Netherlands; South Korea; Ukraine; Venezuela	1
Total			18

=== Women's Team Pursuit ===
Teams are of 3 riders

Event	Ranking by Nation	Qualified	Teams per NOC
Olympic Track Ranking 2010–2012	1 to 10	Australia; Belarus; Canada; China; Germany; Great Britain; Netherlands; New Zealand; Ukraine; United States	1
Total			10

=== Women's Omnium ===
Event	Ranking by Nation	Qualified	Athletes per NOC
Olympic Track Ranking 2010–2012	1 to 18	Australia; Belarus; Belgium; Canada; China; Colombia; Cuba; France; Great Britain; South Korea; Netherlands; New Zealand; Poland; Russia; Spain; Chinese Taipei; United States; Venezuela	1
Individuals qualified for other events			1
Total			18

== Road cycling ==
=== Men's road race ===
Event	Ranking by nation	Qualified	Athletes per NOC
2011 UCI World Tour	1st	Spain	5
2011 UCI World Tour	2nd	Belgium	5
2011 UCI World Tour	3rd	Italy	5
2011 UCI World Tour	4th	Australia	5
2011 UCI World Tour	5th	Great Britain	5
2011 UCI World Tour	6th	Germany	5
2011 UCI World Tour	7th	Netherlands	5
2011 UCI World Tour	8th	United States	5
2011 UCI World Tour	9th	Luxembourg	1*
2011 UCI World Tour	10th	Switzerland	5
2011 UCI World Tour	11th	France	4
2011 UCI World Tour	12th	Norway	3*
2011 UCI World Tour	13th	Ireland	3*
2011 UCI World Tour	14th	Denmark	4
2011 UCI World Tour	15th	Kazakhstan	2*
2011 UCI World Tour	Individual	Slovakia	1
2011 UCI World Tour	Individual	Costa Rica	1
2011 UCI World Tour	Individual	Latvia	1
UCI Africa Tour	1st	Morocco	3
UCI Africa Tour	2nd	Eritrea	1**
UCI Africa Tour	Individual	Algeria	1
UCI America Tour	1st	Colombia	3
UCI America Tour	2nd	Venezuela	3
UCI America Tour	3rd	Brazil	3
UCI America Tour	4th	Argentina	1**
UCI America Tour	5th	Canada	1**
UCI America Tour	6th	Uruguay	1**
UCI America Tour	Individual	Chile	1
UCI America Tour	Individual	Cuba	1
UCI America Tour	Individual	Ecuador	1
UCI Asia Tour	1st	Iran	3
UCI Asia Tour	2nd	Japan	2
UCI Asia Tour	3rd	Uzbekistan	2
UCI Asia Tour	4th	Malaysia	2
UCI Europe Tour	1st	Slovenia	3
UCI Europe Tour	2nd	Russia	3
UCI Europe Tour	3rd	Portugal	3
UCI Europe Tour	4th	Poland	3
UCI Europe Tour	5th	Turkey	3
UCI Europe Tour	6th	Belarus	3
UCI Europe Tour	7th	Lithuania	2
UCI Europe Tour	8th	Ukraine	2
UCI Europe Tour	9th	Croatia	2
UCI Europe Tour	10th	Czech Republic	2
UCI Europe Tour	11th	Serbia	2
UCI Europe Tour	12th	Bulgaria	2
UCI Europe Tour	13th	Austria	2
UCI Europe Tour	14th	Estonia	1**
UCI Europe Tour	15th	Norway	1***
UCI Europe Tour	16th	Sweden	1**
UCI Europe Tour	Individual	Romania	1
UCI Europe Tour	Individual	Hungary	1
UCI Europe Tour	Individual	Greece	1
UCI Oceania Tour	1st	New Zealand	2
2010 African Championship*	1st	Namibia	1
2010 African Championship*	2nd	South Africa	1
2011 American Championship	1st	Mexico	1
2011 American Championship	2nd	Guatemala	1
2011 Asian Championship	1st	South Korea	1
2011 Asian Championship	2nd	Hong Kong	1
Re-allocated Quota		Finland	1
Re-allocated Quota		Georgia	1
Re-allocated Quota		Moldova	1
Re-allocated Quota		Syria	1
Total			144

* Quota reduced to the number of riders in the ranking of the respective tour

** Quota reduced by one to accommodate for the individual qualifiers on the same tour

*** Additional quota places earned on the continental tour for countries with quota reduction due to lack of ranked riders on the world tour

=== Men's Individual Time Trial ===
Event	Ranking by nation	Qualified	Athletes per NOC
2011 UCI World Tour	1st	Spain	1
2011 UCI World Tour	2nd	Belgium	1
2011 UCI World Tour	3rd	Italy	1
2011 UCI World Tour	4th	Australia	1
2011 UCI World Tour	5th	Great Britain	1
2011 UCI World Tour	6th	Germany	1
2011 UCI World Tour	7th	Netherlands	1
2011 UCI World Tour	8th	United States	1
2011 UCI World Tour	9th	Luxembourg	1
2011 UCI World Tour	10th	Switzerland	1
2011 UCI World Tour	11th	France	1
2011 UCI World Tour	12th	Norway	1
2011 UCI World Tour	13th	Ireland	1
2011 UCI World Tour	14th	Denmark	1
2011 UCI World Tour	15th	Kazakhstan	1
UCI Africa Tour	1st	Morocco	1
UCI America Tour	1st	Colombia	1
UCI America Tour	2nd	Venezuela	1
UCI America Tour	3rd	Brazil	1
UCI America Tour	4th	Argentina	1
UCI Asia Tour	1st	Iran	1
UCI Asia Tour	2nd	Japan	1
UCI Europe Tour	1st	Slovenia	1
UCI Europe Tour	2nd	Russia	1
UCI Europe Tour	3rd	Portugal	1
UCI Europe Tour	4th	Poland	1
UCI Europe Tour	5th	Turkey	1
UCI Europe Tour	6th	Belarus	1
UCI Europe Tour	7th	Lithuania	1
UCI Oceania Tour	1st	New Zealand	1
2011 World Championship individual event	1st	Germany	1
2011 World Championship individual event	2nd	Great Britain	1
2011 World Championship individual event	3rd	Switzerland	1
2011 World Championship individual event	4th	Australia	1
2011 World Championship individual event	5th	Netherlands	1
2011 World Championship individual event	6th	Kazakhstan	1
2011 World Championship individual event	7th	Denmark	1
2011 World Championship individual event	8th	Spain	1
2011 World Championship individual event	9th	Sweden	1
2011 World Championship individual event	10th	Canada	1
Total			40

=== Women's Road Race ===
Event	Ranking by nation	Qualified	Athletes per NOC
2012 UCI ranking	1 to 5	Netherlands; Germany; United States; Italy; Great Britain	4
2012 UCI ranking	6 to 13	Sweden; Australia; Russia; Belgium; Canada; France; Brazil; South Africa	3
2012 UCI ranking	14 to 23	~~Lithuania~~; New Zealand; Venezuela; Cuba; Luxembourg; Ukraine; China; El Salvador; Belarus; Norway	1*
2012 UCI ranking	individual top 100	(Thailand) Jutatip Maneephan (Mexico) Mayra del Rocio Rocha (Finland) Pia Sundstedt (Chinese Taipei) Mei Yu Hsiao (Estonia) Grete Treier (Azerbaijan) Elena Tchalykh (Japan) Mayuko Hagiwara (Poland) Sylwia Kapusta (South Korea) Ah Reum Na (Slovenia) Polona Batagelj	1*
2011 African Championship	1st	Mauritius	1**
2012 American Championship	1st	Chile	1**
2012 Asian Championship	1st	Hong Kong	1**
Total			66

* As other quota places are awarded to ranked athletes, the quota places for the ranked NOCs will be decreased to keep the total number of athletes constant.

**If, among the riders occupying the qualification places, there are athletes representing an NOC already qualified according to criterion n°1, it is the NOC whose rider who is ranked in the next place in the competition concerned who will benefit from the right to participate.

=== Women's Individual Time Trial ===
Event	Ranking by nation	Qualified	Athletes per NOC
2011 UCI World Tour Ranking	1 to 15	Netherlands; Germany; United States; Italy; Great Britain; Sweden; Australia; Russia; Belgium; Canada; France; Brazil; South Africa; ~~Lithuania~~; New Zealand	1
2011 World Championship individual event	1 to 10	Germany; Great Britain; Canada; Netherlands; United States; Sweden; ~~Australia~~; Azerbaijan; Russia; Italy; Finland	1
Total			25

== Mountain biking ==
A nation can enter a maximum of 3 men and 2 women.

=== Men ===
Event	Ranking by Nation	Qualified	Athletes per NOC
UCI Olympic qualification ranking	1 to 5	Switzerland; France; Czech Republic; Spain; Germany	3
UCI Olympic qualification ranking	6 to 13	Italy; Netherlands; South Africa; United States; Austria; Canada; Poland; Belgium	2
UCI Olympic qualification ranking	14 to 24	Great Britain; ~~Sweden~~; Australia; Japan; Brazil; Ukraine; Hungary; Russia; Argentina; Greece; Cyprus; Portugal	1
African Championship	1 to 2	Namibia; Rwanda	1
American Championship	1 to 2	Colombia; Costa Rica	1
Asian Championship	1 to 2	China; Hong Kong	1
Oceanian Championship	1	New Zealand	1
Additional Place for Oceania		Guam	1
Total			50

=== Women ===
Event	Ranking by Nation	Qualified	Athletes per NOC
UCI Olympic qualification ranking	1 to 8	Canada; Switzerland; France; Poland; United States; Slovenia; Germany; Norway*	2
UCI Olympic qualification ranking	9 to 18	Russia; Czech Republic; Italy; Austria; ~~Netherlands~~; New Zealand; Ukraine; Great Britain; Sweden; ~~Denmark~~; Hungary; Japan; Slovakia	1
African Championship	1	South Africa	1
American Championship	1	Colombia	1
Asian Championship	1	China	1
Oceanian Championship	1	Australia	1
Total			30

* Norway used only 1 spot.

== BMX ==
=== Men ===
Event	Ranking by nation	Qualified	Athletes per NOC
UCI Ranking by Nation of 28/05/2012	1 to 5	Australia; United States; France; Latvia; Netherlands	3
UCI Ranking by Nation of 28/05/2012	6 to 8	Colombia; New Zealand; Germany	2
UCI Ranking by Nation of 28/05/2012	9 to 11	Canada; Italy; Argentina	1
2012 UCI BMX World Championships	1 to 6	South Africa; Switzerland; Belgium; Philippines; Brazil; Denmark	1
Host Nation	1	Great Britain	1
Re-allocation of Unused Quota	1	Ecuador	1
Total			32

=== Women ===
Event	Ranking by nation	Qualified	Athletes per NOC
UCI Ranking by Nation of 28/05/2012	1 to 4	Australia; United States; France; Czech Republic	2
UCI Ranking by Nation of 28/05/2012	5 to 7	Colombia; Netherlands; New Zealand	1
2012 UCI BMX World Championships	1 to 3	Brazil; Lithuania; Venezuela	1
Host Nation	1	Great Britain	1
Re-allocation of Unused Quota	1	Latvia	1
Total			16
