= Grace Asare =

Ghanaian footballer (born 1989)

Personal information
- Date of birth: 12 October 1989 (age 37)
- Position: Defender

Senior career*
Years	Team	Apps	(Gls)
- Reformers Ladies

International career^{‡}
- Ghana
- * Club domestic league appearances and goals ‡ National team caps and goals as of 11 October 2014 (before the 2014 African Women's Championship)

Grace Asare (born 12 October 1989) is a Ghanaian footballer who plays as a defender for the Ghana women's national football team. She was part of the team at the 2014 African Women's Championship. At the club level, she played for Reformers Ladies in Ghana.
