= Sabrina Delhoum =

Algerian footballer (born 1976)

Personal information
- Date of birth: 21 May 1976 (age 50)
- Place of birth: Annaba, Algeria
- Height: 1.59 m (5 ft 3 in)
- Position: Midfielder

Senior career*
Years	Team	Apps	(Gls)
2003–2010	Alger Centre		

International career^{‡}
2006–2010	Algeria	6	(0)
- * Club domestic league appearances and goals ‡ National team caps and goals as of 8 November 2010.

Sabrina Delhoum (Arabic: صابرينا دلهوم; born 21 May 1976) is an Algerian former footballer who played as a midfielder. She has been a member of the Algeria women's national team.

== Club career ==
Delhoum has played for ASE Alger Centre in Algeria.

== International career ==
Delhoum capped for Algeria at senior level during two Africa Women Cup of Nations editions (2006 and 2010).
