= Nassira Rezig =

Algerian footballer (born 1983)

Personal information
- Date of birth: 4 November 1983 (age 42)
- Position: Goalkeeper

Senior career*
| Years | Team | Apps | (Gls) |
| 2009–2010 | Afak Relizane | | |

International career^{‡}
| 2010 | Algeria | 3 | (0) |
- * Club domestic league appearances and goals ‡ National team caps and goals as of 8 November 2010.

Nassira Rezig (Arabic: نصيرة رزيق; born 4 November 1983) is an Algerian former footballer who played as a goalkeeper. She has been a member of the Algeria women's national team.

== Club career ==
Rezig has played for Affak Relizane in Algeria.

== International career ==
Rezig capped for Algeria at senior level during the 2010 African Women's Championship.
