= Haoua Yao =

Burkinabé former footballer

Personal information
- Full name: Haoua Yao
- Date of birth: 2 July 1979 (age 47)
- Place of birth: Ouagadougou, Upper Volta
- Height: 1.74 m (5 ft 9 in)
- Position: Goalkeeper

Senior career*
Years	Team	Apps	(Gls)
2004–2005	Princesses		
2006	Sirènes du Kadiogo		
2010	Gazelles		
2011	Princesses		

International career^{‡}
	Equatorial Guinea	9	(0)
- * Club domestic league appearances and goals ‡ National team caps and goals as of 26 June 2011 (before the 2011 FIFA Women's World Cup)

Haoua Yao (born 2 July 1979), sportingly known in Burkina Faso as Farota, is a former footballer who played as a goalkeeper. Born and raised in Burkina Faso, she was naturalized by Equatorial Guinea to play for their women's national team, and was squad member for three Africa Women Cup of Nations editions (2006, 2008 and 2010) and 2011 FIFA Women's World Cup.

== Club career ==
Yao has played for Princesses, Gazelles and Sirènes du Kadiogo in Burkina Faso.

== Honours ==
Equatorial Guinea

  - Africa Women Cup of Nations: Winner in 2008 and runner-up in 2010
