= Sabbah Meftah Saoues =

French–Algerian footballer (born 1984)

Personal information
- Date of birth: 15 August 1984 (age 42)
- Place of birth: Villepinte, France
- Position: Midfielder

Senior career*
Years	Team	Apps	(Gls)
1998–1999	Blanc Mesnil		
2002–2008	Tours	35+	(4+)
2007	Tours B	1	(0)
2008–2010	Nord-Allier	36	(0)
2009	Nord-Allier B	1	(0)
2010–2012	Rodez	38	(1)

International career^{‡}
2010	Algeria	3	(0)
- * Club domestic league appearances and goals ‡ National team caps and goals as of 8 November 2010.

Sabbah Meftah Saoues (Arabic: صباح مفتاح صويس; born 15 August 1984) is a former footballer who played as a midfielder. Born in France, she has been a member of the Algeria women's national team.

== Club career ==
Meftah Saoues has played for Blanc Mesnil FFCS, Tours FC, FCF Nord-Allier Yzeure and Rodez AF in France.

== International career ==
Meftah Saoues was capped for Algeria at senior level during the 2010 African Women's Championship.
