= Nadjet Fedoul =

Algerian footballer (born 1981)

Personal information
- Date of birth: 28 October 1981 (age 45)
- Place of birth: Bologhine, Algeria
- Height: 1.62 m (5 ft 4 in)
- Position: Goalkeeper

Senior career*
Years	Team	Apps	(Gls)
1998–2002	Blida		
2002–2010	Alger Centre		

International career^{‡}
2006	Algeria	3	(0)
- * Club domestic league appearances and goals ‡ National team caps and goals as of 23 November 2018.

Nadjet Fedoul (Arabic: نادجيت فضول; born 28 October 1981) is an Algerian former footballer who played as a goalkeeper. She has been a member of the Algeria women's national team.

== Club career ==
Fedoul has played for FC Blida and ASE Alger Centre in Algeria.

== International career ==
Fedoul capped for Algeria at senior level during the 2006 African Women's Championship.
