= Leticia Zikpi =

Ghanaian footballer

Personal information
- Date of birth: 12 October 1986 (age 40)
- Position: Forward

Senior career*
Years	Team	Apps	(Gls)
- Immigration Accra

International career^{‡}
- Ghana
- * Club domestic league appearances and goals ‡ National team caps and goals as of 11 October 2014 (before the 2014 African Women's Championship)

Leticia Zikpi (born 12 October 1986) is a Ghanaian footballer who plays as a forward for the Ghana women's national football team. She captained the team at the 2014 African Women's Championship. At the club level, she played for Immigration Accra in Ghana.
