= Natalia Abeso =

Equatoguinean footballer

Personal information
- Full name: Natalia Obono Abeso Abuy
- Date of birth: 5 September 1986 (age 40)
- Position: Midfielder

Senior career*
Years	Team	Apps	(Gls)
- Las Vegas
- Inter Continental

International career^{‡}
	Equatorial Guinea	17	(1)
- * Club domestic league appearances and goals ‡ National team caps and goals as of 26 June 2011 (before the 2011 FIFA Women's World Cup)

Natalia Obono Abeso Abuy (born 5 September 1986) is an Equatoguinean former footballer who played as a midfielder for the Equatorial Guinea women's national football team. She was part of the team at the 2011 FIFA Women's World Cup. At the club level, she plays for Inter Continental in Equatorial Guinea.
