= Lucrecia Ngui =

Equatoguinean footballer

Lucrecia
Personal information
- Full name: Lucrecia Ngui Engonga
- Date of birth: 24 October 1988 (age 38)
- Place of birth: Mongomo, Equatorial Guinea
- Position: Midfielder

Senior career*
Years	Team	Apps	(Gls)
- Estrellas de E'Waiso Ipola

International career^{‡}
	Equatorial Guinea	6	(1)
- * Club domestic league appearances and goals ‡ National team caps and goals as of 26 June 2011 (before the 2011 FIFA Women's World Cup)

Lucrecia Ngui Engonga (born 24 October 1988), simply known as Lucrecia, is an Equatoguinean footballer who plays as a midfielder. She is a member of the Equatorial Guinea women's national football team. She was part of the team at the 2011 FIFA Women's World Cup.
