= Sabrina Moussaoui =

Algerian footballer (born 1984)

Personal information
- Date of birth: 25 March 1984 (age 42)
- Position: Midfielder

Senior career*
| Years | Team | Apps | (Gls) |
| 2009–2010 | Affak Relizane | | |

International career^{‡}
| 2010 | Algeria | 2 | (0) |
- * Club domestic league appearances and goals ‡ National team caps and goals as of 8 November 2010.

Sabrina Moussaoui (Arabic: صابرينا موسوي; born 25 March 1984) is an Algerian former footballer who played as a midfielder. She has been a member of the Algeria women's national team.

== Club career ==
Moussaoui has played for Affak Relizane in Algeria.

== International career ==
Moussaoui capped for Algeria at senior level during the 2010 African Women's Championship.
