= Adrienne Ndongo Fouda =

Cameroonian women's football goalkeeper and coach

Personal information
- Date of birth: 10 July 1990 (age 36)
- Place of birth: Yaoundé, Cameroon
- Position: Goalkeeper

Youth career
- Canon de Yaoundé

Senior career*
Years	Team	Apps	(Gls)
2008–2010	Canon de Yaoundé		
2011–2012	FK Minsk	2	(0)
2012–	ACS Vasas Femina		

International career
- Cameroon
- * Club domestic league appearances and goals

Adrienne Ndongo Fouda (10 July 1990 in Yaoundé) is a former Cameroonian football player and current football coach.

== Career ==
=== Club career ===
Fouda played for Canon Yaoundé where her performances in the Cameroonian league attracted European scouts. In the spring of 2011, she moved to Belarus after signing her first professional contract abroad with the Belarusian side FK Minsk. There, she made her debut for FK Minsk in the Belarusian Women's Premier League against FK Nadezhda Mogilev on May 25, 2011. In the summer of 2012, she left the Belarusian capital and transferred to the Romanian club ACS Vasas Femina in the Liga I Feminin.

She played for the 2011 and 2012 seasons before returning to Cameroon.

=== National team ===
Fouda first participated for Cameroon in the WAFCON (Women's Africa Cup of Nations) de football in 2010 and was also nominated in 2012.
