= Rosine Siewe Yamaleu =

Cameroonian footballer

Personal information
- Date of birth: 25 November 1991 (age 34)
- Height: 1.66 m (5 ft 5 in)
- Position: Defender

Senior career*
Years	Team	Apps	(Gls)
- Franck Rohliceck S.A

International career
	Cameroon	1+	
- * Club domestic league appearances and goals

Rosine Siewe Yamaleu (born 25 November 1991) is a Cameroonian women's international footballer who plays as a defender. She is a member of the Cameroon women's national football team. She was part of the team at the 2010 and 2012 editions of the African Women's Championship. She made one appearance in the 2010 tournament against Ghana as an 85th-minute substitute for Jeannette Yango. On club level she played for Franck Rohliceck S.A in Cameroon.
