= Joanna van de Winkel =

South African cyclist

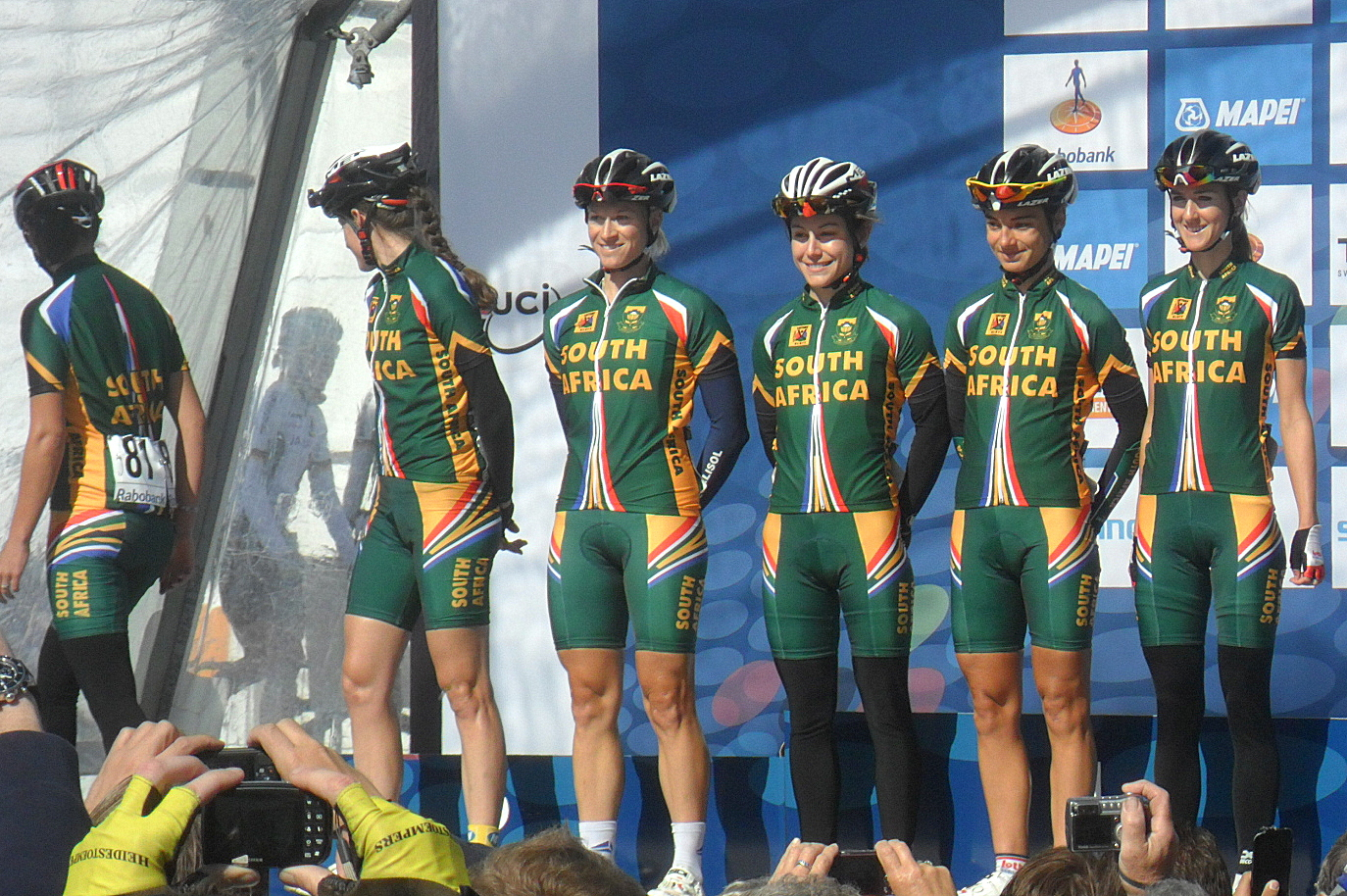
Joanna van de Winkel at the 2012 UCI Road World Championships

Joanna van de Winkel is a South African road bicycle racer. She competed at the 2012 Summer Olympics in the Women's road race.
