= Joseph Mkhonza =

South African football manager (born 1953)

Personal information
- Full name: Joseph Mkhonzana Mkhonza
- Date of birth: 2 September 1953 (age 73)

Managerial career
- Years: Team
- 2012–2014: South Africa Women

Joseph Mkhonzana Mkhonza (born 2 September 1953) is a South African football manager.

He is the father of former South African international football player Siphiwe Mkhonza

== Career ==
Mkhonza was the head coach of the South Africa women's national team at the 2012 Summer Olympics.
