= Gabisile Hlumbane =

South Africa soccer player (born 1986)

Personal information
- Date of birth: 20 December 1986 (age 39)
- Place of birth: KwaThema, South Africa
- Height: 1.64 m (5 ft 5 in)
- Position: Midfielder

Senior career*
Years	Team	Apps	(Gls)
1997–2005	KwaThema Ladies		
2005–?	University of the Free State		

International career
2010–?	South Africa	44	(0)
- * Club domestic league appearances and goals

Gabisile Hlumbane (born 20 December 1986) is a South African former soccer player who played as a midfielder. She represented the South Africa national team at the 2012 London Olympics.

== Career ==
Hlumbane was born in KwaThema, Gauteng. She started playing soccer at the age of 11 for KwaThema Ladies. Her father bought soccer boots and watched her play regularly while her mother didn't like the fact that she played soccer.

She joined Kovsie Ladies in 2005 after being named the Gauteng Schools Sports Girl of the Year in 2004 for scoring 8 goals in a tournament. She was recruited by the chairwoman of women's soccer, Nomsa Mahlangu.

At the University of the Free State she studied municipal financial management, she was also the captain and teammate of the late Eudy Simelane who nicknamed her China for her small eyes.

In 2011, she was named the University of Free State Sportswoman of the Year, the first black person to achieve the feat and was also nominated for Free State Sportswoman of the Year.
