= Amanda Sister =

South African soccer player

Personal information
- Date of birth: 1 March 1990 (age 36)
- Place of birth: Port Elizabeth, South Africa
- Height: 1.70 m (5 ft 7 in)
- Position: Defender

Senior career*
Years	Team	Apps	(Gls)
?–2015	Liverpool Ladies	?	(?)
2015–2016	Győri ETO	32	(0)
2016–?	San Zaccaria	?	(?)

International career^{‡}
?–?	South Africa	40+	(2+)
- * Club domestic league appearances and goals as of 10:23, 13 February 2021 (UTC) ‡ National team caps and goals as of 10:23, 13 February 2021 (UTC)

Amanda Sister (born 1 March 1990) is a South African women's footballer, who plays as a defender. She has made over 40 appearances for the South Africa women's national football team, and competed at the 2012 Summer Olympics. At club level, she most recently played for Italian club San Zaccaria.

== Club career ==
Sister has played for South African club Liverpool Ladies in the Eastern Cape Sasol Women's Football League. In 2015, she signed for Hungarian Női NB I club Győri ETO. She signed a two-year contract, and became the team's highest earning player. Sister made her debut against Kóka KSK; Győri ETO won the match 3–0. In 2016, Sister signed for Italian Serie A club San Zaccaria on a two-year contract.

== International career ==
Sister has made over 40 appearances for the South Africa women's national football team. In 2010, she scored in a match against Mali. In the same year, she competed at the 2010 African Women's Championship, where South Africa finished third. She represented South Africa at the 2012 Cyprus Women's Cup, and the 2012 Summer Olympics, where South Africa drew one match and lost two matches.

Sister scored a goal in a warmup match against Cameroon prior to the 2012 African Women's Championship; she had missed two previous games against Zimbabwe to rest an injury. At the 2012 African Women's Championship, Sister failed a drug test. She was suspended until 16 December 2013; originally, she was given a two-year ban, but that was reduced to one year by the Confederation of African Football (CAF). The doctor who administered the drug admitted responsibility, and was subsequently banned for four years.

Sister returned to the national squad in 2014. She was not selected in the South African squad for the 2015 African Games in the Republic of the Congo, as Sister was finalising a move to Győri ETO.
