= Sanah Mollo =

South African soccer player

Personal information
- Date of birth: 30 January 1987 (age 39)
- Place of birth: Villiers, South Africa
- Position: Midfielder

Senior career*
Years	Team	Apps	(Gls)
- Bloemfontein Celtic Ladies
- Mamelodi Sundowns Ladies

International career^{‡}
2006–2016	South Africa	65	(21)
- * Club domestic league appearances and goals as of 11 August 2014 ‡ National team caps and goals as of 27 November 2016

Sanah Mollo (born 30 January 1987) is a former South African soccer player who last played as a defender for Mamelodi Sundowns Ladies and has represented the South Africa women's national football team, including at the Summer Olympics football tournaments.

== Football career ==
=== Club ===
Sanah Mollo was born in Villiers, Free State on 30 January 1987, and began playing football at the age of nine for The Birds FC, an amateur team. Her parents initially opposed her attendance at the club but eventually became supportive. She continued to play while at high school, and was offered a sports bursary to attend the University of the Free State after playing against them. At a club level, she currently plays for Mamelodi Sundowns.

=== International ===
From a young age, Mollo wanted to play for the South Africa women's national football team, and she made her debut in 2006 in a match against Senegal. She has continued to appear in the squads for tournaments over the years, including at the 2012 and 2016 Summer Olympics. She was a member of the team that was runners-up at the 2012 African Women's Championship.

== Personal ==
Mollo holds a marketing degree from the University of the Free State. She works full-time in customer management, working around training and taking time off during tournaments to allow her to play for South Africa. She isn't paid by her club, but is given a travel stipend, and receives some funds from the national team.
