= Kylie Louw =

South Africa soccer player

Personal information
- Full name: Kylie-Ann Louw
- Date of birth: 15 January 1989 (age 37)
- Place of birth: Johannesburg, South Africa
- Height: 1.62 m (5 ft 4 in)
- Position: Midfielder

College career
Years	Team	Apps	(Gls)
2009–2012	Stephen F. Austin Ladyjacks		(27)

International career
2006–2012	South Africa	76	(7)

Managerial career
- 2019–2022: Northern Arizona Lumberjacks

Kylie Ann Louw (born 15 January 1989, Johannesburg) is a South African former footballer who played as a midfielder. She played for Stephen F. Austin State University. She represented the South Africa women's national soccer team at the 2012 Summer Olympics.
