= Marry Ntsweng =

South African soccer player (born 1989)

Personal information
- Date of birth: 19 December 1989 (age 36)
- Place of birth: Ga-Mphahlele, South Africa
- Position: Midfielder

Team information
- Current team: Adamstown Rosebud FC

Youth career
- –: Ga-Mphahlele Ladies

Senior career*
Years	Team	Apps	(Gls)
- Tshwane University of Technology
–	Mamelodi Sundowns Ladies		
2022	Tshwane University of Technology		
2023–2024	JVW		
- Maitland Magpies

International career
–	South Africa U/20	48	(1)
2007–	South Africa	48	(1)
- * Club domestic league appearances and goals as of 11 August 2014

Marry Ntsweng (also spelled Mary Ntsweng; born 19 December 1989) is a South African soccer player who plays as a midfielder for NPL Northern New South Wales club Maitland Magpies and the South Africa women's national team.

She represented the South Africa women's national football team at the 2012 London Olympics.

In 2011 she participated the 2011 Summer Universiade.

In 2025 she joined NPL Northern New South Wales club Maitland Magpies. She scored a hattrick in her second game against New Lambton.
