= Formiga (footballer, born 1978) =

Brazilian footballer (born 1978)

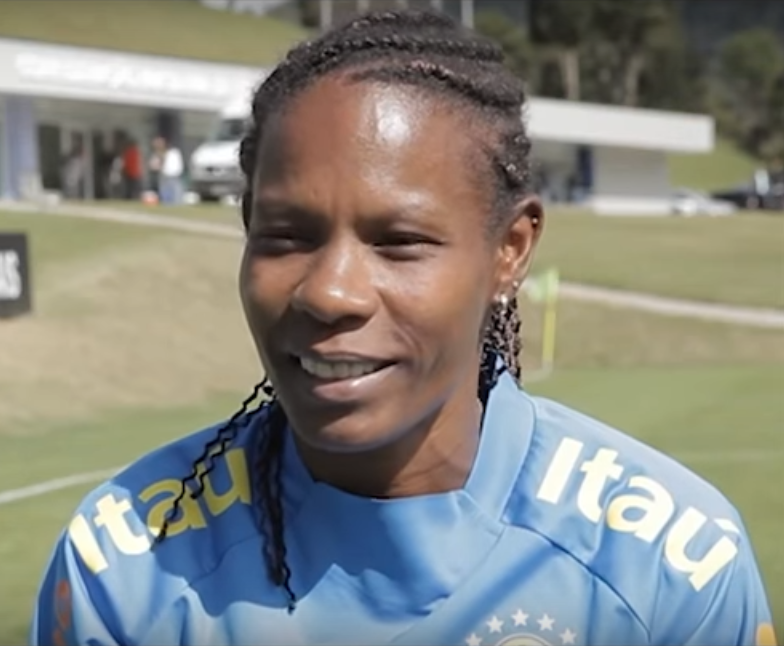
- Formiga in 2016

Personal information
- Full name: Miraildes Maciel Mota
- Date of birth: 3 March 1978 (age 48)
- Place of birth: Salvador, Bahia, Brazil
- Height: 1.62 m (5 ft 4 in)
- Position: Midfielder

Senior career*
Years	Team	Apps	(Gls)
1993–1995	Euroexport		
1996	Saad		
1997–1998	São Paulo		
1999	Portuguesa		
2000	São Paulo		
2001	Santa Isabel		
2002	Santa Cruz		
2002	Santos		
2003	Independente		
2004–2005	Malmö FF Dam		
2006–2007	Saad		
2006	→ New Jersey Wildcats (loan)	12	(13)
2007	→ Jersey Sky Blue (loan)	6	(1)
2008	Botucatu		
2009	FC Gold Pride	16	(0)
2010	Chicago Red Stars	23	(0)
2011	São José		
2012	América de Natal		
2013–2015	São José	20	(2)
2016	São Francisco do Conde	6	(2)
2017–2021	Paris Saint-Germain	68	(2)
2022	São Paulo	13	(0)

International career^{‡}
1995–2021	Brazil	206	(29)
Medal record
Women's football
Representing Brazil
FIFA Women's World Cup
Bronze medal – third place	1999 United States	Team
Silver medal – second place	2007 China	Team
Olympic Games
Silver medal – second place	2004 Athens	Team
Silver medal – second place	2008 Beijing	Team
South American Women's Football Championship
Gold medal – first place	1995 Brazil	Team
Gold medal – first place	1998 Argentina	Team
Gold medal – first place	2003 Peru	Team
Gold medal – first place	2010 Ecuador	Team
Gold medal – first place	2014 Ecuador	Team
Gold medal – first place	2018 Chile	Team
Pan American Games
Gold medal – first place	2003 Santo Domingo	Team
Gold medal – first place	2007 Rio de Janeiro	Team
Silver medal – second place	2011 Guadalajara	Team
Gold medal – first place	2015 Toronto	Team
- * Club domestic league appearances and goals as of 6 November 2022 ‡ National team caps and goals as of 26 November 2021

Miraildes Maciel Mota (born 3 March 1978), commonly known as Formiga (Portuguese for "ant"), is a Brazilian former footballer who played as a midfielder. She previously played for professional clubs in Sweden, the United States and France. Formiga holds many international records as a member of the Brazil national team, being the only player present in seven Olympic Games tournaments of women's football from the first edition at the 1996 Summer Olympics to 2020 edition, and a record for appearing at seven different FIFA Women's World Cup tournaments.

Formiga was a member of the Brazil national team for 26 years (the longest in football history) and is the most capped football player (male or female) in the history of the Brazil national teams, gaining her 234th and final cap in a 6–1 win over India at the 2021 International Women's Football Tournament of Manaus. She is the only football player in history (male or female) to play in seven World Cups and seven Olympic Games.

== Club career ==
=== Early career ===
Born in Salvador, Formiga was born during a period when it had become illegal for women to play football in Brazil. The family moved to nearby Camaçari when she was nine years old. Formiga began playing football at the age of 12, although she was sometimes beaten up by her brother who did not want her to join in. She was supported by her mother, Dona Celeste, who took her to play futsal for the nearby Euroexport club. During the teenage years she received the nickname "Formiga", Portuguese for ant, as an spectator watching one of her games claimed that she looked liked an ant playing against bigger and older men. Formiga once stated: “I have always hated my nickname”.

Formiga performed well at Euroexport and had a good relationship with the coach Dilma Mendes. She came to the notice of national team selectors while at Euroexport, but when national team players were encouraged to move to São Paulo-based clubs in preparation for the 1996 Olympics, coach Mendes helped her to sign for Saad. In 1997 Formiga joined newly-formed São Paulo FC where she won state and national titles. São Paulo FC closed their women's section in 2000 and Formiga did not play in the controversial 2001 Campeonato Paulista de Futebol Feminino.

She was among six Brazilian players reported to have engaged a FIFA-licensed agent with a view to joining the nascent Women's United Soccer Association in the United States. However she was not included in the 2000 WUSA foreign player allocation and instead played the 2001 season with Santa Isabel of Ubá, Minas Gerais. She joined a competitive team assembled under Formiga's former Saad and national team coach Dema, which won the 2001 Campeonato Brasileiro as hosts.

In 2002 Formiga spent a brief period with Santos, joining alongside Valeria and playing under future national team coach Kleiton Lima. She was restricted to local friendly appearances as the São Paulo state and national competitions had collapsed. Also in 2002, Formiga was part of Santa Cruz's Minas Gerais state championship-winning team.

=== Sweden ===
Immediately after playing at the 2004 Athens Olympics, Formiga joined the Swedish Damallsvenskan as a member of Malmö FF Dam. She had been playing indoor football for the previous two years. Formiga made a favourable impression in her first two months with the club, who were pleased when she agreed to extend her contract in December 2004. Private sponsors agreed to cover her substantial 75,000kr salary for the first half of the 2005 season. She helped Malmö finish second in 2005, but the club could not afford to extend her contract again, describing her as "an expensive solution".

=== Brazil ===
At the inaugural 2007 edition of the Copa do Brasil de Futebol Feminino, Formiga helped Saad (playing under the banner of Mato Grosso do Sul) beat Botucatu on penalties after a 1–1 draw in the final at Estádio Nacional Mané Garrincha in Brasília. She left the field in an ambulance before the shootout having fallen ill, but later returned to join in the celebrations. In 2008, she played for Botucatu and scored in the second leg of their Campeonato Paulista final victory over Saad. Formiga enjoyed playing for Botucatu and rejoined the team for their 2009 Copa do Brasil de Futebol Feminino campaign. She missed a late penalty kick in the 3–0 final defeat by Santos.

=== United States ===
With the New Jersey Wildcats in the 2006 USL W-League season, Formiga was deployed as a forward, scoring 13 goals in 12 games. She returned to the USL W-League in 2007 with Jersey Sky Blue, where she was less prolific in front of goal: scoring once in six appearances but serving five assists.

Formiga was the first overall pick for the newly inaugurated Women's Professional Soccer (WPS) league in the United States in the 2008 WPS International Draft, selected by FC Gold Pride of Santa Clara, California. She joined a Brazilian enclave at the club, alongside teammates Érika and Adriane, as well as assistant coach Sissi (who made a playing comeback in the second half of the season). Formiga started 15 of her 16 games for Gold Pride, who finished seventh of seven teams in their inaugural season in 2009. She was a late selection for the 2009 WPS All-Star Game as a replacement for five English and French players who were absent at UEFA Women's Euro 2009, but was herself ruled out with a knee sprain.

The following season, Formiga played for Chicago Red Stars, alongside compatriot Cristiane. In the 2010 Chicago Red Stars season the club finished sixth of seven teams, then withdrew from the WPS at the end of the campaign.

=== Back to Brazil ===
In 2011, Formiga returned to her home country to play for São José. She helped her new club win the 2011 edition of the Copa Libertadores as tournament hosts, scoring in the 2–1 semi-final win over holders Santos. The following year she helped São José win the 2012 Copa do Brasil de Futebol Feminino and Campeonato Paulista de Futebol Feminino, beating Centro Olímpico in both finals. However they lost their Copa Libertadores title after a penalty shootout defeat by Foz Cataratas in the 2012 semi-final. In 2012 Formiga also played for América de Natal in their undefeated Rio Grande do Norte state title-winning campaign.

São José remained competitive on all fronts in 2013, and in May Formiga scored in the 5–1 aggregate final win over Vitória das Tabocas to secure the 2013 Copa do Brasil de Futebol Feminino. She also equalised in São José's drawn Campeonato Paulista final with Ferroviária, but the competition rules saw their opponents win the title due to a better record in the first phase. In November São José recaptured the Copa Libertadores, defeating Formas Íntimas 3–1 in the 2013 final. The following month São José were beaten by Centro Olímpico in the inaugural Campeonato Brasileiro de Futebol Feminino final, after which Formiga reflected: "We're not going to win everything".

Formiga played as São José narrowly failed to win a third consecutive Copa do Brasil de Futebol Feminino in June 2014, losing the 2014 final on penalties to Ferroviária. She was absent when São José turned the tables on Ferroviária to win back the Campeonato Paulista in August 2014, but was back in the team which thrashed Caracas FC to collect a third Copa Libertadores title in November 2014. In December Formiga featured for São José at the 2014 International Women's Club Championship, which they won by beating English wild card entrant Arsenal Ladies 2–0 in the final at Nishigaoka Soccer Stadium, Tokyo.

Shortly after that success the São José team broke up and the entire coaching staff departed. Several leading players, including "símbolo da equipe" (English: symbol of the team) Formiga, were given central contracts by the Brazilian Football Confederation (CBF) and called into a new "seleção permanente" (English: permanent national team) intended as preparation for the 2015 FIFA Women's World Cup in Canada and the 2016 Rio Olympics.

Formiga briefly returned to São José in late 2015, when the club's new coach Emily Lima picked her in a draft which assigned the permanent national team players to clubs in the knockout stages of the Campeonato Brasileiro de Futebol Feminino. In the final she assisted Chú Santos's goal which leveled the second leg, but São José lost 2–1 to Rio Preto on aggregate. In 2016 the seleção permanente player draft sent Formiga to São Francisco do Conde, a team from her native Bahia.

=== France ===
In January 2017, following the expiry of her CBF contract, she signed for French Division 1 Féminine club Paris Saint-Germain. In 2016–17 she appeared in 16 games across Division 1, Coupe de France Féminine and the UEFA Women's Champions League. She made 24 appearances in 2017–18, and captained the team to their 1–0 Coupe de France final win over rivals Lyon. Although Formiga had turned 40 years old, missed part of the club season at the 2018 Copa América Femenina, and required a knee operation, she was well regarded at the Parisien club, who extended her contract in August 2018.

Having extended her contract by another year in May 2019, Formiga became the UEFA Women's Champions League's oldest ever goal scorer in Paris Saint-Germain's 7–0 Round of 32 win at Braga. A few weeks later she broke her own record by scoring in a 4–0 Round of 16 win over Breiðablik, at 41 years and 227 days old. A further one-year contract was agreed in May 2020.

In April 2021 Formiga took great satisfaction from contributing to Paris Saint-Germain's hard-fought 2020–21 UEFA Women's Champions League quarter-final win over dominant Lyon. Her 100th and final Paris Saint-Germain appearance came in June 2021; as a second-half substitute in a 3–0 win over Dijon which secured the club's first 2020–21 Division 1 Féminine title and denied Lyon a 15th consecutive championship.

=== Later career ===
Formiga agreed a return to São Paulo FC in June 2021, 21 years after her last successful spell with the club. She also had an offer from Flamengo. She announced her departure from São Paulo in December 2022, aged 44, after defeat in the Campeonato Paulista semi-final by Santos. She played 25 games in her second spell at the club, scoring once. She subsequently criticised São Paulo for its "disrespectful" policy of demanding that outgoing players return all their used club sportswear.

In January 2023 she was reported to be in negotiations with Cruzeiro Esporte Clube, but the Belo Horizonte club were unable to match her salary demands.

== International career ==
Formiga first played for the Brazil national team at the age of 17, as part of the squad for the 1995 FIFA Women's World Cup, playing as a substitute. The following year, during the inaugural tournament for women's football at the 1996 Summer Olympics, she became a regular starter in the Brazilian team. Formiga and Pretinha were the only two Brazilian players who participated in the first four Olympic Games tournaments of women's football, winning the silver medal in both 2004 and 2008 – both finals lost to the United States. She returned in the 2012 and 2016 tournaments, setting an outright record as the only player present in the first six editions of the Olympics tournament. She participated at the 2020 Summer Olympics in Tokyo, as well.

The 2019 FIFA Women's World Cup was Formiga's record-breaking seventh consecutive major tournament appearance; three players share the record of six consecutive appearances in the men's competition: Lionel Messi, Cristiano Ronaldo, and Guillermo Ochoa. Along the way, Formiga's Brazil reached third place in 1999 and were runners-up to Birgit Prinz's Germany in 2007. Formiga became the competition's oldest goalscorer with a goal against South Korea on 9 June 2015. She was 37 years, three months and six days old.

Formiga also won the gold medal in three editions of the Pan American Games, 2003, 2007 and 2015, and winning the silver in 2011 when Brazil was beaten by Canada. She scored in the 2003 final as Brazil beat Canada 2–1 with a golden goal to secure their first Pan American Games title.

Honestly, I would prefer to be at home right now, playing for a club, watching a new and exciting young Seleção, had any sort of renovation process actually taken place. We have to be here still, you know? For me to be here, though, defending this shirt, that gives me great pride and huge satisfaction, no doubt about it.

— Formiga in 2019

Formiga retired from the Brazil national team in 2016 but returned in 2018 to compete in the Copa América Femenina in Chile. She also appeared for Brazil at the 2019 World Cup, becoming the oldest player in the tournament's history at the age of 41.

On 1 December 2020, Formiga played her 200th match with Brazil in an 8–0 win over Ecuador. Formiga played in the 2020 Summer Olympics, to become the first female player to participate in seven Olympic Games.

In November 2021, she announced her second retirement from the Brazil national team. On 26 November 2021, aged 43, Formiga played her last match for Brazil in their 6–1 win over India at the 2021 International Women's Football Tournament of Manaus, officially retiring from the national team.

=== International goals ===
No.	Date	Venue	Opponent	Score	Result	Competition
1.	15 March 1998	Estadio José María Minella, Mar del Plata, Argentina	Argentina	2–0	7–1	1998 South American Women's Football Championship
2.	25 April 2003	Estadio Monumental "U", Lima, Peru	Peru	1–0	3–0	2003 South American Women's Football Championship
3.	27 April 2003	Estadio Monumental "U", Lima, Peru	Colombia	3–0	12–0	2003 South American Women's Football Championship
4.	20 August 2004	Pankritio Stadium, Heraklio, Greece	Mexico	2–0	5–0	2004 Summer Olympics
5.	20 August 2004	Pankritio Stadium, Heraklio, Greece	Mexico	4–0	5–0	2004 Summer Olympics
6.	23 September 2007	Tianjin Olympic Center Stadium, Tianjin, China	Australia	1–0	3–2	2007 FIFA Women's World Cup
7.	18 August 2008	Shanghai Stadium, Shanghai, China	Germany	1–1	4–1	2008 Summer Olympics
8.	12 September 2014	Estadio Federativo Reina del Cisne, Loja, Ecuador	Bolivia	1–0	6–0	2014 Copa América Femenina
9.	12 September 2014	Estadio Federativo Reina del Cisne, Loja, Ecuador	Bolivia	5–0	6–0	2014 Copa América Femenina
10.	9 June 2015	Olympic Stadium, Montreal, Canada	South Korea	1–0	2–0	2015 FIFA Women's World Cup
11.	7 April 2018	Estadio Municipal Francisco Sánchez Rumoroso, Coquimbo, Chile	Ecuador	4–0	8–0	2018 Copa América Femenina

== Style of play ==
She has cited Dunga, captain of the male Brazil national team that won the 1994 FIFA World Cup as the biggest influence on her playing style. She earned the nickname Formiga, which means ant in Portuguese, as a teenager because of her unselfish style of play which reminded fellow players of the way ants worked together as a colony.

== Personal life ==
Formiga married her female partner Erica Jesus in January 2023. The couple first met in 1996, but drifted apart due to the limited progress of LGBT rights in Brazil making out lesbian relationships difficult to maintain at that time. They met again in 2017.

A strong advocate of women's football in Brazil, Formiga is an activist athlete who has fought prejudice: "I had to work hard to conquer my space and prove who I was. Not only as a player, but also as... Miraildes Maciel Mota. Woman. Black. Northeast. Lesbian. And, above all, as a person who never thought of doing anything other than playing football."

== Honours ==
São Paulo

- Campeonato Brasileiro Feminino: 1997
- Campeonato Paulista de Futebol Feminino: 1997, 1999
- Torneio da Primavera Rio-São Paulo: 1997
- Brasil Ladies Cup: 2021

Botucatu

- Campeonato Paulista de Futebol Feminino: 2008

São José

- Copa Libertadores: 2011, 2013, 2014
- Copa do Brasil de Futebol Feminino: 2012, 2013
- International Women's Club Championship: 2014
- Campeonato Paulista de Futebol Feminino: 2012, 2014, 2015

Paris Saint-Germain

- Division 1 Féminine: 2020–21
- Coupe de France Féminine: 2017–18

Brazil

- Pan American Games: 2003, 2007, 2015
- Sudamericano Femenino: 1995, 1998, 2003, 2010, 2014, 2018
- Summer Olympics silver medal: 2004, 2008

Individual

- IFFHS CONMEBOL Woman Team of the Decade 2011–2020
- Trophées FFF D1 Féminine Team of the Year: 2017–2018

== See also ==
- List of women's footballers with 100 or more international caps
- List of athletes with the most appearances at Olympic Games
