= List of women's football clubs in Brazil =

This is a list of women's football clubs in Brazil, for men's football clubs, see the list of football clubs in Brazil.

Club	City	State
ABC	Natal	Rio Grande do Norte
AJA	Jaguariúna	São Paulo
Aliança	Goiânia	Goiás
America	Rio de Janeiro	Rio de Janeiro
Andirá	Rio Branco	Acre
Baré	Boa Vista	Roraima
Benfica	Juiz de Fora	Minas Gerais
Boa Vontade	São Luís	Maranhão
Boca Júnior	Cristinápolis	Sergipe
Botucatu	Botucatu	São Paulo
Caucaia	Caucaia	Ceará
Campo Grande	Rio de Janeiro	Rio de Janeiro
CEPE	Itabaiana	Sergipe
CEPE-Caxias	Duque de Caxias	Rio de Janeiro
CESMAC	Maceió	Alagoas
CEUNSP Salto	Salto	São Paulo
CRESSPOM	Guará	Distrito Federal
Flamengo	Rio de Janeiro	Rio de Janeiro
Desportiva Ferroviária	Cariacica	Espírito Santo
Ferroviária	Araraquara	São Paulo
Foz Cataratas	Foz do Iguaçu	Paraná
Genus	Porto Velho	Rondônia
Gurupi	Gurupi	Tocantins
Horizonte	Horizonte	Ceará
Independente	Belém	Pará
Internacional (MA)	São Luís	Maranhão
Internacional	Porto Alegre	Rio Grande do Sul
Iranduba	Iranduba	Amazonas
Juventude	Caxias do Sul	Rio Grande do Sul
Mato Grosso do Sul	Campo Grande	Mato Grosso do Sul
Mixto	Cuiabá	Mato Grosso
Moreninhas	Campo Grande	Mato Grosso do Sul
Nacional	Belo Horizonte	Minas Gerais
Náutico	Recife	Pernambuco
Oratório	Macapá	Amapá
Palmeiras	São Paulo	São Paulo
Potiguar de Parnamirim	Parnamirim	Rio Grande do Norte
Pelotas	Pelotas	Rio Grande do Sul
Rio Negro	Manaus	Amazonas
Rio Norte	Macapá	Amapá
River Plate	Guarabira	Paraíba
Saad	São Caetano do Sul	São Paulo
Santos	Santos	São Paulo
São Francisco do Conde	São Francisco do Conde	Bahia
São José	São José dos Campos	São Paulo
São José	São José dos Pinhais	Paraná
São Judas Tadeu	Jaguariúna	São Paulo
Scorpions	Florianópolis	Santa Catarina
Sport Recife	Recife	Pernambuco
Tiradentes	Teresina	Piauí
Trindade	São Gonçalo	Rio de Janeiro
Vasco da Gama	Rio de Janeiro	Rio de Janeiro
Vitória das Tabocas	Vitória de Santo Antão	Pernambuco

== See also ==
- List of football clubs in Brazil
