= 2010 Copa do Brasil de Futebol Feminino =

Tournament details
- Country: Brazil
- Teams: 32

Final positions
- Champions: (Rio de Janeiro (state)) Duque de Caxias/CEPE
- Runners-up: (Paraná (state)) Foz do Iguaçu

Tournament statistics
- Matches played: 56
- Goals scored: 190 (3.39 per match)

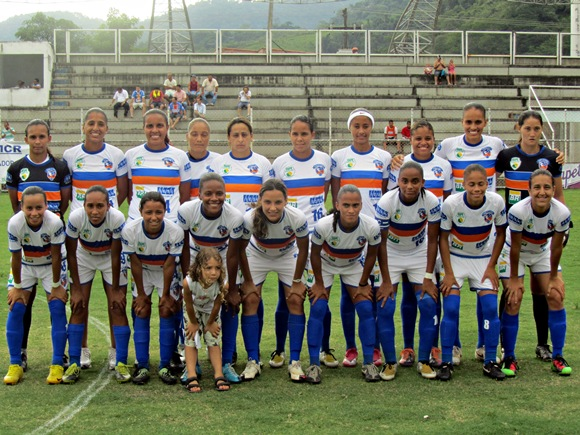

The 2010 Copa do Brasil de Futebol Feminino was the fourth staging of the competition. The competition started on August 16, 2010, and will conclude on December 4, 2010. 32 clubs of all regions of Brazil participated of the cup, which is organized by the Brazilian Football Confederation (CBF). The winner of the cup represented Brazil in the 2011 Copa Libertadores de Fútbol Femenino.

== Competition format ==
The competition was contested by 32 clubs in a knock-out format where all rounds were played over two legs and the away goals rule was used, but in the first three rounds, if the away team won the first leg with an advantage of at least three goals, the second leg would not be played and the club would be automatically qualified to the next round.

== Table ==
1st Round
Amazônia	1
São Raimundo-AM	5
Roraima	2 0
Oratório	0 2
Genus	1 0
Mixto	2 3
Internacional-MA	0 1
Pinheirense	1 6
Tiradentes	3 1
Fortaleza	0 1
Boca Júnior	0
Vitória-PE	6
Botafogo-PB	3 1
Potiguar	0 0
ECA	2
São Francisco	10
Atenas	1 0
Aliança	3 1
Iguaçu	0
Santos	7
Kindermann	8 2
GEPOL	0 0
Foz do Iguaçu	5 3
Guaíba	0 0
ASCCOP	4 3
Atlético Mineiro	1 2
Comercial	0
Francana	3
Vila Nova-ES	0
Duque de Caxias/CEPE	10
Volta Redonda	1 1
Botucatu	0 2

2nd Round
São Raimundo-AM	3 3
Roraima	0 0
Mixto	0 4
Pinheirense	0 1
Tiradentes	3 0
Vitória-PE	0 5
Botafogo-PB	2 0
São Francisco	1 3
Aliança	0 0
Santos	6 8
Kindermann	0 2
Foz do Iguaçu	0 3
ASCCOP	1 1
Francana	1 0
Duque de Caxias/CEPE	2 1
Botucatu	1 2

Quarterfinals
São Raimundo-AM	1 1
Mixto	2 1
Vitória-PE	0 2
São Francisco	1 2
Santos	1 0
Foz do Iguaçu	1 1
ASCCOP	1 0
Duque de Caxias/CEPE	1 1

Semifinals
Mixto	1 0
Duque de Caxias/CEPE	5 5
Foz do Iguaçu	1 3
São Francisco	2 1

Finals
Duque de Caxias/CEPE	1 1
Foz do Iguaçu	2 0

=== Semifinals ===
November 25

São Francisco	2 – 1	Foz do Iguaçu

Estádio Junqueira Ayres

November 28

Foz do Iguaçu	3 – 1	São Francisco

Estádio do ABC
November 25
21:00

Mixto	1 – 5	Duque de Caxias/CEPE
Bruninha 27'		Larissa 14' 90', Raquel 40', 51', Caneca 70'

Estádio Presidente Dutra
Referee: Franciele Bento

November 28
17:00

Duque de Caxias/CEPE	5 – 0	Mixto
Tatá 9', 71', Pitty 32', 59', Carol 48', Raquel 64'

Estádio Romário de Souza Faria
Referee: Janaína Gerlado da Costa

=== Third-place playoff ===
December 1

Mixto	2 – 0	São Francisco

Estádio Presidente Dutra

December 4

São Francisco	2 – 0 Penalties 4 - 2	Mixto

Estádio Junqueira Ayres

=== Final ===
December 1
20:00

Foz do Iguaçu	2 – 1	Duque de Caxias/CEPE

Estádio do ABC

December 4
17:00

Duque de Caxias/CEPE	1 – 0	Foz do Iguaçu

Estádio Romário de Souza Faria

2010 Copa do Brasil de Futebol Feminino

Duque de Caxias/CEPE
Champion
First title
