= 2007 in Brazilian football =

Football in Brazil
- Season: 2007

The following article presents a summary of the 2007 football (soccer) season in Brazil, which was the 106th season of competitive football in the country.

== Campeonato Brasileiro Série A ==
Pos	Team	Pld	W	D	L	GF	GA	GD	Pts	Qualification or relegation
1	São Paulo	38	23	8	7	55	19	+36	77	Qualified for both Copa Libertadores 2008 and Copa Sudamericana 2008
2	Santos	38	19	5	14	57	47	+10	62	Qualified for the Copa Libertadores 2008
3	Flamengo	38	17	10	11	55	49	+6	61	Qualified for the Copa Libertadores 2008
4	Fluminense	38	16	13	9	57	39	+18	61	Qualified for the Copa Libertadores 2008 by winning the Copa do Brasil 2007
5	Cruzeiro	38	18	6	14	73	59	+14	60	Qualified for the Copa Libertadores 2008
6	Grêmio	38	17	7	14	44	43	+1	58	Qualified for the Copa Sudamericana 2008
7	Palmeiras	38	16	10	12	48	47	+1	58	Qualified for the Copa Sudamericana 2008
8	Atlético Mineiro	38	15	10	13	63	51	+12	55	Qualified for the Copa Sudamericana 2008
9	Botafogo	38	14	13	11	62	58	+4	55	Qualified for the Copa Sudamericana 2008
10	Vasco da Gama	38	15	9	14	58	47	+11	54	Qualified for the Copa Sudamericana 2008
11	Internacional	38	15	9	14	49	44	+5	54	Qualified for the Copa Sudamericana 2008
12	Atlético Paranaense	38	14	12	12	51	50	+1	54	Qualified for the Copa Sudamericana 2008
13	Figueirense	38	14	11	13	57	56	+1	53	
14	Sport	38	14	9	15	54	55	−1	51	
15	Náutico	38	14	7	17	66	63	+3	49	
16	Goiás	38	13	6	19	49	62	−13	45	
17	Corinthians	38	10	14	14	40	50	−10	44	Relegated to 2008 Série B
18	Paraná	39	12	7	20	42	64	−22	43	Relegated to 2008 Série B
19	Juventude	38	11	8	19	43	65	−22	41	Relegated to 2008 Série B
20	América-RN	38	4	5	29	24	80	−56	17	Relegated to 2008 Série B

São Paulo declared as the Campeonato Brasileiro champions.

=== Relegation ===
The four worst placed teams, which are Corinthians, Paraná, Juventude and América-RN, were relegated to the following year's second level.

== Campeonato Brasileiro Série B ==
Pos	Team	Pld	W	D	L	GF	GA	GD	Pts	Promotion or relegation
1	Coritiba	38	21	6	11	54	41	+13	69	Promoted to 2008 Campeonato Brasileiro Série A
2	Ipatinga	38	20	7	11	60	41	+19	67	Promoted to 2008 Campeonato Brasileiro Série A
3	Portuguesa	38	17	12	9	63	46	+17	63	Promoted to 2008 Campeonato Brasileiro Série A
4	Vitória	38	18	5	15	68	50	+18	59	Promoted to 2008 Campeonato Brasileiro Série A
5	Fortaleza	38	17	5	16	51	46	+5	56	
6	Marília	38	17	8	13	66	61	+5	53 (Note: Marília was punished with the loss of 6 points)	
7	Criciúma	39	15	8	16	51	44	+7	53	
8	CRB	38	15	8	15	54	62	−8	53	
9	Brasiliense	38	14	11	13	57	53	+4	53	
10	São Caetano	38	13	14	11	45	39	+6	53	
11	Ponte Preta	38	13	13	12	58	55	+3	52	
12	Gama	38	14	9	15	53	56	−3	51	
13	Barueri	38	14	9	15	57	71	−14	51	
14	Santo André	38	13	12	13	51	50	+1	51	
15	Avaí	38	13	12	13	52	55	−3	51	
16	Ceará	38	13	11	14	58	58	0	50	
17	Paulista	38	12	9	17	58	61	−3	45	Relegated to 2008 Campeonato Brasileiro Série C
18	Santa Cruz	38	10	12	16	47	65	−18	42	Relegated to 2008 Campeonato Brasileiro Série C
19	Remo	38	10	6	22	53	69	−16	36	Relegated to 2008 Campeonato Brasileiro Série C
20	Ituano	38	8	9	21	41	74	−33	33	Relegated to 2008 Campeonato Brasileiro Série C

Notes:

Coritiba declared as the Campeonato Brasileiro Série B champions.

=== Promotion ===
The four best placed teams, which are Coritiba, Ipatinga, Portuguesa and Vitória, were promoted to the following year's first level.

=== Relegation ===
The four worst placed teams, which are Paulista, Santa Cruz, Remo and Ituano, were relegated to the following year's third level.

== Campeonato Brasileiro Série C ==
Final stage
Pos	Team	Pld	W	D	L	GF	GA	GD	Pts	Promotion
1	(São Paulo (state)) Bragantino/SP	14	7	5	2	21	13	+8	26	Promoted to the Série B
2	Bahia/BA	14	6	6	2	26	18	+8	24	Promoted to the Série B
3	(Goiás) Vila Nova/GO	14	7	2	5	26	19	+7	23	Promoted to the Série B
4	(Rio Grande do Norte) ABC/RN	14	7	2	5	20	21	−1	23	Promoted to the Série B
5	(Goiás) CRAC/GO	14	7	0	7	24	20	+4	21	
6	(Goiás) Atlético/GO	14	6	3	5	24	17	+7	21	
7	(Piauí) Barras/PI	14	2	4	8	15	31	−16	10	
8	(Paraíba) Nacional/PB	14	2	2	10	8	25	−17	8	

Bragantino declared as the Campeonato Brasileiro Série C champions.

=== Promotion ===
The four best placed teams in the final stage of the competition, which are Bragantino, Bahia, Vila Nova-GO and ABC, were promoted to the following year's second level.

== Copa do Brasil ==
The Copa do Brasil final was played between Fluminense and Figueirense.

May 30, 2007

Fluminense	1–1	Figueirense

Maracanã

June 6, 2007

Figueirense	0–1	Fluminense

Orlando Scarpelli

Fluminense declared as the cup champions by aggregate score of 2-1.

== State championship champions ==
State	Champion	State	Champion
Acre	Rio Branco	Paraíba	Nacional de Patos
Alagoas	Coruripe	Paraná	Paranavaí
Amapá	Trem	Pernambuco	Sport Recife
Amazonas	Nacional (AM)	Piauí	River
Bahia	Vitória	Rio de Janeiro	Flamengo
Ceará	Fortaleza	Rio Grande do Norte	ABC
Distrito Federal	Brasiliense	Rio Grande do Sul	Grêmio
Espírito Santo	Linhares FC	Rondônia	Ulbra Ji-Paraná
Goiás	Atlético Goianiense	Roraima	Roraima
Maranhão	Maranhão	Santa Catarina	Chapecoense
Mato Grosso	Cacerense	São Paulo	Santos
Mato Grosso do Sul	Águia Negra	Sergipe	América (SE)
Minas Gerais	Atlético Mineiro	Tocantins	Palmas
Pará	Remo		

== Youth competition champions ==
Competition	Champion
Campeonato Brasileiro Sub-20	Cruzeiro
Copa 2 de Julho	Internacional
Copa Macaé de Juvenis	Cruzeiro
Copa Santiago de Futebol Juvenil	Internacional
Copa São Paulo de Juniores	Cruzeiro
Copa Sub-17 de Promissão	Corinthians
Taça Belo Horizonte de Juniores	Flamengo

== Other competition champions ==
Competition	Champion
Campeonato Paulista do Interior	Guaratinguetá
Copa Amoretty	Caxias
Copa Espírito Santo	Jaguaré
Copa FPF	Juventus
Copa Governador do Mato Grosso	Luverdense
Copa Integração	Icasa
Copa Paraná	J. Malucelli
Copa Pernambuco	Sport
Copa Rio	Volta Redonda
Copa Santa Catarina	Marcílio Dias
Recopa Sul-Brasileira	Marcílio Dias
Taça Minas Gerais	Ituiutaba

== Brazilian clubs in international competitions ==
Team	Copa Libertadores 2007	Copa Sudamericana 2007	Recopa Sudamericana 2007
Atlético Paranaense	did not qualify	Preliminary round eliminated by (Brazil) Vasco	N/A
Botafogo	did not qualify	Round of 16 eliminated by (Argentina) River Plate	N/A
Corinthians	did not qualify	Preliminary round eliminated by (Brazil) Botafogo	N/A
Cruzeiro	did not qualify	Preliminary round eliminated by (Brazil) Goiás	N/A
Figueirense	did not qualify	Preliminary round eliminated by (Brazil) São Paulo	N/A
Flamengo	Round of 16 eliminated by (Uruguay) Defensor	did not qualify	N/A
Goiás	did not qualify	Round of 16 eliminated by (Argentina) Arsenal	N/A
Grêmio	Runner-up lost to (Argentina) Boca Juniors	did not qualify	N/A
Internacional	Group stage eliminated finished third in the group	did not qualify	Champions defeated (Mexico) Pachuca
Paraná	Round of 16 eliminated by (Paraguay) Libertad	did not qualify	N/A
Santos	Semi-finals eliminated by (Brazil) Grêmio	did not qualify	N/A
São Paulo	Round of 16 eliminated by (Brazil) Grêmio	Quarter-finals eliminated by (Colombia) Millonarios	N/A
Vasco	did not qualify	Quarter-finals eliminated by (Mexico) América	N/A

== Brazil national team ==
The following table lists all the games played by the Brazil national football team in official competitions and friendly matches during 2007.

Date	City	Opposition	Result	Score	Brazil scorers	Competition
February 6, 2007	(England) London	Portugal	L	0–2	-	International Friendly
March 24, 2007	(Sweden) Gothenburg	Chile	W	4–0	Ronaldinho (2), Kaká, Juan	International Friendly
March 27, 2007	(Sweden) Stockholm	Ghana	W	1–0	Vágner Love	International Friendly
June 1, 2007	(England) London	England	D	1–1	Diego	International Friendly
June 5, 2007	(Germany) Dortmund	Turkey	D	0–0	-	International Friendly
June 27, 2007	(Venezuela) Puerto Ordaz	Mexico	L	0–2	-	Copa América
July 1, 2007	(Venezuela) Maturín	Chile	W	3–0	Robinho (3)	Copa América
July 4, 2007	(Venezuela) Puerto la Cruz	Ecuador	W	1–0	Robinho	Copa América
July 7, 2007	(Venezuela) Puerto la Cruz	Chile	W	6–1	Juan, Baptista, Robinho (2), Josué, Vágner Love	Copa América
July 10, 2007	(Venezuela) Maracaibo	Uruguay	W	2–2 (5–4 pen)	Maicon, Baptista	Copa América
July 15, 2007	(Venezuela) Maracaibo	Argentina	W	3–0	Baptista, Ayala (own goal), Alves	Copa América
August 22, 2007	(France) Montpellier	Algeria	W	2–0	Maicon, Ronaldinho	International Friendly
September 9, 2007	(United States) Chicago	United States	W	4–2	Onyewu (own goal), Lúcio, Ronaldinho, Elano	International Friendly
September 12, 2007	(United States) Foxborough	Mexico	W	3–1	Kléber, Kaká, Alves	International Friendly
October 14, 2007	(Colombia) Bogotá	Colombia	D	0–0	-	World Cup Qualifying
October 17, 2007	(Brazil) Rio de Janeiro	Ecuador	W	5–0	Vágner Love, Ronaldinho, Kaká (2), Elano	World Cup Qualifying
November 18, 2007	(Peru) Lima	Peru	D	1–1	Kaká	World Cup Qualifying
November 21, 2007	(Brazil) São Paulo	Uruguay	W	2–1	Luís Fabiano (2)	World Cup Qualifying

== Women's football ==
=== Brazil women's national football team ===
The following table lists all the games played by the Brazil women's national football team in official competitions and friendly matches during 2007.

Date	Opposition	Result	Score	Brazil scorers	Competition
June 23, 2007	United States	0	1–2	-	International Friendly
July 12, 2007	Uruguay	W	4–0	Daniela Alves (2), Cristiane Silva, Rosana	Pan American Games
July 14, 2007	Jamaica	W	5–0	Kátia Cilene (2), Daniela Alves, Marta, Cristiane Silva	Pan American Games
July 18, 2007	Ecuador	W	10–0	Cristiane Silva (4), Daniela Alves, Marta (4), Pretinha	Pan American Games
July 20, 2007	Canada	W	7–0	Marta (5), Rosana, Daniela Alves	Pan American Games
July 23, 2007	Mexico	W	2–0	Rosana (2)	Pan American Games
July 26, 2007	United States	W	5–0	Marta (2), Cristiane Silva (2), Daniela Alves	Pan American Games
August 23, 2007	(Sweden) Umeå	W	2–1	Pretinha (2)	International Friendly (unofficial match)
August 28, 2007	(Sweden) Eskilstuna United	W	6–0	Marta (2), Formiga, Cristiane Silva, Kátia Cilene, Michele	International Friendly (unofficial match)
September 2, 2007	Japan	L	1–2	Cristiane Silva	International Friendly
September 12, 2007	New Zealand	W	5–0	Daniela Alves, Cristiane Silva, Marta (2), Renata Costa	World Cup
September 15, 2007	China	W	4–0	Marta (2), Cristiane Silva (2)	World Cup
September 20, 2007	Denmark	W	1–0	Pretinha	World Cup
September 23, 2007	Australia	W	3–2	Formiga, Marta, Cristiane Silva	World Cup
September 27, 2007	United States	W	4–0	Leslie Osborne (og), Marta (2), Cristiane Silva	World Cup
September 30, 2007	Germany	L	0–2	-	World Cup

The Brazil women's national football team competed in the following competitions in 2007:

Competition	Performance
World Cup	Runner-up
Pan American Games	Champions

=== Copa do Brasil de Futebol Feminino ===
The Copa do Brasil de Futebol Feminino final was played between Mato Grosso do Sul/Saad and Botucatu.

December 8, 2007

MS/Saad	1 – 1	Botucatu
Penalties
	5–4

Estádio Mané Garrincha, Brasília

Mato Grosso do Sul/Saad declared as the cup champions after beating Botucatu 5-4 on penalties.

=== Other domestic competition champions ===
Competition	Champion
Campeonato Carioca	CEPE-Caxias
Campeonato Paulista	Santos
