= Caio Couto =

Brazilian football manager (born 1976)

Personal information
- Full name: Caio Couto Gonçalves
- Date of birth: 29 January 1976 (age 50)
- Place of birth: Rio de Janeiro, Brazil
- Position: Left back

Youth career
- 1987–1994: Flamengo
- 1994: São Cristóvão
- 1995: Botafogo
- 1996–1997: Fluminense

Senior career*
Years	Team	Apps	(Gls)
1997–1998	Fluminense		
1999	Anapolina		
2000	Desportiva		

Managerial career
- 2000–2003: América de Natal (youth)
- 2004: Tigres do Brasil U20
- 2005–2007: Botafogo U13
- 2008–2011: Fluminense U15
- 2011–2012: Brazil U20 (women)
- 2012–2013: Vitória das Tabocas (women)
- 2014: Vitória das Tabocas
- 2014: Quissamã
- 2014–2015: Bonsucesso
- 2015–2018: Santos (women)
- 2019: Jaguariúna
- 2023: Audax Rio (assistant)
- 2023: Audax Rio
- 2023: Portuguesa-RJ
- 2024: Fluminense U20
- 2024: Portuguesa-RJ
- 2024–2026: Santos (women)
- * Club domestic league appearances and goals

Caio Couto Gonçalves (born 29 January 1976), known as Caio Couto, is a Brazilian football coach.

== Career ==
Born in Rio de Janeiro, Couto started his career with Flamengo, staying at the club until the under-17 category. He subsequently moved to Botafogo after a short stint with São Cristóvão, and finished his formation with Fluminense, where he started his senior career. He also played for Anapolina and Desportiva as a senior before retiring.

Shortly after retiring, Couto started working as a manager at América de Natal's youth categories. He was subsequently in charge of Tigres do Brasil's under-20 squad, Botafogo's under-13 squad and Fluminense's under-15 squad before being named manager of the Brazil women's under-20 team in 2011.

In March 2012, Couto was named manager of Vitória das Tabocas' women's team, leading the club to the semifinals of the 2012 Copa do Brasil de Futebol Feminino. On 21 November of the following year, he was appointed manager of the men's team, but resigned on 29 January 2014, after 18 points in 14 matches of the 2014 Campeonato Pernambucano.

Couto took over Quissamã in February 2014, and was subsequently presented in charge of Bonsucesso on 21 July of that year. He was sacked by the latter in February 2015, and was named manager of Santos' women's team in March.

Couto won the 2017 Campeonato Brasileiro de Futebol Feminino Série A1 with Peixe, but was still dismissed on 14 January 2018. On 11 February 2019, he returned to men's football after being named manager of Campeonato Paulista Segunda Divisão side Jaguariúna FC, but resigned on 24 April.

After working as a sports pundit on TV Cultura Litoral, Couto returned to coaching duties ahead of the 2023 season, being Júnior Lopes' assistant at Audax Rio. In February, after Lopes resigned, he was named the head coach.

On 9 April 2023, after reaching the finals of the Taça Rio, Couto was named head coach of Portuguesa-RJ. On 14 November, he was announced as head coach of the under-20 team of Fluminense, but returned to Lusa on 5 March 2024.

On 16 September 2024, Couto returned to the Sereias in the place of Gláucio Carvalho. Unable to avoid relegation, he led the side to the Campeonato Brasileiro de Futebol Feminino Série A2 title in 2025, but was sacked on 24 April 2026.

== Honours ==
Brazil U20 (women)

- South American U-20 Women's Championship: 2012

Vitória das Tabocas (women)

- Campeonato Pernambucano de Futebol Feminino: 2012

Santos (women)

- Campeonato Brasileiro de Futebol Feminino Série A1: 2017
- Copa Paulista de Futebol Feminino: 2024
- Campeonato Brasileiro de Futebol Feminino Série A2: 2025
