= Kleiton Lima =

Brazilian football manager

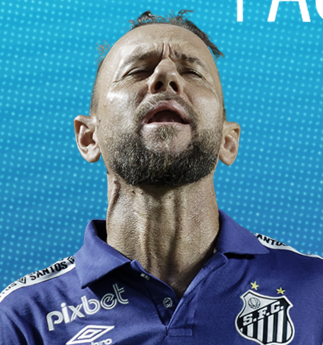
- Lima in 2022

Personal information
- Full name: Kleiton Barbosa de Oliveira Lima
- Date of birth: 5 May 1974 (age 52)
- Place of birth: Santos, Brazil
- Position: Midfielder

Youth career
- Santos

Senior career*
Years	Team	Apps	(Gls)
1992	Comercial-SP		
1993–1995	San Francisco All Blacks		

Managerial career
- 1997–2010: Santos (women)
- 2008–2011: Brazil (women)
- 2011: Vitória-PE
- 2011: Red Bull Brasil (assistant)
- 2012: São Caetano (assistant)
- 2012: Sport (assistant)
- 2012–2013: XV de Piracicaba (assistant)
- 2013: Sport (assistant)
- 2014: Grêmio Barueri
- 2015–2018: Santos B
- 2022–2023: Santos (women)
- 2024: Santos (women)
- * Club domestic league appearances and goals

Kleiton Barbosa de Oliveira Lima (born 5 May 1974), known as Kleiton Lima, is a Brazilian football coach.

== Playing career ==
Born in Santos, São Paulo, Lima was a midfielder during his playing days. After finishing his graduation with Santos, he went on to represent Comercial de Ribeirão Preto and San Francisco All Blacks as a professional. In 1994, after playing for the latter, he went on to help Carlos Alberto Parreira's staff as a scout after playing a friendly against Russia, an opponent of Brazil during the year's FIFA World Cup.

== Managerial career ==
=== Early success and Brazil women's national team ===
In 1997 Lima returned to Santos, being appointed manager of the women's team. He was also in charge of the country for three years, winning four major titles and finishing fifth in 2011 FIFA Women's World Cup. After being dismissed by Peixe in late 2010, he also had a short spell at Vitória das Tabocas' men's team.

=== Assistant in men's football ===
In December 2011 Lima moved to men's football, being an assistant of Sérgio Guedes at Red Bull Brasil. He remained as Guedes' second at São Caetano, Sport (two spells) and XV de Piracicaba.

=== Grêmio Barueri ===
On 28 February 2014 Lima was named head coach of Grêmio Barueri. After failing to avoid relegation from Campeonato Paulista Série A2, he was sacked on 18 June.

=== Return to Santos (B-team) ===
In April 2015 Lima returned to his first club Santos, being appointed head coach of the club's newly formed B-team. He was sacked in February 2018.

=== Second and third spell at Santos women's team and harassment incidents ===
On 29 August 2022, Lima returned to Santos and their women's team, after being again named head coach. He left the club on 7 September of the following year, after several players reported incidents of mobbing and sexual harassment.

On 2 April 2024, Lima returned to the Sereias da Vila for his third spell. Ten days later, Brazilian media outlet ge released an article with former players giving a statement where Lima was harassing them; the Campeonato Brasileiro de Futebol Feminino Série A1 match of Santos against Corinthians in the following day also had protests against harassment from several players from the opposing side.

On 15 April 2024, Lima stepped down from his coaching role, with Santos alleging that the coach "had been suffering criticism and even death threats in the last few days".

== Honours ==
Santos

- Copa do Brasil de Futebol Feminino: 2008, 2009
- Campeonato Paulista de Futebol Feminino: 2007, 2010, 2011
- International Women's Soccer Cup: 2004

Vitória-PE

- Campeonato Pernambucano de Futebol Feminino: 2011

Brazil

- South American Under-20 Women's Football Championship: 2008, 2010
- Torneio Internacional de Futebol Feminino: 2009
- Copa América Femenina: 2010
