= Bagé (footballer) =

Brazilian footballer (born 1983)

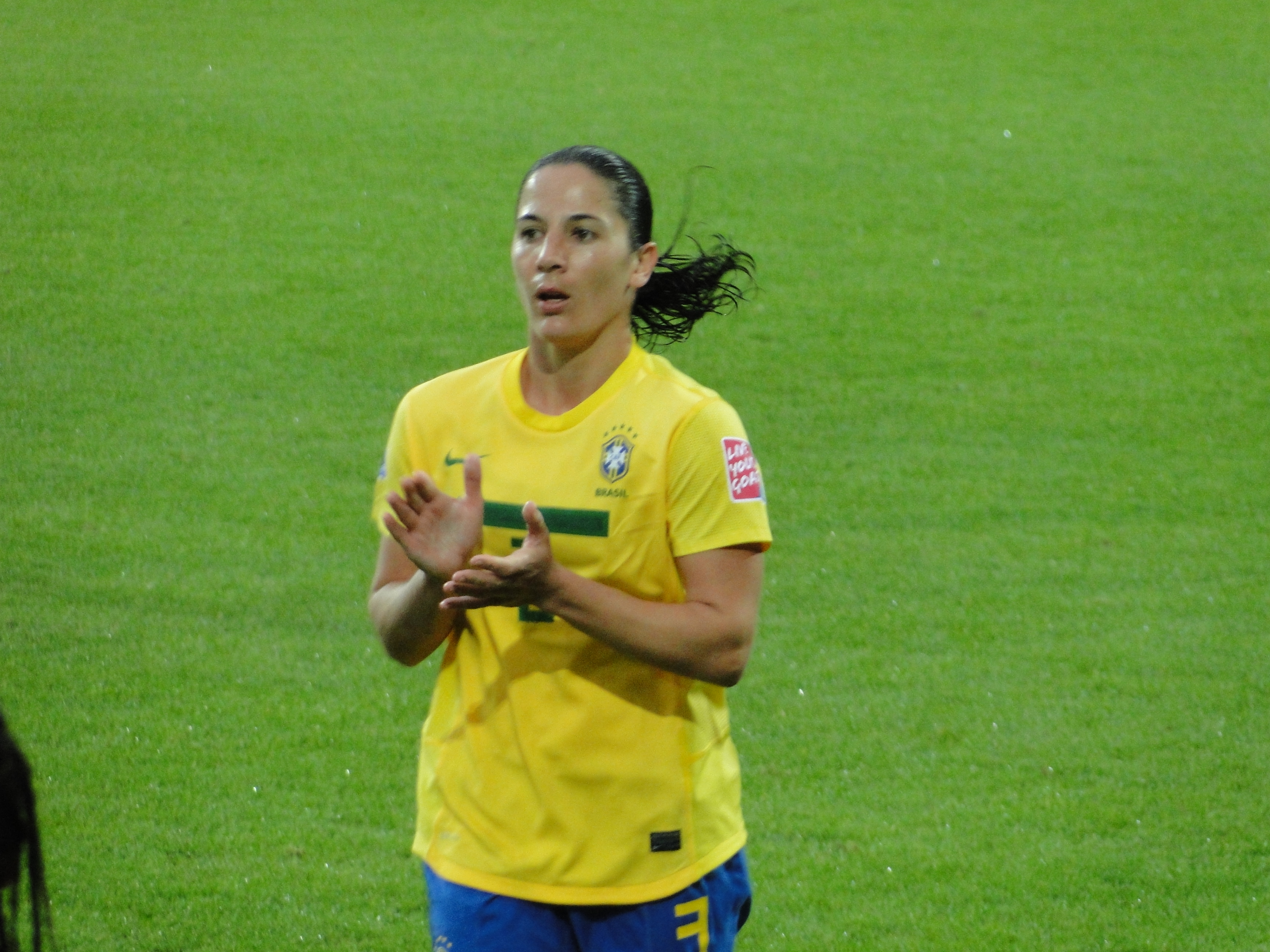
- Daiane at the 2011 FIFA Women's World Cup.

Personal information
- Full name: Daiane Menezes Rodrigues
- Date of birth: 15 April 1983 (age 43)
- Place of birth: Bagé, Rio Grande do Sul, Brazil
- Height: 1.73 m (5 ft 8 in)
- Position: Defender

Youth career
- AA Celeste

Senior career*
Years	Team	Apps	(Gls)
2001–2002	Grêmio		
2003–2005	São Bernardo		
2006–2009	Botucatu		
2010–2020	São José		

International career
2002	Brazil U-19		
2006–2013	Brazil		
Medal record
Representing Brazil
Football
Pan American Games
Gold medal – first place	2007 Rio de Janeiro	Team competition
Silver medal – second place	2011 Guadalajara	Team competition
Universiade
Bronze medal – third place	2011 Shenzhen	Team competition
- * Club domestic league appearances and goals

Daiane Menezes Rodrigues (born 15 April 1983), commonly known as Bagé, (Note: The name of Bagé, her hometown) is a Brazilian former footballer. She played as a defender for various Brazilian clubs and for the Brazil national team.

== Club career ==
Bagé was born in Bagé, Rio Grande do Sul. She began playing indoor football for a local team called Celeste, and was then scouted by Grêmio. At Grêmio she was converted from a defensive midfielder to a central defender, and that became her permanent playing position for the rest of her career. In 2003 she moved to São Bernardo at the suggestion of her youth international teammate Cristiane.

In January 2010 Bagé left Botucatu, where she had won the 2006 Taça Brasil, for São José. She played for São José in the 2014 International Women's Club Championship, featuring in the Brazilian club's 2–0 final win over English wild card entrant Arsenal.

The later part of Bagé's career was disrupted by knee injuries: an anterior cruciate ligament injury to her right knee in July 2013, followed by an identical injury in the left knee in April 2017 and a torn knee cartilage in October 2018. She left São José in January 2021.

== International career ==
=== Youth ===
Bagé played for Brazil at the 2002 FIFA U-20 Women's World Championship.

=== Senior ===
In November 2006 Bagé made her senior international debut in Brazil's 6–0 South American Women's Football Championship win over Venezuela at Estadio José María Minella, Mar del Plata.

Bagé was recalled to the national team just before the 2011 FIFA Women's World Cup, where she played as a sweeper alongside Aline and Érika in a back three. In Brazil's quarterfinal defeat by the United States, Bagé scored a second-minute own goal and had the only missed attempt for either team in the penalty shootout. Nevertheless she retained the support of her teammates.

In January 2012 Bagé was appointed to the captaincy of the national team, and described as "a born leader" by the coach Jorge Barcellos. At the beginning of the 2012 Summer Olympics tournament in London, she had 28 caps for the national team.

== Personal life ==
Bagé and her São José teammate Priscilinha had a side job selling ice cream at the Estádio Martins Pereira in 2012. In 2013 the duo also opened a car wash business. In 2014 Bagé was criticised for appearing in promotional materials for the fraudulent internet phone service company Telexfree.
