= 2011 Copa do Brasil de Futebol Feminino =

Tournament details
- Country: Brazil
- Teams: 32

Final positions
- Champions: (Paraná (state)) Foz Cataratas
- Runners-up: (Pernambuco) Vitória-PE

Tournament statistics
- Matches played: 48
- Goals scored: 167 (3.48 per match)

The 2011 Copa do Brasil de Futebol Feminino was the fifth staging of the competition. The competition started on August 18, 2011, and concluded on November 26, 2011. 32 clubs of all regions of Brazil participated of the cup, which is organized by the Brazilian Football Confederation (CBF).

Foz Cataratas won the final 2–0 and 3–0 over Vitória-PE and represented Brazil in the 2012 Copa Libertadores Femenina.

== Competition format ==
The competition was contested by 32 clubs in a knock-out format where all rounds were played over two legs and the away goals rule was used, but in the first three rounds, if the away team won the first leg with an advantage of at least three goals, the second leg would not be played and the club automatically qualified to the next round.

== Table ==
First round
São Raimundo-RR	1
Iranduba	5
Atenas	0 0
Tuna Luso	0 3
Santos-RO	1 0
Amazônia	0 3
Oratório	0 1
Viana	2 4
Força e Luz	0
Caucaia	6
Tiradentes	1 0
Vitória-PE	2 3
Botafogo-PB	3 3
União-AL	1 1
Canindé	2
São Francisco	7
Mixto	1 1
Atletas de Jesus	1 2
CRESSPOM	1
Santos	6
Kindermann	6 1
Canoas	0 0
Foz Cataratas	9 5
Flamengo-RS	0 1
Comercial	1
Atlético Mineiro	4
Iguaçu	0 0
São José	1 2
Duque de Caxias	1
Rio Preto	5
Colatina	1
Vasco da Gama	6

Round of 16
Iranduba	1 2
Tuna Luso	0 4
Amazônia	2
Viana	5
Caucaia	0
Vitória-PE	3
Botafogo-PB	0 0
São Francisco	1 1
Atletas de Jesus	0
Santos	6
Kindermann	1 0
Foz Cataratas	0 2
Atlético Mineiro	0 1
São José	2 0
Rio Preto	0 2
Vasco da Gama	0 0

Quarterfinals
Tuna Luso	1 0
Viana	1 1
Vitória-PE	6 4
São Francisco	2 0
Santos	1 0
Foz Cataratas	2 0
São José	1 4
Rio Preto	3 2

Semifinals
Viana	0 0 (6)
Foz Cataratas	0 0 (7)
Vitória-PE	2 2
Rio Preto	0 2

Final
Foz Cataratas	2 3
Vitória-PE	0 0

=== Semifinals ===
November 3
16:00 (UTC−03:00)

Viana	0–0	Foz Cataratas

Estádio Nhozinho Santos, São Luís

November 10
17:00 (UTC−03:00)

Foz Cataratas	0–0	Viana
Penalties
	7–6

Estádio Pedro Basso, Foz do Iguaçu

November 5
22:00 (UTC−03:00)

Vitória-PE	2–0	Rio Preto

Estádio Severino Carneiro, Vitória de Santo Antão

November 8
15:00 (UTC−03:00)

Rio Preto	2–2	Vitória-PE

Estádio Anísio Haddad, São José do Rio Preto

=== Final ===
November 19
22:00 (UTC−03:00)

Vitória-PE	0–2	Foz Cataratas
		Daiane Moretti 37', 90'

Estádio Severino Carneiro, Vitória de Santo Antão
Attendance: 5,500
Referee: Renan Roberto de Souza (Paraíba)

November 26
17:00 (UTC−03:00)

Foz Cataratas	3–0	Vitória-PE
Nenê 48'; Daiane Moretti 80'; Dessa 90+3'

Estádio Pedro Basso, Foz do Iguaçu
Referee: Simone Xavier Silva (Rio de Janeiro)

2011 Copa do Brasil de Futebol Feminino

Foz Cataratas
Champion
First title
