= 2015 Copa do Brasil de Futebol Feminino =

Tournament details
- Country: Brazil
- Teams: 32

Final positions
- Champions: Kindermann
- Runners-up: Ferroviária

The 2015 Copa do Brasil de Futebol Feminino was the ninth staging of the competition. The competition started on February 4, 2015, and concluded on April 8, 2015. 32 clubs of all regions of Brazil participated of the cup, which was organized by the Brazilian Football Confederation (CBF).

== Competition format ==
The competition was contested by 32 clubs in a knock-out format where all rounds were played over two legs and the away goals rule was used, but in the first two rounds, if the away team won the first leg with an advantage of at least three goals, the second leg would not be played and the club automatically qualified to the next round.

== Table ==
First round
SERC	0
São José	4
Juventus-CE	3 2
Vitória	2 2
Abelhas Rainhas	2 3
Viana	1 2
Comercial-ES	0
Kindermann	3
Santa Cruz-MG	2 2
Duque de Caxias	1 1
Náutico	0
São Francisco	3
Santana	1
Tuna Luso	11
Cruzeiro-RS	2 0
Ferroviária	4 2
Estrela Real	3 3
Aliança	2 1
Operário-MT	1 2
Rio Preto	3 2
São Raimundo-RR	0 0
Iranduba	0 2
União	0
Vitória das Tabocas	5
América-PE	2 0
União Desportiva	2 1
Genus	1 1
Assermurb	1 0
Chapecoense	0
Foz Cataratas	6
CRESSPOM	1 0
Botafogo	2 7

Round of 16
São José	3
Juventus	0
Abelhas Rainhas	0 1
Kindermann	1 3
Santa Cruz-MG	2 0 (4)
São Francisco	0 2 (5)
Tuna Luso	1 0
Ferroviária	2 5
Estrela Real	0
Rio Preto	3
Iranduba	1
Vitória das Tabocas	4
União Desportiva	3 5
Genus	1 0
Foz Cataratas	1 1
Botafogo	2c0

Quarterfinals
São José	0 1
Kindermann	3 1
São Francisco	0 3
Ferroviária	2 6
Rio Preto	1 1
Vitória das Tabocas	2 1
União Desportiva	0 0
Foz Cataratas	7 7

Semifinals
Ferroviária	5 1
Vitória das Tabocas	1 2
Foz Cataratas	1 0
Kindermann	0 3

Final
Ferroviária	3 2
Kindermann	3 5

=== Final ===
April 1

Ferroviária	3–3	Kindermann

Fonte Luminosa, Araraquara

April 8

Kindermann	5–2	Ferroviária

Estádio Carlos A.C. Neves, Caçador

2015 Copa do Brasil de Futebol Feminino

Kindermann
Champion
First title
