= 2009 Copa do Brasil de Futebol Feminino =

Tournament details
- Country: Brazil
- Teams: 32

Final positions
- Champions: (São Paulo (state)) Santos
- Runners-up: (São Paulo (state)) Botucatu

Tournament statistics
- Matches played: 47
- Goals scored: 223 (4.74 per match)

The 2009 Copa do Brasil de Futebol Feminino was the third staging of the competition. The competition started on September 24, 2009, and concluded on December 5, 2009. 32 clubs of all regions of Brazil participated of the cup, which is organized by the Brazilian Football Confederation (CBF). The winner of the cup represented Brazil in the 2010 Copa Libertadores de Fútbol Femenino.

== Competition format ==
The competition was contested by 32 clubs in a knock-out format where in the first three rounds was played over two legs and the away goals rule was used, but if the away team won the first leg with an advantage of at least three goals, the second leg would not be played and the club automatically qualified to the next round. The fourth round was played in one leg. The final and the third-place game was played in one leg in a neutral venue.

== Participating teams ==
The 2009 participating teams were the following clubs:

- Assermurb (Acre)
- CESMAC (Alagoas)
- Oratório (Amapá)
- Nilton Lins (Amazonas)
- São Francisco (Bahia)
- Caucaia (Ceará)
- CRESSPOM (Distrito Federal)
- Desportiva Capixaba (Espírito Santo)
- Aliança (Goiás)
- Boa Vontade (Maranhão)
- Mixto (Mato Grosso)
- Comercial (Mato Grosso do Sul)
- Atlético Mineiro (Minas Gerais)
- Iguaçu (Minas Gerais)
- Pinheirense (Pará)
- Botafogo-PB (Paraíba)

- Novo Mundo (Paraná)
- Sport (Pernambuco)
- Tiradentes (Piauí)
- CEPE-Caxias (Rio de Janeiro)
- Volta Redonda (Rio de Janeiro)
- Potiguar (Rio Grande do Norte)
- Pelotas (Rio Grande do Sul)
- Porto Alegre (Rio Grande do Sul)
- Juventus (Rondônia)
- São Raimundo (Roraima)
- Kindermann (Santa Catarina)
- Botucatu (São Paulo)
- Saad (São Paulo)
- Santos (São Paulo)
- Atlética Gloriense (Sergipe)
- São José (Tocantins)

== Table ==
1st Round
São Raimundo	3 0
Nilton Lins	0 2
Juventus	0 2
Assermurb	1 4
Oratório	2 1
Pinheirense	2 7
Tiradentes	2 5
Boa Vontade	2 1
Atlética Gloriense	0
São Francisco	6
CESMAC	3 4
Potiguar	1 1
Botafogo-PB	0
Sport	4
São José	0
Caucaia	4
Mixto	1 1
Aliança	0 2
CRESSPOM	1
Santos	4
Atlético Mineiro	2 2
Volta Redonda	1 1
Novo Mundo	8 6
Pelotas	0 1
Iguaçu	2 2
Saad	4 2
Comercial	0 0
Botucatu	2 8
Desportiva Capixaba	1
CEPE-Caxias	5
Kindermann	2 2
Porto Alegre	2 0

2nd Round
São Raimundo	3 4
Assermurb	1 1
Pinheirense	2 3
Tiradentes	2 1
São Francisco	4 10
CESMAC	1 0
Sport	0 2
Caucaia	2 2
Mixto	0 0
Santos	12 11
Atlético Mineiro	2 1
Novo Mundo	4 2
Saad	3 2
Botucatu	2 7
CEPE-Caxias	2 0
Kindermann	1 0

Quarterfinals
São Raimundo	4 2
Pinheirense	6 6
São Francisco	2 5
Caucaia	1 0
Santos	4 7
Novo Mundo	0 0
Botucatu	2 5
CEPE-Caxias	2 1

Semifinals
Santos	8
Pinheirense	0
Botucatu	6
São Francisco	0

Finals
Santos	3
Botucatu	0

=== Semifinals ===
November 26
21:00

Santos	8 – 0	Pinheirense
Maurine 8', 90'; Cristiane 59', 64', 67', 83'; Marta 75'; Érika 79'	Report

Estádio Alfredo de Castilho, Bauru
Referee: (Rio de Janeiro (state)) Simone Xavier de Paula e Silva

November 27
21:00

Botucatu	6 – 0	São Francisco

Estádio Alfredo de Castilho, Bauru

=== Third-place playoff ===
December 1
18:30

Pinheirense	1 – 5	São Francisco

Estádio do Pacaembu, São Paulo

=== Final ===
December 1
21:00

Santos	3 – 0	Botucatu
Marta 10', 71', Cristiane 39'	Report

Estádio do Pacaembu, São Paulo

2009 Copa do Brasil de Futebol Feminino

SANTOS
Champion
Second title
