= Lago Verde Esporte Clube =

Lago Verde EC
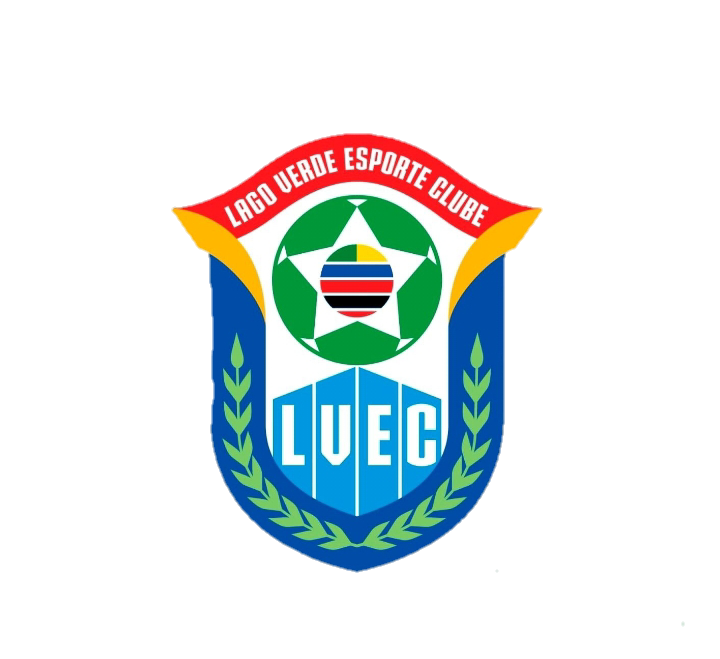
- Lago Verde EC logo
- Full name: Lago Verde Esporte Clube
- Founded: June 1, 1957
- Ground: Estádio Nhozinho Santos, São Luís, Maranhão state, Brazil
- Capacity: 12,891
Home colours	Away colours

Lago Verde Esporte Clube (formerly known as Esporte Clube Boa Vontade, or simply Boa Vontade) is a Brazilian men's and women's football club based in Maranhão state. The men's team competed once in the Série C and the women's team competed twice in the Copa do Brasil de Futebol Feminino.

The club changed its name to Lago Verde EC in May 2025, when it relocated to Lago Verde. This was announced on official Instagram and Facebook accounts.

== History ==
The club was founded on June 6, 1957. It was based in São Luís, Maranhão until it moved to Lago Verde, Maranhão in 2025.

=== Men's team ===
Boa Vontade competed in the Série C in 1995, and won the Torneio da Integração in 2005.

=== Women's team ===
The club competed in the Copa do Brasil de Futebol Feminino in 2008, when they were eliminated in the Semifinals by Sport, and in 2009, when they were eliminated in the First Round by Tiradentes.

== Honours ==
=== Women's Football ===
- Campeonato Maranhense de Futebol Feminino
  - Winners (2): 2007, 2008

== Stadium ==
Lago Verde play their home games at Estádio Nhozinho Santos. The stadium has a maximum capacity of 16,500 people.
