= 2014 Copa do Brasil de Futebol Feminino =

Tournament details
- Country: Brazil
- Teams: 32

Final positions
- Champions: (São Paulo (state)) Ferroviária
- Runners-up: (São Paulo (state)) São José

The 2014 Copa do Brasil de Futebol Feminino was the eighth staging of the competition. The competition started on January 29, 2014, and concluded on April 15, 2014. 32 clubs of all regions of Brazil participated of the cup, which was organized by the Brazilian Football Confederation (CBF).

Ferroviária won the final.

== Competition format ==
The competition was contested by 32 clubs in a knock-out format where all rounds were played over two legs and the away goals rule was used, but in the first two rounds, if the away team won the first leg with an advantage of at least three goals, the second leg was not played and the club automatically qualified to the next round.

== Table ==
Round of 32
Monamy	0
São Francisco	8
Espigão	0 0
Iranduba	1 5
Bahia	1 1
Sport	2 5
Ferroviária	14 8
União Desportiva	0 0
Botafogo-PB	0 0
Vitória das Tabocas	0 1
São Raimundo-RR	0 0
Viana	0 3
Assermurb	0
Caucaia	6
Santana	3 0
Tuna Luso	5 2
Iguaçuense	0
São José	3
Estrela Real	0
Rio Preto	6
Comercial-ES	1
Vasco	5
Atlântico	2
Kindermann	7
Jaó	1 2
ESMAC	2 2
Neves	2 2
Capital	0 2
Mixto	0 0
Duque de Caxias	1 4
Picos	5 7
Comercial-MS	0 0

Round of 16
São Francisco	3 2
Iranduba	1 1
Sport	0 0
Ferroviária	11 4
Vitória das Tabocas	1 3
Viana	2 0
Caucaia	1 1
Tuna Luso	4 0
São José (ag)	2 1
Rio Preto	3 0
Vasco	1 2
Kindermann	1 3
ESMAC	1 1
Neves	0 1
Duque de Caxias	0 3
Picos	2 2

Quarterfinals
São Francisco	3 0
Ferroviária	2 5
Vitória das Tabocas (ag)	3 2
Tuna Luso	1 4
São José	3 0
Kindermann	2 0
ESMAC	0 0
Picos	1 3

Semifinals
Picos	0 0
Ferroviária	2 3
Vitória das Tabocas	0 1
São José	1 1

Finals
Ferroviária	1 0 (5)
São José	0 1 (4)

=== Final ===
March 30

Ferroviária	1–0	São José

Fonte Luminosa, Araraquara

April 15

São José	1–0	Ferroviária
Penalties
	4–5

Estádio Joe Sanchez, São José dos Campos

2014 Copa do Brasil de Futebol Feminino

Ferroviária
Champion
First title
