= 2009 Campeonato Paulista de Futebol Feminino =

Campeonato Paulista de Futebol Feminino
- Season: 2009
- Dates: 25 April – 31 October 2009
- Champions: Botucatu
- Matches: 114
- Goals: 433 (3.8 per match)
- Top goalscorer: (Brazil) Nildinha (20 goals)
- Biggest home win: Botucatu 11–0 Paulista (10 May)
- Biggest away win: Paulista 0–11 Ferroviária (11 June)
- Highest scoring: Botucatu 11–0 Paulista (10 May, 11 goals)
- Longest winning run: Ferroviária; 7 matches
- Longest unbeaten run: Santos; 21 matches
- Longest winless run: Juventus; 10 matches
- Longest losing run: Paulista; 9 matches

2009 Campeonato Paulista de Futebol Feminino was the 17th edition of the main women's football competition in the state of São Paulo, Brazil, organised by the Federação Paulista de Futebol (FPF).

Fourteen clubs took part, with the competition beginning on 25 April and ending on 31 October. The final was contested by Santos and Botucatu over two legs. After winning the first leg 2–1 in Santos, the "Sereias da Vila" were overturned in the return leg, played in Botucatu, losing 2–0. Botucatu Futebol Clube were thus crowned champions 3–2 on aggregate, claiming the third title in the club's history, after 2006 and 2008, and their second in a row.

== Format ==
The competition was played over four stages:

1. First stage: the 14 clubs were split into two groups of seven, playing each other home and away within their group (12 rounds). The top four in each group advanced.
2. Second stage: the eight qualifiers were reshuffled into two new groups of four — mixing clubs from both first-stage groups — who again played home and away (six rounds).
3. Semi-finals: the top two of each second-stage group advanced, the winners of one group facing the runners-up of the other. Ties were played over two legs, with the return leg hosted by whichever side had the better cumulative record.
4. Final: also played over two legs, under the same rule for hosting the decisive match, which also settled ties on aggregate.

In the group stages, ties were broken, in line with the regulations used in neighbouring editions, in the following order: wins, goal difference, goals scored, head-to-head record and drawing of lots. The regulations also provided for a third-place match between the two losing semi-finalists, for a berth in the Copa do Brasil de Futebol Feminino (the champions and runners-up qualified automatically); no record of the result of that match, between Corinthians and Francana, could be found in the sources consulted.

== Participating clubs ==
| Club | City | Home ground |
|---|---|---|
| América Futebol Clube | São José do Rio Preto | Benedito Teixeira |
| Associação Desportiva Jaguariúna | Jaguariúna | Municipal Tancredo Neves |
| Ferroviária | Araraquara | Dr. Cândido de Barros |
| Botucatu Futebol Clube | Botucatu | Dr. Acrísio Paes Cruz |
| Clube Atlético Juventus | São Paulo | Conde Rodolfo Crespi |
| Francana Futebol Clube | Franca | Dr. José Lancha Filho |
| Nacional Atlético Clube | São Paulo | Nicolau Alayon |
| Paulista Futebol Clube | Jundiaí | Centro Esportivo Dr. Romão de Souza |
| Saad Esporte Clube | Águas de Lindóia | Municipal Paulo Araújo de Novaes |
| Santos Futebol Clube | Santos | CT Rei Pelé / Ulrico Mursa |
| São Bernardo Futebol Clube | São Bernardo do Campo | Municipal Güglio Portugal Pichinin |
| Esporte Clube São Bento | Sorocaba | Municipal Walter Ribeiro |
| São José Esporte Clube | São José dos Campos | Martins Pereira |
| Sport Club Corinthians Paulista | São Paulo | (various) |

== First stage ==
Clubs played each other home and away within their group. The top four in each group advanced to the second stage.

- Clubs qualified to the second stage
- Clubs eliminated

=== Group 1 ===
| Pos | Team | Pts | Pld | W | D | L | GF | GA | GD |
|---|---|---|---|---|---|---|---|---|---|
| 1 | Botucatu | 28 | 12 | 9 | 1 | 2 | 36 | 16 | +20 |
| 2 | Ferroviária | 27 | 12 | 9 | 0 | 3 | 39 | 11 | +28 |
| 3 | Francana | 25 | 12 | 8 | 1 | 3 | 27 | 9 | +18 |
| 4 | Jaguariúna | 19 | 12 | 6 | 1 | 5 | 25 | 16 | +9 |
| 5 | América | 18 | 12 | 6 | 0 | 6 | 37 | 23 | +14 |
| 6 | Saad | 4 | 12 | 1 | 1 | 10 | 15 | 33 | –18 |
| 7 | Paulista | 3 | 12 | 1 | 0 | 11 | 8 | 79 | –71 |

=== Group 2 ===
| Pos | Team | Pts | Pld | W | D | L | GF | GA | GD |
|---|---|---|---|---|---|---|---|---|---|
| 1 | Santos | 30 | 12 | 9 | 3 | 0 | 41 | 8 | +33 |
| 2 | Corinthians | 23 | 12 | 7 | 2 | 3 | 36 | 17 | +19 |
| 3 | São José | 23 | 12 | 7 | 2 | 3 | 27 | 11 | +16 |
| 4 | São Bernardo | 18 | 12 | 5 | 3 | 4 | 21 | 22 | –1 |
| 5 | Nacional | 14 | 12 | 3 | 5 | 4 | 17 | 22 | –5 |
| 6 | São Bento | 5 | 12 | 1 | 2 | 9 | 8 | 40 | –32 |
| 7 | Juventus | 4 | 12 | 1 | 1 | 10 | 12 | 42 | –30 |

Santos finished the stage unbeaten, the best record among all 14 clubs.

The eight qualifiers were reshuffled into two new groups of four, who again played each other home and away. The top two in each group advanced to the semi-finals.

- Clubs qualified to the knockout stage
- Clubs eliminated

== Second stage ==
=== Group 1 ===
| Pos | Team | Pts | Pld | W | D | L | GF | GA | GD |
|---|---|---|---|---|---|---|---|---|---|
| 1 | Botucatu | 15 | 6 | 5 | 0 | 1 | 14 | 6 | +8 |
| 2 | Corinthians | 9 | 6 | 3 | 0 | 3 | 13 | 10 | +3 |
| 3 | São José | 9 | 6 | 3 | 0 | 3 | 8 | 6 | +2 |
| 4 | Jaguariúna | 3 | 6 | 1 | 0 | 5 | 4 | 17 | –13 |

| | BOT | COR | SJO | JAG |
|---|---|---|---|---|
| Botucatu | — | 2–1 | 2–1 | 5–0 |
| Corinthians | 2–3 | — | 0–1 | 4–2 |
| São José | 2–1 | 1–2 | — | 0–1 |
| Jaguariúna | 0–1 | 1–4 | 0–3 | — |

Row = home team, column = away team. Corinthians and São José finished level on points, wins and draws; Corinthians advanced on goal difference.

=== Group 2 ===
| Pos | Team | Pts | Pld | W | D | L | GF | GA | GD |
|---|---|---|---|---|---|---|---|---|---|
| 1 | Santos | 12 | 6 | 3 | 3 | 0 | 12 | 3 | +9 |
| 2 | Francana | 9 | 6 | 2 | 3 | 1 | 5 | 5 | 0 |
| 3 | São Bernardo | 7 | 6 | 2 | 1 | 3 | 5 | 8 | –3 |
| 4 | Ferroviária | 4 | 6 | 1 | 1 | 4 | 4 | 10 | –6 |

| | SAN | FRA | SBE | FER |
|---|---|---|---|---|
| Santos | — | 0–0 | 3–0 | 4–0 |
| Francana | 1–1 | — | 1–0 | 1–0 |
| São Bernardo | 1–3 | 1–1 | — | 1–0 |
| Ferroviária | 1–1 | 3–1 | 0–2 | — |

== Knockout stage ==
Semi-finals
| Team 1 | Agg. | Team 2 | 1st leg | 2nd leg |
|---|---|---|---|---|
| Francana | 2–3 | Botucatu | 0–2 | 2–1 |
| Corinthians | 3–6 | Santos | 2–2 | 1–4 |

Botucatu, who had finished top of Group 1, advanced despite losing the return leg, having built a two-goal cushion in the first. Santos, the stronger side of the second stage, put four past Corinthians in the return leg in Santos to seal a 6–3 aggregate win.

Final
| Team 1 | Agg. | Team 2 | 1st leg | 2nd leg |
|---|---|---|---|---|
| Santos | 2–3 | Botucatu | 2–1 | 0–2 |

The first leg was played on 24 October at Ulrico Mursa, in Santos; the return leg on 31 October at Dr. Acrísio Paes Cruz, in Botucatu. Despite losing the first leg, Botucatu had the better combined record across both group stages and so hosted the decider, which they won 2–0 to take the title 3–2 on aggregate.

== Honours ==
2009 Campeonato Paulista de Futebol Feminino
Botucatu Futebol Clube
(3rd title)

== Statistics ==
=== Top scorers ===
| Pos. | Player | Team | Goals |
|---|---|---|---|
| 1 | Nildinha | Corinthians | 20 |
| 2 | Grazielle | Botucatu | 17 |
| 3 | Maurine | Santos | 15 |
| 4 | Daniela | Botucatu | 11 |
| 4 | Beatriz | Ferroviária | 11 |
| 6 | Raquel | América | 10 |
| 6 | Alanna | Ferroviária | 10 |
| 6 | Luize | São José | 10 |
| 9 | Rita de Cássia | Jaguariúna | 9 |
| 9 | Darlane | América | 9 |
| 9 | Giovania | Francana | 9 |
| 12 | Almirene | Santos | 8 |
| 12 | Ketlen | Santos | 8 |
| 12 | Renata | São José | 8 |
