= Campeonato Piauiense de Futebol Feminino =

Women's football league in Piauí, Brazil

- Founded: 2008
- Country: Brazil
- Confederation: FFP
- Promotion to: Brasileiro Série A3
- Current champions: Liga São João (1st title) (2025)
- Most championships: Tiradentes (10 titles)
- Current: 2026

The Campeonato Piauiense de Futebol Feminino is the women's football state championship of Piauí, and is contested since 2008.

== List of champions ==
Following is the list with all recognized titles of Campeonato Piauiense Feminino:

Season	Champions	Runners-up
2008	Tiradentes (1)	
2009	Tiradentes (2)	
2010	Tiradentes (3)	
2011	Flamengo (1)	Tiradentes
2012	Tiradentes (4)	Flamengo
2013	Picos (1)	
2014	Abelhas Rainhas (1)	
2015	Tiradentes (5)	AE São Paulo
2016	Not held	
2017	Tiradentes (6)	Abelhas Rainhas
2018	Tiradentes (7)	Teresina
2019	Tiradentes (8)	Teresina
2020	Not held due COVID-19 pandemic in Brazil	
2021	Teresina (1)	Abelhas Rainhas
2022	Tiradentes (9)	Piauí
2023	Tiradentes (10)	Abelhas Rainhas
2024	Atlético Piauiense (1)	Tiradentes
2025	Liga São João (1)	Atlético Piauiense

== Titles by team ==
Teams in bold stills active.

Rank	Club	Winners	Winning years
1	**Tiradentes**	10	2008, 2009, 2010, 2012, 2015, 2017, 2018, 2019, 2022, 2023
2	**Abelhas Rainhas**	1	2014
2	**Atlético Piauiense**	1	2024
2	Flamengo	1	2011
2	Picos	1	2013
2	**Teresina**	1	2021
2	**Liga São João**	1	2025

=== By city ===
City	Championships	Clubs
Teresina	13	Tiradentes (10), Atlético Piauiense (1), Flamengo (1), Teresina (1)
Picos	2	Abelhas Rainhas (1), Picos (1)
São João do Piauí	1	Liga São João (1)
