= Women's football in Brazil =

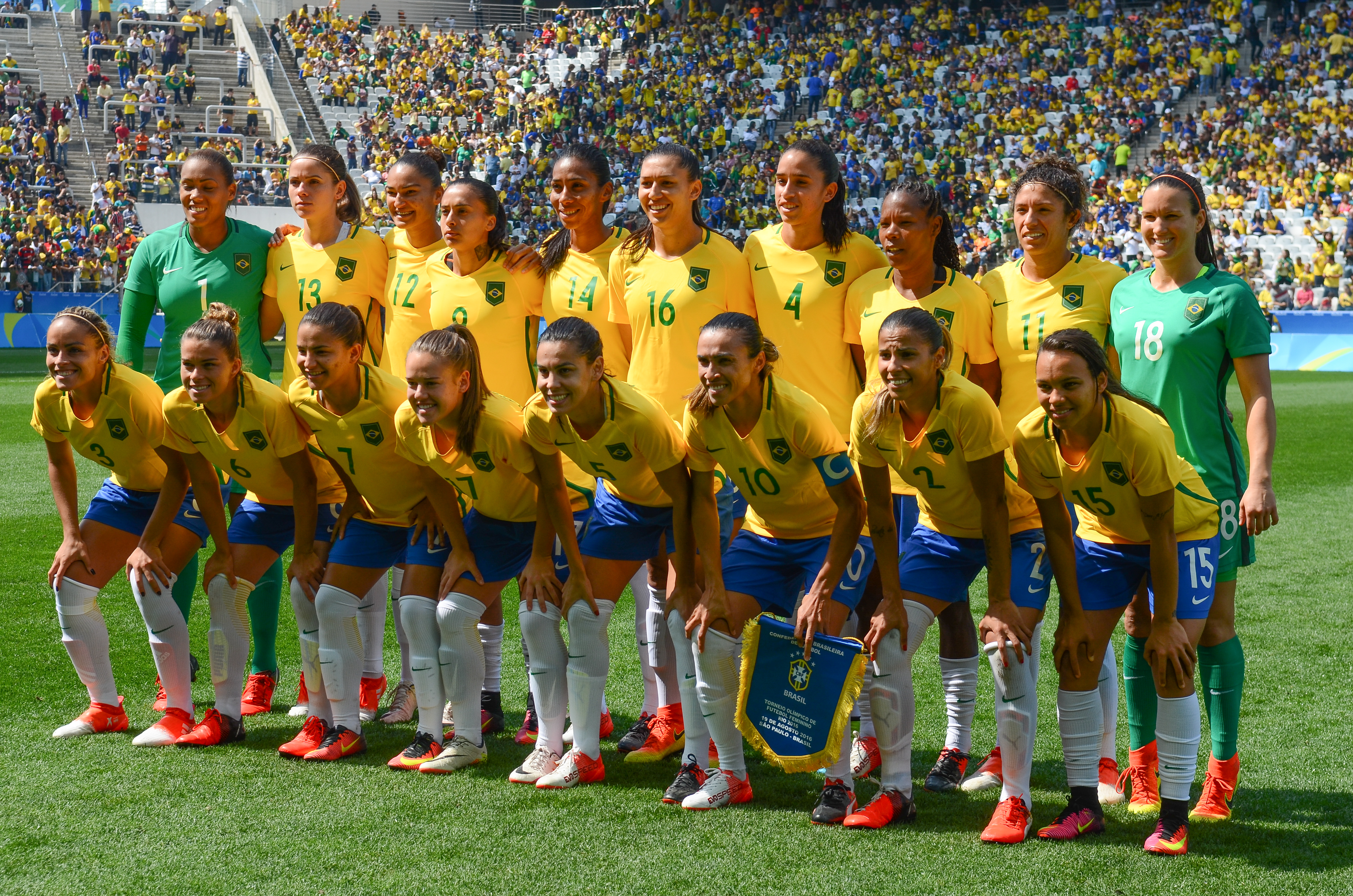
- Country: Brazil
- Governing body: Confederação Brasileira de Futebol
- National team: Women's national team

National competitions
- Campeonato Brasileiro de Futebol Feminino Série A1

International competitions
- Olympics; FIFA Women's World Cup (National Team); Copa América Femenina (National Team)

Women's football is not as popular in Brazil as men's football, although it has increased in popularity since the 2000s.

== History ==
Due to strong and continuing social stigma, Brazilian society only minimally supports women's football. There is a sexist belief in the country that football is not a sport for women. It was illegal for women to play football in Brazil from 1941 to 1979. Until recently, the country lacked a national women's league, organizing only state competitions because there was limited financial interest and support for the women's game. This absence of support was also in the form of low media coverage and sponsorships, further perpetuating the female football players' struggle for recognition in Brazil.The Copa do Brasil de Futebol Feminino was first played in 2007. In 2013, a nationwide league, the Campeonato Brasileiro de Futebol Feminino Série A1, was officially started and became the country's premier women's domestic competition, helping to increase the quality of Brazilian women's football. Despite all issues, Brazilian clubs have won most editions of the Copa Libertadores Femenina (11).

Women's football in Brazil only recently became more popular. During the 20th century, women were discouraged from playing "masculine" sports such as football and told they should focus more on aesthetic sports such as gymnastics. During this time, women were expected to conform to social norms and play the role of caregivers. Supporting this was the idea that playing football was dangerous for women as it could harm their bodies, especially their reproductive organs. As a result, the length of matches was reduced and smaller balls were used solely for the women's football. Health experts in Brazil at the time even claimed that females playing these sports were at risk of becoming homosexual. It was believed that the sport encouraged acts that were not deemed as morally acceptable for women, such as changing out of jerseys and exchanging them on the field. It was also suspected that allowing the women to undress in front of each other in changing rooms would encourage homosexual relationships among teammates. At a very young age, young boys were taught to be strong while girls were taught how to become better mothers. Women were often bullied for playing football and forced to leave fields in order to make more time for men to play. Despite the social challenges, women still continued to play football as officials worried about the masculinization of the female body and how detrimental that would be to their society. These fears sparked President Getúlio Vargas to organize a national sports council to establish sports guidelines. The council proceeded to ban women from playing any aggressive sports such as football due to health precautions. Many female players resisted this ban; Primavera FC continued to play up until they ran out of funding and resources. This law was not strictly upheld as some women continued to play. In the 1970's women's football was gaining popularity across the world; this inspired several feminist protests in Brazil. Eventually the ban on women's football in Brazil was finally lifted in 1983, influenced by the Union of European Football Associations.

The best players, such as Marta and Cristiane, were discovered and directly invited to play for the Brazilian national team. In recent years, the national team has contested World Cup finals and Olympics gold medals, increasing the popularity of TV broadcasts for those tournaments. However, this was not sufficient to stimulate the footballing culture among women who prefer to support men's football over women's. Brazil has developed a major rivalry with the United States women's national soccer team.

In the 2014 FIFA World Cup, the Brazilian men's team only made fourth place. This led to support for the women's team, with hopes that they could win the 2015 FIFA Women's World Cup. However, the women's team failed to advance past the first round of the knockout stage.

From 2020, Brazilian female footballers will receive equal pay, a major step in the development of women's football in the nation.

== Current system ==
- Série A
- Série A2
- Série A3

== Domestic cups ==
- Copa do Brasil
- Supercopa do Brasil de Futebol Feminino

== State championships ==
- Rio de Janeiro
- São Paulo

== State cups ==
- Copa Paulista de Futebol Feminino

== See also ==
- Football in Brazil
- Brazil women's national football team
- Bans of women's association football
