= 2013 Copa do Brasil de Futebol Feminino =

Tournament details
- Country: Brazil
- Teams: 31

Final positions
- Champions: (São Paulo (state)) São José
- Runners-up: (Pernambuco) Vitória-PE

The 2013 Copa do Brasil de Futebol Feminino was the seventh staging of the competition. The competition started on February 2, 2013, and concluded on May 4, 2013. 32 clubs of all regions of Brazil participated of the cup, which is organized by the Brazilian Football Confederation (CBF).

== Competition format ==
The competition was contested by 32 clubs in a knock-out format where all rounds were played over two legs and the away goals rule was used, but in the first three rounds, if the away team won the first leg with an advantage of at least three goals, the second leg would not be played and the club automatically qualified to the next round.

== Table ==
First round
CESMAC	0
Vitória-PE	9
Assermurb	0 1
Caucaia	2 4
Kashima	1 0
Sport	0 5
Atlético Roraima	0 2
Iranduba	2 2
Tiradentes	0
São Francisco	3
Sergipe	-
Força e Luz	-
Calçoene	0 0
ESMAC	1 6
Internacional Tutuiga	5 12
Genus	0 0
Serra	1 0
São José	3 5
CRESSPOM	6 5
Nacional-MG	1 1
Clube Jaó	1
Duque de Caxias	4
Comercial-ES	0 0
AD Iguaçuense	1 0
Novo Mundo	1 0
Centro Olímpico	2 1
Cruzeiro-RS	0
Portuguesa	5
Intercap	1 0
Vasco	2 2
Comercial-MS	0
Kindermann	7

Round of 16
Vitória-PE	2 2
Caucaia	0 2
Sport	2 2
Iranduba	1 0
São Francisco	2 6
Força e Luz	0 0
ESMAC	0 0
Internacional Tutuiga	0 2
São José	1 4
CRESSPOM	1 0
Duque de Caxias	3 0
AD Iguaçuense	0 0
Centro Olímpico	6
Portuguesa	0
Vasco	1 1
Kindermann	0 5

Quarterfinals
Vitória-PE	1 2
Sport	0 0
São Francisco	1 2
Internacional Tutuiga	1 2
São José	3 4
Duque de Caxias	2 2
Centro Olímpico	6 3
Kindermann	0 1

Semifinals
Vitória-PE	1 1
Centro Olímpico	1 0
São José	3 3
São Francisco	0 0

Final
Vitória-PE	1 0
São José	1 4

1. Sergipe withdrew the competition.

=== Final ===
April 27
10:00 (UTC−03:00)

Vitória-PE	1–1	São José
Ketlen 64' (pen.)		Dani 87'

Carneirão, Vitória de Santo Antão
Attendance: 540
Referee: Ana Karina M. Alves (Pernambuco)

May 4
10:00 (UTC−03:00)

São José	4–0	Vitória-PE
Formiga 3'; Priscilinha 32'; Giovânia 69'; Dani 89'

Estádio Martins Pereira, São José dos Campos
Attendance: 1,987
Referee: Regildênia de Holanda Moura (São Paulo)

2013 Copa do Brasil de Futebol Feminino

São José
Champion
Second title
