= Foz do Iguaçu Futebol Clube =

Brazilian football club

Foz do Iguaçu
- Full name: Auritânia Foz do Iguaçu Futebol Clube
- Nickname: O Azulão da Fronteira
- Founded: 9 February 1996; 30 years ago
- Ground: Estádio do ABC
- Capacity: 12,000
- President: Arif Osman
- Head coach: Negreiros
- League: Campeonato Paranaense
- 2025: Paranaense Série Prata, 2nd of 10 (promoted)
Home colors	Away colors

Foz do Iguaçu Futebol Clube, simply known as Foz do Iguaçu or just Foz, is a professional football club based in Foz do Iguaçu, Paraná, Brazil. The team was founded on 9 February 1996, and has blue and white as their main colors. Playing at the Estádio do ABC, which has the capacity for 7,000 spectators, they are currently competing in the Campeonato Paranaense, the state of Paraná first division. Foz do Iguaçu women's team once competed in the Copa do Brasil de Futebol Feminino (Women's football brazilian cup).

== History ==
Foz do Iguaçu Futebol Clube was founded on 9 February 1996.

The women's team finished as runners-up in the 2010 Copa do Brasil de Futebol Feminino.

== Honours ==
=== Official tournaments ===
State
Competitions	Titles	Seasons
Campeonato Paranaense Série Prata	1	2022
