= 2007 Copa do Brasil de Futebol Feminino =

Tournament details
- Country: Brazil
- Teams: 32

Final positions
- Champions: (Mato Grosso do Sul) MS/Saad
- Runners-up: (São Paulo (state)) Botucatu

Tournament statistics
- Matches played: 68
- Goals scored: 246 (3.62 per match)
- Top goal scorer: Daniela Alves (MS/Saad) - 14 goals

The 2007 Copa do Brasil de Futebol Feminino was the first staging of the competition and was played from October 30 to December 9, 2007. 32 clubs of all regions of Brazil participated of the cup, which was organized by the Brazilian Football Confederation (CBF). The champion was Mato Grosso do Sul/Saad.

== Competition format ==
32 clubs, selected by their respective state federations, participated of the Copa do Brasil de Futebol Feminino 2007.

The 32 clubs were divided in 6 pools (A/B/C/D/E/F), according to their regions.

- A and B: North and Northeast regions
- C: Central-West region
- D: Southern region
- E and F: Southeast region

The first three stages were two-legged knockout matches, but the clubs of the groups C, D, E and F did not play the third stage. The winners of each pool plus the two clubs with the best record among the third stage eliminated teams of the groups 22, 23 and 24, and 25 and 26 qualified to the fourth stage.

In the fourth stage, the four teams were divided in two groups of four teams each, playing against the other teams of their groups once. The matches were played at Mané Garrincha, Brasília and Boca do Jacaré, Taguatinga, Distrito Federal.

Group 27	Group 28
Group 21 winner	Group 22 winner
Group 23 winner	Group 24 winner
Group 25 winner	Group 26 winner
second club with the best record among the third stage eliminated teams of the groups 22, 23 and 24.	second club with the best record among the third stage eliminated teams of the groups 25 and 26.

The two best clubs of each group qualified to the semifinals, and the semifinals winners played the final on December 9, at Estádio Mané Garrincha, Brasília.

=== Ranking criteria ===
If the teams were level on points, they were ranked on the following criteria in order:

1. Greatest total goal difference;
2. Greatest number of goals scored as a visitor;.
3. Penalty shootout.

== Participating teams ==
The 2007 participating teams were the following clubs:

- AJA (São Paulo)
- Santos (São Paulo)
- Botucatu (São Paulo)
- America (Rio de Janeiro)
- Vasco (Rio de Janeiro)
- Juventude (Rio Grande do Sul)
- Internacional (Rio Grande do Sul)
- Nacional (Minas Gerais)
- Benfica (Minas Gerais)
- São José (Paraná)
- Sport Recife (Pernambuco)
- São Francisco do Conde (Bahia)
- Aliança (Goiás)
- Scorpions (Santa Catarina)
- Horizonte (Ceará)
- Independente (Pará)
- CESMAC (Alagoas)
- ABC (Rio Grande do Norte)
- Internacional (Maranhão)
- Desportiva Capixaba (Espírito Santo)
- CRESSPOM (Distrito Federal)
- Rio Negro (Amazonas)
- Mato Grosso do Sul/Saad (Mato Grosso do Sul)
- River Plate (Paraíba)
- CEPE (Sergipe)
- Tiradentes (Piauí)
- Mixto (Mato Grosso)
- Andirá (Acre)
- Genus (Rondônia)
- Gurupi (Tocantins)
- Rio Norte (Amapá)
- Baré (Roraima)

== Table ==
=== First stage ===
Pool	Group	Team #1	Score	Team #2	Stadium/City	
Pool	Group	Team #1	Score	Team #2	1st Match	2nd Match
A	1	(Roraima) Baré	October 30: 0-0; November 2: 2-3 aggregate: 2-3	(Amazonas (Brazilian state)) Rio Negro	Ribeirão (Roraima) Boa Vista	Vivaldo Lima (Amazonas (Brazilian state)) Manaus
A	2	(Rondônia) Genus	October 30: 3-0; November 2: 3-0 aggregate: 6-0	(Acre (state)) Andirá	Aluízio Ferreira (Rondônia) Porto Velho	Arena da Floresta (Acre (state)) Rio Branco
A	3	(Amapá) Rio Norte	October 30: 1-2; November 2: 3-1 aggregate: 4-3	(Pará) Independente	Glicério Marques (Amapá) Macapá	Mangueirão (Pará) Belém
A	4	(Tocantins) Gurupi	October 30: 0-2; November 2: 0-0 aggregate: 0-2	(Maranhão) Internacional	Resende Rocha (Tocantins) Gurupi	Nhozinho Santos (Maranhão) São Luís
B	5	(Sergipe) CEPE	October 30: 0-1; November 2: 2-8 aggregate: 2-9	(Bahia) São Francisco	Presidente Médici (Sergipe) Itabaiana	Junqueira Ayres (Bahia) S.F. do Conde
B	6	(Alagoas) CESMAC	October 30: 0-5; November 2: 1-3 aggregate: 1-8	(Pernambuco) Sport	Nelson Feijó (Alagoas) Maceió	Ilha do Retiro (Pernambuco) Recife
B	7	(Paraíba) River Plate	October 30: 0-1; November 2: 0-6 aggregate: 0-7	(Rio Grande do Norte) ABC	Sílvio Porto (Paraíba) Guarabira	Frasqueirão (Rio Grande do Norte) Natal
B	8	(Piauí) Tiradentes	October 30: 2-0; November 2: 3-0 aggregate: 5-0	(Ceará) Horizonte	Alberto Silva (Piauí) Teresina	Clenilsão (Ceará) Horizonte
C	9	(Mato Grosso) Mixto	November 2: 2-0; November 8: 2-3 aggregate: 4-3	(Goiás) Aliança	Presidente Dutra (Mato Grosso) Cuiabá	Antônio Accioly (Goiás) Goiânia
C	10	(Mato Grosso do Sul) MS/SAAD	November 2: 2-0; November 8: 7-1 aggregate: 9-1	(Federal District (Brazil)) CRESSPOM	Morenão (Mato Grosso do Sul) Campo Grande	CAVE (Federal District (Brazil)) Guará
D	11	(Rio Grande do Sul) Juventude	November 2: 1-1; November 8: 0-0 aggregate: 1-1¹	(Rio Grande do Sul) Internacional	Alfredo Jaconi (Rio Grande do Sul) Caxias do Sul	Beira Rio (Rio Grande do Sul) Porto Alegre
D	12	(Santa Catarina (state)) Scorpions	November 2: 0-7; November 8: 1-5 aggregate:1-12	(Paraná (state)) São José	Orlando Scarpelli (Santa Catarina (state)) Florianópolis	Pinhão (Paraná (state)) São José dos Pinhais
E	13	(Espírito Santo) Desportiva	November 2: 2-1; November 8: 0-4 aggregate: 2-5	(Minas Gerais) Nacional	Engenheiro Araripe (Espírito Santo) Cariacica	Frimisa (Minas Gerais) Santa Luzia
E	14	(Minas Gerais) Benfica	November 2: 3-2; November 8: 5-1 aggregate: 8-3	(Rio de Janeiro (state)) Vasco da Gama	Mario Helênio (Minas Gerais) Juiz de Fora	São Januário (Rio de Janeiro (state)) Rio de Janeiro
F	15	(São Paulo (state)) Botucatu	November 2: 0-0; November 8: 2-1 aggregate: 2-1	(São Paulo (state)) Santos	Arísio Paes Cruz (São Paulo (state)) Botucatu	Vila Belmiro (São Paulo (state)) Santos
F	16	(Rio de Janeiro (state)) America	November 2: 1-1; November 8: 2-0 aggregate: 3-1	(São Paulo (state)) AJA	Giulitte Coutinho (Rio de Janeiro (state)) Mesquita	Azulão (São Paulo (state)) Jaguariúna

¹ Internacional qualified due to the away goals rule.

=== Second stage ===
Pool	Group	Team #1	Score	Team #2	Stadium/City	
Pool	Group	Team #1	Score	Team #2	1st Match	2nd Match
A	17	(Rondônia) Genus	November 9: 4-1; November 13: 3-3 aggregate: 7-4	(Amazonas (Brazilian state)) Rio Negro	Aluízio Ferreira (Rondônia) Porto Velho	Vivaldo Lima (Amazonas (Brazilian state)) Manaus
A	18	(Amapá) Rio Norte	November 8: 1-2; November 13: 2-2 aggregate: 3-4	(Maranhão) Internacional	Glicério Marques (Amapá) Macapá	Nhozinho Santos (Maranhão) São Luís
B	19	(Bahia) São Francisco	November 8: 0-0; November 13: 2-1 aggregate: 2-1	(Pernambuco) Sport	Junqueira Ayres (Bahia) S.F. do Conde	Ilha do Retiro (Pernambuco) Recife
B	20	(Piauí) Tiradentes	November 8: 4-1; November 13: 4-3 aggregate: 8-4	(Rio Grande do Norte) ABC	Alberto Silva (Piauí) Teresina	Frasqueirão (Rio Grande do Norte) Natal
C	21	(Mato Grosso) Mixto	November 15: 0-4; November 22: 1-4 aggregate: 1-8	(Mato Grosso do Sul) MS/SAAD	Verdão (Mato Grosso) Cuiabá	Morenão (Mato Grosso do Sul) Campo Grande
D	22	(Paraná (state)) São José	November 15: 2-1; November 22: 1-0 aggregate: 3-1	(Rio Grande do Sul) Internacional	Pinhão (Paraná (state)) São José dos Pinhais	Beira Rio (Rio Grande do Sul) Porto Alegre
E	23	(Minas Gerais) Nacional	November 15: 0-5; November 22: 1-7 aggregate: 1-12	(Minas Gerais) Benfica	Frimisa (Minas Gerais) Santa Luzia	Mario Helênio (Minas Gerais) Juiz de Fora
F	24	(Rio de Janeiro (state)) America	November 15: 1-1; November 22: 0-1 aggregate: 1-2	(São Paulo (state)) Botucatu	Giulite Coutinho (Rio de Janeiro (state)) Mesquita	Acrísio Paes Cruz (São Paulo (state)) Botucatu

=== Third stage ===
Pool	Group	Team #1	Score	Team #2	Stadium/City	
Pool	Group	Team #1	Score	Team #2	1st Match	2nd Match
A	25	(Rondônia) Genus	November 22: 3-0; November 26: 1-0 aggregate: 4-0	(Maranhão) Internacional	Aluízio Ferreira (Rondônia) Porto Velho	Nhozinho Santos (Maranhão) São Luís
B	26	(Piauí) Tiradentes	November 22: 1-3; November 26: 1-1 aggregate: 2-4	(Bahia) São Francisco	Alberto Silva (Piauí) Teresina	Junqueira Ayres (Bahia) S.F. do Conde

=== Fourth stage ===
==== Group 27 ====
Position	Team	Pts	Pld	W	D	L	GF	GA	GD
1	(Mato Grosso do Sul) MS/Saad	7	3	2	1	0	16	2	+14
2	(Minas Gerais) Benfica	7	3	2	1	0	15	2	+13
3	(Rio de Janeiro (state)) America	3	3	1	0	2	3	5	-2
4	(Rondônia) Genus	0	3	0	0	3	1	26	-25

Pos.	Qualified to the Semifinals
Pos.	Eliminated from the competition

Group	Round	Team 1	Score	Team 2	Stadium/City
27	1st	(Minas Gerais) Benfica	November 29: 1-0	(Rio de Janeiro (state)) America	Mané Garrincha (Federal District (Brazil)) Brasília
27	1st	(Mato Grosso do Sul) MS/Saad	November 29: 11-0	(Rondônia) Genus	Mané Garrincha (Federal District (Brazil)) Brasília
27	2nd	(Rio de Janeiro (state)) America	December 1: 0-3	(Mato Grosso do Sul) MS/Saad	Mané Garrincha (Federal District (Brazil)) Brasília
27	2nd	(Rondônia) Genus	December 1: 0-12	(Minas Gerais) Benfica	Mané Garrincha (Federal District (Brazil)) Brasília
27	3rd	(Mato Grosso do Sul) MS/Saad	December 4: 2-2	(Minas Gerais) Benfica	Mané Garrincha (Federal District (Brazil)) Brasília
27	3rd	(Rondônia) Genus	December 4: 1-3	(Rio de Janeiro (state)) America	Boca do Jacaré (Federal District (Brazil)) Taguatinga

(*) America qualified to the fourth stage because it had the best record among the third stage eliminated teams of the groups 22, 23 and 24.

==== Group 28 ====
Position	Team	Pts	Pld	W	D	L	GF	GA	GD
1	(São Paulo (state)) Botucatu	9	3	3	0	0	8	1	+7
2	(Bahia) São Francisco	3	3	1	0	2	4	5	-1
3	(Piauí) Tiradentes	3	3	1	0	2	3	5	-2
4	(Paraná (state)) São José	3	3	1	0	2	2	5	-4

Pos.	Qualified to the Semifinals
Pos.	Eliminated from the competition

Group	Round	Team 1	Score	Team 2	Stadium/City
28	1st	(Paraná (state)) São José	November 29: 1-3	(Bahia) São Francisco	Boca do Jacaré (Federal District (Brazil)) Taguatinga
28	1st	(São Paulo (state)) Botucatu	November 29: 3-1	(Piauí) Tiradentes	Boca do Jacaré (Federal District (Brazil)) Taguatinga
28	2nd	(Bahia) São Francisco	December 1: 0-2	(São Paulo (state)) Botucatu	Boca do Jacaré (Federal District (Brazil)) Taguatinga
28	2nd	(Piauí) Tiradentes	December 1: 0-1	(Paraná (state)) São José	Boca do Jacaré (Federal District (Brazil)) Taguatinga
28	3rd	(Paraná (state)) São José	December 4: 0-3	(São Paulo (state)) Botucatu	Boca do Jacaré (Federal District (Brazil)) Taguatinga
28	3rd	(Bahia) São Francisco	December 4: 1-2	(Piauí) Tiradentes	Mané Garrincha (Federal District (Brazil)) Brasília

(*) Tiradentes qualified to the fourth stage because it had the best record among the third stage eliminated teams of the groups 25 and 26.

=== Final stage ===
Semifinals
29 - December 6, Mané Garrincha, (Federal District (Brazil)) Brasília
(Mato Grosso do Sul) MS/Saad	6
(Bahia) São Francisco	0
30 - December 6, Boca do Jacaré, (Federal District (Brazil)) Taguatinga
(São Paulo (state)) Botucatu	0 (7)
(Minas Gerais) Benfica	0 (6)

Final
32 - December 8, Mané Garrincha, (Federal District (Brazil)) Brasília
(Mato Grosso do Sul) MS/Saad	1 (5)
(São Paulo (state)) Botucatu	1 (4)
3rd Place
31 - December 8, Mané Garrincha, (Federal District (Brazil)) Brasília
(Bahia) São Francisco	2 (5)
(Minas Gerais) Benfica	2 (3)

=== Semifinals ===
December 6, 2007
21:00

MS/Saad (Mato Grosso do Sul)	6 – 0	(Bahia) São Francisco
Andréia 6' 84'; Daniela Alves 18' 45'; Roseli 81'; Elaine Magrão 89'

Estádio Mané Garrincha, Brasília
Referee: Sérgio Carvalho (Federal District (Brazil)) DF

December 6, 2007
18:30

Botucatu (São Paulo (state))	0 – 0	(Minas Gerais) Benfica
Penalties
	7–6

Estádio Mané Garrincha, Brasília
Referee: Elmo Resende (Goiás) GO

=== Third-place playoff ===
December 8, 2007
15:30

São Francisco (Bahia)	2 – 2	(Minas Gerais) Benfica
Cisne 11' 41'		Caneca 26'; Kell 31'
Penalties
Paty: Rafaelle: Alana: Gina; Titica	5–3	Kelly:

Estádio Mané Garrincha, Brasília
Referee: Ana Carina Alves (Pernambuco) PE

=== Final ===
December 8, 2007
18:10

MS/Saad (Mato Grosso do Sul)	1 – 1	Botucatu (São Paulo (state))
Daniela Alves 72'		Rafinha 65'
Penalties
	5–4

Estádio Mané Garrincha, Brasília
Referee: Elmo Resende (Goiás) GO

Copa do Brasil de Futebol Feminino 2007

MATO GROSSO DO SUL / SAAD
Champion
First title
