= Nilda =

Brazilian footballer

Personal information
- Full name: Nilda Ismael do Nascimento
- Date of birth: 25 March 1972 (age 54)
- Place of birth: Brazil
- Position: Midfielder

Senior career*
Years	Team	Apps	(Gls)
1996	Saad EC		
2010	Hammarby IF DFF	4	(0)

International career
1996	Brazil		
- * Club domestic league appearances and goals

Nilda Ismael do Nascimento (born 25 March 1972), commonly known as Nilda or Nildinha, is a Brazilian former football midfielder who played for the Brazil women's national football team.

She represented Brazil at the 1996 Summer Olympics, but did not play. At the club level, she played for Saad EC and Swedish club Hammarby IF DFF. She was the top scorer in the 2009 São Paulo Women's Soccer Championship with 20 goals.

== See also ==
- Brazil at the 1996 Summer Olympics
