= Campeonato Pernambucano de Futebol Feminino =

Women's football league in Pernambuco, Brazil

- Founded: 1999
- Country: Brazil
- Confederation: FPF
- Promotion to: Brasileiro Série A3
- Current champions: Sport Recife (11th title) (2024)
- Most championships: Sport Recife (11 titles)
- Current: 2024

The Campeonato Pernambucano de Futebol Feminino is the women's football state championship of Pernambuco State, and is contested since 1999.

== List of champions ==
Following is the list with all recognized titles of Campeonato Pernambucano Feminino:

Season	Champions	Runners-up
1999	Sport Recife (1)	Santa Cruz
2000	Sport Recife (2)	Náutico
2001–2004	Not held	
2005	Náutico (1)	Sport Recife
2006	Náutico (2)	Barreirense
2007	Sport Recife (3)	Náutico
2008	Sport Recife (4)	Barreirense
2009	Sport Recife (5)	Náutico
2010	Vitória (1)	Sport Recife
2011	Vitória (2)	Sport Recife
2012	Vitória (3)	Sport Recife
2013	Vitória (4)	Sport Recife
2014	Vitória (5)	Sport Recife
2015	Vitória (6)	Náutico
2016	Vitória (7)	Jóias Raras
2017	Sport Recife (6)	Vitória
2018	Sport Recife (7)	Náutico
2019	Vitória (8)	Sport Recife
2020	Náutico (3)	Sport Recife
2021	Náutico (4)	Sport Recife
2022	Sport Recife (8)	Náutico
2023	Sport Recife (9)	Náutico
2024	Sport Recife (10)	Ipojuca
2025	Sport Recife (11)	Ipojuca

== Titles by team ==
Teams in bold stills active.

Rank	Club	Winners	Winning years
1	**Sport Recife**	11	1999, 2000, 2007, 2008, 2009, 2017, 2018, 2022, 2023, 2024, 2025
2	**Vitória**	8	2010, 2011, 2012, 2013, 2014, 2015, 2016, 2019
3	**Náutico**	4	2005, 2006, 2020, 2021

=== By city ===
City	Championships	Clubs
Recife	15	Sport (11), Náutico (4)
Vitória de Santo Antão	8	Vitória (8)
