= 2008 Copa do Brasil de Futebol Feminino =

Tournament details
- Country: Brazil
- Teams: 32

Final positions
- Champions: (São Paulo (state)) Santos
- Runners-up: (Pernambuco) Sport

Tournament statistics
- Matches played: 56
- Goals scored: 206 (3.68 per match)
- Top goal scorer: Luciléia (Kindermann) - 8 goals

The 2008 Copa do Brasil de Futebol Feminino was the second staging of the competition. The competition started on 1 November 2008, and was concluded on 10 December 2008. 32 clubs of all regions of Brazil participated of the cup, which is organized by the Brazilian Football Confederation (CBF). The champion was Santos.

== Competition format ==
The competition was contested by 32 clubs in a knock-out format where all rounds were played over two legs and the away goals rule was used, but in the first round if the away team won the first leg with an advantage of at least two goals, the second leg was not played and the club automatically qualified to the next round.

== Participating teams ==
The 2008 participating teams are the following clubs:

- Saad (São Paulo)
- Santos (São Paulo)
- Corinthians (São Paulo)
- Campo Grande (Rio de Janeiro)
- Volta Redonda (Rio de Janeiro)
- Juventude (Rio Grande do Sul)
- Pelotas (Rio Grande do Sul)
- Iguaçu (Minas Gerais)
- Atlético Mineiro (Minas Gerais)
- Novo Mundo (Paraná)
- Sport (Pernambuco)
- Lusaca (Bahia)
- Aliança (Goiás)
- Kindermann (Santa Catarina)
- Caucaia (Ceará)
- Sacramenta (Pará)

- Parnamirim (Rio Grande do Norte)
- Cesmac (Alagoas)
- Cresspom (Distrito Federal)
- Desportiva Capixaba (Espírito Santo)
- Boa Vontade (Maranhão)
- Portuguesa-PB (Paraíba)
- Moreninhas (Mato Grosso do Sul)
- Nilton Lins (Amazonas)
- Boca Júnior-SE (Sergipe)
- Tiradentes (Piauí)
- Tangará (Mato Grosso)
- Assermurb (Acre)
- Genus (Rondônia)
- Atenas (Tocantins)
- Rio Norte (Amapá)
- São Raimundo-RR (Roraima)

== Table ==
1st Round
São Raimundo-RR	0
Nilton Lins	4
Genus	4 2
Assermurb	1 2
Rio Norte	0 1
Sacramenta	2 8
Atenas	1 1
Boa Vontade	2 5
Cesmac	2 0 (pen: 4)
Lusaca	0 2 (pen: 3)
Boca Júnior-SE	1 0
Parnamirim	2 3
Portuguesa-PB	0
Sport	4
Tiradentes	6 0
Caucaia	4 0
Cresspom	0 3
Aliança	2 3
Tangará	1
Moreninhas	5
Novo Mundo	3 0
Juventude	1 0
Kindermann	5 3
Pelotas	0 0
Iguaçu	1
Corinthians	5
Volta Redonda	0
Saad	3
Atlético Mineiro	2 4
Campo Grande	2 0
Desportiva Capixaba	0
Santos	5

2nd Round
Nilton Lins	1 4
Genus	1 0
Sacramenta	1 1
Boa Vontade	2 1
Cesmac	1 1
Parnamirim	1 2
Sport	5 4
Tiradentes	1 2
Aliança	2 3
Moreninhas	3 1
Novo Mundo	0 3
Kindermann	3 3
Corinthians	0 2
Saad	1 0
Atlético Mineiro	0 1
Santos	3 3

Quarterfinals
Nilton Lins	2 0
Boa Vontade	1 0
Parnamirim	1 0
Sport	1 3
Aliança	0 0
Kindermann	6 3
Saad	1 1
Santos	3 2

Semifinals
Boa Vontade	0 2
Sport	4 3
Kindermann	0 0
Santos	3 3

Finals
Sport	1 0
Santos	3 3

=== Semifinals ===
Group 29

December 6, 2008
16:00

Boa Vontade (Maranhão)	0 – 4	Sport (Pernambuco)
	(Report)	Jaci 6'; Luana 63'; Amanda 75', 83'

Estádio Nhozinho Santos, São Luis
Referee: Antônio Santos Nunes (Piauí) PI

December 10, 2008
16:00

Sport (Pernambuco)	3 – 1	Boa Vontade (Maranhão)
Charrila 7', 41'; Suzana 33'	(Report)	Simone 50'

Estádio Ilha do Retiro, Recife
Referee: José Renato Albuquerque Soares (Paraíba) PB

Group 30

December 7, 2008
16:00

Kindermann (Santa Catarina (state))	0 – 3	Santos (São Paulo (state))
	(Report)	Suzana 15'; Weimer 65'; Ketlen 76'

Estádio Carlos A. C. Neves, Caçador
Referee: Frederika M. de Jaeger (Paraná (state)) PR

December 10, 2008
16:00

Santos (São Paulo (state))	3 – 0	Kindermann (Santa Catarina (state))
Pikena 30'; Weimer 61', 63'	(Report)

Estádio Ulrico Mursa, Santos
Referee: Simone Xavier de Paula e Silva (Rio de Janeiro (state)) RJ

=== Final ===
December 14, 2008
15:00

Sport (Pernambuco)	1 – 3	Santos (São Paulo (state))
Fabi 68'	(Report)	Suzana 3' 90'; Ketlen 57'

Estádio Ilha do Retiro, Recife
Referee: Cláudio Francisco Lima e Silva (Sergipe) SE

December 17, 2008
19:00

Santos (São Paulo (state))	3 – 0	Sport (Pernambuco)
Pikena 15'; Fran 32'; Ketlen 89'	(Report)

Estádio Ulrico Mursa, Santos
Referee: Janaína Geralda Costa (Minas Gerais) MF

Copa do Brasil de Futebol Feminino 2008

SANTOS
Champion
First title
