= 2012 Copa do Brasil de Futebol Feminino =

Tournament details
- Country: Brazil
- Teams: 32

Final positions
- Champions: (São Paulo (state)) São José
- Runners-up: (São Paulo (state)) Centro Olímpico

Tournament statistics
- Matches played: 42
- Goals scored: 165 (3.93 per match)

The 2012 Copa do Brasil de Futebol Feminino was the sixth staging of the competition. The competition started on March 10, 2012, and concluded on June 10, 2012. 32 clubs of all regions of Brazil participated of the cup, which is organized by the Brazilian Football Confederation (CBF).

== Competition format ==
The competition is contested by 32 clubs in a knock-out format where all rounds were played over two legs and the away goals rule was used, but in the first three rounds, if the away team won the first leg with an advantage of at least three goals, the second leg would not be played and the club automatically qualified to the next round.

== Table ==
First round
Baré	1 4
Oratório	1 2
Amazônia	2 0
Iranduba	2 5
CESMAC	1
São Francisco	9
Flamengo	1 1
Caucaia	2 4
Intercap	1 0
Viana	2 3
Santos	0 0
Pinheirense	1 4
Boca Júnior	0
Vitória	9
Botafogo	0 0
América	1 3
Clube Jaó	0
Atlético Mineiro	4
Duque de Caxias	0
Centro Olímpico	4
ASCOOP	0
Vasco da Gama	6
Serra	6 4
Iguaçu	0 0
Comercial	0
São José	4
Kindermann	6 4
Atlântico	0 0
Flores da Cunha	0
Francana	3
Campo Grande	1
Foz Cataratas	13

Round of 16
Baré	2 0
Iranduba	1 1
São Francisco	2 1
Caucaia	2 0
Viana	0 1
Pinheirense	1 2
Vitória	15
América	0
Atlético Mineiro	1 0
Centro Olímpico	0 5
Vasco da Gama	4
Serra	1
São José	1 1
Kindermann	1 0
Francana	0 0
Foz Cataratas	2 1

Quarterfinals
Iranduba	0 1
São Francisco	1 4
Pinheirense	0 0
Vitória	2 1
Centro Olímpico	0 3
Vasco da Gama	0 1
São José	0 2
Foz Cataratas	1 0

Semifinals
Centro Olímpico	1 1
Vitória	0 1
São Francisco	1 2
São José	4 3

Final
Centro Olímpico	0 2
São José	1 4

=== Semifinals ===
May 19
14:00 (UTC−03:00)

Centro Olímpico	1–0	Vitória

Estádio do Pacaembu, São Paulo

May 26
20:30 (UTC−03:00)

Vitória	1–1	Centro Olímpico

Estádio do Carneirão, Vitória de Santo Antão

May 19
17:00 (UTC−03:00)

São José	4–1	São Francisco

Estádio Martins Pereira, São José dos Campos

May 26
15:30 (UTC−03:00)

São Francisco	2–3	São José

Estádio Junqueira Ayres, São Francisco do Conde

=== Final ===
June 3
11:00 (UTC−03:00)

São José	1–0	Centro Olímpico
Karen 37'

Estádio Martins Pereira, São José dos Campos
Attendance: 1,019
Referee: Regildênia de Holanda Moura (São Paulo)

June 10
11:00 (UTC−03:00)

Centro Olímpico	2–4	São José
Maurine 4'; Chú 87'		Giovania 7'; Francielle 24'; Michele Carioca 30', 65'

Estádio do Pacaembu, São Paulo
Attendance: 2,744
Referee: Katiuscia da Mota Lima (São Paulo)

2012 Copa do Brasil de Futebol Feminino

São José
Champion
First title
