= 2014 International Women's Club Championship =

2014 Nestlé Cup
Tournament details
- Host country: Japan
- Dates: 30 November–6 December
- Teams: 6 (from 3 confederations)
- Venues: 2 (in 2 host cities)

Final positions
- Champions: (Brazil) São José (1st title)
- Runners-up: (England) Arsenal
- Third place: (Japan) Urawa Red Diamonds
- Fourth place: (Japan) Okayama Yunogo Belle

Tournament statistics
- Matches played: 6
- Goals scored: 20 (3.33 per match)
- Attendance: 7,872 (1,312 per match)

The 2014 International Women's Club Championship, known for sponsorship reasons as the Nestlé Cup, was the third worldwide international women's football club tournament, held in Japan from 30 November to 6 December 2014.

São José won the final 2–0 against Arsenal.

== Participating teams ==
Jiangsu Huatai from China won the last open spot by winning a qualifying tournament, called the Asian Women's Club Championship by some sources. As with the previous edition the UEFA Champions League winners Wolfsburg didn't participate.

Team	Tournament won	Confederation or FA	Reference
(England) Arsenal	2013–14 FA Women's Cup	UEFA	
(Australia) Melbourne Victory	2013–14 W-League	Football Federation Australia	
(Brazil) São José	2013 Copa Libertadores Femenina	CONMEBOL	
(China) Jiangsu Huatai	IWCC Qualifying tournament winner	AFC	
(Japan) Okayama Yunogo Belle	2014 Nadeshiko League Regular Series	Japan Football Association	
(Japan) Urawa Red Diamonds	2014 Nadeshiko League Exciting Series	Japan Football Association	

== Results ==
Playoffs
(Japan) Urawa Red Diamonds	5
(China) Jiangsu Huatai	1
(Japan) Okayama Yunogo Belle	5
(Australia) Melbourne Victory	0

Semifinals
(Japan) Urawa Red Diamonds	0
(Brazil) São José	1
(England) Arsenal	2
(Japan) Okayama Yunogo Belle	0

Final
(Brazil) São José	2
(England) Arsenal	0
Third place
(Japan) Urawa Red Diamonds	4
(Japan) Okayama Yunogo Belle	0

All times are local (UTC+9)

=== First round ===
30 November 2014
11:05

Urawa Red Diamonds (Japan)	5–1	(China) Jiangsu Huatai
Katō 11'; Kira 27', 58'; 76' (o.g.); Kishikawa 86'		Wang L. 41'

Mimasaka Rugby Football Field, Mimasaka
Attendance: 1,295

30 November 2014
14:10

Okayama Yunogo Belle (Japan)	5–0	(Australia) Melbourne Victory
Nakano 1', 82'; Arimachi 6', 37'; Miyama 75'	Report

Mimasaka Rugby Football Field, Mimasaka
Attendance: 1,863

=== Semifinals ===
3 December 2014
16:05

Urawa Red Diamonds (Japan)	0–1	(Brazil) São José
		Debinha 59'

Ajinomoto Field Nishigaoka, Tokyo
Attendance: 965

3 December 2014
19:05

Arsenal (England)	2–0	(Japan) Okayama Yunogo Belle
Ohno 16', 58'

Ajinomoto Field Nishigaoka, Tokyo
Attendance: 1,339

=== Third place play-off ===
6 December 2014
11:35

Urawa Red Diamonds (Japan)	4–0	(Japan) Okayama Yunogo Belle
Gotō 13'; Shibata 59'; Otaki 77'; Usui 90'

Ajinomoto Field Nishigaoka, Tokyo
Attendance: 1,041

=== Final ===
6 December 2014
15:10

São José (Brazil)	2–0	(England) Arsenal
Rosana 4'; Giovania 71' (pen.)

Ajinomoto Field Nishigaoka, Tokyo
Attendance: 1,365

== Prize-pool ==
The total prize-pool was 10 million yen (about $85,000) for all teams combined.
