= CEPE-Caxias =

- Full name: Clube dos Empregados da Petrobrás - Duque de Caxias
- Founded: March 29, 1999
- Ground: Marrentão, Duque de Caxias, Rio de Janeiro state
- Capacity: 10,000
Home colors	Away colors

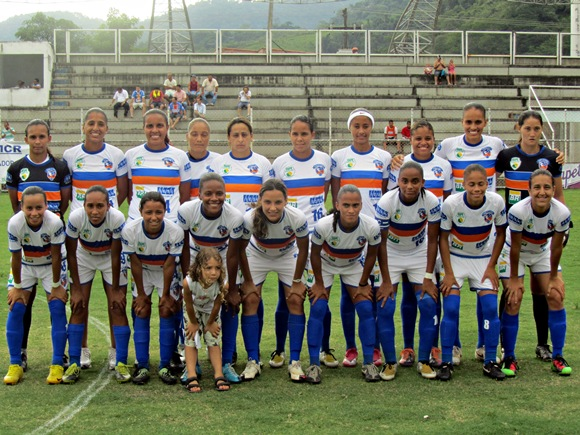
Team photo from the 2010 season

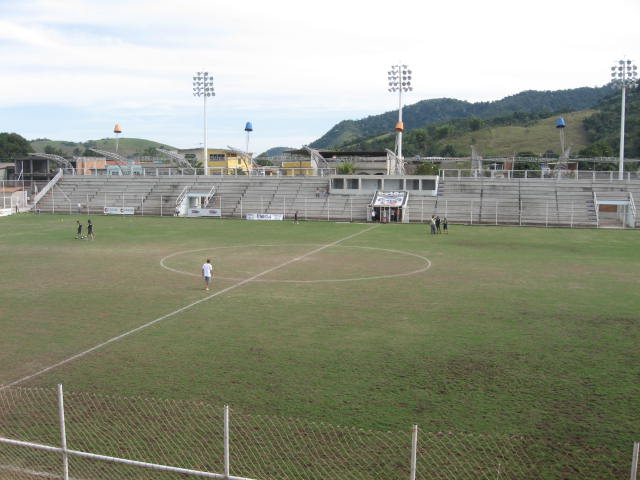
Estádio Romário de Souza Faria

Clube dos Empregados da Petrobrás - Duque de Caxias, usually known as CEPE-Caxias, is a Brazilian women's football team, from Duque de Caxias, Rio de Janeiro state.

== History ==
CEPE-Caxias was founded on March 29, 1999.

In 2006, and in 2007, the club won the Carioca Women's Football Championship.

In 2006, CEPE-Caxias also finished as Brazil Trophy's runner-up, after being defeated in the final by Botucatu.

The club, in a partnership with Duque de Caxias, won the Copa do Brasil de Futebol Feminino in 2010. The title qualified them for the 2011 Copa Libertadores Femenina, where they finished its group stage third out of four.

They won the Campeonato Carioca again in 2011, after beating Vasco in the final.

== Honours ==
=== National ===
- Copa do Brasil
  - Winners (1): 2010

=== State ===
- Campeonato Carioca
  - Winners (4): 2005, 2006, 2007, 2011

=== Youth team ===
- Campeonato Carioca Sub-17
  - Winners (1): 2008

== Stadium ==
São José play their home games at Estádio Romário de Souza Faria, nicknamed Marrentão. The stadium has a maximum capacity of 10,000 people.

== Noted players ==
- Ester
