= Estádio Romário de Souza Faria =

Soccer stadium in Xerém, Duque de Caxias, Brazil

Coordinates: 22°35′07.81″S 43°18′18.39″W

- Marrentão
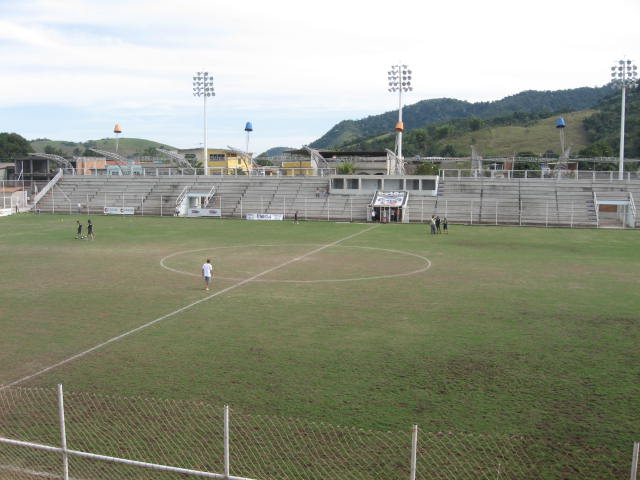
- Interactive map of Estádio Romário de Souza Faria
- Location: Duque de Caxias, Brazil
- Owner: Duque de Caxias Futebol Clube
- Capacity: 10,000
- Surface: Grass

Construction
- Opened: December 2007

Tenants
- Duque de Caxias Futebol Clube; CEPE-Caxias

Estádio Romário de Souza Faria, also known as Marrentão, is a football (soccer) stadium located in Xerém, a district of Duque de Caxias, Brazil. It is named after Brazilian footballer Romário de Souza Faria. The stadium is owned by Duque de Caxias. It replaced Estádio Mestre Telê Santana, nicknamed Maracanãzinho, as Duque de Caxias' home ground.

== History ==
The stadium was inaugurated in December 2007, when Duque de Caxias and Vasco da Gama drew 1–1. The first official game was played on January 30, 2008, when Cardoso Moreira beat Duque de Caxias 2–1.

On October 2, 2008, the Brazilian Fire Department approved the use of all 10,000 stadium seats. The stadium's capacity was previously limited to 4,000 people.
