= Copa do Brasil de Futebol Feminino =

- Founded: 2007
- Region: Brazil
- Teams: 64
- Current champions: Palmeiras (1st title)
- Most championships: Santos and São José (2 titles)
- Website: CBF
- 2026 Copa do Brasil de Futebol Feminino

The Copa do Brasil de Futebol Feminino (English: Brazilian Women's Football Cup) is a Brazilian Women's football competition organized by the Brazilian Football Confederation (CBF).

It was designed as an equivalent to the men's Copa do Brasil, with the first edition being played in 2007. Abolished in 2017, CBF announced the return of the competition on 17 January 2025, with 64 teams from the three national divisions.

== History ==
The competition was announced after FIFA president Sepp Blatter requested the creation of a professional women's football league in Brazil. Since Brazil had no national league until 2013, the winner of the 2008 to 2013 cups qualified for the Copa Libertadores Femenina.

CBF canceled the competition in 2017 to make the Campeonato Brasileiro de Futebol Feminino more balanced and attractive, but announced its return on 17 January 2025.

== Format ==
In 2007, the competition was contested by 32 teams, and was played from 30 October to 9 December of the same year. Copa do Brasil de Futebol Feminino's first stage was similar to the men's competition, thus being a knockout competition, played over two legs between clubs of the same region, and disputed in three rounds, but in the second stage the eight qualified clubs were divided in two groups of four teams each, playing against each other once, and held in a host city. The two best placed teams of each group qualified to the semifinals. The semifinal winners played the final while the losers played the third-place playoff. CBF determined that to be eligible to play in the competition it was necessary to be a minimum of 14 years old and a maximum of 34 years old, and half of the players of each club had to be aged between 14 and 18 years old.

In the past format, the competition was contested between the state champions, with states best-ranked in the CBF ranking receiving multiple entries, totalling 32 teams. For the 2025 edition, the competition will be contested by 64 teams: 16 from the Campeonato Brasileiro Série A1, 16 from the Campeonato Brasileiro Série A2, and 32 from the Campeonato Brasileiro Série A3.

== Referees ==
The Brazilian Football Confederation created a separated women's referee staff for the competition, not connected to the men's referee staff.

== List of champions ==
#	Finals decided on goal difference
‡	Finals decided away goals
*	Finals decided by a penalty shootout
**Bold**	Indicates the winner in two-legged finals
Year	Each link is the relevant Copa do Brasil de Futebol Feminino article for that year

Year	State	Winner	Score	Runner-up	State	Venue	Location	Refs
2007	(Mato Grosso do Sul) MS	**Mato Grosso do Sul/Saad**^{(1)}	1–1	Botucatu	(São Paulo (state)) SP	Estádio Mané Garrincha	Brasília, Distrito Federal	
Year	State	Home team	Score	Away team	State	Venue	Location	Refs
2008	(Pernambuco) PE	Sport	1–3	**Santos**	(São Paulo (state)) SP	Estádio Ilha do Retiro	Recife, Pernambuco	
2008	(São Paulo (state)) SP	**Santos**	3–0	Sport	(Pernambuco) PE	Estádio Ulrico Mursa	Santos, São Paulo	
2008	Santos won 6–1 on aggregate.							
Year	State	Winner	Score	Runner-up	State	Venue	Location	Refs
2009	(São Paulo (state)) SP	**Santos**	3–0	Botucatu	(São Paulo (state)) SP	Estádio do Pacaembu	São Paulo, São Paulo	
Year	State	Home team	Score	Away team	State	Venue	Location	Refs
2010	(Paraná (state)) PR	Foz do Iguaçu	2–1	**Duque de Caxias/CEPE**	(Rio de Janeiro (state)) RJ	Estádio do ABC	Foz do Iguaçu, Paraná	
2010	(Rio de Janeiro (state)) RJ	**Duque de Caxias/CEPE**	1–0	Foz do Iguaçu	(Paraná (state)) PR	Estádio Romário de Souza Faria	Duque de Caxias, Rio de Janeiro	
2010	Duque de Caxias/CEPE won 2–2 on away goals. ‡							
2011	(Pernambuco) PE	Vitória-PE	0–2	**Foz Cataratas**	(Paraná (state)) PR	Carneirão	Vitória de Santo Antão, Pernambuco	
2011	(Paraná (state)) PR	**Foz Cataratas**	3–0	Vitória-PE	(Pernambuco) PE	Estádio Pedro Basso	Foz do Iguaçu, Paraná	
2011	Foz Cataratas won 5–0 on aggregate.							
2012	(São Paulo (state)) SP	**São José**	1–0	Centro Olímpico	(São Paulo (state)) SP	Estádio Martins Pereira	São José dos Campos, São Paulo	
2012	(São Paulo (state)) SP	Centro Olímpico	2–4	**São José**	(São Paulo (state)) SP	Estádio do Pacaembu	São Paulo, São Paulo	
2012	São José won 5–2 on aggregate.							
2013	(Pernambuco) PE	Vitória-PE	1–1	**São José**	(São Paulo (state)) SP	Carneirão	Vitória de Santo Antão, PE	
2013	(São Paulo (state)) SP	**São José**	4–0	Vitória-PE	(Pernambuco) PE	Estádio Martins Pereira	São José dos Campos, SP	
2013	São José won 5–1 on aggregate.							
2014	(São Paulo (state)) SP	**Ferroviária**	1–0	São José	(São Paulo (state)) SP	Fonte Luminosa	Araraquara, SP	
2014	(São Paulo (state)) SP	São José	1–0 (4–5 pen)	**Ferroviária**	(São Paulo (state)) SP	Estádio Joe Sanchez	São José dos Campos, SP	
2014	Ferroviária won 5–4 on penalties.							
2015	(São Paulo (state)) SP	Ferroviária	3–3	**Kindermann**	(Santa Catarina (state)) SC	Fonte Luminosa	Araraquara, SP	
2015	(Santa Catarina (state)) SC	**Kindermann**	5–2	Ferroviária	(São Paulo (state)) SP	Estádio Carlos A.C. Neves	Caçador, SC	
2015	Kindermann won 8–5 on aggregate.							
2016	(São Paulo (state)) SP	São José	2–2	**Corinthians/Audax**	(São Paulo (state)) SP	Estádio Martins Pereira	São José dos Campos, SP	
2016	(São Paulo (state)) SP	**Corinthians/Audax**	3–1	São José	(São Paulo (state)) SP	Estádio José Liberatti,	Osasco, SP	
2016	Corinthians/Audax won 5–3 on aggregate.							
**2017-2024: Hiatus of the competition**
Year	State	Winner	Score	Runner-up	State	Venue	Location	Refs
2025	(São Paulo (state)) SP	Palmeiras	4–2	Ferroviária	(São Paulo (state)) SP	Fonte Luminosa	Araraquara, São Paulo	

^{(1)}The winner of 2007 was Mato Grosso do Sul from Campo Grande (MS), which consisted of a team supplied by Saad from São Paulo.

=== Performances ===
==== By club ====
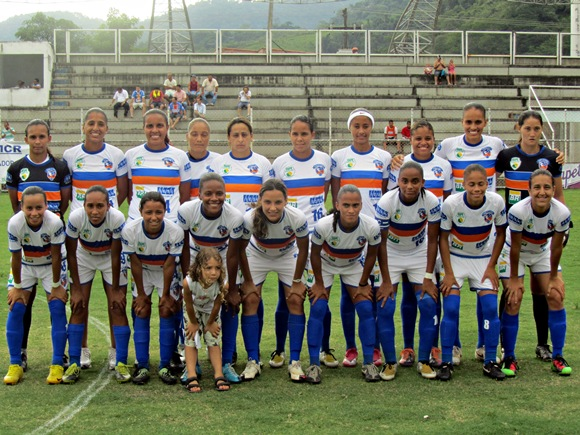
A lineup of Duque de Caxias/CEPE, winners in 2010

Team	Winners	Runners-up	Years won	Years runner-up
(São Paulo (state)) São José	2	2	2012, 2013	2014, 2016
(São Paulo (state)) Santos	2	0	2008, 2009	
(São Paulo (state)) Ferroviária	1	2	2014	2015, 2025
(São Paulo (state)) Palmeiras	1	0	2025	
(São Paulo (state)) Corinthians/Audax	1	0	2016	
(Rio de Janeiro (state)) Duque de Caxias/CEPE	1	0	2010	
(Paraná (state)) Foz Cataratas	1	0	2011	
(Santa Catarina (state)) Kindermann	1	0	2015	
Mato Grosso do Sul/Saad	1	0	2007	
(São Paulo (state)) Botucatu	0	3		2007, 2009, 2015
(Pernambuco) Vitória-PE	0	2		2011, 2013
(São Paulo (state)) Centro Olímpico	0	1		2012
(Paraná (state)) Foz do Iguaçu	0	1		2010
(Pernambuco) Sport	0	1		2008

==== By state ====
State	Winners	Runners-up	Winning clubs	Runners-up
São Paulo	7	6	Santos (2), São José (2), Corinthians/Audax, Ferroviária, Palmeiras (1)	Botucatu, São José (2), Centro Olímpico, Ferroviária (1)
Paraná	1	1	Foz Cataratas (1)	Foz do Iguaçu (1)
Rio de Janeiro	1	0	Duque de Caxias/CEPE (1)	
Santa Catarina	1	0	Kindermann (1)	
Pernambuco	0	3		Sport (1), Vitória-PE (2)

== See also ==
- Copa do Brasil, the men's version of Copa do Brasil de Futebol Feminino.
