= Sociedade Esportiva Tiradentes =

Brazilian football team

Tiradentes
- Full name: Sociedade Esportiva Tiradentes
- Nickname(s): Tigre; Amarelão da PM
- Founded: June 30, 1959
- Ground: Lindolfinho
- Capacity: 8,000
Home colours	Away colours

Sociedade Esportiva Tiradentes, commonly known as Tiradentes, are a Brazilian football team from Teresina. They won the Campeonato Piauiense five times and competed in the Série A five times. The women's team competed twice in the Copa do Brasil de Futebol Feminino.

== History ==
=== Men's team ===
They were founded on June 30, 1959. Tiradentes won the Campeonato Piauiense for the first time in 1972. They competed in the Série A in 1973, 1974, 1975, 1979 and in 1983. The club suffered Série A's largest goal margin in 1983, when Corinthians beat them 10–1.

=== Women's team ===
The club reached the second stage of the Copa do Brasil de Futebol Feminino in 2007, when they finished in Group 2's third place. Tiradentes reached the second stage in 2008, when they were eliminated by Sport.

== Stadium ==
They play their home games at the Lindolfinho stadium. The stadium has a maximum capacity of 8,000 people.

== Honours ==
=== State ===
- Campeonato Piauiense
  - Winners (5): 1972, 1974, 1975^{(1)}, 1982, 1990
  - Runners-up (4): 1973, 1980, 1983, 1984

^{(1)} The 1975 title was shared with River Atlético Clube.

- Torneio Início do Piauí
  - Winners (1): 1981

=== Women's Football ===
- Campeonato Piauiense de Futebol Feminino
  - Winners (10): 2008, 2009, 2010, 2012, 2015, 2017, 2018, 2019, 2022, 2023
