= São José Esporte Clube (women) =

Time de futebol brasileiro

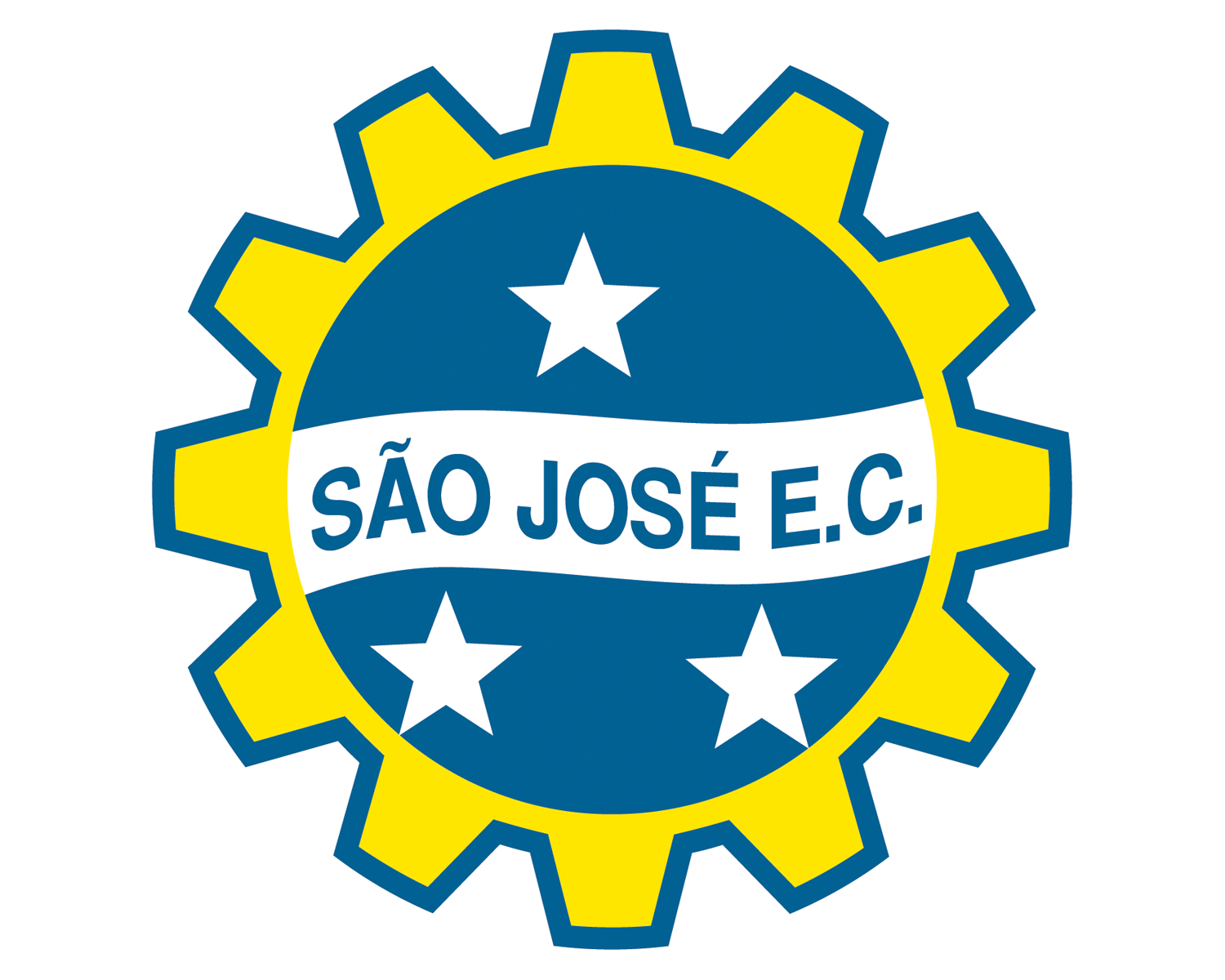
- Nicknames: Meninas da Águia, Maior do Brasil
- Founded: 2001
- Ground: Martins Pereira, São José dos Campos, São Paulo
- Capacity: 15,317
- League: Campeonato Brasileiro de Futebol #2
- 2019: 8th
| Home colors | Away colors | Third colors |

São José Esporte Clube, commonly known as just São José, is a Brazilian women's football club, based in the city of São José dos Campos, São Paulo state, Brazil. They won the Copa Libertadores Femenina three times and the Copa do Brasil twice.

== History ==
The club is a part of São José Esporte Clube, and its first participation in a professional competition was in the 2010 Campeonato Paulista, when they finished in the second position, after being defeated by Santos in the final. São José competed in the Copa do Brasil in 2011, reaching the Quarterfinals of the competition, when they were eliminated by Rio Preto. In the same year, on November 27, they won the 2011 Copa Libertadores, after beating Chilean club Colo-Colo 1-0 at Estádio Martins Pereira, São José dos Campos. The winning goal was scored by Poliana. The club won the Copa do Brasil in 2012, after beating fellow São Paulo state club Centro Olímpico 1-0 and 4-2 in the final. São José won the Campeonato Paulista for the first time in 2012, after beating Centro Olímpico in the final. They won the Copa do Brasil and the Copa Libertadores again in 2013.

== Stadium ==
São José play their home games at Estádio Martins Pereira. The stadium has a maximum capacity of 15,317 people.

== Current squad ==
As of 15 October 2022.

Note: Flags indicate national team as defined under FIFA eligibility rules; some limited exceptions apply. Players may hold more than one non-FIFA nationality.

| No. | Pos. | Nation | Player |
|---|---|---|---|
| — | GK | BRA | Rosany |
| — | MF | BRA | Thaynara |
| — | DF | BRA | Raquel |
| — | MF | BRA | Faby |
| — | MF | BRA | Rivena |
| — | DF | BRA | Mariana |
| — | MF | BRA | Rayane |
| — | FW | BRA | Jucelia |
| — | MF | BRA | Rafaela Soares |
| — | FW | BRA | Mylena Gomes |

| No. | Pos. | Nation | Player |
|---|---|---|---|
| — | MF | BRA | Maria Eduarda |
| — | MF | BRA | Joelma |
| — | MF | BRA | Geisiane |
| — | FW | BRA | Ariel |
| — | MF | BRA | Mylena |
| — | FW | BRA | Tipa |
| — | MF | BRA | Jhorrayna |
| — | FW | BRA | Rafaela |
| — | GK | BRA | Jessica |
| — | MF | BRA | Sirlayne |

== Honours ==
=== Official tournaments ===
International
| Competitions | Titles | Seasons |
|---|---|---|
| International Women's Club Championship | 1^{s} | 2014 |
Continental
| Competitions | Titles | Seasons |
| Copa Libertadores Femenina | 3 | 2011, 2013, 2014 |
National
| Competitions | Titles | Seasons |
| Copa do Brasil | 2^{s} | 2012, 2013 |
State
| Competitions | Titles | Seasons |
| Campeonato Paulista | 3 | 2012, 2014, 2015 |

- record
- ^{s} shared record

== See also ==
- São José Esporte Clube
- São José Basketball
