= Botucatu Futebol Clube =

Botucatu
- Full name: Botucatu Futebol Clube
- Founded: 1996
- Dissolved: 2010
- Ground: Estádio Acrísio Cruz
- Capacity: 5.500
Home colours	Away colours

Botucatu Futebol Clube, usually known simply as Botucatu, was a Brazilian women's football team, from Botucatu, São Paulo state.

== History ==
On February 16, 1996, Botucatu Futebol Clube was founded by Edson Castro after an invitation of the Federação Paulista de Futebol Feminino (São Paulo State's Women's Football Federation), which was the organizer of the Campeonato Paulista Feminino do Interior (Countryside Paulista State Championship).

In 2006, the club won the Brazil Trophy beating CEPE-Caxias in the final. The competition's top goalscorer was Grazielle, of Botucatu, who scored 11 goals. In the same year, the club also won the Paulista Women's Football Championship, beating Saad in the final. In 2008, Botucatu won the state championship for the second time, after beating again Saad in the final.

== Honours ==
=== Official tournaments ===
National
Competitions	Titles	Seasons
Taça Brasil	1^{s}	2006
State
Competitions	Titles	Seasons
Campeonato Paulista	3	2006, 2008, 2009

- record
- ^{s} shared record

== Current squad (some players) ==
According to the CBF official website. Note: Flags indicate national team as defined under FIFA eligibility rules; some limited exceptions apply. Players may hold more than one non-FIFA nationality.

No.	Pos.	Nation	Player
—	DF	BRA	Aleci (contract)
—	DF	BRA	Carol (contract)
—	MF	BRA	Anne (contract)
—			

=== Former players ===
For details of all current and former players with a Wikipedia article, see Category:Botucatu Futebol Clube players.

== Other sports ==
Besides football, the club also has a women's futsal section.
