= Associação Acadêmica e Desportiva Vitória das Tabocas =

Desportive brazilian club of Pernambuco

Vitória das Tabocas
- Full name: Associação Acadêmica e Desportiva Vitória das Tabocas
- Nicknames: Tricolor das Tabocas; Tricolor da Zona da Mata; Tricolor
- Founded: 3 August 1990; 35 years ago (as AD Vitória); 6 May 2008; 17 years ago (as AAD Vitória das Tabocas)
- Ground: Carneirão, Vitória de Santo Antão, Pernambuco state, Brazil
- Capacity: 8,000
- League: Campeonato Pernambucano
- 2025: Pernambucano Série A2, 1st of 10 (champions)
Home colours	Away colours	colours

Associação Acadêmica e Desportiva Vitória das Tabocas, commonly known as Vitória das Tabocas, or as Acadêmica Vitória, is a Brazilian men's and women's football club based in Vitória de Santo Antão, Pernambuco state. The women's team competed once in the Copa do Brasil de Futebol Feminino.

== History ==
The Associação Desportiva Vitória was founded on August 3, 1990. It competed in the Série C in 1992, when it was eliminated in the first stage of the competition, in 1993, in 1994, when it was eliminated in the third stage of the competition, in 1995, when it was eliminated in the second stage of the competition, and in 2005, when it was eliminated in the first stage of the competition. Vitória won the Copa Pernambuco in 1995 and in 2004.

In 2007, the club went through what would be the worst moment in its history: in the Pernambuco second division championship, it did not appear in the game against Íbis on August 11, a game valid for the penultimate round of the 1st phase and due to the absence of concern. of non-appearance in the game, the Pernambuco Football Federation (FPF) decided to punish the club with disaffiliation and banning it from playing in official competitions. The club resurfaced the following year, reformulated and with the help of Dr. Paulo Roberto at the general meeting. On their return, now called AAD Vitória das Tabocas, they won the Série A2 title in 2008, returning again to the elite of Pernambuco football.

The Associação Acadêmica e Desportiva Vitória das Tabocas was founded on May 6, 2008.

=== Women's team ===
It also finished fourth in the continental competition, the 2012 Copa Libertadores Femenina and participated in the 2014 edition.

They finished runners-up in the 2013 Copa do Brasil de Futebol Feminino.

== Stadium ==
Associação Acadêmica e Desportiva Vitória das Tabocas play their home games at Estádio Municipal Severino Cândido Carneiro, nicknamed Carneirão. The stadium has a maximum capacity of 8,000 people.

== Honours ==
=== State ===
- Copa Pernambuco
  - Winners (2): 1995, 2004 (as AD Vitória)
- Campeonato Pernambucano Série A2
  - Winners (3): 2008, 2013, 2025

=== Women's Football ===
- Campeonato Pernambucano de Futebol Feminino
  - Winners (8): 2010, 2011, 2012, 2013, 2014, 2015, 2016, 2019
