= 2013 Campeonato Paulista de Futebol Feminino =

Campeonato Paulista de Futebol Feminino
- Season: 2013
- Dates: 27 April – 6 October 2013
- Champions: Ferroviária
- Matches played: 112
- Goals scored: 408 (3.64 per match)
- Top goalscorer: (Brazil) Raquel Fernandes (22 goals)

The Paulista Football Championship of 2013 was the 15th edition of this championship women's football organized by the Paulista Football Federation (FPF). Played between April and October, the competition had fifteen participants. Initially, the competition would have sixteen participants, but América–SP gave up before the start.

== Format ==
The 2013 Campeonato Paulista de Futebol Feminino was held in four stages:

In the first, the fifteen were divided into two groups, one of eight teams and another of seven, facing each other home and away, with the four best in each group qualifying to the quarterfinals. The quarterfinals, semifinals and the final were played in home and away eliminatory games.

== Teams ==
Team	City	2012 result
ABD Botucatu	Botucatu	Second stage
América São Manuel	São Manuel	First stage
Botafogo–SP	Ribeirão Preto	–
Centro Olímpico	São Paulo	2nd
Cotia	Cotia	First stage
Ferroviaria	Araraquara	First stage
Francana	Franca	Second stage
Paulista	Jundiaí	First stage
Portuguesa	São Paulo	Semifinal
Rio Preto	São José do Rio Preto	Second stage
São Bernardo	São Bernardo do Campo	First stage
São Caetano	São Caetano do Sul	Second stage
São José	São José dos Campos	1st
Taubaté	Taubaté	First stage
XV de Piracicaba	Piracicaba	Semifinal

Source: "Regulamento específico do campeonato paulista de futebol feminino primeira divisão - 2013" (PDF). futebolpaulista.com.br. Federação Paulista de Futebol. 25 March 2013.

== First stage ==
=== Group 1 ===
Pos	Team	Pld	W	D	L	GF	GA	GD	Pts	Qualification
1	Ferroviaria	12	10	2	0	65	5	+60	32	Advanced to Second stage
2	Rio Preto	12	8	3	1	41	11	+30	27	Advanced to Second stage
3	Francana	12	6	3	3	18	11	+7	21	Advanced to Second stage
4	XV de Piracicaba	12	6	2	4	32	15	+17	20	Advanced to Second stage
5	América São Manuel	12	4	1	7	17	33	−16	13	
6	ABD Botucatu	12	1	1	10	7	54	−47	4	
7	Botafogo–SP	12	1	0	11	7	58	−51	3	

Updated to match(es) played on 7 October 2013. Source: FPF
Rules for classification: 1) points; 2) wins; 3) goal difference; 4) goals scored; 5) head-to-head results (only between 2 teams); 6) fewest red cards; 7) fewest yellow cards; 8) draw.

=== Group 2 ===
Pos	Team	Pld	W	D	L	GF	GA	GD	Pts	Qualification
1	São José	14	10	2	2	33	9	+24	32	Advanced to Second stage
2	Centro Olímpico	14	9	4	1	41	16	+25	31	Advanced to Second stage
3	Portuguesa	14	6	6	2	24	14	+10	24	Advanced to Second stage
4	São Caetano	14	7	2	5	34	18	+16	23	Advanced to Second stage
5	Cotia	14	6	2	6	23	28	−5	20	
6	São Bernardo	14	3	2	9	15	28	−13	11	
7	Paulista	14	2	2	10	8	46	−38	8	
8	Taubaté	14	2	2	10	9	28	−19	8	

Updated to match(es) played on 7 October 2013. Source: FPF
Rules for classification: 1) points; 2) wins; 3) goal difference; 4) goals scored; 5) head-to-head results (only between 2 teams); 6) fewest red cards; 7) fewest yellow cards; 8) draw.

== Bracket ==
Quarterfinals
Ferroviária	1	2	3
São Caetano	1	2	3
Centro Olímpico	1	1	2
Francana	0	3	3
São José	3	0	3
XV de Piracicaba	0	0	0
Rio Preto	1	2	3
Portuguesa	1	0	1

Semi-finals
Ferroviária	2	3	5
Francana	1	1	2
São José	0	3	3
Rio Preto	0	3	3

Finals
Ferroviária	1	1	2
São José	1	1	2

== Quarterfinals ==
Team 1	Agg.	Team 2	1st leg	2nd leg
Ferroviária	3 – 3	São Caetano	1–1	2–2
Centro Olímpico	2 – 3	Francana	0–1	1–3
São José	3 – 0	XV de Piracicaba	0–3	0–0
Rio Preto	3 – 1	Portuguesa	1–1	2–0

31 August 2013
10:00

São Caetano	1–1	Ferroviária
Glaucia 7'	Report	11' Adriane

Águias de Nova Gerty, São Caetano do Sul
Referee: Junior Cesar da Silva
8 September 2013
10:00

Ferroviária	2–2	São Caetano
Andressa Alves 66'; Raquel Fernandes 70'	Report	22' Glaucia; 51' Cacau

Fonte Luminosa, Araraquara
Referee: Katiuscia da Mota Lima

Ferroviária advanced to the semifinal due to better campaign.

1 September 2013
10:00

Francana	0–1	Centro Olímpico
	Report	54' Gabi Zanotti

Lancha Filho, Franca
Referee: Lucas Martins Mola e Dias
8 September 2013
10:00

Centro Olímpico	1–3	Francana
Luize Nery 33'	Report	31', 57' Grace; 54' Iara

Distrital da Vila Guarani, São Paulo
Referee: Givaldo Alves dos Santos

Francana won 3–2 on aggregate and advanced to the semifinal.

1 September 2013
10:00

XV de Piracicaba	0–3	São José
	Report	65' Renata Diniz; 80' Francielle; 89' Bruna Benites

Barão da Serra Negra, Piracicaba
Referee: Rafael de Araújo Pereira
8 September 2013
10:00

São José	0–0	XV de Piracicaba
	Report

João do Pulo, São José dos Campos
Referee: Fernando dos Santos Ignacio de Souza

São José won 3–0 on aggregate and advanced to the semifinal.

31 August 2013
15:00

Portuguesa	1–1	Rio Preto
Grazielle 30'	Report	16' Pikena

CT da Portuguesa, São Paulo
Referee: Jefferson Dutra Giroto
7 September 2013
10:00

Rio Preto	2–0	Portuguesa
Jéssica Lima 21'; Pikena 86'	Report

Anísio Haddad, São José do Rio Preto
Referee: Adeli Mara Monteiro

Rio Preto won 3–1 on aggregate and advanced to the semifinal.

== Semi-finals ==
Team 1	Agg.	Team 2	1st leg	2nd leg
Ferroviária	5 – 2	Francana	1–2	3–1
São José	3 – 3	Rio Preto	0–0	3–3

14 September 2013
15:00

Francana	1–2	Ferroviária
Iara 51'	Report	27' Andressa Alves; 75' Neném

Lancha Filho, Franca
Referee: Cristiano de Lazzari
29 September 2013
10:00

Ferroviária	3–1	Francana
Raquel Fernandes 14', 78'; Ludmila 60'	Report	80' Raquel Maisa

Fonte Luminosa, Araraquara
Referee: Fernanda dos Santos Ignacio de Souza

Ferroviária won 5–2 on aggregate and advanced to the semifinal.

15 September 2013
10:00

Rio Preto	0–0	São José
	Report

Anísio Haddad, São José do Rio Preto
Referee: Rafael Emilio Acerra
29 September 2013
10:00

São José	3–3	Rio Preto
Gislaine 39'; Fabi Simões 71'; Giovânia 90+2'	Report	40' (pen.), 80' Barrinha; 70' Darlene Reguera

João do Pulo, São José dos Campos
Referee: Adeli Mara Monteiro

São José advanced to the semifinal due to better campaign.

== Final ==
Team 1	Agg.	Team 2	1st leg	2nd leg
Ferroviaria	2 – 2	São José	1-1	1–1

3 October 2013
15:00

São José	1–1	Ferroviária
Kaká Sant'anna 90+3'	Report	31' Ludmila

João do Pulo, São José dos Campos
Referee: Regildenia de Holanda Moura
6 October 2013
10:00

Ferroviária	1–1	São José
Marina Aggio 7'	Report	47' Formiga

Fonte Luminosa, Araraquara
Referee: Adeli Mara Monteiro

Ferroviária was champion due to better campaign.

== Top goalscorers ==
As of 7 October 2013

Rank	Player	Club	Goals
1	(Brazil) Raquel Fernandes	Ferroviária	22
2	(Brazil) Barrinha	Rio Preto	12
3	(Brazil) Susana	Cotia	10
3	(Brazil) Cacau	São Caetano	10
5	(Brazil) Andressa Alves	Ferroviária	9
5	(Brazil) Grazielle	Portuguesa	9
5	(Brazil) Suzana	Rio Preto	9

Source: Federação Paulista de Futebol
