= 2015 Campeonato Paulista de Futebol Feminino =

Campeonato Paulista de Futebol Feminino
- Season: 2015
- Dates: 18 April – 6 September 2015
- Champions: São José
- Matches played: 98
- Goals scored: 372 (3.8 per match)
- Top goalscorer: (Brazil) Gabi Nunes (Brazil) Juliete (12 goals)

The Paulista Football Championship of 2015 was the 17th edition of this championship women's football organized by the Paulista Football Federation (FPF). Played between April and September, the competition had fourteen participants.

== Format ==
The 2015 Campeonato Paulista de Futebol Feminino was held in four stages:

In the first, the fourteen were divided into 2 groups of 7 teams, facing each other home and away, with the four best in each group qualifying to the quarterfinals. The quarterfinals, semifinals and the final were played in home and away eliminatory games.

== Teams ==
| Team | City | 2014 result |
|---|---|---|
| América São Manuel | São Manuel | Second stage |
| Audax | Osasco | – |
| Centro Olímpico | São Paulo | Second stage |
| Ferroviaria | Araraquara | 2nd |
| Francana | Franca | First stage |
| Guarani | Campinas | – |
| Rio Preto | São José do Rio Preto | Semifinal |
| Portuguesa | São Paulo | Second stage |
| Santos | Santos | – |
| São Bernardo | São Bernardo do Campo | First stage |
| São José | São José dos Campos | 1st |
| São Paulo | São Paulo | – |
| Taubaté | Taubaté | Second stage |
| XV de Piracicaba | Piracicaba | Semifinal |

Source: "Regulamento específico do campeonato paulista de futebol feminino primeira divisão - 2015" (PDF). futebolpaulista.com.br. Federação Paulista de Futebol. 1 June 2015.

== First stage ==
=== Group 1 ===
| Pos | Team | Pld | W | D | L | GF | GA | GD | Pts | Qualification |
|---|---|---|---|---|---|---|---|---|---|---|
| 1 | Audax | 12 | 11 | 0 | 1 | 56 | 7 | +49 | 33 | Advanced to Second stage |
| 2 | Rio Preto | 12 | 8 | 1 | 3 | 46 | 9 | +37 | 25 | Advanced to Second stage |
| 3 | Ferroviaria | 12 | 7 | 2 | 3 | 37 | 9 | +28 | 23 | Advanced to Second stage |
| 4 | XV de Piracicaba | 12 | 7 | 2 | 3 | 32 | 6 | +26 | 21 | Advanced to Second stage |
| 5 | Francana | 12 | 4 | 1 | 7 | 22 | 36 | −14 | 13 | |
| 6 | Guarani | 12 | 2 | 0 | 10 | 13 | 72 | −59 | 2 | |
| 7 | América São Manuel | 12 | 0 | 0 | 12 | 0 | 67 | −67 | −1 | |

Updated to match(es) played on 5 July 2015. Source: FPF
Rules for classification: 1) points; 2) wins; 3) goal difference; 4) goals scored; 5) head-to-head results (only between 2 teams); 6) fewest red cards; 7) fewest yellow cards; 8) draw.

=== Group 2 ===
| Pos | Team | Pld | W | D | L | GF | GA | GD | Pts | Qualification |
|---|---|---|---|---|---|---|---|---|---|---|
| 1 | São Paulo | 12 | 9 | 3 | 0 | 30 | 3 | +27 | 30 | Advanced to Second stage |
| 2 | São José | 12 | 9 | 1 | 2 | 32 | 3 | +29 | 28 | Advanced to Second stage |
| 3 | Santos | 12 | 7 | 2 | 3 | 27 | 9 | +18 | 23 | Advanced to Second stage |
| 4 | Taubaté | 12 | 4 | 5 | 3 | 13 | 18 | −5 | 17 | Advanced to Second stage |
| 5 | São Bernardo | 12 | 1 | 3 | 8 | 7 | 32 | −25 | 6 | |
| 6 | Centro Olímpico | 12 | 1 | 3 | 8 | 4 | 29 | −25 | 6 | |
| 7 | Portuguesa | 12 | 2 | 1 | 9 | 8 | 27 | −19 | 3 | |

Updated to match(es) played on 5 July 2015. Source: FPF
Rules for classification: 1) points; 2) wins; 3) goal difference; 4) goals scored; 5) head-to-head results (only between 2 teams); 6) fewest red cards; 7) fewest yellow cards; 8) draw.

== Bracket ==
Quarterfinals
Audax | 2 | 2 | 4
Taubaté | 0 | 0 | 0
São José | 1 | 4 | 5
Ferroviaria | 0 | 4 | 4
São Paulo | 1 | 4 | 5
XV de Piracicaba | 2 | 0 | 2
Rio Preto | 0 | 2 | 2
Santos | 2 | 2 | 4

Semi-finals
Audax | 0 | 0 | 0
São José | 1 | 1 | 2
São Paulo | 2 | 2 | 4
Santos | 2 | 2 | 4

Finals
São José | 1 | 6 | 7
São Paulo | 1 | 1 | 2

== Quarterfinals ==
| Team 1 | Agg. | Team 2 | 1st leg | 2nd leg |
|---|---|---|---|---|
| Audax | 4 - 0 | Taubaté | 0-2 | 2-0 |
| São José | 5 - 4 | Ferroviaria | 0-1 | 4-4 |
| São Paulo | 5 - 2 | XV de Piracicaba | 2-1 | 4-0 |
| Rio Preto | 2 - 4 | Santos | 2-0 | 2-2 |

2 August 2015
10:00

| Taubaté | 0-2 | Audax |
|---|---|---|
| | Report | 36' Gabi Nunes; 75' Grazielle |

Joaquinzão, Taubaté
Referee: Édilar Ferreira
8 August 2015
18:00

| Audax | 2-0 | Taubaté |
|---|---|---|
| Juliana Oliveira 38'; Marjorie Boilesen 64' | Report |

José Liberatti, Osasco
Referee: Allan da Silva Bonardi

Audaz won 4-0 on aggregate and advanced to the semifinal.

1 August 2015
15:00

| Ferroviária | 0-1 | São José |
|---|---|---|
| | Report | 7' Yasmim |

Fonte Luminosa, Araraquara
Referee: Katiucia da Mota Lima
8 August 2015
10:00

| São José | 4-4 | Ferroviária |
|---|---|---|
| Chú Santos 27'; Alanna 31'; Gislaine 65'; Karina 85' | Report | 15', 56' Daiane Rodrigues; 16' Adriane; 49' Rafa Mineira |

Martins Pereira, São José dos Campos
Referee: Adeli Mara Monteiro

São José won 5-4 on aggregate and advanced to the semifinal.

2 August 2015
10:00

| XV de Piracicaba | 2-1 | São Paulo |
|---|---|---|
| Moara 40', 47' | Report | 20' Sole Jaimes |

Barão da Serra Negra, Piracicaba
Referee: Rafael de Araujo Pereira
9 August 2015
15:00

| São Paulo | 4-0 | XV de Piracicaba |
|---|---|---|
| Carla Nunes 8', 29'; Mylla 71'; Cris 87' | Report |

Arena Barueri, Barueri
Referee: Davi Alexander Fernandes Costa

São Paulo won 5-2 on aggregate and advanced to the semifinal.

2 August 2015
10:00

| Santos | 2-0 | Rio Preto |
|---|---|---|
| Luize Nery 44'; Karen Peliçari 75' | Report |

CT Rei Pelé, Santos
Referee: Alex Lopes Loula
8 August 2015
15:00

| Rio Preto | 2-2 | Santos |
|---|---|---|
| Kamilla Sotero 30'; Siméia 80' (pen.) | Report | 42' Alline Calandrini; 55' Luize Nery |

Anísio Haddad, São José do Rio Preto
Referee: Cleber Luis Paulino

Santos won 4-2 on aggregate and advanced to the semifinal.

== Semi-finals ==
| Team 1 | Agg. | Team 2 | 1st leg | 2nd leg |
|---|---|---|---|---|
| Audax | 0 - 2 | São José | 1-0 | 0-1 |
| São Paulo | 4 - 4 | Santos | 2-2 | 2-2 |

15 August 2015
10:00

| São José | 1-0 | Audax |
|---|---|---|
| Chú Santos 44' | Report |

Martins Pereira, São José dos Campos
Referee: Eleandro Pedro da Silva
23 August 2015
16:00

| Audax | 0-1 | São José |
|---|---|---|
| | Report | 39' Gabi Portilho |

José Liberatti, Osasco
Referee: Saulo Samuel Muniz Felix

São José won 2-0 on aggregate and advanced to the final.

16 August 2015
10:00

| Santos | 2-2 | São Paulo |
|---|---|---|
| Luize Nery 10'; Maglia 70' | Report | 75' Tiga; 79' (pen.) Carla Nunes |

CT Rei Pelé, Santos
Referee: Carlos Roberto dos Santos Junior
23 August 2015
18:00

| São Paulo | 2-2 | Santos |
|---|---|---|
| Carla Nunes 19', 34' | Report | 54' Alline Calandrini; 61' Cida |

Campo do Complexo Social do Morumbi, São Paulo
Referee: Giuliano Dutra Pellegrini

São Paulo advanced to the final due to better campaign.

== Final ==
| Team 1 | Agg. | Team 2 | 1st leg | 2nd leg |
|---|---|---|---|---|
| São José | 7 – 2 | São Paulo | 1–1 | 6-1 |

30 August 2015
15:00

| São Paulo | 1-1 | São José |
|---|---|---|
| Beatriz 90+3' | Report | 45+1' (pen.) Gislaine |

Nicolau Alayon, São Paulo
Referee: Katiucia da Mota Lima
6 September 2015
11:00

| São José | 6-1 | São Paulo |
|---|---|---|
| Gislaine 13', 19'; Chú Santos 34', 71'; Carlinha 74', 82' | Report | 36' Nágela |

Martins Pereira, São José dos Campos
Referee: Marcelo Rogério

== Top goalscorers ==
As of 6 September 2015

| Rank | Player | Club | Goals |
|---|---|---|---|
| 1 | (Brazil) Gabi Nunes | Audax | 12 |
| 1 | (Brazil) Juliete | Audax | 12 |
| 3 | (Brazil) Grazielle | Audax | 11 |
| 3 | (Brazil) Luize Nery | Santos | 11 |
| 5 | (Brazil) Kamilla Sotero | Rio Preto | 10 |
| 5 | (Brazil) Chú Santos | São José | 10 |

Source: Federação Paulista de Futebol
