= 2014 Campeonato Paulista de Futebol Feminino =

Campeonato Paulista de Futebol Feminino
- Season: 2014
- Dates: 19 April – 6 September 2014
- Champions: São José
- Matches played: 74
- Goals scored: 279 (3.77 per match)
- Top goalscorer: (Brazil) Grazielle (9 goals)

The Paulista Football Championship of 2014 was the 16th edition of this championship women's football organized by the Paulista Football Federation (FPF). Played between April and September, the competition had twelve participants.

== Format ==
The 2014 Campeonato Paulista de Futebol Feminino was held in four stages:

In the first, the twelve were divided into 2 groups of 6 teams, facing each other home and away, with the four best in each group qualifying to the quarterfinals. The quarterfinals, semifinals and the final were played in home and away eliminatory games.

== Teams ==
Team	City	2013 result
ABD Botucatu	Botucatu	First stage
América São Manuel	São Manuel	First stage
Centro Olímpico	São Paulo	Second stage
Ferroviaria	Araraquara	1st
Francana	Franca	Semifinal
Paulista	Jundiaí	First stage
Portuguesa	São Paulo	Second stage
Rio Preto	São José do Rio Preto	Semifinal
São Bernardo	São Bernardo do Campo	First stage
São José	São José dos Campos	2nd
Taubaté	Taubaté	First stage
XV de Piracicaba	Piracicaba	Second stage

Source: "Regulamento específico do campeonato paulista de futebol feminino primeira divisão - 2014" (PDF). futebolpaulista.com.br. Federação Paulista de Futebol. 31 March 2014.

== First stage ==
=== Group 1 ===
Pos	Team	Pld	W	D	L	GF	GA	GD	Pts	Qualification
1	Ferroviaria	10	6	3	1	32	6	+26	21	Advanced to Second stage
2	XV de Piracicaba	10	6	2	2	12	9	+3	20	Advanced to Second stage
3	Rio Preto	10	5	3	2	25	8	+17	18	Advanced to Second stage
4	América São Manuel	10	4	2	4	13	18	−5	14	Advanced to Second stage
5	Francana	10	3	1	6	8	18	−10	10	
6	ABD Botucatu	10	0	1	9	6	37	−31	1	

Updated to match(es) played on 8 September 2014. Source: FPF
Rules for classification: 1) points; 2) wins; 3) goal difference; 4) goals scored; 5) head-to-head results (only between 2 teams); 6) fewest red cards; 7) fewest yellow cards; 8) draw.

=== Group 2 ===
Pos	Team	Pld	W	D	L	GF	GA	GD	Pts	Qualification
1	São José	10	10	0	0	46	3	+43	30	Advanced to Second stage
2	Centro Olímpico	10	7	1	2	43	5	+38	22	Advanced to Second stage
3	Portuguesa	10	6	0	4	24	22	+2	18	Advanced to Second stage
4	Taubaté	10	3	1	6	13	24	−11	10	Advanced to Second stage
5	São Bernardo	10	2	2	6	16	23	−7	8	
6	Paulista	10	0	0	10	3	68	−65	0	

Updated to match(es) played on 8 September 2014. Source: FPF
Rules for classification: 1) points; 2) wins; 3) goal difference; 4) goals scored; 5) head-to-head results (only between 2 teams); 6) fewest red cards; 7) fewest yellow cards; 8) draw.

== Bracket ==
Quarterfinals
São José	6	2	8
América São Manuel	0	1	1
XV de Piracicaba	2	0	2
Portuguesa	0	2	2
Ferroviaria	2	1	3
Taubaté	1	0	1
Centro Olímpico	0	1	1
Rio Preto	2	2	4

Semi-finals
São José	4	1	5
XV de Piracicaba	2	0	2
Ferroviaria	2	3	5
Rio Preto	1	0	1

Finals
São José	0	2	2
Ferroviaria	2	0	2

== Quarterfinals ==
Team 1	Agg.	Team 2	1st leg	2nd leg
São José	8 - 1	América São Manuel	0-6	2-1
XV de Piracicaba	2 - 2	Portuguesa	0-2	0-2
Ferroviaria	3 - 1	Taubaté	1-2	1-0
Centro Olímpico	1 - 4	Rio Preto	2-0	1-2

3 August 2014
10:00

América São Manuel	0-6	São José
	Report	36' Mariana Pires; 42' Poliana; 56' Bruna Benites; 71' Michele Carioca; 74' Rita Bove; 89' (pen.) Giovânia

Adhemar de Barros, São Manuel
Referee: Cesar Luiz de Oliveira
9 August 2014
15:00

São José	2-1	América São Manuel
Priscila 19'; Renata Diniz 81'	Report	50' Patrícia Vendrami

ADC Parahyba, São José dos Campos
Referee: Marcio André Moreira

São José won 8-1 on aggregate and advanced to the semifinal.

3 August 2014
10:00

Portuguesa	0-2	XV de Piracicaba
	Report	23' (pen.) Karen Peliçari; 75' Iara

CT da Portuguesa, São Paulo
Referee: Alex Leite Palmira
10 August 2014
10:00

XV de Piracicaba	0-2	Portuguesa
	Report	28', 65' Grazielle

Barão da Serra Negra, Piracicaba
Referee: Cristiano de Lazzari

XV de Piracicaba advanced to the semifinal due to better campaign.

3 August 2014
10:00

Taubaté	1-2	Ferroviaria
Aline Rosa 54'	Report	76' Marina Aggio; 81' Tábatha

Joaquinzão, Taubaté
Referee: Marcelo Fabiano Mingoranci
10 August 2014
10:00

Ferroviaria	1-0	Taubaté
Mônica 65'	Report

Fonte Luminosa, Araraquara
Referee: Paulo Alessandro Gonçalves Teodoro

Ferroviária won 3-1 on aggregate and advanced to the semifinal.

2 August 2014
15:00

Rio Preto	2-0	Centro Olímpico
Darlene 58', 87'	Report

Anísio Haddad, São José do Rio Preto
Referee: Clayton de Oliveira Dutra
10 August 2014
10:00

Centro Olímpico	1-2	Rio Preto
Tamires 87'	Report	11' Jéssica Lima; 49' Pikena

Distrital da Vila Guarani, São Paulo
Referee: Édilar Ferreira

Rio Preto won 4-1 on aggregate and advanced to the semifinal.

== Semi-finals ==
Team 1	Agg.	Team 2	1st leg	2nd leg
São José	5 - 2	XV de Piracicaba	2-4	1-0
Ferroviaria	5 - 1	Rio Preto	1-2	3-0

15 August 2014
15:00

XV de Piracicaba	2-4	São José
Giovanna Crivelari 35'; Jujuba Cardozo 56'	Report	7' Bruna Benites; 27' Mariana Pires; 51' Poliana; 67' Francielle

Barão da Serra Negra, Piracicaba
Referee: Lucenilton Souza Ferreira
23 August 2014
15:00

São José	1-0	XV de Piracicaba
Andressa Alves 31'	Report

ADC Parahyba, São José dos Campos
Referee: Fernanda dos Santos Ignacio de Souza

São José won 5-2 on aggregate and advanced to the semifinal.

15 August 2014
15:00

Rio Preto	1-2	Ferroviaria
Dih 81'	Report	15' Rafa Travalão; 85' Paula Vicenzo

Anísio Haddad, São José do Rio Preto
Referee: Wanecley Lopes da Silva
24 August 2014
10:00

Ferroviaria	3-0	Rio Preto
Rafa Travalão 55', 62'; Adriane 74'	Report

Fonte Luminosa, Araraquara
Referee: Rodrigo Gomes Paes Domingues

Ferroviária won 5-1 on aggregate and advanced to the semifinal.

== Final ==
Team 1	Agg.	Team 2	1st leg	2nd leg
São José	2 – 2	Ferroviaria	2–0	2-0

31 August 2014
10:00

Ferroviaria	2-0	São José
Adriane 41', 45' (pen.)	Report

Fonte Luminosa, Araraquara
Referee: Roberto Pinelli
6 September 2014
19:00

São José	2-0	Ferroviaria
Francielle 69'; Renata Diniz 76'	Report

Martins Pereira, São José dos Campos
Referee: Adeli Mara Monteiro

São José was champion due to better campaign.

== Top goalscorers ==
As of 9 September 2014

Rank	Player	Club	Goals
1	(Brazil) Grazielle	Portuguesa	9
2	(Brazil) Cristiane	Centro Olímpico	7
2	(Brazil) Tamires	Centro Olímpico	7
2	(Brazil) Tcheury Goya	São Bernardo	7
2	(Brazil) Giovânia	São José	7

Source: Federação Paulista de Futebol
