= 2018 Campeonato Paulista de Futebol Feminino =

Women's football competition in Brazil

Campeonato Paulista de Futebol Feminino
- Season: 2018
- Dates: 24 March – 6 October 2018
- Champions: Santos
- Matches: 102
- Goals: 372 (3.65 per match)
- Top goalscorer: (Brazil) Lelê (18 goals)

The Paulista Football Championship of 2018 was the 26th edition of this championship women's football organized by the Paulista Football Federation (FPF). Played between March and October, the competition had thirteen participants.

== Format ==
The 2018 Campeonato Paulista de Futebol Feminino was held in four stages:

In the first, the thirteen were divided into 2 groups, one of 6 and other of 7 teams, facing each other home and away, with the four best in each group qualifying to the next round. In the second, the eight teams were divided into 2 groups of 4 teams, facing each other home and away, with the two best in each group qualifying to the semifinals. The semifinals and the final were played in home and away eliminatory games.

== Teams ==
Team	City	2017 result
Audax	Osasco	Second stage
Centro Olímpico	São Paulo	First stage
Corinthians	São Paulo	Semifinal
Embu das Artes	Embu das Artes	First stage
Ferroviaria	Araraquara	Second stage
Francana	Franca	First stage
Juventus	São Paulo	First stage
Ponte Preta	Campinas	Semifinal
Rio Preto	São José do Rio Preto	1st
Portuguesa	São Paulo	Second stage
Santos	Santos	2nd
São José	São José dos Campos	Second stage
Taubaté	Taubaté	First stage

Source: "Regulamento específico do campeonato paulista de futebol feminino primeira divisão - 2018" (PDF). futebolpaulista.com.br. Federação Paulista de Futebol. 6 March 2018.

== First stage ==
=== Group 1 ===
Pos	Team	Pld	W	D	L	GF	GA	GD	Pts	Qualification
1	Rio Preto	10	6	3	1	23	11	+12	21	Advanced to Second stage
2	Ferroviaria	10	5	3	2	27	15	+12	18	Advanced to Second stage
3	Ponte Preta	10	5	1	4	20	14	+6	16	Advanced to Second stage
4	Audax	10	4	3	3	14	12	+2	15	Advanced to Second stage
5	Francana	10	2	1	7	10	22	−12	7	
6	Embu das Artes	10	2	1	7	11	31	−20	7	

Updated to match(es) played on 23 June 2018. Source: FPF
Rules for classification: 1) points; 2) wins; 3) goal difference; 4) goals scored; 5) head-to-head results (only between 2 teams); 6) fewest red cards; 7) fewest yellow cards; 8) draw.

=== Group 2 ===
Pos	Team	Pld	W	D	L	GF	GA	GD	Pts	Qualification
1	Corinthians	12	11	1	0	46	10	+36	34	Advanced to Second stage
2	Santos	12	8	2	2	48	11	+37	26	Advanced to Second stage
3	São José	12	6	4	2	24	15	+9	22	Advanced to Second stage
4	Taubaté	12	5	2	5	20	17	+3	17	Advanced to Second stage
5	Juventus	12	3	3	6	11	30	−19	12	
6	Portuguesa	12	2	1	9	15	44	−29	7	
7	Centro Olímpico	12	0	1	11	7	44	−37	1	

Updated to match(es) played on 23 June 2018. Source: FPF
Rules for classification: 1) points; 2) wins; 3) goal difference; 4) goals scored; 5) head-to-head results (only between 2 teams); 6) fewest red cards; 7) fewest yellow cards; 8) draw.

== Second stage ==
=== Group 3 ===
Pos	Team	Pld	W	D	L	GF	GA	GD	Pts	Qualification
1	Santos	6	4	2	0	19	5	+14	14	Advanced to Semifinals
2	Rio Preto	6	2	3	1	11	11	0	9	Advanced to Semifinals
3	São José	6	1	3	2	8	9	−1	6	
4	Audax	6	1	0	5	9	22	−13	3	

Updated to match(es) played on 8 September 2018. Source: FPF
Rules for classification: 1) points; 2) wins; 3) goal difference; 4) goals scored; 5) head-to-head results (only between 2 teams); 6) fewest red cards; 7) fewest yellow cards; 8) draw.

=== Group 4 ===
Pos	Team	Pld	W	D	L	GF	GA	GD	Pts	Qualification
1	Corinthians	6	6	0	0	16	3	+13	18	Advanced to Semifinals
2	Taubaté	6	3	0	3	10	12	−2	9	Advanced to Semifinals
3	Ferroviaria	6	1	1	4	6	11	−5	4	
4	Ponte Preta	6	1	1	4	6	12	−6	4	

Updated to match(es) played on 9 September 2018. Source: FPF
Rules for classification: 1) points; 2) wins; 3) goal difference; 4) goals scored; 5) head-to-head results (only between 2 teams); 6) fewest red cards; 7) fewest yellow cards; 8) draw.

== Bracket ==
Semi-finals
Corinthians	3	0	3
Taubaté	0	0	0
Santos	1	2	3
Rio Preto	0	0	0

Finals
Corinthians	0	2	2
Santos	1	2	3

== Semifinals ==
=== Semi-finals ===
Team 1	Agg.	Team 2	1st leg	2nd leg
Corinthians	3 - 0	Taubaté	0-3	0-0
Santos	3 - 0	Rio Preto	0-1	2-0

16 September 2018
10:00

Taubaté	0-3	Corinthians
	Report	18' Érika; 60', 62' Adriana

Joaquinzão, Taubaté
Referee: Rodrigo Santos
22 September 2018
15:00

Corinthians	0-0	Taubaté
	Report

Parque São Jorge, São Paulo
Referee: Paulo Santiago de Medeiros

Corinthians won 3-0 on aggregate and advanced to the final.

15 September 2018
15:00

Rio Preto	0-1	Santos
	Report	34' (pen.) Maurine

Anísio Haddad, São José do Rio Preto
Referee: Daniel Carlos Luciano Fernandes
23 September 2018
19:00

Santos	2-0	Rio Preto
Rosana 32'; Mari Machado 66' (o.g.)	Report

Vila Belmiro, Santos
Referee: Jefferson Dutra Giroto

Santos won 3-0 on aggregate and advanced to the final.

== Final ==
Team 1	Agg.	Team 2	1st leg	2nd leg
Corinthians	2 – 3	Santos	0-1	2–2

2 October 2018
20:30

Santos	1-0	Corinthians
Chú Santos 46'	Report

Vila Belmiro, Santos
Referee: Thiago Luis Scarascati
6 October 2018
11:00

Corinthians	2-2	Santos
Marcela 1'; Érika 51'	Report	17' Brena; 84' Ketlen

Parque São Jorge, São Paulo
Referee: Vinicius Furlan

== Top goalscorers ==
As of 6 October 2018

Rank	Player	Club	Goals
1	(Brazil) Lelê	Rio Preto	18
2	(Brazil) Adriana	Corinthians	12
2	(Brazil) Chú Santos	Santos	12
4	(Brazil) Ketlen	Santos	11
5	(Brazil) Tipa	São José	10

Source: Federação Paulista de Futebol
