= Thaís Picarte =

Brazilian footballer

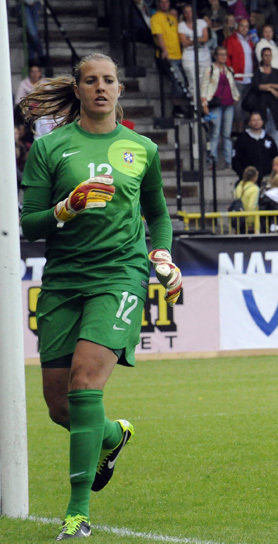

Personal information
- Full name: Thaís Ribeiro Picarte
- Date of birth: 22 July 1982 (age 44)
- Place of birth: Santo André, Brazil
- Height: 1.81 m (5 ft 11 in)
- Position: Goalkeeper

Team information
- Current team: Santos (football coordinator)

Youth career
- 1997–1998: São Paulo

Senior career*
| Years | Team | Apps | (Gls) |
| 1999 | São Paulo | | |
| 2000 | Palestra | | |
| 2001 | Juventus-SP | | |
| 2002 | Lazio | | |
| 2003 | São Bernardo | | |
| 2005 | São Paulo | | |
| 2006 | Palmeiras/São Bernardo | | |
| 2006–2008 | Sporting Huelva | 28 | (0) |
| 2008 | Corinthians | | |
| 2008–2009 | Sporting Huelva | 30 | (0) |
| 2009 | São Bernardo | | |
| 2009–2010 | Levante | 22 | (0) |
| 2011 | Bangu | | |
| 2011–2012 | Vitória das Tabocas | | |
| 2012–2014 | Centro Olímpico | | |
| 2015–2016 | São José | | |
| 2016–2017 | Sporting Huelva | 20 | (0) |
| 2017–2018 | Santos | | |

International career
| 2006–2014 | Brazil | | |
- * Club domestic league appearances and goals

Thaís Ribeiro Picarte (born 22 July 1982) is a Brazilian retired footballer who played as a goalkeeper. She is the current football coordinator of Santos' women's team.

During her career, Thaís has played in the Brazilian, Spanish and Italian leagues. She took part in the 2011 World Cup as a reserve, and was Brazil's first choice goalkeeper during 2007 World Cup qualification.

== Playing career ==
Thais and her sisters used to play in amateur fields in the ABC Paulista, where they were known as "The Feared Picartes". At the age of 14, in March 1997, she was discovered by a scout and invited for a trial with the reserve team of São Paulo. Two years later, she was promoted to the first team and won her first title the following season.

After São Paulo, she played for Juventus-SP, São Bernardo, and then decided to leave Brazil. She moved to Italy, where she received an invitation to trials and played for the Roman club Lazio.

She returned to Brazil in 2003, playing for São Bernardo. In 2005, she was transferred to São Paulo, where she was called up to the Brazilian University National Team.

In 2006, while playing for Palmeiras/São Bernardo, she received her first call-up to the Brazil women's national football team. She had a brief spell at Corinthians in 2008, before moving to Sporting Club de Huelva in Spain, where she played exclusively for the women’s team from 2006 to 2009.

After her standout performances at the Andalusian club, she was signed by Levante, a club with a strong history in the Spanish league, where she played during the 2009–10 season. That same year, she won the South American Championship with the Brazil national team.

In the following year, she helped Brazil finish as runners-up at the 2011 Pan American Games in Guadalajara. In the same year, she also played at the 2011 FIFA Women's World Cup in Germany for Brazil.

Coming from Bangu, in August 2011, she signed with Vitória das Tabocas. In 2012, she played in the Campeonato Paulista for Centro Olímpico.

In 2015, she joined São José. She spent one and a half years at the club, winning the Campeonato Paulista, the Jogos Abertos do Interior and the Jogos Regionais. After the elimination in the 2016 Paulista Championship, she returned to Huelva, Spain.

In May 2017, she joined Santos, where she played until 2018.

== Post-playing career ==
In 2019, she became the coordinator of the youth categories of Santos women's football. In this role, she won the under-17 Campeonato Paulista.

In January 2020, she worked as a commentator for the Copa São Paulo de Futebol Júnior on TV Cultura. Between August and September of the same year, she also commented on the International Tournament of Women's National Teams on the same network.

In February 2022, she took over as coordinator of the Women's Football Department at the Federação Paulista de Futebol (FPF).

In January 2024, she became Coordinator of Women's Football at Santos FC.

== Honours ==
São Paulo

- Campeonato Paulista: 1999

São José

- Campeonato Paulista: 2015

Santos

- Campeonato Paulista: 2018

Brazil

- South American Women's Championship: 2010
- Torneio Internacional Cidade de São Paulo: Runner-up (2010)
