= 2017 Campeonato Paulista de Futebol Feminino =

Campeonato Paulista de Futebol Feminino
- Season: 2017
- Dates: 8 April – 7 October 2017
- Champions: Rio Preto
- Matches: 142
- Goals: 496 (3.49 per match)
- Top goalscorer: (Brazil) Tábatha (17 goals)

The Paulista Football Championship of 2017 was the 19th edition of this championship women's football organized by the Paulista Football Federation (FPF). Played between April and October, the competition had sixteen participants.

== Format ==
The 2017 Campeonato Paulista de Futebol Feminino was held in four stages:

In the first, the sixteen were divided into 2 groups of 8 teams, facing each other home and away, with the four best in each group qualifying to the next round. In the second, the eight teams were divided into 2 groups of 4 teams, facing each other home and away, with the two best in each group qualifying to the semifinals. The semifinals and the final were played in home and away eliminatory games.

== Teams ==
Team	City	2016 result
Audax	Osasco	–
Botafogo–SP	Ribeirão Preto	–
Centro Olímpico	São Paulo	Semifinal
Corinthians	São Paulo	Semifinal
Embu das Artes	Embu das Artes	–
Ferroviaria	Araraquara	Second stage
Francana	Franca	First stage
Juventus	São Paulo	First stage
Ponte Preta	Campinas	–
Rio Branco	Americana	–
Rio Preto	São José do Rio Preto	1st
Portuguesa	São Paulo	Second stage
Santos	Santos	2nd
São José	São José dos Campos	Second stage
Taubaté	Taubaté	First stage
XV de Piracicaba	Piracicaba	Second stage

Source: "Regulamento específico do campeonato paulista de futebol feminino primeira divisão - 2017" (PDF). futebolpaulista.com.br. Federação Paulista de Futebol. 28 March 2017.

== First stage ==
=== Group 1 ===
Pos	Team	Pld	W	D	L	GF	GA	GD	Pts	Qualification
1	Rio Preto	14	13	0	1	55	10	+45	39	Advanced to Second stage
2	Ponte Preta	14	9	2	3	32	18	+14	29	Advanced to Second stage
3	Ferroviaria	14	8	4	2	42	13	+29	28	Advanced to Second stage
4	Audax	14	6	5	3	26	21	+5	23	Advanced to Second stage
5	XV de Piracicaba	14	5	4	5	33	19	+14	19	
6	Francana	14	3	2	9	10	49	−39	11	
7	Botafogo–SP	14	3	0	11	8	29	−21	9	
8	Rio Preto	14	0	1	13	10	57	−47	1	

Updated to match(es) played on 2 July 2017. Source: FPF
Rules for classification: 1) points; 2) wins; 3) goal difference; 4) goals scored; 5) head-to-head results (only between 2 teams); 6) fewest red cards; 7) fewest yellow cards; 8) draw.

=== Group 2 ===
Pos	Team	Pld	W	D	L	GF	GA	GD	Pts	Qualification
1	Corinthians	14	12	2	0	70	6	+64	38	Advanced to Second stage
2	Santos	14	12	2	0	41	6	+35	38	Advanced to Second stage
3	São José	14	8	2	4	21	10	+11	26	Advanced to Second stage
4	Portuguesa	14	6	3	5	24	19	+5	21	Advanced to Second stage
5	Embu das Artes	14	3	2	9	15	29	−14	11	
6	Taubaté	14	3	1	10	10	33	−23	10	
7	Juventus	14	2	3	9	8	32	−24	9	
8	Centro Olímpico	14	1	3	10	10	64	−54	6	

Updated to match(es) played on 2 July 2017. Source: FPF
Rules for classification: 1) points; 2) wins; 3) goal difference; 4) goals scored; 5) head-to-head results (only between 2 teams); 6) fewest red cards; 7) fewest yellow cards; 8) draw.

== Second stage ==
=== Group 3 ===
Pos	Team	Pld	W	D	L	GF	GA	GD	Pts	Qualification
1	Santos	6	5	0	1	14	3	+11	15	Advanced to Semifinals
2	Rio Preto	6	4	0	2	13	8	+5	12	Advanced to Semifinals
3	São José	6	3	0	3	5	8	−3	9	
4	Audax	6	0	0	6	4	17	−13	0	

Updated to match(es) played on 10 September 2017. Source: FPF
Rules for classification: 1) points; 2) wins; 3) goal difference; 4) goals scored; 5) head-to-head results (only between 2 teams); 6) fewest red cards; 7) fewest yellow cards; 8) draw.

=== Group 4 ===
Pos	Team	Pld	W	D	L	GF	GA	GD	Pts	Qualification
1	Corinthians	6	4	2	0	12	0	+12	14	Advanced to Semifinals
2	Ponte Preta	6	3	1	2	10	10	0	10	Advanced to Semifinals
3	Ferroviaria	6	1	4	1	7	5	+2	7	
4	Portuguesa	6	0	1	5	5	19	−14	1	

Updated to match(es) played on 10 September 2017. Source: FPF
Rules for classification: 1) points; 2) wins; 3) goal difference; 4) goals scored; 5) head-to-head results (only between 2 teams); 6) fewest red cards; 7) fewest yellow cards; 8) draw.

== Bracket ==
Semi-finals
Santos	1	2	3
Ponte Preta	0	0	0
Corinthians	0	0	0
Rio Preto	2	0	2

Finals
Santos	1	1	2
Rio Preto	1	3	4

== Semi-finals ==
Team 1	Agg.	Team 2	1st leg	2nd leg
Santos	3 - 0	Ponte Preta	0-1	2-0
Corinthians	0 - 2	Rio Preto	2-0	0-0

17 September 2017
15:00

Ponte Preta	0-1	Santos
	Report	66' Sole Jaimes

Moisés Lucarelli, Campinas
Referee: José Guilherme Almeida e Souza
24 September 2017
15:00

Santos	2-0	Ponte Preta
Brena 9'; Ketlen 68'	Report

Vila Belmiro, Santos
Referee: Willer Fulgêncio Santos

Santos won 3-0 on aggregate and advanced to the final.

16 September 2017
15:00

Rio Preto	2-0	Corinthians
Adriana Leal 55'; Mônica Bitencourt 90+2'	Report

José Maria de Campos Maia, Mirassol
Referee: Danilo da Silva
23 September 2017
18:00

Corinthians	0-0	Rio Preto
	Report

Arena Barueri, Barueri
Referee: Roberto Pinelli

Rio Preto won 2-0 on aggregate and advanced to the final.

== Final ==
Team 1	Agg.	Team 2	1st leg	2nd leg
Santos	2 – 4	Rio Preto	1-1	1–3

30 September 2017
15:00

Rio Preto	1-1	Santos
Millene 90+3' (pen.)	Report	15' Brena

José Maria de Campos Maia, Mirassol
Referee: Kleber Canto dos Santos
7 October 2017
16:00

Santos	1-3	Rio Preto
Brena 4'	Report	6' Jéssica Lima; 44' Lelê; 88' Millene

Vila Belmiro, Santos
Referee: Leandro Bizzio Marinho

== Top goalscorers ==
As of 7 October 2017

Rank	Player	Club	Goals
1	(Brazil) Tábatha	Ferroviária	17
2	(Brazil) Adriana	Rio Preto	13
3	(Brazil) Byanca Brasil	Corinthians	11
3	(Brazil) Lucélia	Portuguesa	11
3	(Brazil) Millene	Rio Preto	11
3	(Brazil) Karen	Santos	11

Source: Federação Paulista de Futebol
