= Paulistão F =

Women's football league in São Paulo, Brazil

- Organising body: Federação Paulista de Futebol
- Founded: 1987
- First season: Paulista 1987
- Country: Brazil
- Confederation: CBF; Federação Paulista de Futebol
- Number of clubs: 8
- Promotion to: Brasileiro Série A3
- Domestic cup: Copa Paulista de Futebol Feminino
- Current champions: Palmeiras (4th title) (2025)
- Most championships: Corinthians; Palmeiras; Santos (4 titles each)
- Broadcasters: Sportv; YouTube; CazéTV; HBO Max; Space; Record News; TV Globo
- Website: www.futebolpaulista.com.br
- Current: 2026 Paulistão F

The Paulistão F (formerly Campeonato Paulista de Futebol Feminino – Paulista Women's Football Championship, in English) is the women's football state championship of São Paulo State, and is contested since 1987.

== Format ==
There is no predetermined format for the competition, changing almost every year.

The 2001 edition became notorious as "one of the most discriminatory sports championships ever". Organisers controversially excluded all players with what was perceived as unattractive qualities such as being over 23 years old, having short hair or dark skin.

In 2004, the competition was contested by 32 teams, divided into eight groups of four teams each. The two best placed teams of each group qualified for the second round, contested by 16 teams divided into four groups composed of four teams each. Again, the two best placed teams qualified for the third round, contested between eight teams, divided into two groups of four teams each. The two best teams of each group qualified for the fourth round, which was composed of a single group of four teams. The first two teams of this group qualified for the final. The competition was contested in single leg matches.

In 2005, the competition was contested by 16 teams, divided into four groups of four teams each, playing against each other once. The two best teams of each group qualified for the next round. The teams eliminated in the first round played relegation playoffs, over two legs. The second round consisted of two groups of four teams each, playing in two leg matches. Each group's two best placed teams qualified for the third round, which was semifinal matches over two legs. The winners of these matches qualified for the final, which was played as a single match.

On 30 April 2026, the Campeonato Paulista de Futebol Feminino was named Paulistão F, in an attempt to dissociate the name of the competition from gender differentiations.

== List of champions ==
Following is the list with all recognized titles of Campeonato Paulista Feminino:

Season	Champions	Runners-up
1987	Juventus (1)	Ferroviária
1988–1996	Not held	
1997	São Paulo (1)	Santos
1998	Portuguesa (1)	Corinthians
1999	São Paulo (2)	Portuguesa
2000	Portuguesa (2)	Palmeiras
2001	Palmeiras (1)	Matonense
2002–2003	Not held	
2004	Ferroviária (1)	Alameda Glória
2005	Ferroviária (2)	Saad
2006	Botucatu (1)	Saad
2007	Santos (1)	AJA
2008	Botucatu (2)	Saad
2009	Botucatu (3)	Santos
2010	Santos (2)	São José
2011	Santos (3)	Centro Olímpico
2012	São José (1)	Centro Olímpico
2013	Ferroviária (3)	São José
2014	São José (2)	Ferroviária
2015	São José (3)	São Paulo
2016	Rio Preto (1)	Santos
2017	Rio Preto (2)	Santos
2018	Santos (4)	Corinthians
2019	Corinthians (1)	São Paulo
2020	Corinthians (2)	Ferroviária
2021	Corinthians (3)	São Paulo
2022	Palmeiras (2)	Santos
2023	Corinthians (4)	São Paulo
2024	Palmeiras (3)	Corinthians
2025	Palmeiras (4)	Corinthians

== Titles by team ==
Teams in bold stills active.

Rank	Club	Winners	Winning years
1	**Corinthians**	4	2019, 2020, 2021, 2023
1	**Palmeiras**	4	2001, 2022, 2024, 2025
1	**Santos**	4	2007, 2010, 2012, 2018
4	Botucatu	3	2006, 2008, 2009
4	**Ferroviária**	3	2004, 2005, 2013
4	**São José**	3	2012, 2014, 2015
7	**Portuguesa**	2	1998, 2000
7	**Rio Preto**	2	2016, 2017
7	**São Paulo**	2	1997, 1999
10	**Juventus**	1	1987

=== By city ===
City	Championships	Clubs
São Paulo	13	Corinthians (4), Palmeiras (4), Portuguesa (2), São Paulo (2), Juventus (1)
Santos	4	Santos (4)
Araraquara	3	Ferroviária (3)
Botucatu	3	Botucatu (3)
São José dos Campos	3	São José (3)
São José do Rio Preto	2	Rio Preto (2)

== Top Scorers ==
Year	Player (team)	Goals
1987	Unknown	
1997	Kátia Cilene (São Paulo)	35
1998	Kátia Cilene (São Paulo)	24
1999	Kátia Cilene (São Paulo)	48
2000	Grazielle (Portuguesa)	28
2001	Alessandra (Guarani); Tiganinha (Portuguesa)	10
2004	Dani Cadê (Santos)	20
2005	Unknown	
2006	Bárbara (Saad)	16
2007	Grazielle (Botucatu)	26
2008	Grazielle (Botucatu); Nilda (Corinthians)	26
2009	Nilda (Corinthians)	20
2010	Elaine Pernalonga (Rio Preto)	17
2011	Debinha (Centro Olímpico); Glaucia (Centro Olímpico)	24
2012	Tiganinha (Portuguesa)	11
2013	Raquel Fernandes (Ferroviária)	22
2014	Grazielle (Portuguesa)	9
2015	Gabi Nunes (Grêmio Audax); Juli (Grêmio Audax)	12
2016	(Argentina) Sole Jaimes (Santos)	16
2017	Tabatha (Ferroviária)	17
2018	Letícia (Rio Preto)	18
2019	Victória (Corinthians)	11
2020	Gabi Nunes (Corinthians)	11
2021	Adriana Leal (Corinthians); Miriã (Corinthians)	8
2022	Cristiane (Santos)	19
2023	Victória (Corinthians)	10
2024	Amanda Gutierres (Palmeiras)	8
2025	Amanda Gutierres (Palmeiras); Brena (Palmeiras); Natalia (Palmeiras)	6

=== All-time topscorers ===
Following is the list with the top 10 topscorers of all-time in the Campeonato Paulista Feminino:

#	Player	Goals
1	Grazielle	245
2	Nilda	135
3	Kátia Cilene	101
4	Suzana Agostini	92
5	Rafa Travalão	85
6	Almirene Pikena	83
7	Ketlen	80
7	Raquel Fernandes	80
9	Giovânia	78
9	Karen	78
