= Adriana (footballer, born 1996) =

Brazilian footballer (born 1996)

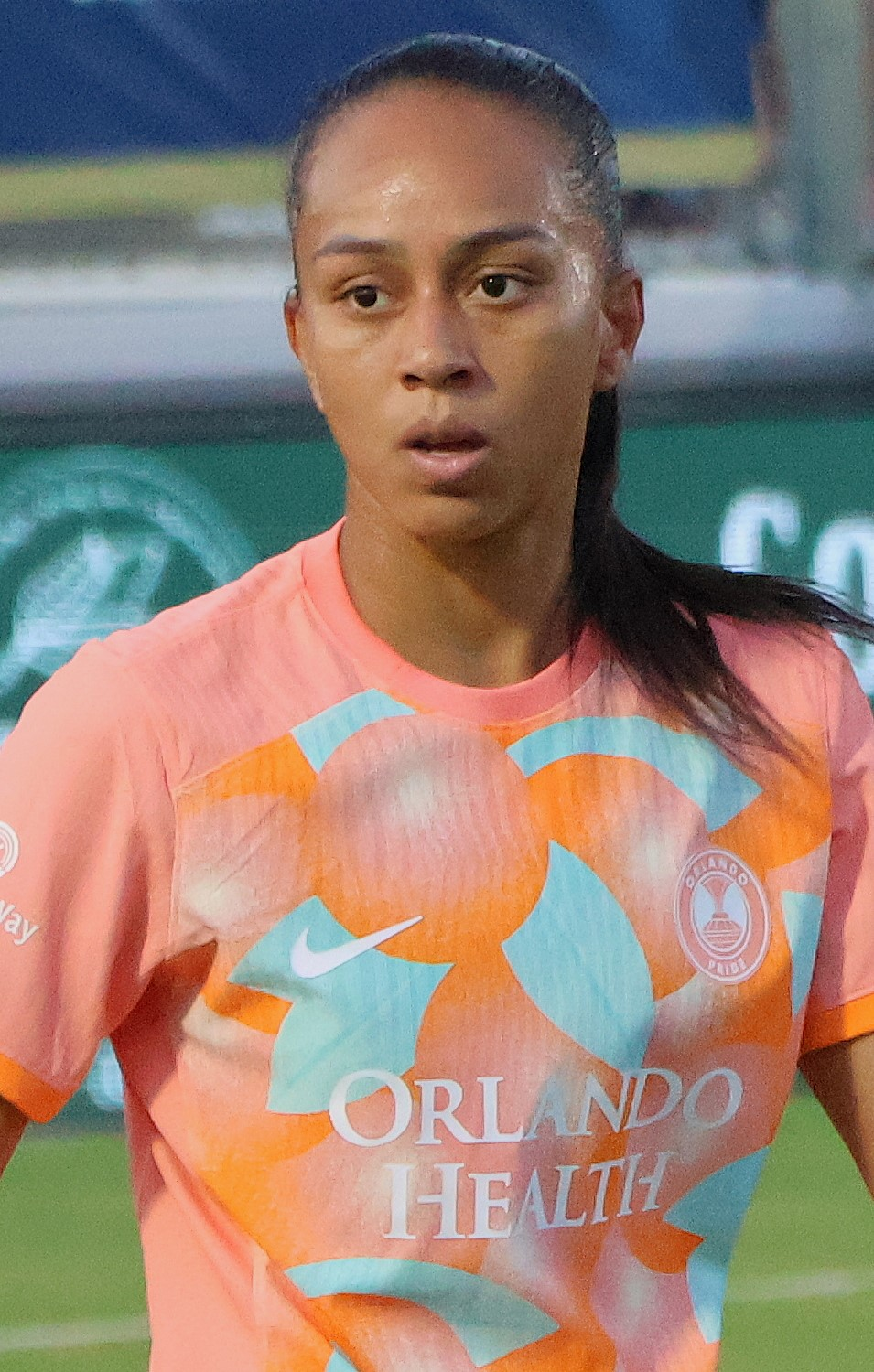
- Adriana with the Orlando Pride in 2024

Personal information
- Full name: Adriana Leal da Silva
- Date of birth: 17 November 1996 (age 29)
- Place of birth: União, Piauí, Brazil
- Height: 1.66 m (5 ft 5 in)
- Position: Forward

Team information
- Current team: Al Qadsiah
- Number: 16

Senior career*
Years	Team	Apps	(Gls)
2012	Flamengo (PI)		
2013–2015	Tiradentes	14	(4)
2016–2017	Rio Preto	19	(7)
2018–2022	Corinthians	79	(37)
2023–2024	Orlando Pride	42	(12)
2025–	Al Qadsiah	3	(1)

International career^{‡}
2017–	Brazil	71	(16)
Medal record
Women's football
Representing Brazil
Olympic Games
Silver medal – second place	2024 Paris
- * Club domestic league appearances and goals as of 10 March 2025 ‡ National team caps and goals as of 27 February 2026

Adriana Leal da Silva (born 17 November 1996), commonly known as Adriana or Maga, is a Brazilian professional footballer who plays as a forward for Al Qadsiah of the Saudi Women's Premier League and the Brazil women's national team.

== Club career ==
Adriana was born in União, Piauí and played for Tiradentes in the State and Brazilian championships. In 2016 she was hired by Rio Preto, as a replacement for Darlene de Souza.

Adriana scored as Corinthians won the 2018 Campeonato Brasileiro de Futebol Feminino, beating her former club Rio Preto 5–0 on aggregate in the final. Her 14 league goals made her the second highest goal scorer and she was named 2018 Prêmio Craque do Brasileirão.

On 19 January 2023, Adriana signed a three-year contract with Orlando Pride of the American National Women's Soccer League (NWSL). In January 2024, she acquired a US green card, meaning she would no longer occupy an international roster spot.

The Pride transferred Adriana to Saudi Women's Premier League club Al Qadsiah FC on 30 January 2025. The transfer fee that Orlando received was the highest in club history and one of the top three highest in NWSL history.

== International career ==
In October 2017, Adriana won her first cap for the senior Brazil women's national football team at the 2017 Yongchuan International Tournament, appearing as a substitute for Gabi Zanotti in a 3–0 win over Mexico. Five days later she scored her first national team goal in a 2–2 draw with hosts China.

Adriana featured at the 2018 Tournament of Nations, but had been left out of the final 22-player roster for the 2018 Copa América Femenina. She was called up again for two friendlies with Canada in September 2018.

Brazil's final 23-player squad for the 2019 FIFA Women's World Cup was announced on 16 May 2019. Adriana was included but she had to be replaced by Luana the following day, due to a knee ligament injury.

Adriana was called up to the Brazil squad for the 2022 Copa América Femenina, which Brazil finished as winners.

Adriana was called up to the Brazil squad for the 2023 FIFA Women's World Cup.

On 1 February 2024, Adriana was called up to the Brazil squad for the 2024 CONCACAF W Gold Cup.

On 2 July 2024, Adriana was called up to the Brazil squad for the 2024 Summer Olympics.

== Career statistics ==
=== Club ===
As of 10 March 2025

Appearances and goals by club, season and competition
Club	Season	League			Cup (Note: Campeonato Paulista, NWSL Challenge Cup, and Saudi Women's Cup)		Playoffs		Continental (Note: Copa Libertadores Femenina)		Other		Total	
Club	Season	Division	Apps	Goals	Apps	Goals	Apps	Goals	Apps	Goals	Apps	Goals	Apps	Goals
Tiradentes	2013	Campeonato Brasileiro	3	0			—		—		—		3	0
Tiradentes	2014	Campeonato Brasileiro	0	0			—		—		—		0	0
Tiradentes	2015	Campeonato Brasileiro	11	4			—		—		—		11	4
Tiradentes	Total		14	4	0	0	0	0	0	0	0	0	14	4
Rio Preto	2016	Campeonato Brasileiro	13	6			—		—		—		13	6
Rio Preto	2017	Campeonato Brasileiro	6	1			—		—		—		6	1
Rio Preto	Total		19	7	0	0	0	0	0	0	0	0	19	7
Corinthians	2018	Campeonato Brasileiro	19	14	18	12	—		—		—		37	26
Corinthians	2019	Campeonato Brasileiro	7	3	5	5	—		—		—		12	8
Corinthians	2020	Campeonato Brasileiro	19	6	6	1	—		6	4	—		25	7
Corinthians	2021	Campeonato Brasileiro	17	5	12	8	—		5	2	—		34	15
Corinthians	2022	Campeonato Brasileiro	17	9	5	1	—		4	2	3 (Note: 2022 Supercopa do Brasil de Futebol Feminino)	0	29	12
Corinthians	Total		79	37	46	27	0	0	15	8	3	0	137	68
Orlando Pride	2023	NWSL	19	6	1	0	—		—		—		20	6
Orlando Pride	2024	NWSL	23	6	—		3	0	—		0 (Note: NWSL x Liga MX Femenil Summer Cup)	0	26	6
Orlando Pride	Total		42	12	1	0	3	0	0	0	0	0	46	12
Al Qadsiah	2024–25	Saudi Women's Premier League	3	1	1	0	—		—		—		4	1
Career total			157	61	49	27	3	0	15	8	3	0	220	92

=== International ===
As of match played 27 February 2026

Appearances and goals by national team and year
National team	Year	Apps	Goals
Brazil	2017	4	1
Brazil	2018	5	0
Brazil	2019	4	0
Brazil	2020	2	0
Brazil	2021	7	2
Brazil	2022	17	9
Brazil	2023	13	0
Brazil	2024	15	3
Brazil	2025	3	0
Brazil	2026	1	1
Total		71	16

As of match played 27 February 2026
Scores and results list Brazil's goal tally first, score column indicates score after each Adriana goal.

List of international goals scored by Adriana
No.	Date	Venue	Opponent	Score	Result	Competition
1	24 October 2017	Yongchuan Sports Center, Chongqing, China	China	2–0	2–2	2017 Yongchuan International Tournament
2	18 February 2021	Exploria Stadium, Orlando, United States	Argentina	3–0	4–1	2021 SheBelieves Cup
3	23 October 2021	Western Sydney Stadium, Sydney, Australia	Australia	1–2	1–3	Friendly
4	9 July 2022	Estadio Centenario, Armenia, Colombia	Argentina	1–0	4–0	2022 Copa América
5	9 July 2022	Estadio Centenario, Armenia, Colombia	Argentina	3–0	4–0	2022 Copa América
6	12 July 2022	Estadio Centenario, Armenia, Colombia	Uruguay	1–0	3–0	2022 Copa América
7	12 July 2022	Estadio Centenario, Armenia, Colombia	Uruguay	3–0	3–0	2022 Copa América
8	21 July 2022	Estadio Olímpico Pascual Guerrero, Cali, Colombia	Peru	6–0	6–0	2022 Copa América
9	2 September 2022	Orlando Stadium, Johannesburg, South Africa	South Africa	2–0	3–0	Friendly
10	5 September 2022	Orlando Stadium, Johannesburg, South Africa	South Africa	1–0	6–0	Friendly
11	7 October 2022	Ullevaal Stadion, Oslo, Norway	Norway	1–0	4–1	Friendly
12	10 October 2022	Stadio Luigi Ferraris, Genoa, Italy	Italy	1–0	1–0	Friendly
13	6 March 2024	Snapdragon Stadium, San Diego, United States	Mexico	1–0	3–0	2024 CONCACAF W Gold Cup
14	1 June 2024	Arena Pernambuco, Recife, Brazil	Jamaica	1–0	4–0	Friendly
15	6 August 2024	Stade Vélodrome, Marseille, France	Spain	3–0	4–2	2024 Summer Olympics
16	27 February 2026	Estadio Alejandro Morera Soto, Alajuela, Costa Rica	Costa Rica	4–2	5–2	Friendly

== Honors ==
Rio Preto

- Campeonato Paulista: 2016, 2017

Corinthians

- Campeonato Brasileiro Série A1: 2018, 2020, 2021, 2022
- Campeonato Paulista: 2019, 2020, 2021
- Copa Libertadores: 2019, 2021
- Supercopa do Brasil: 2022

Orlando Pride

- NWSL Shield: 2024
- NWSL Championship: 2024

Brazil

- Yongchuan International Tournament: 2017
- Torneio Internacional de Futebol: 2021
- Copa América: 2022
- Summer Olympics silver medal: 2024
