= 2020 Campeonato Paulista de Futebol Feminino =

Campeonato Paulista de Futebol Feminino
- Season: 2020
- Dates: 17 October – 20 December 2020
- Champions: Corinthians
- Matches: 44
- Goals: 218 (4.95 per match)

The Paulista Football Championship of 2020 will be the 28th edition of this championship women's football organized by the Paulista Football Federation (FPF). Played between October and December, the competition will have twelve participants.

== Format ==
The 2020 Campeonato Paulista de Futebol Feminino will be held in four stages:

In the first, the twelve are divided into 2 groups of 6 teams, facing each other home and away, with the four best in each group qualifying to the next round. From then on, the competition will be played as single eliminatory games, with the winners advancing to the semifinals and then to the final

=== Tiebreaker criteria ===
In the case of tie between two and more teams the following criteria will be used:

- Number of wins
- Goal difference
- Goals Scored
- Fewer red cards received
- Fewer yellow cards received
- Drawing of lots

== Teams ==
Team	City
Realidade Jovem	São José do Rio Preto
Red Bull Bragantino	Bragança Paulista
Corinthians	São Paulo
Ferroviaria	Araraquara
Juventus	São Paulo
Taboão da Serra	Taboão da Serra
Nacional-SP	São Paulo
Palmeiras	São Paulo
Santos	São Paulo
São José	File:Bandeira de São José dos Campos.svg São José dos Campos
São Paulo	São Paulo
Taubaté	Taubaté

== Standings ==
=== Group A ===
Pos	Team	Pld	W	D	L	GF	GA	GD	Pts	Qualification
1	São Paulo	5	4	0	1	45	3	+42	12	Advance to Quarter-final
2	Ferroviaria	5	4	0	1	28	4	+24	12	Advance to Quarter-final
3	Palmeiras	5	3	1	1	28	3	+25	10	Advance to Quarter-final
4	RB Bragantino	5	2	1	2	15	7	+8	7	Advance to Quarter-final
5	Realidade Jovem	5	1	0	4	3	32	−29	3	
6	Taboao Serra	5	0	0	5	1	71	−70	0	

Updated to match(es) played on 11 November 2020. Source: Globo
Rules for classification: 1) points; 2) wins; 3) goal difference; 4) goals scored; 5) head-to-head results (only between 2 teams); 6) fewest red cards; 7) fewest yellow cards; 8) draw.

=== Group B ===
Pos	Team	Pld	W	D	L	GF	GA	GD	Pts	Qualification
1	Corinthians	5	5	0	0	25	1	+24	15	Advance to Quarter-final
2	Sao Jose	5	3	1	1	13	6	+7	10	Advance to Quarter-final
3	Taubate	5	2	2	1	7	8	−1	8	Advance to Quarter-final
4	Santos	5	2	1	2	9	7	+2	7	Advance to Quarter-final
5	Nacional SP	5	1	0	4	2	22	−20	3	
6	Juventus	5	0	0	5	3	15	−12	0	

Updated to match(es) played on 12 November 2020. Source: Globo
Rules for classification: 1) points; 2) wins; 3) goal difference; 4) goals scored; 5) head-to-head results (only between 2 teams); 6) fewest red cards; 7) fewest yellow cards; 8) draw.

== Knock-out stage ==
=== Bracket ===
Quarterfinals
São Paulo	0	1	1
RB Bragantino	1	1	2
Ferroviária	4	1	5
Taubaté	1	0	1
Corinthians	5	0	5
Santos	2	2	4
São José	0	0	0
Palmeiras	2	1	3

Semifinals
RB Bragantino	0	0	0
Ferroviária	0	4	4
Corinthians	1	2	3
Palmeiras	0	2	2

Finals
Ferroviária	1	0	1
Corinthians	3	5	8

=== Quarter-finals ===
Team 1	Agg.	Team 2	1st leg	2nd leg
RB Bragantino	2 - 1	São Paulo	1-0	1-1
São José	0 - 3	Palmeiras	0-2	1-0
Santos	4 - 5	Corinthians	2-5	2-0
Taubate	1 - 5	Ferroviaria	1-4	0-1

18 November 2020
15:00

RB Bragantino	1-0	São Paulo
Andressa Lodi 49'	Report

CFA Red Bull Brazil, Jarinu, Brazil
Attendance: 0
26 November 2020
19:00

São Paulo	1-1	RB Bragantino
Giovana 13'	Report	Rosane 55'(P)

Centro de Formação de Atletas Presidente Laudo Natel, São Paulo, Brazil
Attendance: 0

RB Bragantino won 2-1 on aggregate and advanced to the semi-finals.

19 November 2020
17:00

São José	0-2	Palmeiras
	Report	Ary Borges 2', 58'

Estádio Martins Pereira, São José, Brazil
Attendance: 0
28 November 2020
11:00

Palmeiras	1-0	São José
Ariadina 72'	Report

Estádio Nelo Bracalente, São Paulo, Brazil
Attendance: 0

Palmeiras won 3-0 on aggregate and advanced to the semi-finals.

19 November 2020
19:00

Santos	2-5	Corinthians
Cristiane 68'(P); Amanda Gutierres 72'	Report	Gabi Nunes 27', 43'; Victoria 35'(P); Grazi 59'; Cacau 89'

Estádio Urbano Caldeira, Santos, Brazil
Attendance: 0
27 November 2020
19:00

Corinthians	0-2	Santos
	Report	Amanda Gutierres 46'; Cristiane 49'

Estádio Parque São Jorge, São Paulo, Brazil
Attendance: 0

Corinthians won 5-4 on aggregate and advanced to the semi-finals.

22 November 2020
11:00

Taubate	1-4	Ferroviaria
Leidiane 84'	Report	Aline Milene 40'; Rafa Mineira 45+1'; Barrinha 47', 51'

Dario Rodrigues Leite, Guaratinguetá, Brazil
Attendance: 0
26 November 2020
17:00

Ferroviaria	1-0	Taubate
Amanda Brunner 55'	Report

Estádio Fonte Luminosa, Araraquara, Brazil
Attendance: 0

Ferroviaria won 5-1 on aggregate and advanced to the semi-finals.

=== Semi-finals ===
Team 1	Agg.	Team 2	1st leg	2nd leg
Ferroviaria	4 - 0	RB Bragantino	0-0	4-0
Corinthians	3 - 2	Palmeiras	1-0	2-2

3 December 2020
15:00

RB Bragantino	0-0	Ferroviaria
	Report

CFA Red Bull Brazil, Jarinu, Brazil
Attendance: 0
6 December 2020
11:00

Ferroviaria	4-0	RB Bragantino
Patrícia Sochor 31'; Chú Santos 70', 85'; Aline Milene 82'	Report

Estádio Fonte Luminosa, Araraquara, Brazil
Attendance: 0

Ferroviaria won 4-0 on aggregate and advanced to the final.

2 December 2020
15:00

Palmeiras	0-1	Corinthians
	Report	Gabi Nunes 64'

Estádio Nelo Bracalente, São Paulo, Brazil
Attendance: 0
10 December 2020
16:00

Corinthians	2-2	Palmeiras
Gabi Zanotti 57'; Giovanna Crivelari 60'	Report	Janaina 44'; Ary Borges 66'

Arena Barueri, Barueri, Brazil
Attendance: 0

Corinthians won 3-2 on aggregate and advanced to the final.

=== Final ===
Team 1	Agg.	Team 2	1st leg	2nd leg
Ferroviaria	1 – 8	Corinthians	1-3	0–5

13 December 2020
13:00

Corinthians	3-1	Ferroviaria
Victoria 85' (pen.), 90+2'; Diany 88'	Report	Chú Santos 43'

Arena Barueri, Barueri, Brazil
Attendance: 0
20 December 2020
11:00

Ferroviaria	0-5	Corinthians
		Giovanna 12'; Érika 21'; Tamires 37'; Diany 40'; Grazielle 77'

Estádio Fonte Luminosa, Araraquara, Brazil
Attendance: 0
