= Suzana Agostini =

Brazilian footballer (1982–2025)

Personal information
- Full name: Suzana Aparecida de Agostini
- Date of birth: 1 January 1982
- Place of birth: Itapuí, São Paulo, Brazil
- Date of death: 14 September 2025 (aged 43)
- Place of death: Itapuí, São Paulo, Brazil
- Height: 1.72 m (5 ft 8 in)
- Position: Midfielder

Senior career*
Years	Team	Apps	(Gls)
2003–2005	Rio Preto		
2006–2011	Santos		
2012–2018	Rio Preto		
2019	Ponte Preta		
2020	Avaí/Kindermann		
2021	Realidade Jovem		
- * Club domestic league appearances and goals

Suzana Aparecida de Agostini (1 January 1982 – 14 September 2025) was a Brazilian professional footballer who played as a midfielder. She spent the majority of her career with Rio Preto and Santos, scoring 78 goals for the latter.

== Club career ==
Agostini began her football career in 1999 with Juventude, a club in São José do Rio Preto. After a stint with Rio Preto, she joined Santos in 2006.

Agostini was part of one of the Sereias da Vila's golden eras, from 2006 to 2011, playing alongside Marta and Cristiane, winning major titles such as the Copa Libertadores, the Copa do Brasil, and the Campeonato Paulista.

She also made history at Rio Preto, where she played from 2012 to 2018, winning the Campeonato Paulista twice (2016 and 2017), the Série A1 in 2015, and finishing second in the Série A1 twice, in 2017 and 2018.

Agostini also played for Ponte Preta and Avaí/Kindermann. She retired from playing in 2021, after a season with Realidade Jovem.

== International career ==
Agostini represented the Brazilian national team in the Queen Peace Cup, held in South Korea in 2006.

== Death ==
In August 2025, Agostini discovered she had advanced-stage uterine cancer, as well as signs of metastasis in her lung. She died on 14 September 2025, from complications from uterine cancer. She was 43.

== Honours ==
Santos

- Copa Libertadores: 2009, 2010
- Torneio Internacional Interclubes: 2011
- Copa do Brasil: 2008, 2009
- Campeonato Paulista: 2007, 2010, 2011

Rio Preto

- Campeonato Brasileiro: 2015
- Campeonato Paulista: 2016, 2017
