= Mariana Santos =

Brazilian footballer

Personal information
- Full name: Mariana dos Santos Almeida
- Date of birth: 24 February 1998 (age 28)
- Place of birth: Rio de Janeiro , Brazil
- Position: Forward

Team information
- Current team: Ferroviária

Senior career*
Years	Team	Apps	(Gls)
2016	Vasco da Gama	3	(0)
2018	Vitória das Tabocas	3	(0)
2019	Ponte Preta	27	(10)
- Botafogo
2020–2022	Cruzeiro	34	(11)
2021–2022	→ Beşiktaş (loan)	9	(2)
2023–2024	São Paulo	18	(5)
2025–	Ferroviária		
- * Club domestic league appearances and goals as of 18:50, 25 April 2024 (UTC)

Mariana dos Santos Almeida (born 24 February 1998) is a Brazilian women's association football forward who plays for Ferroviária.

== Early life ==
Mariana dos Santos Almeida was born in Rio de Janeiro, Brazil on 24 February 1998.

== Playing career ==
=== Career beginnings ===
She played in her country for the clubs CR Vasco da Gama (2016) AAD Vitória das Tabocas (2018), and AA Ponte Preta (2019). Mariana Santos made her league debut for Vasco da Gama against Rio Preto on 21 January 2016.

Mariana Santos made her league debut for Vitória das Tabocas against Foz Cataratas on 22 June 2018.

Mariana Santos made her league debut for Ponte Preta against Corinthians on 16 March 2019. She scored her first league goals against Sport Recife on 15 May 2019, scoring in the 19th and 22nd minute.

=== Cruzeiro ===
She was with Botafogo FR, before she became a member of Cruzeiro EC (2020–2021), Mariana Santos made her league debut against Grêmio on 29 August 2020. She scored her first goal against EC Vitória on 10 September 2020, scoring in the 49th minute. Mariana Santos' contract with Cruzeiro EC was renewed under the condition that she will be loaned out to the Istanbul-based club Beşiktaş J.K. She will return to Brazil after the 2021–22 Turkcell Super League season.

=== Beşiktaş ===
She joined Beşiktaş J.K. in the beginning of August 2021, and played in two matches of the 2021–22 UEFA Women's Champions League qualifying rounds.

On 10 March 2022, she left Turkey.

=== São Paulo ===
Mariana Santos made her league debut against Bahia on 25 February 2023. She scored her first league goal against Athletico Paranaense on 21 May 2023, scoring in the 30th minute.

=== Ferroviária ===
In January 2025, she joined Ferroviária.
