= 2021 Campeonato Paulista de Futebol Feminino =

Women's football competition in Brazil

Campeonato Paulista de Futebol Feminino
- Season: 2021
- Dates: 11 August – 5 December 2021
- Champions: Corinthians
- Matches: 72
- Goals: 252 (3.5 per match)
- Top goalscorer: (Brazil) Adriana (Brazil) Miriã (8 goals each)

The Paulista Football Championship of 2021 was the 29th edition of this championship women's football organized by the Paulista Football Federation (FPF). Played between August and December, the competition will have twelve participants.

== Format ==
The 2021 Campeonato Paulista de Futebol Feminino was held in three stages:

In the first stage, the twelve teams were placed in a single group. Each team in the group played each other, and the four teams at the top of the table advanced to the semifinals. The teams that finished 5th through 8th place competed in the Copa Paulista.

In the semifinal phase, the top 4 teams were placed in two groups of two, with the first group containing the 2nd and 3rd placed teams and the second group containing the first and fourth placed teams. Each team played one home match and one away match. The teams from each group with the most points after two matches qualified for the finals. The semifinal groups followed the same tiebreaker criteria as the group stage.

The final phase was disputed by the top finishers of the two semifinal groups. The two teams each played a home and away match to determine the winner. The final group phase followed the same tiebreaker criteria as the semifinal phase and the group stage.

=== Tiebreaker criteria ===
In the case of tie between two and more teams the following criteria will be used:

- Number of wins
- Goal difference
- Goals Scored
- Fewer red cards received
- Fewer yellow cards received
- Drawing of lots

== Teams ==
Team	City
Realidade Jovem	São José do Rio Preto
Red Bull Bragantino	Bragança Paulista
Corinthians	São Paulo
Ferroviaria	Araraquara
Portuguesa	São Paulo
Pinda	Pindamonhangaba
Nacional-SP	São Paulo
Palmeiras	São Paulo
Santos	São Paulo
São José	São José dos Campos
São Paulo	São Paulo
Taubaté	Taubaté

== Standings ==
Pos	Team	Pld	W	D	L	GF	GA	GD	Pts	Qualification
1	Corinthians	11	10	1	0	47	3	+44	31	Advance to Semi-final
2	São Paulo	11	10	0	1	34	6	+28	30	Advance to Semi-final
3	Santos	11	8	1	2	34	6	+28	25	Advance to Semi-final
4	Ferroviaria	11	9	0	2	27	11	+16	27	Advance to Semi-final
5	Palmeiras	11	6	1	4	28	10	+18	19	
6	São José	11	6	0	5	17	16	+1	18	
7	RB Bragantino	11	4	1	6	17	8	+9	13	
8	Taubaté	11	4	1	6	12	17	−5	13	
9	Realidade Jovem	11	1	3	7	3	38	−35	6	
10	Pinda SC	11	1	1	9	4	41	−37	4	
11	Nacional-SP	11	1	1	9	6	44	−38	4	
12	Portuguesa	11	1	0	10	7	36	−29	3	

Updated to match(es) played on 1 November 2021. Source: FPF
Rules for classification: 1) points; 2) wins; 3) goal difference; 4) goals scored; 5) head-to-head results (only between 2 teams); 6) fewest red cards; 7) fewest yellow cards; 8) draw.

== Bracket ==
Semi-finals
São Paulo	1	4	5
Santos	0	0	0
Corinthians	1	4	5
Ferroviária	0	1	1

Finals
Corinthians	0	3	3
São Paulo	1	1	2

== Semifinals ==
=== Semi-finals ===
Team 1	Agg.	Team 2	1st leg	2nd leg
São Paulo	5 - 0	Santos	0-1	4-0
Corinthians	5 - 1	Ferroviária	0-1	4-1

17 October 2021
11:00

Santos	0-1	São Paulo
		Lauren 90+4'

1 November 2021
17:00

São Paulo	4-0	Santos
Carol 25'; Yaya 45+2', 52'; Gláucia 62'

São Paulo won 5-0 on aggregate and advanced to the final.

16 October 2021
21:00

Ferroviária	0-1	Corinthians
		Gabi Zanotti 55'

31 October 2021
16:00

Corinthians	4-1	Ferroviária
Adriana 45+3', 90+2(p)' Gabi Zanotti 51'; Vic 69'		Carol Tavares 65'

Corinthians won 5-1 on aggregate and advanced to the final.

== Final ==
Team 1	Agg.	Team 2	1st leg	2nd leg
Corinthians	3 – 2	São Paulo	1-0	3–1

4 December 2021
16:00

São Paulo	1-0	Corinthians
Micaelly 64'

Estádio do Morumbi, Morumbi, Brazil
8 December 2021
21:00

Corinthians	3-1	São Paulo
Gabi Zanotti 24', 33'; Adriana 90+1'		Naná 45+2'

Arena Barueri, Barueri, Brazil

== Top goalscorers ==
Rank	Player	Club	Goals
1	(Brazil) Adriana	Corinthians	8
1	(Brazil) Miriã	Corinthians	8
2	(Brazil) Byanca	Santos	7
2	(Brazil) Gláucia	São Paulo	7
4	(Brazil) Gabi Zanotti	Corinthians	6
4	(Brazil) Jheniffer	Corinthians	6
4	(Brazil) Juliana	São José	6
4	(Brazil) Carol Nogueira	São Paulo	6
4	(Brazil) Yaya	São Paulo	6
