= 2001 Campeonato Paulista de Futebol Feminino =

Women's football competition in Brazil

Campeonato Paulista de Futebol Feminino
- Season: 2001
- Dates: 14 October – 16 December 2001
- Champions: Palmeiras
- Matches: 69
- Goals: 283 (4.1 per match)
- Top goalscorer: (Brazil) Alessandra (Guarani) (Brazil) Tiganinha (Portuguesa) (10 goals each)
- Biggest home win: Santos 7–0 São Bento
- Biggest away win: São Bento 1–10 Portuguesa
- Highest scoring: Portuguesa 9–4 São Paulo

The 2001 Campeonato Paulista de Futebol Feminino was the sixth edition of the São Paulo state championship for women's football, and the first to be organized directly by the Federação Paulista de Futebol (FPF). This edition was organized in conjunction with Pelé Sports & Marketing. Played between October and December 2001, the competition had twelve participant clubs made up of under-23 players, who were selected partly on the basis of their beauty. Palmeiras was the champion after beating Matonense in the final, winning their first ever title on this tournament.

== Competition ==
=== Background ===
In the aftermath of the Brazil women's national football team's failure to secure a medal at the 2000 Sydney Olympics, several leading players moved from domestic Brazilian clubs to the new Women's United Soccer Association (WUSA) in the United States. An attendant collapse in sponsorship and funding led to clubs including São Paulo FC closing their professional women's sections. The women's football scene in Brazil remained conspicuously underdeveloped: lacking visibility, resources and proper structure.

The previous four editions of the Campeonato Paulista de Futebol Feminino had been run by a private company, Sport Promotion. Relatively high player wages and unbalanced competition caused by all the top players clustering at small number of clubs contributed to the discontinuation of that arrangement in 2000. The Federação Paulista de Futebol (FPF) partnered with Pelé Sports & Marketing to run the 2001 competition, although the latter was closed by Pelé during the season due to an unrelated scandal.

=== Player selection ===
The revamped 2001 edition of the Campeonato Paulista became notorious as "one of the most discriminatory sports championships ever" and "the most sexist championship ever". The FPF arranged for 1,620 players aged between 16 and 23 years old to attend a two-day trial at Estádio Ícaro de Castro Melo, from which 280 successful players would be assigned to the 12 teams.

An FPF 'technical commission', including retired ex-professionals Basílio, Wladimir and Clodoaldo, selected players on criteria which included their perceived physical attractiveness. Although organizers insisted that was not necessarily the only, or the overriding, factor which was considered. FPF Vice President Renato Duprat offered his reassurance: "If we have to choose an ugly girl who plays well or a pretty girl who plays so-so, we'll choose the ugly one. You can be sure."

To ensure competitive balance, the three clubs who still had adult women's football departments were only allowed to use players from their 'base categories' (youth teams), while all teams were only allowed one national team player each. The three clubs (Matonense, Guarani and Portuguesa) had wanted to keep their existing rosters instead of using the young players assigned to them from the FPF trials.

Players older than 23 years old, with short hair, and/or with dark skin were excluded, even national team players. This meant that some experienced professional players who had not moved to the United States and were now excluded at home were forced out of football altogether. Some were consigned to poverty, including Solange "Soró" Bastos who took a job as a cleaner.

Official promotional materials for the competition prominently featured actress Patrícia de Sabrit on the cover, alongside the slogan: "novo futebol feminino" (English: new women's football). Other exclusively young, white, long-haired girls appeared alongside Sabrit in the literature. One was shown embracing a man, apparently to emphasise her heterosexuality.

Some participants openly criticized the selection policy: organizers' poster girl Talita Cassiano, a 20-year-old student selected on the basis of a 20-minute trial appearance where she hardly touched the ball, called the process "preconceituoso" (English: prejudiced). Other players, coaches and administrators within women's football were more supportive as they felt public perceptions of women's football in Brazil had been negatively affected by a prevalence of unattractive lesbians.

Ten years later Juliana Cabral recalled that players had been given tight, revealing kit to wear, which was both "indecentes" and impractical in that it inhibited the players' movement.

A September 2001 Placar magazine article described the tournament as "estranho" (English: weird), outlining an outside perception that a "Ninfetão" (English: big championship of nymphets) had been created to ward off women's football's enduring image as an "esporte de sapatão" (English: sport for "big shoes" [i.e. butch lesbians]).

=== Finances ===
The FPF sourced around R$2m of funding for the tournament. The "big four" clubs (Santos, São Paulo, Corinthians and Palmeiras) got R$40,000 each and the other eight clubs R$20,000 each. Players were paid a maximum of R$2,000 and a minimum of R$300. The players' kits and the balls were provided by the Topper sportswear company.

=== Format ===
In the first stage, the twelve teams were placed in a single group. Each team in the group played each other once, and the four teams at the top of the table advanced to the semifinals.

In the semifinal phase, the top four teams were placed in two groups of two, with the first group containing the second and third placed teams and the second group containing the first and fourth placed teams. Each team played one match. The winner of each semifinal qualified for the final. The semifinal groups followed the same tiebreaker criteria as the group stage.

Each team was allowed to call one time-out per half, and drawn matches were followed by a penalty shootout to decide the points. A score draw gave the shootout winner two points and the loser one; a scoreless draw gave the shootout winner one point and the loser none. Matches still level after the shootout had the extra point assigned by a coin toss.

==== Tiebreaker criteria ====
In the case of tie between two and more teams the following criteria was used:

- Number of wins
- Goal difference
- Goals Scored
- Fewer red cards received
- Fewer yellow cards received
- Head-to-head record

== Standings ==
Pos	Team	Pld	W	PKW	PKL	L	GF	GA	GD	Pts	Qualification
1	Matonense	11	9	0	1	1	41	6	+35	28	Advance to Semi-final
2	Corinthians	11	7	1	1	2	24	12	+12	23	Advance to Semi-final
3	Palmeiras	11	6	3	0	2	22	11	+11	22	Advance to Semi-final
4	Guarani	11	6	1	2	2	28	18	+10	21	Advance to Semi-final
5	Juventus	11	6	1	1	3	21	15	+6	20	
6	Portuguesa	11	4	2	2	3	38	28	+10	18	
7	Santos	11	3	2	2	4	25	20	+5	14	
8	Ponte Preta	11	3	1	3	4	19	26	−7	12	
9	São Paulo	11	2	3	0	6	18	33	−15	12	
10	Nacional-SP	11	3	0	3	5	16	19	−3	10	
11	Taubaté	11	2	1	0	8	15	32	−17	8	
12	São Bento	11	0	0	0	11	7	54	−47	0	

Updated to match(es) played on 16 December 2001. Source: RSSSF
Rules for classification: 1) points; 2) wins; 3) goal difference; 4) goals scored; 5) head-to-head results (only between 2 teams); 6) fewest red cards; 7) fewest yellow cards; 8) draw.

== Bracket ==
Semi-finals
9 December
Corinthians	1
Palmeiras	4
9 December
Matonense	2
Guarani	0

Final
16 December – Estádio Ícaro de Castro Melo, São Paulo
Matonense	0
Palmeiras	1

== Semifinals ==
9 December 2001

Corinthians	1–4	Palmeiras

9 December 2001

Matonense	2–0	Guarani

== Final ==
A late goal from the captain, midfielder Zangão, secured the title for Palmeiras.

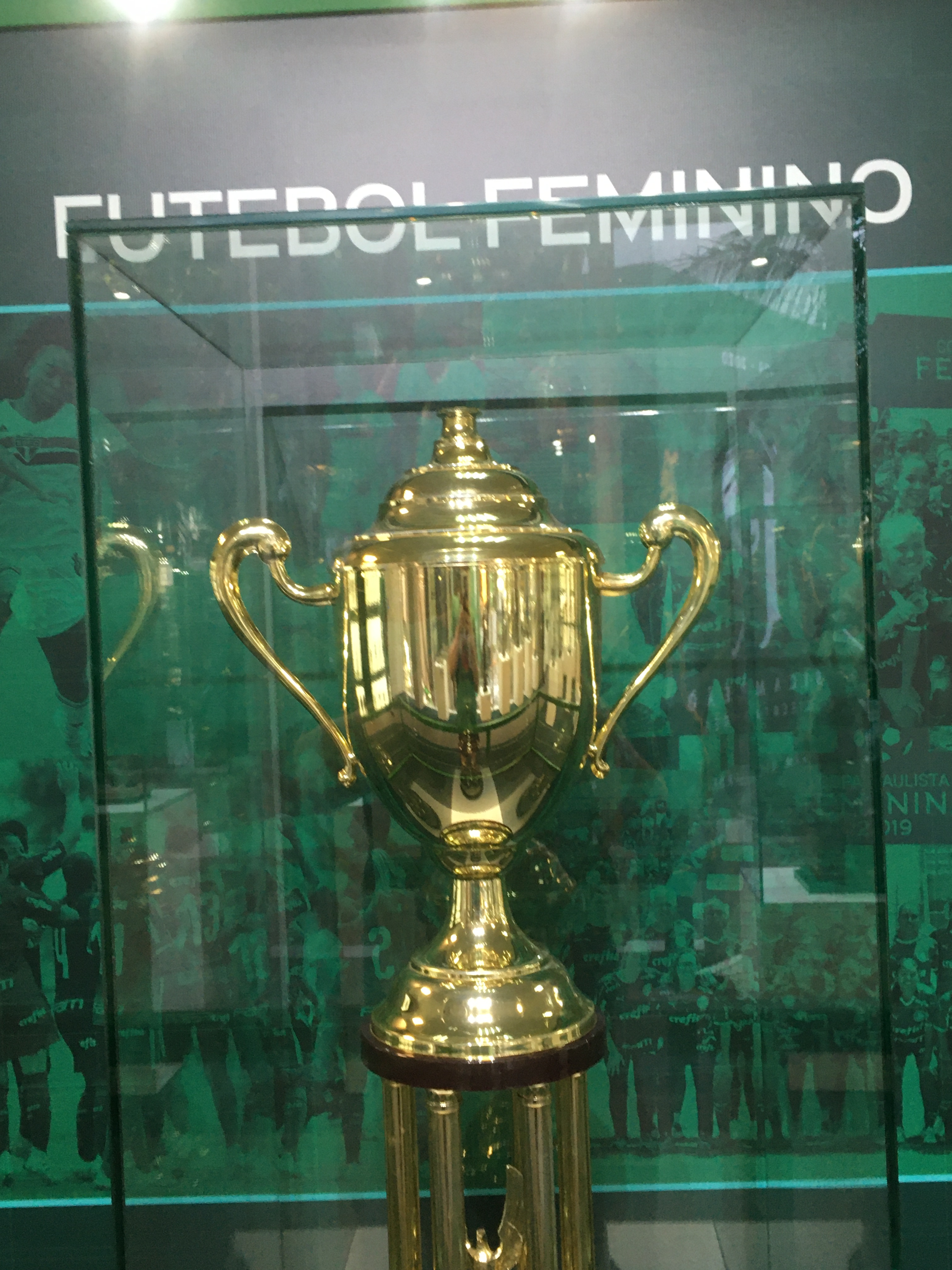
Trophy awarded to the champion Palmeiras

16 December 2001

Matonense	0–1	Palmeiras
	Report	Zangão 88'

Estádio Ícaro de Castro Melo, São Paulo, Brazil

== Top goalscorers ==
Rank	Player	Club	Goals
1	(Brazil) Alessandra	Guarani	10
1	(Brazil) Tiganinha	Portuguesa	10
2	(Brazil) Baby	Matonense	9
2	(Brazil) Bia	Matonense	9
2	(Brazil) Fabi	Portuguesa	9
2	(Brazil) Pernalonga	Palmeiras	9

== Aftermath ==
The tournament entered "falência" (English: bankruptcy) after 2001 and was not held again until 2004. In September 2017 the FPF publicly acknowledged that the 2001 edition had been "uma experiência ruim" (English: a bad experience), but stressed that it had been presided over by a previous administration. Also speaking in 2017, one of the victorious Palmeiras players – Liése Brancão – raised the possibility of punishment for the organizers, stating that the "absurdo" player selection criteria had escaped proper scrutiny at the time due to a lack of publicity around women's football.

Nevertheless, the winning Palmeiras coach Marcello Frigério remained proud of the success, particularly since it was achieved with an inexperienced team put together at very short notice. In 2021 he described it as one of the most important titles of his long coaching career: "It's something that, in a hundred years, people will still talk about".
