= Sociedade Esportiva Matonense =

Matonense
- Full name: Sociedade Esportiva Matonense
- Nicknames: SEMA; Águia azul
- Founded: 24 May 1976; 49 years ago
- Ground: Dr. Hudson Buck Ferreira
- Capacity: 8,758
- Head coach: Luis Carlos Martins
- League: Campeonato Paulista Segunda Divisão
- 2025: Paulista Série A4, 16th of 16 (relegated)
Home colours	Away colours

Sociedade Esportiva Matonense, more commonly referred to as Matonense, is a Brazilian football club based in Matão, São Paulo. The team compete in Campeonato Paulista Segunda Divisão, the fourth tier of the São Paulo state football league.

They competed in the Série A and in the Série C once.

== History ==
The club was founded on May 24, 1976. Matonense won the Campeonato Paulista Segunda Divisão in 1995, the Campeonato Paulista Série A3 in 1996, and the Campeonato Paulista Série A2 in 1997. The club competed in the Série C in 1998, when they were eliminated in the First Stage. Matonese reached the Second Stage of the White Module of the 2000 edition of the Série A, named Copa João Havelange.

In 2013, Matonense won, for the second time, the Campeonato Paulista Segunda Divisão. With the best campaign since the first stages of the championship, Matonense reached the final against Água Santa de Diadema. However, Matão's team was beaten in ABC Paulista by 5x2, forcing them to win an expressive victory by more than 3 goals difference and in a historic game, Matonense made 4x0 and guaranteed the second championship of the second division, after 18 years.

In 2014, Matonense guaranteed access to the A2 division of Paulistão together with the champion of this edition in the same group, Grêmio Novorizontino.

In 2015 Matonense was relegated in the Campeonato Paulista A2 division, ending the championship with 17 points, being in 18th place.

In 2016 the club returned to the A3 division, finishing the first phase in 5th place, with his technical team formed by trainer Pinho and as a technical assistant Anderson Florentino.

=== Women's team ===
In 2001 the club's women's team finished as runners-up in both the Campeonato Brasileiro and the controversial 2001 Campeonato Paulista de Futebol Feminino.

== Honours ==
- Campeonato Paulista Série A2
  - Winners (1): 1997
- Campeonato Paulista Série A3
  - Winners (1): 1996
- Campeonato Paulista Série A4
  - Winners (2): 1995, 2013

== Stadium ==
Sociedade Esportiva Matonense play their home games at Estádio Hudson Buck Pereira. The stadium has a maximum capacity of 8,758 people.
