= CT Rei Pelé =

Training facility of Brazilian football club

Centro de Treinamento Rei Pelé
- CT Rei Pelé
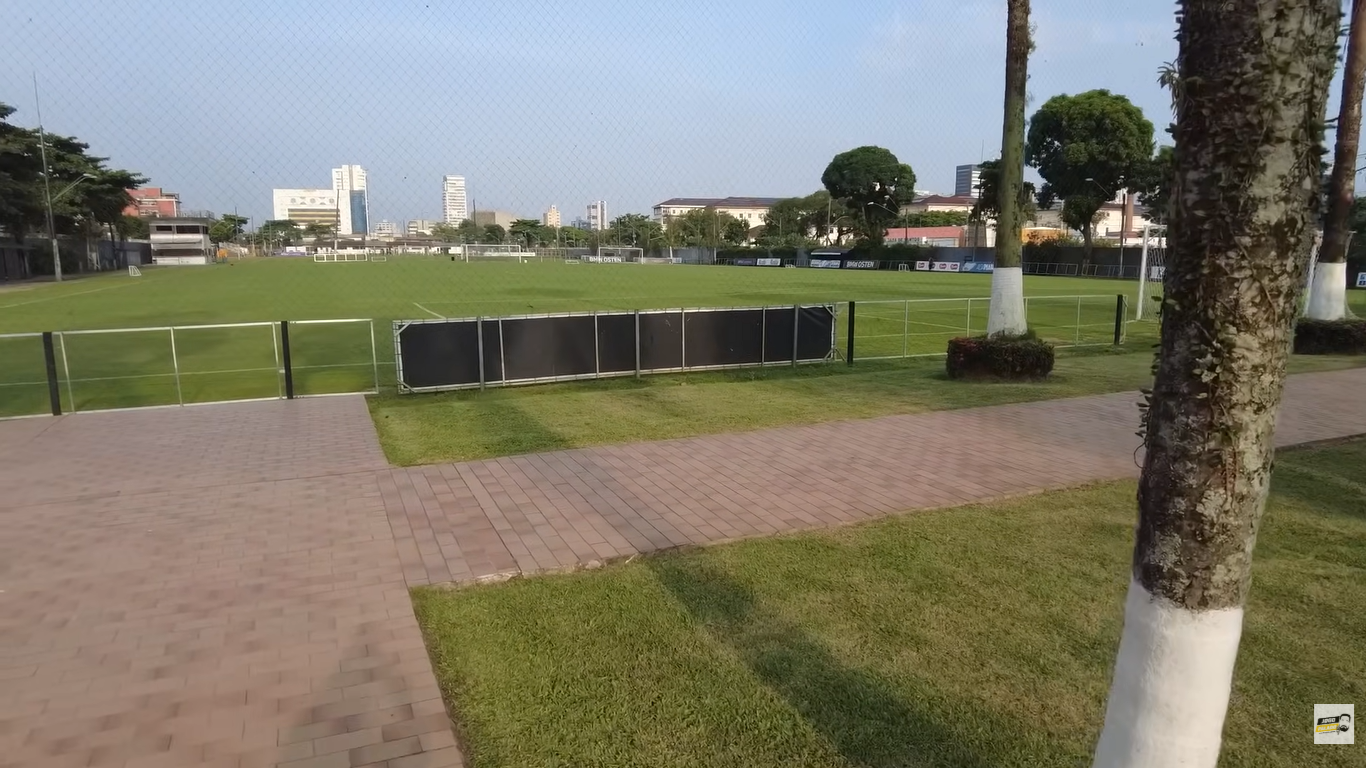
- CT Rei Pelé in 2024
- Interactive map of Centro de Treinamento Rei Pelé
- Address: Rua Francisco Manoel, w/n Gate 1 – Jabaquara – Santos (SP)
- Location: Santos (SP)
- Coordinates: 23.9425°S 46.3388°W
- Owner: Santos FC
- Type: Football training ground

Construction
- Opened: 2005

Website
- official website

Centro de Treinamento Rei Pelé (English: King Pele Training Center), commonly referred to as simply CT Rei Pelé, is the training facility of the Brazilian professional football club Santos. Built in 2005, it is named as a tribute to Pelé, the Brazilian football legend.

It is one of the most modern training centers in the world and contains a five star hotel (Hotel Recanto dos Alvinegros), three full size football pitches and a Physical Rehabilitation Centre (CEPRAF).

== Field ==
CT Rei Pelé has three fields with official dimensions, where the main team of Santos FC hold their workouts. The smallest has a capacity for 5000 people. The second has the same dimensions of the Estádio Urbano Caldeira (Santos' stadium) and the third has the dimensions of the stadium Morumbi.

The facility includes the Peirão Castro media center. On the first floor is the press conference room, where players and coaches give interviews. The second floor has Internet access to facilitate the sending of photos and news by journalists to their companies. The top floor is devoted to capturing images. In a wide area, overlooking the entire CT Pele, are camera filming activities.

== CEPRAF ==
Opened in January 2007, the Center for Excellence in Prevention and Recovery of Athletes Soccer (in Portuguese: CEPRAF) has top level equipment. The facility allows medical staff to work in an integrated way, facilitating recovery and injury prevention.

As part of the structure of the CEPRAF physical therapy, weight room, the living room physiology and Isokinetic dynamometry is considered the flagship of Santos' structure.

== CT Meninos da Vila ==
Another option for training is the CT Meninos da Vila, located at the entrance to the city. Like all Santos FC pitches, the lawns of the CT Meninos da Vila are clean and very well maintained.

Opened in late 2006, there are two pitches with official measures. It is used by Santos' youth team. The fields are named Diego and Robinho, in honor of two Santos players.
