= União, Piauí =

Coordinates: 4.58583°S 42.8639°W

- Municipality
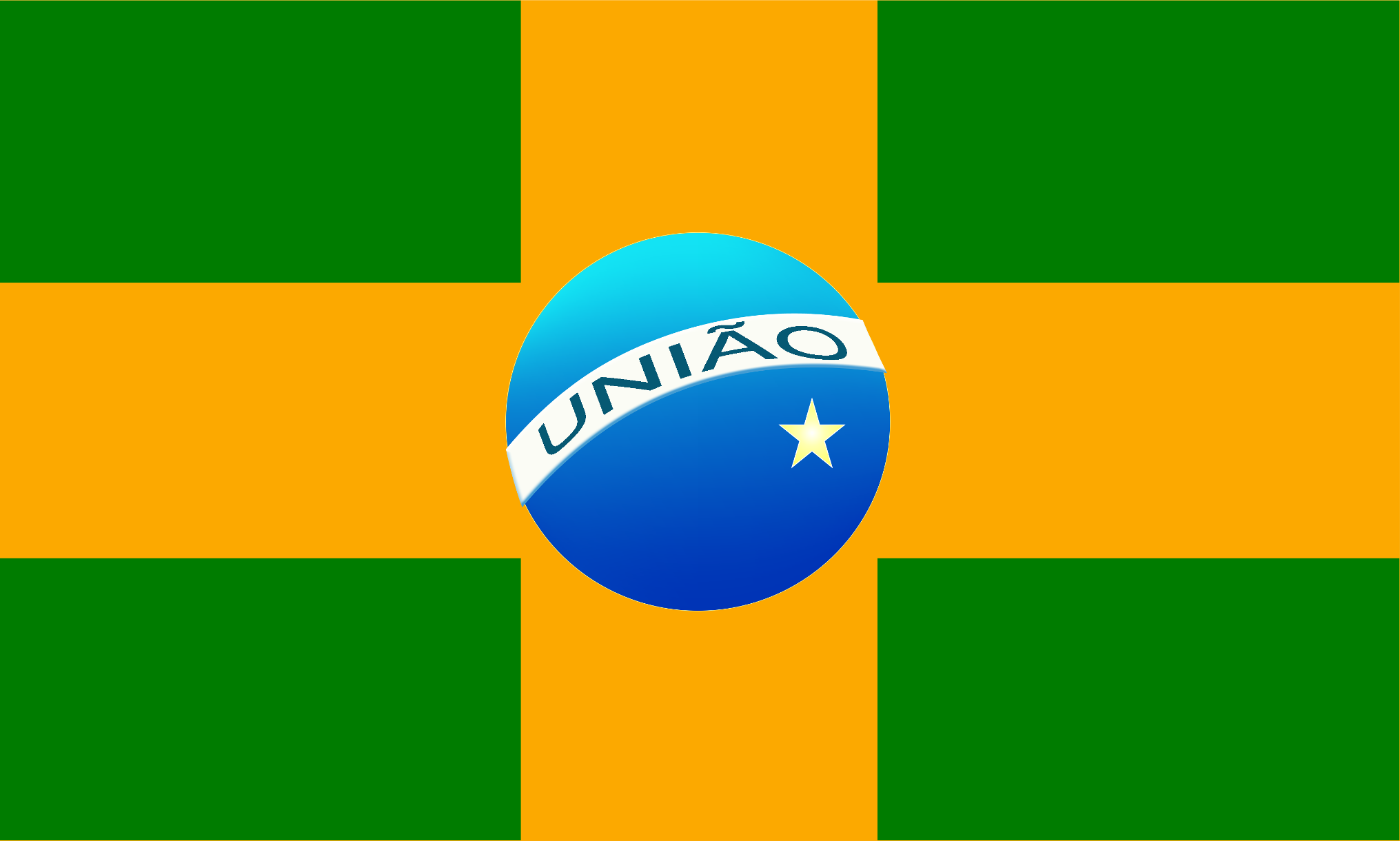
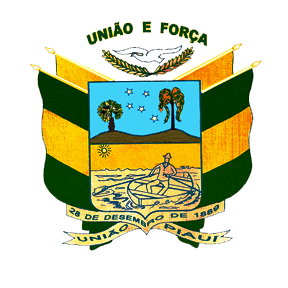
- Flag Coat of arms

- Location in Piauí
- Country: Brazil
- Region: Nordeste
- State: Piauí
- Mesoregion: Centro-Norte Piauiense

Area
  - Total: 453.070 sq mi (1,173.447 km^{2})

Population (2020)
  - Total: 44,569
- Time zone: UTC−3 (BRT)

União, Piauí is a municipality in the state of Piauí in the Northeast region of Brazil. As of 2010, União had a population of 44,569.

== See also ==
- List of municipalities in Piauí
