= Adriane (footballer) =

Brazilian footballer (born 1988)

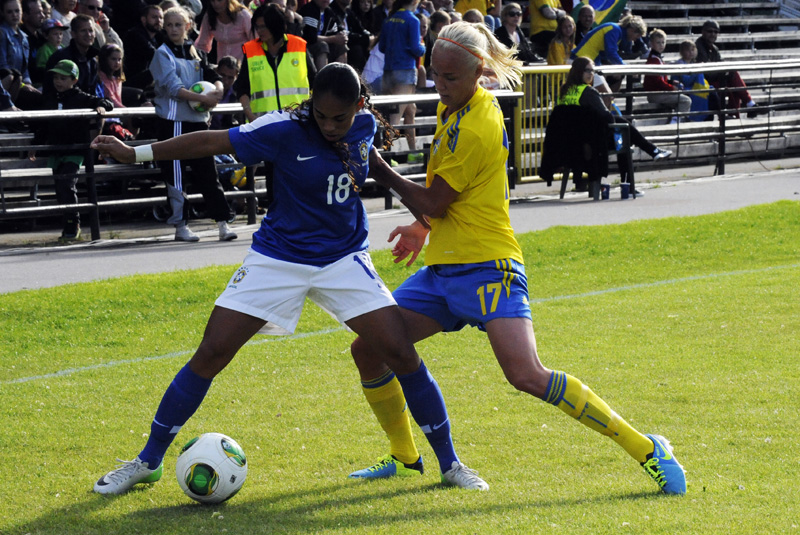
- Adriane (18) holds off Caroline Seger

Personal information
- Full name: Adriane dos Santos
- Date of birth: 20 July 1988 (age 38)
- Place of birth: Ji-Paraná, Rondônia, Brazil
- Height: 5 ft 5 in (1.65 m)
- Positions: Midfielder; forward

Team information
- Current team: Ferroviária
- Number: 90

Senior career*
Years	Team	Apps	(Gls)
2006	São Caetano		
2007	Santos		
2008	Botucatu		
2009	FC Gold Pride	12	(1)
2010	Foz Cataratas		
2011	Francana		
2011–2012	Foz Cataratas		
2013	Ferroviária		
2013	São José		
2014–2015	Ferroviária		
2016–2018	Corinthians	65	(5)
2019-	Ferroviária	24	(0)

International career^{‡}
- Brazil U-20
- Brazil
- * Club domestic league appearances and goals as of 15:30, 29 August 2020 (UTC) ‡ National team caps and goals as of 17:44, 15 December 2013 (UTC)

Adriane dos Santos (born 20 July 1988), commonly known as Adriane or Nenê, is a Brazilian football forward who plays for Ferroviária and the Brazil women's national football team. She previously played in the United States for FC Gold Pride of Women's Professional Soccer.

== Club career ==
In November 2013, Adriane left Ferroviária to sign for 2013 Copa Libertadores Femenina winners São José.

In the 2015 Copa Libertadores Femenina, she played for Ferroviária again.

== Career statistics ==
=== Club career ===
Team	Season	League	Domestic League					Domestic Playoffs					Total				
Team	Season	League	Apps	Starts	Minutes	Goals	Assists	Apps	Starts	Minutes	Goals	Assists	Apps	Starts	Minutes	Goals	Assists
FC Gold Pride	2009	WPS	12	4	451	1	1	–	–	–	–	–	12	4	451	1	1
		Total	12	4	451	1	1	–	–	–	–	–	12	4	451	1	1
