= Chú Santos =

Brazilian footballer (born 1990)

Personal information
- Full name: Francisleide dos Santos Barbosa
- Date of birth: February 27, 1990 (age 36)
- Place of birth: Rio de Janeiro, Brazil
- Position: Forward

Team information
- Current team: Palmeiras
- Number: 11

Senior career*
Years	Team	Apps	(Gls)
2007–2008	CEPE-Caxias		
2008	Benfica-Mg		
2009	Saad Esporte Clube		
2010	Ferroviária		
2011	São José Esporte Clube		
2011	Santos FC		
2012	Centro Olímpico		
2013	Suwon FMC WFC		
2014–2015	São José Esporte Clube	13	(11)
2016–2017	Corinthians/Audax	8	(1)
2017	Fortuna Hjørring	2	(0)
2017	São Jose	6	(2)
2018	Santos	13	(7)
2019	Changchun Zhuoyue	0	(0)
2020	Ferroviaria	17	(4)
2021–	Palmeiras	19	(5)

International career^{‡}
2012–	Brazil	13	(0)
- * Club domestic league appearances and goals as of 17:20, 18 September 2021 (UTC) ‡ National team caps and goals as of November 6, 2017

Francisleide dos Santos Barbosa (born February 27, 1990), known as Chú Santos or Chú, is a Brazilian professional footballer who plays as a forward for the Brazil women's national football team and Palmeiras in Brazil.

== Club career ==
Francisleide dos Santos Barbosa was born in Rio de Janeiro, Brazil, on February 27, 1990. She is better known as Chú Santos, or simply Chú. When she was seven years old, Santos told her grandfather that she enjoyed playing football; in response, he took her to a training school. She was initially told that the sport was only for boys, but Santos continued to pursue her career. She was part of the São José Esporte Clube team which won the International Women's Club Championship, defeating English team Arsenal W.F.C. in the final. This was the first time that a Brazilian team had won the competition.

In 2015, she was named as part of the initial squad of the shared women's team between Sport Club Corinthians Paulista and Grêmio Osasco Audax Esporte Clube, known as Corinthians / Audax. When the team made their debut in the Copa do Brasil de Futebol Feminino, Santos scored five times in the 9–0 defeat of Pinheirense Esporte Clube. Santos scored a further two goals in the next two games in the tournament, The team went on to win the tournament, with Santos recording twelve goals during the single tournament, making her a top scorer. The record for number of goals scored in the tournament, is held by Marta, with 18.

She was then signed by Danish club Fortuna Hjørring, whose manager, Brian Sørensen, described her as "a complete player". During her time in Denmark, she only played in two matches; both legs of the quarter-final of the UEFA Women's Champions League against Manchester City W.F.C. of England. Santos then resigned for Sao Jose.

== International career ==
Santos was first called up to the Brazil women's national football team at the age of 21 in 2012 as part of the main selection round of the team for the 2012 Summer Olympics in London, England.

== Personal life ==
In 2021, Santos garnered much criticism for mocking the death of recently deceased Brazilian actor Paulo Gustavo. She commented on Facebook that Gustavo was in hell, alluding to his homosexuality as the reason. Brazil teammates Marta, Tamires, Cristiane, and many of her club teammates publicly criticized Santos' comments. Shortly after her comments made national news, Santos released a public apology, saying she spoke on an impulse. Her club team, Palmeiras, released a statement saying they would deal with the matter internally.

== Career statistics ==
Goal	Date	Location	Opponent	#	Score	Result	Competition
1	2019-11-07	Chongqing, China	Canada	1.1	1–0	4–0	2019 Yongchuan International Tournament
