= Renata Diniz =

Brazilian footballer

Personal information
- Full name: Renata Fernandes dos Santos Diniz
- Date of birth: 1 November 1985 (age 41)
- Place of birth: Taboão da Serra, Brazil
- Height: 1.80 m (5 ft 11 in)
- Position: Defender

Senior career*
Years	Team	Apps	(Gls)
2002	Juventus		
2003	São Bernardo		
2004–2005	Santos		
2005	Hampton Roads Piranhas	12	(0)
2006–2011	Duque de Caxias		
2012–2015	São José		
2016	Tiradentes	4	(0)
2017–2022	Flamengo	20	(1)

International career^{‡}
- Brazil
- * Club domestic league appearances and goals as of 29 May 2022 ‡ National team caps and goals as of 20 September 2003 (before the 2003 FIFA Women's World Cup)

Renata Fernandes dos Santos Diniz (born 1 November 1985) is a Brazilian retired footballer who played as a defender. She was a member of the Brazil women's national football team, and a non-playing squad member at the 2003 FIFA Women's World Cup. She was also included in the national teams for the 2003 and 2011 editions of the Pan American Games.

== Club career ==
In 2005 Diniz moved to the United States and played 12 games for Hampton Roads Piranhas of the pro–am W-League.

== International career ==
=== Youth ===
Diniz played for the Brazil women's national under-20 football team at the 2002 and 2004 editions of the FIFA U-20 Women's World Cup.

=== Senior ===
As a 17-year-old Santos player Diniz was part of the gold medal-winning Brazil team at the 2003 Pan American Games. At the 2003 FIFA Women's World Cup, she was named in a revamped Brazil squad and praised by coach Paulo Gonçalves: "Renata Diniz is a young player but she is very good and will help us a lot." She returned to the national team for the 2011 Pan American Games.
