= Giovânia =

Brazilian footballer (born 1985)

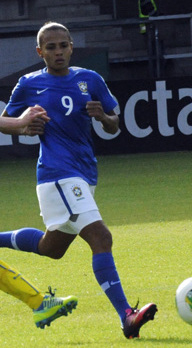

Personal information
- Full name: Giovânia Domingas Campos
- Date of birth: 31 October 1985 (age 41)
- Place of birth: São Bento, Maranhão, Brazil
- Height: 1.67 m (5 ft 6 in)
- Position: Forward

Team information
- Current team: Gaziantep Asya S.K.
- Number: 27

Senior career*
Years	Team	Apps	(Gls)
2001–2003	Corte Oito FC		
2004–2008	Saad		
2009	Francana		
2009	Botucatu		
2010	Hyundai Steel Red Angels		
2010–2011	Rio Preto		
2012–2014	São José	9+	(7+)
2015	Vegalta Sendai		
2016–2017	Vicsale Okinawa		
2018	Iranduba	9	(3)
2019	São Paulo	9	(2)
2023–	Gaziantep Asya S.K.	15	(10)

International career^{‡}
2012–2014	Brazil	2+	(1)
- * Club domestic league appearances and goals as of 10 January 2024 ‡ National team caps and goals as of 28 September 2014

Giovânia Domingas Campos (born 31 October 1985), simply known as Giovânia, is a Brazilian footballer who plays as a forward for Gaziantep Asya S.K. in the Turkish Women's Super League. She has been a member of the Brazil women's national team.

== International career ==
Giovânia played for Brazil at senior level in the 2014 Copa América Femenina.

=== International goals ===
Scores and results list Brazil's goal tally first

No.	Date	Venue	Opponent	Score	Result	Competition
1	9 December 2012	Pacaembu Stadium, São Paulo, Brazil	Portugal	4–0	4–0	2012 International Women's Football Tournament of City of São Paulo

== Honours ==
=== National team ===
- Copa América Femenina: 2014
