= Gislaine =

Brazilian football player (born 1988)

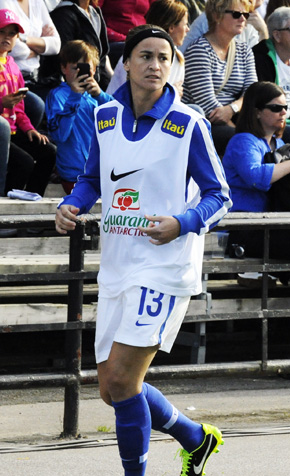
- Gislaine in 2013

Personal information
- Full name: Gislaine Cristina Souza da Silva
- Date of birth: 22 August 1988 (age 38)
- Place of birth: São José dos Campos, Brazil
- Height: 1.72 m (5 ft 8 in)
- Position: Defender

Team information
- Current team: Fluminense

Senior career*
Years	Team	Apps	(Gls)
2004–2017	São José	18+	(4+)
2018	Corinthians	10	(0)
2019	Santos	13	(3)
2020–2022	São Paulo	33	(5)
2023–	Fluminense	16	(2)

International career^{‡}
2013–	Brazil		
- * Club domestic league appearances and goals as of 22:57, 11 April 2024 (UTC) ‡ National team caps and goals as of 20:14, 31 December 2018 (UTC)

Gislaine Cristina Souza da Silva (born 22 August 1988), commonly known as Gislaine, is a Brazilian football defender who currently plays for Fluminense, and has played for the Brazil women's national team. A zagueira (transl. central defender), she joined Corinthians in 2018 after spending 13 years with São José. A year later, she moved on to Santos.

== Club career ==
=== São José ===
After playing futsal for three years at school, 16-year-old Gislaine attended a trial with São José Esporte Clube. Signed as a promising forward, she later developed into a defender.

=== Corinthians ===
After 13 years at São José, in which she won three Copa Libertadores Femenina titles and the 2014 International Women's Club Championship, Gislaine transferred to Corinthians in January 2018. She made her league debut against São Francisco BA on 25 April 2018.

=== Santos ===
One year later she joined Santos. Gislaine made her league debut against Foz Cataratas on 17 March 2019. She scored her first league goal against Avaí on 12 April 2019, scoring in the 77th minute.

=== São Paulo FC ===
In January 2020 she agreed a one-year contract with São Paulo FC. Gislaine made her league debut against Cruzeiro on 10 February 2020. She scored her first league goal against AS Minas ICESP on 30 August 2020, scoring in the 59th minute.

== International career ==
Gislaine was part of the Brazil under-20 selection at the 2008 FIFA U-20 Women's World Cup.

In December 2012, she was named in the senior Brazil women's national football team for the 2012 International Women's Football Tournament of City of São Paulo. But a broken hand meant that she had to withdraw from selection, to be replaced by Andréia Rosa. She won a first cap for Brazil in September 2013, in a 1–0 win over New Zealand at the 2013 Valais Women's Cup. She was called up to a national team training camp in January 2017.
