= Karen Peliçari =

Brazilian footballer (born 1989)

Karen
Personal information
- Full name: Karen Aline Peliçari
- Date of birth: 27 September 1989 (age 37)
- Place of birth: Americana, Brazil
- Height: 1.61 m (5 ft 3 in)
- Position: Forward

Team information
- Current team: Cruzeiro
- Number: 30

Senior career*
Years	Team	Apps	(Gls)
2008	AJA		
2009–2011	Santos		
2012	Centro Olímpico		
2013	Vitória das Tabocas		
2013	São Caetano		
2014	XV de Piracicaba		
2015–2018	Santos	17	(1)
2019	Audax	14	(1)
2020	Athletico Paranaense	6	(2)
2021	Santos	12	(3)
2022–	Cruzeiro	15	(1)

International career^{‡}
2008	Brazil U20		
2013	Brazil	1	(0)
- * Club domestic league appearances and goals as of 15:25, 11 January 2023 (UTC) ‡ National team caps and goals as of 19 June 2013

Karen Aline Peliçari (born 27 September 1989), simply known as Karen, is a Brazilian footballer who plays for Cruzeiro. Mainly a forward, she can also play as an attacking midfielder.

== Club career ==
Born in Americana, São Paulo, Karen joined Santos from AJA ahead of the 2009 season. In January 2012, after the club's women's football section was closed, she moved to Centro Olímpico.

Karen subsequently represented Vitória das Tabocas, São Caetano and XV de Piracicaba before returning to Santos in 2015, as the women's team was reestablished. She left in 2019 to join Audax, and also played for Athletico Paranaense in 2020 before rejoining Peixe for a third spell in January 2021.

On 17 December 2021, Karen left Santos after her contract was not renewed.

== International career ==
In 2008, Karen represented Brazil under-20s at the 2008 FIFA U-20 Women's World Cup. On 19 June 2013, she made her international debut with the full side, coming on as a late substitute for Giovânia in a 1–1 friendly draw against Sweden.

== Career statistics ==
=== International ===
As of 3 May 2021

Brazil
Year	Apps	Goals
2013	3	0
Total	3	0

== Honours ==
Santos

- Copa Libertadores Femenina: 2009, 2010
- Copa do Brasil de Futebol Feminino: 2009
- Campeonato Brasileiro de Futebol Feminino Série A1: 2017
- Campeonato Paulista de Futebol Feminino: 2018
