= Estádio Anísio Haddad =

Coordinates: 20°50′5″S 49°24′4″W

- Rio Pretão
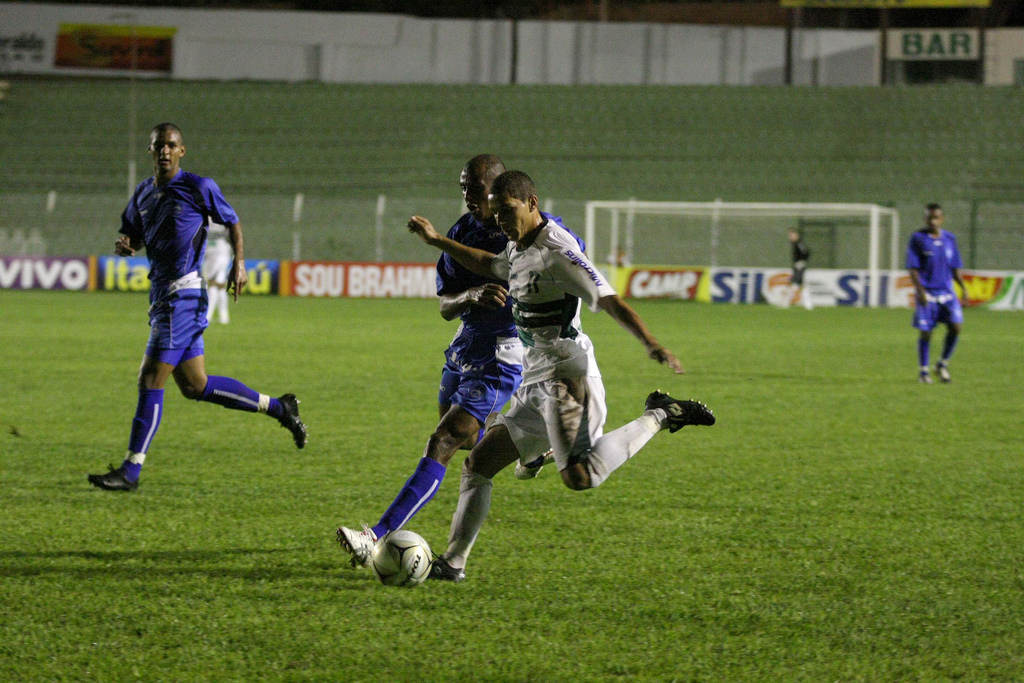
- Rio Preto x Rio Claro FC player by 2008 Campeonato Paulista, in the Estádio Anísio Haddad Sisbrace
- Interactive map of Estádio Anísio Haddad
- Full name: Estádio Anísio Haddad
- Location: Rua Joaquim Manoel Pires, 777, São José do Rio Preto, São Paulo state, Brazil
- Owner: Rio Preto Esporte Clube
- Capacity: 14,126
- Surface: Natural grass
- Field size: 105 by 68 metres (114.8 yd × 74.4 yd)

Construction
- Built: 1968
- Opened: April 21, 1968

Tenant
- Rio Preto Esporte Clube

The Estádio Anísio Haddad, usually known as Rio Pretão, is a multi-purpose stadium in São José do Rio Preto, Brazil. It is currently used mostly for football matches. The stadium has a capacity of 14,014 people. It was built in 1968.

Rio Pretão is owned by Rio Preto Esporte Clube. The stadium is named after Anísio Haddad, who was a president of Rio Preto Esporte Clube. The nickname Rio Pretão means Big Rio Preto.

== History ==
In 1968, the works on Rio Pretão were completed. The inaugural match was played on April 21 of that year, when Ponte Preta beat Rio Preto 4–1. The first goal of the stadium was scored by Ponte Preta's Dicá.

The stadium's attendance record currently stands at 17,845, set on July 12, 1971 when Catanduvense beat Rio Preto 1–0.
