= Grazielle =

Brazilian footballer (born 1981)

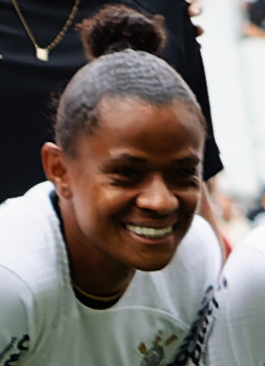

Personal information
- Full name: Grazielle Pinheiro Nascimento
- Date of birth: 28 March 1981 (age 45)
- Place of birth: Brasília, DF, Brazil
- Height: 1.63 m (5 ft 4 in)
- Position: Right winger

Team information
- Current team: Corinthians
- Number: 7

Youth career
- Gama

Senior career*
Years	Team	Apps	(Gls)
- Saad
- São Paulo FC
- Portuguesa
2003–2006	Botucatu		
2006	Levante		
2007–2008	Botucatu		
2010–2011	Santos		
2011	América-SP		
2012	Portuguesa		
2013	Tiradentes	4	(3)
2014	Portuguesa	2	(0)
2015	Centro Olímpico	12	(2)
2016–2023	Corinthians	65	(10)

International career
1998–2012	Brazil		
Medal record
Representing Brazil
Football
Olympic Games
Silver medal – second place	2004 Athens	Team competition
Pan American Games
Gold medal – first place	2007 Rio de Janeiro	Team competition
Silver medal – second place	2011 Guadalajara	Team competition
- * Club domestic league appearances and goals

Grazielle Pinheiro Nascimento (born 28 March 1981), commonly known as Grazielle or Grazi, is a Brazilian former professional footballer who played as a right winger. She was part of the Brazil women's national football team at two Olympic soccer tournaments and at three editions of the FIFA Women's World Cup.

== Club career ==
In 1995, Grazielle moved to São Paulo and over the following five years represented the women's sections of local clubs Saad Esporte Clube, São Paulo FC and Portuguesa. (Note: Portuguesa's female section were sometimes known as Lusa Sant'Anna due to an agreement with a local college of that name.) She was without a professional club from 2000 until 2003, when she joined Botucatu.

Grazielle returned to Botucatu after spending six months in Spain with Levante in 2006. She also played for Santa Isabel (MG), Barra FC (RJ) and SE Gama (DF) before joining Santos in 2010. She represented América FC of São Manuel before the 2012 London Olympics. The club wanted her to return after the tournament, but Grazielle agreed a contract with Portuguesa instead.

At the 2015 Copa do Brasil de Futebol Feminino, Grazielle played for Abelhas Rainhas, who were eliminated in the round of 16 by eventual winners Kindermann. She signed for Corinthians in 2016.

== International career ==
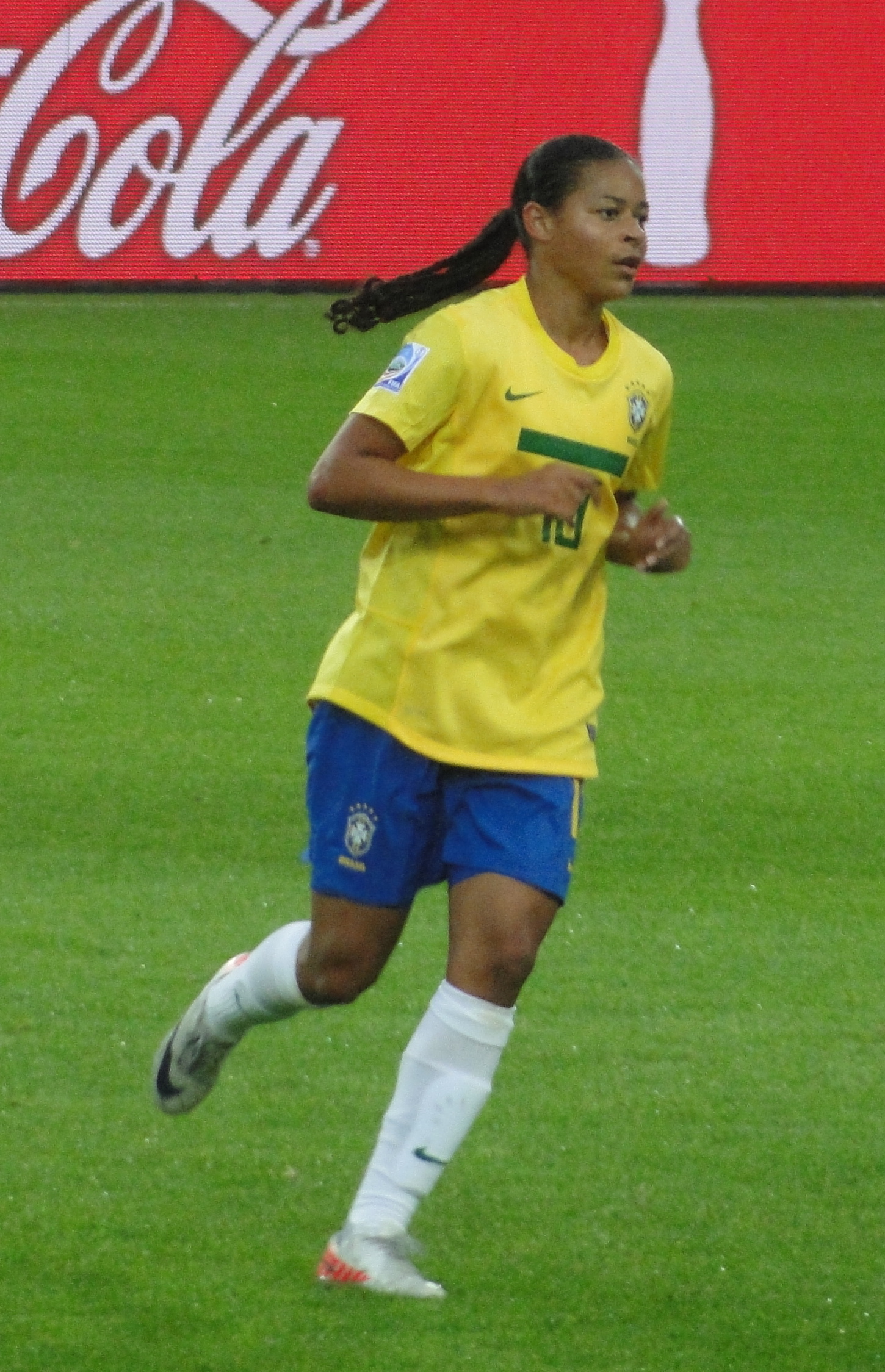
Grazielle in 2011

Grazielle made her debut for Brazil in an 11–0 win over Mexico at the 1998 Women's U.S. Cup. In February 1999, 17-year-old Grazielle stood in for the injured Roseli de Belo as Brazil's representative in a FIFA World Star team to play a showpiece friendly against the United States in San Jose. She was then part of the Brazilian roster which reached the 1999 FIFA Women's World Cup semi-finals.

After drifting out of contention, Grazielle was recalled ahead of the 2004 Athens Olympics. She successfully converted from a forward to an attacking right wing-back and helped Brazil win silver medals.
