= Fonte Luminosa =

Football (soccer) stadium in Araraquara, Brazil

Coordinates: 21.774446°S 48.170071°W

Estádio Fonte Luminosa
- Arena da Fonte Luminosa
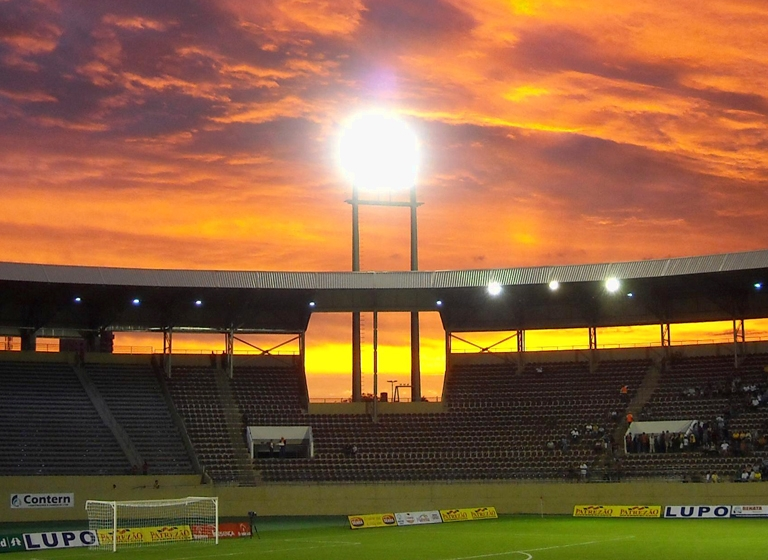
- Sisbrace
- Interactive map of Estádio Fonte Luminosa
- Full name: Estádio Doutor Adhemar de Barros
- Location: Araraquara, São Paulo
- Owner: Municipality of Araraquara
- Capacity: 20,000
- Surface: Natural grass
- Field size: 105 by 68 metres (114.8 yd × 74.4 yd)

Construction
- Built: 1951
- Opened: June 10, 1951
- Renovated: 1992, 2009
- Expanded: 1970, 2009

Tenant
- Ferroviária (1951–present)

Estádio Dr. Adhemar de Barros, usually known as Estádio Fonte Luminosa, or just Fonte Luminosa, is a football (soccer) stadium in Araraquara, Brazil. The stadium has a maximum capacity of 25,000. It was inaugurated in 1951. The stadium is owned by the Araraquara City Hall, and its formal name honors Adhemar Pereira de Barros, who was the governor of São Paulo state from 1938 to 1941, 1947 to 1951, and 1963 to 1966. Associação Ferroviária de Esportes usually plays their home matches at the stadium. Fonte Luminosa means Luminous Fountain.

== History ==
The inaugural match was played on June 10, 1951, when Vasco da Gama beat Ferroviária 5–0. The first goal of the stadium was scored by Vasco da Gama's Friaça.

The stadium's attendance record currently stands at 18,041 people, set on March 22, 1993 when Palmeiras beat Ferroviária 1–0.

On August 24, 1960, the stadium lighting was inaugurated. Ferroviária and Ponte Preta drew 3–3 in the lighting inaugural match.

Between 2008 and 2009, the stadium went under reforms, expanding its capacity from 18,000 seats to over 20,000. It was reopened on October 25, 2009 with a game between Palmeiras and Santo André for the Brasileirão. In 2010, Palmeiras played its last two home games of the 2010 Campeonato Brasileiro Série A in the Fonte Luminosa.

== See also ==
- List of football stadiums in Brazil
- Lists of stadiums
