= Associação Atlética Francana =

Francana
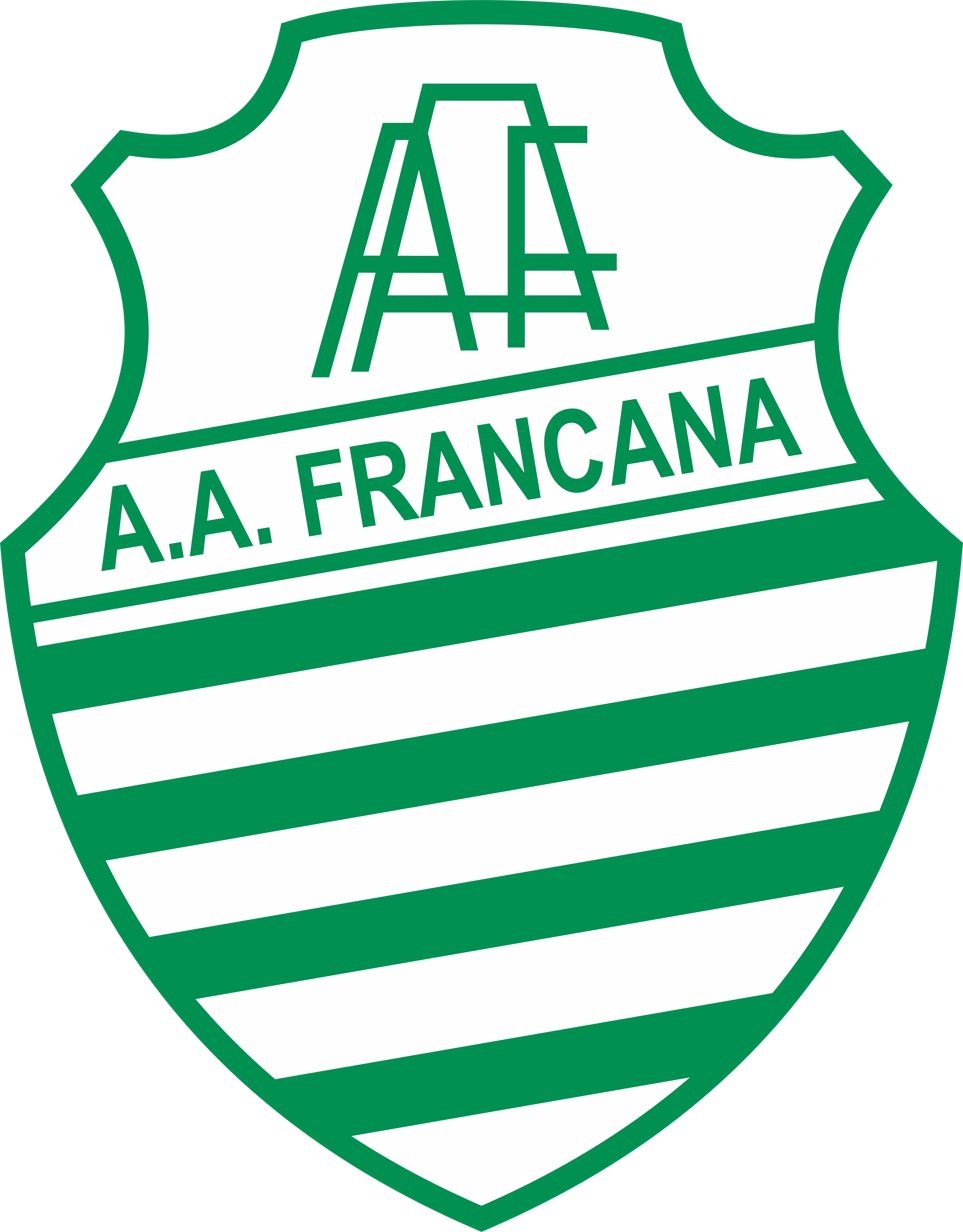
- Full name: Associação Atlética Francana
- Nicknames: Feiticeira; Veterana
- Founded: 12 October 1912; 113 years ago
- Ground: Lanchão
- Capacity: 15,100
- President: Fahim Youssef Neto
- Head Coach: Júlio Sérgio
- League: Campeonato Paulista Série A3
- 2025: Paulista Série A3, 12th of 16
| Home colours | Away colours |

Associação Atlética Francana, or simply Francana, is a Brazilian football team based in Franca, São Paulo. Founded in 1912, it plays in Campeonato Paulista Série A3.

The club competed in the Série A and in the Série C once.

== History ==
The club was founded on 12 October 1912. They won the Campeonato Paulista Série A2 in 1977. Francana competed in the Série A in 1979, but were eliminated in the Second Stage. The club reached the final stage of the 1997 Série C, finishing in the third place out of four in that stage.

== Honours ==
=== Official tournaments ===
State
| Competitions | Titles | Seasons |
|---|---|---|
| Campeonato Paulista Série A2 | 1 | 1977 |

=== Others tournaments ===
==== State ====
- Torneio Incentivo (1): 1980

=== Runners-up ===
- Campeonato Paulista Série A2 (3): 1968, 1969, 2002
- Campeonato Paulista Série A3 (1): 1996
- Campeonato Paulista Série A4 (1): 2024

== Stadium ==
Associação Atlética Francana play their home games at Estádio José Lancha Filho, nicknamed Lanchão. The stadium has a maximum capacity of 15,100 people.
