= Associação Ferroviária de Esportes (women) =

Brazilian professional women's association football club

Ferroviária
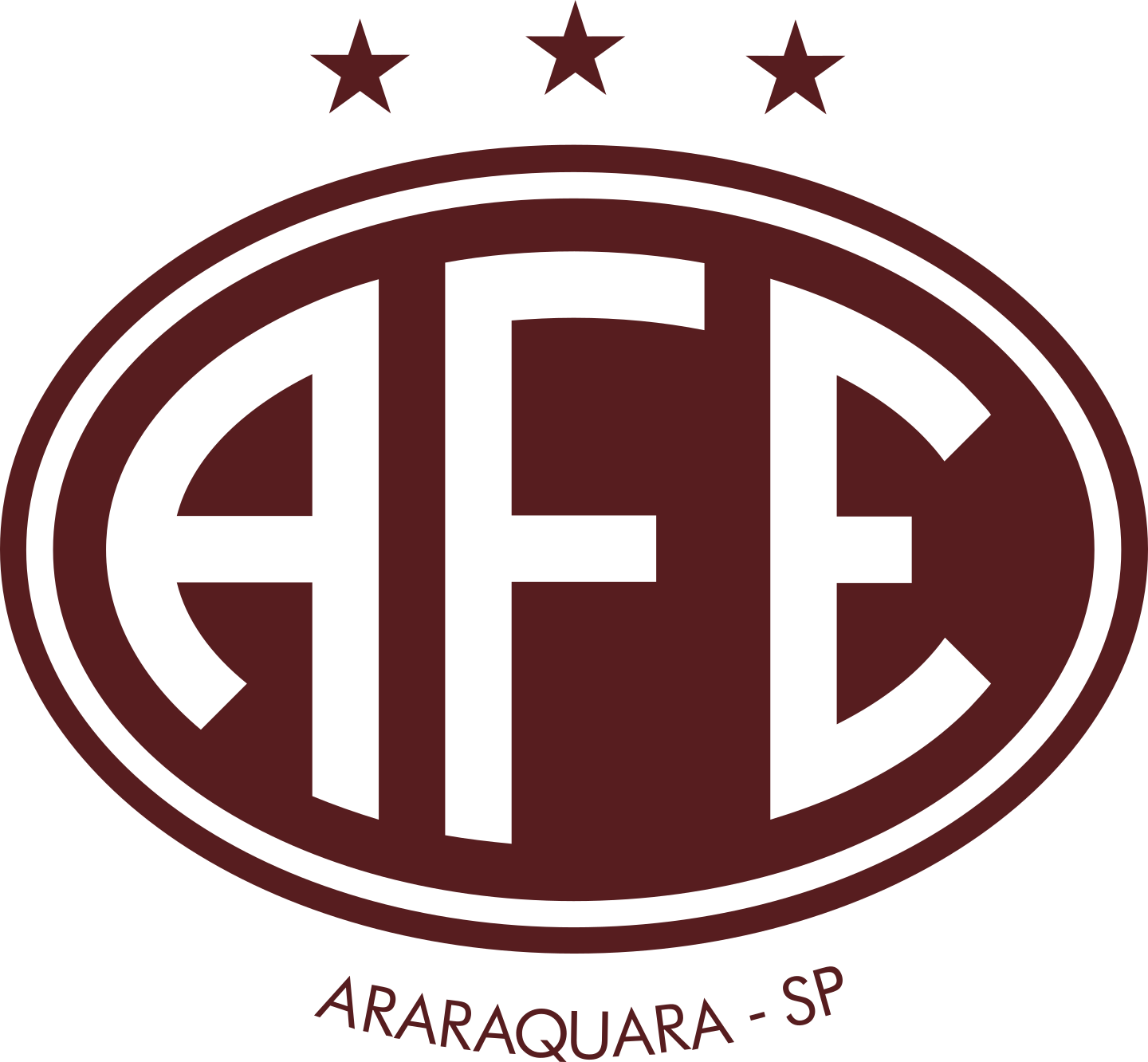
- Full name: Associação Ferroviária de Esportes Futebol Feminino
- Nicknames: Guerreiras Grenás (Maroon Warriors)
- Founded: 2001; 25 years ago
- Ground: Fonte Luminosa; Araraquara, São Paulo State, Brazil
- Capacity: 25,000
- Head coach: Leonardo Mendes
- League: Campeonato Brasileiro Série A1; Campeonato Paulista
- 2025 2025: Série A1, 6th of 16; Paulista, 3rd of 8
- Website: https://ferroviariasa.com/list/guerreiras-grenas/
Home colours	Away colours

Associação Ferroviária de Esportes Futebol Feminino, commonly known as Ferroviária or Ferroviária/Fundesport, is a professional women's association football club based in Araraquara, São Paulo state, Brazil. Founded in 2001, they have won the Campeonato Paulista on four occasions. In 2014 they secured a double of the Campeonato Brasileiro and the Copa do Brasil. The club is a three-way collaboration between the Ferroviária men's football club, the local authority's sports and leisure department and the charitable arm of the Caixa bank.

== Current squad ==
As of 12 April 2026.

Note: Flags indicate national team as defined under FIFA eligibility rules; some limited exceptions apply. Players may hold more than one non-FIFA nationality.

No.	Pos.	Nation	Player
1	GK	BRA	Luciana
2	DF	BRA	Kati
3	DF	BRA	Monique
4	DF	BRA	Luana
5	MF	BRA	Nicoly
7	FW	ANG	Patricia Seteco
8	MF	BRA	Maressa
9	FW	BRA	Natália Vendito
10	MF	BRA	Micaelly
11	FW	BRA	Mariana Santos
12	GK	BRA	Amanda Coimbra
13	DF	BRA	Grazy
14	MF	BRA	Ana Hansen
16	FW	BRA	Pâmela dos Santos
17	FW	BRA	Júlia Beatriz
20	DF	BRA	Camila

No.	Pos.	Nation	Player
21	FW	BRA	Dudinha
22	GK	BRA	Isa Faichel
23	FW	BRA	Thayslane
25	DF	BRA	Fátima Dutra
28	MF	BRA	Fernanda
30	DF	BRA	Sissi
33	DF	BRA	Kédima
34	DF	BRA	Sarah
60	MF	BRA	Brenda Pinheiro
74	DF	BRA	Andressa Pereira
88	FW	BRA	Naná
—	DF	BRA	Fogaça
—	FW	BRA	Pyetra
—	FW	BRA	Rhaissa
—	FW	BRA	Tainá

=== Former players ===
For details of current and former players, see Category:Associação Ferroviária de Esportes (women) players.

== Honours ==
=== Official tournaments ===
Continental
Competitions	Titles	Seasons
Copa Libertadores Femenina	2	2015, 2020
National
Competitions	Titles	Seasons
Campeonato Brasileiro Série A1	2	2014, 2019
Copa do Brasil	1	2014
State
Competitions	Titles	Seasons
Campeonato Paulista	3	2004, 2005, 2013
Copa Paulista	1	2023

=== Youth team ===
- Fiesta CONMEBOL Evolución Sub-16 (2): 2022, 2024
- Fiesta CONMEBOL Evolución Sub-14 (1): 2023
- CONMEBOL Magic Cup Sub-16 (1): 2022
- Liga de Desenvolvimento Sub-16 (2): 2021, 2024
- Liga de Desenvolvimento Sub-14 (1): 2023
- Campeonato Paulista Sub-20 (2): 2022, 2023
- Campeonato Paulista Sub-17 (1): 2024
- Campeonato Paulista Sub-15 (1): 2022
- Festival Paulista Sub-14 (2): 2019, 2022

== See also ==
- Associação Ferroviária de Esportes
