= Rio Preto Esporte Clube =

Rio Preto
- Full name: Rio Preto Esporte Clube
- Nickname(s): Verdão da Vila Universitária; Glorioso
- Founded: 21 April 1919; 105 years ago
- Ground: Riopretão
- Capacity: 14,126
- Head coach: Carlos Rossi
- League: Campeonato Paulista Série A3
- 2024: Paulista Série A3, 12th of 16
Home colours	Away colours

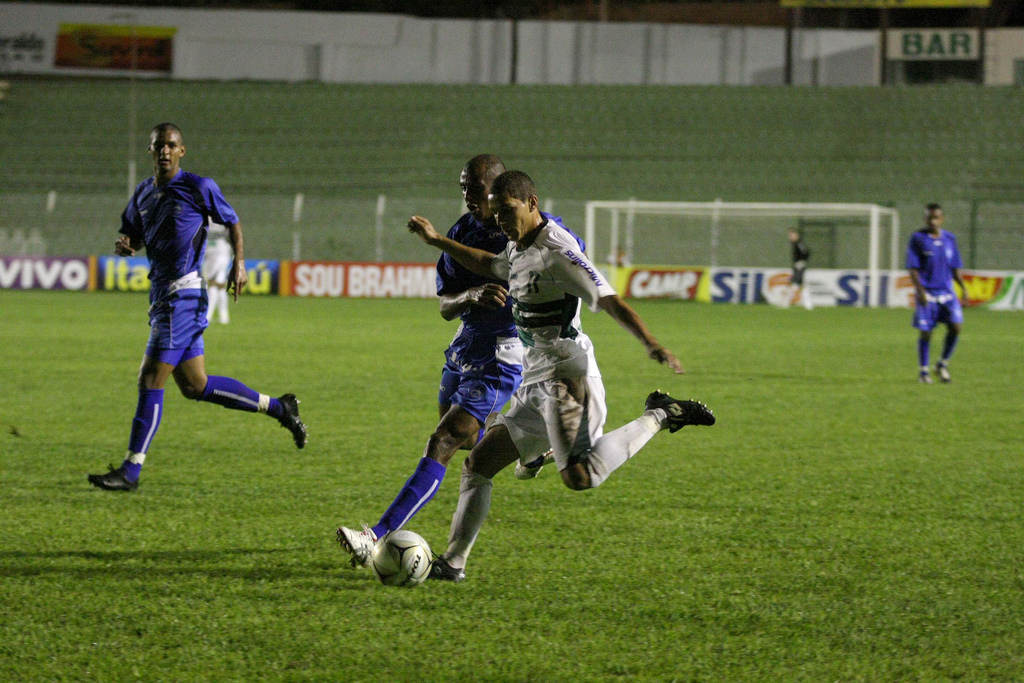
Rio Preto and Rio Claro in action in the 2008 Campeonato Paulista

Rio Preto Esporte Clube, commonly referred to as Rio Preto, is a Brazilian professional association football club based in São José do Rio Preto, São Paulo. The team competes in the Campeonato Paulista Série A3, the third tier of the São Paulo state football league.

The club's home colours are white and green and the team mascot is an alligator.

== History ==
On April 21, 1919, Rio Preto Esporte Clube was founded.

In 1999, the club won its first title, the Campeonato Paulista Third Level, beating Oeste in the final.

In 2007, Rio Preto for the first time ever was promoted to Campeonato Paulista Série A1.

== Honours ==
=== Official tournaments ===
State
Competitions	Titles	Seasons
Campeonato Paulista Série A3	2	1963, 1999

=== Runners-up ===
- Campeonato Paulista Série A2 (1): 2007
- Campeonato Paulista Série A3 (2): 1994, 2016

=== Women's Football ===
- Campeonato Brasileiro de Futebol Feminino Série A1 (1): 2015
- Campeonato Paulista de Futebol Feminino (2): 2016, 2017

== Stadium ==
Rio Preto Esporte Clube's home stadium is Anísio Haddad stadium, usually known as Rio Pretão, with a maximum capacity of 33,000 people.

== Mascot, nickname and club colors ==
The club's mascot is a yacare caiman, usually known as jacaré, which is the animal's Portuguese name.

Verdão da Vila Universitária, meaning College Ville Big Green, is the club's nickname.

Rio Preto's colors are green and white.
