= Brazil women's national football team results (2000–2009) =

- Win Draw Loss

This is a list of the Brazil women's national football team results from 2000 to 2009.

== Results ==
=== 2000 ===
23 June 2000 2000 CONCACAF Women's Gold Cup	Brazil	8–0	Costa Rica	Hershey, United States
	Roseli 5', 59'; Formiga 7', 35'; Kátia Cilene 52'; Monica 64'; Sissi 79'; Maycon 90+2'			Stadium: Hersheypark Stadium; Attendance: 10,483; Referee: Sonia Denoncourt (Canada)

25 June 2000 2000 CONCACAF Women's Gold Cup	Brazil	11–0	Trinidad and Tobago	Louisville, United States
	Kátia Cilene 8', 24', 45', 55', 66', 90'; Roseli 17', 18'; Daniela 30'; Cidinha 39' (pen.); Monica 60'			Stadium: Cardinal Stadium; Attendance: 7,043; Referee: Im Eun-ju (South Korea)

27 June 2000 2000 CONCACAF Women's Gold Cup	United States	0–0	Brazil	Foxborough, United States
				Stadium: Foxboro Stadium; Attendance: 16,386; Referee: Sonia Denoncourt (Canada)

1 July 2000 2000 CONCACAF Women's Gold Cup	China	2–3 (a.e.t.)	Brazil	Louisville, United States
	Shui 9'; Qiu 75'		Kátia Cilene 11'; Roseli 60'; Cidinha 107' (pen.)	Stadium: Cardinal Stadium; Attendance: 11,140; Referee: Ave Maria Alpizar (Costa Rica)

3 July 2000 2000 CONCACAF Women's Gold Cup	United States	1–0	Brazil	Foxborough, United States
	Milbrett 44'			Stadium: Foxboro Stadium; Attendance: 20,123; Referee: Virginia Tovar (Mexico)

1 September 2000 Friendly	United States	4–0	Brazil	San Jose, United States
	Foudy; Fawcett; Hamm (2 goals)			Stadium: Spartan Stadium; Referee: Kari Seitz (United States)

13 September 2000 2000 Olympics Group E	Sweden	0–2	Brazil	Melbourne, Australia
17:00		Report	Pretinha 21'; Kátia Cilene 70'	Stadium: Melbourne Cricket Ground; Attendance: 58,432; Referee: Sandra Hunt (United States)

16 September 2000 2000 Olympics Group E	Germany	2–1	Brazil	Canberra, Australia
17:30	Prinz 33', 41'	Report	Raquel 72'	Stadium: Bruce Stadium; Attendance: 17,000; Referee: Martha Toro (Colombia)

19 September 2000 2000 Olympics Group E	Australia	1–2	Brazil	Sydney, Australia
17:30	Hughes 33'	Report	Raquel 56'; Kátia Cilene 64'	Stadium: Sydney Football Stadium; Attendance: 29,400; Referee: Vibeke Karlsen (Norway)

24 September 2000 2000 Olympics Semifinals	United States	1–0	Brazil	Canberra, Australia
17:30	Hamm 60'	Report		Stadium: Bruce Stadium; Attendance: 11,000; Referee: Nicole Petignat (Switzerland)

28 September 2000 2000 Olympics Bronze medal match	Germany	2–0	Brazil	Sydney, Australia
17:00	Lingor 64'; Prinz 79'	Report		Stadium: Sydney Football Stadium; Attendance: 11,200; Referee: Im Eun Ju (South Korea)

=== 2001 ===
3 August 2001 Tiger Pools Toto Cup	China	0–0	Brazil	Ulsan, South Korea

5 August 2001 Tiger Pools Toto Cup	South Korea	3–1	Brazil	Gangneung, South Korea
	Lee Ji-eun 32'; Kang Seon Mi 42'; Gwak Mi Hui 90'		Nilda 58'

8 August 2001 Tiger Pools Toto Cup	Japan	1–1	Brazil	Suwon, South Korea
	?		Rosana

=== 2003 ===
23 April 2003 2003 South American Women's Football Championship	Brazil	3–2	Argentina	Lima, Peru
13:30	Kátia Cilene 1'; Pretinha 7'; Rosana 54'	Report	Gatti 49'; Almeida 71'	Stadium: Estadio Monumental "U"; Referee: Patricia da Silva (Uruguay)

25 April 2003 2003 South American Women's Football Championship	Peru	0–3	Brazil	Lima, Peru
15:30		Report	Formiga 26'; Pretinha 30'; Marta 53'	Stadium: Estadio Monumental "U"; Referee: María Teresa Alvarado (Bolivia)

27 April 2003 2003 South American Women's Football Championship	Brazil	12–0	Colombia	Lima, Peru
13:30	Pretinha 7', 15'; Formiga 22'; Marta 34', 50', 70' (pen.); Kátia Cilene 42', 44', 74', 82', 89'; Cristiane 80'	Report		Stadium: Estadio Monumental "U"; Referee: Marisela Contreras (Venezuela)

13 July 2003 Friendly	United States	1–0	Brazil	New Orleans, United States
	Milbrett			Stadium: Tad Gormley Stadium; Referee: Sonia Denoncourt (Canada)

17 July 2003 Friendly	Canada	2–1	Brazil	Montreal, Canada
	Wilkinson; Hermus		Tatiana	Stadium: Molson Stadium; Referee: Rachel Woo (United States)

20 July 2003 Friendly	Canada	2–1	Brazil	Ottawa, Canada
	Lang; Hermus		Cristiane	Stadium: Frank Clair Stadium; Referee: Sonia Denoncourt (Canada)

2 August 2003 2003 Pan American Games Group A	Haiti	0–5	Brazil	San Cristóbal, Dominican Republic
			Marta 6'; Kelly 18'; Formiga 55'; Renata Costa 70'; Maycon 78'	Stadium: Estadio Panamericano; Referee: Dianne James (Guyana)

8 August 2003 2003 Pan American Games Group A	Canada	0–5	Brazil	San Cristóbal, Dominican Republic
			Renata Costa 12'; Formiga 17'; Marta 28'; Maycon 68'; Elaine 72'	Stadium: Estadio Panamericano; Referee: Ave Maria Alpizar (Costa Rica)

11 August 2003 2003 Pan American Games Semifinals	Brazil	2–1	Argentina	Santo Domingo, Dominican Republic
	Marta 26', 62'		Almeida 80'	Stadium: Centro Olímpico; Referee: Dianne James (Guyana)

15 August 2003 2003 Pan American Games Gold medal match	Brazil	2–1	Canada	Santo Domingo, Dominican Republic
	Formiga 43'; Cristiane 91'		Kiss 66'	Stadium: Centro Olímpico; Attendance: 73; Referee: Kari Seitz (United States)

21 September 2003 2003 FIFA Women's World Cup Group B	Brazil	3–0	South Korea	Washington, D.C., United States
15:15 EDT (UTC−4)	Marta 14' (pen.); Kátia Cilene 55', 62'	Report		Stadium: RFK Stadium; Attendance: 34,144; Referee: Tammy Ogston (Australia)

24 September 2003 2003 FIFA Women's World Cup Group B	Norway	1–4	Brazil	Washington, D.C., United States
17:00 EDT (UTC−4)	Pettersen 45'	Report	Daniela 26'; Rosana 37'; Marta 59'; Kátia Cilene 68'	Stadium: RFK Stadium; Attendance: 16,316; Referee: Xonam Agboyi (Togo)

27 September 2003 2003 FIFA Women's World Cup Group B	France	1–1	Brazil	Washington, D.C., United States
12:45 EDT (UTC−4)	Pichon 90+2'	Report	Kátia Cilene 58'	Stadium: RFK Stadium; Attendance: 17,618; Referee: Cristina Ionescu (Romania)

1 October 2003 2003 FIFA Women's World Cup Quarterfinals	Brazil	1–2	Sweden	Foxborough, United States
16:30 EDT (UTC−4)	Marta 44' (pen.)	Report	Svensson 23'; Andersson 53'	Stadium: Gillette Stadium; Attendance: 25,103; Referee: Zhang Dongqing (China PR)

=== 2004 ===
24 April 2004 Friendly	United States	5–1	Brazil	Birmingham, United States
	Foudy 13'; Wambach 31', 42'; Welsh 86'; Hamm 87'	Report	Marta 55'	Stadium: Legion Field; Attendance: 11,527; Referee: Sandra Hunt (United States)

11 August 2004 2004 Olympics Group G	Brazil	1–0	Australia	Thessaloniki, Greece
18:00	Marta 36'	Report		Stadium: Kaftanzoglio Stadium; Attendance: 25,152; Referee: Dagmar Damková (Czech Republic)

14 August 2004 2004 Olympics Group G	United States	2–0	Brazil	Thessaloniki, Greece
20:30	Hamm 58' (pen.); Wambach 77'	Report		Stadium: Kaftanzoglio Stadium; Attendance: 17,123; Referee: Dagmar Damkova (Czech Republic)

17 August 2004 2004 Olympics Group G	Greece	0–7	Brazil	Patras, Greece
20:30		Report	Pretinha 21'; Cristiane 46', 55', 77'; Grazielle 49'; Marta 70'; Daniela 72'	Stadium: Pampeloponnisiako Stadium; Attendance: 7,214; Referee: Christine Frai (Germany)

20 August 2004 2004 Olympics Quarterfinals	Mexico	0–5	Brazil	Heraklio, Greece
21:00		Report	Cristiane 25', 49'; Formiga 29', 54'; Marta 60'	Stadium: Pankritio Stadium; Attendance: 3,012; Referee: Fatou Gaye (Senegal)

23 August 2004 2004 Olympics Semifinals	Brazil	1–0	Sweden	Patras, Greece
18:00	Pretinha 64'	Report		Stadium: Pampeloponnisiako Stadium; Attendance: 1,511; Referee: Dianne James (Guyana)

26 August 2004 2004 Olympics Gold medal match	United States	2–1 (a.e.t.)	Brazil	Piraeus, Greece
21:00	Tarpley 39'; Wambach 112'	Report	Pretinha 73'	Stadium: Karaiskakis Stadium; Attendance: 10,416; Referee: Jenny Palmqvist (Sweden), replaced by Dianne James (Guyana) after 90 minutes due to dehydration.

=== 2006 ===
28 October 2006 Peace Queen Cup	South Korea	0–1	Brazil	Seoul, South Korea
			Angélica 77'	Stadium: Seoul World Cup Stadium; Referee: Jenny Palmqvist (Sweden)

30 October 2006 Peace Queen Cup	Brazil	1–1	Italy	Masan, South Korea
	Suzana 54'		Perelli 21'	Stadium: Masan Complex Stadium; Referee: Tammy Ogston (Australia)

1 November 2006 Peace Queen Cup	Canada	4–2	Brazil	Changwon, South Korea
	Franko 1'; Hermus 6'; Sinclair 28'; Booth 33'		Roseli 14'; Nilda 85'	Stadium: Changwon Stadium; Referee: Tammy Ogston (Australia)

11 November 2006 2006 South American Women's Football Championship	Paraguay	1–4	Brazil	Mar del Plata, Argentina
15:00	Alarcón 69'	Report	Cristiane 19', 53'; Daniela 46'; Aline 59'	Stadium: Estadio José María Minella; Referee: Adriana Correa (Colombia)

13 November 2006 2006 South American Women's Football Championship	Peru	0–2	Brazil	Mar del Plata, Argentina
17:10		Report	Cristiane 6'; Elaine 80'	Stadium: Estadio José María Minella; Referee: Patricia da Silva (Uruguay)

17 November 2006 2006 South American Women's Football Championship	Brazil	6–1	Bolivia	Mar del Plata, Argentina
17:15	Daniela 7'; Cristiane 8', 22', 60'; Mônica 13'; Elaine 44'	Report	Morón 43' (pen.)	Stadium: Estadio José María Minella; Referee: Florencia Romano (Argentina)

19 November 2006 2006 South American Women's Football Championship	Brazil	6–0	Venezuela	Mar del Plata, Argentina
17:15	Daniela 1'; Renata Costa 12'; Michele 27', 45'; Cristiane 56'; Daniele 81'	Report		Stadium: Estadio José María Minella; Referee: Estela Álvarez (Argentina)

22 November 2006 2006 South American Women's Football Championship	Brazil	6–0	Uruguay	Mar del Plata, Argentina
17:15	Daniela 11', 23' (pen.); Grazielle 47', 86'; Elaine 64'; Cristiane 72' (pen.)	Report		Stadium: Estadio José María Minella; Referee: Adriana Correa (Colombia)

24 November 2006 2006 South American Women's Football Championship	Brazil	6–0	Paraguay	Mar del Plata, Argentina
17:15	Cristiane 6', 27' (pen.), 62', 64'; Daniela 36'; Renata Costa 68'	Report		Stadium: Estadio José María Minella; Referee: Marilyn Ángulo (Venezuela)

26 November 2006 2006 South American Women's Football Championship	Argentina	2–0	Brazil	Mar del Plata, Argentina
17:15	González 66'; Potassa 68'	Report		Stadium: Estadio José María Minella; Referee: Patricia da Silva (Uruguay)

=== 2007 ===
24 June 2007 Friendly	United States	2–0	Brazil	East Rutherford, United States
	Lilly 1'; Wambach 57'	Report		Stadium: Giants Stadium; Attendance: 16,586; Referee: Rachel Woo (United States)

12 July 2007 2007 Pan American Games Group A	Brazil	4–0	Uruguay	Rio de Janeiro, Brazil
14:00	Daniela 2', 69'; Cristiane 15'; Rosana 35'			Stadium: Estádio Engenhão; Referee: Ricardo Cerdas (Costa Rica)

14 July 2007 2007 Pan American Games Group A	Brazil	5–0	Jamaica	Rio de Janeiro, Brazil
15:30	Kátia Cilene 9', 52'; Daniela 23'; Marta 65' (pen.); Cristiane 85' (pen.)			Stadium: Estádio Engenhão; Referee: Atilio Invernizzi (Paraguay)

18 July 2007 2007 Pan American Games Group A	Brazil	10–0	Ecuador	Rio de Janeiro, Brazil
11:00	Cristiane 10', 27', 30', 47'; Daniela 18'; Marta 35', 56', 74', 90'; Pretinha 66'			Stadium: Estádio Engenhão; Referee: Pablo Lunati (Argentina)

20 July 2007 2007 Pan American Games Group A	Brazil	7–0	Canada	Rio de Janeiro, Brazil
15:00	Marta 25', 52', 72', 85', 88'; Rosana 50'; Daniela 66'			Stadium: Estádio do Maracanã; Referee: Pablo Pozo (Chile)

23 July 2007 2007 Pan American Games Semifinals	Brazil	2–0	Mexico	Rio de Janeiro, Brazil
15:00	Rosana 60', 66'			Stadium: Estádio do Maracanã; Referee: Atilio Invernizzi (Paraguay)

26 July 2007 2007 Pan American Games Gold medal match	Brazil	5–0	United States	Rio de Janeiro, Brazil
12:00	Marta 18' (pen.), 56' (pen.); Cristiane 29', 47'; Daniela 75'	Report		Stadium: Estádio do Maracanã; Referee: Fernando Cabrera (Uruguay)

2 September 2007 Friendly	Japan	2–1	Brazil	Chiba, Japan
	Iwashimizu; Tânia Maranhão (o.g.)		Cristiane	Stadium: Fukuda Denshi Arena; Referee: Krystyna Szokolai (Australia)

12 September 2007 2007 FIFA Women's World Cup Group D	New Zealand	0–5	Brazil	Wuhan, China
17:00		Report	Daniela 10'; Cristiane 54'; Marta 74', 90+3'; Renata Costa 86'	Stadium: Wuhan Sports Centre Stadium; Attendance: 50,800; Referee: Pannipar Kamnueng (Thailand)

15 September 2007 2007 FIFA Women's World Cup Group D	Brazil	2–0	China	Wuhan, China
20:00	Marta 42', 70'; Cristiane 47', 48'	Report		Stadium: Wuhan Sports Centre Stadium; Attendance: 54,000; Referee: Jennifer Bennett (United States)

20 September 2007 2007 FIFA Women's World Cup Group D	Brazil	1–0	Denmark	Hangzhou, China
20:00	Pretinha 90+1'	Report		Stadium: Yellow Dragon Stadium; Attendance: 42,817; Referee: Kari Seitz (United States)

23 September 2007 2007 FIFA Women's World Cup Quarterfinals	Brazil	3–2	Australia	Tianjin, China
20:00	Formiga 4'; Marta 23' (pen.); Cristiane 75'	Report	De Vanna 36'; Colthorpe 68'	Stadium: Tianjin Olympic Center Stadium; Attendance: 35,061; Referee: Christine Beck (Germany)

27 September 2007 2007 FIFA Women's World Cup Semifinals	United States	0–4	Brazil	Hangzhou, China
20:00		Report	Osborne 20' (o.g.); Marta 27', 79'; Cristiane 56'	Stadium: Yellow Dragon Stadium; Attendance: 47,818; Referee: Nicole Petignat (Switzerland)

30 September 2007 2007 FIFA Women's World Cup Final	Germany	2–0	Brazil	Shanghai, China
20:00	Prinz 52'; Laudehr 86'	Report		Stadium: Hongkou Football Stadium; Attendance: 31,000; Referee: Tammy Ogston (Australia)

=== 2008 ===
19 April 2008 2008 Olympics qualification CONMEBOL–CAF play-off	Brazil	5–1	Ghana	Beijing, China
19:45 UTC+8	Marta 19'; Cristiane 42', 71'; Aline 53'; Rosana 72'	Report	Amankwa 76'	Stadium: Workers' Stadium; Attendance: 21,185; Referee: Niu Huijun (China PR)

15 June 2008 Peace Queen Cup	Brazil	2–1	Italy	Suwon, South Korea
	Érika 6'; Maurine 77'		Zorri 45' (pen.)	Stadium: Suwon Civil Stadium; Referee: Alexandra Ihringova (England)

17 June 2008 Peace Queen Cup	United States	1–0	Brazil	Suwon, South Korea
	Rodriguez 41'			Stadium: Suwon Civil Stadium; Referee: Jenny Palmqvist (Sweden)

19 June 2008 Peace Queen Cup	Australia	1–0	Brazil	Suwon, South Korea
	Simon 90+2'			Stadium: Suwon Civil Stadium; Referee: Sandra Serafini (United States)

10 July 2008 Friendly	Canada	1–1	Brazil	Toronto, Canada
	Sinclair 53'		Raquel 12'	Stadium: BMO Field; Referee: Michelle Pye (Canada)

13 July 2008 Friendly	United States	1–0	Brazil	Commerce City, United States
	Rodriguez 71'	Report		Stadium: Dick's Sporting Goods Park; Attendance: 15,071; Referee: Dallas Malhiwsky (United States)

16 July 2008 Friendly	United States	1–0	Brazil	San Diego, United States
	Kai 85'	Report		Stadium: Torero Stadium; Attendance: 7,502; Referee: Jen Bennett (United States)

6 August 2008 2008 Olympics Group F	Germany	0–0	Brazil	Shenyang, China
17:00		Report		Stadium: Shenyang Olympic Stadium; Attendance: 20,703; Referee: Kari Seitz (USA)

9 August 2008 2008 Olympics Group F	Brazil	2–1	North Korea	Shenyang, China
19:45	Daniela 14'; Marta 23'	Report	Ri Kum-suk 90'	Stadium: Shenyang Olympic Stadium; Attendance: 19,616; Referee: Niu Huijun (China)

12 August 2008 2008 Olympics Group F	Nigeria	1–3	Brazil	Beijing, China
17:00	Nkwocha 19' (pen.)	Report	Cristiane 34', 35', 45+3'	Stadium: Workers' Stadium; Attendance: 51,112; Referee: Hong Eun-ah (Korea Republic)

15 August 2008 2008 Olympics Quarterfinals	Brazil	2–1	Norway	Tianjin, China
18:00	Daniela 43'; Marta 57'	Report	Nordby 83' (pen.)	Stadium: Tianjin Olympic Center Stadium; Attendance: 26,174; Referee: Kari Seitz (USA)

18 August 2008 2008 Olympics Semifinals	Brazil	4–1	Germany	Shanghai, China
18:00	Formiga 43'; Cristiane 49', 76'; Marta 53'	Report	Prinz 10'	Stadium: Shanghai Stadium; Attendance: 26,976; Referee: Hong Eun-ah (Korea Republic)

21 August 2008 2008 Olympics Gold medal match	Brazil	0–1 (a.e.t.)	United States	Beijing, China
21:00		Report	Lloyd 96'	Stadium: Workers' Stadium; Attendance: 51,612; Referee: Dagmar Damkova (Czech Republic)

=== 2009 ===
22 April 2009 Friendly	Germany	1–1	Brazil	Frankfurt, Germany
	Mittag 24'	Report	Maurine 36'	Stadium: Frankfurter Commerzbank-Arena; Referee: Jenny Palmqvist (Sweden)

25 April 2009 Friendly	Sweden	3–1	Brazil	Gothenburg, Sweden
	Thunebro 25'; Svensson 26'; Schelin 89'	Report	Cristiane 13'	Stadium: Gamla Ullevi; Referee: Kirsi Savolainen (Finland)

9 December 2009 2009 Torneio Internacional de Futebol Feminino	Brazil	3–1	Chile	São Paulo, Brazil
18:00	Cristiane 32', 76'; Marta 37'	Report	Moreno 65'	Stadium: Estádio do Pacaembu; Attendance: 2,317; Referee: Luis Flávio de Oliveira (Brazil)

13 December 2009 2009 Torneio Internacional de Futebol Feminino	Brazil	3–2	Mexico	São Paulo, Brazil
18:00	Marta 3'; Érika 6'; Cristiane 68'	Report	Ocampo 29'; Garza 72'	Stadium: Estádio do Pacaembu; Attendance: 5,832; Referee: Robério Pereira Pires (Brazil)

16 December 2009 2009 Torneio Internacional de Futebol Feminino	Brazil	3–0	China	São Paulo, Brazil
21:50	Marta 42', 88'; Grazielle 75'	Report		Stadium: Estádio do Pacaembu; Attendance: 3,205; Referee: Philippe Lombard (Brazil)

20 December 2009 2009 Torneio Internacional de Futebol Feminino	Brazil	5–2	Mexico	São Paulo, Brazil
16:00	Aline 22'; Marta 34', 59', 73'; Érika 54'	Report	Garza 11'; Rangel 70'	Stadium: Estádio do Pacaembu; Attendance: 21,343; Referee: Sálvio Spinola (Brazil)
