= 2006 in Brazilian football =

Football in Brazil
- Season: 2006

The following article presents a summary of the 2006 football (soccer) season in Brazil, which was the 105th season of competitive football in the country.

== Campeonato Brasileiro Série A ==
| Pos | Team | Pld | W | D | L | GF | GA | GD | Pts | Qualification or relegation |
|---|---|---|---|---|---|---|---|---|---|---|
| 1 | São Paulo | 38 | 22 | 12 | 4 | 66 | 32 | +34 | 78 | Qualified for the 2007 Copa Libertadores and 2007 Copa Sudamericana |
| 2 | Internacional | 38 | 20 | 9 | 9 | 52 | 36 | +16 | 69 | Qualified for the 2007 Copa Libertadores |
| 3 | Grêmio | 38 | 20 | 7 | 11 | 64 | 45 | +19 | 67 | Qualified for the 2007 Copa Libertadores |
| 4 | Santos | 38 | 18 | 10 | 10 | 57 | 36 | +21 | 64 | Qualified for the 2007 Copa Libertadores |
| 5 | Paraná | 38 | 18 | 6 | 14 | 56 | 49 | +7 | 60 | Qualified for the 2007 Copa Libertadores |
| 6 | Vasco | 38 | 15 | 14 | 9 | 57 | 50 | +7 | 59 | Qualified for the 2007 Copa Sudamericana |
| 7 | Figueirense | 38 | 15 | 12 | 11 | 57 | 44 | +13 | 57 | Qualified for the 2007 Copa Sudamericana |
| 8 | Goiás | 38 | 15 | 10 | 13 | 63 | 49 | +14 | 55 | Qualified for the 2007 Copa Sudamericana |
| 9 | Corinthians | 38 | 15 | 8 | 15 | 41 | 46 | −5 | 53 | Qualified for the 2007 Copa Sudamericana |
| 10 | Cruzeiro | 38 | 14 | 11 | 13 | 52 | 45 | +7 | 53 | Qualified for the 2007 Copa Sudamericana |
| 11 | Flamengo | 38 | 15 | 7 | 16 | 44 | 48 | −4 | 52 | Qualified for the 2007 Copa Libertadores by winning the 2006 Copa do Brasil |
| 12 | Botafogo | 38 | 13 | 12 | 13 | 52 | 50 | +2 | 51 | Qualified for the 2007 Copa Sudamericana |
| 13 | Atlético-PR | 38 | 13 | 9 | 16 | 61 | 62 | −1 | 48 | Qualified for the 2007 Copa Sudamericana |
| 14 | Juventude | 38 | 13 | 8 | 17 | 44 | 54 | −10 | 47 | |
| 15 | Fluminense | 38 | 11 | 12 | 15 | 48 | 58 | −10 | 45 | |
| 16 | Palmeiras | 38 | 12 | 8 | 18 | 58 | 70 | −12 | 44 | |
| 17 | Ponte Preta | 38 | 10 | 9 | 19 | 45 | 65 | −20 | 39 | Relegated to Série B 2007 |
| 18 | Fortaleza | 38 | 8 | 14 | 16 | 39 | 62 | −23 | 38 | Relegated to Série B 2007 |
| 19 | São Caetano | 38 | 9 | 9 | 20 | 37 | 53 | −16 | 36 | Relegated to Série B 2007 |
| 20 | Santa Cruz | 38 | 7 | 7 | 24 | 41 | 75 | −34 | 28 | Relegated to Série B 2007 |

São Paulo declared as the Campeonato Brasileiro champions.

=== Relegation ===
The four worst placed teams, which are Ponte Preta, Fortaleza, São Caetano and Santa Cruz, were relegated to the following year's second level.

== Campeonato Brasileiro Série B ==
| Pos | Team | Pld | W | D | L | GF | GA | GD | Pts | Promotion or relegation |
|---|---|---|---|---|---|---|---|---|---|---|
| 1 | Atlético Mineiro | 38 | 20 | 11 | 7 | 70 | 39 | +31 | 71 | Promoted to the 2007 Campeonato Brasileiro Série A |
| 2 | Sport Recife | 38 | 18 | 10 | 10 | 57 | 36 | +21 | 64 | Promoted to the 2007 Campeonato Brasileiro Série A |
| 3 | Náutico | 38 | 18 | 10 | 10 | 64 | 48 | +16 | 64 | Promoted to the 2007 Campeonato Brasileiro Série A |
| 4 | América de Natal | 38 | 19 | 4 | 15 | 59 | 51 | +8 | 61 | Promoted to the 2007 Campeonato Brasileiro Série A |
| 5 | Paulista | 38 | 17 | 10 | 11 | 72 | 51 | +21 | 61 | |
| 6 | Coritiba | 38 | 16 | 11 | 11 | 64 | 51 | +13 | 59 | |
| 7 | Santo André | 38 | 14 | 14 | 10 | 47 | 45 | +2 | 56 | |
| 8 | Brasiliense | 38 | 15 | 8 | 15 | 66 | 51 | +15 | 53 | |
| 9 | Marília | 38 | 13 | 11 | 14 | 58 | 58 | 0 | 50 | |
| 10 | Ituano | 38 | 12 | 14 | 12 | 49 | 48 | +1 | 50 | |
| 11 | Gama | 38 | 14 | 6 | 18 | 52 | 62 | −10 | 48 | |
| 12 | Remo | 38 | 13 | 7 | 18 | 50 | 60 | −10 | 46 | |
| 13 | Avaí | 38 | 12 | 10 | 16 | 36 | 51 | −15 | 46 | |
| 14 | Portuguesa | 38 | 11 | 12 | 15 | 47 | 58 | −11 | 45 | |
| 15 | Ceará | 38 | 10 | 15 | 13 | 47 | 56 | −9 | 45 | |
| 16 | CRB | 38 | 12 | 8 | 18 | 61 | 67 | −6 | 44 | |
| 17 | Paysandu | 38 | 12 | 8 | 18 | 51 | 70 | −19 | 44 | Relegated to the 2007 Campeonato Brasileiro Série C |
| 18 | Guarani | 38 | 11 | 14 | 13 | 53 | 61 | −8 | 44 (Note: Guarani was punished by FIFA with the loss of 3 points) | Relegated to the 2007 Campeonato Brasileiro Série C |
| 19 | São Raimundo-AM | 38 | 11 | 10 | 17 | 42 | 59 | −17 | 43 | Relegated to the 2007 Campeonato Brasileiro Série C |
| 20 | Vila Nova | 38 | 11 | 9 | 18 | 45 | 68 | −23 | 42 | Relegated to the 2007 Campeonato Brasileiro Série C |

Notes:

Atlético Mineiro declared as the Campeonato Brasileiro Série B champions.

=== Promotion ===
The four best placed teams, which are Atlético Mineiro, Sport, Náutico and América-RN, were promoted to the following year's first level.

=== Relegation ===
The four worst placed teams, which are Paysandu, Guarani, São Raimundo and Vila Nova, were relegated to the following year's third level.

== Campeonato Brasileiro Série C ==
Final stage
| Pos | Team | Pld | W | D | L | GF | GA | GD | Pts | Promotion |
|---|---|---|---|---|---|---|---|---|---|---|
| 1 | (Santa Catarina (state)) Criciúma/SC | 14 | 9 | 4 | 1 | 27 | 11 | +16 | 31 | Promoted to the Série B in 2007 |
| 2 | (Bahia) Vitória/BA | 14 | 8 | 1 | 5 | 23 | 18 | +5 | 25 | Promoted to the Série B in 2007 |
| 3 | (Minas Gerais) Ipatinga/MG | 14 | 7 | 3 | 4 | 21 | 15 | +6 | 24 | Promoted to the Série B in 2007 |
| 4 | (São Paulo (state)) Grêmio Barueri/SP | 14 | 7 | 2 | 5 | 27 | 22 | +5 | 23 | Promoted to the Série B in 2007 |
| 5 | (Ceará) Ferroviário/CE | 14 | 6 | 1 | 7 | 21 | 26 | −5 | 19 | |
| 6 | Bahia/BA | 14 | 4 | 2 | 8 | 21 | 30 | −9 | 14 | |
| 7 | (Rio Grande do Sul) Brasil/RS | 14 | 4 | 1 | 9 | 16 | 25 | −9 | 13 | |
| 8 | (Paraíba) Treze/PB | 14 | 3 | 2 | 9 | 17 | 26 | −9 | 11 | |

Criciúma declared as the Campeonato Brasileiro Série C champions.

=== Promotion ===
The four best placed teams in the final stage of the competition, which are Criciúma, Vitória, Ipatinga and Grêmio Barueri, were promoted to the following year's second level.

== Copa do Brasil ==
The Copa do Brasil final was played between Flamengo and Vasco.

July 19, 2006

| Flamengo | 2–0 | Vasco |

Maracanã

July 26, 2006

| Vasco | 0–1 | Flamengo |

Maracanã

Flamengo declared as the cup champions by aggregate score of 3–0.

== State championship champions ==
| State | Champion | State | Champion |
|---|---|---|---|
| Acre | ADESG | Paraíba | Treze |
| Alagoas | Coruripe | Paraná | Paraná |
| Amapá | São José | Pernambuco | Sport Recife |
| Amazonas | São Raimundo | Piauí | Parnahyba |
| Bahia | Colo-Colo | Rio de Janeiro | Botafogo |
| Ceará | Ceará | Rio Grande do Norte | Baraúnas |
| Distrito Federal | Brasiliense | Rio Grande do Sul | Grêmio |
| Espírito Santo | Vitória-ES | Rondônia | Ulbra Ji-Paraná |
| Goiás | Goiás | Roraima | Baré |
| Maranhão | Moto Club | Santa Catarina | Figueirense |
| Mato Grosso | Operário (VG) | São Paulo | Santos |
| Mato Grosso do Sul | Coxim | Sergipe | Pirambu |
| Minas Gerais | Cruzeiro | Tocantins | Araguaína |
| Pará | Paysandu | | |

== Youth competition champions ==
| Competition | Champion |
|---|---|
| Campeonato Brasileiro Sub-20 | Internacional |
| Copa Macaé de Juvenis | Flamengo |
| Copa Santiago de Futebol Juvenil | Atlético Mineiro |
| Copa São Paulo de Juniores | América-SP |
| Copa Sub-17 de Promissão | Cruzeiro |
| Taça Belo Horizonte de Juniores | Atlético Paranaense |

== Other competition champions ==
| Competition | Champion |
|---|---|
| Copa Espírito Santo | Vilavelhense |
| Copa FGF | Grêmio B |
| Copa FPF | Ferroviária |
| Copa Governador do Mato Grosso | Cacerense |
| Copa Integração | Guarani de Juazeiro |
| Copa Paraná | Roma |
| Copa Santa Catarina | Chapecoense |
| Taça Minas Gerais | Villa Nova |

== Brazilian clubs in international competitions ==
| Team | Copa Libertadores 2006 | Copa Sudamericana 2006 | Recopa Sudamericana 2006 | FIFA Club World Cup 2006 |
|---|---|---|---|---|
| Atlético Paranaense | did not qualify | Semifinals eliminated by (Mexico) Pachuca | did not qualify | N/A |
| Botafogo | did not qualify | Preliminary round eliminated by (Brazil) Fluminense | N/A | N/A |
| Corinthians | Round of 16 eliminated by (Argentina) River Plate | Round of 16 eliminated by (Argentina) Lanús | N/A | did not qualify |
| Cruzeiro | did not qualify | Preliminary round eliminated by (Brazil) Santos | N/A | N/A |
| Fluminense | did not qualify | Round of 16 eliminated by (Argentina) Gimnasia La Plata | N/A | N/A |
| Goiás | Round of 16 eliminated by (Argentina) Estudiantes | did not qualify | N/A | did not qualify |
| Internacional | Champions defeated (Brazil) São Paulo | did not qualify | N/A | Champions defeated (Spain) Barcelona |
| Palmeiras | Round of eliminated by (Brazil) São Paulo | did not qualify | did not qualify | did not qualify |
| Paraná | did not qualify | Preliminary round eliminated by (Brazil) Atlético Paranaense | N/A | N/A |
| Paulista | Group stage finished 4th place | did not qualify | N/A | did not qualify |
| Santos | did not qualify | Round of 16 eliminated by (Argentina) San Lorenzo | did not qualify | N/A |
| São Paulo | Runner-up lost to (Brazil) Internacional | did not qualify | Runner-up lost to (Argentina) Boca Juniors | did not qualify |
| Vasco | did not qualify | Preliminary round eliminated by (Brazil) Corinthians | N/A | N/A |

== Brazil national team ==
The following table lists all the games played by the Brazil national football team in official competitions and friendly matches during 2006.

| Date | Opposition | Result | Score | Brazil scorers | Competition |
|---|---|---|---|---|---|
| March 1, 2006 | Russia | W | 1–0 | Ronaldo | International Friendly |
| May 30, 2006 | (Canton of Lucerne) Lucerne XI | W | 8–0 | Kaká, Adriano (2), Ronaldo (2), Lúcio, Juninho, Robinho | International Friendly (unofficial match) |
| June 4, 2006 | New Zealand | W | 4–0 | Ronaldo, Adriano, Kaká, Juninho | International Friendly |
| June 13, 2006 | Croatia | W | 1–0 | Kaká | World Cup |
| June 18, 2006 | Australia | W | 2–0 | Adriano, Fred | World Cup |
| June 22, 2006 | Japan | W | 4–1 | Ronaldo (2), Juninho, Gilberto | World Cup |
| June 27, 2006 | Ghana | W | 3–0 | Ronaldo, Adriano, Zé Roberto | World Cup |
| July 1, 2006 | France | L | 0–1 | - | World Cup |
| August 16, 2006 | Norway | D | 1–1 | Carvalho | International Friendly |
| September 3, 2006 | Argentina | W | 3–0 | Elano (2), Kaká | International Friendly |
| September 5, 2006 | Wales | W | 2–0 | Marcelo, Vágner Love | International Friendly |
| October 7, 2006 | Al Kuwait | W | 4–0 | Sóbis, Robinho, Carvalho, Kaká | International Friendly (unofficial match) |
| October 10, 2006 | Ecuador | W | 2–1 | Fred, Kaká | International Friendly |
| November 15, 2006 | Switzerland | W | 2–1 | Luisão, Kaká | International Friendly |

== Women's football ==
=== Brazil women's national football team ===
The following table lists all the games played by the Brazil women's national football team in official competitions and friendly matches during 2006.

| Date | Opposition | Result | Score | Brazil scorers | Competition |
|---|---|---|---|---|---|
| October 28, 2006 | South Korea | W | 1–0 | Angélica | Peace Queen Cup |
| October 30, 2006 | Italy | D | 1–1 | Su | Peace Queen Cup |
| November 1, 2006 | Canada | L | 2–4 | Roseli, Nildinha | Peace Queen Cup |
| November 11, 2006 | Paraguay | W | 4–1 | Cristiane Silva (2), Daniela Alves, Aline Pellegrino | Sudamericano Femenino |
| November 13, 2006 | Peru | W | 2–0 | Cristiane Silva, Elaine | Sudamericano Femenino |
| November 17, 2006 | Bolivia | W | 6–1 | Daniela Alves, Cristiane Silva (3), Mônica de Paula, Elaine | Sudamericano Femenino |
| November 19, 2006 | Venezuela | W | 6–0 | Daniela Alves, Renata Costa, Michele (2), Cristiane Silva, Daniele | Sudamericano Femenino |
| November 22, 2006 | Uruguay | W | 6–0 | Daniela Alves (2), Grazielle (2), Elaine, Cristiane Silva | Sudamericano Femenino |
| November 24, 2006 | Paraguay | W | 6–0 | Cristiane Silva (4), Daniela Alves, Renata Costa | Sudamericano Femenino |
| November 26, 2006 | Argentina | L | 0–2 | - | Sudamericano Femenino |

The Brazil women's national football team competed in the following competitions in 2006:

| Competition | Performance |
|---|---|
| Peace Queen Cup | Group stage |
| Sudamericano Femenino | Runner-up |

=== Domestic competition champions ===
| Competition | Champion |
|---|---|
| Campeonato Carioca | CEPE-Caxias |
| Campeonato Paulista | Botucatu |
| Taça Brasil | Botucatu |
