= 2006 South American Women's Football Championship =

Campeonato Sudamericano de Fútbol Femenino de 2006

Tournament details
- Host country: Argentina
- Dates: 10–26 November
- Teams: 10 (from 1 confederation)
- Venue: 1 (in 1 host city)

Final positions
- Champions: Argentina (1st title)
- Runners-up: Brazil
- Third place: Uruguay
- Fourth place: Paraguay

Tournament statistics
- Matches played: 26
- Goals scored: 95 (3.65 per match)
- Top scorer: (Brazil) Cristiane (12 goals)
- Fair play award: Paraguay

The 2006 South American Women's Football Championship (Campeonato Sudamericano de Fútbol Femenino 2006) was the fifth staging of the South American Women's Football Championship (now known as Copa América Femenina) and determined the CONMEBOL's qualifiers for the 2007 FIFA Women's World Cup and the 2008 Olympic Games football tournament. The tournament was held between 10 and 26 November in the Argentine city of Mar del Plata.

The hosts Argentina won the tournament for the first time and qualified to their second FIFA Women's World Cup and their first Olympic tournament. Runners-up Brazil also qualified for the World Cup; but had to face Ghana in a play-off to qualify to the Olympics.

== Venue ==
Like in the 1998 edition, the only venue used for the tournament was the Estadio José María Minella, also known as Estadio Mundialista.

Mar del Plata
Estadio José María Minella
Capacity: 35.354
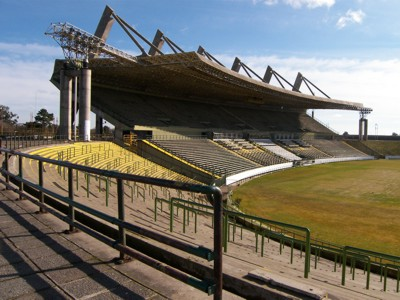

== Officials ==
The following referees and assistant referees were named for the tournament:

Country	Referee	Assistant
Argentina	Estela Álvarez de Olivera; Salomé di Iorio; Florencia Romano	—
Bolivia	María Teresa Alvarado; Cándida Colque	Aracely Castro
Brazil	—	Ana Paula Oliveira
Chile	—	Bárbra Bastías
Colombia	Adriana Correa	—
Ecuador	—	Rosa Canales
Paraguay	Norma González	Estela Ayala; Cynthia Franco
Peru	—	Marlene Leyton
Uruguay	Patricia da Silva; Alejandra Trucidos	Laura Geymonat
Venezuela	Marilyn Ángulo	—

== Results ==
The tournament format is similar to the 1998 edition. It features a first round, where the ten teams are divided into two groups of five teams each. The top two teams in the groups advance to a final round, instead of a knockout stage.

The final round was set up in a round-robin format, where each team played one match against each of the other teams within the group. The top two teams in the group qualified for the 2007 FIFA Women's World Cup in the People's Republic of China, and the first-placed team won the tournament.

Three points were awarded for a win, one point for a draw, and zero points for a loss.

Tie-breaking criteria

Teams were ranked on the following criteria:

1. Greater number of points in all group matches
2. Goal difference in all group matches
3. Greater number of goals scored in all group matches
4. Head-to-head results
5. Drawing of lots by the CONMEBOL Organising Committee

Key to colours in group tables
Group winners and runners-up advance to the final round

- Times listed were UTC–3.

=== First round ===
==== Group A ====
Team	Pld	W	D	L	GF	GA	GD	Pts
Argentina	4	4	0	0	17	1	+16	12
Uruguay	4	2	0	2	4	4	0	6
Ecuador	4	1	1	2	4	5	−1	4
Colombia	4	1	1	2	4	11	−7	4
Chile	4	1	0	3	5	13	−8	3

10 November 2006
17:15

Chile	1–2	Ecuador
Reyes 34'	Report	Velarde 39', 50'

Estadio José María Minella, Mar del Plata
Referee: Marilyn Ángulo (Venezuela)
10 November 2006
15:00

Argentina	2–1	Uruguay
Almeida 4'; Potassa 63'	Report	Souza 11'

Estadio José María Minella, Mar del Plata
Referee: Norma González (Paraguay)

12 November 2006
17:15

Colombia	1–0	Uruguay
Moscoso 17'	Report

Estadio José María Minella, Mar del Plata
Referee: María Alvarado (Bolivia)
12 November 2006
15:00

Chile	0–8	Argentina
	Report	Potassa 4', 22'; Coronel 8'; Almeida 27'; Ojeda 30'; Gómez 70'; Huber 79'; Hirmbruchner 86'

Estadio José María Minella, Mar del Plata
Referee: Cándida Colque (Bolivia)

14 November 2006
17:15

Ecuador	0–1	Argentina
	Report	Gómez 54'

Estadio José María Minella, Mar del Plata
Referee: María Alvarado (Bolivia)
14 November 2006
15:00

Colombia	1–3	Chile
Gaete 71' (o.g.)	Report	Arias 8'; Quezada 81', 87'

Estadio José María Minella, Mar del Plata
Referee: Norma González (Paraguay)

16 November 2006
17:15

Uruguay	2–1	Chile
Quinteros 43'; Barrera 76' (o.g.)	Report	Quezada 4'

Estadio José María Minella, Mar del Plata
Referee: María Alvarado (Bolivia)
16 November 2006
15:00

Ecuador	2–2	Colombia
Velarde 28'; Vivas 47'	Report	Saavedra 62'; Molina 69'

Estadio José María Minella, Mar del Plata
Referee: Cándida Colque (Bolivia)

18 November 2006
17:15

Argentina	6–0	Colombia
Gómez 3'; Vallejos 21', 52'; Quiñones 27'; Huber 46'; Ojeda 57'	Report

Estadio José María Minella, Mar del Plata
Referee: Marilyn Ángulo (Venezuela)
18 November 2006
15:00

Uruguay	1–0	Ecuador
Laborda 67'	Report

Estadio José María Minella, Mar del Plata
Referee: María Alvarado (Bolivia)

==== Group B ====
Team	Pld	W	D	L	GF	GA	GD	Pts
Brazil	4	4	0	0	18	2	+16	12
Paraguay	4	3	0	1	11	7	+4	9
Venezuela	4	1	1	2	4	10	−6	4
Peru	4	1	0	3	3	7	−4	3
Bolivia	4	0	1	3	4	14	−10	1

11 November 2006
17:15

Bolivia	1–1	Venezuela
Ríos 52'	Report	Espinosa 53'

Estadio José María Minella, Mar del Plata
Referee: Florencia Romano (Argentina)
11 November 2006
15:00

Paraguay	1–4	Brazil
Alarcón 69'	Report	Cristiane 19', 53'; Daniela Alves 46'; Aline 59'

Estadio José María Minella, Mar del Plata
Referee: Adriana Correa (Colombia)

13 November 2006
17:10

Peru	0–2	Brazil
	Report	Cristiane 6'; Elaine 80'

Estadio José María Minella, Mar del Plata
Referee: Patricia da Silva (referee) (Uruguay)
13 November 2006
15:00

Bolivia	1–5	Paraguay
Morón 40'	Report	Ortiz 1'; Quintana 8', 43'; Alarcón 56' (pen.); Martínez 83'

Estadio José María Minella, Mar del Plata
Referee: Jesica Di Iorio (Argentina)

15 November 2006
17:15

Venezuela	1–3	Paraguay
Lovera 20'	Report	Cuevas 63', 81'; Vega 66'

Estadio José María Minella, Mar del Plata
Referee: Estela Álvarez (Argentina)
15 November 2006
15:00

Peru	2–1	Bolivia
Chinchilla 61' (o.g.); Dorador 63'	Report	Zamorano 8'

Estadio José María Minella, Mar del Plata
Referee: Alejandra Trucidos (Uruguay)

17 November 2006
17:15

Brazil	6–1	Bolivia
Daniela Alves 7'; Cristiane 8', 22', 60'; Mônica 13'; Elaine 44'	Report	Morón 43' (pen.)

Estadio José María Minella, Mar del Plata
Referee: Florencia Romano (Argentina)
17 November 2006
15:00

Venezuela	2–0	Peru
Ferrer 29', 73'	Report

Estadio José María Minella, Mar del Plata
Referee: Jesica Di Iorio (Argentina)

19 November 2006
15:00

Paraguay	2–1	Peru
Vega 67', 81' (pen.)	Report	Tristán 87' (pen.)

Estadio José María Minella, Mar del Plata
Referee: Adriana Correa (Colombia)
19 November 2006
17:15

Brazil	6–0	Venezuela
Daniela Alves 1'; Renata Costa 12'; Michele 27', 45'; Cristiane 56'; Daniele 81'	Report

Estadio José María Minella, Mar del Plata
Referee: Estela Álvarez (Argentina)

=== Final round ===
Argentina and Brazil qualified for the 2007 FIFA Women's World Cup and the 2008 Summer Olympics, although second-placed Brazil had to play an inter-continental play-off, which they won against Ghana eventually.

Team	Pld	W	D	L	GF	GA	GD	Pts	Qualification
Argentina	3	2	1	0	4	0	+4	7	2007 FIFA Women's World Cup and 2008 Olympic Games
Brazil	3	2	0	1	12	2	+10	6	2007 FIFA Women's World Cup and 2008 Olympic Games play-off
Uruguay	3	1	0	2	3	10	−7	3	
Paraguay	3	0	1	2	2	9	−7	1	

22 November 2006
15:00

Argentina	0–0	Paraguay
	Report

Estadio José María Minella, Mar del Plata
Referee: María Alvarado (Bolivia)
22 November 2006
17:15

Brazil	6–0	Uruguay
Daniela Alves 11', 23' (pen.); Grazielle 47', 86'; Elaine 64'; Cristiane 72' (pen.)	Report

Estadio José María Minella, Mar del Plata
Referee: Adriana Correa (Colombia)

24 November 2006
15:00

Argentina	2–0	Uruguay
Gerez 71'; Manicler 76'	Report

Estadio José María Minella, Mar del Plata
Referee: Cándida Colque (Bolivia)
24 November 2006
17:15

Brazil	6–0	Paraguay
Cristiane 6', 27' (pen.), 62', 64'; Daniela Alves 36'; Renata Costa 68'	Report

Estadio José María Minella, Mar del Plata
Referee: Marilyn Ángulo (Venezuela)

26 November 2006
15:00

Uruguay	3–2	Paraguay
Souza 27', 62', 67'	Report	Cuevas 17', 44'

Estadio José María Minella, Mar del Plata
Referee: Adriana Correa (Colombia)
26 November 2006
17:15

Argentina	2–0	Brazil
González 66'; Potassa 68'	Report

Estadio José María Minella, Mar del Plata
Attendance: 300
Referee: Patricia da Silva (referee) (Uruguay)

== Awards ==
2006 Sudamericano Femenino winners

Argentina
First title

== Statistics ==
=== Goalscorers ===
12 goals

- (Brazil) Cristiane

6 goals

- (Brazil) Daniela Alves

4 goals

- (Argentina) María Belén Potassa
- (Paraguay) Irma Cuevas
- (Uruguay) Angélica Souza

3 goals

- (Argentina) Rosana Gómez
- (Brazil) Elaine
- (Chile) Nathalie Quezada
- (Ecuador) Mabel Velarde
- (Paraguay) Mónica Vega

2 goals

- (Argentina) Analía Almeida
- (Argentina) Clarisa Huber
- (Argentina) Andrea Ojeda
- (Argentina) Fabiana Vallejos
- (Bolivia) Janeth Morón
- (Brazil) Renata Costa
- (Brazil) Grazielle
- (Brazil) Michele
- (Paraguay) Mirta Alarcón
- (Paraguay) Dulce Quintana
- (Venezuela) Liria Ferrer

1 goal

- (Argentina) Mariela Coronel
- (Argentina) Marisa Gerez
- (Argentina) Eva Nadia González
- (Argentina) Analía Hirmbruchner
- (Argentina) Ludmila Manicler
- (Argentina) Florencia Quiñones
- (Bolivia) Analisse Ríos
- (Bolivia) Maitté Zamorano
- (Brazil) Aline
- (Brazil) Daniele
- (Brazil) Mônica
- (Chile) Valeska Arias
- (Chile) Karina Reyes
- (Colombia) Daniela Molina
- (Colombia) Luisa Moscoso
- (Colombia) Yulied Saavedra
- (Ecuador) Marianela Vivas
- (Paraguay) Lourdes Martínez
- (Paraguay) Lourdes Ortiz
- (Peru) Gladys Dorador
- (Peru) Miryam Tristán
- (Uruguay) Alejandra Laborda
- (Uruguay) Carla Quinteros
- (Venezuela) Haidlyn Espinosa
- (Venezuela) Elvis Lovera

Own goals

- (Bolivia) Guadalupe Chinchilla (playing against Peru)
- (Chile) María José Barrera (playing against Uruguay)
- (Chile) Belén Gaete (playing against Colombia)

=== Final ranking ===
Pos	Team	Pld	W	D	L	GF	GA	GD	Pts
1	Argentina	7	6	1	0	21	1	+20	19
2	Brazil	7	6	0	1	30	4	+26	18
3	Uruguay	7	3	0	4	7	14	–7	9
4	Paraguay	7	3	1	3	13	16	–3	10
Eliminated in the first round
5	Ecuador	4	1	1	2	4	5	−1	4
6	Venezuela	4	1	1	2	4	10	−6	4
7	Colombia	4	1	1	2	4	11	−7	4
8	Peru	4	1	0	3	3	7	−4	3
9	Chile	4	1	0	3	5	13	−8	3
10	Bolivia	4	0	1	3	4	14	−10	1
