= Alejandra Laborda =

Uruguayan footballer (born 1978)

Personal information
- Full name: Alejandra Judith Laborda Ramos
- Date of birth: 2 December 1978 (age 47)
- Place of birth: Uruguay
- Position: Midfielder

Senior career*
Years	Team	Apps	(Gls)
1997	Danubio		
1998–2009	Rampla Juniors		
2010	River Plate Montevideo		
2012	Peñarol		
2013	River Plate Montevideo		
2015–2016	River Plate Montevideo		
2017–2018	Miramar Misiones		
2019	Rampla Juniors		

International career^{‡}
2003–2006	Uruguay	9	(1)
- * Club domestic league appearances and goals ‡ National team caps and goals as of 26 November 2006.

Alejandra Judith Laborda Ramos (born 2 December 1978) is a Uruguayan former footballer who played as a midfielder. She has been a member of the Uruguay women's national team.

== Club career ==
At the club level, Laborda has played for Rampla Juniors in Uruguay.

== International career ==
Laborda capped for Uruguay at senior level during two Copa América Femenina editions (2003 and 2006).

=== International goals ===
Scores and results list Uruguay's goal tally first

No.	Date	Venue	Opponent	Score	Result	Competition	Ref.
1	18 November 2006	Estadio José María Minella, Mar del Plata, Argentina	Ecuador	1–0	1–0	2006 South American Women's Football Championship	
