= Elvis Lovera =

Venezuelan footballer (born 1986)

Personal information
- Full name: Elvis Yamilet Lovera Espinoza
- Date of birth: 13 August 1986 (age 40)
- Position: Defender

Senior career*
Years	Team	Apps	(Gls)
- Flor de Patria
- Caracas

International career^{‡}
2006	Venezuela U20		
2006	Venezuela	4	(1)
- * Club domestic league appearances and goals ‡ National team caps and goals as of 19 November 2006

Elvis Yamilet Lovera Espinoza (born 13 August 1986), also known as Yamilet Lovera, is a Venezuelan footballer who plays as a defender. She has been a member of the Venezuela women's national team.

== Early life ==
Lovera was raised in San Juan de los Morros, Guárico.

== Club career ==
Lovera has played for Flor de Patria FC and Caracas FC in Venezuela.

== International career ==
Lovera represented Venezuela at the 2006 South American U-20 Women's Championship. She capped at senior level during the 2006 South American Women's Football Championship.

=== International goals ===
Scores and results list Venezuela's goal tally first

No.	Date	Venue	Opponent	Score	Result	Competition	Ref.
1	15 November 2006	Estadio José María Minella, Mar del Plata, Argentina	Paraguay	1–3	1–3	2006 South American Women's Football Championship	
