= Angélica Souza =

Uruguayan footballer (born 1979)

Personal information
- Date of birth: 11 February 1979 (age 47)
- Place of birth: Montevideo, Uruguay
- Position: Forward

Team information
- Current team: Rampla Juniors

Senior career*
Years	Team	Apps	(Gls)
2001	Peñarol		(2)
2002	Cerro		(7)
2004–2007	Rampla Juniors		(31)
2007–20??	River Plate Montevideo		
20??–201?	Nacional		
2019–	Rampla Juniors	12	(7)

International career^{‡}
2003–2006	Uruguay	7	(4)
- * Club domestic league appearances and goals ‡ National team caps and goals as of 26 November 2006

Angélica Souza (born 11 February 1979) is a Uruguayan footballer who plays as a forward for Rampla Juniors. She has been a member of the Uruguay women's national team.

== Club career ==
Souza played in Uruguay for Peñarol, Cerro, Rampla Juniors, River Plate and Nacional.

== International career ==
Souza capped for Uruguay at senior level during two Copa América Femenina editions (2003 and 2006).

=== International goals ===
Scores and results list Uruguay's goal tally first

No.	Date	Venue	Opponent	Score	Result	Competition	Ref.
1	10 November 2006	Estadio José María Minella, Mar del Plata, Argentina	Argentina	1–1	1–2	2006 South American Women's Football Championship	
2	26 November 2006	Estadio José María Minella, Mar del Plata, Argentina	Paraguay	1–1	3–2	2006 South American Women's Football Championship	
3	26 November 2006	Estadio José María Minella, Mar del Plata, Argentina	Paraguay	2–2	3–2	2006 South American Women's Football Championship	
4	26 November 2006	Estadio José María Minella, Mar del Plata, Argentina	Paraguay	3–2	3–2	2006 South American Women's Football Championship	
