= Belén Potassa =

Argentine footballer (born 1988)

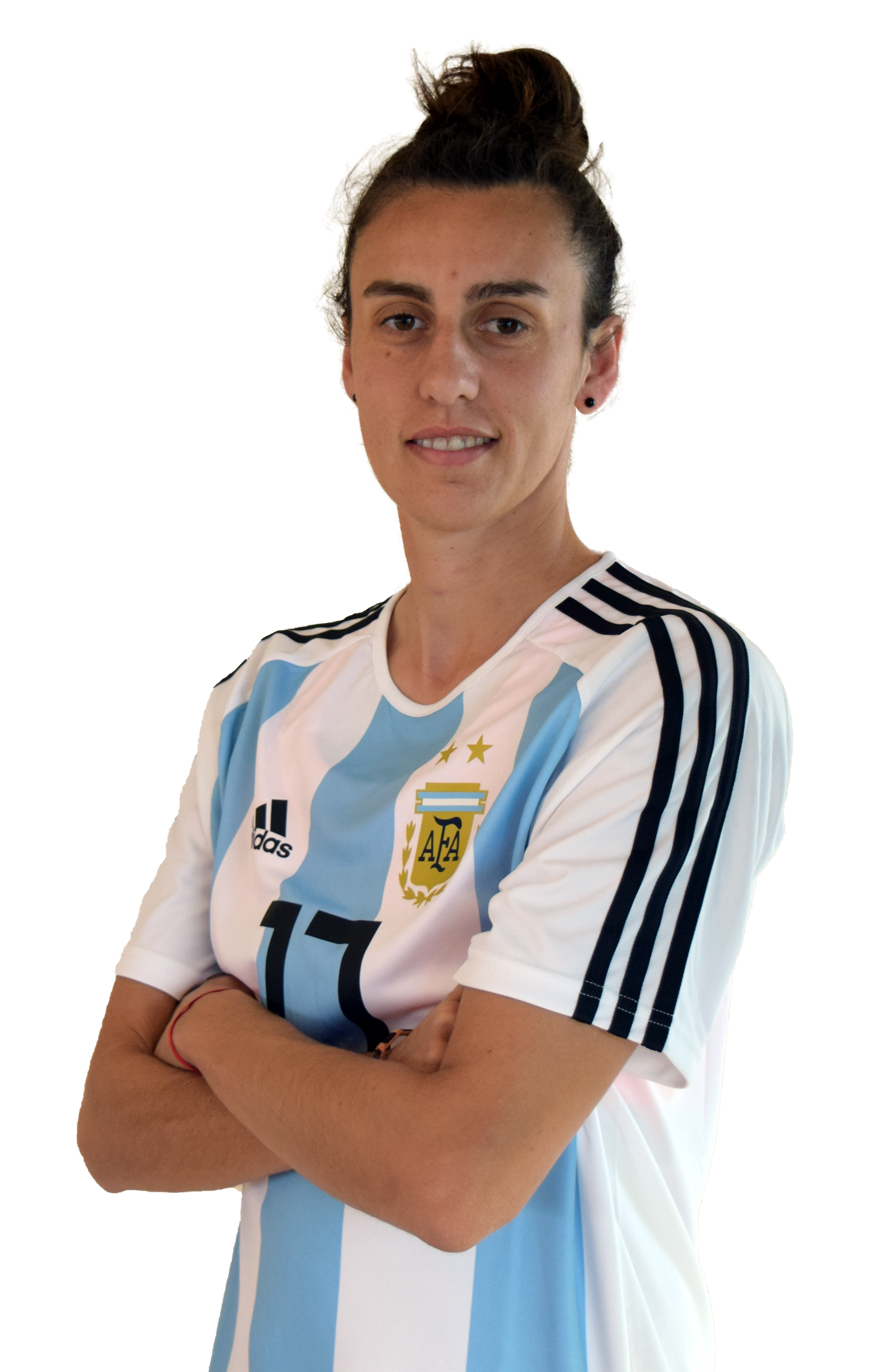

Personal information
- Full name: María Belén Potassa
- Date of birth: 12 December 1988 (age 37)
- Place of birth: Cañada Rosquín, Santa Fe, Argentina
- Height: 1.69 m (5 ft 7 in)
- Position: Forward

Team information
- Current team: Peluquería Mixta Friol

Senior career*
Years	Team	Apps	(Gls)
2004–2007	Rosario Central		
2007	San Lorenzo		
2007–2010	Santiago Morning		
2010–2014	Boca Juniors		
2014–2019	UAI Urquiza		
2019–2020	Fundación Albacete	4	(3)
2020-2021	Cordoba CF	15	(3)
2021-2022	Real Unión de Tenerife	26	(8)
2022	Monte		
2023-2024	FF La Solana	40	(3)
2024-	Peluquería Mixta Friol		

International career^{‡}
2006–2008	Argentina U-20	10+	(6)
2006–2019	Argentina	17	(5)
2006–2007	Argentina XI	2	(2)
- * Club domestic league appearances and goals as of 28 September 2019 ‡ National team caps and goals as of 00:40, 14 June 2019 (UTC)

María Belén Potassa (born 12 December 1988), known as Belén Potassa, is an Argentine footballer who plays as a forward for Peluquería Mixta Friol. She has been a member of the Argentina women's national team.

She previously played for the women's teams of Rosario Central, San Lorenzo, Santiago Morning (in Chile) and Boca Juniors before joining UAI Urquiza in July 2014.

== International career ==
Potassa represented Argentina at the 2006 South American U-20 Women's Championship, 2006 FIFA U-20 Women's World Championship and the 2008 FIFA U-20 Women's World Cup. At senior level, she played the 2006 South American Women's Football Championship, three Pan American Games editions (2007, 2011 and 2015), (Note: 2015 Pan American Games matches are not recognised by FIFA.) the 2007 FIFA Women's World Cup, the 2008 Summer Olympics and the 2018 Copa América Femenina.

=== International goals ===
Scores and results list Argentina's goal tally first

No.	Date	Venue	Opponent	Score	Result	Competition
1	10 November 2006	Estadio José María Minella, Mar del Plata, Argentina	Uruguay	2–1	2–1	2006 South American Women's Football Championship
2	12 November 2006	Estadio José María Minella, Mar del Plata, Argentina	Chile	1–0	8–0	2006 South American Women's Football Championship
3	12 November 2006	Estadio José María Minella, Mar del Plata, Argentina	Chile	3–0	8–0	2006 South American Women's Football Championship
4	26 November 2006	Estadio José María Minella, Mar del Plata, Argentina	Brazil	2–0	2–0	2006 South American Women's Football Championship
5	11 July 2015	Hamilton Pan Am Soccer Stadium, Hamilton, Canada	Trinidad and Tobago	2–1	2–2	2015 Pan American Games

== Personal life ==
Potassa also holds Spanish citizenship, her full name in that document being María Belén Potassa Ríos (Note: In this Spanish name, the first or paternal surname is Potassa and the second or maternal family name is Ríos.).
