= History of rugby union matches between Argentina and Italy =

Argentina first played against Italy in 1978 in Rovigo, with Italy running out 19–6 winners. They next met in the Rugby World Cup (RWC) in 1987, Argentina coming out on top 25–16. Since then, Argentina have had the better record.

== Summary ==
=== Overall ===
Details	Played	Won by Argentina	Won by Italy	Drawn	Argentina points	Italy points
In Argentina	9	7	2	0	252	155
In Italy	13	11	2	0	343	211
Neutral	3	1	1	1	68	65
Overall	25	19	5	1	663	431

=== Records ===
Note: Date shown in brackets indicates when the record was or last set.

Record	Argentina	Italy
Longest winning streak	10 (15 November 2008 – present)	1 (24 October 1978) (Note: Italy have never beaten Argentina in consecutive matches. The longest period of time from their one win was 8 years and 216 days between 1978 and 1987.)
Largest points for
Home	38 (14 July 2001)	23 (7 November 1998)
Away	50 (9 November 2024)	31 (4 June 1995)
Largest winning margin
Home	21 (14 July 2001)	13 (24 October 1978)
Away	32 (16 November 2002; 9 November 2024)	6 (4 June 1995)

== Results ==
No.	Date	Venue	Score	Winner	Competition
1	24 October 1978	Stadio Comunale, Rovigo	19–6	Italy	1978 Argentina tour of Great Britain, Ireland and Italy
2	28 May 1987	Lancaster Park, Christchurch (New Zealand)	25–16	Argentina	1987 Rugby World Cup
3	24 June 1989	Estadio José Amalfitani, Buenos Aires	21–16	Argentina	1989 Italy tour of Argentina
4	4 June 1995	Buffalo City Stadium, East London (South Africa)	25–31	Italy	1995 Rugby World Cup
5	17 October 1995	Estadio Atlético Tucumán, San Miguel de Tucumán	26–6	Argentina	1995 Latin Cup
6	22 October 1997	Stade Antoine-Béguère, Lourdes (France)	18–18	draw	1997 Latin Cup
7	7 November 1998	Stadio Leonardo Garilli, Piacenza	23–19	Italy	1998 Argentina tour of Japan and Europe
8	14 July 2001	Estadio Ricardo Etcheverry, Buenos Aires	38–17	Argentina	2001 Italy tour of Africa and South America
9	16 November 2002	Stadio Flaminio, Rome	6–38	Argentina	2002 Argentina tour of South Africa and Europe
10	11 June 2005	Estadio Padre Martearena, Salta	35–21	Argentina	2005 Italy tour of Argentina and Australia
11	17 June 2005	Estadio Olímpico, Córdoba	29–30	Italy	2005 Italy tour of Argentina and Australia
12	19 November 2005	Stadio Luigi Ferraris, Genoa	22–39	Argentina	2005 Autumn International
13	18 November 2006	Stadio Flaminio, Rome	16–23	Argentina	2006 Autumn International
14	9 June 2007	Estadio Malvinas Argentinas, Mendoza	24–6	Argentina	2007 July Test
15	28 June 2008	Estadio Olímpico, Córdoba	12–13	Italy	2008 July Test
16	15 November 2008	Stadio Olimpico di Torino, Turin	14–22	Argentina	2008 Autumn International
17	13 November 2010	Stadio Marc'Antonio Bentegodi, Verona	16–22	Argentina	2010 Autumn International
18	9 June 2012	Estadio San Juan del Bicentenario, San Juan	37–22	Argentina	2012 July Test
19	23 November 2013	Stadio Olimpico, Rome	14–19	Argentina	2013 Autumn International
20	15 November 2014	Stadio Luigi Ferraris, Genoa	18–20	Argentina	2014 Autumn International
21	11 June 2016	Estadio Colón, Santa Fe	30–24	Argentina	2016 June Test
22	18 November 2017	Stadio Artemio Franchi, Florence	15–31	Argentina	2017 Autumn International
23	13 November 2021	Stadio Comunale di Monigo, Treviso	16–37	Argentina	2021 Argentina tour of Europe
24	9 November 2024	Stadio Friuli, Udine	18–50	Argentina	2024 Autumn International
25	14 November 2026	Stadio Luigi Ferraris, Genoa	14–19	Argentina	2026 Nations Championship

== List of series ==
Played	Won by Argentina	Won by Italy	Drawn
1	0	1	0

Year	Argentina	Italy	Series winner
2005	1	1	Draw
