= Analía Hirmbruchner =

Argentine footballer (born 1989)

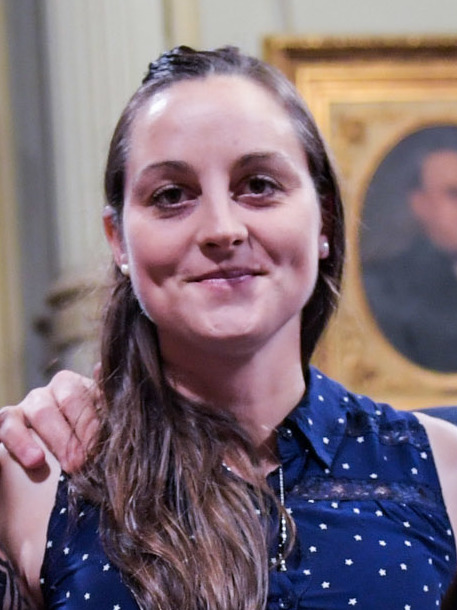

Personal information
- Date of birth: 10 January 1989 (age 37)
- Height: 1.66 m (5 ft 5 1/2 in)
- Position: Midfielder

Senior career*
| Years | Team | Apps | (Gls) |
- River Plate
- Independiente
| –2013 | UAI Urquiza | | |

International career
| 2006 | Argentina U20 | 3 | (0) |
| 2006–2010 | Argentina | 7+ | (1) |
- * Club domestic league appearances and goals

Analía Hirmbruchner (born 10 January 1989) is an Argentine retired footballer who played as a midfielder. She was a member of the Argentina women's national team.

== Club career ==
Hirmbruchner played for River Plate, Independiente and UAI Urquiza. She retired in 2013 at age 24.

== International career ==
Hirmbruchner represented Argentina at the 2006 FIFA U-20 Women's World Championship. At senior level, she played two South American Women's Football Championship editions (2006 and 2010).

=== International goals ===
Scores and results list Argentina's goal tally first

| No. | Date | Venue | Opponent | Score | Result | Competition |
|---|---|---|---|---|---|---|
| 1 | 12 November 2006 | Estadio José María Minella, Mar del Plata, Argentina | Chile | 8–0 | 8–0 | 2006 South American Women's Football Championship |
