= Irma Cuevas =

Paraguayan footballer (born 1976)

Personal information
- Date of birth: 1976 (age 49–50)
- Place of birth: Pirayú, Paraguay
- Position: Forward

Team information
- Current team: Guaraní

Senior career*
Years	Team	Apps	(Gls)
1997-2003	Nacional		
2003-2013	UAA		
2013	Arkadia Aleman		
2014-2017	UAA		
2017-2019	Guarani		
2019	Sportivo Ameliano		
2020	Nacional		
2021-2023	Sportivo Ameliano		
- * Club domestic league appearances and goals

Irma Cuevas (born 1976) is a Paraguayan footballer who plays as forward for Paraguayan club Guaraní and has played with the Paraguay women's national team. She is one of the longest active players who have played in Paraguay's first women's tournament.

== Premiere division career ==
Cuevas began playing for Nacional before moving to Guaraní. She has scored more than 600 goals. In 2017 she was the country's all-time top goal scorer.

== International career ==
Cuevas represented Paraguay in the South American Women's Football Championship in 1998 and 2006.

=== International goals ===
Scores and results list Paraguay's goal tally first

No.	Date	Venue	Opponent	Score	Result	Competition
1	1 March 1998	Estadio José María Minella, Mar del Plata, Argentina	Uruguay	not accounted	3-2	1998 South American Women's Football Championship
2	1 March 1998	Estadio José María Minella, Mar del Plata, Argentina	Uruguay	not accounted	3-2	1998 South American Women's Football Championship
3	8 March 1998	Estadio José María Minella, Mar del Plata, Argentina	Bolivia	not accounted	2-3	1998 South American Women's Football Championship
4	8 March 1998	Estadio José María Minella, Mar del Plata, Argentina	Bolivia	not accounted	2-3	1998 South American Women's Football Championship
5	15 November 2006	Estadio José María Minella, Mar del Plata, Argentina	Venezuela	1-1	3-1	2006 South American Women's Football Championship
6	15 November 2006	Estadio José María Minella, Mar del Plata, Argentina	Venezuela	3-1	3-1	2006 South American Women's Football Championship
7	26 November 2006	Estadio José María Minella, Mar del Plata, Argentina	Uruguay	1-0	2-3	Final round, 2006 South American Women's Football Championship
8	26 November 2006	Estadio José María Minella, Mar del Plata, Argentina	Uruguay	2-1	2-3	Final round, 2006 South American Women's Football Championship
