= Marianela Vivas =

Ecuadorian footballer (born 1978)

Personal information
- Full name: Marianela Virginia Vivas Perea
- Date of birth: 11 January 1978 (age 48)
- Place of birth: Esmeraldas, Ecuador
- Position: Forward

Senior career*
Years	Team	Apps	(Gls)
2002–2006	Todas Estrellas		
2006	Guayas selection		
2007–2010	Todas Estrellas		
2010	Guayas selection		
2011–201?	Todas Estrellas		

International career^{‡}
2003–2006	Ecuador	6	(1)
- * Club domestic league appearances and goals ‡ National team caps and goals as of 18 November 2006

Marianela Virginia Vivas Perea (born 11 January 1978) is an Ecuadorian retired footballer who played as a forward. She has been a member of the Ecuador women's national team.

== International career ==
Vivas played for Ecuador at senior level in two South American Women's Football Championship editions (2003 and 2006).

=== International goals ===
Scores and results list Ecuador's goal tally first

No.	Date	Venue	Opponent	Score	Result	Competition
1	16 November 2006	Estadio José María Minella, Mar del Plata, Argentina	Colombia	2–0	2–2	2006 South American Women's Football Championship
