= Juliana Castro =

Uruguayan footballer (born 1991)

Personal information
- Full name: Juliana Castro Irizábal
- Date of birth: 28 June 1991 (age 35)
- Place of birth: Trinidad, Flores, Uruguay
- Position: Forward

Youth career
- 1996–2004: Porongos
- 2004–2005: Inau

College career
Years	Team	Apps	(Gls)
2010	Missouri Valley Vikings		

Senior career*
Years	Team	Apps	(Gls)
2006	Inau		(15)
2007	River Plate		(24)
2008	Sportivo Artigas de Sauce		(29)
2008–2009	Rampla Juniors		(58)
2011–2015	Nacional	26	(37)
2015–2017	River Plate	44	(56)
2018–2022	Nacional	55	(78)

International career
- Uruguay U-20
2006	Uruguay	7	(0)
- * Club domestic league appearances and goals

Juliana Castro Irizábal (born 28 June 1991) is a Uruguayan footballer who plays as a forward for Club Nacional de Football. She has been a member of the Uruguay women's national team.

== College career ==
Castro attended the Missouri Valley College in the United States.

== Club career ==
Castro played in Uruguay for Inau, River Plate, Sportivo Artigas de Sauce, Rampla Juniors and Nacional.

== International career ==
Castro played for Uruguay at senior level in two Copa América Femenina editions (2006 and 2010).

== Personal life ==
Castro's older brother, Gonzalo Castro, is also a professional footballer who plays for Club Nacional de Football as a winger.
