= Football at the 2007 Pan American Games – Women's tournament =

Women's football tournament at the 2007 Pan American Games
- Venue: Rio de Janeiro
- Dates: 12 – 26 July

Medalists
Gold medal	Brazil
Silver medal	United States
Bronze medal	Canada

The women's association football tournament at the 2007 Pan American Games took place from 12 to 26 July 2007.

== Teams ==
The number of teams was expanded to 10 teams for this edition, with no age limit. The participants were:

- CONCACAF
  - Canada
  - United States
  - Mexico
  - Jamaica
  - Panama
- CONMEBOL
  - Brazil
  - Argentina
  - Uruguay
  - Paraguay
  - Ecuador

== Preliminary round ==
=== Group A ===
Pos	Team	Pld	W	D	L	GF	GA	GD	Pts
1	Brazil	4	4	0	0	26	0	+26	12
2	Canada	4	3	0	1	22	8	+14	9
3	Jamaica	4	1	1	2	3	17	−14	4
4	Ecuador	4	1	0	3	4	17	−13	3
5	Uruguay	4	0	1	3	3	16	−13	1

12 July 2007
14:00

Ecuador	0–1	Jamaica
		Vincent 47'

Estádio Miécimo da Silva, Rio de Janeiro
Referee: Antequera (BOL)

12 July 2007
14:00

Brazil	4–0	Uruguay
Daniela 2', 69'; Cristiane 15'; Rosana 35'

Estádio Olímpico João Havelange, Rio de Janeiro
Referee: Cerdas (CRC)

14 July 2007
11:15

Uruguay	0–7	Canada
		Sinclair 7', 70', 84'; Hermus 38', 89'; Matheson 53'; Tancredi 80'

Estádio Miécimo da Silva, Rio de Janeiro

14 July 2007
15:30

Jamaica	0–5	Brazil
		Kátia 9', 52'; Daniela 23'; Marta 65' (pen.); Cristiane 85' (pen.)

Estádio Olímpico João Havelange, Rio de Janeiro

16 July 2007
14:00

Jamaica	1–1	Uruguay
Mayra Padrón 7' (o.g.)		Castro 67' (pen.)

Estádio Miécimo da Silva, Rio de Janeiro

16 July 2007
15:30

Canada	4–0	Ecuador
Neil 13'; Lang 24', 30', 50'

Estádio Olímpico João Havelange, Rio de Janeiro

18 July 2007
11:15

Brazil	10–0	Ecuador
Cristiane 10', 27', 30', 47'; Daniela 18'; Marta 35', 56', 74', 90'; Pretinha 66'

Estádio Olímpico João Havelange, Rio de Janeiro

18 July 2007
11:15

Jamaica	1–11	Canada
Reid 60'		Sinclair 17', 24', 39', 45+1'; Kiss 32'; Wilkinson 41'; Vermeulen 42'; Lang 49'; Thorlakson 61', 84'; Neil 73'

Centro de Futebol Zico, Rio de Janeiro

20 July 2007
15:00

Brazil	7–0	Canada
Marta 25', 52', 72', 85', 88'; Rosana 50'; Daniela 66'

Estádio do Maracanã, Rio de Janeiro

20 July 2007
15:00

Uruguay	2–4	Ecuador
Castro 35' (pen.), 74'		Freire 12' (pen.); Quinteros 22', 86'; Pesantes 62'

Estádio Miécimo da Silva, Rio de Janeiro

=== Group B ===
Pos	Team	Pld	W	D	L	GF	GA	GD	Pts
1	United States	4	3	0	1	15	5	+10	9
2	Mexico	4	3	0	1	10	3	+7	9
3	Argentina	4	3	0	1	8	5	+3	9
4	Panama	4	0	1	3	2	8	−6	1
5	Paraguay	4	0	1	3	4	18	−14	1

12 July 2007
11:15

Argentina	2–0	Panama
Quiñones 16'; Huber 63'

Estádio Miécimo da Silva, Rio de Janeiro
Referee: Vera (ECU)

12 July 2007
18:15

United States	7–1	Paraguay
O'Hara 16', 51'; Cheney 18', 37', 49'; Nogueira 66'; McDonald 68'		Alarcón 2'

Estádio Olímpico João Havelange, Rio de Janeiro
Referee: Beltrame (BRA)

14 July 2007
14:00

United States	3–1	Panama
O'Hara 37'; Cheney 40'; Heath 53'		De Mera 21'

Estádio Miécimo da Silva, Rio de Janeiro
Referee: De oliveira (BRA)

14 July 2007
18:15

Paraguay	0–5	Mexico
		Valdez 20'; Ocampo 28', 82'; Corral 70', 89'

Estádio Olímpico João Havelange, Rio de Janeiro

16 July 2007
11:15

Panama	1–1	Paraguay
Samuels 9'		Agüero 90+'

Estádio Miécimo da Silva, Rio de Janeiro

16 July 2007
18:15

Mexico	0–1	Argentina
		González 90+'

Estádio Olímpico João Havelange, Rio de Janeiro

18 July 2007
09:00

United States	3–0	Argentina
Washington 20'; Nogueira 44'; McDonald 90+'

Estádio Olímpico João Havelange, Rio de Janeiro

18 July 2007
10:00

Panama	0–2	Mexico
		Worbis 5', 28' (pen.)

Estádio Miécimo da Silva, Rio de Janeiro
Referee: Cerdas

20 July 2007
12:30

Argentina	5–2	Paraguay
Gomez 23', 53'; Ojeda 34', 67'; Gatti 73'		Vega 2'; Rojas 87'

Estádio Miécimo da Silva, Rio de Janeiro

20 July 2007
12:30

Mexico	3–2	United States
López 62', 64'; Worbis 79' (pen.)		Nogueira 24'; O'Hara 57'

Estádio do Maracanã, Rio de Janeiro

== Final round ==
Semi-finals
23 July – Rio de Janeiro (Maracanã)
Brazil	2
Mexico	0
23 July – Rio de Janeiro (Miécimo da Silva)
United States	2
Canada	1

Final
26 July – Rio de Janeiro (Maracanã)
Brazil	5
United States	0
Third place
26 July – Rio de Janeiro (Maracanã)
Mexico	1
Canada	2

=== Semifinals ===
23 July 2007
15:00

Brazil	2– 0	Mexico
Rosana Augusto 60', 66'

Estádio do Maracanã, Rio de Janeiro

23 July 2007
19:00

United States	2– 1	Canada
Cheney 18', 77'		Lang 88'

Estádio Miécimo da Silva, Rio de Janeiro

=== Bronze-medal match ===
26 July 2007
9:00

Mexico	1–2	Canada
Worbis 65' (pen.)		Sinclair 21'; Kiss 47+'

Estádio do Maracanã, Rio de Janeiro

=== Gold-medal match ===
26 July 2007
12:00

Brazil	5–0	United States
Marta 18' (pen.), 56' (pen.); Cristiane 29', 47'; Daniela Alves 75'	Report

Estádio do Maracanã, Rio de Janeiro
Attendance: 67,788
Referee: Fernando Cabrera

Brasil	United States

GK	1	Andréia
DF	16	Tânia
DF	3	Aline
DF	4	Renata Costa
MF	6	Rosana	(substituted off) 83'
MF	8	Formiga
MF	5	Elaine
MF	7	Daniela
FW	15	Maycon
FW	10	Marta
FW	11	Cristiane	(substituted off) 78'
Substitutions:
DF	2	Simone
FW	9	Kátia	(substituted on) 83'
GK	12	Bárbara
FW	14	Pretinha	(substituted on) 78'
MF	17	Grazielle
DF	18	Daiane
MF	20	Ester
Manager:
(Brazil) Jorge Barcellos

GK	1	Alyssa Naeher
DF	2	Brittany Taylor	(yellow card) 43'
DF	6	Nikki Marshall
DF	16	Lauren Wilmoth		(substituted off) 46'
DF	4	Kaley Fountain
MF	12	Kylie Wright
MF	11	Tobin Heath
MF	15	Becky Edwards
MF	7	Casey Nogueira
FW	17	Kelley O'Hara
FW	8	Lauren Cheney (c)
Substitutions:
MF	3	Nikki Washington
MF	5	Teresa Noyola
FW	9	Jessica McDonald
FW	10	Michelle Enyeart		(substituted on) 46'
DF	13	Lauren Barnes
MF	14	Gina DiMartino
GK	18	Chantel Jones
Manager:
(England) Jill Ellis

2007 Pan American Games Women's football tournament
Winners

Brazil
2nd title

== Final ranking ==
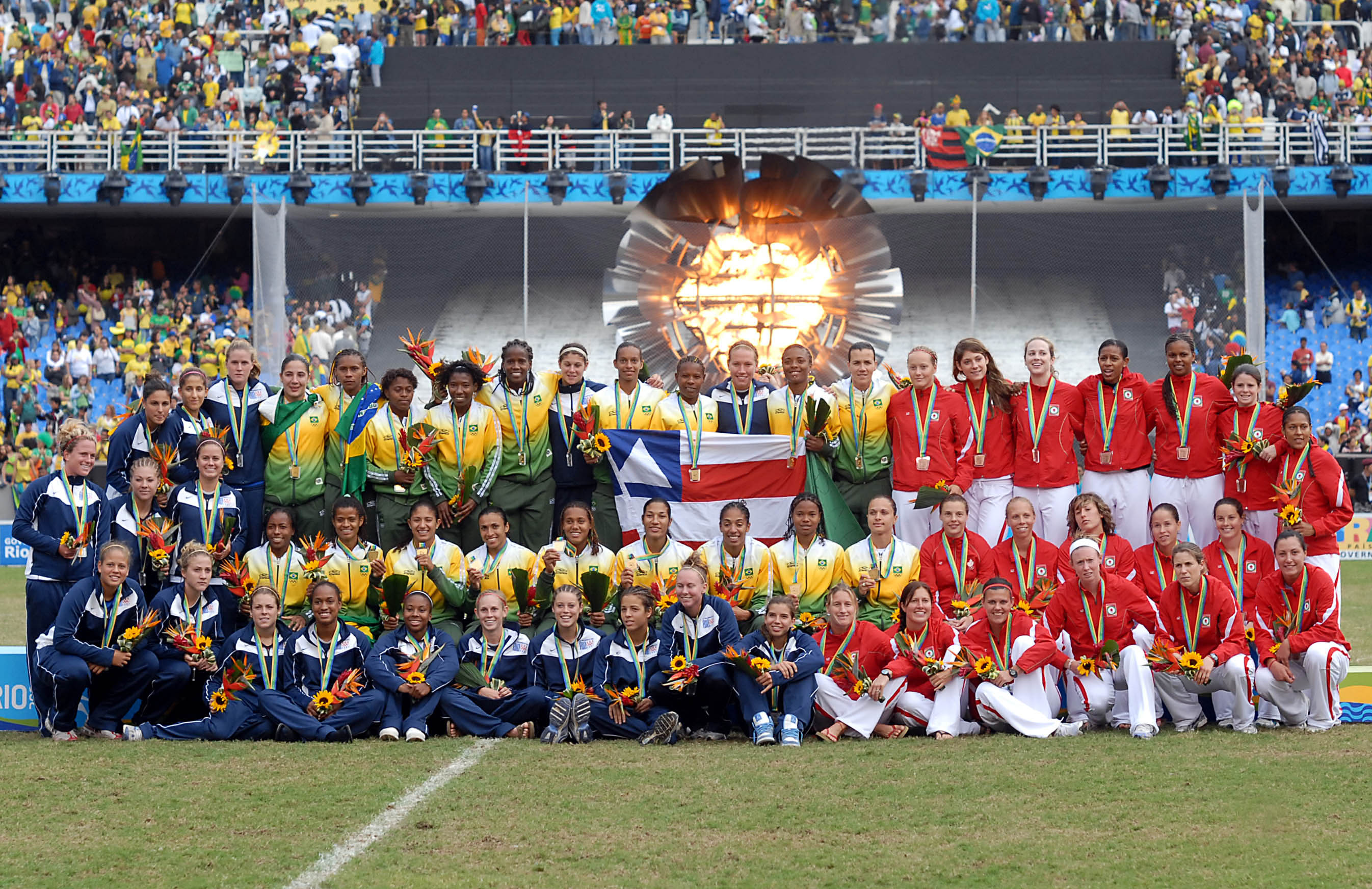
Brazil (gold), the USA (silver) and Canada (bronze) make up the podium for Women's Football at the 2007 Pan American Games in Rio de Janeiro

Place	Team
Gold medal	Brazil
Silver medal	United States
Bronze medal	Canada
4	Mexico
5	Argentina
6	Jamaica
7	Ecuador
8	Panama
9	Uruguay
10	Paraguay
