= Janeth Morón =

Bolivian footballer and futsal player (born 1988)

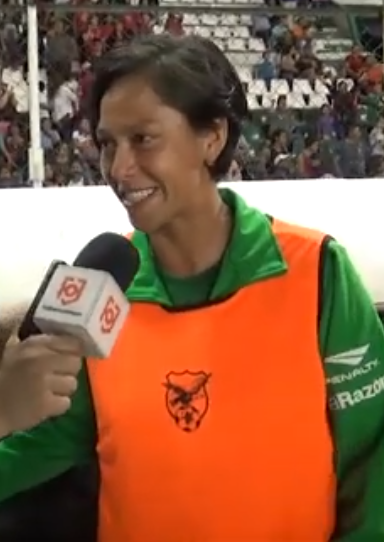
- At a friendly against Puerto Rico in 2019

Personal information
- Full name: Janeth Morón Villarroel
- Date of birth: 2 June 1988 (age 38)
- Height: 1.69 m (5 ft 7 in)
- Position: Forward

Team information
- Current team: Mundo Futuro

Senior career*
Years	Team	Apps	(Gls)
- Universidad (Santa Cruz)
- Mundo Futuro
- Deportivo Ita
- Mundo Futuro

International career^{‡}
2006	Bolivia U20	2+	(3)
2006–2018	Bolivia	7+	(5+)
2017	Bolivia (futsal)	2+	(2+)
- * Club domestic league appearances and goals ‡ National team caps and goals as of 13 April 2018

Janeth Morón Villarroel (born 2 June 1988) is a Bolivian footballer who plays as a forward for Mundo Futuro and the Bolivia women's national team. She is also a futsal player, who appeared at the 2017 Copa América Femenina de Futsal for Bolivia.

== Early life ==
Morón hails from the Santa Cruz Department.

== Club career ==
On 18 August 2019, Morón won the Simón Bolívar Women's Cup playing for Mundo Futuro-Oriente Petrolero, scoring twice, and through that victory the team qualified for the 2019 Copa Libertadores Femenina.

== International career ==
Morón represented Bolivia at the 2006 South American U-20 Women's Championship. At senior level, she played in three Copa América Femenina editions (2006, 2014 and 2018).

=== International goals ===
Scores and results list Bolivia's goal tally first

No.	Date	Venue	Opponent	Score	Result	Competition
1	13 November 2006	Estadio José María Minella, Mar del Plata, Argentina	Paraguay	1–2	1–5	2006 South American Women's Football Championship
2	17 November 2006	Estadio José María Minella, Mar del Plata, Argentina	Brazil	1–4	1–6	2006 South American Women's Football Championship
3	18 September 2014	Estadio Alejandro Serrano Aguilar, Cuenca, Ecuador	Paraguay	1–2	2–10	2014 Copa América Femenina
4	18 September 2014	Estadio Alejandro Serrano Aguilar, Cuenca, Ecuador	Paraguay	2–8	2–10	2014 Copa América Femenina
5	11 April 2018	Estadio Municipal Francisco Sánchez Rumoroso, Coquimbo, Chile	Ecuador	1–0	1–0	2018 Copa América Femenina
