= Renata Costa =

Brazilian footballer

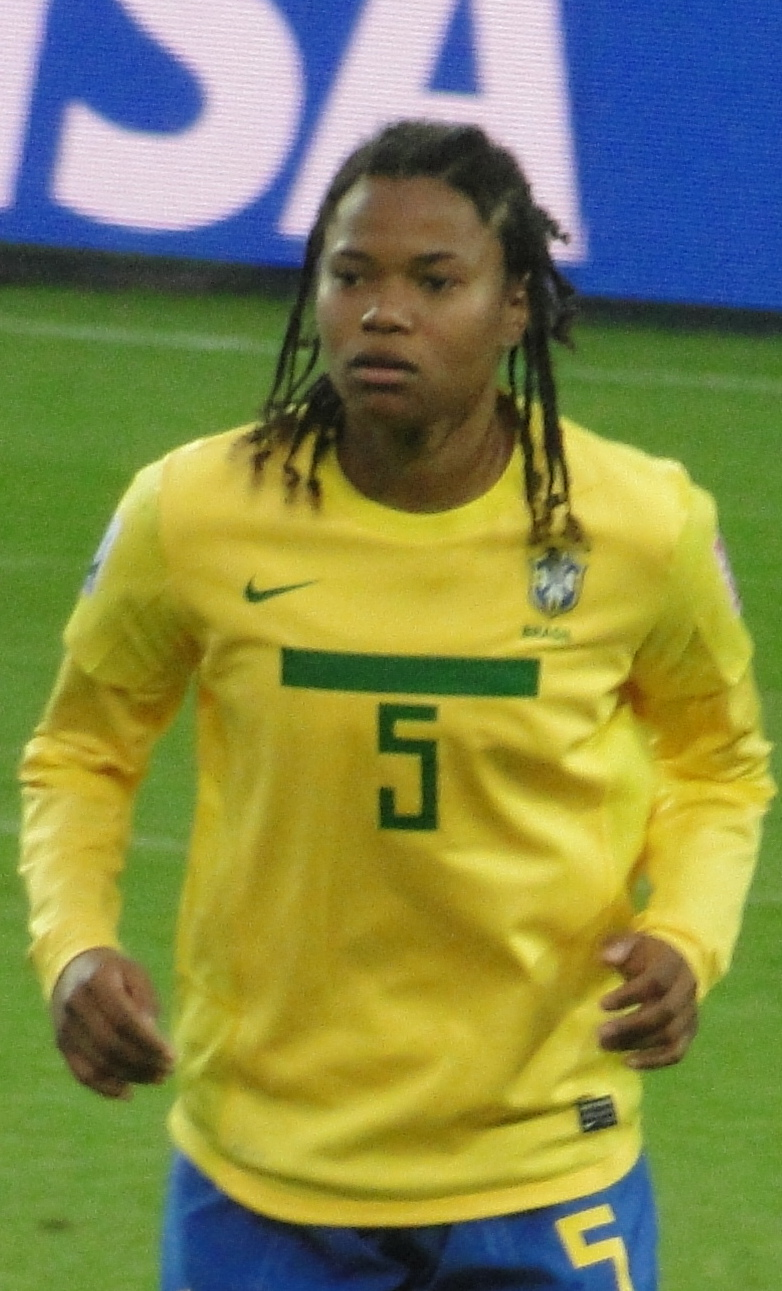
- Renata Costa in 2011

Personal information
- Full name: Renata Aparecida da Costa
- Date of birth: 8 July 1986 (age 40)
- Place of birth: Assaí, Paraná, Brazil
- Height: 1.71 m (5 ft 7 in)
- Positions: Defender; midfielder

Senior career*
Years	Team	Apps	(Gls)
- Grêmio Maringá
- Portuguesa Londrinense
- Marília
2004	Santos		
2005–2007	Botucatu		
2008	OB Odense		
2009	LdB FC Malmö	20	(6)
2010	Santos		
2011–2012	Foz Cataratas		
2013	Assaí		
2014–2015	Kubanochka Krasnodar	28	(2)
2016–2017	Corinthians		
2017–2019	Iranduba		

International career
2002–2004	Brazil U-19		
2003–2012	Brazil		
Medal record
Representing Brazil
Olympic Games – Women's Football
Silver medal – second place	2004 Athens	Team competition
Silver medal – second place	2008 Beijing	Team competition
Pan American Games
Gold medal – first place	2007 Rio de Janeiro	Team competition
Silver medal – second place	2011 Guadalajara	Team competition
- * Club domestic league appearances and goals

Renata Aparecida da Costa (born 8 July 1986), commonly known as Renata Costa or Kóki, is a Brazilian football coach and former player, most recently an assistant coach with Iranduba. She represented the Brazil women's national football team at three editions of the FIFA Women's World Cup (2003, 2007 and 2011) and three Olympic football tournaments (2004, 2008 and 2012).

== Career ==
She played as a creative midfielder for Brazil's Botucatu FC from 2005, and was a member of the Brazilian national teams that won the silver medal at the 2004 Summer Olympics and 2008 Summer Olympics. She is known for her precise passing and goal scoring prowess.

In January 2008, Costa signed for Danish Elitedivisionen club OB Odense. Her new coach described her as a strong midfielder with good technique who could score goals and also play in defence. It was reported that Costa's transfer was one of the first involving Brazilian female players to generate a profit for the selling club.

On 24 September 2008, Costa's American transfer rights were drafted by the Saint Louis Athletica in the 2008 WPS International Draft. Instead of joining the new American franchise, she accepted a competing offer from LdB FC Malmö of the Swedish Damallsvenskan. LdB FC took over the final year of Costa's Odense contract, paying an undisclosed transfer fee to the Danish club.

In January 2014, Russian Top Division club Kubanochka Krasnodar announced the triple signing of Costa and her compatriots Danielli and Amanda Brunner. The club reached the 2014 Russian Women's Cup final, but were beaten 5–0 by Ryazan-VDV. The Brazilian players were awarded new one-year contracts by Kubanochka in February 2015.

Upon her return to Brazil, Costa joined Corinthians, who had reformed in conjunction with Grêmio Osasco Audax Esporte Clube and were known as Corinthians Audax. After helping Corinthians Audax to win the 2016 Copa do Brasil de Futebol Feminino, she signed for ambitious Amazonas-based Iranduba in October 2017. Costa retired from playing following the 2019 season, but remained at the club as an assistant coach for a time before announcing her departure in June 2020.

Despite playing as a midfielder at club level, with Brazil she played as a sweeper, notably alongside centre-backs Tânia and Aline.

== Personal life ==
=== Car accident ===
In October 2007, Costa crashed her Opel Corsa into another car at a level crossing. She and the front seat passenger Michele suffered minor injuries. Another Botucatu teammate, 16-year-old Cátia Oliveira, was asleep in the back seat and suffered a spinal cord injury, resulting in paraplegia. Costa was fined $576 for driving without a licence. Cátia, who had been called up to the Brazil women's national under-17 football team on the day of the accident, later trained as a para table tennis player and represented Brazil at the 2016 Rio Paralympics.
