= Eva González (Argentine footballer) =

Argentine footballer (born 1987)

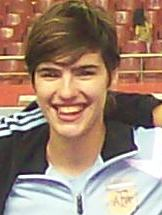
- González in 2006

Personal information
- Full name: Eva Nadia González
- Date of birth: 2 September 1987 (age 39)
- Place of birth: Buenos Aires, Argentina
- Height: 5 ft 9 in (1.75 m)
- Position: Centre-back

Senior career*
Years	Team	Apps	(Gls)
- Boca Juniors

International career^{‡}
- Argentina
- * Club domestic league appearances and goals ‡ National team caps and goals as of 14:05, 6 April 2012 (UTC)

Eva Nadia González (born 2 September 1987) is an Argentine former footballer who played as a centre-back. She served the Boca Juniors for most of her club career and was captain of Argentina.

== International career ==
In November 2006, González scored the opening goal in the final of the 2006 South American Women's Football Championship, which ended in a shock 2–0 win for Argentina against regional rivals Brazil. She locked out Brazilian stars Elaine and Cristiane to win the Albiceleste their first-ever South American title and earn a direct qualification spot for both the 2007 FIFA Women's World Cup and the 2008 Beijing Olympics.

At the World Cup in China, González had an eventful match against England. As captain, she scored England's first goal by misdirecting a header past her own goalkeeper and then scored a curling free kick at the other end. Argentina lost 6–1 and exited the tournament from the group stage after losing their other two matches: 11–0 to Germany and 1–0 to Japan.
