= 1989 Italy rugby union tour of Argentina =

Summary
P	W	D	L
Total
6	4	0	2
Test match
1	0	0	1
Opponent
P	W	D	L
Argentina
1	1	0	0

The 1989 Italy rugby union tour of Argentina was a series of matches played in June 1989 in Argentina by the Italy national rugby union team.

The tour went well for Italy, following several prior years of poor results. Italy won the first four matches and lost only against Cordoba (led by Diego Dominguez, the future fly half of Italy) and the "Pumas".

== Results ==
Scores and results list Italy's points tally first.

Opposing Team	For	Against	Date	Venue	Status
Mar del Plata	26	9	8 June 1989	Estadio José María Minella, Mar del Plata	Tour match
Cuyo	37	22	11 June 1989	Independiente Rivadavia Stadium, Mendoza	Tour match
Rosario	27	23	14 June 1989	Plaza Jewell, Rosario	Tour match
Prov. Argentinas	28	24	17 June 1989	Gimnasia y Tiro Stadium, Salta	Tour match
Córdoba	22	30	20 June 1989	C.A. Belgrano Stadium, Córdoba	Tour match
Argentina	16	21	24 June 1989	José Amalfitani Stadium, Buenos Aires	Test match

== Bibliography ==
- (in Italian) Valerio Vecchiarelli, Francesco Volpe, 2000, Italia in meta, GS editore, 2000.
- Vivian Jenkins, ed. (1989). Rothmans Rugby Yearbook 1989–90. Rothmans Publications Ltd. p. 65. ISBN 0-907574-05-X.
- (in Spanish) Memorias de la UAR 1989
