= Analía Almeida =

Argentine footballer

Personal information
- Full name: Analía Soledad Almeida
- Date of birth: 19 August 1985 (age 41)
- Place of birth: Jovita, Córdoba, Argentina
- Position: Forward

Senior career*
| Years | Team | Apps | (Gls) |
| 2008 | San Lorenzo de Almagro | | |

International career
| 2007–2010 | Argentina | 0 (?) | (0) |
- * Club domestic league appearances and goals

Analía Soledad Almeida (born 19 August 1985) is a former female Argentine football forward.

== Playing career ==
She was part of the Argentina women's national football team at the 2008 Summer Olympics. On club level she played for San Lorenzo de Almagro.

== See also ==
- Argentina at the 2008 Summer Olympics
