= Mabel Velarde =

Ecuadorian footballer (born 1988)

Personal information
- Full name: Mabel Velarde Coba
- Date of birth: 4 December 1988 (age 37)
- Place of birth: Quito, Ecuador
- Height: 1.58 m (5 ft 2 in)
- Position: Midfielder

Team information
- Current team: Quito FC

College career
| Years | Team | Apps | (Gls) |
| 2007 | Lee Flames | | |
| 2008–2009 | Southeast Missouri State Redhawks | | |

Senior career*
| Years | Team | Apps | (Gls) |
| 2006–2013 | Pichincha selection | | |
| 2013–2015 | Espuce | | |
| 2015– | Quito FC | | |

International career^{‡}
| 2006–2015 | Ecuador | 15 | (0) |
- * Club domestic league appearances and goals as of 12:59, 22 June 2015 (UTC) ‡ National team caps and goals as of 17:36, 17 June 2015 (UTC)

Mabel Velarde (born 4 December 1988) is an Ecuadorian professional footballer who plays for Quito FC. She was part of the Ecuadorian squad for the 2015 FIFA Women's World Cup.
