= Jovita, Argentina =

Coordinates: 34°30′S 63°56′W

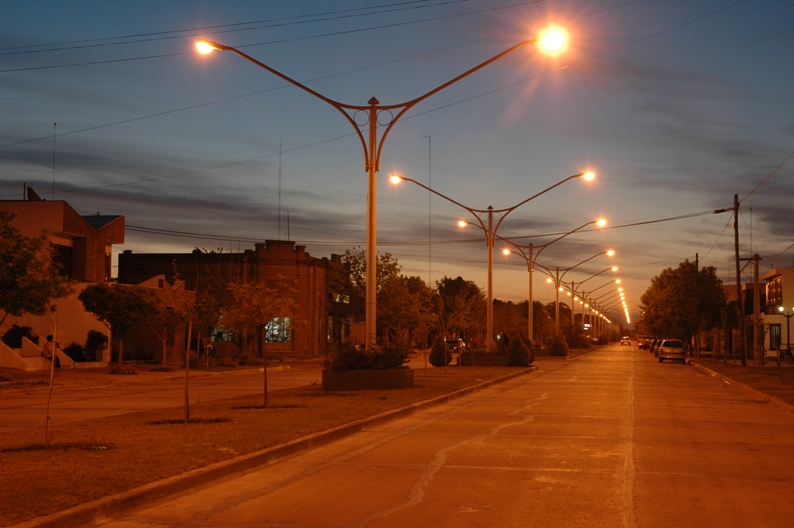
Jovita

Jovita is a town in the southern part of the Province of Córdoba, in central Argentina. According to the 2010 census, Jovita has a population of 4,470.

== Economy ==
Located in the centre of the Pampa Húmeda region or Pampa's Plain, the economy of Jovita is heavily reliant on cattle farming and agriculture, particularly soy beans, sunflower oil, corn and wheat.

In 2018, authorities from Jovita decided to ban fishing of silverside in a section of La Margarita lagoon.

== History ==
Jovita was founded in 1905 while the surveying plans were made and approved on May 15, 1907, and October 28, 1907. The land on which the town is built was donated by two sisters: Magdalena and Jovita from whom the town now takes its name.

Jovita's original name was Pichi Tromen, "El Juncalito" Station. It was not until 1906 when its name was changed to Santa Magdalena, Jovita Station, a name that was retained until 1983, when according to resolution 322/83, it was changed again to the current name of Jovita.

== Geographic situation ==
Jovita is located in Pedanía Italó of General Roca Department, Province of Córdoba, in Argentina.

Situated at an altitude of 153,5m above sea level, latitude 34°31' south, longitude 64°56'40" west. Ubicada en la nueva línea de frontera entre los fortines conocidos como Orma y Ortega.

The town is 592 km from Buenos Aires and 425 km from Córdoba, capital of the province with the same name. In this neighborhood one can also find the Río Quinto (lately named by the aborigines as Popopis at just 5 km).

In November 2023, the province began road improvement works on Route 27 between Jovita and Mattaldi.

== Current government ==
Mayor: Javier Alberto Riveri

== Educational institutions ==
Kindergartens Domingo Faustino Sarmiento Otilia Fernández de Tovagliari

Primary Schools Domingo Faustino Sarmiento Otilia Fernández de Tovagliari CENPA (Centro de Enseñanza Primaria de Adultos)

Secondary Schools IEMJO (Instituto de Educación Media con orientación en Gestión de las Organizaciones) IPEM 221 (Instituto de Educación Media con orientación Agropecuaria) CENMA (Centro de Educación Media para adultos)

Tertiary Schools Instituto de Formación Docente Martha Salotti

Special Schools ALAS (for persons with special capacities)
