= Mônica (footballer, born 1978) =

Brazilian footballer

Personal information
- Full name: Mônica Angélica de Paula
- Date of birth: 4 April 1978 (age 48)
- Place of birth: São Carlos, Brazil
- Height: 1.81 m (5 ft 11 in)
- Position: Defender

Senior career*
Years	Team	Apps	(Gls)
2000	São Paulo		
2001–2003	Matonense		
2004–2006	Ferroviária		
- Botucatu

International career^{‡}
2000–2007	Brazil		
- * Club domestic league appearances and goals as of 17:50, 2 January 2023 (UTC) ‡ National team caps and goals as of 17:50, 2 January 2023 (UTC)

Olympic medal record

Representing Brazil

Olympic Games - Women's Football
Silver medal – second place	2004 Athens	Team

Pan American Games - Women's Football
Gold medal – first place	2003 Santo Domingo	Team competition

Mônica Angélica de Paula (born 4 April 1978), or simply Mônica, is a Brazilian retired footballer who played as a defender. She was a member of the Brazilian National Team that won the silver medal at the 2004 Summer Olympics.

Born in São Paulo, Mônica only began playing football in 1999. Before, she used to practice basketball — even played with Adrianinha and Kelly of the basketball national team — and volleyball, which she abandoned after a pregnancy. In her pro career, she also played for São Paulo, Matonense and Araraquara.

At the training camp for the 2000 Summer Olympics, Mônica fought with teammate Daniela. The confrontation was attributed to premenstrual syndrome.
