= Florencia Romano =

Argentine former football referee

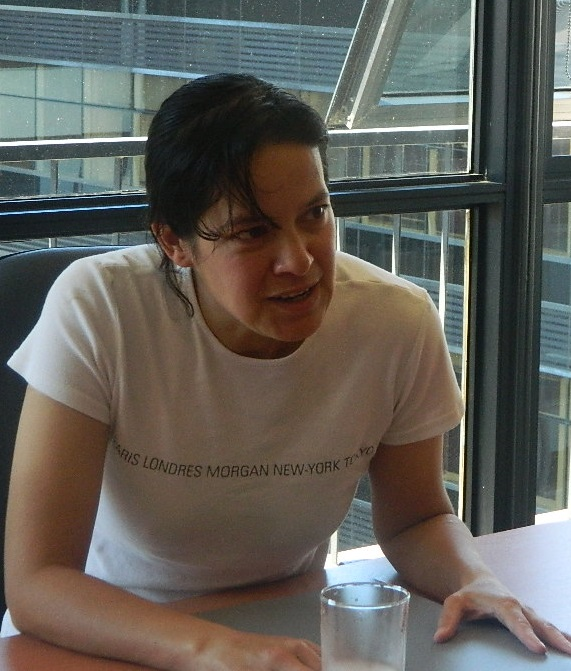

Florencia Raquel Romano is an Argentine former football referee.
