= Tânia Maranhão =

Brazilian footballer

Olympic medal record

Representing Brazil

Olympic Games - Women's Football
Silver medal – second place	2004 Athens	Team competition
Silver medal – second place	2008 Beijing	Team competition

Pan American Games - Women's Football
Gold medal – first place	2007 Rio de Janeiro	Team competition
Gold medal – first place	2003 Santo Domingo	Team competition
Silver medal – second place	2011 Guadalajara	Team competition

Tânia Maria Pereira Ribeiro (born 10 March 1974), commonly known as Tânia Maria, Tânia Maranhão or simply Tânia, is a Brazilian former footballer. She played as a defender for Brazil's Saad EC, and is a member of the Brazilian National Team, for which she won a silver medal at the 2004 and 2008 Summer Olympics. She started on futsal team Eurosport, and also played for Bahia, Santa Isabel and Rayo Vallecano. In 1997 Tânia was playing for São Paulo FC.

She was born in São Luís, Maranhão.
