= Aline (footballer, born 1982) =

Brazilian footballer

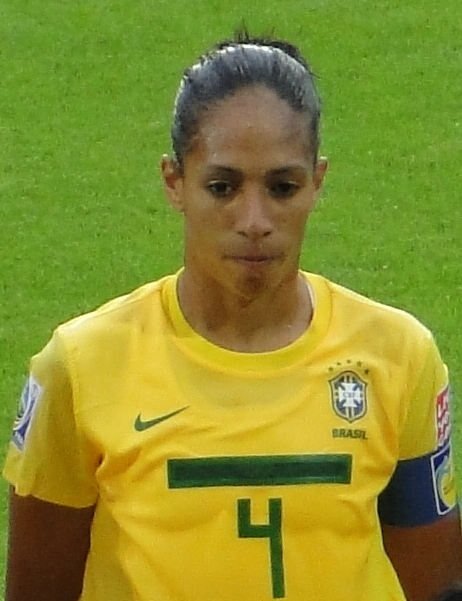

Personal information
- Full name: Aline Pellegrino
- Date of birth: July 6, 1982 (age 44)
- Place of birth: São Paulo, Brazil
- Height: 1.80 m (5 ft 11 in)
- Position: Defender

Youth career
- 1994–1997: Horto Florestal

Senior career*
Years	Team	Apps	(Gls)
1997–1999	São Paulo		
1999–2000	Juventus		
2000–2008	UniSant'anna		
2008–2011	Santos		(27)
2011–2012	WFC Rossiyanka		
2013	Novo Mundo		

International career
2004–2012	Brazil		

Managerial career
- 2013: Vitória das Tabocas
- * Club domestic league appearances and goals

Aline Pellegrino (born July 6, 1982), commonly known as Aline, is a Brazilian former footballer who played as a defender for Russian club WFC Rossiyanka and several clubs in her native Brazil. She was a member of the Brazil national team that won the silver medal at the 2004 Summer Olympics and competed at the 2007 FIFA Women's World Cup, where Brazil became the runners-up. She was made captain of the national team in 2006.

In August 2011, she joined Russian Champions League contestant WFC Rossiyanka.

== International career ==
Aline missed the 2008 Beijing Olympics after suffering a knee ligament injury in a pre-tournament friendly against South Korea. She had helped to secure Brazil's place at the tournament, by scoring in a 5–1 win over Ghana at a CONMEBOL–CAF play-off staged at Beijing's Workers Stadium. Brazil had been forced into the play-off following a shock defeat at the hands of Argentina at the 2006 South American Women's Football Championship.

=== International goals ===
No	Date	Venue	Opponent	Score	Result	Competition
1.	11 November 2006	Estadio José María Minella, Mar del Plata, Argentina	Paraguay	1-4	1-4	2006 South American Women's Football Championship
2.	19 April 2008	Workers Stadium, Beijing, China	Ghana	3–0	5–1	Inter-continental play-off
3.	20 December 2009	Estádio do Pacaembu, São Paulo, Brazil	Mexico	1–1	5–2	2009 Torneio Internacional Cidade de São Paulo de Futebol Feminino
4.	5 November 2010	Estadio Federativo Reina del Cisne, Loja, Ecuador	Venezuela	1–0	4–0	2010 South American Women's Football Championship
5.	5 November 2010	Estadio Federativo Reina del Cisne, Loja, Ecuador	Venezuela	2–0	4–0	2010 South American Women's Football Championship
6.	14 May 2011	Estádio Rei Pelé, Maceio, Brazil	Chile	1–0	3–0	Friendly match
7.	8 December 2011	Estádio do Pacaembu, São Paulo, Brazil	Italy	5–1	5–1	2011 Torneio Internacional Cidade de São Paulo de Futebol Feminino

== Guerreiras Project ==
In 2010 Aline and Caitlin Fisher founded the Guerreiras (transl. female warrior) Project, to counter sexism in women's football in Brazil.
