= Cristiane (footballer) =

Brazilian footballer (born 1985)

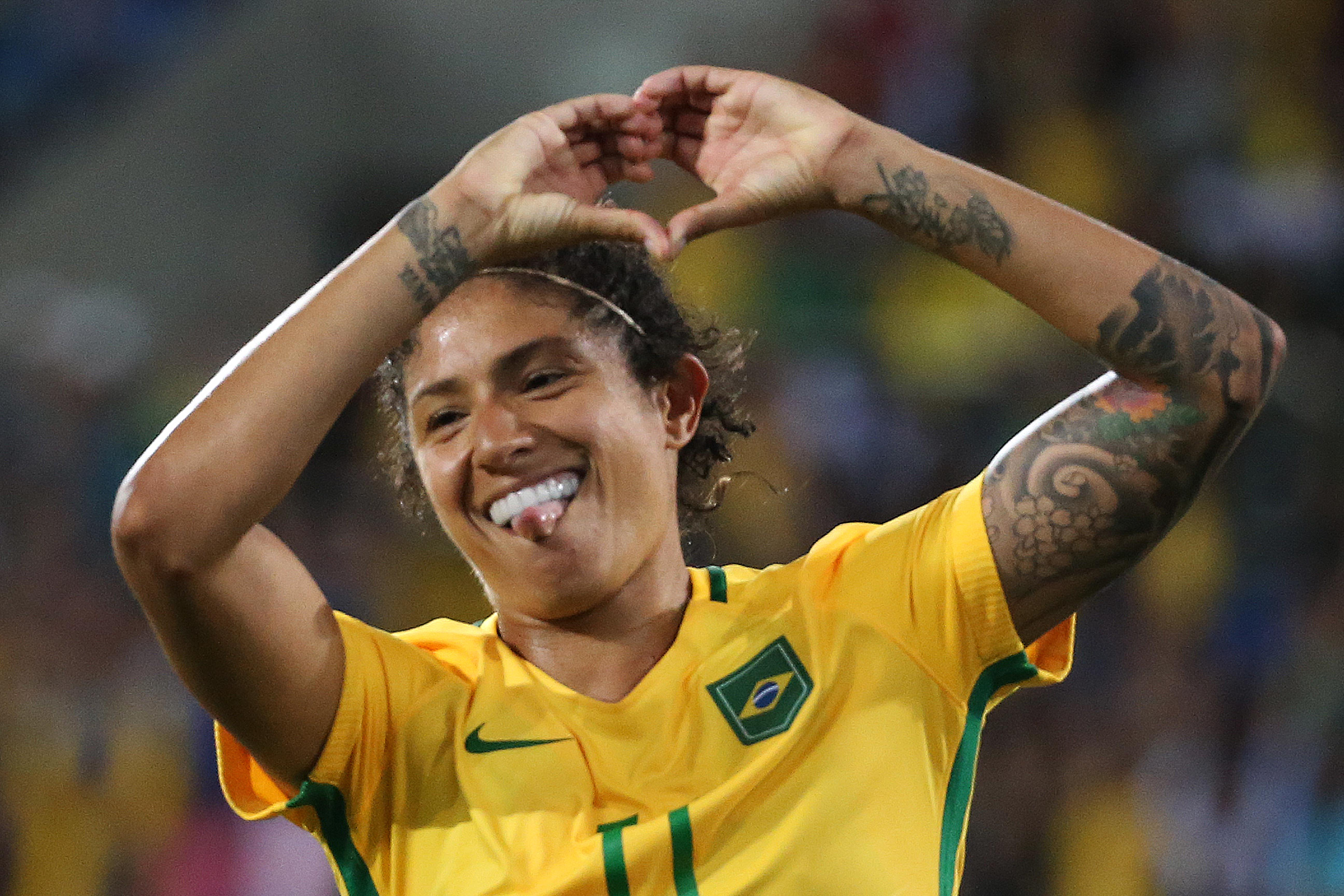
- Cristiane at the 2016 Olympics

Personal information
- Full name: Cristiane Rozeira de Souza Silva
- Date of birth: 15 May 1985 (age 41)
- Place of birth: Osasco, Brazil
- Height: 1.70 m (5 ft 7 in)
- Position: Forward

Team information
- Current team: Flamengo
- Number: 11

Youth career
- São Bernardo

Senior career*
Years	Team	Apps	(Gls)
2003–2005	Juventus-SP		
2005–2006	1. FFC Turbine Potsdam	30	(17)
2006–2007	VfL Wolfsburg	20	(7)
2008	Linköpings FC	14	(6)
2008	Corinthians		
2009	Chicago Red Stars		
2009	Santos		
2010	Chicago Red Stars		
2011	Santos		
2011–2012	Rossiyanka	10	(10)
2012	São José-SP		
2013	Icheon Daekyo		
2013–2015	Centro Olímpico	13	(15)
2015–2017	Paris Saint-Germain	36	(26)
2017–2019	Changchun Zhuoyue	12	(5)
2019	São Paulo	9	(3)
2020–2023	Santos	55	(29)
2024–	Flamengo	30	(20)

International career^{‡}
2002–2004	Brazil U19		
2003–	Brazil	157	(97)
Medal record
Women's football
Representing Brazil
FIFA Women's World Cup
Silver medal – second place	2007 China	Team
Olympic Games
Silver medal – second place	2004 Athens	Team
Silver medal – second place	2008 Beijing	Team
Pan American Games
Gold medal – first place	2007 Rio de Janeiro	Team
Gold medal – first place	2015 Toronto	Team
- * Club domestic league appearances and goals as of 21:03, 15 November 2025 (UTC) ‡ National team caps and goals as of 21:03, 15 November 2025 (UTC)

Cristiane Rozeira de Souza Silva (born 15 May 1985), known as Cristiane ([kɾisˈtʃjɐni]), is a Brazilian footballer who plays for Flamengo and the Brazilian women's national team. A prolific forward, she was part of Brazil's silver medal-winning teams at the 2004 and 2008 Olympic football tournaments. In total she has participated in five FIFA Women's World Cups and four Olympics.

At club level, Cristiane has played professionally in France, Germany, Sweden, the United States, Russia and South Korea, as well as in her native Brazil.

== Career ==
=== Early beginnings ===
Cristiane started her career at the local football clubs São Bernardo (in São Bernardo do Campo) and Clube Atlético Juventus (in São Paulo). At the age of 15, she debuted for the Brazil Under-19 team and took part in both the 2002 U-19 Women's World Championship in Canada and the 2004 U-19 Women's World Championship in Thailand; Brazil finished fourth in both tournaments. In 2003, Cristiane scored one goal during one appearance as a substitute, when Brazil successfully defended their title at the Sudamericano Femenino. She was also part of the squad for the 2003 Women's World Cup, appearing as a substitute in all four of Brazil's matches.

=== Breakthrough ===
Cristiane had her international breakthrough at the Olympic football tournament in Athens 2004. Brazil reached the final, which they lost to the United States, but still achieved their biggest international success until then, by winning the Olympic silver medal. With five goals, Cristiane was honored as the tournament's top scorer along with Germany's Birgit Prinz.

In February 2005, Cristiane transferred from Atlético Juventus to the German women's Bundesliga club 1. FFC Turbine Potsdam. During the 2005–06 season she won the Bundesliga title and the German cup competition with Potsdam, although she was often used as a substitute and had difficulties to adjust to the physical play in Germany. In the following season she was transferred to the league rival VfL Wolfsburg, where she scored seven goals during the 2006–07 season, but her problems to adapt to the style of play in Germany continued. In August 2007, Cristiane did not renew her contract in Wolfsburg and returned to Brazil to support the newly created Brazilian cup competition, the Copa do Brasil de Futebol Feminino.

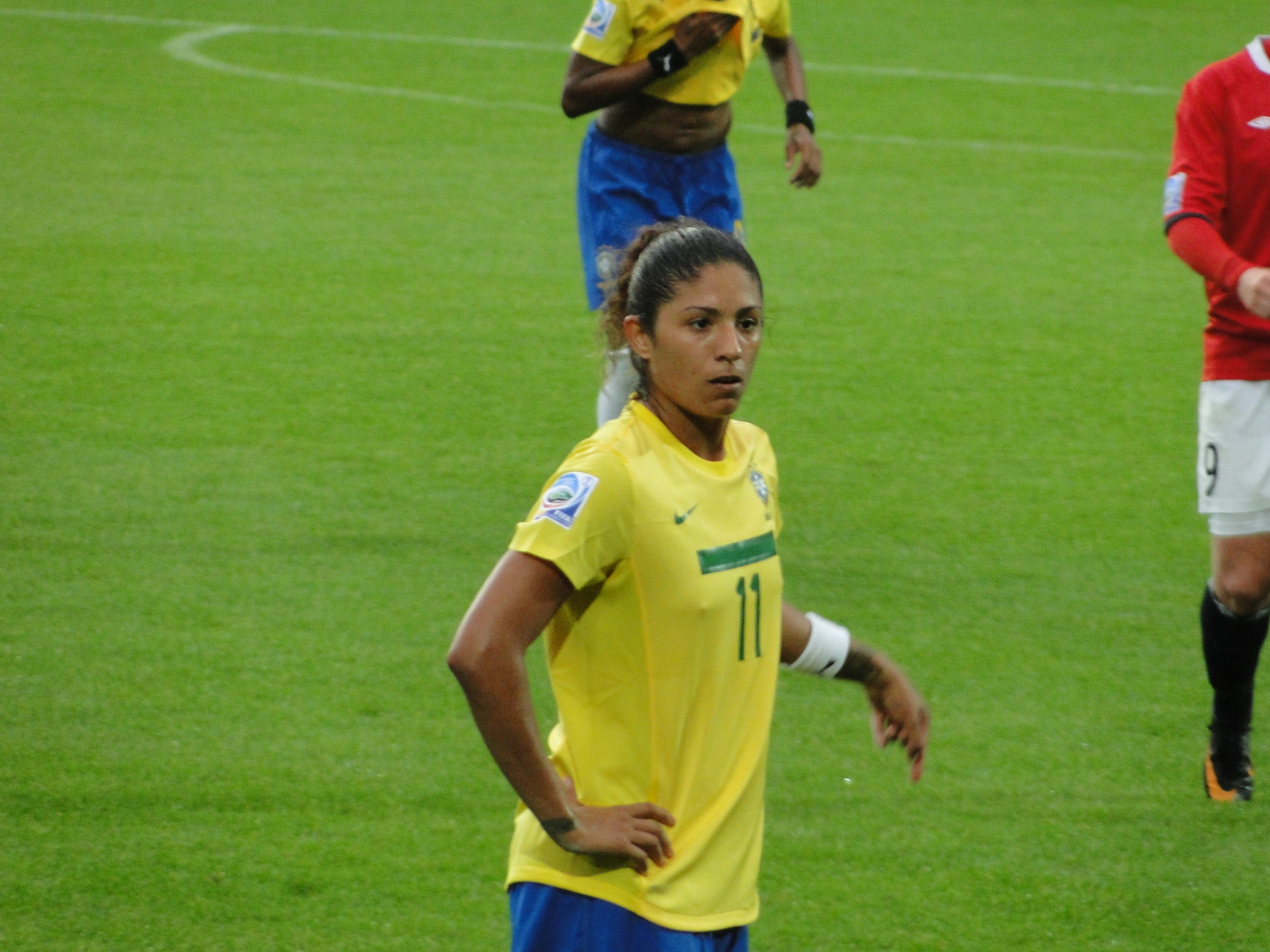
Cristiane during the 2011 FIFA Women's World Cup

Cristiane was the top scorer at the 2006 Sudamericano Femenino with 12 goals, even though Brazil competed with a weakened team and only finished second behind Argentina for the first time after four consecutive title defenses. In 2007, she scored eight goals at the Pan American Games, hosted by Brazil. In the final, the Brazilian national team defeated the United States Under-20 squad before a crowd of 68,000 at the Maracanã Stadium in Rio de Janeiro.

At the 2007 Women's World Cup Cristiane was voted the third-best player of the tournament. She scored five goals and she was the second best scorer of her team next to her strike partner, Marta. She was involved in a collision that resulted in a controversial red card for Shannon Boxx of the United States in the semifinal. Brazil reached the Women's World Cup final for the first time which they lost to defending champions Germany. Cristiane came in third for the 2007 FIFA World Player of the Year award.

In February 2008, she signed a five-month contract until the Summer Olympics with the Swedish Damallsvenskan club Linköpings FC.

On 21 August 2008 at the Beijing Olympics, Cristiane was substituted in what looked like a repeat of the 2004 Olympics Women's Football final in that Brazil once again lost to the USA team in the final to end up with the silver. The match ended 1–0 after extra time. For the second straight Olympics, she scored 5 goals and was the tournament's leading scorer; unlike the 2004 tournament, Cristiane was the outright leading scorer.

On 28 August 2008, Cristiane joined Corinthians to play in Campeonato Paulista. On 30 August 2008, during her debut as a Corinthians player, she scored her first goal for the club, helping her team beat São José 3–1 in the Campeonato Paulista.

=== To the United States ===
On 24 September 2008, the Women's Professional Soccer (WPS) rights to Cristiane were acquired by the Chicago Red Stars at the inaugural International Draft. Cristiane completed her move to the Red Stars on 27 February 2009. On 12 July 2009, Cristiane scored the first hat-trick in WPS history, leading the Chicago Red Stars to a 3–1 victory against FC Gold Pride. She finished as the team top scorer with seven goals and was named to the league All-Star team.

She returned to Chicago for the 2010 season, but showed less impressive form and was made a free agent after only scoring three goals in 24 appearances. Chicago Red Stars suspended operations shortly afterwards and Cristiane decided to play the 2011 season in Brazil.

=== 2009–present ===
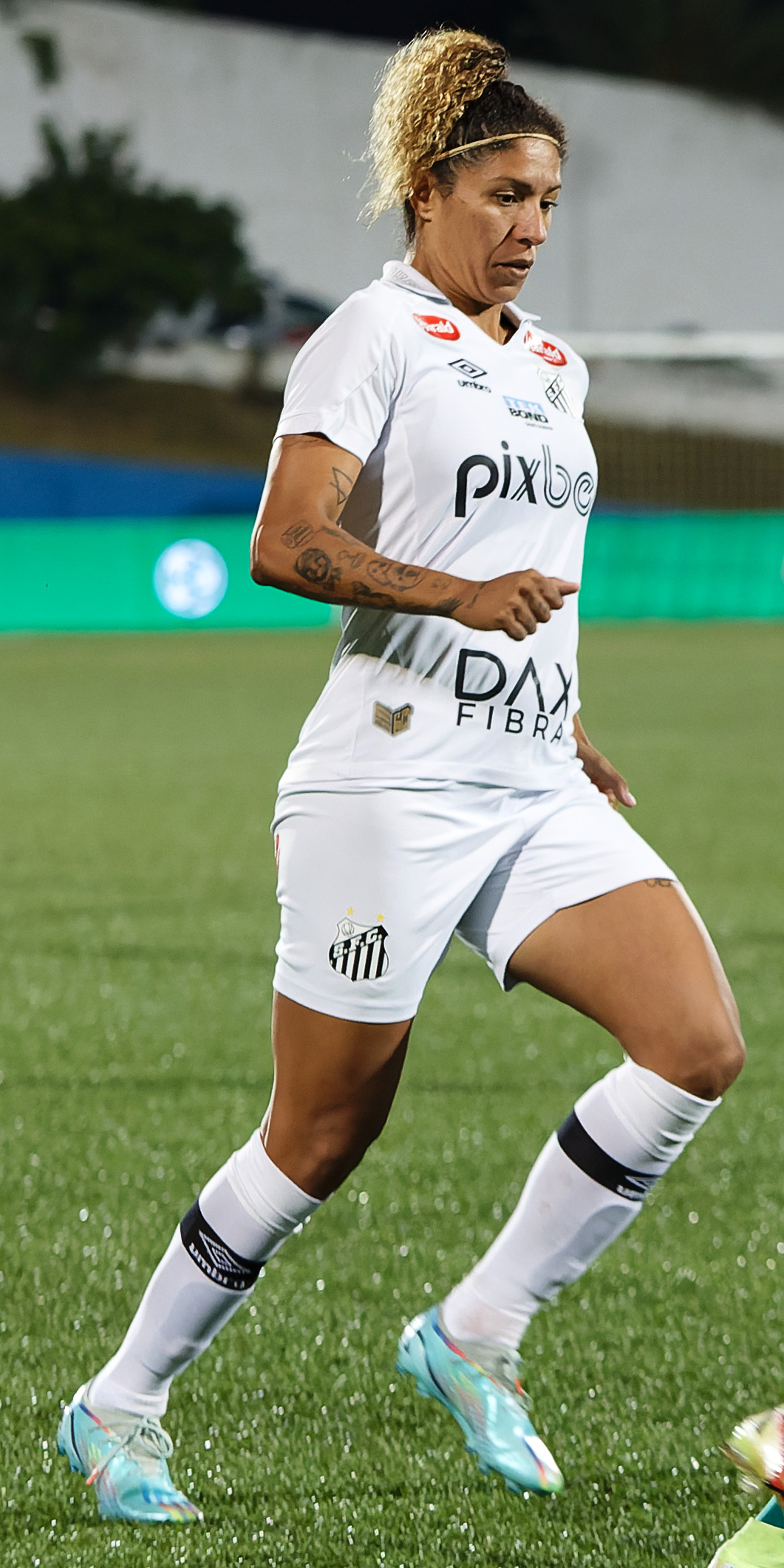
Cristiane with Santos in 2022

Cristiane signed a three-month loan contract with Santos on 14 August 2009 to play in the Copa Libertadores. She helped her club win both competitions, and scored a goal in the Copa do Brasil final.

In September 2011, she joined Russian Champions League contestant WFC Rossiyanka. A year later she moved to São José Esporte Clube of São José dos Campos, Brazil. Early in 2013 it was announced that Cristiane would join the Icheon Daekyo WFC (Daekyo Kangaroos) in South Korea's WK-League. She quit South Korea shortly afterwards, in order to join Centro Olímpico in Brazil.

In August 2015 Cristiane and compatriot Érika made a double transfer to French UEFA Women's Champions League contenders Paris Saint-Germain Féminines. Paris coach Farid Benstiti already knew Cristiane, having been her boss at Rossiyanka.

In July 2017, Cristiane joined Changchun Zhuoyue on a transfer from Paris Saint-Germain Féminines.

In October 2017, Cristiane was one of five Brazil players to quit international football, disgruntled at pay and conditions, and the Brazilian Football Confederation's sacking of head coach Emily Lima. She soon relented and indicated a willingness to return to the national team in February 2018, ahead of the 2018 Copa América Femenina.

On 16 January 2020, after a one-year spell at São Paulo, Cristiane returned to Santos. On 10 December 2022, she renewed her contract until the end of 2024.

On 13 January 2024, Cristiane rescinded her contract with Santos, and was announced at Flamengo the following day.

== Personal life ==
Cristiane is lesbian, and has been in a relationship with Ana Paula Garcia Silva, a lawyer, since February 2019. On 15 August 2020, the two married in São Paulo, Brazil. Her son Bento was born on 26 April 2021.

== Career statistics ==
=== International ===
As of 15 November 2025

Brazil
Year	Apps	Goals
2003	14	3
2004	7	5
2006	7	12
2007	14	14
2008	7	7
2009	6	4
2010	9	12
2011	9	3
2012	10	3
2013	5	1
2014	17	9
2015	14	8
2016	10	4
2017	3	1
2018	7	4
2019	6	6
2020	3	0
2021	3	0
2023	2	0
2024	4	1
Total	157	97

== Honours ==
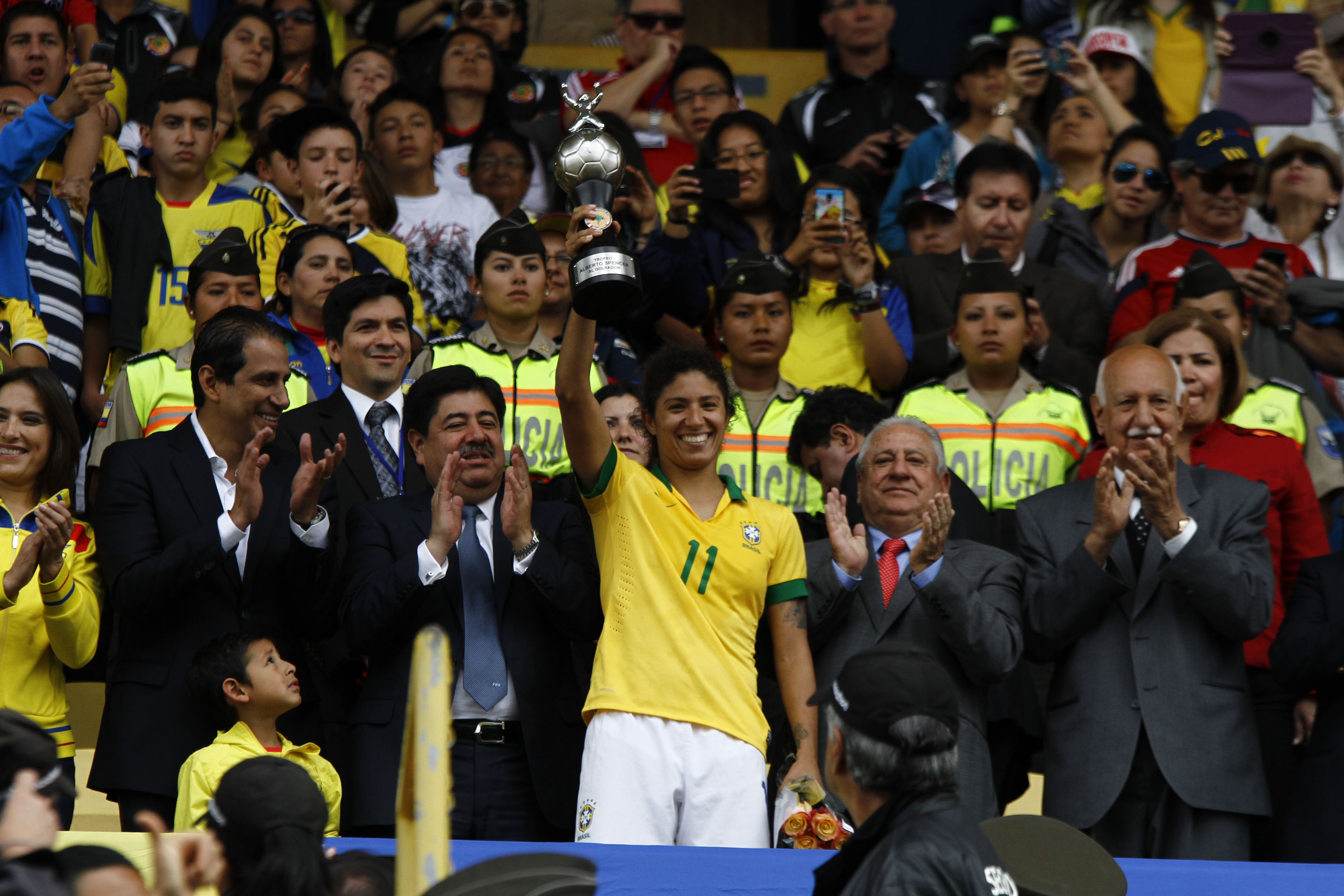
Cristiane lifting the 2014 Copa America top scorer trophy

Santos

- Copa Libertadores: 2009
- Copa do Brasil: 2009
- Copa Paulista: 2020

1. FFC Turbine Potsdam

- UEFA Women's Cup: 2004–05
- Bundesliga: 2005–06

São Paulo

- Campeonato Brasileiro de Futebol Feminino Série A2: 2019

Brazil

- FIFA Women's World Cup runner-up: 2007
- Pan American Games: 2007, 2015
- Summer Olympics Silver Medal: 2004, 2008
- Sudamericano Femenino: 2003
- Copa América Femenina: 2014

Individual

- Copa América Femenina Top Scorer: 2014 (6 goals)
- FIFA World Player of the Year Third place award: 2007, 2008
- Third-best player at the FIFA Women's World Cup Bronze Ball : 2007
- Copa Libertadores Femenina Top Scorer: 2009, 2012
- Sudamericano Femenino Top Scorer: 2006
- Summer Olympics Top scorer: 2004, 2008
- FIFA Women's World Cup Goal of the Tournament: 2019
- IFFHS CONMEBOL Woman Team of the Decade 2011–2020
- Summer Olympics All-time Top Scorer: 14 goals
- Has scored 2 hat tricks in Olympic play, including the fastest in Olympic history. Cristiane, Barbra Banda, Birgit Prinz and Christine Sinclair are the only four women to have ever scored a hat trick in the Olympics.

== See also ==
- List of FIFA Women's World Cup hat-tricks
- List of women's footballers with 100 or more international caps
