= Michele (footballer) =

Brazilian footballer

Personal information
- Full name: Michele Aparecida Pereira Reis
- Date of birth: 10 June 1984 (age 42)
- Place of birth: Limeira, Brazil
- Height: 1.65 m (5 ft 5 in)
- Positions: Left back; midfielder

Senior career*
Years	Team	Apps	(Gls)
- Botucatu FC
2012–2014	Vasco da Gama		
2014	Botafogo		
2015–2018	Flamengo		

International career
2002	Brazil U-19		
2003–2007	Brazil		
- * Club domestic league appearances and goals

Michele Aparecida Pereira Reis (born 10 June 1984), or simply Michele, is a Brazilian retired footballer who played as either a left back or a midfielder.

Michele played for Brazil at the 2002 FIFA U-20 Women's World Championship.
