= Estadio José María Minella =

Football stadium in Mar del Plata, Argentina

José María Minella Stadium
- Estadio José María Minella
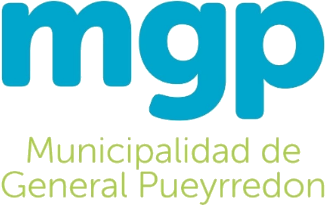

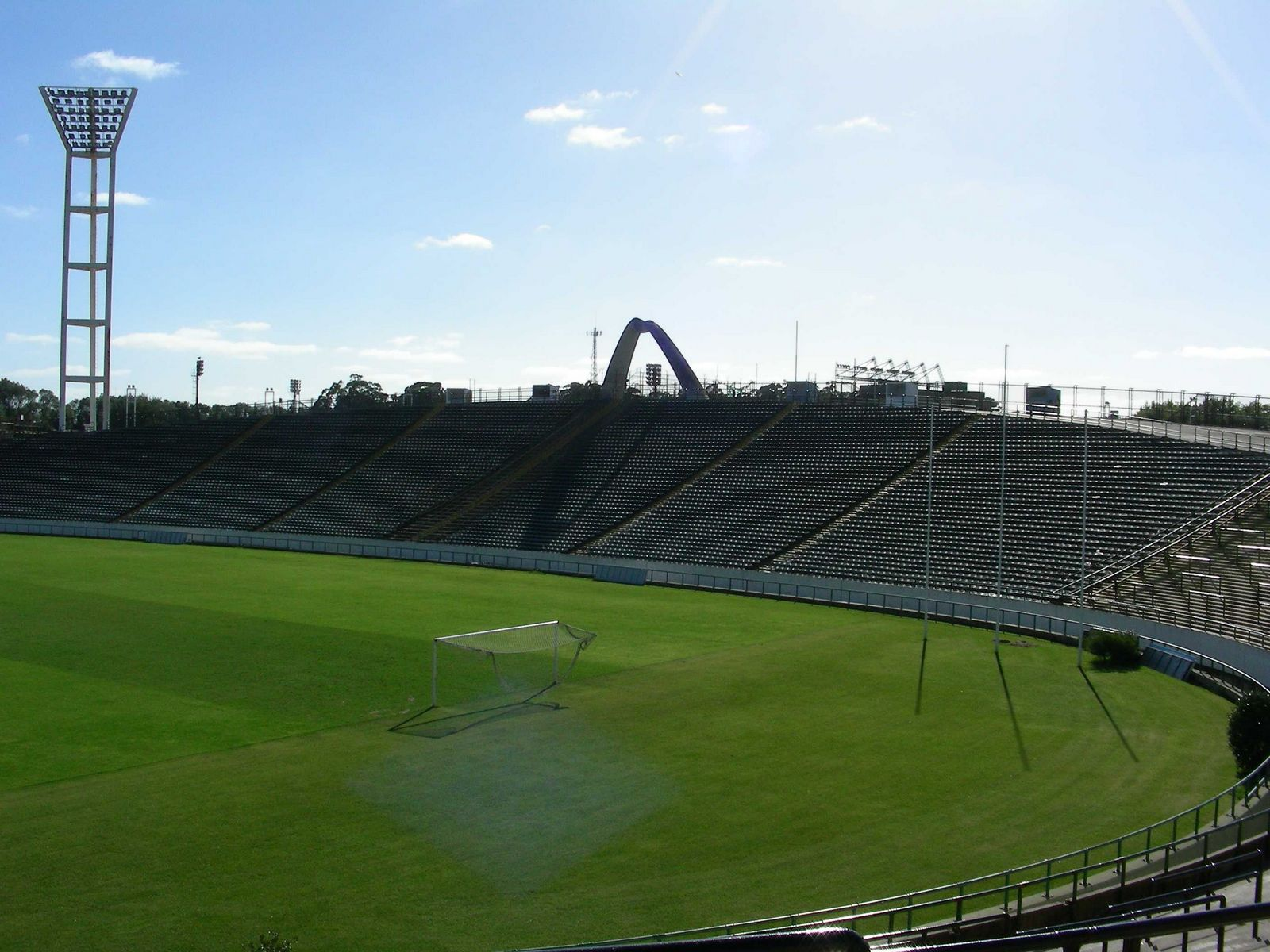
- View of the stadium in 2008
- Interactive map of José María Minella Stadium
- Full name: Estadio José María Minella
- Address: Av. de las Olimpíadas 760; Mar del Plata; Argentina
- Coordinates: 38°01′05″S 57°34′56″W
- Owner: General Pueyrredón Partido
- Operator: Minella Stadium S.A.
- Capacity: 35,180
- Surface: Grass
- Field size: 105 x 70 m
- Current use: Football

Construction
- Built: 1975–78
- Opened: May 21, 1978; 48 years ago
- Architects: Antonini Schon Zemborain & Asoc.

Tenants
- C.A. Aldosivi; C.A. Alvarado; Torneos de Verano (1979–2019); Argentina national football team (1982–2011); 1995 Pan American Games (football); 1999 Sudamericano Sub20; 2001 FIFA u20 World Cup; 2006 Sudamericano de Fútbol Femenino; Argentina national rugby team (2008–10); Mar del Plata RU team

Website
- mardelplata.gob.ar/estadiominella

The Estadio José María Minella is a stadium in the city of Mar del Plata, Argentina. Owned by the Municipality of General Pueyrredón, the venue is administered by Minella Stadium S.A. since August 2025. Inaugurated for the 1978 FIFA World Cup hosted by Argentina, the stadium is currently used by local clubs Alvarado and Aldosivi to play their home matches.

The stadium is named after renowned football player and manager José María Minella, a native of Mar del Plata and regarded as one of the most notable footballers of that city.

== History ==
Argentina was chosen as the host nation of the 1978 World Cup by FIFA in London, England on 6 July 1966, and Mar del Plata, as one of the most touristic cities in the country, was selected as a venue. The stadium has the distinction of being the southernmost stadium to host a World Cup match. The organizing committee, under supervision of the military dictatorship that ruled Argentina since 1976, decided to build a new stadium on the same spot where the Mar del Plata hippodrome had been located 40 years earlier. The construction began in 1975 and the stadium was opened on May 21, 1978, with a friendly match between a team formed by players from Mar del Plata and another one with players from Tandil.

The sports journalist Mario Trucco proposed the name to honour José María Minella, a renowned former midfielder from Mar del Plata, who played during the 1930s and 1940s for River Plate and the Argentina national football team, and later River Plate manager from 1945 to 1959 in what became one of the team's most successful eras.

During the 1978 World Cup Mar del Plata hosted six Fifa World Cup matches, three Group 1 and three Group 3 matches.

As the city of Mar del Plata is a very important tourist destination and the biggest seaside beach resort in Argentina, since its construction this stadium has been the main host of the many annual Summer Tournaments. Prior to the construction of Minella stadium, the main venue of the city had been General San Martín Stadium, with capacity for 15,000 spectators. That venue used to host matches of local teams San Lorenzo, Kimberley and Aldosivi.

In 1985 the stadium hosted the New Zealand rugby team that played at the stadium as part of their tour of Argentina. The national side beat Mar del Plata Rugby Union 56–6. The All Blacks would return in 1991, also playing vs the Mar del Plata Union, beating them 48–6.

On February 24, 1993, the stadium played host to the second, and final, Intercontinental Cup for Nations (known as the Artemio Franchi Trophy) between the then-defending South American football champions, Argentina, and reigning European champions, Denmark. The match ended 1–1 after extra time, but Argentina went on to win 5–4 on penalty shoot-out.

From March 12 to March 26, 1995, Mar del Plata hosted the 12th Pan American Games, and the José María Minella was venue for the opening and closing ceremonies, as well as the football tournament.

In 2015, local club Aldosivi was promoted to the Primera División and has since used this stadium for its home matches, along with Alvarado, currently playing in Torneo Federal A.

On September 24, 2021, a week before the return of the public to football stadiums after the COVID-19 pandemic, the Municipal Sports and Recreation Entity disabled the covered stalls (with a capacity for 6,500 seated people). The entity claimed structural flaws and ordered the closure of the sector until a detailed report on its situation was presented. As of 2023, the Estadio José Minella only hosts matches of local teams Aldosivi and Alvarado for competitions organised by AFA.

In February 2023, the Municipality of General Pueyrredón began to evaluate future possibilities for the stadium so it requested a report from the National University of Mar del Plata for a technical evaluation of the state of the roofed grandstand. But that commitment –which would be carried out by the best engineers in the city– had a cost of AR$13 million so it was discarded. Apart from the roof, the lighting towers and the parking lots were also severely deteriorated.

In 2025, the municipality of General Pueyrredón announced a call for bids in order to refurbish the deteriorated stadium, the "Islas Malvinas" sports complex, and other common places. In August 2025, it was announced that concession had been granted to "Minella Stadium S.A.", the only offeror company. The proposal included an investment of USD40 million. The concessionary also took a commitment to hold 30–35 events at the stadium, and 50–60 events at the sports centre. The Argentine Football Association (AFA) would also take part in the agreement, using the stadium as venue for the Argentina national team.

== Facilities ==
The José María Minella offers parking lots for 250 cars, a 590 m2 lounge and 245 m2 VIP area, conference room and two 550 m2 gyms. It is part of the "Teodoro Bronzini" Municipal Sports Park, a 35 hectares area with several sport venues, including the Polideportivo Islas Malvinas, the Julio Polet Municipal Velodrome, the Pan American Field Hockey Stadium, the "Alberto Zorrilla" Natatorium, the "Justo Roman" Athletic stadium and the Patinódromo Municipal.

== Sporting Events ==
The stadium was built for the 1978 FIFA World Cup and during June 1978 it hosted six matches, three Group 1 matches and three Group 3 matches.

=== 1978 FIFA World Cup ===
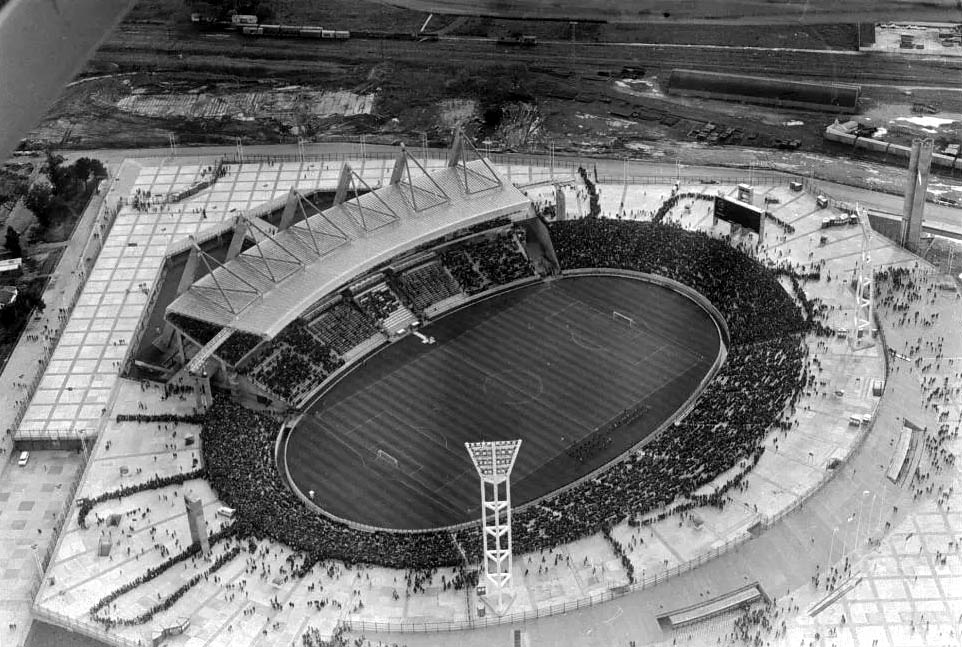
Aerial view of the stadium in 1978, when it was inaugurated to host the FIFA World Cup

Date	Time (UTC−03)	Group	Team #1	Res.	Team #2	Attendance
June 2	13:45 ART	Group 1	Italy	2–1	France	42,373
June 3	16:45 ART	Group 3	Brazil	1–1	Sweden	32,569
June 6	13:45 ART	Group 1	Italy	3–1	Hungary	26,533
June 7	13:45 ART	Group 3	Brazil	0–0	Spain	31,278
June 10	14:30 ART	Group 1	France	3–1	Hungary	23,127
June 11	13:45 ART	Group 3	Brazil	1–0	Austria	35,221

=== 2001 FIFA U-20 World Cup ===
The stadium hosted all the matches of Group F

Date	Group	Team #1	Res.	Team #2	Att.
18 June	Group F	Ghana	2–1	Paraguay	2,000
18 June	Group F	Iran	0–5	France	4,500
21 June	Group F	France	2–2	Paraguay	4,575
21 June	Group F	Iran	0–1	Ghana	4,500
24 June	Group F	Ghana	0–0	France	13,000
24 June	Group F	Paraguay	2–0	Iran	6,000
24 June	Round of 16	Ghana	1–0	Ecuador	11,000

=== Argentina national football team matches ===
Date	Event	Rival	Res.	Attendance
Mar 9, 1982	Friendly	Czechoslovakia	0–0	?
Feb 24, 1993	Artemio Franchi Trophy	Denmark	1–1 (5–4 p)	40,000
Dec 28, 1996	Friendly	FR Yugoslavia	2–3	19,600
Feb 24, 1998	Friendly	FR Yugoslavia	3–1	35,000
Feb 10, 2010	Friendly	Jamaica	2–1	?
Apr 20, 2011	Friendly	Ecuador	2–1	?

=== Rugby union ===
The stadium has hosted several rugby union matches, such as follows:

Date	Event	Home team	Score	Away team	Ref.
29 Oct 1985	New Zealand tour	Mar del Plata RU	6–56	New Zealand	
8 Jun 1989	Italy tour	Mar del Plata RU	9–26	Italy	
9 Jul 1991	New Zealand tour	Mar del Plata RU	6–48	New Zealand	
28 Jun 2008	Italy tour	Argentina	12–13	Italy	
19 Jun 2010	Scotland tour	Argentina	9–13	Scotland	

The stadium was also the main venue of the 2001 Rugby World Cup Sevens

=== Other sporting events hosted ===
- Torneos de Verano (1979–2019)
- 1995 Pan American Games
- 1999 South American U-20 Championship
- 2006 South American Women's Football Championship

== Music concerts ==
Some of the artists that have played at this stadium are Almendra (1980), Charly García (1984), Queen (1981), Rod Stewart (1989), Soda Stereo (1992), Luis Miguel (1994), La Renga (2006), Duran Duran (2007), Callejeros (2010), Joaquín Sabina (2010) and Ricardo Arjona (2015).

Preceded by (various venues in Germany)	FIFA World Cup; Venue; 1978	Succeeded by (various venues in Spain)
Preceded by Estadio Panamericano; Havana	Pan American Games; Opening and Closing Ceremonies; 1995	Succeeded by Canad Inns Stadium; Winnipeg
Preceded by Hong Kong Stadium; Hong Kong	Rugby World Cup Sevens; Venue; 2001	Succeeded by Hong Kong Stadium; Hong Kong
