= Hair fetishism =

Sexual attraction to hair

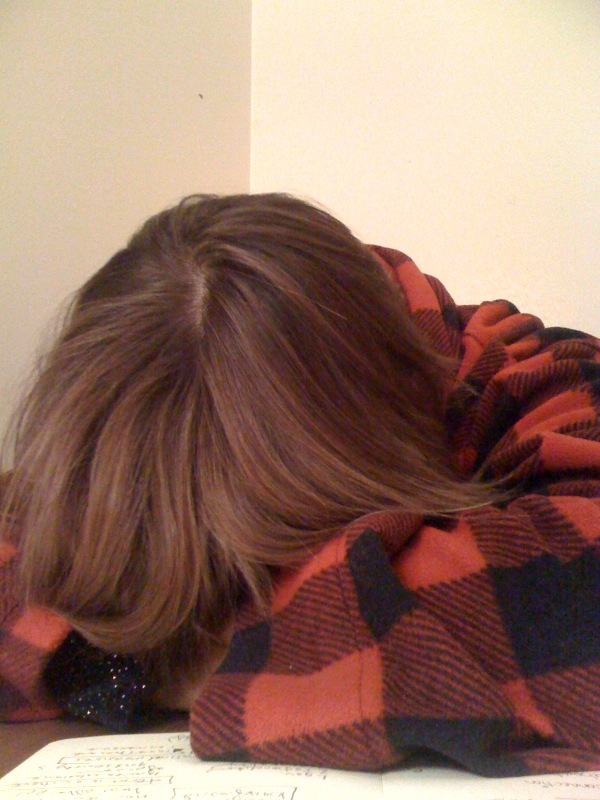
Head hair

Hair fetishism, also known as hair partialism and trichophilia, is a sexual fetish in which a person finds hair – most commonly head hair – to be particularly erotic and sexually arousing. Arousal may occur from seeing or touching hair, whether head hair or body hair. Head-hair arousal may come from seeing or touching very long or short hair, certain colors of hair, wet hair, or particular hairstyles.

Haircut fetishism is a related paraphilia in which a person is aroused by experiencing, performing, or observing the act of cutting or shaving head hair. The fetish may also extend to specific short haircut styles or to objects associated with hair cutting, such as electric clippers.

Bald fetishism is a related paraphilia regarding sexual attraction to full or partial baldness resulting either from the depilation of the scalp or various forms of alopecia; or attraction to those possessing these traits.

== Etymology ==
The word trichophilia comes from the Greek "tricha-" (τρίχα), which means hair, and the suffix "-philia" (φιλία), which means love.

== Characteristics ==
Hair is one of the defining characteristics of mammals. In humans, hair can be scalp hair, facial hair, chest hair, pubic hair, axillary hair, besides other places. Men tend to have hair in more places than women. Hair does not in itself have any intrinsic sexual value other than the attributes given to it by individuals in a cultural context. Some cultures are ambivalent in relation to body hair, with some being regarded as attractive while others being regarded as unaesthetic. Many cultures regard a woman's hair to be erotic. For example, many Muslim women cover their hair in public, and display it only to their family and close friends. Similarly, many Jewish women cover their hair after marriage. During the Middle Ages, European women were expected to cover their hair after they married, and according to the New Testament, a Christian woman should cover her head while in a church or in prayer.

Hair fetishism manifests itself in a variety of behaviors. A fetishist may enjoy seeing or touching hair, pulling on or cutting the hair of another person. Besides enjoyment they may become sexually aroused from such activities. It may also be described as an obsession, as in the case of hair washing or dread of losing hair. Arousal by head hair may arise from seeing or touching very long or short hair, wet hair, a certain color of hair or a particular hairstyle. Others may find the attraction of literally "having sex with somebody's hair" as a fantasy or fetish. The fetish can affect people of all genders and sexual orientations.

Some people feel pleasure when their hair is being cut or groomed. This is because they produce endorphins giving them a feeling which is similar to that of a head massage, laughter, or caress. Sigmund Freud stated that cutting woman's long hair by men may represent a fear and/or concept of castration, meaning that a woman's long hair represents a figurative penis and that by cutting off her hair a man may feel dominance as castrator, not the castrated one (while paradoxically also being reassured by the fact that the hair will grow again).

Trichophilia may present with different excitation sources, the most common being human head hair. Less commonly, trichophilia may also involve facial hair, chest hair, pubic hair, armpit hair, and other categories of body hair. Among the most common variants of this paraphilia are excitation by hair of a specific length, style, color (such as red or blonde), or texture (straight, curly, wavy, etc.). Trichophilia can relate to the excitement that is caused by plucking, pulling, cutting, or otherwise manipulating scalp or body hair.

Trichophilia is a paraphilia which is usually considered inoffensive.

== Prevalence ==
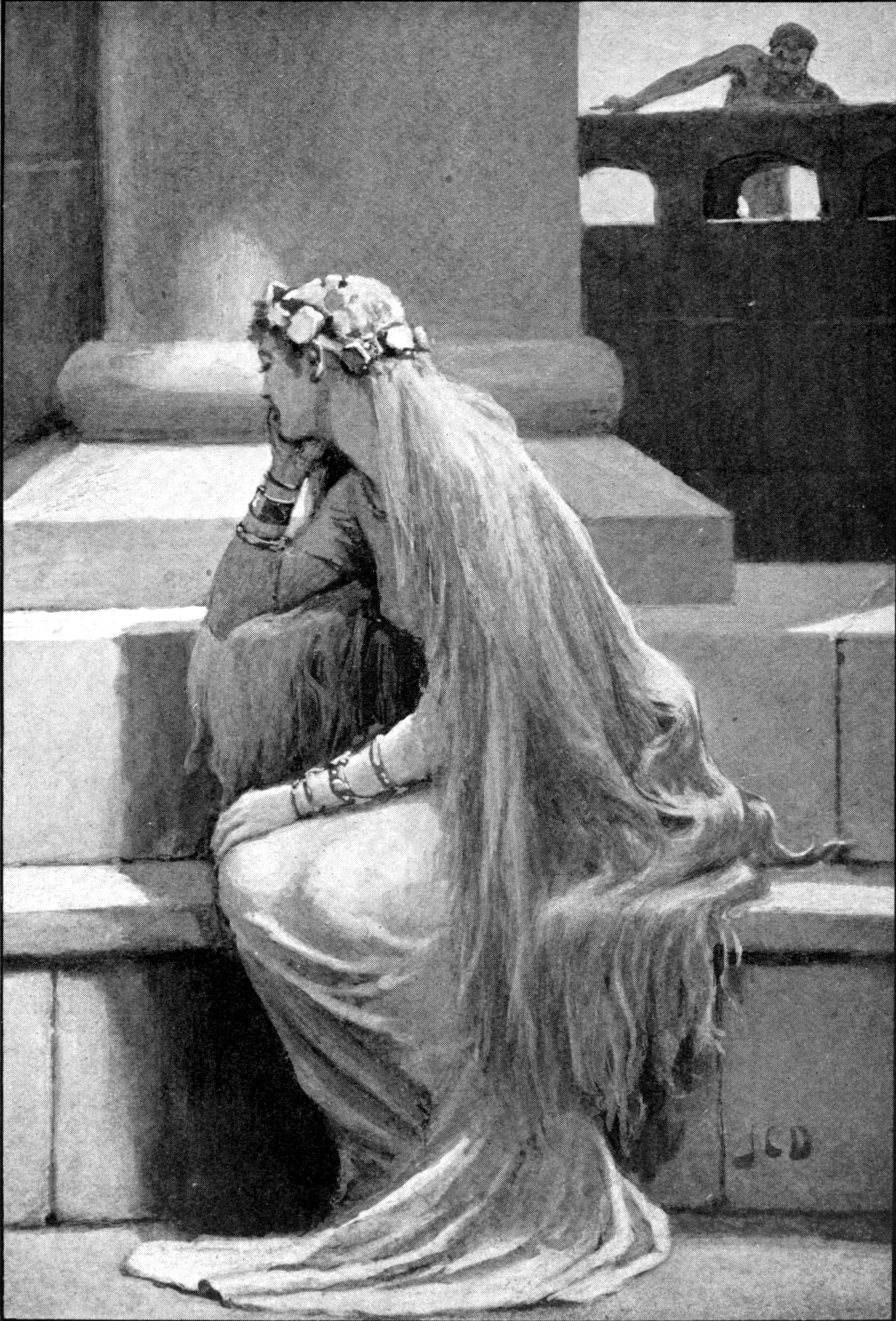
Sif (1909) by John Charles Dollman

In order to determine the relative prevalence of different fetishes, scientists obtained a sample of at least 5000 individuals worldwide, in 2007, from 381 Internet discussion groups. The relative prevalences were estimated based on (a) the number of groups devoted to a particular fetish, (b) the number of individuals participating in the groups and (c) the number of messages exchanged. Of the sampled population, 7 percent were sexually aroused by hair (as opposed to 12 for underwear, but only 4 for genitals, 3 for breasts, 2 for buttocks, and less than one for body hair).

A fetish magazine dedicated to the haircut fetish, The Razor's Edge, was published for several years from 1975. The publication focused on female models having their heads shaved.

== See also ==
- Fur fetishism
- Hair theft
- Hairstyle
- Hijab
- Paraphilia
- Bear (gay culture)
- Armpit fetishism
