= Armpit fetishism =

Sexual desire towards armpits

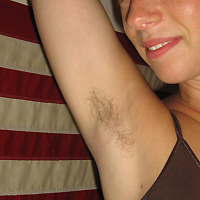
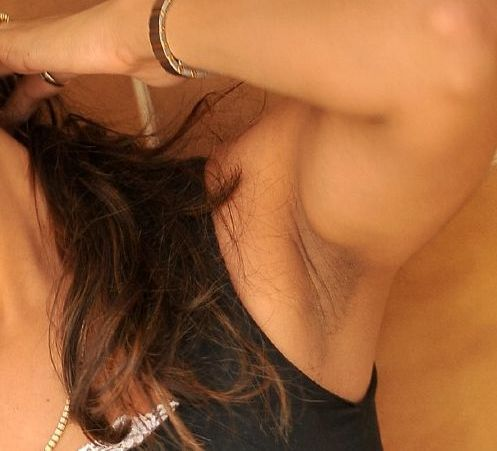
A woman's unshaven (left) and shaven (right) armpit

Armpit fetishism (also known as maschalagnia or axillism (also spelled axilism)) is a type of partialism in which a person is sexually attracted to armpits, which may lead to armpit intercourse (sexual activity with one or both armpits).

== Smell ==
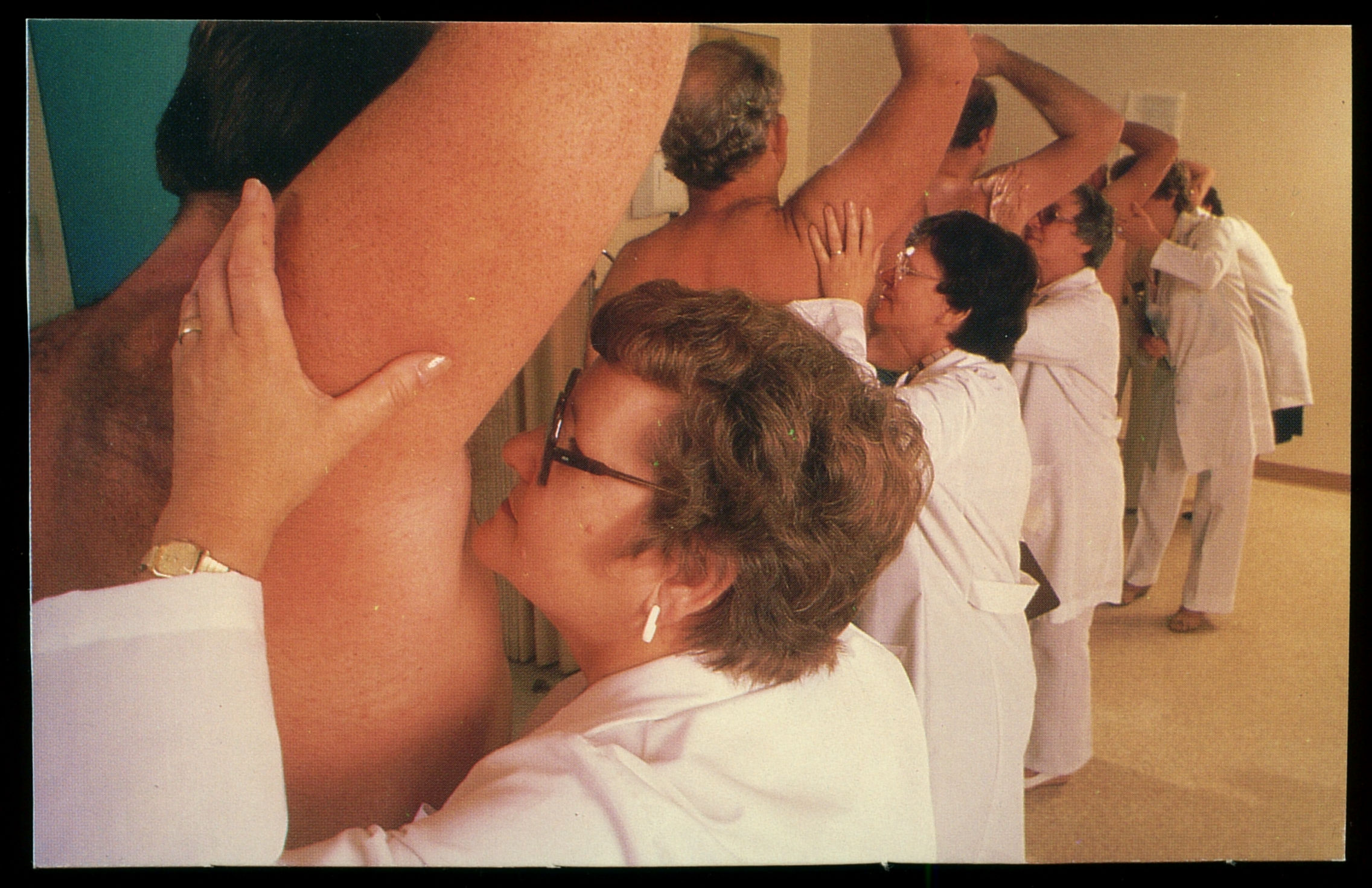
People smelling armpits

The natural body smell can be a powerful force in sexual attraction, and can be focused by the strong pungent odor of the armpit: Alex Comfort considered that for a woman to shave her armpits was “simply ignorant vandalism”, obliterating a powerful sexual tool, and praised the French for greater sexual awareness than American deodorant culture in this regard.

A woman's armpits, armpit hair, and secretions can be seen as essential components of their femininity, whether this is positively or negatively valued. Havelock Ellis found evidence that (in a non-sexual context) smelling one's own armpit could act as a temporary energy boost.

=== Pheromones ===
While humans undoubtedly are affected by odors both consciously and subconsciously, the existence of sex pheromones in humans has historically been highly disputed and the concept widely abused outside the sciences in areas such as marketing and pop psychology. While various studies have suggested the existence of human pheromones (sex-specific and otherwise), to date no study has succeeded in conclusively identifying any chemical substances as a human pheromone. How a human would perceive pheromones is similarly an enigma, as the vomeronasal organ (the primary pheromone receptor organ in mammals) is nonfunctional in humans and their closest relatives to the point that the nerves that would deliver information to the brain are outright absent, and no other reception mechanism has been confidently suggested.

== Fetish ==
Those who have a mild fetish for armpits often enjoy licking, kissing, tasting, tickling and smelling their partner's armpits during sexual foreplay, perhaps asking partners not to shower or wash their armpits nor wear deodorant for a period of hours or even days.

The symbolic equation of armpit and genitals may underpin the fetish, as also the odor. Sigmund Freud saw such fetishism as becoming problematic only when such preparatory acts substituted totally for intercourse as a final goal.

=== Bagpiping ===
Bagpiping is a sexual practice in which the penis is stimulated by someone else's armpit. The name comes from the manner of how bagpipes are played.

Stressing the importance in bagpiping of the (unlubricated) friction being confined to the penile shaft, Alex Comfort saw armpit intercourse as "Not an outstandingly rewarding trick but worth trying if you like the idea".

Problems may, however, arise in a relationship when penis to armpit contact becomes an exclusive sexual necessity for the armpit fetishist – something which can produce long-term sexual desire disorder in a couple.

== Literary associations ==
- The French novelist Huysmans wrote an essay 'Le Gousset' on the various smells of what he called the "spice-boxes" that were women's armpits.
- Havelock Ellis quotes a Chinese poet writing to his lover of "your odorous armpit ... that embalsamed nest".
- The folk-tale motif of vagina in armpit is known from Ohio to the East Indies.

== See also ==
- List of paraphilias
- Non-penetrative sex
- Petting
- Trichophilia
