= Long hair =

Hair length

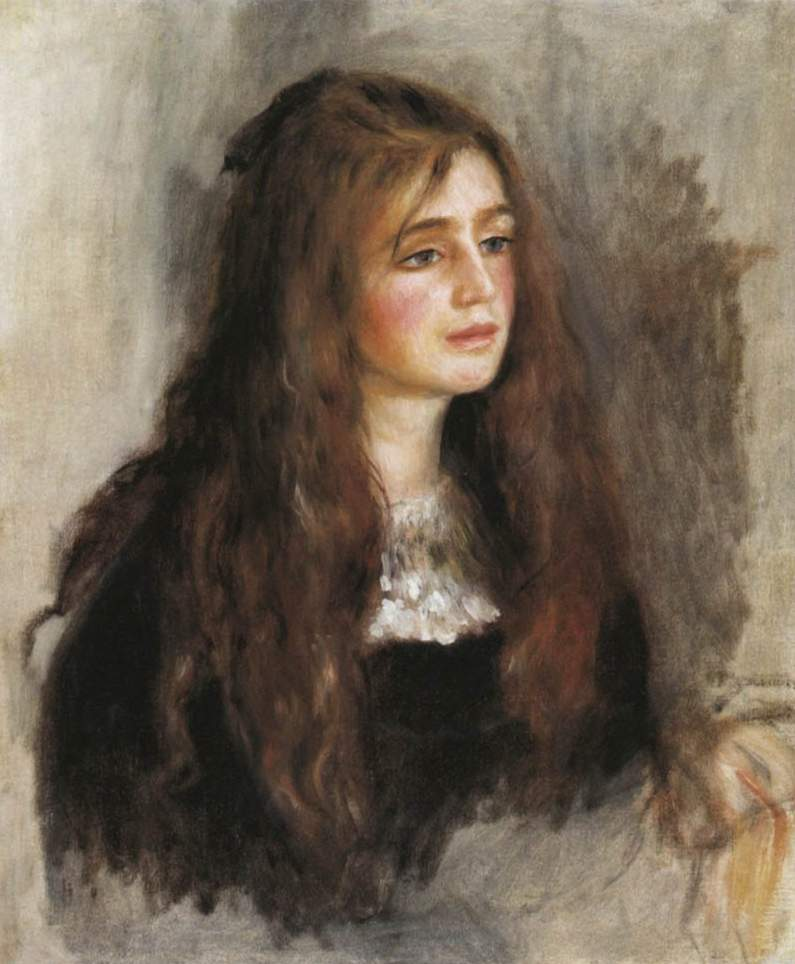
Portrait of Julie Manet by Renoir, 1894

Long hair is a hairstyle where the head hair is allowed to grow to a considerable length. Exactly what constitutes "long hair" can change from culture to culture, or even within cultures. For example, a woman with shoulder-length hair in some cultures may be said to have short hair to medium hair, while a man would be said to have long hair.

Long lustrous female hair is generally rated attractive by both men and women across cultures. The prevalence of trichophilia (hair partialism or fetishism) is 7% in the population, and very long hair is a common subject of devotion in this group.

== Biological significance ==
Humans, horses, orangutans, and lions are among the few species of mammals that may grow their head hair or manes very long. Humans are believed to have lost their fur 2.5–3 million years ago as hominids when transitioning from a forest habitat to the open savanna, as an effect of natural selection, since this development made it possible to run fast and hunt animals close to the equator without getting overheated. Head hair was an exception, which was a survival trait because it provides thermal insulation of the scalp from the sun, protects against ultraviolet radiation exposure (UV), and provides cooling (when sweat evaporates from soaked hair). The ability to grow straight hair has been observed among Homo sapiens sub-groups in less sunny regions further away from the equator. Relative to kinked Afro-textured hair, straight hair allows more UV light to pass to the scalp (which is essential for the production of vitamin D, which is important for bone development).

The ability to grow very long hair may be a result of sexual selection since long and healthy hair is a sign of fertility. An evolutionary biology explanation for this attraction is that hair length and quality may act as a cue to youth and health, signifying a woman's reproductive potential. As hair grows slowly, long hair may reveal 2–3 years of a person's health status, nutrition, age, and reproductive fitness. Malnutrition, and deficiencies in minerals and vitamins due to starvation, cause loss of hair or changes in hair color (e.g. dark hair turning reddish).

== Psychological significance ==
Anthropologists speculate that the functional significance of long head hair may be adornment, a by-product of secondary natural selection once other androgenic/somatic hair (body hair) had largely been lost. Another possibility is that long head hair is a result of Fisherian runaway sexual selection, where long lustrous hair is a visible marker for a healthy individual. For some groups or individuals, however, short hair is the selected trait.

By seven to nine months, infants can tell the sexes apart based on hair length, vocal pitch, and faces.

== Cultural meaning ==
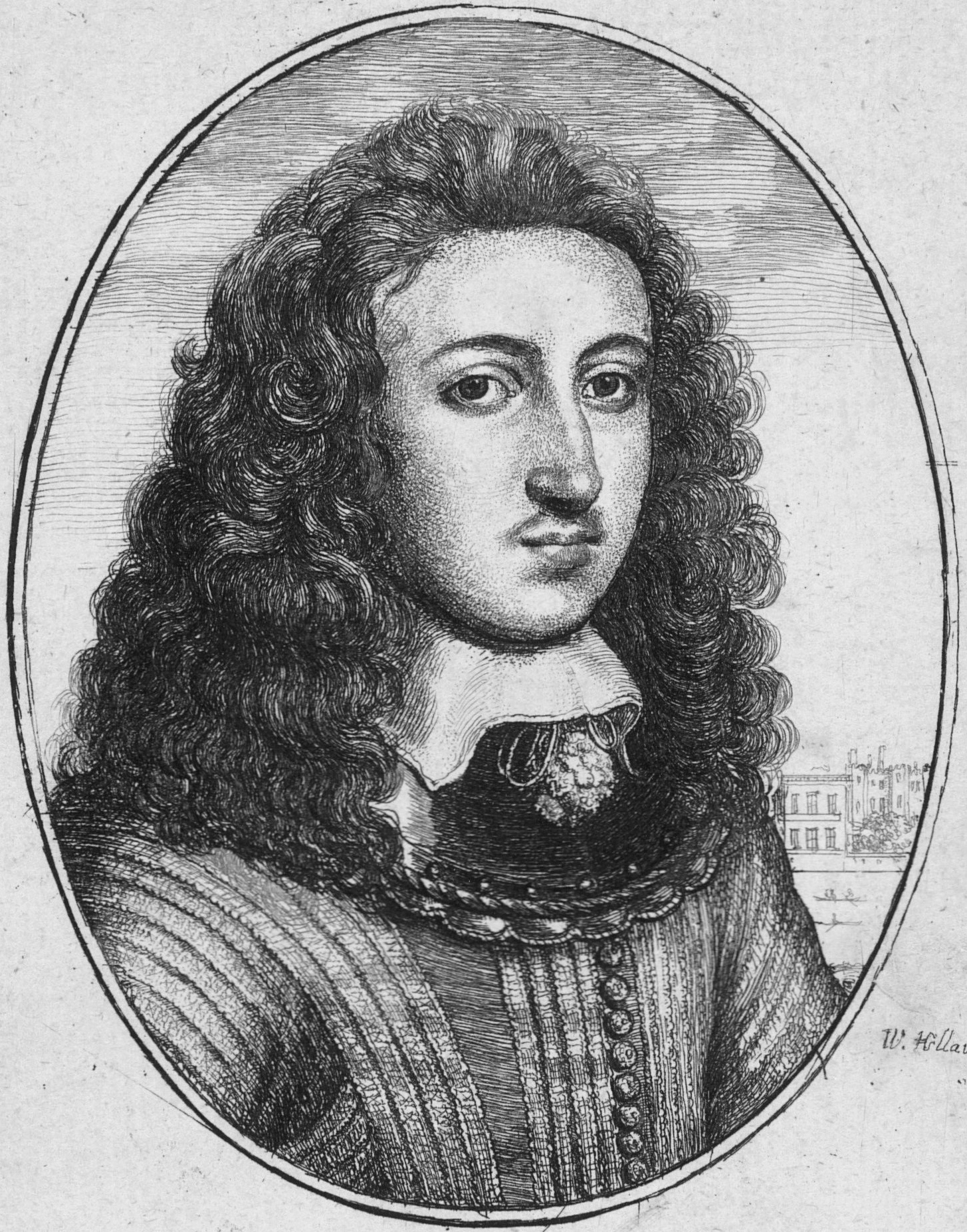
A man with shoulder length hair, 1659

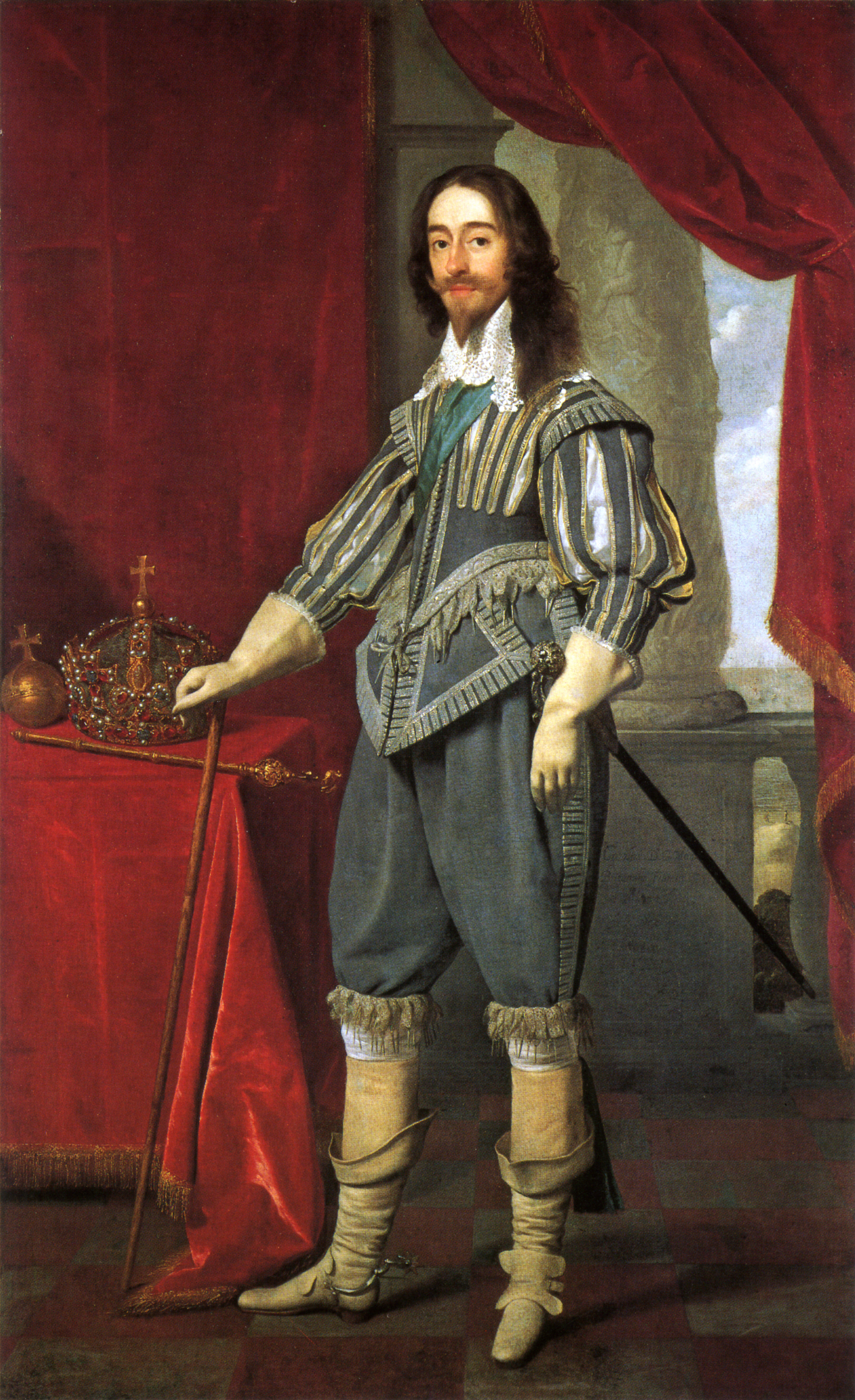
Charles I with long, natural hair in a portrait by Daniel Mytens, c. 1631

Ways of life often viewed as more rigid, such as soldiering and religious discipline, frequently have explicit rules regarding hair length. For example, Buddhist monks shave their heads as part of their order of worship. Similarly, religious men with long hair is exemplified in modern Paganism, among Nazarites in the Hebrew Bible (Samson being a well-known example) and among the Sikhs. Other cultures may view male long hair negatively; historically, some conquering groups have used the long hair of conquered people as a symbol of their imagined "otherness" or inferiority, as was the case with the Gaelic Irish under English rule and the Moors under Spanish rule in medieval Spain.

East Asian cultures have traditionally associated unkempt hair in a woman with an irresponsible attitude, as women in East Asia were expected to tie up their hair in styles such as the ponytail, plait, or any bun, as a symbol of responsibility.

== Transferred meaning ==
The traditional connotation of "long hair" in English meant, roughly, someone artistically knowledgeable or wise, an aesthete. As a descriptive term, it has been applied to Merovingians and classical music enthusiasts, as well as hippies and aesthetes.

== Hair lengths ==
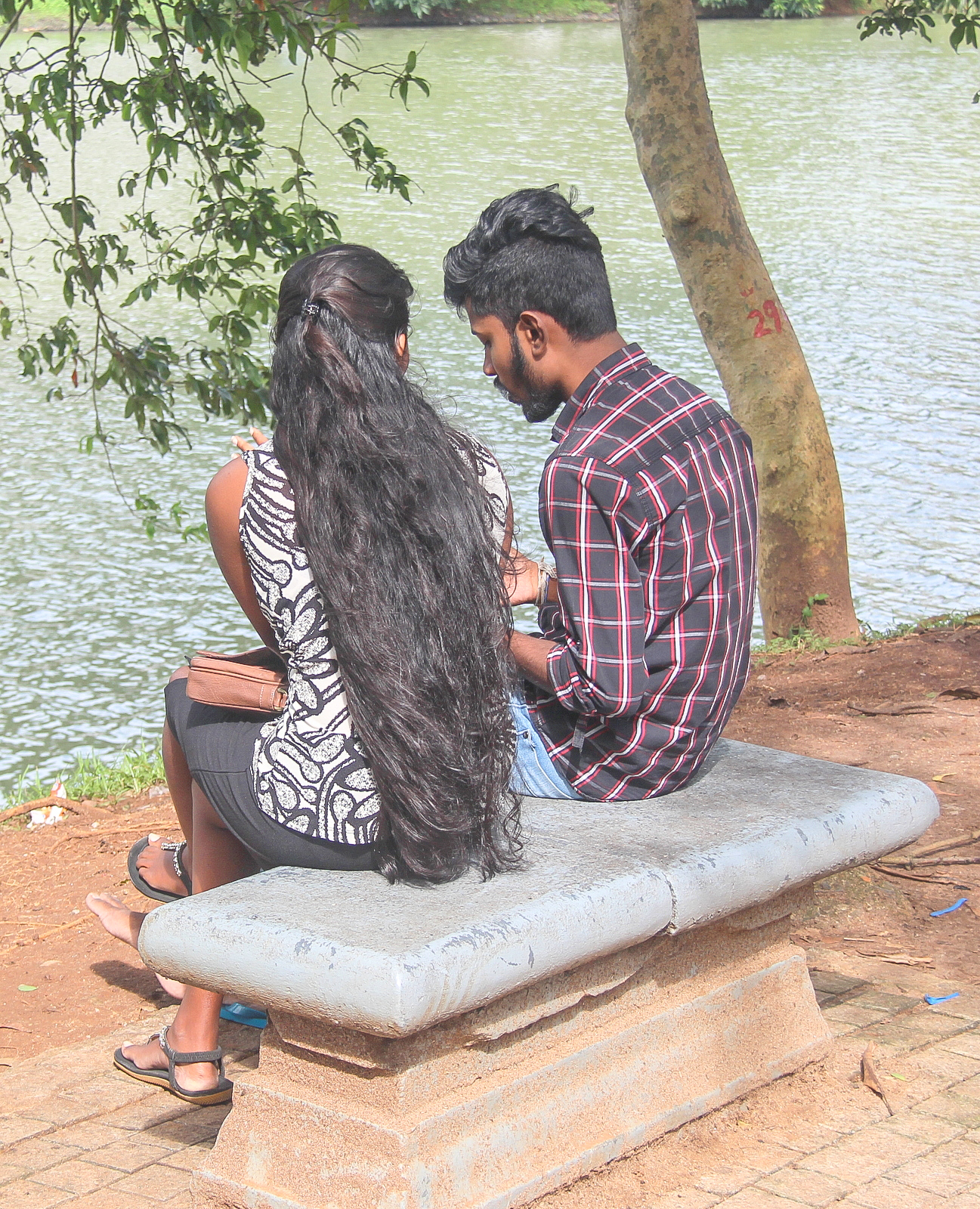
A Sri Lankan woman with classical length hair with a man with short hair

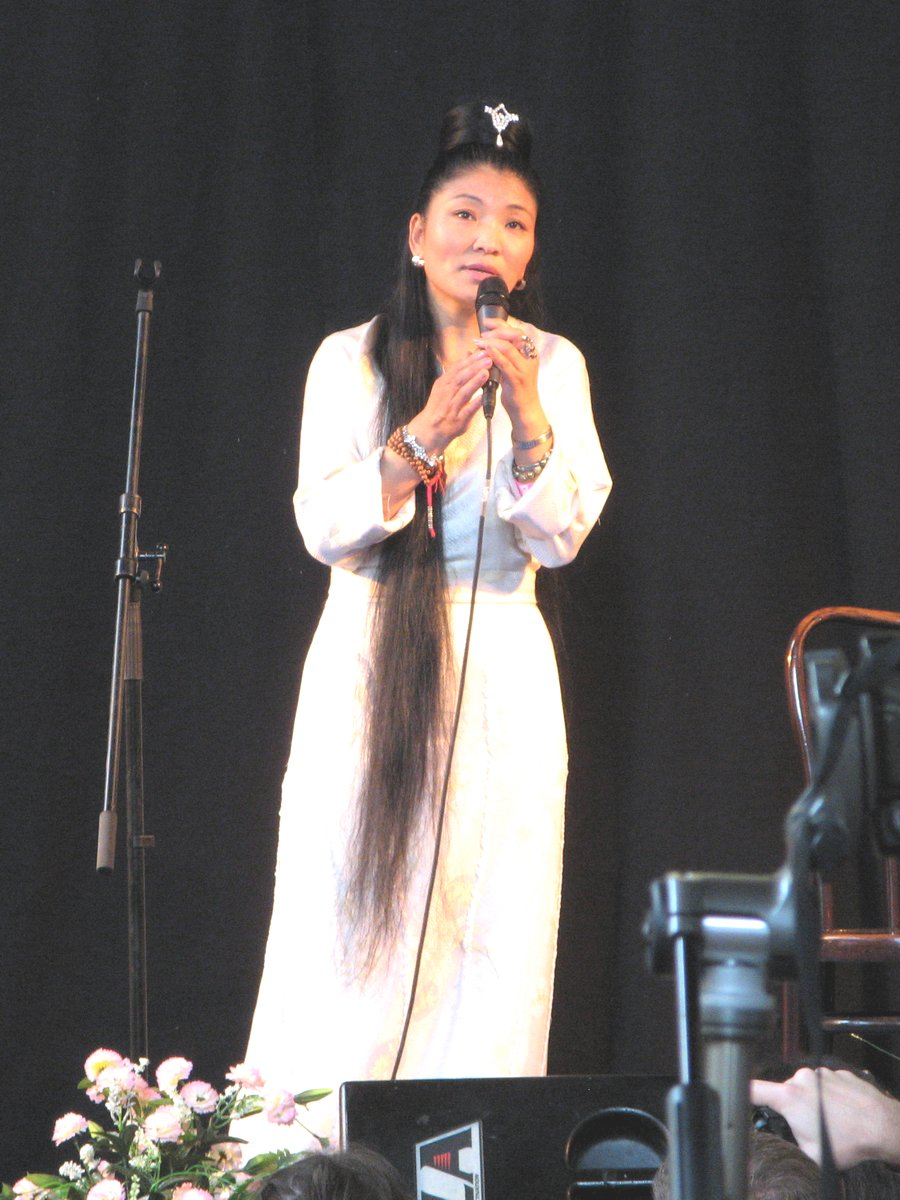
A Tibetan woman with knee-length hair

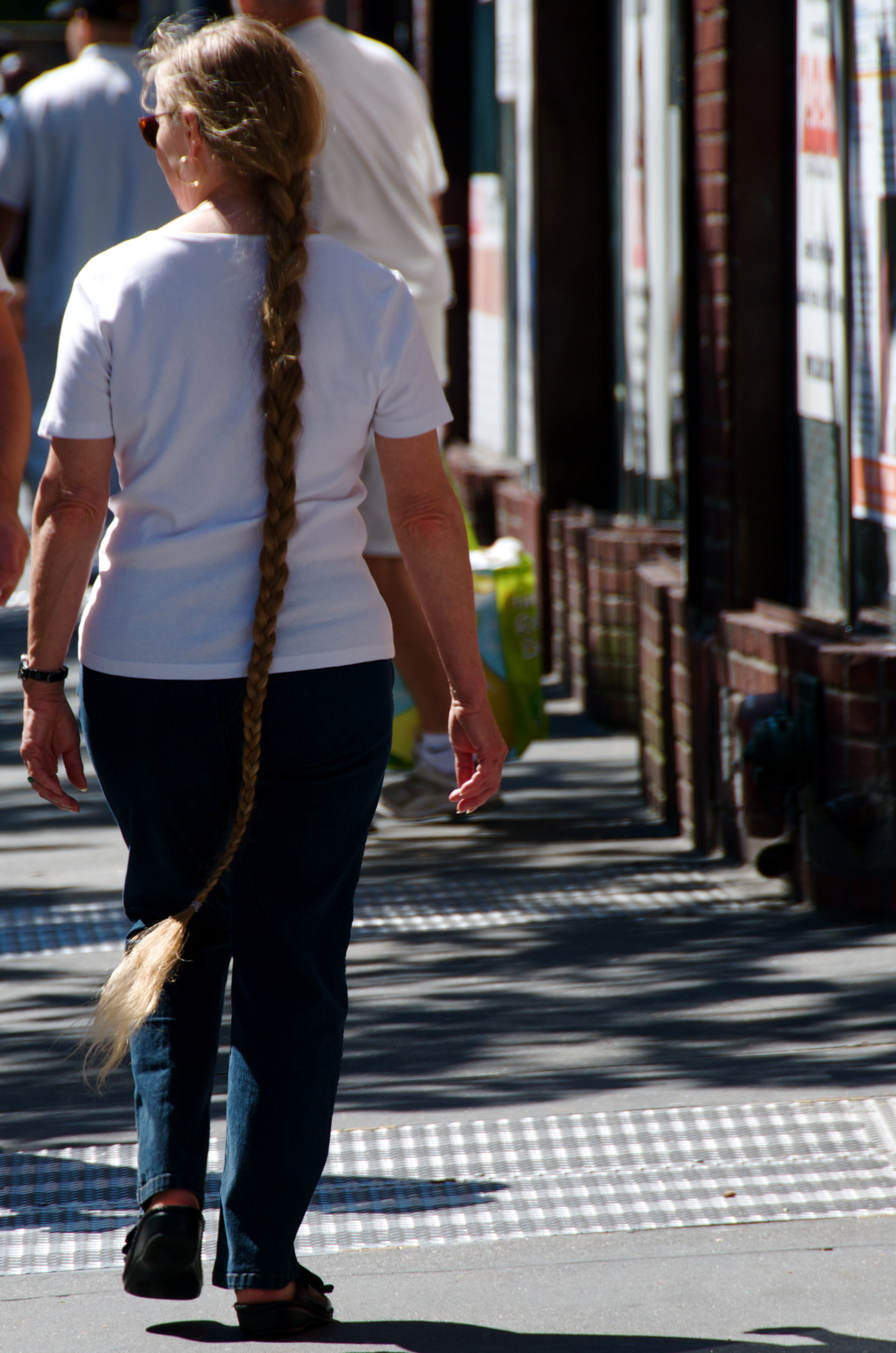
An American woman with calf-length braided hair

Hair length is most often measured (in centimeters or inches) from the line of the scalp on the forehead up over the highest point of the skull to its termination, and sometimes from the crown, the latter resulting in 10 centimeter lower values in average. In cosmetology, hair lengths are usually categorized according to the part of the body where the bulk of the longest hair terminates: chin level, shoulder length, armpit-length, lower shoulderblade/mid-back level, waist length, hip-length, classic length (extends to almost buttock-length, i.e. upper thigh-length, where the legs meet the buttocks), thigh-length, knee-length and ankle/floor length hair.

Hair usually takes about two years to reach shoulder length, and about seven years to reach waist-length/hip-length, including occasional trims (approximately 80–90 cm (31–35 in) from forehead for most people).

=== Maximum hair length ===
The maximum hair length that is possible to reach is about 15 centimetres (5.9 in) for infants (below the age of 1), about 60 centimetres (24 in) for children, and generally 100 centimetres (39 in) for adults. Some individuals can reach excessive lengths. Lengths greater than 150 centimetres (59 in) are frequently observed in long hair contests. Xie Qiuping had the longest documented hair in the world, measuring 5.627 metres (18 ft 5.54 in) in May 2004.

The maximum terminal hair length depends on the length of the anagen (period of hair growth) for the individual. Waist-length hair or longer is only possible to reach for people with long anagen. The anagen lasts between 2 and 7 years, for some individuals even longer, and is followed by shorter catagen (transition) and telogen (resting) periods. At any given time, about 85% of hair strands are in anagen. The fibroblast growth factor 5 (FGF5) gene affects the hair cycle in mammals including humans; blocking FGF5 in the human scalp (by applying a herbal extract that blocks FGF5) extends the hair cycle, resulting in less hair fall and increased hair growth.

== Cultural history ==
=== Europe ===
==== Ancient Greece and Rome ====
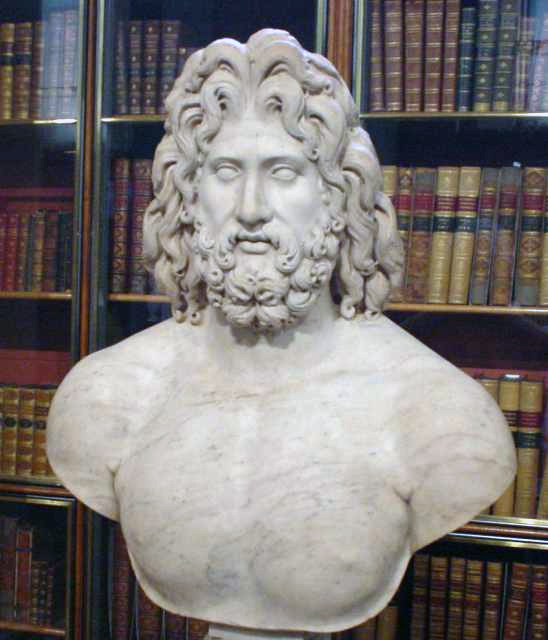
Roman marble colossal head of a long-haired Zeus, 2nd century AD

In ancient Greece, long male hair was a symbol of wealth and power, while a shaven head was appropriate for a slave. The ancient Greeks had several gods and heroes who wore their hair long, including Zeus, Achilles, Apollo, and Poseidon. Greek soldiers are said to have worn their hair long in battle. Such warriors considered it a sign of aristocracy and are said to have combed it openly to show off. Also, in order to keep enemies from getting hold of it in battle, they were known to cut the front short, but leave it long in the back, where it was more out of reach (mullet). A widely held alternative interpretation of the conventional belief is that they kept it long, and simply tied it back in a style known as a ponytail in order to keep it out of their enemies' reach. The ponytail method allowed warriors, who often traveled to battle with a minimal amount of equipment so that they could avoid excessively heavy loads over long marches, to keep their hair manageable with a small piece of string to hold it in place and a knife to cut the back to length with one slice. Around the 6th century, however, the Greek men shifted to shorter hairstyles, with the exception of the Spartans. Women in the culture kept the longer style, which for them showed freedom, health, and wealth, as well as good behavior. With men, long hair by this time was considered a sign of false pride.

Pliny the Elder in his Natural History and Varro related that the Romans did not begin to cut their hair short until barbers were introduced to Italy from Sicily by P. Ticinius Mena in 299 BC. Women in Roman times valued long hair, usually with a center part. Apart from in the earliest times, men's hair was usually shorter than women's, although other cultures of the time, such as Greeks in the east, considered long hair to be typical of philosophers, who were thought to be too engrossed in learning to bother with hair. Strictly in the province of Rome, however, the shorter hairstyle was especially popular. When Julius Caesar conquered the Gauls, who favored long hair, he ordered theirs to be cut short.

==== Middle Ages ====
In the European Middle Ages, shorter hair often signified servitude and the peasantry, while long hair was often attributed to freemen, as was the case with the Germanic Goths and Merovingians.

The Gaelic Irish (both men and women) took great pride in their long hair—for example, a person could be heavily fined for cutting a man's hair short against his will. When the Anglo-Normans and the English colonized Ireland, hair length came to signify one's allegiance. Irishmen who cut their hair short were deemed to be forsaking their Irish heritage. Likewise, English colonists who wore their hair long in the back were deemed to be forsaking their role as English subjects and giving in to the Irish life. Thus, hair length was one of the most common ways of judging a true Englishman in this period. Muslims in Christian areas were ordered to keep their hair short and parted, as their longer style was considered rebellious and barbaric.

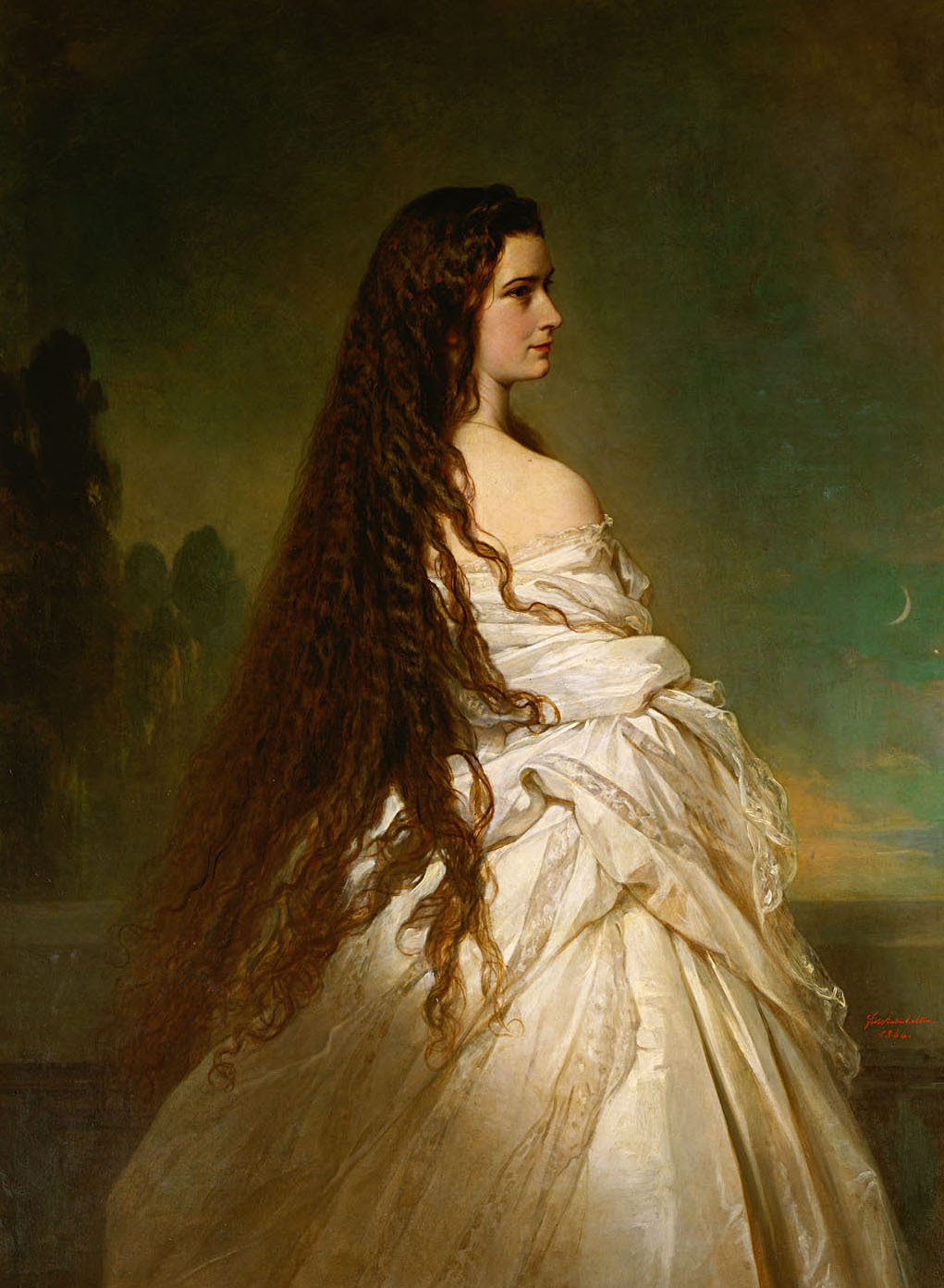
Empress Elisabeth of Austria wearing thigh-length hair in 1865. (Painting by Franz Xaver Winterhalter)

The long hair tradition was widespread among English and French men in the 11th and 12th centuries, although it was considered acceptable for men to have shorter hair, mainly because of the endorsement of the Roman Catholic Church. The tradition was largely brought about by monarchs who rejected the shorter hairstyle, causing the people to follow. Wulfstan, a religious leader, worried that those with longer hair would fight like women, and be unable to protect England from foreign invasion. Similar ideas can be found among later military leaders as well, such as those of the American Confederacy. Knights and rulers would also sometimes cut or pull out their hair in order to show penitence and mourning, and a squire's hair was generally worn shorter than a knight's. Married women who let their hair flow out in public were frowned upon, as this was normally reserved for the unwed, although they were allowed to let it out in mourning, to show their distressed state. Through these centuries it was expected of Eastern Christians to wear long hair as well as long beards, which was expected especially of clergy and monks.

In England, during the English Civil Wars of 1642 to 1651, male hair length was emblematic of the disputes between Cavaliers and Roundheads (Puritans). Cavaliers wore longer hair, and were less religious-minded, being thought of by the Roundheads as lecherous. The more devout Roundheads typically had somewhat shorter hair.

Around this time, long hair in England also came to be associated with adventurers who traveled to America and were familiar with the native culture there, short hair was associated with less adventurous types.

==== Trends among women in 20th and 21st centuries ====
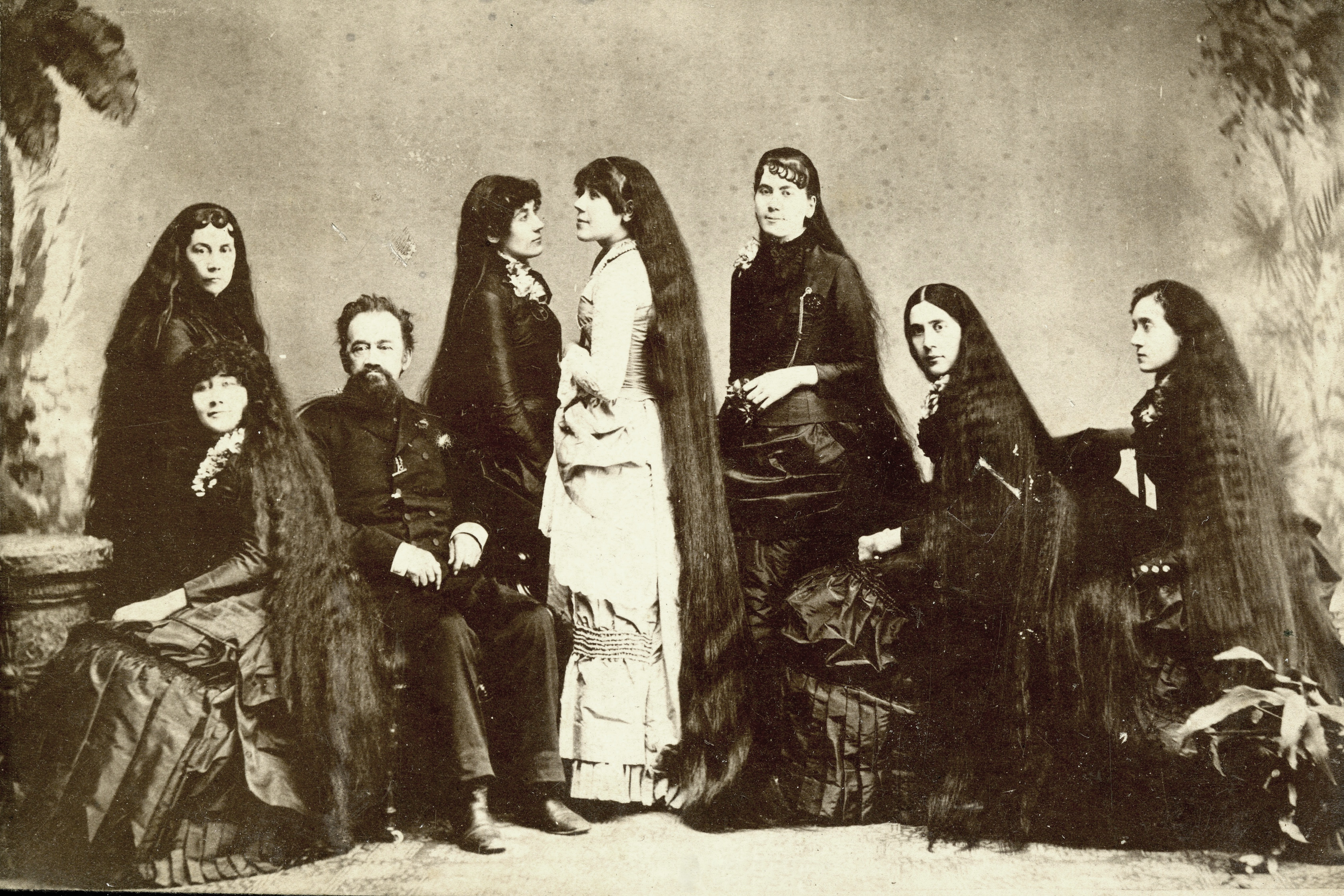
The Seven Sutherland Sisters were singing and showing off their famous floor-length hair in a sideshow of Barnum & Bailey's from about 1882 to 1907.

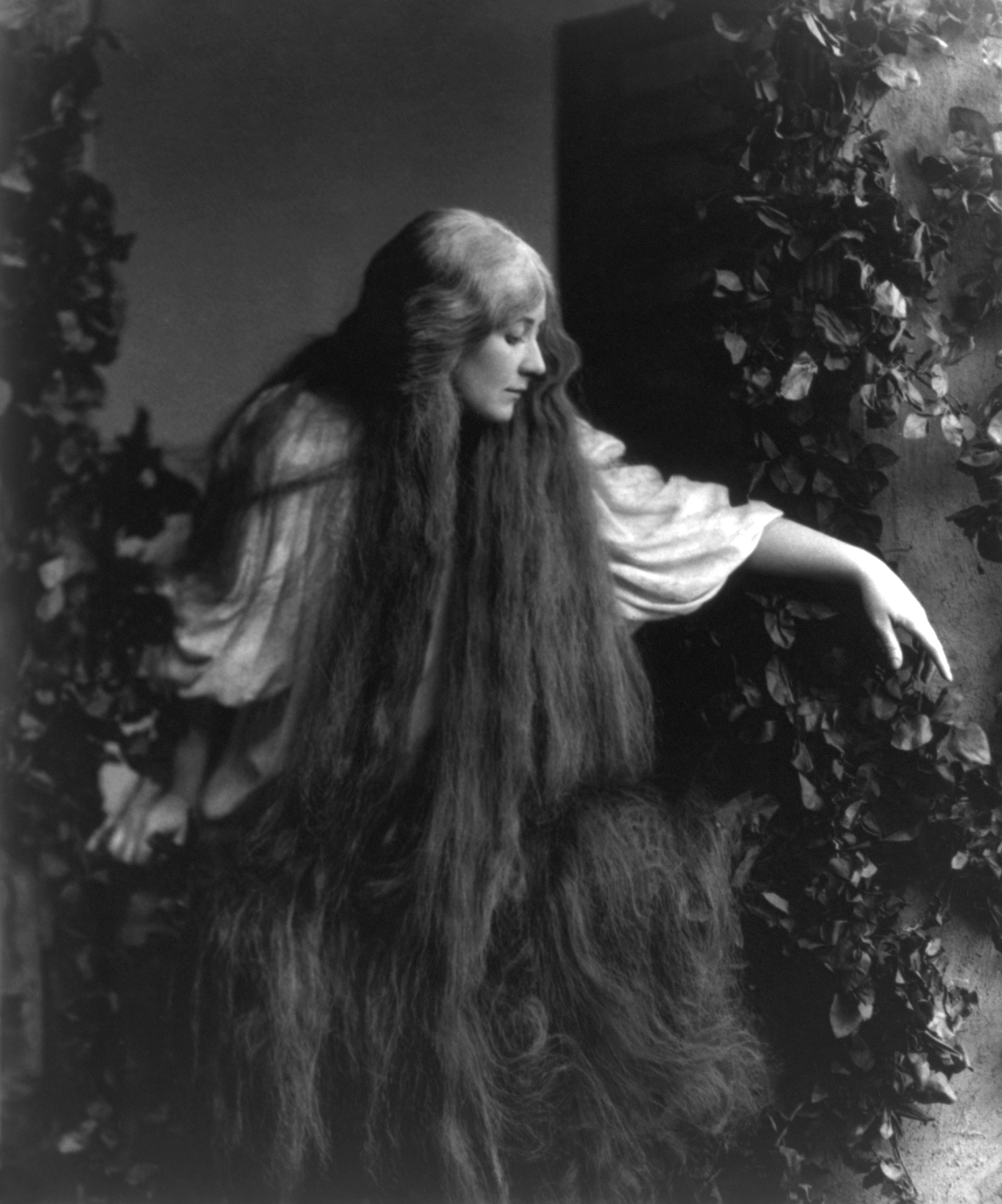
Opera singer Mary Garden with knee-length hair, circa 1905.

Growing and wearing long hair was common among women in the Western world until World War One. Long female hair never ceased in western culture, though it was rare during the 1920s and 1930s.

In most current cultures, it is more typical for women to wear long hair than for men to do so. An American study shows significant correlation between hair length and age, which indicates that younger women tend to have longer hair than older women. A significant correlation was also found between women's hair length and hair quality. Moreover, hair quality was correlated with the women's perceived physical health. Consistent with principles of evolutionary psychology, these results indicate that hair length and quality can act as a cue to a woman's youth and health, signifying reproductive potential. The correlation between the woman's hair length and marital status, or number of children, was however not more than to be expected from the correlation between hair length and age.

==== Trends among men in 20th and 21st centuries ====
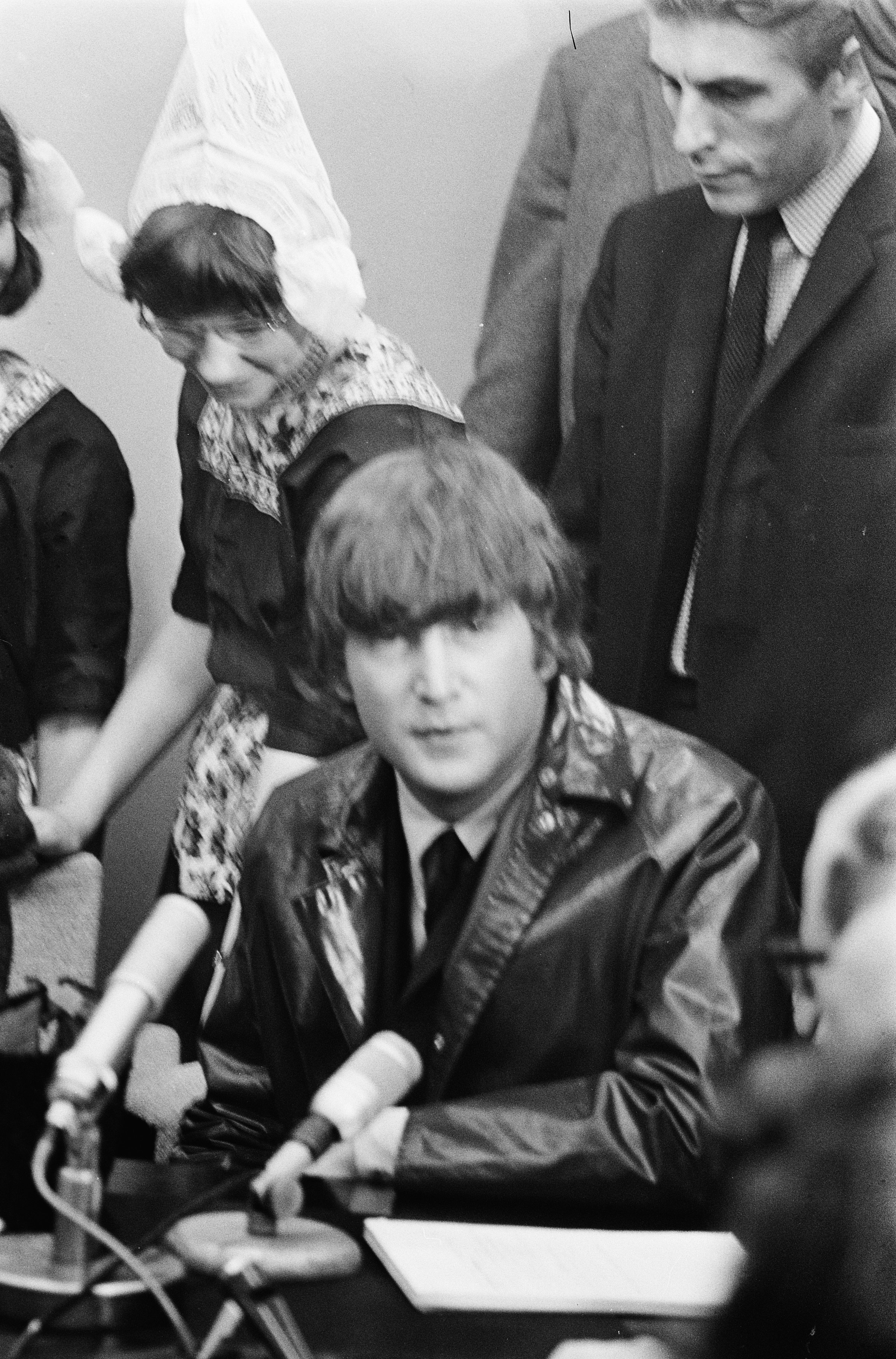
Long male hair in Western youth culture became popular in the 1960s and 1970s with the Beatles, as seen in this picture of band member John Lennon in 1964.

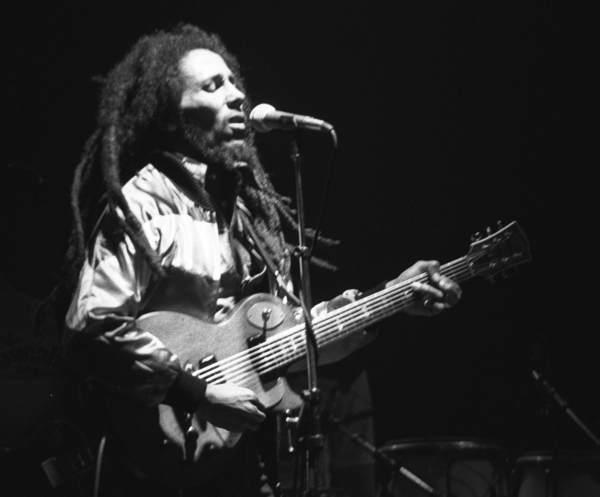
Bob Marley made rastafari culture and dreadlocks popular also outside Jamaica.

During the 19th century male hair lengths in Western cultures had varied widely; according to nationality, occupation, age, social status and passing fashion. Prior to World War One, beards had largely been replaced by moustaches and hair was most commonly cut to a medium/short length. However, short hair on men was introduced in World War One for soldiers. The trench warfare engaged in from 1914 to 1918 exposed men to flea and lice infestations, which prompted orders by the higher command to cut hair short, establishing a new military tradition.

Beat poets during the 1950s wore longer hairstyles. Aside from that, men and boys at this point had neatly groomed short hair, and having longer hair was frowned upon. By 1960, a small "beatnik" community in Newquay, Cornwall, England (including a young Wizz Jones) had attracted the attention of their neighbors for growing their hair to a length past the shoulders, resulting in a television interview with Alan Whicker on BBC television's Tonight series. The 1960s also introduced The Beatles, who started a more widespread longer hair trend. The social revolution of the 1960s led to a renaissance of unchecked hair growth, and long hair, especially on men, was worn as a political or countercultural symbol or protest and as a symbol of masculinity. This cultural symbol extended to several countries in the Americas, Western Europe, South Africa, and Australia. The trend even spread to some Eastern Bloc countries, such as the Mánička subculture of Czechoslovakia, which was met with discrimination by the authorities, who saw it as unwanted Western capitalistic influence. Specific long hairstyles such as dreadlocks have been part of counterculture movements seeking to define other alternative cultures and lifestyles since this time. Longer hair in general remained popular due to the youth rebellion throughout the liberal decade of the 1960s. The long hair trend grew with the spread of the hippie movement in the 1960s and, in the 1970s, longer hair styles would become the norm among men and women.

In the 1970s, the popularity of Jamaica's reggae music and musician Bob Marley prompted interest in dreadlocks internationally. The anti-establishment philosophy of Rastafari, echoed in much of the reggae of the time, resonated with left-leaning youth of all ethnicities – especially and primarily among African Americans and other Blacks, but among counterculture Whites as well. In the 1980s, the view of long hair as a solitary signifier of political or counter-cultural identity was countered and parodied in films such as Rambo and many other militaristic heroes of media which challenged then-contemporary views of tradition. Today, longer hairstyles among men are still quite popular among neopagans and rock enthusiasts; for example, musicians in metal bands and their fans often wear long hair. Long hair may be grown for the purpose of its being donated to an organization, such as Locks of Love, that provides hairpieces to help those who can not have hair otherwise, such as those who are diagnosed with alopecia areata. Today long hair has gained even more popularity. Even among mainstream men it is socially acceptable to have hair reaching around the upper back. This could in part be due to the "man bun" trend where men pull their shoulder length or longer hair back into a topknot bun.

=== Americas ===
==== Native Americans ====
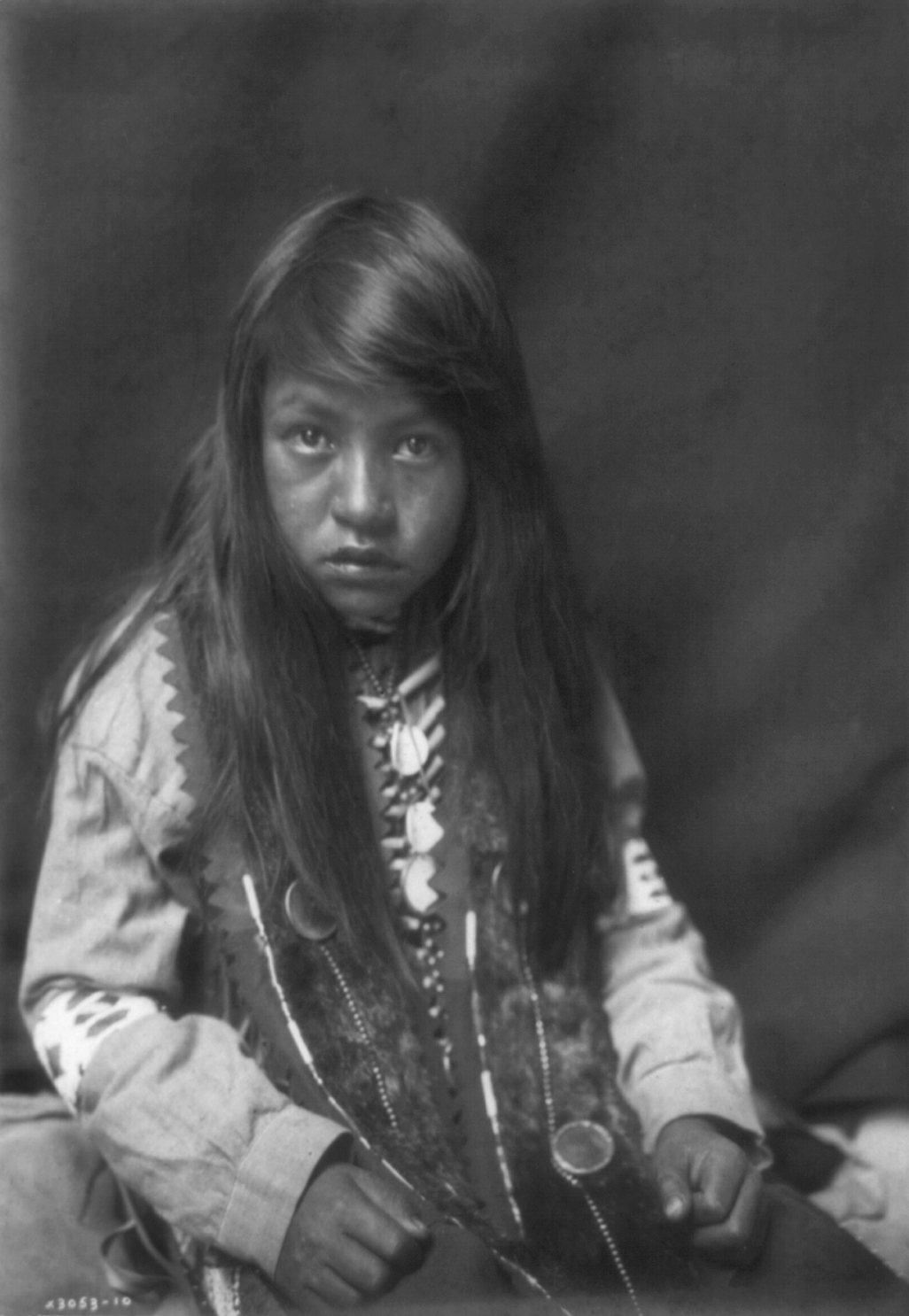
Yakama boy with mid-back level hair. (Photo by Edward S. Curtis)

Many Native American men wore long hair before the arrival of Western influences on their culture. In Cherokee legends, for example, males said to be handsome were often described as having "long hair almost to the ground" or similar formulas. Both men and women of these cultures have frequently struggled to maintain their tradition but have faced heavy opposition. Many consider it a sign of giving in to Western influences to have their hair cut. Early US settlers saw long-haired, native men as rebelling against their civilized society. Mountain men and trappers who adopted Native customs were also considered amoral, and often identified by their long hair. Since the cultural movements of the Sixties and Seventies, however, Native Americans have felt less pressure to have short hair, as different movements have defended their cultural rights. For example, several states have loosened prison regulations, allowing Native Americans to wear long hair during incarceration, along with other cultural allowances.

==== African Americans ====
When African slaves were freed in America, they struggled to reach the social status of whites. Many former slaves tried to conform their hairstyles as part of this struggle. Women, especially, felt pressure to make their hair straight, rather than keeping the tightly coiled style they had known. However, during the civil rights movement of the 1950s and 1960s, African-Americans such as Malcolm X advocated hairstyles such as Afros and dreadlocks, in order to embrace their race, and to return to West African roots.

Social pressures at the time were heavily influencing these American women to have straight hair like white people did. This resulted in the Black is beautiful movement, wherein African Americans wore their long natural hair untreated and not modified. More recently, hair extensions have become widespread. Some scholars posit that there is continued pressure on black women to have straight smooth hair. Amelia Jones posits that dolls for children, such as Barbie dolls, add to this pressure, citing as an example a new, black Barbie doll with straight hair. Blacks, she believes, should be able to be themselves without feeling pressured to "tame" their hair.

==== Contemporary North America ====
"She, as a veil down to the slender waist,
Her unadorned golden tresses wore
Dishevelled, but in wanton ringlets waved,
As the vine curls her tendrils..."

– John Milton's description of Eve in Paradise Lost

In 1972, it was estimated that 24% of American women wore shoulder length hair or longer (44% of women in ages 14 to 44), with slightly more than 12% of men and women altogether. Similar frequency was found in 2001, when it was estimated that about 13% of the US adult population, male as well as female, have hair shoulder-length or longer, about 2.4% have hair reaching to the bottom of the shoulder blades or longer, about 0.3% have hair waist length or longer, and only about 0.017% have hair buttocks-length or longer.

By extrapolating the above data and the number of hair length records, the number of people with shoulder-length hair or longer in the US is estimated to be 27 million, those with waist-length hair roughly 900,000, those with buttocks-length hair to be 40,000, with knee length hair to 2,000 and with ankle length hair to 70.

Other data estimates that 2–3% of US men have long hair, and an additional 2% have borderline long hair, leaving 95–96% with short hair. It has also been estimated that 24% of women have long hair and 43% have medium length hair, leaving 33% with short hair. Given that men comprise 49.2% of the US population and women 50.8%, the estimated breakup of hair length by gender among Americans is 47% men with short hair, 22% women with medium hair, 17% women with short hair, 12% women with long hair, 1% men with long hair, and 1% men with medium hair. This leaves, as a total, 64% people with short hair, 23% people with medium hair, and 13% people with long hair.

=== Africa ===
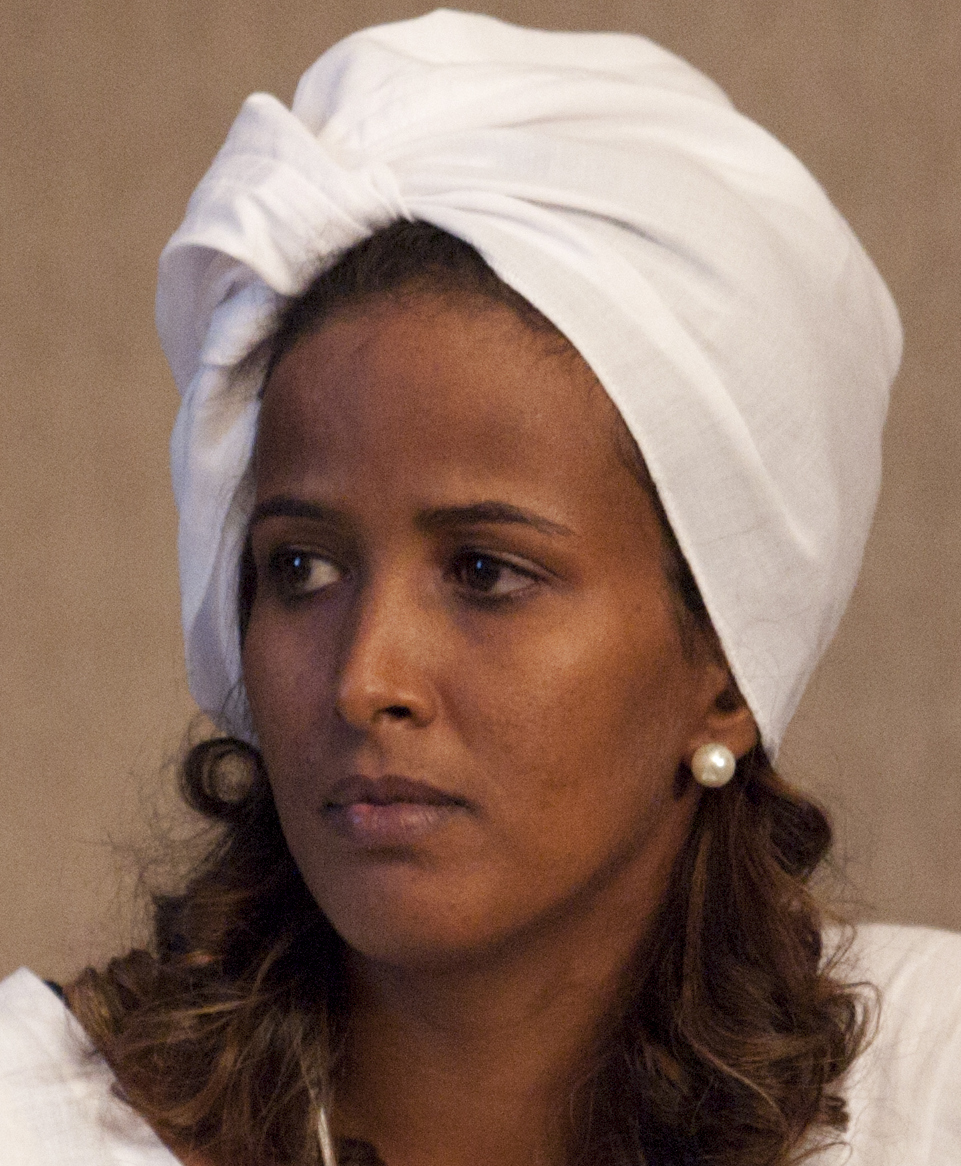
Somali woman with shoulder-length hair

Throughout much of Africa, afro-textured hair is the most frequent hair form, except among the Afro-Asiatic (Hamito-Semitic) speaking populations in North Africa and the Horn of Africa. In the latter regions, naturally long hair is instead more common.

In West African cultures, women with long hair were highly valued. Long, thick hair was seen as a sign of health, strength, and capability to bear many children. In keeping with this general theme, women who were too young for marriage would shave a portion of their heads to signal so. This tradition, however, did not extend to every West African culture, as several valued shorter hair.

=== Asia ===
Historically, East Asian cultures viewed long hair as a sign of youth and aesthetic beauty. Long hair is associated with private life and sexuality. East Asian cultures see long, unkempt hair in a woman as a sign of sexual intent or a recent sexual encounter, as usually their hair is tied up. Lay Buddhists have long hair, while Buddhist monks have shaved heads.

==== China ====
In ancient China and Korea, hair was regarded as a precious legacy from parents. Most people would never cut their hair after they became adults, and cutting off one's hair was a penalty for minor crimes. Both men and women would coil up their hair and many hair-coiling styles were developed.

Beginning in 1619, the Qing dynasty forced all men in China to adopt the queue: a long braid down the back with the hair near the forehead completely shaved. Hair length and style became a life-or-death matter in 1645 as the Manchu told them either their hair or their head would be cut. Nearly every Han rebel group began by shearing this pigtail (most especially in the case of the Taiping, who were known in Chinese as the "Longhairs"), but the queue on penalty of death lasted until 1911, when the Chinese people cut their queues in unison at a time of rebellion. Americans at first judged Chinese immigrant laborers to be poor workers because their long hair brought an association with women.

Islamic and Christian missionaries among the Chinese were strong advocates of shorter male hair for their converts. Around the Destruction of Four Olds period in 1964, almost anything seen as part of Traditional Chinese culture would lead to problems with the Communist Red Guards. Items that attracted dangerous attention if observed in public included jewelry and long hair on males. These things were regarded as symbols of a bourgeois lifestyle, representing the avaricious pursuit of wealth. People had to avoid displaying them or suffer serious consequences such as being subjected to torture and beatings by the Red Guards. In late 1983, conservative factions of the Chinese Communist Party launched the short and unsuccessful Anti-Spiritual Pollution Campaign, which included the ridiculing of long hair.

Also, in Chinese ancient and modern poetry, long hair is a common symbol used by poets, for example Li Bai and Li Shangyin, to express their depression and sadness.

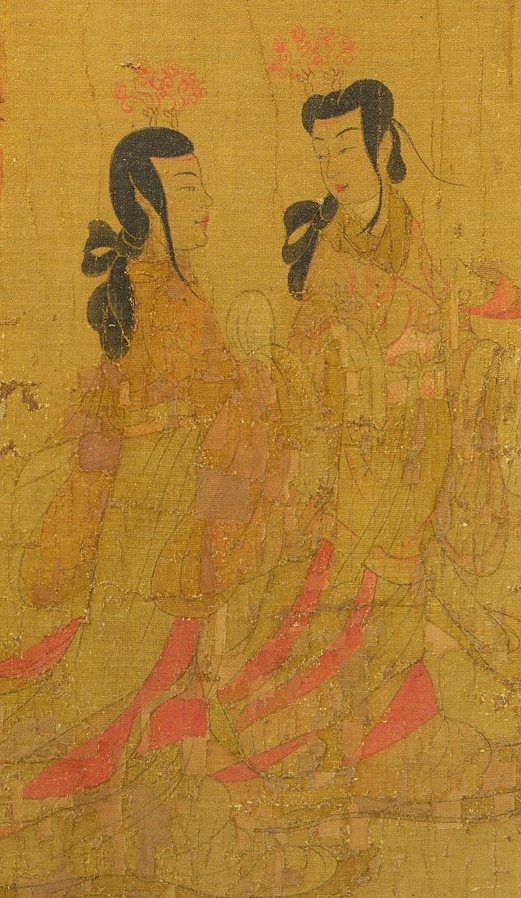
Court ladies from the Admonitions Scroll, attributed to Gu Kaizhi, c. 5th to 8th century

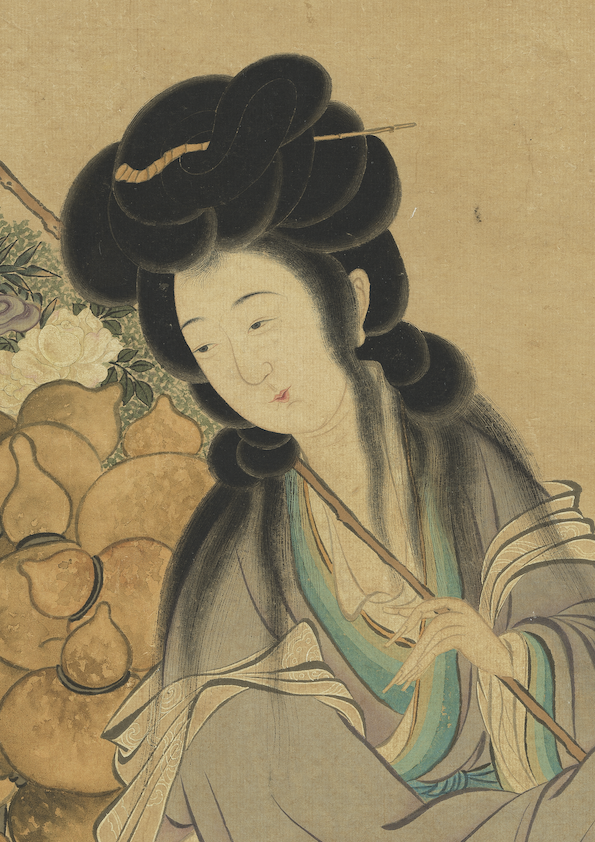
Taoist xian Magu, hanging scroll portrait, attributed to Ma Hezhi, c. 12th century

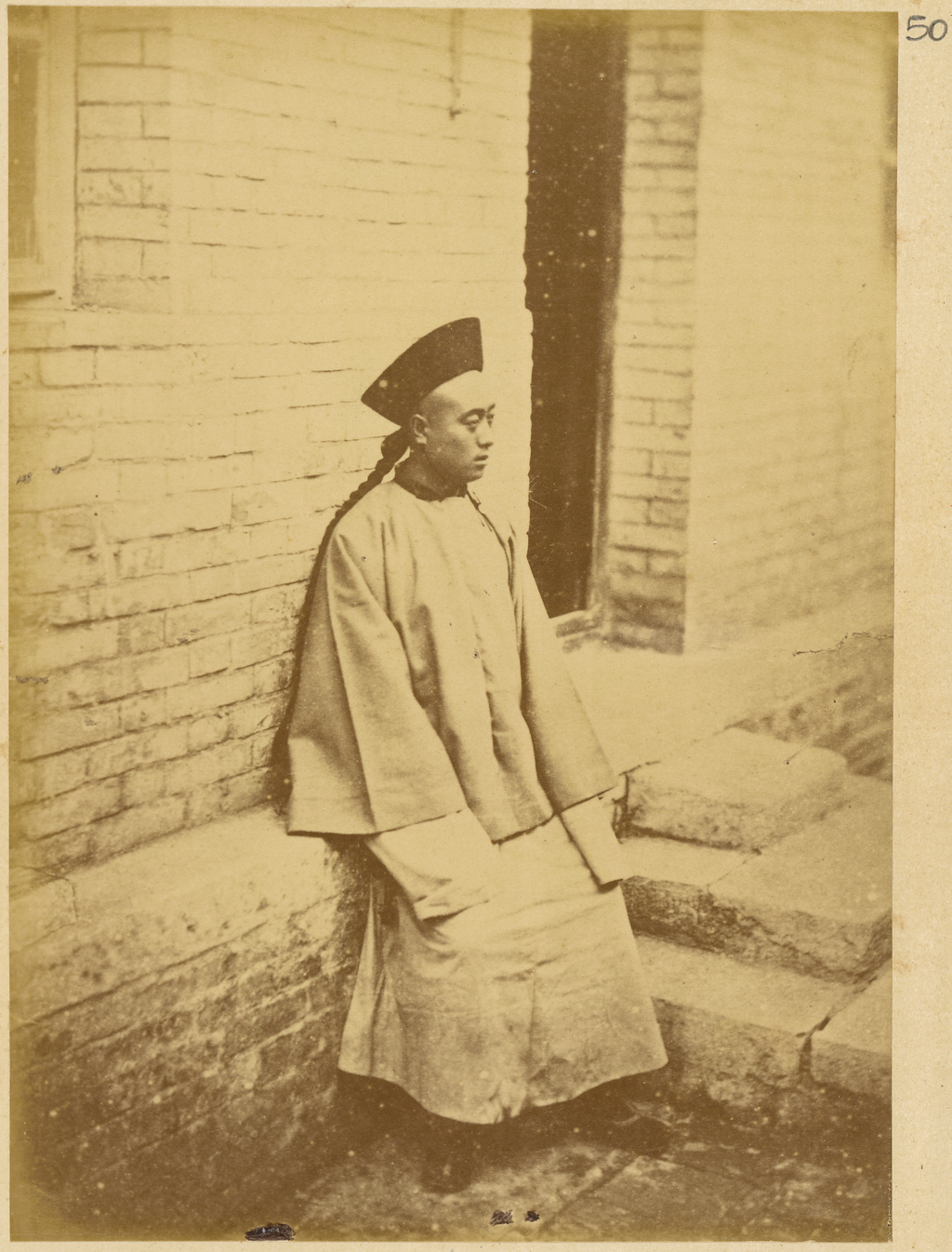
Chinese Orthodox Christian man with a queue, 1874

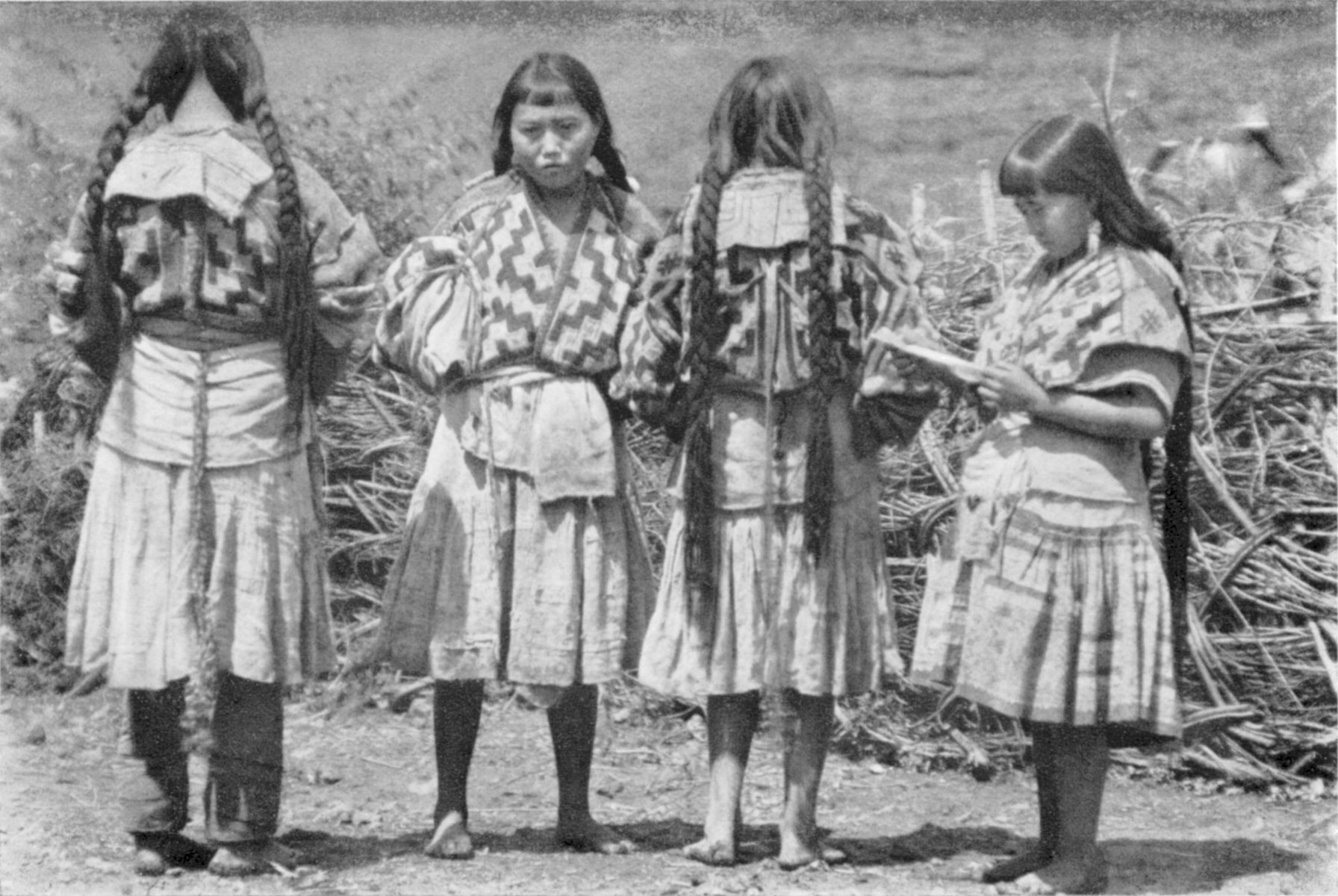
Yi girls in China, 1922

==== Japan ====
In medieval Japan, Heian period men were not very interested in a woman's physical beauty and rarely had an opportunity to see it. The only physical attribute of interest was a woman's hair, which had to be thick and longer than she was tall.

Japanese woman combing her long hair, color woodblock print by Hashiguchi Goyō, 1920

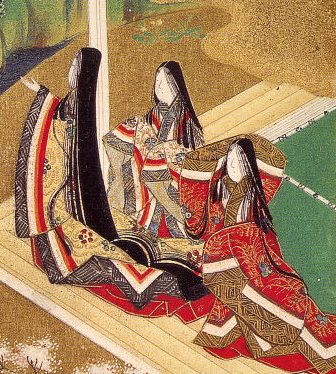
Court ladies with suberakashi from The Tale of Genji, painting by Tosa Mitsuoki, c. 17th century

==== Southeast Asia ====
In Southeast Asia and Indonesia, male long hair was valued until the 17th century, when the area adopted outside influences including Islam and Christianity. Invading cultures enforced shorter hairstyles on men as a sign of servitude, as well. They were also confused by the short hairstyles among women in certain areas, such as Thailand, and struggled to explain why women in the area had such short hair. They came up with several mythical stories, one of which involved a king who found a long hair in his rice and, in a rage, demanded that all women keep their hair short.

==== India ====
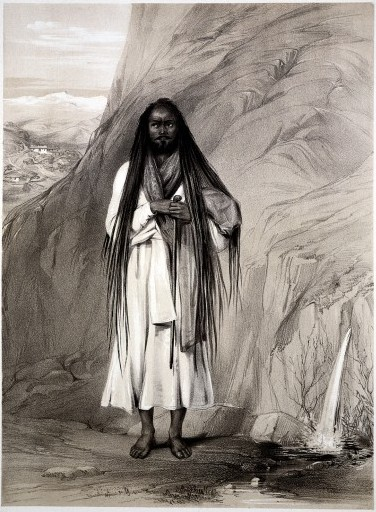
A Hindu "fakir" or sadhu with long hair, lithograph by Emily Eden after Lowes Cato Dickinson, 1844

In India, especially rural parts, girls and young women generally grow their hair very long, often reaching hip- or thigh-length. Long hair in India is considered an essential part of a woman.

== In religion ==
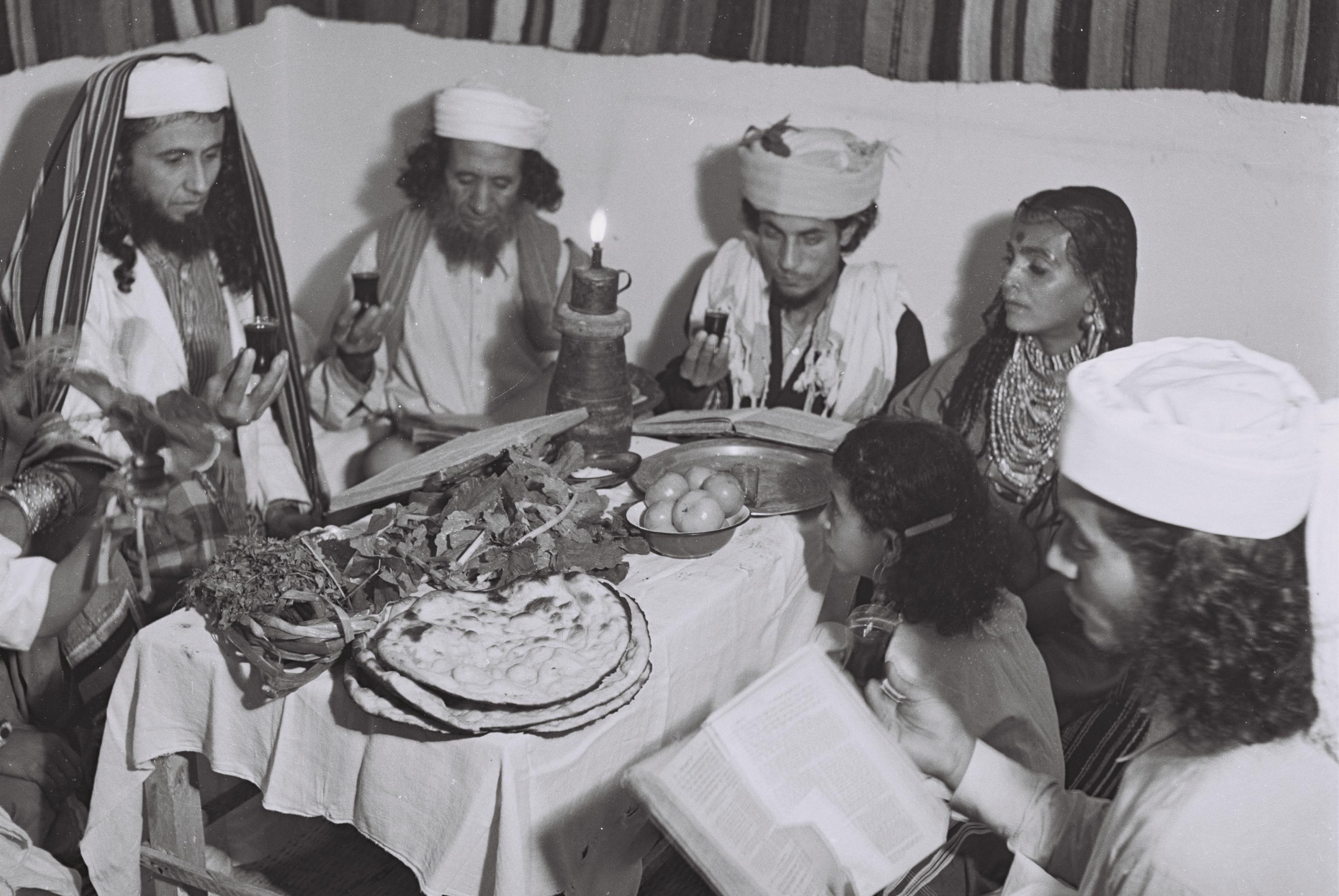
Habbani Jews tend to lengthen their hair.

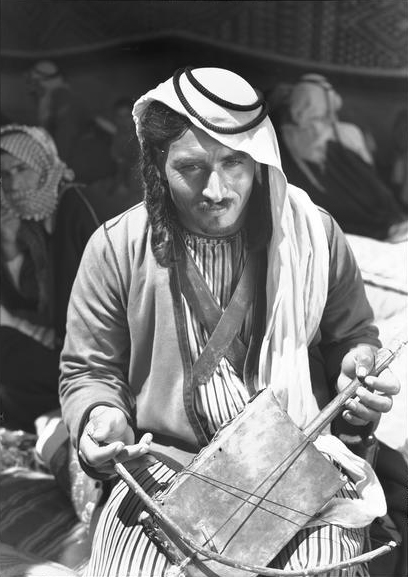
Bedouin with shoulder-length hair during World War II

Strict Orthodox Judaism forbids men from cutting their sidelocks, but other hair may be kept as desired. Hair is not cut during a time of mourning. In the past, Bedouin Muslims often wore their hair in long braids, but influences from the Western world have caused a change in attitudes. Bedouins are now less likely to have long hair. Islamic countries in North Africa such as Egypt view long hair in men as modernist and in one case the Egyptian police viewed it as Satanic and a sign of an infidel.

Muhammad is described in Sahih Muslim as having had hair that "hung over his shoulders and earlobes". Sahih Bukhari, regarded the most authentic of hadith, also supports this using a prime example of Isa (Jesus). Muhammad has also described Jesus as "having long hair reaching his ear lobes."

With regards to women, neither Qur'an nor Sunnah explicitly state that women cannot cut their hair. Hadith does mention that women should not imitate men, and vice versa, and hence many scholars on this assumption, decree that women should let their hair grow longer than the hair of Muhammad, reaching beyond their shoulders, as hadith mentions that Muhammad had his hair between his shoulder and his earlobes. However, according to some hadiths regarding the rules of awrah, women are required to grow hair long, long enough that it would cover the breasts or as much awrah parts of the body when they're being buried.

Some Muslims are also opposed to men having long hair as it is also important in Islam to have clear differences (in appearance) between sexes. Generally these cultures encourage women to have long hair and men to have short hair. The Taliban in Afghanistan viewed long hair for men as a Western influence, and punished it by arrest and forced haircuts, although this would be a direct contradiction of the sunnah of Muhammad. Similar measures have been taken by Islamists in Iraq. In spite of this, several Taliban affiliated members of the Mehsud clan are recognisable by their long hair. The Saudi Islamist fighter Amir Khattab was also notable for his long hair. Dervishes of some Sufi orders, such as the Kasnazani, often have long hair and whirl it around during rituals.

For Sikhs, Kesh is the practice of allowing one's hair to grow naturally as long hair is considered a hukam/command of Satguru/Saint.

== See also ==
- Beard and haircut laws by country
  - Let's trim our hair in accordance with the socialist lifestyle
  - Long hair in Singapore
- Dreadlocks
- Grooming
- Haircut
- Hair extensions
- Hair stick
- Lady Godiva
- List of hairstyles
- Locks of Love – charity that provides custom-made hair prosthetics from donated hair
- Long hair fetishism
- Rapunzel

== Bibliography ==
- Byrd, Ayana; Tharps, Lori (2002). Hair Story. New York: St. Martin's Griffin. ISBN 0-312-28322-9.
