= Hair theft =

Unlawful theft of human head hair

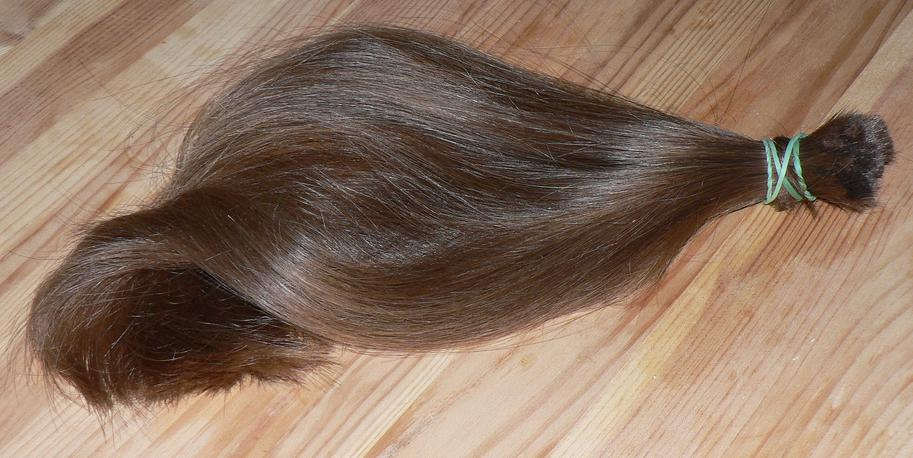
A cut-off ponytail represents a valuable commodity for hair thieves

Hair theft has been a recurrent problem in various parts of the world where human hair is in demand, either for commercial products such as wigs and hairpieces, or for sexual fetishes. As hair has a high commercial value – in the mid-19th century it was regarded as worth twice its weight in silver – opportunist thieves have targeted long-haired women, and less commonly men and children, with the aim of stealing their hair. Hair thieves have typically sought either to surreptitiously cut off hair in public places, or have mugged people and shorn their heads. The crime of hair theft has been widely reported in North America, Europe, Asia, and Australasia over the course of at least 300 years.

== Hair as a commodity ==
After a thousand-year abeyance, wigs came back into fashion in western Europe from the 16th century onwards, boosted in particular by King Louis XIV of France in the 17th and early 18th centuries. Hair came to be seen in Western countries as a means of publicly displaying the wearer's high status, and ability to engage in conspicuous consumption. A burgeoning trade in hair products included all the tools needed to maintain elaborate hairstyles – curling sticks, crimping irons, creams, soaps, oils, brushes, pins, and so on. The increasing ornateness of formal hairstyles required many to supplement their natural hair with extensions, or to use wigs instead, created by commercial wig-makers.

This created a highly profitable market in human hair, which was said in the mid-19th century to be worth twice its weight in silver. In 1851, 10,862 pounds (4,927 kg) of hair was imported from France to England, with a value of £3,621 (£101,388 today). The Hairdressers' Journal reported in May 1863, that a hundred tons of hair a year was being sold in Parisian markets. Not all hair was created equal; female hair from northern Italy and Spain was especially prized for its glossiness, black colour, and curly texture. It retailed at a price of 10–12 shillings per ounce (worth about £43/€50/$67 in 2013 prices), rising to £1 per ounce (about £87/€101/$136) for very long hair. A "hair harvest" was held annually in the poorer villages of Italy, where local girls sold their hair to wig-makers. One observer of a hair harvesting event reported seeing "several girls, sheared, one after the other like sheep, and as many more standing ready for the shears, with their caps in their hands, and their long hair combed out, and hanging down to their waists."

== Hair crime ==
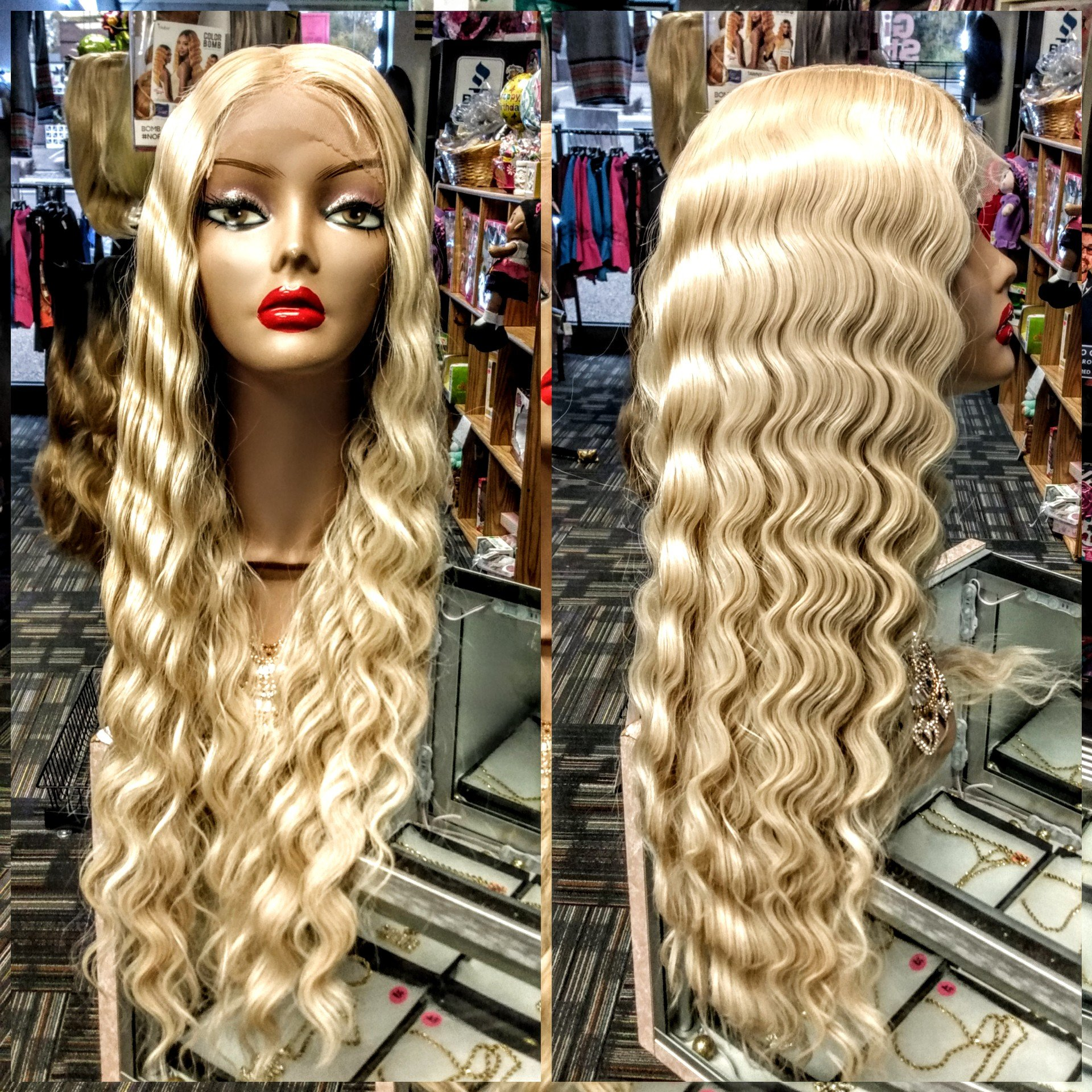
Female hair is in high demand by wig-makers; a full-length wig made from human hair can be worth hundreds of dollars

The value of human hair has meant that for several centuries, criminals have seen hair as worth stealing. As a result, women in a number of countries have found themselves at risk of being mugged, and their hair shorn off by hair thieves. As The Hairdressers' Journal put it in 1863, "Even in the present day, it has happened over and over again that a good crop of hair has been laid in wait for, and shorn from the trembling victim, who has been only too glad to get free with but the loss of her hair." An American newspaper reported in 1869 that demand for hair of unusual colours and shades was behind an outbreak of hair theft in New York City, where "the tresses dangling behind the head" were "easy prey." A few months later, a letter to The Times reported that hair thieves were at work in London too:

...infesting the thoroughfares and omnibuses of London and stealing hair. A young friend of ours has just had the whole of her hair cut off in broad daylight in Westbourne Grove... It is to be hoped that the police will really endeavour to put a stop to this serious nuisance, otherwise ladies will be afraid to walk in the streets.

It was not only women who were at risk. It was said that during the 18th century, the demand for hair in England was so great that in some places, children were forbidden to venture out alone, lest they fall victim to hair thieves. The Jacksonville Weekly Sentinel reported on 3 September 1869 that on their arrival at San Francisco, "eighty newly-arrived Chinamen had their handsome pig-tails cut off by hair thieves." The Evening Independent of St Petersburg, Florida reported in September 1913:

...hair thieves have appeared in the west. They enter homes in the night and cut the hair from the heads of sleeping women and children. They do not attempt to move their victims but cut only such hair as can be conveniently reached without awakening the sleepers. There seems to be an organized gang of these thieves. No attempt is made at any other form of robbery, the thieves leaving even watches and jewelry untouched.

Women in Wellington, New Zealand were targeted on the streets by an opportunist hair thief in 1914. According to a victim interviewed by the Grey River Argus, "For the life of me I couldn't tell you exactly when or where I lost my hair. I didn't feel anything at all [...] when opposite Te Aro House, my friend said: 'Oh, someone's cut your hair off!' I laughed and said it was nonsense, but I found it was only too true."

In more recent times, outbreaks of hair theft have been reported in several countries in south-east Asia, and in South America. A gang of Brazilian hair thieves consisting of "a fat man driving a small taxi, a boy about 14 and two women dressed as policewomen" were reported to have shorn the hair off 10 women in the municipality of Mogi das Cruzes near São Paulo in 1967. In 2007, women in Myanmar (Burma) fell victim to hair thieves who stole their hair on the street or while commuting. As many Myanmar women have very long hair, reaching to their waists or knees but worn in a ponytail, thieves found it easy to snip it off surreptitiously. The price of hair, at about $445 for 1.5 kilograms (3.3 lb), made it a profitable enterprise.

More outbreaks of hair theft occurred in Brazil in 2008, the victims including a woman in Aracaju, whose 1.5 m (4 ft 11 in)-long hair had not been cut in 20 years. In 2013, long-haired people in South Africa and Venezuela were also reported to be the target of gangs of hair thieves. A number of inhabitants of Johannesburg and Durban had their dreadlocks stolen by "hair jackers", carrying out "cut and runs" using anything from knives to shards of broken glass. The thieves' motivation was the high price of hair extensions, resulting from a new method of hairstyling known as "crocheting", that can give recipients an instant set of dreadlocks, which has produced intense competition for supplies of human hair.

A Venezuelan gang of hair thieves known as the Piranhas were reported to be operating in broad daylight in shopping malls in the city of Maracaibo. According to news reports, gang members, several of them female, are known to surround their victims, force them to pull their hair back into a ponytail, and then cut it off. As many as three cases a day were being reported in August 2013. The President of Venezuela, Nicolás Maduro, pledged to bring the Piranhas to justice: "We will capture these people, we will legislate to ban this crime. What sort of aggression is this? Our girls are sacred and we will apply the law with great force."

=== Sexual hair crime ===
Not all hair theft is motivated by commercial desire. Sexually motivated hair theft has also been reported – the work of hair fetishists known in the 19th century as "plait cutters" or "hair despoilers". They were said to cut off the braids or tresses of women or girls in public spaces, and to take their prizes home to be touched, caressed, and admired. Hair fetishists also collected commercially available hair products, blurring the distinction between sexual fetishism and a widespread 19th century consumer culture that endorsed "collecting, hoarding, displaying, desiring, fondling, possessing and continually looking."

In one case reported by The Hairdresser's Journal, a well-to-do German "hair fancier" was caught after a campaign of hair stealing, and was found to have an "immense number of beautiful locks [of hair]" in his home. The locks were arranged in a cabinet which resembled a museum, "together with all particulars of the fair one's name, age, place of residence, and station in life [...] in each carefully-placed packet containing a lock of ravished hair."

== See also ==
- Paraphilia
- The Rape of the Lock by Alexander Pope
