= Short hair =

Style of human haircutting

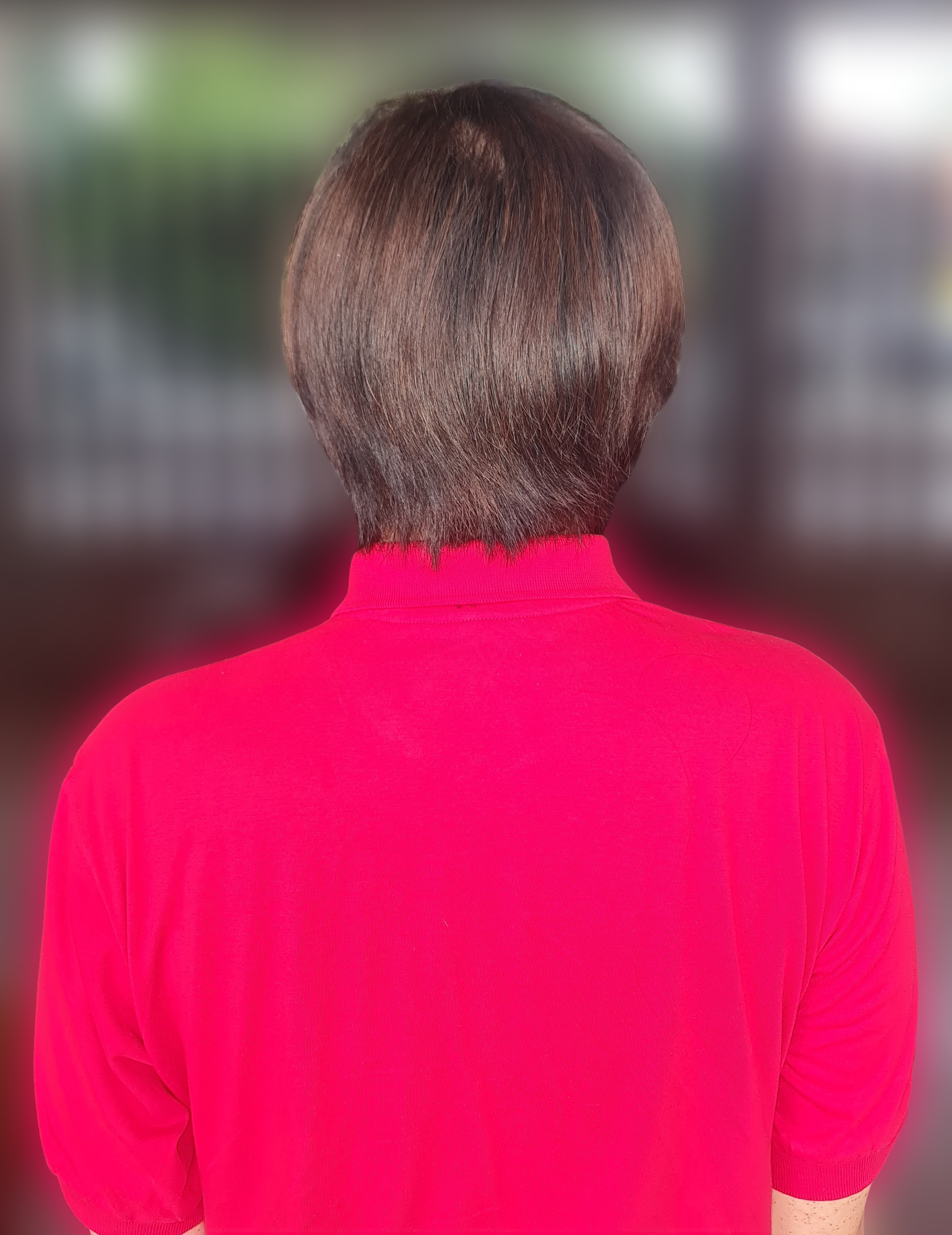
A young man with short hair

Short hair refers to any haircut with little length. It may vary from above the ears to below the chin. If a man's hair reaches the chin, it may not be considered short. For a woman, however, short varies from close-cropped to just above the shoulders. This varies from culture to culture, in more traditional societies in Eastern Europe, Asia, and the Islamic world, short hair on women means anything shorter than chest length with chest length to elbow length being considered medium-length. However, among more progressive societies with far less structured gender norms, the classic bob is considered medium-length with "short hair" referring to pixie cuts and similar hairstyles. Different styles of short hair include the bob cut, the crop and the pixie cut.

== Maintenance ==
Short hair is easier to care for than long hair. For this reason, many women cut their hair short to save time and the effort of maintaining it. However, it does take more time to be specifically styled than long hair.

Small-diameter brushes are generally recommended for maintaining short hair.

== Men ==
For men in Europe or European-settled areas, having short hair is now generally the norm (although longer hair is still not uncommon), despite long hair or wigs having been fashionable at various times in the past (including ancient Sparta, the 18th century, and the 1960s-80s).

In East Asia, the style is in a relativity recent development. Cultures within the Sinosphere generally preserved a tradition of growing out one's hair long without trimming, although it was typically worn tied up. The Qing dynasty required this to be cut into a queue, but it was not until the advent of the European colonial empires and the Republic of China that what is normally thought as short hair became popular for men.

== Women ==
Historically short hair has been the tradition for women in different cultures across the world. Women in some Amazonian tribes wear their hair short. Maasai women wear their hair cropped or shaved and long hair is the masculine norm. In Siam, modern day Thailand, women customarily wore their hair cropped.

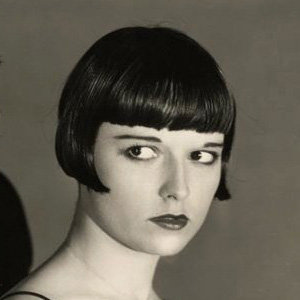
woman with short hair in 1929

Western culture

Short hair became fashionable for western women in the 1920s. Styles included the bob cut (a blunt cut to the chin or neck and cut evenly all around), the shingle bob (a haircut that was tapered short in the back) and the short crop (cut short in the back and longer hair in front). Before the 1920s, short hair on women was not entirely uncommon but was often associated with the Coney Island chorus girls. In the 1910s, Irene Castle was the first to bring short hair on women into the mainstream. Women wore longer styles in the 1930s and 1940s save for the early 1930s (as a continuation from the 1920s) but the bob became unfashionable by 1932. Short hair made a comeback when Audrey Hepburn sported a pixie cut (a very short wispy haircut) in the 1953 film Roman Holiday. Short hair was fairly popular throughout the 60s, but the 70s and 80s favored different hairstyles. It became popular in the 1990s and remains so to this day. During the 1990s among teenagers, girls and boys opted for similar haircuts. There have been other styles, such as the Eton crop (a more extreme take on the short crop), and short layers.

== See also ==
- List of hairstyles
