= 2007 FIFA Women's World Cup squads =

Association football tournament squads

This article lists all the confirmed national football squads for the 2007 FIFA Women's World Cup held in China between 10 and 30 September 2007. The 16 national teams involved in the tournament were required to register a squad of up to 21 players, including three goalkeepers. Only players in these squads were eligible to take part in the tournament.

== Group A ==
=== Argentina ===
Head coach: Carlos Borrello

No.	Pos.	Player	Date of birth (age)	Caps	Goals	Club
1	GK	Romina Ferro	26 June 1980 (aged 27)	10	0	(Argentine Football Association) Boca Juniors
2	DF	Eva González (captain)	2 September 1987 (aged 20)	18	3	(Argentine Football Association) Boca Juniors
3	DF	Valeria Cotelo	26 March 1984 (aged 23)	7	0	(Argentine Football Association) Boca Juniors
4	MF	Gabriela Chávez	9 April 1989 (aged 18)	11	0	(Argentine Football Association) Independiente
5	DF	Carmen Brusca	7 November 1985 (aged 21)	17	0	(Argentine Football Association) Boca Juniors
6	DF	Celeste Barbitta	22 May 1979 (aged 28)	1	0	(Argentine Football Association) Boca Juniors
7	FW	Ludmila Manicler	6 July 1987 (aged 20)	14	3	(Argentine Football Association) Independiente
8	MF	Clarisa Huber	22 December 1984 (aged 22)	10	0	(Argentine Football Association) Boca Juniors
9	FW	Natalia Gatti	20 October 1982 (aged 24)	17	0	(Argentine Football Association) Boca Juniors
10	FW	Emilia Mendieta	4 April 1988 (aged 19)	11	2	Unattached
11	MF	Rosana Gómez	12 July 1980 (aged 27)	16	0	(Argentine Football Association) Boca Juniors
12	GK	Vanina Correa	14 August 1983 (aged 24)	9	0	(Argentine Football Association) Renato Cesarini
13	MF	Florencia Quiñones	26 August 1986 (aged 21)	13	0	(Argentine Football Association) San Lorenzo
14	DF	Catalina Pérez	16 February 1989 (aged 18)	16	0	(Argentine Football Association) River Plate
15	MF	Florencia Mandrile	10 December 1988 (aged 18)	18	0	(Argentine Football Association) San Lorenzo
16	FW	Andrea Ojeda	17 January 1985 (aged 22)	8	0	(Argentine Football Association) Boca Juniors
17	FW	Fabiana Vallejos	30 July 1985 (aged 22)	10	0	(Argentine Football Association) Boca Juniors
18	FW	Belén Potassa	12 December 1988 (aged 18)	16	8	Unattached
19	FW	Analía Almeida	19 August 1985 (aged 22)	8	0	(Argentine Football Association) San Lorenzo
20	FW	Mercedes Pereyra	7 May 1987 (aged 20)	12	3	(Argentine Football Association) River Plate
21	GK	Elisabeth Minnig	6 January 1987 (aged 20)	12	0	Unattached

=== England ===
Head coach: Hope Powell

No.	Pos.	Player	Date of birth (age)	Caps	Goals	Club
1	GK	Rachel Brown	2 July 1980 (aged 27)	48	0	(The Football Association) Everton
2	DF	Alex Scott	14 December 1984 (aged 22)	33	6	(The Football Association) Arsenal
3	DF	Casey Stoney	13 May 1982 (aged 25)	49	2	(The Football Association) Chelsea
4	MF	Katie Chapman	15 June 1982 (aged 25)	61	5	(The Football Association) Arsenal
5	DF	Faye White (captain)	2 February 1978 (aged 29)	56	4	(The Football Association) Arsenal
6	DF	Mary Phillip	14 March 1977 (aged 30)	60	0	(The Football Association) Arsenal
7	MF	Karen Carney	1 August 1987 (aged 20)	31	5	(The Football Association) Arsenal
8	MF	Fara Williams	25 January 1984 (aged 23)	53	15	(The Football Association) Everton
9	FW	Eniola Aluko	21 February 1987 (aged 20)	26	4	(The Football Association) Chelsea
10	FW	Kelly Smith	29 October 1978 (aged 28)	65	21	(The Football Association) Arsenal
11	MF	Rachel Yankey	1 November 1979 (aged 27)	75	11	(The Football Association) Arsenal
12	DF	Anita Asante	27 April 1985 (aged 22)	24	1	(The Football Association) Arsenal
13	GK	Siobhan Chamberlain	15 August 1983 (aged 24)	6	0	(The Football Association) Chelsea
14	DF	Rachel Unitt	5 June 1982 (aged 25)	63	4	(The Football Association) Everton
15	MF	Sue Smith	24 November 1979 (aged 27)	64	14	(The Football Association) Leeds United
16	MF	Jill Scott	2 February 1987 (aged 20)	11	0	(The Football Association) Everton
17	FW	Jody Handley	12 March 1979 (aged 28)	30	5	(The Football Association) Everton
18	FW	Lianne Sanderson	3 February 1988 (aged 19)	7	1	(The Football Association) Arsenal
19	MF	Vicky Exley	22 October 1975 (aged 31)	52	6	(The Football Association) Doncaster Rovers Belles
20	DF	Lindsay Johnson	8 May 1980 (aged 27)	20	0	(The Football Association) Everton
21	GK	Carly Telford	7 July 1987 (aged 20)	1	0	(The Football Association) Leeds United

=== Germany ===
Head coach: Silvia Neid

No.	Pos.	Player	Date of birth (age)	Caps	Goals	Club
1	GK	Nadine Angerer	10 November 1978 (aged 28)	44	0	(German Football Association) FFC Turbine Potsdam
2	DF	Kerstin Stegemann	29 September 1977 (aged 29)	159	6	(German Football Association) Wattenscheid 09
3	DF	Saskia Bartusiak	9 September 1982 (aged 25)	2	0	(German Football Association) FSV Frankfurt
4	DF	Babett Peter	12 May 1988 (aged 19)	11	0	(German Football Association) FFC Turbine Potsdam
5	DF	Annike Krahn	1 July 1985 (aged 22)	25	0	(German Football Association) FCR Duisburg
6	MF	Linda Bresonik	7 December 1983 (aged 23)	27	2	(German Football Association) Essen-Schoenebeck
7	MF	Melanie Behringer	18 November 1985 (aged 21)	14	3	(German Football Association) SC Freiburg
8	FW	Sandra Smisek	3 July 1977 (aged 30)	115	27	(German Football Association) FFC Frankfurt
9	FW	Birgit Prinz (captain)	25 October 1977 (aged 29)	161	105	(German Football Association) FFC Frankfurt
10	MF	Renate Lingor	11 October 1975 (aged 31)	126	30	(German Football Association) FFC Frankfurt
11	FW	Anja Mittag	16 May 1985 (aged 22)	36	5	(German Football Association) FFC Turbine Potsdam
12	GK	Ursula Holl	26 June 1982 (aged 25)	2	0	(German Football Association) SC 07 Bad Neuenahr
13	DF	Sandra Minnert	7 April 1973 (aged 34)	137	15	(German Football Association) SC 07 Bad Neuenahr
14	MF	Simone Laudehr	12 July 1986 (aged 21)	0	0	(German Football Association) FCR Duisburg
15	DF	Sonja Fuss	5 November 1978 (aged 28)	48	3	(German Football Association) FCR Duisburg
16	FW	Martina Müller	18 April 1980 (aged 27)	57	25	(German Football Association) VfL Wolfsburg
17	DF	Ariane Hingst	25 July 1979 (aged 28)	130	9	(Swedish Football Association) Djurgårdens IF
18	MF	Kerstin Garefrekes	4 September 1979 (aged 28)	75	22	(German Football Association) FFC Frankfurt
19	MF	Fatmire Bajramaj	1 April 1988 (aged 19)	5	0	(German Football Association) FCR Duisburg
20	FW	Petra Wimbersky	9 November 1982 (aged 24)	62	15	(German Football Association) FFC Frankfurt
21	GK	Silke Rottenberg	25 January 1972 (aged 35)	123	0	(German Football Association) FFC Frankfurt

=== Japan ===
Head coach: Hiroshi Ohashi

No.	Pos.	Player	Date of birth (age)	Caps	Goals	Club
1	GK	Miho Fukumoto	2 October 1983 (aged 23)	28	0	(Japan Football Association) Okayama Yunogo Belle
2	DF	Hiromi Isozaki (captain)	22 December 1975 (aged 31)	102	4	(Japan Football Association) Tasaki Perule
3	DF	Yukari Kinga	2 May 1984 (aged 23)	14	0	(Japan Football Association) NTV Beleza
4	DF	Kyoko Yano	3 June 1984 (aged 23)	38	1	(Japan Football Association) Kanagawa University
5	MF	Miyuki Yanagita	11 April 1981 (aged 26)	73	11	(Japan Football Association) Urawa Reds Ladies
6	MF	Ayumi Hara	21 February 1979 (aged 28)	0	0	(Japan Football Association) INAC Leonessa
7	MF	Tomomi Miyamoto	31 December 1978 (aged 28)	72	13	(Japan Football Association) IGA FC Kunoichi
8	MF	Tomoe Sakai	27 May 1978 (aged 29)	105	7	(Japan Football Association) NTV Beleza
9	FW	Eriko Arakawa	30 October 1979 (aged 27)	49	17	(Japan Football Association) NTV Beleza
10	MF	Homare Sawa	6 September 1978 (aged 29)	125	65	(Japan Football Association) NTV Beleza
11	FW	Mio Otani	5 May 1979 (aged 28)	71	32	(Japan Football Association) Tasaki Perule
12	GK	Nozomi Yamago	16 January 1975 (aged 32)	58	0	(Japan Football Association) Urawa Reds Ladies
13	DF	Kozue Ando	9 July 1982 (aged 25)	49	7	(Japan Football Association) Urawa Reds Ladies
14	DF	Nayuha Toyoda	15 September 1986 (aged 20)	13	0	(Japan Football Association) NTV Beleza
15	DF	Azusa Iwashimizu	14 October 1986 (aged 20)	18	4	(Japan Football Association) NTV Beleza
16	MF	Aya Miyama	28 January 1985 (aged 22)	45	13	(Japan Football Association) Okayama Yunogo Belle
17	FW	Yūki Nagasato	15 July 1987 (aged 20)	30	18	(Japan Football Association) NTV Beleza
18	FW	Shinobu Ohno	23 January 1984 (aged 23)	41	18	(Japan Football Association) NTV Beleza
19	MF	Mizuho Sakaguchi	15 October 1987 (aged 19)	12	13	(Japan Football Association) Tasaki Perule
20	DF	Rumi Utsugi	5 December 1988 (aged 18)	12	0	(Japan Football Association) NTV Beleza
21	GK	Misaki Amano	22 April 1985 (aged 22)	0	0	(Japan Football Association) Waseda University

== Group B ==
=== Nigeria ===
Head coach: Ntiero Effiom

No.	Pos.	Player	Date of birth (age)	Caps	Goals	Club
1	GK	Precious Dede	18 January 1980 (aged 27)	12	0	(Nigeria Football Federation) Delta Queens FC
2	MF	Efioanwan Ekpo	25 January 1984 (aged 23)	20	3	(Nigeria Football Federation) Pelican Stars
3	DF	Ayisat Yusuf	6 March 1985 (aged 22)	30	0	(Football Association of Finland) NiceFutis
4	FW	Perpetua Nkwocha	3 January 1976 (aged 31)	13	10	(Swedish Football Association) Sunnanå SK
5	DF	Onome Ebi	8 May 1983 (aged 24)	2	0	(Nigeria Football Federation) Bayelsa Queens FC
6	MF	Gift Otuwe	15 July 1984 (aged 23)	0	0	(Nigeria Football Federation) Bayelsa Queens FC
7	FW	Stella Mbachu	16 April 1978 (aged 29)	55	25	(Chinese Football Association) Tianjin Teda F.C.
8	FW	Ifeanyi Chiejine	17 May 1983 (aged 24)	58	15	(Nigeria Football Federation) Bayelsa Queens FC
9	MF	Ogonna Chukwudi	14 September 1988 (aged 18)	0	0	(Nigeria Football Federation) Nasarawa Amazons
10	FW	Rita Chikwelu	6 March 1988 (aged 19)	2	0	(Football Association of Finland) United Pietarsaari
11	FW	Chi-Chi Igbo	1 May 1986 (aged 21)	0	0	(Danish Football Association) Fortuna Hjørring
12	GK	Tochukwu Oluehi	2 May 1987 (aged 20)	0	0	(Nigeria Football Federation) Bayelsa Queens FC
13	DF	Christie George (captain)	10 May 1984 (aged 23)	0	0	(Nigeria Football Federation) Pelican Stars
14	DF	Faith Ikidi	28 February 1987 (aged 20)	15	0	(Swedish Football Association) Linköpings FC
15	MF	Maureen Mmadu	7 May 1975 (aged 32)	68	0	(Swedish Football Association) Linköpings FC
16	DF	Ulunma Jerome	11 April 1988 (aged 19)	2	0	(Nigeria Football Federation) Rivers Angels
17	DF	Yinka Kudaisi	25 August 1975 (aged 32)	0	0	(Nigeria Football Federation) Pelican Stars
18	FW	Cynthia Uwak	15 July 1986 (aged 21)	2	0	(Swedish Football Association) Falköpings KIK
19	DF	Lilian Cole	1 August 1985 (aged 22)	12	0	(Nigeria Football Federation) Delta Queens FC
20	MF	Maureen Eke	19 December 1986 (aged 20)	3	0	(Nigeria Football Federation) Delta Queens FC
21	GK	Aladi Ayegba	25 June 1986 (aged 21)	0	0	(Football Association of Finland) Kokkolan Palloveikot

=== North Korea ===
Head coach: Kim Kwang-min

North Korea only named a squad of 20 players, leaving the number 13 shirt unassigned.

No.	Pos.	Player	Date of birth (age)	Caps	Goals	Club
1	GK	Phi Un-hui	2 August 1985 (aged 22)	2	0	(DPR Korea Football Association) Amrokgang
2	MF	Kim Kyong-hwa	28 March 1986 (aged 21)	2	0	(DPR Korea Football Association) 25 April
3	DF	Om Jong-ran	10 October 1985 (aged 21)	5	0	(DPR Korea Football Association) 25 April
4	DF	Yun Song-mi	28 January 1992 (aged 15)	1	0	(DPR Korea Football Association) Pyongyang City
5	DF	Song Jong-sun	11 March 1981 (aged 26)	10	0	(DPR Korea Football Association) Amrokgang
6	MF	Kim Ok-sim	2 July 1987 (aged 20)	2	1	(DPR Korea Football Association) Rimyongsu
7	MF	Ho Sun-hui	5 March 1980 (aged 27)	30	16	(DPR Korea Football Association) Amrokgang
8	FW	Kil Son-hui	7 March 1986 (aged 21)	2	0	(DPR Korea Football Association) Rimyongsu
9	MF	Ri Un-suk	1 January 1986 (aged 21)	2	0	(DPR Korea Football Association) 25 April
10	FW	Ri Kum-suk (captain)	16 August 1978 (aged 29)	65	40	(DPR Korea Football Association) 25 April
11	FW	Ho Un-byol	19 January 1992 (aged 15)	1	0	(DPR Korea Football Association) 25 April
12	MF	Ri Un-gyong	19 November 1980 (aged 26)	35	17	(DPR Korea Football Association) Rimyongsu
14	DF	Jang Yong-ok	17 September 1982 (aged 24)	1	0	(DPR Korea Football Association) 25 April
15	DF	Sonu Kyong-sun	28 September 1983 (aged 23)	5	0	(DPR Korea Football Association) 25 April
16	DF	Kong Hye-ok	19 July 1983 (aged 24)	5	0	(DPR Korea Football Association) 25 April
17	FW	Kim Yong-ae	7 March 1983 (aged 24)	3	6	(DPR Korea Football Association) 25 April
18	GK	Yun Hyon-hi	9 September 1992 (aged 15)	1	0	(DPR Korea Football Association) 25 April
19	FW	Jong Pok-sim	31 July 1985 (aged 22)	2	0	(DPR Korea Football Association) 25 April
20	DF	Hong Myong-gum	10 July 1986 (aged 21)	2	0	(DPR Korea Football Association) Amrokgang
21	GK	Jon Myong-hui	7 August 1986 (aged 21)	1	0	(DPR Korea Football Association) Rimyongsu

=== Sweden ===
Head coach: Thomas Dennerby

No.	Pos.	Player	Date of birth (age)	Caps	Goals	Club
1	GK	Hedvig Lindahl	29 April 1983 (aged 24)	21	0	(Swedish Football Association) Linköping FC
2	DF	Karolina Westberg	16 May 1978 (aged 29)	118	0	(Swedish Football Association) Umeå IK
3	DF	Stina Segerström	17 June 1982 (aged 25)	18	2	(Swedish Football Association) KIF Örebro DFF
4	DF	Hanna Marklund	26 November 1977 (aged 29)	113	6	(Swedish Football Association) Sunnanå SK
5	MF	Caroline Seger	19 March 1985 (aged 22)	31	3	(Swedish Football Association) Linköping FC
6	DF	Sara Thunebro	26 April 1979 (aged 28)	19	2	(Swedish Football Association) Djurgårdens IF
7	DF	Sara Larsson	13 May 1979 (aged 28)	69	6	(Swedish Football Association) Linköping FC
8	MF	Lotta Schelin	27 February 1984 (aged 23)	42	9	(Swedish Football Association) Kopparbergs/Göteborg FC
9	FW	Therese Lundin	3 March 1979 (aged 28)	49	8	(Swedish Football Association) Malmö FF
10	FW	Hanna Ljungberg	8 January 1979 (aged 28)	120	72	(Swedish Football Association) Umeå IK
11	FW	Victoria Svensson (captain)	18 May 1977 (aged 30)	137	58	(Swedish Football Association) Djurgårdens IF
12	GK	Sofia Lundgren	20 September 1982 (aged 24)	19	0	(Swedish Football Association) AIK
13	DF	Frida Östberg	10 December 1977 (aged 29)	57	2	(Swedish Football Association) Linköping FC
14	FW	Sara Johansson	23 January 1980 (aged 27)	24	7	(Swedish Football Association) Hammarby IF
15	MF	Therese Sjögran	8 April 1977 (aged 30)	113	11	(Swedish Football Association) Malmö FF
16	DF	Anna Paulson	29 February 1984 (aged 23)	10	0	(Swedish Football Association) Umeå IK
17	FW	Madelaine Edlund	15 September 1985 (aged 21)	1	0	(Swedish Football Association) Umeå IK
18	MF	Nilla Fischer	2 August 1984 (aged 23)	20	2	(Swedish Football Association) Malmö FF
19	DF	Charlotte Rohlin	2 December 1980 (aged 26)	4	1	(Swedish Football Association) Linköping FC
20	MF	Linda Forsberg	19 June 1985 (aged 22)	1	0	(Swedish Football Association) Djurgårdens IF
21	GK	Kristin Hammarström	29 March 1982 (aged 25)	0	0	(Swedish Football Association) KIF Örebro DFF

=== United States ===
Head coach: Greg Ryan

No.	Pos.	Player	Date of birth (age)	Caps	Goals	Club
1	GK	Briana Scurry	7 September 1971 (aged 36)	166	0	(United States Soccer Federation) Massachusetts
2	DF	Marian Dalmy	25 November 1984 (aged 22)	5	0	(United States Soccer Federation) Santa Clara
3	DF	Christie Rampone	24 June 1975 (aged 32)	175	4	(United States Soccer Federation) Monmouth
4	DF	Cat Whitehill	10 February 1982 (aged 25)	121	11	(United States Soccer Federation) New Jersey Wildcats
5	FW	Lindsay Tarpley	22 September 1983 (aged 23)	77	15	(United States Soccer Federation) UNC
6	FW	Natasha Kai	22 May 1983 (aged 24)	33	7	(United States Soccer Federation) Hawaii
7	MF	Shannon Boxx	29 June 1977 (aged 30)	75	15	(United States Soccer Federation) Notre Dame
8	DF	Tina Ellertson	20 May 1982 (aged 25)	29	0	(United States Soccer Federation) Washington
9	FW	Heather O'Reilly	2 January 1985 (aged 22)	70	12	(United States Soccer Federation) New Jersey Wildcats
10	MF	Aly Wagner	10 August 1980 (aged 27)	115	21	(United States Soccer Federation) Santa Clara
11	MF	Carli Lloyd	16 July 1982 (aged 25)	42	6	(United States Soccer Federation) Rutgers
12	MF	Leslie Osborne	27 May 1983 (aged 24)	50	2	(United States Soccer Federation) Santa Clara
13	MF	Kristine Lilly (captain)	22 July 1971 (aged 36)	338	128	(United States Soccer Federation) UNC
14	DF	Stephanie Lopez	3 April 1986 (aged 21)	30	0	(United States Soccer Federation) University of Portland
15	DF	Kate Markgraf	23 August 1976 (aged 31)	168	0	(United States Soccer Federation) Notre Dame
16	MF	Angela Hucles	5 July 1978 (aged 29)	68	5	(United States Soccer Federation) Virginia
17	MF	Lori Chalupny	29 January 1984 (aged 23)	51	6	(United States Soccer Federation) River Cities Futbol Club
18	GK	Hope Solo	30 July 1981 (aged 26)	52	0	(United States Soccer Federation) Washington
19	MF	Marci Jobson	4 December 1975 (aged 31)	16	0	(United States Soccer Federation) SMU
20	FW	Abby Wambach	2 June 1980 (aged 27)	103	85	(United States Soccer Federation) Florida
21	GK	Nicole Barnhart	10 October 1981 (aged 25)	3	0	(United States Soccer Federation) Stanford

== Group C ==
=== Australia ===
Head coach: (Scotland) Tom Sermanni

No.	Pos.	Player	Date of birth (age)	Caps	Goals	Club
1	GK	Melissa Barbieri	20 January 1980 (aged 27)	50	0	(Football Australia) Richmond SC
2	DF	Kate McShea	13 April 1983 (aged 24)	55	2	(Football Australia) Queensland Academy of Sport
3	MF	Alicia Ferguson	31 October 1981 (aged 25)	63	6	(Football Australia) Queensland Sting
4	DF	Dianne Alagich	12 May 1979 (aged 28)	74	3	(Football Australia) NSW Institute of Sport
5	DF	Cheryl Salisbury (captain)	8 March 1974 (aged 33)	135	33	(Football Australia) NSW Institute of Sport
6	DF	Rhian Davies	5 January 1981 (aged 26)	66	3	(Football Australia) NSW Institute of Sport
7	DF	Heather Garriock	21 December 1982 (aged 24)	93	13	(United States Soccer Federation) Adirondack Lynx
8	FW	Caitlin Munoz	4 October 1983 (aged 23)	31	12	(Football Australia) ACT Academy of Sport
9	FW	Sarah Walsh	11 January 1983 (aged 24)	45	23	(Football Australia) NSW Institute of Sport
10	MF	Joanne Peters	11 March 1979 (aged 28)	106	28	(Football Australia) NSW Institute of Sport
11	FW	Lisa De Vanna	14 November 1984 (aged 22)	44	13	(The Football Association) Doncaster Rovers Belles LFC
12	FW	Kate Gill	10 December 1984 (aged 22)	41	24	(Football Australia) NSW Institute of Sport
13	DF	Thea Slatyer	2 February 1983 (aged 24)	35	0	(Football Australia) NSW Institute of Sport
14	MF	Collette McCallum	26 March 1986 (aged 21)	31	6	(Football Australia) Western Waves
15	MF	Sally Shipard	20 October 1987 (aged 19)	32	2	(Football Australia) ACT Academy of Sport
16	MF	Lauren Colthorpe	25 October 1985 (aged 21)	13	1	(Football Australia) NSW Institute of Sport
17	MF	Danielle Small	7 February 1979 (aged 28)	41	9	(Football Australia) NSW Institute of Sport
18	GK	Lydia Williams	13 May 1988 (aged 19)	5	0	(Football Australia) ACT Academy of Sport
19	DF	Clare Polkinghorne	1 February 1989 (aged 18)	9	0	(Football Australia) Queensland Academy of Sport
20	FW	Joanne Burgess	23 September 1979 (aged 27)	27	4	(Football Australia) NSW Institute of Sport
21	GK	Emma Wirkus	11 January 1982 (aged 25)	7	0	(Football Australia) South Australian Institute of Sport

=== Canada ===
Head coach: (Norway) Even Pellerud

No.	Pos.	Player	Date of birth (age)	Caps	Goals	Club
1	GK	Karina LeBlanc	30 March 1980 (aged 27)	41	16	(United States Soccer Federation) New Jersey Wildcats
2	DF	Kristina Kiss	13 February 1981 (aged 26)	44	5	Unattached
3	DF	Melanie Booth	24 August 1984 (aged 23)	15	0	(Canadian Soccer Association) Toronto Lynx
4	DF	Robyn Gayle	31 October 1985 (aged 21)	15	0	(Canadian Soccer Association) Ottawa Fury
5	MF	Andrea Neil	26 October 1971 (aged 35)	130	22	(Canadian Soccer Association) Vancouver Whitecaps
6	DF	Tanya Dennis	26 August 1985 (aged 22)	12	0	(United States Soccer Federation) Nebraska Cornhuskers
7	FW	Rhian Wilkinson	12 May 1982 (aged 25)	6	3	(Canadian Soccer Association) Ottawa Fury
8	MF	Diana Matheson	16 April 1984 (aged 23)	29	1	(Canadian Soccer Association) Ottawa Fury
9	MF	Candace Chapman	21 April 1983 (aged 24)	21	1	(Canadian Soccer Association) Vancouver Whitecaps
10	DF	Martina Franko	13 January 1976 (aged 31)	24	0	(Canadian Soccer Association) Vancouver Whitecaps
11	DF	Randee Hermus	14 November 1979 (aged 27)	53	4	(Canadian Soccer Association) Vancouver Whitecaps
12	FW	Christine Sinclair (captain)	12 June 1983 (aged 24)	100	40	(Canadian Soccer Association) Vancouver Whitecaps
13	MF	Amy Walsh	13 September 1977 (aged 29)	0	0	(Canadian Soccer Association) Laval Comets
14	MF	Melissa Tancredi	27 December 1981 (aged 25)	7	0	(United States Soccer Federation) Atlanta Silverbacks
15	FW	Kara Lang	22 October 1986 (aged 20)	43	21	(Canadian Soccer Association) Vancouver Whitecaps
16	MF	Katie Thorlakson	14 January 1985 (aged 22)	1	0	(United States Soccer Federation) Notre Dame Fighting Irish
17	DF	Brittany Timko	5 September 1985 (aged 22)	28	9	(Canadian Soccer Association) Vancouver Whitecaps
18	GK	Erin McLeod	26 February 1983 (aged 24)	12	0	(Canadian Soccer Association) Vancouver Whitecaps
19	MF	Sophie Schmidt	28 June 1988 (aged 19)	1	0	(United States Soccer Federation) Atlanta Silverbacks
20	GK	Taryn Swiatek	4 February 1981 (aged 26)	14	0	(Canadian Soccer Association) Ottawa Fury
21	FW	Jodi-Ann Robinson	17 April 1989 (aged 18)	9	2	(Canadian Soccer Association) Vancouver Whitecaps

=== Ghana ===
Head coach: Isaac Paha

No.	Pos.	Player	Date of birth (age)	Caps	Goals	Club
1	GK	Gladys Enti	21 April 1975 (aged 32)	19	0	(Ghana Football Association) Ghatel Ladies
2	DF	Aminatu Ibrahim	3 January 1979 (aged 28)	8	0	(Ghana Football Association) Ghatel Ladies
3	DF	Mavis Danso	24 March 1984 (aged 23)	8	0	(United States Soccer Federation) Robert Morris College
4	MF	Doreen Awuah	12 December 1989 (aged 17)	0	0	(Ghana Football Association) Ghatel Ladies
5	DF	Patricia Ofori	9 June 1981 (aged 26)	8	0	(United States Soccer Federation) University of Alabama
6	MF	Florence Okoe	12 November 1984 (aged 22)	8	0	(Ghana Football Association) Ghatel Ladies
7	FW	Safia Abdul Rahman	5 May 1986 (aged 21)	0	0	(Ghana Football Association) Ghatel Ladies
8	MF	Sheila Okai	14 February 1979 (aged 28)	30	5	(Ghana Football Association) Ghatel Ladies
9	FW	Anita Amenuku	27 July 1985 (aged 22)	0	0	(Ghana Football Association) Ghatel Ladies
10	MF	Adjoa Bayor (captain)	17 May 1979 (aged 28)	30	5	(Ghana Football Association) Ghatel Ladies
11	FW	Gloria Foriwa	11 May 1981 (aged 26)	6	1	(Ghana Football Association) Ghatel Ladies
12	DF	Olivia Amoako	30 September 1985 (aged 21)	0	0	(Ghana Football Association) Ghatel Ladies
13	DF	Yaa Avoe	1 July 1982 (aged 25)	23	0	(Ghana Football Association) Ash Town Ladies
14	FW	Rumanatu Tahiru	4 June 1984 (aged 23)	0	0	(Ghana Football Association) Athleta Ladies
15	DF	Lydia Ankrah	1 December 1973 (aged 33)	14	0	(Ghana Football Association) Post Ladies
16	GK	Memunatu Sulemana	4 November 1977 (aged 29)	34	0	(Ghana Football Association) Post Ladies
17	DF	Hamdya Abass	1 August 1982 (aged 25)	7	0	(Ghana Football Association) Ghatel Ladies
18	FW	Anita Amankwa	2 September 1989 (aged 18)	0	0	(Ghana Football Association) Takoradi Ladies
19	GK	Fati Mohammed	4 June 1979 (aged 28)	13	0	(United States Soccer Federation) Robert Morris College
20	MF	Belinda Kanda	3 November 1982 (aged 24)	1	0	(United States Soccer Federation) University of Alabama
21	MF	Memuna Darku	17 April 1979 (aged 28)	0	0	(Ghana Football Association) Ghatel Ladies

=== Norway ===
Head coach: Bjarne Berntsen

No.	Pos.	Player	Date of birth (age)	Caps	Goals	Club
1	GK	Bente Nordby	23 July 1974 (aged 33)	164	0	(Swedish Football Association) Djurgårdens IF Dam
2	DF	Ane Stangeland Horpestad (captain)	2 June 1980 (aged 27)	80	2	(Norwegian Football Federation) Klepp
3	DF	Gunhild Følstad	3 November 1981 (aged 25)	50	1	(Norwegian Football Federation) Trondheims-Ørn SK
4	MF	Ingvild Stensland	3 August 1981 (aged 26)	49	1	(Swedish Football Association) Kopparbergs/Göteborg FC
5	DF	Siri Nordby	4 August 1978 (aged 29)	24	0	(Norwegian Football Federation) Røa IL
6	DF	Camilla Huse	31 August 1979 (aged 28)	18	0	(Norwegian Football Federation) Kolbotn IL
7	DF	Trine Rønning	14 June 1982 (aged 25)	75	15	(Norwegian Football Federation) Kolbotn IL
8	MF	Solveig Gulbrandsen	12 January 1981 (aged 26)	104	33	(Norwegian Football Federation) Kolbotn IL
9	FW	Isabell Herlovsen	23 June 1988 (aged 19)	24	2	(Norwegian Football Federation) Kolbotn IL
10	FW	Melissa Wiik	7 February 1985 (aged 22)	17	6	(Norwegian Football Federation) Asker SK
11	FW	Leni Larsen Kaurin	21 March 1981 (aged 26)	26	0	(Norwegian Football Federation) Asker SK
12	GK	Erika Skarbø	12 June 1987 (aged 20)	0	0	(Norwegian Football Federation) Arna-Bjørnar
13	GK	Christine Colombo Nilsen	30 April 1982 (aged 25)	2	0	(Norwegian Football Federation) Kolbotn IL
14	FW	Guro Knutsen	10 January 1985 (aged 22)	2	1	(Norwegian Football Federation) Røa IL
15	MF	Madeleine Giske	14 September 1987 (aged 19)	6	1	(Norwegian Football Federation) Arna-Bjørnar
16	FW	Ragnhild Gulbrandsen	22 February 1977 (aged 30)	73	23	(Norwegian Football Federation) Asker SK
17	FW	Lene Mykjåland	20 February 1987 (aged 20)	7	0	(Norwegian Football Federation) Røa IL
18	MF	Marie Knutsen	31 August 1982 (aged 25)	29	4	(Norwegian Football Federation) Røa IL
19	DF	Marit Fiane Christensen	11 December 1980 (aged 26)	46	6	(Norwegian Football Federation) Røa IL
20	FW	Lise Klaveness	19 April 1981 (aged 26)	47	5	(Swedish Football Association) Umeå IK
21	MF	Lene Storløkken	20 June 1981 (aged 26)	14	1	(Norwegian Football Federation) Team Strømmen FK

== Group D ==
=== Brazil ===
Head coach: Jorge Barcellos

No.	Pos.	Player	Date of birth (age)	Caps	Goals	Club
1	GK	Andréia	14 September 1977 (aged 29)	28	0	(Royal Spanish Football Federation) Transportes Alcaine
2	DF	Elaine	1 November 1982 (aged 24)	13	4	(Swedish Football Association) Umeå
3	DF	Aline (captain)	6 July 1982 (aged 25)	46	0	(Brazilian Football Confederation) CEUNSP Salto
4	DF	Tânia	10 March 1974 (aged 33)	33	3	(Brazilian Football Confederation) Saad
5	MF	Renata Costa	8 July 1986 (aged 21)	49	23	(Brazilian Football Confederation) Botucatu
6	DF	Rosana	7 July 1982 (aged 25)	16	0	(Austrian Football Association) SV Neulengbach
7	MF	Daniela	1 December 1984 (aged 22)	18	17	(Brazilian Football Confederation) Saad
8	MF	Formiga	3 March 1978 (aged 29)	25	9	(Brazilian Football Confederation) Saad
9	MF	Maycon	30 April 1977 (aged 30)	20	12	(Brazilian Football Confederation) Saad
10	FW	Marta	19 February 1986 (aged 21)	45	47	(Swedish Football Association) Umeå
11	FW	Cristiane	15 May 1985 (aged 22)	37	23	(German Football Association) VfL Wolfsburg
12	GK	Bárbara	4 July 1988 (aged 19)	12	2	(Brazilian Football Confederation) Sport Recife
13	DF	Mônica	4 April 1978 (aged 29)	7	2	(Brazilian Football Confederation) Botucatu
14	MF	Grazielle	28 April 1981 (aged 26)	0	0	(Brazilian Football Confederation) Botucatu
15	FW	Kátia	18 February 1977 (aged 30)	28	17	(French Football Federation) Lyon
16	DF	Simone	10 February 1981 (aged 26)	13	3	(French Football Federation) Lyon
17	DF	Daiane	15 April 1983 (aged 24)	0	0	(Brazilian Football Confederation) Botucatu
18	MF	Pretinha	19 May 1975 (aged 32)	15	3	(Japan Football Association) Leonessa
19	DF	Michele	10 June 1984 (aged 23)	8	1	(Brazilian Football Confederation) Botucatu
20	MF	Ester	12 September 1982 (aged 24)	8	0	(Brazilian Football Confederation) CEPE-Caxias
21	GK	Thaís	19 June 1987 (aged 20)	2	0	(Brazilian Football Confederation) São Caetano

=== China ===
Head coach: (Sweden) Marika Domanski-Lyfors

No.	Pos.	Player	Date of birth (age)	Caps	Goals	Club
1	GK	Zhang Yanru	10 January 1987 (aged 20)	21	0	(Chinese Football Association) Jiangsu Shuntian
2	DF	Weng Xinzhi	15 June 1988 (aged 19)	22	0	(Chinese Football Association) Jiangsu Shuntian
3	DF	Li Jie	8 July 1979 (aged 28)	191	10	(Chinese Football Association) Beijing Chengjian
4	MF	Wang Kun	20 October 1985 (aged 21)	47	5	(Chinese Football Association) Hebei Huabei
5	MF	Song Xiaoli	21 July 1981 (aged 26)	10	1	(Chinese Football Association) Jiangsu Shuntian
6	MF	Xie Caixia	17 February 1976 (aged 31)	11	1	(Chinese Football Association) Guangdong Xiongying
7	MF	Bi Yan (captain)	17 February 1984 (aged 23)	97	10	(Chinese Football Association) Dalian Shide
8	FW	Pan Lina	18 July 1977 (aged 30)	135	5	(Chinese Football Association) Shanghai Shenhua
9	FW	Han Duan	15 June 1983 (aged 24)	129	95	(Chinese Football Association) Dalian Shide
10	FW	Ma Xiaoxu	5 June 1988 (aged 19)	25	8	(Chinese Football Association) Dalian Shide
11	DF	Pu Wei	20 August 1980 (aged 27)	154	35	(Chinese Football Association) Inter Shanghai
12	MF	Qu Feifei	18 May 1982 (aged 25)	88	20	(Chinese Football Association) Bayi
13	MF	Li Dongna	6 December 1988 (aged 18)	10	0	(Chinese Football Association) Tianjin Teda
14	FW	Zhang Ouying	2 November 1975 (aged 31)	105	21	(Chinese Football Association) Hebei Huabei
15	DF	Zhou Gaoping	20 October 1986 (aged 20)	12	0	(Chinese Football Association) Jiangsu Shuntian
16	DF	Liu Yali	9 June 1980 (aged 27)	141	0	(Chinese Football Association) Hebei Huabei
17	FW	Liu Sa	11 July 1987 (aged 20)	10	2	(Chinese Football Association) Beijing Chenjian
18	GK	Han Wenxia	23 August 1976 (aged 31)	90	0	(Chinese Football Association) Dalian Shide
19	DF	Zhang Ying	27 June 1985 (aged 22)	61	4	(Chinese Football Association) Shanghai Shenhua
20	MF	Zhang Tong	3 April 1984 (aged 23)	31	2	(Chinese Football Association) Beijing Chenjian
21	GK	Xu Meishuang	28 May 1986 (aged 21)	3	0	(Chinese Football Association) Changchun Yatai

=== Denmark ===
Head coach: Kenneth Heiner-Møller

No.	Pos.	Player	Date of birth (age)	Caps	Goals	Club
1	GK	Heidi Johansen	9 June 1983 (aged 24)	41	0	(Danish Football Association) Fortuna Hjørring
2	DF	Mia Olsen	15 October 1981 (aged 25)	24	0	(Danish Football Association) Brøndby IF
3	MF	Katrine Pedersen (captain)	13 April 1977 (aged 30)	125	4	(Norwegian Football Federation) Asker S.K.
4	DF	Gitte Andersen	28 April 1977 (aged 30)	72	1	(Danish Football Association) Brøndby IF
5	DF	Bettina Falk	31 March 1981 (aged 26)	40	0	(Danish Football Association) Brøndby IF
6	MF	Louise Hansen	4 May 1975 (aged 32)	96	5	(German Football Association) 1. FFC Frankfurt
7	MF	Cathrine Paaske Sørensen	14 June 1978 (aged 29)	76	19	(Danish Football Association) Brøndby IF
8	MF	Julie Rydahl Bukh	9 January 1982 (aged 25)	42	4	(Danish Football Association) Brøndby IF
9	FW	Maiken Pape	20 February 1978 (aged 29)	15	7	(Danish Football Association) Brøndby IF
10	MF	Anne Dot Eggers Nielsen	6 November 1975 (aged 31)	110	25	(Danish Football Association) Brøndby IF
11	FW	Merete Pedersen	30 June 1973 (aged 34)	115	53	(Danish Football Association) Odense
12	MF	Stine Dimun	15 October 1979 (aged 27)	26	3	(Danish Football Association) Brøndby IF
13	FW	Johanna Rasmussen	2 July 1983 (aged 24)	37	6	(Danish Football Association) Fortuna Hjørring
14	DF	Dorte Dalum Jensen	3 July 1978 (aged 29)	40	1	(Swedish Football Association) Djurgårdens IF Dam
15	MF	Mariann Gajhede Knudsen	16 November 1984 (aged 22)	33	0	(Danish Football Association) Fortuna Hjørring
16	GK	Tine Cederkvist	21 March 1979 (aged 28)	44	0	(Danish Football Association) Brøndby IF
17	MF	Janne Madsen	12 March 1978 (aged 29)	46	4	(Danish Football Association) Fortuna Hjørring
18	DF	Christina Ørntoft	2 July 1985 (aged 22)	20	0	(Danish Football Association) Skovlunde
19	MF	Line Røddik Hansen	31 January 1988 (aged 19)	9	0	(Danish Football Association) Brøndby IF
20	MF	Camilla Sand Andersen	14 February 1986 (aged 21)	7	1	(Danish Football Association) Fortuna Hjørring
21	GK	Susanne Graversen	8 November 1984 (aged 22)	1	0	(Danish Football Association) Skovbakken IK

=== New Zealand ===
Head coach: (England) John Herdman

No.	Pos.	Player	Date of birth (age)	Caps	Goals	Club
1	GK	Jenny Bindon	25 February 1973 (aged 34)	12	0	(New Zealand Football) Three Kings United
2	MF	Ria Percival	7 December 1989 (aged 17)	12	2	(New Zealand Football) Lynn-Avon United
3	DF	Hannah Bromley	15 November 1986 (aged 20)	4	0	(United States Soccer Federation) Soccerplus Connecticut
4	MF	Katie Hoyle	1 February 1988 (aged 19)	9	0	(New Zealand Football) Lynn-Avon United
5	DF	Abby Erceg	20 November 1989 (aged 17)	12	2	(New Zealand Football) Western Springs AFC
6	DF	Rebecca Smith (captain)	17 June 1981 (aged 26)	21	2	(Swedish Football Association) Sunnanå SK
7	FW	Zoe Thompson	16 September 1983 (aged 23)	10	2	(New Zealand Football) Three Kings United
8	MF	Hayley Moorwood	13 February 1984 (aged 23)	20	2	(New Zealand Football) Lynn-Avon United
9	FW	Wendi Henderson	16 July 1971 (aged 36)	55	16	(New Zealand Football) Upper Hutt City FC
10	MF	Annalie Longo	1 July 1991 (aged 16)	7	0	(New Zealand Football) Three Kings United
11	DF	Marlies Oostdam	29 July 1977 (aged 30)	21	0	(New Zealand Football) Eastern Suburbs AFC
12	GK	Stephanie Puckrin	22 August 1979 (aged 28)	1	0	(New Zealand Football) Lynn-Avon United
13	DF	Ali Riley	30 October 1987 (aged 19)	8	0	(United States Soccer Federation) Stanford University
14	MF	Simone Ferrara	7 June 1977 (aged 30)	18	7	(United States Soccer Federation) Ajax America
15	DF	Maia Jackman	25 May 1975 (aged 32)	37	11	(New Zealand Football) Western Springs AFC
16	MF	Emma Humphries	14 June 1986 (aged 21)	5	0	(United States Soccer Federation) Cocoa Expos
17	FW	Rebecca Tegg	18 December 1985 (aged 21)	3	0	(New Zealand Football) Eastern Suburbs AFC
18	MF	Priscilla Duncan	19 May 1983 (aged 24)	15	1	(New Zealand Football) Western Springs AFC
19	MF	Emily McColl	1 November 1985 (aged 21)	6	0	(United States Soccer Federation) Cocoa Expos
20	FW	Merissa Smith	11 November 1990 (aged 16)	6	0	(New Zealand Football) Three Kings United
21	GK	Rachel Howard	30 November 1977 (aged 29)	12	0	(German Football Association) TSV Crailsheim
