= Football at the 2008 Summer Olympics – Women's team squads =

The women's football tournament at the 2008 Summer Olympics in Beijing was held from 6 to 21 August 2008. The women's tournament was a full international tournament with no restrictions on age. The twelve national teams involved in the tournament were required to register a squad of 18 players, including two goalkeepers. Additionally, teams could name a maximum of four alternate players, numbered from 19 to 22. The alternate list could contain at most three outfielders, as at least one slot was reserved for a goalkeeper. In the event of serious injury during the tournament, an injured player could be replaced by one of the players in the alternate list. Only players in these squads were eligible to take part in the tournament.

The age listed for each player is on 6 August 2008, the first day of the tournament. The numbers of caps and goals listed for each player do not include any matches played after the start of the tournament. The club listed is the club for which the player last played a competitive match prior to the tournament. A flag is included for coaches who are of a different nationality than their own national team.

== Group E ==
=== Argentina ===
Head coach: Carlos Borrello

Argentina named a squad of 18 players and 4 alternates for the tournament.

No.	Pos.	Player	Date of birth (age)	Caps	Goals	Club
1	GK	Guadalupe Calello	13 April 1990 (aged 18)			(Argentine Football Association) River Plate
2	DF	Eva González	2 September 1987 (aged 20)			(Argentine Football Association) Boca Juniors
3	DF	Yesica Arrien	1 July 1980 (aged 28)			(Argentine Football Association) Estudiantes de La Plata
4	MF	Florencia Mandrile	10 February 1988 (aged 20)			(Argentine Football Association) San Lorenzo de Almagro
5	DF	Marisa Gerez (captain)	3 November 1976 (aged 31)			(Argentine Football Association) Boca Juniors
6	DF	Gabriela Chávez	9 April 1989 (aged 19)			(Argentine Football Association) Independiente
7	FW	Ludmila Manicler	6 July 1987 (aged 21)			(Argentine Football Association) Independiente
8	FW	Emilia Mendieta	4 February 1988 (aged 20)			(Argentine Football Association) River Plate
9	FW	Belén Potassa	12 December 1988 (aged 19)			(Argentine Football Association) San Lorenzo de Almagro
10	MF	Mariela Coronel	20 June 1981 (aged 27)			(Royal Spanish Football Federation) Prainsa Zaragoza
11	MF	Fabiana Vallejos	30 July 1985 (aged 23)			(Argentine Football Association) Boca Juniors
12	DF	Daiana Cardone	1 January 1989 (aged 19)			(Argentine Football Association) Independiente
13	MF	Florencia Quiñones	26 August 1986 (aged 21)			(Argentine Football Association) San Lorenzo de Almagro
14	FW	Andrea Ojeda	17 January 1985 (aged 23)			(Argentine Football Association) Boca Juniors
15	FW	Mercedes Pereyra	7 May 1987 (aged 21)			(Argentine Football Association) River Plate
16	MF	Gimena Blanco	5 December 1987 (aged 20)			(Argentine Football Association) River Plate
17	FW	Analía Almeida	19 August 1985 (aged 22)			(Argentine Football Association) San Lorenzo de Almagro
18	GK	Vanina Correa	14 August 1983 (aged 24)			(Argentine Football Association) Boca Juniors

Unenrolled alternate players
No.	Pos.	Player	Date of birth (age)	Caps	Goals	Club
19	DF	Valeria Cotelo	26 March 1984 (aged 24)			
20	DF	Ruth Leiva	28 June 1988 (aged 20)			
21	FW	Natalia Gatti	20 October 1982 (aged 25)			
22	GK	Elisabeth Minning	6 January 1987 (aged 21)			

=== Canada ===
Head coach: (Norway) Even Pellerud

Canada named a squad of 18 players and 4 alternates for the tournament. Prior to the tournament, Amber Allen withdrew injured and was replaced on 3 August 2008 by Jodi-Ann Robinson, who was initially selected as an alternate player. Chelsea Stewart subsequently filled the vacant alternate spot.

No.	Pos.	Player	Date of birth (age)	Caps	Goals	Club
1	GK	Karina LeBlanc	30 March 1980 (aged 28)	62	0	(United States Soccer Federation) New Jersey Wildcats
2	FW	Jodi-Ann Robinson	17 April 1989 (aged 19)	27	4	(Canadian Soccer Association) Vancouver Whitecaps
3	DF	Emily Zurrer	12 July 1987 (aged 21)	8	0	(Canadian Soccer Association) Vancouver Whitecaps
4	MF	Clare Rustad	27 April 1983 (aged 25)	39	1	(United States Soccer Federation) University of Washington
5	DF	Robyn Gayle	31 October 1985 (aged 22)	23	0	(Canadian Soccer Association) Ottawa Fury
6	MF	Sophie Schmidt	28 June 1988 (aged 20)	38	3	(Canadian Soccer Association) Vancouver Whitecaps
7	MF	Rhian Wilkinson	12 May 1982 (aged 26)	62	7	(Canadian Soccer Association) Ottawa Fury
8	MF	Diana Matheson	6 April 1984 (aged 24)	81	4	(Canadian Soccer Association) Ottawa Fury
9	DF	Candace Chapman	2 April 1983 (aged 25)	57	4	(Canadian Soccer Association) Vancouver Whitecaps
10	DF	Martina Franko	13 January 1976 (aged 32)	46	5	(Canadian Soccer Association) Vancouver Whitecaps
11	DF	Randee Hermus	14 November 1979 (aged 28)	110	11	(Canadian Soccer Association) Vancouver Whitecaps
12	FW	Christine Sinclair (captain)	12 June 1983 (aged 25)	120	92	(Canadian Soccer Association) Vancouver Whitecaps
13	MF	Amy Walsh	13 September 1977 (aged 30)	94	5	(Canadian Soccer Association) Laval Comets
14	FW	Melissa Tancredi	27 December 1981 (aged 26)	33	6	(United States Soccer Federation) Atlanta Silverbacks
15	FW	Kara Lang	22 October 1986 (aged 21)	80	31	(United States Soccer Federation) UCLA
16	FW	Jonelle Filigno	24 September 1990 (aged 17)	15	1	(United States Soccer Federation) Rutgers University
17	MF	Brittany Timko	5 September 1985 (aged 22)	86	2	(Canadian Soccer Association) Vancouver Whitecaps
18	GK	Erin McLeod	26 February 1983 (aged 25)	35	0	(Canadian Soccer Association) Vancouver Whitecaps

Unenrolled alternate players
No.	Pos.	Player	Date of birth (age)	Caps	Goals	Club
19–21	MF	Kristina Kiss	13 February 1981 (aged 27)			
19–21	DF	Chelsea Stewart	28 April 1990 (aged 18)			
19–21	FW	Amy Vermeulen	23 November 1983 (aged 24)			
22	GK	Stephanie Labbé	10 October 1986 (aged 21)			

=== China PR ===
Head coach: Shang Ruihua

China PR named a squad of 18 players and 4 alternates for the tournament.

No.	Pos.	Player	Date of birth (age)	Caps	Goals	Club
1	GK	Zhang Yanru	10 January 1987 (aged 21)	35	0	(Chinese Football Association) Jiangsu Huatai
2	DF	Yuan Fan	6 November 1986 (aged 21)	31	0	(Chinese Football Association) Shanghai Shenhua
3	DF	Li Jie (captain)	8 July 1979 (aged 29)	196	12	(Chinese Football Association) Beijing Zhaotai
4	DF	Zhang Ying	27 June 1985 (aged 23)	85	4	(Chinese Football Association) Shanghai Shenhua
5	DF	Weng Xinzhi	15 June 1988 (aged 20)	30	0	(Chinese Football Association) Jiangsu Huatai
6	MF	Zhang Na	10 March 1984 (aged 24)	30	1	(Chinese Football Association) Hebei Huabei
7	MF	Bi Yan	17 February 1984 (aged 24)	140	12	(Chinese Football Association) Dalian Haichang
8	FW	Xu Yuan	17 November 1985 (aged 22)	25	6	(Chinese Football Association) Gansu Tianma
9	FW	Han Duan	15 June 1983 (aged 25)	160	100	(Chinese Football Association) Dalian Haichang
10	FW	Liu Sa	11 July 1987 (aged 21)	25	4	(Chinese Football Association) Beijing Zhaotai
11	DF	Pu Wei	20 August 1980 (aged 27)	200	35	(Chinese Football Association) Shanghai Shenhua
12	MF	Lou Jiahui	26 May 1991 (aged 17)	0	0	(Chinese Football Association) Henan Jianye
13	DF	Jiang Shuai	7 June 1982 (aged 26)	15	1	(Chinese Football Association) Tianjin Huisen
14	DF	Liu Huana	17 May 1981 (aged 27)	50	2	(Chinese Football Association) Shaanxi Guoli
15	DF	Zhou Gaoping	20 October 1986 (aged 21)	28	0	(Chinese Football Association) Jiangsu Huatai
16	MF	Wang Dandan	1 May 1985 (aged 23)	25	4	(Chinese Football Association) Beijing Chengjiang
17	MF	Gu Yasha	28 November 1990 (aged 17)	0	0	(Chinese Football Association) Beijing Chengjiang
18	GK	Han Wenxia	23 August 1976 (aged 31)	93	0	(Chinese Football Association) Dalian Haichang

Unenrolled alternate players
No.	Pos.	Player	Date of birth (age)	Caps	Goals	Club
19	MF	Lou Xiaoxu	30 May 1986 (aged 22)			
20	DF	Wang Kun	20 October 1985 (aged 22)			
21	MF	Xie Caixia	17 February 1976 (aged 32)			
22	GK	Weng Xiaojie	27 July 1987 (aged 21)			

=== Sweden ===
Head coach: Thomas Dennerby

Sweden named a squad of 18 players and 4 alternates for the tournament. During the tournament, Maria Aronsson replaced Josefine Öqvist on 12 August 2008 due to injury.

No.	Pos.	Player	Date of birth (age)	Caps	Goals	Club
1	GK	Hedvig Lindahl	29 April 1983 (aged 25)	34	0	(Swedish Football Association) Linköping
2	DF	Karolina Westberg	16 May 1978 (aged 30)	126	2	(Swedish Football Association) Umeå
3	DF	Stina Segerström	17 June 1983 (aged 25)	27	2	(Swedish Football Association) Örebro
4	DF	Anna Paulson	29 February 1984 (aged 24)	23	0	(Swedish Football Association) Umeå
5	MF	Caroline Seger	19 March 1985 (aged 23)	43	4	(Swedish Football Association) Linköping
6	DF	Sara Thunebro	26 April 1979 (aged 29)	32	2	(Swedish Football Association) Djurgårdens IF
7	DF	Sara Larsson	6 February 1987 (aged 21)	77	7	(Swedish Football Association) Linköping
8	FW	Lotta Schelin	27 February 1984 (aged 24)	52	19	(Swedish Football Association) Göteborg
9	FW	Jessica Landström	12 December 1984 (aged 23)	13	4	(Swedish Football Association) Linköping
10	FW	Johanna Almgren	22 March 1984 (aged 24)	15	0	(Swedish Football Association) Göteborg
11	FW	Victoria Sandell Svensson (captain)	18 May 1977 (aged 31)	149	64	(Swedish Football Association) Djurgårdens IF
12	GK	Caroline Jönsson	22 November 1977 (aged 30)	79	0	(Swedish Football Association) Malmö
13	DF	Frida Östberg	10 December 1977 (aged 30)	73	2	(Swedish Football Association) Umeå
14	MF	Josefine Öqvist	23 July 1983 (aged 25)	48	10	(Swedish Football Association) Linköping
15	MF	Therese Sjögran	8 April 1977 (aged 31)	127	11	(Swedish Football Association) Malmö
16	MF	Linda Forsberg	19 June 1985 (aged 23)	5	0	(Swedish Football Association) Djurgårdens IF
17	DF	Charlotte Rohlin	2 December 1980 (aged 27)	11	1	(Swedish Football Association) Linköping
18	MF	Nilla Fischer	2 August 1984 (aged 24)	35	4	(Swedish Football Association) Malmö
19	FW	Maria Aronsson	23 December 1983 (aged 24)	15	1	(Swedish Football Association) Malmö

Unenrolled alternate players
No.	Pos.	Player	Date of birth (age)	Caps	Goals	Club
20	MF	Lisa Dahlkvist	6 February 1987 (aged 21)	5	0	
21	FW	Madelaine Edlund	15 September 1985 (aged 22)	5	1	
22	GK	Kristin Hammarström	29 March 1982 (aged 26)	3	0	

== Group F ==
=== Brazil ===
Head coach: Jorge Barcellos

Brazil named a squad of 18 players and 4 alternates for the tournament.

No.	Pos.	Player	Date of birth (age)	Caps	Goals	Club
1	GK	Andréia	14 September 1977 (aged 30)		0	(Royal Spanish Football Federation) Prainsa Zaragoza
2	DF	Simone	10 February 1981 (aged 27)		1	(French Football Federation) Olympique Lyonnais
3	DF	Andréia Rosa	8 July 1984 (aged 24)		0	(Brazilian Football Confederation) Ferroviária Araraquara
4	DF	Tânia (captain)	10 March 1974 (aged 34)		1	(Brazilian Football Confederation) Saad
5	DF	Renata Costa	8 July 1986 (aged 22)		1	(Danish Football Association) Odense
6	MF	Maycon	3 April 1977 (aged 31)		2	(Brazilian Football Confederation) Saad
7	MF	Daniela	12 January 1984 (aged 24)		4	(Swedish Football Association) Linköpings FC
8	MF	Formiga	3 March 1978 (aged 30)		4	(Brazilian Football Confederation) Saad
9	MF	Ester	9 February 1982 (aged 26)		1	(Brazilian Football Confederation) Santos F.C.
10	FW	Marta	19 February 1986 (aged 22)		24	(Swedish Football Association) Umeå IK
11	FW	Cristiane	15 May 1985 (aged 23)		10	(Swedish Football Association) Linköpings FC
12	GK	Bárbara	4 July 1988 (aged 20)		0	(Brazilian Football Confederation) Sport Recife
13	MF	Francielle	18 October 1989 (aged 18)		1	(Brazilian Football Confederation) Santos F.C.
14	FW	Pretinha	19 May 1975 (aged 33)		14	(Japan Football Association) INAC Leonissa
15	FW	Fabiana	4 August 1989 (aged 19)		1	(Brazilian Football Confederation) Corinthians
16	DF	Érika	4 February 1988 (aged 20)		9	(Brazilian Football Confederation) Santos F.C.
17	FW	Maurine	14 January 1986 (aged 22)		2	(Brazilian Football Confederation) Santos F.C.
18	DF	Rosana	7 July 1982 (aged 26)		3	(Austrian Football Association) SV Neulengbach

Unenrolled alternate players
No.	Pos.	Player	Date of birth (age)	Caps	Goals	Club
19	DF	Daiane Rodrigues	22 July 1986 (aged 22)			
20	DF	Juliana	3 October 1981 (aged 26)			
21	FW	Raquel	9 July 1985 (aged 23)			
22	GK	Thaís	19 June 1987 (aged 21)			

=== Germany ===
Head coach: Silvia Neid

Germany named a squad of 18 players and 4 alternates for the tournament.

No.	Pos.	Player	Date of birth (age)	Caps	Goals	Club
1	GK	Nadine Angerer	10 November 1978 (aged 29)	62	0	(Swedish Football Association) Djurgårdens IF
2	DF	Kerstin Stegemann	29 September 1977 (aged 30)	178	7	(German Football Association) Wattenscheid 09
3	DF	Saskia Bartusiak	9 September 1982 (aged 25)	13	0	(German Football Association) FFC Frankfurt
4	DF	Babett Peter	12 May 1988 (aged 20)	17	0	(German Football Association) FFC Turbine Potsdam
5	DF	Annike Krahn	1 July 1985 (aged 23)	38	3	(German Football Association) FCR 2001 Duisburg
6	DF	Linda Bresonik	7 December 1983 (aged 24)	39	3	(German Football Association) SG Essen-Schönebeck
7	MF	Melanie Behringer	18 November 1979 (aged 28)	32	9	(German Football Association) SC Freiburg
8	FW	Sandra Smisek	3 July 1977 (aged 31)	126	32	(German Football Association) FFC Frankfurt
9	FW	Birgit Prinz (captain)	25 October 1977 (aged 30)	180	120	(German Football Association) FFC Frankfurt
10	MF	Renate Lingor	11 October 1975 (aged 32)	141	35	(German Football Association) FFC Frankfurt
11	FW	Anja Mittag	16 May 1985 (aged 23)	44	5	(German Football Association) FFC Turbine Potsdam
12	GK	Ursula Holl	26 June 1982 (aged 26)	2	0	(German Football Association) SC 07 Bad Neuenahr
13	MF	Célia Okoyino da Mbabi	29 May 1988 (aged 20)	27	3	(German Football Association) SC 07 Bad Neuenahr
14	MF	Simone Laudehr	12 July 1986 (aged 22)	13	2	(German Football Association) FCR 2001 Duisburg
15	MF	Fatmire Bajramaj	1 April 1988 (aged 20)	15	1	(German Football Association) FCR 2001 Duisburg
16	FW	Conny Pohlers	16 November 1978 (aged 29)	64	28	(German Football Association) FFC Frankfurt
17	DF	Ariane Hingst	25 July 1979 (aged 29)	149	10	(Swedish Football Association) Djurgårdens IF
18	MF	Kerstin Garefrekes	4 September 1979 (aged 28)	89	31	(German Football Association) FFC Frankfurt

Unenrolled alternate players
No.	Pos.	Player	Date of birth (age)	Caps	Goals	Club
19	MF	Isabell Bachor	10 July 1983 (aged 25)			
20	DF	Bianca Rech	25 January 1981 (aged 27)			
21	FW	Martina Müller	18 April 1980 (aged 28)			
22	GK	Ulrike Schmetz	30 October 1979 (aged 28)			

=== Nigeria ===
Head coach: Joseph Ladipo

Nigeria named a squad of 18 players and 4 alternates for the tournament.

No.	Pos.	Player	Date of birth (age)	Caps	Goals	Club
1	GK	Precious Dede	18 January 1980 (aged 28)			(Nigeria Football Federation) Delta Queens
2	DF	Efioanwan Ekpo	25 January 1984 (aged 24)			(Nigeria Football Federation) Pelican Stars
3	DF	Ayisat Yusuf	6 March 1985 (aged 23)			(Football Association of Finland) KMF Kuopio
4	MF	Perpetua Nkwocha	3 January 1976 (aged 32)			(Swedish Football Association) Sunnanå SK
5	FW	Onome Ebi	8 May 1983 (aged 25)			(Nigeria Football Federation) Bayelsa Queens
6	MF	Florence Ajayi	28 April 1977 (aged 31)			(Chinese Football Association) Tianjin TEDA
7	MF	Stella Mbachu	16 April 1978 (aged 30)			(Chinese Football Association) Tianjin TEDA
8	FW	Ifeanyi Chiejine	17 May 1983 (aged 25)			(Nigeria Football Federation) Bayelsa Queens
9	MF	Sarah Michael	22 July 1990 (aged 18)			(Nigeria Football Federation) Delta Queens
10	DF	Rita Chikwelu	6 March 1988 (aged 20)			(Football Association of Finland) United Pietarsaari
11	DF	Lilian Cole	1 August 1985 (aged 23)			(Nigeria Football Federation) Delta Queens
12	FW	Cynthia Uwak	15 July 1986 (aged 22)			(Swedish Football Association) Falköpings KIK
13	FW	Christie George (captain)	10 May 1984 (aged 24)			(Nigeria Football Federation) Pelican Stars
14	MF	Faith Ikidi	28 February 1987 (aged 21)			(Swedish Football Association) Linköpings FC
15	MF	Tawa Ishola	23 December 1988 (aged 19)			(Nigeria Football Federation) Bayelsa Queens
16	DF	Ulunma Jerome	11 April 1988 (aged 20)			(Nigeria Football Federation) Rivers Angels
17	MF	Edith Eduviere	18 June 1986 (aged 22)			(Nigeria Football Federation) FCT Queens
18	GK	Tochukwu Oluehi	2 May 1987 (aged 21)			(Nigeria Football Federation) Bayelsa Queens

Unenrolled alternate players
No.	Pos.	Player	Date of birth (age)	Caps	Goals	Club
19	MF	Gift Otuwe	15 July 1984 (aged 24)			
20	MF	Maureen Eke	19 December 1986 (aged 21)			
21	DF	Tosin Otubajo	16 July 1984 (aged 24)			
22	GK	Aladi Ayegba	25 June 1986 (aged 22)			

=== North Korea ===
Head coach: Kim Kwang-min

North Korea named a squad of 18 players and no alternates for the tournament.

No.	Pos.	Player	Date of birth (age)	Caps	Goals	Club
1	GK	Jon Myong-hui	7 August 1986 (aged 21)			(DPR Korea Football Association) Rimyongsu
2	MF	Kim Kyong-hwa	28 March 1986 (aged 22)			(DPR Korea Football Association) April 25
3	DF	Om Jong-ran	10 October 1985 (aged 22)			(DPR Korea Football Association) April 25
4	DF	Jang Yong-ok	17 September 1982 (aged 25)			(DPR Korea Football Association) April 25
5	DF	Song Jong-sun	11 March 1981 (aged 27)			(DPR Korea Football Association) Amrokkang
6	FW	Kim Ok-sim	2 July 1987 (aged 21)			(DPR Korea Football Association) Rimyongsu
7	MF	Ho Sun-hui	5 March 1980 (aged 28)			(DPR Korea Football Association) Amrokkang
8	FW	Kil Son-hui	7 March 1986 (aged 22)			(DPR Korea Football Association) Rimyongsu
9	MF	Ri Un-suk	1 January 1986 (aged 22)			(DPR Korea Football Association) April 25
10	FW	Ri Kum-suk (captain)	16 August 1978 (aged 29)			(DPR Korea Football Association) April 25
11	MF	Ri Un-gyong	19 November 1980 (aged 27)			(DPR Korea Football Association) Wolmido
12	DF	Ri Un-hyang	15 May 1988 (aged 20)			(DPR Korea Football Association) Amrokkang
13	DF	Yu Jong-hui	21 March 1986 (aged 22)			(DPR Korea Football Association) April 25
14	DF	Jang Il-ok	10 October 1986 (aged 21)			(DPR Korea Football Association) April 25
15	DF	Sonu Kyong-sun	28 September 1983 (aged 24)			(DPR Korea Football Association) April 25
16	DF	Kong Hye-ok	19 July 1983 (aged 25)			(DPR Korea Football Association) April 25
17	FW	Kim Yong-ae	7 March 1983 (aged 25)			(DPR Korea Football Association) April 25
18	GK	Han Hye-yong	4 March 1985 (aged 23)			(DPR Korea Football Association) Pyongyang City

== Group G ==
=== Japan ===
Head coach: Norio Sasaki

Japan named a squad of 18 players and 4 alternates for the tournament.

No.	Pos.	Player	Date of birth (age)	Caps	Goals	Club
1	GK	Miho Fukumoto	2 October 1983 (aged 24)	39	0	(Japan Football Association) Okayama Yunogo Belle
2	DF	Yukari Kinga	2 May 1984 (aged 24)	29	0	(Japan Football Association) NTV Beleza
3	DF	Hiromi Ikeda (captain)	22 December 1975 (aged 32)	112	4	(Japan Football Association) Tasaki Perule
4	DF	Azusa Iwashimizu	14 October 1986 (aged 21)	33	5	(Japan Football Association) NTV Beleza
5	MF	Miyuki Yanagita	11 April 1981 (aged 27)	86	11	(Japan Football Association) Urawa Reds Ladies
6	MF	Tomoe Kato	27 May 1978 (aged 30)	112	8	(Japan Football Association) NTV Beleza
7	DF	Kozue Ando	9 July 1982 (aged 26)	61	10	(Japan Football Association) Urawa Reds Ladies
8	MF	Aya Miyama	28 January 1985 (aged 23)	60	18	(Japan Football Association) Okayama Yunogo Belle
9	FW	Eriko Arakawa	30 October 1979 (aged 28)	62	19	(Japan Football Association) NTV Beleza
10	MF	Homare Sawa	6 September 1978 (aged 29)	136	68	(Japan Football Association) NTV Beleza
11	FW	Shinobu Ohno	23 January 1984 (aged 24)	57	22	(Japan Football Association) NTV Beleza
12	FW	Karina Maruyama	26 March 1983 (aged 25)	50	12	(Japan Football Association) TEPCO Mareeze
13	MF	Ayumi Hara	21 February 1979 (aged 29)	36	1	(Japan Football Association) INAC Leonessa
14	DF	Kyoko Yano	3 June 1984 (aged 24)	44	1	(Japan Football Association) Urawa Reds Ladies
15	MF	Mizuho Sakaguchi	15 October 1987 (aged 20)	21	14	(Japan Football Association) Tasaki Perule
16	MF	Rumi Utsugi	5 December 1988 (aged 19)	23	4	(Japan Football Association) NTV Beleza
17	FW	Yūki Nagasato	15 July 1987 (aged 21)	44	25	(Japan Football Association) NTV Beleza
18	GK	Ayumi Kaihori	4 September 1986 (aged 21)	2	0	(Japan Football Association) INAC Leonessa

Unenrolled alternate players
No.	Pos.	Player	Date of birth (age)	Caps	Goals	Club
19	DF	Saki Kumagai	17 October 1990 (aged 17)			
20	MF	Aya Sameshima	16 June 1987 (aged 21)			
21	FW	Michi Goto	27 July 1990 (aged 18)			
22	GK	Nozomi Yamago	16 January 1975 (aged 33)			

=== New Zealand ===
Head coach: (United Kingdom) John Herdman

New Zealand named a squad of 18 players and 4 alternates for the tournament.

No.	Pos.	Player	Date of birth (age)	Caps	Goals	Club
1	GK	Jenny Bindon	25 February 1973 (aged 35)	23	0	(New Zealand Football) Waitakere City
2	DF	Ria Percival	7 December 1989 (aged 18)	24	2	(United States Soccer Federation) FC Indiana
3	DF	Anna Green	20 August 1990 (aged 17)	8	1	(New Zealand Football) Three Kings United
4	MF	Katie Hoyle	1 February 1988 (aged 20)	12	0	(New Zealand Football) Lynn-Avon United
5	DF	Abby Erceg	20 November 1989 (aged 18)	24	2	(New Zealand Football) Western Springs
6	DF	Rebecca Smith	17 June 1981 (aged 27)	17	2	(Swedish Football Association) Sunnanå SK
7	FW	Ali Riley	30 October 1987 (aged 20)	19	0	(United States Soccer Federation) Stanford Cardinal
8	MF	Hayley Moorwood (captain)	13 February 1984 (aged 24)	32	3	(New Zealand Football) Lynn-Avon United
9	FW	Amber Hearn	28 November 1984 (aged 23)	9	1	(New Zealand Football) Lynn-Avon United
10	MF	Emily McColl	1 November 1985 (aged 22)	17	0	(United States Soccer Federation) Coastal Carolina University
11	MF	Kirsty Yallop	4 November 1986 (aged 21)	16	5	(New Zealand Football) Lynn-Avon United
12	FW	Merissa Smith	11 November 1990 (aged 17)	15	1	(New Zealand Football) Three Kings United
13	FW	Rebecca Tegg	18 December 1985 (aged 22)	5	0	(New Zealand Football) Eastern Suburbs
14	DF	Kristy Hill	1 July 1979 (aged 29)	2	0	(New Zealand Football) Three Kings United
15	FW	Emma Kete	1 September 1987 (aged 20)	11	2	(New Zealand Football) Lynn-Avon United
16	FW	Renee Leota	16 May 1990 (aged 18)	10	1	(New Zealand Football) Miramar Rangers
17	DF	Marlies Oostdam	29 July 1977 (aged 31)	24	0	(New Zealand Football) Eastern Suburbs
18	GK	Rachel Howard	30 November 1977 (aged 30)	14	0	(German Football Association) TSV Crailsheim

Unenrolled alternate players
No.	Pos.	Player	Date of birth (age)	Caps	Goals	Club
19	MF	Betsy Hassett	4 August 1990 (aged 18)			
20	MF	Annalie Longo	1 July 1991 (aged 17)			
21	DF	Maia Jackman	25 May 1975 (aged 33)			
22	GK	Stephanie Puckrin	22 August 1979 (aged 28)			

=== Norway ===
Head coach: Bjarne Berntsen

Norway named a squad of 18 players and 4 alternates for the tournament.

No.	Pos.	Player	Date of birth (age)	Caps	Goals	Club
1	GK	Erika Skarbø	12 June 1987 (aged 21)	7	0	(Norwegian Football Federation) Arna-Bjørnar Fotball
2	DF	Ane Stangeland Horpestad (captain)	2 June 1980 (aged 28)	100	5	(Norwegian Football Federation) Klepp IL
3	DF	Gunhild Følstad	3 November 1981 (aged 26)	69	1	(Norwegian Football Federation) Trondheims-Ørn SK
4	MF	Ingvild Stensland	3 August 1981 (aged 27)	68	2	(Swedish Football Association) Kopparbergs/Göteborg FC
5	DF	Siri Nordby	4 August 1978 (aged 30)	38	1	(Norwegian Football Federation) Røa IL
6	MF	Marie Knutsen	31 August 1982 (aged 25)	48	5	(Norwegian Football Federation) Røa IL
7	DF	Trine Rønning	14 June 1982 (aged 26)	83	15	(Norwegian Football Federation) Kolbotn Fotball
8	FW	Solveig Gulbrandsen	12 January 1981 (aged 27)	121	39	(Norwegian Football Federation) Kolbotn Fotball
9	FW	Isabell Herlovsen	23 June 1988 (aged 20)	35	5	(Norwegian Football Federation) Kolbotn Fotball
10	FW	Melissa Wiik	7 February 1985 (aged 23)	30	12	(Norwegian Football Federation) Asker SK
11	FW	Leni Larsen Kaurin	21 March 1981 (aged 27)	44	3	(German Football Association) 1. FFC Turbine Potsdam
12	DF	Marit Fiane Christensen	11 December 1980 (aged 27)	58	7	(Norwegian Football Federation) Røa IL
13	MF	Lene Storløkken	20 June 1981 (aged 27)	34	5	(Norwegian Football Federation) Team Strømmen FK
14	FW	Guro Knutsen	10 January 1985 (aged 23)	8	1	(Norwegian Football Federation) Røa IL
15	DF	Marita Skammelsrud Lund	29 January 1989 (aged 19)	7	0	(Norwegian Football Federation) Team Strømmen FK
16	FW	Elise Thorsnes	14 August 1988 (aged 19)	16	1	(Norwegian Football Federation) Arna-Bjørnar Fotball
17	FW	Lene Mykjåland	20 February 1987 (aged 21)	18	5	(Norwegian Football Federation) Røa IL
18	GK	Christine Colombo Nilsen	30 April 1982 (aged 26)	5	0	(Norwegian Football Federation) Kolbotn Fotball

Unenrolled alternate players
No.	Pos.	Player	Date of birth (age)	Caps	Goals	Club
19	DF	Runa Vikestad	13 August 1984 (aged 23)			
20	MF	Anneli Giske	25 July 1985 (aged 23)			
21	FW	Kristin Lie	13 December 1978 (aged 29)			
22	GK	Ingrid Hjelmseth	10 April 1980 (aged 28)			

=== United States ===
Head coach: (Sweden) Pia Sundhage

The United States named a squad of 18 players and 4 alternates for the tournament. Prior to the tournament, Abby Wambach withdrew injured and was replaced on 17 July 2008 by Lauren Cheney, who was initially selected as an alternate player. India Trotter subsequently filled the vacant alternate spot.

No.	Pos.	Player	Date of birth (age)	Caps	Goals	Club
1	GK	Hope Solo	30 July 1981 (aged 27)	64	0	(United States Soccer Federation) University of Washington
2	DF	Heather Mitts	9 June 1978 (aged 30)	78	2	(United States Soccer Federation) University of Florida
3	DF	Christie Rampone (captain)	24 June 1975 (aged 33)	193	4	(United States Soccer Federation) Monmouth University
4	DF	Rachel Buehler	26 August 1985 (aged 22)	11	0	(United States Soccer Federation) Stanford University
5	MF	Lindsay Tarpley	22 September 1983 (aged 24)	96	26	(United States Soccer Federation) University of North Carolina
6	FW	Natasha Kai	22 May 1983 (aged 25)	48	19	(United States Soccer Federation) University of Hawaiʻi
7	MF	Shannon Boxx	29 June 1977 (aged 31)	92	18	(United States Soccer Federation) University of Notre Dame
8	FW	Amy Rodriguez	17 February 1987 (aged 21)	19	4	(United States Soccer Federation) University of Southern California
9	MF	Heather O'Reilly	2 January 1985 (aged 23)	90	19	(United States Soccer Federation) University of North Carolina
10	MF	Aly Wagner	10 August 1980 (aged 27)	121	21	(United States Soccer Federation) Santa Clara University
11	MF	Carli Lloyd	16 July 1982 (aged 26)	62	15	(United States Soccer Federation) Rutgers University
12	FW	Lauren Cheney	30 September 1987 (aged 20)	12	0	(United States Soccer Federation) University of California
13	MF	Tobin Heath	29 May 1988 (aged 20)	12	2	(United States Soccer Federation) University of North Carolina
14	DF	Stephanie Cox	3 April 1986 (aged 22)	42	0	(United States Soccer Federation) University of Portland
15	DF	Kate Markgraf	23 August 1976 (aged 31)	181	0	(United States Soccer Federation) University of Notre Dame
16	MF	Angela Hucles	5 July 1978 (aged 30)	84	7	(United States Soccer Federation) University of Virginia
17	DF	Lori Chalupny	29 January 1984 (aged 24)	70	6	(United States Soccer Federation) University of North Carolina
18	GK	Nicole Barnhart	10 October 1981 (aged 26)	9	0	(United States Soccer Federation) Stanford University

Unenrolled alternate players
No.	Pos.	Player	Date of birth (age)	Caps	Goals	Club
19–21	DF	Ali Krieger	28 July 1984 (aged 24)			
19–21	DF	India Trotter	10 March 1985 (aged 23)			
19–21	MF	Kacey White	27 April 1984 (aged 24)			
22	GK	Briana Scurry	7 September 1971 (aged 36)			
