= 2007 FIFA Women's World Cup Group B =

One of four groups of nations competing at the 2007 FIFA Women's World Cup

Group B was one of four groups of nations competing at the 2007 FIFA Women's World Cup. The group's first round of matches began on 11 September and its last matches were played on 18 September 2007. Most matches were played at the Chengdu Sports Center in Chengdu. All four teams in this group were drawn to Group A in the previous edition, the first time in FIFA tournament's history (three were also in the same group in 1999).

United States topped the group, joined in the second round by North Korea, the only team the United States failed to beat. Sweden surprisingly failed to make the second round.

== Standings ==
Pos	Team	Pld	W	D	L	GF	GA	GD	Pts	Qualification
1	United States	3	2	1	0	5	2	+3	7	Advance to knockout stage
2	North Korea	3	1	1	1	5	4	+1	4	Advance to knockout stage
3	Sweden	3	1	1	1	3	4	−1	4	
4	Nigeria	3	0	1	2	1	4	−3	1	

Source: FIFA
Rules for classification: Group stage tiebreakers

== Matches ==
All times are local (UTC+8)

=== United States vs North Korea ===
11 September 2007
17:00

United States	2–2	North Korea
Wambach 50'; O'Reilly 69'	Report	Kil Son-hui 58'; Kim Yong-ae 62'

Chengdu Sports Centre Stadium, Chengdu
Attendance: 35,100
Referee: Nicole Petignat (Switzerland)

United States:
GK	18	Hope Solo
DF	3	Christie Rampone	(yellow card) 45'
DF	4	Cat Whitehill
DF	14	Stephanie Lopez
DF	15	Kate Markgraf
MF	13	Kristine Lilly (c)
MF	7	Shannon Boxx
MF	11	Carli Lloyd
MF	17	Lori Chalupny
FW	9	Heather O'Reilly		(substituted off) 90+2'
FW	20	Abby Wambach
Substitutions:
FW	6	Natasha Kai		(substituted on) 90+2'
Manager:
(United States) Greg Ryan

North Korea:
GK	21	Jon Myong Hui
DF	3	Om Jong Ran
DF	5	Song Jong Sun
DF	15	Sonu Kyong Sun
DF	16	Kong Hye Ok
MF	2	Kim Kyong Hwa
MF	7	Ho Sun Hui		(substituted off) 22'
MF	9	Ri Un Suk
MF	12	Ri Un Gyong
FW	8	Kil Son Hui
FW	10	Ri Kum Suk (c)
Substitutions:
FW	17	Kim Yong Ae	(substituted on) 22'	(substituted off) 90'
FW	19	Jong Pok Sim	(yellow card) 90+1'	(substituted on) 90'
Manager:
(North Korea) Kim Kwang-min

=== Nigeria vs Sweden ===
11 September 2007
20:00

Nigeria	1–1	Sweden
Uwak 82'	Report	Svensson 50'

Chengdu Sports Centre Stadium, Chengdu
Attendance: 35,100
Referee: Niu Huijun (China)

Nigeria:
GK	1	Precious Dede
DF	5	Onome Ebi
DF	13	Christie George (c)
DF	14	Faith Ikidi
DF	16	Ulunma Jerome
MF	15	Maureen Mmadu	(substituted off) 59'
MF	10	Rita Chikwelu
FW	11	Chi-Chi Igbo	(substituted off) 35'
FW	18	Cynthia Uwak
FW	8	Ifeanyi Chiejine
FW	4	Perpetua Nkwocha
Substitutions:
FW	7	Stella Mbachu	(substituted on) 35'
MF	2	Efioanwan Ekpo	(substituted on) 59'
Manager:
(Nigeria) Ntiero Effiom

Sweden:
GK	1	Hedvig Lindahl
DF	3	Stina Segerström
DF	4	Hanna Marklund
DF	6	Sara Thunebro
DF	16	Anna Paulson
DF	13	Frida Östberg
MF	5	Caroline Seger
MF	15	Therese Sjögran	(yellow card) 12'
MF	8	Lotta Schelin		(substituted off) 83'
FW	10	Hanna Ljungberg		(substituted off) 69'
FW	11	Victoria Svensson (c)
Substitutions:
FW	14	Sara Johansson		(substituted on) 69'
MF	20	Linda Forsberg		(substituted on) 83'
Manager:
(Sweden) Thomas Dennerby

=== Sweden vs United States ===
14 September 2007
17:00

Sweden	0–2	United States
	Report	Wambach 34' (pen.), 58'

Chengdu Sports Centre Stadium, Chengdu
Attendance: 35,600
Referee: Gyöngyi Gaál (Hungary)

Sweden:
GK	1	Hedvig Lindahl
DF	3	Stina Segerström	(yellow card) 34'	(substituted off) 81'
DF	4	Hanna Marklund
DF	16	Anna Paulson
DF	13	Frida Östberg
MF	5	Caroline Seger	(yellow card) 90+3'
MF	20	Linda Forsberg
MF	15	Therese Sjögran		(substituted off) 65'
MF	8	Lotta Schelin
FW	10	Hanna Ljungberg
FW	11	Victoria Svensson (c)
Substitutions:
MF	18	Nilla Fischer		(substituted on) 65'
FW	9	Therese Lundin		(substituted on) 81'
Manager:
(Sweden) Thomas Dennerby

United States:
GK	18	Hope Solo
DF	3	Christie Rampone
DF	4	Cat Whitehill
DF	14	Stephanie Lopez
DF	15	Kate Markgraf
MF	13	Kristine Lilly (c)
MF	12	Leslie Osborne
MF	11	Carli Lloyd	(substituted off) 46'
MF	17	Lori Chalupny
FW	6	Lindsay Tarpley	(substituted off) 67'
FW	20	Abby Wambach
Substitutions:
MF	7	Shannon Boxx	(substituted on) 46'
FW	9	Heather O'Reilly	(substituted on) 67'
Manager:
(United States) Greg Ryan

=== North Korea vs Nigeria ===
14 September 2007
20:00

North Korea	2–0	Nigeria
Kim Kyong-hwa 17'; Ri Kum-suk 21'	Report

Chengdu Sports Centre Stadium, Chengdu
Attendance: 35,600
Referee: Tammy Ogston (Australia)

North Korea:
GK	21	Jon Myong Hui
DF	3	Om Jong Ran
DF	5	Song Jong Sun
DF	15	Sonu Kyong Sun
DF	16	Kong Hye Ok
MF	2	Kim Kyong Hwa		(substituted off) 77'
MF	9	Ri Un Suk
MF	12	Ri Un Gyong
FW	17	Kim Yong Ae
FW	8	Kil Son Hui
FW	10	Ri Kum Suk (c)	(yellow card) 77'
Substitutions:
FW	19	Jong Pok Sim		(substituted on) 77'
Manager:
(North Korea) Kim Kwang-min

Nigeria:
GK	1	Precious Dede
DF	5	Onome Ebi		(substituted off) 30'
DF	13	Christie George (c)
DF	14	Faith Ikidi
DF	16	Ulunma Jerome	(yellow card) 52'
MF	2	Efioanwan Ekpo
MF	10	Rita Chikwelu		(substituted off) 61'
FW	7	Stella Mbachu
FW	18	Cynthia Uwak
FW	8	Ifeanyi Chiejine	(yellow card) 35'	(substituted off) 80'
FW	4	Perpetua Nkwocha
Substitutions:
DF	19	Lilian Cole		(substituted on) 30'
MF	15	Maureen Mmadu		(substituted on) 61'
FW	11	Chi-Chi Igbo		(substituted on) 80'
Manager:
(Nigeria) Ntiero Effiom

=== Nigeria vs United States ===
18 September 2007
20:00

Nigeria	0–1	United States
	Report	Chalupny 1'

Hongkou Football Stadium, Shanghai
Attendance: 6,100
Referee: Mayumi Oiwa (Japan)

Nigeria:
GK	1	Precious Dede
DF	19	Lilian Cole	(yellow card) 14'
DF	13	Christie George (c)
DF	14	Faith Ikidi
DF	16	Ulunma Jerome
MF	2	Efioanwan Ekpo
MF	10	Rita Chikwelu
FW	7	Stella Mbachu
FW	18	Cynthia Uwak		(substituted off) 83'
FW	11	Chi-Chi Igbo		(substituted off) 22'
FW	4	Perpetua Nkwocha
Substitutions:
FW	8	Ifeanyi Chiejine		(substituted on) 22'
MF	9	Ogonna Chukwudi		(substituted on) 83'
Manager:
(Nigeria) Ntiero Effiom

United States:
GK	18	Hope Solo
DF	3	Christie Rampone	(substituted off) 77'
DF	4	Cat Whitehill
DF	14	Stephanie Lopez
DF	15	Kate Markgraf
MF	13	Kristine Lilly (c)	(substituted off) 84'
MF	7	Shannon Boxx
MF	11	Carli Lloyd	(substituted off) 64'
MF	17	Lori Chalupny
FW	9	Heather O'Reilly
FW	20	Abby Wambach
Substitutions:
MF	12	Leslie Osborne	(substituted on) 64'
DF	8	Tina Ellertson	(substituted on) 77'
FW	6	Lindsay Tarpley	(substituted on) 84'
Manager:
(United States) Greg Ryan

=== North Korea vs Sweden ===
18 September 2007
20:00

North Korea	1–2	Sweden
Ri Un-suk 22'	Report	Schelin 4', 54'

Tianjin Olympic Center Stadium, Tianjin
Attendance: 33,196
Referee: Christine Beck (Germany)

North Korea:
GK	21	Jon Myong Hui	(yellow card) 88'
DF	3	Om Jong Ran
DF	5	Song Jong Sun
DF	15	Sonu Kyong Sun
DF	16	Kong Hye Ok
MF	2	Kim Kyong Hwa		(substituted off) 56'
MF	9	Ri Un Suk
MF	12	Ri Un Gyong
FW	17	Kim Yong Ae	(yellow card) 32'	(substituted off) 60'
FW	8	Kil Son Hui		(substituted off) 85'
FW	10	Ri Kum Suk (c)
Substitutions:
DF	20	Hong Myong Gum		(substituted on) 56'
FW	19	Jong Pok Sim		(substituted on) 60'
MF	6	Kim Ok Sim		(substituted on) 85'
Manager:
(North Korea) Kim Kwang-min

Sweden:
GK	1	Hedvig Lindahl
DF	2	Karolina Westberg
DF	4	Hanna Marklund
DF	16	Anna Paulson		(substituted off) 69'
DF	13	Frida Östberg	(yellow card) 31'
MF	5	Caroline Seger
MF	18	Nilla Fischer
MF	15	Therese Sjögran
MF	8	Lotta Schelin	(yellow card) 82'
FW	10	Hanna Ljungberg		(substituted off) 40'
FW	11	Victoria Svensson (c)
Substitutions:
DF	6	Sara Thunebro	(substituted on) 40'	(substituted off) 89'
FW	14	Sara Johansson		(substituted on) 69'
FW	9	Therese Lundin		(substituted on) 89'
Manager:
(Sweden) Thomas Dennerby

== See also ==
- Nigeria at the FIFA Women's World Cup
- North Korea at the FIFA Women's World Cup
- Sweden at the FIFA Women's World Cup
- United States at the FIFA Women's World Cup
