= Football at the 2006 Asian Games =

Football tournament in Qatar

- Venues: Al-Ahli Stadium; Al-Arabi Stadium; Al-Gharrafa Stadium; Al-Rayyan Stadium; Al-Sadd Stadium; Al-Wakrah Stadium; Qatar SC Stadium
- Dates: 18 November – 15 December
- Competitors: 697 from 29 nations

Medalists
gold medal	Qatar (men); North Korea (women)
silver medal	Iraq (men); Japan (women)
bronze medal	Iran (men); China (women)

Football at the 2006 Asian Games was held in Doha, Qatar from 18 November to 15 December 2006. The opening match was played 14 days prior to the opening ceremony. In this tournament, some 30 teams played in the men's competition, and 8 teams participated in women's competition.

Turkmenistan, and Yemen withdrew from the competition before playing their first match. The organisation announced a new competition format because of this. Instead of only the group winners of the first round to go through to the second round, now also both runners-up qualified.

Later India also announced their retirement, however they remained in the tournament on a "no cost to government basis". Iran was taken out of competition prior to their first match, due to a suspension by FIFA. However, FIFA lifted the suspension on Iran under-23 team on 26 November 2006 so they returned to the original Group D stage.

Age limit for the men teams is under-23, same as the age limit in football competitions in Olympic Games, while three overage players are allowed among each squad.

== Venues ==
Location of the stadiums of the Football at the 2006 Asian Games.
1 Al-Ahli Stadium
2 Al-Arabi Stadium
3 Qatar SC Stadium
4 Al-Gharrafa Stadium
5 Al-Rayyan Stadium
6 Al-Sadd Stadium
7 Al-Wakrah Stadium

There are 3 host cities, including 7 stadiums hosted the tournament.

City	Stadium	Capacity	Ref.
Doha	Al-Ahli Stadium	20,000	
Doha	Al-Arabi Stadium	13,000	
Doha	Qatar SC Stadium	12,500	
Al Rayyan	Al-Gharrafa Stadium	25,000	
Al Rayyan	Al-Rayyan Stadium	25,000	
Al Rayyan	Al-Sadd Stadium	12,000	
Al Wakrah	Al-Wakrah Stadium	20,000	

== Schedule ==
Q	Qualification	P	Preliminary round	¼	Quarterfinals	½	Semifinals	B	Bronze medal match	G	Gold medal match

Event↓/Date →	18th Sat	19th Sun	20th Mon	21st Tue	22nd Wed	23rd Thu	24th Fri	25th Sat	26th Sun	27th Mon	28th Tue	29th Wed	30th Thu	1st Fri	2nd Sat	3rd Sun	4th Mon	5th Tue	6th Wed	7th Thu	8th Fri	9th Sat	10th Sun	11th Mon	12th Tue	13th Wed		14th Thu	15th Fri
Men	Q			Q			Q				P	P			P	P		P	P			¼			½			B	G
Women													P				P			P			½			B	G		

== Medalists ==
Event	Gold	Silver	Bronze
Men	Qatar; Mohamed Saqr; Abdulrahman Mesbeh; Abdulla Al-Berik; Majdi Siddiq; Ali Nasser; Mesaad Al-Hamad; Hussein Yasser; Magid Mohamed; Ibrahim Al-Ghanim; Talal Al-Bloushi; Adel Lami; Wesam Rizik; Waleed Jassem; Yusef Ahmed; Abdulla Koni; Qasem Burhan; Sebastián Soria; Khalfan Ibrahim; Younes Ali; Bilal Mohammed	Iraq; Mohammed Noor Al-Deen; Mohammed Ali; Haidar Raheem; Mustafa Karim; Samer Saeed; Ali Mansour; Younis Mahmoud; Jassim Mohammed; Haidar Sabah; Ali Rehema; Ali Khudhair; Alaa Abdul-Zahra; Karrar Jassim; Salam Shaker; Haidar Aboodi; Mohammed Gassid; Ahmed Abid Ali; Muayad Khalid; Osama Ali; Ahmed Jabbar	Iran; Alireza Haghighi; Mohsen Arzani; Jalal Akbari; Jalal Hosseini; Pejman Montazeri; Behshad Yavarzadeh; Milad Nouri; Maziar Zare; Mehrdad Oladi; Arash Borhani; Mohammad Gholamin; Sheys Rezaei; Saeid Chahjouei; Hossein Mahini; Mohammad Nouri; Khosro Heidari; Ehsan Khorsandi; Adel Kolahkaj; Mehrdad Pouladi; Hassan Roudbarian
Women	North Korea; Phi Un-hui; Jang Ok-gyong; Om Jong-ran; Sonu Kyong-sun; Song Jong-sun; Ri Un-suk; Kim Yong-ae; Ri Un-gyong; Ho Sun-hui; Kim Hye-yong; Kim Tan-sil; Kong Hye-ok; Ri Kum-suk; Jong Pok-sim; Ri Un-hyang; Jon Myong-hui; Kim Kyong-hwa; Kil Son-hui	Japan; Nozomi Yamago; Hiromi Isozaki; Aya Shimokozuru; Akiko Sudo; Kyoko Yano; Tomoe Sakai; Kozue Ando; Miyuki Yanagita; Eriko Arakawa; Homare Sawa; Miho Fukumoto; Maiko Nakaoka; Azusa Iwashimizu; Karina Maruyama; Aya Miyama; Shinobu Ono; Yuki Nagasato; Mizuho Sakaguchi	China; Han Wenxia; Liu Huana; Li Jie; Weng Xinzhi; Pu Wei; Yuan Fan; Bi Yan; Yue Min; Han Duan; Ma Xiaoxu; Zhang Tong; Wang Dandan; Wang Kun; Ren Liping; Liu Yali; Pan Lina; Zhang Yanru; Qu Feifei

== Medal table ==
Rank	Nation	Gold	Silver	Bronze	Total
1	North Korea (PRK)	1	0	0	1
1	Qatar (QAT)	1	0	0	1
3	Iraq (IRQ)	0	1	0	1
3	Japan (JPN)	0	1	0	1
5	China (CHN)	0	0	1	1
5	Iran (IRI)	0	0	1	1
Totals (6 entries)		2	2	2	6

== Draw ==
The draw ceremony for the team sports was held on 7 September 2006 at Doha.

=== Men ===
Eight teams who did not enter 2002 had to play in Round 1; 22 other teams qualify directly for the tournament proper.

Round 1 – Group A

- Jordan
- Tajikistan
- Kyrgyzstan
- Macau

Round 1 – Group B

- Singapore
- Syria
- Indonesia
- Iraq

Round 2 – Group A

- Qatar
- United Arab Emirates
- Uzbekistan
- 1st Round 1 – Group A

Round 2 – Group B

- South Korea
- Bahrain
- Vietnam
- Bangladesh

Round 2 – Group C

- Thailand
- Kuwait
- ~~Yemen~~*
- Palestine

Round 2 – Group D

- Iran
- India
- Hong Kong
- Maldives

Round 2 – Group E

- China
- Oman
- Malaysia
- 1st Round 1 – Group B

Round 2 – Group F

- Japan
- North Korea
- ~~Turkmenistan~~*
- Pakistan

* Turkmenistan and Yemen withdrew from the competition and were replaced by 2nd placed teams from Round 1.

=== Women ===
Group A

- China
- Japan
- ~~Maldives~~*
- Jordan

Group B

- North Korea
- South Korea
- Thailand*
- Chinese Taipei
- Vietnam

* Maldives withdrew, following this Thailand moved to Group A to balance the number of teams in each group.

== Final standing ==
=== Men ===
Rank	Team	Pld	W	D	L	GF	GA	GD	Pts
1st place, gold medalist(s)	Qatar	6	5	0	1	13	2	+11	15
2nd place, silver medalist(s)	Iraq	9	6	1	2	17	3	+14	19
3rd place, bronze medalist(s)	Iran	6	4	1	1	10	6	+4	13
4	South Korea	6	4	0	2	9	2	+7	12
5	China	4	3	1	0	8	4	+4	10
6	Uzbekistan	4	3	0	1	7	4	+3	9
7	Thailand	4	3	0	1	4	3	+1	9
8	North Korea	4	2	1	1	3	4	−1	7
9	Bahrain	3	2	0	1	7	3	+4	6
10	Kuwait	3	2	0	1	5	1	+4	6
11	Japan	3	2	0	1	5	4	+1	6
12	Syria	6	2	3	1	6	2	+4	9
13	Hong Kong	3	1	1	1	3	3	0	4
14	India	3	1	1	1	3	4	−1	4
15	Vietnam	3	1	0	2	6	5	+1	3
16	Oman	3	1	0	2	4	5	−1	3
17	Kyrgyzstan	6	2	2	2	12	7	+5	8
18	United Arab Emirates	3	0	1	2	3	7	−4	1
19	Jordan	6	1	3	2	15	7	+8	6
20	Maldives	3	0	0	3	2	6	−4	0
21	Pakistan	3	0	0	3	2	6	−4	0
22	Palestine	3	0	0	3	0	6	−6	0
23	Malaysia	3	0	0	3	2	10	−8	0
24	Bangladesh	3	0	0	3	2	13	−11	0
25	Tajikistan	3	1	2	0	7	3	+4	5
26	Singapore	3	0	2	1	1	3	−2	2
27	Indonesia	3	0	1	2	2	11	−9	1
28	Macau	3	0	0	3	1	25	−24	0

=== Women ===
Rank	Team	Pld	W	D	L	GF	GA	GD	Pts
1st place, gold medalist(s)	North Korea	5	4	1	0	16	2	+14	13
2nd place, silver medalist(s)	Japan	5	4	1	0	21	1	+20	13
3rd place, bronze medalist(s)	China	5	3	0	2	22	4	+18	9
4	South Korea	5	2	0	3	7	10	−3	6
5	Chinese Taipei	3	1	0	2	3	7	−4	3
6	Thailand	3	1	0	2	5	11	−6	3
7	Vietnam	3	0	0	3	2	11	−9	0
8	Jordan	3	0	0	3	0	30	−30	0

== Impact on Qatar ==
Scholars suggest that the 2006 Asian Games had long-term consequences for Qatar by boosting its tourist economy, aiding in economic diversification away from oil, and encouraging infrastructural development, while anticipating Qatar's bid for the 2022 FIFA World Cup.
