= Chengdu Sports Centre =

Sports venue in Chengdu, China

Coordinates: 30°39′57.18″N 104°3′56.01″E

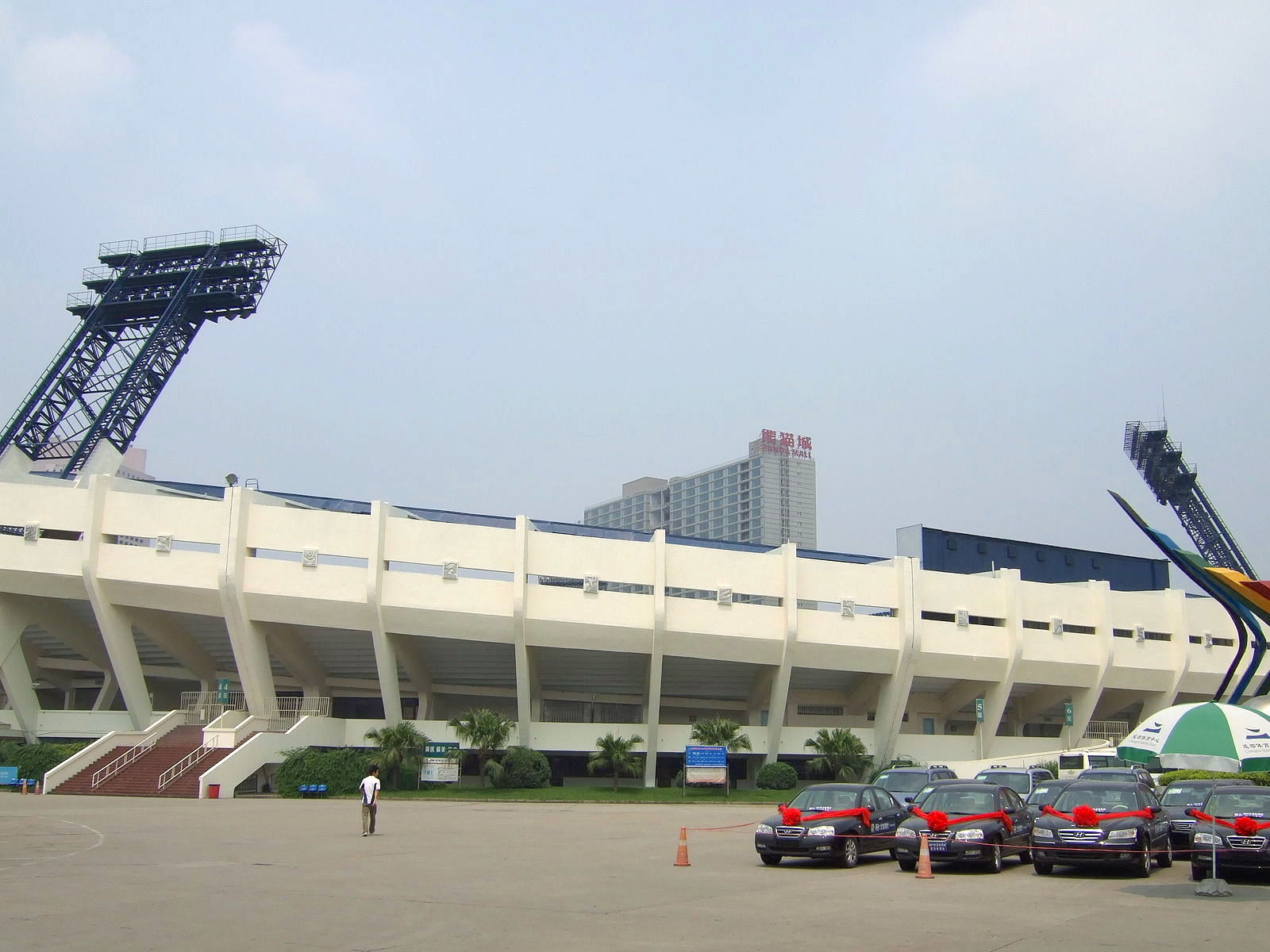
Chengdu Sports Center

The Chengdu Sports Center (Chinese: 成都市体育中心), or Sichuan Provincial Sports Center (Chinese: 四川省体育中心), is a sports complex with a multiuse stadium in Chengdu, China which is used mostly for soccer matches.

The stadium holds 39,225 and opened on 28 December 1991; it was the home of the Chengdu Blades, a soccer club in China League One (the second tier of the Chinese soccer pyramid).

It was one of the venues for the group stages of the 2007 FIFA Women's World Cup. It hosted six games in total.

The stadium has also held concerts. Past events include Canadian singer Avril Lavigne's Best Damn Tour on September 30, 2008, marking the first time a Western artist performed at the stadium, and also K-pop boy band BigBang's Made World Tour on August 14, 2015 in front of 30,000 fans. Mariah Carey performed at the stadium during her Elusive Chanteuse Show tour on October 12, 2014.

In 2013, ruins dating back as to as far as the Han Dynasty were discovered underneath the stadium. Subsequently, excavation was undertaken at the site, and the stadium was reopened to the public as an archaeological and historic site in 2023 after nine years of work.

== 2007 FIFA Women's World Cup matches ==
Date	Stage	Team	Res.	Team	Att.
11 September 2007	Group B	United States	2–2	North Korea	35,100
11 September 2007	Group B	Nigeria	1–1	Sweden	35,100
14 September 2007	Group B	Sweden	0–2	United States	35,600
14 September 2007	Group B	North Korea	2–0	Nigeria	35,600
17 September 2007	Group A	England	6–1	Argentina	30,730
20 September 2007	Group C	Australia	2–2	Canada	29,300

Preceded by Thong Nhat Stadium (Vietnam) Ho Chi Minh City	AFC Women's Asian Cup; Final Venue; 2010	Succeeded by Thong Nhat Stadium (Vietnam) Ho Chi Minh City
