= Josefine Öqvist =

Swedish footballer

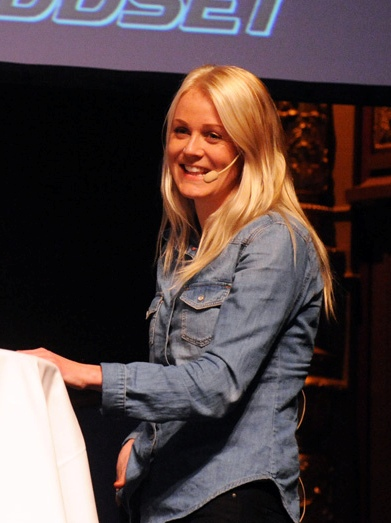
- Öqvist in 2013

Personal information
- Full name: Anna Lenita Josefine Öqvist
- Date of birth: 23 July 1983 (age 43)
- Place of birth: Uppsala, Sweden
- Height: 1.69 m (5 ft 7 in)
- Position: Winger

Youth career
- Storvreta IK

Senior career*
Years	Team	Apps	(Gls)
1998	Danmarks IF		
1999–2004	Bälinge IF		
2005–2010	Linköpings FC		
2011	Tyresö FF	19	(7)
2013	Kristianstads DFF	10	(4)
2013–2014	Montpellier	22	(18)

International career^{‡}
2002–2013	Sweden	80	(20)
Medal record
Women's football
Representing Sweden
FIFA Women's World Cup
Silver medal – second place	2003 United States	Team
Bronze medal – third place	2011 Germany	Team
- * Club domestic league appearances and goals as of 15:11, 7 June 2014 (UTC) ‡ National team caps and goals as of 15:11, 7 June 2014 (UTC)

Anna Lenita Josefine Öqvist (born 23 July 1983) is a Swedish former footballer who played for Montpellier of the French Division 1 Féminine and the Swedish national team. She scored a critical goal in the 86' minute of the 2003 FIFA Women's World Cup semifinals against Canada to put Sweden through to the final. Nicknamed Jossan, she was named the Swedish Rookie of the Year in 2003.

While her primary position is a forward, she was named as a midfielder for the 2008 Summer Olympics. During the tournament she was injured and replaced by Maria Aronsson. Along with Caroline Jönsson, Öqvist tore her anterior cruciate ligament (ACL) before the 2007 FIFA Women's World Cup and was consequently removed from the roster to recover.

Pin-up girl Öqvist attracted attention for a bikini photoshoot in the magazine, Slitz, in the Spring of 2004. She was also filmed swapping jerseys with a male supporter at the 2011 FIFA Women's World Cup in Germany.

== Club career ==
After the 2008 season, Swedish giants Umeå IK wanted Öqvist. Instead she signed a new two-year contract with Linköping. Öqvist suffered a tragedy in her personal life in November 2009 when her 29-year-old sister Caroline had a fatal epileptic seizure. In 2011 Öqvist signed with the top attendance team in Sweden, Tyresö FF. Tyresö boasted three members of the Swedish national team along with players from the Brazilian and Dutch national teams.

In January 2012, it was revealed that Öqvist was pregnant and would miss the entire season, including the 2012 London Olympics. After the birth of daughter Stella, Öqvist returned to play in 2013, but decided to join Kristianstads DFF instead of Tyresö. She lived in nearby Malmö with her partner Stefan Lassen, the Danish professional ice hockey player who was playing for Malmö Redhawks.

After featuring for hosts Sweden at UEFA Women's Euro 2013, Öqvist signed a contract with French club Montpellier. She performed well in France but soon became unsettled because Lassen had moved to Austria to play for Graz 99ers. He described living so far apart from Öqvist and Stella as "unsustainable". In May 2014 Öqvist announced her retirement from football, stating that she wanted to stop while still playing at the top level.

== International career ==
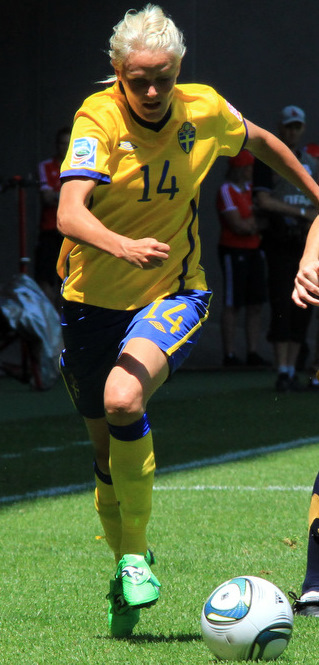
Öqvist playing for Sweden in the 2011 World Cup

On 18 August 2002, coach Marika Domanski-Lyfors gave Öqvist her senior Sweden women's national football team debut in a 1–0 win over North Korea.

Öqvist was a member of the Sweden team that won a bronze medal at the 2011 World Cup and played in all the matches. On 16 July 2011, she received a red card in the 3rd place game against France after clashing with Sonia Bompastor, but Sweden went on to win 2–1 despite being a player down. Öqvist had scored in the semi-final against eventual winners Japan, but Sweden were beaten 3–1.

In February 2014, Öqvist retired from international football after 12 years of playing for Sweden. She had scored 20 goals in her 80 caps.

=== Matches and goals scored at World Cup & Olympic tournaments ===
Josefine Öqvist appeared Sweden in two World Cups (USA 2003, Germany 2011) and two Olympic Games (Athens 2004, Beijing 2008).

Key (expand for notes on "world cup and olympic goals")
Location	Geographic location of the venue where the competition occurred
Lineup	Start – played entire match on minute (off player) – substituted on at the minute indicated, and player was substituted off at the same time off minute (on player) – substituted off at the minute indicated, and player was substituted on at the same time (c) – captain
Min	The minute in the match the goal was scored. For list that include caps, blank indicates played in the match but did not score a goal.
Assist/pass	The ball was passed by the player, which assisted in scoring the goal. This column depends on the availability and source of this information.
penalty or pk	Goal scored on penalty-kick which was awarded due to foul by opponent. (Goals scored in penalty-shoot-out, at the end of a tied match after extra-time, are not included.)
Score	The match score after the goal was scored.
Result	The final score. W – match was won L – match was lost to opponent D – match was drawn (W) – penalty-shoot-out was won after a drawn match (L) – penalty-shoot-out was lost after a drawn match
aet	The score at the end of extra-time; the match was tied at the end of 90' regulation
pso	Penalty-shoot-out score shown in parentheses; the match was tied at the end of extra-time
	Pink background color – Olympic women's football tournament
	Blue background color – FIFA women's world cup final tournament

Goal	Match	Date	Location	Opponent	Lineup	Min	Score	Result	Competition
(United States) USA 2003 FIFA Women's World Cup
	1	2003-9-21	Washington, DC	United States	on 83' (off Ljungberg)			1–3 L	Group match
	2	2003-9-25	Philadelphia	North Korea	on 86' (off Ljungberg)			1–0 W	Group match
	3	2003-9-28	Columbus	Nigeria	on 85' (off Svensson)			3–0 W	Group match
1	4	2003-10-5	Portland	Canada	on 70' (off Sjöström)	86	2-1	2–1 W	Semi-Final
(Greece) Athens 2004 Women's Olympic Football Tournament
	5	2004-8-11	Volos	Japan	on 68' (off Ljungberg)			0–1 L	Group match
	6	2004-8-17	Volos	Nigeria	on 63' (off Sjöström)			2–1 W	Group match
	7	2004-8-20	Volos	Australia	on 71' (off Sjögran)			2–1 W	Quarter-Final
	8	2004-8-23	Patras	Brazil	on 86' (off Bengtsson)			0–1 L	Semi-final
(China) Beijing 2008 Women's Olympic Football Tournament
	9	2008-8-6	Tianjin	China	off 73' (on Forsberg)			1–2 L	Group match
Germany 2011 FIFA Women's World Cup
	10	2011-7-2	Augsburg	North Korea	on 76' (off Landström)			1–0 W	Group match
	11	2011-7-6	Wolfsburg	United States	Start			2–1 W	Group match
	12	2011-7-10	Augsburg	Australia	off 83' (on Edlund)			3–1 W	Quarter-Final
2	13	2011-7-13	Frankfurt	Japan	off 83' (on Göransson)	10	1-0	1–3 L	Semi-Final
	14	2011-7-16	Sinsheim	France	Start (Note: Öqvist was expelled from the match in the 68th minute).			2–1 W	Third Place Match

=== Matches and goals scored at European Championship tournaments ===
Josefine Öqvist appeared at two European Championship tournaments: England 2005 and Sweden 2013.

Goal	Match	Date	Location	Opponent	Lineup	Min	Score	Result	Competition
(England) 2005 European Championship
	1	2005-6-5	Blackpool	Denmark	on 85' (off Schelin)			1–1 D	Group match
	2	2005-6-8	Blackpool	Finland	on 56' (off Schelin)			0–0 D	Group match
	3	2005-6-11	Blackburn	England	on 90+3' (off Svensson)			1–0 W	Group match
	4	2005-6-16	Warrington	Norway	on 90+3' (off Sjögran)			2–3 L	Semi-Final
(Sweden) 2013 European Championship
	5	2013-7-10	Gothenburg	Denmark	off 79' (on Jakobsson)			1–1 D	Group match
	6	2013-7-13	Gothenburg	Finland	off 67' (on Göransson)			5–0 W	Group match
1	7	2013-7-16	Halmstad	Italy	Start	57	3-0	3–1 W	Group match
2	8	2013-7-21	Halmstad	Iceland	off 46' (on Göransson)	14	2-0	4–0 W	Quarter-Final
	9	2013-7-24	Gothenburg	Germany	off 74' (on Jakobsson)			0–1 L	Semi-Final

== Honours ==
Linköpings FC

- Damallsvenskan: Winner 2009
- Svenska Cupen: Winner 2006, 2008, 2009
- Svenska Supercupen: Winner 2009, 2010

=== Country ===
Sweden

- 2003 FIFA Women's World Cup: Runner-up
- 2011 FIFA Women's World Cup: Third place
- 2004 Summer Olympics in Athens: Fourth place
- 2008 Summer Olympics in Beijing: Quarter-final
- UEFA Women's Euro 2005: Semi-finals
- UEFA Women's Euro 2013: Semi-finals

=== Individual ===
- UEFA Women's Championship All-Star Team: 2013
