= Tosin Otubajo =

Nigerian footballer

Personal information
- Full name: Oluwatosin Otubajo
- Date of birth: 16 July 1984 (age 42)
- Place of birth: Ajegunle, Lagos, Nigeria
- Height: 1.70 m (5 ft 7 in)
- Position: Defender

Senior career*
Years	Team	Apps	(Gls)
- Flying Angel
- Vero Bims Queens Lagos
- Confluence Queens
- Bayelsa Queens

International career
- Nigeria
- * Club domestic league appearances and goals

Oluwatosin "Tosin" Otubajo (born 16 July 1984) is a Nigerian former footballer who played as a defender for the Nigeria women's national team. She now have a training of her own called Emmatoad football academy in Lagos since 2013 and she is onepart of the successful woman in the defensive position in Nigeria.she also played for a club in Europe woman's and became the first girl to score against arsenal during her regin

== Career ==
Otubajo was a native of Ajegunle, Lagos, and played as a defender for Flying Angel, Vero Bims Queens Lagos, Confluence Queens and Bayelsa Queens. She was a member of the Nigeria national team, and was included in Nigeria's training camp for the 2000 Summer Olympics in Sydney, Australia. However, she was ultimately cut from the squad. Eight years later, she was included in Nigeria's squad at the 2008 Summer Olympics as an alternate player.
