= Mohammed Noor Al-Deen =

Iraqi association football player

Personal information
- Full name: Mohammed Noor Al-Deen Rahim
- Date of birth: 6 August 1984 (age 42)
- Place of birth: Iraq
- Position: Goalkeeper

Senior career*
Years	Team	Apps	(Gls)
- Al-Sinaa SC
- Al-Naft SC
- Al-Najaf FC

International career
2006-2007	Iraq	1	(0)
- * Club domestic league appearances and goals

Mohammed Noor Al-Deen (born 6 August 1984) is an Iraqi former football goalkeeper who played for Iraq at the 2006 Asian Games.

Noor Al-Deen played for the national team in 2006.
