= Maria Aronsson =

Swedish footballer (born 1983)

Personal information
- Full name: Ida Maria Aronsson
- Date of birth: 23 December 1983 (age 42)
- Place of birth: Vikingstad, Sweden
- Height: 1.76 m (5 ft 9 1/2 in)
- Position: Forward

Youth career
- Västerlösa GoIF
- Malmslätts AIK

Senior career*
Years	Team	Apps	(Gls)
2002–2007	Linköpings FC	121	
2008–2009	LdB FC Malmö	34	(9)

International career^{‡}
2004–2008	Sweden	16	(1)
- * Club domestic league appearances and goals as of 23:59, 31 December 2010 (UTC) ‡ National team caps and goals as of 23:59, 10 May 2013 (UTC)

Ida Maria Aronsson (born 23 December 1983) is a Swedish former footballer who played as a forward for Damallsvenskan clubs Linköpings FC and LdB FC Malmö. She represented the Sweden women's national football team at the 2008 Beijing Olympics.

== Club career ==
Aronsson joined Linköpings in 2002, when they were called BK Kenty, and remained with the team for six seasons, making 121 appearances. She was surprised and disappointed to be released after the 2007 season. Linköpings' management told her that she had finished developing and that their other forwards (Josefine Öqvist, Kosovare Asllani and Jessica Landström) were better equipped to lead the team's trophy quest.

She moved to Damallsvenskan rivals LdB FC Malmö on a two-year contract with an option for a third. After nine goals in 34 games across two seasons, Aronsson declined the contract extension and moved back to live in Linköping. Aged 25, she was starting to look at a career beyond football.

== International career ==
Aronsson's debut for the senior Sweden team came in a 1–1 draw in Finland on 2 October 2004. She scored her first – and only – goal for the national team in a 1–1 friendly draw with England on 9 February 2006 in the Cypriot town of Achna.

In August 2008 Aronsson replaced the injured Josefine Öqvist in the Sweden squad for the 2008 Beijing Olympics. She appeared as an extra time substitute in the Swedes' quarter-final defeat by Germany.
