= Mbieri =

Coordinates: 05°35′00″N 07°03′00″E

Mbieri (originally known as Mbaeri) is a town in southeastern Nigeria. It is named after one of the indigenous Igbo clans that conquered parts of the old Owerri province. Mbieri is in Mbaitoli council of Imo State and it is the biggest of the original nine towns of Mbaitoli. The region surrounding Mbieri is rich in hydrocarbons.

== Town structure and surroundings ==
Mbieri town is made up of the following 19 villages now towns: Achi, Amankuta, Amaulu, Awo, Ebom, Eziome, Obazu, Obokwe, Ohohia, Ubakuru, Umuagwu, Umuahii, Umudagu, Umuduru, Umuneke, Umunjam, Umuobom, Umuomumu and Umuonyeali. Currently Mbieri is divided into the following autonomous communities: Amaike-Mbieri, Awo-Mbieri, Ezi-Mbieri, Ihitte isi-Mbieri, Obazu Mbieri, Obi-Mbieri and Umueze-Mbieri. It has boundary with the following communities: Iho, Akabo and Amatta (Ikeduru), Umuoba, Owalla, Orji, Amakohia, Akwakuma (Uratta, Owerri North), Owerri Nchi Ise (Owerri Municipal), Ubomiri, Ifakala, Orodo and Ogwa (Mbaitoli).

It is about 8 km (it is actually less than 1km considering the close distance between Orji in Owerri North and Umudagu in Mbieri)north of Owerri.
