= Emilia Mendieta =

Argentine footballer and futsal player

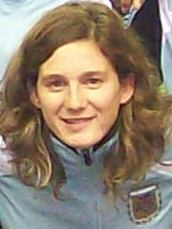
- Emilia Mendieta-Seleccion de fútbol femenino, Copa Mundial FIFA 2007

Personal information
- Full name: Emilia María Mendieta
- Date of birth: 4 February 1988 (age 38)
- Place of birth: Argentina
- Position: Forward

Senior career*
Years	Team	Apps	(Gls)
2008	River Plate		
- Racing (futsal)
2017	Bisceglie (futsal)		

International career
2007–2008	Argentina	0 (?)	(0)
2017	Argentina (futsal)		
- * Club domestic league appearances and goals

Emilia María Mendieta (born 4 February 1988) is an Argentine futsal player and a former footballer who played as a forward.

She was part of the Argentina women's national football team at the 2008 Summer Olympics. On club level she played for River Plate.

== See also ==
- Argentina at the 2008 Summer Olympics
