= Chi-Chi Igbo =

Danish Nigerian footballer

Personal information
- Full name: Chi-chi Igbo
- Date of birth: 1 May 1986 (age 40)
- Height: 1.63 m (5 ft 4 in)
- Position: Forward

Senior career*
Years	Team	Apps	(Gls)
2002–2016	Fortuna Hjørring	270	(200)

International career
2004–2010	Nigeria		
- * Club domestic league appearances and goals

Chi-Chi Igbo (born 1 May 1986) is a retired Danish-Nigerian footballer. The 38-year-old former Super Falcons player Chichi Igbo is a Danish Pro Soccer player based in Denmark. She plays as a forward for Fortuna Hjørring. When she is not on the football field, Chichi creates YouTube videos.

It seems people are more fascinated about her because she is open about her sexuality which is not the case for a lot of gay Nigerians both home and abroad. Chichi has however expressed her pride in being a woman despite her boyish looks. She is known for her boyish lifestyle which has made a lot of people also question her gender.

== Club career ==
Igbo started her career in 2000 with FCT Queens of Abuja. In summer 2002, she graduated with her team the Capital Queens a youth tournament in Denmark which one could win. Igbo herself was named the best player and moved a year later to Fortuna Hjørring in Denmark. In Hjørring at the age of only 15 years, her senior debut in the highest Danish league, in the summer of 2003 series champion was before Hjørring. She was elected in 2005 and 2011 player of the season of the Cup competition. During the seasons 2008/09 and 2009/10 she with her team Fortuna Hjørring won the Danish title.

She decided to retire in 2016, after 14 years at Fortuna Hjørring, where she played 270 appearances, and won four league titles and three cup titles.

== International career ==
Since 2004, she has played for the Nigeria women's national football team. She represented her country at the 2007 FIFA Women's World Cup in China.
