= Ntiero Effiom =

Nigerian football manager

Personal information
- Date of birth: 22 November 1946
- Date of death: 10 September 2014 (aged 67)
- Place of death: Cross River State, Nigeria

Managerial career
- Years: Team
- Pelican Stars
- 2002–2004: Nigeria U19 women
- 2004–2013: Nigeria women

Ntiero Effiom (22 November 1946 – 10 September 2014) was a Nigerian football coach who managed Pelican Stars and the Nigeria women's national football team.
