= Stephanie Puckrin =

New Zealand footballer

Personal information
- Full name: Stephanie Puckrin
- Date of birth: 22 August 1979 (age 47)
- Height: 1.72 m (5 ft 8 in)
- Position: Goalkeeper

International career
Years	Team	Apps	(Gls)
2007–	New Zealand	1	(0)

Stephanie Puckrin (born 22 August 1979) is an association football goalkeeper who represented New Zealand at international level.

Puckrin made her full Football Ferns debut in a 6-1 World Cup qualifying win over Tonga on 9 April 2007, and was included in the New Zealand squad for the 2007 FIFA Women's World Cup finals in China, where they lost to Brazil 0–5, Denmark (0-2) and China (0-2). Puckrin failed to get playing time at the tournament with Jenny Bindon being first choice goalkeeper.
