= Zhang Tong =

Chinese footballer

Personal information
- Date of birth: 3 April 1984 (age 42)
- Position: Midfielder

Senior career*
Years	Team	Apps	(Gls)
- Beijing Chenjian

International career^{‡}
	China	31	(2)
Medal record
Women's football
Representing China
Asian Games
Bronze medal – third place	2006 Doha	Team
- * Club domestic league appearances and goals ‡ National team caps and goals as of 10 September 2007 (before the 2007 FIFA Women's World Cup)

Zhang Tong (born 3 April 1984) is a Chinese women's international footballer who plays as a midfielder. She is a member of the China women's national football team. She was part of the team at the 2007 FIFA Women's World Cup. On club level she plays for Beijing Chenjian in China.
