= Rachael Aladi Ayegba =

Nigerian footballer

Personal information
- Date of birth: 25 June 1986 (age 40)
- Position: Goalkeeper

Senior career*
Years	Team	Apps	(Gls)
- Oladimeji Tigress
- Ufouma Babes
- FCT Queens of Abuja
- Edo Queens
c.2007–2009	Kokkolan Palloveikot	3+	(0+)
2010–2013	PK-35 Vantaa	77	(0)
- Kuopion Palloseura
- GBK Kokkola

International career
2001–?	Nigeria		
- * Club domestic league appearances and goals

Rachael Aladi Ayegba (born 25 June 1986) is a former Nigerian women's international footballer and goalkeeper who debuted domestically in a 2001 match against Namibia and continued to play internationally for multiple Finnish clubs between 2005 and 2016. Ayegba is now a bus driver in London.

== Club career ==
In Nigeria, Ayegba played club football for Oladimeji Tigress, Ufouma Babes, FCT Queens of Abuja, and Edo Queens. In 2005, Ayegba moved to Finland, where she played football for 11 years. At the time of the 2007 FIFA Women's World Cup, she played for Kokkolan Palloveikot in Finland. In Finland, she also played for Kuopion Palloseura, GBK Kokkola and PK-35 Vantaa. She won the 2010, 2011 and 2012 Naisten Liigas with PK-35 Vantaa, as well as the 2012 and 2013 Finnish Women's Cups.

== International career ==
Ayegba made her debut for the Nigeria women's national football team in a 2001 match against Namibia. She missed the 2003 All-Africa Games due to an injury. Ayegba represented Nigeria at the 2007 FIFA Women's World Cup, as well as the 2006 and 2008 African Women's Championships, and the 2007 All-Africa Games.

== Post-career ==
Ayegba retired from football in 2016. She later worked as a coach, and moved to London in 2018. As of 2021, Ayegba worked as a trainee bus driver for Go-Ahead London.
