= Phi Un-hui =

North Korean footballer

Personal information
- Date of birth: 2 August 1985 (age 41)
- Place of birth: North Korea
- Position: Goalkeeper

Senior career*
Years	Team	Apps	(Gls)
- Amrokgang

International career^{‡}
	North Korea	2	(0)
- * Club domestic league appearances and goals ‡ National team caps and goals as of 10 September 2007 (before the 2007 FIFA Women's World Cup)

Phi Un-hui (Korean: 피은희; born 2 August 1985) is a North Korean footballer who played as a goalkeeper for the North Korea women's national football team. She was part of the team at the 2007 FIFA Women's World Cup. At the club level, she played for Amrokgang in North Korea.
