= Thaís (footballer, born 1987) =

Brazilian footballer

Thaís Helena da Silva (born 19 June 1987) is a Brazilian professional footballer who plays as a goalkeeper for Série A2 club Ceará SC. She has been called up to the Brazil women's national team.

== Early life ==
Thaís Helena was born in Itu, São Paulo.

== International career ==
Thaís Helena played for Brazil at the 2004 FIFA U-19 Women's World Championship in Thailand.
