= Jang Yong-ok =

North Korean footballer (born 1982)

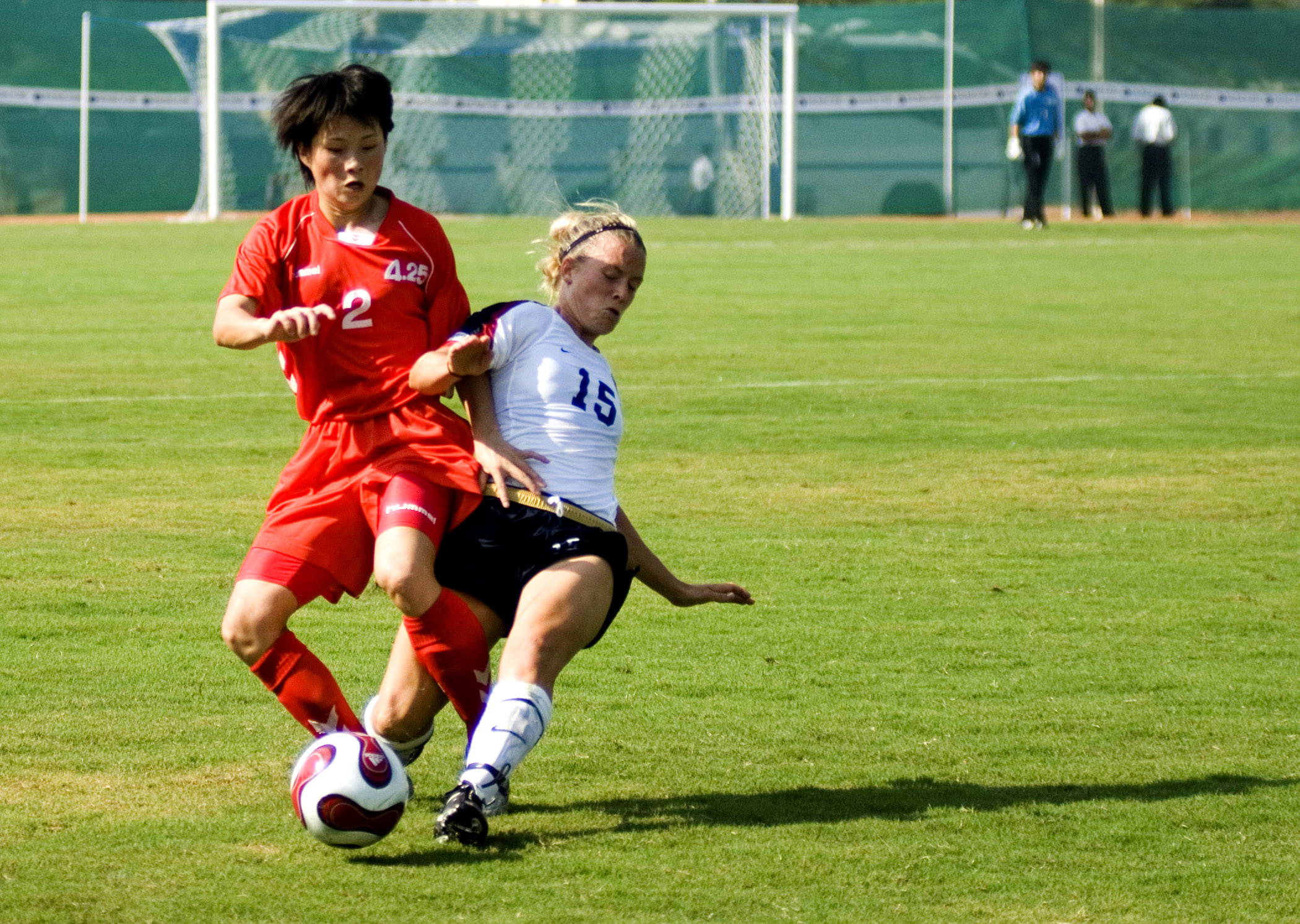

Personal information
- Date of birth: 17 September 1982 (age 44)
- Place of birth: North Korea
- Position: Defender

Senior career*
Years	Team	Apps	(Gls)
2008	April 25		

International career
2008	North Korea	20 (?)	(0)
- * Club domestic league appearances and goals

Jang Yong-ok (Korean: 장영옥; born 17 September 1982) is a North Korean former football defender. She was part of the North Korea women's national football team at the 2008 Summer Olympics. At the club level, she played for April 25.

== See also ==
- North Korea at the 2008 Summer Olympics
