= Merissa Smith =

New Zealand footballer (born 1990)

Personal information
- Full name: Merissa Louise Smith
- Date of birth: 11 November 1990 (age 35)
- Place of birth: Tauranga, New Zealand
- Height: 1.71 m (5 ft 7 in)
- Position: Striker

Team information
- Current team: Rutgers Scarlet Knights

Senior career*
| Years | Team | Apps | (Gls) |
- Three Kings United
- Rutgers Scarlet Knights

International career^{‡}
| 2006– | New Zealand U-20 | | |
| 2006– | New Zealand | 15 | (1) |
- * Club domestic league appearances and goals ‡ National team caps and goals as of 15 January 2009

Merissa Smith (born 11 November 1990) is an association football player who represented New Zealand at international level.

Smith made her full Football Ferns debut in a 0–3 loss to China on 14 November 2006, and represented New Zealand at the 2007 FIFA Women's World Cup finals in China, where they lost to Brazil 0–5, Denmark (0–2) and China (0–2).

Smith was also included in the New Zealand squad for the 2008 Summer Olympics where they drew with Japan (2–2) before losing to Norway (0–1) and Brazil (0–4).

She appeared in a group game for New Zealand at the 2006 Women's U-20 World Cup finals, and again represented the young ferns at the 2008 Women's U-20 World Cup in Chile.
