= Ulunma Jerome =

Nigerian footballer

Personal information
- Date of birth: 11 April 1988 (age 38)
- Place of birth: Mbieri, Nigeria
- Height: 1.60 m (5 ft 3 in)
- Position: Defender

Senior career*
Years	Team	Apps	(Gls)
2007–2009	Rivers Angels		
2010–2011	Piteå	26	(0)
- * Club domestic league appearances and goals

Ulunma Jerome (born 11 April 1988) is a Nigerian footballer who plays as a defender. She has also made several appearances for the Nigeria national team.

== Club career ==
Ulunma was born in Mbieri, Nigeria. She competed in the 2008 summer Olympics games with the Nigeria team as a defender.

In the year 02/2011 to 12/2011 she played with the Pitea IF as a defender, likewise from 07/2007 to 01/2011 she played with the Rivers Angels still as a defender.

Her debut was in the Damallsvenskan on 13 April 2011 against Linköping.

== International career ==
Ulunma participated in the FIFA league world cup, in the FIFA league olympics games and also in the FIFA league friendlies.

Women's Soccer Africa: 2011 FIFA WWC - Ulumma has come of age and would be best remembered for her defence splitting pass to Perpetua Nkwocha that resulted in Nigeria's opening goal against Equatorial Guinea in the final of the Africa Women Championship last year in South Africa.
