= Therese Lundin (footballer) =

Swedish footballer

Personal information
- Full name: Therese Lundin
- Date of birth: March 3, 1979 (age 47)
- Place of birth: Karlskrona, Sweden
- Height: 1.68 m (5 ft 6 in)
- Position: Striker

Youth career
- Rödeby AIF

Senior career*
| Years | Team | Apps | (Gls) |
| 1995–1997 | Östers IF | | |
| 1999–2008 | Malmö FF | 184 | (93) |
| 2009 | Chicago Red Eleven | | |

International career^{‡}
| 1999–2008 | Sweden | 57 | (11) |
- * Club domestic league appearances and goals ‡ National team caps and goals as of 2017

Therese Lundin (born March 3, 1979) is a Swedish former football forward who played for Malmö FF and the Swedish national team. She is nicknamed Ludde.

Lundin retired in 2008 after suffering persistent knee injuries. She made a brief comeback in 2009 with Chicago Red Eleven.
