= Maureen Mmadu =

Nigerian footballer

Personal information
- Full name: Maureen Nkeiruka Mmadu
- Date of birth: 7 May 1975 (age 51)
- Place of birth: Onitsha, Nigeria
- Height: 1.78 m (5 ft 10 in)
- Position: Midfielder

Senior career*
Years	Team	Apps	(Gls)
- Ado Babes
- Pelican Queens
- Jegede Babes
- IL Sandviken
- Klepp IL
2006	QBIK		
2007	Linköpings FC		
2008	Amazon Grimstad		
2010	Kolbotn IL		
2011–2013	Avaldsnes IL		

International career^{‡}
1993–2011	Nigeria	101	
- * Club domestic league appearances and goals ‡ National team caps and goals as of 17:08, 31 August 2014 (UTC)

Maureen Nkeiruka Mmadu (born 7 May 1975) is a Nigerian football coach and former international who played as a midfielder. As a player she most recently represented Avaldsnes IL, a First Division team based on Norway's west coast. She played for several other teams in Norway's Toppserien as well for Linköpings FC and QBIK in the Swedish Damallsvenskan.

== Career ==
She previously played for Klepp IL in the Norwegian Toppserien. Mmadu played for Kolbotn in Oslo, Norway, for the 2010 season, helping them to 3rd place in the Toppserien league. She can be seen playing for Avaldsnes IL in an off-season tournament in Oslo on 5 February 2012

== International career ==
She is also a member for Nigeria and has made more than 100 appearances for the Nigeria women's national football team, including appearing at four FIFA Women's World Cups and has competed in the 2000 and 2004 Summer Olympics.

Contrary to reports that she played more than 100 games for the Nigeria women's national football team, the Nigeria Football Federation has said she only played 52 games.
