= Rachel Howard (footballer) =

New Zealand footballer (born 1977)

Personal information
- Full name: Rachel Howard
- Date of birth: 30 November 1977 (age 48)
- Height: 1.75 m (5 ft 9 in)
- Position: Goalkeeper

International career
Years	Team	Apps	(Gls)
1998–2008	New Zealand	14	(0)

Rachel Howard (born 30 November 1977) is an association football goalkeeper who represented New Zealand at international level.

Howard made her Football Ferns debut in a 0–5 loss to the United States on 28 May 1998, and represented New Zealand at the 2007 FIFA Women's World Cup finals in China, where they lost to Brazil 0–5, Denmark (0-2) and China (0-2). Howard was one of only 3 squad members to not get any playing time in the Tournament.

Howard was also included in the New Zealand squad for the 2008 Summer Olympics where they drew with Japan (2-2) before losing to Norway(0-1) and Brazil (0-4). Again, Howard did not play in the tournament with Jenny Bindon being first choice goalkeeper.
