= Karolina Westberg =

Swedish footballer (born 1978)

Personal information
- Full name: Anna Karolina Walfridsson Westberg
- Birth name: Anna Karolina Westberg
- Date of birth: 16 May 1978 (age 48)
- Place of birth: Kristianstad, Sweden
- Height: 1.66 m (5 ft 5 in)
- Position: Defender

Youth career
- Skillinge IF

Senior career*
Years	Team	Apps	(Gls)
1999–2004	Malmö FF Dam		
2005–2009	Umeå IK	253	(6)

International career^{‡}
1997–2008	Sweden	126	(2)
- * Club domestic league appearances and goals ‡ National team caps and goals as of 29 December 2019

Anna Karolina Walfridsson Westberg (née Westberg; born 16 May 1978) is a former Swedish footballer who played as a defender for Malmö FF Dam, Umeå IK and the Swedish national team.

== International career ==
Karolina Westberg featured for Sweden in three World Cups (USA 1999, USA 2003, China 2007) and two Olympic Games (Sydney 2000 Olympics, Athens 2004.) She was on the roster for the 2008 Beijing Olympics but did not appear in a match. Westberg played in three European Championship tournaments: Norway/Sweden 1997, Germany 2001, and England 2005.

== Personal life ==
Westberg was born in Kristianstad, and now uses the surname Walfridsson Westberg.
