= Faith Michael =

Nigerian footballer

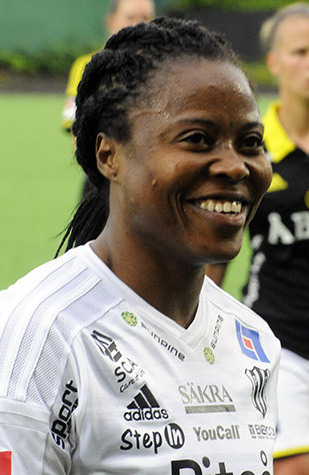
- Michael in 2015

Personal information
- Date of birth: 28 February 1987 (age 39)
- Place of birth: Port Harcourt, Nigeria
- Height: 1.72 m (5 ft 8 in)
- Position: Defender

Senior career*
Years	Team	Apps	(Gls)
2000–2001	Novia Queens FC		
2001–2004	Bayelsa Queens FC		
2004–2005	Klepp IL		
2004–2006	QBIK		
2007	Eskilstuna United DFF		
2009–2010	Linköpings FC	37	(2)
2011–2025	Piteå IF	307	(9)

International career
2004–	Nigeria	53	(0)
Medal record
Representing Nigeria
Women's football
Africa Women Cup of Nations
Third place	2008 Equatorial Guinea
Winner	2016 Cameroon
Winner	2018 Ghana
- * Club domestic league appearances and goals as of 14 October 2018

Faith Michael (née Ikidi; born 28 February 1987) is a Nigerian footballer who plays as a defender for the Nigeria women's national team.

== Early life ==
Born in Port Harcourt, Ikidi was raised in Edo State.

== Club career ==
In 2006, Ikidi was one of three Nigerian players to be the first set of Africans to play in the Swedish Championship while playing for QBIK.

In December 2015, Ikidi signed a two-year extension with Piteå.

== International career ==
Ikiri has represented Nigeria on the senior national team since 2004. In November 2006, she helped the team win its fifth African Women's Championship after defeating Ghana 1–0 in the final.

== Honors and awards ==
=== International ===
Nigeria

- Africa Women Cup of Nations Winner: 2006, 2016, 2018

Team
with Linköping FC

- Damallsvenskan: 2009
- Super Cup Women: 2010

Individual

- Damallsvenskan Defender of the Year: 2015

Team
with Piteå

- Damallsvenskan: 2018

== Personal life ==
Ikidi married husband Nick Michael on 12 December 2015.
