= Kim Ok-sim =

North Korean footballer (born 1987)

Personal information
- Date of birth: 2 July 1987 (age 39)
- Place of birth: North Korea
- Position: Forward

Senior career*
| Years | Team | Apps | (Gls) |
| 2008 | Rimyongsu | | |

International career
| 2008 | North Korea | 23 (?) | (5) |
- * Club domestic league appearances and goals

- Kim Ok-sim
- Hangul: 김옥심
- RR: Gim Oksim
- MR: Kim Oksim

Kim Ok-sim (born 2 July 1987) is a North Korean football forward who played for the North Korea women's national football team at the 2008 Summer Olympics. At the club level, she played for Rimyongsu.

== See also ==
- North Korea at the 2008 Summer Olympics
