= Christie George =

Nigerian footballer

Personal information
- Date of birth: 10 May 1984 (age 42)
- Place of birth: Nigeria
- Position: Forward

Senior career*
Years	Team	Apps	(Gls)
2008	Pelican Stars		

International career
2008	Nigeria	0 (?)	(0)
- * Club domestic league appearances and goals

Christie George (born 10 May 1984) is a Nigerian former footballer who played as a forward for the Nigeria women's national team.

She was part of the national team at the 2008 Summer Olympics.

== See also ==
- Nigeria at the 2008 Summer Olympics
