= Lilian Cole =

Nigerian footballer

Personal information
- Date of birth: 1 August 1985 (age 41)
- Place of birth: Nigeria
- Position: Defender

Senior career*
Years	Team	Apps	(Gls)
2008	Delta Queens		

International career
2002	Nigeria U-19		
2008	Nigeria	0 (?)	(0)
- * Club domestic league appearances and goals

Lilian Cole (born 1 August 1985) is a Nigerian football defender who played for the Nigeria women's national football team at the 2008 Summer Olympics. She has previously also played for Delta Queens.

== See also ==
- Nigeria at the 2008 Summer Olympics
