= Han Wenxia =

Chinese footballer

Personal information
- Date of birth: August 23, 1976 (age 50)
- Place of birth: Dalian, Liaoning
- Position: Goalkeeper

International career
Years	Team	Apps	(Gls)
- China
Medal record
Women's football
Representing China
Asian Games
Bronze medal – third place	2006 Doha	Team

Han Wenxia (born August 23, 1976 in Dalian, Liaoning) is a Chinese football player who competed for the national team in the 2008 Summer Olympics. Her position is that of goalkeeper.

== Major performances ==
- 1994/1997/2007 National League - 1st/2nd/2nd
- 1995/2004/2007 National Championship - 1st/2nd/1st
- 1995 National Super Champions Cup - 1st
- 1999 World Cup - 2nd
- 1999/2008 Asian Cup - 1st/2nd
- 2004 Olympic Qualification Asian Zone - 1st
- 2005 National Games - 2nd

== Personal life ==
Her brother Han Wenhai was a goalkeeper for the China national football team.
