= Efioanwan Ekpo =

Nigerian footballer

Medal record

Women's Football

Representing Nigeria

African Championships
Gold medal – first place	2006 Nigeria	Nigeria

Efioanwan Ekpo (born 25 January 1984) is a Nigerian footballer who played for the Nigeria women's national football team. Ekpo competed at the 2003 World Cup, 2004 Summer Olympics, 2006 African Championship, 2007 World Cup and 2008 Summer Olympics.
