= Zhang Yanru =

Chinese footballer

Medal record

Women's football

Representing China

Asian Games
Bronze medal – third place	2006 Doha	Team

Zhang Yanru (Chinese: 张艳茹; born January 10, 1987) is a Chinese football (soccer) player who competed in the 2008 Summer Olympics. Her position is that of goalkeeper.

Zhang played in the U-20's China team until 2007, when she received her first call up to the China team proper. She played two of the four matches, including the quarter-final, in that year's World Cup. She also competed in the 2008 Beijing Olympics, which are open to all ages for the female squads.

== See also ==
- List of women's footballers with 100 or more international caps
