= Weng Xinzhi =

Chinese footballer

Medal record

Women's football

Representing China

Asian Games
Bronze medal – third place	2006 Doha	Team

Weng Xinzhi (Chinese: 翁新芝; pinyin: Wēng Xīnzhì; born June 15, 1988) is a Chinese football (soccer) player who competed in the 2008 Summer Olympics. She plays as a defender.

Weng played in the U-20's China team in 2004 and 2006 World Cups, and was promoted the senior Chinese team in 2007, when she played two matches during the team's qualifying campaign for the World Cup. Despite being picked for the finals, she did not make any appearances. Her first major tournament with the national squad in which she competed was the 2008 Summer Olympics, which were held in China.
