= Jong Pok-sim =

North Korean footballer (born 1985)

Personal information
- Date of birth: 31 July 1985 (age 41)
- Place of birth: Pyongyang, North Korea
- Position: Defender

Senior career*
Years	Team	Apps	(Gls)
- 25 April

International career^{‡}
	North Korea	6	(0)
- * Club domestic league appearances and goals ‡ National team caps and goals as of 26 June 2011 (before the 2011 FIFA Women's World Cup)

Jong Pok-sim (Korean: 정복심; born 31 July 1985) is a North Korean footballer who played as a defender for the North Korea women's national football team. She was part of the team at the 2007 FIFA Women's World Cup and 2011 FIFA Women's World Cup. At the club level, she plays for 25 April in North Korea.

== International goals ==
No.	Date	Venue	Opponent	Score	Result	Competition
1.	24 February 2004	Brisbane, Australia	New Zealand	8–0	11–0	2004 Australia Cup
2.	24 February 2004	Brisbane, Australia	New Zealand	9–0	11–0	2004 Australia Cup
3.	20 September 2010	Guangzhou, China	Thailand	1–0	2–0	2010 Asian Games
