= Anna Paulson (footballer) =

Swedish footballer (born 1984)

Personal information
- Full name: Anna Sofia Perpetua Paulsson
- Date of birth: 29 February 1984 (age 42)
- Place of birth: Umeå, Sweden
- Height: 1.70 m (5 ft 7 in)
- Position: Right-back

Youth career
- 2000: Gimonäs CK

Senior career*
Years	Team	Apps	(Gls)
2001–2011	Umeå IK		

International career^{‡}
2004–2010	Sweden	45	(2)
- * Club domestic league appearances and goals as of 15 June 2013 ‡ National team caps and goals as of 15 June 2013

Anna Sofia Perpetua Paulsson (born 29 February 1984) is a former Swedish football player. During her career she played as a defender for Umeå IK and the Swedish national team. Paulson debuted for the national team on 10 February 2004 against Finland where they tied 1–1.

== Career ==
Since her debut for Umeå in 2001, Paulson was an integral part of the team's defence. Throughout her 10 seasons with Umeå, they won one Super Cup, two UEFA Women's Cups, four Swedish Cups, and five Swedish championship gold medals.

In 2011 Umeå gave Paulson a rehabilitation contract to prove her fitness, but released her during the season. A tribunal later ruled that they broke the contract and awarded Paulson 138,000 kronor.
