= Om Jong-ran =

North Korean footballer

Personal information
- Date of birth: 10 October 1985 (age 41)
- Place of birth: North Korea
- Position: Defender

Senior career*
Years	Team	Apps	(Gls)
2008	April 25		

International career
2008	North Korea	60 (?)	(0)
- * Club domestic league appearances and goals

Om Jong-ran (Korean: 엄정란; born 10 October 1985) is a North Korean football defender who played for the North Korea women's national football team at the 2008 Summer Olympics.

== See also ==
- North Korea at the 2008 Summer Olympics
