= Jon Myong-hui =

North Korean footballer (born 1986)

Personal information
- Date of birth: 7 August 1986 (age 40)
- Place of birth: North Korea
- Position: Goalkeeper

Senior career*
| Years | Team | Apps | (Gls) |
| 2008 | Rimyongsu | | |

International career
| 2008 | North Korea | 45 (?) | (0) |
- * Club domestic league appearances and goals

- Jon Myong-hui
- Hangul: 전명희
- RR: Jeon Myeonghui
- MR: Chŏn Myŏnghŭi

Jon Myong-hui (Korean: 전명희; born 7 August 1986) is a female North Korean football goalkeeper.

She was part of the North Korea women's national football team at the 2008 Summer Olympics.

== See also ==
- North Korea at the 2008 Summer Olympics
