= Sonu Kyong-sun =

North Korean footballer

Personal information
- Date of birth: 28 September 1983 (age 43)
- Place of birth: North Korea
- Position: Defender

Senior career*
Years	Team	Apps	(Gls)
2008	April 25		

International career
2008	North Korea	55 (?)	(35)
Korean name
Hangul	선우경순
RR	Seonu Gyeongsun
MR	Sŏnu Kyŏngsun
- * Club domestic league appearances and goals

Sonu Kyong-sun (born 28 September 1983) is a North Korean football defender who played for the North Korea women's national football team at the 2008 Summer Olympics. At the club level, she played for April 25.

== See also ==
- North Korea at the 2008 Summer Olympics
