= Linda Forsberg =

Swedish footballer (born 1985)

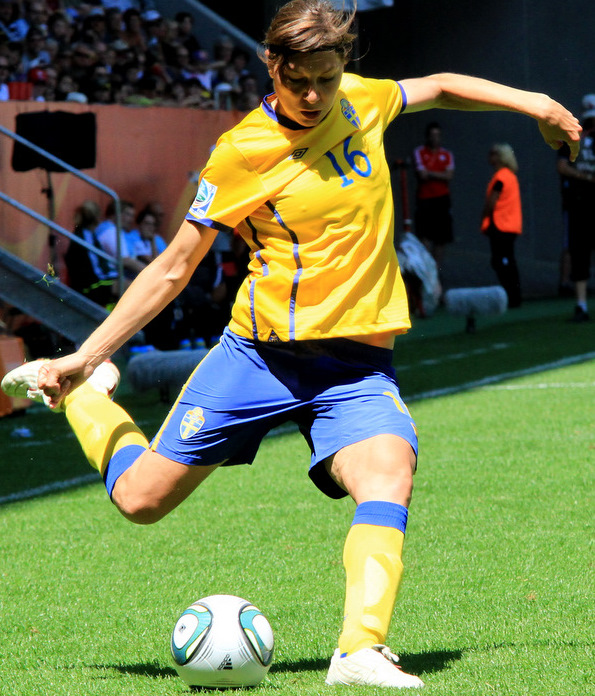

Personal information
- Full name: Linda Forsberg
- Date of birth: 19 June 1985 (age 41)
- Place of birth: Upplands Väsby, Sweden
- Height: 1.77 m (5 ft 10 in)
- Position: Winger

Youth career
- Bollstanäs SK

Senior career*
Years	Team	Apps	(Gls)
2003–2006	Hammarby IF		
2006–2009	Djurgårdens IF (Note: 2006 as Djurgården/Älvsjö.)	83	(21)
2009–2011	LdB FC	55	(15)

International career^{‡}
2007–2011	Sweden	33	(4)
Medal record
Women's football
Representing Sweden
FIFA Women's World Cup
Bronze medal – third place	2011 Germany	Team
- * Club domestic league appearances and goals as of 15 November 2011 ‡ National team caps and goals as of 2 July 2011

Linda Maria "Foppa" Forsberg (born 19 June 1985) is a former Swedish footballer.

Throughout her career she played for Hammarby IF, Djurgårdens IF and LdB Malmö in Sweden's Damallsvenskan. As a member of the Swedish national team, she played in the 2007 and 2011 World Cups and the 2008 Summer Olympics.

In 2007, Forsberg was voted as the Best Rookie of the Year in Sweden. She subsequently won two leagues with LdB Malmö.

She is not related to Emil Forsberg.
