= Song Jong-sun =

North Korean footballer

Personal information
- Date of birth: March 11, 1981 (age 45)
- Place of birth: Pyongyang, North Korea
- Height: 1.60 m (5 ft 3 in)
- Positions: Defender; full back

Team information
- Current team: Amnokkang Sports Club
- Number: 5

Senior career*
Years	Team	Apps	(Gls)
Present	Amrokgang Sports Club	78	(8)

International career^{‡}
2003–	North Korea	86	(0)
- * Club domestic league appearances and goals as of 1 November 2007 ‡ National team caps and goals as of 2 July 2011

- Song Jong-sun
- Hangul: 송정순
- RR: Song Jeongsun
- MR: Song Chŏngsun

Song Jong-sun (Korean pronunciation: [soŋ.dzʌŋ.sun] or [soŋ] [tsʌŋ.sun]; born 11 March 1981 in North Korea) is a North Korean female football player (defender) who plays for Amnokkang Sports Club.

Song has made several appearances for the North Korea women's national football team, including playing at the 2003 and 2007 FIFA Women's World Cup. She also played at the 2008 Summer Olympics.

In July 2011, Song, along with other members of the national team, tested positive for a banned steroid, and were subsequently banned for 14 months from international competitions by FIFA.
