= 2007 FIFA Women's World Cup Group D =

Football tournament group stage

Group D was one of four groups of nations competing at the 2007 FIFA Women's World Cup. The group's first round of matches began on 12 September and its last matches were played on 20 September 2007. Most matches were played at the Wuhan Stadium in Wuhan. Emerging powers Brazil topped the group with a 100% record, joined in the second round by hosts China.

== Standings ==
Pos	Team	Pld	W	D	L	GF	GA	GD	Pts	Qualification
1	Brazil	3	3	0	0	10	0	+10	9	Advance to knockout stage
2	China (H)	3	2	0	1	5	6	−1	6	Advance to knockout stage
3	Denmark	3	1	0	2	4	4	0	3	
4	New Zealand	3	0	0	3	0	9	−9	0	

Source: FIFA
Rules for classification: Group stage tiebreakers
(H) Hosts

== Matches ==
All times are local (UTC+8)

=== New Zealand vs Brazil ===
12 September 2007
17:00

New Zealand	0–5	Brazil
	Report	Daniela 10'; Cristiane 54'; Marta 74', 90+3'; Renata Costa 86'

Wuhan Sports Centre Stadium, Wuhan
Attendance: 50,800
Referee: Pannipar Kamnueng (Thailand)

New Zealand:
GK	1	Jenny Bindon
RB	2	Ria Percival	(yellow card) 25'
CB	5	Abby Erceg
CB	6	Rebecca Smith (c)
LB	4	Katie Hoyle		(substituted off) 66'
CM	8	Hayley Moorwood
CM	16	Emma Humphries		(substituted off) 72'
RW	15	Maia Jackman
AM	19	Emily McColl
LW	13	Ali Riley
CF	9	Wendi Henderson		(substituted off) 46'
Substitutions:
FW	17	Rebecca Tegg		(substituted on) 46'
FW	20	Merissa Smith		(substituted on) 66'
FW	7	Zoe Thompson		(substituted on) 72'
Manager:
(England) John Herdman

Brazil:
GK	1	Andréia
CB	3	Aline (c)
CB	5	Renata Costa
CB	4	Tânia
RM	16	Simone
CM	8	Formiga
CM	20	Ester
LM	9	Maycon	(substituted off) 78'
AM	7	Daniela
CF	11	Cristiane	(substituted off) 84'
CF	10	Marta
Substitutions:
DF	6	Rosana	(substituted on) 78'
MF	18	Pretinha	(substituted on) 84'
Manager:
(Brazil) Jorge Barcellos

=== China vs Denmark ===
12 September 2007
20:00

China	3–2	Denmark
Li Jie 31'; Bi Yan 50'; Song Xiaoli 88'	Report	Nielsen 51'; Sørensen 87'

Wuhan Sports Centre Stadium, Wuhan
Attendance: 50,800
Referee: Dianne Ferreira-James (Guyana)

China:
GK	18	Han Wenxia
CB	15	Zhou Gaoping		(substituted off) 68'
CB	3	Li Jie (c)		(substituted off) 90+3'
CB	11	Pu Wei
RM	4	Wang Kun
CM	6	Xie Caixia	(yellow card) 89'
CM	12	Qu Feifei		(substituted off) 58'
LM	7	Bi Yan
RF	8	Pan Lina
CF	9	Han Duan
LF	10	Ma Xiaoxu
Substitutions:
MF	5	Song Xiaoli		(substituted on) 58'
DF	19	Zhang Ying		(substituted on) 68'
DF	16	Liu Yali		(substituted on) 90+3'
Manager:
(Sweden) Marika Domanski-Lyfors

Denmark:
GK	1	Heidi Johansen
CB	2	Mia Olsen
CB	4	Gitte Andersen
CB	5	Bettina Falk
DM	3	Katrine Pedersen (c)
RM	8	Julie Rydahl Bukh
CM	15	Mariann Gajhede Knudsen		(substituted off) 75'
CM	7	Cathrine Paaske Sørensen	(yellow card) 80'
LM	10	Anne Dot Eggers Nielsen
CF	9	Maiken Pape	(yellow card) 86'
CF	13	Johanna Rasmussen		(substituted off) 75'
Substitutions:
FW	11	Merete Pedersen		(substituted on) 75'
MF	12	Stine Dimun		(substituted on) 75'
Manager:
(Denmark) Kenneth Heiner-Møller

=== Denmark vs New Zealand ===
15 September 2007
17:00

Denmark	2–0	New Zealand
K. Pedersen 61'; Sørensen 66'	Report

Wuhan Sports Centre Stadium, Wuhan
Attendance: 54,000
Referee: Mayumi Oiwa (Japan)

Denmark:
GK	1	Heidi Johansen
CB	2	Mia Olsen
CB	4	Gitte Andersen
CB	5	Bettina Falk
DM	3	Katrine Pedersen (c)
RM	8	Julie Rydahl Bukh
CM	15	Mariann Gajhede Knudsen	(substituted off) 46'
CM	7	Cathrine Paaske Sørensen	(substituted off) 86'
LM	10	Anne Dot Eggers Nielsen
CF	11	Merete Pedersen
CF	13	Johanna Rasmussen	(substituted off) 72'
Substitutions:
FW	9	Maiken Pape	(substituted on) 46'
MF	20	Camilla Sand Andersen	(substituted on) 72'
MF	17	Janne Madsen	(substituted on) 86'
Manager:
(Denmark) Kenneth Heiner-Møller

New Zealand:
GK	1	Jenny Bindon	(yellow card) 90+1'
CB	5	Abby Erceg	(yellow card) 88'
CB	11	Marlies Oostdam
CB	6	Rebecca Smith (c)
RWB	15	Maia Jackman	(yellow card) 60'
LWB	13	Ali Riley
DM	2	Ria Percival		(substituted off) 70'
RM	8	Hayley Moorwood		(substituted off) 87'
LM	18	Priscilla Duncan
AM	19	Emily McColl
CF	9	Wendi Henderson		(substituted off) 64'
Substitutions:
FW	17	Rebecca Tegg		(substituted on) 64'
MF	16	Emma Humphries		(substituted on) 70'
MF	10	Annalie Longo		(substituted on) 87'
Manager:
(England) John Herdman

=== Brazil vs China ===
15 September 2007
20:00

Brazil	4–0	China
Marta 42', 70'; Cristiane 47', 48'	Report

Wuhan Sports Centre Stadium, Wuhan
Attendance: 54,000
Referee: Jennifer Bennett (United States)

Brazil:
GK	1	Andréia
CB	3	Aline (c)	(yellow card) 41'
CB	5	Renata Costa	(yellow card) 61'
CB	4	Tânia
RM	2	Elaine
CM	8	Formiga		(substituted off) 89'
CM	20	Ester
LM	9	Maycon
AM	7	Daniela	(yellow card) 10'	(substituted off) 79'
CF	11	Cristiane		(substituted off) 85'
CF	10	Marta
Substitutions:
DF	6	Rosana		(substituted on) 79'
MF	15	Kátia		(substituted on) 85'
DF	16	Simone		(substituted on) 89'
Manager:
(Brazil) Jorge Barcellos

China:
GK	18	Han Wenxia
CB	16	Liu Yali		(substituted off) 57'
CB	3	Li Jie
CB	11	Pu Wei	(yellow card) 27'
RM	4	Wang Kun
CM	6	Xie Caixia		(substituted off) 67'
CM	5	Song Xiaoli
LM	7	Bi Yan
RF	8	Pan Lina		(substituted off) 52'
CF	9	Han Duan (c)
LF	10	Ma Xiaoxu
Substitutions:
MF	20	Zhang Tong	(yellow card) 53'	(substituted on) 52'
DF	15	Zhou Gaoping		(substituted on) 57'
FW	17	Liu Sa		(substituted on) 67'
Manager:
(Sweden) Marika Domanski-Lyfors

=== China vs New Zealand ===
20 September 2007 (Note: The Brazil v Denmark match, originally scheduled on 19 September was postponed to the following day due to Typhoon Wipha. FIFA also delayed the China v New Zealand match, originally scheduled on 19 September. This was to allow for simultaneous kick-off times on the final matchday of the group, after it was confirmed that weather conditions would not affect the rescheduling.)
20:00

China	2–0	New Zealand
Li Jie 57'; Xie Caixia 79'	Report

Tianjin Olympic Center Stadium, Tianjin
Attendance: 55,832
Referee: Dagmar Damková (Czech Republic)

China:
GK	1	Zhang Yanru
CB	15	Zhou Gaoping		(substituted off) 65'
CB	3	Li Jie
CB	11	Pu Wei (c)
RWB	8	Pan Lina		(substituted off) 60'
LWB	10	Ma Xiaoxu
CM	4	Wang Kun
CM	6	Xie Caixia
CM	7	Bi Yan
CF	14	Zhang Ouying		(substituted off) 88'
CF	9	Han Duan
Substitutions:
MF	20	Zhang Tong		(substituted on) 60'
DF	16	Liu Yali	(yellow card) 72'	(substituted on) 65'
FW	17	Liu Sa		(substituted on) 88'
Manager:
(Sweden) Marika Domanski-Lyfors

New Zealand:
GK	1	Jenny Bindon
CB	5	Abby Erceg
CB	11	Marlies Oostdam
CB	6	Rebecca Smith (c)
RWB	15	Maia Jackman
LWB	13	Ali Riley
DM	2	Ria Percival		(substituted off) 73'
RM	8	Hayley Moorwood
LM	18	Priscilla Duncan	(yellow card) 56'
AM	19	Emily McColl		(substituted off) 82'
CF	9	Wendi Henderson	(yellow card) 25'	(substituted off) 62'
Substitutions:
FW	7	Zoe Thompson		(substituted on) 62'
FW	20	Merissa Smith		(substituted on) 73'
MF	14	Simone Ferrara		(substituted on) 82'
Manager:
(England) John Herdman

=== Brazil vs Denmark ===
20 September 2007
20:00

Brazil	1–0	Denmark
Pretinha 90+1'	Report

Yellow Dragon Stadium, Hangzhou
Attendance: 43,817
Referee: Kari Seitz (United States)

Brazil:
GK	1	Andréia
RB	2	Elaine
CB	13	Mônica	(yellow card) 76'
CB	4	Tânia
LB	9	Maycon
DM	16	Simone
RM	8	Formiga (c)
LM	20	Ester
AM	7	Daniela		(substituted off) 88'
CF	11	Cristiane		(substituted off) 61'
CF	10	Marta
Substitutions:
MF	18	Pretinha		(substituted on) 61'
DF	6	Rosana		(substituted on) 88'
Manager:
(Brazil) Jorge Barcellos

Denmark:
GK	1	Heidi Johansen
CB	20	Camilla Sand Andersen		(substituted off) 65'
CB	4	Gitte Andersen
CB	3	Katrine Pedersen (c)	(yellow card) 42'
RWB	2	Mia Olsen
LWB	18	Christina Ørntoft
RM	8	Julie Rydahl Bukh		(substituted off) 65'
CM	15	Mariann Gajhede Knudsen		(substituted off) 79'
CM	7	Cathrine Paaske Sørensen
LM	10	Anne Dot Eggers Nielsen
CF	9	Maiken Pape
Substitutions:
FW	13	Johanna Rasmussen		(substituted on) 65'
MF	12	Stine Dimun		(substituted on) 65'
FW	11	Merete Pedersen		(substituted on) 79'
Manager:
(Denmark) Kenneth Heiner-Møller

== See also ==
- Brazil at the FIFA Women's World Cup
- China at the FIFA Women's World Cup
- Denmark at the FIFA Women's World Cup
- New Zealand at the FIFA Women's World Cup
