= 2004 FIFA U-19 Women's World Championship squads =

This article lists the team squads of the 2004 FIFA U-19 Women's World Championship, held in Thailand from 10 to 27 November 2004.

== Group A ==
=== Australia ===
Coach: Adrian Santrac

Australia took a squad of 21 players.

| No. | Pos. | Player | Date of birth (age) | Caps | Club |
|---|---|---|---|---|---|
| 1 | GK | Alison Logue | 6 March 1987 (aged 17) | | (Australia) Northern NSW Pride |
| 2 | DF | Caitlin Cooper | 12 February 1988 (aged 16) | | (Australia) NSW Sapphires |
| 3 | DF | Kim Carroll | 2 September 1987 (aged 17) | | (Australia) Queensland Sting |
| 4 | DF | Emma Davison (captain) | 4 May 1985 (aged 19) | | (Australia) Queensland Sting |
| 5 | DF | Ellen Beaumont | 14 July 1985 (aged 19) | | (Australia) Queensland Sting |
| 6 | MF | Sally Shipard | 20 October 1987 (aged 17) | | (Australia) NSW Sapphires |
| 7 | FW | Jenna Tristram | 28 October 1986 (aged 18) | | (Australia) Northern NSW Pride |
| 8 | MF | Lauren Colthorpe | 25 October 1985 (aged 19) | | (Australia) Northern NSW Pride |
| 9 | FW | Selin Kuralay | 25 January 1985 (aged 19) | | (Australia) Queensland Sting |
| 10 | MF | Collette McCallum | 26 March 1986 (aged 18) | | (Australia) Western Waves |
| 11 | FW | Catherine Cannuli | 3 March 1986 (aged 18) | | (Australia) NSW Sapphires |
| 12 | DF | Julia Bazi | 20 October 1985 (aged 19) | | (Australia) NSW Sapphires |
| 13 | DF | Danielle Brogan | 28 June 1988 (aged 16) | | (Australia) NSW Sapphires |
| 14 | DF | Nicole Somi | 19 January 1987 (aged 17) | | (Australia) Canberra Eclipse |
| 15 | MF | Leah Blayney | 4 July 1986 (aged 18) | | (Australia) NSW Sapphires |
| 16 | MF | Briony Holcombe | 27 February 1986 (aged 18) | | (Australia) NSW Sapphires |
| 17 | MF | Kylie Ledbrook | 20 March 1986 (aged 18) | | (Australia) NSW Sapphires |
| 18 | GK | Yasmin Favretti | 12 December 1985 (aged 18) | | (Australia) NSW Sapphires |
| 19 | FW | Leena Khamis | 19 June 1986 (aged 18) | | (Australia) NSW Sapphires |
| 20 | FW | Alannah Reed | 28 January 1988 (aged 16) | | (Australia) Queensland Sting |
| 21 | GK | Monique Jackson | 20 December 1985 (aged 18) | | (Australia) NSW Sapphires |

=== Canada ===
Head coach: Ian Bridge

| No. | Pos. | Player | Date of birth (age) | Caps | Goals | Club |
|---|---|---|---|---|---|---|
| 1 | GK | Stacey Van Boxmeer | 10 May 1985 (aged 19) | | | (United States Soccer Federation) Indiana Hoosiers |
| 2 | DF | Katie Radchuck | 27 February 1986 (aged 18) | | | (Canadian Soccer Association) Montreal Xtreme |
| 3 | DF | Robyn Gayle | 31 October 1985 (aged 19) | | | (United States Soccer Federation) North Carolina Tar Heels |
| 4 | DF | Tanya Dennis | 26 August 1985 (aged 19) | | | (United States Soccer Federation) Nebraska Cornhuskers |
| 5 | DF | Emily Zurrer | 12 July 1987 (aged 17) | | | (Canadian Soccer Association) Nanaimo Women's Premier |
| 6 | DF | Justine Labrecque | 2 July 1987 (aged 17) | | | (Canadian Soccer Association) Montreal Xtreme |
| 7 | MF | Amanda Cicchini | 28 February 1987 (aged 17) | | | (Canadian Soccer Association) Dixie 86 |
| 8 | MF | Veronique Maranda | 18 August 1986 (aged 18) | | | (Canadian Soccer Association) Montreal Xtreme |
| 9 | FW | Jodi-Ann Robinson | 17 April 1989 (aged 15) | | | (Canadian Soccer Association) Semiahmoo Spirit |
| 10 | MF | Selenia Iacchelli | 5 June 1986 (aged 18) | | | (Canadian Soccer Association) Edmonton Aviators |
| 11 | FW | Josée Bélanger | 14 May 1986 (aged 18) | | | (Canadian Soccer Association) Montreal Xtreme |
| 12 | MF | Kate Bazos | 15 August 1986 (aged 18) | | | (Canadian Soccer Association) Toronto Inferno |
| 13 | FW | Deana Everrett | 26 December 1987 (aged 16) | | | (Canadian Soccer Association) Dixie 86 |
| 14 | FW | Aysha Jamani | 28 June 1987 (aged 17) | | | (Canadian Soccer Association) Edmonton Aviators |
| 15 | DF | Kara Lang (captain) | 22 October 1986 (aged 18) | | | (Canadian Soccer Association) Vancouver Whitecaps |
| 16 | DF | Sophie Schmidt | 28 June 1988 (aged 16) | | | (Canadian Soccer Association) Abbotsford Rush |
| 17 | MF | Brittany Timko | 5 September 1985 (aged 19) | | | (United States Soccer Federation) Nebraska Cornhuskers |
| 18 | FW | Sydney Leroux (Note: Capped for the United States) | 7 May 1990 (aged 14) | | | (Canadian Soccer Association) Coquitlam City Wild |
| 19 | GK | Erin McNulty | 3 June 1989 (aged 15) | | | (Canadian Soccer Association) Bonivital Flames |
| 20 | GK | Stephanie Labbé | 10 October 1986 (aged 18) | | | (Canadian Soccer Association) Edmonton Aviators |
| 21 | DF | Sari Raber | 1 January 1986 (aged 18) | | | (United States Soccer Federation) Nebraska Cornhuskers |

=== Germany ===
Head coach: Silvia Neid

| No. | Pos. | Player | Date of birth (age) | Caps | Goals | Club |
|---|---|---|---|---|---|---|
| 1 | GK | Tessa Rinkes | 14 September 1986 (aged 18) | | | (German Football Association) MTV Mellendorf |
| 2 | DF | Peggy Kuznik | 12 August 1986 (aged 18) | | | (German Football Association) 1. FFC Turbine Potsdam |
| 3 | DF | Anne van Bonn | 12 October 1985 (aged 19) | | | (German Football Association) FCR Duisburg |
| 5 | DF | Annike Krahn | 1 July 1985 (aged 19) | | | (German Football Association) FCR Duisburg |
| 6 | MF | Karolin Thomas | 3 April 1985 (aged 19) | | | (German Football Association) 1. FFC Turbine Potsdam |
| 7 | MF | Melanie Behringer | 18 November 1985 (aged 18) | | | (German Football Association) SC Freiburg |
| 8 | MF | Lena Goeßling | 8 March 1986 (aged 18) | | | (German Football Association) FC Gütersloh |
| 9 | FW | Anja Mittag | 16 May 1985 (aged 19) | | | (German Football Association) 1. FFC Turbine Potsdam |
| 10 | MF | Célia Okoyino da Mbabi | 27 June 1988 (aged 16) | | | (German Football Association) SC 07 Bad Neuenahr |
| 11 | FW | Simone Laudehr | 12 July 1986 (aged 18) | | | (German Football Association) FCR Duisburg |
| 12 | GK | Kathrin Längert | 4 June 1987 (aged 17) | | | (German Football Association) FCR Duisburg |
| 13 | DF | Elena Hauer | 13 February 1986 (aged 18) | | | (German Football Association) FCR Duisburg |
| 14 | DF | Carolin Schiewe | 23 October 1988 (aged 16) | | | (German Football Association) 1. FFC Turbine Potsdam |
| 15 | DF | Stephanie Mpalaskas | 12 February 1986 (aged 18) | | | (German Football Association) FCR Duisburg |
| 16 | MF | Annika Niemeier | 15 April 1987 (aged 17) | | | (German Football Association) TSV Jahn Calden |
| 17 | MF | Angelika Feldbacher | 3 June 1986 (aged 18) | | | (German Football Association) FFC Wacker Munich |
| 18 | DF | Nina Jokuschies | 4 August 1986 (aged 18) | | | (German Football Association) Holstein Kiel |
| 19 | FW | Anna Blässe | 27 February 1987 (aged 17) | | | (German Football Association) FF USV Jena |
| 20 | FW | Patricia Hanebeck | 26 February 1986 (aged 18) | | | (German Football Association) FCR Duisburg |
| 21 | MF | Carolin Veeh | 15 September 1987 (aged 17) | | | (German Football Association) TSV Crailsheim |

=== Thailand ===
Head coach: Prapol Pongpanich

| No. | Pos. | Player | Date of birth (age) | Caps | Goals | Club |
|---|---|---|---|---|---|---|
| 1 | GK | Kanyawee Sudtavee | 11 May 1986 (aged 18) | | | (Football Association of Thailand) Khonkean |
| 2 | DF | Hathairat Thongsri | 12 June 1987 (aged 17) | | | (Football Association of Thailand) Samutprakarn |
| 3 | DF | Anootsara Maijarern | 14 February 1986 (aged 18) | | | (Football Association of Thailand) Khonkean |
| 4 | DF | Thidarat Wiwasukhu | 18 February 1985 (aged 19) | | | (Football Association of Thailand) Srisaket |
| 5 | DF | Supaporn Gaewbaen (captain) | 4 March 1985 (aged 19) | | | (Football Association of Thailand) Bangkok |
| 6 | MF | Suchada Jitmaneerote | 31 July 1985 (aged 19) | | | (Football Association of Thailand) Suphanburi Sports School |
| 7 | MF | Niparat Sriwasao | 15 March 1985 (aged 19) | | | (Football Association of Thailand) Suphanburi Sports School |
| 8 | MF | Naphat Seesraum | 11 May 1987 (aged 17) | | | (Football Association of Thailand) Khonkean |
| 9 | MF | Pavinee Netthip | 1 February 1987 (aged 17) | | | (Football Association of Thailand) Samchuke |
| 10 | FW | Kitiya Thiangtham | 30 June 1986 (aged 18) | | | (Football Association of Thailand) Banhan |
| 11 | DF | Nantawan Khayansakarn | 12 October 1986 (aged 18) | | | (Football Association of Thailand) Samchuke |
| 12 | FW | Duangnapa Sritala | 4 February 1986 (aged 18) | | | (Football Association of Thailand) Sport College |
| 13 | FW | Orathai Srimanee | 12 June 1988 (aged 16) | | | (Football Association of Thailand) Khonkean |
| 14 | DF | Jiraprapa Tupsuri | 30 June 1988 (aged 16) | | | (Football Association of Thailand) Khonkean |
| 15 | MF | Saranya Kaewka | 9 August 1986 (aged 18) | | | (Football Association of Thailand) Khonkean |
| 16 | DF | Pikul Khueanpet | 20 September 1988 (aged 16) | | | (Football Association of Thailand) Khonkean |
| 17 | DF | Siriporn Mungkhala | 22 January 1986 (aged 18) | | | (Football Association of Thailand) Khonkean |
| 18 | GK | Benjawan Changauttha | 21 November 1986 (aged 17) | | | (Football Association of Thailand) Bangkok |
| 19 | FW | Pattarawan Thongkern | 16 April 1986 (aged 18) | | | (Football Association of Thailand) Khonkean |
| 20 | GK | Kwannapa Oonsap | 8 May 1987 (aged 17) | | | (Football Association of Thailand) Samchuke |
| 21 | MF | Suponthip Wiphakonwit | 20 September 1988 (aged 16) | | | (Football Association of Thailand) Banhan |

== Group B ==
=== Brazil ===
Head coach: Luiz Ferreira

| No. | Pos. | Player | Date of birth (age) | Caps | Goals | Club |
|---|---|---|---|---|---|---|
| 1 | GK | Kelly Nunes | 23 February 1986 (aged 18) | | | (Brazilian Football Confederation) Marilia |
| 2 | DF | Tatiana | 18 March 1985 (aged 19) | | | (Brazilian Football Confederation) Comercial |
| 3 | DF | Elysa | 21 June 1987 (aged 17) | | | (Brazilian Football Confederation) Uni Santanna |
| 4 | DF | Renata Diniz (captain) | 1 November 1985 (aged 19) | | | (Brazilian Football Confederation) Santos |
| 5 | DF | Aliane | 30 December 1986 (aged 17) | | | (Brazilian Football Confederation) Sao Bernardo |
| 6 | DF | Karen | 17 February 1985 (aged 19) | | | (Brazilian Football Confederation) Santos |
| 7 | FW | Kelly | 8 May 1985 (aged 19) | | | (Brazilian Football Confederation) CEPE-Caxias |
| 8 | MF | Renata Costa | 8 July 1986 (aged 18) | | | (Brazilian Football Confederation) Santos |
| 9 | MF | Rosana | 27 July 1987 (aged 17) | | | (Brazilian Football Confederation) Juventus |
| 10 | FW | Marta | 19 February 1986 (aged 18) | | | (Swedish Football Association) Umeå |
| 11 | FW | Cristiane | 15 May 1985 (aged 19) | | | (Brazilian Football Confederation) Sao Bernardo |
| 12 | GK | Thaís | 19 June 1987 (aged 17) | | | (Brazilian Football Confederation) Uni Santanna |
| 13 | DF | Raquel Bueno | 8 January 1985 (aged 19) | | | (Brazilian Football Confederation) Sao Caetano |
| 14 | DF | Francine | 28 May 1986 (aged 18) | | | (Brazilian Football Confederation) Botucatu |
| 15 | MF | Adriana | 9 April 1985 (aged 19) | | | (Brazilian Football Confederation) Uni Santanna |
| 16 | FW | Dayane | 13 May 1985 (aged 19) | | | (Brazilian Football Confederation) Novo Mundo |
| 17 | MF | Maurine | 14 January 1986 (aged 18) | | | (Brazilian Football Confederation) Grêmio |
| 18 | FW | Érika | 4 February 1988 (aged 16) | | | (Brazilian Football Confederation) Juventus |
| 19 | FW | Sandra | 26 June 1985 (aged 19) | | | (Brazilian Football Confederation) Sao Bernardo |
| 20 | FW | Raquel | 9 July 1985 (aged 19) | | | (Brazilian Football Confederation) CEPE-Caxias |
| 21 | GK | Rita | 24 June 1987 (aged 17) | | | (Brazilian Football Confederation) Gresfi |

=== China PR ===
Head coach: Haiming Wang

| No. | Pos. | Player | Date of birth (age) | Caps | Goals | Club |
|---|---|---|---|---|---|---|
| 1 | GK | Zhang Yanru | 10 January 1987 (aged 17) | | | (Chinese Football Association) Jiangsu Shuntian |
| 2 | DF | Gao Yan | 13 October 1985 (aged 19) | | | (Chinese Football Association) Shanghai SVA |
| 3 | DF | Guo Lin | 11 October 1985 (aged 19) | | | (Chinese Football Association) Beijing Chengjian |
| 4 | DF | Wang Kun | 20 October 1985 (aged 19) | | | (Chinese Football Association) Hebei |
| 5 | DF | Sun Yongxia (captain) | 19 March 1985 (aged 19) | | | (Chinese Football Association) Tianjin Teda |
| 6 | MF | Hou Lijia | 3 October 1986 (aged 18) | | | (Chinese Football Association) Dalian |
| 7 | MF | Sun Ling | 12 November 1985 (aged 18) | | | (Chinese Football Association) Shanghai SVA |
| 8 | MF | Zhang Ying | 27 June 1985 (aged 19) | | | (Chinese Football Association) Shanghai SVA |
| 9 | FW | Xu Yuan | 17 November 1985 (aged 18) | | | (Chinese Football Association) Lanzhou |
| 10 | MF | Wang Dandan | 1 May 1985 (aged 19) | | | (Chinese Football Association) Beijing Chengjian |
| 11 | FW | Lui Sa | 11 July 1987 (aged 17) | | | (Chinese Football Association) Beijing Chengjian |
| 12 | DF | Guo Yue | 12 December 1985 (aged 18) | | | (Chinese Football Association) Changchun |
| 13 | FW | Ma Xiaoxu | 5 June 1988 (aged 16) | | | (Chinese Football Association) Dalian |
| 14 | MF | Lou Xiaoxu | 30 May 1986 (aged 18) | | | (Chinese Football Association) Changchun |
| 15 | MF | Wang Cong | 19 April 1985 (aged 19) | | | (Chinese Football Association) Army Club |
| 16 | DF | Weng Xinzhi | 15 June 1988 (aged 16) | | | (Chinese Football Association) Jiangsu Shuntian |
| 17 | MF | Gao Ying | 1 July 1985 (aged 19) | | | (Chinese Football Association) Beijing Chengjian |
| 18 | GK | Weng Xiaojie | 27 July 1987 (aged 17) | | | (Chinese Football Association) Jiangsu Shuntian |
| 19 | DF | Ge Yang | 12 May 1985 (aged 19) | | | (Chinese Football Association) Jiangsu Shuntian |
| 20 | MF | Sun Lisha | 1 September 1985 (aged 19) | | | (Chinese Football Association) Lanzhou |
| 21 | GK | Song Jianqiu | 12 December 1986 (aged 17) | | | (Chinese Football Association) Army Club |

=== Nigeria ===
Head coach: Felix Ibe Ukwu

| No. | Pos. | Player | Date of birth (age) | Caps | Goals | Club |
|---|---|---|---|---|---|---|
| 1 | GK | Rose Okwara | 3 December 1987 (aged 16) | | | (Nigeria Football Federation) Pelican Stars |
| 2 | MF | Rita Chikwelu | 6 March 1988 (aged 16) | | | (Nigeria Football Federation) FCT Queens |
| 3 | MF | Akudo Sabi | 17 November 1986 (aged 17) | | | (Nigeria Football Federation) Bayelsa Queens |
| 4 | FW | Cynthia Uwak | 15 July 1986 (aged 18) | | | (Nigeria Football Federation) FCT Queens |
| 5 | DF | Chima Nwosu | 12 March 1986 (aged 18) | | | (Nigeria Football Federation) Inneh Queens |
| 6 | DF | Lilian Cole | 1 August 1985 (aged 19) | | | (Nigeria Football Federation) Delta Queens |
| 7 | FW | Semola Akinlose | 1 September 1985 (aged 19) | | | (Nigeria Football Federation) Delta Queens |
| 8 | MF | Ayisat Yusuf | 6 March 1985 (aged 19) | | | (Nigeria Football Federation) Delta Queens |
| 9 | FW | Akudo Iwuagwu | 13 October 1986 (aged 18) | | | (Nigeria Football Federation) Delta Queens |
| 10 | MF | Evelyn Nwabuoku | 14 November 1985 (aged 18) | | | (Nigeria Football Federation) Bayelsa Queens |
| 11 | DF | Adeola Aminu | 6 August 1986 (aged 18) | | | (Nigeria Football Federation) Delta Queens |
| 12 | FW | Stella Godwin | 12 April 1986 (aged 18) | | | (Danish Football Association) Odense |
| 13 | FW | Promise Sike | 15 January 1987 (aged 17) | | | (Nigeria Football Federation) Delta Queens |
| 14 | DF | Augusta Egwim | 30 March 1985 (aged 19) | | | (Nigeria Football Federation) Rivers Angels |
| 15 | FW | Rosemary Okesie | 30 November 1986 (aged 17) | | | (Nigeria Football Federation) Bayelsa Queens |
| 16 | DF | Faith Ikidi | 28 February 1987 (aged 17) | | | (Nigeria Football Federation) Bayelsa Queens |
| 17 | DF | Blessing Akusobi | 17 August 1986 (aged 18) | | | (Nigeria Football Federation) Macbeth FC |
| 18 | GK | Ogechi Onyinanya | 26 May 1985 (aged 19) | | | (Nigeria Football Federation) Pelican Stars |
| 19 | DF | Ulunma Jerome | 11 April 1988 (aged 16) | | | (Nigeria Football Federation) Delta Queens |
| 20 | FW | Nkese Udoh (captain) | 10 September 1986 (aged 18) | | | (United States Soccer Federation) Lindsey Wilson College |
| 21 | FW | Olamide Alake | 25 December 1987 (aged 16) | | | (Nigeria Football Federation) Bayelsa Queens |

=== Italy ===
Head coach: Elisabetta Bavagnoli

| No. | Pos. | Player | Date of birth (age) | Caps | Goals | Club |
|---|---|---|---|---|---|---|
| 1 | GK | Chiara Marchitelli (captain) | 4 May 1985 (aged 19) | | | (Italian Football Federation) Atletico Oristano |
| 2 | MF | Penelope Riboldi | 2 July 1986 (aged 18) | | | (Italian Football Federation) Atalanta Femminile |
| 3 | DF | Fabiana Costi | 6 October 1986 (aged 18) | | | (Italian Football Federation) Reggiana |
| 4 | MF | Diana Bellucci | 11 March 1983 (aged 21) | | | (Italian Football Federation) Monti del Matese |
| 5 | DF | Valeria Magrini | 18 February 1985 (aged 19) | | | (Italian Football Federation) Vigor Senigallia |
| 6 | MF | Anna Bincoletto | 6 March 1985 (aged 19) | | | (Italian Football Federation) Piossasco |
| 7 | MF | Veronica Brutti | 1 September 1987 (aged 17) | | | (Italian Football Federation) Porto Mantovano |
| 8 | MF | Marta Carissimi | 3 May 1987 (aged 17) | | | (Italian Football Federation) Torino |
| 9 | FW | Agnese Ricco | 20 April 1986 (aged 18) | | | (Swiss Football Association) Rapid Lugano |
| 10 | FW | Serena Coppolino | 26 April 1985 (aged 19) | | | (Italian Football Federation) Matuziana San Remo |
| 11 | MF | Silvia Casali | 29 January 1985 (aged 19) | | | (Italian Football Federation) ACF Milan |
| 12 | GK | Paola Bianchi | 29 August 1986 (aged 18) | | | (Italian Football Federation) Bardolino |
| 13 | DF | Sonia Quitadamo | 10 October 1985 (aged 19) | | | (Italian Football Federation) ACF Milan |
| 14 | GK | Giorgia Braiato | 4 October 1987 (aged 17) | | | (Italian Football Federation) Porto Mantovano |
| 15 | DF | Alia Guagni | 1 October 1987 (aged 17) | | | (Italian Football Federation) Firenze |
| 16 | FW | Daniela Sabatino | 26 June 1985 (aged 19) | | | (Italian Football Federation) Monti del Matese |
| 17 | DF | Arianna Marchesi | 1 November 1986 (aged 18) | | | (Italian Football Federation) Perugia |
| 18 | MF | Cristina Miani | 15 September 1985 (aged 19) | | | (Italian Football Federation) Rivignano |
| 19 | MF | Serena Patu | 24 February 1985 (aged 19) | | | (Italian Football Federation) Firenze |
| 20 | FW | Evelyn Vicchiarello | 24 October 1986 (aged 18) | | | (Italian Football Federation) Roseto |
| 21 | DF | Raffaella Manieri | 21 November 1986 (aged 17) | | | (Italian Football Federation) Vigor Senigallia |

== Group C ==
=== South Korea ===
The South Korea squad consisted of 21 players.
Coach: Baek Jong-chul

| No. | Pos. | Player | Date of birth (age) | Caps | Club |
|---|---|---|---|---|---|
| 1 | GK | Jun Min-kyung | 16 January 1985 (aged 19) | | (South Korea) Ulsan College |
| 2 | GK | We Sung-hee | 10 October 1986 (aged 18) | | (South Korea) Hyundai Chungun High School |
| 3 | DF | Lee Jin-hwa | 10 October 1986 (aged 18) | | (South Korea) Yesung Girls' High School |
| 4 | DF | Lee Ye-eun | 2 February 1988 (aged 16) | | (South Korea) Gangil Girls' High School |
| 5 | DF | Yoon Young-geul | 28 October 1987 (aged 17) | | (South Korea) Osan Information High School |
| 6 | DF | Park Mi-jung (captain) | 12 January 1985 (aged 19) | | (South Korea) Yeungjin College |
| 7 | MF | Kim Joo-hee | 10 March 1985 (aged 19) | | (South Korea) Hanyang Women's University |
| 8 | MF | Lee Jang-mi | 14 November 1985 (aged 18) | | (South Korea) Yeungjin College |
| 9 | DF | Park Eun-sun | 25 December 1986 (aged 17) | | (South Korea) Wirye Information Industry High School |
| 10 | FW | Park Hee-young | 11 June 1985 (aged 19) | | (South Korea) Yeungjin College |
| 11 | FW | Park Eun-jung | 4 November 1986 (aged 18) | | (South Korea) Yesung Girls' High School |
| 12 | DF | Moon Seul-a | 15 December 1986 (aged 17) | | (South Korea) Osan Information High School |
| 13 | FW | Jung Sey-hwa | 19 March 1986 (aged 18) | | (South Korea) Chungnam Internet High School |
| 14 | MF | Ryu Ha-yun | 12 June 1986 (aged 18) | | (South Korea) Janghowon High School |
| 15 | MF | Jung Mi-jung | 30 August 1986 (aged 18) | | (South Korea) Hanil Computer Science Girls' High School |
| 16 | MF | Song Yu-na | 1 April 1987 (aged 17) | | (South Korea) Dongsin High School |
| 17 | FW | Han Song-i | 28 July 1985 (aged 19) | | (South Korea) Yeoju Institute of Technology |
| 18 | MF | Pang A-lang | 11 November 1986 (aged 17) | | (South Korea) Janghowon High School |
| 19 | DF | Cha Yun-hee | 26 February 1986 (aged 18) | | (South Korea) Yeoju Institute of Technology |
| 20 | DF | Jeon Jae-min | 7 September 1985 (aged 19) | | (South Korea) Yeoju Institute of Technology |
| 21 | GK | Kim Ju-ok | 12 January 1987 (aged 17) | | (South Korea) Aloysius Technical High School |

=== Russia ===
Head coach: Valentin Grishin

| No. | Pos. | Player | Date of birth (age) | Caps | Goals | Club |
|---|---|---|---|---|---|---|
| 1 | GK | Elvira Todua | 31 January 1986 (aged 18) | | | (Russian Football Union) Rossiyanka |
| 2 | DF | Elena Sedova | 11 August 1986 (aged 18) | | | (Russian Football Union) Victoria Belgorod |
| 3 | DF | Anastasia Kostyukova | 15 May 1985 (aged 19) | | | (Russian Football Union) CSK VVS Samara |
| 4 | DF | Alexandra Gomozova | 8 August 1986 (aged 18) | | | (Russian Football Union) Chertanovo Moscow |
| 5 | DF | Elena Semenchenko (captain) | 23 January 1985 (aged 19) | | | (Russian Football Union) Chertanovo Moscow |
| 6 | MF | Oxana Titova | 17 July 1986 (aged 18) | | | (Russian Football Union) Nadezhda Noginsk |
| 7 | MF | Ekaterina Sochneva | 12 August 1985 (aged 19) | | | (Russian Football Union) Chertanovo Moscow |
| 8 | MF | Elena Terekhova | 5 July 1987 (aged 17) | | | (Russian Football Union) Voronezh |
| 9 | MF | Svetlana Tsidikova | 4 February 1985 (aged 19) | | | (Russian Football Union) Rossiyanka |
| 10 | MF | Yana Fomina | 3 November 1986 (aged 18) | | | (Russian Football Union) CSK VVS Samara |
| 11 | MF | Elena Morozova | 15 March 1987 (aged 17) | | | (Russian Football Union) Rossiyanka |
| 12 | GK | Svetlana Baikina | 25 January 1985 (aged 19) | | | (Russian Football Union) Lada Togliatti |
| 13 | DF | Ksenia Tsybutovich | 26 June 1987 (aged 17) | | | (Russian Football Union) Chertanovo Moscow |
| 14 | FW | Olga Petrova | 9 July 1986 (aged 18) | | | (Russian Football Union) Rossiyanka |
| 15 | MF | Olga Peshina | 15 September 1987 (aged 17) | | | (Russian Football Union) CSK VVS Samara |
| 16 | MF | Nadezda Kharchenko | 27 March 1987 (aged 17) | | | (Russian Football Union) CSK VVS Samara |
| 17 | DF | Liubov Bukashkina | 11 June 1987 (aged 17) | | | (Russian Football Union) Voronezh |
| 18 | MF | Galina Makarova | 10 September 1986 (aged 18) | | | (Russian Football Union) Victoria Belgorod |
| 19 | FW | Elena Gorbacheva | 5 June 1987 (aged 17) | | | (Russian Football Union) Voronezh |
| 20 | FW | Anna Goryacheva | 23 February 1986 (aged 18) | | | (Russian Football Union) CSK VVS Samara |
| 21 | GK | Nadezhda Mezhakova | 1 December 1987 (aged 16) | | | (Russian Football Union) Victoria Belgorod |

=== Spain ===
The Spain squad consisted of 21 players.
Coach: Ignacio Quereda

| No. | Pos. | Player | Date of birth (age) | Caps | Club |
|---|---|---|---|---|---|
| 1 | GK | Lucía Muñoz | 8 December 1985 (aged 18) | | (Spain) CE Sabadell |
| 2 | DF | Irantzu Castrillo | 9 July 1985 (aged 19) | | (Spain) Athletic Bilbao |
| 3 | FW | Verónica Boquete | 9 April 1987 (aged 17) | | (Spain) SD Xuventú Aguiño |
| 4 | MF | Míriam Diéguez | 4 May 1986 (aged 18) | | (Spain) RCD Espanyol |
| 5 | DF | Ruth García | 26 March 1987 (aged 17) | | (Spain) Levante UD |
| 6 | MF | Aintzane Encinas | 22 April 1988 (aged 16) | | (Spain) Real Sociedad |
| 7 | FW | Natalia Pablos | 15 October 1985 (aged 19) | | (Spain) Rayo Vallecano |
| 8 | MF | Nuria Zufía | 4 April 1985 (aged 19) | | (Spain) SD Lagunak |
| 9 | FW | Jade Boho (Note: Capped for Equatorial Guinea) | 30 August 1985 (aged 19) | | (Spain) AD Torrejón CF |
| 10 | MF | Iraia Iturregi (captain) | 24 April 1985 (aged 19) | | (Spain) Athletic Bilbao |
| 11 | MF | Ana Romero "Willy" | 14 June 1987 (aged 17) | | (Spain) CD Híspalis |
| 12 | FW | Irune Murua | 23 April 1986 (aged 18) | | (Spain) Athletic Bilbao |
| 13 | GK | "Mariatxi" Sánchez | 14 May 1986 (aged 18) | | (Spain) CD Amaya |
| 14 | DF | Silvia Doblado | 22 March 1987 (aged 17) | | (Spain) CD Rayco |
| 15 | DF | Ane Bergara | 3 February 1987 (aged 17) | | (Spain) SD Lagunak |
| 16 | MF | Carme Ferrer | 10 November 1985 (aged 19) | | (Spain) Levante UD |
| 17 | MF | Júlia de la Paz Vera | 9 July 1987 (aged 17) | | (Spain) Sporting Plaza de Argel |
| 18 | DF | Zuriñe Gil | 20 February 1987 (aged 17) | | (Spain) Athletic Bilbao |
| 19 | FW | Judith Acedo | 26 January 1986 (aged 18) | | (Spain) FC Barcelona |
| 20 | MF | Irene Sampietro | 3 November 1986 (aged 18) | | (Spain) CD Transportes Alcaine |
| 21 | GK | María Rodríguez | 10 May 1987 (aged 17) | | (Spain) Oviedo Moderno CF |

=== United States ===
The USA squad consisted of 21 players.

Head coach: Mark Krikorian

| No. | Pos. | Player | Date of birth (age) | Caps | Goals | Club |
|---|---|---|---|---|---|---|
| 1 | GK | Kelsey Davis | 14 May 1987 (aged 17) | | | (United States Soccer Federation) UCLA Bruins |
| 2 | MF | Stephanie Kron | 20 August 1985 (aged 19) | | | (United States Soccer Federation) UCLA Bruins |
| 3 | DF | Rachel Buehler | 26 August 1985 (aged 19) | | | (United States Soccer Federation) Stanford Cardinal |
| 4 | MF | Jennifer Redmond | 19 April 1986 (aged 18) | | | (United States Soccer Federation) Virginia Cavaliers |
| 5 | MF | Sheree Gray | 12 December 1985 (aged 18) | | | (United States Soccer Federation) Penn State Nittany Lions |
| 6 | DF | Stephanie Lopez | 3 April 1986 (aged 18) | | | (United States Soccer Federation) Portland Pilots |
| 7 | FW | Megan Rapinoe | 5 July 1985 (aged 19) | | | (United States Soccer Federation) Portland Pilots |
| 8 | MF | Stephanie Logterman | 25 February 1986 (aged 18) | | | (United States Soccer Federation) Texas Longhorns |
| 9 | FW | Kerri Hanks | 2 September 1985 (aged 19) | | | (United States Soccer Federation) Notre Dame Fighting Irish |
| 10 | MF | Angie Woznuk | 29 March 1985 (aged 19) | | | (United States Soccer Federation) Portland Pilots |
| 11 | DF | Becky Sauerbrunn | 6 June 1985 (aged 19) | | | (United States Soccer Federation) Virginia Cavaliers |
| 12 | MF | Alexa Orand | 10 October 1987 (aged 17) | | | (United States Soccer Federation) Santa Clara Broncos |
| 13 | MF | Yael Averbuch | 3 November 1986 (aged 18) | | | (United States Soccer Federation) North Carolina Tar Heels |
| 14 | MF | Meghan Schnur | 16 April 1985 (aged 19) | | | (United States Soccer Federation) Connecticut Huskies |
| 15 | DF | Nikki Krzysik (Note: Capped for Poland) | 23 May 1987 (aged 17) | | | (United States Soccer Federation) Virginia Cavaliers |
| 16 | FW | Amy Rodriguez | 17 February 1987 (aged 17) | | | (United States Soccer Federation) USC Trojans |
| 17 | FW | Jessica Rostedt | 3 March 1986 (aged 18) | | | (United States Soccer Federation) Virginia Cavaliers |
| 18 | GK | Ashlyn Harris (captain) | 19 October 1985 (aged 19) | | | (United States Soccer Federation) North Carolina Tar Heels |
| 19 | DF | Meagan Holmes | 21 February 1987 (aged 17) | | | (United States Soccer Federation) USC Trojans |
| 20 | MF | Stacy Lindstrom | 23 February 1985 (aged 19) | | | (United States Soccer Federation) UCLA Bruins |
| 21 | GK | Laura Comeau | 13 December 1985 (aged 18) | | | (United States Soccer Federation) Virginia Cavaliers |
