= 2004 FIFA U-19 Women's World Championship =

FIFA U-19 Women's World Championship Thailand 2004 ฟุตบอลหญิงชิงแชมป์โลก รุ่นอายุไม่เกิน 19 ปี

Tournament details
- Host country: Thailand
- Dates: 10–27 November
- Teams: 12 (from 5 confederations)
- Venues: 4 (in 3 host cities)

Final positions
- Champions: Germany (1st title)
- Runners-up: China
- Third place: United States
- Fourth place: Brazil

Tournament statistics
- Matches played: 26
- Goals scored: 92 (3.54 per match)
- Attendance: 288,324 (11,089 per match)
- Top scorer(s): (Canada) Brittany Timko (7 goals)
- Best player: (Brazil) Marta
- Fair play award: United States

The 2004 FIFA U-19 Women's World Championship was held from 10 to 27 November 2004. It was the second edition of the youth tournament for women put together by FIFA, before being renamed FIFA U-20 Women's World Championship for the 2006 edition. The tournament was hosted by Thailand, in two stadiums in Bangkok, one in Chiang Mai and another in Phuket. This was the first FIFA women's tournament held in Southeast Asia.

Brazil's Marta was the Adidas Golden Ball recipient, as the tournament's most valuable player (MVP), and Canada's Brittany Timko won the Golden Shoe with 7 goals in 4 games.

== Venues ==
Bangkok		Chiang Mai	Phuket
Rajamangala National Stadium	Suphachalasai Stadium	700th Anniversary Stadium	Surakul Stadium
Capacity: 65,000	Capacity: 35,000	Capacity: 25,000	Capacity: 15,000
2004 FIFA U-19 Women's World Championship is located in Thailand

== Qualified teams ==
The places have been allocated as follows to confederations: CAF (1), AFC (2), UEFA (4), CONCACAF (2), CONMEBOL (1), OFC (1), plus the host country (1).

Confederation (Continent)	Qualifying Tournament	Qualifier(s)
AFC (Asia)	Host nation	Thailand^{1}
AFC (Asia)	2004 AFC U-19 Women's Championship	South Korea^{1} China^{1}
CAF (Africa)	2004 African U-19 Women's Championship	Nigeria
CONCACAF (North, Central America & Caribbean)	2004 CONCACAF U-19 Women's Qualifying Tournament	Canada; United States
CONMEBOL (South America)	2004 South American Under-19 Women's Football Championship	Brazil
OFC (Oceania)	2004 OFC Women's Under 19 Qualifying Tournament	Australia
UEFA (Europe)	2004 UEFA Women's Under-19 Championship	Spain^{1} Germany; Italy^{1} Russia^{1}

1.Teams that made their debut.

== Group stage ==
All times local (UTC+7)

=== Group A ===
Team	Pts	Pld	W	D	L	GF	GA	GD
Germany	7	3	2	1	0	13	3	+10
Canada	7	3	2	1	0	12	4	+8
Australia	3	3	1	0	2	6	6	0
Thailand	0	3	0	0	3	0	18	−18

2004-11-10
17:00

Thailand	0–6	Germany
	(Report)	10' Mittag; 12', 41' Goeßling; 17', 24' Okoyino Da Mbabi; 43' Laudehr

Rajamangala National Stadium, Bangkok
Attendance: 40,000
Referee: (Colombia) Martha Toro

2004-11-10
19:45

Australia	1–2	Canada
McCallum 49'	(Report)	14', 19' Timko

Rajamangala National Stadium, Bangkok
Attendance: 40,000
Referee: (England) Alexandra Ihringova

2004-11-13
17:00

Germany	4–0	Australia
Okoyino Da Mbabi 4'; Mittag 26', 73'; Blässe 85'	(Report)

Suphachalasai Stadium, Bangkok
Attendance: 5,000
Referee: (El Salvador) María Ortega

2004-11-13
19:45

Canada	7–0	Thailand
Dennis 11'; Timko 25', 35', 56'; Robinson 33'; Maranda 46'; Jamani 54'	(Report)

Suphachalasai Stadium, Bangkok
Attendance: 5,500
Referee: (Italy) Anna De Toni

2004-11-16
19:45

Germany	3–3	Canada
Hanebeck 4'; Mittag 10', 37'	(Report)	40' Lang; 42' Maranda; 63' Timko

Suphachalasai Stadium, Bangkok
Attendance: 2,500
Referee: (France) Sarah Girard

2004-11-16
19:45

Australia	5–0	Thailand
McCallum 10', 19'; Wiwasukhu 26' (o.g.); Ledbrook 45'; Kuralay 55'	(Report)

700th Anniversary Stadium, Chiang Mai
Attendance: 21,600
Referee: (Japan) Mayumi Oiwa

=== Group B ===
Team	Pts	Pld	W	D	L	GF	GA	GD
Brazil	6	3	2	0	1	6	5	+1
China	6	3	2	0	1	4	3	+1
Nigeria	4	3	1	1	1	4	4	0
Italy	1	3	0	1	2	3	5	−2

2004-11-10
17:00

Nigeria	0–1	China
	(Report)	77' Zhang

700th Anniversary Stadium, Chiang Mai
Attendance: 6,000
Referee: (France) Sarah Girard

2004-11-10
19:45

Italy	1–2	Brazil
Ricco 64'	(Report)	11' (o.g.) Costi; 84' Kelly

700th Anniversary Stadium, Chiang Mai
Attendance: 6,000
Referee: (South Korea) Hong Eun-Ah

2004-11-13
17:00

China	2–1	Italy
Wang 52'; Xu 82'	(Report)	24' Ricco

700th Anniversary Stadium, Chiang Mai
Attendance: 6,000
Referee: (Australia) Jacqui Melksham

2004-11-13
19:45

Brazil	2–3	Nigeria
Marta 55'; Cristiane 83'	(Report)	9' Uwak; 14' Godwin; 90' Sabi

700th Anniversary Stadium, Chiang Mai
Attendance: 7,687
Referee: (Mexico) Virginia Tovar

2004-11-16
17:00

China	1–2	Brazil
Lou 53'	(Report)	38' Marta; 47' Cristiane

Suphachalasai Stadium, Bangkok
Attendance: 2,500
Referee: (England) Alexandra Ihringova

2004-11-16
17:00

Italy	1–1	Nigeria
Manieri 68'	(Report)	88' Sabi

700th Anniversary Stadium, Chiang Mai
Attendance: 5,400
Referee: (Colombia) Martha Toro

=== Group C ===
Team	Pts	Pld	W	D	L	GF	GA	GD
United States	9	3	3	0	0	8	1	+7
Russia	3	3	1	0	2	5	7	−2
South Korea	3	3	1	0	2	3	5	−2
Spain	3	3	1	0	2	3	6	−3

2004-11-10
17:00

South Korea	0–3	United States
	(Report)	15' (pen.)Woznuk; 17' Rodriguez; 72' Gray

Surakul Stadium, Phuket
Attendance: 9,900
Referee: (Greece) Antonia Kokotou

2004-11-10
19:45

Russia	4–1	Spain
Terekhova 10'; Sochneva 36'; Petrova 76'; Gil 88' (o.g.)	(Report)	24' Zufía

Surakul Stadium, Phuket
Attendance: 5,000
Referee: (Thailand) Pannipar Kamnueng

2004-11-14
17:00

United States	4–1	Russia
Woznuk 2' (pen.); Rostedt 25', 60'; Rapinoe 63'	(Report)	46' Sochneva

Surakul Stadium, Phuket
Attendance: 8,563
Referee: (Japan) Mayumi Oiwa

2004-11-14
19:45

Spain	2–1	South Korea
Boho 19', 57'	(Report)	72' Park E.

Surakul Stadium, Phuket
Attendance: 13,563
Referee: (South Africa) Deidre Mitchell

2004-11-18
17:00

United States	1–0	Spain
Rostedt 44'	(Report)

Surakul Stadium, Phuket
Attendance: 9,652
Referee: (Mexico) Virginia Tovar

2004-11-18
17:00

Russia	0–2	South Korea
	(Report)	21' Lee; 55' Park H.

Suphachalasai Stadium, Bangkok
Attendance: 800
Referee: (Australia) Jacqui Melksham

== Knockout Round ==
All times local (UTC+7)

=== Knockout Map ===
Quarter-finals
21 November - Chiang Mai
Germany (pso)	1 (5)
Nigeria	1 (4)
21 November - Chiang Mai
United States	2
Australia	0
21 November - Bangkok
Brazil (a.e.t)	4
Russia	2
21 November - Bangkok
Canada	1
China	3

Semi-finals
24 November - Bangkok
Germany	3
United States	1
24 November - Bangkok
Brazil	0
China	2

Final
27 November - Bangkok
Germany	2
China	0
Third place
27 November - Bangkok
United States	3
Brazil	0

=== Quarterfinals ===
21 November
17:00

Germany	1–1 (aet)	Nigeria
Mittag 86'	(Report)	35' Udoh
Penalties
Hanebeck (penalty scored); Hauer (penalty scored); Thomas (penalty scored); Mittag (penalty scored); Behringer (penalty scored)	5–4	(penalty missed) Iwuagwu; (penalty scored) Sike; (penalty scored) Udoh; (penalty scored) Godwin; (penalty scored) Yusuf

700th Anniversary Stadium, Chiang Mai
Attendance: 6,579
Referee: (El Salvador) María Ortega

21 November
17:00

Brazil	4–2 (aet)	Russia
Marta 42'; Cristiane 90+4'; Sandra 114', 117'	(Report)	29' Tsybutovich; 61' Tsidikova

Suphachalasai Stadium, Bangkok
Attendance: 5,400
Referee: (Thailand) Pannipar Kamnueng

21 November
19:45

United States	2–0	Australia
Rodriguez 54'; Rapinoe 68'	(Report)

700th Anniversary Stadium, Chiang Mai
Attendance: 8,280
Referee: (Japan) Mayumi Oiwa

21 November
19:45

Canada	1–3	China
Timko 63'	(Report)	3' (pen.), 21' Zhang; 65' Liu

Suphachalasai Stadium, Bangkok
Attendance: 5,400
Referee: (Italy) Anna De Toni

=== Semifinals ===
24 November
17:00

Germany	3–1	United States
Krahn 11'; Behringer 69'; Hanebeck 82'	(Report)	16' (o.g.) Krahn

Suphachalasai Stadium, Bangkok
Attendance: 10,500
Referee: (Italy) Anna De Toni

24 November
19:45

Brazil	0–2	China
	(Report)	11', 42' Lou

Suphachalasai Stadium, Bangkok
Attendance: 10,500
Referee: (England) Alexandra Ihringova

=== Third place play-off ===
27 November
16:00

United States	3–0	Brazil
Hanks 21'; Rapinoe 27'; Woznuk 73'	(Report)

Rajamangala National Stadium, Bangkok
Attendance: 23,000
Referee: (France) Sarah Girard

=== Final ===
27 November
19:00

Germany	2–0	China
Laudehr 4'; Behringer 83'	(Report)

Rajamangala National Stadium, Bangkok
Attendance: 23,000
Referee: (Mexico) Virginia Tovar

2004 FIFA U-19 Women's World Championship winners

Germany
First title

== Awards ==
The following awards were given for the tournament:

Golden Ball	Silver Ball	Bronze Ball
(Brazil) Marta	(United States) Angie Woznuk	(Germany) Anja Mittag
Golden Shoe	Silver Shoe	Bronze Shoe
(Canada) Brittany Baxter	(Germany) Anja Mittag	(United States) Angie Woznuk
7 goals	6 goals	3 goals
FIFA Fair Play Award
United States

=== All star team ===
Goalkeepers	Defenders	Midfielders	Forwards
(Russia) Elvira Todua (United States) Ashlyn Harris	(China) Wang Kun (Nigeria) Akudo Sabi (Russia) Elena Semenchenko (Thailand) Supaphon Kaeobaen (United States) Becky Sauerbrunn	(China) Zhang Ying (Brazil) Marta (Germany) Simone Laudehr (Germany) Patricia Hanebeck (South Korea) Lee Jang-mi (Russia) Svetlana Tsidikova (United States) Angie Woznuk	(Brazil) Cristiane (Canada) Brittany Timko (Spain) Veronica Boquete (Germany) Anja Mittag

== Goalscorers ==
7 goals

- (Canada) Brittany Timko

6 goals

- (Germany) Anja Mittag

3 goals

- (Australia) Collette McCallum
- (Brazil) Cristiane
- (Brazil) Marta
- (China) Lou Xiaoxu
- (China) Zhang Ying
- (Germany) Celia Okoyino Da Mbabi
- (United States) Megan Rapinoe
- (United States) Jessica Rostedt
- (United States) Angie Woznuk

2 goals

- (Brazil) Sandra
- (Canada) Veronique Maranda
- (Germany) Melanie Behringer
- (Germany) Lena Goeßling
- (Germany) Patricia Hanebeck
- (Germany) Simone Laudehr
- (Italy) Agnese Ricco
- (Nigeria) Akudo Sabi
- (Russia) Ekaterina Sochneva
- (Spain) Jade Boho
- (United States) Amy Rodriguez

1 goal

- (Australia) Selin Kuralay
- (Australia) Kylie Ledbrook
- (Brazil) Kelly
- (Canada) Tanya Dennis
- (Canada) Aysha Jamani
- (Canada) Kara Lang
- (Canada) Jodi-Ann Robinson
- (China) Liu Sa
- (China) Wang Kun
- (China) Xu Yuan
- (Germany) Anna Blässe
- (Germany) Annike Krahn
- (Italy) Raffaella Manieri
- (Nigeria) Stella Godwin
- (Nigeria) Nkese Udoh
- (Nigeria) Cynthia Uwak
- (Russia) Olga Petrova
- (Russia) Elena Terekhova
- (Russia) Svetlana Tsidikova
- (Russia) Ksenia Tsybutovich
- (South Korea) Lee Jang-mi
- (South Korea) Park Eun-Sun
- (South Korea) Park Hee-young
- (Spain) Nuria Zufia
- (United States) Kerri Hanks
- (United States) Sheree Gray

Own goals

- (Germany) Annike Krahn (1) (for United States)
- (Italy) Fabiana Costi (1) (for Brazil)
- (Spain) Zurine Gil Garcia (1) (for Russia)
- (Thailand) Thidarat Wiwasukhu (1) (for Australia)
