= Danish women's football clubs in international competitions =

This is a compilation of the results of the teams representing Denmark at official international women's football competitions, that is the UEFA Women's Cup and its successor, the UEFA Women's Champions League.

As of the 2016–17 edition Denmark is ranked 7th in the UWCL's association standings, and it is thus one of twelve associations currently granted two spots in the competition. Its major success to date is Fortuna Hjørring's appearance in the 2002–03 edition's final.

== Teams ==
These are the three teams that have represented Denmark in the UEFA Women's Cup and the UEFA Women's Champions League.

Club	Founded	Region	Location	Appearances	First	Last	Best result
Brøndby		Capital Region	Brøndby	15	2003–04	2017–18	3 / 7 - Semifinals
Fortuna Hjørring	1996	North Denmark	Hjørring	10	2002–03	2017–18	2 / 7 - Finalist
Odense	1989	Southern Denmark	Odense	1	2001–02	2001–02	4 / 7 - Quarterfinals

Location of the teams within Denmark

== Historical progression ==
Season	Teams	Earlier rounds	Round of 32	Round of 16	Quarterfinals	Semifinals	Final
2001–02 UWC	Odense		(Serbia and Montenegro) Mašinac ^{1}	Not held	(Germany) Frankfurt		
2002–03 UWC	Fortuna Hjørring		(Belarus) Bobruichanka ^{1}	Not held	(Norway) Ørn	(England) Arsenal	(Sweden) Umeå
2003–04 UWC	Brøndby		(Serbia and Montenegro) Mašinac ^{1}	Not held	(Azerbaijan) Gömrükçü	(Sweden) Umeå	
2004–05 UWC	Brøndby			(Russia) Energiya ^{1}			
2005–06 UWC	Brøndby			(Russia) Lada ^{1}	(France) Montpellier		
2006–07 UWC	Brøndby			(Russia) Rossiyanka ^{1}	(Germany) Turbine	(England) Arsenal	
2007–08 UWC	Brøndby			(Norway) Kolbotn ^{1}	(Italy) Bardolino		
2008–09 UWC	Brøndby			(Spain) Levante ^{1}	(Russia) Zvezda		
2009–10 UWCL	Brøndby	(Portugal) 1º Dezembro ^{1}	(Netherlands) AZ	(Germany) Turbine			
2009–10 UWCL	Fortuna Hjørring		(Italy) Bardolino	(France) Lyon			
2010–11 UWCL	Brøndby	(Bulgaria) NSA ^{1}	(Poland) Unia	(England) Everton			
2010–11 UWCL	Fortuna Hjørring		(Italy) Bardolino	(Germany) Duisburg			
2011–12 UWCL	Brøndby		(Belgium) Standard	(Italy) Torres	(France) Lyon		
2011–12 UWCL	Fortuna Hjørring		(Switzerland) YB-Frauen	(Sweden) Göteborg			
2012–13 UWCL	Brøndby		(Norway) Stabæk				
2012–13 UWCL	Fortuna Hjørring		(Scotland) Glasgow	(Sweden) Göteborg			
2013–14 UWCL	Brøndby		(Spain) Barcelona				
2013–14 UWCL	Fortuna Hjørring		(Italy) Tavagnacco	(Sweden) Tyresö			
2014–15 UWCL	Brøndby		(Cyprus) Apollon	(Lithuania) Universitetas	(Sweden) Linköping		
2014–15 UWCL	Fortuna Hjørring		(Portugal) Atlético	(Sweden) Rosengård			
2015–16 UWCL	Brøndby		(Czech Republic) Slavia				
2015–16 UWCL	Fortuna Hjørring		(Belarus) Minsk	(Italy) Brescia			
2016–17 UWCL	Brøndby		(Austria) Spratzern	(England) Manchester			
2016–17 UWCL	Fortuna Hjørring		(Spain) Athletic	(Italy) Brescia	(England) Manchester		
2017–18 UWCL	Brøndby		(Norway) Lillestrøm				
2017–18 UWCL	Fortuna Hjørring		(Italy) Fiorentina				

== Results by team ==
=== Brøndby ===
2003–04 UEFA Women's Cup
Round	Opponent	1st	2nd	Agg.	Scorers
Last 32 (group stage)	(Scotland) Kilmarnock	2–0			Kjær-Jensen - Munch
Last 32 (group stage)	(Iceland) KR	1–0			Paaske-Sørensen
Last 32 (group stage)	(Serbia and Montenegro) Mašinac Niš	4–0		9 points	Falk - Kjær-Jensen - Larsen - Munch
Quarterfinals	(Azerbaijan) Gömrükçü Baku	h: 9–0	a: 3–0	12–0	Bukh - K.-Jensen 2 - Johansen 2 - Andersen - Falk - Jørgensen - Larsen - Munch - Olsen - P.-Sørensen
Semifinals	(Sweden) Umeå	h: 2–3	a: 0–1	2–4	Larsen - Paaske-Sørensen

2004–05 UEFA Women's Cup
Round	Opponent	1st	2nd	Agg.	Scorers
Last 16 (group stage)	(Russia) Energiya Voronezh	1–1			Paaske-Sørensen
Last 16 (group stage)	(Kazakhstan) Alma	2–0			Munch - Olsen
Last 16 (group stage)	(Norway) Trondheims-Ørn	0–2		4 points	

2005–06 UEFA Women's Cup
Round	Opponent	1st	2nd	Agg.	Scorers
Last 16 (group stage)	(Russia) Lada Togliatti	2–0			Paaske-Sørensen 2
Last 16 (group stage)	(Poland) Wroclaw	3–1			Kjær-Jensen 2 - Jørgensen
Last 16 (group stage)	(England) Arsenal	1–0		9 points	Kjær-Jensen
Quarterfinals	(France) Montpellier	a: 0–3	h: 1–3	1–6	Jørgensen

2006–07 UEFA Women's Cup
Round	Opponent	1st	2nd	Agg.	Scorers
Last 16 (group stage)	(Hungary) Femina Budapest	5–1			Paaske-Sørensen 3 - Konge - Rydahl-Bukh
Last 16 (group stage)	(Russia) Rossiyanka (host)	2–1			Eggers-Nielsen - Nielsen
Last 16 (group stage)	(England) Arsenal	0–1		9 points	
Quarterfinals	(Germany) Turbine Potsdam	h: 3–0	a: 1–2	4–2	Falk - Kjær-Jensen - Nielsen - Paaske-Sørensen
Semifinals	(England) Arsenal	h: 2–2	a: 0–3	2–5	L. Jensen - Pape

2007–08 UEFA Women's Cup
Round	Opponent	1st	2nd	Agg.	Scorers
Last 16 (group stage)	(France) Olympique Lyon (host)	0–0			
Last 16 (group stage)	(Czech Republic) Sparta Prague	2–1			L. Jensen
Last 16 (group stage)	(Norway) Kolbotn	1–0		7 points	Olsen
Quarterfinals	(Italy) Bardolino	a: 1–0	h: 0–1 (aet)	1–1 (p: 2–3)	Mejer-Christensen

2008–09 UEFA Women's Cup
Round	Opponent	1st	2nd	Agg.	Scorers
Last 16 (group stage)	(Spain) Levante	1–0			
Last 16 (group stage)	(Ukraine) Naftokhimik Kalush (host)	5–1			
Last 16 (group stage)	(Germany) Duisburg	1–4		6 points	
Quarterfinals	(Russia) Zvezda Perm	h: 2–4	a: 1–3	3–7	Pape 2 - Mejer-Christensen

2009–10 UEFA Women's Champions League
Round	Opponent	1st	2nd	Agg.	Scorers
Qualifiers (group stage)	(Wales) Cardiff City	5–0			
Qualifiers (group stage)	(Malta) Birkirkara	6–0			
Qualifiers (group stage)	(Portugal) SU 1º Dezembro	1–0		9 points	
Last 32	(Netherlands) AZ	a: 2–1	h: 1–1	3–2	N. Christiansen 2 - Madsen
Last 16	(Germany) Turbine Potsdam	a: 0–1	h: 0–4	0–5	

2010–11 UEFA Women's Champions League
Round	Opponent	1st	2nd	Agg.	Scorers
Qualifiers (group stage)	(Moldova) Roma Calfa	6–0			Salling-Dahl 2 - T. Nielsen 2 - Ancker - Kærgaard-Rasmussen
Qualifiers (group stage)	(Turkey) Gazi Üniversitesispor	12–0			Madsen 2 - S.-Dahl 2 - Tr.-Nielsen 2 - Ancker - Andersen - Brændstrup - K.-Larsen - T. Nielsen - Olsen
Qualifiers (group stage)	(Bulgaria) NSA Sofia	3–0		9 points	Madsen - Revsbeck-Jensen - Salling-Dahl
Last 32	(Poland) Unia Racibórz	a: 2–1	h: 0–1	2–2 (agr)	Andersen - Kur-Larsen
Last 16	(England) Everton	h: 1–4	a: 1–1	2–5	Kur-Larsen - Troelsgaard-Nielsen

2011–12 UEFA Women's Champions League
Round	Opponent	1st	2nd	Agg.	Scorers
Last 32	(Belgium) Standard Liège	a: 2–0	h: 3–4	5–4	Overgaard-Munk 3 - N. Christiansen - Rydahl-Bukh
Last 16	(Italy) Torres	h: 2–1	a: 3–1	5–2	Overgaard-Munk 3 - Luik - Rydahl-Bukh
Quarterfinals	(France) Olympique Lyonnais	a: 0–4	h: 0–4	0–8	

2012–13 UEFA Women's Champions League
Round	Opponent	1st	2nd	Agg.	Scorers
Last 32	(Norway) Stabæk	a: 0–2	h: 3–3	3–5	N. Christiansen - Overgaard-Munk

2013–14 UEFA Women's Champions League
Round	Opponent	1st	2nd	Agg.	Scorers
Last 32	(Spain) Barcelona	a: 0–0	h: 2–2	2–2 (agr)	Boye-Sørensen - Thorsen

2014–15 UEFA Women's Champions League
Round	Opponent	1st	2nd	Agg.	Scorers
Last 32	(Cyprus) Apollon Limassol	a: 0–1	h: 3–1 (aet)	3–2	Boye-Sørensen - Madsen - Grønbaek-Thestrup
Last 16	(Lithuania) Gintra Universitetas	h: 5–0	a: 0–2	5–2	Madsen 2 - Abu Alful - Lahmti - Nielsen
Quarterfinals	(Sweden) Linköping	a: 1–0	h: 1–1	2–1	Madsen
Semifinals	(Germany) Frankfurt	a: 0–7	h: 0–6	0–13	

2015–16 UEFA Women's Champions League
Round	Opponent	1st	2nd	Agg.	Scorers
Last 32	(Czech Republic) Slavia Prague	a: 1–4	h: 1–0	2–4	Boye-Sørensen - Kristensen

2016–17 UEFA Women's Champions League
Round	Opponent	1st	2nd	Agg.	Scorers
Last 32	(Austria) St. Pölten-Spratzern	a: 2–0	h: 2–2	4–2	N. Sørensen 3 - Boye-Sørensen
Last 16	(England) Manchester City	a: 0–1	h: 1–1	1–2	N. Christiansen

2017–18 UEFA Women's Champions League
Round	Opponent	1st	2nd	Agg.	Scorers
Round of 32	(Norway) Lillestrøm	a: 0–0	h: 1–3	1–3	Larsen

=== Fortuna Hjørring ===
2002–03 UEFA Women's Cup
Round	Opponent	1st	2nd	Agg.	Scorers
Last 32 (group stage)	(Moldova) Codru Anenii Noi	5–0			Bonde - M. Christensen - Knudsen - McCormack - Rasmussen
Last 16 (group stage)	(Iceland) Breiðablik	9–0			Black 2 - M. Christensen 2 - Madsen 2 - Bonde - McCormack - Rasmussen
Last 16 (group stage)	(Belarus) Babruyshanka (host)	3–0		9 points	Forman 2 - L. Madsen
Quarterfinals	(Norway) Trondheims-Ørn	a: 2–2	h: 1–0	3–2	Bonde - Forman - Gajhede
Semifinals	(England) Arsenal	h: 3–1	a: 5–1	8–2	Bonde 3 - Black 2 - B. Christensen - M. Christensen - Forman
Final	(Sweden) Umeå	a: 1–4	h: 0–3	1–7	J. Madsen

2009–10 UEFA Women's Champions League
Round	Opponent	1st	2nd	Agg.	Scorers
Last 32	(Italy) Bardolino	h: 4–0	a: 1–2	5–2	Igbo - Krogh-Christensen - Mejer-Christensen - Overgaard-Munk
Last 16	(France) Olympique Lyonnais	h: 0–1	a: 0–5	0–6	

2010–11 UEFA Women's Champions League
Round	Opponent	1st	2nd	Agg.	Scorers
Last 32	(Italy) Bardolino	h: 8–0	a: 6–1	14–1	Paaske-Sørensen 7 - Arnth-Jensen 2 - Mogensen 2 - Igbo - Jensen - Rydahl-Bukh
Last 16	(Germany) Duisburg	a: 2–4	h: 0–3	2–7	Arnth-Jensen - K. Pedersen

2011–12 UEFA Women's Champions League
Round	Opponent	1st	2nd	Agg.	Scorers
Last 32	(Switzerland) Young Boys	a: 3–0	h: 2–1	5–1	K. Pedersen 2 - Arnth-Jensen - Carroll - Khamis
Last 16	(Sweden) Göteborg	h: 0–1	a: 2–3	2–4	Khamis - Woods

2012–13 UEFA Women's Champions League
Round	Opponent	1st	2nd	Agg.	Scorers
Last 32	(Scotland) Glasgow City	a: 2–1	h: 0–0	2–1	Nadim 2
Last 16	(Sweden) Göteborg	h: 1–1	a: 2–3	3–4	Arnth-Jensen - Nadim - Pedersen

2013–14 UEFA Women's Champions League
Round	Opponent	1st	2nd	Agg.	Scorers
Last 32	(Italy) Tavagnacco	a: 2–3	h: 2–0	4–3	Arnth-Jensen - Kur-Larsen - Rus - Spânu
Last 16	(Sweden) Tyresö	h: 1–2	a: 0–4	1–6	Nadim

2014–15 UEFA Women's Champions League
Round	Opponent	1st	2nd	Agg.	Scorers
Last 32	(Portugal) Atlético Ouriense	a: 3–0	h: 6–0	9–0	Nadim 3 - Kur-Larsen 2 - Hovesen - Junge-Pedersen - Sigvardsen-Jensen - Thøgersen
Last 16	(Sweden) Rosengård	a: 1–2	h: 0–2	1–4	Junge-Pedersen

2015–16 UEFA Women's Champions League
Round	Opponent	1st	2nd	Agg.	Scorers
Last 32	(Belarus) Minsk	a: 2–0	h: 4–0	6–0	Nadim 3 - Spânu 2 - Sigvardsen-Jensen
Last 16	(Italy) Brescia	a: 0–1	h: 1–1	1–2	Nadim

2016–17 UEFA Women's Champions League
Round	Opponent	1st	2nd	Agg.	Scorers
Last 32	(Spain) Athletic Bilbao	a: 1–2	h: 3–1 aet)	4–3	Damjanović - Kur-Larsen - Smidt-Nielsen - Tamires
Last 16	(Italy) Brescia	a: 1–0	h: 3–1	4–1	Kur-Larsen 2 - Olar - Tamires
Quarterfinals	(England) Manchester City	h: 0–1	h: 0–1	0–2	

2017–18 UEFA Women's Champions League
Round	Opponent	1st	2nd	Agg.	Scorers
Round of 32	(Italy) Fiorentina	a: 1–2	h: 0–0	1–2	Bruun

=== Odense ===
2001–02 UEFA Women's Cup
Round	Opponent	1st	2nd	Agg.	Scorers
Last 32 (group stage)	(Portugal) Gatões	3–0			Møller - M. Pedersen - S. Pedersen
Last 16 (group stage)	(Luxembourg) Progrès Niedercorn	13–0			M. Pedersen 5 - Bülow 2 - S. Pedersen 2 - Jakobsen - Kjær Thomsen - Lund - Møller
Last 16 (group stage)	(Serbia and Montenegro) Mašinac Niš	3–1		9 points	M. Pedersen 2 - Møller
Quarterfinals	(Germany) Frankfurt	h: 0–3	a: 1–2	1–5	S. Pedersen
