= Kim Yu-mi =

Kim Yu-mi may refer to:

- Yumi Kim, a women's clothing brand
- Yumi Hogan (born 1959), First Lady of Maryland
- Kim Yoo-mi (actress) (born 1980), South Korean actress
- Kim Yu-mi (beauty pageant titleholder) (born 1990), South Korean beauty pageant titleholder and actress
- Kim Yu-mi (footballer) (born 1979), South Korean footballer
