= Li Jie (footballer) =

Chinese footballer (born 1979)

Medal record

Women's football

Representing China

Asian Games
Silver medal – second place	2002 Busan	Team
Bronze medal – third place	2006 Doha	Team

Li Jie (simplified Chinese: 李洁; traditional Chinese: 李潔; pinyin: Lǐ Jié; born 8 July 1979, in Beijing) is a Chinese football player who competed at the 2004 Summer Olympics and the 2007 FIFA Women's World Cup, the latter on home soil.

== International goals ==
No.	Date	Venue	Opponent	Score	Result	Competition
1.	11 October 2002	Changwon Stadium, Changwon, South Korea	South Korea	1–0	4–0	2002 Asian Games
2.	4 December 2006	Thani bin Jassim Stadium, Al-Rayyan, Qatar	Jordan	10–0	12–0	2006 Asian Games
3.	12 September 2007	Wuhan Sports Center, Wuhan, China	Denmark	1–0	3–2	2007 FIFA Women's World Cup
4.	20 September 2007	Tianjin Olympic Center Stadium, Tianjin, China	New Zealand	1–0	2–0	2007 FIFA Women's World Cup

== See also ==
- List of women's footballers with 100 or more international caps
