= Song Xiaoli =

Chinese footballer

Personal information
- Date of birth: 21 July 1981 (age 45)
- Place of birth: Jiangyan County, Jiangsu, China
- Position: Midfielder

Senior career*
Years	Team	Apps	(Gls)
- Jiangsu Shuntian

International career^{‡}
	China	10	(1)
- * Club domestic league appearances and goals ‡ National team caps and goals as of 10 September 2007 (before the 2007 FIFA Women's World Cup)

Song Xiaoli (Chinese: 宋晓丽; born 21 July 1981) is a Chinese women's international footballer who plays as a midfielder. She is a member of the China women's national football team. She was part of the team at the 2007 FIFA Women's World Cup. On club level she plays for Jiangsu Shuntian in China.

Song married footballer Liu Tao on 5 November 2011.

== International goals ==
No.	Date	Venue	Opponent	Score	Result	Competition
1.	12 September 2007	Wuhan Sports Center, Wuhan, China	Denmark	3–1	3–2	2007 FIFA Women's World Cup
