= Thidarat Wiwasukhu =

Thai footballer and manager (born 1985)

Personal information
- Date of birth: 18 February 1985 (age 41)
- Height: 1.69 m (5 ft 7 in)
- Position: Defender

Team information
- Current team: Thailand (assistant)

International career^{‡}
Years	Team	Apps	(Gls)
2004	Thailand U19	3	(0)
2007–2011	Thailand	4+	(0)
- ‡ National team caps and goals as of 22 May 2010.

Thidarat Wiwasukhu (Thai: ธิดารัตน์ วิวาสุข; born 18 February 1985) is a Thai football manager and former player, who is the assistant coach of the Thailand.

== International career ==
Thidarat represented Thailand at the 2004 FIFA U-19 Women's World Championship. She capped at senior level during the 2007 Southeast Asian Games, two AFC Women's Asian Cup editions (2008 and 2010), the 2010 Asian Games and the 2012 AFC Women's Olympic Qualifying Tournament.
