= 2008 AFC Women's Asian Cup =

Tournament details
- Host country: Vietnam
- Dates: 28 May – 8 June
- Teams: 8 (from 1 confederation)
- Venues: 2 (in 1 host city)

Final positions
- Champions: North Korea (3rd title)
- Runners-up: China
- Third place: Japan
- Fourth place: Australia

Tournament statistics
- Matches played: 16
- Goals scored: 57 (3.56 per match)
- Attendance: 21,950 (1,372 per match)
- Top scorer: (North Korea) Ri Kum-suk (7 goals)

The 2008 AFC Women's Asian Cup was played in Vietnam from 28 May to 8 June 2008. It was won by North Korea.

== Seedings ==
The draw was held on 18 April 2008 in Ho Chi Minh City, Vietnam.

1. China
2. Australia
3. North Korea
4. Japan
5. Chinese Taipei
6. South Korea
7. Thailand
8. Vietnam (host nation)

== Venues ==
The tournament was held entirely in the following two venues. Both are in Ho Chi Minh City.

- Thống Nhất Stadium
- Army Stadium

== Group stage ==
All times UTC+7

=== Group A ===
| Team | Pld | W | D | L | GF | GA | GD | Pts |
|---|---|---|---|---|---|---|---|---|
| North Korea | 3 | 3 | 0 | 0 | 9 | 0 | +9 | 9 |
| China | 3 | 2 | 0 | 1 | 6 | 2 | +4 | 6 |
| Vietnam | 3 | 1 | 0 | 2 | 1 | 4 | −3 | 3 |
| Thailand | 3 | 0 | 0 | 3 | 1 | 11 | −10 | 0 |

Source: RSSSF
28 May 2008
17:00

| North Korea | 5–0 | Thailand |
|---|---|---|
| Kim Kyong-hwa 8', 39'; Ri Kum-suk 30'; Ri Un-suk 51'; Kim Yong-ae 90+1' | Report (AFC); Report |

Thống Nhất Stadium, Ho Chi Minh City
Attendance: 2,000
Referee: Tammy Ogston (Australia)
28 May 2008
19:30

| China | 1–0 | Vietnam |
|---|---|---|
| Xu Yuan 31' | Report (AFC); Report |

Thống Nhất Stadium, Ho Chi Minh City
Attendance: 5,500
Referee: Hong Eun-ah (South Korea)

30 May 2008
17:00

| Vietnam | 0–3 | North Korea |
|---|---|---|
| | Report (AFC); Report | Ri Un-gyong 11' (pen.); Ri Kum-suk 39', 67' |

Thống Nhất Stadium, Ho Chi Minh City
Attendance: 1,700
Referee: Hong Eun-Ah (South Korea)
30 May 2008
19:30

| Thailand | 1–5 | China |
|---|---|---|
| Nisa 37' | Report (AFC); Report | Liu Sa 11'; Qu Feifei 20', 73'; Xu Yuan 22'; Pu Wei 86' |

Thống Nhất Stadium, Ho Chi Minh City
Attendance: 300
Referee: Sachiko Baba (Japan)

1 June 2008
18:30

| China | 0–1 | North Korea |
|---|---|---|
| | Report (AFC); Report | Ri Un-gyong 34' |

Army Stadium, Ho Chi Minh City
Attendance: 200
Referee: Tammy Ogston (Australia)
1 June 2008
18:30

| Vietnam | 1–0 | Thailand |
|---|---|---|
| Đoàn Thị Kim Chi 70' | Report (AFC); Report |

Thống Nhất Stadium, Ho Chi Minh City
Attendance: 2,500
Referee: Sachiko Baba (Japan)

=== Group B ===
| Team | Pld | W | D | L | GF | GA | GD | Pts |
|---|---|---|---|---|---|---|---|---|
| Japan | 3 | 2 | 0 | 1 | 15 | 4 | +11 | 6 |
| Australia | 3 | 2 | 0 | 1 | 7 | 3 | +4 | 6 |
| South Korea | 3 | 2 | 0 | 1 | 5 | 3 | +2 | 6 |
| Chinese Taipei | 3 | 0 | 0 | 3 | 0 | 17 | −17 | 0 |

Source: RSSSF
29 May 2008
17:00

| Australia | 4–0 | Chinese Taipei |
|---|---|---|
| Garriock 19', 42'; Tristram 51'; De Vanna 82' | Report (AFC); Report |

Thống Nhất Stadium, Ho Chi Minh City
Attendance: 600
Referee: Ri Hong-sil (North Korea)
29 May 2008
19:30

| Japan | 1–3 | South Korea |
|---|---|---|
| Nagasato 10' | Report (AFC); Report | Cha Yun-hee 18'; Park Hee-young 31', 54' |

Thống Nhất Stadium, Ho Chi Minh City
Attendance: 600
Referee: Bentla D'Coth (India)

31 May 2008
17:00

| Chinese Taipei | 0–11 | Japan |
|---|---|---|
| | Report (AFC); Report | Sameshima 21'; Utsugi 29', 65'; Ando 51'; Arakawa 55'; Maruyama 66', 89'; Goto 76'; Kato 81'; Lee Hsiu-chin 82' (o.g.); Nagasato 90+1' |

Thống Nhất Stadium, Ho Chi Minh City
Attendance: 300
Referee: Pannipar Kamnueng (Thailand)
31 May 2008
19:30

| South Korea | 0–2 | Australia |
|---|---|---|
| | Report (AFC); Report | Perry 30'; De Vanna 69' |

Thống Nhất Stadium, Ho Chi Minh City
Attendance: 300
Referee: Bentla D'Coth (India)

2 June 2008
17:00

| Australia | 1–3 | Japan |
|---|---|---|
| Polkinghorne 70' | Report (AFC); Report | Ando 8'; Nagasato 33'; Miyama 50' |

Thống Nhất Stadium, Ho Chi Minh City
Attendance: 300
Referee: Ri Hong-sil (North Korea)
2 June 2008
17:00

| South Korea | 2–0 | Chinese Taipei |
|---|---|---|
| Kim Yu-mi 23'; Kim Soo-yun 90+2' | Report (AFC); Report |

Army Stadium, Ho Chi Minh City
Attendance: 250
Referee: Pannipar Kamnueng (Thailand)

== Knockout stage ==
All times UTC+7

Semi-finals
5 June
North Korea | 3
Australia | 0
5 June
Japan | 1
China | 3

Final
8 June
North Korea | 2
China | 1
Third place
8 June
Australia | 0
Japan | 3

=== Semi-final ===
5 June 2008
16:00

| North Korea | 3–0 | Australia |
|---|---|---|
| Ri Kum-suk 2', 41', 60' | Report (AFC); Report |

Thống Nhất Stadium, Ho Chi Minh City
Attendance: 2,700
Referee: Pannipar Kamnueng (Thailand)
5 June 2008
19:00

| Japan | 1–3 | China |
|---|---|---|
| Sawa 47' | Report (AFC); Report | Wang Dandan 63', 68'; Han Duan 75' |

Thống Nhất Stadium, Ho Chi Minh City
Attendance: 1,000
Referee: Bentla D'Coth (India)

=== Third place match ===
8 June 2008
16:00

| Australia | 0–3 | Japan |
|---|---|---|
| | Report (AFC); Report | Nagasato 15'; Miyama 78'; Sawa 86' |

Thống Nhất Stadium, Ho Chi Minh City
Attendance: 1,200
Referee: Hong Eun-ah (South Korea)

=== Final ===
8 June 2008
19:00

| North Korea | 2–1 | China |
|---|---|---|
| Ri Kum-suk 55'; Ri Yong-ae 68' | Report (AFC); Report | Bi Yan 12' |

Thống Nhất Stadium, Ho Chi Minh City
Attendance: 2,500
Referee: Sachiko Baba (Japan)

== Awards ==
2008 AFC Women's Championship winners

North Korea
Third title

== Goalscorers ==
There were 57 goals scored in 16 matches, for an average of 3.56 goals per match.

7 goals

- (North Korea) Ri Kum-suk

4 goals

- (Japan) Yuki Nagasato

2 goals

- (Australia) Heather Garriock
- (Australia) Lisa De Vanna
- (China) Qu Feifei
- (China) Wang Dandan
- (China) Xu Yuan
- (South Korea) Park Hee-young
- (Japan) Aya Miyama
- (Japan) Homare Sawa
- (Japan) Karina Maruyama
- (Japan) Kozue Ando
- (Japan) Rumi Utsugi
- (North Korea) Kim Kyong-hwa
- (North Korea) Ri Un-gyong

1 goal

- (Australia) Clare Polkinghorne
- (Australia) Ellyse Perry
- (Australia) Jenna Tristram
- (China) Bi Yan
- (China) Han Duan
- (China) Liu Sa
- (China) Pu Wei
- (Japan) Aya Sameshima
- (Japan) Eriko Arakawa
- (Japan) Michi Goto
- (Japan) Tomoe Kato
- (South Korea) Cha Yun-hee
- (South Korea) Kim Soo-yun
- (South Korea) Kim Yu-mi
- (North Korea) Kim Yong-ae
- (North Korea) Ri Un-suk
- (North Korea) Ri Yong-ae
- (Thailand) Nisa Romyen
- (Vietnam) Đoàn Thị Kim Chi

1 own goal

- (Chinese Taipei) Lee Hsiu-chin (against Japan)
