= Liu Tao (footballer) =

Chinese footballer

Liu Tao 刘涛
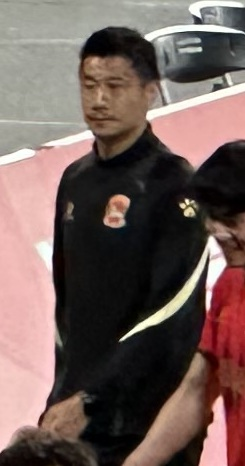
- Liu in 2025

Personal information
- Date of birth: 22 January 1985 (age 41)
- Place of birth: Wujiang, Jiangsu, China
- Height: 1.85 m (6 ft 1 in)
- Position: Defender

Team information
- Current team: Guangdong GZ-Power (assistant coach)

Youth career
- 1998–2005: Jiangsu Youth

Senior career*
Years	Team	Apps	(Gls)
2006–2010	Jiangsu Sainty	25	(0)
2011–2012	Tianjin Songjiang	44	(7)
2013–2014	Guangdong Sunray Cave	51	(3)
2015–2016	Dalian Transcendence	36	(5)
2017	Shenzhen Ledman	22	(2)
2018	Suzhou Dongwu	21	(1)
2019–2024	Chengdu Rongcheng	124	(8)
2025	Suzhou Dongwu	0	(0)

Managerial career
- 2026–: Guangdong GZ-Power (assistant)
- * Club domestic league appearances and goals as of 8 January 2023

Liu Tao (Chinese: 刘涛; pinyin: Liú Tāo; born 22 January 1985) is a Chinese football coach and retired professional footballer who played as a defender.

== Career ==
Liu started his professional football career in 2006 when he was promoted into China League One side Jiangsu Sainty first team. He would eventually make his league debut for Jiangsu on 24 October 2009 in a game against Shandong Luneng Taishan. In March 2011, he made a free transfer to Tianjin Songjiang and signed a two-year-contract with the club. Liu joined Guangdong Sunray Cave along with his teammate Wang Qiang in January 2013.

On 16 February 2015, Liu transferred to China League Two side Dalian Transcendence. On 23 January 2017, Liu moved to League Two side Shenzhen Ledman. In March 2018, Liu transferred to his hometown club Suzhou Dongwu in the China League Two. On 27 February 2019, Liu transferred to League Two newcomer Chengdu Better City. He would go on to win promotion with the club as they came runners-up at the end of the 2019 China League Two season. He would be a vital part of the team as the club gained promotion to the top tier at the end of the 2021 league campaign.

On 28 January 2026, Liu retired from professional football and joined Guangdong GZ-Power as assistant coach.

== Personal life ==
Liu married former China women's national football team midfielder Song Xiaoli on 5 November 2011.

== Career statistics ==
As of match played 8 January 2023

Appearances and goals by club, season and competition
Club	Season	League			National cup		Continental		Other		Total	
Club	Season	Division	Apps	Goals	Apps	Goals	Apps	Goals	Apps	Goals	Apps	Goals
Jiangsu Sainty	2006	China League One	1	0	0	0	–		–		1	0
Jiangsu Sainty	2007	China League One	22	0	–		–		–		22	0
Jiangsu Sainty	2008	China League One	1	0	–		–		–		1	0
Jiangsu Sainty	2009	Chinese Super League	1	0	–		–		–		1	0
Jiangsu Sainty	2010	Chinese Super League	0	0	–		–		–		0	0
Jiangsu Sainty	Total		25	0	0	0	0	0	0	0	25	0
Tianjin Songjiang	2011	China League One	17	4	0	0	–		–		17	4
Tianjin Songjiang	2012	China League One	27	3	1	0	–		–		28	3
Tianjin Songjiang	Total		44	7	1	0	0	0	0	0	45	7
Guangdong Sunray Cave	2013	China League One	28	2	2	0	–		–		30	2
Guangdong Sunray Cave	2014	China League One	23	1	1	0	–		–		24	1
Guangdong Sunray Cave	Total		51	3	3	0	0	0	0	0	54	3
Dalian Transcendence	2015	China League Two	19	4	3	1	–		–		22	5
Dalian Transcendence	2016	China League One	17	1	0	0	–		–		17	1
Dalian Transcendence	Total		36	5	3	1	0	0	0	0	39	6
Shenzhen Ledman	2017	China League Two	22	2	2	0	–		–		24	2
Suzhou Dongwu	2018	China League Two	21	1	2	0	–		–		23	1
Chengdu Rongcheng	2019	China League Two	26	3	1	1	–		–		27	4
Chengdu Rongcheng	2020	China League One	12	1	0	0	–		–		12	1
Chengdu Rongcheng	2021	China League One	33	1	0	0	–		2 (Note: Appearance(s) in CSL Relegation play-offs)	0	35	1
Chengdu Rongcheng	2022	Chinese Super League	32	2	0	0	–		–		32	2
Chengdu Rongcheng	Total		103	7	1	1	0	0	2	0	106	8
Career total			302	25	12	2	0	0	2	0	316	27

== Honours ==
Jiangsu Sainty

- China League One: 2008
