= Weng Xiaojie =

Chinese association football player

Personal information
- Date of birth: 27 July 1987 (age 39)
- Height: 1.74 m (5 ft 9 in)
- Position: Goalkeeper

International career
Years	Team	Apps	(Gls)
- China

Weng Xiaojie is a Chinese professional footballer who plays as a goalkeeper in the Chinese Women's Super League. She is also a member of the Chinese women's national football team. Xiaojie represented China in the 2008 AFC Women's Asian Cup.
