= Zhou Gaoping =

Chinese footballer

Personal information
- Date of birth: 20 October 1986 (age 40)
- Position: Defender

International career
Years	Team	Apps	(Gls)
2007–08	China		

Zhou Gaoping (born October 20, 1986, in Taizhou, Jiangsu) is a female Chinese football player who competed for the national team in the 2008 Summer Olympics. Her position is that of defender.

== Major performances ==
- 2007 World Cup - Quarterfinals;
- 2008 Asian Cup - 2nd
