= Tanja Mejer Christensen =

Danish association footballer

Personal information
- Date of birth: 22 March 1985 (age 41)
- Place of birth: Denmark
- Position: Forward

Senior career*
Years	Team	Apps	(Gls)
- Fortuna Hjørring

International career
- Denmark
- * Club domestic league appearances and goals

Tanja Mejer Christensen (born 22 March 1985) is a Danish retired midfielder who played for Fortuna Hjørring and the Danish national team.

== International career ==
Christensen was also part of the Danish team at the 2005 European Championships.

== Honours ==
- Danish League
  - Champion: 2009
