= Emily McColl =

New Zealand footballer (born 1985)

Personal information
- Full name: Emily McColl
- Date of birth: 1 November 1985 (age 40)
- Place of birth: Lower Hutt, New Zealand
- Height: 1.60 m (5 ft 3 in)
- Position: Midfielder

College career
| Years | Team | Apps | (Gls) |
| 2004–2008 | Coastal Carolina University | | |

Senior career*
| Years | Team | Apps | (Gls) |
- Cocoa Expos

International career
| 2007– | New Zealand | 19 | (0) |
- * Club domestic league appearances and goals

Emily McColl (born 1 November 1985) is an association football player who represented New Zealand at international level.

McColl made her Football Ferns début as a substitute in an 8–0 win over Solomon Islands on 11 April 2007 at the Oceania Olympic qualifying tournament held in Papua New Guinea, although was herself substituted later in the match after suffering heat stroke.

She represented New Zealand at the 2007 FIFA Women's World Cup finals in China, starting all three group matches as they lost to Brazil 0–5, Denmark (0–2) and China (0–2).

McColl was also included in the New Zealand squad for the 2008 Summer Olympics making a substitute appearance in the 2–2 draw with Japan in their opening game.
