= Heidi Johansen (footballer) =

Danish footballer (born 1983)

Personal information
- Full name: Heidi Elgaard Johansen
- Date of birth: 9 June 1983 (age 43)
- Place of birth: Denmark
- Position: Goalkeeper

Youth career
- –1999: SUB Sønderborg

Senior career*
| Years | Team | Apps | (Gls) |
| 1999–2003 | OB Odense | | |
| 2003–2013 | Fortuna Hjørring | | |

International career^{‡}
| 2000–2012 | Denmark | 80 | (0) |
- * Club domestic league appearances and goals ‡ National team caps and goals as of 5 October 2012

Heidi Elgaard Johansen (born 9 June 1983) is a Danish retired football goalkeeper who played for OB Odense, Fortuna Hjørring and the Danish national team.

Johansen was the Danish Women's Player of the Year in 2002.
