= Melanie Behringer =

German footballer (born 1985)

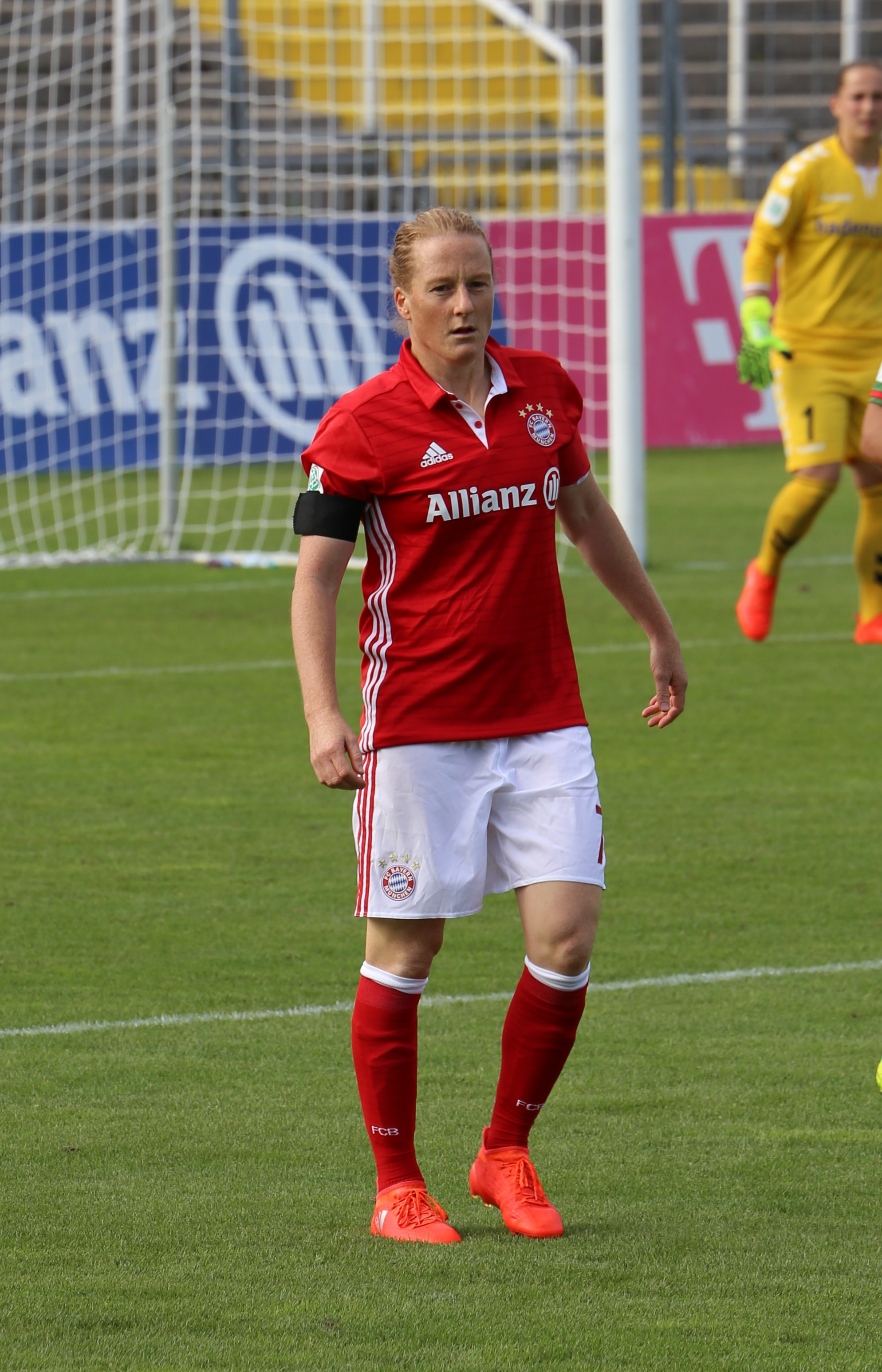
- Behringer with Bayern Munich in 2016

Personal information
- Full name: Melanie Behringer
- Date of birth: 18 November 1985 (age 40)
- Place of birth: Lörrach, West Germany
- Height: 1.72 m (5 ft 8 in)
- Position: Midfielder

Team information
- Current team: Germany U19 (manager)

Youth career
- SpVgg Utzenfeld

Senior career*
Years	Team	Apps	(Gls)
–2003	FC Hausen		
2003–2008	SC Freiburg	97	(30)
2008–2010	Bayern Munich	35	(9)
2010–2014	1. FFC Frankfurt	97	(20)
2014–2019	Bayern Munich	79	(21)

International career
2002–2004	Germany U19	30	(9)
2005–2006	Germany U21	9	(3)
2005–2016	Germany	123	(34)

Managerial career
- 2020–2022: SC Freiburg II
- 2023–2024: Germany U16
- 2024–2025: Germany U17
- 2025–: Germany U19
Medal record
Women's football
Representing Germany
FIFA Women's World Cup
Winner	2007 China
Olympic Games
Gold medal – first place	2016 Rio de Janeiro	Team
Bronze medal – third place	2008 Beijing	Team
UEFA Women's Championship
Winner	2009 Finland
Winner	2013 Sweden
Representing Germany (as manager)
UEFA Women's Under-19 Championship
Runner-up	2026 Bosnia and Herzegovina
- * Club domestic league appearances and goals

Melanie Behringer (born 18 November 1985) is a German professional football manager and former player who played as a midfielder. She was a Best FIFA Women's Player finalist. She is currently in charge of the Germany women's national under-19 team.

== Club career ==
Behringer started her career at SpVgg Utzenfeld and FC Hausen. In 2003, she joined SC Freiburg. She made her Bundesliga debut for Freiburg and played at the club for five seasons. For the 2008–09 season, Behringer transferred to FC Bayern Munich and finished second in the Bundesliga table in her first year in Munich. After two seasons, Behringer joined league rivals 1. FFC Frankfurt in 2010. She won the 2011 German Cup with Frankfurt, defeating 1. FFC Turbine Potsdam in the final. On 31 March 2016, Behringer extended her contract until 2019.

== International career ==
In 2004, Behringer was runner-up with Germany at the 2004 UEFA Women's U-19 Championship and later that year won the 2004 FIFA U-19 Women's World Championship. She scored in all three knockout round games of that tournament, including the final. She made her debut for the German senior national team in January 2005 against China.

She was part of Germany's World Cup winning squad at the 2007 FIFA Women's World Cup, starting in all six games. One year later, she won the bronze medal at the 2008 Summer Olympics and claimed the title at the 2009 European Championship. She scored a long-range goal in the final, for which she won Germany's Goal of the Month award. Behringer has been called up for Germany's 2011 FIFA Women's World Cup squad.

She was part of the squad for the 2016 Summer Olympics, where Germany won the gold medal.

She retired from international football on 23 August 2016.

== Career statistics ==
Scores and results list Germany's goal tally first, score column indicates score after each Behringer goal.

List of international goals scored by Melanie Behringer
No.	Date	Venue	Opponent	Score	Result	Competition
1	9 March 2006	Loulé, Portugal	Finland	4–0	5–0	2006 Algarve Cup
2	11 March 2006	Loulé, Portugal	Sweden	1–0	3–0	2006 Algarve Cup
3	12 March 2007	Vila Real de Santo António, Portugal	Denmark	3–0	3–0	2007 Algarve Cup
4	29 July 2007	Magdeburg, Germany	Denmark	1–0	4–0	Friendly
5	22 August 2007	Koblenz, Germany	Switzerland	2–0	7–0	UEFA Women's Euro 2009 qualifying
6	22 August 2007	Koblenz, Germany	Switzerland	5–0	7–0	UEFA Women's Euro 2009 qualifying
7	30 August 2007	Mainz, Germany	Norway	1–1	2–2	Friendly
8	10 September 2007	Shanghai, China	Argentina	1–0	11–0	2007 FIFA Women's World Cup
9	10 September 2007	Shanghai, China	Argentina	3–0	11–0	2007 FIFA Women's World Cup
10	29 May 2008	Kassel, Germany	Wales	4–0	4–0	UEFA Women's Euro 2009 qualifying
11	17 July 2008	Unterhaching, Germany	England	3–0	3–0	Friendly
12	1 October 2008	Basel, Switzerland	Switzerland	2–0	3–0	UEFA Women's Euro 2009 qualifying
13	4 March 2009	Albufeira, Portugal	Finland	1–0	2–0	2009 Algarve Cup
14	25 July 2009	Sinsheim, Germany	Netherlands	3–0	6–0	Friendly
15	27 August 2009	Tampere, Finland	France	3–0	5–1	UEFA Women's Euro 2009
16	10 September 2009	Helsinki, Finland	England	2–0	6–2	UEFA Women's Euro 2009
17	24 February 2010	Parchal, Portugal	Denmark	1–0	4–0	2010 Algarve Cup
18	15 September 2010	Dresden, Germany	Canada	4–0	5–0	Friendly
19	22 October 2011	Bucharest, Romania	Romania	3–0	3–0	UEFA Women's Euro 2013 qualifying
20	19 November 2011	Wiesbaden, Germany	Kazakhstan	9–0	17–0	UEFA Women's Euro 2013 qualifying
21	15 February 2012	İzmir, Turkey	Turkey	4–0	5–0	UEFA Women's Euro 2013 qualifying
22	15 February 2012	İzmir, Turkey	Turkey	5–0	5–0	UEFA Women's Euro 2013 qualifying
23	2 March 2012	Vila Real de Santo António, Portugal	China	1–0	1–0	2012 Algarve Cup
24	19 September 2012	Duisburg, Germany	Turkey	4–0	10–0	UEFA Women's Euro 2013 qualifying
25	19 September 2012	Duisburg, Germany	Turkey	5–0	10–0	UEFA Women's Euro 2013 qualifying
26	17 September 2014	Heidenheim, Germany	Republic of Ireland	1–0	2–0	2015 FIFA Women's World Cup qualification
27	7 June 2015	Ottawa, Canada	Ivory Coast	9–0	10–0	2015 FIFA Women's World Cup
28	18 September 2015	Halle, Germany	Hungary	4–0	12–0	UEFA Women's Euro 2017 qualifying
29	25 October 2015	Sandhausen, Germany	Turkey	3–0	7–0	UEFA Women's Euro 2017 qualifying
30	3 August 2016	São Paulo, Brazil	Zimbabwe	3–1	6–1	2016 Summer Olympics
31	3 August 2016	São Paulo, Brazil	Zimbabwe	4–1	6–1	2016 Summer Olympics
32	9 August 2016	Brasília, Brazil	Canada	1–0	1–2	2016 Summer Olympics
33	12 August 2016	Salvador, Brazil	China	1–0	1–0	2016 Summer Olympics
34	16 August 2016	Belo Horizonte, Brazil	Canada	1–0	2–0	2016 Summer Olympics

== Honours ==
=== As a player ===
1. FFC Frankfurt

- German Cup: 2010–11, 2013–14

Bayern München

- Bundesliga: 2014–15, 2015–16

Germany

- FIFA World Cup: 2007
- UEFA European Championship: 2009, 2013
- Summer Olympic Games: Bronze medal 2008, Gold medal 2016

Germany U20

- FIFA U-19 Women's World Championship: 2004

Germany U19

- UEFA Women's U-19 Championship: runner-up 2004
- Algarve Cup: 2006, 2012, 2014

Individual

- Football at the 2016 Summer Olympics: top scorer with five goals
- Silbernes Lorbeerblatt: 2007, 2016

=== As a manager ===
Germany U19

- UEFA Women's U-19 Championship runner-up: 2026
