= Jenny Bindon =

New Zealand football player and coach

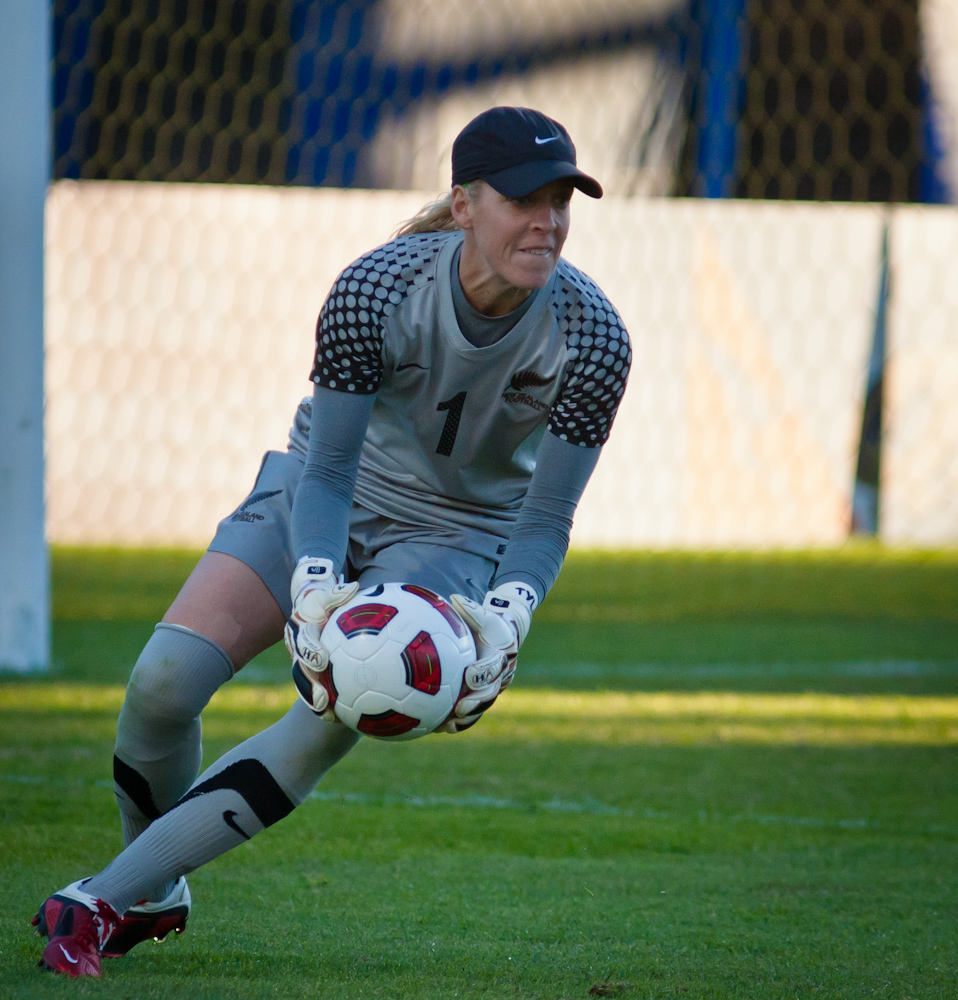
- Bindon in 2011

Personal information
- Full name: Jenny Lynn Bindon
- Date of birth: 25 February 1973 (age 53)
- Place of birth: Belleville, Illinois, U.S.
- Height: 1.75 m (5 ft 9 in)
- Position: Goalkeeper

Team information
- Current team: London City Lionesses (assistant coach)

Youth career
- 1979–1986: Belle-Clair Soccer

Senior career*
Years	Team	Apps	(Gls)
- Three Kings United
- Glenfield Rovers
- Bay Olympic
- Hibiscus Coast

International career^{‡}
2004–2014	New Zealand	77	(0)

Managerial career
- 2016: Takapuna (co-head coach)
- 2017–2019: UCLA Bruins (assistant/goalkeeping coach)
- 2020–2021: Loyola Marymount Lions
- 2023–: London City Lionesses (assistant coach)
- 2025–: New Zealand (assistant coach)
- * Club domestic league appearances and goals ‡ National team caps and goals as of 4 February 2014

Jenny Lynn Bindon (née Bourn; born 25 February 1973) is a football coach and former player who played goalkeeper. Born in the United States, she represented New Zealand at international level. She played 77 full internationals in between 2004 and 2010. She is currently an assistant coach of the London City Lionesses.

== High school ==
Jenny and her twin sister, Sarah, were multi-sport stars at Belleville West High School. The two participated in basketball, volleyball, softball, tennis, and cross country. Girls' soccer was not offered at the time.

== NCAA career ==
Bindon played basketball (1991–93), tennis (1991–92), and soccer (1992) for the Southern Illinois University Edwardsville Cougars. She left SIUE to enlist in the United States Coast Guard. After the Coast Guard, Bindon returned to the field in 1998 at Lewis University in Romeoville, Illinois, where she played soccer and basketball.

== International career ==
Bindon made her full Football Ferns debut in a 0–2 loss to Australia on 18 February 2004, and represented New Zealand at the 2007 FIFA Women's World Cup finals in China, where they lost to Brazil (0–5), Denmark (0–2) and China (0–2).

She was also included in the New Zealand squad for the 2008 Summer Olympics where they drew with Japan (2–2) before losing to Norway (0–1) and Brazil (0–4).

On 7 March 2011 Bindon earned her 50th A-international cap in a 5–2 loss to France in the Cyprus Cup, becoming the first New Zealand goalkeeper to reach the milestone.

At the 2012 London Olympics, Bindon played all 360 minutes in 4 matches played by New Zealand. She conceded 5 goals, 2 to the U.S. who sent them home with a 0–2 quarter-final defeat. Other goals conceded in group stage, to Great Britain (0–1), Brazil (0–1), and Cameroon (3–1); Her goalkeeping performance was critical to New Zealand advancing to second stage, since they advanced by better goal difference than North Korea.

At 39 years of age, she was the oldest competitor in 2012 Olympic women's football tournament. After her last match in 2012 Olympics, she did not rule out competing for the 2015 FIFA Women's World Cup in Canada, quote: "I've been asked that question many times because of my age. But there's no reason for me to stop as long as this smile stays on my face and my body keeps holding out."

Bindon announced her retirement from international football in February 2014.

== Coaching career ==
After retiring, Bindon later moved to coaching, which she has already pursued while as a player. Bindon served as the assistant coach and goalkeeper coach for the New Zealand under-17 women's team, and goalkeeper coach for the New Zealand under-20 and senior women's teams, and was joint head coach of third division Takapuna AFC during the 2016 NRFL season, the second female coach in that club to do so.

In February 2017 Bindon was named by the University of California, Los Angeles women's soccer team to be an assistant and goalkeeping coach. She coached in two College Cups in 2017 (Runner-Up) and 2019 (Final Four).

On 16 December 2019, Bindon was named head coach of the Loyola Marymount University (LMU) women's soccer team. She is the sixth head coach in programme history. Bindon was dismissed on 8 November 2021. Her teams posted a 1-26-1 record during two seasons, including a winless 0-19 campaign in her second year.

In October 2022, Bindon sued LMU for wrongful termination in Los Angeles County Superior Court, alleging defamation, retaliation, and gender discrimination. A hearing has been set for 19 April 2023, in Santa Monica.

On 12 May 2026, Auckland FC announced Bindon would manage the Auckland FC Women’s Invitational XI for a friendly against Chelsea F.C. Women. Bindon said she "jumped at" the opportunity to work with Auckland FC and lead the side against one of the world's best women's teams.

== Personal life ==
Bindon moved to New Zealand after her marriage to Grant Bindon, former captain of the New Zealand men's volleyball team, whom she met while they were students at Lewis University. They have one son, Tyler, who currently plays for Premier League club Nottingham Forest.
