= Nuria Zufía =

Spanish footballer (born 1985)

Personal information
- Full name: Nuria Zufía Elizalde
- Date of birth: 4 April 1985 (age 41)
- Place of birth: Pamplona, Spain
- Height: 1.76 m (5 ft 9 in)
- Position: Forward

College career
Years	Team	Apps	(Gls)
2006–2008	Clemson Tigers		

Senior career*
Years	Team	Apps	(Gls)
2002–2006	Lagunak		
2008–2010	Rayo Vallecano		
2010–2011	Torrejón		

International career
- Spain U19
2005	Spain	1	(0)
- * Club domestic league appearances and goals

Nuria Zufía Elizalde is a former Spanish football who played as a forward. She played for SD Lagunak, Rayo Vallecano (with whom she won two leagues) and AD Torrejón in Spain and Clemson Tigers in the United States. She retired at 26.

She won the 2004 U-19 European Championship and scored Spain's first goal at the subsequent U-20 World Cup.
