= Yumi Kim =

American fashion company

- Industry: Fashion
- Founded: 2004; New York City, U.S
- Founder: Kim Phan
- Headquarters: New York City, United States
- Key people: Kim Phan
- Website: www.yumikim.com

Yumi Kim is a women's clothing line, created by American fashion designer Kim Phan in New York City, United States.

== History ==
Kim Phan founded Yumi Kim in 2004, launching a brand that became known for its bold and vintage inspired floral prints. The brand's retail presence began with a physical store in 2008 on New York's Lower East Side. A year later, in 2009, an online store was opened to expand its reach. Following this growth, a second flagship store was established in 2011 on the Upper East Side.

In addition to its own retail locations, the brand's garments were featured on major online platforms such as Revolve.com and Rent the Runway. Yumi Kim also launched an exclusive maternity line in collaboration with the rental service Nuuly.

The Yumi Kim retail stores in New York closed in the spring of 2020 in response to the COVID-19 pandemic. During this time, the brand focused its operations on its online presence. In December 2024, Yumi Kim established a new flagship store in the Royal Hawaiian Center in Waikiki, Hawaii.
