= Xie Caixia =

Chinese footballer

Personal information
- Date of birth: 17 February 1976 (age 50)
- Position: Midfielder

Senior career*
Years	Team	Apps	(Gls)
- Guangdong Xiongying

International career^{‡}
	China	11	(1)
Medal record
Women's football
Representing China
Asian Games
Silver medal – second place	2002 Busan	Team
- * Club domestic league appearances and goals ‡ National team caps and goals as of 10 September 2007 (before the 2007 FIFA Women's World Cup)

Xie Caixia (born 17 February 1976) is a Chinese women's international footballer who plays as a midfielder. She is a member of the China women's national football team. She was part of the team at the 2007 FIFA Women's World Cup. On club level she plays for Guangdong Xiongying in China.
