= Emma Madsen =

Danish footballer (born 1988)

Personal information
- Full name: Emma Rise Madsen
- Date of birth: 18 November 1988 (age 37)
- Height: 1.79 m (5 ft 10 1/2 in)
- Position: Striker

Senior career*
Years	Team	Apps	(Gls)
–2008	Skovlunde IF		
2009–2015	Brøndby IF		

International career^{‡}
2005	Denmark U-17	8	(0)
2005–2007	Denmark U-19	28	(14)
2009–2011	Denmark U-23	3	(0)
2011–2013	Denmark	5	(0)
- * Club domestic league appearances and goals as of 08:12, 14 December 2022 (UTC) ‡ National team caps and goals as of 08:12, 14 December 2022 (UTC)

Emma Rise Madsen (born 18 November 1988) is a Danish former football striker. She played for Brøndby IF of the Elitedivisionen.

== Club career ==
Until 2008, she played for Skovlunde IF. She played for Brøndby IF since 2009. In 2015 she stopped her career.

== International career ==
Madsen was called up to be part of the national team for the UEFA Women's Euro 2013. She was a late replacement for Sanne Troelsgaard Nielsen, who withdrew for family reasons.

== Honours ==
=== Club ===
Brøndby IF

Winner

- Elitedivisionen: 2010–11, 2011–12, 2012–13
- Danish Women's Cup: 2010–11, 2011–12, 2012–13
