= Patricia Hanebeck =

German footballer

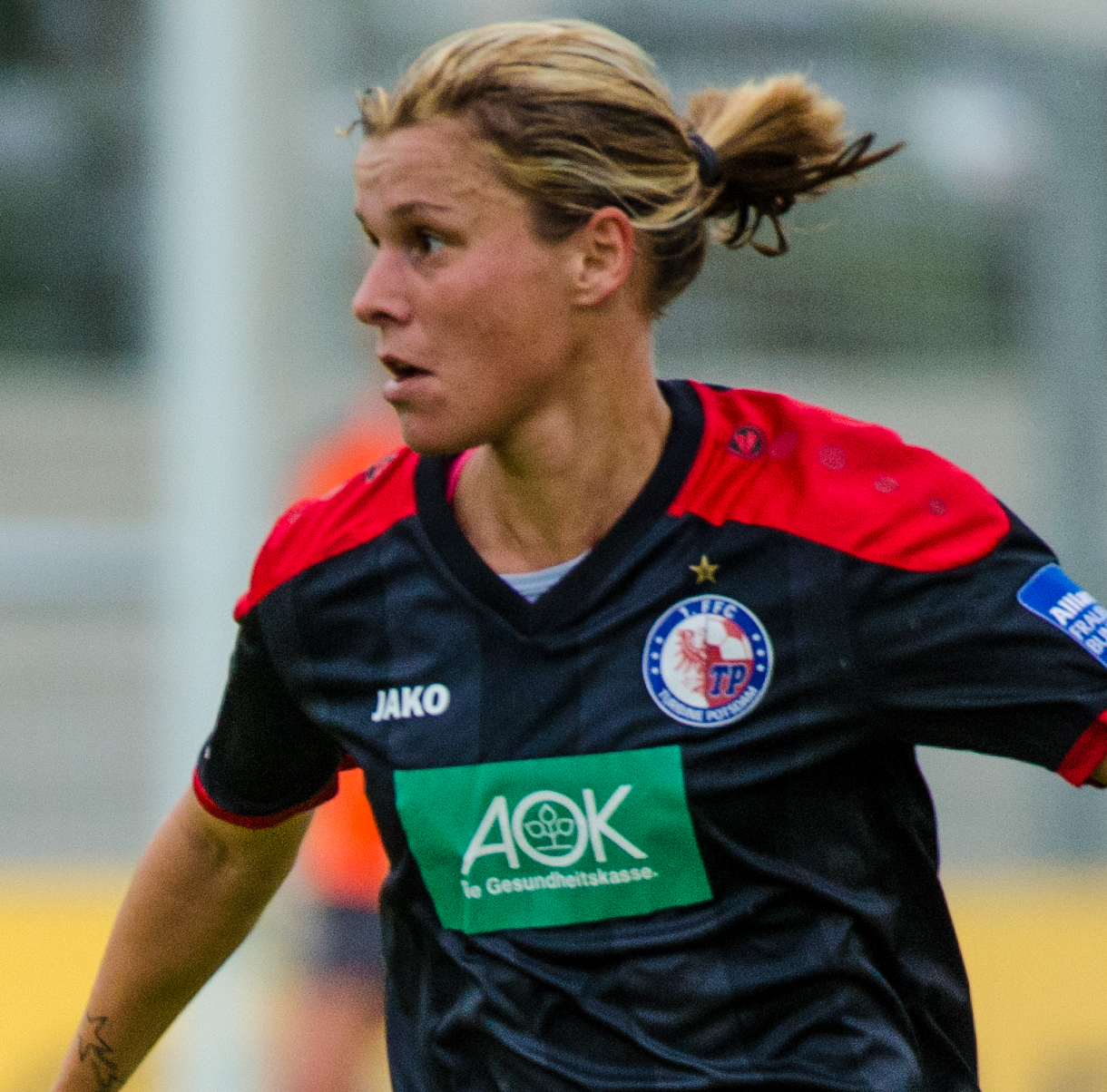
- Hanebeck playing for Turbine Potsdam in September 2015

Personal information
- Full name: Patricia Hanebeck
- Date of birth: 26 February 1986 (age 40)
- Place of birth: Siegburg, West Germany
- Position: Midfielder

Team information
- Current team: FF USV Jena
- Number: 30

Senior career*
Years	Team	Apps	(Gls)
2001–2003	SC Bad Neuenahr	19	(3)
2003–2008	FCR Duisburg	101	(38)
2008–2009	Hamburger SV	22	(10)
2009–2011	1. FC Köln	42	(10)
2011–2013	Turbine Potsdam	39	(8)
2013–2015	SC Sand	41	(9)
2015–2016	Turbine Potsdam	12	(3)
2016–	FF USV Jena	1	(0)
- * Club domestic league appearances and goals

Patricia Hanebeck is a German footballer currently playing for FF USV Jena in Germany's Frauen Bundesliga.

As an Under-19 international she won the 2004 U-19 World Championship.
