= Tanya Dennis =

Canadian soccer player (born 1985)

Personal information
- Date of birth: 26 August 1985 (age 41)
- Place of birth: Brampton, Ontario
- Height: 1.68 m (5 ft 6 in)
- Position: Defender

College career
Years	Team	Apps	(Gls)
2003–2006	Nebraska Cornhuskers	64	(4)

Senior career*
Years	Team	Apps	(Gls)
- Toronto Lady Lynx
- Ottawa Fury

International career^{‡}
2004	Canada U19	4	(1)
2003	Canada U23	3	(0)
2003-2007	Canada	18	(0)
- * Club domestic league appearances and goals ‡ National team caps and goals as of 10 September 2007 (before the 2007 FIFA Women's World Cup)

Tanya Dennis (born 26 August 1985) is a Canadian women's international soccer player who plays as a defender. She is a member of the Canada women's national soccer team. She was part of the team at the 2003 FIFA Women's World Cup and 2007 FIFA Women's World Cup. At the college level she played for Nebraska Cornhuskers in the United States. At the club level, she played for the Toronto Lady Lynx and Ottawa Fury.
