= Akudo Sabi =

Nigerian footballer

Personal information
- Date of birth: 17 November 1986 (age 39)
- Place of birth: Nigeria
- Position: Defender

Senior career*
Years	Team	Apps	(Gls)
- Bayelsa Queens
- Nigeria
- * Club domestic league appearances and goals

Akudo Sabi (born 17 November 1986) is a Nigerian football defender. She was part of the Nigeria women's national football team at the 2004 Summer Olympics. She was selected for the FIFA U-19 Women's World Championship All-Star Team in 2004. At the club level, she played for Bayelsa Queens.

== See also ==
- Nigeria at the 2004 Summer Olympics
