= Kim Yu-mi (footballer) =

South Korean footballer (born 1979)

Personal information
- Date of birth: 15 August 1979 (age 47)
- Position: Defender

Senior career*
Years	Team	Apps	(Gls)
- INI Steel

International career^{‡}
	South Korea	3	(0)
- * Club domestic league appearances and goals ‡ National team caps and goals as of 29 September 2003

Kim Yu-mi (born 15 August 1979) is a South Korean retired women's international footballer who played as a defender. She was a member of the South Korea women's national football team. She was part of the team at the 2003 FIFA Women's World Cup. On club level she played for INI Steel in South Korea.
