= Liu Sa =

Chinese footballer

Liu Sa (born July 11, 1987 in Beijing) is a Chinese football player who competed for the national team in the 2008 Summer Olympics. Her position is that of striker.

== International goals ==
No.	Date	Venue	Opponent	Score	Result	Competition
1.	30 May 2008	Thống Nhất Stadium, Hồ Chí Minh City, Vietnam	Thailand	1–0	5–1	2008 AFC Women's Asian Cup

== Major performances ==
- 2004 U19 World Cup - 2nd
- 2005 National Games - 1st
- 2007 World Cup - Quarterfinals
- 2008 Asian Cup - 2nd
