= Ayisat Yusuf =

Nigerian footballer

Personal information
- Full name: Ayisat Yusuf-Aromire
- Date of birth: 6 March 1985 (age 41)
- Place of birth: Nigeria
- Height: 1.62 m (5 ft 4 in)
- Position: Defender

Senior career*
Years	Team	Apps	(Gls)
–2007	Nasarawa Amazons		
2007	NiceFutis	–	(1)
2007–2010	Delta Queens FC		
2008	KMF	-	(0)
2010–2011	Rivers Angels SC		

International career
2002	Nigeria U-19		
2002–2009	Nigeria		
- * Club domestic league appearances and goals

Ayisat Yusuf-Aromire (born 6 March 1985) is a retired Nigerian female football player, who now lives in Finland.

Yusuf played for several clubs in Nigeria and Finland. She was a member of the Nigerian squad at the 2004 African Women's Championship, 2007 Women's World Cup and the 2008 Summer Olympics. After her retirement from active football, she moved to Finland where she works as a football coach and social advocate for immigrant women and girls through sports.

Yusuf lives in Kannelmäki, Helsinki. She married a Nigerian man. Both their children were born in Finland.

== Early life and career ==
Yusuf-Aromire was born in Lagos, Nigeria and began playing football at a young age. She earned her spot on the Nigeria U-19 national team that competed in the 2002 FIFA U-19 Women's World Cup in Canada. She later advanced to the senior team, representing Nigeria at the 2004 African Women's Championship, the 2007 FIFA Women's World Cup in China, and the 2008 Summer Olympics in Beijing.

=== Club career ===
In Nigeria, Yusuf-Aromire played for women's football clubs, including Nasarawa Amazons, Delta Queens, and Rivers Angels. Her performances earned her a place in Europe, where she played in Finland for clubs such as FC Oulu, NiceFutis, KMF Kuopio, and MimmiFutis. She also had a stint in Sweden before retiring from professional football in 2009.

=== Post-playing career ===
After retiring, Yusuf-Aromire settled in Helsinki, Finland, where she became involved in sports coaching and community work. She holds a UEFA B coaching license and has coached youth teams including FC Pohu’s boys’ teams and GPS United's girls’ teams. She also serves as a sports instructor for Monaliiku an NGO that promotes physical activity, integration, and empowerment among immigrant women.

In 2018, she founded the SheFootball Initiative, a non-profit organization in Nigeria that aims to empower girls through football, mentorship, education, and life skills. The initiative hosts annual conferences and tournaments that reach girls across Nigeria, promoting gender equality and personal development through sport.

She was named head coach of GirlPower United Afghans. The team would be competing in a 4-nation summer camp tournament at the FIFA headquarters in Zurich, Switzerland.

== Awards and Recorgnitions ==
In 2022, Yusuf-Aromire was awarded the FIFPRO Merit Award for her work in empowering women and girls through sport. She became the first African woman to receive the award. In 2025, she was selected to participate as a coach at a prestigious FIFA Summer Camp tournament in Zurich, representing GirlPower Afghans United among a cohort of international youth teams. Ayisat is a board member with Network FARE with UEFA.

== Sources ==
- UrheiluSuomi.com
