= Wuhan Sports Center =

Sports venue in Wuhan, China

Coordinates: 30°30′08″N 114°09′59″E

Wuhan Sports Center; 武汉体育中心
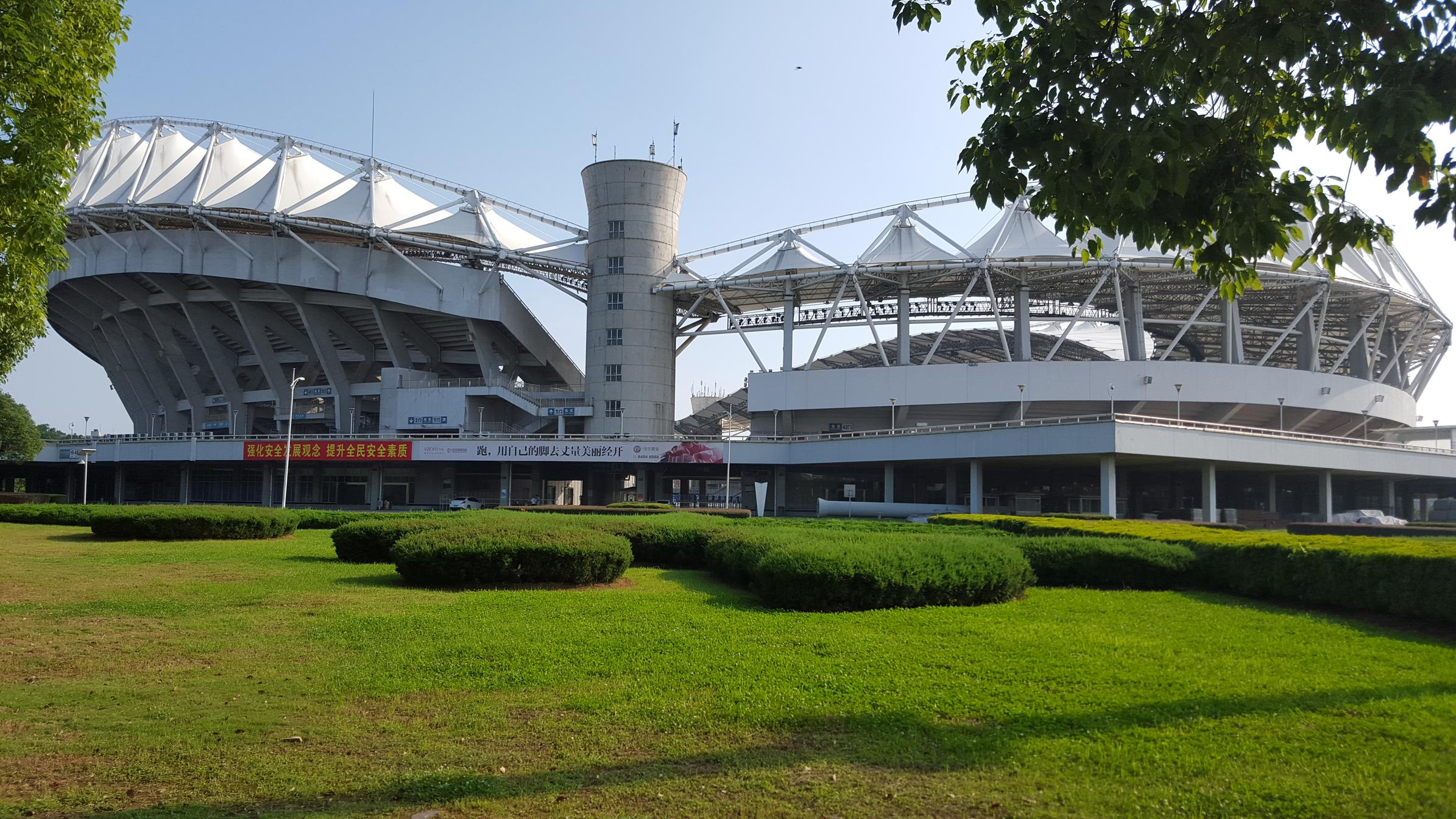
- Interactive map of: Wuhan Sports Center; 武汉体育中心
- Location: Wuhan, China
- Capacity: 54,000 (Stadium) 13,000 (Arena)
- Public transit: 3 6 at Dongfeng Motor Corporation; 3 at Sports Center

Construction
- Opened: 2002

Tenant
- Wuhan Three Towns

The Wuhan Sports Center (Chinese: 武汉体育中心) or Zhuankou Stadium (Chinese: 沌口体育场) is a sports complex with a multi-use stadium in Wuhan, China. Completed in 2002, it has an all-seated capacity of 54,000.

Local football team Wuhan Guanggu played some high attendance matches at the stadium. It was one of the venues for the 2007 FIFA Women's World Cup and the sole venue for the final stage of the 2015 EAFF East Asian Cup. Football club Wuhan Zall were tenants. They drew an average home attendance of 14,403 in their inaugural top division league season in 2013. Currently, it is the home of Wuhan Three Towns.

The stadium also hosted the 2015 Asian Athletics Championships.

At the height of COVID-19 pandemic in 2020, the stadium was one of the locations serving as Fangcang Hospital.

== 2007 FIFA Women's World Cup matches ==
Date	Stage	Team	Res.	Team	Att.
12 September 2007	Group D	New Zealand	0–5	Brazil	50,800
12 September 2007	Group D	China	3–2	Denmark	50,800
15 September 2007	Group D	Denmark	2–0	New Zealand	54,000
15 September 2007	Group D	Brazil	4–0	China	54,000
22 September 2007	Quarter-finals	Germany	3–0	North Korea	37,200
23 September 2007	Quarter-finals	Norway	1–0	China	52,000

== Notable events ==
- S.H.E - Perfect 3 World Tour - October 21, 2006
- G.E.M. - Queen of Hearts World Tour - 28 May 2017
- Joker Xue - I Think I've Seen You Somewhere Tour - 22 April 2017
