= Pu Wei =

Chinese footballer (born 1990)

Personal information
- Full name: Pu Wei
- Date of birth: 20 August 1980 (age 46)
- Place of birth: Shanghai, China
- Height: 1.72 m (5 ft 8 in)
- Position: Midfielder

Senior career*
Years	Team	Apps	(Gls)
1998–2001	Shanghai FC		
2002	Washington Freedom	20	(1)
2003–2008	Shanghai FC		
2011–2014	Shanghai FC		

International career
1998–2014	China	219	
Medal record
Women's football
Representing China
Asian Games
Silver medal – second place	2002 Busan	Team
Bronze medal – third place	2006 Doha	Team
FIFA Women's World Cup
Runner-up	1999 United States
- * Club domestic league appearances and goals

Pu Wei (simplified Chinese: 浦玮; traditional Chinese: 浦瑋; pinyin: Pǔ Wěi; born 20 August 1980) is a Chinese former footballer who played as a midfielder. A veteran of three FIFA Women's World Cup tournaments and three Olympics, Pu Wei competed in USA 1999, USA 2003, China 2007, Sydney 2000 Olympics, Athens 2004 Olympics, and Beijing 2008; as China did not qualify for Germany 2011 World Cup and London 2012 Olympics. Until 2013, Pu was the captain of China women's national football team. She retired after a friendly with North Korea on 15 February 2014.

== Olympics and World Cup ==
Pu Wei finished fifth with the Chinese team at Sydney 2000 Olympics, playing all three matches. Four years later she finished ninth with the Chinese team at Atlanta 2004 Olympics, playing two matches. At Beijing 2008 Olympics, USA 2003 and China 2007 World Cup tournaments, she reached the quarter-finals with her Chinese team. Her best performance, as a member of China women's national team, is reaching the final of USA 1999 women's world cup, losing in penalty-shoot-out.

Pu had a total of 219 caps for China, one of the most capped players in Chinese history. She was given a retirement ceremony by the Chinese Football Association, the first such honour given to a football player. She was awarded a ceremonial jersey numbered "219", signalling the number of appearances she had as a member of the national football team.

== International goals ==
No.	Date	Venue	Opponent	Score	Result	Competition
1.	30 June 1999	San Jose, United States	Russia	1–0	2–0	1999 FIFA Women's World Cup
2.	23 January 2002	Guangzhou, China	Germany	2–0	2–1	2002 Four Nations Tournament
3.	13 June 2003	Nakhon Sawan, Thailand	Uzbekistan	8–0	8–0	2003 AFC Women's Championship
4.	19 July 2006	Adelaide, Australia	Chinese Taipei	2–0	2–0	2006 AFC Women's Asian Cup
5.	20 November 2012	Shenzhen, China	Hong Kong	3–0	6–0	2013 EAFF Women's East Asian Cup

== See also ==
- List of women's footballers with 100 or more international caps
