= Gitte Andersen (footballer) =

Danish football defender (born 1977)

Personal information
- Full name: Gitte Andersen
- Date of birth: 28 April 1977 (age 49)
- Position: Centre back

Senior career*
Years	Team	Apps	(Gls)
- Ølstykke FC
- Rødovre BK
2001–2009	Brøndby IF	153	(4)

International career^{‡}
2000–2007	Denmark	79	(1)
- * Club domestic league appearances and goals ‡ National team caps and goals as of 10:41, 4 January 2014 (UTC)

Gitte Andersen (born 28 April 1977) is a Danish former football defender. She played for Brøndby IF and the Danish national team.

Andersen made 202 appearances for Brøndby between 2001 and 2009.
