= Bettina Falk =

Danish football defender (born 1981)

Personal information
- Full name: Bettina Falk Hansen
- Date of birth: March 31, 1981 (age 45)
- Position: Left back

Senior career*
Years	Team	Apps	(Gls)
–1998	Lillerød IF		
1999–2002	Hillerød GI		
2002–2003	FV København		
2003–2008	Brøndby IF	84	(7)

International career^{‡}
2003–2008	Denmark	56	(0)
- * Club domestic league appearances and goals ‡ National team caps and goals as of 10:25, 4 January 2014 (UTC)

Bettina Falk Hansen (born 31 March 1981) is a Danish former football defender. She played for Brøndby IF and the Danish women's national team. Falk quit international and club football at the age of 27 in June 2008, having made 116 appearances for Brøndby.
