= Stine Dimun =

Danish footballer (born 1979)

Personal information
- Full name: Stine Kjær Dimun
- Date of birth: 15 October 1979 (age 47)
- Height: 1.75 m (5 ft 9 in)
- Position: Midfielder

Senior career*
Years	Team	Apps	(Gls)
2003–2007	Brøndby IF	90	(49)

International career^{‡}
2003–2007	Denmark	30	(3)
- * Club domestic league appearances and goals ‡ National team caps and goals as of 18 December 2007

Stine Kjær Dimun (formerly Stine Kjær Jensen; born 15 October 1979) is a Danish former football midfielder. She played for Brøndby IF and the Danish national team.

Dimun made a total of 127 appearances for Brøndby between 2003, and 2007.
