= Sheree Gray =

American soccer player (born 1985)

Personal information
- Full name: Sheree Monique Gray
- Date of birth: December 12, 1985 (age 40)
- Place of birth: Toms River, New Jersey, U.S.
- Height: 5 ft 3 in (1.60 m)
- Position: Defender

Team information
- Current team: Sky Blue FC

College career
Years	Team	Apps	(Gls)
2005–2007	Penn State Nittany Lions	71	(4)

Senior career*
Years	Team	Apps	(Gls)
2003–2004	New Jersey Lady Stallions	8	(4)
2009	Saint Louis Athletica	5	(0)
2011–	Sky Blue FC		

International career^{‡}
- United States U-19
- United States U-21
- * Club domestic league appearances and goals as of 22:14, September 30, 2009 (UTC) ‡ National team caps and goals as of 22:14, September 30, 2009 (UTC)

Sheree Monique Gray (born December 12, 1985) is an American soccer defender who represents Sky Blue FC of Women's Professional Soccer.

She signed for Sky Blue in July 2011, having previously played for Saint Louis Athletica in the 2009 Women's Professional Soccer season.
