= Zhang Ying (footballer) =

Chinese footballer

Personal information
- Date of birth: 27 June 1985 (age 41)
- Place of birth: Shanghai, China
- Position: Defender

International career
Years	Team	Apps	(Gls)
2004	China	1	

Zhang Ying (simplified Chinese: 张颖; traditional Chinese: 張穎; pinyin: Zhāng Yǐng; born June 27, 1985) is a Chinese football player who competed in the 2004 Summer Olympics.

In 2004, she finished ninth with the Chinese team in the women's tournament. She played in one match.

== See also ==
- List of women's footballers with 100 or more international caps
