= 2002 FIFA U-19 Women's World Championship squads =

Football tournament squads

This article lists the team squads of the 2002 FIFA U-19 Women's World Championship, held in Canada from 17 August to 1 September 2002.

== Group A ==
=== Canada ===
No.	Pos.	Player	Date of birth (age)	Caps	Goals	Club
1	GK	Erin McLeod	26 February 1983 (aged 19)			(United States Soccer Federation) SMU Mustangs
2	DF	Heather Andrews	26 July 1983 (aged 19)			(Canadian Soccer Association) UBC Thunderbirds
3	MF	Carmelina Moscato	2 May 1983 (aged 19)			(Canadian Soccer Association) Ottawa Fury
4	DF	Sasha Andrews	14 February 1983 (aged 19)			(United States Soccer Federation) SMU Mustangs
5	DF	Robyn Gayle	31 October 1985 (aged 16)			(Canadian Soccer Association) Oakville Soccer Club
6	MF	Amy Vermeulen	23 November 1983 (aged 18)			(United States Soccer Federation) Wisconsin Badgers
7	DF	Myriam Gousse	23 August 1985 (aged 16)			(Canadian Soccer Association) Lakeshore Lakers
8	DF	Clare Rustad	27 May 1983 (aged 19)			(United States Soccer Federation) Washington Huskies
9	DF	Candace Chapman	2 April 1983 (aged 19)			(United States Soccer Federation) Notre Dame Fighting Irish
10	MF	Caroline Vaillancourt	2 February 1985 (aged 17)			(Canadian Soccer Association) Dynamo de Québec
11	FW	Michelle Rowe	17 May 1984 (aged 18)			(Canadian Soccer Association) Calgary Blizzard SC
12	FW	Christine Sinclair (captain)	12 June 1983 (aged 19)			(United States Soccer Federation) Portland Pilots
13	DF	Melanie Booth	24 August 1984 (aged 17)			(Canadian Soccer Association) Burlington Flames
14	DF	Christina Kahlina	29 March 1983 (aged 19)			(Canadian Soccer Association) Alberta Pandas
15	FW	Kara Lang	22 October 1986 (aged 15)			(Canadian Soccer Association) Oakville Soccer Club
16	FW	Katie Thorlakson	14 January 1985 (aged 17)			(United States Soccer Federation) Notre Dame Fighting Irish
17	MF	Brittany Timko	5 September 1985 (aged 16)			(Canadian Soccer Association) Burnaby Panthers
18	GK	Jessica Hussey	2 August 1983 (aged 19)			(Canadian Soccer Association) Ottawa Fury

=== Denmark ===
#	Name	Club	Date of Birth (Age)	Pld	Goal	Booked	(yellow card) (yellow-red card)	Sent off (straight red)
Goalkeepers
1	Susanne Graversen	(Denmark) Fortuna Hjørring	8 November 1984 (aged 17)	1	0	0	0	0
18	Sarah Andersen	(Denmark) Vojens	13 August 1983 (aged 19)	3	0	0	0	0
Defenders
2	Louise Pedersen	(Denmark) Vejle B	26 February 1984 (aged 18)	3	0	0	0	0
3	Ellen Larsen	(Denmark) Viborg	23 June 1983 (aged 19)	3	0	0	0	0
4	Kristina Boldt	(United States) Louisiana–Lafayette Ragin' Cajuns	5 September 1983 (aged 18)	4	0	0	0	0
5	Camilla Mogensen	(Denmark) Odense BK	3 September 1983 (aged 18)	2	0	0	0	0
6	Trin Boman Jensen	(Denmark) B1921	29 January 1984 (aged 18)	2	0	0	0	0
14	Malene Marquard	(Denmark) Brøndby	2 February 1983 (aged 19)	4	0	0	0	0
Midfielders
7	Ditte Larsen (c)	(Denmark) Brøndby	24 April 1983 (aged 19)	4	0	0	0	0
8	Mariann Gajhede Knudsen	(Denmark) Fortuna Hjørring	16 November 1984 (aged 17)	4	0	0	0	0
10	Cecilie Pedersen	(Denmark) Brøndby	19 March 1983 (aged 19)	4	0	0	0	0
13	Johanna Rasmussen	(Denmark) B1921	2 July 1983 (aged 19)	4	0	0	0	0
15	Maria Juuljensen	(Denmark) Odense BK	4 February 1984 (aged 18)	3	0	0	0	0
16	Pernille Jorgensen	(Denmark) Thisted FC	14 July 1984 (aged 18)	3	0	0	0	0
Forwards
9	Sandra Jensen	(Denmark) Varde	19 November 1985 (aged 16)	4	0	0	0	0
11	Dorte Petersen	(Denmark) B1921	22 February 1983 (aged 19)	3	0	0	0	0
12	Cecilie Frandsen	(Denmark) Brøndby	10 November 1984 (aged 17)	1	0	0	0	0
17	Marie Herping	(Denmark) Odense BK	18 March 1984 (aged 18)	3	0	0	0	0
Coach
	(Denmark) Per Rud

=== Japan ===
#	Name	Club	Date of Birth (Age)	Pld	Goal	Booked	(yellow card) (yellow-red card)	Sent off (straight red)
Goalkeepers
1	Tomomi Akiyama	(Japan) Tasaki Perule	19 February 1983 (aged 19)	1	0	0	0	0
18	Miho Fukumoto	(Japan) Okayama Yunogo Belle	2 October 1983 (aged 18)	4	0	0	0	0
21	Miku Matsubayashi	(Japan) Nichidai Tsurugaoka	27 May 1984 (aged 18)	0	0	0	0	0
Defenders
3	Reiko Tatsumi	(Japan) Kamimura Gakuen	29 June 1984 (aged 18)	0	0	0	0	0
4	Yuka Miyazaki (C)	(Japan) Kunoichi	13 October 1983 (aged 18)	4	0	0	0	0
12	Eri Momotake	(Japan) Kanagawa University	2 July 1983 (aged 19)	0	0	0	0	0
14	Akiko Niwata	(Japan) Speranza	12 September 1984 (aged 17)	0	0	0	0	0
15	Ai Sato	(Japan) Tokiwagi Gakuen	10 April 1984 (aged 18)	0	0	0	0	0
16	Sayaka Yamazaki	(Japan) Kodaira	22 January 1985 (aged 17)	0	0	0	0	0
17	Kaori Kasai	(Japan) Utsunomiya	28 July 1985 (aged 17)	0	0	0	0	0
Midfielders
2	Maiko Nasu	(Japan) Kunoichi	31 July 1984 (aged 18)	0	0	0	0	0
5	Kana Watanabe	(Japan) Seiwa Gakuen	28 July 1984 (aged 18)	0	0	0	0	0
6	Yu Hayasaka	(Japan) Tasaki Perule	15 February 1984 (aged 18)	0	0	0	0	0
7	Akiko Sudo	(Japan) Beleza	7 April 1984 (aged 18)	0	0	0	0	0
Forwards
8	Yukari Kinga	(Japan) Shonan Gakuen	2 May 1984 (aged 18)	0	0	0	0	0
9	Shinobu Ohno	(Japan) Beleza	23 January 1984 (aged 18)	4	3	0	0	0
10	Kanako Ito	(Japan) Beleza	20 July 1983 (aged 19)	0	0	0	0	0
11	Ayako Kitamoto	(Japan) Tokyo Women's College of PE	22 June 1983 (aged 19)	0	0	0	0	0
13	Karina Maruyama	(Japan) Nippon Sport Science University	26 March 1983 (aged 19)	0	0	0	0	0
19	Chihiro Watanabe	(Japan) Tasaki Perule	11 December 1983 (aged 18)	0	0	0	0	0
Coach
	(Japan) Shinobu Ikeda

=== Nigeria ===
#	Name	Club	Date of Birth (Age)	Pld	Goal	Booked	(yellow card) (yellow-red card)	Sent off (straight red)
Goalkeepers
1	Francisca Agbara	(Nigeria) Police Machine	4 June 1986 (aged 16)	3	0	0	0	0
18	Elizabeth Johnson	(Nigeria) Delta Queens	17 September 1984 (aged 17)	0	0	0	0	0
Defenders
2	Adeola Aminu	(Nigeria) Delta Queens	6 August 1986 (aged 16)	3	0	0	0	0
3	Ayisat Yusuf	(Nigeria) Capital Queens	6 March 1985 (aged 17)	3	0	0	0	0
4	Omon Ighodaro	(Nigeria) FCT Queens	1 March 1986 (aged 16)	2	0	0	0	0
5	Akudo Sabi	(Nigeria) Delta Queens	17 November 1986 (aged 15)	3	0	0	0	0
6	Lilian Cole	(Nigeria) Inneh Queens	1 August 1985 (aged 17)	3	0	0	0	0
Midfielders
7	Maranda Odigilia	(Nigeria) FCT Queens	10 May 1986 (aged 16)	2	0	0	0	0
8	Edith Eduviere	(Nigeria) Inneh Queens	18 August 1986 (aged 15)	2	0	0	0	0
9	Titilayo Mekuleyi	(Nigeria) Capital Queens	14 July 1986 (aged 16)	3	0	0	0	0
13	Victoria Nweze	(Nigeria) Delta Queens	6 June 1985 (aged 17)	2	0	0	0	0
14	Thessy Nkereuwem	(Nigeria) Delta Queens	10 October 1983 (aged 18)	1	0	0	0	0
16	Akudo Iwuagwu	(Nigeria) Delta Queens	13 October 1986 (aged 15)	2	1	0	0	0
Forwards
10	Ifeoma Obidigwe	(Nigeria) Delta Queens	20 November 1984 (aged 17)	2	0	0	0	0
11	Olushola Oyewusi	(Nigeria) Inneh Queens	30 March 1985 (aged 17)	3	1	0	0	0
12	Cynthia Uwak	(Nigeria) Sunshine Queens	15 July 1986 (aged 16)	1	0	0	0	0
15	Nkese Udoh	(Nigeria) Inneh Queens	10 September 1986 (aged 15)	2	0	0	0	0
17	Ifeanyi Chiejine (c)	(Nigeria) FCT Queens	17 May 1983 (aged 19)	3	0	0	0	0
Coach
	(Nigeria) Effiom Ntiero

== Group B ==
=== Brazil ===
#	Name	Club	Date of Birth (Age)	Pld	Goal	Booked	(yellow card) (yellow-red card)	Sent off (straight red)
Goalkeepers
1	Giselle	(Brazil) Juventus	20 November 1983 (aged 18)	6	0	0	0	0
18	Fernanda	(Brazil) Internacional	11 February 1984 (aged 18)	0	0	0	0	0
Defenders
2	Janaina	(Brazil) Novo Mundo	4 September 1984 (aged 17)	3	0	0	0	0
3	Angélica	(Brazil) Guarani	22 December 1984 (aged 17)	1	0	0	0	0
4	Bagé	(Brazil) Grêmio	15 April 1983 (aged 19)	3	0	0	0	0
6	Lidiane	(Brazil) Grêmio	18 December 1984 (aged 17)	1	0	0	0	0
14	Renata Diniz	(Brazil) Juventus	1 November 1985 (aged 16)	6	0	1	0	0
15	Michele	(Brazil) Palmeiras	10 June 1984 (aged 18)	6	0	0	0	0
Midfielders
5	Daniela (C)	No club affiliation	12 January 1984 (aged 18)	5	3	2	0	0
7	Ariana	(Brazil) Palmeiras	28 November 1983 (aged 18)	6	0	1	0	0
8	Renata Costa	(Brazil) Maringá	8 July 1986 (aged 16)	6	1	0	0	0
10	Marta	(Brazil) Vasco da Gama	19 February 1986 (aged 16)	6	6	0	0	0
16	Ludimila	(Brazil) Diamantino	6 April 1983 (aged 19)	4	0	1	0	0
Forwards
9	Kelly	(Brazil) Vasco da Gama	8 May 1985 (aged 17)	6	3	0	0	0
11	Cristiane	(Brazil) Juventus	15 May 1985 (aged 17)	6	2	0	0	0
12	Fernanda Hemann	(Brazil) GRESFI	20 January 1983 (aged 19)	3	0	1	0	0
13	Tatiana	(Brazil) Comercial	18 March 1985 (aged 17)	5	1	1	0	0
17	Maurine	(Brazil) Grêmio	14 January 1986 (aged 16)	2	0	0	0	0
Coach
	(Brazil) Paulo Gonçalves

=== France ===
Head coach: Bruno Bini

No.	Pos.	Player	Date of birth (age)	Caps	Goals	Club
1	GK	Bérangère Sapowicz	6 February 1983 (aged 19)			(French Football Federation) Évreux
2	MF	Anne-Laure Casseleux	13 January 1984 (aged 18)			(French Football Federation) CNFE
3	DF	Laura Georges	20 August 1984 (aged 17)			(French Football Federation) CNFE
4	MF	Zoe Avner	18 July 1983 (aged 19)			(French Football Federation) FCF Juvisy
5	DF	Adeline Boyer	1 April 1984 (aged 18)			(French Football Federation) Toulouse
6	MF	Camille Abily	5 December 1984 (aged 17)			(French Football Federation) CNFE
7	FW	Élodie Ramos	13 March 1983 (aged 19)			(French Football Federation) Montpellier
8	DF	Ophélie Meilleroux	18 January 1984 (aged 18)			(French Football Federation) CNFE
9	FW	Sandrine Rouquet	13 May 1983 (aged 19)			(French Football Federation) Toulouse
10	FW	Lilas Traïkia	6 August 1985 (aged 17)			(French Football Federation) Toulouse
11	MF	Ludivine Diguelman	15 April 1984 (aged 18)			(French Football Federation) CNFE
12	MF	Amélie Coquet	31 December 1984 (aged 17)			(French Football Federation) Henin-Beaumont
13	DF	Marie Claude Herlem	12 March 1984 (aged 18)			(French Football Federation) CNFE
14	FW	Claire Morel	14 February 1984 (aged 18)			(French Football Federation) CNFE
15	DF	Faustine Roux	24 March 1984 (aged 18)			(French Football Federation) CNFE
16	MF	Corine Petit	5 October 1983 (aged 18)			(French Football Federation) ASJ Soyaux
17	DF	Sandrine Dusang	23 March 1984 (aged 18)			(French Football Federation) CNFE
18	GK	Geraldine Marty	3 May 1983 (aged 19)			(French Football Federation) Toulouse

=== Germany ===
Head coach: Silvia Neid & Tina Theune

No.	Pos.	Player	Date of birth (age)	Caps	Goals	Club
1	GK	Miriam Elling	18 August 1984 (aged 17)			(German Football Association) FFC Heike Rheine
2	DF	Alexandra Stegmann	17 October 1983 (aged 18)			(German Football Association) SC Freiburg
3	MF	Linda Bresonik	7 December 1983 (aged 18)			(German Football Association) FCR Duisburg
4	DF	Susanne Kasperczyk	1 August 1985 (aged 17)			(German Football Association) Teutonia Weiden
5	DF	Sarah Günther	25 January 1983 (aged 19)			(German Football Association) ATS Buntentor
6	MF	Viola Odebrecht	11 February 1983 (aged 19)			(German Football Association) Turbine Potsdam
7	MF	Annelie Brendel	24 September 1983 (aged 18)			(German Football Association) Turbine Potsdam
8	MF	Anne-Kathrin Sabel	30 June 1983 (aged 19)			(German Football Association) FSV Frankfurt
9	FW	Anja Mittag	16 May 1985 (aged 17)			(German Football Association) Turbine Potsdam
10	FW	Barbara Müller	3 March 1983 (aged 19)			(German Football Association) FSC Mönchengladbach
11	MF	Isabell Bachor	10 July 1983 (aged 19)			(German Football Association) FSV Frankfurt
12	DF	Jennifer Zietz	14 September 1983 (aged 18)			(German Football Association) Turbine Potsdam
13	MF	Kerstin Boschert	20 August 1983 (aged 18)			(German Football Association) SC Freiburg
14	MF	Andrea Richter	8 May 1984 (aged 18)			(German Football Association) Hastenbeck
15	DF	Christina Krueger	29 November 1984 (aged 17)			(German Football Association) FSV Gütersloh 2009
16	FW	Patrczia Barucha	7 April 1983 (aged 19)			(German Football Association) FFC Frankfurt
17	MF	Karolin Thomas	3 April 1985 (aged 17)			(German Football Association) Tennis Borussia Berlin
18	GK	Nadine Richter	24 July 1984 (aged 18)			(German Football Association) FFC Heike Rheine

=== Mexico ===
Head coach: Leonardo Cuéllar

No.	Pos.	Player	Date of birth (age)	Caps	Goals	Club
1	GK	Anjulí Ladrón de Guevara	7 October 1986 (aged 15)			(Mexican Football Federation) Jalisco
2	DF	Carina Maravillas	22 June 1983 (aged 19)			(Mexican Football Federation) Palomas
3	DF	Michell Rico	30 March 1983 (aged 19)			(Mexican Football Federation) Laguna
4	DF	Jessica Romero	16 November 1984 (aged 17)			(Mexican Football Federation) Bonita Rebel
5	DF	María de Jesús Castillo	6 July 1983 (aged 19)			(Mexican Football Federation) Palomas
6	DF	Janeth Siordia	21 October 1984 (aged 17)			(Mexican Football Federation) Coritas
7	MF	Dioselina Valderrama	28 April 1984 (aged 18)			(Mexican Football Federation) Bonita Rebel
8	MF	Mónica Vergara	2 May 1983 (aged 19)			(Mexican Football Federation) Andreas Soccer
9	FW	Guadalupe Worbis	12 December 1983 (aged 18)			(Mexican Football Federation) Rogers
10	MF	Yanet Antunez	22 August 1984 (aged 17)			(United States Soccer Federation) Southern California Blues
11	DF	Luz Saucedo	14 December 1983 (aged 18)			(Mexican Football Federation) Copa Dusa
12	DF	Marlene Sandoval	18 January 1984 (aged 18)			(United States Soccer Federation) Infinity
13	DF	Nancy Perez	18 March 1984 (aged 18)			(Mexican Football Federation) Copa Dusa
14	MF	Sulim Quinarez	18 March 1984 (aged 18)			(Mexican Football Federation) Jalisco
15	FW	Lisette Martinez	6 July 1984 (aged 18)			(Mexican Football Federation) Bonita Rebel
16	FW	Carmenita Padilla	2 May 1985 (aged 17)			(United States Soccer Federation) Juventus Exiles
17	FW	Jessica Padron	3 January 1984 (aged 18)			(Mexican Football Federation) Guadalajara
18	GK	Pamela Tajonar	2 December 1984 (aged 17)			(Mexican Football Federation) Alianza

== Group C ==
=== Australia ===
Head coach: Mike Mulvey

No.	Pos.	Player	Date of birth (age)	Caps	Goals	Club
1	GK	Lisa Hartley	6 October 1984 (aged 17)			(Football Australia) Canberra Eclipse
2	DF	Kate McShea	13 April 1983 (aged 19)			(Football Australia) Queensland Sting
3	DF	Thea Slatyer	2 February 1983 (aged 19)			(Football Australia) NSW Sapphires
4	MF	Emma Davison	4 May 1985 (aged 17)			(Football Australia) NSW Sapphires
5	DF	Karla Reuter	14 June 1984 (aged 18)			(Football Australia) Queensland Sting
6	MF	Stacey Stocco	3 April 1984 (aged 18)			(Football Australia) Adelaide Sensation
7	MF	Lana Harch	23 November 1984 (aged 17)			(Football Australia) Queensland Sting
8	FW	Amber Neilson	14 December 1984 (aged 17)			(Football Australia) Northern NSW Pride
9	FW	Kate Gill	10 December 1984 (aged 17)			(Football Australia) Northern NSW Pride
10	MF	Caitlin Munoz	4 October 1983 (aged 18)			(Football Australia) Canberra Eclipse
11	MF	Elissia Canham	29 April 1985 (aged 17)			(Football Australia) Queensland Sting
12	DF	Rose Dunne	2 September 1983 (aged 18)			(Football Australia) Northern NSW Pride
13	MF	Catherine Cannuli	3 March 1986 (aged 16)			(Football Australia) NSW Sapphires
14	FW	Hayley Crawford	27 March 1984 (aged 18)			(Football Australia) Northern NSW Pride
15	FW	Selin Kuralay	25 January 1985 (aged 17)			(Football Australia) Victoria Vision
16	DF	Lorissa Stevens	8 April 1985 (aged 17)			(Football Australia) Northern NSW Pride
17	FW	Jessica Mitchell	29 May 1983 (aged 19)			(Football Australia) Queensland Sting
18	GK	Luisa Marzotto	17 March 1984 (aged 18)			(Football Australia) Canberra Eclipse

=== England ===
#	Name	Club	Date of Birth (Age)	Pld	Goal	Booked	(yellow card) (yellow-red card)	Sent off (straight red)
Goalkeepers
1	Toni-Anne Wayne	(England) Southampton	8 May 1983 (aged 19)	0	0	0	0	0
18	Rachelle Houldsworth	(England) Sheffield Wednesday	18 June 1984 (aged 18)	0	0	0	0	0
Defenders
2	Leanne Champ	(England) Arsenal	10 August 1983 (aged 19)	0	0	0	0	0
3	Corinne Yorston	(England) Southampton	15 June 1983 (aged 19)	0	0	0	0	0
5	Jess Wright (C)	(England) Berkhamsted Town	11 September 1983 (aged 18)	0	0	0	0	0
6	Laura Bassett	(England) Birmingham City	2 August 1983 (aged 19)	0	0	0	0	0
15	Shelly Cox	(England) Southampton	16 May 1984 (aged 18)	0	0	0	0	0
Midfielders
4	Fara Williams	(England) Charlton Athletic	25 January 1984 (aged 18)	0	0	0	0	0
8	Kelly McDougall	(England) Everton	22 January 1984 (aged 18)	0	0	0	0	0
11	Michelle Hickmott	(England) Birmingham City	20 February 1985 (aged 17)	0	0	0	0	0
12	Emily Westwood	(England) Wolverhampton Wanderers	5 April 1984 (aged 18)	0	0	0	0	0
13	Anita Asante	(England) Arsenal	27 April 1985 (aged 17)	0	0	0	0	0
17	Sheuneen Ta	(England) Arsenal	21 July 1985 (aged 17)	0	0	0	0	0
Forwards
7	Alex Scott	(England) Arsenal	14 October 1984 (aged 17)	0	0	0	0	0
9	Katy Ward	(England) Birmingham City	5 January 1984 (aged 18)	0	0	0	0	0
10	Ellen Maggs	(England) Arsenal	16 February 1983 (aged 19)	0	0	0	0	0
14	Faye Dunn	(England) Tranmere Rovers	8 October 1983 (aged 18)	0	0	0	0	0
16	Kim Holden	(England) Tranmere Rovers	27 September 1985 (aged 16)	0	0	0	0	0
Coach
	(England) Mo Marley

=== Chinese Taipei ===
#	Name	Club	Date of Birth (Age)	Pld	Goal	Booked	(yellow card) (yellow-red card)	Sent off (straight red)
Goalkeepers
1	Huang Feng-chiu	No club affiliation	20 September 1983 (aged 18)	3	0	0	0	0
18	Chen Hui-shan	No club affiliation	18 March 1985 (aged 17)	0	0	0	0	0
Defenders
2	Yu Pei-wen (c)	No club affiliation	1 June 1983 (aged 19)	3	0	0	0	0
3	Pan Pei-chen	No club affiliation	10 March 1983 (aged 19)	3	0	0	0	0
4	Lee Hsueh-hua	No club affiliation	17 January 1984 (aged 18)	2	0	0	0	0
5	Wu Shin-jung	No club affiliation	4 July 1985 (aged 17)	2	0	0	0	0
10	Hsu Chi-ling	No club affiliation	21 January 1984 (aged 18)	0	0	0	0	0
15	Lin Ya-shu	No club affiliation	24 December 1984 (aged 17)	0	0	0	0	0
16	Wang Yu-ting	No club affiliation	9 February 1985 (aged 17)	3	0	0	0	0
Midfielders
6	Chang Hui-chih	No club affiliation	18 April 1983 (aged 19)	3	0	0	0	0
8	Lan Mei-fen	No club affiliation	25 September 1983 (aged 18)	3	0	0	0	0
11	Lu Yen-ling	No club affiliation	15 January 1985 (aged 17)	3	1	0	0	0
13	Tsai Li-chen	No club affiliation	14 October 1983 (aged 18)	2	0	0	0	0
14	Lin Chia-feng	No club affiliation	17 October 1983 (aged 18)	3	0	0	0	0
17	Lu Hui-mei	No club affiliation	27 September 1984 (aged 17)	3	0	0	0	0
Forwards
7	Cheng Yu-hsing	No club affiliation	27 July 1983 (aged 19)	2	0	1	1	0
9	Tseng Shu-o	No club affiliation	6 September 1984 (aged 17)	3	0	0	0	0
12	Tsai Hsin-yun	No club affiliation	24 June 1984 (aged 18)	1	0	0	0	0
Coach
	(Chinese Taipei) Yao Chuan-chang

=== United States ===
#	Name	Club	Date of Birth (Age)	Pld	Goal	Booked	(yellow card) (yellow-red card)	Sent off (straight red)
Goalkeepers
1	Megan Rivera	(United States) Auburn Tigers	7 February 1983 (aged 19)	0	0	0	0	0
18	Ashlyn Harris	(United States) North Carolina Tar Heels	19 October 1985 (aged 16)	0	0	0	0	0
Defenders
2	Rachel Buehler	(United States) Stanford Cardinal	26 August 1985 (aged 16)	0	0	0	0	0
3	Jessica Ballweg	(United States) Santa Clara Broncos	10 March 1983 (aged 19)	0	0	0	0	0
6	Amy Steadman	(United States) North Carolina Tar Heels	8 September 1984 (aged 17)	0	0	0	0	0
8	Kendall Fletcher	(United States) North Carolina Tar Heels	6 November 1984 (aged 17)	0	0	0	0	0
10	Leslie Osborne	(United States) Santa Clara Broncos	27 May 1983 (aged 19)	0	0	0	0	0
11	Keeley Dowling	(United States) Tennessee Lady Volunteers	17 February 1983 (aged 19)	0	0	0	0	0
19	Stephanie Ebner	(United States) Arizona State Sun Devils	5 February 1984 (aged 18)	0	0	0	0	0
Midfielders
4	Jill Oakes	(United States) UCLA Bruins	18 July 1984 (aged 18)	0	0	0	0	0
7	Lori Chalupny	(United States) North Carolina Tar Heels	29 January 1984 (aged 18)	0	0	0	0	0
13	Manya Makoski	(United States) Arizona State Sun Devils	18 April 1984 (aged 18)	0	0	0	0	0
14	Sarah Huffman	(United States) Virginia Cavaliers	5 March 1984 (aged 18)	0	0	0	0	0
Forwards
5	Kerri Hanks	(United States) Notre Dame Fighting Irish	2 September 1985 (aged 16)	0	0	0	0	0
9	Heather O'Reilly	(United States) North Carolina Tar Heels	2 January 1985 (aged 17)	0	0	0	0	0
12	Angela Woznuk	(United States) Portland Pilots	29 March 1985 (aged 17)	0	0	0	0	0
15	Lindsay Tarpley (C)	(United States) North Carolina Tar Heels	22 September 1983 (aged 18)	0	0	0	0	0
16	Kelly Wilson	(United States) Texas Longhorns	19 February 1983 (aged 19)	0	0	0	0	0
17	Megan Kakadelas	(United States) Santa Clara Broncos	26 July 1983 (aged 19)	0	0	0	0	0
Coach
	(United States) Tracey Leone
