= 2002 UEFA Women's Under-19 Championship =

Tournament details
- Host country: Sweden
- Dates: 2–12 May
- Teams: 8
- Venue: 7 (in 7 host cities)

Final positions
- Champions: Germany (3rd title)
- Runners-up: France

Tournament statistics
- Top scorer(s): (France) Claire Morel (Germany) Barbara Müller (4 goals each)

The UEFA Women's U-19 Championship 2002 Final Tournament was held in Sweden between 2 and 12 May 2002. Players born after 1 January 1983 were eligible to participate in this competition.

== Group stage ==
Key to colours in group tables
Group winners and runners-up advanced to the semi-finals

=== Group A ===
Team	Pld	W	D	L	GF	GA	GD	Pts
Germany	3	3	0	0	6	2	+4	9
France	3	1	1	1	4	4	0	4
Spain	3	1	0	2	2	4	−2	3
Sweden	3	0	1	2	0	2	−2	1

2 May 2002

France	2–3	Germany
Morel 36', 41'		B. Müller 21', 56', 71'

Olympia, Helsingborg
2 May 2002

Sweden	0–1	Spain
		Vázquez 90'

Olympia, Helsingborg

4 May 2002

Spain	0–2	Germany
		Brendel 16'; Odebrecht 89'

Staffansvallen, Staffanstorp
4 May 2002

Sweden	0–0	France

Staffansvallen, Staffanstorp

6 May 2002

Germany	1–0	Sweden
Mittag 20'

Ängelholms IP, Ängelholm
6 May 2002

Spain	1–2	France
Saray 80'		Ramos 40'; Morel 68'

Högalids IP, Kävlinge

=== Group B ===
Team	Pld	W	D	L	GF	GA	GD	Pts
Denmark	3	3	0	0	8	2	+6	9
England	3	1	0	2	7	7	0	3
Switzerland	3	1	0	2	5	8	−3	3
Norway	3	1	0	2	4	7	−3	3

3 May 2002

Norway	1–3	England
Kopke da Fonseca 38'		Hickmott 4'; Cox 52'; McDougall 63'

Julivallen, Höganäs
3 May 2002

Switzerland	0–3	Denmark
		Stentoft 19', 75'; Knudsen 67'

Julivallen, Höganäs

5 May 2002

Norway	2–1	Switzerland
Nilsen 9'; Lyngroth 21'		Theiler 86'

Örebäcksvallen, Båstad
5 May 2002

England	1–2	Denmark
Dunn 68'		Rasmussen 57'; Petersen 31'

Örebäcksvallen, Båstad

7 May 2002

Denmark	3–1	Norway
Rasmussen 8'; Larsen 43'; Pedersen 83' (pen.)		Nilsen 37'

Ängelholms IP, Ängelholm
7 May 2002

England	3–4	Switzerland
Dunn 7'; Ward 13', 38'		Gassmann 21', 89'; Theiler 26', 61' (pen.)

Högalids IP, Kävlinge

=== Bracket ===
Semi-finals
10 May – Landskrona IP
Germany	1
England	0
10 May – Landskrona IP
Denmark	0
France	1

Final
12 May – Landskrona IP
Germany	3
France	1

=== Semifinals ===
10 May 2002

Germany	1–0	England
Sabel 29' (pen.)

Landskrona IP, Landskrona

10 May 2002

Denmark	0–1	France
		Morel 35'

Landskrona IP, Landskrona

=== Final ===
12 May 2002

Germany	3–1	France
Bachor 34'; Müller 43'; Odebrecht 70'		Rouquet 11'

Olympia, Helsingborg

== Sources ==
- Swedish FA
