= 2002 FIFA U-19 Women's World Championship =

FIFA U-19 Women's World Championship Canada 2002 Coupe du Monde de Football Féminin des Moins de 19 ans 2002

Tournament details
- Host country: Canada
- Dates: 17 August – 1 September
- Teams: 12 (from 6 confederations)
- Venues: 3 (in 3 host cities)

Final positions
- Champions: United States (1st title)
- Runners-up: Canada
- Third place: Germany
- Fourth place: Brazil

Tournament statistics
- Matches played: 26
- Goals scored: 101 (3.88 per match)
- Attendance: 295,133 (11,351 per match)
- Top scorer(s): (Canada) Christine Sinclair (10 goals)
- Best player: (Canada) Christine Sinclair
- Fair play award: Japan

The 2002 FIFA U-19 Women's World Championship was held from 17 August to 1 September. It was the first sanctioned youth tournament for women put together by FIFA. The tournament was hosted by Canada. FIFA granted the tournament to Canada in March 2001. Three cities hosted the tournament, Edmonton, Vancouver, and Victoria.

== Qualified teams ==
Confederation (Continent)	Qualifying Tournament	Qualifier(s)
AFC (Asia)	2002 AFC U-19 Women's Championship	Japan; Chinese Taipei
CAF (Africa)	2002 African U-19 Women's Championship	Nigeria
CONCACAF (North, Central America & Caribbean)	Host nation	Canada
CONCACAF (North, Central America & Caribbean)	2002 CONCACAF U-19 Women's Qualifying Tournament	United States; Mexico
CONMEBOL (South America)	2002 CONMEBOL Under-19 Play-Off	Brazil
OFC (Oceania)	2002 OFC Women's Under 19 Qualifying Tournament	Australia
UEFA (Europe)	2002 UEFA Women's Under-19 Championship	Germany; France; Denmark; England

== Venues ==
Burnaby	Edmonton	Victoria
Swangard Stadium	Commonwealth Stadium	Centennial Stadium
Capacity: 10,000	Capacity: 60,081	Capacity: 5,000
2002 FIFA U-19 Women's World Championship is located in Canada

== Group stage ==
=== Group A ===
Team	Pts	Pld	W	D	L	GF	GA	GD
Canada	9	3	3	0	0	9	2	+7
Japan	4	3	1	1	1	3	6	−3
Denmark	3	3	1	0	2	5	6	−1
Nigeria	1	3	0	1	2	2	5	−3

18 August 2002
16:00

Canada	3–2	Denmark
Sinclair 15'; Rowe 68'; Lang 80'	(Report)	Rasmussen 51'; Stentoft-Herping 53'

Commonwealth Stadium, Edmonton
Attendance: 25,000
Referee: Szokolai

18 August 2002
18:15

Nigeria	1–1	Japan
Iwuagwu 36'	(Report)	Sudo 26'

Commonwealth Stadium
Attendance: 10,000
Referee: Ferreira-James

20 August 2002
17:45

Denmark	2–1	Nigeria
Rasmussen 28', 47'	(Report)	Oyewusi 76'

Commonwealth Stadium
Attendance: 7,000
Referee: Tortura

20 August 2002
20:00

Japan	0–4	Canada
	(Report)	Sinclair 9', 45'; Lang 53', 69'

Commonwealth Stadium
Attendance: 15,714
Referee: Ionescu

22 August 2002
17:45

Denmark	1–2	Japan
Jensen 5'	(Report)	Ohno 67', 73'

Commonwealth Stadium
Attendance: 6,000
Referee: Ferreira-James

22 August 2002
20:00

Nigeria	0–2	Canada
	(Report)	Sinclair 25', 69'

Commonwealth Stadium
Attendance: 15,803
Referee: Szokolai

=== Group B ===
Team	Pts	Pld	W	D	L	GF	GA	GD
Brazil	9	3	3	0	0	10	3	+7
Germany	6	3	2	0	1	5	2	+3
France	3	3	1	0	2	2	7	−5
Mexico	0	3	0	0	3	5	10	−5

17 August 2002
17:00

Germany	2–0	France
Mittag 39', 90'	(Report)

Swangard Stadium, Vancouver
Attendance: 5,000
Referee: Persson

17 August 2002
19:30

Mexico	3–5	Brazil
Rico 8' (pen.); Worbis 66'; Martinez 74'	(Report)	Daniela 6', 14'; Tatiana 30'; Kelly 60'; Renata Costa 65'

Swangard Stadium
Attendance: 6,000
Referee: Deng

19 August 2002
17:00

France	2–1	Mexico
Ramos 21'; Abily 39'	(Report)	Worbis 15'

Swangard Stadium
Attendance: 4,500
Referee: Proctor

19 August 2002
19:30

Brazil	1–0	Germany
Kelly 60'	(Report)

Swangard Stadium
Attendance: 5,537
Referee: Seitz

21 August 2002
17:00

France	0–4	Brazil
	(Report)	Marta 44', 63', 73'; Cristiane 62'

Swangard Stadium
Attendance: 3,500
Referee: Seitz

21 August 2002
19:30

Mexico	1–3	Germany
Worbis 24'	(Report)	Müller 33'; Brendel 61'; Mittag 86'

Swangard Stadium
Attendance: 5,552
Referee: Persson

=== Group C ===
Team	Pts	Pld	W	D	L	GF	GA	GD
United States	9	3	3	0	0	15	1	+14
Australia	4	3	1	1	1	5	5	0
England	4	3	1	1	1	5	5	0
Chinese Taipei	0	3	0	0	3	1	15	−14

17 August 2002
13:00

United States	5–1	England
Tarpley 37'; Osborne 39'; O'Reilly 44'; Wilson 64', 74'	(Report)	Ward 47'

Centennial Stadium, Victoria
Attendance: 2,500
Referee: Oiwa

17 August 2002
15:15

Chinese Taipei	1–5	Australia
Lu 84'	(Report)	Crawford 30', 78'; Neilson 38'; Cannuli 85'; Harch 87'

Centennial Stadium
Attendance: 1,700
Referee: Damkova

19 August 2002
17:00

England	4–0	Chinese Taipei
Maggs 20'; Hickmott 26'; Ward 47', 85'	(Report)

Centennial Stadium
Attendance: 2,151
Referee: Gaye

19 August 2002
19:15

Australia	0–4	United States
	(Report)	Wilson 14', 79'; Osborne 74'; O'Reilly 81'

Centennial Stadium
Attendance: 2,600
Referee: Hanninen

21 August 2002
17:00

England	0–0	Australia
	(Report)

Centennial Stadium
Attendance: 3,900
Referee: Oiwa

21 August 2002
19:15

United States	6–0	Chinese Taipei
Kakadelas 3'; Tarpley 10', 43'; Buehler 34' (pen.); Hanks 48'; Ebner 59'	(Report)

Centennial Stadium
Attendance: 2,800
Referee: Gaye

== Knockout Round ==
All times local.

Quarter-finals
24 August – Vancouver
Brazil (a.s.d.e.t.)	4
Australia	3
25 August – Edmonton
Canada	6
England	2
25 August – Victoria
United States	6
Denmark	0
25 August – Edmonton
Japan	1
Germany (a.s.d.e.t.)	2

Semi-finals
29 August – Edmonton
Brazil	1 (3)
Canada (p)	1 (4)
29 August – Edmonton
United States	4
Germany	1

Final
1 September – Edmonton
Canada	0
United States (a.s.d.e.t.)	1
Third place play-off
1 September – Edmonton
Brazil	1 (3)
Germany (p)	1 (4)

=== Quarterfinals ===
24 August 2002
19:00

Brazil	4–3 (a.s.d.e.t.)	Australia
Marta 4', 45'; Kelly 42'; Daniela 100'	Report	Reuter 34'; Crawford 51'; Kuralay 59' (pen.)

Swangard Stadium, Vancouver
Attendance: 6,503
Referee: Deng

25 August 2002
13:00

Canada	6–2	England
Sinclair 5', 36', 52', 90+1', 90+3'; Thorlakson 45'	Report	Maggs 65'; Westwood 80'

Commonwealth Stadium, Edmonton
Attendance: 23,595
Referee: Ionescu

25 August 2002
15:45

Japan	1–2 (a.s.d.e.t.)	Germany
Ohno 44'	Report	Bresonik 90+3', 94'

Commonwealth Stadium, Edmonton
Attendance: 5,000
Referee: Tortura

25 August 2002
19:00

United States	6–0	Denmark
O'Reilly 11', 27'; Wilson 23', 47', 68'; Tarpley 57'	Report

Centennial Stadium, Victoria
Attendance: 4,800
Referee: Hanninen

=== Semifinals ===
29 August 2002
17:15

Brazil	1–1 (a.e.t.)	Canada
Marta 69'	Report	Rustad 45+'
Penalties
	3–4

Commonwealth Stadium, Edmonton
Attendance: 37,194
Referee: Hanninen

29 August 2002
20:00

United States	4–1	Germany
Tarpley 28'; Wilson 30', 45'; Oakes 86'	Report	Bresonik 16'

Commonwealth Stadium, Edmonton
Attendance: 10,000
Referee: Szolokai

=== Third Place Playoff ===
1 September 2002
11:00

Brazil	1–1	Germany
Cristiane 33'	Report	Bachor 49'
Penalties
	3–4

Commonwealth Stadium, Edmonton
Attendance: 35,000
Referee: Mayumi Oiwa

=== Final ===
1 September 2002
14:00

Canada	0–1 (a.s.d.e.t.)	United States
	Report	Tarpley 109'

Commonwealth Stadium, Edmonton
Attendance: 47,784
Referee: Ferreira-James

ASDET – after sudden death extra time
PSO – penalty shootout

2002 FIFA U-19 Women's World Championship winners

United States
First title

== Awards ==
The following awards were given for the tournament:

Golden Ball	Silver Ball	Bronze Ball
(Canada) Christine Sinclair	(Brazil) Marta	(United States) Kelly Wilson
Golden Shoe	Silver Shoe	Bronze Shoe
(Canada) Christine Sinclair	(United States) Kelly Wilson	(United States) Lindsay Tarpley
10 goals	9 goals	6 goals
FIFA Fair Play Award
Japan

=== All star team ===
Goalkeepers	Defenders	Midfielders	Forwards
(Canada) Erin McLeod (Japan) Miho Fukumoto	(Brazil) Daiane (Canada) Candace Chapman (England) Jessica Wright (United States) Jill Oakes	(Brazil) Daniela (Canada) Carmelina Moscato (Denmark) Johanna Rasmussen (Germany) Linda Bresonik (Nigeria) Ifeanyi Chiejine	(Brazil) Marta (Canada) Christine Sinclair (United States) Heather O'Reilly (United States) Lindsay Tarpley (United States) Kelly Wilson

== Scorers ==
10 goals

- (Canada) Christine Sinclair

9 goals

- (United States) Kelly Wilson

6 goals

- (Brazil) Marta
- (United States) Lindsay Tarpley

4 goals

- (United States) Heather O'Reilly

3 goals

- (Australia) Hayley Crawford
- (Brazil) Daniela
- (Brazil) Kelly
- (Canada) Kara Lang
- (Denmark) Johanna Rasmussen
- (Germany) Linda Bresonik
- (Germany) Anja Mittag
- (Japan) Shinobu Ohno
- (Mexico) Guadalupe Worbis

2 goals

- (Brazil) Cristiane
- (England) Ellen Maggs
- (England) Katy Ward
- (United States) Leslie Osborne

1 goal

- (Australia) Catherine Cannuli
- (Australia) Lana Harch
- (Australia) Selin Kuralay
- (Australia) Amber Neilson
- (Australia) Karla Reuter
- (Brazil) Renata Costa
- (Brazil) Tatiana
- (Canada) Michelle Rowe
- (Canada) Clare Rustad
- (Canada) Katie Thorlakson
- (Denmark) Sandra Jensen
- (Denmark) Marie Stentoft-Herping
- (England) Michelle Hickmott
- (England) Emily Westwood
- (France) Camille Abily
- (France) Elodie Ramos
- (Germany) Isabell Bachor
- (Germany) Annelie Brendel
- (Germany) Barbara Müller
- (Japan) Akiko Sudo
- (Mexico) Lisette Martinez
- (Mexico) Michell Rico
- (Nigeria) Akudo Iwuagwu
- (Nigeria) Olushola Oyewusi
- (Chinese Taipei) Lu Yen-Ling
- (United States) Rachel Buehler
- (United States) Stephanie Ebner
- (United States) Kerri Hanks
- (United States) Megan Kakadelas
- (United States) Jill Oakes
