= Kerri Hanks =

American soccer forward (born 1985)

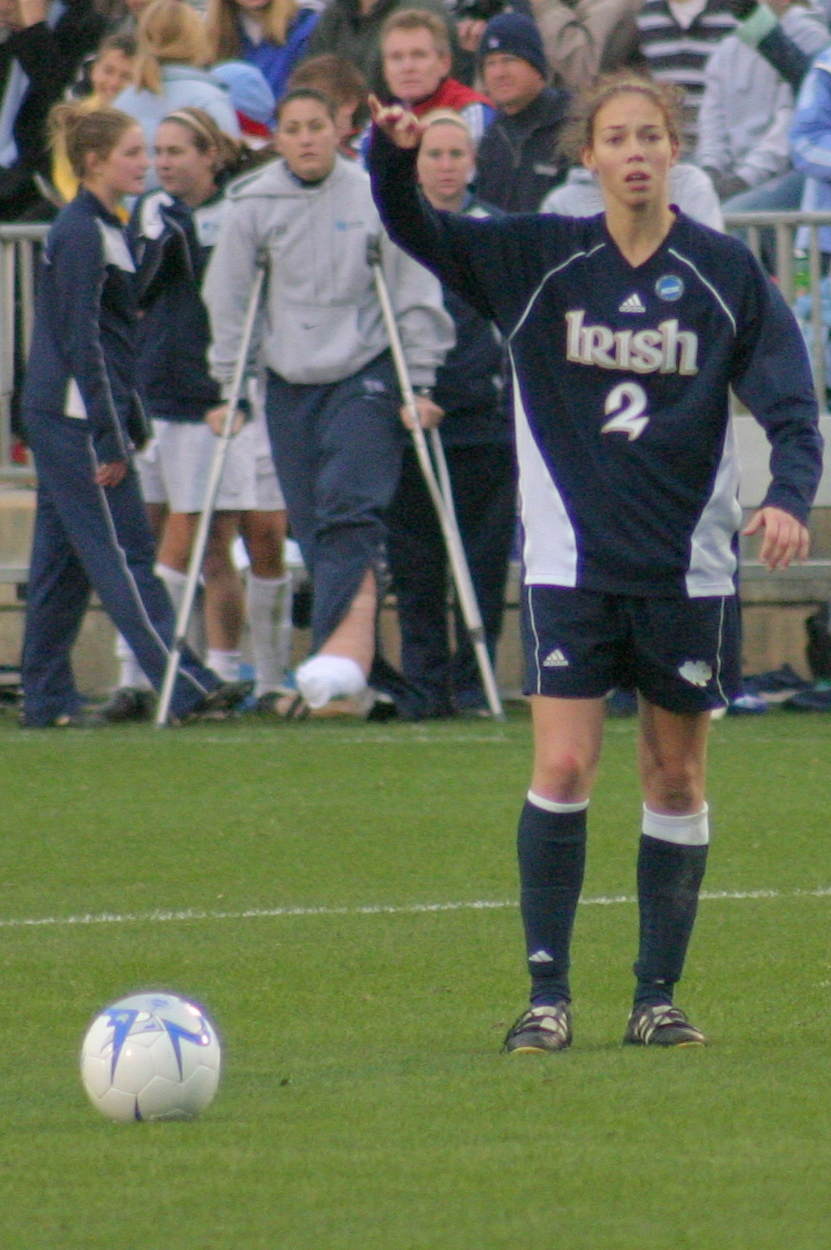

Personal information
- Full name: Kerri Michel Hanks Petersen
- Birth name: Kerri Michel Hanks
- Date of birth: September 2, 1985 (age 41)
- Place of birth: Plano, Texas, United States
- Height: 5 ft 6 in (1.68 m)
- Position: Forward

Youth career
- 1999–2005: Dallas Texans

College career
Years	Team	Apps	(Gls)
2005–2008	Notre Dame Fighting Irish	103	(84)

Senior career*
Years	Team	Apps	(Gls)
2006	F.C. Indiana	8	(6)
2009	Saint Louis Athletica	10	(1)
2009–2010	Sky Blue FC	6	(1)

International career
2001–2002	United States U-19	30	(22)
- United States U-21
- United States U-23
- * Club domestic league appearances and goals

Kerri Michel Hanks Petersen (née Hanks; born September 2, 1985) is an American soccer forward who last played for Sky Blue FC of Women's Professional Soccer. She is currently the competitive program director for Gainesville Soccer Alliance in Gainesville, Florida.

Hanks was a forward for the University of Notre Dame women's soccer team from 2005 to 2008, and is one of the most highly decorated players in the history of women's college soccer. She was the fourth player in women's college soccer to win the Hermann Trophy twice, joining Mia Hamm, Cindy Parlow, and Christine Sinclair in sharing that honor. Since then, Morgan Brian, Catarina Macario, and Jaelin Howell also won the Hermann Trophy twice.

== Early life ==
=== Notre Dame Fighting Irish ===
Hanks' first year playing for the Irish was in 2005; she held off enrolling at Notre Dame in order to participate in the 2004 FIFA U-19 Women's World Championship in Thailand. Hanks scored 28 goals as a freshman, becoming the third-highest scorer in women's college soccer for that year. Hanks is just one of 23 players ever in Division I women's soccer history to earn All-America accolades all four season and the youngest recipient by class year of the Hermann Trophy, which is presented to the top female and male soccer player in NCAA Division I soccer. Much of Hanks' success came under the mentorship of Notre Dame teammate and Canadian international Katie Thorlakson, with whom Hanks shares the NCAA record in career assists. During Hanks' second season with the Irish she led the nation in goals and assists. Hanks became the youngest recipient, male or female, of the prestigious Hermann Trophy in 2006, selected ahead of the other two finalists, North Carolina's Heather O'Reilly and Yael Averbuch. 2007 was a relatively quiet year for Hanks, despite scoring 14 goals and posting 21 assists for the Irish and making it to the semifinals of the 2007 College Cup, in which Hanks assisted on Carrie Dew's goal in the first half. However, the Irish were defeated, 2–3, by Florida State, who would then go on to lose 0–2 in the final to USC, the eventual NCAA champion.

Having finished her bachelor's degree in sociology the spring before her NCAA eligibility ended, Hanks debated over whether to continue playing for the Irish, or end her college career. Hanks decided to take one last chance at an NCAA championship title in 2008, scoring 20 goals and receiving the Lowe's Senior CLASS Award. Notre Dame was the top-ranked team in 2008 heading into the 2008 College Cup, defeating Stanford in the semifinal, 1–0, on a goal by Courtney Barg. During the championship game, Hanks scored the fastest goal in the history of the College Cup Final, 16 seconds after the game had started. Winning the championship, however, was not to be; North Carolina responded to Hanks' goal with two goals from Casey Nogueira, and the Irish fell to the Tar Heels, 1–2.

Despite that loss, Hanks would receive the Hermann Trophy for the second time, over Nogueira and UCLA's Christina DiMartino. Hanks ended her career at Notre Dame with 84 goals, 73 assists, and 241 points, joining Mia Hamm and Jenny Streiffer as only the third person to reach 70 goals and 70 assists in her college career. Hanks 241 points are the most in school history.

== Playing career ==
=== Club ===
Hanks was selected sixth overall in the 2009 Women's Professional Soccer draft, going to the Saint Louis Athletica in the first round. Halfway through the 2009 season, on June 26, 2009, Hanks was traded to Sky Blue FC and helped lead the team to the 2009 WPS Championship.

During the 2010 WPS preseason, Sky Blue FC waived Hanks on March 10, 2010; that same day, she was picked up by the Philadelphia Independence. Six days later, on March 16, Hanks left the Independence and joined the Atlanta Beat preseason camp. Atlanta released Hanks on March 26, choosing to keep an extra defender instead.

In early April, Hanks resurfaced at tryouts for Icelandic club Stjarnan F.C. in Portugal.

=== International ===
Hanks was a member of the United States U-19 national soccer team that participated in the 2002 FIFA U-19 Women's World Championship in Canada; she was one of the youngest players on that squad, which won the inaugural championship title. She would return to the U-19s to play in the 2004 FIFA U-19 Women's World Championship in Thailand, where the United States finished third. Hanks is currently ranked second behind Ashlyn Harris in all-time appearances (30) for the U-20 national team, as well as third all-time in goals scored (22) for the U-20s, behind Kelly Wilson and current national team star Lindsay Tarpley.

Hanks competed for the United States U-23 women's national soccer team in 2008, playing in the 2008 Nordic Cup and appearing in all four matches of the tournament.

Notable former teammates consist of the USWNT’s Ashlyn Harris, Ali Krieger, Megan Rapinoe, Becky Sauerbrunn, and Hope Solo.

== Coaching ==
In August 2010, Hanks joined the Texas Christian University women's soccer coaching staff. In addition to her TCU duties, Hanks also coaches the Sting West Silver team of Fort Worth. In 2012, Hanks left the TCU soccer program, and will be relocating to Florida with husband Nic Petersen. After moving to Florida she started coaching the club, Gainesville Soccer Alliance in 2022.

== Personal ==
On July 28, 2012, Hanks married Nic Petersen, Assistant Coach for Jumps at the University of Florida Track program.
