= Cecilie Pedersen =

Cecilie Pedersen is the name of:

- Cecilie Pedersen (Danish footballer) (born 1983), Danish footballer
- Cecilie Pedersen (Norwegian footballer) (born 1990), Norwegian footballer
