= Ary Paghetti =

Brazilian footballer (1947–2026)

Personal information
- Date of birth: 4 August 1949
- Place of birth: São Paulo, Brazil
- Date of death: 29 January 2026 (aged 76)
- Position: Attacking midfielder

Senior career*
Years	Team	Apps	(Gls)
- Portuguesa
- Rio Branco de Andradas
–1973	Atlético Goianiense		
1973–1976	Goiás		(36)
1978	Anapolina		
- * Club domestic league appearances and goals

Ary Paghetti (4 August 1947 – 29 January 2026) was a Brazilian footballer who played as a attacking midfielder.

== Career ==
Paghetti began his career at Portuguesa, before joining Rio Branco de Andradas and later Atlético Goianiense in the late 1960s. In 1973, he signed for Goiás after being recommended to the club by manager Paulo Gonçalves, and later scored 36 goals for the club between 1973 and 1976. On 6 February 1974, he famously scored a hat-trick for the club in a 4–4 draw against Santos at the Pacaembu Stadium. In 1975, he played for Goiás in the inaugural match at the Estádio Serra Dourada. He later played for Anapolina in 1978.

Following his retirement from football, Paghetti became a businessman in Goiás.

== Death ==
Paghetti died at his home on 29 January 2026, at the age of 78, following a heart attack. On 4 August 2026, roughly six months after his death, his former club Goiás posted a message on social media wishing him a happy birthday, despite his death earlier in the year.

== Honours ==
Atlético Goianiense

- Campeonato Goiano: 1970
- Torneio de Integração Nacional: 1971

Goias

- Copa Leonino Caiado: 1973, 1974, 1975
- Campeonato Goiano: 1975, 1976
