= Amy Steadman =

American soccer player (born 1984)

Personal information
- Full name: Amy Elizabeth Steadman
- Date of birth: September 8, 1984 (age 42)
- Place of birth: Brevard, North Carolina, U.S.
- Height: 5 ft 2 in (1.57 m)
- Position: Defender

Youth career
- Greensboro Twisters
- Atlanta Lightning
- –2002: Brevard Blue Devils

College career
Years	Team	Apps	(Gls)
2003–2004	North Carolina Tar Heels	37	(3)

International career
2002	United States U19		
2003	United States U21		
2001	United States	4	(0)

Amy Elizabeth Steadman (born September 8, 1984) is an American former soccer player who played as a defender, making four appearances for the United States women's national team.

== Career ==
In high school, she played for the Brevard Blue Devils, where she was rated by Soccer America as the third-best high school soccer prospect in the U.S. She was also selected as a Parade and NSCAA High-School All-American in 2001 and 2002. She also ran track for two seasons, winning the WAC Conference Runner award and state 400 metres in 2001, and participated in swimming for one year at Brevard. She played youth club soccer for the Greensboro Twisters and the Atlanta Lightning, winning the under-19 national championship with the latter. In college, Steadman played for the North Carolina Tar Heels from 2003 to 2004, where she was a letter-winner. She enrolled at UNC a year-and-a-half prior to her scheduled high school graduation, though she had to redshirt during the 2002 season to recover from a torn ACL. The 2003 season, which saw Carolina win the 2003 NCAA Division I Women's Soccer Tournament, was ended early for Steadman after she again tore her ACL. In February 2005, extensive damage was revealed on her knee when undergoing a fifth surgery in three-and-a-half years, revealing she had played the previous season without an ACL and had no meniscus. Shortly after, she decided to give up her athletic career entirely. In total, she scored 3 goals and recorded 2 assists in 37 appearances for the Tar Heels.

Steadman was part of the U.S. under-19 squad that won the 2002 FIFA U-19 Women's World Championship in Canada, though she tore her ACL during the tournament. She also played for the under-21 national team. She made her international debut for the United States on March 11, 2001 in the 2001 Algarve Cup against Canada. In total, she made four appearances for the U.S., earning her final cap on March 17, 2001 in the Algarve Cup against Norway.

== Personal life ==
Steadman is a native of Brevard, North Carolina. She serves as the vice president of media strategy and business development for the National Football League.

== Career statistics ==
=== International ===
United States
Year	Apps	Goals
2001	4	0
Total	4	0

== Honors ==
North Carolina Tar Heels

- NCAA Division I women's soccer tournament: 2003

United States U19

- FIFA U-19 Women's World Championship: 2002
