= Per Rud =

Danish manager and sporting director

Personal information
- Date of birth: 21 February 1967 (age 59)
- Place of birth: Kolding, Denmark

Team information
- Current team: HB Køge (sporting director)

Senior career*
Years	Team	Apps	(Gls)
- Bramdrupdam GIF
- Kolding IF

Managerial career
- 1993–1996: Kolding IF
- 1996–1998: TSV Nord Harrislee 05
- 1999–2003: Døllefjelde-Musse
- 2000–2001: Denmark Women's U17
- 2001–2003: Denmark Women's U19
- * Club domestic league appearances and goals

Per Rud (born 21 February 1967) is a Danish football manager and executive. He currently serves as the sporting director of HB Køge.

== Managerial career ==
Rud played lower-level football for Bramdrupdam GIF alongside future cultural researcher and author, Torben Sangild. He then moved to Kolding IF, where he began coaching youth teams from an early age. Later on, he developed his coaching at Kjøbenhavns Boldklub (KB), before returning to Kolding IF in the position as head coach in 1993. Between 1996 and 1998, Rud managed TSV Nord Harrislee 05 in the Oberliga Schleswig-Holstein.

Rud returned to Denmark in 1999, managing Denmark Series team Døllefjelde-Musse for four years, during which he also coached the Denmark Women's U17 and U19 teams. As part of the Danish Football Association (DBU), Rud completed his A-licence.

== Executive career ==
=== Herfølge ===
Rud began his executive career in 2004, where he became sporting director of Herfølge Boldklub. During his tenure, the club underwent several major changes, including a merger with nearby club Køge Boldklub to form HB Køge in 2009.

=== Brøndby ===
On 2 July 2013, Rud was presented as the new sporting director of Danish Superliga club Brøndby IF. In his first two seasons in charge, Rud presented some high-profile signings, including Khalid Boulahrouz and Teemu Pukki, and the return of several Brøndby legends in Thomas Kahlenberg, Johan Elmander and, most notably, Daniel Agger from Liverpool.

Rud was dismissed on 19 June 2015 and replaced by former manager Troels Bech after a tumultuous period, where new chairman Jan Bech Andersen had discredited several key figures in the club, including Rud, on an online chat-forum under the name of "Oscar", the case being referred to as "Oscar-gate" by the media. Head coach Thomas Frank would later also resign after revelations.

=== Þróttur ===
Rud was announced as the new sporting director of Icelandic club Þróttur on 20 October 2015. His signings included several players from the Danish Superliga, including former Esbjerg fB talent Thiago and Brøndby and Arsenal player Sebastian Svärd.

=== HB Køge ===
After one season with Þróttur, Rud returned to Denmark where he was appointed sporting director and chairman of his former club, HB Køge.

On 31 March 2021, Rud appointed former player Daniel Agger as the new head coach of HB Køge, with another former player, Lars Jacobsen, as his assistant; their first experiences with coaching. He also announced high-profile signings such as Mike Jensen and Jon Flanagan.
