= Germany women's national under-19 football team =

National U-19 association football team

Germany
- Nickname(s): Die Nationalelf (The National Eleven)
- Association: German Football Association (Deutscher Fußball-Bund, DFB)
- Confederation: UEFA (Europe)
- Head coach: Michael Urbansky
- FIFA code: GER
First colours	Second colours

First international
- Germany 2–3 Sweden (Sweden; October 10, 2001)

Biggest win
- Germany 21–0 Estonia (Dungannon, Northern Ireland; October 5, 2018)

Biggest defeat
- Germany 0–4 Denmark (Denmark; August 07, 2002); Germany 0–4 United States (Germany; July 02, 2003)

European Championship
- Appearances: 23 (first in 1998)
- Best result: Champions (2000, 2001, 2002, 2006, 2007, 2011)

The Germany women's national under-19 football team represents the female under-19s of Germany in the UEFA Women's Under-19 Championship, and is controlled by the German Football Association.

== History ==
=== Change of U-18 to U-19 ===
The first four tournaments of the UEFA Women's Under-19 Championship were in the U-18 category. In 2001, the German Football Association decided to change the age limit from the U-18 team to U-19. The move was in preparation for 2002 UEFA Women's Under-19 Championship (competition that served as a qualifying tournament for the 2002 FIFA U-19 Women's World Championship).

== Results ==
=== UEFA Women's Under-19 Championship ===
The German team has participated in the UEFA Women's Under-19 Championship 20 times; Winning it six times and setting the record for more titles.

Year	Result	Matches	Wins	Draws*	Losses	GF	GA
Two-legged final 1998	Semi-finals	4	2	1	1	5	4
(Sweden) 1999	Runners-up	3	2	0	1	4	2
(France) 2000	Champions	4	3	1	0	9	3
(Norway) 2001	Champions	2	2	0	0	5	2
(Sweden) 2002	Champions	5	5	0	0	10	3
(Germany) 2003	Group stage	3	1	0	2	7	4
(Finland) 2004	Runners-up	5	4	0	1	24	2
(Hungary) 2005	Semi-finals	4	3	0	1	11	6
(Switzerland) 2006	Champions	5	4	1	0	14	1
(Iceland) 2007	Champions	5	5	0	0	13	4
(France) 2008	Semi-finals	4	2	2	0	11	2
(Belarus) 2009	Group stage	3	2	0	1	11	4
(North Macedonia) 2010	Semi-finals	4	3	1	0	12	4
(Italy) 2011	Champions	5	5	0	0	17	4
(Turkey) 2012	Did not qualify						
(Wales) 2013	Semi-finals	4	2	1	1	9	3
(Norway) 2014	Did not qualify						
(Israel) 2015	Semi-finals	4	2	1	1	6	6
(Slovakia) 2016	Group stage	3	1	0	2	5	6
(Northern Ireland) 2017	Semi-finals	4	3	0	1	12	2
(Switzerland) 2018	Runners-up	5	3	0	2	5	2
(Scotland) 2019	Runners-up	5	3	1	1	11	4
(Georgia (country)) ~~2020~~	Cancelled						
(Belarus) ~~2021~~	Cancelled						
(Czech Republic) 2022	Group stage	3	1	0	2	4	4
(Belgium) 2023	Runners-up	5	3	1	1	12	5
(Lithuania) 2024	Group stage	3	1	1	1	3	4
(Poland) 2025	Did not qualify						
(Bosnia and Herzegovina) 2026	Runners-up	5	3	1	1	9	2
(Hungary) 2027	TBD						
Total	23/26	97	65	12	20	229	83

== Players ==
Squad for 2025 UEFA Women's Under-19 Championship qualification in Poland

Caps and goals as of 3 December 2024.

Head coach: Michael Urbansky

No.	Pos.	Player	Date of birth (age)	Caps	Goals	Club
1	GK	Thea Farwick	9 June 2006 (age 20)	6	0	(German Football Association) SV Meppen
	GK	Paula Hoppe	25 March 2006 (age 20)	1	0	(German Football Association) 1. FC Köln
	GK	Janne Krumme	22 May 2007 (age 19)	0	0	(German Football Association) FSV Gütersloh 2009
	DF	Maresa Arici	30 January 2007 (age 19)	3	0	(German Football Association) Borussia Mönchengladbach
	DF	Nadine Bitzer	30 May 2006 (age 20)	2	0	(German Football Association) TSG 1899 Hoffenheim
	DF	Karla Brinkmann	31 October 2006 (age 20)	8	1	(German Football Association) VfL Wolfsburg
3	DF	Emma Memminger	19 January 2007 (age 19)	5	0	(German Football Association) Eintracht Frankfurt
5	DF	Svenja Vöhringer	4 September 2007 (age 19)	5	0	(German Football Association) TSG 1899 Hoffenheim
	MF	Lisa Baum	25 November 2006 (age 19)	5	2	(German Football Association) Hamburger SV
9	MF	Delice Boboy	30 October 2006 (age 20)	14	4	(German Football Association) Bayer 04 Leverkusen
4	MF	Merle Hokamp	30 January 2007 (age 19)	9	0	(German Football Association) FSV Gütersloh 2009
6	MF	Greta Hünten	8 December 2007 (age 18)	5	0	(German Football Association) FC Bayern Munich
11	MF	Melina Krüger	5 January 2006 (age 20)	17	6	(German Football Association) Hamburger SV
7	MF	Laila Portella	7 May 2007 (age 19)	6	3	(German Football Association) FC Bayern Munich
	MF	Milena Röder	2 July 2006 (age 20)	10	0	(German Football Association) TSG 1899 Hoffenheim
8	MF	Maj Schneider	29 August 2007 (age 19)	5	2	(German Football Association) SC Freiburg
	MF	Tessa Zimmermann	30 October 2007 (age 19)	4	0	(German Football Association) Eintracht Frankfurt
10	FW	Estrella Merino Gonzalez	19 November 2006 (age 19)	15	3	(German Football Association) Bayer 04 Leverkusen
	FW	Rosa Rückert	12 May 2007 (age 19)	5	2	(German Football Association) Eintracht Frankfurt
	FW	Leonie Schetter	18 July 2006 (age 20)	11	3	(German Football Association) TSG 1899 Hoffenheim
2	FW	Marina Scholz	18 February 2006 (age 20)	9	4	(German Football Association) 1. FC Nürnberg

== See also ==
- Germany women's national football team
- Germany women's national under-20 football team
- Germany women's national under-17 football team
- FIFA U-20 Women's World Cup
- UEFA Women's Under-19 Championship
