= United States women's national under-20 soccer team =

United States under-20
- Nickname(s): Team USA; The Stars and Stripes; The Yanks
- Association: United States Soccer Federation
- Confederation: CONCACAF (North America)
- Head coach: Vicky Jepson; Carrie Kveton (interim during 2025 CONCACAF Women's U-20 Championship)
- Most caps: Maya Hayes (43)
- Top scorer: Kelly Wilson (31)
- FIFA code: USA
First colors	Second colors

FIFA U-20 Women's World Cup
- Appearances: 12 (first in 2002)
- Best result: Champions (2002, 2008, 2012)

Pan American Games
- Appearances: 1 (first in 2007)
- Best result: Silver (2007)

CONCACAF Women's U-20 Championship
- Appearances: 13 (first in 2002)
- Best result: Champions (2006, 2010, 2012, 2014, 2015, 2020, 2022)
Medal record
FIFA U-20 Women's World Cup
Gold medal – first place	2002 Canada	Team
Gold medal – first place	2008 Chile	Team
Gold medal – first place	2012 Japan	Team
Bronze medal – third place	2004 Thailand	Team
Bronze medal – third place	2024 Colombia	Team
Pan American Games
Silver medal – second place	2007 Rio de Janeiro	Team
CONCACAF Women's U-20 Championship
Gold medal – first place	2006 Mexico
Gold medal – first place	2010 Guatemala
Gold medal – first place	2012 Panama
Gold medal – first place	2014 Cayman Islands
Gold medal – first place	2015 Honduras
Gold medal – first place	2020 Dominican Republic
Gold medal – first place	2022 Dominican Republic
Silver medal – second place	2004 Canada
Silver medal – second place	2008 Mexico
Silver medal – second place	2018 Trinidad and Tobago
Silver medal – second place	2023 Dominican Republic

The United States U-20 women's national soccer team is a youth soccer team operated under the auspices of U.S. Soccer. Its primary role is the development of players in preparation for the senior women's national team. The team most recently appeared in the 2024 FIFA U-20 Women's World Cup in Colombia, where they won bronze. The team competes in a variety of competitions, including the biennial FIFA U-20 Women's World Cup, which is the top competition for this age group.

== History ==
=== Beginnings as a U-18 program ===
The United States U-20 team has been active since 1998; however, it was run as a U-18 team from its inception until 2001. It was led by Shannon Higgins-Cirovski, the first coach in the team's history, through the middle of 1999 before she left for the Maryland Terrapins soccer team. Jay Hoffman, who served as Higgins-Cirovski's assistant, took charge of the team and led them to a gold medal for the 1999 Pan American Games, the first time the tournament was open to women's teams. Among the U-18 women playing at the 1999 Pan American Games were future senior national team members Cat Whitehill and Hope Solo.

=== The switch to U-19 ===
==== 2001 through 2003 ====
In 2001, the United States Soccer Federation decided to change the age limit from the U-18 team to U-19. The move was in preparation for FIFA's introduction of the first ever FIFA U-19 Women's World Championship (which has since changed). The new U-19 squad won the inaugural 2002 FIFA U-19 Women's World Championship in Canada, where they beat the hosts on a golden goal by captain and future United States women's national team mainstay Lindsay Tarpley. Five other members of that same team would join Tarpley as teammates on the senior international team: Rachel Buehler, Lori Chalupny, Heather O'Reilly, Leslie Osborne and Angie Woznuk. Other notable 2002 team members were Kelly Wilson, the all-time leading goal scorer in the history of the U-20 team, as well as two-time Hermann Trophy winner Kerri Hanks, who would go on to become one of the most decorated players in women's collegiate soccer.

==== 2004 ====
In 2004, the U-19 team placed third at the 2004 FIFA U-19 Women's World Championship in Thailand, after having been defeated by Germany in the semifinals. The tournament marked the world championship debut of future senior national team members Yael Averbuch, Stephanie Lopez, Amy Rodriguez and Megan Rapinoe. However, in 2006, FIFA increased the age limit of the FIFA U-19 Women's World Championship to 20. 2004 also saw the first loss to a similar-aged team in the history of the program when the squad lost to Japan.

=== Competing as a U-20 team ===
==== 2005 and 2006 ====
As the United States Soccer Federation did in 2001 prior to the introduction of the U-19 tournament, they raised the age of the squad from U-19 to U-20 in 2005. The move was, again, in response to FIFA's altering of the competition from U-19 to U-20. The actual team's play in 2005 was quiet due to a transition in coaches.

In 2006, the United States U-20 team played in a whopping 50 matches prior to the 2006 FIFA U-20 Women's World Championship in Russia; however, the team finished in fourth place. The U.S. lost to China in penalties in the semifinal and followed up the loss with another to Brazil in the third-place match, also on penalties. Seven members of that 2006 team: Lauren Cheney, Christina DiMartino, Tobin Heath, Stephanie Lopez, Casey Nogueira, Kelley O'Hara and Amy Rodriguez, have made appearances for the senior national team. Lopez played in the 2007 FIFA Women's World Cup, and, joined by Cheney, Heath and Rodriguez, also represented the United States at the 2008 Summer Olympics. Nogueira and O'Hara helped the 2008 U-20 team to qualify for the 2008 FIFA U-20 Women's World Cup that same year.

==== 2007 and 2008 ====
2007 saw the squad sent to the 2007 Pan American Games, just as they had done prior in the 1999 Pan American Games. This time around, the United States sent along two "over-aged players" in Lauren Cheney and Brittany Taylor. The decision proved costly as the supplemented U-20 team were dismantled in the finals, 5–0, to a full-strength Brazil squad.

In 2008, two years removed from the disastrous fourth-place finish at the 2006 U-20 World Championship, the United States U-20 women finally reclaimed the World Cup title at the 2008 FIFA U-20 Women's World Cup in Chile, with Sydney Leroux winning the Golden Ball and Golden Shoe for being named the best player of the tournament as well as scoring the most goals. Alex Morgan earned the Silver Shoe as the tournament's second-highest scorer and the Silver Ball as the tournament's second-best player behind teammate Leroux. To date, Alex Morgan, Sydney Leroux, Christine Nairn, Alyssa Naeher, and Meghan Klingenberg are the only members of the 2008 squad to be capped by the senior national team.

==== 2009 and 2010 ====
In 2009, Tony DiCicco handed the coaching reins back to Jill Ellis, who had coached the 2007 Pan American Games squad. 2009 also saw the influx of players who took part in the inaugural FIFA U-17 Women's World Cup into the U-20s, including Kristen Mewis, US Soccer's 2008 Young Female Player of the Year, and Vicki DiMartino, younger sister of U-20 alumni Christina (2006) and Gina (2007–2008). Two members of the 2008 squad, Sydney Leroux and Christine Nairn, returned to captain the team through the next World Cup cycle.

The team won the 2010 CONCACAF Under-20 Women's Championship title the next year and secured a berth to the 2010 FIFA U-20 Women's World Cup, to be held in Germany. Sydney Leroux was the leading scorer at the tournament with six goals. In the World Cup, they won their group, but lost on penalty kicks to Nigeria in the quarterfinals. Leroux was again their leading scorer, tallying five goals in their four matches.

==== 2011 and 2012 ====
In 2011, Steve Swanson was named coach of the squad for the second time, after having coached in 2000. To prepare for the 2012 FIFA U-20 Women's World Cup in Japan, the team played 8 friendlies (winning seven) and qualifying with ease for the World Cup, scoring 24 goals in the qualifying tournament, while conceding only once.

In the World Cup, the squad was led by a Maya Hayes hat trick en route to beating Ghana 4–0. After a 1–1 draw against China, and a 3–0 loss to Germany, the US qualified for the quarterfinals over China on goal differential. In the quarterfinals, Chioma Ubogagu scored in extra time in a 2–1 victory over North Korea. In the semifinal, Morgan Brian and Kealia Ohai scored in a 2–0 win over Nigeria. The final was a rematch with Germany. Ohai scored right before halftime, and the US held on for a 1–0 win and their third World Cup championship.

==== 2013 and 2014 ====
Following the 2012 World Cup win, Michelle French took over the U-20 program. Defenders Cari Roccaro and Stephanie Amack returned from the 2012 World Cup winning side to lead the team along with Paris Saint-Germain target woman Lindsey Horan, the first American woman to skip college and turn professional, and Andi Sullivan, who was named co-captain despite being the youngest player on the squad during qualifiers. The US team again coasted through the CONCACAF qualifying tournament, winning all five matches without conceding a goal.

In the finals, they started out in a Group of Death with international powerhouses Germany, Brazil, and China. They lost 2–0 to Germany in their opening game, but took wins against Brazil and China. The second-place finish in their group meant that they played North Korea in the next round. The match went into extra time and then a penalty shootout. Savannah Jordan, Lindsey Horan, and Rose Lavelle were all denied by Korean keeper Kim on weak efforts from the spot, securing the win for North Korea.

==== 2016–present ====
In 2016, the team participated in the 2016 FIFA U-20 Women's World Cup, and made it to the semifinals, where they lost to North Korea again in extra time. They then lost to Japan in the third-place match.

In February 2017, US Soccer reassigned Michelle French to be a full-time assistant coach for the senior women's national team, with Jitka Klimková replacing her as head coach in April 2017. Jitka Klimkova replaced Michelle French as the new coach of the under-20 team.

The team finished runners-up in the 2018 CONCACAF Women's U-20 Championship. In the 2018 FIFA U-20 Women's World Cup, the team failed to progress from the group stage for the first time in history. Mark Carr took over the team from Jitka Klimkova in 2019 and prepared them for the upcoming competition year.

In January 2020, Laura Harvey was named the head coach and lead the team to a 4–1 victory over Mexico in the 2020 CONCACAF Women's U-20 Championship Championship game and qualifying the team for the 2020 FIFA U-20 Women's World Cup. In November 2020, FIFA announced that the 2020 FIFA U-20 Women's World Cup would be cancelled due to COVID-19.

After an extended period off due to COVID restrictions, Tracey Kevins was named the head coach of the women's U-20 team. The U-20 team returned to international soccer with a roar winning the 2022 CONCACAF Women's U-20 Championship and qualifying for the FIFA U-20 Women's World Cup. Performance in the FIFA U-20 Women's World Cup was similar to what the team had experienced in 2018, with the team unable to get out of the group stage.

== Competitive record ==
=== FIFA U-20 Women's World Cup ===
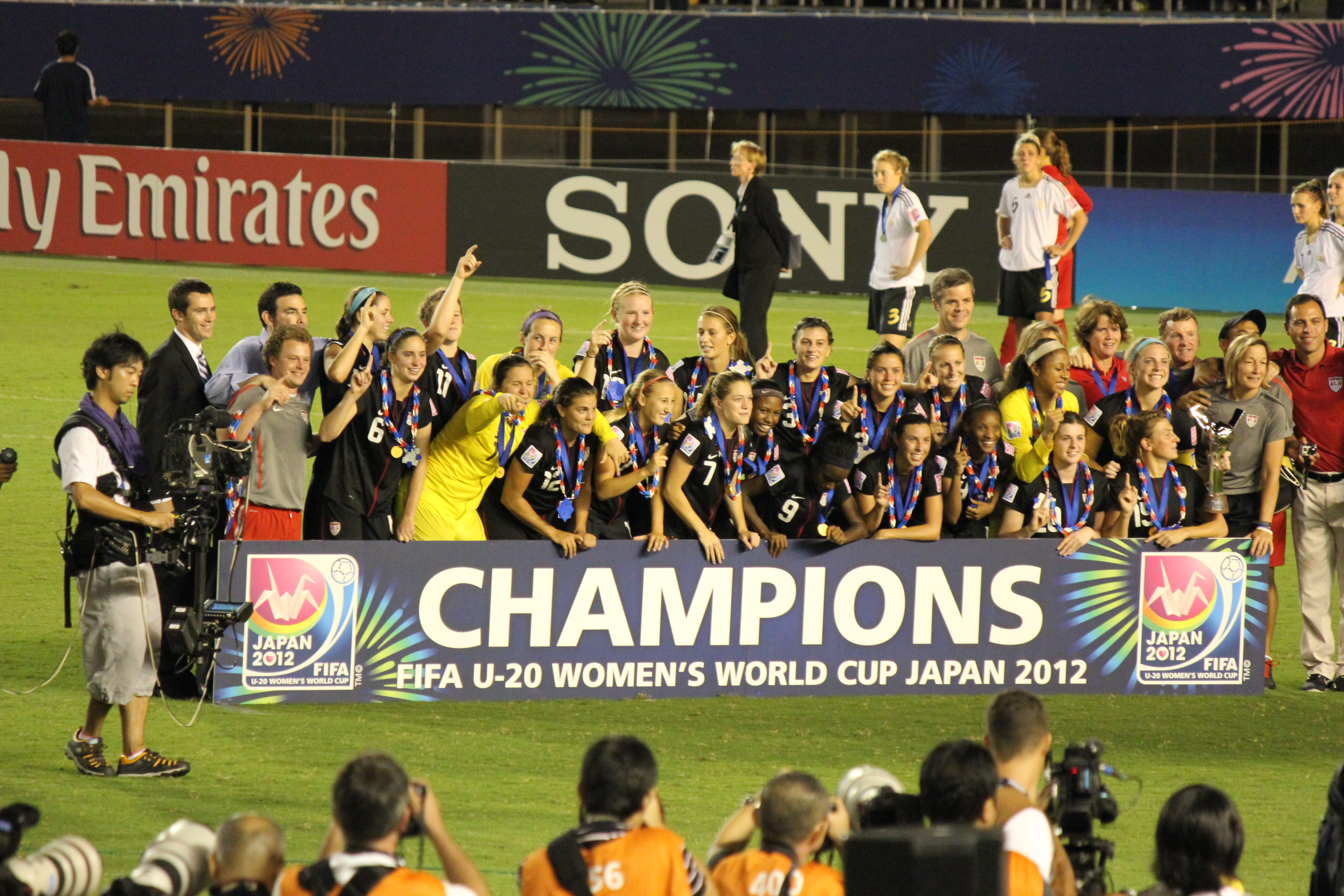
After the award ceremony at the 2012 FIFA Under-20 Women'S World Cup in Japan

Year	Result	Pld	W	D*	L	GF	GA	Coach	Squad
(Canada) 2002	Champions	6	6	0	0	26	2	Tracey Leone	Squad
(Thailand) 2004	Third place	6	5	0	1	14	4	Mark Krikorian	Squad
(Russia) 2006	Fourth place	6	4	2	0	11	3	Tim Schulz	Squad
(Chile) 2008	Champions	6	5	0	1	12	3	Tony DiCicco	Squad
(Germany) 2010	Quarter-finals	4	2	2	0	8	2	Jill Ellis	Squad
(Japan) 2012	Champions	6	4	1	1	10	5	Steve Swanson	Squad
(Canada) 2014	Quarter-finals	4	2	1	1	5	3	Michelle French	Squad
(Papua New Guinea) 2016	Fourth place	6	2	2	2	7	6	Michelle French	Squad
(France) 2018	Group stage	3	1	1	1	8	3	Jitka Klimková	Squad
(Costa Rica) 2022	Group stage	3	1	0	2	4	6	Tracey Kevins	Squad
(Colombia) 2024	Third place	7	4	1	2	16	7	Tracey Kevins	Squad
(Poland) 2026	Round of 16	4	1	2	1	13	5	Vicky Jepson	Squad
Total	3 Titles	61	37	12	12	134	49	—N/a	

*Denotes draws include knockout matches decided via penalty shoot-out.

=== Pan American Games ===
The under-18 team participated and won the inaugural soccer tournament in the 1999 Pan American Games, while the under-20 team lost in the final of the 2007 Pan American Games, competing against full national teams. These opportunities are a consequence of holding the FIFA Women's World Cup in the same year as the Pan American Games.

Year	Result	Pld	W	D*	L	GF	GA	Coach
(Canada) 1999	See United States women's national under-18 soccer team							
(Dominican Republic) 2003	Did not participate							
(Brazil) 2007	Silver medal	6	4	0	2	17	11	Jill Ellis
(Mexico) 2011	Did not participate							
(Canada) 2015	Did not participate							
(Peru) 2019	Did not participate							
(Chile) 2023	See United States women's national under-19 soccer team							
Total	0 Title	6	4	0	2	17	11	—N/a

*Denotes draws include knockout matches decided via penalty shoot-out.

=== CONCACAF Women's U-20 Championship ===
The U-20 women have won the CONCACAF Women's U-20 Championship seven times, in 2006, 2010, 2012, 2014, 2015, 2020 and 2022; the 2002 tournament did not have a championship final. The U-20s finished as runners-up to Canada in 2004 and 2008 and to Mexico in 2018 and 2023. The U-20s fell to Canada at semifinals in 2025, the first time has not advanced to the title game of the tournament.

Year	Result	Pld	W	D*	L	GF	GA	Coach	Squad
(Trinidad and Tobago) 2002	Group winners	3	3	0	0	34	1	Tracey Leone	Squad
(Canada) 2004	Runners-up	5	3	1	1	32	3	Mark Krikorian	Squad
(Mexico) 2006	Champions	5	5	0	0	19	3	Tim Schulz	Squad
(Mexico) 2008	Runners-up	5	4	0	1	20	1	Tony DiCicco	Squad
(Guatemala) 2010	Champions	5	5	0	0	15	2	Jill Ellis	Squad
(Panama) 2012	Champions	4	4	0	0	24	1	Steve Swanson	Squad
(Cayman Islands) 2014	Champions	5	5	0	0	29	0	Michelle French	Squad
(Honduras) 2015	Champions	5	4	1	0	22	3	Michelle French	Squad
(Trinidad and Tobago) 2018	Runners-up	5	3	2	0	8	4	Jitka Klimková	Squad
(Dominican Republic) 2020	Champions	7	7	0	0	44	1	Laura Harvey	Squad
(Dominican Republic) 2022	Champions	7	7	0	0	49	0	Tracey Kevins	Squad
(Dominican Republic) 2023	Runners-up	5	4	0	1	18	5	Tracey Kevins	Squad
(Costa Rica) 2025	Semi-finals	4	3	0	1	15	2	Carrie Kveton	Squad
Total	7 Titles	65	57	4	4	329	26	—N/a	

*Denotes draws include knockout matches decided via penalty shoot-out.

== Fixtures and results ==
The following is a list of match results in the last 12 months, as well as any future matches that have been scheduled.

Legend Win Draw Lose Fixture

=== 2025 ===
November 29 Friendly	England	1–4	United States	San Pedro del Pinatar, Spain
	Gale 90+4'	Report	Long 24', 44'; Pfeiffer 80', 90+8'	Stadium: Pinatar Arena; Attendance: 50; Referee: Mireya Lopez Reche (Spain)

December 2 Friendly	United States	1–0	China	San Pedro del Pinatar, Spain
	Engle 29'	Report		Stadium: Pinatar Arena; Attendance: 50; Referee: Marta Mora Del Oso (Spain)

=== 2026 ===
April 11 friendly	United States	2–0	Brazil	Kansas City, Missouri
	Ullmark 24'; Ascanio 76'	Report		Stadium: CPKC Stadium; Attendance: 1,600; Referee: Matt Feringer (United States)

April 15 friendly	United States	1–1	Brazil	Kansas City, Missouri
	Ascanio 24'	Report	Vitorinha 15'	Stadium: Riverside Stadium; Attendance: 300; Referee: Drew Klemp (United States)

June 5 friendly	United States	5–0	Spain	Algeciras, Spain
	Ullmark 3', 45+1', 49'; Barcenas 79'; Buck 90'	Report		Stadium: Estadio Nuevo Mirador; Referee: Ildefonso Enrique Cozar Andrades (Spain)

June 8 friendly	United States	2–1	France	Algeciras, Spain
	Johnson 66'; Adames 80'	Report	Oillic 56'	Stadium: Estadio Nuevo Mirador; Referee: Patricia Luna Varo (Spain)

July 9 friendly	United States	1–1	England	Fayetteville, Georgia
				Stadium: U.S. Soccer National Training Center

July 12 friendly	United States	0–1	Colombia	Fayetteville, Georgia
		Report	Silva 22'	Stadium: U.S. Soccer National Training Center; Referee: Justin Higgins (United States)

September 6 2026 FIFA U-20 Women's World Cup GS	United States	1–2	Italy	Łódź, Poland
18:00 pm	M. Johnson 18'	Report	Fadda 40'; Pellegrino Cimò 59'	Stadium: Stadion Miejski ŁKS Łódź; Attendance: 267; Referee: Casey Reibelt (Australia)

September 9 2026 FIFA U-20 Women's World Cup GS	Japan	2–2	United States	Łódź, Poland
18:00 pm	Tago 74'; Nakamura 83'	Report	McCammon 35'; Buck 75'	Stadium: Stadion Miejski ŁKS Łódź; Attendance: 718; Referee: Marta Huerta (Spain)

September 12 2026 FIFA U-20 Women's World Cup GS	New Zealand	0–9	United States	Sosnowiec, Poland
15:00 pm		Report	Buck 4', 58'; Fuller 6', 83', 90+2' (pen.); M. Johnson 38'; Ullmark 43'; Adames 60'; Strawn 87'	Stadium: Arena Sosnowiec; Attendance: 375; Referee: Anahí Fernández (Uruguay)

September 16 2026 FIFA U-20 Women's World Cup R16	Brazil	1–1 (a.e.t.) (5–4 p)	United States	Katowice, Poland
15:00 pm	Sofia Couto 59'	Report	McCammon 63'	Stadium: Arena Katowice; Attendance: 314; Referee: Silvia Gasperotti (Italy)
	Penalties
	Brendha (penalty scored); Gisele (penalty scored); Emilly Lucas (penalty scored); Aninha (penalty scored); Bianca (penalty scored)		(penalty missed) Adames; (penalty scored) McCammon; (penalty scored) Nguyen; (penalty scored) Joseph; (penalty scored) Alvarez

== Players ==
=== Current squad ===
The following 24 players were named to the squad for the 2026 FIFA U-20 Women's World Cup.

Caps and goals are updated to include September 16, 2026 after the match against Brazil U-20.

No.	Pos.	Player	Date of birth (age)	Caps	Goals	Club
1	GK	Caroline Birkel	August 25, 2006 (age 20)	10	0	(United States Soccer Federation) Stanford
12	GK	Evan O'Steen	March 22, 2008 (aged 17)	2	0	(United States Soccer Federation) Seattle Reign FC
21	GK	Kealey Titmuss	September 15, 2006 (age 20)	3	0	(United States Soccer Federation) Penn State
2	DF	Aven Alvarez	November 14, 2006 (age 19)	12	0	(United States Soccer Federation) North Carolina
3	DF	Emma Johnson	July 30, 2006 (age 20)	12	1	(United States Soccer Federation) Penn State
4	DF	Ella Bard	March 21, 2007 (age 19)	9	0	(United States Soccer Federation) Louisville
5	DF	Lizzie Boamah	January 29, 2006 (age 20)	9	0	(United States Soccer Federation) Stanford
13	DF	Katie Scott	June 20, 2007 (age 19)	14	1	(United States Soccer Federation) Kansas City Current
14	DF	Hope Munson	July 18, 2006 (age 20)	8	0	(United States Soccer Federation) North Carolina
15	DF	Pearl Cecil	January 24, 2008 (age 18)	1	0	(United States Soccer Federation) Virginia
6	MF	Ainsley McCammon	August 16, 2007 (age 19)	9	2	(United States Soccer Federation) Seattle Reign
8	MF	Kennedy Fuller	March 9, 2007 (age 19)	9	4	(United States Soccer Federation) Bay FC
10	MF	Linda Ullmark	April 21, 2006 (age 20)	10	7	(United States Soccer Federation) Houston Dash
16	MF	Y-Lan Nguyen	June 2, 2007 (age 19)	7	0	(United States Soccer Federation) Stanford
18	MF	Nyanya Touray	July 25, 2008 (age 18)	7	0	(United States Soccer Federation) Florida State Seminoles
20	MF	Lily Joseph	August 15, 2006 (age 20)	4	1	(United States Soccer Federation) Notre Dame
7	FW	Audrey McKeen	November 26, 2008 (age 17)	4	0	(United States Soccer Federation) Racing Louisville FC
9	MF	Alex Buck	February 14, 2006 (age 20)	6	7	(United States Soccer Federation) Washington
11	FW	Emeri Adames	April 3, 2006 (age 20)	19	3	(United States Soccer Federation) Seattle Reign
17	FW	Micayla Johnson	January 18, 2008 (age 18)	11	4	(United States Soccer Federation) Chicago Stars FC
19	FW	Sealey Strawn	October 1, 2007 (age 19)	10	2	(United States Soccer Federation) Dallas Trinity

=== Recent call-ups ===
The following players were named to a squad in the last 12 months.

- June 2026 friendlies.
- April 2026 friendlies.
- February/March 2026 training camp.
- November/December 2025 training camp and friendlies.

Pos.	Player	Date of birth (age)	Caps	Goals	Club	Latest call-up
GK	Kate Ockene	December 7, 2007 (age 18)	0	0	(United States) Florida State	April 2026 friendlies
GK	Charlotte Burge	April 4, 2006 (age 20)	1	0	(United States) Carolina Ascent	November/December 2025 friendlies
DF	Zoe Matthews	May 25, 2007 (age 19)	3	0		June 2026 friendlies
DF	Jaida McGrew	June 3, 2007 (age 19)	1	0	(United States) Florida State	June 2026 friendlies
DF	Kiara Gilmore	February 11, 2007 (age 19)	2	0	(United States) Wisconsin	June 2026 friendlies
DF	Jordyn Bugg	August 11, 2006 (age 20)	11	1	(United States) Seattle Reign	April 2026 friendlies
DF	Abby Gemma	January 12, 2006 (age 20)	3	0	(United States) Florida	April 2026 friendlies
DF	Kieryn Jeter	May 23, 2006 (age 20)	2	0	(United States) Georgia	February/March 2026 training camp
DF	Bella Ayscue	August 2, 2006 (age 20)	2	0	(United States) Penn State	February/March 2026 training camp
DF	Paloma Daubert	February 15, 2007 (age 19)	0	0	(United States) UCLA	February/March 2026 training camp
DF	Edra Bello	June 8, 2007 (age 19)	5	0	(United States) USC	November/December 2025 friendlies
MF	Peyton McGovern	July 5, 2006 (age 20)	3	1	(United States) Florida State	June 2026 friendlies
MF	Sofia Cedeño	August 10, 2006 (age 20)	5	0	(United States) Seattle Reign	June 2026 friendlies
MF	Keira Kemmerley	March 9, 2007 (age 19)	1	0	(United States) Northwestern	June 2026 friendlies
MF	Addison Halpern	May 12, 2006 (age 20)	1	0	(United States) Virginia	June 2026 friendlies
MF	Ines Derrien		2	0	(United States) USC Trojans	November/December 2025 friendlies
MF	Kai Tsakiris		2	0	(United States) Florida	November/December 2025 friendlies
MF	Onyeka Gamero	February 23, 2006 (age 20)	5	0	(United States) Bay FC	June 2026 friendlies
MF	Kylie Maxwell	July 1, 2007 (age 19)	1	0	(United States) Wake Forest	June 2026 friendlies
FW	Kimmi Ascanio	January 21, 2008 (age 18)	2	1	(United States) San Diego Wave	June 2026 friendlies
FW	Melanie Barcenas	October 30, 2007 (age 19)	2	1	(United States) San Diego Wave FC	June 2026 friendlies
FW	Izzy Engle	July 20, 2006 (age 20)	4	1	(United States) Notre Dame	April 2026 friendlies
FW	Alex Pfeiffer	November 26, 2007 (age 18)	3	2	(United States) Bay FC	April 2026 friendlies
FW	Chloe Ricketts	May 23, 2007 (age 19)	6	0	(United States) Boston Legacy	April 2026 friendlies
FW	Mary Long	January 24, 2007 (age 19)	5	4	(United States) Kansas City Current	November/December 2025 friendlies
FW	Amalia Villarreal		2	0	(United States) Texas	November/December 2025 friendlies
FW	Rylee McLanahan		1	0	(United States) Solar FC	November/December 2025 friendlies

=== Player records ===
International match statistics, as of August 12, 2014. All goals scored in international matches only.

==== Top scorers ====
Rank	Player	Goals	Years
1	Kelly Schmedes	31	2001–2002
2	Lindsey Horan	24	2011–2014
2	Sydney Leroux	24	2008–2010
2	Kelley O'Hara	24	2006–2008
2	Lindsay Tarpley	24	2001–2002
6	Kerri Hanks	22	2002–2004
7	Heather O'Reilly	18	2001–2002
8	Maya Hayes	16	2010–2012
9	Lauren Cheney	15	2006–2007
10	Ally Sentnor	13	2022–2024

==== Most capped players ====
Rank	Player	Caps	Years
1	Maya Hayes	43	2010–2012
2	Crystal Dunn	39	2010–2012
2	Ashlyn Harris	39	2002–2004
2	Sydney Leroux	39	2008–2010
5	Samantha Mewis	38	2010–2012
6	Kelley O'Hara	35	2006–2008
7	Cari Roccaro	34	2011–2014
8	Kerri Hanks	30	2002–2004
9	Christine Nairn	28	2008–2010
10	Lindsey Horan	26	2011–2014
10	Teresa Noyola	26	2007–2010
10	Lindsay Tarpley	26	2001–2002

Players still eligible for the U-20 player pool in bold.

== Coaches ==
- (United States) Shannon Higgins-Cirovski (1998–1999)
- (United States) Jay Hoffman (1999)
- (United States) Steve Swanson (2000)
- (United States) Tracey Leone (2001–2004)
- (United States) Mark Krikorian (2004–2005)
- (United States) Tim Schulz (2005–2006)
- (England) Jill Ellis (2007)
- (United States) Tony DiCicco (2008)
- (England) Jill Ellis (2009–2010)
- (United States) Dave Chesler (2010–2011)
- (United States) Steve Swanson (2011–2012)
- (United States) Michelle French (2013–2017)
- (Czech Republic) Jitka Klimková (2017–2019)
- (England) Mark Carr (2019)
- (England) Laura Harvey (2020–2021)
- (England) Tracey Kevins (2021–2025)
- (England) Vicky Jepson (2025–)

== Head-to-head record ==
The following table shows United States' head-to-head record in the FIFA U-20 Women's World Cup.

Opponent	Pld	W	D	L	GF	GA	GD	Win %
Argentina	2	2	0	0	7	1	+6	100.00
Australia	2	2	0	0	6	0	+6	100.00
Brazil	4	2	2	0	5	1	+4	50.00
Canada	1	1	0	0	1	0	+1	100.00
China	4	1	2	1	4	3	+1	25.00
Chinese Taipei	1	1	0	0	6	0	+6	100.00
Denmark	1	1	0	0	6	0	+6	100.00
DR Congo	1	1	0	0	2	1	+1	100.00
England	2	2	0	0	8	1	+7	100.00
France	3	2	1	0	4	0	+4	66.67
Germany	8	4	1	3	13	12	+1	50.00
Ghana	4	2	2	0	9	2	+7	50.00
Italy	1	0	0	1	1	2	−1	0.00
Japan	4	0	1	3	3	7	−4	0.00
Mexico	2	2	0	0	5	3	+2	100.00
Morocco	1	1	0	0	2	0	+2	100.00
Netherlands	2	1	0	1	2	4	−2	50.00
New Zealand	2	2	0	0	12	1	+11	100.00
Nigeria	2	1	1	0	3	1	+2	50.00
North Korea	5	2	1	2	6	6	+0	40.00
Paraguay	2	2	0	0	13	0	+13	100.00
Russia	1	1	0	0	4	1	+3	100.00
South Korea	2	2	0	0	4	0	+4	100.00
Spain	3	1	1	1	3	3	+0	33.33
Switzerland	1	1	0	0	5	0	+5	100.00
Total	61	37	12	12	134	49	+85	60.66
