= Kristine Pedersen =

Danish footballer (born 1986)

Personal information
- Full name: Krisine Dich Pedersen
- Date of birth: 27 August 1986 (age 40)
- Place of birth: Denmark
- Position: Midfielder

Senior career*
Years	Team	Apps	(Gls)
–2007	Vejle B	76	
2008–	Fortuna Hjørring	164	

International career
2002–2003	Denmark U17	15	(4)
2003–2005	Denmark U19	17	(5)
2004–2006	Denmark U21	13	(1)
2008–2012	Denmark	31	(7)

Managerial career
- Denmark U17
- 2026–: Denmark U19
- * Club domestic league appearances and goals

Kristine Pedersen is a Danish football coach and former player who played as a midfielder. Pedersen played for A-Liga sides Vejle B and Fortuna Hjørring, representing the latter in the Champions League. Pedersen earned 31 caps with the Denmark national team from 2008 to 2012.

== Managerial career ==
Pedersen became a coach following her player retirement and coached the Denmark U17 women's team. She became the Denmark U19 women's coach in 2026. She was the first female coach in Danish football history to coach a boys national team as an assistant coach to the U17s in 2024.
