= Tim Schulz =

American soccer player (born 1962)

Personal information
- Full name: Timothy Kyle Schulz
- Date of birth: March 1, 1962 (age 64)
- Place of birth: Milwaukee, Wisconsin, United States
- Height: 6 ft 1 in (1.85 m)
- Position: Midfielder

Senior career*
Years	Team	Apps	(Gls)
1980–1982	San Jose Earthquakes	4	(0)
1981–1982	San Jose Earthquakes (indoor)	12	(4)
1982–1983	Denver Avalanche (indoor)	7	(0)
1983–1984	Golden Bay Earthquakes	16	(0)
1983–1984	Golden Bay Earthquakes (indoor)	28	(1)
1984–1985	St. Louis Steamers (indoor)	45	(2)
1985	San Jose Earthquakes		
1986	Los Angeles Heat		
1986–1988	St. Louis Steamers (indoor)	100	(10)
1990	Colorado Foxes		
1992–1993	Denver Thunder (indoor)	18	(2)

Managerial career
- 2005–2006: U.S. U-20 women
- * Club domestic league appearances and goals

Tim Schulz (born March 1, 1962) is a former U.S. soccer midfielder who played two seasons in the North American Soccer League, two in the Western Soccer Alliance, two in Major Indoor Soccer League and one in the American Professional Soccer League. He was also a member of the U.S. soccer team at the 1983 Pan American Games. He coached the U.S. U-20 women's national team at the 2006 FIFA U-20 Women's World Championship.

== Player ==
Schulz was born in Milwaukee, Wisconsin. He was a Parade Magazine High School All American as a soccer player at Air Academy High School in Colorado Springs, Colorado. In 1980, the San Jose Earthquakes of the North American Soccer League drafted Schulz out of high school. He broke into the first team during the 1981 season. In the fall of 1982, he signed with the Denver Avalanche in the Major Indoor Soccer League but was back with the Earthquakes, now known as the Golden Bay Earthquakes in 1983.
When the NASL collapsed at the end of the 1984 season, he signed with the St. Louis Steamers of the MISL for the 1984–1985 season. In June 1985, he was back with the Earthquakes, now playing in the Western Soccer Alliance. In 1986, he moved to the Los Angeles Heat. He returned to the Steamers for the team's final two years in the MISL, 1986–1988. In 1990, he played a single season with the expansion Colorado Foxes in the American Professional Soccer League. In 1992, he signed with he expansion Denver Thunder in the National Professional Soccer League. He retired at the end of the season.

In 1983, he was a part of the U.S. team which finished 0-2-1 at the Pan American Games.

== Coach ==
Schulz has coached at the youth club level since the mid-1980s. In 1989, he became the director of coaching of the Colorado Rush soccer club. In 2000, he moved up to become president and CEO of the club. He was the head coach of the Region IV Olympic Development Program from 2000 to 2004 and was the assistant coach for the U.S. Under-18 Men's National Team from 1998 to 2000.

On May 5, 2005, USSF hired Schulz as the head coach of the United States U-20 women's national soccer team as it prepared for the 2006 FIFA U-20 Women's World Championship. Schulz took the team to a fourth-place finish in the tournament.

Tim currently serves as a State and USSF National Instructor. He holds a USSF National “A” license, a NSCAA National Advanced license, and a National Youth license.

== Football Administrator ==
Tim is the Founder of Rush in 1991 and has been with the club since. He currently is acting General Manager of Penn FC a USL professional team and Rush Soccer first team.

During his tenure, Rush grew from 1,300 players to 34,000 players representing players from 48 states and 32 countries.
