= Kelly (footballer, born 1985) =

Brazilian footballer

Personal information
- Full name: Kelly Cristina Pereira da Silva
- Date of birth: 15 May 1985 (age 41)
- Place of birth: São Gonçalo, Rio de Janeiro, Brazil
- Height: 1.64 m (5 ft 5 in)
- Position: Forward

Team information
- Current team: Fluminense
- Number: 8

Senior career*
| Years | Team | Apps | (Gls) |
| 1997–2001 | Vasco da Gama | | |
| 2003–2014 | CEPE-Caxias | | |
| 2016 | Flamengo | 0 | (0) |
| 2017 | America-RJ | | |
| 2019– | Fluminense | | |

International career^{‡}
| 2003–2004 | Brazil | | |
- * Club domestic league appearances and goals ‡ National team caps and goals as of 29 September 2003

Kelly Cristina Pereira da Silva (born 15 May 1985), commonly known as Kelly, is a Brazilian women's international footballer who plays as a forward. She was a member of the Brazil women's national football team. She was part of the team at the 2003 FIFA Women's World Cup.

== Club career ==
Kelly played for CR Vasco da Gama, but was left without a club when they folded in 2001. She trained on her own for a period before joining Petrobras in mid-2003.

== International career ==
=== Youth ===
Kelly played for Brazil women's national under-20 football team at the 2002 and 2004 editions of the FIFA U-20 Women's World Cup.

=== Senior ===
At the 2004 Athens Olympics, Kelly was part of Brazil's silver medal-winning squad. She appeared briefly as a substitute for Rosana in the 2–0 Group G defeat by the United States, but had to be substituted herself 12 minutes later after breaking her collarbone.
