= Cecilie Pedersen (Danish footballer) =

Danish footballer (born 1983)

Personal information
- Full name: Cecilie Vedel Pedersen
- Date of birth: 19 March 1983 (age 43)
- Place of birth: Denmark
- Position: Midfielder

Youth career
- Hvidovre IF

Senior career*
Years	Team	Apps	(Gls)
2000–2006	Brøndby IF	74	(9)

International career^{‡}
1999–2000	Denmark U-17	13	(1)
2000–2002	Denmark U-19	25	(3)
2002–2005	Denmark	12	(0)
- * Club domestic league appearances and goals as of 18:29, 29 November 2018 (UTC) ‡ National team caps and goals as of 18:29, 29 November 2018 (UTC)

Cecilie Vedel Pedersen (born 19 March 1983) is a Danish former footballer. She played for Elitedivisionen club Brøndby IF and also represented the Denmark national team.

== Club career ==
Pedersen made a total of 89 appearances for Brøndby between 2000 and 2006, scoring nine goals. She was part of the Brøndby team which reached the 2003–04 UEFA Women's Cup semi-finals.

== International career ==
Pedersen represented Denmark at the 2002 FIFA U-19 Women's World Championship in Canada. She made her debut for the senior Denmark women's national football team in October 2002; a 2–0 defeat by Germany in Ulm. She was named in national coach Peter Bonde's squad for UEFA Women's Euro 2005, where Denmark were eliminated at the group stage.

== Personal life ==
After injury ended Pedersen's football career, she began a relationship with her Indian yoga instructor Rahul Alinje. In December 2015 they were married in Manmad, India, in a traditional Marathi Buddhist ceremony.
