= Katie Thorlakson =

Canadian soccer player

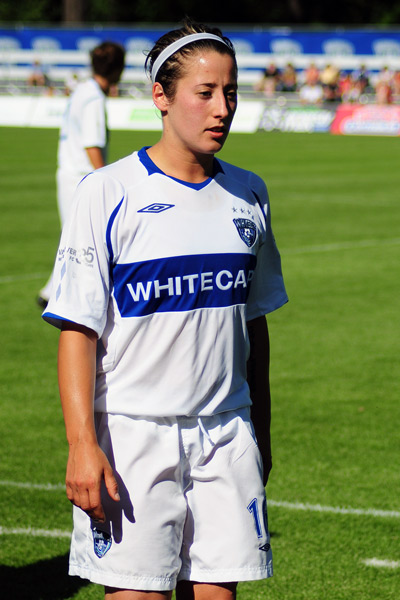

Personal information
- Full name: Katie Marie Thorlakson
- Date of birth: January 14, 1985 (age 41)
- Place of birth: New Westminster, British Columbia, Canada
- Height: 1.60 m (5 ft 3 in)
- Position: Forward

College career
Years	Team	Apps	(Gls)
2002–2005	Notre Dame Fighting Irish	95	(55)

Senior career*
Years	Team	Apps	(Gls)
2003–2009	Vancouver Whitecaps	26	(9)
2009–2010	Melbourne Victory	9	(2)

International career
2002	Canada U-19		
2004–2007	Canada	23	(2)
Medal record
Women's soccer
Representing Canada
Pan American Games
Silver medal – second place	2003 Santo Domingo	Team
Bronze medal – third place	2007 Rio de Janeiro	Team
- * Club domestic league appearances and goals

Katie Marie Thorlakson (born January 14, 1985, in New Westminster, British Columbia) is a Canadian retired soccer forward, who last played for Melbourne Victory FC. Thorlakson won two medals with the Canadian women's national soccer team at the Pan American Games in 2003 and 2007. She played collegiately soccer for the University of Notre Dame women's soccer team, where she recorded 73 assists, second most in school history. In 2004, she won the Soccer America Player of the Year Award, awarded to the best player in collegiate soccer for that year.

== Playing career ==
=== Club career ===
Thorlakson was signed by Vancouver Whitecaps FC in 2003, but only played handful of games in next two seasons due to commitments to Notre Dame. She would later join the Whitecaps halfway through the 2005 season. In the summer of 2006, she tore her ACL, MCL and meniscus in her right knee.

=== International career ===
Thorlakson played in all six matches for the Canada under-19 team at the 2002 FIFA U-19 Women's World Championship, who lost in the final to the United States. At 19 years old, Thorlakson made her debut for the national team on July 30, 2004, against Japan. She scored her only two goals for Canada in an 11–1 win over Jamaica at the 2007 Pan American Games. Thorlakson was selected to the national team for the 2007 FIFA Women's World Cup, playing once in a 4–0 win over Ghana.

== Honours ==
=== Club ===
Vancouver Whitecaps FC

- W-League (1): 2004

=== International ===
Canada

- CONCACAF Women's U-20 Championship (1): 2004
- Pan American Games: Silver (2003), Bronze (2007)

=== Individual ===
- Soccer America Player of the Year Award (1): 2004
