= Isabell Bachor =

German footballer (born 1983)

Personal information
- Date of birth: 10 July 1983 (age 43)
- Place of birth: Trier, West Germany
- Height: 1.71 m (5 ft 7 1/2 in)
- Position: Midfielder

Senior career*
Years	Team	Apps	(Gls)
2000–2003	FSV Frankfurt	33	(18)
2003–2009	SC 07 Bad Neuenahr	130	(59)
2009–2013	Bayern Munich	72	(11)
2013–2021	LSK Kvinner FK	164	(14)

International career
2002	Germany U-19		
2001–2009	Germany	30	(3)
Medal record
Women's football
Representing Germany
Olympic Games
Bronze medal – third place	2004 Athens	Team
- * Club domestic league appearances and goals

Isabell Bachor (born 10 July 1983) is a former German footballer who last played for LSK Kvinner FK in the Toppserien. She was active in the Germany women's national football team from 2001 to 2009.

== Playing career ==
=== Domestic football ===
She began her career in SV Erbach, and eventually settled at FSV Frankfurt in 2000. In 2003, she moved to SC 07 Bad Neuenahr. After the 2008–09 season she left Bad Neuenahr, signing a contract at Bayern Munich.

=== International football ===
Her international debut occurred on 6 March 2001 against China. With Germany, they won the bronze medal at the 2004 Summer Olympics in Athens. Bachor also played for Germany at the 2002 FIFA U-20 Women's World Championship. She played for Germany 30 times.

=== LSK Kvinner FK ===
In 2015 LSK Kvinner FK won "the double". She is now coach for Fjellhamar Girls 2003–02 in Norway.

== International goals ==
No.	Date	Venue	Opponent	Score	Result	Competition
1.	28 April 2004	Oldenburg, Germany	Ukraine	2–0	6–0	UEFA Women's Euro 2005 qualifying
2.	23 August 2004	Heraklio, Greece	United States	1–1	1–2 (a.e.t.)	2004 Summer Olympics
3.	3 August 2006	Krefeld, Germany	Italy	4–0	5–0	Friendly
