= Claire Morel =

French footballer (born 1984)

Personal information
- Date of birth: 14 February 1984 (age 42)
- Place of birth: Senlis, France
- Height: 1.77 m (5 ft 10 in)
- Position: Striker

Senior career*
| Years | Team | Apps | (Gls) |
| 2000–2002 | Compiègne | | |
| 2002–2003 | Clairefontaine | | |
| 2003–2006 | Lyon | 52 | (25) |
| 2006–2009 | Soyaux | 36 | (9) |
| 2009– | Champniers | | |

International career
| 2002 | France U-19 | | |
| 2004 | France | 3 | (0) |
- * Club domestic league appearances and goals

Claire Morel (born 14 February 1984) is a French football striker currently playing for ES Champniers in 4th-tier Division Honneur's Centre-Ouest group. She previously played for US Compiègne, CNFE Clairefontaine, Olympique Lyonnais and ASJ Soyaux in the French First Division.

She was the championship's top scorer with 18 goals in her debut season with Olympique Lyonnais in 2004, which earned her a call-up for the France national team. As an Under-19 international she played the 2002 U-19 World Championship.
