= Jill Oakes =

American soccer player (born 1984)

Personal information
- Full name: Jill Pauline Oakes
- Date of birth: July 18, 1984 (age 42)
- Place of birth: Tarzana, California, United States
- Height: 5 ft 7 in (1.70 m)
- Position: Midfielder

College career
Years	Team	Apps	(Gls)
2002–2005	UCLA Bruins		

Senior career*
Years	Team	Apps	(Gls)
2006	New Jersey Wildcats	9	(0)
2007	Falköpings KIK		
2007	Vancouver Whitecaps	12	(0)
2008	Pali Blues	12	(1)
2009	Chicago Red Stars	15	(0)

International career^{‡}
	United States U-19	20	(5)
- United States U-21
2005	United States	1	(0)
- * Club domestic league appearances and goals as of 22:57, September 17, 2009 (UTC) ‡ National team caps and goals as of 22:57, September 17, 2009 (UTC)

Jill Pauline Oakes (born July 18, 1984) is an American former soccer defender who last played for Chicago Red Stars of Women's Professional Soccer.

Oakes was originally drafted by FC Gold Pride 2nd overall in the 2008 WPS General Draft. She was unable to make the Pride's final roster and was cut before she ever made a regular season appearance for the club. She was subsequently signed by Chicago Red Stars for the 2009 season.

She has been married to former UCLA Bruin and NBA point guard Jordan Farmar since July 29, 2012.
