= Clare Rustad =

Canadian soccer player

Personal information
- Full name: Clare Ada Rustad
- Date of birth: May 27, 1983 (age 43)
- Place of birth: North Vancouver, British Columbia, Canada
- Height: 1.78 m (5 ft 10 in)
- Positions: Midfielder; defender

College career
| Years | Team | Apps | (Gls) |
| 2001–2004 | Washington Huskies | | |

Senior career*
| Years | Team | Apps | (Gls) |
| 2003–2005 | Vancouver Whitecaps FC | 19 | (0) |
| 2007 | Vancouver Whitecaps FC | 12 | (0) |
| 2009–2010 | Toronto Lady Lynx | 14 | (2) |

International career
| 2002 | Canada U-19 | 6 | (1) |
| 2000–2008 | Canada | 45 | (3) |
- * Club domestic league appearances and goals

Clare Ada Rustad (born May 27, 1983) is a Canadian broadcaster and former soccer midfielder. Her last club was the Toronto Lady Lynx in 2010. She played for Canada women's national soccer team between 2000 and 2008, making 45 appearances and scoring three goals.

== Playing career ==
=== Club ===
Rustad played collegiate soccer for the University of Washington between 2001 and 2004, and professionally for Vancouver Whitecaps FC. She is a distinguished alumnus of Gordon Head Soccer Association.

=== International ===
Rustad competed for the Canada national under-19 soccer team at the 2002 FIFA U-19 Women's World Championship, winning the silver medal. She made her international debut for Canada on June 26, 2000 against China in the 2000 CONCACAF Women's Gold Cup. Rustad scored her first goal for the senior team on September 4, 2003 in a 6-0 friendly win over Mexico. She last represented Canada at the 2008 Olympics in Beijing, reaching the quarterfinals and retiring from international football afterwards.

== Broadcasting career ==
Rustad has served as a soccer analyst on CBC, TSN and Sportsnet for events including the Pan Am Games, the FIFA Women's World Cup, the 2020 Tokyo Olympics, and the 2026 FIFA Men's World Cup. Rustad was the colour commentator at the 2024 Paris Olympics for the CBC.

== Personal life ==
Rustad grew up on Saltspring Island in British Columbia. She began medical school at the University of Toronto in 2008 and graduated in 2012. She has a molecular biology degree from the University of Washington and a master's degree in epidemiology from the University of Cambridge. Dr. Rustad is currently a family doctor on Saltspring Island. In March 2013, Rustad joined the National Organizing Committee for the 2015 FIFA Women's World Cup held in Canada.

== Honours ==
- Brian Budd Award: 2023
- BC Soccer Hall of Fame: 2022
