= Kelly Schmedes =

American soccer player (born 1983)

Personal information
- Full name: Kelly Lynn Schmedes
- Birth name: Kelly Lynn Wilson
- Date of birth: February 11, 1983 (age 43)
- Place of birth: Odessa, Texas, United States
- Height: 5 ft 6 in (1.68 m)
- Position: Forward

College career
Years	Team	Apps	(Gls)
2001–2004	Texas Longhorns		

Senior career*
Years	Team	Apps	(Gls)
2005	Charlotte Lady Eagles	8	(11)
2006	KIF Örebro DFF		
2007–2008	Charlotte Lady Eagles	25	(21)
2009	Boston Breakers	17	(1)

International career
2001–2002	United States U-19		(31)
2002–2005	United States U-21		
2002–2005	United States	4	(1)
- * Club domestic league appearances and goals

Kelly Lynn Schmedes (née Wilson; born February 11, 1983) is an American retired soccer forward who last played for Boston Breakers of Women's Professional Soccer, and was a member of the United States women's national soccer team.

== Playing career ==
=== Early life and university ===
Schmedes was born in Odessa, Texas. There she attended Permian High School. She was recruited by, and eventually enrolled in, the University of Texas at Austin. While there, Schmedes played for the Texas Longhorns women's soccer team. She was a four-time All-Big 12 First Team selection, in addition to being a three-time Hermann Trophy nominee and two-time NSCAA All-American. At the conclusion of her career with Texas, Schmedes was the all-time leader in points (129), assists (41), game-winning goals (13) and games started (84) for the university.

=== Professional club ===
After graduating from Texas, Schmedes played for W-League side Charlotte Lady Eagles in 2005. She appeared in 8 games (679 minutes) and scored 11 goals with an assist.

Her stay in the United States was short lived as Schmedes moved abroad to play for Sweden's KIF Örebro DFF in 2006.

2007 saw Schmedes return to Charlotte Lady Eagles, where she appeared in a further 12 games (903 minutes), and tallied 7 goals and 6 assists. 2008 saw more of the same with Schmedes playing in 13 games (1149 minutes). She scored 14 goals with 6 assists. Throughout her three years with the club, Schmedes ranks 3rd in goals and 4th in assists.

With the return of top-flight women's soccer in the United States in Women's Professional Soccer, teams were keen to obtain Schmedes' playing rights. She was selected in the 6th round of the 2009 WPS Draft by Boston Breakers. In the inaugural 2009 Women's Professional Soccer season, she appeared in 17 games (10 starts, 1033 total minutes) and scored 1 goal and 1 assist.

Following the conclusion of the 2009 season, Schmedes was drafted by expansion club Philadelphia Independence in the 2009 WPS Expansion Draft but did not make the final roster.

=== International ===
Schmedes is the all-time leader in international goals scored (31) for the United States U-20 women's national soccer team. As Kelly Wilson, she scored nine goals in five games at the 2002 FIFA U-19 Women's World Championship in Canada, becoming the second-highest scoring player in the tournament and winning the Bronze Ball and Silver Shoe awards.

Schmedes has only appeared twice for the United States national team, at the 2002 and 2005 Algarve Cups, scoring her only international goal against England in 2002.

==== International goals ====
Key (expand for notes on "international goals" and sorting)
Location	Geographic location of the venue where the competition occurred Sorted by country name first, then by city name
Lineup	Start – played entire match on minute (off player) – substituted on at the minute indicated, and player was substituted off at the same time off minute (on player) – substituted off at the minute indicated, and player was substituted on at the same time (c) – captain Sorted by minutes played
Goal in match	Goal of total goals by the player in the match Sorted by total goals followed by goal number
#	NumberOfGoals.goalNumber scored by the player in the match (alternate notation to Goal in match)
Min	The minute in the match the goal was scored. For list that include caps, blank indicates played in the match but did not score a goal.
Assist/pass	The ball was passed by the player, which assisted in scoring the goal. This column depends on the availability and source of this information.
penalty or pk	Goal scored on penalty-kick which was awarded due to foul by opponent. (Goals scored in penalty-shoot-out, at the end of a tied match after extra-time, are not included.)
Score	The match score after the goal was scored. Sorted by goal difference, then by goal scored by the player's team
Result	The final score. Sorted by goal difference in the match, then by goal difference in penalty-shoot-out if it is taken, followed by goal scored by the player's team in the match, then by goal scored in the penalty-shoot-out. For matches with identical final scores, match ending in extra-time without penalty-shoot-out is a tougher match, therefore precede matches that ended in regulation
aet	The score at the end of extra-time; the match was tied at the end of 90' regulation
pso	Penalty-shoot-out score shown in parentheses; the match was tied at the end of extra-time
	Yellow background color – match at an invitational tournament
NOTE: some keys may not apply for a particular football player

Date	Location	Opponent	Lineup	Min	Assist/pass	Score	Result	Competition
2002-03-03	(Portugal) Ferreiras	England	on 46' (off Fotopoulos)	75	Aly Wagner	2–0	2–0	Algarve Cup
