= Paulo Gonçalves (football manager) =

Brazilian football manager (born 1936)

Personal information
- Date of birth: 18 November 1936 (age 89)

Managerial career
- Years: Team
- 2001–2003: Brazil Women

Paulo Gonçalves (born 18 November 1936) is a Brazilian football manager.

== Career ==
Gonçalves was the head coach of the Brazil women's national team at the 2003 FIFA Women's World Cup.
