= Marie Herping =

Danish footballer (born 1984)

Personal information
- Full name: Marie Stentoft-Herping
- Date of birth: 18 March 1984 (age 42)
- Place of birth: Denmark
- Position: Striker

Senior career*
Years	Team	Apps	(Gls)
–2003	OB Odense		
2003–2008	Fortuna Hjørring		

International career^{‡}
2002	Denmark U-19		
2003–2008	Denmark	17	(0)
- * Club domestic league appearances and goals ‡ National team caps and goals as of 10:21, 18 October 2016 (UTC)

Marie Herping (born 18 March 1984) is a Danish former football striker who played for OB Odense, Fortuna Hjørring and the Danish national team.
