= Katy Ward =

English footballer (born 1984)

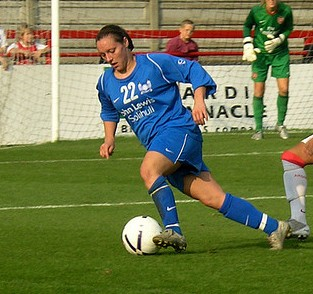

Personal information
- Date of birth: 5 January 1984 (age 42)
- Place of birth: Yardley, England
- Position: Left-back

Senior career*
| Years | Team | Apps | (Gls) |
| 1995–1998 | Aston Villa | | |
| 1998–2001 | Wolves | | |
| 2001–2005 | Birmingham City | | |
| 2005–2006 | Bristol Academy | | |
| 2006–2009 | Birmingham City | | |
| 2009–2010 | Blackburn Rovers | 5 | (1) |
| 2010–? | Coventry City | | |
- * Club domestic league appearances and goals as of 16:30, 28 October 2009 (UTC)

Katy Ward (born 5 January 1984) is an English former footballer who played as left-back. She last played for Coventry City.

== Club career ==
Ward played for Wolves and Aston Villa before joining Birmingham City. In March 2004, she suffered torn ankle ligaments, a broken fibula and a cracked tibia early in Birmingham's FA Women's Cup semi-final defeat to Charlton Athletic Ladies. She spent the 2005–06 season with Bristol Academy before returning to Birmingham City in the later part of the 2006 season. She left for Blackburn Rovers in July 2009 and scored on the opening day of the 2009–10 season in a 1–1 draw with Doncaster Rovers Belles.

== International career ==
Ward has represented England at Under-16, 18 and 19 levels.

== Personal life ==
Ward is a former pupil of Cockshut Hill School. Ward works as a teacher at Kings Heath Boys School in Birmingham.

== Statistics ==
| Club | Season | League | | WFA Cup | | Premier League Cup | | County Cup | | Other | | Total | |
| Club | Season | Apps | Goals | Apps | Goals | Apps | Goals | Apps | Goals | Apps | Goals | Apps | Goals |
|---|---|---|---|---|---|---|---|---|---|---|---|---|---|
| Birmingham City Ladies | 2002–03 | | 3 | | | | | | | | | | |
| Birmingham City Ladies | 2003–04 | | 2 | | | | | | | | | | |
| Birmingham City Ladies | 2004–05 | | 0 | | | | | | | | | | |
| Birmingham City Ladies | Club Total | | | | | | | | | | | | |
| Bristol Academy | 2005–06 | | | | | | | | | | | | |
| Bristol Academy | Club Total | | | | | | | | | | | | |
| Birmingham City Ladies | 2006–07 | | | | | | | | | | | | |
| Birmingham City Ladies | 2007–08 | | | | | | | | | | | | |
| Birmingham City Ladies | 2008–09 | | | | | | | | | | | | |
| Birmingham City Ladies | Club Total | | | | | | | | | | | | |
| Blackburn Rovers Ladies | 2009–10 | 5 | 1 | 0 | 0 | 1 | 0 | 1 | 0 | 0 | 0 | 7 | 1 |
| Blackburn Rovers Ladies | Club Total | 5 | 1 | 0 | 0 | 1 | 0 | 1 | 0 | 0 | 0 | 7 | 1 |
