= Élodie Ramos =

French footballer (born 1983)

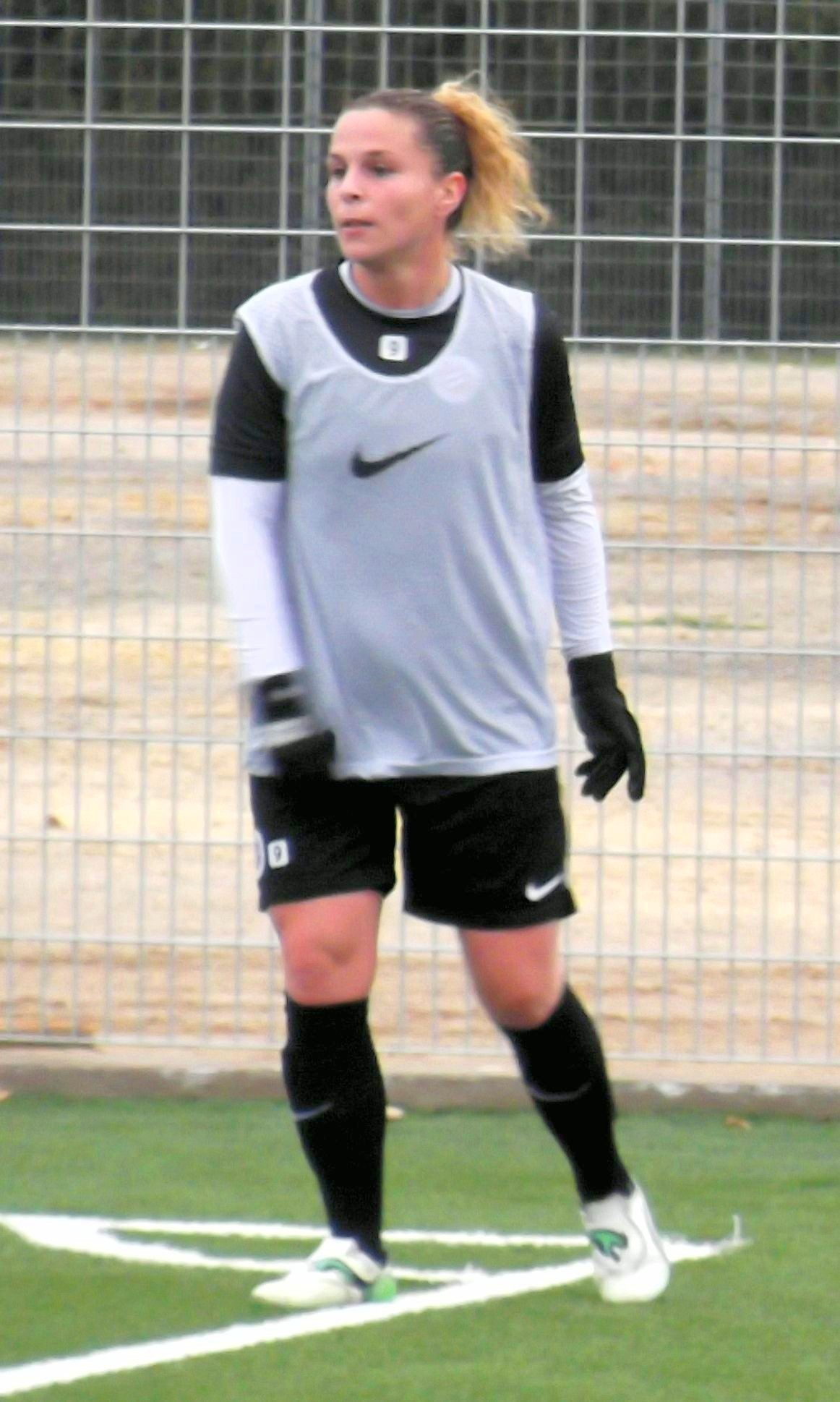
- Ramos in 2014

Personal information
- Full name: Élodie Ramos
- Date of birth: 13 March 1983 (age 43)
- Place of birth: Aix en Provence, France
- Height: 5 ft 2 in (1.57 m)
- Position: Striker

Team information
- Current team: Nîmes
- Number: 9

Youth career
- 1988–1997: USM Meyreuil
- 1997–2000: Celtic Marseille

Senior career*
Years	Team	Apps	(Gls)
2000–2001	Celtic Marseille		
2001–2002	Schiltigheim	16	(13)
2002–2014	Montpellier	189	(107)
2014	Nîmes	47	(28)

International career^{‡}
2002	France U-19		
2002–	France	9	(1)
- * Club domestic league appearances and goals as of 26 November 2009 (UTC) ‡ National team caps and goals as of 26 November 2009 (UTC)

Élodie Ramos (born 13 March 1983) is a French football player currently playing for Montpellier HSC of the Division 1 Féminine. Ramos plays as a striker and is currently one of the longest-serving players at the club, whom she joined in 2002.

== Career ==
Ramos began her career at her hometown club USM Meyreuil in the commune of Meyreuil. After spending nine years at the club, she moved to nearby Marseille joining Celtic Marseille. After spending a few years in the club's youth system, she played one season on the senior team before moving north to the Alsace region joining SC Schiltigheim. In her only season with Schiltigheim, she scored 13 goals. Following a successful season, Ramos joined Montpellier. With Montpellier, she became an instant hit becoming one of the club's most decorated players having won the D1 Féminine on two occasions (2004 and 2005), as well as the Challenge de France in 2009. In her eight seasons with Montpellier, Ramos has scored double-digit goals in six and has only collected three yellow cards.

== International career ==
Ramos made her international debut on 22 February 2002 against China. She scored her only international goal to date on 14 March 2007 in a 1–3 loss to Sweden at the Algarve Cup.
