= Michelle Hickmott =

English footballer

Personal information
- Full name: Michelle Marie Hickmott
- Date of birth: 20 February 1985 (age 41)
- Place of birth: England
- Height: 5 ft 0 in (1.52 m)
- Position: Left-back

Senior career*
Years	Team	Apps	(Gls)
–2003	Birmingham City Ladies		
2003–2004	Fulham		
2004–2005	Coventry		
2005–2007	Charlton		
2007–2010	Birmingham City		
2010–2011	Coventry		

International career
2002	England U19		
2007–2008	England U23		
2009	England	1	(0)
- * Club domestic league appearances and goals

Michelle Marie Hickmott (born 20 February 1985) is an English football full-back. She most recently played club football for Coventry City Ladies and has represented England at senior international level.

== Club career ==
Hickmott's first experience of team football came after a successful trial as a 13-year-old with Birmingham City Ladies. After just one season in the under-14s team, then manager Marcus Bignot promoted Hickmott to the senior side, with her debut coming against Garswood Saints in the Midland Combination.

Although initially a midfielder, Bignot switched Hickmott to left-back and she was a regular in the side that won first the Midland Combination and then the FAWPL Northern Division, and with it promotion to the FA Women's Premier League. She remained with Birmingham for their first season of Premier League football, including an appearance in the League Cup finalist side. In September 2002 she joined the FA National Player Development Centre at Loughborough University.

On leaving Birmingham at the end of the 2002–2003 season, Hickmott joined Fulham Ladies, playing in Europe for Marieanne Spacey's side. Fulham had reverted to semi-professional status at the time of Hickmott's arrival, causing the departure of high-profile players such as Rachel Yankey, Rachel Unitt and Katie Chapman.

Hickmott remained with Fulham initially, but a month into the following season, left to join Northern Division Coventry Ladies, where she was employed as a coach within their centre of excellence and also worked for the Birmingham FA. With Coventry relegated back to the Midland Combination, Hickmott joined Charlton Ladies where she played in the League Cup winning side against Arsenal and was an unused substitute for their FA Cup win.

In June 2007 she returned to Birmingham Ladies.

== International career ==
Within a season of starting her career, Hickmott was selected for the England Under-14 side, quickly progressing to the Under-16 side. She went on to win 49 caps at youth level for England, captaining England in the Under-23's Nordic Cup. Hickmott's senior debut came when she replaced Corinne Yorston during a 4–1 win over Finland in Larnaca in February 2009. In June 2009, Hickmott was included in England coach Hope Powell's 30-player squad for the friendlies against Iceland and Denmark.

Hickmott was allotted 167 when the FA announced their legacy numbers scheme to honour the 50th anniversary of England’s inaugural international.

== Personal life ==
In addition to playing football, Hickmott has two decades experience working as a fire fighter. In June 2026 she is to be promoted to deputy chief of the Staffordshire Fire and Rescue Service where she has been employed since 2022. She has also served in London Fire Brigade as a borough commander in Kensington and Chelsea, as an instructor at The Fire Service College and in the Warwickshire Fire Service.

Prior to joining the fire service, she had been a coach with the Birmingham Football Association.
