= Denmark women's national under-19 football team =

National U-19 association football team

Denmark U19
- Association: Danish Football Association
- Confederation: UEFA (Europe)
- Head coach: Kristine Pedersen
- Captain: Louise Strauss
- Most caps: Nanna Christiansen (36)
- Top scorer: Camilla Høeg-Petersen (23)
- FIFA code: DEN
First colours	Second colours

UEFA Women's Under-19 Championship
- Appearances: 7 (first in 2002)
- Best result: Semi-finals (2002, 2006, 2012, 2018)

FIFA U-20 Women's World Cup
- Appearances: 1 (first in 2002)
- Best result: Quarter-finals (2002)

Denmark women's national U-19 football team is the football team representing Denmark in competitions for under-19 year old players and is controlled by the Danish Football Association.

== History ==
Kristine Pedersen was appointed as the new head coach in June 2026 following Niels Lawaetz's move to Nordsjælland. Pedersen made history as the first national team coach to go on maternity leave, with Katrine Pedersen taking over head coach duties in 2027. Denmark topped their Euro 2027 qualification group, winning their matches against England, Bosnia-Herzegovina, and Switzerland.

== Results and fixtures ==
The following is a list of match results in the last 12 months, as well as any future matches that have been scheduled.

Legend

Win Draw Loss Fixture

=== 2026 ===
3 March 2026 Exhibition match	Norway	2–0	Denmark	La Nucia, Spain
13:00 UTC+1	Ulstein 50'; Preus 69'	Report		Stadium: Estadi Olímpic Camilo Cano; Attendance: 48; Referee: Stine Jensen (Norway)

6 March 2026 Exhibition match	Denmark	3–0	Sweden	Benidorm, Spain
14:00 UTC+1	Skotte 2'; Strauss 31', 48'			Stadium: Meliá Villaitana; Attendance: 26

9 April 2026 2027 U19-Euros qualification	Denmark	1–0	Serbia	Stara Pazova, Serbia
14:00 UTC+2	Nielsen 67'	Report		Stadium: Serbian FA Sports Center; Attendance: 142; Referee: Caroline Lanssens (Belgium)

12 April 2026 2027 U19-Euros qualification	Denmark	2–3	Iceland	Stara Pazova, Serbia
11:00 UTC+2	Højer 45' (pen.); Strauss 77'	Report	Mott 19' (o.g.); Jónsdóttir 48'; Jørgensen 57' (o.g.)	Stadium: Serbian FA Sports Center; Attendance: 56; Referee: Abigail Byrne (England)

15 April 2026 2027 U19-Euros qualification	Finland	1–2	Denmark	Stara Pazova, Serbia
12:00 UTC+2	Mäkelä 25'	Report	Højer 55', 62'	Stadium: Serbian FA Sports Center; Attendance: 84; Referee: Abigail Byrne (England)

== Coaching staff ==
As of 26 June 2026

Coaching staff
Role	Name
Head Coach	(Denmark) Kristine Pedersen
Assistant Coach	(Denmark) Emilie Henriksen

== Players ==
=== Current squad ===
The following 20 players were called up for the 2027 U19 Euros qualification matches on 7, 10, and 13 October 2026 against England, Bosnia and Herzegovina, and Switzerland, respectively.

Caps and goals correct as of 13 October 2026, following the match against Switzerland.

No.	Pos.	Player	Date of birth (age)	Caps	Goals	Club
	GK	Isabella Andersen	17 March 2009 (age 17)	0	0	(Danish Football Association) Brøndby
	GK	Line Pjetursson	13 October 2009 (age 17)	0	0	(Danish Football Association) Nordsjælland
	DF	Asta Kynde	26 June 2008 (age 18)	14	1	(Danish Football Association) Kolding
	DF	Astrid Ensig-Karup	31 March 2009 (age 17)	9	0	(Danish Football Association) Nordsjælland
	DF	Evelina Thygesen	23 April 2009 (age 17)	4	0	(Danish Football Association) Brøndby
	DF	Caroline Ahle	27 July 2009 (age 17)	3	0	(Danish Football Association) AGF
	DF	Andrea Jeppesen	23 June 2009 (age 17)	3	0	(Danish Football Association) Midtjylland
	DF	Astrid Nautrup	12 May 2008 (age 18)	1	0	(Danish Football Association) Midtjylland
	DF	Matilde Jessen	25 October 2009 (age 17)	0	0	(Danish Football Association) Midtjylland
	DF	Cecilie Harsløf	19 November 2009 (age 17)	0	0	(Danish Football Association) AGF
	MF	Alberte Mott	5 May 2008 (age 18)	14	2	(Danish Football Association) Nordsjælland
	MF	Anna Pallesen	29 November 2008 (age 17)	8	0	(Danish Football Association) Fortuna Hjørring
	MF	Sofie Lundberg	1 April 2008 (age 18)	7	0	(Danish Football Association) AGF
	MF	Nellie Mulvad	10 December 2009 (age 16)	4	1	(Danish Football Association) Nordsjælland
	MF	Mille Kjærgaard	12 July 2009 (age 17)	2	1	(Danish Football Association) Midtjylland
	FW	Louise Strauss	29 April 2008 (age 18)	12	8	(Italian Football Federation) AC Milan B
	FW	Andrea Thierry	30 March 2008 (age 18)	8	1	(Danish Football Association) Kolding
	FW	Thea Petersen	30 March 2009 (age 17)	4	2	(Danish Football Association) Nordsjælland
	FW	Emma Lynnerup	6 September 2009 (age 17)	1	0	(Danish Football Association) Fortuna Hjørring
	FW	Frøya Stubgaard	16 February 2009 (age 17)	1	0	(Danish Football Association) Kolding

=== Recent call-ups ===
The following players have also been called up to the squad within the past 12 months.

Pos.	Player	Date of birth (age)	Caps	Goals	Club	Latest call-up
GK	Isabella Damm (captain)	8 April 2008 (age 18)	12	0	(England) Arsenal	v. Switzerland, 13 October 2026
DF	Sarah Vinther	18 May 2010 (age 16)	3	0	(Denmark) Nordsjælland	v. Switzerland, 13 October 2026
DF	Hannah Jørgensen	12 April 2008 (age 18)	11	0	(Denmark) Nordsjælland	v. Wales, 6 June 2026
DF	Martha Hesselholt	11 June 2008 (age 18)	7	0	(Denmark) Nordsjælland	v. Wales, 6 June 2026
MF	Mila Bischoff	1 July 2009 (age 17)	4	7	(Denmark) Brøndby	v. Switzerland, 13 October 2026
MF	Nicoline Klintskov	29 March 2010 (age 16)	3	0	(Denmark) Nordsjælland	v. Switzerland, 13 October 2026
MF	Josephine Lamp	17 March 2010 (age 16)	2	0	(Spain) Barcelona B	v. Switzerland, 13 October 2026
MF	Kamma Fredsted^{RET}	12 January 2009 (age 17)	1	0	Retired	v. Wales, 6 June 2026
MF	Nikoline Nielsen	12 August 2009 (age 17)	9	3	(Spain) Barcelona B	v. Switzerland, 13 October 2026
FW	Frederikke Ludvigsen	25 February 2010 (age 16)	3	4	(Denmark) Kolding	v. Switzerland, 13 October 2026
FW	Sophia Parkegaard	3 June 2008 (age 18)	1	1	(Denmark) AGF	v. Wales, 6 June 2026
FW	Melanie Frandsen	17 March 2008 (age 18)	1	0	(Denmark) Brøndby	v. Wales, 6 June 2026
Notes: ^{INJ} = Withdrew due to injury; ^{RET} = Retired from the national team; ^{WD} = Player withdrew from the squad due to non-injury issue

== Competitive record ==
=== FIFA U-20 Women's World Cup ===
Year	Round	Position	GP	W	D	L
(Canada) 2002	Quarter-finals	8th	4	1	0	3
(Thailand) 2004 to (Poland) 2026	Did not qualify					

=== UEFA Women's Under-19 Championship ===
Year	Round	Position	GP	W	D	L	GF	GA
1998	Unknown							
(Sweden) 1999	Unknown							
(France) 2000	Unknown							
(Norway) 2001	Unknown							
(Sweden) 2002	Semifinals	3rd	4	3	0	1	8	3
(Germany) 2003	Did not qualify							
(Finland) 2004	Did not qualify							
(Hungary) 2005	Did not qualify							
(Switzerland) 2006	Semifinals	4th	4	1	1	2	2	4
(Iceland) 2007	Group stage	6th	3	1	0	2	3	4
(France) 2008	Did not qualify							
(Belarus) 2009	Did not qualify							
(North Macedonia) 2010	Did not qualify							
(Italy) 2011	Did not qualify							
(Turkey) 2012	Semifinals	3rd	4	3	0	1	4	3
(Wales) 2013	Group stage	6th	3	1	0	2	2	6
(Norway) 2014	Did not qualify							
(Israel) 2015	Group stage	6th	3	1	0	2	2	3
(Slovakia) 2016	Did not qualify							
(Northern Ireland) 2017	Did not qualify							
(Switzerland) 2018	Semifinals	3rd	4	2	0	2	4	3
(Scotland) 2019	Did not qualify							
(Czech Republic) 2022	Did not qualify							
(Belgium) 2023	Did not qualify							
(Lithuania) 2024	Did not qualify							
(Poland) 2025	Did not qualify							
(Bosnia and Herzegovina) 2026	Did not qualify							
(Hungary) 2027	TBD							

== Head-to-head record ==
The following table shows Denmark's head-to-head record in the FIFA U-20 Women's World Cup.

Opponent	Pld	W	D	L	GF	GA	GD	Win %
Canada	1	0	0	1	2	3	−1	0.00
Japan	1	0	0	1	1	2	−1	0.00
Nigeria	1	1	0	0	2	1	+1	100.00
United States	1	0	0	1	0	6	−6	0.00
Total	4	1	0	3	5	12	−7	25.00
