= List of FIFA Women's World Cup final goalscorers =

World Cup final goalscorers

The following is a list of goalscorers in the FIFA Women's World Cup finals. Only goals scored during regulation or extra time are included. Any goals scored during the penalty shoot-out are excluded. As of the 2023 final, twenty-one individuals have scored a total of twenty-four goals in all of finals history. Two players have scored multiple goals in the finals, while Carli Lloyd is the only women's player to score a hat trick in a final. One player has done so via a penalty kick (Megan Rapinoe). Julie Johnston was the first player to score an own goal in a final. Nia Künzer's goal is the only one marked as a golden goal.

== Finals goalscorers ==
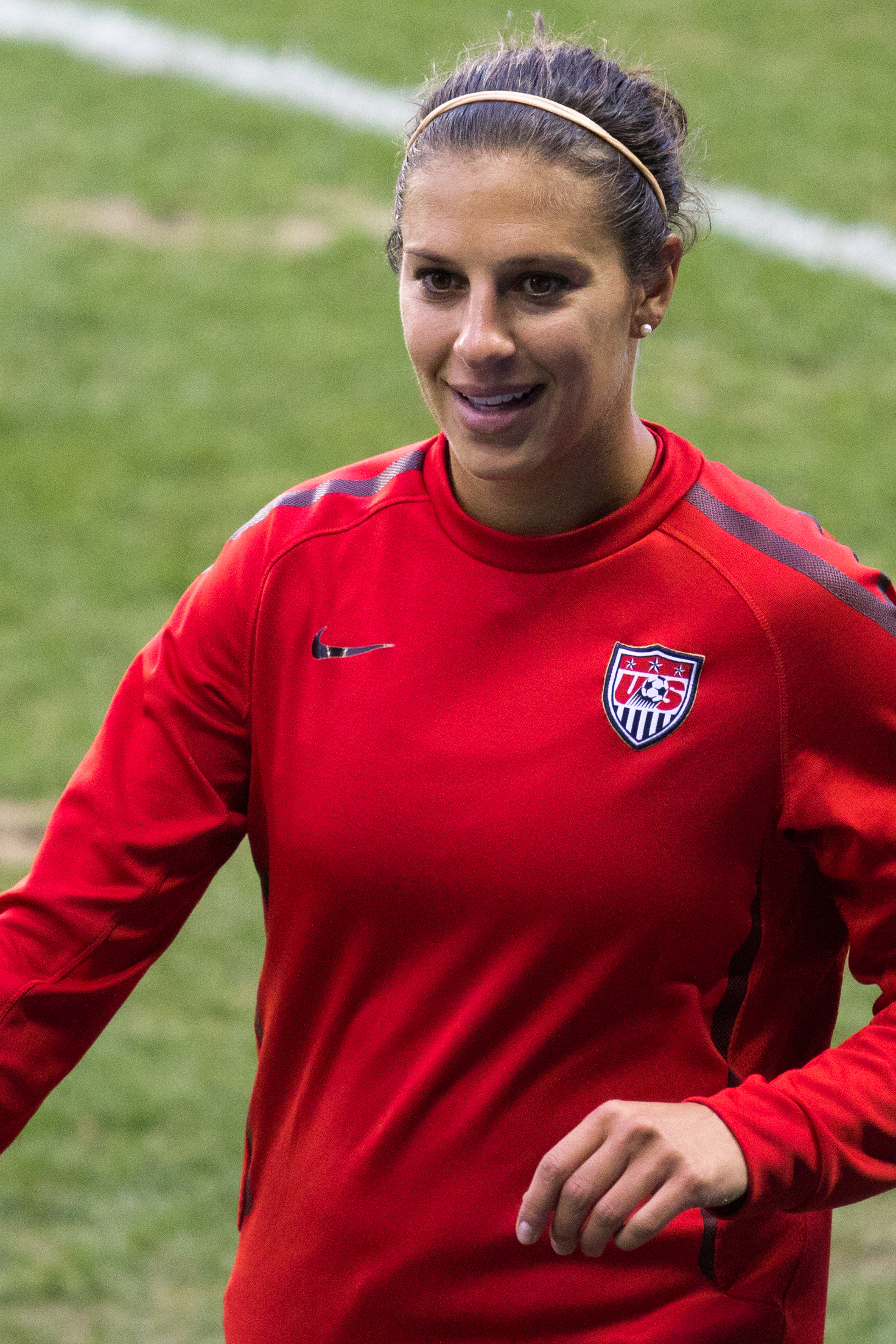
Carli Lloyd is the only female player to have scored a hat-trick in a World Cup final.

Year	Player	Team	Score	Minute	Result	Report	Ref
1991	Michelle Akers-Stahl	United States	1–0	20'	2–1	Report	
1991	Linda Medalen	Norway	1–1	29'	2–1	Report	
1991	Michelle Akers-Stahl (2)	United States	2–1	78'	2–1	Report	
1995	Hege Riise	Norway	1–0	37'	2–0	Report	
1995	Marianne Pettersen	Norway	2–0	40'	2–0	Report	
1999	No goals scored. Game decided in penalty shoot-out.					Report	
2003	Hanna Ljungberg	Sweden	1–0	20'	2–1	Report	
2003	Maren Meinert	Germany	1–1	29'	2–1	Report	
2003	Nia Künzer	Germany	2–1	98' (g.g.)	2–1	Report	
2007	Birgit Prinz	Germany	1–0	52'	2–0	Report	
2007	Simone Laudehr	Germany	2–0	86'	2–0	Report	
2011	Alex Morgan	United States	1–0	69'	2–2	Report	
2011	Aya Miyama	Japan	1–1	81'	2–2	Report	
2011	Abby Wambach	United States	2–1	104'	2–2	Report	
2011	Homare Sawa	Japan	2–2	117'	2–2	Report	
2011	Game decided in penalty shoot-out.					Report	
2015	Carli Lloyd	United States	1–0	3'	5–2	Report	
2015	Carli Lloyd (2)	United States	2–0	5'	5–2	Report	
2015	Lauren Holiday	United States	3–0	14'	5–2	Report	
2015	Carli Lloyd (3)	United States	4–0	16'	5–2	Report	
2015	Yuki Ogimi	Japan	1–4	27'	5–2	Report	
2015	Julie Johnston	Japan	2–4	52' (o.g.)	5–2	Report	
2015	Tobin Heath	United States	5–2	54'	5–2	Report	
2019	Megan Rapinoe	United States	1–0	61' (p)	2–0	Report	
2019	Rose Lavelle	United States	2–0	69'	2–0	Report	
2023	Olga Carmona	Spain	1–0	29'	1–0	Report	

== Players with most goals in the Finals ==
Players with multiple goals in FIFA Women's World Cup Finals
Player	Team	Goals scored	Finals played	Final(s)
Carli Lloyd	United States	3	3	(2011), 2015, (2019)
Michelle Akers	United States	2	2	1991, (1999)

- Parentheses indicates no goals scored
