= 2007 FIFA Women's World Cup Group A =

Football tournament group stage

Group A was one of four groups of nations competing at the 2007 FIFA Women's World Cup. The group's first round of matches began on 10 September and its last matches were played on 17 September 2007. Most matches were played at the Hongkou Stadium in Shanghai. Defending champions Germany topped the group, joined in the second round by England, the only team Germany failed to beat.

== Standings ==
Pos	Team	Pld	W	D	L	GF	GA	GD	Pts	Qualification
1	Germany	3	2	1	0	13	0	+13	7	Advance to knockout stage
2	England	3	1	2	0	8	3	+5	5	Advance to knockout stage
3	Japan	3	1	1	1	3	4	−1	4	
4	Argentina	3	0	0	3	1	18	−17	0	

Source: FIFA
Rules for classification: Group stage tiebreakers

== Matches ==
All times are local (UTC+8)

=== Germany vs Argentina ===
10 September 2007
20:00

Germany	11–0	Argentina
Behringer 12', 24'; Garefrekes 17'; Prinz 29', 45+1', 59'; Lingor 51', 90+1'; Smisek 57', 70', 79'	Report

Hongkou Football Stadium, Shanghai
Attendance: 28,098
Referee: Tammy Ogston (Australia)

Germany:
GK	1	Nadine Angerer
RB	2	Kerstin Stegemann
CB	13	Sandra Minnert
CB	17	Ariane Hingst
LB	6	Linda Bresonik
CM	14	Simone Laudehr	(yellow card) 60'	(substituted off) 74'
CM	7	Melanie Behringer		(substituted off) 68'
RW	18	Kerstin Garefrekes		(substituted off) 84'
AM	8	Sandra Smisek
LW	10	Renate Lingor
CF	9	Birgit Prinz (c)
Substitutions:
FW	20	Petra Wimbersky		(substituted on) 68'
DF	3	Saskia Bartusiak	(yellow card) 86'	(substituted on) 74'
FW	11	Anja Mittag		(substituted on) 84'
Manager:
(Germany) Silvia Neid

Argentina:
GK	12	Vanina Noemí Correa
RB	3	Valeria Cotelo
CB	2	Eva Nadia González (c)	(yellow card) 56'
CB	13	María Florencia Quiñones	(yellow card) 90+2'
LB	6	Sabrina Celeste Barbita
CM	4	Gabriela Patricia Chávez	(yellow card) 20'
CM	11	Rosana Itatí Gómez	(yellow card) 16'	(substituted off) 66'
CM	8	Clarisa Belén Huber		(substituted off) 74'
RF	17	Fabiana Gisella Vallejos
CF	18	María Belén Potassa
LF	19	Analía Soledad Almeida		(substituted off) 53'
Substitutions:
FW	7	Ludmila Manicler		(substituted on) 53'
FW	20	Mercedes Pereyra		(substituted on) 66'
MF	15	Florencia Mandrile		(substituted on) 74'
Manager:
(Argentina) José Carlos Borello

=== Japan vs England ===
11 September 2007
20:00

Japan	2–2	England
Miyama 55', 90+5'	Report	K. Smith 81', 83'

Hongkou Football Stadium, Shanghai
Attendance: 27,146
Referee: Kari Seitz (United States)

Japan:
GK	1	Miho Fukumoto
RB	3	Yukari Kinga	(substituted off) 46'
CB	2	Hiromi Isozaki (c)	(substituted off) 86'
CB	15	Azusa Iwashimizu
LB	20	Rumi Utsugi
DM	7	Tomomi Miyamoto	(substituted off) 71'
RM	8	Tomoe Sakai
LM	16	Aya Miyama
AM	10	Homare Sawa
CF	9	Eriko Arakawa
CF	18	Shinobu Ohno
Substitutions:
DF	13	Kozue Ando	(substituted on) 46'
MF	6	Ayumi Hara	(substituted on) 71'
FW	17	Yuki Nagasato	(substituted on) 86'
Manager:
(Japan) Hiroshi Ohashi

England:
GK	1	Rachel Brown
DF	2	Alex Scott		(substituted off) 89'
DF	3	Casey Stoney
DF	5	Faye White (c)
DF	6	Mary Phillip
MF	4	Katie Chapman	(yellow card) 23'
MF	7	Karen Carney
MF	8	Fara Williams
MF	11	Rachel Yankey
FW	9	Eniola Aluko		(substituted off) 72'
FW	10	Kelly Smith	(yellow card) 90+4'
Substitutions:
MF	16	Jill Scott		(substituted on) 72'
DF	20	Lindsay Johnson		(substituted on) 89'
Manager:
(England) Hope Powell

=== Argentina vs Japan ===
14 September 2007
17:00

Argentina	0–1	Japan
	Report	Nagasato 90+1'

Hongkou Football Stadium, Shanghai
Attendance: 27,730
Referee: Dagmar Damková (Czech Republic)

Argentina:
GK	1	Romina Ferro
RB	17	Fabiana Gisella Vallejos
CB	14	Catalina Pérez
CB	2	Eva Nadia González (c)
LB	19	Analía Soledad Almeida
DM	13	María Florencia Quiñones	(substituted off) 61'
RM	4	Gabriela Patricia Chávez
LM	8	Clarisa Belén Huber	(substituted off) 53'
AM	15	Florencia Mandrile
CF	20	Mercedes Pereyra
CF	18	María Belén Potassa	(substituted off) 77'
Substitutions:
FW	16	Andrea Susana Ojeda	(substituted on) 53'
FW	10	Emilia Mendieta	(substituted on) 61'
FW	7	Ludmila Manicler	(substituted on) 77'
Manager:
(Argentina) José Carlos Borello

Japan:
GK	1	Miho Fukumoto
RB	13	Kozue Ando		(substituted off) 79'
CB	2	Hiromi Isozaki (c)	(yellow card) 57'
CB	15	Azusa Iwashimizu
LB	4	Kyoko Yano		(substituted off) 50'
DM	7	Tomomi Miyamoto
RM	8	Tomoe Sakai
LM	16	Aya Miyama
AM	10	Homare Sawa
CF	17	Yuki Nagasato
CF	18	Shinobu Ohno		(substituted off) 57'
Substitutions:
DF	20	Rumi Utsugi		(substituted on) 50'
FW	9	Eriko Arakawa		(substituted on) 57'
DF	3	Yukari Kinga		(substituted on) 71'
Manager:
(Japan) Hiroshi Ohashi

=== England vs Germany ===
14 September 2007
20:00

England	0–0	Germany
	Report

Hongkou Football Stadium, Shanghai
Attendance: 27,730
Referee: Jenny Palmqvist (Sweden)

England:
GK	1	Rachel Brown
DF	2	Alex Scott
DF	3	Casey Stoney
DF	5	Faye White (c)
DF	6	Mary Phillip
DF	12	Anita Asante
MF	4	Katie Chapman	(yellow card) 16'
MF	7	Karen Carney		(substituted off) 57'
MF	8	Fara Williams	(yellow card) 55'
MF	16	Jill Scott
FW	10	Kelly Smith
Substitutions:
MF	11	Rachel Yankey		(substituted on) 57'
Manager:
(England) Hope Powell

Germany:
GK	1	Nadine Angerer
DF	2	Kerstin Stegemann
DF	5	Annike Krahn	(yellow card) 36'
DF	17	Ariane Hingst
MF	6	Linda Bresonik
MF	7	Melanie Behringer		(substituted off) 63'
MF	10	Renate Lingor
MF	18	Kerstin Garefrekes
MF	14	Simone Laudehr	(yellow card) 84'
FW	8	Sandra Smisek
FW	9	Birgit Prinz (c)
Substitutions:
MF	19	Fatmire Bajramaj	(yellow card) 85'	(substituted on) 63'
Manager:
(Germany) Silvia Neid

=== Germany vs Japan ===
17 September 2007 (Note: The two matches that were originally scheduled on 18 September were moved to a day earlier due to commemorations for the Mukden Incident.)
20:00

Germany	2–0	Japan
Prinz 21'; Lingor 87' (pen.)	Report

Yellow Dragon Stadium, Hangzhou
Attendance: 39,817
Referee: Adriana Correa (Colombia)

Germany:
GK	1	Nadine Angerer
DF	2	Kerstin Stegemann
DF	5	Annike Krahn
DF	17	Ariane Hingst
MF	6	Linda Bresonik
MF	7	Melanie Behringer		(substituted off) 57'
MF	10	Renate Lingor
MF	18	Kerstin Garefrekes	(yellow card) 82'
FW	20	Petra Wimbersky
FW	8	Sandra Smisek		(substituted off) 78'
FW	9	Birgit Prinz (c)
Substitutions:
MF	19	Fatmire Bajramaj		(substituted on) 57'
FW	16	Martina Müller	(yellow card) 88'	(substituted on) 78'
Manager:
(Germany) Silvia Neid

Japan:
GK	1	Miho Fukumoto
RB	3	Yukari Kinga
CB	2	Hiromi Isozaki (c)
CB	15	Azusa Iwashimizu
LB	20	Rumi Utsugi
DM	5	Miyuki Yanagita
RM	8	Tomoe Sakai	(yellow card) 16'
CM	10	Homare Sawa
CM	6	Ayumi Hara
LM	16	Aya Miyama		(substituted off) 46'
CF	17	Yuki Nagasato		(substituted off) 76'
Substitutions:
FW	9	Eriko Arakawa	(substituted on) 46'	(substituted off) 63'
FW	18	Shinobu Ohno		(substituted on) 63'
MF	7	Tomomi Miyamoto		(substituted on) 76'
Manager:
(Japan) Hiroshi Ohashi

=== England vs Argentina ===
17 September 2007
20:00

England	6–1	Argentina
González 9' (o.g.); J. Scott 10'; Williams 50' (pen.); K. Smith 64', 77'; Exley 90' (pen.)	Report	González 60'

Chengdu Sports Centre Stadium, Chengdu
Attendance: 30,730
Referee: Dianne Ferreira-James (Guyana)

England:
GK	1	Rachel Brown
DF	2	Alex Scott	(yellow card) 4'	(substituted off) 68'
DF	3	Casey Stoney
DF	5	Faye White (c)
DF	6	Mary Phillip
DF	12	Anita Asante
MF	11	Rachel Yankey
MF	8	Fara Williams	(yellow card) 61'
MF	16	Jill Scott
FW	9	Eniola Aluko		(substituted off) 80'
FW	10	Kelly Smith		(substituted off) 80'
Substitutions:
MF	11	Sue Smith		(substituted on) 68'
FW	17	Jody Handley		(substituted on) 80'
MF	19	Vicky Exley		(substituted on) 80'
Manager:
(England) Hope Powell

Argentina:
GK	1	Romina Ferro
RB	17	Fabiana Gisella Vallejos
CB	14	Catalina Pérez	(yellow card) 41' (yellow-red card) 49'
CB	2	Eva Nadia González (c)	(yellow card) 42'
LB	19	Analía Soledad Almeida		(substituted off) 62'
DM	13	María Florencia Quiñones		(substituted off) 76'
RM	4	Gabriela Patricia Chávez
LM	8	Clarisa Belén Huber		(substituted off) 52'
AM	15	Florencia Mandrile
CF	20	Mercedes Pereyra
CF	18	María Belén Potassa
Substitutions:
DF	3	Valeria Cotelo		(substituted on) 52'
FW	9	Natalia Gatti		(substituted on) 62'
FW	10	Emilia Mendieta		(substituted on) 76'
Manager:
(Argentina) José Carlos Borello

== See also ==
- Argentina at the FIFA Women's World Cup
- England at the FIFA Women's World Cup
- Germany at the FIFA Women's World Cup
- Japan at the FIFA Women's World Cup
