= List of FIFA Women's World Cup finals =

FIFA Women's World Cup final
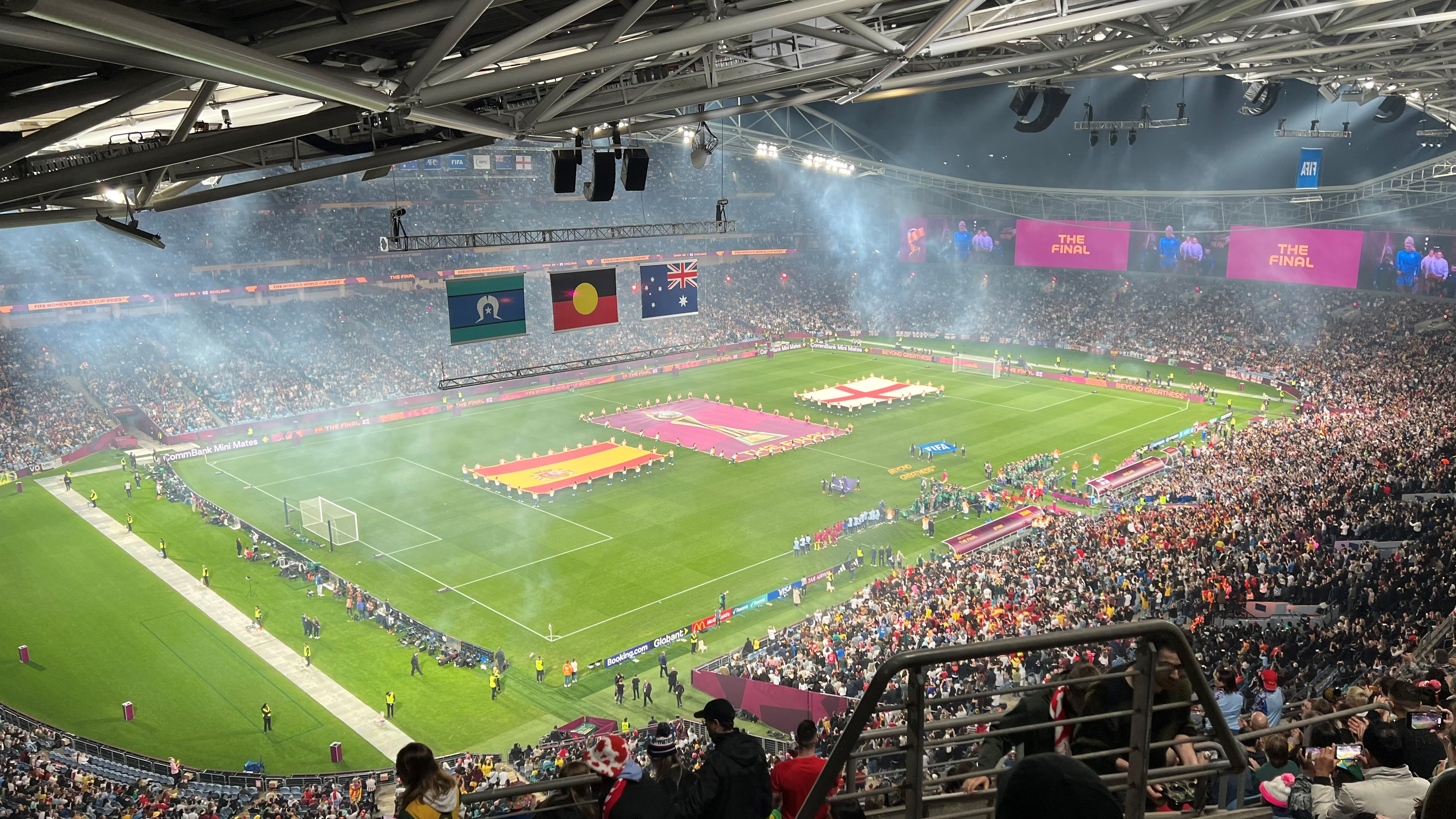
- The 2023 final was played at Stadium Australia in Sydney, Australia.
- Organiser(s): FIFA
- Founded: 1991; 35 years ago
- Region: International
- Current champions: Spain (1st title)
- Most championships: United States (4 titles)

The FIFA Women's World Cup is the international association football championship for women's national teams who represent members of FIFA, the sport's global governing body. It has been contested every four years since 1991 between teams who qualify through continental competitions, alongside the hosts who have an automatic berth. The tournament is one of the most-watched women's sporting events in the world, with a global television audience of over 82.18 million viewers for the 2019 final.

Like modern editions of the men's tournament, the FIFA Women's World Cup final is the last match of the competition's knockout stage. The single match is played by the two remaining teams who advanced from the semifinal round and determines the world champions in women's association football. In the event of a draw after 90 minutes of regulation time, an additional 30 minutes of extra time is used to determine a winner. If scores are still tied, a penalty shootout is played until one team wins. Some editions of the tournament allowed for a golden goal in extra time to determine a winner, which was used in the 2003 final.

The inaugural edition was hosted by China in 1991 and featured 12 teams playing 80-minute matches. It was preceded by several unofficial world championships, but the 1991 tournament was the first to be organized directly by FIFA. It was known as the 1st FIFA World Championship for Women's Football for the M&Ms Cup and retroactively given the World Cup moniker. The World Cup expanded to 16 teams in the 1999 edition, which was hosted by the United States and drew record attendances. The 2003 edition was planned to be hosted by China, but moved to the United States due to a major SARS outbreak. An expansion to 24 teams in the 2015 edition was followed by the adoption of the current 32-team format for the 2023 edition, the first with multiple host countries.

A total of ten teams have played in the nine finals held since 1991; five have won a title. The United States is the most successful team in Women's World Cup history, having won four titles in five finals. Germany has two titles and finished as runners-up once; Japan and Norway each have one title and have both finished as runners-up in another final. The most recent tournament, hosted by Australia and New Zealand in 2023, was won by Spain; they defeated fellow first-time finalists England in the final, played at Stadium Australia in Sydney. The team that wins the final is presented with the FIFA Women's World Cup Trophy, which is kept by FIFA and displayed occasionally on tours or at the FIFA Museum in Zürich, Switzerland. A replica, called the FIFA Women's World Cup Winner's Trophy, is awarded to the winning team and engraved with their name.

== List of finals ==
Host venues of FIFA Women's World Cup finals

Key to the list of finals
*	Match was won with a golden goal
‡	Match decided by a penalty shootout after extra time

List of FIFA Women's World Cup finals
Year	Winners	Score	Runners-up	Venue	Location	Attendance
1991	United States	2–1	Norway	Tianhe Stadium	Guangzhou, China	63,000
1995	Norway	2–0	Germany	Råsunda Stadium	Stockholm, Sweden	17,158
1999	United States	0–0 ‡ (5–4 p)	China	Rose Bowl	Pasadena, California, U.S.	90,185
2003	Germany	2–1 *	Sweden	Home Depot Center	Carson, California, U.S.	26,137
2007	Germany	2–0	Brazil	Hongkou Football Stadium	Shanghai, China	31,000
2011	Japan	2–2 ‡ (3–1 p)	United States	Commerzbank-Arena	Frankfurt, Germany	48,817
2015	United States	5–2	Japan	BC Place	Vancouver, Canada	53,341
2019	United States	2–0	Netherlands	Parc Olympique Lyonnais	Décines-Charpieu, France	57,900
2023	Spain	1–0	England	Stadium Australia	Sydney, Australia	75,784
2027		–		Maracanã Stadium	Rio de Janeiro, Brazil	

== Results by nation ==
Map of winning countries

Results by nation
National team	Wins	Runners-up	Total finals	Years won	Years runners-up
United States	4	1	5	1991, 1999, 2015, 2019	2011
Germany	2	1	3	2003, 2007	1995
Japan	1	1	2	2011	2015
Norway	1	1	2	1995	1991
Spain	1	0	1	2023	–
Brazil	0	1	1	–	2007
China	0	1	1	–	1999
Netherlands	0	1	1	–	2019
Sweden	0	1	1	–	2003
England	0	1	1	–	2023

== Results by confederation ==
The national associations that compete in FIFA events are also members of six regional confederations that represent different regions of the world, generally organized by continent. Teams from three confederations have won the tournament: UEFA, which represents Europe; CONCACAF, which represents North America, Central America, and the Caribbean; and AFC, which represents Asia. The South American confederation, CONMEBOL, has also had a team finish as runners-up. The remaining two confederations have not had a finalist: CAF (Africa) and OFC (Oceania).

Results by confederation
Confederation	Appearances	Winners	Runners-up
UEFA	9	4	5
CONCACAF	5	4	1
AFC	3	1	2
CONMEBOL	1	0	1

== See also ==
- List of FIFA World Cup finals
