= Nadine Angerer =

German football coach and player (born 1978)

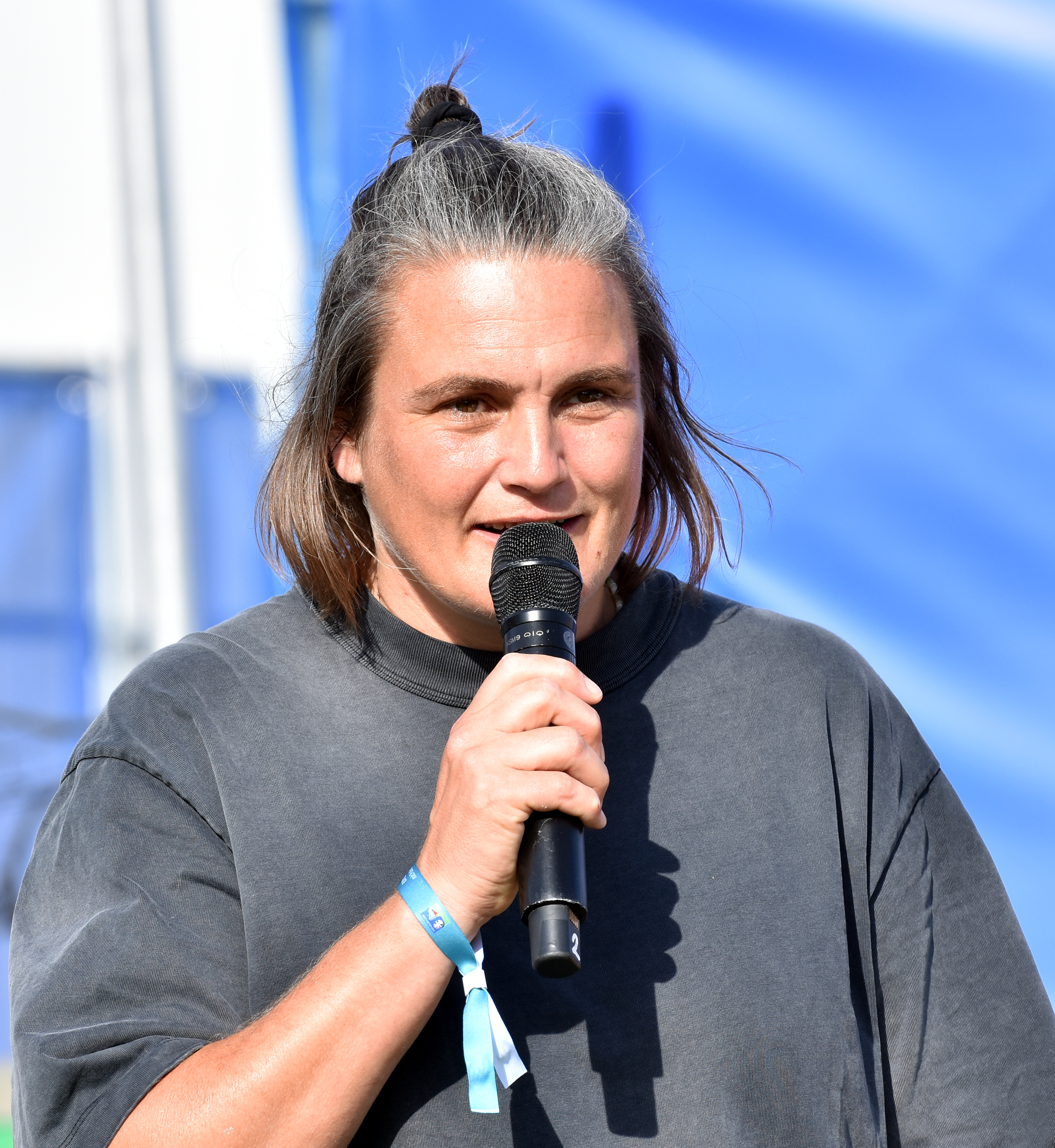
- Angerer in 2024

Personal information
- Full name: Nadine Marejke Angerer
- Date of birth: 10 November 1978 (age 47)
- Place of birth: Lohr am Main, Bavaria, West Germany
- Height: 1.75 m (5 ft 9 in)
- Position: Goalkeeper

Team information
- Current team: Portland Thorns

Youth career
- ESV Gemünden
- ASV Hofstetten

Senior career*
Years	Team	Apps	(Gls)
1995–1996	1. FC Nürnberg		
1996–1999	FC Wacker München		
1999–2001	FC Bayern Munich	17	(0)
2001–2007	1. FFC Turbine Potsdam	126	(0)
2008	Djurgårdens IF	22	(0)
2009–2013	1. FFC Frankfurt	85	(0)
2013–2014	Brisbane Roar	9	(0)
2014–2015	Portland Thorns	28	(0)
2014	→ Brisbane Roar (loan)	8	(0)
2020	Portland Thorns	0	(0)

International career
1996–2015	Germany	146	(0)

Managerial career
- 2015–2023: Portland Thorns (goalkeeping)
- 2024–: Switzerland (goalkeeping)
Medal record
Women's football
Representing Germany
FIFA Women's World Cup
Gold medal – first place	2003 United States	Team
Gold medal – first place	2007 China	Team
Olympic Games
Bronze medal – third place	2000 Sydney	Team
Bronze medal – third place	2004 Athens	Team
Bronze medal – third place	2008 Beijing	Team
UEFA Women's Championship
Gold medal – first place	1997 Norway/Sweden	Team
Gold medal – first place	2001 Germany	Team
Gold medal – first place	2005 England	Team
Gold medal – first place	2009 Finland	Team
Gold medal – first place	2013 Sweden	Team
- * Club domestic league appearances and goals as of 11:57, 18 July 2020 (UTC)

Nadine Marejke Angerer (born 10 November 1978) is a German football coach and player who is the former goalkeeping player-coach for Portland Thorns of the National Women's Soccer League (NWSL).

Angerer has played for Frauen-Bundesliga clubs Bayern Munich, Turbine Potsdam (with whom she won the 2005 UEFA Women's Cup) and FFC Frankfurt. In 2008, she played for Djurgårdens IF of the Swedish Damallsvenskan and she spent two periods on loan with Brisbane Roar of the Australian W-League in 2013 and 2014. During her extensive international career, Angerer was recognised as one of the world's best goalkeepers.

Since making her debut for the Germany women's national football team in August 1996, Angerer won a total of 146 caps. She understudied Silke Rottenberg at the UEFA Women's Championship in 1997, 2001 and 2005; the FIFA Women's World Cup in 1999 and 2003; as well as the 2000 and 2004 Olympic football tournaments. When Rottenberg was injured before the 2007 FIFA Women's World Cup, Angerer took over as first choice and kept a clean sheet in every round as Germany won the tournament. She remained first choice for the 2009 and 2013 editions of the UEFA Women's Championship, the 2011 and 2015 FIFA Women's World Cups and the 2008 Olympics.

Germany won the UEFA Women's Championship on each of the five occasions Angerer was involved and won the FIFA Women's World Cup in 2003 and 2007. Their best finish at the Olympics was third in 2000, 2004 and 2008. Angerer is a penalty-saving specialist, having stopped Marta's kick in the 2007 FIFA Women's World Cup Final and both Trine Rønning and Solveig Gulbrandsen's during the UEFA Women's Euro 2013 Final. She was appointed captain of Germany in 2011 following the retirement of Birgit Prinz. On 13 January 2014, Angerer was named FIFA World Player of the Year, becoming the first goalkeeper – male or female – to win the award. She announced her retirement from the international team on 13 May 2015.

== Club career ==
Angerer was born in Lohr am Main, near Frankfurt. Her career began with ASV Hofstetten, where she played as a forward. When she substituted for the injured goalkeeper during a youth scouting game, she was discovered as a goalkeeping talent. In 1995, she moved to 1. FC Nürnberg and one year later to FC Wacker München. While at Wacker, she rejected the opportunity to play for an American college soccer team.

From 1999 to 2001, Angerer played at FC Bayern Munich, helping the team achieve promotion to Germany's top division, the Bundesliga. She transferred to 1. FFC Turbine Potsdam in 2001, where she claimed two national Bundesliga championships, three German Cup wins and the UEFA Women's Cup in the 2004–05 season.

After seven years at Potsdam, Angerer left Germany in 2008 to play at Djurgårdens IF Dam in Sweden, replacing Bente Nordby. She returned to Germany after only one season to join 1. FFC Frankfurt. She won the German Cup for a fourth time with Frankfurt in 2011. Following Birgit Prinz's retirement she was appointed Frankfurt's new captain.

While playing at the UEFA Women's Euro 2013 Angerer announced her signing on a free transfer with the Brisbane Roar in Australia's W-League and further plans for a move to an as yet unspecified team in the NWSL by January 2014.

=== Portland Thorns FC ===
On 13 January 2014, Portland Thorns FC announced Angerer's acquisition to play for Portland for the National Women's Soccer League 2014 Season, replacing Karina LeBlanc who was traded to the Chicago Red Stars. She made her debut for Portland with a shutout against the Houston Dash on 12 April and went on to start 22 games for the Thorns, adding another three saves while compiling 74 saves (both ranking fourth in the league). After the season, Angerer was loaned to the Brisbane Roar with plans to return to Portland for the start of the 2015 season.

Angerer retired from being a professional footballer in 2015.

On 17 July 2020, Angerer was signed as an emergency replacement goalkeeper by Portland Thorns FC during the 2020 NWSL Challenge Cup.

== International career ==
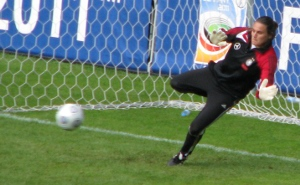
Angerer with Germany in 2009

Angerer made her international debut for Germany against the Netherlands in August 1996. However, after five matches in quick succession she was only used sporadically thereafter. Angerer was Germany's second choice goalkeeper behind Silke Rottenberg for almost a decade, winning six major titles as a reserve player without having played in a single game, including the 2003 FIFA Women's World Cup, two Olympic bronze medals in 2000 and 2004, and three UEFA European Championships in 1997, 2001 and 2005.

When Rottenberg suffered an anterior cruciate ligament injury, Angerer was picked as the starting goalkeeper for the 2007 FIFA Women's World Cup. During the entire tournament she did not concede a single goal, setting the record for most consecutive minutes played without conceding a goal in World Cup play to 540 minutes. This included blocking a penalty kick by Marta in the 2–0 final win over Brazil. Along with Norway's Bente Nordby, she was named in FIFA's tournament All-Star Team.

Angerer remained Germany's national team goalkeeper for the 2008 Summer Olympics, claiming the bronze medal. She won the European Championship for a fourth time in 2009, the first time she had been a starter for Germany. Angerer was called up for the 2011 FIFA Women's World Cup squad and received her 100th cap in her team's second match of the tournament, against Nigeria.

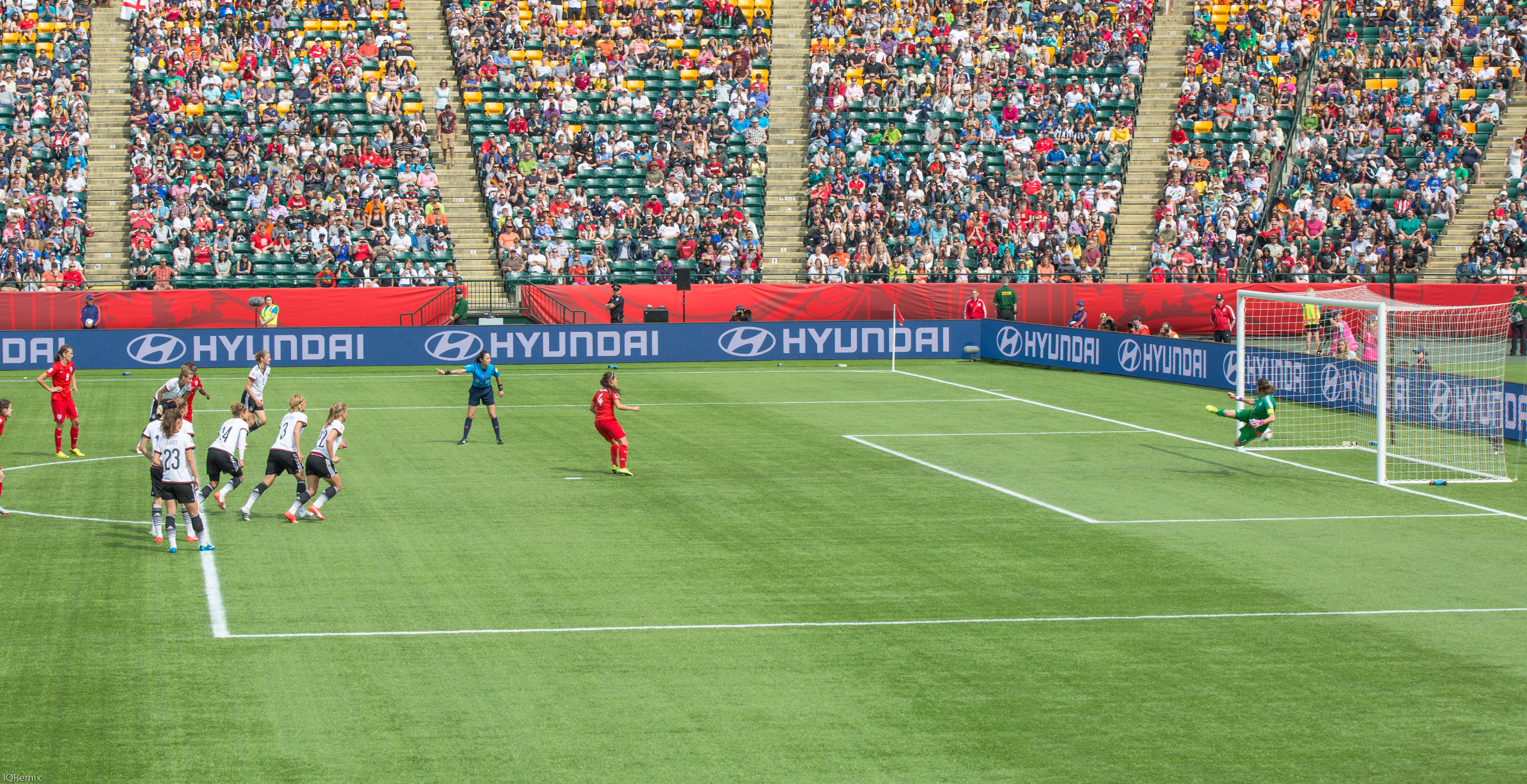
England's Fara Williams (left) and Angerer at the 2015 FIFA Women's World Cup

Following Birgit Prinz's retirement Angerer was appointed the national team's new captain. She saved penalty kicks from both Trine Rønning and Solveig Gulbrandsen during the UEFA Women's Euro 2013 final at Friends Arena on 28 July 2013, and was named player of the match following Germany's 1–0 win against Norway. Anja Mittag's goal gave the Germans their sixth successive title.

In May 2015, Angerer was named to Germany's roster for the 2015 FIFA Women's World Cup in Canada. During a quarter-final match against France, she denied Claire Lavogez who took the crucial fifth penalty during the penalty shootout to clinch the win and advance to the semi-finals against the United States. Germany lost the semi-final 2–0 to the United States after Carli Lloyd scored a penalty and Kelley O'Hara added a second goal. In Angerer's final game with the national team she was beaten by another penalty, despite her angry protests. Fara Williams gave England a 1–0 extra time win in the bronze medal match.

== Coaching career ==
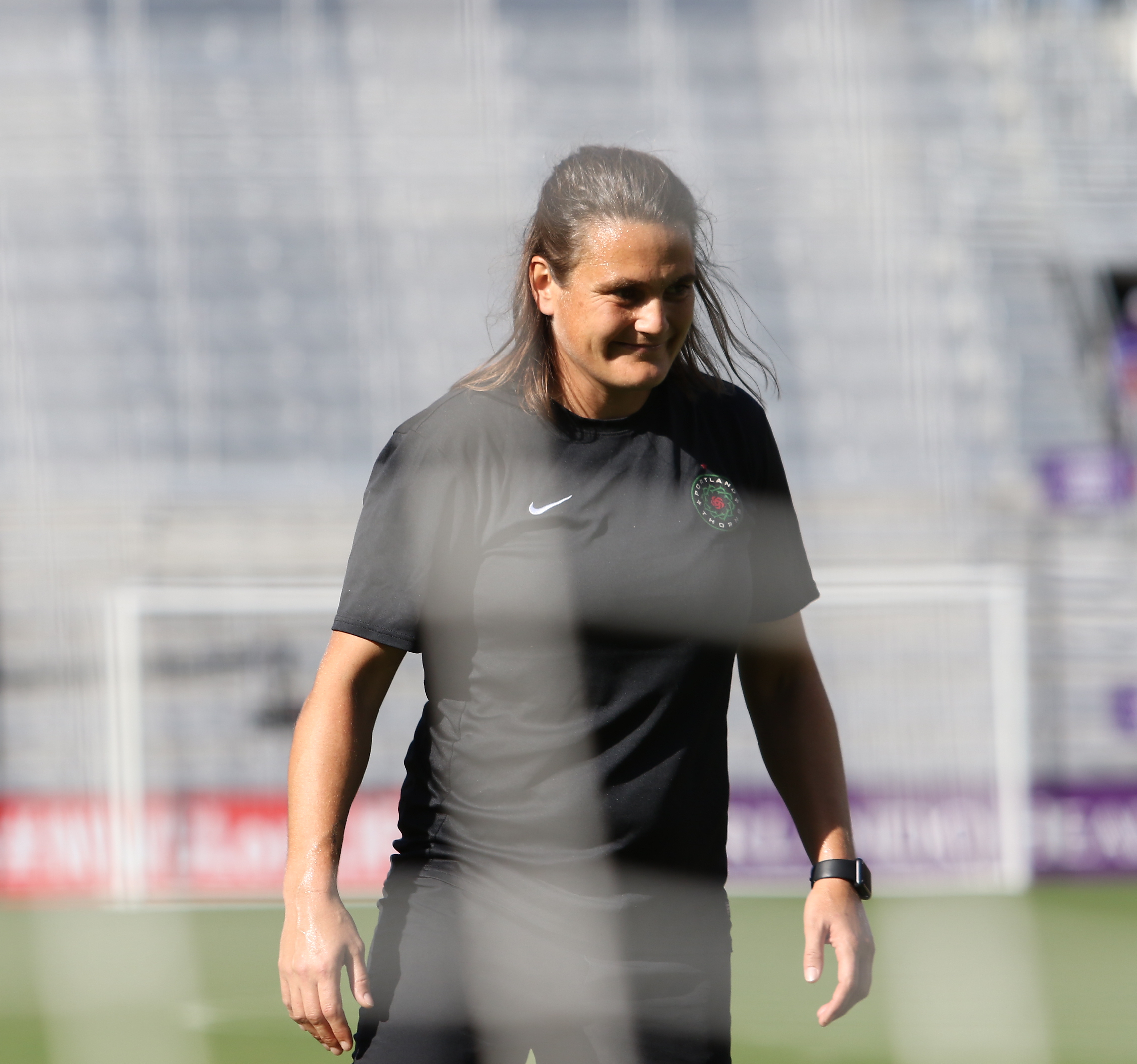
Nadine Angerer as Portland Thorns goalkeeping coach in 2017

=== Portland Thorns FC ===
After two years as a Thorns keeper, Angerer was named full-time goalkeeper coach for the Portland Thorns in 2016. She left the Thorns after the 2023 season.

=== Switzerland ===
In 2024 Angerer was announced as the new goalkeeper coach for Switzerland.

== Personal life ==
After abandoning an apprenticeship as an event technician, Angerer trained as a physiotherapist and took a break from the national team in 2006–07 to complete her exams. Angerer told the German newspaper Die Zeit in December 2010 that she does not discriminate on grounds of gender when considering personal relationships.

Angerer married Magdalena (née Golombek) in November 2016.

== Honours ==
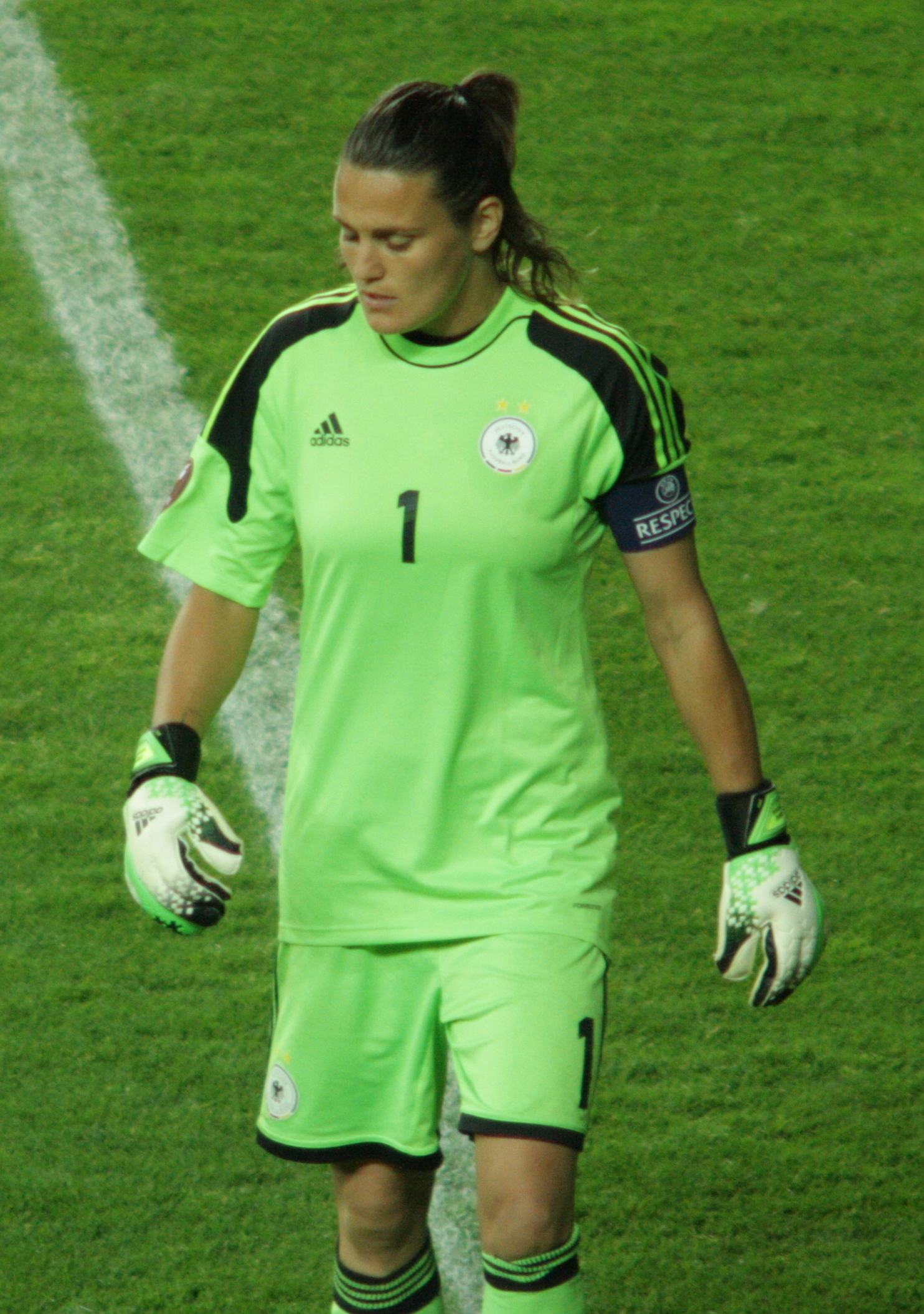
Angerer captaining Germany at Euro 2013

=== Club ===
Turbine Potsdam

- UEFA Women's Cup: 2004–05
- Bundesliga: 2003–04, 2005–06
- German Cup: 2003–04, 2004–05, 2005–06

1. FFC Frankfurt

- German Cup: 2010–11

=== International ===
- FIFA World Cup: 2003, 2007
- UEFA European Football Championship: 1997, 2001, 2005, 2009, 2013
- Olympic bronze medal: 2000, 2004, 2008
- Algarve Cup: 2006, 2014

=== Individual ===
- FIFA Women's World Cup All-Star Team: 2007, 2015
- FIFA Women's World Cup Best Goalkeeper: 2007
- Silbernes Lorbeerblatt
- UEFA Women's Euro Squad of the Tournament: 2013
- UEFA Women's Euro Best Player of the Tournament: 2013
- UEFA Best Women's Player in Europe Award: 2013
- FIFA World Player of the Year: 2013
- IFFHS UEFA Woman Team of the Decade 2011–2020

== See also ==
- List of German women's football champions
- List of Olympic medalists in football
- Football in Germany
