= IRENA Group =

Chinese platform company for sports

The IRENA Group (simplified Chinese: 体育之窗; traditional Chinese: 體育之窗; pinyin: Tǐyù Zhīchuāng) is a platform company in China's sports industry. The company also known for its brand iRENA.

== Company ==
Founded in 2001, the IRENA Group provides venue operation, sports events operation, copyrights trading, tickets services, mobile game services, fan club services and franchising of sports events.

On November 16, 2015, IRENA was listed on the National Equities Exchange and Quotations (NEEQ), as NEEQ: 834358.

In 2016 the company participated in a private equity fund based in Changxing as general partner and "deferred-class" limited partner for a combined CN¥150 million, while a subsidiary (Chinese: 东方邦信资本管理有限公司; lit. 'Orient–Bangxin Capital Management') of China Orient Asset Management, subscribed CN¥450 million as limited partner. In turn the fund would subscribe the capital increase of a wholly owned subsidiary of IRENA based in Shenzhen (Chinese: 体育之窗文化传播(深圳)有限公司), for CN¥464.669 million, making the fund was the ownership of the ex-subsidiary for 98.84% stake. It was announced on 13 January the fund would acquire 3.9086% stake of Zhejiang Chouzhou Bank from Hangzhou Yuning Electronic Technology for CN¥464.669 million.

== Sponsored events ==
- Chinese Super League
- China Basketball Association
- NBA China Game
- Asian Women's Volleyball Championship

== Operating venues ==
- Beijing Worker's Stadium
- Hongkou Football Stadium
- Tianjin Olympic Center Stadium
- Helong Stadium
