= Helong Sports Center Stadium =

Sports venue in Changsha, China

He Long Sports Centre
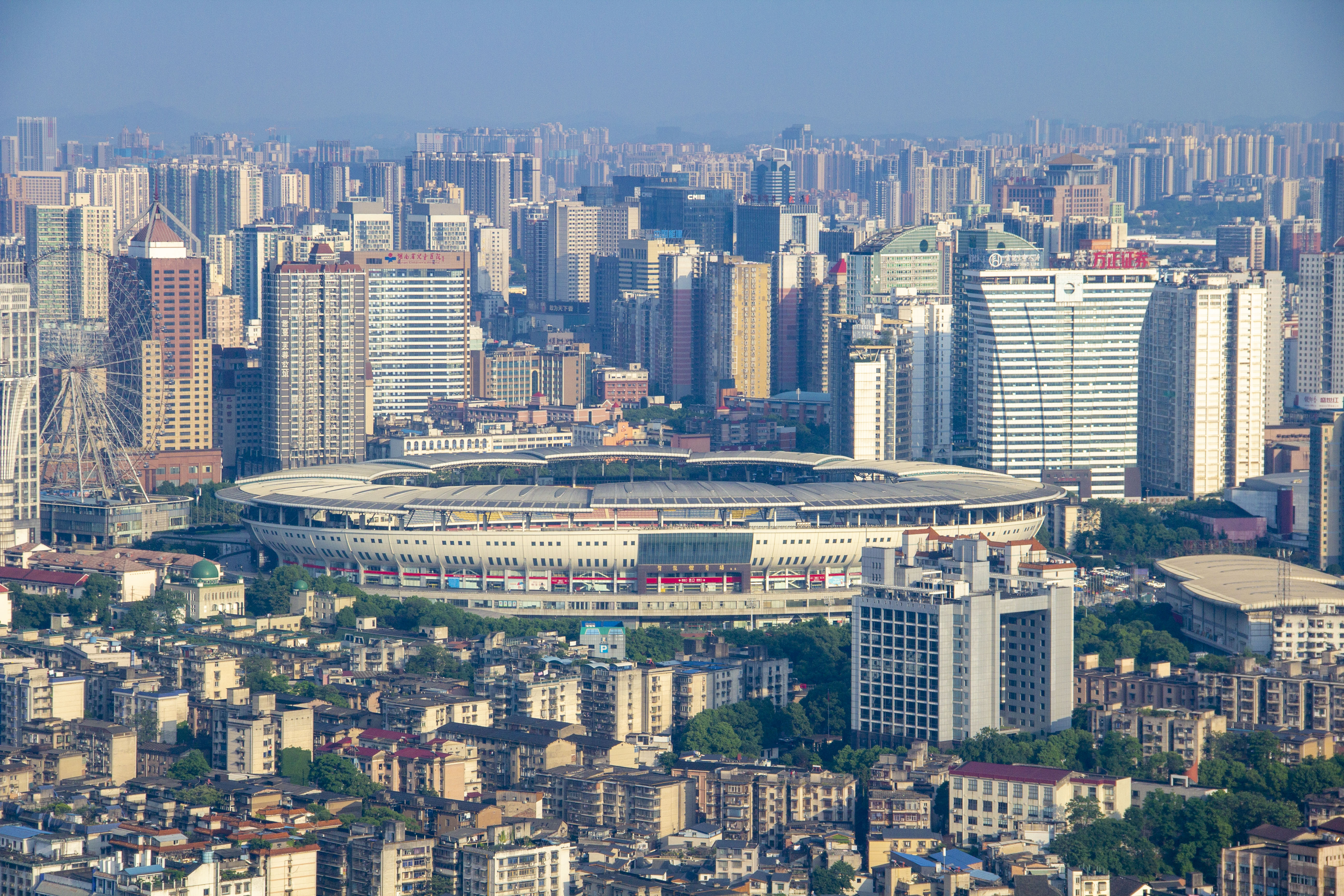
- He Long Sports Centre in 2021
- Interactive map of He Long Sports Centre
- Full name: 贺龙体育场
- Location: No. 358 Laodong (Labor) Rd, Tianxin District, Changsha, Hunan, China
- Coordinates: 28°10′54.32″N 112°58′38.29″E
- Operator: IRENA Group
- Capacity: 55,000
- Surface: grass
- Public transit: 1 3 at Houjiatang

Construction
- Built: November 1991

Tenants
- Hunan Billows F.C., football matches, China national football team

The He Long Stadium at the He Long Sports Centre (simplified Chinese: 贺龙体育场; traditional Chinese: 賀龍體育場; pinyin: Hèlóng Tǐyùchǎng) is a multi-purpose stadium in Changsha, Hunan province, China. It is named after Marshal He Long, who was born in the same province and a dedicated supporter of the Chinese "Three Major Ball Games" (三大球).

The stadium is currently used mostly for football matches. It holds 55,000 people, and was constructed in 1987. The stadium is an all-seater, with a roof covering all spectators.

== FIFA International A Matches ==
Date	Home	vs	Away	Competitions	Goals
2005-05-19	China	2–2	Costa Rica	FIFA Friendly Match	Zhang Yaokun, Mauricio Solis, Ronald Gomez, Sun Xiang
2006-11-15	China	1–1	Iraq	2007 AFC Asian Cup Qualifyings	Han Peng, Ahmad Salah Alwan
2013-03-22	China	1–0	Iraq	2015 AFC Asian Cup Qualifyings	Yu Dabao
2014-10-14	China	2–1	Paraguay	FIFA Friendly Match	Zheng Zhi, Wu Lei, Néstor Ortigoza
2015-03-27	China	2–2	Haiti	FIFA Friendly Match	Jeff Louis, Yang Xu, Wilde-Donald Guerrier, Yu Dabao
2015-11-12	China	12–0	Bhutan	2018 FIFA World Cup qualification	Yang Xu (4), Yu Dabao (2), Yu Hanchao (2), Wang Yongpo (2), Mei Fang, Zhang Xizhe
2017-03-23	China	1–0	South Korea	2018 FIFA World Cup qualification	Yu Dabao

== Notable events ==
S.H.E - Perfect 3 World Tour - 13 October 2006

Jacky Cheung - A Classic Tour - 25 December 2017

Joker Xue - Skyscraper World Tour - 21 September 2018

Westlife - The Wild Dreams Tour - 15 September 2023

Joker Xue - Extraterrestrial World Tour - 14–16 June 2024

Joker Xue - The King of Beasts Tour - 10-12, 17-19 April 2026
