= Johnson Wen =

Australian influencer born in 1998 or 1999

- Born: Australia
- Other name: Pyjama Man (online alias)
- Occupations: Self‑described “influencer”, event crasher, serial intruder
- Known for: Disrupting red‑carpet events, concerts, and public events to approach celebrities; posting footage of such incidents on social media

Johnson Wen is an Australian serial barricade jumper who also goes by his online moniker, Pyjama Man.

== Biography ==
Wen was born to a Chinese father and a Filipino mother, and has a sister. As of 2023, he worked with a solar film company while living in Sydney.

On 11 July 2020, Wen climbed over the railings of the five-metre high Museum and Cultural Centre footbridge at Southbank and dangled over the bridge, He was fined A$250 (2020) (equivalent to A$274.12 or US$198.9 in 2022) for the stunt. On 18 November 2020, Wen invaded the pitch during a State of Origin match at Suncorp Stadium. He was subsequently fined A$220 (2020) (equivalent to A$241.22 or US$175.03 in 2022) with no conviction entered.

On 20 August 2023, during the 2023 FIFA Women's World Cup final, Wen wore an anti-Putin shirt and invaded the pitch. Subsequently, during the 2023 Cricket World Cup final on 19 November, Wen, wearing pro-Palestinian garb and carrying an LGBTQIA+ Pride flag, ran onto the ground at Narendra Modi Stadium just before the drinks break at around 3pm, and was arrested for criminal trespass after approaching Virat Kohli. While on bail, he was put up in a hotel by the police as he had no means to feed himself. The Indian police stated that Wen was "in the habit of associating himself with any current international issue and invading fields just to get publicity to become famous as a TikToker".

In August 2024, Wen jumped the tracks at the 2024 Summer Olympics' men's 100 metres finals, causing a slight delay in the event as the security swiftly apprehended him. The disruption was not noticed by the sprinters. He was subsequently fined €8,000 (2024) (US$8,658.01) and was banned from Stade de France for three years, and from any future Olympic Games. In October 2024, he invaded the stage of The Weeknd's tour stop in Melbourne. In a subsequent interview, he stated that despite public opinion, he would continue to disrupt high profile events. He also stated that some of his fines were paid by his sister and he was fully aware of the outcomes of such stunts.

In June 2025, he invaded the stage of Katy Perry's concert in Sydney. It earned him a six-month ban from entry into Sydney Olympic Park as well as being charged by authorities with two offenses: entering enclosed land and obstructing a person in performance of work or duties.

On 13 November 2025, Wen jumped the barricade at the Wicked: For Good premiere in Singapore and attempted to hug Ariana Grande. He was stopped by Grande's fellow cast member, Cynthia Erivo, and subsequently was booted out from the venue by security personnel. Wen was charged of being a public nuisance. On 17 November 2025, Wen was jailed for nine days under the charge of causing annoyance to the public. Wen admitted that he knew his acts would cause annoyance to the public. Upon released from jail, Wen was deported from Singapore and was also put on a no-entry list by Immigration and Checkpoints Authority, preventing him from returning to Singapore in the future.

On 9 December 2025, Wen was kicked out from Lady Gaga's The Mayhem Ball tour stop in Brisbane, Australia. He was spotted by fans attending the concert wearing a disguise. The venue, Suncorp Stadium, had also deemed him as a person of interest and that he was not to be allowed entry during the event.

== See also ==
- Neil Horan
- Vitalii Sediuk
