= 2023 FIFA Women's World Cup final =

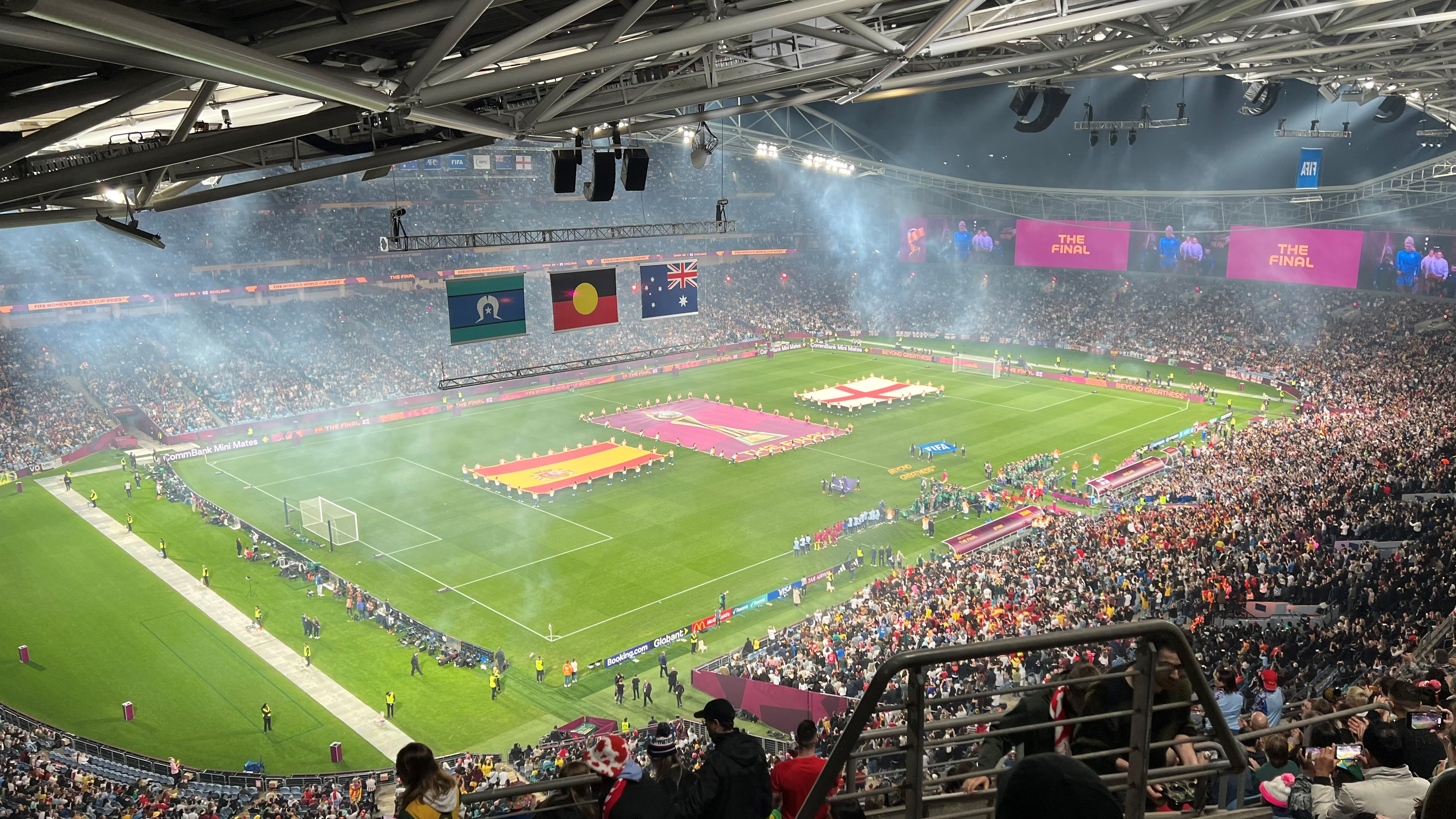
- Stadium Australia in Sydney hosted the final.
- Event: 2023 FIFA Women's World Cup
Spain	England
1	0
- Date: 20 August 2023
- Venue: Stadium Australia, Sydney
- Player of the Match: Olga Carmona (Spain)
- Referee: Tori Penso (United States)
- Attendance: 75,784
- Weather: Clear night 14.3 °C (57.7 °F); 69% humidity

The 2023 FIFA Women's World Cup final was an association football match that determined the winner of the 2023 FIFA Women's World Cup. The match was played at the Stadium Australia in Sydney, Australia, on 20 August 2023, and was contested by Spain and England. It took place in front of 75,784 supporters, and Spain won the final 1–0 through a goal from Olga Carmona, assisted by Mariona Caldentey.

For both finalists, this was the first appearance in a Women's World Cup final. Both teams were looking to become only the second country to win both men's and women's World Cups – Germany accomplished the feat in 2003 – as well as becoming the first team representing UEFA to win the tournament since Germany in 2007. This was the third all-European final in the Women's World Cup, after the 1995 and 2003 finals, both of which were also contested between two sides that had not won the tournament.

== Background ==
Both teams were making their Women's World Cup final debut. Spain had appeared in two previous Women's World Cups and advanced as far as the round of 16 in 2019. England had played in five previous Women's World Cups and achieved their best prior performance in 2015, when they finished third.

This final was the third all-European final in Women's World Cup history after 1995—when Norway won their first title by beating Germany in Stockholm—and 2003—when Germany won their first title via a golden goal against Sweden in the United States to become the first country to have won both senior World Cups; at the time, their men's team had won three world titles. The winners of the match would follow Germany in that respect; Spain men's team had won the 2010 World Cup, while England's title came in 1966. They would also become the first European team to win the tournament since the Germans in 2007 and the first new Women's World Cup champions since Japan in 2011.

This was the seventeenth meeting between the two teams: England had been more successful, with seven victories to Spain's three, and six draws. Three of those matches had been in a major tournament, all at the UEFA Women's Championship. Spain won their first Euros encounter, with England winning the last two matches at the 2017 and the 2022 tournaments respectively.

Spain's Jorge Vilda managed in his fourth consecutive major championship and the second in the Women's World Cup. He became the first man to manage a Women's World Cup-winning side since Norio Sasaki with Japan in 2011 and the first European man since Even Pellerud in 1995 to win it.

England manager Sarina Wiegman was also at her fourth consecutive major championship, and fourth consecutive final after winning the 2017 Euros and finishing as runners-up in the 2019 Women's World Cup with her native Netherlands in addition to winning the Women's Euro 2022 with England. She was the first person to lead different nations in multiple men's or women's World Cup finals and seeking to become the first manager to win either tournament with a foreign national team. As she lost, she became the first manager to lose two successive World Cup finals.

== Venue ==
The final was held at Stadium Australia (also known as Accor Stadium) in Sydney, New South Wales. The venue has a capacity of 75,784, and hosted four matches during the World Cup which included a semi-final. The stadium was confirmed to be the host of the final when the final stadiums for the World Cup was confirmed on the 31 March 2021.

Built for the 2000 Summer Olympics, it opened in March 1999. In addition to the opening and closing ceremonies and the track and field events, the stadium hosted the men's football gold medal match. The venue was also chosen as a venue for the men's 2015 AFC Asian Cup, where it hosted seven matches including the final, which Australia won against South Korea to win the tournament for the first time. It was also the host of the 2005 shootout victory over Uruguay in the OFC–CONMEBOL playoff, which qualified the Socceroos for the 2006 World Cup, their first appearance since 1974.

== Route to the final ==
=== Spain ===
Spain's route to the final
Phase	Opponent	Result
1	Costa Rica	3–0
2	Zambia	5–0
3	Japan	0–4
R16	Switzerland	5–1
QF	Netherlands	2–1 (a.e.t.)
SF	Sweden	2–1

Spain first qualified to a major women's tournament in 1997, reaching the semi-finals of their first European Championship, and qualified for their first Women's World Cup in 2015. Their previous best performance in the Women's World Cup was elimination in the round of 16 in 2019.

Heading into the tournament, Spain was ranked sixth in the FIFA Women's World Ranking. They were drawn in group C with Costa Rica, Zambia and 2011 champions Japan. Their opening match of the World Cup was against Costa Rica saw an own goal from Costa Rican player Valeria del Campo before goals from Aitana Bonmatí and Esther González in the space of four minutes secured a 3–0 victory. In the following match day, Spain booked a spot in the knockout stage with a 5–0 over Zambia with the opening goal being scored in the ninth minute by Teresa Abelleira before two goals from Alba Redondo and Jennifer Hermoso who was playing her 100th match got the victory. The final match day against Japan saw their Spanish be counterattacked with two goals from Japanese striker Hinata Miyazawa giving Japan a 4–0 win and placing Spain in second place for the group.

In the round of 16, Spain took on Group A winners Switzerland. Bonmatí scored the opening goal in the 7th minute before an own goal from Laia Codina who back-passed to Cata Coll which gave the equaliser for Switzerland. The following 30 minutes saw Spain score three goals with Redondo, Bonmati and Codina all scoring to give Spain a 4–1 lead at half-time. After Switzerland almost a second goal from Meriame Terchoun, Spain sealed up the match with a fifth coming from Hermoso and securing a spot into the quarter-finals for the first time. Spain's quarter-final opponent was against the Netherlands who finished runner-up at the 2019 World Cup. The opening half saw the Spanish have a goal disallowed while the Dutch had a penalty being waved away. In the 81st minute, Mariona Caldentey scored from the penalty spot to give Spain the early lead after Stefanie van der Gragt had a hand touch the ball. Van der Gragt, who moved forward, got the equaliser nine minutes later with an assist from Victoria Pelova, putting the game into extra time. On the 111th minute, Salma Paralluelo scored the match winner and booked a semi-final spot. In the semis at Eden Park, Spain faced Sweden. They scored first through Paralluelo, before conceding an equaliser by Rebecka Blomqvist. Just a minute later, Olga Carmona scored a wonderful goal to send Spain to only its second senior World Cup final ever and the first since the men's 2010 triumph over the Netherlands in Johannesburg.

=== England ===
England's route to the final
Phase	Opponent	Result
1	Haiti	1–0
2	Denmark	1–0
3	China	6–1
R16	Nigeria	0–0 (a.e.t.) (4–2 p)
QF	Colombia	2–1
SF	Australia	3–1

England first qualified to a major women's tournament in 1984, finishing as runners-up in the European Championship. They first qualified for the Women's World Cup in 1995. Their previous best performance in the tournament was finishing third in 2015.

Heading into the tournament, the Lionesses had not only won their first major trophy at Women's Euro 2022 as hosts but also had gone on to defeat Copa América Femenina winners Brazil on penalties at Wembley in the first Women's Finalissima. They had lost once with Sarina Wiegman as manager – a 2–0 friendly defeat to Australia in Brentford – and entered the Women's World Cup ranked fourth in the FIFA Women's World Ranking. They were drawn in Group D with Haiti, Denmark, and 1999 runners-up China. In the first two games, England won 1–0 against both Haiti and Denmark; the winning goals were a penalty from Georgia Stanway and a goal from Lauren James. Needing a point to win the group, England defeated China 6–1 with James scoring two goals.

In the round of 16, England faced group B runners-up Nigeria. During the match, the English were outplayed against the Nigerians. After initially getting a yellow card, James was then sent off after a VAR check for stepping on Michelle Alozie's back. After a goalless 120 minutes, the match went into penalties. After Stanway's shot went wide, the next four penalties were slotted in and with Nigeria missing two in return, England won the shoot-out 4–2. England next match was against Colombia who were playing in their first quarter-final at the World Cup. After Leicy Santos scored, England quickly equalised through Hemp before the first half ended. A 63rd-minute goal from Alessia Russo won the Lionesses a spot in the semis to face co-hosts Australia. Ella Toone scored first, but Australia equalised through Sam Kerr. Hemp and Russo then scored to secure England a first Women's World Cup final and only its second senior World Cup final ever, the first since the men's 1966 triumph over West Germany in London.

== Pre-match ==
=== Officials ===
On 18 August 2023, FIFA named American official Tori Penso as the referee for the final. She became the first American referee to officiate a World Cup final after previously being the head referee for four matches of the World Cup including the semi-final between Australia and England, thus becoming the third referee ever and the first since Ivan Eklind in the 1934 men's World Cup to officiate a single World Cup semi-final and the final. Penso had been a FIFA international referee since 2021, refereed the 2021 NWSL Championship Game and had also become the first female referee in Major League Soccer history. Her assistants, Brooke Mayo and Kathryn Nesbitt, were also from the United States. They were joined by fourth official Yoshimi Yamashita of Japan. Tatiana Guzman led the video assistant referee team. Guzman was assisted by Pol van Boekel, Ella De Vries, and Armando Villareal. Carol Anne Chenard and Drew Fischer served as standby VARs.

=== Team selection ===
From their 2022 Women's Euro team that beat Spain in Brighton and Hove before winning that tournament, England could not call up captain Leah Williamson, player of the tournament and top scorer Beth Mead, or Fran Kirby due to knee injuries. The World Cup squad included some returning senior players and new young players instead. One of the young players called up after the 2022 Euro, Lauren James, was available to play in the final after a straight red card against Nigeria in the round of 16 resulted in her being suspended for the quarter-final and semi-final.

Following the 2022 Euro, a group of 15 Spain players boycotted matches due to a dispute with the Royal Spanish Football Federation (RFEF) and manager Jorge Vilda. Several continued to boycott, with others excluded, and only 3 of the 15 were included in the World Cup squad. Two-time reigning Ballon d'Or Féminin winner Alexia Putellas was available for the tournament after recovering from an ACL injury. Oihane Hernández was available for the final after having accumulated two yellow cards and missing the semi-final.

Both of the teams were considered golden generations of the women's game in their countries, though each missing key players through the injuries and boycott.

The combined tournament squads of England and Spain featured eleven players who, at the time the match was played, were signed to Barcelona; ten (eight for Spain, two for England) played in the final. (Note: Including returning transfer Ona Batlle and Laia Codina, who was reported to be leaving the club in the days before the match.) The teammates had joked about meeting each other in the final, without truly expecting it. Ahead of the match, the awareness of each others' strengths and weaknesses was a point of discussion, as were the Barcelona players who had refused to play for Spain.

=== Representatives ===
Both England (as part of the United Kingdom and Commonwealth) and Spain are constitutional monarchies and are often represented at sporting events by members of their royal families. At the time, the president of the Royal Spanish Football Federation (RFEF) was Luis Rubiales, while William, Prince of Wales was president of The Football Association (The FA). Despite his position in football and as royalty, William said he would not travel to Australia (of which he is also royalty) to watch England in the final, citing the carbon footprint that would be generated.

Rubiales had accompanied the Spain team throughout much of their time in New Zealand and Australia, with a report in Relevo suggesting he had imposed his presence around the players too closely, behaving more like a teammate than the president, and had normalised a level of paternalism and condescension. Spain's Queen Letizia travelled to Australia for the final with her younger daughter, the Infanta Sofía. Included in the trip over her sister, Sofía is known to be a big fan of football as well as reportedly an aspiring defensive midfielder. The director of women's football for Barcelona, Xavi Puig, was also in attendance and allowed to accompany the Spain team, though stated to be supporting all the club's players.

=== Closing ceremony ===
The tournament's closing ceremony took place ahead of the final, featuring a Welcome to Country, and a performance from Australian singer Tones and I.

== Match ==
=== Summary ===
The match was described as a "pulsating game", difficult but with Spain creating more clear chances by the end.

England started the match intensely, with Spain patient; the first shot of the game came in the 5th minute from England forward Lauren Hemp shooting straight at Spain goalkeeper Cata Coll. Spain took advantage of the transition a minute later to launch a counterattack that saw centre forward Alba Redondo send in a loose cross. England then created chances with balls played through the lines to centre forward Alessia Russo; when Spain got the ball they held possession without taking advantage. After England holding midfielder Keira Walsh was fouled by Salma Paralluelo attempting to dispossess her, the England team created their best chance of the match, with Hemp having a clear shot on goal in the 16th minute but striking the crossbar. The match "sprung into life" when Spain made their first substantial attack a minute later, with vice-captain Olga Carmona crossing a ball to Paralluelo, who could not connect fully but sent the ball into the path of Redondo: England goalkeeper Mary Earps made a quick-moving save to catch the shot from Redondo. Over the next few minutes, the match was played from end to end, with chances in for both teams.

When England right wing-back Lucy Bronze attempted a dribble through the midfield, Spanish players dispossessed her and the ball was sent to Carmona, who took a tight-angled low shot past Earps and into the right corner of the net, scoring the only goal of the match in the 29th minute. Spanish media noted that although Spain's team featured more players from Barcelona than any other club, the goal did not come from possession play but from a quick counterattack, more like the play of Real Madrid, which the Spain women's team had increasingly played like. England struggled after conceding the goal, allowing a confident Spain more chances, though Spain's only shot on target in the rest of the half came when defender Irene Paredes was given space in the box to head the ball from a free kick in the 37th minute, which Earps kept out. England recovered close to the end of the first half, and a long ball to Hemp was crossed in for Ella Toone with an empty goal in the 42nd minute, though Toone failed to connect and the ball was recovered by Spain; the same sequence was used minutes later, with Spain sending players into the box to clear Hemp's cross. In the one minute of added time at the end of the first half, Paralluelo also hit the crossbar.

Returning from half time, England changed formation from the 3–5–2 that they had adopted in the group stage, returning to the 4–3–3 they had consistently used under Wiegman throughout her tenure. Wingers Lauren James and Chloe Kelly came on for left wing-back Rachel Daly and Russo. The change initially saw England improve defensively and create better opportunities, including the fullbacks continuing to play forward; Spain substituted centre forward Redondo for defensive player Oihane Hernández in the 60th minute, with Spain attacking midfielder Aitana Bonmatí trying to score from range in the 62nd minute. England's confidence waned and Spain's was bolstered when Walsh conceded a penalty for accidental handball in the box while defending a corner in the 65th minute. After a lengthy VAR review, Spain forward Jennifer Hermoso took the penalty in the 70th minute, with the shot saved by Earps. Spain defender Laia Codina was treated and eventually substituted with an injury in the 73rd minute, being replaced by captain Ivana Andrés. England briefly found form again after the substitution, with James able to send in a tight-angled shot narrowly saved by Coll, but were hampered by defender Alex Greenwood receiving a head injury from Paralluelo's high knee in the 78th minute. Greenwood managed to continue, with play resuming in the 82nd minute and England playing desperately.

Spain had the better of the game for the rest of the 90, and when Hermoso required treatment, England replaced Toone with striker Bethany England in the 87th minute. An attempt from Hermoso was impressively blocked by Jess Carter in the 89th minute, before Alexia Putellas was brought on for Mariona Caldentey in the 90th. Accounting for the VAR and treatment time, there were 13 minutes of added time at the end of the match. England continued to play desperately, leaving defensive gaps, with Earps saving a low shot from Spain fullback Ona Batlle in the 92nd minute. Spain used their control to slow the game and frustrate England, with England's only chance in the added time being a weak Kelly cross cleared by Spain's ample defense; Spain had their own chances in added time, with a sliding block from Bronze preventing Paralluelo's shot in the 98th minute. England's attacks led to a corner taken in the 104th minute, which was held by Coll and the match ended.

=== Incidents ===
In the 23rd minute of the match, Johnson Wen, an Australian man, ran onto the field wearing an anti-Putin t-shirt, halting play briefly while England was waiting to take a free kick. The free kick was gathered by Spain, who counterattacked unsuccessfully.

During a celebration when Spain scored, manager Vilda hugged a female assistant; initially having his hand on her shoulder, he appeared to move it down to her breast and hold this a moment before removing his hand. The moment was captured on camera and re-examined after the match and an incident of Rubiales kissing a player without consent.

Near the end of the match, England player Bronze approached Vilda at the side of the pitch and remonstrated him. Coming after several fouls on England, and when Vilda and his staff were crowding the touchline, Bronze told Australian media that she "just told them to sit down".

=== Details ===
20 August 2023
20:00 UTC+10

Spain	1–0	England
Carmona 29'	Report

Stadium Australia, Sydney
Attendance: 75,784
Referee: Tori Penso (United States)

Spain	England

GK	23	Cata Coll
RB	2	Ona Batlle
CB	4	Irene Paredes
CB	14	Laia Codina		(substituted off) 73'
LB	19	Olga Carmona (c)
DM	3	Teresa Abelleira
CM	6	Aitana Bonmatí
CM	10	Jennifer Hermoso
RF	17	Alba Redondo		(substituted off) 60'
CF	18	Salma Paralluelo	(yellow card) 78'
LF	8	Mariona Caldentey		(substituted off) 90'
Substitutions:
DF	12	Oihane Hernández		(substituted on) 60'
DF	5	Ivana Andrés		(substituted on) 73'
FW	11	Alexia Putellas		(substituted on) 90'
Manager:
Jorge Vilda

GK	1	Mary Earps
CB	16	Jess Carter
CB	6	Millie Bright (c)
CB	5	Alex Greenwood
RM	2	Lucy Bronze
CM	8	Georgia Stanway
CM	4	Keira Walsh
CM	10	Ella Toone		(substituted off) 87'
LM	9	Rachel Daly		(substituted off) 46'
CF	23	Alessia Russo		(substituted off) 46'
CF	11	Lauren Hemp	(yellow card) 55'
Substitutions:
FW	7	Lauren James		(substituted on) 46'
FW	18	Chloe Kelly		(substituted on) 46'
FW	19	Bethany England		(substituted on) 87'
Manager:
(Netherlands) Sarina Wiegman

Player of the Match:
Olga Carmona (Spain)

Assistant referees:
Brooke Mayo (United States)
Kathryn Nesbitt (United States)
Fourth official:
Yoshimi Yamashita (Japan)
Reserve assistant referee:
Mijensa Rensch (Suriname)
Video assistant referee:
Tatiana Guzmán (Nicaragua)
Assistant video assistant referee:
Pol van Boekel (Netherlands)
Offside video assistant referee:
Ella De Vries (Belgium)
Support video assistant referee:
Armando Villarreal (United States)

Match rules

- 90 minutes.
- 30 minutes of extra time if necessary.
- Penalty shoot-out if scores still level.
- Maximum of twelve named substitutes.
- Maximum of five substitutions, with a sixth allowed in extra time. (Note: Each team was given only three opportunities to make substitutions, with a fourth opportunity in extra time, excluding substitutions made at half-time, before the start of extra time and at half-time in extra time.)

=== Statistics ===
Overall
Statistic	Spain	England
Goals scored	1	0
Total shots	14	7
Shots on target	5	3
Ball possession	57%	43%
Corner kicks	7	3
Fouls committed	9	15
Offsides	0	5
Yellow cards	1	1
Red cards	0	0

== Aftermath ==
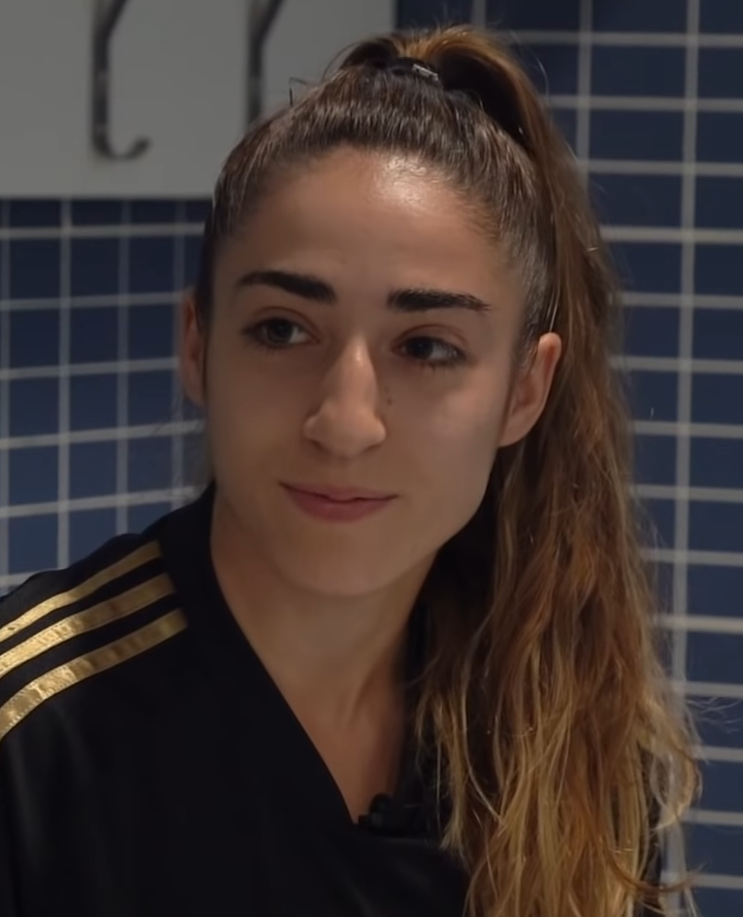
Player of the match Olga Carmona

=== Teams ===
Spain became the second country to have won both men's and women's World Cups and also the second country—after Brazil's male teams between 2003 and 2005—to simultaneously hold all three World Cups of the same gender (senior, under-20, and under-17). (Note: Brazil won the 2002 FIFA World Cup, 2003 FIFA World Youth Championship, and 2003 FIFA U-17 World Championship. Spain won the 2023 FIFA Women's World Cup, 2022 FIFA U-20 Women's World Cup, and 2022 FIFA U-17 Women's World Cup.) Salma Paralluelo became the first player of any gender to have won all three World Cups of the same gender. Spain's captain for the match and goalscorer Olga Carmona was named player of the match. After she scored, she lifted her shirt to reveal an undershirt with "Merchi" written on it, the name of her friend's mother who had recently died. In the press room after the match, she dedicated the victory to her. She was told shortly afterward that her own father had died before the match.

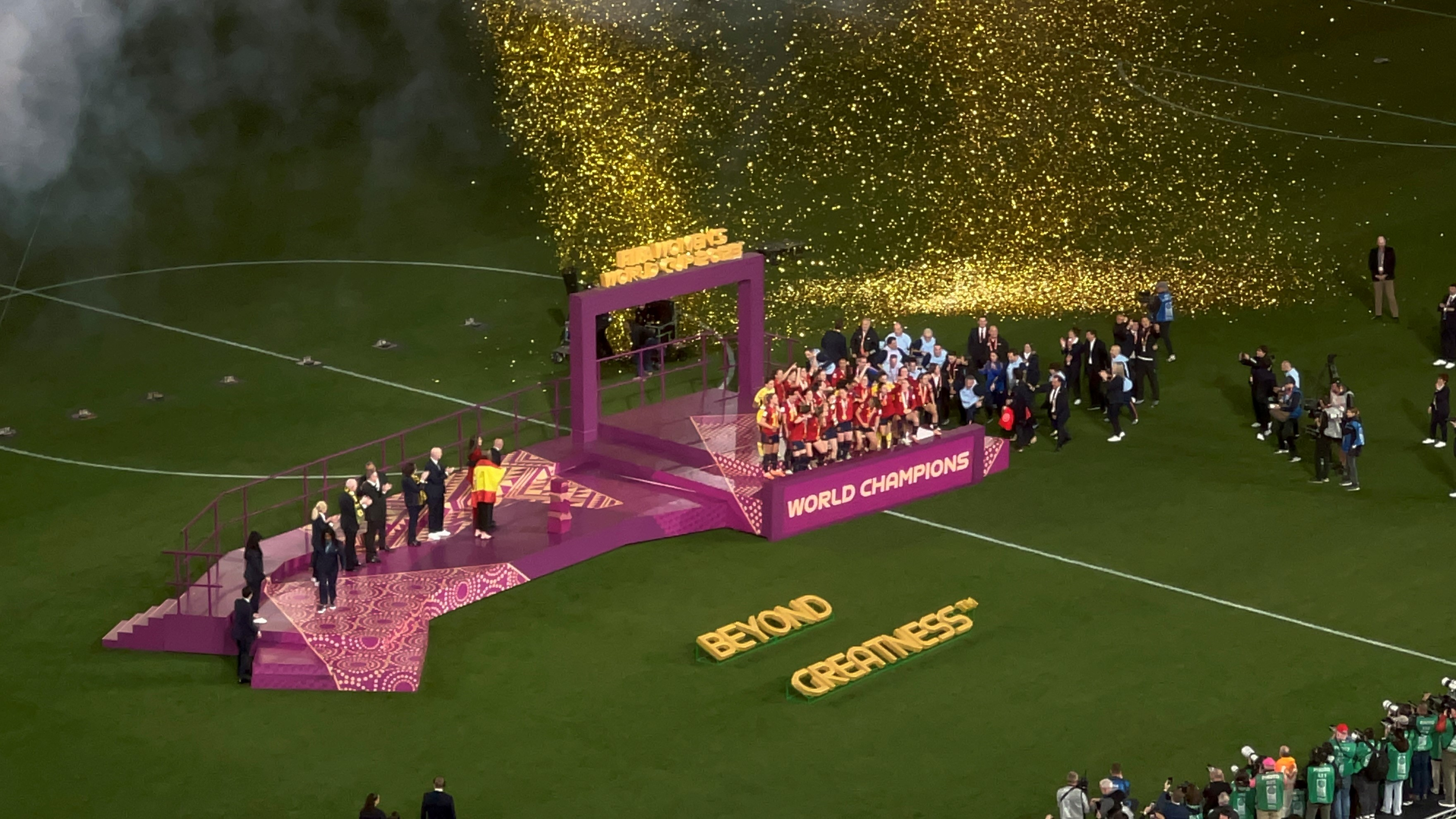
Spanish players celebrating on the presentation stage

The Spain team boarded an overnight flight and returned to Madrid for a public celebration on the evening of 21 August, held at Madrid Río park with several thousand in attendance. The team's victory dominated the front pages of newspapers on 21 August, with emphatic headlines.

The England team stayed overnight in Sydney before returning to London, set to arrive on 22 August; the Women's Super League would not begin its season until October. Keir Starmer, the UK Leader of the Opposition, called for the team to be recognised with Honours for reaching a World Cup final, something which has precedent in men's sport. The match was also featured on the front pages of all British newspapers on 21 August, mostly using images of the team looking disappointed and headlines expressing pride at the achievement of reaching a final.

The teams would later meet again at the UEFA Women's Euro 2025 final, which was won by England on a penalty shootout.

=== Rubiales affair ===
During the medal ceremony, RFEF president Luis Rubiales kissed Jennifer Hermoso on the lips. The action drew criticism, particularly towards the continued sexism in the sport, and calls for Rubiales's resignation. In a separate incident at the end of the match, Rubiales was filmed pointing to the Spain players before grabbing his crotch, with the obscene gesture further criticised as he was standing next to the teenage Infanta Sofía.

After Hermoso had said she did not expect or like the kiss, Rubiales entered the players' dressing room, reportedly throwing his arm around Hermoso and joking about marrying her in Ibiza. While on a layover returning from Australia, Rubiales published an apology video in which he said that he had no bad intentions and was sorry for distracting from the celebration, saying: "I have to apologise, learn from this, and understand that when you are president you have to be more careful."

Rubiales faced heavy criticism for his actions, and calls for him to resign came from various Spanish footballing bodies as well as the government. He and Vilda tried to make Hermoso support Rubiales, issuing a fake statement when she would not. Hermoso issued a statement through her union, Futpro, with the union saying the kiss was unacceptable and that they were working on seeing it punished.

The RFEF called an extraordinary general meeting for 25 August.

== Broadcasting ==
In Spain, the World Cup was broadcast by Televisión Española (TVE), with an average of 5.6 million viewers and a peak of 8.9 million. In addition, public streaming service RTVE Play gathered almost one million viewers, with a total of 2.1 million views. Post-match celebrations were followed by 6.2 million people, with a peak of 8.7 million.

In the United Kingdom, the final was watched by a peak audience of 14.8 million and average of 13.3 million on BBC One and ITV1. The BBC reported 12 million peak viewers on BBC One, with an additional 3.9 million views on BBC iPlayer and BBC Sport.

The match was watched by a peak audience of 5.54 million viewers in Australia. It also set a record for the most viewers in the U.S. for a Women's World Cup final not involving the United States national team, with a peak audience of 2.45 million on Fox and a combined average of 2.1 million on Fox and Telemundo. The figures were a 88 percent decline from the 2019 final due to the early morning start time and early elimination of the United States.

== See also ==
- England at the FIFA Women's World Cup
- Spain at the FIFA Women's World Cup
- UEFA Euro 2024 final
- It's All Over: The Kiss That Changed Spanish Football
