= Event technician =

Profession

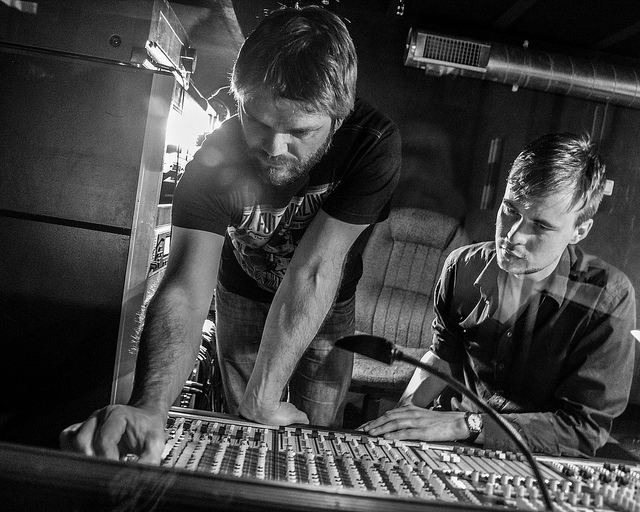
Event technicians at work.

The job event technology specialist or event technician is an occupation acquired with a state recognized apprenticeship. Its focal points are the assembly, dismantling and implementation of technical parts of different kinds of events.

== Job description ==
Event technology specialists are responsible for assembling, dismantling and operating stage and scenic constructions, as well as lighting, projection and sound systems. This apprenticeship has been existing in Germany since 1998. The job profile was re-arranged in 2002. Since then, there has been more focus on electrotechnical components. Additional new focal points were Assembly and Implementation, as well as Assembly and Organisation (specifically for trade shows). Since the changes in the system of apprenticeships in 2016, the job “event technician” has been categorized as Monoberuf, which is a term for an apprenticeship without academic specialization in subject or focus areas. This means that a possible specialization can only be done after the finished apprenticeship. After successfully completing the three-year apprenticeship and a minimum of one year working experience, the specialist workers can then decide to become a master craftsman for event technology. To do so, they are required to pass an examination with different specialization opportunities like stage and studio, lighting, and hall. The differences between the job description of event technicians in Austria is insignificant, however it was officially made an occupation there in 2005. Since September 2011, the apprenticeship in Austria edited its curriculum.

== Apprenticeship ==
Both Germany and Austria offer this apprenticeship as part of the dual education system, which combines the apprenticeship in a company and a vocational education. The whole apprenticeship has a duration of 3 years in Germany, and 3½ years in Austria. After finishing their apprenticeship, Austrian apprentices can continue to complete another apprenticeship to become a master craftsman.

== Tasks ==
The tasks of event technicians can be summarized to the following:

- Efficient and professional handling of technical equipment and technology
- Economical and customer-oriented behaviour
- Creative and artistic skills
- Ensuring the safety of events
- Teamwork and flexibility due to changing places and unusual working hours

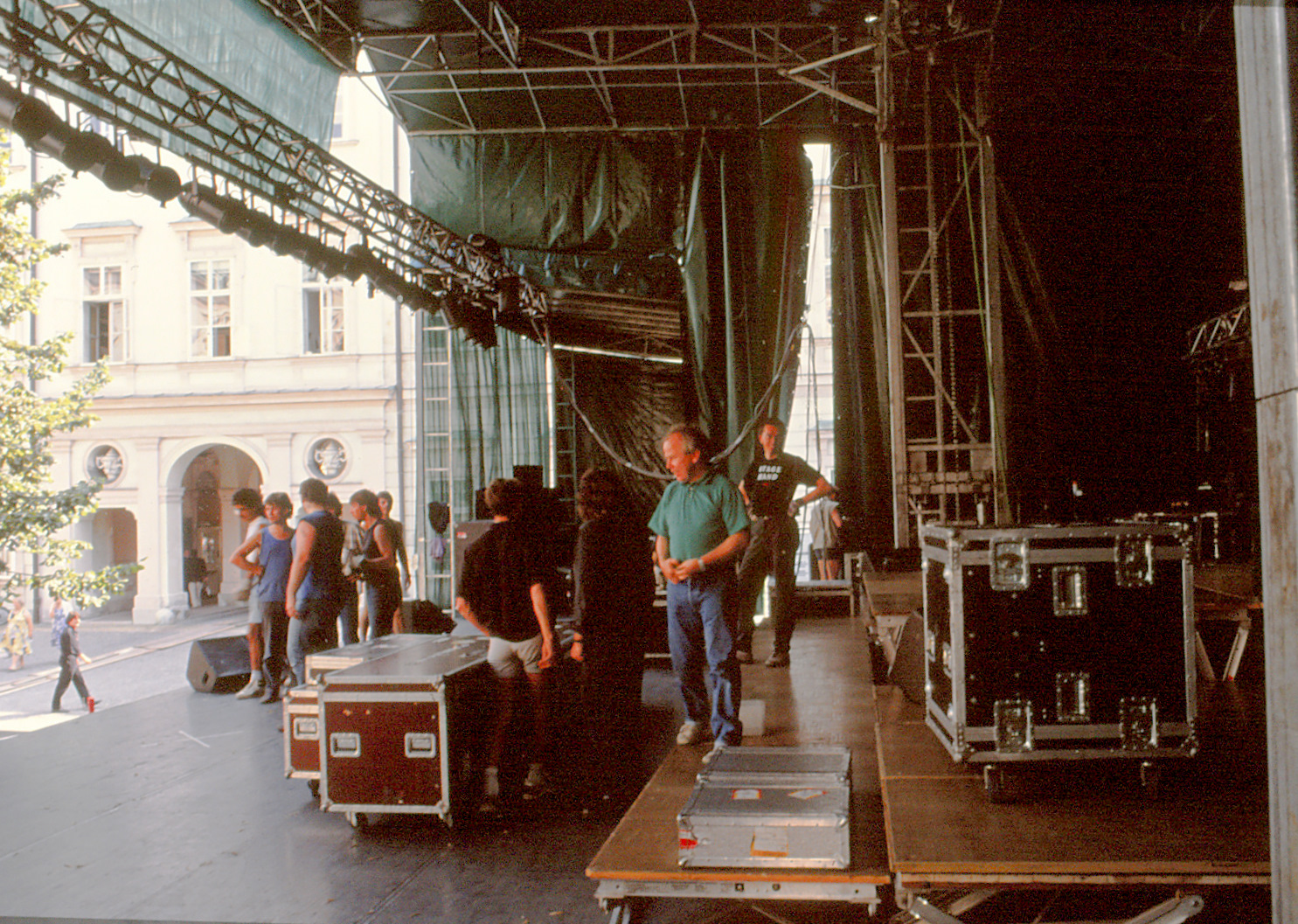

=== Efficient and professional handling of technical equipment and technology ===
One of the main tasks of an event technician is assembly, dismantling and operating technical equipment and stage parts needed for events. This includes but is not limited to mixing consoles, spotlights, microphones, amplifiers and other stage equipment like scaffolding, trusses, exhibition pieces and further technical elements. Due to rapidly advancing technological development, event technicians need to keep their knowledge up to date.

=== Economical and customer-oriented behavior ===
Since event technicians work with expensive equipment mostly combined with strict time tables, this job requires a professional end efficient work ethic. Clients and customers expect them to work carefully and speedy while complying with given safety regulations. Due to the competitiveness of this work field, customer-oriented and budget-conscious work is expected, while still being able to recruit more jobs and maintaining one's employment.

=== Creative and artistic skills ===
The use of lighting, sound mixing and others usually requires sensitivity to understand the concept and intention of the event in order to artistically accompany the event in the right way. Redesigning and reorganizing event locations, e.g. lighting for architectural structures or stage productions, is a frequent scenario that requires creative skill.

=== Ensuring the safety of events ===
This includes the safety of the organizers of the event, the audience, the location, and the equipment. Two different areas of safety can be distinguished for event technicians:

- Technical and statical safety for built structures in the air and on the ground
- Fire protection, construction law and to a certain degree occupational safety and health, called Eventsafety.

Due to new regulations (VStättV and BGV C1), the responsibility was transferred onto the event technician. Since 2008 the field of eventsafety in public spaces has been changed. These changes allow for better task allocation. Evacuation and implementation of emergency procedures are tasks for the security personnel, while the event technician is responsible for the stage area including electricity, flying loads and sound & laser emissions. Another part of an event technician's area of responsibility is electrotechnical safety, which influenced the content-related change of the apprenticeship to include the job training for a qualified electrician into the event technician apprenticeship.

=== Teamwork and flexibility due to changing places and unusual working hour ===
Event technicians must be able to work with possibly changing teams. Especially when working at bigger events, multiple external and auxiliary workers, companies, and other professional groups as well as artists and actors, are likely to be present and require functional teamwork from the event technician. Teamwork and sensitive task-oriented work are important qualities of event technicians. Additionally, special, and temporal flexibility are needed. Spatial flexibility due to changing work places causing a lot of traveling. Temporal flexibility because of unusual working hours given the occasional need to be the last person at an event and working during the weekends, at night and during holidays.
