= Hiroshi Ohashi =

Japanese footballer and manager

Hiroshi Ohashi 大橋 浩司
Personal information
- Full name: Hiroshi Ohashi
- Date of birth: October 27, 1959 (age 67)
- Place of birth: Iga, Mie, Japan

Youth career
- 1975–1977: Nabari Kikyogaoka High School

College career
Years	Team	Apps	(Gls)
1978–1981	Osaka University H&SS		

Managerial career
- 2004: Albirex Niigata Singapore
- 2004–2007: Japan Women

Hiroshi Ohashi (大橋 浩司, Ohashi Hiroshi; born October 27, 1959) is a former Japanese football player and manager. He managed Japan women's national team.

== Coaching career ==
Ohashi was born in Iga on October 27, 1959. After graduating from Osaka University of Health and Sport Sciences, he became coach for youth team at Japan Football Association. In 2004, he became manager for Singaporean new club, Albirex Niigata Singapore. November 2004, he became manager for Japan women's national team. He managed for 2008 Summer Olympics qualification and qualified for 2008 Summer Olympics. He also managed for 2007 FIFA Women's World Cup.
