= Florencia Mandrile =

Argentine footballer (born 1988)

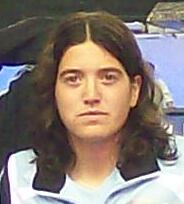

Personal information
- Full name: Florencia Mandrile Núñez
- Date of birth: 10 February 1988 (age 38)
- Place of birth: Laboulaye, Córdoba, Argentina
- Position: Midfielder

Senior career*
Years	Team	Apps	(Gls)
2008	San Lorenzo		

International career
2007–2008	Argentina	0 (?)	(0)
- * Club domestic league appearances and goals

Florencia Mandrile Núñez (born 10 February 1988) is an Argentine former footballer who played as a midfielder. She was part of the Argentina national team at the 2008 Summer Olympics.

== See also ==
- Argentina at the 2008 Summer Olympics
