= List of FIFA Women's World Cup winning managers =

FIFA Women's World Cup

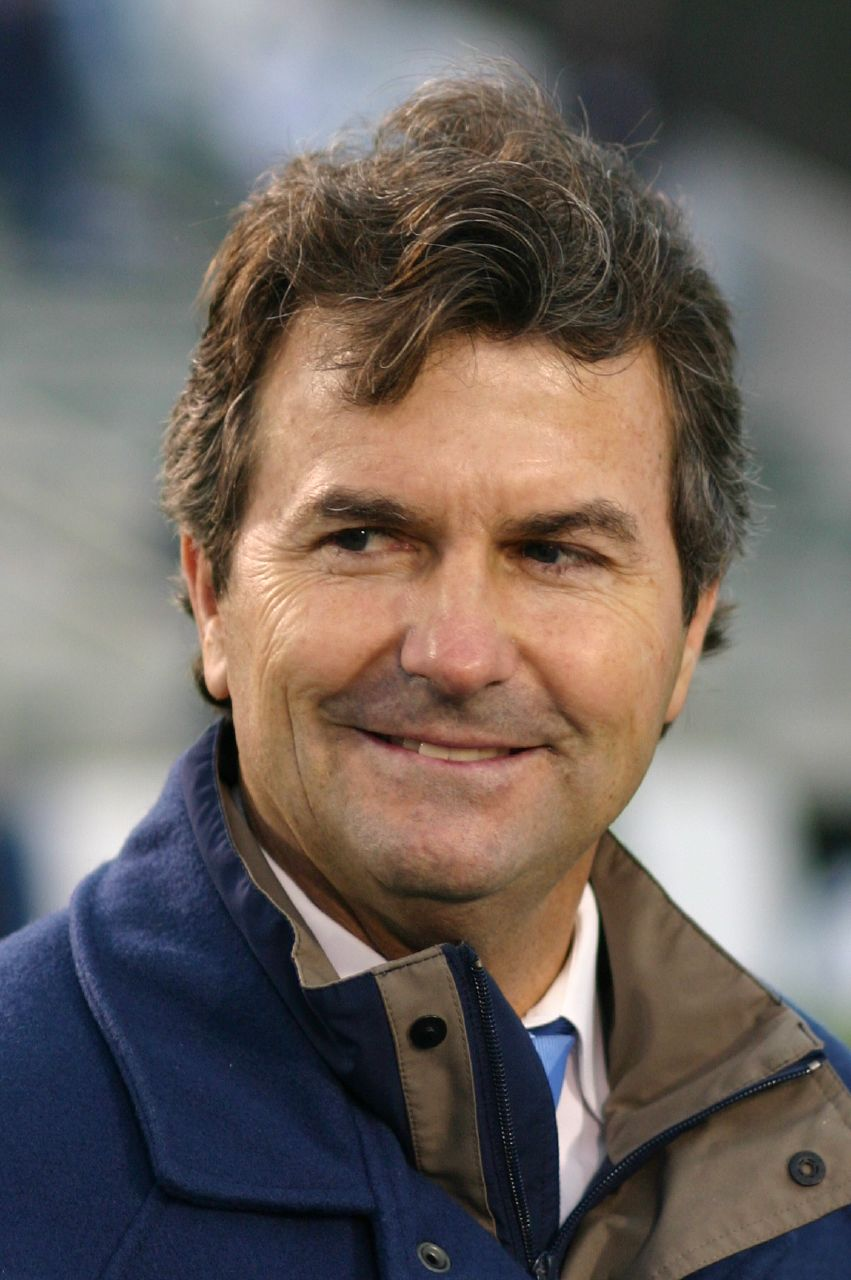
Anson Dorrance was the first World Cup winning manager.

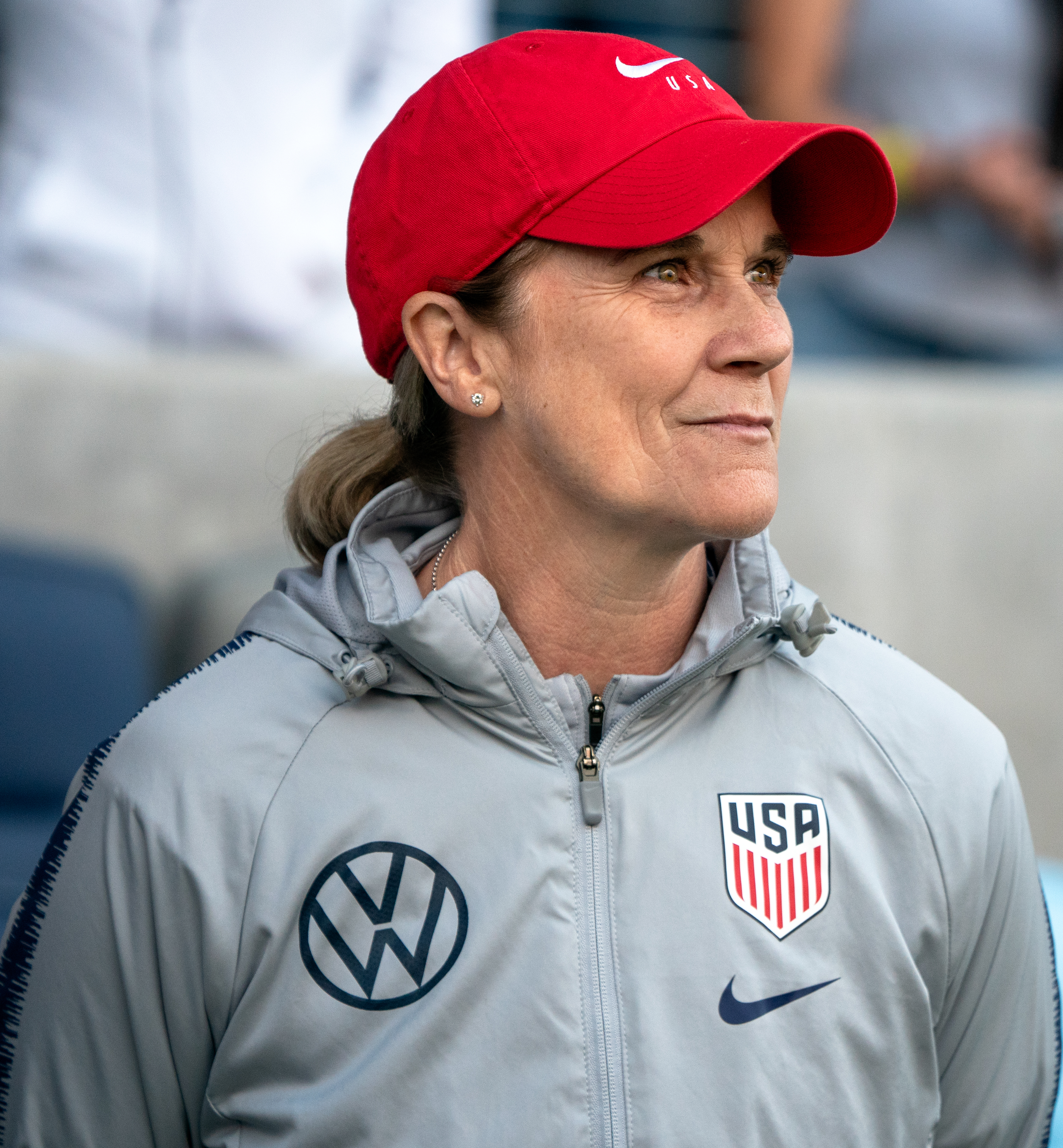
Jill Ellis is the only manager to have won the World Cup twice.

The FIFA Women's World Cup is considered the most prestigious women's association football tournament in the world. The nine World Cup tournaments have been won by five national teams. United States have won four times, followed by Germany with two titles, and Norway, Japan, and Spain with one title each.

Anson Dorrance led the United States national team to victory in the inaugural tournament in 1991. Jill Ellis is the only person who has won the World Cup twice as a manager, in 2015 and 2019 with United States. Eight different managers have won the World Cup and all winning managers led their own country's national team. Two other managers finished as winners once and runners-up once; Even Pellerud (winner in 1995, runners-up in 1991) for Norway, and Norio Sasaki (winner in 2011, runner-up in 2015) for Japan.

Even Pellerud holds the records for both most matches managed (25) and most matches won (16). Anson Dorrance is the youngest manager to win the World Cup, being 40 in 1991. Norio Sasaki is the oldest coach to win the World Cup, being aged 53 years and 54 days in 2011.

== Winning managers ==
Tournament	Winning manager	Nationality	Winning national team	Ref.
1991	Anson Dorrance	United States	United States	
1995	Even Pellerud	Norway	Norway	
1999	Tony DiCicco	United States	United States	
2003	Tina Theune-Meyer	Germany	Germany	
2007	Silvia Neid	Germany	Germany	
2011	Norio Sasaki	Japan	Japan	
2015	Jill Ellis	England; United States	United States	
2019	Jill Ellis	England; United States	United States	
2023	Jorge Vilda	Spain	Spain	

== By nationality ==
Nationality	Manager(s)	Number of wins
United States	3	4
Germany	2	2
Norway	1	1
Japan	1	1
England	1	1
Spain	1	1

== See also ==
- List of FIFA Women's World Cup winning players
