= Hongkou Football Stadium =

Football stadium in Shanghai, China

Hongkou Football Stadium 虹口足球场
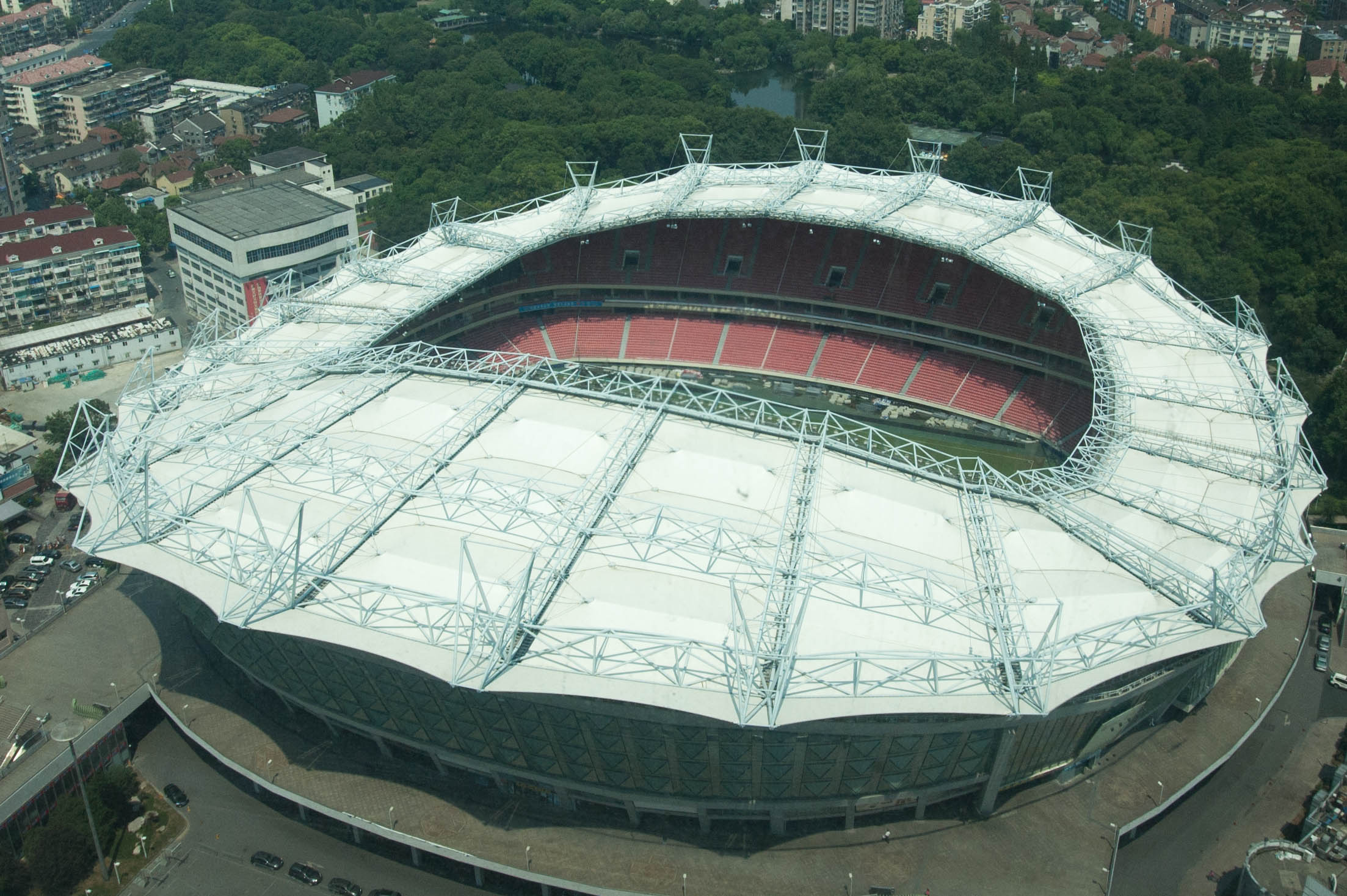
- Interactive map of Hongkou Football Stadium 虹口足球场
- Location: Shanghai, China
- Coordinates: 31°16′24″N 121°28′34″E
- Owner: Shanghai Government
- Operator: IRENA Group
- Capacity: 33,060
- Surface: Grass
- Public transit: Hongkou Football Stadium 3 8

Construction
- Groundbreaking: February 22, 1998
- Opened: March 14, 1999

Tenant
- Shanghai Shenhua (1994–1998, 1999–2006, 2008–2019)

Hongkou Football Stadium (simplified Chinese: 虹口足球场; traditional Chinese: 虹口足球場; pinyin: Hóngkǒu Zúqiúchǎng) is a football stadium in Shanghai, China. Located in Hongkou District, the stadium has a maximum capacity of 33,060. It is the first ever football stadium to be built in China. The stadium was re-built in 1999, over the previous 46-year-old Hongkou Stadium, a general use sports stadium now replaced by the Shanghai Stadium. It is adjacent to Lu Xun Park.

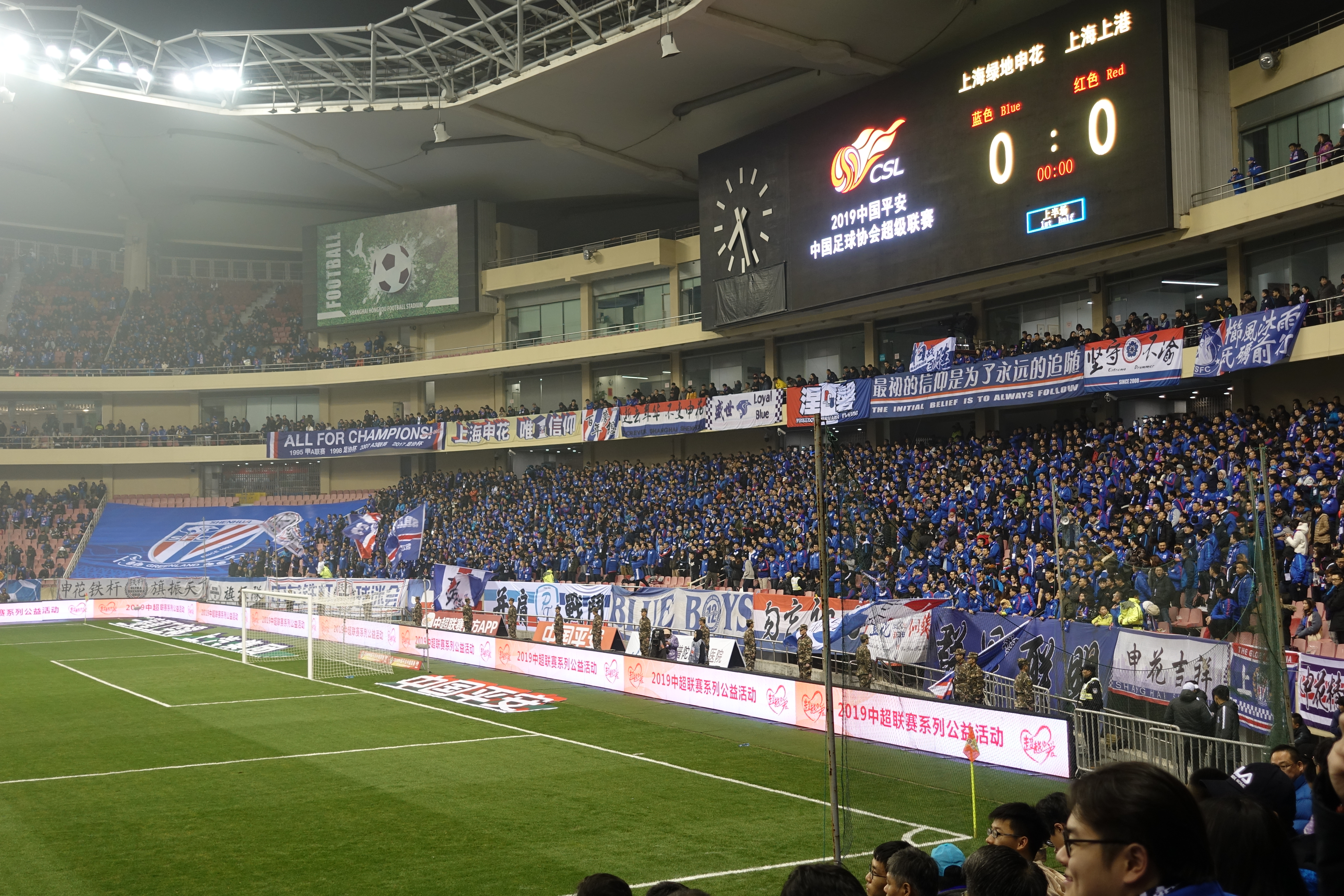
Hongkou Football Stadium interior in 2019

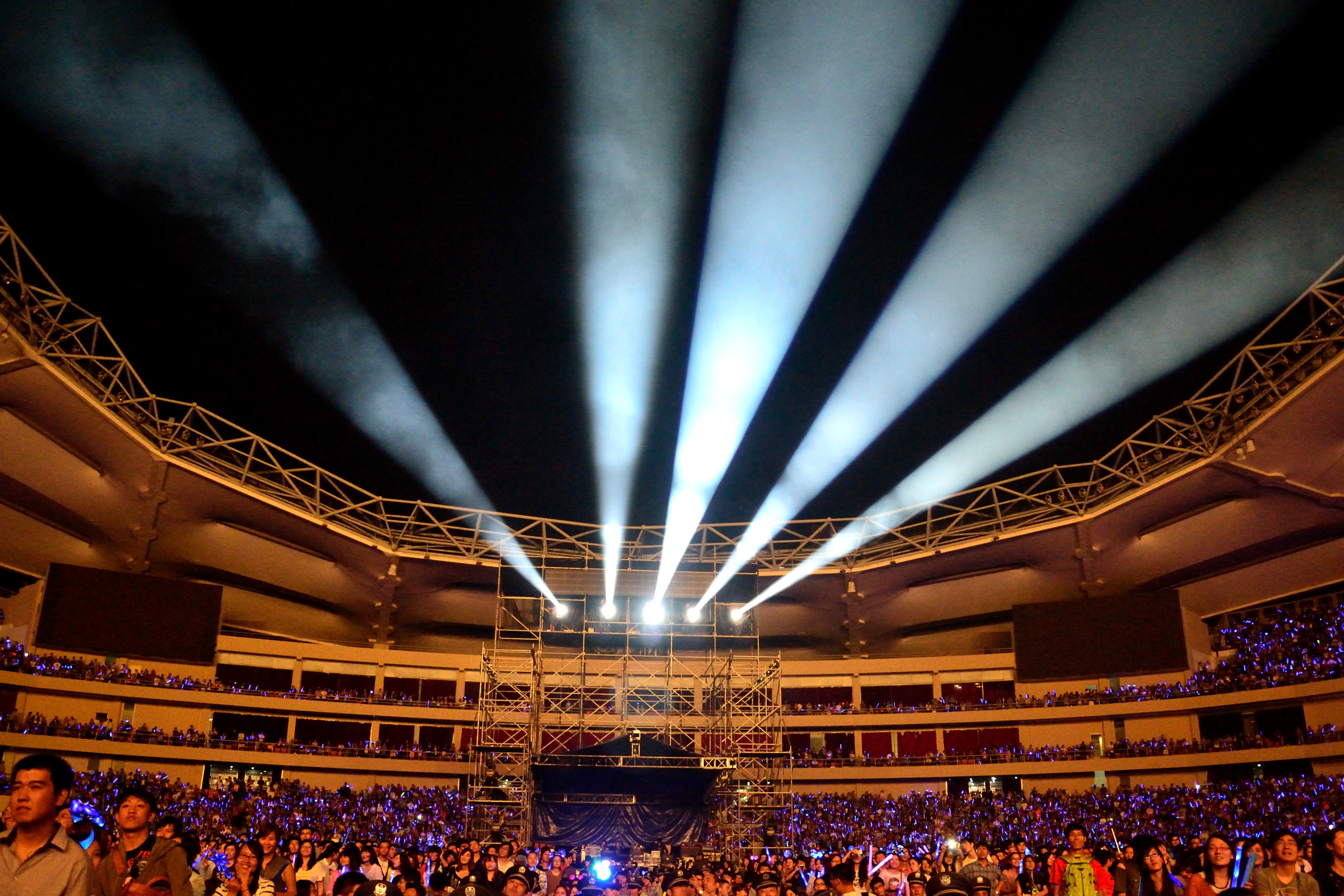
A concert held in the stadium in 2012

== History ==
The stadium has 3 squash courts inside and a climbing wall, which was rebuilt in early 2009. The stadium is currently used mostly for football matches and it is the home stadium of local football team Shanghai Shenhua F.C. It also hosted the final of the 2007 FIFA Women's World Cup. The stadium also was the home of Shanghai Guotai Jun'an Yongbo Women's F.C., a local women's football team, in 2016 season.

In 2013 Hongkou Football Stadium was the host of the National Electronic Sports Tournament (NEST).

== 2007 FIFA Women's World Cup matches ==
Date	Stage	Team	Res.	Team	Att.
September 10, 2007	Group A	Germany	11–0	Argentina	28,098
September 11, 2007	Group A	Japan	2–2	England	27,146
September 14, 2007	Group A	Argentina	0–1	Japan	27,730
September 14, 2007	Group A	England	0–0	Germany	27,730
September 18, 2007	Group B	Nigeria	0–1	United States	6,100
September 30, 2007	Third Place	Norway	1–4	United States	31,000
September 30, 2007	Final	Germany	2–0	Brazil	31,000

== Concerts ==
- Mariah Carey：November 12 & 14, 2003 – Charmbracelet World Tour
- Whitney Houston：July 22, 2004 – Soul Divas Tour
- Backstreet Boys: September 26, 2004
- S.H.E：October 30, 2004 – Fantasy Land World Tour
- Linkin Park: November 18, 2007 – Minutes to Midnight World Tour
- TVXQ: May 31, 2008 — O: The 2nd Asia Tour
- Kylie Minogue: November 29, 2008 – KylieX2008
- Mariah Carey: October 19, 2014 – The Elusive Chanteuse Show
- Linkin Park: July 22, 2015 – The Hunting Party Tour
- Mayday: December 2–8, 2017 – Life Tour
- Joker Xue: October 6–7, 2018 – Skyscraper World Tour
- Joker Xue: June 21–23, 2023 – Extraterrestrial World Tour
- Mariah Carey: May 16-17, 2025 – The Celebration of Mimi
- One Ok Rock: May 9, 2026 – One Ok Rock "Detox" Asia Tour

== See also ==
- List of football stadiums in China
- List of stadiums in China
- Lists of stadiums

Preceded by Home Depot Center; Carson	FIFA Women's World Cup; Final Venue; 2007	Succeeded by Commerzbank-Arena; Frankfurt
