= 2007 FIFA Women's World Cup final =

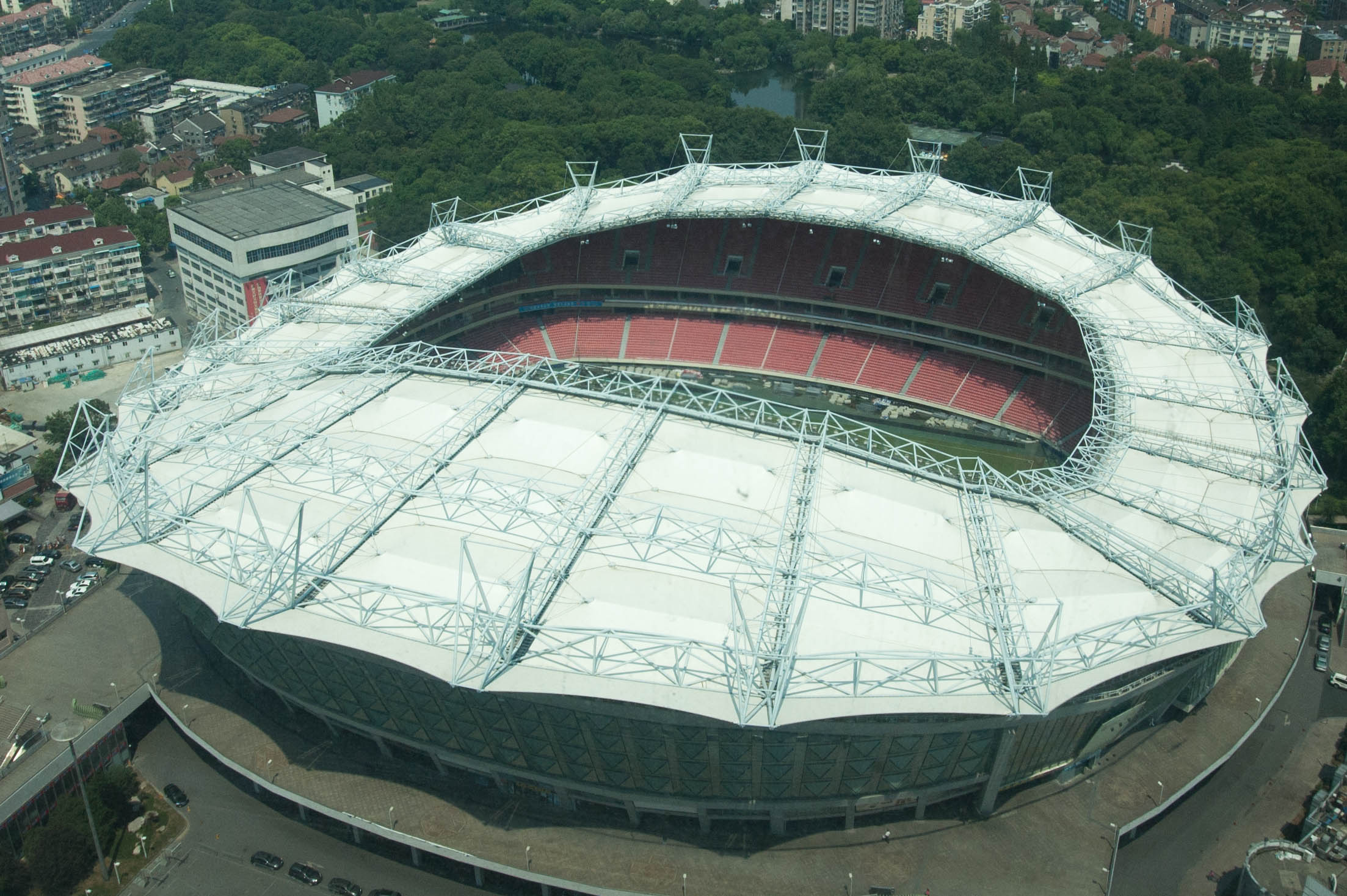
- Hongkou Football Stadium in Shanghai hosted the final.
- Event: 2007 FIFA Women's World Cup
Germany	Brazil
2	0
- Date: 30 September 2007
- Venue: Hongkou Football Stadium, Shanghai
- Player of the Match: Nadine Angerer (Germany)
- Referee: Tammy Ogston (Australia)
- Attendance: 31,000

The 2007 FIFA Women's World Cup final was an association football match which determined the winner of the 2007 FIFA Women's World Cup, contested by the women's national teams of the member associations of FIFA. It was played on 30 September 2007 at the Hongkou Football Stadium, in Shanghai, China and won by Germany, who defeated Brazil 2–0.

== Finalists ==
The match was between Germany, who had won the previous Women's World Cup final and Brazil, who had never won a major world title, or indeed even reached the finals of a Women's World Cup. This was the first time in the history of the Women's World Cup that a European and South American had met each other in the final. Germany had not conceded a single goal in the whole competition whereas Brazil were free-scoring. Led by striker Marta, who had scored 7 goals, Brazil had scored seventeen goals in their route to the final, including four against title-rivals United States in the semi-finals. It was considered as "the rematch of the 2002 FIFA World Cup Final", except it was the men's teams.

== Route to the final ==
Germany
Round
Brazil
Opponent
Result
Group stage
Opponent
Result
Argentina
11–0
Match 1
New Zealand
5–0
England
0–0
Match 2
China
4–0
Japan
2–0
Match 3
Denmark
1–0
Group A winners

Pos	Team	Pld	Pts
1	Germany	3	7
2	England	3	5
3	Japan	3	4
4	Argentina	3	0

Source: FIFA
Final standing
Group D winners

Pos	Team	Pld	Pts
1	Brazil	3	9
2	China (H)	3	6
3	Denmark	3	3
4	New Zealand	3	0

Source: FIFA
(H) Hosts
Opponent
Result
Knockout stage
Opponent
Result
North Korea
3–0
Quarterfinals
Australia
3–2
Norway
3–0
Semifinals
United States
4–0

== Match ==
=== Details ===
30 September 2007
20:00 CST

Germany	2–0	Brazil
Prinz 52'; Laudehr 86'	Report

Hongkou Football Stadium, Shanghai
Attendance: 31,000
Referee: Tammy Ogston (Australia)

Germany	Brazil

GK	1	Nadine Angerer
RB	2	Kerstin Stegemann
CB	5	Annike Krahn
CB	17	Ariane Hingst
LB	6	Linda Bresonik	(yellow card) 63'
CM	14	Simone Laudehr
CM	10	Renate Lingor
RW	18	Kerstin Garefrekes	(yellow card) 7'
AM	9	Birgit Prinz (c)
LW	7	Melanie Behringer		(substituted off) 74'
CF	8	Sandra Smisek		(substituted off) 80'
Substitutions:
FW	16	Martina Müller		(substituted in) 74'
MF	19	Fatmire Bajramaj		(substituted in) 80'
Manager:
Silvia Neid

GK	1	Andréia
CB	3	Aline (c)		(substituted off) 88'
CB	5	Renata Costa
CB	4	Tânia		(substituted off) 81'
RM	2	Elaine
CM	8	Formiga
CM	20	Ester		(substituted off) 63'
LM	9	Maycon
AM	7	Daniela	(yellow card) 59'
CF	11	Cristiane
CF	10	Marta
Substitutions:
DF	6	Rosana		(substituted in) 63'
MF	18	Pretinha		(substituted in) 81'
FW	15	Kátia		(substituted in) 88'
Manager:
Jorge Barcellos

Assistant referees:
María Isabel Tovar (Mexico)
Rita Muñoz (Mexico)
Fourth official:
Mayumi Oiwa (Japan)

== See also ==
- Brazil at the FIFA Women's World Cup
- Germany at the FIFA Women's World Cup
