= 2025 Santos FC (women) season =

Santos
2025 season
- President: Marcelo Teixeira
- Head coach: Caio Couto
- Stadium: Vila Belmiro
- Campeonato Brasileiro Série A2: Winners
- Campeonato Paulista: First stage
- Copa do Brasil: Third round
- Copa Paulista: Runners-up
- Top goalscorer: League: Laryh (8); All: Laryh (12)
Home colours	Away colours	Third colours

The 2025 season was Santos FC's 26th season in existence and the club's first season in the second division of Brazilian football. As well as the Campeonato Brasileiro Série A2, the club competed in the Campeonato Paulista and in the Copa do Brasil.

== Players ==
=== Squad information ===
As of 3 December 2025

N	Name	Pos.	Nat.	Place of Birth	Date of Birth (Age)	Caps	Goals	Signed from	Date signed	Contract End
Goalkeepers
1	Stefane	GK	(Brazil)	Rio de Janeiro (Rio de Janeiro (state))	12 May 1999 (aged 26)	19	0	NSU Sharks (United States)	2 July 2024	31 December 2027
12	Karen Hipólito	GK	(Brazil)	São Paulo (São Paulo (state))	25 February 1993 (aged 32)	30	0	Ferroviária	10 January 2024	31 December 2025
23	Giullia Matallo	GK	(Brazil)	—N/a	13 September 2006 (aged 19)	0	0	Youth system	21 November 2025	31 December 2026
24	Michelle	GK	(Brazil)	São Paulo (São Paulo (state))	27 February 2004 (aged 21)	0	0	Youth system	16 May 2022	31 December 2025
31	Agatha	GK	(Brazil)	Duque de Caxias (Rio de Janeiro (state))	10 May 2004 (aged 21)	0	0	Youth system	7 January 2025	31 December 2025
—	Ágatha Basilio	GK	(Brazil)	Santa Maria (Rio Grande do Sul)	20 October 2003 (aged 22)	0	0	Minas Brasília	27 February 2025	31 December 2025
Defenders
2	Larissa Vasconcelos	LB/LW	(Brazil)	Abaetetuba (Pará)	2 July 2001 (aged 24)	58	3	Cruzeiro	25 January 2024	31 December 2027
3	Rafa Martins	CB/LB	(Brazil)	Santa Luzia (Minas Gerais)	17 July 1999 (aged 26)	29	1	Ljuboten (North Macedonia)	31 July 2024	31 December 2026
4	Ana Alice	CB	(Brazil)	Porto Firme (Minas Gerais)	14 March 1989 (aged 36)	28	4	São Paulo	9 January 2025	31 December 2026
6	Raissa Calheiros	CB/RB	(Brazil)	São Paulo (São Paulo (state))	26 June 2004 (aged 21)	8	0	Youth system	6 December 2022	31 December 2025
14	Leandra	LB	(Brazil)	Rio de Janeiro (Rio de Janeiro (state))	13 December 2004 (aged 20)	13	0	Fluminense	11 March 2025	12 December 2027
15	Leidiane	RB	(Brazil)	Gravataí (Rio Grande do Sul)	30 August 1993 (aged 32)	40	0	Atlético Mineiro	26 January 2024	31 December 2025
16	Barbara Cuzzuol	RB	(Brazil)	São Paulo (São Paulo (state))	16 July 2004 (aged 21)	16	0	Youth system	20 December 2024	31 December 2027
21	Ingryd Avancini	CB	(Brazil)	São Paulo (São Paulo (state))	21 December 1998 (aged 26)	3	0	Red Bull Bragantino	9 January 2025	31 December 2026
22	Evellyn Marques	RB	(Brazil)	Rio de Janeiro (Rio de Janeiro (state))	14 May 1998 (aged 27)	25	0	Athletico Paranaense	16 January 2025	31 December 2026
27	Carol Lara	RB/RW	(Brazil)	Conselheiro Lafaiete (Minas Gerais)	13 August 2003 (aged 22)	0	0	Red Bull Bragantino	26 January 2024	31 December 2025
33	Pardal	CB	(Brazil)	São Paulo (São Paulo (state))	8 October 1993 (aged 32)	25	2	Colo-Colo (Chile)	21 January 2025	31 December 2026
36	Lívia Mathias	RB	(Brazil)	Santo André (São Paulo (state))	30 January 2003 (aged 22)	16	0	Corinthians	26 January 2024	31 December 2025
38	Sara	CB	(Brazil)	—N/a	27 November 2007 (aged 18)	1	0	Youth system	21 November 2025	30 September 2028
39	Gabrielle Gadoti	RB	(Brazil)	Salto (São Paulo (state))	14 June 2007 (aged 18)	1	0	Youth system	21 November 2025	31 December 2027
—	Nívea	CB/RB	(Brazil)	Araraquara (São Paulo (state))	3 October 2006 (aged 19)	0	0	Youth system	23 May 2025	31 December 2026
Midfielders
5	Nath Pitbull	DM/CB	(Brazil)	Jundiaí (São Paulo (state))	4 June 1995 (aged 30)	53	6	3B da Amazônia	16 May 2024	31 December 2026
8	Suzane Pires	CM/AM	(Portugal)	São Paulo (São Paulo (state))	17 August 1992 (aged 33)	99	10	Ferroviária	29 January 2024	31 December 2027
17	Analuyza	AM/RW	(Brazil)	Cristalina (Goiás)	14 April 2004 (aged 21)	55	9	Internacional	10 January 2025	31 December 2027
18	Júlia	DM	(Brazil)	Encantado (Rio Grande do Sul)	24 November 2001 (aged 24)	84	9	Internacional	13 April 2021	31 December 2025
20	Nicole Marussi	AM	(Brazil)	Salto (São Paulo (state))	26 January 2004 (aged 21)	32	5	Corinthians	23 January 2025	31 December 2025
28	Mari Feitosa	AM/RW	(Brazil)	São Paulo (São Paulo (state))	25 September 2006 (aged 19)	2	0	Youth system	14 March 2024	31 December 2026
29	Anna Cury	AM/RW	(Brazil)	Ituiutaba (Minas Gerais)	5 February 2006 (aged 19)	3	0	Youth system	2 August 2025	31 December 2026
32	Giulia Giovanna	AM	(Brazil)	Brasília (Federal District (Brazil))	27 March 2004 (aged 21)	6	0	Internacional	10 January 2025	31 December 2026
35	Luiza Maria	DM	(Brazil)	—N/a	13 May 2005 (aged 20)	1	1	Youth system	21 November 2025	12 May 2026
37	Camile Abreu	AM	(Brazil)	Piracicaba (São Paulo (state))	23 March 2007 (aged 18)	14	1	Youth system	19 April 2024	31 December 2027
88	Rafa Andrade	DM/RB	(Brazil)	Sousa (Paraíba)	2 May 1997 (aged 28)	30	5	Cruzeiro	15 January 2025	31 December 2026
Forwards
7	Ketlen	RW/LW	(Brazil)	Rio Fortuna (Santa Catarina (state))	7 January 1992 (aged 33)	363	206	Boston Breakers (United States)	20 January 2021	31 December 2026
9	Carol Baiana	ST/RW	(Brazil)	Petrolina (Pernambuco)	28 October 1994 (aged 31)	53	18	Cruzeiro	26 January 2024	31 December 2025
10	Thaisinha	RW/AM	(Brazil)	São Paulo (São Paulo (state))	20 January 1993 (aged 32)	201	80	HS Red Angels (South Korea)	21 January 2022	31 December 2026
11	Laryh	ST	(Brazil)	Rio de Janeiro (Rio de Janeiro (state))	1 November 1987 (aged 38)	58	21	São Paulo	22 January 2025	31 December 2026
13	Samara	RW/RB	(Brazil)	Rio Verde (Goiás)	4 October 2006 (aged 19)	29	1	Youth system	13 August 2024	31 December 2027
19	Isa Viana	ST/AM	(Brazil)	Barueri (São Paulo (state))	20 April 2005 (aged 20)	1	0	Youth system	25 February 2023	31 December 2026
30	Ana Barboza	RW/LW	(Brazil)	Angra dos Reis (Rio de Janeiro (state))	30 April 2005 (aged 20)	3	0	Youth system	30 January 2025	31 December 2025
34	Evelin Bonifácio	LW/RW	(Brazil)	Peruíbe (São Paulo (state))	8 April 2008 (aged 17)	5	1	Youth system	13 August 2025	31 December 2026

Source: SantosFC.com.br (for appearances and goals), FPF (for contracts).

=== Appearances and goals ===
No.	Pos.	Nat	Name	Brasileirão A2		Paulistão		Copa do Brasil		Copa Paulista		Total	
No.	Pos.	Nat	Name	Apps	Goals	Apps	Goals	Apps	Goals	Apps	Goals	Apps	Goals
1	GK	(Brazil)	Stefane	9	0	5	0	2	0	3	0	19	0
12	GK	(Brazil)	Karen Hipólito	4	0	9	0	0	0	0	0	13	0
23	GK	(Brazil)	Giullia Matallo	0	0	0	0	0	0	0	0	0	0
31	GK	(Brazil)	Agatha	0	0	0	0	0	0	0	0	0	0
—	GK	(Brazil)	Ágatha Basilio	0	0	0	0	0	0	0	0	0	0
2	DF	(Brazil)	Larissa Vasconcelos	8+1	0	13+1	2	1	0	2	0	26	2
3	DF	(Brazil)	Rafa Martins	5+3	0	6+3	0	1+1	0	3	0	22	0
4	DF	(Brazil)	Ana Alice	10+1	1	14	2	2	0	1	1	28	4
6	DF	(Brazil)	Raissa Calheiros	1	0	2+4	0	0	0	0	0	7	0
14	DF	(Brazil)	Leandra	1+3	0	0+8	0	0	0	1	0	13	0
15	DF	(Brazil)	Leidiane	4+2	0	6+1	0	0	0	0+1	0	14	0
16	DF	(Brazil)	Barbara Cuzzuol	8	0	2+4	0	1	0	0+1	0	16	0
21	DF	(Brazil)	Ingryd Avancini	3	0	0	0	0	0	0	0	3	0
22	DF	(Brazil)	Evellyn Marques	1+8	0	7+5	0	1	0	3	0	25	0
33	DF	(Brazil)	Pardal	11	1	10+1	1	2	0	1	0	25	2
36	DF	(Brazil)	Lívia Mathias	0+1	0	0+1	0	0	0	0	0	2	0
38	DF	(Brazil)	Sara	0	0	0	0	0	0	0+1	0	1	0
39	DF	(Brazil)	Gabrielle Gadoti	0	0	0	0	0	0	0+1	0	1	0
—	DF	(Brazil)	Nívea	0	0	0	0	0	0	0	0	0	0
5	MF	(Brazil)	Nath Pitbull	9+3	1	12+2	1	2	1	3	1	31	4
8	MF	(Portugal)	Suzane Pires	13	2	12+1	0	2	0	3	0	31	2
18	MF	(Brazil)	Júlia	2+8	0	4+9	0	0+2	0	3	1	28	1
20	MF	(Brazil)	Nicole Marussi	2+2	0	2+4	3	0+1	0	1+2	0	14	3
29	MF	(Brazil)	Anna Cury	0	0	0+2	0	0	0	0+1	0	3	0
32	MF	(Brazil)	Giulia Giovanna	0+2	0	0+3	0	0+1	0	0	0	6	0
35	MF	(Brazil)	Luiza Maria	0	0	0	0	0	0	0+1	1	1	1
37	MF	(Brazil)	Camile Abreu	1+2	0	0+7	0	0+2	0	0+2	1	14	1
88	MF	(Brazil)	Rafa Andrade	11+1	2	13	2	2	0	3	1	30	5
9	FW	(Brazil)	Carol Baiana	3+8	4	7+5	3	1+1	0	3	4	28	11
10	FW	(Brazil)	Thaisinha	5+2	1	6+1	1	0+1	0	0	0	15	2
11	FW	(Brazil)	Laryh	11+2	8	12+1	2	2	0	3	2	31	12
13	FW	(Brazil)	Samara	10+3	1	6+6	0	2	0	0+1	0	28	1
17	FW	(Brazil)	Analuyza	12+1	3	5+4	0	2	2	0+2	0	26	5
30	FW	(Brazil)	Ana Barboza	0+1	0	0+2	0	0	0	0	0	3	0
34	FW	(Brazil)	Evelin Bonifácio	0	0	1+3	1	0	0	0+1	0	5	1

Last updated: 3 December 2025
Source: Match reports in Competitive matches, Soccerway

=== Goalscorers ===
Ran	No.	Pos	Nat	Name	Brasileirão A2	Paulistão	Copa do Brasil	Copa Paulista	Total
1	11	FW	(Brazil)	Laryh	8	2	0	2	12
2	9	FW	(Brazil)	Carol Baiana	4	3	0	4	11
3	17	FW	(Brazil)	Analuyza	3	0	2	0	5
3	88	MF	(Brazil)	Rafa Andrade	2	2	0	1	5
4	4	DF	(Brazil)	Ana Alice	1	2	0	1	4
4	5	MF	(Brazil)	Nath Pitbull	1	1	1	1	4
5	20	MF	(Brazil)	Nicole Marussi	0	3	0	0	3
6	3	DF	(Brazil)	Larissa Vasconcelos	0	2	0	0	2
6	8	MF	(Portugal)	Suzane Pires	2	0	0	0	2
6	10	FW	(Brazil)	Thaisinha	1	1	0	0	2
6	33	DF	(Brazil)	Pardal	1	1	0	0	2
7	13	FW	(Brazil)	Samara	1	0	0	0	1
7	18	MF	(Brazil)	Júlia Daltoé	0	0	0	1	1
7	34	FW	(Brazil)	Evelin Bonifácio	0	1	0	0	1
7	35	MF	(Brazil)	Luiza Maria	0	0	0	1	1
7	37	MF	(Brazil)	Camile Abreu	0	0	0	1	1
Total					24	18	3	12	55

Last updated: 3 December 2025
Source: Match reports in Competitive matches, Soccerway

=== Disciplinary record ===
N	Nat	Pos	Name	Brasileirão A2			Paulistão			Copa do Brasil			Copa Paulista			Total		
N	Nat	Pos	Name	Yellow card	(yellow card) (yellow-red card)	Red card	Yellow card	(yellow card) (yellow-red card)	Red card	Yellow card	(yellow card) (yellow-red card)	Red card	Yellow card	(yellow card) (yellow-red card)	Red card	Yellow card	(yellow card) (yellow-red card)	Red card
88	(Brazil)	MF	Rafa Andrade	5	1	0	4	0	0	1	0	0	0	0	0	10	1	0
5	(Brazil)	MF	Nath Pitbull	4	0	0	1	0	0	0	0	0	0	0	0	5	0	0
33	(Brazil)	DF	Pardal	1	0	0	1	0	0	0	0	0	1	1	0	3	1	0
3	(Brazil)	DF	Rafa Martins	1	0	0	2	0	0	0	0	0	0	0	0	3	0	0
9	(Brazil)	FW	Carol Baiana	1	0	0	1	0	0	1	0	0	0	0	0	3	0	0
17	(Brazil)	FW	Analuyza	2	0	0	1	0	0	0	0	0	0	0	0	3	0	0
20	(Brazil)	MF	Nicole Marussi	0	0	0	1	0	0	0	0	0	2	0	0	3	0	0
2	(Brazil)	DF	Larissa Vasconcelos	1	0	0	0	0	0	0	0	0	1	0	0	2	0	0
10	(Brazil)	MF	Thaisinha	1	0	0	1	0	0	0	0	0	0	0	0	2	0	0
11	(Brazil)	FW	Laryh	0	0	0	2	0	0	0	0	0	0	0	0	2	0	0
13	(Brazil)	FW	Samara	0	0	0	2	0	0	0	0	0	0	0	0	2	0	0
15	(Brazil)	DF	Leidiane	1	0	0	1	0	0	0	0	0	0	0	0	2	0	0
22	(Brazil)	DF	Evellyn Marques	0	0	0	2	0	0	0	0	0	0	0	0	2	0	0
8	(Portugal)	MF	Suzane Pires	1	0	0	0	0	0	0	0	0	0	0	0	1	0	0
18	(Brazil)	MF	Júlia Daltoé	0	0	0	0	0	0	1	0	0	0	0	0	1	0	0
37	(Brazil)	MF	Camile Abreu	0	0	0	1	0	0	0	0	0	0	0	0	1	0	0
TOTALS				18	1	0	20	0	0	3	0	0	4	1	0	45	2	0

== Coaches ==
Name	Nat.	Place of Birth	Date of Birth (Age)	Signed from	Date signed	Role	G	W	D	L	%	Departure	Manner	Contract End
Caio Couto	(Brazil)	Rio de Janeiro (Rio de Janeiro (state))	29 January 1976 (age 50)	Portuguesa-RJ (men's)	16 September 2024	Permanent	32	17	6	9	53.13			31 December 2025

== Transfers ==
=== Transfers in ===
N.	Pos.	Name	Age	Moving from	Source
21	CB	(Brazil) Ingryd Avancini	26	(Brazil) Red Bull Bragantino	
4	CB	(Brazil) Ana Alice	35	(Brazil) São Paulo	
32	AM	(Brazil) Giulia Giovanna	20	(Brazil) Internacional	
17	AM	(Brazil) Analuyza	20	(Brazil) Internacional	
88	DM	(Brazil) Rafa Andrade	27	(Brazil) Cruzeiro	
22	RB	(Brazil) Evellyn Marques	26	(Brazil) Athletico Paranaense	
33	CB	(Brazil) Pardal	31	(Chile) Colo-Colo	
11	ST	(Brazil) Laryh	37	(Brazil) São Paulo	
20	CM	(Brazil) Nicole Marussi	20	(Brazil) Corinthians (loan)	
23	GK	(Brazil) Ágatha Basilio	21	(Brazil) Minas Brasília	
14	LB	(Brazil) Leandra	20	(Brazil) Fluminense	

=== Transfers out ===
N.	Pos.	Name	Age	Moving to	Source
16	CB	(Brazil) Cida	39	Free agent	
36	LB	(Brazil) Vitória Kaíssa	23	(Brazil) América Mineiro	
14	AM	(Brazil) Ana Carla	30	(Brazil) Red Bull Bragantino	
33	CM	(Brazil) Laura Valverde	21	(Brazil) Red Bull Bragantino	
22	ST	(Argentina) Mili Menéndez	27	(Saudi Arabia) Al-Amal	
11	LW	(Argentina) Yamila Rodríguez	26	(Brazil) Grêmio	
5	LB	(Colombia) Fabiana Yantén	25	(Chile) Colo-Colo	
29	LW	(Brazil) Paola	21	(Brazil) Internacional	
3	LB	(Brazil) Dani Silva	37	(Brazil) 3B da Amazônia	
2	CB	(Brazil) Camila Martins	34	(Chile) Colo-Colo	
24	CB	(Argentina) Aldana Narváez	23	(Argentina) Newell's Old Boys	
37	DM	(Brazil) Karla Alves	25	(Brazil) São Paulo	
—	RB	(Ecuador) Nicole Charcopa	24	(Ecuador) Independiente del Valle	
6	CB	(Brazil) Day Silva	32	(Brazil) São Paulo	
21	CB	(Philippines) Reina Bonta	25	Free agent	
—	CB	(Brazil) Janaína	36	(Brazil) 3B da Amazônia	
1	GK	(Canada) Kelly Chiavaro	28	(Brazil) 3B da Amazônia	
9	ST	(Argentina) Sole Jaimes	36	(Brazil) 3B da Amazônia	
99	ST	(Brazil) Nathane	34	(Brazil) São Paulo	

== Pre-season and friendlies ==
Win Draw Loss Fixtures

21 February 2025 Friendly	Palmeiras	0–1	Santos	Barueri
		Report	Rafa Martins	Stadium: Arena Barueri

28 February 2025 Friendly	Santos	0–2	São Paulo	Santos
		Report	Goal	Stadium: CT Rei Pelé

14 March 2025 Friendly	Santos	1–1	Red Bull Bragantino	Santos
	Marussi	Report	Goal	Stadium: CT Rei Pelé

29 March 2025 Friendly	Taubaté	0–2	Santos	Taubaté
		Report	Suzane Pires; Pardal	Stadium: Joaquinzão

== Competitions ==
=== Campeonato Brasileiro Série A2 ===
==== Results summary ====
Overall								Home						Away					
Pld	W	D	L	GF	GA	GD	Pts	W	D	L	GF	GA	GD	W	D	L	GF	GA	GD
13	10	2	1	24	6	+18	32	5	2	0	12	5	+7	5	0	1	12	1	+11

Source: Soccerway

==== Group stage ====
Pos	Team	Pld	W	D	L	GF	GA	GD	Pts	Qualification or relegation
1	(São Paulo (state)) Santos	7	6	1	0	17	2	+15	19	Advance to the quarter-finals
2	(Rio de Janeiro (state)) Botafogo	7	5	1	1	13	5	+8	16	Advance to the quarter-finals
3	(Minas Gerais) Atlético Mineiro	7	3	2	2	15	4	+11	11	Advance to the quarter-finals
4	(Federal District (Brazil)) Minas Brasília	7	3	2	2	8	10	−2	11	Advance to the quarter-finals
5	(São Paulo (state)) Taubaté	7	3	1	3	8	9	−1	10	

Source: CBF
Rules for classification: 1) points; 2) wins; 3) goal difference; 4) goals scored; 5) head-to-head results (only between 2 teams); 6) fewest red cards; 7) fewest yellow cards; 8) draw.

===== Matches =====
19 April 1	Avaí	0–2	Santos	Caçador
15:00 UTC-03:00	Kaila (yellow card) 87'	Report	(yellow card) 15' Rafa Andrade; 45+2' (pen.) Thaisinha; (yellow card) 81' Nath Pitbull; 90+1' Analuyza	Stadium: Salézio Kindermann; Referee: Jaqueline Blasius

26 April 2	Santos	1–0	Atlético Mineiro	Santos
15:00 UTC-03:00	Rafa Andrade (yellow card) 6'; Carol Baiana 65'; Pardal (yellow card) 90+3'	Report	(yellow card) 6' Rafa Travalão; (yellow card) 45+2' Ju Pacheco; (yellow card) 77' Nayara	Stadium: Vila Belmiro; Referee: Leonardo Delfino de Abreu Lima

3 May 3	Santos	1–1	Minas Brasília	Santos
15:00 UTC-03:00	Nath Pitbull 19'	Report	(yellow card) 40' Stephane; (yellow card) 45+3' Mariana; 64' (pen.) Michele Carioca; (yellow card) 65' Rafa Barros; (yellow card) 67' Ayala	Stadium: Vila Belmiro; Referee: Talita Ximenes de Freitas

17 May 4	Taubaté	0–4	Santos	Taubaté
15:00 UTC-03:00	Luana Marques (yellow card) 26' (yellow-red card) 44'	Report	19', 71' Laryh; 23' Suzane Pires; 61' Analuyza	Stadium: Joaquinzão; Referee: Rodrigo Fernandes Junior

24 May 5	Santos	3–1	Botafogo	Santos
15:00 UTC-03:00	Samara 15'; Nath Pitbull (yellow card) 31'; Laryh 74'; Rafa Andrade 83'	Report	(yellow card) 29' Ana Grazyelle; 86' Júllia Moreira	Stadium: Vila Belmiro; Referee: Ana Caroline D'Eleuterio de Sousa Carvalho

8 June 6	São José	0–4	Santos	São José dos Campos
15:00 UTC-03:00	Maria Cristina (yellow card) 16'; Adrielly (yellow card) 85'	Report	17', 21' Laryh; 84' Pardal; 85' Ana Alice	Stadium: João do Pulo; Referee: Talita Ximenes de Freitas

14 June 7	Santos	2–0	Vasco da Gama	Santos
15:00 UTC-03:00	Rafa Andrade 43'; Carol Baiana 74'	Report	(yellow card) 85' Fernanda Tandeski	Stadium: Vila Belmiro; Referee: Leonardo Delfino de Abreu Lima

==== Quarterfinals ====
Group C

21 June First leg	Ação	0–1	Santos	Várzea Grande
16:00	Gislaine (yellow card) 11' (yellow card) 11' (yellow-red card) 53'	Report	(yellow card) 15' Suzane Pires; 22' (yellow card) 56' Analuyza; (yellow card) 45+2' Nath Pitbull; (yellow card) 59' Rafa Martins	Stadium: Dito Souza; Referee: Eleniel Benedito da Silva

5 July Second leg	Santos	2–1	Ação	Santos
15:00	Laryh 10' (pen.), 78' (pen.)	Report	(yellow card) 45+3' Paty Alves; 51' Rafinha; (yellow card) 90+3' Índia	Stadium: Vila Belmiro; Referee: Daiane Muniz

==== Semifinals ====
Group G

11 August First leg	Atlético Mineiro	1–0	Santos	Belo Horizonte
21:00	Tayane (yellow card) 2'; Luana Índia 13'; Amália (yellow card) 44'	Report	(yellow card) 31' Leidiane; (yellow card) 45+1' Rafa Andrade	Stadium: Arena MRV; Referee: Andreza Helena de Siqueira

18 August Second leg	Santos	2–1 (5–4 p)	Atlético Mineiro	Santos
21:00	Suzane Pires 20'; Laryh 51'; Larissa Vasconcelos (yellow card) 73'; Carol Baiana (yellow card) 90+5'; Rafa Andrade (yellow card) 90+7' (yellow-red card) 90+7'	Report	90+7' Hingredy	Stadium: Vila Belmiro; Referee: Talita Ximenes de Freitas
	Penalties
	Carol Baiana (penalty scored); Júlia (penalty missed); Pardal (penalty scored); Larissa Vasconcelos (penalty missed); Laryh (penalty scored); Leidiane (penalty scored); Nath Pitbull (penalty scored)		(penalty missed) Laura Maria; (penalty missed) Hingredy; (penalty scored) Karen Cristina; (penalty scored) Bárbara Melo; (penalty scored) Kélen Bender; (penalty scored) Ju Pacheco; (penalty missed) Ramos

==== Finals ====
Group I

26 August First leg	Botafogo	0–1	Santos	Rio de Janeiro
21:00	Natane (yellow card) 45+5'; Débora Bebê (yellow card) 46'; Ana Caroline (yellow card) 66'; Sassá (yellow card) 90+2'	Report	(yellow card) 49' Nath Pitbull; 88' Carol Baiana	Stadium: Nilton Santos; Referee: Andreza Helena de Siqueira

30 August Second leg	Santos	1–1	Botafogo	Santos
15:00	Rafa Andrade (yellow card) 13'; Analuyza (yellow card) 66'; Carol Baiana 80'; Thaisinha (yellow card) 90+2'	Report	(yellow card) 32' Rita Bove; 43' Ana Caroline; (yellow card) 87' Duda Basílio	Stadium: Vila Belmiro; Referee: Deborah Cecilia Cruz Correia

=== Copa do Brasil ===
==== Second round ====
11 June Group 30	Santos	3–0	Pérolas Negras	Santos
21:00	Analuyza 3', 43'; Nath Pitbull 59'; Júlia (yellow card) 86'	Report	(yellow card) 36' Rodriguez; (yellow card) 39' Sarah; (yellow card) 83' Ellen Lopez	Stadium: Vila Belmiro; Referee: Cassia França de Souza

==== Third round ====
7 August Group 45	América Mineiro	1–0	Santos	Belo Horizonte
15:00	Soraya (yellow card) 26'; Sassá 52'	Report	(yellow card) 45' Carol Baiana; (yellow card) 84' Rafa Andrade	Stadium: Arena Independência; Referee: Andressa Hartmann

=== Campeonato Paulista ===
==== Results summary ====
Overall								Home						Away					
Pld	W	D	L	GF	GA	GD	Pts	W	D	L	GF	GA	GD	W	D	L	GF	GA	GD
14	4	4	6	18	18	0	16	1	3	3	8	9	−1	3	1	3	10	9	+1

Source: Soccerway

==== First stage ====
Pos	Team	Pld	W	D	L	GF	GA	GD	Pts	Qualification
4	São Paulo (Q)	14	6	3	5	25	17	+8	21	Advanced to the semifinals
5	Red Bull Bragantino (E)	14	6	3	5	22	21	+1	21	Eliminated; qualified to the Copa Paulista
6	Santos (E)	14	4	4	6	18	18	0	16	Eliminated; qualified to the Copa Paulista
7	Taubaté (E)	14	3	0	11	7	40	−33	9	Eliminated; qualified to the Copa Paulista
8	Realidade Jovem (E)	14	0	1	13	2	43	−41	1	Eliminated; qualified to the Copa Paulista

Source: ge
(E) Eliminated; (Q) Qualified for the phase indicated

===== Matches =====
6 May 1	São Paulo	1–2	Santos	São Paulo
21:00	Duda Serrana 50' (yellow card) 70'; Robinha (yellow card) 56'; Milena (yellow card) 90'	Report	32' Carol Baiana; (yellow card) 61' Rafa Martins; (yellow card) 81' Evellyn Marques; 85' Ana Alice; (yellow card) 90+1' Rafa Andrade	Stadium: Canindé; Referee: Marianna Nanni Batalha

14 May 2	Santos	0–3	Corinthians	Santo André
20:00	Analuyza (yellow card) 81'	Report	28', 61' Ariel; (yellow card) 55' Érika; 64' Eudimilla; (yellow card) 90' Rodríguez	Stadium: Bruno José Daniel; Referee: Edina Alves Batista

5 June 3	Ferroviária	1–1	Santos	Rio Claro
17:30	Fátima Dutra (yellow card) 57'; Micaelly 88'; Rafa Soares (yellow card) 90+4'	Report	25' Rafa Andrade	Stadium: Benito Agnelo Castellano; Referee: Ana Caroline D'Eleuterio de Sousa Carvalho

9 July 4	Taubaté	2–0	Santos	Taubaté
19:00	Yolanda 7' (pen.); Jissele (yellow card) 33'; Andresa Ferreira (yellow card) 42'; Carol Franco 77'; Luana Marques (yellow card) 83'; Sthefani Paraná (yellow card) 90+5'	Report	(yellow card) 43' Pardal; (yellow card) 45+3' Laryh; (yellow card) 82' Nath Pitbull	Stadium: Joaquinzão; Referee: Jessica Aparecida Milani

3 August 5	Santos	1–1	Realidade Jovem	Santos
15:00	Thaisinha 53'	Report	90+4' Alessandra	Stadium: Vila Belmiro; Referee: Talita Ximenes de Freitas

14 August 6	Palmeiras	0–1	Santos	Barueri
19:00	Isadora Amaral (yellow card) 3'; Espinales (yellow card) 33'	Report	4' Pardal; (yellow card) 15' Thaisinha; (yellow card) 20' Laryh; (yellow card) 70' Rafa Martins; (yellow card) 89' Camile Abreu	Stadium: Arena Barueri; Referee: Marianna Nanni Batalha

3 September 8	Santos	2–2	São Paulo	Santos
20:00	Leidiane (yellow card) 8'; Rafa Andrade (yellow card) 61'; Ana Alice 89'; Laryh 90+3'	Report	(yellow card) 13' Camilinha; 22' Duda Serrana; (yellow card) 30' Bia Menezes; (yellow card) 36' Anny; (yellow card) 38' Bruna Calderan; 54' Isabelle Guimarães	Stadium: Vila Belmiro; Referee: Daiane Muniz

20 September 9	Corinthians	1–0	Santos	São Paulo
11:00	Andressa Alves (yellow card) 39'; Jaqueline Ribeiro 45+3'; Juliete (yellow card) 84'; Vic Albuquerque (yellow card) 90+1'	Report	(yellow card) 70' Samara	Stadium: Parque São Jorge; Referee: Marianna Nanni Batalha

28 September 10	Santos	1–2	Ferroviária	Jundiaí
11:00	Rafa Andrade 63'; Marussi (yellow card) 90+5'	Report	(yellow card) 57' Micaelly; 60' Natalia Vendito; 74' (yellow card) 90+6' Júlia Beatriz; (yellow card) 90+4' Camila Silva	Stadium: Jayme Cintra; Referee: Talita Ximenes de Freitas

2 October 7	Santos	0–1	Red Bull Bragantino	Santos
17:00		Report	(yellow card) 20' Del Trecco; 43' Pâmela dos Santos; (yellow card) 45+1' Laura Valverde; (yellow card) 62' Ana Carla; (yellow card) 90+4' Stella	Stadium: Vila Belmiro; Referee: Michel de Camargo

31 October 11	Santos	4–0	Taubaté	Diadema
19:00	Nath Pitbull 17'; Larissa Vasconcelos 42'; Rafa Andrade (yellow card) 46'; Laryh 66'; Marussi 78'	Report	(yellow card) 37' Andressa Soares; (yellow card) 69' Nayra Pimentinha; (yellow card) 73' Kakau	Stadium: Arena Inamar; Referee: Adeli Mara Monteiro

10 November 12	Realidade Jovem	1–4	Santos	São José do Rio Preto
18:00	Ingrid 36'; Stella Queiroz (yellow card) 74'; Julia Ferreira (yellow card) 83'	Report	4' Larissa Vasconcelos; 16', 57' Marussi; 25' Carol Baiana	Stadium: João Mendes Athayde; Referee: Ana Caroline D'Eleuterio de Sousa Carvalho

12 November 13	Santos	0–0	Palmeiras	Diadema
15:00	Evellyn Marques (yellow card) 34'	Report	(yellow card) 66' Isadora Amaral; (yellow card) 82' Rhayanna	Stadium: Arena Inamar; Referee: Leonardo Delfino de Abreu Lima

16 November 14	Red Bull Bragantino	3–2	Santos	Santana de Parnaíba
19:30	Ongaro 1', 69'; Ana Carla 16'; Alice (yellow card) 40'; Ilana (yellow card) 46'	Report	22' (pen.) (yellow card) 59' Carol Baiana; 41' (pen.) Evelin Bonifácio; (yellow card) 69' Rafa Andrade; (yellow card) 73' Samara	Stadium: Municipal Prefeito Gabriel Marques da Silva; Referee: Talita Ximenes de Freitas

=== Copa Paulista ===
==== Matches ====
22 November Quarterfinal	Santos	8–1	São José	Diadema
10:00	Carol Baiana 9', 44'; Laryh 13', 31'; Júlia 40'; Nath Pitbull 43'; Luiza Maria 47'; Rafa Andrade 77'	Report	20' Iasmyn; (yellow card) 88' Maria Luiza	Stadium: Arena Inamar; Referee: Michel de Camargo

26 November Semifinal	Santos	2–1	Taubaté	Diadema
15:00	Carol Baiana 20', 55'; Pardal (yellow card) 14' (yellow-red card) 86'; Marussi (yellow card) 90+3'	Report	11' Lodi; (yellow card) 54' Nayra Pimentinha; (yellow card) 83' Edilene França	Stadium: Arena Inamar; Referee: Talita Ximenes de Freitas

30 November Final	Santos	2–3	Red Bull Bragantino	Santos
15:00	Larissa Vasconcelos (yellow card) 44'; Ana Alice 50'; Marussi (yellow card) 82'; Camile Abreu 90+6'	Report	5' Vivian; 19', 36' Pâmela dos Santos; (yellow card) 55' Tamires; (yellow card) 68' Brenda Pinheiro	Stadium: Vila Belmiro; Referee: Edina Alves Batista

== See also ==
- 2025 Santos FC season
