= 2024 Campeonato Brasileiro de Futebol Feminino Série A1 =

Campeonato Brasileiro de Futebol Feminino Série A1
- Season: 2024
- Dates: 15 March – 22 September 2024
- Champions: Corinthians (6th title)
- Relegated: Atlético Mineiro; Avaí; Botafogo; Santos
- Copa Libertadores: Corinthians; São Paulo
- Matches: 134
- Goals: 390 (2.91 per match)
- Top goalscorer: Amanda Gutierres (15 goals)
- Biggest home win: Flamengo/Marinha 7–0 Santos; Group stage, R7, 29 April
- Biggest away win: Three matches 0–4; One match 1–5
- Highest scoring: 9 goals Cruzeiro 7–2 Corinthians; Group stage, R14, 17 August

The 2024 Campeonato Brasileiro Feminino A-1 (officially the Brasileirão Feminino Neoenergia 2024 for sponsorship reasons) was the 12th season of the Campeonato Brasileiro de Futebol Feminino Série A1, the top level of women's football in Brazil, and the 8th edition in a Série A1 since its establishment in 2016. The tournament was organized by the Brazilian Football Confederation (CBF). It started on 15 March and ended on 22 September 2024.

Sixteen teams competed in the league – the top twelve teams from the previous season, as well as four teams promoted from the 2023 Série A2 (América Mineiro, Botafogo, Fluminense and Red Bull Bragantino).

In the finals, defending champions Corinthians won their 6th title and 5th in a row after defeating São Paulo 5–1 on aggregate.

Atlético Mineiro, Avaí, Botafogo and Santos were relegated to the 2025 Série A2.

== Format ==
In the group stage, each team played once against the other fifteen teams. Top eight teams qualified for the final stages. Quarter-finals, semi-finals and finals were played on a home-and-away two-legged basis.

== Teams ==
Location of teams in 2024 Série A1 outside the state of São Paulo (in red).
Location of teams in 2024 Série A1 within the state of São Paulo.

Pos.	Relegated from 2023 Série A1
13	Bahia
14	Athletico Paranaense
15	Real Ariquemes
16	Ceará

Pos.	Promoted from 2023 Série A2
1	Red Bull Bragantino
2	Fluminense
3	Botafogo
4	América Mineiro

=== Number of teams by state ===
Number of teams	State	Team(s)
6	São Paulo	Corinthians, Ferroviária, Palmeiras, Red Bull Bragantino, Santos and São Paulo
3	Minas Gerais	América Mineiro, Atlético Mineiro and Cruzeiro
3	Rio de Janeiro	Botafogo, Flamengo/Marinha and Fluminense
2	Rio Grande do Sul	Grêmio and Internacional
1	Distrito Federal	Real Brasília
1	Santa Catarina	Avaí

== Stadiums and locations ==
Team	Location	Stadium	Capacity
(Minas Gerais) América Mineiro	Belo Horizonte	Arena Gregorão (Contagem)	1,600
(Minas Gerais) Atlético Mineiro	Belo Horizonte	Castor Cifuentes (Nova Lima)	5,160
(Minas Gerais) Atlético Mineiro	Belo Horizonte	Arena Gregorão (Contagem)	1,600
(Santa Catarina (state)) Avaí	Caçador	Salézio Kindermann	6,500
(Rio de Janeiro (state)) Botafogo	Rio de Janeiro	Nilton Santos	44,661
(São Paulo (state)) Corinthians	São Paulo	Parque São Jorge	18,500
(São Paulo (state)) Corinthians	São Paulo	Neo Química Arena	47,605
(Minas Gerais) Cruzeiro	Belo Horizonte	Castor Cifuentes (Nova Lima)	5,160
(São Paulo (state)) Ferroviária	Araraquara	Fonte Luminosa	21,441
(Rio de Janeiro (state)) Flamengo/Marinha	Rio de Janeiro	Luso Brasileiro	4,697
(Rio de Janeiro (state)) Fluminense	Rio de Janeiro	CT Vale das Laranjeiras (Duque de Caxias)	500
(Rio de Janeiro (state)) Fluminense	Rio de Janeiro	Luso Brasileiro	4,697
(Rio Grande do Sul) Grêmio	Porto Alegre	Aírton Ferreira da Silva (Eldorado do Sul)	1,500
(Rio Grande do Sul) Grêmio	Porto Alegre	SESC Protásio Alves	2,800
(Rio Grande do Sul) Internacional	Porto Alegre	SESC Protásio Alves	2,800
(São Paulo (state)) Palmeiras	São Paulo	Jayme Cintra (Jundiaí)	13,905
(Federal District (Brazil)) Real Brasília	Brasília	Ciro Machado do Espírito Santo	1,500
(São Paulo (state)) Red Bull Bragantino	Bragança Paulista	Gabriel Marques da Silva (Santana de Parnaíba)	7,220
(São Paulo (state)) Santos	Santos	Urbano Caldeira	21,732
(São Paulo (state)) São Paulo	São Paulo	Marcelo Portugal Gouvêa (Cotia)	2,000

== Personnel and kits ==
Team	Head coach	Captain	Kit manufacturer	Shirt main sponsor
América Mineiro	(Brazil) Jorge Victor	(Brazil) Maiara	Sparta (club manufactured kit)	EstrelaBet
Atlético Mineiro	(Brazil) Adriano Gutierrez	(Brazil) Thamirys	Adidas	Betano
Avaí	(Brazil) Carine Bosetti	(Brazil) Raquelzinha	Umbro	Genial Investimentos
Botafogo	(Brazil) Léo Goulart	(Brazil) Driely	Reebok	Parimatch
Corinthians	(Brazil) Lucas Piccinato	(Brazil) Tamires	Nike	Esporte da Sorte, KSK Consórcio
Cruzeiro	(Brazil) Jonas Urias	(Brazil) Byanca Brasil	Adidas	Gerdau
Ferroviária	(Brazil) Jéssica de Lima	(Brazil) Katiuscia	Lupo Sport	Galera.bet, Estrella Galicia, REAG Investimentos
Flamengo/Marinha	(Brazil) Maurício Salgado	(Brazil) Djeni	Adidas	PixBet
Fluminense	(Brazil) Hoffmann Túlio	(Brazil) Gislaine	Umbro	Superbet
Grêmio	(Brazil) Thaissan Passos	(Brazil) Tayla	Umbro	Banrisul
Internacional	(Brazil) Jorge Barcellos	(Brazil) Bruna Benites	Adidas	EstrelaBet
Palmeiras	(Brazil) Camilla Orlando	(Brazil) Poliana	Puma	Esporte da Sorte
Real Brasília	(Brazil) Dedê Ramos	(Brazil) Dida	Tolledo Sports	Banco BRB
Red Bull Bragantino	(Brazil) Humberto Simão	(Brazil) Stella	Red Bull Bragantino (club manufactured kit)	Red Bull
Santos	(Brazil) Gláucio Carvalho	(Brazil) Thaisinha	Umbro	Blaze.com
São Paulo	(Brazil) Thiago Viana	(Brazil) Aline Milene	New Balance	Superbet

=== Managerial changes ===
Team	Outgoing manager	Manner of departure	Date of vacancy	Position in table	Replaced by	Date of appointment
Internacional	(Brazil) Brenno Basso	Sacked	25 March 2024	13th	(Brazil) Jorge Barcellos ^{1}	29 March 2024
Botafogo	(Brazil) Jorge Barcellos	Signed by Internacional	29 March 2024	9th	(Brazil) Léo Goulart	30 March 2024
Santos	(Brazil) Bruno Silva	Sacked	1 April 2024	12th	(Brazil) Kleiton Lima	9 April 2024
Santos	(Brazil) Kleiton Lima	Resigned	15 April 2024	13th	(Brazil) Gláucio Carvalho ^{2}	21 April 2024
Atlético Mineiro	(Brazil) Antony Menezes	Sacked	22 April 2024	16th	(Brazil) Bruno Proton	23 April 2024
Atlético Mineiro	(Brazil) Bruno Proton	End of caretaker spell	16 June 2024	16th	(Brazil) Adriano Gutierrez	5 July 2024

Interim managers

1. (Brazil) David da Silva was interim manager in the 4th round.
2. (Brazil) Wesly Otoni was interim manager in the 6th round.

== Group stage ==
In the group stage, each team played on a single round-robin tournament. The top eight teams advanced to the quarter-finals of the knockout stages. The teams were ranked according to points (3 points for a win, 1 point for a draw, and 0 points for a loss). If tied on points, the following criteria would be used to determine the ranking: 1. Wins; 2. Goal difference; 3. Goals scored; 4. Fewest red cards; 5. Fewest yellow cards; 6. Draw in the headquarters of the Brazilian Football Confederation (Regulations Article 15).

=== Group A ===
Pos	Team	Pld	W	D	L	GF	GA	GD	Pts	Qualification or relegation
1	Corinthians	15	13	1	1	40	17	+23	40	Advance to Quarter-finals
2	Ferroviária	15	9	5	1	20	9	+11	32	Advance to Quarter-finals
3	São Paulo	15	9	3	3	35	15	+20	30	Advance to Quarter-finals
4	Palmeiras	15	9	1	5	35	17	+18	28	Advance to Quarter-finals
5	Cruzeiro	15	7	3	5	30	17	+13	24	Advance to Quarter-finals
6	Grêmio	15	7	2	6	22	19	+3	23	Advance to Quarter-finals
7	Internacional	15	6	5	4	24	18	+6	23	Advance to Quarter-finals
8	Red Bull Bragantino	15	6	5	4	21	19	+2	23	Advance to Quarter-finals
9	Flamengo/Marinha	15	6	4	5	30	22	+8	22	
10	América Mineiro	15	5	5	5	24	20	+4	20	
11	Fluminense	15	5	4	6	14	19	−5	19	
12	Real Brasília	15	4	5	6	11	16	−5	17	
13	Botafogo (R)	15	2	6	7	13	24	−11	12	Relegation to Campeonato Brasileiro Série A2
14	Santos (R)	15	3	2	10	15	40	−25	11	Relegation to Campeonato Brasileiro Série A2
15	Avaí (R)	15	1	4	10	11	35	−24	7	Relegation to Campeonato Brasileiro Série A2
16	Atlético Mineiro (R)	15	0	1	14	11	49	−38	1	Relegation to Campeonato Brasileiro Série A2

Source: CBF
(R) Relegated

=== Results ===
Home \ Away	AME	ATL	AVA	BOT	COR	CRU	FER	FLA	FLU	GRE	INT	PAL	RBR	RBB	SAN	SPO
América Mineiro		6–0						1–2			1–1		2–0	1–1	2–1	1–1
Atlético Mineiro			1–2		1–3	0–4		2–3		1–2		0–4			1–3	
Avaí	1–3					1–1	0–0	1–1			0–1			3–3	1–3	
Botafogo	2–2	1–1	3–1		0–2					0–2	0–3		0–0			
Corinthians	4–1		3–1				0–0		5–0		3–0		1–0	4–2		3–2
Cruzeiro	1–3			3–0	7–2				2–0		3–1	1–2	1–1			1–1
Ferroviária	2–0	3–2		1–1		1–0			2–1	2–1		2–1			2–0	
Flamengo/Marinha				3–2	2–3	1–2	1–0		3–1	1–1				2–2	7–0	
Fluminense	1–0	3–0	1–0	0–0								2–0		0–0		0–2
Grêmio	1–1		6–0		0–3	1–0			3–2			1–2	2–0			
Internacional		4–0					1–1	1–1	1–1	0–2				1–0	6–2	1–2
Palmeiras	2–0		4–0	0–2	0–1			3–2			1–2		3–1		6–0	
Real Brasília		3–1	1–0				0–2	1–0	1–1		1–1					1–0
Red Bull Bragantino		2–1		2–1		2–1	0–1			1–0		2–2	1–0			
Santos				1–1	1–3	1–3			0–1	2–0			1–1	0–2		0–4
São Paulo		6–0	4–0	3–0			1–1	2–1		4–0		1–5		2–1		

Source: CBF
Legend: Blue = home team win; Yellow = draw; Red = away team win.

== Final stages ==
Starting from the quarter-finals, the teams played a single-elimination tournament with the following rules:

- Quarter-finals, semi-finals and finals were played on a home-and-away two-legged basis, with the higher-seeded team hosting the second leg.
  - If tied on aggregate, the penalty shoot-out would be used to determine the winners (Regulations Article 16).
- Extra time would not be played and away goals rule would not be used in final stages.

Starting from the semi-finals, the teams were seeded according to their performance in the tournament. The teams were ranked according to overall points. If tied on overall points, the following criteria would be used to determine the ranking: 1. Overall wins; 2. Overall goal difference; 3. Overall goals scored; 4. Overall fewest red cards; 5. Overall fewest yellow cards; 6. Draw in the headquarters of the Brazilian Football Confederation (Regulations Article 21).

=== Bracket ===
Quarter-finals
(Rio Grande do Sul) Grêmio	1	0	1
(São Paulo (state)) São Paulo	2	0	2
(Rio Grande do Sul) Internacional	1	0	1
(São Paulo (state)) Ferroviária	1	2	3
(Minas Gerais) Cruzeiro	1	2	3
(São Paulo (state)) Palmeiras	2	2	4
(São Paulo (state)) Red Bull Bragantino	1	0	1
(São Paulo (state)) Corinthians	1	1	2

Semi-finals
(São Paulo (state)) São Paulo (p)	2	0	2 (3)
(São Paulo (state)) Ferroviária	1	1	2 (0)
(São Paulo (state)) Palmeiras	1	2	3
(São Paulo (state)) Corinthians	3	1	4

Finals
(São Paulo (state)) São Paulo	1	0	1
(São Paulo (state)) Corinthians	3	2	5

=== Quarter-finals ===
Team 1	Agg.	Team 2	1st leg	2nd leg
Red Bull Bragantino (São Paulo (state))	1–2	(São Paulo (state)) Corinthians	1–1	0–1
Internacional (Rio Grande do Sul)	1–3	(São Paulo (state)) Ferroviária	1–1	0–2
Grêmio (Rio Grande do Sul)	1–2	(São Paulo (state)) São Paulo	1–2	0–0
Cruzeiro (Minas Gerais)	3–4	(São Paulo (state)) Palmeiras	1–2	2–2

==== Group B ====
24 August 2024
18:00

Red Bull Bragantino (São Paulo (state))	1–1	(São Paulo (state)) Corinthians
Jane Tavares 3'		Jaqueline 33'

Estádio Nabi Abi Chedid, Bragança Paulista
Referee: Marianna Nanni Batalha (São Paulo)

27 August 2024
19:00

Corinthians (São Paulo (state))	1–0	(São Paulo (state)) Red Bull Bragantino
Victória 32'

Estádio do Canindé, São Paulo
Referee: Daiane Caroline Muniz dos Santos (São Paulo)

Corinthians won 2–1 on aggregate and advanced to the semi-finals.

==== Group C ====
25 August 2024
10:45

Internacional (Rio Grande do Sul)	1–1	(São Paulo (state)) Ferroviária
Priscila 84' (pen.)		Duda Santos 63' (pen.)

Estádio Centenário, Caxias do Sul
Referee: Rejane Caetano da Silva (Rio de Janeiro)

28 August 2024
15:30

Ferroviária (São Paulo (state))	2–0	(Rio Grande do Sul) Internacional
Neném 11'; Mylena Carioca 58'

Fonte Luminosa, Araraquara
Referee: Andreza Helena de Siqueira (Minas Gerais)

Ferroviária won 3–1 on aggregate and advanced to the semi-finals.

==== Group D ====
26 August 2024
17:00

Grêmio (Rio Grande do Sul)	1–2	(São Paulo (state)) São Paulo
Cássia 18' (pen.)		Aline Milene 45+2', 77'

Estádio Centenário, Caxias do Sul
Referee: Tainan Bordignon Somensi (Santa Catarina)

29 August 2024
14:45

São Paulo (São Paulo (state))	0–0	(Rio Grande do Sul) Grêmio

Estádio do Canindé, São Paulo
Referee: Charly Wendy Straub Deretti (Santa Catarina)

São Paulo won 2–1 on aggregate and advanced to the semi-finals.

==== Group E ====
25 August 2024
10:45

Cruzeiro (Minas Gerais)	1–2	(São Paulo (state)) Palmeiras
Vitória Calhau 90' (pen.)		Juliete 5'; Amanda Gutierres 61'

Arena Independência, Belo Horizonte
Referee: Maria Luiza Brandellero dos Santos (Paraná)

28 August 2024
15:30

Palmeiras (São Paulo (state))	2–2	(Minas Gerais) Cruzeiro
Laís Estevam 1'; Bruna Calderan 10'		Luana Índia 35'; Giovanna Oliveira 86'

Estádio Jayme Cintra, Jundiaí
Referee: Deborah Cecilia Cruz Correia (Pernambuco)

Palmeiras won 4–3 on aggregate and advanced to the semi-finals.

=== Semi-finals ===
Pos	Team	Pld	W	D	L	GF	GA	GD	Pts	Host
1	(São Paulo (state)) Corinthians	17	14	2	1	42	18	+24	44	Second leg
4	(São Paulo (state)) Palmeiras	17	10	2	5	39	20	+19	32	First leg
2	(São Paulo (state)) Ferroviária	17	10	6	1	23	10	+13	36	Second leg
3	(São Paulo (state)) São Paulo	17	10	4	3	37	16	+21	34	First leg

Source: CBF

Team 1	Agg.	Team 2	1st leg	2nd leg
Palmeiras (São Paulo (state))	3–4	(São Paulo (state)) Corinthians	1–3	2–1
São Paulo (São Paulo (state))	2–2 (3–0 p)	(São Paulo (state)) Ferroviária	2–1	0–1

==== Group F ====
1 September 2024
10:45

Palmeiras (São Paulo (state))	1–3	(São Paulo (state)) Corinthians
Amanda Gutierres 36' (pen.)		Victória 83'; Carol Nogueira 90+1'; Duda Sampaio 90+4'

Estádio Jayme Cintra, Jundiaí
Referee: Andreza Helena de Siqueira (Minas Gerais)

8 September 2024
16:00

Corinthians (São Paulo (state))	1–2	(São Paulo (state)) Palmeiras
Duda Sampaio 24'		Laís Estevam 8'; Letícia Moreno 87'

Estádio do Canindé, São Paulo
Referee: Rejane Caetano da Silva (Rio de Janeiro)

Corinthians won 4–3 on aggregate and advanced to the finals.

==== Group G ====
2 September 2024
21:30

São Paulo (São Paulo (state))	2–1	(São Paulo (state)) Ferroviária
Dudinha 21'; Ariel Godoi 74'		Micaelly 63'

Estádio do Canindé, São Paulo
Referee: Rejane Caetano da Silva (Rio de Janeiro)

8 September 2024
16:00

Ferroviária (São Paulo (state))	1–0	(São Paulo (state)) São Paulo
Duda Santos 90+1' (pen.)
Penalties
Luana Sartório (penalty missed); Rafa Soares (penalty missed); Fátima Dutra (penalty missed)	0–3	(penalty scored) Jéssica Soares; (penalty scored) Kaká; (penalty scored) Maressa

Fonte Luminosa, Araraquara
Referee: Deborah Cecilia Cruz Correia (Pernambuco)

Tied 2–2 on aggregate, São Paulo won on penalties and advanced to the finals.

=== Finals ===
Pos	Team	Pld	W	D	L	GF	GA	GD	Pts	Host
1	(São Paulo (state)) Corinthians	19	15	2	2	46	21	+25	47	2nd leg
2	(São Paulo (state)) São Paulo	19	11	4	4	39	18	+21	37	1st leg

Source: CBF

Team 1	Agg.	Team 2	1st leg	2nd leg
São Paulo (São Paulo (state))	1–5	(São Paulo (state)) Corinthians	1–3	0–2

==== Group H ====
15 September 2024
10:00

São Paulo (São Paulo (state))	1–3	(São Paulo (state)) Corinthians
Ariel Godoi 90+4'		Millene 22'; Victória 48', 88'

MorumBIS, São Paulo
Attendance: 28,420
Referee: Charly Wendy Straub Deretti (Santa Catarina)

22 September 2024
10:00

Corinthians (São Paulo (state))	2–0	(São Paulo (state)) São Paulo
Jaqueline 64'; Carol Nogueira 90'

Neo Química Arena, São Paulo
Attendance: 44,529
Referee: Daiane Caroline Muniz dos Santos (São Paulo)

== Top goalscorers ==
Rank	Player	Club	Goals
1	(Brazil) Amanda Gutierres	Palmeiras	15
2	(Brazil) Victória	Corinthians	13
3	(Brazil) Cristiane	Flamengo/Marinha	11
4	(Brazil) Ariel Godoi	São Paulo	7
4	(Brazil) Cássia	Grêmio	7
4	(Brazil) Duda Santos	Ferroviária	7
4	(Brazil) Jheniffer	Corinthians	7
4	(Brazil) Priscila	Internacional	7

Source:CBF

== See also ==
- 2024 Supercopa do Brasil de Futebol Feminino
