= Laryh =

Brazilian footballer

Personal information
- Full name: Larissa Pereira da Cruz
- Date of birth: 1 November 1987 (age 39)
- Place of birth: Rio de Janeiro, Brazil
- Height: 1.68 m (5 ft 6 in)
- Position: Forward

Team information
- Current team: Santos

Senior career*
| Years | Team | Apps | (Gls) |
| 2008–2009 | Campo Grande | | |
| 2010 | CEPE-Caxias | 4 | (0) |
| 2011–2012 | Vasco da Gama | | |
| 2013 | Duque de Caxias | 0 | (0) |
| 2013–2014 | Vasco da Gama | 12 | (8) |
| 2014–2015 | Botafogo | 19 | (12) |
| 2015–2019 | Flamengo | 87 | (43) |
| 2020 | Santos | 22 | (9) |
| 2021 | Kindermann/Avaí | 17 | (7) |
| 2021–2023 | Ferroviária | 65 | (27) |
| 2024 | São Paulo | 30 | (3) |
| 2025– | Santos | 26 | (10) |

International career
| 2015 | Brazil (University) | | (2) |
- * Club domestic league appearances and goals as of 19:01, 29 December 2025 (UTC)

Larissa Pereira da Cruz (born 1 November 1987), commonly known as Laryh, is a Brazilian professional footballer who plays as a forward for Santos.

== Club career ==
Born in Rio de Janeiro, Laryh began her career with local side Campo Grande in 2008, scoring 21 goals in the Campeonato Carioca. She moved to CEPE-Caxias in 2010, winning the 2010 Copa do Brasil de Futebol Feminino with the club.

Laryh signed for Vasco da Gama ahead of the 2011 season, but failed to feature regularly. In 2013, after playing for Duque de Caxias, she returned to Vasco and started featuring more regularly.

In 2015, after a one-year spell at Botafogo, Laryh agreed to a deal with Flamengo. She became a regular starter for the club, helping them to win the 2016 Campeonato Brasileiro de Futebol Feminino Série A1 and being their top scorer in the competition.

On 28 January 2020, Laryh was announced at Santos. Despite being a regular starter for the Sereias, she moved to Kindermann/Avaí in 2021, before signing for Ferroviária on 14 September of that year.

On 2 January 2024, Laryh was announced at São Paulo. On 22 January of the following year, she returned to Santos on a one-year contract.

== International career ==
Laryh was initially called up to the 2011 Pan American Games, but was one of the four players cut from the final squad. In 2015, she was a member of the Brazil University team in the 2015 Summer Universiade.

== Career statistics ==
As of 29 December 2025

Appearances and goals by club, season and competition
| Club | Season | League | | | State league | | Cup | | Continental | | Other | | Total | |
| Club | Season | Division | Apps | Goals | Apps | Goals | Apps | Goals | Apps | Goals | Apps | Goals | Apps | Goals |
|---|---|---|---|---|---|---|---|---|---|---|---|---|---|---|
| CEPE-Caxias | 2010 | Carioca | — | | 4 | 0 | — | | — | | — | | 4 | 0 |
| Vasco da Gama | 2013 | Série A1 | 4 | 1 | 8 | 7 | — | | — | | — | | 12 | 8 |
| Vasco da Gama | 2014 | Série A1 | — | | — | | 1 | 1 | — | | — | | 1 | 1 |
| Vasco da Gama | Total | | 4 | 1 | 8 | 7 | 1 | 1 | — | | — | | 13 | 9 |
| Botafogo | 2014 | Série A1 | 12 | 9 | 7 | 3 | — | | — | | — | | 19 | 12 |
| Flamengo | 2015 | Série A1 | 5 | 1 | 8 | 4 | — | | — | | — | | 13 | 5 |
| Flamengo | 2016 | Série A1 | 9 | 8 | 2 | 0 | 4 | 3 | — | | — | | 15 | 11 |
| Flamengo | 2017 | Série A1 | 14 | 4 | 6 | 2 | — | | — | | — | | 20 | 6 |
| Flamengo | 2018 | Série A1 | 15 | 2 | 8 | 8 | — | | — | | — | | 23 | 10 |
| Flamengo | 2019 | Série A1 | 17 | 11 | 3 | 3 | — | | — | | — | | 20 | 14 |
| Flamengo | Total | | 60 | 26 | 27 | 17 | 4 | 3 | — | | — | | 91 | 46 |
| Santos | 2020 | Série A1 | 16 | 7 | 6 | 2 | — | | — | | 4 (Note: Appearance(s) in Copa Paulista de Futebol Feminino) | 0 | 26 | 9 |
| Kindermann/Avaí | 2021 | Série A1 | 17 | 7 | — | | — | | 3 (Note: Appearance(s) in Copa Libertadores Femenina) | 2 | — | | 20 | 9 |
| Ferroviária | 2021 | Série A1 | — | | 8 | 2 | — | | 6 | 1 | — | | 14 | 3 |
| Ferroviária | 2022 | Série A1 | 17 | 6 | 13 | 10 | — | | 4 | 2 | — | | 34 | 18 |
| Ferroviária | 2023 | Série A1 | 18 | 8 | 9 | 1 | — | | — | | 4 | 0 | 31 | 9 |
| Ferroviária | Total | | 35 | 14 | 30 | 13 | — | | 10 | 3 | 4 | 0 | 89 | 30 |
| São Paulo | 2024 | Série A1 | 19 | 2 | 11 | 1 | — | | — | | — | | 30 | 3 |
| Santos | 2025 | Série A2 | 13 | 8 | 13 | 2 | 2 | 0 | — | | 3 | 2 | 31 | 12 |
| Career total | | | 176 | 73 | 112 | 54 | 7 | 4 | 10 | 3 | 11 | 2 | 294 | 136 |

== Honours ==
Campo Grande

- Campeonato Carioca de Futebol Feminino: 2008

CEPE-Caxias

- Copa do Brasil de Futebol Feminino: 2010

Vasco da Gama

- Campeonato Carioca de Futebol Feminino: 2013

Botafogo

- Campeonato Carioca de Futebol Feminino: 2014

Flamengo

- Campeonato Brasileiro de Futebol Feminino Série A1: 2016
- Campeonato Carioca de Futebol Feminino: 2015, 2016, 2017, 2018, 2019

Santos

- Copa Paulista de Futebol Feminino: 2020
- Campeonato Brasileiro de Futebol Feminino Série A2: 2025

Ferroviária

- Copa Paulista de Futebol Feminino: 2023
