= Stefane =

Brazilian footballer (born 1992)

Personal information
- Full name: Stefane Pereira Rosa
- Date of birth: 12 May 1999 (age 27)
- Place of birth: Rio de Janeiro, Brazil
- Height: 5 ft 9 in (1.75 m)
- Position: Goalkeeper

Team information
- Current team: Santos
- Number: 1

Youth career
- 2016: Team Chicago Brasil

College career
Years	Team	Apps	(Gls)
2019–2021	Monroe Mustangs	27	(0)
2022–2023	Nova Southeastern Sharks	28	(0)

Senior career*
Years	Team	Apps	(Gls)
2017	Vitória das Tabocas	3	(0)
2018	Flamengo	1	(0)
2019	Internacional	2	(0)
2020	Iranduba	6	(0)
2020	3B da Amazônia	9	(0)
2021	Real Brasília	2	(0)
2022	AFC Ann Arbor	8	(0)
2024–	Santos	14	(0)
- * Club domestic league appearances and goals as of 16:45, 3 December 2025 (UTC)

Stefane Pereira Rosa (born 12 May 1999), simply known as Stefane, is a Brazilian footballer who plays as a goalkeeper for Santos.

== Club career ==
Born in Rio de Janeiro, Stefane played for local side Team Chicago Brasil as a youth before making her senior debut with Vitória das Tabocas in 2017. On 20 March 2018, she and her sister moved to Flamengo.

Stefane joined Internacional ahead of the 2019 season, but moved to the United States and joined Monroe College's Monroe Mustangs. In 2020, amidst the COVID-19 pandemic, she returned to Brazil and played for Iranduba, 3B da Amazônia and Real Brasília before returning to the Mustangs in 2021.

After an impressive 2021 season, Stefane was included in the NSCAA Women's Division I All-American First Team of the season. She then joined Nova Southeastern University's Nova Southeastern Sharks for the 2022 campaign, and also played eight USL W League matches for AFC Ann Arbor, having joined the side on 7 March 2022.

On 2 July 2024, Stefane returned to her home country and signed a contract with Santos until December 2025.

== International career ==
Stefane was called up to the Brazil national under-17 team for the 2016 FIFA U-17 Women's World Cup, but was a backup option. She was also second-choice with the under-20s in the 2016 FIFA U-20 Women's World Cup, before receiving a call-up to the full side in August 2017, as coach Emily Lima only called up players from the Northeast Region for a period of trainings.

== Personal life ==
Andressa's twin sister Andressa is also a footballer who plays as a centre-back. Both played together at Vitória and Flamengo.

== Career statistics ==
As of 3 December 2025

Appearances and goals by club, season and competition
Club	Season	League			State league		Cup		Continental		Other		Total	
Club	Season	Division	Apps	Goals	Apps	Goals	Apps	Goals	Apps	Goals	Apps	Goals	Apps	Goals
Vitória das Tabocas	2017	Série A1	3	0	?	?	—		—		—		3	0
Flamengo	2018	Série A1	1	0	0	0	—		—		—		1	0
Internacional	2019	Série A1	2	0	—		—		—		—		2	0
Iranduba	2020	Série A1	6	0	—		—		—		—		6	0
3B da Amazônia	2020	Série A2	6	0	3	0	—		—		—		9	0
Real Brasília	2021	Série A1	2	0	—		—		—		—		2	0
Santos	2024	Série A1	0	0	0	0	—		—		—		0	0
Santos	2025	Série A2	9	0	5	0	3	0	—		2 (Note: Appearance(s) in Copa Paulista de Futebol Feminino)	0	19	0
Santos	Total		9	0	5	0	3	0	—		2	0	19	0
Career total			29	0	8	0	3	0	0	0	2	0	42	0

== Honours ==
Flamengo

- Campeonato Carioca de Futebol Feminino: 2018

Santos

- Copa Paulista de Futebol Feminino: 2024
- Campeonato Brasileiro de Futebol Feminino Série A2: 2025

Brazil U20

- South American U-20 Women's Championship: 2018
