= Larissa Vasconcelos =

Brazilian footballer (born 2001)

Personal information
- Full name: Larissa Vasconcelos da Silva
- Date of birth: 2 July 2001 (age 25)
- Place of birth: Abaetetuba, Brazil
- Height: 1.70 m (5 ft 7 in)
- Positions: Left-back; midfielder

Team information
- Current team: Santos
- Number: 17

Youth career
- Santa Madre (futsal)

Senior career*
Years	Team	Apps	(Gls)
2017	Pinheirense		
2018	ESMAC		
2019	Avaí/Kindermann	0	(0)
2019–2021	Napoli-SC	26	(2)
2021–2022	São José	34	(4)
2023	Cruzeiro	20	(2)
2024–	Santos	47	(2)
- * Club domestic league appearances and goals as of 17:20, 3 December 2025 (UTC)

Larissa Vasconcelos da Silva (born 2 July 2001), known as Larissa Vasconcelos or just Larissa, is a Brazilian footballer who plays as either a left-back or a midfielder for Santos FC.

== Career ==
Born in Abaetetuba, Pará, Larissa began her career with a local futsal side named Santa Madre before switching to football with Pinheirense in 2017. She subsequently played for ESMAC also in her native state, winning the 2018 Campeonato Paraense de Futebol Feminino.

In 2019, Larissa moved to Avaí/Kindermann; after featuring with the under-18 side, she moved to affiliate side Napoli-SC, helping them to win the Campeonato Brasileiro de Futebol Feminino Série A2 in the following year. On 7 August 2021, she was announced at São José.

On 17 January 2023, Larissa joined Cruzeiro. Exactly one year later, she signed a two-year contract with Santos. During the 2024 season, she was converted into a left-back at the Sereias da Vila.

== Career statistics ==
As of 3 December 2025

Appearances and goals by club, season and competition
Club	Season	League			State league		Cup		Continental		Other		Total	
Club	Season	Division	Apps	Goals	Apps	Goals	Apps	Goals	Apps	Goals	Apps	Goals	Apps	Goals
Avaí/Kindermann	2019	Série A1	0	0	—		—		—		—		0	0
Napoli-SC	2019	Catarinense	—		6	1	—		—		—		6	1
Napoli-SC	2020	Série A2	8	1	—		—		—		—		8	1
Napoli-SC	2021	Série A1	12	0	—		—		—		—		12	0
Napoli-SC	Total		20	1	6	1	—		—		—		26	2
São José	2021	Série A1	—		10	1	—		—		4 (Note: Appearance(s) in Copa Paulista de Futebol Feminino)	1	14	2
São José	2022	Série A1	15	2	9	1	—		—		—		24	3
São José	Total		15	2	19	2	—		—		4	1	38	5
Cruzeiro	2023	Série A1	13	1	7	1	—		—		—		20	2
Santos	2024	Série A1	15	0	9	0	—		4 (Note: Appearance(s) in Copa Libertadores Femenina)	0	4	1	32	1
Santos	2025	Série A2	9	0	14	2	1	0	—		2	0	26	2
Santos	Total		24	0	23	2	1	0	4	0	6	1	58	3
Career total			72	4	55	6	1	0	4	0	10	2	142	12

== Honours ==
ESMAC

- Campeonato Paraense de Futebol Feminino: 2018

Napoli-SC

- Campeonato Brasileiro de Futebol Feminino Série A2: 2020

Cruzeiro

- Campeonato Mineiro de Futebol Feminino: 2023

Santos

- Copa Paulista de Futebol Feminino: 2024
- Campeonato Brasileiro de Futebol Feminino Série A2: 2025
