= Rafa Andrade =

Brazilian footballer

Personal information
- Full name: Rafaela Andrade da Silva
- Date of birth: 2 May 1997 (age 29)
- Place of birth: Sousa, Brazil
- Height: 1.54 m (5 ft 1 in)
- Position: Midfielder

Team information
- Current team: Santos
- Number: 88

Senior career*
Years	Team	Apps	(Gls)
2014–2015	São Bernardo	20	(1)
2016	Portuguesa	2	(0)
2016	Foz Cataratas	0	(0)
2017–2018	Kindermann	36	(4)
2018	→ Napoli (loan)	1	(1)
2018	3B da Amazônia	3	(0)
2018	Tiradentes-CE	3	(1)
2018	Botafogo-PB	1	(1)
2019–2020	Ferroviária	53	(7)
2021	Palmeiras	17	(0)
2022–2024	Cruzeiro	38	(4)
2025–	Santos	25	(4)

International career
2015	Brazil U20		
- * Club domestic league appearances and goals as of 20:51, 29 December 2025 (UTC)

Rafaela Andrade da Silva (born 2 May 1997), known as Rafa Andrade, is a Brazilian professional footballer who plays as a midfielder for Santos.

== Club career ==
Born in Sousa, Paraíba, Rafa Andrade moved to São Paulo at the age of eight, and began her career with São Bernardo in 2014. She later represented Portuguesa, Foz Cataratas, Kindermann, Napoli, 3B da Amazônia and Botafogo-PB before joining Ferroviária in 2019.

Rafa Andrade was a part of the squad of AFE which won the 2019 Campeonato Brasileiro Série A1, but left the club on 28 December 2020. On 3 January 2021, she was announced at Palmeiras.

On 14 January 2022, Rafa Andrade was announced at Cruzeiro. On 5 January 2024, after being regularly used, she renewed her contract with the club for a further year.

On 12 December 2024, Rafa Andrade left the Cabulosas, and agreed to a one-year deal with Santos the following 15 January.

== Career statistics ==
As of 24 December 2025

Appearances and goals by club, season and competition
Club	Season	League			State league		Cup		Continental		Other		Total	
Club	Season	Division	Apps	Goals	Apps	Goals	Apps	Goals	Apps	Goals	Apps	Goals	Apps	Goals
São Bernardo	2014	Paulista	—		8	0	—		—		—		8	0
São Bernardo	2015	Paulista	—		12	1	—		—		—		12	1
São Bernardo	Total		—		20	1	—		—		—		20	1
Portuguesa	2016	Série A1	2	0	—		—		—		—		2	0
Foz Cataratas	2016	Série A1	—		—		8	0	0	0	—		8	0
Kindermann	2017	Série A1	14	0	7	2	—		—		—		21	2
Kindermann	2018	Série A1	15	2	—		—		—		—		15	2
Kindermann	Total		29	2	7	2	—		—		—		36	4
Napoli (loan)	2018	Série A2	1	1	—		—		—		—		1	1
3B da Amazônia	2018	Série A2	—		3	0	—		—		—		3	0
Tiradentes-CE	2018	Cearense	—		3	1	—		—		—		3	1
Botafogo-PB	2018	Série A2	—		1	1	—		—		—		1	1
Ferroviária	2019	Série A1	20	1	13	0	—		6 (Note: Appearance(s) in Copa Libertadores Femenina)	0	—		39	1
Ferroviária	2020	Série A1	16	5	4	0	—		—		—		20	5
Ferroviária	Total		36	6	17	0	—		6	0	—		59	6
Palmeiras	2021	Série A1	17	0	11	3	—		—		4 (Note: Appearance(s) in Copa Paulista de Futebol Feminino)	1	32	4
Cruzeiro	2022	Série A1	8	1	6	0	—		—		1 (Note: Appearance(s) in Supercopa do Brasil de Futebol Feminino)	0	15	1
Cruzeiro	2023	Série A1	14	1	7	2	—		—		—		21	3
Cruzeiro	2024	Série A1	16	2	9	3	—		—		3	0	28	5
Cruzeiro	Total		38	4	22	5	—		—		4	0	64	9
Santos	2025	Série A2	12	2	13	2	2	0	—		3	1	30	5
Career total			135	15	97	15	10	0	6	0	11	2	259	32

== Honours ==
Kindermann

- Campeonato Catarinense de Futebol Feminino: 2017

Botafogo-PB

- Campeonato Paraibano de Futebol Feminino: 2018

Ferroviária

- Campeonato Brasileiro de Futebol Feminino Série A1: 2019

Palmeiras

- Copa Paulista de Futebol Feminino: 2021

Cruzeiro

- Campeonato Mineiro de Futebol Feminino: 2023, 2024

Santos

- Campeonato Brasileiro de Futebol Feminino Série A2: 2025

Brazil U20

- South American U-20 Women's Championship: 2015
