= Evelin Bonifácio =

Brazilian footballer (born 2008)

Personal information
- Full name: Evelin Bonifácio Nascimento
- Date of birth: 8 April 2008 (age 18)
- Place of birth: Peruíbe, Brazil
- Position: Winger

Team information
- Current team: Santos
- Number: 34

Youth career
- 2023–2025: Santos

Senior career*
Years	Team	Apps	(Gls)
2025–	Santos	8	(2)

International career^{‡}
2025	Brazil U17	16	(8)
2025–	Brazil U20	10	(4)
2026–	Brazil	2	(0)
- * Club domestic league appearances and goals as of 19:20, 22 April 2026 (UTC) ‡ National team caps and goals as of 19:20, 22 April 2026 (UTC)

Evelin Bonifácio Nascimento (born 8 April 2008), known as Evelin Bonifácio or just Evelin, is a Brazilian footballer who plays as a winger for Santos and the Brazil national team.

== Club career ==
Born in Peruíbe, São Paulo, Evelin impressed during a local futsal tournament in 2023, and joined the youth sides of Santos. She made her first team debut on 3 September 2025, coming on as a second-half substitute for Thaisinha in a 2–2 Campeonato Paulista home draw against São Paulo.

Evelin scored her first professional goal on 16 November 2025, netting his side's second in a 3–2 away loss to Red Bull Bragantino. Despite only featuring in four matches of the tournament, she was named the breakthrough player of the Paulistão.

On 6 March 2026, Evelin renewed her contract with Sereias until the end of 2027.

== International career ==
In April 2025, Evelin was called up to the Brazil national under-17 team for the 2025 South American U-17 Women's Championship. She was the nation's top scorer in the competition, netting six goals as they finished second. Her performances impressed Arthur Elias, the head coach of the full side, and she was called up for a period of trainings with the squad in June.

Evelin was also called up to the 2025 FIFA U-17 Women's World Cup, and scored a further two goals in the tournament as Brazil finished fourth. In November 2025, she and Santos teammate Samara were called up to the under-20 team.

On 10 April 2026, Evelin was called up to the full side for the 2026 FIFA Series, replacing injured Jheniffer; she was already with the under-20s for a set of friendlies. She made her full international debut four days later, replacing Paloma Maciel late into a 6–1 routing of Zambia.

== Personal life ==
Evelin's younger sister Emily is also a footballer. An attacking midfielder, she also plays for Santos.

== Career statistics ==
=== Club ===
As of 22 April 2026

Appearances and goals by club, season and competition
Club	Season	League			State league		Cup		Continental		Other		Total	
Club	Season	Division	Apps	Goals	Apps	Goals	Apps	Goals	Apps	Goals	Apps	Goals	Apps	Goals
Santos	2025	Série A2	0	0	4	1	0	0	—		1 (Note: Appearance(s) in Copa Paulista de Futebol Feminino)	0	5	1
Santos	2026	Série A1	4	1	0	0	0	0	—		—		4	1
Career total			4	1	4	1	0	0	0	0	1	0	9	2

=== International ===
As of 22 April 2026

National team	Year	Apps	Goals
Brazil	2026	2	0
Total		2	0

== Honours ==
Brazil U20

- South American Under-20 Women's Football Championship: 2026

Individual

- Campeonato Paulista de Futebol Feminino Breakthrough Player: 2025
