= Pardal (footballer, born 1993) =

Brazilian footballer

Personal information
- Full name: Ingrid Carolina Frisanco
- Date of birth: 8 October 1993 (age 33)
- Place of birth: Boituva, Brazil
- Height: 1.73 m (5 ft 8 in)
- Position: Centre-back

Team information
- Current team: Santos
- Number: 33

Youth career
- 2005–2011: Juventus-SP

Senior career*
Years	Team	Apps	(Gls)
2011	Juventus-SP	0	(0)
2012	São Caetano	5	(3)
2013	ABD Botucatu	11	(2)
2013	Botafogo-PB	4	(0)
2014	América de São Manuel	11	(2)
2015	Audax	14	(2)
2015	Centro Olímpico	8	(1)
2016–2017	Audax/Corinthians	52	(5)
2018–2021	Corinthians	111	(9)
2022–2023	São Paulo	49	(8)
2024	Colo-Colo		
2025–	Santos	22	(2)

International career
2008–2010	Brazil U17	4	(0)
2012	Brazil U20	3	(0)
- * Club domestic league appearances and goals as of 21:29, 29 December 2025 (UTC)

Ingrid Carolina Frisanco (born 8 October 1993), commonly known as Pardal, is a Brazilian professional footballer who plays as a centre-back for Santos.

== Club career ==
Born in Boituva, São Paulo, Pardal began her career with Juventus-SP at the age of ten. After becoming a first team member in 2011, she subsequently played for São Caetano, ABD Botucatu, Botafogo-PB, América de São Manuel, Audax and Centro Olímpico

Pardal returned to Audax in 2016, as the club established a partnership with Corinthians. In January 2018, she remained at the club, as Timão established their own women's team.

On 26 January 2022, Pardal signed a one-year contract with São Paulo. On 25 January 2024, she moved abroad for the first time in his career, joining Chilean side Colo-Colo.

On 21 January 2025, Pardal returned to her home country and joined Santos on a two-year deal.

== International career ==
Pardal represented Brazil at under-17 level in the 2008 and 2010 editions of the South American U-17 Women's Championship, winning the latter, and at under-20 level in the 2012 South American U-20 Women's Championship and the 2012 FIFA U-20 Women's World Cup, winning the former. In February 2017, she was called up to the full side by head coach Emily Lima for a training period.

== Career statistics ==
As of 24 December 2025

Appearances and goals by club, season and competition
Club	Season	League			State league		Cup		Continental		Other		Total	
Club	Season	Division	Apps	Goals	Apps	Goals	Apps	Goals	Apps	Goals	Apps	Goals	Apps	Goals
Juventus-SP	2011	Paulista	—		0	0	—		—		—		0	0
São Caetano	2012	Paulista	—		5	3	—		—		—		5	3
ABD Botucatu	2013	Paulista	—		11	2	—		—		—		11	2
Botafogo-PB	2013	Série A1	4	0	—		—		—		—		4	0
América de São Manuel	2014	Paulista	—		11	2	—		—		—		11	2
Audax	2015	Paulista	—		14	2	—		—		—		14	2
Centro Olímpico	2015	Série A1	8	1	—		—		—		—		8	1
Audax/Corinthians	2016	Série A1	2	0	9	1	9	2	—		—		20	2
Audax/Corinthians	2017	Série A1	20	3	21	1	—		4 (Note: Appearance(s) in Copa Libertadores Femenina)	0	—		45	4
Audax/Corinthians	Total		22	3	30	2	9	2	4	0	—		65	6
Corinthians	2018	Série A1	18	1	19	1	—		—		—		37	2
Corinthians	2019	Série A1	21	1	18	3	—		5	0	—		44	4
Corinthians	2020	Série A1	8	0	6	0	—		6	1	—		20	1
Corinthians	2021	Série A1	12	0	9	3	—		4	0	—		25	3
Corinthians	Total		59	2	52	7	—		15	1	—		126	10
São Paulo	2022	Série A1	17	2	9	3	—		—		—		26	5
São Paulo	2023	Série A1	15	2	8	1	—		—		—		23	3
São Paulo	Total		32	4	17	4	—		—		—		49	8
Santos	2025	Série A2	11	1	11	1	2	0	—		1 (Note: Appearance(s) in Copa Paulista de Futebol Feminino)	0	25	2
Career total			136	11	151	23	11	2	19	1	1	0	318	37

== Honours ==
Corinthians (Note: Corinthians had a partnership with Audax from 2016 to 2017. They created their own team for the 2018 season.)

- Copa Libertadores Femenina: 2017, 2019, 2021
- Campeonato Brasileiro de Futebol Feminino Série A1: 2018, 2020, 2021
- Copa do Brasil de Futebol Feminino: 2016
- Campeonato Paulista de Futebol Feminino: 2019, 2020, 2021
- Copa Paulista de Futebol Feminino: 2022

Santos

- Campeonato Brasileiro de Futebol Feminino Série A2: 2025

Brazil U17

- South American U-17 Women's Championship: 2010

Brazil U20

- South American U-20 Women's Championship: 2012
