= Analuyza =

Brazilian footballer (born 2004)

Personal information
- Full name: Analuyza Oliveira França
- Date of birth: 14 April 2004 (age 22)
- Place of birth: Cristalina, Brazil
- Height: 1.60 m (5 ft 3 in)
- Position: Attacking midfielder

Team information
- Current team: Santos
- Number: 17

Youth career
- 2017: Aliança
- 2018–2020: Santos

Senior career*
Years	Team	Apps	(Gls)
2020–2022	Santos	26	(4)
2023–2024	Internacional	34	(4)
2025–	Santos	22	(3)

International career^{‡}
2020	Brazil U17	2	(0)
2022	Brazil U20	9	(3)
- * Club domestic league appearances and goals as of 19:40, 29 December 2025 (UTC) ‡ National team caps and goals as of 04:06, 11 August 2022 (UTC)

Analuyza Oliveira França (born 14 April 2004), simply known as Analuyza, is a Brazilian footballer who plays as an attacking midfielder for Santos.

== Club career ==
Analuyza was born in Cristalina, Goiás, and joined Santos' youth setup in 2018, from local side Aliança. After featuring for the under-18 side, she first appeared with the main squad on 14 September 2020, coming on as a late substitute for Giovanna in a 2–0 Campeonato Brasileiro Série A1 home win over Minas Brasília.

Analuyza scored her first senior goal on 27 September 2020, netting the opener in a 6–0 home routing of Ponte Preta. The following 22 January, she signed her first professional contract with the club.

On 28 December 2022, Analuyza left the club after her contract was due to expire. The following 4 January, she joined Internacional.

On 10 January 2025, Analuyza returned to the Sereias da Vila on a one-year deal.

== Career statistics ==
As of 29 December 2025

Appearances and goals by club, season and competition
Club	Season	League			State league		Cup		Continental		Other		Total	
Club	Season	Division	Apps	Goals	Apps	Goals	Apps	Goals	Apps	Goals	Apps	Goals	Apps	Goals
Santos	2020	Série A1	5	1	4	0	—		—		3 (Note: Appearance(s) in Copa Paulista de Futebol Feminino)	0	12	1
Santos	2021	Série A1	4	0	7	3	—		—		—		11	3
Santos	2022	Série A1	2	0	4	0	—		—		—		6	0
Santos	Total		11	1	15	3	—		—		3	0	29	4
Internacional	2023	Série A1	16	0	6	0	—		6 (Note: Appearance(s) in Copa Libertadores Femenina)	1	2 (Note: Appearance(s) in Supercopa do Brasil de Futebol Feminino)	0	30	1
Internacional	2024	Série A1	9	0	3	4	—		—		1	0	13	4
Internacional	Total		25	0	9	4	—		6	1	3	0	43	5
Santos	2025	Série A2	13	3	9	0	2	2	—		2	0	26	5
Career total			49	4	33	7	2	2	6	1	7	0	97	14

== Honours ==
=== Club ===
Santos

- Copa Paulista de Futebol Feminino: 2020
- Campeonato Brasileiro de Futebol Feminino Série A2: 2025

=== International ===
Brazil U20

- South American Under-20 Women's Football Championship: 2022
