= Jorge Barcellos =

Brazilian football manager

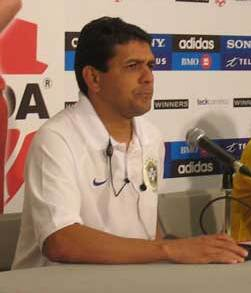
- Barcellos in 2008

Personal information
- Full name: Jorge Luiz Barcellos Martins
- Date of birth: 17 April 1967 (age 59)
- Place of birth: Nova Iguaçu, Brazil

Team information
- Current team: Internacional Women (head coach)

Managerial career
- Years: Team
- 2006: Brazil Women U20
- 2007–2008: Brazil Women
- 2009–2010: Saint Louis Athletica
- 2011–2012: Brazil Women
- 2013–2015: Vasco da Gama Women
- 2016: Boavista U20
- 2016: Queimados
- 2017–2021: Avaí/Kindermann Women
- 2021–2022: Famalicão Women
- 2023: Vasco da Gama Women
- 2024: Botafogo Women
- 2024–: Internacional Women

Jorge Luiz Barcellos Martins (born 17 April 1967) is a Brazilian football coach, currently the head coach of Internacional women's team.

== Career ==
Barcellos was the head coach of the Brazil women's national team at the 2007 FIFA Women's World Cup, 2008 Summer Olympics and 2012 Summer Olympics. He was appointed as head coach of Saint Louis Athletica on 26 August 2008, remaining in his role until the team's folding in May 2010.

== Personal life ==
Barcellos was born in Nova Iguaçu, Brazil, in the municipality now known as Japeri.
