= Gláucio Carvalho =

Brazilian football manager

Personal information
- Full name: Gláucio Gonçalves Carvalho
- Date of birth: 16 January 1968 (age 58)
- Place of birth: Rio de Janeiro, Brazil

Managerial career
- Years: Team
- 2015: Bonsucesso (assistant)
- 2016–2018: Santos (women) (assistant)
- 2019: Jaguariúna (assistant)
- 2019–2022: Botafogo (women)
- 2023: Botafogo (women)
- 2024: Portuguesa-RJ (assistant)
- 2024: 3B da Amazônia (women)
- 2024: Santos (women)

Gláucio Gonçalves Carvalho (born 16 January 1968) is a Brazilian football coach.

== Career ==
Carvalho worked as a fitness coach on several clubs, before being an assistant coach of Caio Couto at Bonsucesso in 2015. He followed Couto to the women's team of Santos in March of that year, working as a fitness and assistant coach at the club.

In February 2019, Carvalho was again in Couto's staff at Jaguariúna, being his assistant. He left the club in April as Couto resigned, and was subsequently named head coach of the women's team of Botafogo.

Carvalho won two Campeonato Carioca de Futebol Feminino titles with Fogão before becoming a coordinator in January 2023. On 25 April, however, he was again named head coach after Gustavo Roma was sacked, and led the club to a promotion in the 2023 Brasileiro Feminino Série A2.

Carvalho left Botafogo on 1 December 2023, due to "personal reasons", and rejoined Couto's staff at the men's side of Portuguesa-RJ in March 2024. Late in that month, however, he was announced as head coach of 3B da Amazônia.

Carvalho resigned from 3B on 16 April 2024, after accepting an "irrefutable" offer. The following day, he returned to the Sereias da Vila after being announced as their head coach.

On 16 September 2024, after failing to avoid the first-ever relegation of the Sereias, Carvalho was dismissed by Santos.

== Honours ==
Botafogo

- Campeonato Carioca de Futebol Feminino: 2020, 2022
