= Rafa Martins =

Brazilian footballer (born 1999)

Personal information
- Full name: Rafaella Carmo Martins
- Date of birth: 17 July 1999 (age 27)
- Place of birth: Santa Luzia, Brazil
- Height: 1.69 m (5 ft 7 in)
- Positions: Centre-back; left-back

Team information
- Current team: Santos
- Number: 40

Youth career
- 2015–2017: São José

Senior career*
Years	Team	Apps	(Gls)
2018–2019	São José	38	(0)
2020–2022	América Mineiro	20	(1)
2023	Minas Brasília	6	(0)
2023–2024	Ljuboten	25	(7)
2024–	Santos	17	(0)
- * Club domestic league appearances and goals as of 17:37, 3 December 2025 (UTC)

Rafaella Carmo Martins (born 17 July 1999), known as Rafa Martins, is a Brazilian footballer who plays as either a centre-back or a left-back for Santos FC.

== Career ==
Born in Santa Luzia, Minas Gerais, Rafa Martins began her career with São José. On 31 January 2020, she joined América Mineiro.

In January 2023, after featuring rarely for América, Rafa Martins was announced at Minas Brasília. In August, however, she moved abroad and joined Macedonian side ŽFK Ljuboten.

On 31 July 2024, Rafa Martins returned to her home country and signed for Santos until the end of the year. On 30 November, she agreed to a new two-year deal.

== Career statistics ==
As of 3 December 2025

Appearances and goals by club, season and competition
Club	Season	League			State league		Cup		Continental		Other		Total	
Club	Season	Division	Apps	Goals	Apps	Goals	Apps	Goals	Apps	Goals	Apps	Goals	Apps	Goals
São José	2018	Série A1	4	0	12	0	—		—		—		16	0
São José	2019	Série A1	10	0	12	0	—		—		3 (Note: Appearance(s) in Copa Paulista de Futebol Feminino)	0	25	0
São José	Total		14	0	24	0	—		—		3	0	41	0
América Mineiro	2020	Série A2	2	1	0	0	—		—		—		2	1
América Mineiro	2021	Série A2	4	0	4	0	—		—		—		8	0
América Mineiro	2022	Série A2	5	0	5	0	—		—		—		10	0
América Mineiro	Total		11	1	9	0	—		—		—		20	1
Minas Brasília	2023	Série A2	6	0	—		—		—		—		6	0
Ljuboten	2023–24	Macedonian Championship	25	7	—		—		2 (Note: Appearance(s) in UEFA Women's Champions League)	0	—		27	7
Santos	2024	Série A1	—		—		—		3 (Note: Appearance(s) in Copa Libertadores Femenina)	1	4	0	7	1
Santos	2025	Série A2	8	0	9	0	2	0	—		3	0	22	0
Santos	Total		8	0	9	0	2	0	3	1	7	0	29	1
Career total			64	8	42	0	2	0	5	1	10	0	123	9

== Honours ==
Ljuboten

- Macedonian Women's Football Championship: 2023–24

Santos

- Copa Paulista de Futebol Feminino: 2024
- Campeonato Brasileiro de Futebol Feminino Série A2: 2025
