= Leidiane =

Brazilian footballer (born 1993)

Personal information
- Full name: Leidiane Machado Cardoso
- Date of birth: 30 August 1993 (age 33)
- Place of birth: Gravataí, Brazil
- Height: 1.65 m (5 ft 5 in)
- Position: Right-back

Youth career
- 2011–2012: São José

Senior career*
| Years | Team | Apps | (Gls) |
| 2013–2014 | Foz Cataratas | 11 | (0) |
| 2015 | Kindermann | | |
| 2015 | Centro Olímpico | 7 | (0) |
| 2015–2017 | Corinthians/Audax | 57 | (2) |
| 2018–2021 | Internacional | 86 | (9) |
| 2022–2023 | Atlético Mineiro | 34 | (3) |
| 2024–2025 | Santos | 31 | (0) |
- * Club domestic league appearances and goals as of 19:21, 29 December 2025 (UTC)

Leidiane Machado Cardoso (born 30 August 1993), known as Leidiane or Leidi, is a Brazilian footballer who plays as a right-back.

== Career ==
Born in Gravataí, Rio Grande do Sul, Leidiane began her career with São José, but made her senior debut with Foz Cataratas in 2013. She subsequently represented Kindermann and Centro Olímpico before joining Audax in 2016, as the club established a partnership with Corinthians.

In the end of the 2017 season, Leidiane moved to Internacional. On 29 January 2021, after winning three Campeonato Gaúcho titles, she renewed her contract with the club.

On 6 January 2022, Leidiane was announced at Atlético Mineiro. On 24 January 2024, she agreed to a two-year contract with Santos.

== Honours ==
Corinthians/Audax

- Copa do Brasil de Futebol Feminino: 2016
- Copa Libertadores Femenina: 2017

Internacional

- Campeonato Gaúcho de Futebol Feminino: 2017, 2019, 2020, 2021

Atlético Mineiro

- Campeonato Mineiro de Futebol Feminino: 2022

Santos

- Copa Paulista de Futebol Feminino: 2024
- Campeonato Brasileiro de Futebol Feminino Série A2: 2025
