= Ingryd Avancini =

Brazilian footballer (born 1998)

Personal information
- Full name: Ingryd Avancini
- Date of birth: 21 December 1998 (age 27)
- Place of birth: São Paulo, Brazil
- Height: 1.73 m (5 ft 8 in)
- Position: Centre-back

Team information
- Current team: Santos
- Number: 21

Youth career
- Juventus-SP
- Portuguesa

Senior career*
Years	Team	Apps	(Gls)
2016	Centro Olímpico	12	(0)
2017	Audax	30	(0)
2017	3B da Amazônia	8	(0)
2018	Flamengo	1	(0)
2019	Audax	19	(2)
2019–2020	Valadares Gaia	13	(2)
2020–2024	Red Bull Bragantino	57	(2)
2025–	Santos	3	(0)

International career
2018	Brazil U20	1	(0)
- * Club domestic league appearances and goals as of 19:59, 29 December 2025 (UTC)

Ingryd Avancini (born 21 December 1998), sometimes known as just Ingryd, is a Brazilian professional footballer who plays as a centre-back for Santos.

== Club career ==
Born in São Paulo, Ingryd played for several clubs as a youth before making her senior debut with Audax in 2017. She later spent a short period at 3B da Amazônia before signing for Flamengo in 2018.

Ingryd returned to Audax ahead of the 2019 season, but moved abroad in August of that year, after joining Valadares Gaia. She returned to her home country in the following year, moving to Red Bull Bragantino.

Ingryd was regularly used for Bragantino until suffering an injury in 2023, spending more than a year sidelined. On 6 December 2024, the club announced her departure at the expiration of her contract.

On 9 January 2025, Ingryd was announced at Santos on a two-year deal.

== International career ==
Ingryd represented the Brazil national under-20 team in the 2018 South American U-20 Women's Championship and the 2018 FIFA U-20 Women's World Cup, but only played one match in the former competition.

== Career statistics ==
As of 29 December 2025

Appearances and goals by club, season and competition
Club	Season	League			State league		Cup		Continental		Other		Total	
Club	Season	Division	Apps	Goals	Apps	Goals	Apps	Goals	Apps	Goals	Apps	Goals	Apps	Goals
Centro Olímpico	2016	Série A1	—		12	0	—		—		—		12	0
Audax	2017	Série A1	12	0	18	0	—		—		—		30	0
3B da Amazônia	2017	Amazonense	—		8	0	—		—		—		8	0
Flamengo	2018	Série A1	0	0	1	0	—		—		—		1	0
Audax	2019	Série A1	11	1	8	1	—		—		—		19	2
Valadares Gaia	2019–20	Campeonato Nacional	13	2	—		2	0	—		—		15	2
Red Bull Bragantino	2020	Paulista	—		9	0	—		—		—		9	0
Red Bull Bragantino	2021	Série A2	13	2	6	0	—		—		2 (Note: Appearance(s) in Copa Paulista de Futebol Feminino)	0	21	2
Red Bull Bragantino	2022	Série A1	14	0	9	0	—		—		—		23	0
Red Bull Bragantino	2023	Série A2	0	0	0	0	—		—		—		0	0
Red Bull Bragantino	2024	Série A1	3	0	3	0	—		—		1	0	7	0
Red Bull Bragantino	Total		30	2	27	0	—		—		3	0	60	0
Santos	2025	Série A2	3	0	0	0	0	0	—		0	0	3	0
Career total			69	5	74	1	2	0	0	0	3	0	148	6

== Honours ==
Flamengo

- Campeonato Carioca de Futebol Feminino: 2018

Red Bull Bragantino

- Campeonato Brasileiro de Futebol Feminino Série A2: 2023

Santos

- Campeonato Brasileiro de Futebol Feminino Série A2: 2025

Brazil U20

- South American U-20 Women's Championship: 2018
