= Avancini =

Avancini is a surname. Notable people with the surname include:

- Henrique Avancini (born 1989), Brazilian mountain bike racer and road cyclist
- Ingryd Avancini (born 1998), Brazilian professional footballer
- Lívia Avancini (born 1992), Brazilian athlete specialising in the shot put
- Nicola Avancini (1611–1686), Italian Jesuit cleric, playwright, and ascetical writer
