= Samara (footballer) =

Brazilian footballer (born 2006)

Personal information
- Full name: Samara Venceslau Carneiro
- Date of birth: 4 October 2006 (age 20)
- Place of birth: Rio Verde, Brazil
- Positions: Right-back; winger

Team information
- Current team: Santos
- Number: 13

Youth career
- 2021–2024: Ferroviária
- 2024–2025: Santos

Senior career*
Years	Team	Apps	(Gls)
2024–	Santos	26	(1)

International career^{‡}
2025–	Brazil U20	7	(0)
- * Club domestic league appearances and goals as of 14:46, 3 December 2025 (UTC) ‡ National team caps and goals as of 20:17, 23 March 2026 (UTC)

Samara Venceslau Carneiro (born 4 October 2006), simply known as Samara, is a Brazilian footballer who plays for Santos as either a right-back or a right winger.

== Club career ==
Born in Rio Verde, Goiás, Samara began her career at a futsal side in her hometown, before joining the youth categories of Ferroviária at the age of 14. In 2024, she moved to Santos, initially a member of the under-20 team.

Samara made her first team debut on 14 August 2024, starting in a 4–1 Campeonato Paulista away loss to former side Ferroviária. Ahead of the 2025 season, she was promoted to the first team by head coach Caio Couto and started to feature regularly.

On 26 December 2025, Samara renewed her contract with the Sereias da Vila until 2027.

== International career ==
In June 2025, Samara was called up to the Brazil national under-20 team for a period of trainings. She played in a friendly match against Mexico in October, and received another call-up in November.

== Career statistics ==
As of 3 December 2025

Appearances and goals by club, season and competition
Club	Season	League			State league		Cup		Continental		Other		Total	
Club	Season	Division	Apps	Goals	Apps	Goals	Apps	Goals	Apps	Goals	Apps	Goals	Apps	Goals
Santos	2024	Série A1	0	0	1	0	—		—		—		1	0
Santos	2025	Série A2	13	1	12	0	2	0	—		1 (Note: Appearance(s) in Copa Paulista de Futebol Feminino)	0	28	1
Career total			13	1	13	0	2	0	0	0	1	0	29	1

== Honours ==
Santos

- Campeonato Brasileiro de Futebol Feminino Série A2: 2025

Brazil U20

- South American Under-20 Women's Football Championship: 2026
