= Nicole Marussi =

Brazilian footballer

Personal information
- Full name: Nicole Marussi Reis Camargo
- Date of birth: 26 January 2004 (age 22)
- Place of birth: Salto, Brazil
- Height: 1.60 m (5 ft 3 in)
- Position: Midfielder

Team information
- Current team: Juventude (on loan from Corinthians)

Youth career
- –2022: Santos
- 2023–2024: Corinthians

Senior career*
| Years | Team | Apps | (Gls) |
| 2020–2022 | Santos | 14 | (1) |
| 2023– | Corinthians | 9 | (0) |
| 2025 | → Santos (loan) | 10 | (3) |
| 2026– | → Juventude (loan) | 0 | (0) |
- * Club domestic league appearances and goals as of 19:45, 29 December 2025 (UTC)

Nicole Marussi Reis Camargo (born 26 January 2004), known as Nicole Marussi, is a Brazilian footballer who plays as a midfielder for Juventude on loan from Corinthians.

== Career ==
Marussi was born in Salto, São Paulo, and represented Santos as a youth. She made her first team debut on 14 September 2020, coming on as a late substitute for Gabrielly in a 2–0 home win over Minas Brasília.

Marussi scored her first senior goal on 13 December 2020, netting the opener in a 2–0 home win over São Paulo, for the year's Copa Paulista. The following 22 January, she signed her first professional contract with Santos.

On 28 December 2022, Marussi left the club after her contract was due to expire. Exactly one month later, she joined Corinthians, being initially assigned to the youth setup.

On 23 January 2025, Marussi returned to the Sereias da Vila on loan for the season.

== Honours ==
Santos

- Copa Paulista de Futebol Feminino: 2020
- Campeonato Brasileiro de Futebol Feminino Série A2: 2025

Corinthians

- Campeonato Paulista de Futebol Feminino: 2023
- Campeonato Brasileiro de Futebol Feminino Série A1: 2024
