= 2016 Copa do Brasil de Futebol Feminino =

Tournament details
- Country: Brazil
- Teams: 32

Final positions
- Champions: Corinthians/Audax
- Runners-up: São José

Tournament statistics
- Matches played: 232
- Goals scored: 58 (0.25 per match)
- Top goal scorer(s): Francisleide (Corinthians/Audax, 11 goals)

The 2016 Copa do Brasil de Futebol Feminino was the tenth staging of the competition. The competition started on August 24, 2016, and concluded on October 26, 2016. 32 clubs of all regions of Brazil participated of the cup, which was organized by the Brazilian Football Confederation (CBF).

It was the last staging of the competition, as it was abolished the next year.

== Competition format ==
The competition is contested by 32 clubs in a knock-out format where all rounds are played over two legs and the away goals rule was used, but in the first two rounds, if the away team won the first leg with an advantage of at least three goals, the second leg would not be played and the club automatically qualified to the next round.

== Participating teams ==
State federation	Team	Qualifying method
(Acre (state)) Acre	Atlético Acreano	2015 State Championship champion
Alagoas	União Desportiva	2015 State Championship champion
Amapá	Oratório	2015 State Championship champion
(Amazonas (Brazilian state)) Amazonas	Iranduba	2015 State Championship champion
Bahia	São Francisco	2015 State Championship champion
Ceará	Caucaia	2015 State Championship champion
(Federal District (Brazil)) Distrito Federal	CRESSPOM	2015 State Championship champion
Espírito Santo	Vila Nova	2015 State Championship champion
Goiás	Aliança	2015 State Championship champion
Maranhão	JV Lideral	2015 State Championship champion
Mato Grosso	Mixto	2015 State Championship champion
Mato Grosso do Sul	Comercial	2015 State Championship champion
Minas Gerais	Ipatinga	2015 State Championship champion
Pará	Pinheirense	2015 State Championship champion
Paraíba	Botafogo-PB	2015 State Championship champion
(Paraná (state)) Paraná	Foz Cataratas	2015 State Championship champion
Pernambuco	Náutico	2015 State Championship champion
Pernambuco	Vitória das Tabocas	2015 State Championship runner-up
Piauí	Tiradentes	2015 State Championship champion
(Rio de Janeiro (state)) Rio de Janeiro	Flamengo	2015 State Championship champion
(Rio de Janeiro (state)) Rio de Janeiro	Barcelona	2015 State Championship runner-up
Rio Grande do Norte	União	2015 State Championship champion
Rio Grande do Sul	Estância Velha	2015 State Championship champion
Rondônia	Porto	2015 State Championship champion
Roraima	São Raimundo-RR	2015 State Championship champion
(São Paulo (state)) São Paulo	São José	2015 State Championship champion
(São Paulo (state)) São Paulo	Corinthians/Audax^{[a]}	2015 State Championship third-place
(São Paulo (state)) São Paulo	Santos	2015 State Championship fourth-place
(Santa Catarina (state)) Santa Catarina	Chapecoense	2015 State Championship champion
(Santa Catarina (state)) Santa Catarina	Araranguá	2015 State Championship runner-up
Sergipe	Boca Júnior	2015 State Championship champion
Tocantins	Intercap	2015 State Championship champion

a. Audax joined a partnership with Corinthians to participate in the 2016 edition of the competition, thus being represented by them.

== Table ==
- In italics, the home teams in the first legs of each round.

Round of 32
Vila Nova-ES	4	1	5
Ipatinga	0	1	1
Oratório	0
Flamengo	7
Corinthians/Audax	9	2	11
Pinheirense	0	0	0
Santos	10	11	21
Mixto	0	0	0
Náutico	0	1	1
Botafogo-PB	1	3	4
Boca Júnior	0
São Francisco	15
Estância Velha	2	2	4
Chapecoense	2	3	5
Araranguá	1	0	1
Foz Cataratas	1	3	4
Barcelona^{[b]}	1	5	6
Comercial	0	3	3
União Desportiva	2	2	4
Vitória das Tabocas	4	3	7
CRESSPOM	7	1	8
Aliança	0	1	1
São Raimundo-RR	0	0	0
Iranduba	1	5	6
JV Lideral (pen. 5–3)	2	2	4
Tiradentes	2	2	4
União^{[b]}	3	4	7
Caucaia	1	2	3
Porto	1	0	1
Atlético Acreano	1	1	2
Intercap	1	0	1
São José	2	3	5

Round of 16
Vila Nova-ES	0
Flamengo	6
Corinthians/Audax	3	2	5
Santos	0	2	2
Botafogo-PB	0	0	0
São Francisco	1	0	1
Chapecoense	0	0	0
Foz Cataratas	1	5	6
Comercial	10	11	21
Mixto	0	0	0
CRESSPOM (a)	1	1	2
Iranduba	0	2	2
JV Lideral	6	3	9
Caucaia	0	0	0
Atlético Acreano	0
São José	13

Quarterfinals
Flamengo	1	0	1
Corinthians/Audax	1	1	2
São Francisco	0	2	2
Foz Cataratas	0	6	6
Vitória das Tabocas	0	0	0
CRESSPOM	1	2	3
JV Lideral	0	0	0
São José	1	5	6

Semifinals
Corinthians/Audax	2	1	3
CRESSPOM	0	2	2
Foz Cataratas	1	2	3
São José	1	4	5

Finals
Corinthians/Audax	2	3	5
São José	2	1	3

b. Barcelona and União were excluded from the competition after fielding ineligible players.

== Final ==
October 19
19:00 (UTC-3)

São José	2 – 2	Corinthians/Audax
Raquel 2'; Rosana 55'		Paulinha 21'; Ingrid 48'

Estádio Martins Pereira, São José dos Campos
Referee: Katiucia da Mota Lima (SP)

October 26
19:30 (UTC-3)

Corinthians/Audax	3 – 1	São José

Estádio José Liberatti, Osasco

2016 Copa do Brasil de Futebol Feminino

Corinthians/Audax
Champion
First title
