= Estádio Jayme Cintra =

Soccer stadium in Jundiaí, Brazil

Coordinates: 23°11′17.91″S 46°51′33.41″W

Estádio Dr. Jayme Cintra
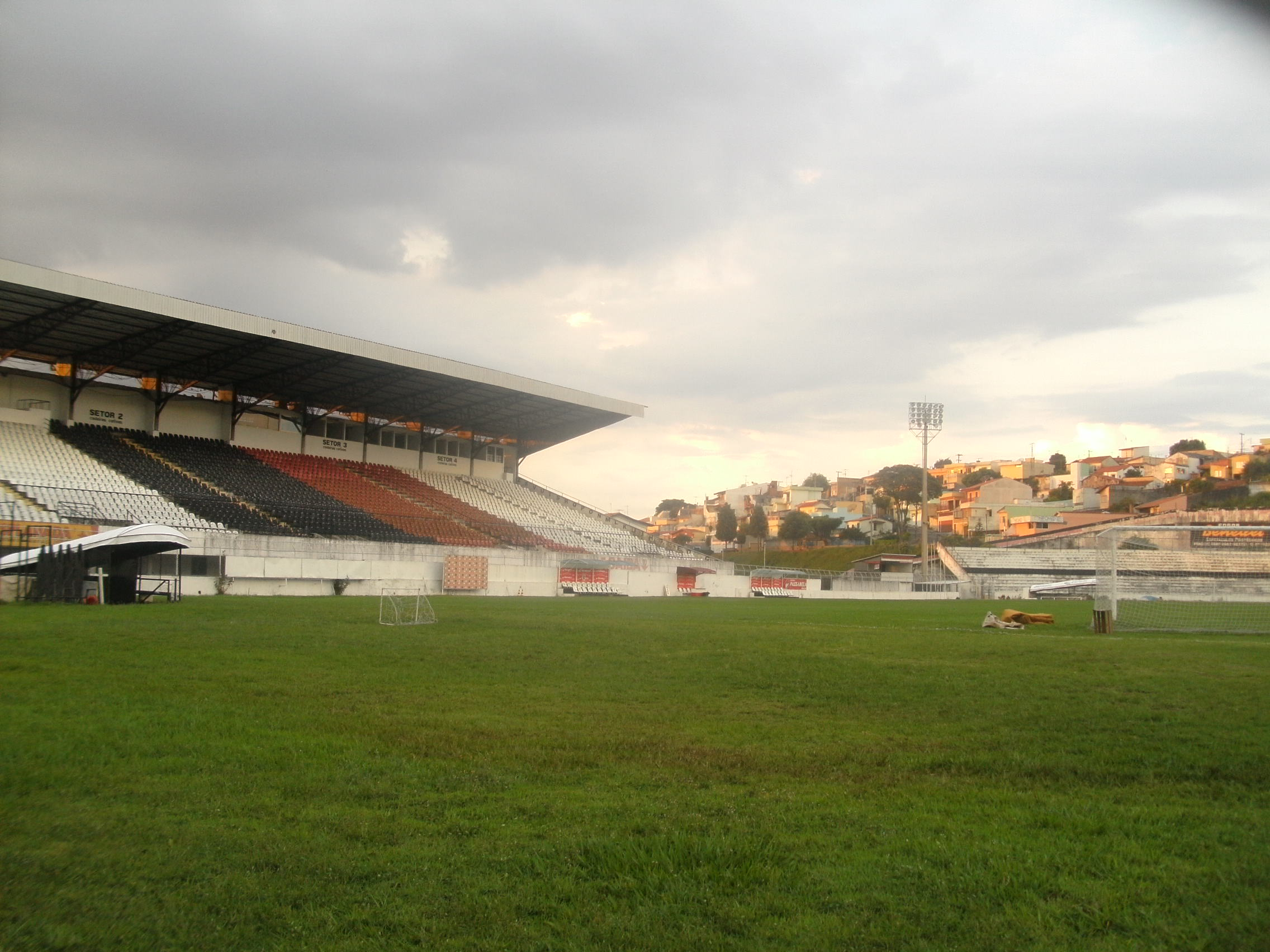
- Sisbrace
- Interactive map of Estádio Dr. Jayme Cintra
- Full name: Estádio Dr. Jayme Cintra
- Location: Jundiaí, São Paulo state, Brazil
- Owner: Municipality of Jundiaí
- Capacity: 14,000
- Surface: Synthetic grass
- Field size: 105 by 68 metres (114.8 yd × 74.4 yd)
- Public transit: Jundiaí

Construction
- Built: 1957
- Opened: May 30, 1957

Tenant
- Paulista Futebol Clube

Estádio Dr. Jayme Cintra, usually known as Estádio Jayme Cintra, is a stadium in Jundiaí, Brazil owned by Paulista Futebol Clube and used to the team matches. The stadium has a maximum capacity of 15,000 people and is named after a Companhia Paulista de Estradas de Ferro ("São Paulo Railroad Company") president.

== History ==
In 1957, construction on Estádio Jayme Cintra was completed. The inaugural match was played on May 30 of that year, when Paulista beat Palmeiras 3–1. The first goal of the stadium was scored by Paulista's Belmiro. The stadium's attendance record currently stands at 28,473, set on March 2, 1969, when Santos beat Paulista 2–1.
