= Campeonato Catarinense de Futebol Feminino =

Women's football league in Santa Catarina, Brazil

Campeonato Gaúcho Feminino
- Founded: 2007
- Country: Brazil
- Confederation: Federação Catarinense de Futebol
- Promotion to: Brasileiro Série A3
- Current champions: Avaí (6th title) (2025)
- Most championships: Kindermann (13 titles; three as Avaí/Kindermann)
- Current: 2025

The Campeonato Catarinense de Futebol Feminino is the women's football state championship of Santa Catarina State, and is contested since 2007.

== List of champions ==
Following is the list with all recognized titles of Campeonato Catarinense Feminino:

Season	Champions	Runners-up
2007	Olympya (1)	Scorpions
2008	Kindermann (1)	Avaí
2009	Kindermann (2)	Olympya
2010	Kindermann (3)	Olympya
2011	Kindermann (4)	Olympya
2012	Kindermann (5)	Olympya
2013	Kindermann (6)	Vasto Verde
2014	Kindermann (7)	Chapecoense
2015	Kindermann (8)	Araranguá
2016	Not held	
2017	Kindermann (9)	Napoli
2018	Kindermann (10)	Chapecoense
2019	Avaí/Kindermann (11)	Napoli
2020	Not held due COVID-19 pandemic in Brazil	
2021	Avaí/Kindermann (12)	Criciúma
2022	Avaí/Kindermann (13)	Criciúma
2023	Avaí (4)	Fluminense
2024	Avaí (5)	Criciúma
2025	Avaí (6)	Criciúma

Note

- On 25 February 2019, Avaí FC partnered with SE Kindermann, remained as Avaí/Kindermann until 19 June 2023, when Avaí FC full incorporated the SE Kindermann.

== Titles by team ==
Teams in bold stills active.

Rank	Club	Winners	Winning years
1	Kindermann	13	2008, 2009, 2010, 2011, 2012, 2013, 2014, 2015, 2017, 2018, 2019*, 2021*, 2022*
2	**Avaí**	6	2019*, 2021*, 2022*, 2023, 2024, 2025
3	Olympya	1	2007

=== By city ===
City	Championships	Clubs
Caçador	16	Kindermann (10), Avaí/Kindermann (3), Avaí (3)
Jaraguá do Sul	1	Olympya (1)
