= Clube Atlético Mineiro (women) =

Women's football club based in Belo Horizonte, Minas Gerais, Brazil

Atlético Mineiro
- Full name: Clube Atlético Mineiro
- Nicknames: Vingadoras; Galo Feminino
- Founded: 2005
- Ground: Estádio das Alterosas
- Capacity: 2,000
- President: Sérgio Coelho
- Head coach: Fabi Guedes
- League: Campeonato Brasileiro Série A1; Campeonato Mineiro
- 2025 2025: Série A2, 4th of 16 (promoted); Mineiro, 5th of 7
Home colours	Away colours

Clube Atlético Mineiro, commonly known as Atlético Mineiro or Vingadoras, is a Brazilian women's Association football club, based in the city of Belo Horizonte, Minas Gerais. They won the Campeonato Mineiro de Futebol Feminino nine times.

== History ==
Initially created in 1983 as an amateur women's side of Clube Atlético Mineiro to play in an experimental inaugural season of the Campeonato Mineiro de Futebol Feminino, the women's section of the club was officially created in 2005, the year which the Mineiro Feminino officially started.

Atlético's women's team was dissolved in 2012, due to lack of funding. On 19 December 2018, the club announced the return of the women's section, after CONMEBOL obliged all men's teams to have a senior women's team playing in a competition.

== Players ==
=== Current squad ===
As of 12 April 2026.

Note: Flags indicate national team as defined under FIFA eligibility rules; some limited exceptions apply. Players may hold more than one non-FIFA nationality.

No.	Pos.	Nation	Player
1	GK	BRA	Maike Weber
2	DF	BRA	Nine
3	DF	MEX	Vanessa López
4	DF	BRA	Káren Bender
5	MF	BRA	Ju Pacheco
6	DF	BRA	Diovanna
7	FW	BRA	Kélen Bender
8	MF	BRA	Laura Maria
9	FW	BRA	Anny Marabá
10	MF	BRA	Isa Freitas
11	FW	BRA	Day Silva
12	GK	BRA	Iasmin Paixão
13	MF	BRA	Larissa Nunes
14	DF	BRA	Bárbara Melo
15	MF	BRA	Marta

No.	Pos.	Nation	Player
16	DF	BRA	Karol Dias
17	FW	BRA	Amália
18	MF	PAR	Cindy Ramos
20	MF	BRA	Lari Sanchez
21	MF	COL	Carol Arbeláez
22	GK	PAR	Isabel Ortiz
23	DF	BRA	Hingredy
24	DF	BRA	Karen Cristina
25	DF	BRA	Giovanna Barraca
26	DF	BRA	Tayane Fabiano
27	FW	BRA	Thalita
28	FW	BRA	Kaiuska
33	MF	BRA	Maiara
55	FW	BRA	Pimenta

== Honours ==
=== Official tournaments ===
State
Competitions	Titles	Seasons
Campeonato Mineiro	9	1983, 2006, 2009, 2010, 2011, 2012, 2020, 2021, 2022

- record

== See also ==
- Clube Atlético Mineiro
