= Avaí FC (women) =

Brazilian football club

Avaí FC Feminino
- Kindermann/Avaí badge
- Full name: Avaí Futebol Clube Feminino
- Founded: 25 February 2019; 7 years ago (as Avaí/Kindermann); 19 June 2023; 3 years ago (officially independent)
- Ground: Estádio Salézio Kindermann, Caçador
- Capacity: 6,500
- Chairman: Edison Roberto de Souza
- Head coach: Carine Bosetti
- League: Campeonato Brasileiro Série A2; Campeonato Catarinense
- 2025 2025: Série A2, 12th of 16; Catarinense, 1st of 8 (champions)
- Website: website
Home colours	Away colours

Avaí Futebol Clube Feminino, commonly known as Avaí FC Feminino, is a women's football club based in Caçador, Santa Catarina. The club was formerly known as Avaí/Kindermann due to the partnership with SE Kindermann from 2019 to 2022.

== History ==
On 25 February 2019, the most successful women's team in Santa Catarina, the Sociedade Esportiva Kindermann, started a partnership with Avaí, therefore between 2019 and 2021 the team was called Avaí/Kindermann (or Kindermann/Avaí). The partnership was successful and the team was third place in the 2019 Campeonato Feminino Série A1 and runners-up in 2020. Kindermann/Avaí qualified for the 2020 and 2021 Copa Libertadores Femenina being eliminated in the group stage and the quarter-finals, respectively.

As the SE Kindermann president Salézio Kindermann died from the COVID-19, on 15 May 2021, the Kindermann family took control of the team until the participation in the 2021 Libertadores Femenina, on 18 November 2021. After the 2021 Copa Libertadores the team was disbanded but in January 2022, Avaí assured the continuity of the team and its participation in the 2022 Série A1.

On 8 February 2022, the club was renamed to Avaí Futebol Clube Feminino, but CBF and FCF rolled back the decision due to Sociedade Esportiva Kindermann were the owner of the berths in the local and national tournaments and the team was called Avaí/Kindermann in the 2022 season. Avaí officially took control of Sociedade Esportiva Kindermann on 19 June 2023. Although the team was initially supposed to leave Caçador and move to Florianópolis for the 2023 season, they decided to stay in Caçador.

== Players ==
=== First team ===
As of 27 February 2024

Note: Flags indicate national team as defined under FIFA eligibility rules; some limited exceptions apply. Players may hold more than one non-FIFA nationality.

No.	Pos.	Nation	Player
1	GK	BRA	Maike
2	DF	BRA	Raquelzinha
3	DF	BRA	Thaiane
4	DF	BRA	Júlia
5	MF	BRA	Chai
6	DF	BRA	Júlia Cipriani
7	MF	URU	Camila López
8	MF	BRA	Bárbara
9	FW	BRA	Brendha
10	MF	URU	Julieta Morales
11	MF	PAR	Ramona Martínez
12	GK	BRA	Lucilene

No.	Pos.	Nation	Player
13	DF	URU	Sofía Ramondegui
14	DF	BRA	Raquel Beatriz
15	DF	BRA	Dani Venturini
16	DF	BRA	Kaila
17	FW	PAR	Lule González
18	DF	BRA	Miriam
19	DF	BRA	Siméia (captain)
20	FW	BRA	Michelle
21	MF	BRA	Joyce
23	FW	PAR	Belén Riveros
—	GK	BRA	Quezia Proença
—	DF	COL	Mafe Linares

== Honours ==
=== Official tournaments ===
State
Competitions	Titles	Seasons
Campeonato Catarinense	6	2019*, 2021*, 2022*, 2023, 2024, 2025

*: Won as Avaí/Kindermann

== See also ==
- Avaí FC
