= Campeonato Carioca de Futebol Feminino =

Football league in Rio de Janeiro, Brazil

- Founded: 1983
- Country: Brazil
- Confederation: CBF; Federação de Futebol do Estado do Rio de Janeiro
- Domestic cup: Copa do Brasil de Futebol Feminino
- Current champions: Flamengo (2025)
- Most championships: Flamengo (9 titles)
- Website: www.fferj.com.br
- Current: 2023 Campeonato Carioca de Futebol Feminino

The Campeonato Carioca de Futebol Feminino (Carioca Women's Football Championship), organized by the Rio de Janeiro State Football Federation (FFERJ), is the women's football state championship of Rio de Janeiro State. It has contested since 1983.

The four most important Rio de Janeiro men's football teams (Vasco da Gama, Flamengo, Botafogo and Fluminense) contested in all editions of the competition between 1996 and 2000. In 2006, the four most important Rio de Janeiro clubs did not dispute the competition, and in 2007 only Botafogo participated in the competition.

Two unofficial competitions were also contested, Torneio de Rio das Ostras (Rio das Ostras Tournament), which had Flamengo as the champion of the only edition disputed, in 1999, and Torneio Início (Start Tournament), which had Vasco da Gama winning in 1999 and 2000, the only editions of the tournament.

== List of champions ==
=== Campeonato Carioca de Futebol Feminino ===
| Year | Winner |
|---|---|
| 1983 | Radar |
| 1984 | Radar |
| 1985 | Radar |
| 1986 | Radar |
| 1987 | Radar |
| 1988 | Radar |
| 1996 | Vasco da Gama |
| 1997 (FFERJ) | Vasco da Gama |
| 1998 | Vasco da Gama |
| 1999 | Vasco da Gama |
| 2000 | Vasco da Gama |
| 2001 | Barra |
| 2004 (AFFER) | Campo Grande |
| 2005 (FFERJ/LND) | CEPE-Caxias |
| 2006 | CEPE-Caxias |
| 2007 | CEPE-Caxias |
| 2008 | Campo Grande |
| 2009 | Volta Redonda |
| 2010 | Vasco da Gama |
| 2011 | CEPE-Caxias |
| 2012 | Vasco da Gama |
| 2013 | Vasco da Gama |
| 2014 | Botafogo |
| 2015 | Flamengo |
| 2016 | Flamengo |
| 2017 | Flamengo |
| 2018 | Flamengo |
| 2019 | Flamengo |
| 2020 | Botafogo |
| 2021 | Flamengo |
| 2022 | Botafogo |
| 2023 | Flamengo |
| 2024 | Flamengo |
| 2025 | Flamengo |

=== Torneio de Rio das Ostras ===
| Year | Winner |
|---|---|
| 1999 | Flamengo |

=== Torneio Início ===
| Year | Winner |
|---|---|
| 2000 | Vasco da Gama |
| 2001 | Vasco da Gama |
