= Brazil women's national under-20 football team =

National association football team

Brazil
- Nickname: A Seleção (The Selection)
- Association: Confederação Brasileira de Futebol (CBF)
- Confederation: CONMEBOL (South America)
- Head coach: Camilla Orlando
- FIFA code: BRA
First colours	Second colours

First international
- Mexico 3–5 Brazil (Vancouver, Canada; 17 August 2002)

Biggest win
- Bolivia 0–10 Brazil (La Calera, Chile; 9 April 2022)

Biggest defeat
- Brazil 1–5 Germany (Montreal, Canada; 12 August 2014); Brazil 0–4 Japan (California, United States; 4 June 2015)

South American Under-20 Women's Football Championship
- Appearances: 12 (first in 2004)
- Best result: Champions (2004, 2006, 2008, 2010, 2012, 2014, 2015, 2018, 2022, 2024, 2026)

FIFA U-20 Women's World Cup
- Appearances: 12 (first in 2002)
- Best result: Third place (2006, 2022)

The Brazil U-20 women's national football team is a youth football team operated under the Brazilian Football Confederation. Its primary role is the development of players in preparation for the Brazil women's national football team. In the history of u-20 national team, the Brazilians won all editions of the South American Under-20 Women's Football Championship 2004, 2006, 2008, 2010, 2012, 2014, 2015, 2018, 2022, 2024 and 2026.

The best placement of the Brazil U-20 in the FIFA U-20 Women's World Cup was in 2006 and 2022, when the Brazilians won the bronze medal.

== History ==
=== 2006 ===
In 2006, the Brazil U-20 team played in the 2006 FIFA U-20 Women's World Championship in Russia; however, the team finished in third place. They beat the United States and became third in this tournament. Many members of that 2006 team have made appearances for the senior national team.

== Fixtures and results ==
Legend

Win Draw Lose Fixture

=== 2026 ===
5 February CONMEBOL U-20	Brazil	3–2	Ecuador	Estadio Luis Alfonso Giagni, Villa Elisa, Paraguay
18:00	Carioca 60'; Brendha 80'; Beatriz 90+3'	Report	Vélez 45'; Cazares 89' (pen.)	Referee: Paula Fernández (Colombia)

7 February CONMEBOL U-20	Bolivia	0–5	Brazil	Estadio Luis Alfonso Giagni, Villa Elisa, Paraguay
18:00		Report	Clarinha 5'; Evelin 26', 36'; Vitorinha 68'; Gisele 90'

11 February CONMEBOL U-20	Peru	0–6	Brazil	Estadio Luis Alfonso Giagni, Villa Elisa, Paraguay
18:00		Report	Thaynara 16'; Nogueira 35', 76'; Adrielly 43'; Dudinha 45+2'; Brendha 78'

13 February CONMEBOL U-20	Brazil	1–2	Argentina	Estadio Luis Alfonso Giagni, Villa Elisa, Paraguay
	Brendha 7'	Report	García 15'; Núñez 78'

16 February CONMEBOL U-20	Paraguay	1–3	Brazil	CARFEM, Ypané, Paraguay
18:00	Bareiro 60'	Report	Nogueira 4'; Nayara 17'; Tainá 63'

19 February CONMEBOL U-20	Colombia	0–1	Brazil	CARFEM, Ypané, Paraguay
20:00		Report	Vitorinha 54'

22 February CONMEBOL U-20	Brazil	4–0	Argentina	Estadio Luis Alfonso Giagni, Villa Elisa, Paraguay
20:00	Evelin 3'; Clarinha 35'; Brendha 64'; Carioca 90+2'	Report

25 February CONMEBOL U-20	Ecuador	1–1	Brazil	CARFEM, Ypané, Paraguay
18:00	Thaynara 68' (o.g.)	Report	Vitorinha 12'

28 February CONMEBOL U-20	Brazil	2–0	Venezuela	CARFEM, Ypané, Paraguay
22:00	Tainá 19'; Clarinha 37'	Report

11 April Friendly	United States	2–0	Brazil	Kansas City, Missouri, United States
	Ullmark 23'; Ascanio	Report		Stadium: CPKC Stadium

15 April Friendly	United States	1–1	Brazil	Kansas City, Missouri, United States
	Ascanio 23'	Report	14' Vitorinha	Stadium: CPKC Stadium; Referee: Drew Kemp

- "Fixtures and results (Brazil Under 20)". Soccerway.

== Current squad ==
The following players were named to the squad for two friendlies against the United States on 11 and 15 April.

Caps and goals as of 15 April 2026, after the match against the United States. Players in bold were already called up to the senior team.

No.	Pos.	Player	Date of birth (age)	Caps	Goals	Club
1	GK	Josi Bencke	19 May 2008 (age 18)	0	0	(Brazilian Football Confederation) Grêmio
2	DF	Allyne	14 June 2008 (age 18)	0	0	(Brazilian Football Confederation) Grêmio
3	DF	Sofia	2 August 2007 (age 19)	10	0	(Brazilian Football Confederation) Flamengo
4	DF	Ana Bia	30 April 2006 (age 20)	7	0	(Brazilian Football Confederation) São Paulo
5	MF	Nayara	23 October 2006 (age 20)	8	1	(Brazilian Football Confederation) Botafogo
6	DF	Isa Nunes	12 June 2007 (age 19)	3	0	(Brazilian Football Confederation) Flamengo
7	FW	Gisele	20 May 2007 (age 19)	22	4	(Brazilian Football Confederation) Grêmio
8	MF	Nogueira	20 January 2008 (age 18)	8	3	(Brazilian Football Confederation) Ferroviária
9	FW	Brendha	17 December 2006 (age 19)	11	4	(Brazilian Football Confederation) Flamengo
10	MF	Vitorinha	20 November 2006 (age 19)	9	4	(Brazilian Football Confederation) São Paulo
11	FW	Dudinha	27 January 2006 (age 20)	9	1	(Brazilian Football Confederation) Ferroviária
12	GK	Ana Morganti	30 November 2008 (age 17)	1	0	(Brazilian Football Confederation) Corinthians
13	DF	Ana Elisa	12 June 2007 (age 19)	2	0	(Brazilian Football Confederation) Ferroviária
14	FW	Giovana Canali	12 February 2006 (age 20)	8	0	(United States Soccer Federation) Virginia Cavaliers
15	DF	Bianca	17 May 2006 (age 20)	9	0	(Brazilian Football Confederation) Internacional
16	MF	Clarinha	16 January 2006 (age 20)	9	3	(Portuguese Football Federation) Benfica
17	FW	Isabela Puccinelli		1	0	(United States Soccer Federation) Arizona State Sun Devils
18	FW	Juju Harris	18 January 2007 (age 19)	2	0	(United States Soccer Federation) Clemson Tigers
19	FW	Tainá	30 November 2006 (age 19)	9	2	(Brazilian Football Confederation) Ferroviária
20	MF	Adrielly	16 January 2007 (age 19)	7	1	(Brazilian Football Confederation) Fluminense
21	MF	Julia Vaini	5 April 2007 (age 19)	1	0	(Brazilian Football Confederation) São Paulo
22	DF	Thay	20 March 2006 (age 20)	11	1	(Brazilian Football Confederation) Botafogo
23	GK	Elu	8 June 2006 (age 20)	10	0	(Brazilian Football Confederation) São Paulo

=== Recent call-ups ===
The following players were named to a squad in the last 12 months.

Pos.	Player	Date of birth (age)	Caps	Goals	Club	Latest call-up
GK	Isa Faichel	7 March 2007 (age 19)	1	0	(Brazil) Ferroviária	v. United States, 11 April 2026^{INJ}
DF	Samara	4 October 2006 (age 20)	7	0	(Brazil) Santos	2026 South American Under-20 Championship
DF	Sara	27 November 2007 (age 18)	1	0	(Brazil) Santos	2026 South American Under-20 Championship
MF	Dulce	28 February 2008 (age 18)	0	0	(Brazil) Corinthians	v. United States, 11 April 2026^{INJ}
MF	Julia Faria	26 April 2008 (age 18)	0	0	(Brazil) Corinthians	v. United States, 11 April 2026^{INJ}
MF	**Kaylane**	8 December 2008 (age 17)	7	0	(Brazil) Flamengo	2026 South American Under-20 Championship
MF	Emilly	11 February 2007 (age 19)	6	0	(Brazil) Flamengo	2026 South American Under-20 Championship
MF	Julia Martins	29 June 2007 (age 19)	0	0	(Brazil) Grêmio	2026 South American Under-20 Championship
FW	**Evelin**	8 April 2008 (age 18)	10	4	(Brazil) Santos	v. United States, 11 April 2026^{UNV}
FW	Carioca	26 February 2006 (age 20)	7	2	(Brazil) Fluminense	2026 South American Under-20 Championship
^{INJ} = Withdrew due to injury; ^{PRE}: Preliminary squad / standby; ^{UNV} = Unavailable for selection

== Competitive record ==
=== FIFA U-20 Women's World Cup ===
Year	Result	GP	W	D*	L	GF	GA
(Canada) 2002	Fourth place	6	4	2	0	16	8
(Thailand) 2004	Fourth place	6	3	0	3	10	12
(Russia) 2006	Third place	6	2	3	1	4	2
(Chile) 2008	Quarter-finals	4	3	0	1	13	5
(Germany) 2010	Group stage	3	1	1	1	5	3
(Japan) 2012	Group stage	3	0	2	1	2	4
(Canada) 2014	Group stage	3	0	1	2	2	7
(Papua New Guinea) 2016	Quarter-finals	4	1	1	2	13	8
(France) 2018	Group Stage	3	0	1	2	4	6
(Costa Rica) 2022	Third place	6	4	1	1	13	3
(Colombia) 2024	Quarter-finals	5	4	0	1	17	2
(Poland) 2026	Quarter-finals	5	3	1	1	10	4
Total	12/12	54	25	13	16	109	64

=== CONMEBOL Sub 20 Femenina ===
Year	Result	GP	W	D*	L	GF	GA
(Brazil) 2004	Champions	3	3	0	0	16	4
(Chile) 2006	Champions	7	6	1	0	37	2
(Brazil) 2008	Champions	7	7	0	0	30	0
(Colombia) 2010	Champions	6	6	0	0	25	3
(Brazil) 2012	Champions	7	7	0	0	27	1
(Uruguay) 2014	Champions	7	6	1	0	24	3
(Brazil) 2015	Champions	7	4	3	0	12	4
(Ecuador) 2018	Champions	7	7	0	0	30	1
(Chile) 2022	Champions	7	7	0	0	22	0
(Ecuador) 2024	Champions	9	8	0	1	20	4
(Paraguay) 2026	Champions	9	7	1	1	20	4
Total	11/11	76	68	6	2	259	28

== See also ==
- Brazil women's national football team
- Brazil women's national under-17 football team

== Head-to-head record ==
The following table shows Brazil's head-to-head record in the FIFA U-20 Women's World Cup.

Opponent	Pld	W	D	L	GF	GA	GD	Win %
Australia	3	3	0	0	8	3	+5	100.00
Cameroon	1	1	0	0	3	1	+2	100.00
Canada	3	2	1	0	6	1	+5	66.67
China	3	1	1	1	3	4	−1	33.33
Colombia	1	1	0	0	1	0	+1	100.00
Costa Rica	1	1	0	0	5	0	+5	100.00
England	2	1	1	0	3	2	+1	50.00
Fiji	1	1	0	0	9	0	+9	100.00
France	2	2	0	0	7	0	+7	100.00
Germany	4	1	1	2	5	9	−4	25.00
Italy	2	1	1	0	3	2	+1	50.00
Japan	2	0	0	2	2	5	−3	0.00
Mexico	3	2	0	1	12	6	+6	66.67
Netherlands	1	1	0	0	4	1	+3	100.00
New Zealand	2	1	1	0	4	1	+3	50.00
Nigeria	3	1	1	1	5	5	+0	33.33
North Korea	6	1	0	5	6	11	−5	16.67
Norway	1	1	0	0	3	0	+3	100.00
Papua New Guinea	1	1	0	0	9	0	+9	100.00
Russia	2	1	1	0	4	2	+2	50.00
South Korea	1	0	0	1	0	2	−2	0.00
Spain	2	0	1	1	0	1	−1	0.00
Sweden	2	0	2	0	2	2	+0	0.00
Tanzania	1	1	0	0	4	1	+3	100.00
United States	4	0	2	2	1	5	−4	0.00
Total	54	25	13	16	109	64	+45	46.30
