= Botafogo FR (women) =

Brazilian football club

Botafogo
- Full name: Botafogo de Futebol e Regatas
- Nicknames: Fogão (The Great Fire); A Estrela Solitária (The Lone Star); O Glorioso (The Glorious One)
- Ground: Estádio Nilton Santos
- Capacity: 46,831
- SAF Owner: Eagle Football Holdings (90%)
- President: João Paulo Magalhães Lins
- Head coach: Léo Goulart
- League: Campeonato Brasileiro Série A1; Campeonato Carioca
- 2025 2025: Série A2, 2nd of 16 (promoted); Carioca, 3rd of 8
- Website: https://www.botafogo.com.br/futebol-feminino.php
Home colours	Away colours

Botafogo de Futebol e Regatas, commonly known as Botafogo, is a professional women's association football club based in Rio de Janeiro, Brazil. Founded in 1995, the team is affiliated with FFERJ and play their home games at Estádio Nilton Santos. The team colors, reflected in their logo and uniform, are white and black. They play in the top tier of women's football in Brazil, the Campeonato Brasileiro de Futebol Feminino, and in the Campeonato Carioca de Futebol Feminino, the first division of the traditional in-state competition.

== Current squad ==
As of 12 April 2026.

Note: Flags indicate national team as defined under FIFA eligibility rules; some limited exceptions apply. Players may hold more than one non-FIFA nationality.

No.	Pos.	Nation	Player
1	GK	BRA	Yasmim
2	DF	BRA	Sinara
3	DF	BRA	Yasmin Cosmann (on loan from São Paulo)
4	DF	BRA	Thaynara
6	DF	BRA	Fran Bonfanti
7	FW	BRA	Ana Caroline
8	MF	BRA	Vitorinha
9	FW	BRA	Tipa
10	MF	BRA	Bebê
11	FW	BRA	Dandara
12	GK	BRA	Michelle
13	DF	BRA	Thaiane Camurça
14	DF	BRA	Letícia Debiasi (on loan from Internacional)
15	MF	BRA	Paty Alves
16	DF	BRA	Natane Locatelli
17	MF	BRA	Nayara

No.	Pos.	Nation	Player
18	FW	BRA	Shashá
19	MF	BRA	Cabral
20	FW	BRA	Rebeca
21	DF	BRA	Kaila Gomes
22	DF	BRA	Paola Kichler
23	GK	BRA	Lara Silva
24	FW	BRA	Tailane
25	MF	BRA	Kika Brandino
26	DF	BRA	Sassá
27	MF	BRA	Tauane Zóio
28	MF	BRA	Rita Bove
29	FW	BRA	Júlia Moreira
30	GK	BRA	Isadora Ramires
32	FW	BRA	Ellen (on loan from Corinthians)
—	MF	BRA	Kewllen

== Honours ==
=== Official tournaments ===
State
Competitions	Titles	Seasons
Campeonato Carioca	3	2014, 2020, 2022
Copa Rio	1	2024

=== Youth team ===
- Campeonato Brasileiro Feminino Sub-20 (1): 2025
- Campeonato Carioca Sub-20 (2): 2022, 2023
- Copa Rio Sub-20 (1): 2023

== See also ==
- Botafogo de Futebol e Regatas
- Botafogo de Futebol e Regatas (basketball)
