= 2025 Campeonato Brasileiro de Futebol Feminino Série A2 =

Campeonato Brasileiro de Futebol Feminino Série A2
- Season: 2025
- Dates: 19 April – 30 August 2025
- Champions: Santos (1st title)
- Promoted: Atlético Mineiro; Botafogo; Mixto; Santos; Vitória
- Relegated: Remo; São José
- Matches: 70
- Goals: 204 (2.91 per match)

The 2025 Campeonato Brasileiro Feminino A2 was the ninth season of the Campeonato Brasileiro de Futebol Feminino Série A2, the second division of women's football in Brazil since its establishment in 2017. The tournament was organized by the Brazilian Football Confederation (CBF). It started on 19 April and ended on 30 August 2025.

Sixteen teams competed in the league – the eight teams from the previous season, as well as four teams relegated from the 2024 Série A1 (Botafogo, Santos, Avaí and Atlético Mineiro) and four teams promoted from the 2024 Série A3 (Vasco da Gama, Paysandu, Vitória and Ação). On 21 March 2025, after Athletico Paranaense closed their women's football department, Rio Negro-RR were also promoted to the second division.

== Format ==
In the group stage, teams were divided into two groups of eight organized regionally. Each team played once against the other seven teams, with the top four teams qualifying for the knockout rounds, and the two last-placed teams of each group being relegated to the 2026 Série A3. Quarter-finals, semi-finals and finals were played on a home-and-away two-legged basis, with the top four teams (teams qualified to the semifinals) being promoted to the 2026 Série A1.

== Teams ==
Location of teams in 2025 Série A2.

Pos.	Relegated from 2024 Série A1
13	Botafogo
14	Santos
15	Avaí
16	Atlético Mineiro

Pos.	Promoted from 2024 Série A3
1	Vasco da Gama
2	Paysandu
3	Vitória
4	Ação
5	Rio Negro-RR

=== Number of teams by state ===
Number of teams	State	Team(s)
3	São Paulo	Santos, São José and Taubaté
2	Mato Grosso	Ação and Mixto
2	Pará	Paysandu and Remo
2	Rio de Janeiro	Botafogo and Vasco da Gama
1	Amazonas	Itacoatiara
1	Bahia	Vitória
1	Ceará	Fortaleza
1	Distrito Federal	Minas Brasília
1	Minas Gerais	Atlético Mineiro
1	Roraima	Rio Negro
1	Santa Catarina	Avaí

== Stadiums and locations ==
Team	Location	Stadium	Capacity
(Mato Grosso) Ação	Santo Antônio de Leverger	Dutrinha (Cuiabá)	9,000
(Minas Gerais) Atlético Mineiro	Belo Horizonte	Arena Gregorão (Contagem)	4,000
(Santa Catarina (state)) Avaí	Florianópolis	Salézio Kindermann (Caçador)	4,400
(Rio de Janeiro (state)) Botafogo	Rio de Janeiro	Nilton Santos	44,000
(Ceará) Fortaleza	Fortaleza	CT Ribamar Bezerra	1,000
(Amazonas (Brazilian state)) Itacoatiara	Itacoatiara	Floro de Mendonça	5,000
(Federal District (Brazil)) Minas Brasília	Brasília	Bezerrão	20,310
(Mato Grosso) Mixto	Cuiabá	Dutrinha	9,000
(Pará) Paysandu	Belém	Curuzu	16,200
(Pará) Remo	Belém	Baenão	13,792
(Roraima) Rio Negro	Boa Vista	Canarinho	4,556
(São Paulo (state)) Santos	Santos	Vila Belmiro	16,068
(São Paulo (state)) São José	São José dos Campos	Martins Pereira	12,234
(São Paulo (state)) Taubaté	Taubaté	Joaquinzão	9,600
(Rio de Janeiro (state)) Vasco da Gama	Rio de Janeiro	Nivaldo Pereira (Nova Iguaçu)	1,000
(Bahia) Vitória	Salvador	Barradão	34,535

== Group stage ==
In the group stage, each team played on a single round-robin tournament, playing seven matches against all teams of their group. The top four teams of each group advanced to the quarter-finals of the knockout stages. The teams were ranked according to points (3 points for a win, 1 point for a draw, and 0 points for a loss). If tied on points, the following criteria would be used to determine the ranking: 1. Wins; 2. Goal difference; 3. Goals scored; 4. Fewest red cards; 5. Fewest yellow cards; 6. Draw in the headquarters of the Brazilian Football Confederation (Regulations Article 16).

=== Group A ===
Pos	Team	Pld	W	D	L	GF	GA	GD	Pts	Qualification or relegation	SAN	BOT	ATL	MIN	TAU	VAS	AVA	SJO
1	(São Paulo (state)) Santos	7	6	1	0	17	2	+15	19	Advance to the quarter-finals		3–1	1–0	1–1		2–0		
2	(Rio de Janeiro (state)) Botafogo	7	5	1	1	13	5	+8	16	Advance to the quarter-finals				4–0	2–0		2–1	2–0
3	(Minas Gerais) Atlético Mineiro	7	3	2	2	15	4	+11	11	Advance to the quarter-finals		1–1			0–1	1–1	3–0	
4	(Federal District (Brazil)) Minas Brasília	7	3	2	2	8	10	−2	11	Advance to the quarter-finals			0–3		1–1	2–0		
5	(São Paulo (state)) Taubaté	7	3	1	3	8	9	−1	10		0–4						2–0	4–1
6	(Rio de Janeiro (state)) Vasco da Gama	7	2	1	4	10	9	+1	7			0–1			1–0			7–0
7	(Santa Catarina (state)) Avaí	7	2	0	5	11	12	−1	6		0–2			1–2		3–1		6–0
8	(São Paulo (state)) São José (R)	7	0	0	7	1	32	−31	0	Relegation to 2026 Série A3	0–4		0–7	0–2				

Source: CBF
Legend: Blue = home team win; Yellow = draw; Red = away team win.
Rules for classification: 1) points; 2) wins; 3) goal difference; 4) goals scored; 5) head-to-head results (only between 2 teams); 6) fewest red cards; 7) fewest yellow cards; 8) draw.
(R) Relegated

=== Group B ===
Pos	Team	Pld	W	D	L	GF	GA	GD	Pts	Qualification or relegation	FOR	VIT	MIX	ACA	ITA	PAY	RNE	REM
1	(Ceará) Fortaleza	7	4	3	0	20	4	+16	15	Advance to the quarter-finals		0–0		2–0	3–0		8–1	
2	(Bahia) Vitória	7	4	2	1	11	6	+5	14	Advance to the quarter-finals				1–2		2–1		2–0
3	(Mato Grosso) Mixto	7	3	4	0	15	8	+7	13	Advance to the quarter-finals	1–1	1–1		1–0	4–0			
4	(Mato Grosso) Ação	7	3	2	2	11	7	+4	11	Advance to the quarter-finals					3–3	5–0		1–0
5	(Amazonas (Brazilian state)) Itacoatiara	7	2	2	3	10	16	−6	8			1–2				1–1	1–0	4–3
6	(Pará) Paysandu	7	1	3	3	7	14	−7	6		1–1		2–2				1–3	
7	(Roraima) Rio Negro	7	1	3	3	9	17	−8	6			1–3	3–3	0–0				
8	(Pará) Remo (R)	7	0	1	6	6	17	−11	1	Relegation to 2026 Série A3	1–5		1–3			0–1	1–1	

Source: CBF
Legend: Blue = home team win; Yellow = draw; Red = away team win.
Rules for classification: 1) points; 2) wins; 3) goal difference; 4) goals scored; 5) head-to-head results (only between 2 teams); 6) fewest red cards; 7) fewest yellow cards; 8) draw.
(R) Relegated

=== Quarter-finals ===
Team 1	Agg.	Team 2	1st leg	2nd leg
Ação (Mato Grosso)	1–3	(São Paulo (state)) Santos	0–1	1–2
Atlético Mineiro (Minas Gerais)	1–1 (9–8 p)	(Bahia) Vitória	1–0	0–1
Minas Brasília (Federal District (Brazil))	1–2	(Ceará) Fortaleza	1–2	0–0
Mixto (Mato Grosso)	3–7	(Rio de Janeiro (state)) Botafogo	1–2	2–5

=== Semi-finals ===
Pos	Team	Pld	W	D	L	GF	GA	GD	Pts	Host
1	(São Paulo (state)) Santos	9	8	1	0	20	3	+17	25	Second leg
4	(Minas Gerais) Atlético Mineiro	9	4	2	3	16	5	+11	14	First leg
2	(Rio de Janeiro (state)) Botafogo	9	7	1	1	20	8	+12	22	Second leg
3	(Ceará) Fortaleza	9	5	4	0	22	5	+17	19	First leg

Source: CBF

Team 1	Agg.	Team 2	1st leg	2nd leg
Atlético Mineiro (Minas Gerais)	2–2 (4–5 p)	(São Paulo (state)) Santos	1–0	1–2
Fortaleza (Ceará)	3–3 (3–5 p)	(Rio de Janeiro (state)) Botafogo	2–2	1–1

=== Finals ===
Team 1	Agg.	Team 2	1st leg	2nd leg
Botafogo (Rio de Janeiro (state))	1–2	(São Paulo (state)) Santos	0–1	1–1
