= Campeonato Brasileiro de Futebol Feminino Série A2 =

Brazilian women's football tournament

- Founded: 2017
- Country: Brazil
- Confederation: CBF
- Number of clubs: 16
- Level on pyramid: 2
- Promotion to: Campeonato Brasileiro de Futebol Feminino Série A1
- Relegation to: Campeonato Brasileiro de Futebol Feminino Série A3
- Domestic cup: Supercopa Feminina
- Current champions: Santos (1st title) (2025)
- Most championships: Red Bull Bragantino (2 titles)
- Broadcaster(s): Band; Mycujoo; Twitter
- Website: cbf.com.br/competicoes/brasileiro-feminino-a2
- Current: 2025 edition

The Campeonato Brasileiro de Futebol Feminino Série A2 (Brazilian Women's National Championship Second Level) is an annual Brazilian women's club football tournament organized by the CBF.

The semi-finalists are promoted to Campeonato Brasileiro de Futebol Feminino Série A1. The distribution of participating teams will be by the CBF Women's Football Ranking and from 2018 onwards, it will be by state representatives who will dispute a preliminary phase to define the participants.

== Distribution ==
=== In 2017 ===
1. The top 16 in the CBF Women's Football Ranking who are not already in the Campeonato Brasileiro de Futebol Feminino Série A1.
- 16 Associations.

=== In 2018 ===
1. The two teams relegated of the Campeonato Brasileiro de Futebol Feminino Série A1 last year;
2. The first state of the RNF (National Ranking of Federations) has the right to a representative;
3. The other states have one representative each in the preliminary phase.
- 29 Associations.

=== In 2019 ===
1. The two teams relegated of the Campeonato Brasileiro de Futebol Feminino Série A1 last year;
2. One representative from each of the 27 states;
3. The top 7 in the CBF Ranking (Male) that are not already in the Campeonato Brasileiro de Futebol Feminino Série A1.
- 36 Associations.

=== In 2020 ===
1. The four teams relegated of the Campeonato Brasileiro de Futebol Feminino Série A1 last year;
2. One representative from each of the 27 states;
3. The top 5 in the CBF Ranking (Male) that are not already in the Campeonato Brasileiro de Futebol Feminino Série A1
- 36 Associations.

=== In 2021 ===
1. The four teams relegated of the Campeonato Brasileiro de Futebol Feminino Série A1 last year;
2. One representative from each of the 27 states;
3. The top 5 in the CBF Ranking (Male) that are not already in the Campeonato Brasileiro de Futebol Feminino Série A1
- 36 Associations.

=== In 2022 ===
1. The four teams relegated from the previous year's Campeonato Brasileiro de Futebol Feminino Série A1;
2. The remaining 12 of the Campeonato Brasileiro de Futebol Feminino Série A2
- 16 Associations.

== List of Champions ==
Below is a list of all Campeonato Brasileiro Série A2 champions:

Year	Winner	Runner-up
2017	(Pará) Pinheirense	(São Paulo (state)) Portuguesa
2018	(Federal District (Brazil)) Minas Brasília	(Bahia) Vitória
2019	(São Paulo (state)) São Paulo	(Minas Gerais) Cruzeiro
2020	(Santa Catarina (state)) Napoli	(Rio de Janeiro (state)) Botafogo
2021	(São Paulo (state)) Red Bull Bragantino	(Minas Gerais) Atlético Mineiro
2022	Ceará	(Paraná (state)) Athletico Paranaense
2023	(São Paulo (state)) Red Bull Bragantino (2)	(Rio de Janeiro (state)) Fluminense
2024	Bahia	(Amazonas (Brazilian state)) 3B da Amazônia
2025	(São Paulo (state)) Santos	(Rio de Janeiro (state)) Botafogo

== Top Scorers ==
Year	Player (team)	Goals
2017	Irley (Pinheirense); Valéria (Tiradentes-PI)	10
2018	Luana Spindler (3B)	12
2019	Carla Nunes (Palmeiras); Karina Balestra (Grêmio)	14
2020	Evelyn (Bahia)	11
2021	Ariel (Red Bull Bragantino)	11
2022	Michele (Ceará)	7
2023	(Argentina) Paulina Gramaglia (Red Bull Bragantino)	10
2024	Bea (Fortaleza)	10
2025	Laryh (Santos)	8

== Clubs promoted to Série A1 ==
Year	Clubs
2017	Pinheirense, Portuguesa
2018	Minas Brasília, Vitória (BA), Internacional
2019	São Paulo, Cruzeiro, Grêmio, Palmeiras
2020	Napoli, Botafogo, Bahia, Real Brasília
2021	Red Bull Bragantino, Atlético Mineiro, CRESSPOM, ESMAC
2022	Ceará, Athletico Paranaense, Bahia, Real Ariquemes
2023	Red Bull Bragantino, Fluminense, Botafogo, América Mineiro
2024	Bahia, 3B da Amazônia, Juventude, Sport Recife
2025	Santos, Botafogo, Atlético Mineiro, Fortaleza
2026	Vasco da Gama, Minas Brasília

== Clubs relegated to Série A3 ==
Year	Clubs
2022	Vasco da Gama, Iranduba, Cefama, Aliança
2023	Vila Nova (GO), Botafogo (PB), ESMAC, CRESSPOM
2024	UDA, VF4 (PB), Doce Mel, Recanto (AM)
2025	Remo, São José (SP)
2026	UDA, Itacoatiara

== See also ==
- Sport in Brazil
  - Football in Brazil
    - Women's football in Brazil
- Campeonato Brasileiro Série A1
- Campeonato Brasileiro Série A3
- Copa do Brasil de Futebol Feminino
- Copa Libertadores Femenina
