= 2024 Santos FC (women) season =

Santos
2024 season
- President: Marcelo Teixeira
- Head coach: Bruno Silva (until 1 April); Kleiton Lima (2 April – 15 April); Gláucio Carvalho (17 April – 16 September); Caio Couto (from 16 September)
- Stadium: Vila Belmiro
- Campeonato Brasileiro: 15th (relegated)
- Campeonato Paulista: 6th
- Libertadores: Quarterfinals
- Copa Paulista: Winners
- Top goalscorer: League: Carol Baiana (4); All: Ketlen (13)
Home colours	Away colours	Third colours

The 2024 season was Santos FC's 25th season in existence and the club's tenth consecutive season in the top flight of Brazilian football. As well as the Campeonato Brasileiro, the club competes in the Campeonato Paulista and Copa Libertadores.

Santos suffered relegation to the Campeonato Brasileiro Série A2 for the first time in their history, after finishing 15th in the league. After finishing 6th in the Campeonato Paulista, the club qualified to the Copa Paulista, and won the trophy on penalties over Red Bull Bragantino.

== Players ==
=== Squad information ===
As of 5 May 2025

N	Name	Pos.	Nat.	Place of Birth	Date of Birth (Age)	Caps	Goals	Signed from	Date signed	Contract End
Goalkeepers
1	Kelly Chiavaro	GK	(Italy)	Montreal (Canada)	3 July 1996 (aged 28)	12	0	Botafogo	23 February 2024	31 December 2025
12	Karen Hipólito	GK	(Brazil)	São Paulo (São Paulo (state))	25 February 1993 (aged 31)	17	0	Ferroviária	10 January 2024	31 December 2024
34	Michelle	GK	(Brazil)	São Paulo (São Paulo (state))	27 February 2004 (aged 20)	0	0	Youth system	16 May 2022	31 December 2024
—	Stefane	GK	(Brazil)	Rio de Janeiro (Rio de Janeiro (state))	12 May 1999 (aged 25)	–	–	Nova Southeastern Sharks (United States)	2 July 2024	31 December 2025
Defenders
2	Camila Martins	CB	(Brazil)	Recife (Pernambuco)	26 September 1990 (aged 34)	150	10	Shanghai Shengli (China)	11 February 2021	31 December 2024
4	Lívia Mathias	RB	(Brazil)	Santo André (São Paulo (state))	30 January 2003 (aged 21)	14	0	Corinthians	26 January 2024	31 December 2025
5	Fabiana Yantén	LB/CB	(Colombia)	Candelaria	16 May 1999 (aged 25)	6	0	América de Cali (Colombia)	12 August 2024	15 December 2024
6	Day Silva	CB	(Brazil)	Varginha (Minas Gerais)	20 October 1992 (aged 32)	45	4	Flamengo	9 September 2024	31 December 2024
15	Leidiane	RB	(Brazil)	Gravataí (Rio Grande do Sul)	30 August 1993 (aged 31)	26	0	Atlético Mineiro	26 January 2024	31 December 2025
16	Cida	CB	(Brazil)	Surubim (Pernambuco)	11 November 1985 (aged 39)	107	5	Flamengo	25 January 2024	31 December 2024
21	Reina Bonta	CB	(Philippines)	New Haven (United States)	17 April 1999 (aged 25)	29	0	SF Nighthawks (United States)	2 March 2023	31 December 2024
24	Aldana Narváez	CB/DM	(Argentina)	Rosario	22 May 2001 (aged 23)	13	1	Banfield (Argentina)	29 February 2024	31 December 2024
27	Carol Lara	LB/LW	(Brazil)	Conselheiro Lafaiete (Minas Gerais)	13 August 2003 (aged 21)	0	0	Red Bull Bragantino	26 January 2024	31 December 2025
36	Vitória Kaíssa	LB/LW	(Brazil)	Fortaleza (Ceará)	18 March 2001 (aged 23)	11	1	3B da Amazônia	15 May 2024	31 December 2024
40	Rafa Martins	CB/LB	(Brazil)	Santa Luzia (Minas Gerais)	17 July 1999 (aged 25)	7	1	Ljuboten (North Macedonia)	31 July 2024	15 December 2024
—	Janaína	CB	(Brazil)	Fortaleza (Ceará)	2 April 1988 (aged 36)	118	9	Botafogo	29 January 2024	31 December 2024
—	Nicole Charcopa	RB/RW	(Ecuador)	Guayaquil	1 April 2000 (aged 24)	9	1	Independiente del Valle (Ecuador)	28 February 2024	31 December 2024
—	Raissa	RB	(Brazil)	—N/a	26 June 2004 (aged 20)	1	0	Youth system	6 December 2022	31 December 2024
Midfielders
8	Suzane Pires	AM/CM	(Portugal)	São Paulo (São Paulo (state))	17 August 1992 (aged 32)	68	8	Ferroviária	29 January 2024	31 December 2025
14	Ana Carla	AM/CM	(Brazil)	Vitória (Espírito Santo)	25 June 1994 (aged 30)	72	10	Flamengo	4 February 2022	31 December 2024
17	Larissa Vasconcelos	AM/CM	(Brazil)	Abaetetuba (Pará)	2 July 2001 (aged 23)	31	1	Cruzeiro	25 January 2024	31 December 2025
25	Mary Venâncio	CM	(Brazil)	—N/a	25 January 2007 (aged 17)	1	0	Youth system	14 March 2024	29 May 2026
28	Mari Feitosa	AM/RW	(Brazil)	São Paulo (São Paulo (state))	25 September 2006 (aged 18)	2	0	Youth system	14 March 2024	13 September 2025
30	Gabi Leveque	AM	(Brazil)	Goiânia (Goiás)	5 February 2005 (aged 19)	0	0	Youth system	11 April 2024	31 December 2024
32	Nath Pitbull	DM/CB	(Brazil)	Jundiaí (São Paulo (state))	4 June 1995 (aged 29)	22	2	3B da Amazônia	16 May 2024	30 November 2024
33	Laura Valverde	CM	(Brazil)	Angra dos Reis (Rio de Janeiro (state))	2 June 2003 (aged 21)	74	2	Youth system	9 December 2021	30 November 2024
35	Camile Abreu	AM	(Brazil)	Piracicaba (São Paulo (state))	23 March 2007 (aged 17)	0	0	Youth system	19 April 2024	31 December 2025
37	Karla Alves	DM	(Brazil)	Curitiba (Paraná (state))	23 November 1999 (aged 25)	25	4	3B da Amazônia	19 April 2024	31 December 2024
38	Júlia	DM	(Brazil)	Encantado (Rio Grande do Sul)	24 November 2001 (aged 23)	56	8	Internacional	13 April 2021	31 December 2024
Forwards
7	Ketlen	RW/LW	(Brazil)	Rio Fortuna (Santa Catarina (state))	7 January 1992 (aged 32)	363	206	Boston Breakers (United States)	20 January 2021	31 December 2025
9	Sole Jaimes	ST	(Argentina)	Nogoyá	20 January 1989 (aged 35)	73	47	Flamengo	5 June 2024	31 December 2025
10	Thaisinha	RW/AM	(Brazil)	São Paulo (São Paulo (state))	20 January 1993 (aged 31)	186	78	HS Red Angels (South Korea)	21 January 2022	31 December 2024
11	Yamila Rodríguez	LW	(Argentina)	Posadas	24 January 1998 (aged 26)	3	0	Palmeiras	11 September 2024	31 December 2024
19	Carol Baiana	ST/RW	(Brazil)	Petrolina (Pernambuco)	28 October 1994 (aged 30)	25	7	Cruzeiro	26 January 2024	31 December 2024
22	Mili Menéndez	ST	(Argentina)	Mar del Plata	23 March 1997 (aged 27)	14	1	Racing (Argentina)	28 February 2024	31 December 2024
26	Paola	LW	(Brazil)	Bauru (São Paulo (state))	23 May 2003 (aged 21)	22	7	Atlético Mineiro	5 February 2024	31 December 2024
29	Isa Viana	ST	(Brazil)	Barueri (São Paulo (state))	20 April 2005 (aged 19)	1	0	Youth system	25 February 2023	31 December 2024
34	Samara	RW/AM	(Brazil)	—N/a	4 October 2006 (aged 18)	1	0	Youth system	13 August 2024	31 December 2025
99	Nathane	ST	(Brazil)	São Mateus (Espírito Santo)	8 August 1990 (aged 34)	5	0	Botafogo	10 September 2024	31 December 2025

Source: SantosFC.com.br (for appearances and goals), FPF (for contracts).

=== Appearances and goals ===
No.	Pos.	Nat	Name	Brasileirão		Paulistão		Libertadores		Copa Paulista		Total	
No.	Pos.	Nat	Name	Apps	Goals	Apps	Goals	Apps	Goals	Apps	Goals	Apps	Goals
12	GK	(Brazil)	Karen Hipólito	6	0	3	0	4	0	4	0	17	0
1	GK	(Italy)	Kelly Chiavaro	3	0	7+1	0	0+1	0	0	0	12	0
23	GK	(Philippines)	Olivia McDaniel	6	0	0	0	0	0	0	0	6	0
24	DF	(Argentina)	Aldana Narváez	6+2	1	5	0	0	0	0	0	13	1
2	DF	(Brazil)	Camila Martins	10+2	1	5+1	1	4	0	3	0	25	2
16	DF	(Brazil)	Cida	3+4	0	6+1	0	0	0	0+4	0	18	0
3	DF	(Brazil)	Dani Silva	11+2	1	3+3	0	0	0	0	0	19	1
6	DF	(Brazil)	Day Silva	0	0	0	0	4	1	3	1	7	2
5	DF	(Colombia)	Fabiana Yantén	0+1	0	1+2	0	0+1	0	0	0	5	0
–	DF	(Brazil)	Janaína	14	1	1+2	0	0	0	0	0	17	1
13	DF	(Brazil)	Kelly	0	0	1+1	0	0	0	0	0	2	0
15	DF	(Brazil)	Leidiane	5+4	0	7+2	0	4	0	4	0	26	0
4	DF	(Brazil)	Lívia Mathias	7+2	0	3+1	0	0	0	0+1	0	14	0
–	DF	(Ecuador)	Nicole Charcopa	0+6	0	1+2	1	0	0	0	0	9	1
40	DF	(Brazil)	Rafa Martins	0	0	0	0	1+2	1	4	0	7	1
21	DF	(Philippines)	Reina Bonta	3+1	0	1	0	0	0	0	0	5	0
36	DF	(Brazil)	Vitória Kaíssa	1+2	0	4+4	1	0	0	0	0	11	1
14	MF	(Brazil)	Ana Carla	0+3	0	6+3	3	0+3	0	1+3	1	19	4
20	MF	(Brazil)	Erikinha	0+1	0	4+3	1	0	0	0	0	8	1
18	MF	(Nicaragua)	Hannah Lee	0+2	0	1	0	0	0	0	0	3	0
38	MF	(Brazil)	Júlia Daltoé	0	0	0+2	0	0+1	0	0+2	0	5	0
37	MF	(Brazil)	Karla Alves	8+1	2	5+2	2	4	0	4	0	24	4
17	MF	(Brazil)	Larissa Vasconcelos	11+3	0	6+3	0	4	0	4	1	31	1
33	MF	(Brazil)	Laura Valverde	1+5	0	4+6	0	0+3	0	0+4	0	23	1
28	MF	(Brazil)	Mari Feitosa	0+2	0	0	0	0	0	0	0	2	0
5	MF	(Brazil)	Maria Alves	9+1	0	5+1	1	0	0	0	0	16	1
25	MF	(Brazil)	Mary Venâncio	1	0	0	0	0	0	0	0	1	0
32	MF	(Brazil)	Nath Pitbull	5	0	5+5	2	3	0	4	0	22	2
8	MF	(Portugal)	Suzane Pires	15	0	5+4	1	4	1	1	0	29	2
19	FW	(Brazil)	Carol Baiana	8+6	4	2+1	1	4	1	4	1	25	7
7	FW	(Brazil)	Ketlen	13	2	5+4	7	4	4	3	1	29	14
22	FW	(Argentina)	Mili Menéndez	3+7	1	2+3	0	0	0	0	0	15	1
99	FW	(Brazil)	Nathane	0	0	0	0	0+3	0	0+2	0	5	0
26	FW	(Brazil)	Paola	0+8	1	5+3	4	0+3	0	2+1	2	22	7
34	FW	(Brazil)	Samara	0	0	1	0	0	0	0	0	1	0
9	FW	(Argentina)	Sole Jaimes	4+1	1	2+5	1	0	0	0+3	0	15	2
10	FW	(Brazil)	Thaisinha	11+1	0	4+1	0	4	1	3	1	24	2
11	FW	(Argentina)	Yamila Rodríguez	0	0	0	0	0+3	0	0	0	3	0

Last updated: 5 May 2025
Source: Match reports in Competitive matches, Soccerway

=== Goalscorers ===
Ran	No.	Pos	Nat	Name	Brasileirão	Paulistão	Libertadores	Copa Paulista	Total
1	7	FW	(Brazil)	Ketlen	2	7	4	1	14
2	19	FW	(Brazil)	Carol Baiana	4	1	1	1	7
2	26	FW	(Brazil)	Paola	1	4	0	2	7
3	14	MF	(Brazil)	Ana Carla	0	3	0	1	4
3	37	MF	(Brazil)	Karla Alves	2	2	0	0	4
4	2	DF	(Brazil)	Camila Martins	1	1	0	0	2
4	6	DF	(Brazil)	Day Silva	0	0	1	1	2
4	32	MF	(Brazil)	Nath Pitbull	0	2	0	0	2
4	9	FW	(Argentina)	Sole Jaimes	1	1	0	0	2
4	8	MF	(Portugal)	Suzane Pires	0	1	1	0	2
4	10	FW	(Brazil)	Thaisinha	0	0	1	1	2
6	24	DF	(Argentina)	Aldana Narváez	1	0	0	0	1
6	3	DF	(Brazil)	Dani Silva	1	0	0	0	1
6	20	MF	(Brazil)	Erikinha	0	1	0	0	1
6	—	DF	(Brazil)	Janaína	1	0	0	0	1
6	5	MF	(Brazil)	Maria Alves	0	1	0	0	1
6	17	MF	(Brazil)	Larissa Vasconcelos	0	1	0	0	1
6	33	MF	(Brazil)	Laura Valverde	0	0	0	1	1
6	22	FW	(Argentina)	Mili Menéndez	1	0	0	0	1
6	—	DF	(Ecuador)	Nicole Charcopa	0	1	0	0	1
6	40	DF	(Brazil)	Rafa Martins	0	0	1	0	1
6	36	DF	(Brazil)	Vitória Kaíssa	0	1	0	0	1
Own goals					0	0	1	0	1
Total					15	26	10	9	60

Last updated: 5 May 2025
Source: Match reports in Competitive matches, Soccerway

=== Disciplinary record ===
N	Nat	Pos	Name	Brasileirão			Paulistão			Libertadores			Copa Paulista			Total		
N	Nat	Pos	Name	Yellow card	(yellow card) (yellow-red card)	Red card	Yellow card	(yellow card) (yellow-red card)	Red card	Yellow card	(yellow card) (yellow-red card)	Red card	Yellow card	(yellow card) (yellow-red card)	Red card	Yellow card	(yellow card) (yellow-red card)	Red card
2	(Brazil)	DF	Camila Martins	3	0	1	2	0	0	2	0	0	1	0	0	8	0	1
–	(Brazil)	DF	Janaína	2	0	0	1	1	0	0	0	0	0	0	0	3	1	0
10	(Brazil)	FW	Thaisinha	0	0	1	1	0	0	1	0	0	0	0	0	2	0	1
32	(Brazil)	MF	Nath Pitbull	0	0	0	1	0	0	2	0	0	1	0	0	4	0	0
26	(Brazil)	FW	Paola	1	0	0	2	0	0	1	0	0	0	0	0	4	0	0
20	(Brazil)	MF	Erikinha	0	0	1	1	0	0	0	0	0	0	0	0	1	0	1
15	(Brazil)	DF	Leidiane	1	1	0	0	0	0	0	0	0	0	0	0	1	1	0
24	(Argentina)	DF	Aldana Narváez	2	0	0	1	0	0	0	0	0	0	0	0	3	0	0
19	(Brazil)	FW	Carol Baiana	2	0	0	1	0	0	0	0	0	0	0	0	3	0	0
17	(Brazil)	MF	Larissa Vasconcelos	0	0	0	2	0	0	1	0	0	0	0	0	3	0	0
37	(Brazil)	MF	Karla Alves	0	0	0	1	0	0	1	0	0	0	0	0	2	0	0
33	(Brazil)	MF	Laura Valverde	1	0	0	1	0	0	0	0	0	0	0	0	2	0	0
5	(Brazil)	FW	Maria Alves	1	0	0	1	0	0	0	0	0	0	0	0	2	0	0
8	(Portugal)	MF	Suzane Pires	1	0	0	0	0	0	1	0	0	0	0	0	2	0	0
14	(Brazil)	MF	Ana Carla	0	0	0	0	0	0	1	0	0	0	0	0	1	0	0
3	(Brazil)	DF	Dani Silva	1	0	0	0	0	0	0	0	0	0	0	0	1	0	0
12	(Brazil)	GK	Karen Hipólito	1	0	0	0	0	0	0	0	0	0	0	0	1	0	0
4	(Brazil)	DF	Lívia Mathias	1	0	0	0	0	0	0	0	0	0	0	0	1	0	0
21	(Philippines)	DF	Reina Bonta	1	0	0	0	0	0	0	0	0	0	0	0	1	0	0
34	(Brazil)	MF	Samara	0	0	0	1	0	0	0	0	0	0	0	0	1	0	0
9	(Argentina)	FW	Sole Jaimes	1	0	0	0	0	0	0	0	0	0	0	0	1	0	0
TOTALS				19	1	3	16	1	0	10	0	0	2	0	0	47	2	3

=== Suspensions served ===
Date	Matches Missed	Player	Reason	Opponents Missed	Competition
24 March	1	Camila Martins	(red card) vs América-MG	Bragantino (H)	Campeonato Brasileiro
11 May	1	Leidiane	(yellow card) (yellow-red card) vs Palmeiras	Cruzeiro (H)	Campeonato Brasileiro
17 May	1	Erikinha	(red card) vs Cruzeiro	São Paulo (H)	Campeonato Brasileiro
15 June	1	Thaisinha	(red card) vs Ferroviária	Grêmio (H)	Campeonato Brasileiro
15 June	1	Camila Martins	3x (yellow card)	Grêmio (H)	Campeonato Brasileiro
20 June	1	Janaína	(yellow card) (yellow-red card) vs Palmeiras	São José (H)	Campeonato Paulista
9 October	1	Nath Pitbull	2x (yellow card)	Boca Juniors (N)	Copa Libertadores

Source: Match reports in Competitive matches

== Coaches ==
Name	Nat.	Place of Birth	Date of Birth (Age)	Signed from	Date signed	Role	G	W	D	L	%	Departure	Manner	Contract End
Bruno Silva	(Brazil)	São Paulo (São Paulo (state))	19 March 1987 (age 39)	Youth system	13 September 2023	Permanent	4	1	1	2	25.00	1 April 2024	Sacked	31 December 2024
Kleiton Lima	(Brazil)	Santos (São Paulo (state))	5 May 1974 (age 52)	Free agent	2 April 2024	Permanent	1	0	0	1	0.00	15 April 2024	Suspended	31 December 2024
Wesly Otoni	(Brazil)	São Paulo (São Paulo (state))	—N/a	Staff	15 April 2024	Interim	1	1	0	0	100.00	20 April 2024	Return (Note: Back to assistant role after the match)	—N/a
Gláucio Carvalho	(Brazil)	Rio de Janeiro (Rio de Janeiro (state))	16 January 1968 (age 58)	3B da Amazônia	17 April 2024	Permanent	17	5	2	10	29.41	16 September 2024	Sacked	31 December 2024
Caio Couto	(Brazil)	Rio de Janeiro (Rio de Janeiro (state))	29 January 1976 (age 50)	Portuguesa-RJ (men's)	16 September 2024	Permanent	10	7	1	2	70.00			31 December 2024

== Transfers ==
=== Transfers in ===
N.	Pos.	Name	Age	Moving from	Source
8	MF	(Portugal) Suzane Pires	31	Ferroviária	
12	GK	(Brazil) Karen Hipólito	30	Ferroviária	
1	GK	(Italy) Kelly Chiavaro	27	Botafogo	
19	FW	(Brazil) Carol Baiana	29	Cruzeiro	
17	MF	(Brazil) Larissa Vasconcelos	22	Cruzeiro	
27	FW	(Brazil) Carol Lara	20	Red Bull Bragantino	
11	LB	(Ecuador) Nicole Charcopa	23	Independiente del Valle (Ecuador)	
5	FW	(Brazil) Maria Alves	30	León (Mexico)	
24	DF	(Argentina) Aldana Narváez	22	Banfield (Argentina)	
3	LB	(Brazil) Dani Silva	37	São Paulo	
16	DF	(Brazil) Cida	38	Flamengo	
4	RB	(Brazil) Lívia Mathias	20	Corinthians	
15	RB	(Brazil) Leidiane	30	Atlético Mineiro	
6	DF	(Brazil) Janaína	35	Botafogo	
22	FW	(Argentina) Mili Menéndez	26	Racing Club (Argentina)	
23	GK	(Philippines) Olivia McDaniel	26	Pinzgau Saalfelden (Austria)	
18	MF	(Nicaragua) Hannah Lee	23	Utah Valley Wolverines (United States)	
37	MF	(Brazil) Karla Alves	24	3B da Amazônia	
36	LB	(Brazil) Vitória Kaíssa	23	3B da Amazônia	
32	MF	(Brazil) Nath Pitbull	28	3B da Amazônia	
9	FW	(Argentina) Sole Jaimes	35	Flamengo	
—	GK	(Brazil) Stefane	25	Nova Southeastern Sharks (United States)	
40	CB	(Brazil) Rafa Martins	25	Ljuboten (North Macedonia)	
5	LB	(Colombia) Fabiana Yantén	25	América de Cali (Colombia) (loan)	
6	CB	(Brazil) Day Silva	31	Flamengo (loan)	
99	FW	(Brazil) Nathane	34	Botafogo	
11	FW	(Argentina) Yamila Rodríguez	26	Palmeiras	

=== Transfers out ===
N.	Pos.	Name	Age	Moving to	Source
9	FW	(United States) Jourdan Ziff	26	Whitecaps FC Elite (Canada)	
5	MF	(Brazil) Brena	27	Palmeiras	
42	GK	(Brazil) Jully	24	Cruzeiro	
12	GK	(Brazil) Camila Rodrigues	22	Cruzeiro	
28	RB	(Brazil) Gi Fernandes	19	Corinthians	
23	LB	(Brazil) Bia Menezes	26	São Paulo	
24	GK	(Brazil) Anna Bia	23	São Paulo	
29	FW	(Brazil) Taina Maranhão	19	Palmeiras	
26	MF	(Brazil) Vitória Yaya	21	Corinthians	
20	DF	(Brazil) Kaká	24	São Paulo	
11	FW	(Brazil) Cristiane	38	Flamengo	
77	FW	(Brazil) Fabi Simões	34	Flamengo	
8	FW	(Brazil) Jane	31	Red Bull Bragantino	
2	DF	(Brazil) Tayla	31	Grêmio	
18	MF	(Nicaragua) Hannah Lee	23	Free agent	
23	GK	(Philippines) Olivia McDaniel	26	Stallion Laguna (Philippines)	
20	MF	(Brazil) Erikinha	36	Hapoel Hadera (Israel)	
5	MF	(Brazil) Maria Alves	31	ABB Fomget (Turkey)	
3	DF	(Brazil) Dani Silva	37	Atlético Mineiro (loan)	

== Competitions ==
=== Campeonato Brasileiro ===
==== Results summary ====
Overall								Home						Away					
Pld	W	D	L	GF	GA	GD	Pts	W	D	L	GF	GA	GD	W	D	L	GF	GA	GD
15	3	2	10	15	40	−25	11	1	2	5	6	15	−9	2	0	5	9	25	−16

Source: Soccerway

==== First stage ====
Pos	Team	Pld	W	D	L	GF	GA	GD	Pts	Qualification or relegation
12	Real Brasília	15	4	5	6	11	16	−5	17	
13	Botafogo (R)	15	2	6	7	13	24	−11	12	Relegation to Campeonato Brasileiro Série A2
14	Santos (R)	15	3	2	10	15	40	−25	11	Relegation to Campeonato Brasileiro Série A2
15	Avaí (R)	15	1	4	10	11	35	−24	7	Relegation to Campeonato Brasileiro Série A2
16	Atlético Mineiro (R)	15	0	1	14	11	49	−38	1	Relegation to Campeonato Brasileiro Série A2

Source: CBF
(R) Relegated

===== Matches =====
15 March 1	Santos	1–1	Real Brasília	Santos
19:00 UTC-03:00	Dani Silva 77'	Report	25' Lorena Bedoya; (yellow card) 76' Lady Andrade	Stadium: Vila Belmiro; Referee: Andressa Hartmann

20 March 2	Atlético Mineiro	1–3	Santos	Nova Lima
18:00 UTC-03:00	Anny Marabá 23' (pen.); Karol Alves (yellow card) 49'; Duda Batista (yellow card) 53'; Amália (yellow card) 70'	Report	(yellow card) 22' Karen Hipólito; 50' Narváez; (yellow card) 62' Reina Bonta; 71' Menéndez; 88' Carol Baiana	Stadium: Castor Cifuentes; Referee: Thayslane de Melo Costa

24 March 3	América Mineiro	2–1	Santos	Contagem
15:00 UTC-03:00	Iara (yellow card) 64'; Karol Arcanjo 86' (pen.); Valéria Lima 90+3'	Report	(yellow card) 48' Carol Baiana; 61' (yellow card) 72' Jana; (red card) 90+7' Camila	Stadium: Arena Gregorão; Referee: Jaqueline Blasius

29 March 4	Santos	0–2	Red Bull Bragantino	Santos
19:00 UTC-03:00	Jana (yellow card) 50'; Aldana Narváez (yellow card) 75'	Report	5' Laís; (yellow card) 28' Débora; 79' Catalina Ongaro; (yellow card) 84' Rhayanna	Stadium: Vila Belmiro; Referee: Tainan Bordignon Somensi

12 April 5	Santos	1–3	Corinthians	Santos
21:30 UTC-03:00	Ketlen 14'; Camila Martins (yellow card) 54'	Report	3' Vic Albuquerque; (yellow card) 35' Letícia Santos; (yellow card) 37' Jaqueline; 79', 90+2' Tamires	Stadium: Vila Belmiro; Referee: Andreza Helena da Siqueira

20 April 6	Avaí	1–3	Santos	Caçador
15:00 UTC-03:00	Thaiane (yellow card) 55'; González 68'; Joyce Manfio (yellow card) 90+2'	Report	21' (yellow card) 80' Carol Baiana; 33' Ketlen; (yellow card) 58' Suzane Pires; (yellow card) 64' Lívia Mathias; 89' Camila Martins	Stadium: Salézio Kindermann; Referee: Daniele Bulhosa do Nascimento

29 April 7	Flamengo	7–0	Santos	Rio de Janeiro
15:00 UTC-03:00	Cristiane 8', 32'; Camila Martins 26' (o.g.); Glaucia 64'; Naná 68'; Laysa 75'; Isadora 90+1'	Report		Stadium: Estádio Luso Brasileiro; Attendance: Elizabete Esmeralda Cordeiro dos Santos Gomes

2 May 8	Santos	0–1	Fluminense	Santos
21:00 UTC-03:00	Narváez (yellow card) 41'	Report	(yellow card) 83' Camila Pini; 90' Mileninha	Stadium: Estádio Ulrico Mursa; Referee: Mariana Regina de Paiva Oliveira

5 May 9	Santos	P–P	Grêmio	Santos
15:00 UTC-03:00				Stadium: Vila Belmiro
Note: Postponed due to the 2024 Rio Grande do Sul floods

11 May 10	Palmeiras	6–0	Santos	Jundiaí
15:00 UTC-03:00	Amanda Gutierres 30', 40', 47' (pen.); Brena (yellow card) 33'; Letícia Ferreira 36'; Juliete 38'; Lais Estevam (yellow card) 80'; Taina Maranhão 90'	Report	(yellow card) 63' (yellow-red card) 83' Leidiane	Stadium: Estádio Jayme Cintra; Referee: Rejane Caetano da Silva

17 May 11	Santos	1–3	Cruzeiro	Mogi das Cruzes
19:00 UTC-03:00	Erikinha (red card) 44'; Camila Martins (yellow card) 45+2'; Karla Alves 65'	Report	24', 67' (yellow card) 45+2' Vanessa; 38' (yellow card) 72' Rafa Andrade; (yellow card) 61' Camila Ambrózio; (yellow card) 64' Vitória Calhau; (yellow card) 88' Ana Clara	Stadium: Nogueirão; Referee: Lais Aparecida Zavoiski

8 June 12	Santos	0–4	São Paulo	Santos
21:00 UTC-03:00		Report	13' Aline Milene; 38' Rafa Mineira; 54' Letícia Alves; 72' (yellow card) 89' Serrana	Stadium: Estádio Ulrico Mursa; Referee: Suanny Aires de Sousa

15 June 13	Ferroviária	2–0	Santos	Jaú
17:00 UTC-03:00	Rafa Soares (yellow card) 25'; Duda Santos 37'; Micaelly 63'; Barrinha (yellow card) 68'	Report	(yellow card) 48' Camila Martins; (red card) 86' Thaisinha	Stadium: Zezinho Magalhães; Referee: Daniele Bulhosa do Nascimento

23 June 9	Santos	2–0	Grêmio	Santos
18:00 UTC-03:00	Sole Jaimes 18'; Maria Alves (yellow card) 35'; Carol Baiana 86'; Dani Silva (yellow card) 88'; Erikinha (yellow card) 90'	Report	(yellow card) 17' Cássia; (yellow card) 40' Peña; (yellow card) 44' Ramos; (yellow card) 83' Rafa Levis	Stadium: Vila Belmiro; Referee: Jady Jesus Caldas

18 August 14	Santos	1–1	Botafogo	Santos
11:00 UTC-03:00	Karla Alves 47'; Sole Jaimes (yellow card) 87'	Report	(yellow card) 30' Letícia Debiasi; (yellow card) 89' Vânia; 90+2' Nath Fabem; (yellow card) 90+6' Silvana	Stadium: Vila Belmiro; Referee: Suanny Aires de Sousa

21 August 15	Internacional	6–2	Santos	Porto Alegre
15:00 UTC-03:00	Tamara 30', 87'; Letícia Monteiro 35', 48'; Aquino 53'; Zóio 76' (yellow card) 84'	Report	65' Carol Baiana; (yellow card) 67' (goal) 78' Paola; (yellow card) 68' Laura Valverde	Stadium: SESC Protásio Alves; Referee: Jaqueline Blasius

Source: CBF

=== Campeonato Paulista ===
==== Results summary ====
Overall								Home						Away					
Pld	W	D	L	GF	GA	GD	Pts	W	D	L	GF	GA	GD	W	D	L	GF	GA	GD
10	5	1	4	26	13	+13	16	2	0	3	14	7	+7	3	1	1	12	6	+6

Source: Soccerway

==== First stage ====
Pos	Team	Pld	W	D	L	GF	GA	GD	Pts	Qualification
4	Ferroviária (A)	10	7	0	3	31	11	+20	21	Advanced to the semifinals
5	Red Bull Bragantino (Q)	10	5	2	3	14	6	+8	17	Eliminated; qualified to the Copa Paulista
6	Santos (Q)	10	5	1	4	26	13	+13	16	Eliminated; qualified to the Copa Paulista
7	São José (Q)	10	4	1	5	11	19	−8	13	Eliminated; qualified to the Copa Paulista
8	Taubaté (Q)	10	4	0	6	16	15	+1	12	Eliminated; qualified to the Copa Paulista

Updated to match(es) played on 29 September 2024. Source: ge
(A) Advance to a further round; (Q) Qualified for the phase indicated

===== Matches =====
22 May 1	Pinda	0–3	Santos	Pindamonhangaba
15:00 UTC-03:00		Report	26' Charcopa; 72' Paola; 83' Vitória Kaíssa	Stadium: Estádio Dr. Antônio Pinheiro Júnior; Referee: Fernanda dos Santos Ignacio de Souza

25 May 2	Santos	8–1	Marília	Santos
16:00 UTC-03:00	Karla Alves 12', 36'; Ketlen 45+1', 49', 82', 90+3'; Maria Alves 62'; Erikinha 78'	Report	15' Giovana	Stadium: Vila Belmiro; Referee: Gabriel Henrique Meira Bispo

5 June 3	Corinthians	1–1	Santos	São Paulo
21:00 UTC-03:00	Ju Ferreira 16'; Mariza (yellow card) 48'; Vitória Yaya (yellow card) 69'; Paulinha (yellow card) 90+6'	Report	(yellow card) 2' (goal) 35' Paola; (yellow card) 27' Narváez; (yellow card) 69' Thaisinha; (yellow card) 90+7' Nath Pitbull	Stadium: Parque São Jorge; Referee: Gabriel Henrique Meira Bispo

12 June 4	Santos	0–1	Red Bull Bragantino	Santos
19:00 UTC-03:00		Report	72' (o.g.) Dani Silva; (yellow card) 90+3' Thalya	Stadium: Estádio Ulrico Mursa; Referee: Fagson Junior dos Santos Silva

20 June 5	Palmeiras	1–2	Santos	Jundiaí
17:00 UTC-03:00	Brena (yellow card) 19'; Gaby Santos 74'	Report	28', 76' Carol Baiana; (yellow card) 33' Erikinha; (yellow card) 52' Larissa Vasconcelos; (yellow card) 81' (yellow-red card) 89' Jana	Stadium: Jayme Cintra; Referee: Fernanda dos Santos Ignacio de Souza

29 June 6	Santos	5–1	São José	Santos
16:00 UTC-03:00	Ketlen 31', 46'; Nath Pitbull 43'; Camila Martins 45+2'; Maria Alves (yellow card) 60'; Laura Valverde (yellow card) 82'; Sole Jaimes 90+5'	Report	2' Débora; (yellow card) 3' Suyane	Stadium: Vila Belmiro; Referee: Adeli Mara Monteiro

6 July 8	Santos	1–2	Taubaté	Santos
11:00 UTC-03:00	Ana Carla 88'; Camila Martins (yellow card) 90+5'	Report	45+4' Isabela Ribeiro; 69' Larisse	Stadium: Vila Belmiro; Referee: Fernanda dos Santos Ignacio de Souza

14 August 9	Ferroviária	4–1	Santos	Araraquara
16:00 UTC-03:00	Katiuscia 13' (yellow card) 45+6'; Natália 31', 36'; Cris (yellow card) 45+1'; Darlene (yellow card) 57'; Rafa Soares (yellow card) 62'; Raquel Domingues (yellow card) 74'; Nicoly (yellow card) 83'; Lelê 85'	Report	(yellow card) 9' Samara; 32' (yellow card) 42' Paola	Stadium: Fonte Luminosa; Referee: Michel de Camargo

24 September 10	Santos	0–2	São Paulo	Santos
19:00 UTC-03:00	Camila Martins (yellow card) 53'; Carol Baiana (yellow card) 83'; Karla Alves (yellow card) 90+1'	Report	(yellow card) 22' Bia Menezes; (yellow card) 25' Kaká; 46' Dudinha; (yellow card) 65' Rayane; 90+1' (pen.) Larissa	Stadium: Vila Belmiro; Referee: Edina Alves Batista

29 September 11	Realidade Jovem	0–5	Santos	São José do Rio Preto
11:00 UTC-03:00	Bia Moreira (yellow card) 16'	Report	4' Nath Pitbull; 20' Paola; 41' Suzane Pires; 42' Carol Baiana; 57' Ketlen	Stadium: João Mendes Athayde; Referee: Adeli Mara Monteiro

=== Copa Libertadores ===
==== First stage ====
Pos	Team	Pld	W	D	L	GF	GA	GD	Pts	Qualification
1	(Brazil) Santos	3	3	0	0	10	2	+8	9	Quarter-finals
2	(Paraguay) Olimpia	3	2	0	1	7	5	+2	6	Quarter-finals
3	(Chile) Colo-Colo	3	1	0	2	7	3	+4	3	
4	(Bolivia) Always Ready	3	0	0	3	0	14	−14	0	

Source: CONMEBOL

===== Matches =====
3 October 2024 1	Always Ready (Bolivia)	0–5	(Brazil) Santos	Ypané
20:00	Plata (yellow card) 20'	Report	1' Thaisinha; 5' Suzane Pires; (yellow card) 26' Karla Alves; 38' Ketlen; 49' Day Silva; 58' (o.g.) Salvatierra	Stadium: CARFEM Stadium; Referee: Marcelly Zambrano (Ecuador)

6 October 2024 2	Colo-Colo (Chile)	0–1	(Brazil) Santos	Ypané
20:00	Pardal (yellow card) 25'; Acuña (yellow card) 74'; Clavijo (yellow card) 83'	Report	(yellow card) 51' Camila Martins; (yellow card) 55' Nath Pitbull; 60' Ketlen; (yellow card) 63' Suzane Pires; (yellow card) 70' Thaisinha	Stadium: CARFEM Stadium; Referee: Jenny Arias Parga (Colombia)

9 October 2024 3	Santos (Brazil)	4–2	(Paraguay) Olimpia	Asunción
20:00	Nath Pitbull (yellow card) 7'; Carol Baiana 23'; Ketlen 39', 51'; Ana Carla (yellow card) 76'; Rafa Martins 80'; Larissa Vasconcelos (yellow card) 90+1'	Report	9' (yellow card) 58' Arce; 89' Peralta	Stadium: Estadio Arsenio Erico; Referee: Nadia Fuques (Uruguay)

==== Quarterfinals ====
12 October 2024	Santos (Brazil)	0–0 (2–4 p)	(Argentina) Boca Juniors	CARFEM Stadium, Ypané
20:00	Leidiane (yellow card) 86'; Paola (yellow card) 90+3'	Report	(yellow card) 60' Masagli	Referee: Stefani Escobar (Venezuela)
	Penalties
	Karla Alves (penalty scored); Day Silva (penalty missed); Rodríguez (penalty scored); Ana Carla (penalty missed)		(penalty missed) Masagli; (penalty scored) Sasaki; (penalty scored) Flores; (penalty scored) Núñez; (penalty scored) Cruz

=== Copa Paulista ===
==== Semifinals ====
26 October First leg	São José	0–1	Santos	Martins Pereira, São José dos Campos
15:00	Hericka Sorriso (yellow card) 39'; Suyane (yellow card) 45'	Report	5' (yellow card) 70' Larissa Vasconcelos	Referee: Marianna Nanni Batalha

31 October Second leg	Santos	4–0	São José	Bruno José Daniel, Santo André
19:30	Day Silva 14'; Paola 65', 68'; Ana Carla 85'	Report	(yellow card) 33' Sarah; (yellow card) 48' Leticia Albuquerque	Referee: Adeli Mara Monteiro

==== Finals ====
5 November First leg	Red Bull Bragantino	4–1	Santos	Nabi Abi Chedid, Bragança Paulista
19:00	Thayslane 41', 45+3', 46'; Rhayanna 73'	Report	(yellow card) 30' Camila Martins; 79' Laura Valverde	Referee: Talita Ximenes de Freitas

10 November Second leg	Santos	3–0 (4–3 p)	São José	Vila Belmiro, Santos
10:00	Thaisinha 8'; Carol Baiana 26'; Ketlen 34'; Suzane Pires (yellow card) 48'; Nath Pitbull (yellow card) 57'	Report	(yellow card) 70' Thalya Nobre; (yellow card) 81' Lelê	Referee: Ana Caroline D’eleuterio de Sousa Carvalho
	Penalties
	Thaisinha (penalty scored); Nath Pitbull (penalty scored); Camila Martins (penalty scored); Sole Jaimes (penalty missed); Ana Carla (penalty scored)		(penalty scored) Isa Rangel; (penalty missed) Thayslane; (penalty scored) Stella; (penalty scored) Géssica; (penalty missed) Brenda Pinheiro

== See also ==
- 2024 Santos FC season
