= 2016 Campeonato Paulista de Futebol Feminino =

Campeonato Paulista de Futebol Feminino
- Season: 2016
- Dates: 9 April – 28 August 2016
- Champions: Rio Preto
- Matches: 98
- Goals: 393 (4.01 per match)
- Top goalscorer: (Argentina) Sole Jaimes (16 goals)

The Paulista Football Championship of 2016 was the 18th edition of this championship women's football organized by the Paulista Football Federation (FPF). Played between April and August, the competition had fourteen participants.

== Format ==
The 2016 Campeonato Paulista de Futebol Feminino was held in four stages:

In the first, the fourteen were divided into 2 groups of 7 teams, facing each other home and away, with the four best in each group qualifying to the quarterfinals. The quarterfinals, semifinals and the final were played in home and away eliminatory games.

== Teams ==
| Team | City | 2015 result |
|---|---|---|
| Centro Olímpico | São Paulo | First stage |
| Corinthians | São Paulo | – |
| Ferroviaria | Araraquara | Second stage |
| Francana | Franca | First stage |
| Guarani | Campinas | First stage |
| Independente | Limeira | – |
| Juventus | São Paulo | – |
| Rio Preto | São José do Rio Preto | Second stage |
| Portuguesa | São Paulo | First stage |
| Santos | Santos | Semifinal |
| São José | São José dos Campos | 1st |
| Taubaté | Taubaté | Second stage |
| União Mogi | Mogi das Cruzes | – |
| XV de Piracicaba | Piracicaba | Second stage |

Source: "Regulamento específico do campeonato paulista de futebol feminino primeira divisão - 2016" (PDF). futebolpaulista.com.br. Federação Paulista de Futebol. 18 March 2016.

== First stage ==
=== Group 1 ===
| Pos | Team | Pld | W | D | L | GF | GA | GD | Pts | Qualification |
|---|---|---|---|---|---|---|---|---|---|---|
| 1 | Rio Preto | 12 | 10 | 1 | 1 | 47 | 10 | +37 | 31 | Advanced to Second stage |
| 2 | Corinthians | 12 | 8 | 2 | 2 | 41 | 10 | +31 | 26 | Advanced to Second stage |
| 3 | XV de Piracicaba | 12 | 5 | 6 | 1 | 32 | 14 | +18 | 21 | Advanced to Second stage |
| 4 | Ferroviaria | 12 | 5 | 3 | 4 | 25 | 13 | +12 | 18 | Advanced to Second stage |
| 5 | Francana | 12 | 4 | 2 | 6 | 22 | 18 | +4 | 14 | |
| 6 | Guarani | 12 | 2 | 2 | 8 | 19 | 29 | −10 | 8 | |
| 7 | Independente | 12 | 0 | 0 | 12 | 0 | 92 | −92 | 0 | |

Updated to match(es) played on 3 July 2016. Source: FPF
Rules for classification: 1) points; 2) wins; 3) goal difference; 4) goals scored; 5) head-to-head results (only between 2 teams); 6) fewest red cards; 7) fewest yellow cards; 8) draw.

=== Group 2 ===
| Pos | Team | Pld | W | D | L | GF | GA | GD | Pts | Qualification |
|---|---|---|---|---|---|---|---|---|---|---|
| 1 | Santos | 12 | 9 | 2 | 1 | 47 | 6 | +41 | 29 | Advanced to Second stage |
| 2 | Centro Olímpico | 12 | 8 | 2 | 2 | 37 | 7 | +30 | 26 | Advanced to Second stage |
| 3 | São José | 12 | 7 | 4 | 1 | 25 | 6 | +19 | 25 | Advanced to Second stage |
| 4 | Portuguesa | 12 | 4 | 3 | 5 | 22 | 16 | +6 | 15 | Advanced to Second stage |
| 5 | Taubaté | 12 | 3 | 5 | 4 | 20 | 18 | +2 | 14 | |
| 6 | Juventus | 12 | 2 | 2 | 8 | 17 | 22 | −5 | 8 | |
| 7 | União Mogi | 12 | 0 | 0 | 12 | 0 | 93 | −93 | −2 | |

Updated to match(es) played on 3 July 2016. Source: FPF
Rules for classification: 1) points; 2) wins; 3) goal difference; 4) goals scored; 5) head-to-head results (only between 2 teams); 6) fewest red cards; 7) fewest yellow cards; 8) draw.

== Bracket ==
Quarterfinals
Rio Preto | 3 | 3 | 6
Portuguesa | 1 | 0 | 1
Centro Olímpico | 1 | 1 | 2
XV de Piracicaba | 2 | 0 | 2
Santos | 2 | 4 | 6
Ferroviaria | 1 | 1 | 2
Corinthians | 3 | 3 | 6
São José | 2 | 1 | 3

Semi-finals
Rio Preto | 2 | 1 | 3
Centro Olímpico | 1 | 0 | 1
Santos | 1 | 2 | 3
Corinthians | 1 | 2 | 3

Finals
Rio Preto | 0 | 1 | 1
Santos | 0 | 0 | 0

== Quarterfinals ==
| Team 1 | Agg. | Team 2 | 1st leg | 2nd leg |
|---|---|---|---|---|
| Rio Preto | 6 - 1 | Portuguesa | 1-3 | 3-0 |
| Centro Olímpico | 2 - 2 | XV de Piracicaba | 2-1 | 1-0 |
| Corinthians | 6 - 3 | São José | 2-3 | 3-1 |
| Santos | 6 - 2 | Ferroviaria | 1-2 | 4-1 |

30 July 2016
16:00

| Portuguesa | 1-3 | Rio Preto |
|---|---|---|
| Lucélia 1' | Report | 40', 50' Millene; 74' Adriana |

Canindé, São Paulo
Referee: Regildenia de Holanda Moura
6 August 2016
15:00

| Rio Preto | 3-0 | Portuguesa |
|---|---|---|
| Millene 54', 76'; Suzana 82' | Report |

Anísio Haddad, São José do Rio Preto
Referee: Adeli Mara Monteiro

Rio Preto won 6-1 on aggregate and advanced to the semifinal.

30 July 2016
10:00

| XV de Piracicaba | 2-1 | Centro Olímpico |
|---|---|---|
| Marcela 16', 39' | Report | 12' Ottilia Grassetti |

Barão da Serra Negra, Piracicaba
Referee: Fernanda dos Santos Ignacio de Souza
7 August 2016
15:00

| Centro Olímpico | 1-0 | XV de Piracicaba |
|---|---|---|
| Marjorie Boilesen 73' | Report |

Baetão, São Bernardo do Campo
Referee: Édilar Maria Ferreira

Centro Olímpico advanced to the semifinal due to better campaign.

30 July 2016
16:00

| São José | 2-3 | Corinthians |
|---|---|---|
| Monique Peçanha 19'; Gabi Portilho 35' (pen.) | Report | 47' (pen.) Byanca Brasil; 58', 76' Janaína |

Martins Pereira, São José dos Campos
Referee: Katiucia da Mota Lima
6 August 2016
18:00

| Corinthians | 3-1 | São José |
|---|---|---|
| Grazielle 4'; Adriane 44'; Gabi Nunes 52' | Report | 40' Ludmila |

José Liberatti, Osasco
Referee: Fernanda dos Santos Ignacio de Souza

Corinthians won 6-3 on aggregate and advanced to the semifinal.

31 July 2016
10:00

| Ferroviária | 1-2 | Santos |
|---|---|---|
| Tuani 25' | Report | 42' Carol Arruda; 86' Maria Alves |

Fonte Luminosa, Araraquara
Referee: Adeli Mara Monteiro
7 August 2016
10:00

| Santos | 4-1 | Ferroviária |
|---|---|---|
| Cida 6'; Sole Jaimes 34', 85' (pen.); Danielli 71' | Report | 88' Carol Pretona |

CT Rei Pelé, Santos
Referee: Katiucia da Mota Lima

Santos won 6-2 on aggregate and advanced to the semifinal.

== Semi-finals ==
| Team 1 | Agg. | Team 2 | 1st leg | 2nd leg |
|---|---|---|---|---|
| Rio Preto | 3 - 1 | Centro Olímpico | 1-2 | 1-0 |
| Santos | 3 - 3 | Corinthians | 1-1 | 2-2 |

14 August 2016
15:00

| Centro Olímpico | 1-2 | Rio Preto |
|---|---|---|
| Ottilia Grassetti 16' | Report | 82' (pen.) Siméia; 89' Mônica Bitencourt |

Baetão, São Bernardo do Campo
Referee: Regildenia de Holanda Moura
21 August 2016
15:00

| Rio Preto | 1-0 | Centro Olímpico |
|---|---|---|
| Millene 52' | Report |

Anísio Haddad, São José do Rio Preto
Referee: Fernanda dos Santos Ignacio de Souza

Rio Preto won 3-1 on aggregate and advanced to the final.

13 August 2016
18:00

| Corinthians | 1-1 | Santos |
|---|---|---|
| Byanca Brasil 11' | Report | 43' Erikinha |

José Liberatti, Osasco
Referee: Adeli Mara Monteiro da Silva
21 August 2016
10:00

| Santos | 2-2 | Corinthians |
|---|---|---|
| Suzane Pires 42'; Sole Jaimes 90+4' (pen.) | Report | 13' Gabi Nunes; 89' Renata Costa |

Vila Belmiro, Santos
Referee: Katiucia da Mota Lima

Santos advanced to the final due to better campaign.

== Final ==
| Team 1 | Agg. | Team 2 | 1st leg | 2nd leg |
|---|---|---|---|---|
| Rio Preto | 1 – 0 | Santos | 0–0 | 1-0 |

25 August 2016
15:00

| Santos | 0-0 | Rio Preto |
|---|---|---|
| | Report |

Vila Belmiro, Santos
Referee: Daniel Bernardes Serrano
28 August 2016
10:00

| Rio Preto | 1-0 | Santos |
|---|---|---|
| Suzana 20' | Report |

Anísio Haddad, São José do Rio Preto
Referee: Lucas Canetto Bellote

== Top goalscorers ==
As of 30 August 2016

| Rank | Player | Club | Goals |
|---|---|---|---|
| 1 | (Argentina) Sole Jaimes | Santos | 16 |
| 2 | (Brazil) Ottilia Grassetti | Centro Olímpico | 15 |
| 3 | (Brazil) Adriana | Rio Preto | 13 |
| 4 | (Brazil) Millene | Rio Preto | 11 |
| 5 | (Brazil) Renata Pelegatti | Guarani | 10 |
| 5 | (Brazil) Gabi Portilho | São José | 10 |

Source: Federação Paulista de Futebol
