= 2022 Supercopa do Brasil de Futebol Feminino =

2022 Supercopa Feminina
2022 Supercopa do Brasil de Futebol Feminino

Tournament details
- Dates: 4–13 February
- Teams: 8

Final positions
- Champions: Corinthians (1st title)
- Runners-up: Grêmio

Tournament statistics
- Matches played: 7
- Goals scored: 13 (1.86 per match)
- Top goal scorer(s): Thirteen players (1 goal each)

The 2022 Supercopa do Brasil de Futebol Feminino (officially the Supercopa Feminina Betano 2022 for sponsorship reasons) was the first edition of the Supercopa do Brasil de Futebol Feminino football competition. It was held between 4 and 13 February 2022.

Corinthians defeated Grêmio 1–0 in the final to win their first title.

== Format ==
The teams played a single-elimination tournament. All stages were played on a single-leg basis, with the highest-ranked-federation team in the 2022 Women's State Ranking hosting the leg. If the teams belonged to the same federation the highest-ranked team in the 2022 Women's Club Ranking would host the leg. If tied, the penalty shoot-out would be used to determine the winners.

== Qualified teams ==
The competition was contested by 8 teams. The teams were chosen between the top twelve teams of the 2021 Campeonato Brasileiro de Futebol Feminino Série A1 and the top four teams of the 2021 Campeonato Brasileiro de Futebol Feminino Série A2 choosing only one team for state. If necessary, a state would gain a second berth according to its 2021 Women's State CBF Ranking position. On 6 December 2021, CBF announced the participating teams.

Teams in bold qualified for the competition.

| Position (tournament) | Team | State | Status | Status (2nd berth) |
|---|---|---|---|---|
| Champions (Série A1) | **Corinthians** | São Paulo | Qualified | N/A |
| Runners-up (Série A1) | **Palmeiras** | São Paulo | Not eligible | Qualified |
| 3rd place (Série A1) | Ferroviária | São Paulo | Not eligible | Not eligible |
| 4th place (Série A1) | **Internacional** | Rio Grande do Sul | Qualified | N/A |
| 5th place (Série A1) | São Paulo | São Paulo | Not eligible | Not eligible |
| 6th place (Série A1) | Santos | São Paulo | Not eligible | Not eligible |
| 7th place (Série A1) | **Grêmio** | Rio Grande do Sul | Not eligible | Qualified |
| 8th place (Série A1) | Kindermann/Avaí^{[a]} | Santa Catarina | — | — |
| 9th place (Série A1) | **Flamengo/Marinha** | Rio de Janeiro | Qualified | N/A |
| 10th place (Série A1) | **Real Brasília** | Distrito Federal | Qualified | N/A |
| 11th place (Série A1) | **Cruzeiro** | Minas Gerais | Qualified | N/A |
| 12th place (Série A1) | São José | São Paulo | Not eligible | Not eligible |
| Champions (Série A2) | Red Bull Bragantino | São Paulo | Not eligible | Not eligible |
| Runners-up (Série A2) | Atlético Mineiro | Minas Gerais | Not eligible | Not qualified |
| 3rd place (Série A2) | **ESMAC** | Pará | Qualified | N/A |
| 4th place (Série A2) | CRESSPOM | Distrito Federal | Not eligible | Not qualified |

2021 Women's State Ranking (2nd berth)
| Rank | State |
|---|---|
| 1 | São Paulo |
| 2 | Rio de Janeiro |
| 3 | Bahia |
| 4 | Pernambuco |
| 5 | Santa Catarina |
| 6 | Rio Grande do Sul |
| 7 | Amazonas |
| 8 | Paraná |
| 9 | Minas Gerais |
| 10 | Distrito Federal |
| 11 | Pará |
| 12 | Ceará |
⋮
| 27 | Roraima |

Source:CBF

^{a} When CBF announced the participating teams, Kindermann had disbanded the team and CBF discard them. In January 2022, Avaí took control and assured continuity of the team one more year.

== Draw ==
The draw was held on 17 January 2022, 15:30 at CBF headquarters in Rio de Janeiro. The 8 qualified teams were drawn in a single group (2022 Women's Club Ranking shown in parentheses).

Group
- (São Paulo (state)) Corinthians (1)
- (Rio de Janeiro (state)) Flamengo/Marinha (5)
- (Rio Grande do Sul) Internacional (7)
- (Rio Grande do Sul) Grêmio (9)
- (São Paulo (state)) Palmeiras (11)
- (Minas Gerais) Cruzeiro (15)
- (Pará) ESMAC (22)
- (Federal District (Brazil)) Real Brasília (25)

To determine the home teams, the 2022 Women's State Ranking of the participants was:

2022 Women's State Ranking
| Rank | State |
|---|---|
| 1 | São Paulo |
| 2 | Rio de Janeiro |
| 4 | Rio Grande do Sul |
| 6 | Distrito Federal |
| 7 | Minas Gerais |
| 12 | Pará |

Source:CBF

== Bracket ==
Quarter-finals
(São Paulo (state)) Corinthians | 3
(São Paulo (state)) Palmeiras | 0
(Rio Grande do Sul) Internacional | 0
(Federal District (Brazil)) Real Brasília | 1
(Rio de Janeiro (state)) Flamengo/Marinha | 2
(Pará) ESMAC | 0
(Rio Grande do Sul) Grêmio | 2
(Minas Gerais) Cruzeiro | 0

Semi-finals
(São Paulo (state)) Corinthians | 2
(Federal District (Brazil)) Real Brasília | 0
(Rio de Janeiro (state)) Flamengo/Marinha | 1 (3)
(Rio Grande do Sul) Grêmio (p) | 1 (4)

Final
(São Paulo (state)) Corinthians | 1
(Rio Grande do Sul) Grêmio | 0

== Quarter-finals ==
| Team 1 | Score | Team 2 |
|---|---|---|
| Grêmio (Rio Grande do Sul) | 2–0 | (Minas Gerais) Cruzeiro |
| Flamengo/Marinha (Rio de Janeiro (state)) | 2–0 | (Pará) ESMAC |
| Corinthians (São Paulo (state)) | 3–0 | (São Paulo (state)) Palmeiras |
| Internacional (Rio Grande do Sul) | 0–1 | (Federal District (Brazil)) Real Brasília |

=== Group A ===
4 February 2022
21:30

| Grêmio (Rio Grande do Sul) | 2–0 | (Minas Gerais) Cruzeiro |
|---|---|---|
| Patrícia Maldaner 75'; Dani Ortolan 90+3' (pen.) | Report |

Estádio do Vale, Novo Hamburgo
Attendance: 126
Referee: Rafael Rodrigo Klein (Rio Grande do Sul)

=== Group B ===
6 February 2022
10:30

| Flamengo/Marinha (Rio de Janeiro (state)) | 2–0 | (Pará) ESMAC |
|---|---|---|
| Darlene 15'; Duda 19' | Report |

Estádio Luso Brasileiro, Rio de Janeiro
Referee: Yuri Elino Ferreira da Cruz (Rio de Janeiro)

=== Group C ===
6 February 2022
10:30

| Corinthians (São Paulo (state)) | 3–0 | (São Paulo (state)) Palmeiras |
|---|---|---|
| Gabi Portilho 10'; Tamires 34'; Jaqueline 77' | Report |

Neo Química Arena, São Paulo
Attendance: 13,890
Referee: Daiane Caroline Muniz dos Santos (São Paulo)

=== Group D ===
4 February 2022
19:00

| Internacional (Rio Grande do Sul) | 0–1 | (Federal District (Brazil)) Real Brasília |
|---|---|---|
| | Report | Geovana Alves 45+2' |

Estádio Beira-Rio, Porto Alegre
Attendance: 1,261
Referee: Jonathan Giovanella Vivian (Rio Grande do Sul)

== Semi-finals ==
| Team 1 | Score | Team 2 |
|---|---|---|
| Flamengo/Marinha (Rio de Janeiro (state)) | 1–1 (3–4 p) | (Rio Grande do Sul) Grêmio |
| Corinthians (São Paulo (state)) | 2–0 | (Federal District (Brazil)) Real Brasília |

=== Group E ===
9 February 2022
15:30

| Flamengo/Marinha (Rio de Janeiro (state)) | 1–1 | (Rio Grande do Sul) Grêmio |
|---|---|---|
| Cida 7' | Report | Jéssica Soares 19' |
Penalties
| Duda (penalty scored); Kika Brandino (penalty scored); Anny Marabá (penalty missed); Monalisa (penalty missed); Darlene (penalty scored) | 3–4 | (penalty scored) Pri Back; (penalty scored) Dani Ortolan; (penalty missed) Tchula; (penalty scored) Jéssica Soares; (penalty scored) Caty |

Estádio Luso Brasileiro, Rio de Janeiro
Referee: Paulo Renato Moreira da Silva Coelho (Rio de Janeiro)

=== Group F ===
9 February 2022
18:00

| Corinthians (São Paulo (state)) | 2–0 | (Federal District (Brazil)) Real Brasília |
|---|---|---|
| Jheniffer 39'; Salazar 49' | Report |

Arena Barueri, Barueri
Attendance: 1,466
Referee: Adeli Mara Monteiro (São Paulo)

== Final ==
| Team 1 | Score | Team 2 |
|---|---|---|
| Corinthians (São Paulo (state)) | 1–0 | (Rio Grande do Sul) Grêmio |

=== Group G ===
13 February 2022
10:30

| Corinthians (São Paulo (state)) | 1–0 | (Rio Grande do Sul) Grêmio |
|---|---|---|
| Gabi Zanotti 90+4' | Report |

Neo Química Arena, São Paulo
Attendance: 19,547
Referee: Edina Alves Batista (São Paulo)

| Corinthians | Grêmio |

| GK | 23 | (Brazil) Paty |
| RB | 2 | (Brazil) Katiuscia | (substituted off) 24' |
| RCB | 4 | (Brazil) Giovanna Campiolo |
| LCB | 3 | (Brazil) Tarciane |
| LB | 71 | (Brazil) Yasmim |
| CM | 11 | (Colombia) Liana Salazar | (substituted off) 46' |
| RAM | 10 | (Brazil) Gabi Zanotti |
| LAM | 37 | (Brazil) Tamires (c) | (substituted off) 80' |
| RW | 18 | (Brazil) Gabi Portilho |
| CF | 9 | (Brazil) Jheniffer | (substituted off) 59' |
| LW | 16 | (Brazil) Adriana | (substituted off) 80' |
Substitutes:
| GK | 28 | (Brazil) Rillary |
| DF | 6 | (Brazil) Juliete |
| DF | 14 | (Brazil) Andressa Pereira |
| DF | 21 | (Brazil) Paulinha | (substituted on) 24' |
| MF | 7 | (Brazil) Grazi |
| MF | 8 | (Brazil) Diany | (substituted on) 46' |
| MF | 17 | (Brazil) Ellen Cristine | (substituted on) 80' |
| MF | 20 | (Brazil) Mariza |
| FW | 15 | (Brazil) Miriã | (substituted on) 80' |
| FW | 19 | (Brazil) Mylena Freitas |
| FW | 30 | (Brazil) Jaqueline | (substituted on) 59' |
| FW | 77 | (Brazil) Bianca Gomes |
Manager:
(Brazil) Arthur Elias

| GK | 23 | (Brazil) Lorena |
| RB | 2 | (Brazil) Laís Giacomel |
| RCB | 4 | (Brazil) Patrícia Maldaner | (yellow card) 69' |
| LCB | 3 | (Brazil) Tuani |
| LB | 6 | (Brazil) Jéssica Soares | (yellow card) 82' |
| RCM | 5 | (Brazil) Tchula |
| LCM | 7 | (Brazil) Pri Back (c) |
| RAM | 10 | (Brazil) Rafa Levis | | (substituted off) 59' |
| LAM | 11 | (Brazil) Caty | (yellow card) 26' |
| RS | 9 | (Brazil) Laís Estevam | | (substituted off) 75' |
| LS | 18 | (Brazil) Luany | | (substituted off) 83' |
Substitutes:
| GK | 12 | (Brazil) Iasmim Paixão |
| DF | 16 | (Brazil) Ana Guimarães |
| MF | 15 | (Brazil) Raíssa Bahia |
| MF | 27 | (Brazil) Dani Barão | | (substituted on) 75' |
| FW | 17 | (Brazil) Gabizinha |
| FW | 19 | (Brazil) Dani Ortolan | | (substituted on) 83' |
| FW | 28 | (Brazil) Cássia | | (substituted on) 59' |
Manager:
(Brazil) Patrícia Gusmão

Final MVP Award:
Gabi Zanotti (Corinthians)

Assistant referees:
Neuza Back (São Paulo)
Fabrini Bevilaqua Costa (São Paulo)
Fourth official:
Marianna Nanni Batalha (São Paulo)

Match rules

- 90 minutes.
- Penalty shoot-out if scores still level.
- Twelve named substitutes.
- Maximum of five substitutions.

== Top goalscorers ==
| Rank | Player | Club | Goals |
|---|---|---|---|
| 1 | Cida | Flamengo/Marinha | 1 |
| 1 | Dani Ortolan | Grêmio | 1 |
| 1 | Darlene | Flamengo/Marinha | 1 |
| 1 | Duda | Flamengo/Marinha | 1 |
| 1 | Gabi Portilho | Corinthians | 1 |
| 1 | Gabi Zanotti | Corinthians | 1 |
| 1 | Geovana Alves | Real Brasília | 1 |
| 1 | Jaqueline | Corinthians | 1 |
| 1 | Jéssica Soares | Grêmio | 1 |
| 1 | Jheniffer | Corinthians | 1 |
| 1 | Patrícia Maldaner | Grêmio | 1 |
| 1 | Liana Salazar | Corinthians | 1 |
| 1 | Tamires | Corinthians | 1 |
