= Nath Pitbull =

Brazilian footballer (born 1995)

Personal information
- Full name: Natália Carvalho da Silva
- Date of birth: 4 June 1995 (age 31)
- Place of birth: Jundiaí, Brazil
- Height: 1.68 m (5 ft 6 in)
- Position: Defensive midfielder

Team information
- Current team: Santos
- Number: 5

Senior career*
Years	Team	Apps	(Gls)
2013–2014	Vitória das Tabocas	3	(0)
2016	CRESSPOM		
2017	Audax	10	(1)
2017–2018	3B da Amazônia	10	(1)
2019	Audax	25	(1)
2019–2020	3B da Amazônia	16	(4)
2020	→ Iranduba (loan)	10	(0)
2021	São Paulo	3	(0)
2022	CRESSPOM	12	(0)
2022	Ceará	14	(2)
2023	Flamengo	6	(0)
2024	3B da Amazônia	5	(0)
2024–	Santos	41	(4)
- * Club domestic league appearances and goals as of 03:34, 24 December 2025 (UTC)

Natália Carvalho da Silva (born 4 June 1995), known as Nath Pitbull, is a Brazilian footballer who plays for Santos FC. Mainly a defensive midfielder, she can also play as a centre-back or a right-back.

== Career ==
Born in Jundiaí, São Paulo, Nath Pitbull began her career with Vitória das Tabocas in 2013, and subsequently represented CRESSPOM and Audax before joining 3B da Amazônia in 2017. She returned to Audax ahead of the 2019 season, before rejoining 3B later in the year.

Nath Pitbull played in the 2020 Campeonato Brasileiro de Futebol Feminino Série A1 on loan at Iranduba, after a partnership with 3B was established, and later returned to 3B before being announced at São Paulo on 11 January 2021. After being rarely used, she returned to CRESSPOM before signing for Ceará on 7 July 2022.

On 27 December 2022, Nath Pitbull agreed to a deal with Flamengo. Also a backup option, she returned to 3B in February 2024.

On 16 May 2024, Nath Pitbull signed a contract with Santos until the end of the year; she became the third player of 3B to join the club, after Karla Alves and Vitória Kaíssa. On 29 November, despite the club's first-ever relegation, she signed a new two-year deal.

== Career statistics ==
As of 24 December 2025

Appearances and goals by club, season and competition
Club	Season	League			State league		Cup		Continental		Other		Total	
Club	Season	Division	Apps	Goals	Apps	Goals	Apps	Goals	Apps	Goals	Apps	Goals	Apps	Goals
Vitória das Tabocas	2012	Série A1	3	0	?	?	—		—		—		3	0
Vitória das Tabocas	2014	Série A1	0	0	?	?	0	0	0	0	—		0	0
Vitória das Tabocas	Total		3	0	?	?	0	0	0	0	—		3	0
CRESSPOM	2016	Brasiliense	—		?	?	7	0	—		—		7	0
Audax	2017	Série A1	8	0	2	1	—		—		—		10	1
3B da Amazônia	2017	Amazonense	—		4	1	—		—		—		4	1
3B da Amazônia	2018	Série A2	3	0	3	0	—		—		—		6	0
3B da Amazônia	Total		3	0	7	1	—		—		—		10	1
Audax	2019	Série A1	16	1	9	0	—		—		—		25	1
3B da Amazônia	2019	Série A2	—		7	3	—		—		—		7	3
3B da Amazônia	2020	Série A2	7	1	2	0	—		—		—		9	1
3B da Amazônia	Total		7	1	9	3	—		—		—		16	4
Iranduba (loan)	2020	Série A1	10	0	—		—		—		—		10	0
São Paulo	2021	Série A1	3	0	0	0	—		—		—		3	0
CRESSPOM	2022	Série A1	12	0	—		—		—		—		12	0
Ceará	2022	Série A2	9	2	5	0	—		—		—		14	2
Flamengo	2023	Série A1	3	0	3	0	—		—		4 (Note: Appearance(s) in Copa Rio de Futebol Feminino)	0	10	0
3B da Amazônia	2024	Série A2	5	0	—		—		—		—		5	0
Santos	2024	Série A1	5	0	10	2	—		3 (Note: Appearance(s) in Copa Libertadores Femenina)	0	4 (Note: Appearance(s) in Copa Paulista de Futebol Feminino)	0	22	2
Santos	2025	Série A2	12	1	14	1	2	1	—		3	1	31	4
Santos	Total		17	1	24	3	2	1	3	0	7	1	53	6
Career total			96	5	59	8	9	1	3	0	11	1	178	15

== Honours ==
3B da Amazônia

- Campeonato Amazonense de Futebol Feminino: 2019

Ceará

- Campeonato Brasileiro de Futebol Feminino Série A2: 2022

Flamengo

- Campeonato Carioca de Futebol Feminino: 2023
- Copa Rio de Futebol Feminino: 2023

Santos

- Copa Paulista de Futebol Feminino: 2024
- Campeonato Brasileiro de Futebol Feminino Série A2: 2025
