= Sorriso (footballer, born 1994) =

Brazilian professional footballer (born 2000)

Personal information
- Full name: Ingrid de Paula Silva
- Date of birth: 10 November 1994 (age 31)
- Place of birth: São Paulo, Brazil
- Height: 1.63 m (5 ft 4 in)
- Position: Centre-back

Team information
- Current team: Flamengo
- Number: 4

Senior career*
Years	Team	Apps	(Gls)
2008	Centro Olímpico		
2010	Palmeiras		
2010	Santo André		
2013	Atlético Mineiro		
2013	Botafogo-PB	4	(0)
2013	EC São Bernardo		
2014	XV de Piracicaba		
2014	São Paulo		
2015	Kindermann	3	(1)
2016–2017	Iranduba	24	(2)
2017	3B da Amazônia	8	(2)
2018–2022	Internacional	105	(10)
2023	Palmeiras	14	(4)
2024–	Flamengo	3	(1)
- * Club domestic league appearances and goals as of 14:59, 10 December 2025 (UTC)

Ingrid de Paula Silva (born 10 November 1994), commonly known as Sorriso, is a Brazilian professional footballer who plays as a centre-back for Flamengo.

== Career ==
Born in São Paulo, Sorriso began her career playing futsal, before having her first senior experience at Centro Olímpico in 2008. She subsequently played for Palmeiras, Santo André, Atlético Mineiro, Botafogo-PB, EC São Bernardo, XV de Piracicaba, São Paulo and Kindermann before signing for Iranduba on 5 January 2016.

On 11 September 2017, Sorriso was announced at 3B da Amazônia. The following 8 January, she moved to Internacional, where she would establish herself as an undisputed starter during her five-year spell.

On 3 January 2023, Sorriso returned to Palmeiras. On 9 January of the following year, she signed for Flamengo, but would struggle with injuries afterwards.

== Honours ==
Internacional

- Campeonato Gaúcho de Futebol Feminino: 2019, 2020, 2021

Flamengo

- Campeonato Carioca de Futebol Feminino: 2024, 2025
- Copa Rio de Futebol Feminino: 2025

Individual

- Campeonato Brasileiro Série A1 Team of the Year: 2022
