= Tiago Haron =

Brazilian footballer

Personal information
- Full name: Tiago Haron Martins Barroso
- Date of birth: August 31, 1993 (age 33)
- Place of birth: Fortaleza, Brazil
- Height: 1.75 m (5 ft 9 in)
- Position: Attacking midfielder

Team information
- Current team: Flores da Cunha

Senior career*
Years	Team	Apps	(Gls)
2013–2015	Ferroviário	13	(1)
2016–	Flores da Cunha	0	(0)
- * Club domestic league appearances and goals as of April 7, 2016 ‡ National team caps and goals as of April 7, 2016

Tiago Haron Martins Barroso (born August 31, 1993) is a Brazilian footballer who plays as an attacking midfielder for Flores da Cunha in the Campeonato Gaúcho Série B.

== Career ==
Tiago Haron began his career in 2013 with Ferroviário, where he played for three seasons. Since February 2016, Tiago Haron plays for Flores da Cunha.
