= Yantén =

Yantén is a Spanish surname. Notable people with the surname include:

- Fabiana Yantén (born 1999), Colombian professional footballer
- Keyuk Yantén (born 1990), Chilean linguist of Selknam descent
- Mario Sánchez Yantén (born 1956), retired Chilean football referee
