= Dani Ortolan =

Brazilian footballer (born 1998)

Personal information
- Full name: Daniela Maria Lopes Ortolan
- Date of birth: 26 July 1998 (age 28)
- Place of birth: São Paulo, Brazil
- Height: 1.69 m (5 ft 7 in)
- Position: Forward

Team information
- Current team: Juventude

Youth career
- –2016: Juventus-SP

Senior career*
Years	Team	Apps	(Gls)
2016–2020	Juventus-SP		
2019	→ Grêmio Audax (loan)		
2021	Flamengo	13	(1)
2022–2024	Grêmio	31	(5)
2025	Hapoel Tel Aviv	13	(9)
2025–	Juventude	2	(1)
- * Club domestic league appearances and goals as of 2 October 2025

Daniela Maria Lopes Ortolan (born 27 July 1998), simply known as Dani Ortolan, is a Brazilian professional women's footballer who plays as a forward for Juventude.

== Career ==
Graduated from Juventus-SP, Dani Ortolan played for Grêmio Audax and Flamengo, before arriving at Grêmio where she played from 2022, becoming state champion. She suffered an anterior cruciate ligament injury at the 2023 season.

On 2025, Ortolan transferred to Hapoel Tel Aviv in Israel. On August, she returned to Brazil to play for Juventude.

== Honours ==
Flamengo

- Campeonato Carioca: 2021

Grêmio

- Campeonato Gaúcho: 2022
