= Paola (footballer) =

Brazilian footballer (born 2003)

Personal information
- Full name: Paola Pereira da Silva
- Date of birth: 23 May 2003 (age 23)
- Place of birth: Bauru, Brazil
- Height: 1.54 m (5 ft 1 in)
- Position: Forward

Team information
- Current team: Internacional

Youth career
- 2019: Noroeste
- 2019: Ferroviária
- 2020–2021: São Paulo
- 2022–2023: Atlético Mineiro
- 2024: Santos

Senior career*
Years	Team	Apps	(Gls)
2022–2023	Atlético Mineiro	1	(0)
2024	Santos	8	(1)
2025–	Internacional	0	(0)
- * Club domestic league appearances and goals as of 20:58, 19 December 2024 (UTC)

Paola Pereira da Silva (born 23 May 2003), simply known as Paola, is a Brazilian footballer who plays as a forward for Internacional.

== Career ==
Born in Bauru, São Paulo, Paola began her career with hometown side Noroeste before joining Ferroviária in 2019. In the following year, she moved to São Paulo, playing for their under-17 and under-18 squads.

Paola signed for Atlético Mineiro in 2022; initially a member of the under-20 team, she made her debut with the main squad on 18 September of that year, starting and scoring the winner in a 1–0 Campeonato Mineiro home win over Uberlândia. She would feature in only two more matches with the first team in the main squad, being mainly utilized with the under-20s.

Paola moved to Santos ahead of the 2024 season, also for the under-20 squad. She made her first team debut for the side on 15 March, coming on as a late substitute for Maria Alves in a 1–1 Campeonato Brasileiro de Futebol Feminino Série A1 home draw against Real Brasília, and scored her first goal on 22 May, in a 3–0 Campeonato Paulista away win over Pinda.

On 20 December 2024, Paola was announced at Internacional on a two-year deal.

== Honours ==
Santos

- Copa Paulista de Futebol Feminino: 2024
