= Lívia Mathias =

Brazilian footballer (born 2003)

Personal information
- Full name: Lívia Claro Mathias
- Date of birth: 30 January 2003 (age 23)
- Place of birth: Santo André, Brazil
- Height: 1.70 m (5 ft 7 in)
- Position: Right-back

Team information
- Current team: Mixto
- Number: 2

Youth career
- Centro Olímpico
- 2017: São Paulo
- 2018–2021: Santos
- 2021: Internacional
- 2022–2023: Corinthians

Senior career*
Years	Team	Apps	(Gls)
2022–2023	Corinthians	7	(0)
2024–2025	Santos	15	(0)
2026–	Mixto	3	(0)
- * Club domestic league appearances and goals as of 18:54, 17 March 2026 (UTC)

Lívia Claro Mathias (born 30 January 2003), known as Lívia Mathias or just Lívia, is a Brazilian footballer who plays as a right-back for Mixto.

== Career ==
Born in Santo André, São Paulo, Lívia represented the youth categories of Centro Olímpico, São Paulo, Santos and Internacional before moving to Corinthians in 2021, initially for the under-17 team. She made her professional debut with the latter side on 24 August 2022, starting in a 2–1 Campeonato Paulista home loss to Ferroviária.

On 1 February 2023, Lívia signed her first professional contract with Timão. On 18 December, after spending most of the year with the under-20 team, she left the club.

On 24 January 2024, Lívia returned to Santos on a two-year contract, now being assigned to the first team.

== Honours ==
Corinthians

- Campeonato Paulista de Futebol Feminino: 2023
- Copa Paulista de Futebol Feminino: 2022

Santos

- Copa Paulista de Futebol Feminino: 2024
- Campeonato Brasileiro de Futebol Feminino Série A2: 2025
