= Vitória Kaíssa =

Brazilian footballer (born 2001)

Personal information
- Full name: Vitória Kaíssa da Silva Nascimento
- Date of birth: 18 March 2001 (age 25)
- Place of birth: Fortaleza, Brazil
- Height: 1.58 m (5 ft 2 in)
- Position: Left-back

Team information
- Current team: América Mineiro
- Number: 2

Youth career
- 2017: Anjos do Céu
- 2018: São Gonçalo-CE
- 2019: Palmeiras

Senior career*
Years	Team	Apps	(Gls)
2017	Anjos do Céu	12	(2)
2018	São Gonçalo-CE	8	(0)
2018	Tiradentes-CE	7	(1)
2019	CRESSPOM	5	(0)
2019–2020	Palmeiras	30	(3)
2021	Grêmio	10	(0)
2022	Kindermann/Avaí	14	(2)
2023	Palmeiras	11	(0)
2024	3B da Amazônia	2	(1)
2024	Santos	11	(1)
2025–	América Mineiro	16	(0)
- * Club domestic league appearances and goals as of 17:57, 20 January 2026 (UTC)

Vitória Kaíssa da Silva Nascimento (born 18 March 2001), known as Vitória Kaíssa, is a Brazilian footballer who plays as a left-back for América Mineiro.

== Club career ==
Born in Fortaleza, Ceará, Vitória Kaíssa began her career with hometown side Anjos do Céu, playing in the 2017 Campeonato Cearense de Futebol Feminino. She moved to São Gonçalo-CE in the following year; initially with the under-20 squad, she featured with the main squad in the 2018 Campeonato Brasileiro de Futebol Feminino Série A2 before ending the season with Tiradentes-CE.

Vitória Kaíssa began the 2019 campaign with CRESSPOM, also playing in the second division, before joining Palmeiras and being initially assigned to the under-18 team. She was promoted to the latter's main squad in August, helping them to win the year's Copa Paulista de Futebol Feminino.

On 8 January 2021, Vitória Kaíssa was announced at Grêmio. Mainly a backup option during the year, she moved to Kindermann/Avaí in February 2022.

On 30 January 2023, Vitória Kaíssa returned to Palmeiras after signing a one-year contract. However, she was not a part of the squad which reached the 2023 Copa Libertadores Femenina final, and signed for 3B da Amazônia for the 2024 season.

On 15 May 2024, Vitória Kaíssa was announced at Santos, after signing a deal until the end of the year. The following 8 January, after featuring sparingly, she moved to América Mineiro on a one-year contract.

== International career ==
In November 2020, Vitória Kaíssa was called up to the Brazil national under-20 team.

== Honours ==
Palmeiras

- Copa Paulista de Futebol Feminino: 2019

Santos

- Copa Paulista de Futebol Feminino: 2024
