= Janaína =

Brazilian association football player

Personal information
- Full name: Janaína Queiroz Cavalcante
- Date of birth: 2 April 1988 (age 38)
- Place of birth: Fortaleza, Brazil
- Height: 1.72 m (5 ft 8 in)
- Position: Centre-back

Team information
- Current team: 3B da Amazônia

Youth career
- Nacional Gás/Unifor (futsal)

Senior career*
| Years | Team | Apps | (Gls) |
| 2004–2007 | Messejana | | |
| 2008–2011 | Santos | | |
| 2012 | Centro Olímpico | | |
| 2012 | Zorky Krasnogorsk | 5 | (1) |
| 2013 | São José | 1 | (0) |
| 2014 | Caucaia | 6 | (1) |
| 2015 | Santos | 3 | (0) |
| 2017–2020 | S.C. Braga | 43 | (10) |
| 2020 | Palmeiras | 11 | (0) |
| 2021 | Grêmio | 5 | (1) |
| 2021–2022 | Famalicão | 0 | (0) |
| 2023 | Botafogo | 2 | (0) |
| 2024 | Santos | 14 | (1) |
| 2025– | 3B da Amazônia | 0 | (0) |

International career^{‡}
| 2008–2009 | Brazil U20 | | |
| 2009–2013 | Brazil | 5 | (0) |
- * Club domestic league appearances and goals as of 21:19, 19 December 2024 (UTC) ‡ National team caps and goals as of 15:15, 29 December 2018 (UTC)

Janaína Queiroz Cavalcante (born 2 April 1988), known as Janaína or just Jana, is a Brazilian footballer who plays for 3B da Amazônia. A centre-back, her strongest attributes are marking and heading.

== Club career ==
Jana began playing futsal and progressed to playing football for her local team União Messejana, where she won the Ceará state league in 2005. In 2008 she attended a trial for Santos alongside 400 hopefuls and was one of two players to be signed up.

Jana subsequently played for Centro Olímpico, Zorky Krasnogorsk, São José and Caucaia before returning to Santos in 2015. In 2017, after a spell with Corinthians/Audax, she signed with S.C. Braga for the 2017–18 Campeonato Nacional de Futebol Feminino season and quickly became an important player for the club.

After short stints in her homeland with Palmeiras and Grêmio, Jana returned to Portuguese football in August 2021, agreeing to join Famalicão. After leaving the latter in 2022, she began the 2023 season nursing an injury, before signing for Botafogo on 3 March.

On 29 January 2024, Santos announced the return of Jana for a third spell.

== International career ==
Jana was part of the Brazil under-20 selection at the 2008 South American U-20 Women's Championship and subsequent 2008 FIFA U-20 Women's World Cup. In December 2009, she won four caps for the senior Brazil women's national football team at the 2009 International Women's Football Tournament of City of São Paulo, including a debut against Chile.

She made a further appearance for Brazil in September 2013, in a 1–0 win over New Zealand at the 2013 Valais Women's Cup.

== Career statistics ==
=== International ===
As of 29 January 2024

| Nation | Year | Apps | Goals |
|---|---|---|---|
| Brazil | 2009 | 4 | 0 |
| Brazil | 2013 | 1 | 0 |
| Total | | 5 | 0 |

== Honours ==
Santos

- Campeonato Paulista de Futebol Feminino: 2010, 2011
- Copa Libertadores Femenina: 2009, 2010
- Copa do Brasil de Futebol Feminino: 2008, 2009
- Copa Paulista de Futebol Feminino: 2024

São José

- Copa Libertadores Femenina: 2013

Corinthians/Audax

- Copa do Brasil de Futebol Feminino: 2016

Braga

- Supertaça de Portugal Feminina: 2018
- Campeonato Nacional Feminino: 2018–19
- Taça de Portugal Feminina: 2019–20
