= Kelly Chiavaro =

Italian footballer (born 1996)

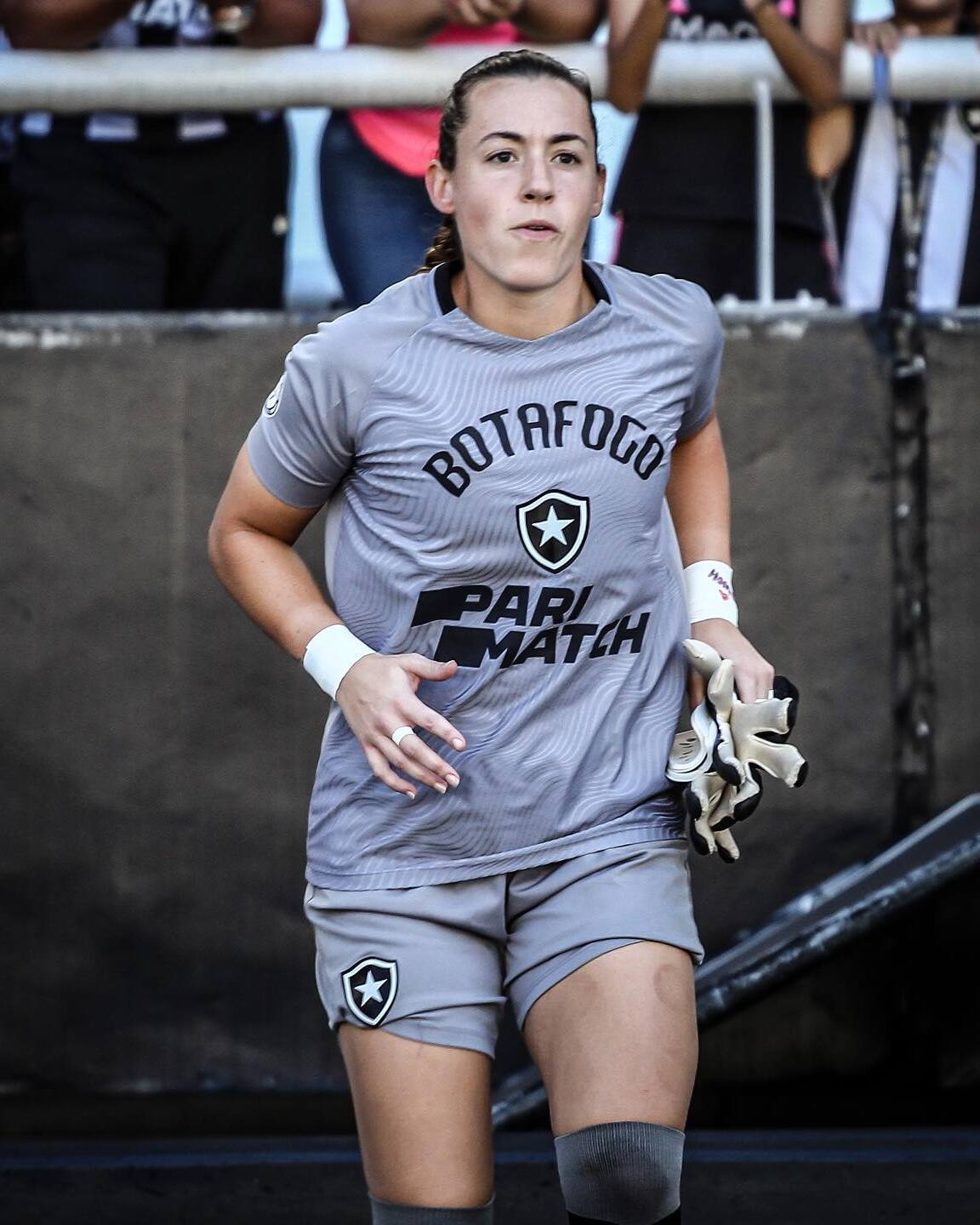
- Chiavaro with Botafogo in 2023

Personal information
- Date of birth: 3 July 1996 (age 30)
- Place of birth: Saint-Eustache, Québec, Canada
- Height: 1.74 m (5 ft 9 in)
- Position: Goalkeeper

Youth career
- AS Blainville
- Lakeshore SC

College career
Years	Team	Apps	(Gls)
2016–2019	Colgate Raiders	65	(0)

Senior career*
Years	Team	Apps	(Gls)
2018–2019	AS Blainville	15	(0)
2020	Maccabi Emek Hefer	7	(0)
2021	Napoli	0	(0)
2022	Flamengo	0	(0)
2023	Botafogo	1	(0)
2024–2025	Santos	11	(0)
2025	3B da Amazônia	8	(0)
2025	Ottawa Rapid FC	0	(0)

International career^{‡}
2022	Italy (beach)	3	(0)
- * Club domestic league appearances and goals as of 21 August 2024 ‡ National team caps and goals as of 2 July 2022

Kelly Chiavaro (born 3 July 1996) is a footballer and beach soccer player who plays as a goalkeeper. Born in Canada, she represented Italy internationally in beach soccer.

== Early life ==
Chiavaro played youth soccer with AS Blainville and Lakeshore SC.

== College career ==
In 2016, Chiavaro joined Colgate Raiders in the United States. Chiavaro appeared in 65 games during her four-year college career at Colgate University, recording 270 saves and 17 shutouts. In her Junior year in 2018 she was named Patriot League Goalkeeper of the Year.

== Club career ==
In 2018 and 2019, she played with AS Blainville in the Première ligue de soccer du Québec.

In 2020, Chiavaro signed for Maccabi Emek Hefer WFC of the Ligat Nashim, Israel's first division. In 2021, she joined Italian Club Napoli which competes in the Italian top flight, Serie A.

In 2022, Chiavaro signed for Brasileiro Feminino Série A1 club CR Flamengo. On April 13, 2023 it was announced that Chiavaro signed with Botafogo, competing in Brasileiro Feminino Série A2.

On January 11, 2024, Chiavaro was announced at Santos in the Brazilian top tier. A backup to Karen Hipólito during most of the year, she left the club on January 23, 2025, after rescinding her contract. Upon leaving, she released a statement in his social media claiming to have witnessed several episodes of verbal abuse and harassments during her period at the club; she also said that the "club was aware of the facts, but no measures were taken".

In March 2025, she joined 3B da Amazônia.

In late July 2025, she returned to Canada to sign with Northern Super League club Ottawa Rapid FC.

== International career ==
Chiavaro holds dual nationality, Canadian and Italian. In 2022 while playing for Napoli, she was capped by the Italy women's national beach soccer team. She took part in the European Beach Soccer Cup. The competition took place in Nazaré, Portugal.

== Personal life ==
Chiavaro is in a relationship with Argentine footballer Sole Jaimes. The pair met in Italy where they both played soccer for Napoli. In September 2023, the couple announced they were expecting a baby girl in February 2024.

== Honours ==
Santos

- Copa Paulista de Futebol Feminino: 2024
