= Karla Alves =

Brazilian footballer (born 1999)

Personal information
- Full name: Karla Karolina Alves Machado
- Date of birth: 23 November 1999 (age 26)
- Place of birth: Curitiba, Brazil
- Position: Midfielder

Team information
- Current team: São Paulo
- Number: 5

Youth career
- Foz Cataratas

Senior career*
Years	Team	Apps	(Gls)
2015–2016	Foz Cataratas	1	(0)
2017–2018	Santos	1	(0)
2019–2020	Palmeiras	38	(2)
2021	Minas Brasília	22	(3)
2022	Grêmio	20	(7)
2023	Real Brasília	14	(1)
2023	Grêmio	9	(4)
2024	3B da Amazônia	1	(1)
2024	Santos	16	(4)
2025–	São Paulo	29	(2)

International career
2016	Brazil U17		
2017–2018	Brazil U20	3	(0)
- * Club domestic league appearances and goals as of 17:51, 20 January 2026 (UTC)

Karla Karolina Alves Machado (born 23 November 1999), known as Karla Alves or just Karla, is a Brazilian footballer who plays as a midfielder for São Paulo.

== Club career ==
Born in Curitiba, Paraná, Karla began her career with Foz Cataratas in 2015. In 2017, she joined Santos, but was mainly a backup option during her spell at the club, featuring in just one Campeonato Paulista de Futebol Feminino match.

Karla moved to Palmeiras ahead of the 2019 season, and featured regularly as they achieved promotion from the Campeonato Brasileiro de Futebol Feminino Série A2 in that year. In 2021, she signed for Minas Brasília.

On 3 January 2022, Karla was announced at Grêmio. She returned to the Federal District after agreeing to a deal with Real Brasília in January 2023, but returned to Grêmio on 2 August of that year.

Presented at 3B da Amazônia in February 2024, Karla featured in just one match, in the debut of the Brazilian Series A2 against VF4-PB, before leaving on 19 April. Hours later, she was announced back at Santos on a contract until the end of the year.

On 3 January 2025, Karla moved to São Paulo.

== International career ==
Karla represented Brazil at under-17 and under-20 levels.

== Honours ==
Santos

- Campeonato Brasileiro de Futebol Feminino Série A1: 2017
- Campeonato Paulista de Futebol Feminino: 2018

Palmeiras

- Copa Paulista de Futebol Feminino: 2019

Santos

- Copa Paulista de Futebol Feminino: 2024

São Paulo

- Supercopa do Brasil: 2025

Brazil U20

- South American U-20 Women's Championship: 2018
