= Flores da Cunha Futebol Clube =

Flores da Cunha
- Full name: Flores da Cunha Futebol Clube
- Founded: January 16, 2016
- Ground: Estádio Homero Soldatelli, Flores da Cunha, Brazil
- Capacity: 1,500
- President: Fernando Otto
- Head Coach: Franco Müller
- League: Campeonato Gaúcho Série B
- Website: http://floresdacunhafc.com.br/

Flores da Cunha Futebol Clube, also known as Flores da Cunha, is a Brazilian soccer club based in Flores da Cunha, Brazil.

== History ==
This club was founded on January 16, 2016.

== Honours ==
=== Women's Football ===
- Campeonato Gaúcho de Futebol Feminino
  - Winners (1): 2011

== Stadium ==
Flores da Cunha play their home games at Estádio Homero Soldatelli in Flores da Cunha. The stadium has a maximum capacity of 1,500 people.
