= Aldana Narváez =

Argentine footballer (born 2001)

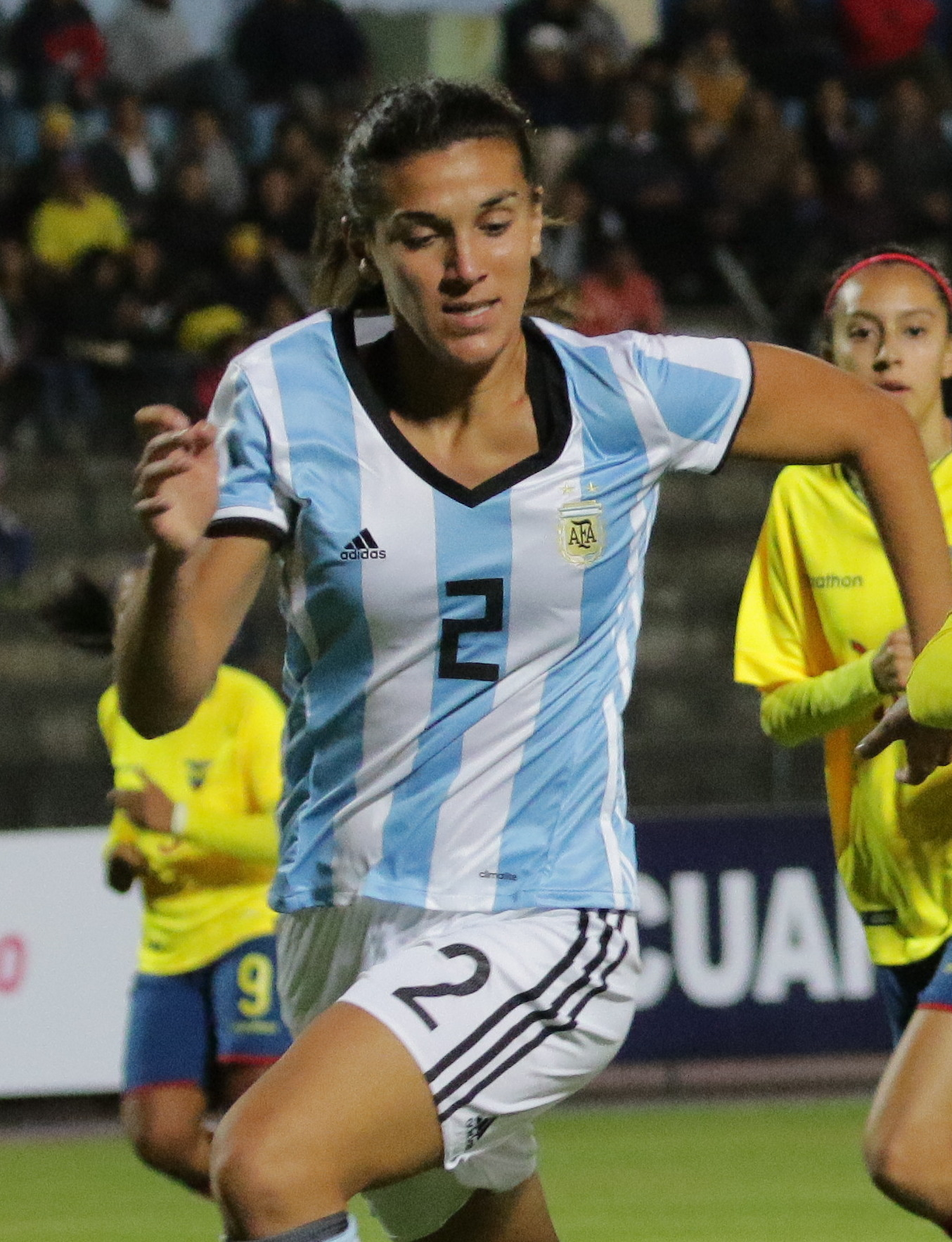
- Narváez playing for the Argentina national under-20 team in 2018

Personal information
- Date of birth: 22 May 2001 (age 25)
- Place of birth: Rosario, Argentina
- Height: 1.72 m (5 ft 8 in)
- Position: Centre-back

Team information
- Current team: Newell's Old Boys

Youth career
- Unión Americana
- Social Lux

Senior career*
Years	Team	Apps	(Gls)
2020–2022	Racing Club		(7)
2023	Banfield		(2)
2024	Santos	8	(1)
2025–	Newell's Old Boys	0	(0)

International career
2018	Argentina U17	1	(0)
2018–2020	Argentina U20	3	(0)
- * Club domestic league appearances and goals as of 21:15, 19 December 2024 (UTC)

Aldana Narváez (born 22 May 2001) is an Argentine professional footballer who plays as a central defender for Newell's Old Boys.

== Club career ==
Born in Rosario, Narváez began her career with Unión Americana FC before joining CSyD Social Lux, where she played futsal alongside football. On 2 August 2020, she signed a contract with Racing Club until 2022.

On 23 December 2022, Narváez moved to Banfield. On 22 January 2024, she moved abroad for the first time in her career, after signing a one-year contract with Santos in Brazil.

On 15 January 2025, Narváez returned to her home country after joining Newell's Old Boys.

== International career ==
Narváez represented Argentina at under-17 and under-20 levels, the latter in the 2020 South American Under-20 Women's Football Championship.

== Honours ==
Santos

- Copa Paulista de Futebol Feminino: 2024
