= Camila Martins =

Brazilian footballer (born 1990)

Personal information
- Full name: Camila Martins de Aguiar
- Date of birth: 26 September 1990 (age 36)
- Place of birth: Recife, Brazil
- Height: 1.77 m (5 ft 10 in)
- Position: Centre back

Team information
- Current team: Colo-Colo

Youth career
- Náutico

Senior career*
Years	Team	Apps	(Gls)
2010	Sport Recife		
2011–2012	Vitória das Tabocas		
2013–2014	São Francisco	13	(2)
2015–2018	Santos	23	(0)
2019–2020	Shanghai Shengli	?	(1)
2021–2024	Santos	43	(4)
2025–	Colo-Colo	0	(0)
- * Club domestic league appearances and goals as of 20:51, 19 December 2024 (UTC)

Camila Martins de Aguiar (born 26 September 1990), known as Camila Martins or simply Camila, is a Brazilian footballer who plays as a central defender for Chilean club Colo-Colo.

== Club career ==
Born in Recife, Pernambuco, Camila Martins represented Náutico, Sport Recife and Vitória das Tabocas before moving to São Francisco in 2013. In 2015, she joined Santos, being initially a backup option Calan.

After Calan retired, Camila Martins became an undisputed starter for Peixe before moving abroad for the 2019 season with Chinese side Shanghai Shengli. She returned to her home country in 2019 after the season ended, but delayed her return to China for a few months due to the due COVID-19 pandemic outbreak in the country.

On 8 February 2021, Camila Martins was presented back at Santos for the 2021 campaign. She played for the club for four seasons, before moving to Chilean side Colo-Colo on 17 January 2025.

== International career ==
On 9 November 2017, Camila Martins was called up by Brazil national team manager Vadão for two friendlies against Chile.

== Honours ==
Santos

- Campeonato Brasileiro Série A1: 2017
- Campeonato Paulista: 2018
- Copa Paulista: 2024

Colo-Colo

- Primera División de Chile: 2026
