= SC Internacional (women) =

Women's football club based in Porto Alegre, Rio Grande do Sul, Brazil

Internacional
- Full name: Sport Club Internacional
- Nickname: Gurias Coloradas
- Founded: 1983
- Ground: Estádio Beira-Rio
- Capacity: 50,128
- President: Alessandro Barcellos
- Head coach: Maurício Salgado
- League: Campeonato Brasileiro Série A1; Campeonato Gaúcho
- 2025 2025: Série A1, 12th of 16; Gaúcho, 3rd of 5
| Home colours | Away colours | Third colours |

Sport Club Internacional, commonly known as Internacional or Gurias Coloradas, is a Brazilian women's Association football club, based in the city of Porto Alegre, Rio Grande do Sul, Brazil. They won the Campeonato Gaúcho de Futebol Feminino fifteen times.

== History ==
Founded in 1983 as a women's section of Sport Club Internacional, winning the first two editions of the Campeonato Gaúcho de Futebol Feminino before the tournament was stopped. In 1984, the club also finished third in the Taça Brasil de Futebol Feminino.

Internacional was again third in the league in the 1996, 1998 and 2001 editions, while also winning three Gaúcho titles in a row in 1997, 1998 and 1999. After finishing second in the Gaúcho during the 2000 and 2001 editions, the club won two consecutive titles in 2002 and 2003, before ceasing activities in 2011.

After a period of inactivity, Internacional re-opened their women's football section in 2017, and immediately won another Gaúcho title. They lost the 2018 title to rivals Grêmio, but won three titles in a row in 2019, 2020 and 2021.

== Players ==
=== Current squad ===
As of 13 April 2026.

Note: Flags indicate national team as defined under FIFA eligibility rules; some limited exceptions apply. Players may hold more than one non-FIFA nationality.

| No. | Pos. | Nation | Player |
|---|---|---|---|
| 1 | GK | BRA | Gabi Barbieri |
| 3 | DF | BRA | Bruna Benites |
| 4 | DF | BRA | Sorriso |
| 5 | MF | BRA | Lelê |
| 7 | FW | BRA | Darlene |
| 8 | FW | BRA | Paola |
| 9 | FW | ARG | Sole Jaimes |
| 10 | MF | BRA | Julia Bianchi |
| 11 | FW | BRA | Caty |
| 12 | GK | BRA | Mari Ribeiro |
| 13 | FW | URU | Clara Guell |
| 14 | DF | BRA | Bianca Martins |
| 15 | DF | BRA | Débora |
| 18 | MF | BRA | Joana |
| 19 | FW | URU | Julieta Morales |
| 20 | MF | BRA | Pati Llanos |

| No. | Pos. | Nation | Player |
|---|---|---|---|
| 21 | DF | BRA | Paulinha |
| 22 | MF | BRA | Mayara Vaz |
| 23 | FW | BRA | Valéria Cantuário |
| 25 | MF | BRA | Alice Santos |
| 26 | GK | CAN | Kelly Chiavaro |
| 28 | FW | BRA | Aninha |
| 29 | FW | BRA | Alice Goedert |
| 30 | FW | BRA | Soll |
| 32 | FW | BRA | Gabi Inácio |
| 33 | DF | BRA | Eskerdinha |
| 36 | DF | BRA | Sarah Maciel |
| 44 | DF | PAR | Vanessa Arnaboldi |
| 55 | MF | BRA | Jordana |
| 88 | GK | BRA | Bárbara |
| 97 | DF | BRA | Gi Santos |

=== Out on loan ===
Note: Flags indicate national team as defined under FIFA eligibility rules; some limited exceptions apply. Players may hold more than one non-FIFA nationality.

| No. | Pos. | Nation | Player |
|---|---|---|---|
| — | GK | BRA | Tainá (at América Mineiro until 31 December 2026) |
| — | DF | BRA | Letícia Debiasi (at Botafogo until 31 December 2026) |

| No. | Pos. | Nation | Player |
|---|---|---|---|
| — | DF | BRA | Mônica Bitencourt (at Vitória until 31 December 2026) |
| — | FW | BRA | Anny Marabá (at Atlético Mineiro until 31 December 2026) |

== Honours ==
=== Official tournaments ===
National
| Competitions | Titles | Seasons |
|---|---|---|
| Copa do Brasil | 1 | 2026 |
State
| Competitions | Titles | Seasons |
| Campeonato Gaúcho | 15 | 1983, 1984, 1985, 1986, 1987, 1997, 1998, 1999, 2002, 2003, 2017, 2019, 2020, 2021, 2023 |

- record

=== Friendly tournaments ===
- Brasil Ladies Cup (1): 2023
- Copa Cidade de Gravataí (1) 2001
- Copa Novo Hamburgo (1): 2003

=== Youth team ===
- Fiesta CONMEBOL Evolución Sub-16 (1): 2020
- Campeonato Brasileiro Feminino Sub-20 (2): 2022, 2023
- Campeonato Brasileiro Feminino Sub-18 (1): 2019
- Campeonato Brasileiro Feminino Sub-17 (2): 2022, 2024
- Campeonato Brasileiro Feminino Sub-16 (1): 2020
- Liga de Desenvolvimento Sub-16 (1): 2019
- Liga de Desenvolvimento Sub-14 (1): 2021
- Campeonato Gaúcho Sub-18 (1): 2019
- Campeonato Gaúcho Sub-17 (6): 2017, 2018, 2019 (sub-16), 2021, 2022, 2023
- Campeonato Gaúcho Sub-15 (3): 2017, 2018, 2019 (sub-14)

== See also ==
- SC Internacional
