= Danielli =

Brazilian footballer (born 1987)

Personal information
- Full name: Danielli Pereira da Silva
- Date of birth: 21 January 1987 (age 39)
- Place of birth: Itambacuri, Brazil
- Height: 1.62 m (5 ft 4 in)
- Positions: Left-back; midfielder

Team information
- Current team: 3B da Amazônia

Senior career*
| Years | Team | Apps | (Gls) |
| 2007–2011 | Santos | | |
| 2012 | XV de Piracicaba | | |
| 2012–2013 | São José | | |
| 2014–2015 | Kubanochka | 25 | (3) |
| 2016–2019 | Santos | 40 | (4) |
| 2020–2023 | São Paulo | 51 | (2) |
| 2024 | Santos | 13 | (1) |
| 2024 | → Atlético Mineiro (loan) | 0 | (0) |
| 2025– | 3B da Amazônia | 0 | (0) |

International career
| 2008–2013 | Brazil | 14 | (0) |
- * Club domestic league appearances and goals as of 20:58, 19 December 2024 (UTC)

Danielli Pereira da Silva (born 21 January 1987), known as Danielli, Dani Silva or Dani, is a Brazilian footballer who plays as a left-back or a midfielder for 3B da Amazônia.

== Club career ==
Danielli began his career with Santos in 2007. In 2012, after a short period at XV de Piracicaba, she joined São José. She scored a goal for the latter club in the 2013 Copa Libertadores Femenina final, helping the side to lift their first-ever title in the competition.

In 2016, after playing for Russian side Kubanochka Krasnodar, Danielli returned to Santos. She left Santos for São Paulo FC ahead of the 2020 season.

On 23 January 2024, Danielli was announced back at Santos for a third spell, on a one-year contract.

== International career ==
She was part of the Brazil women's national football team at the 2012 Summer Olympics. She was called up two days before the start of the tournament when magnetic resonance imaging revealed that Elaine had a muscle injury.

== Career statistics ==
=== International ===
As of 13 November 2023

| Nation | Year | Apps | Goals |
|---|---|---|---|
| Brazil | 2008 | 3 | 0 |
| Brazil | 2009 | 3 | 0 |
| Brazil | 2012 | 4 | 0 |
| Brazil | 2013 | 4 | 0 |
| Total | | 14 | 0 |

== Honours ==
Santos

- Campeonato Paulista de Futebol Feminino: 2007, 2010, 2011, 2018
- Copa Libertadores Femenina: 2009, 2010
- Copa do Brasil de Futebol Feminino: 2008, 2009
- Campeonato Brasileiro de Futebol Feminino Série A1: 2017

São José

- Copa Libertadores Femenina: 2013
