= Cristalândia do Piauí =

Municipality of Cristalândia do Piauí Município de Cristalândia do Piauí
- Location in Piauí and Brazil
- Coordinates: 10°39′10″S 45°11′06″W
- Country: Brazil
- Region: Northeast
- State: Piauí
- Settled: December 5, 1962

Government
  - Mayor: Ariano Nogueira (PR)

Area
  - Total: 1,202.901 km^{2} (464.443 sq mi)
- Elevation: 469 m (1,539 ft)

Population (2020)
  - Total: 8,323
  - Density: 5.7/km^{2} (15/sq mi)
- Time zone: UTC−3 (BRT)
- HDI (2000): 0.601 – medium

Cristalândia do Piauí is the southernmost city of the Brazilian state of Piauí.
