= Sole Jaimes =

Argentine footballer (born 1989)

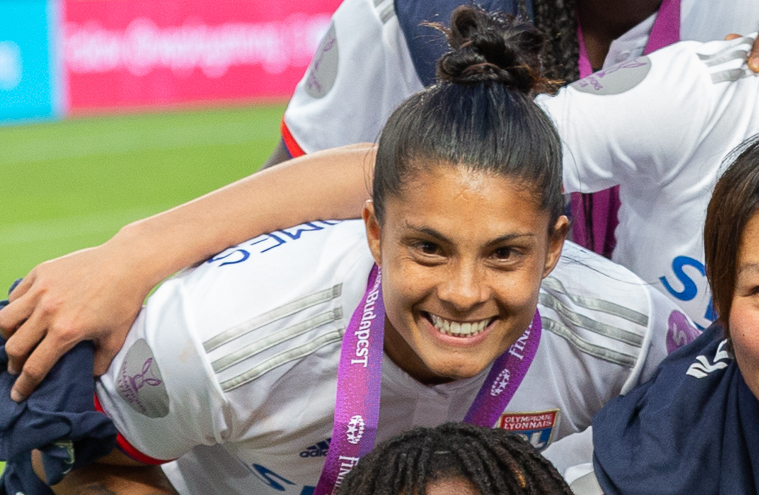

Personal information
- Full name: Florencia Soledad Jaimes
- Date of birth: 20 January 1989 (age 37)
- Place of birth: Nogoyá, Argentina
- Height: 1.82 m (6 ft 0 in)
- Position: Striker

Team information
- Current team: 3B da Amazônia

Youth career
- 2004–2008: Boca Juniors

Senior career*
Years	Team	Apps	(Gls)
2008–2014	Boca Juniors		
2009–2010	→ River Plate (loan)		
2014	Foz Cataratas		
2015	São Paulo		
2015–2017	Santos	29	(21)
2018	Dalian Quanjian		
2019	Lyon	5	(1)
2019	Santos	6	(4)
2020–2021	Changchun Zhuoyue		
2021	→ Santos (loan)	9	(5)
2021–2022	Napoli	14	(2)
2022–2024	Flamengo	18	(7)
2024	Santos	5	(1)
2025-	3b da Amazônia	0	(0)

International career^{‡}
2008	Argentina U20	3	(1)
2014–	Argentina	33	(7)
- * Club domestic league appearances and goals as of 21:10, 19 December 2024 (UTC) ‡ National team caps and goals as of 04:56, 23 May 2021 (UTC)

Florencia Soledad "Sole" Jaimes (born 20 January 1989) is an Argentine professional footballer who plays as a striker for 3B da Amazônia and the Argentina national team.

== Club career ==
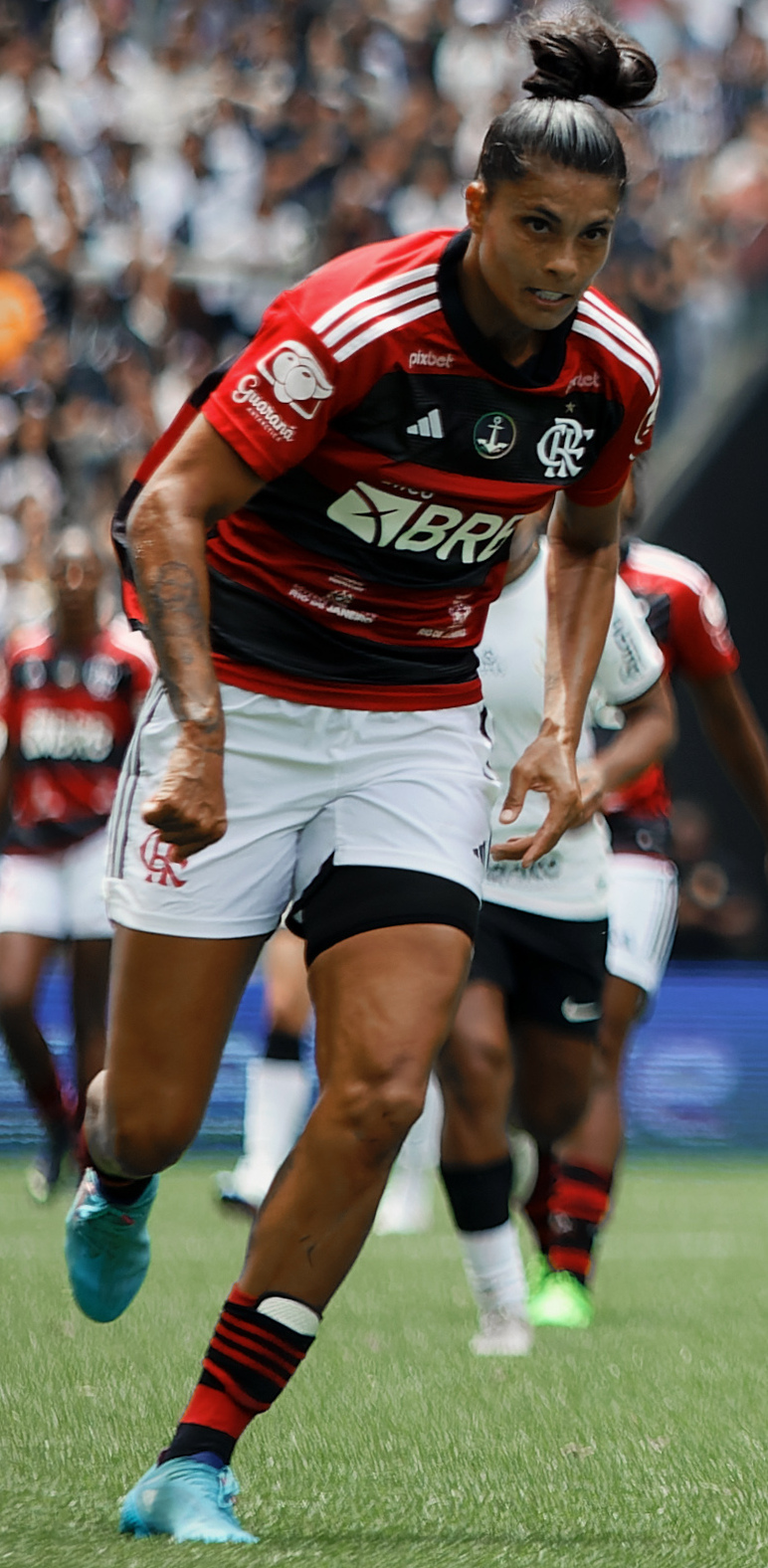
Jaimes with Flamengo in 2023

Jaimes played for Boca Juniors and River Plate in her home country before moving to Brazil in 2014, with Foz Cataratas. In 2015, after a brief period at São Paulo, she joined Santos.

Initially a backup option, Jaimes became a regular starter in the 2016 season, and impressed with 18 goals in the 2017 Campeonato Brasileiro de Futebol Feminino Série A1, being the top goalscorer of the competition. This led to a move to Chinese side Dalian Quanjian, where she stayed for a year before joining Lyon.

On 11 July 2019, Jaimes returned to Santos on a contract until the end of the year. She then moved back to China for the 2020 campaign with Changchun Zhuoyue.

On 21 May 2021, Jaimes returned to Santos for a third spell after agreeing to a three-month loan deal. She moved to Napoli in September, before returning to Brazil with Flamengo on 1 July 2022.

On 5 June 2024, days after leaving Fla, Jaimes returned to Santos on a contract until December 2025. On 12 March 2025, she rescinded her link with the club.

== International career ==
Jaimes represented Argentina at the 2008 FIFA U-20 Women's World Cup. At senior level, she played two Copa América Femenina editions (2014 and 2018), scoring five goals in the latter, and the 2015 Pan American Games. (Note: 2015 Pan American Games matches are not recognised by FIFA.)

== Personal life ==
Jaimes has a relationship with Canadian-born Italian footballer Kelly Chiavaro. The pair met in Italy where they both played soccer for Napoli. In September 2023, the couple announced they were expecting a baby girl in February 2024.

== Career statistics ==
=== International ===
As of 23 May 2021

Argentina
Year	Apps	Goals
2014	10	0
2015	0 (Note: Two matches in the 2015 Pan American Games, not recognized by FIFA)	0
2017	1	0
2018	7	5
2019	12	2
2021	3	0
Total	33	7

=== International goals ===
Scores and results list Argentina's goal tally first

No.	Date	Venue	Opponent	Score	Result	Competition
1	7 April 2018	Estadio Municipal Francisco Sánchez Rumoroso, Coquimbo, Chile	Bolivia	1–0	3–0	2018 Copa América Femenina
2	7 April 2018	Estadio Municipal Francisco Sánchez Rumoroso, Coquimbo, Chile	Bolivia	2–0	3–0	2018 Copa América Femenina
3	9 April 2018	Estadio Municipal Francisco Sánchez Rumoroso, Coquimbo, Chile	Ecuador	4–2	6–3	2018 Copa América Femenina
4	13 April 2018	Estadio Municipal Francisco Sánchez Rumoroso, Coquimbo, Chile	Venezuela	1–0	2–0	2018 Copa América Femenina
5	16 April 2018	Estadio La Portada, La Serena, Chile	Colombia	2–1	3–1	2018 Copa América Femenina
6	23 May 2019	Estadio Provincial Juan Gilberto Funes, La Punta, Argentina	Uruguay	2–0	3–1	Friendly
7	1 September 2019	Pacaembu Stadium, São Paulo, Brazil	Costa Rica	1–2	1–3	2019 International Women's Football Tournament

== Honours ==
=== Club ===
Boca Juniors

- Campeonato de Fútbol Femenino: 2008 Clausura, 2009 Apertura, 2010 Apertura, 2011 Clausura, 2011 Apertura, 2012 Apertura, 2013 Clausura, 2013 Inicial

River Plate

- Campeonato de Fútbol Femenino: 2010 Clausura

Santos

- Campeonato Brasileiro de Futebol Feminino: 2017
- Copa Paulista de Futebol Feminino: 2024

Lyon

- UEFA Women's Champions League: 2018–19
