= Campeonato Gaúcho de Futebol Feminino =

Women's football league in Rio Grande do Sul, Brazil

Campeonato Gaúcho Feminino
- Founded: 1983
- Country: Brazil
- Confederation: Associação Gaúcha de Futebol Feminino (1983–2017); FGF (2018–)
- Promotion to: Brasileiro Série A3
- Current champions: Grêmio (6th title) (2025)
- Most championships: Internacional (15 titles)

The Campeonato Gaúcho de Futebol Feminino is the women's football state championship of Rio Grande do Sul State, and is contested since 1983.

== List of champions ==
Following is the list with all recognized titles of Campeonato Gaúcho Feminino:

Season	Champions	Runners-up
1983	Internacional (1)	Grêmio
1984	Internacional (2)	Esportivo
1985	Internacional (3)	
1986	Internacional (4)	
1987	Internacional (5)	
1988–1996	Not held	
1997	Internacional (6)	Gramadense
1998	Internacional (7)	Grêmio
1999	Internacional (8)	Grêmio
2000	Grêmio (1)	Internacional
2001	Grêmio (2)	Internacional
2002	Internacional (9)	Grêmio
2003	Internacional (10)	Veranópolis
2004	Juventude (1)	Lazio Porto Alegre
2005	Juventude (2)	Vernisul
2006	Juventude (3)	Vernisul
2007	Not held	
2008	Pelotas (1)	Juventude
2009	Torrense (1)	Black Show
2010	Gaúcho FF (1)	Flamengo de Alegrete
2011	Flores da Cunha (1)	Internacional
2012	Tapejarense (1)	Ijuí
2013	Atlântico (1)	Duda/Canoas
2014	Onze Unidos (1)	Duda/Canoas
2015	Duda/Canoas (1)	Atlântico
2016	Duda/Canoas (2)	Black Show
2017	Internacional (11)	Grêmio
2018	Grêmio (3)	Internacional
2019	Internacional (12)	Grêmio
2020	Internacional (13)	Grêmio
2021	Internacional (14)	Grêmio
2022	Grêmio (4)	Internacional
2023	Internacional (15)	Grêmio
2024	Grêmio (5)	Internacional
2025	Grêmio (6)	Juventude

Note

- According to the website of former athlete and football coordinator Duda Luizelli, Internacional won the championships of 1985, 1986 and 1987.

== Titles by team ==
Teams in bold stills active.

Rank	Club	Winners	Winning years
1	**Internacional**	15	1983, 1984, 1985, 1986, 1987, 1997, 1998, 1999, 2002, 2003, 2017, 2019, 2020, 2021, 2023
2	**Grêmio**	5	2000, 2001, 2018, 2022, 2024, 2025
3	**Juventude**	3	2004, 2005, 2006
4	Duda/Canoas	2	2015, 2016
5	**Atlântico**	1	2013
5	Flores da Cunha	1	2011
5	Gaúcho FF	1	2010
5	Onze Unidos	1	2014
5	Pelotas	1	2008
5	Tapejarense	1	2012
5	Torrense	1	2009

=== By city ===
City	Championships	Clubs
Porto Alegre	21	Internacional (15), Grêmio (6)
Canoas	3	Duda/Canoas (2), Gaúcho FF (1)
Caxias do Sul	3	Juventude (3)
Cachoeirinha	1	Onze Unidos (1)
Erechim	1	Atlântico (1)
Flores da Cunha	1	Flores da Cunha (1)
Pelotas	1	Pelotas (1)
Tapejara	1	Tapejarense (1)
Torres	1	Torrense (1)
