= Fabiana Yantén =

Colombian footballer (born 1999)

Personal information
- Full name: Angie Fabiana Yantén Riascos
- Date of birth: 16 May 1999 (age 27)
- Place of birth: Candelaria, Colombia
- Height: 1.69 m (5 ft 7 in)
- Positions: Centre-back; left-back

Youth career
- Real Juanchito
- Generaciones Palmiranas

Senior career*
Years	Team	Apps	(Gls)
2019	Cortuluá		
2020	Deportivo Pasto		
2021–2024	América de Cali	51	(2)
2021	→ Alianza Lima (loan)	0	(0)
2024	→ Santos (loan)	1	(0)
2025	Colo-Colo		

International career
2022–	Colombia	3	(0)
- * Club domestic league appearances and goals as of 15:03, 27 August 2024 (UTC)

Angie Fabiana Yantén Riascos (born 16 May 1999) is a Colombian professional footballer who plays as either a centre-back or a left-back.

== Club career ==
Born in Villagorgona, Candelaria, Valle del Cauca, Yantén represented Real Juanchito and Generaciones Palmiranas as a youth, before making her senior debut with Cortuluá in 2019. In 2020, she moved to Deportivo Pasto.

On 17 February 2021, Yantén was announced at América de Cali. She was an unused substitute in the 2020 Copa Libertadores Femenina final against Ferroviária, as América lost 2–1.

On 1 October 2021, Yantén and other three América teammates were loaned out to Alianza Lima for the 2021 Copa Libertadores Femenina. Upon returning, Yantén won the 2022 Liga Femenina with América.

On 12 August 2024, Yantén was announced at Santos on loan until the end of the year; she became the first Colombian to play for the side. On 17 January of the following year, she moved to Colo-Colo in Chile.

== International career ==
On 26 August 2022, Yantén was called up to the Colombia women's national team for two friendlies against Costa Rica. She made her full international debut on 3 September, starting in a 1–0 win at the Estadio Deportivo Cali.

== Career statistics ==
=== International ===
As of 26 August 2024

National team	Year	Apps	Goals
Colombia	2022	1	0
Colombia	2024	2	0
Total		3	0

== Honours ==
Santos

- Copa Paulista de Futebol Feminino: 2024
