= Maria Alves (footballer) =

Brazilian footballer (born 1993)

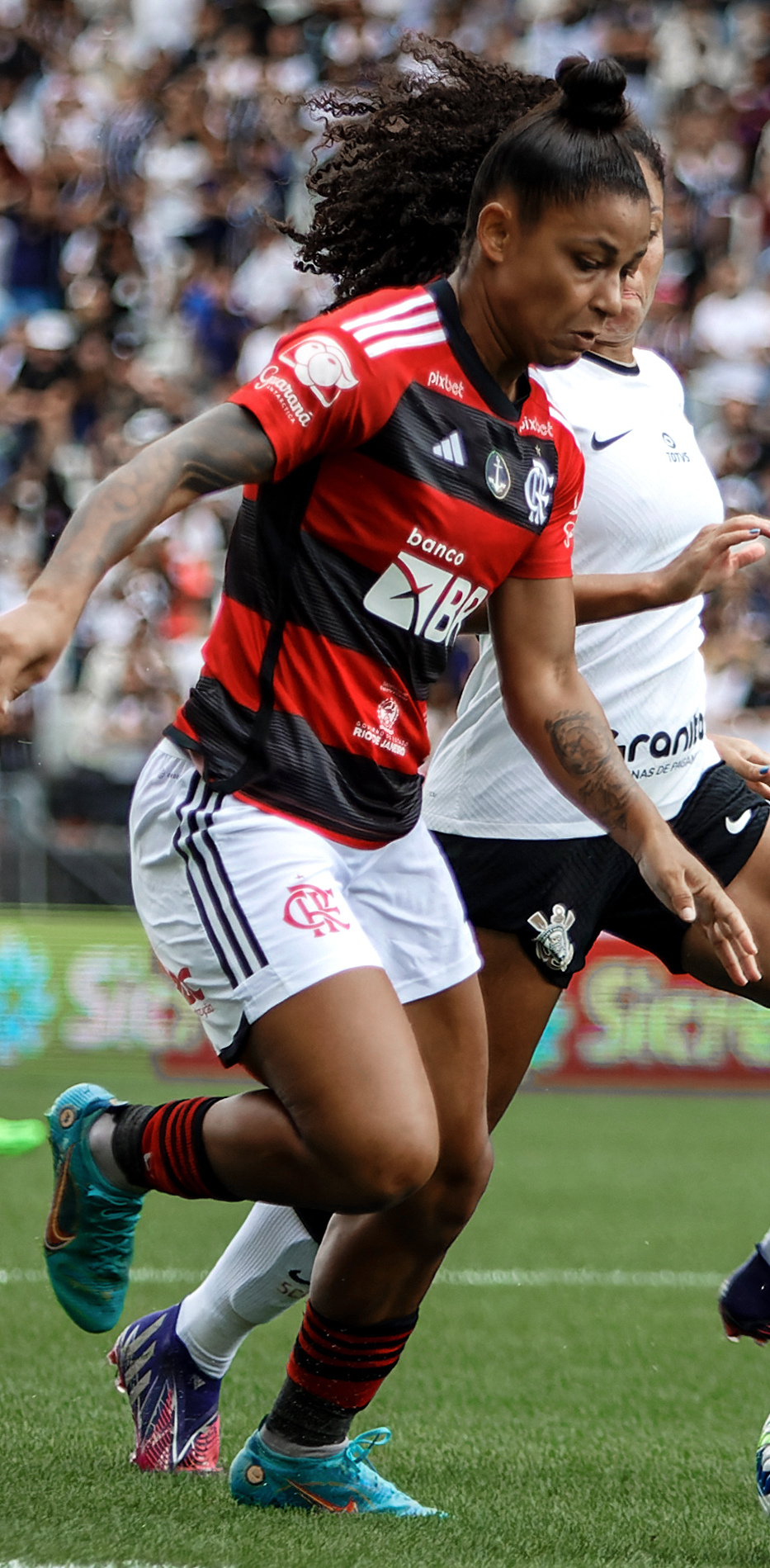
- Maria Alves with Flamengo in 2023

Personal information
- Full name: Maria Aparecida Souza Alves
- Date of birth: 7 July 1993 (age 33)
- Place of birth: Cristalândia do Piauí, Brazil
- Height: 1.63 m (5 ft 4 in)
- Position: Forward

Team information
- Current team: Fenerbahçe
- Number: 93

Senior career*
Years	Team	Apps	(Gls)
2010	ASCOOP		
2011	Ipatinga		
2011–2013	Vitória das Tabocas		
2013	Centro Olímpico	7	(0)
2014	São José	0	(0)
2015–2019	Santos	59	(10)
2019–2021	Juventus	28	(7)
2021	Palmeiras	11	(3)
2022–2023	Flamengo	10	(4)
2023	León	12	(4)
2024	Santos	10	(0)
2024–2025	Ankara BB Fomget	35	(3)
2026–	Fenerbahçe	20	(5)

International career^{‡}
2012	Brazil U20	3	(0)
2017–2019	Brazil	5	(0)
- * Club domestic league appearances and goals as of 4 May 2025(UTC) ‡ National team caps and goals as of 8 October 2019

Maria Aparecida Souza Alves (born 7 July 1993), usually known as Maria Alves and sometimes simply as Maria, is a Brazilian football forward who plays in the Turkish Super League for Fenerbahçe.

== Club career ==
=== Career beginnings ===
Born in Tabocal Grande, a small village near Cristalândia do Piauí, Piauí, Maria moved to Brasília at the age of 14 to pursue a professional career. She began her career with ASCOOP in 2010, and spent three months at Ipatinga before receiving an offer from Vitória das Tabocas in 2011.

=== Centro Olímpico ===
In 2013, Maria joined Centro Olímpico. She made her league debut against Tuna Luso on 23 October 2013.

=== Santos ===
Maria Alves joined Santos in 2015, after the women's team was reestablished. She scored on her league debut against Pinheirense on 9 September 2015, scoring in the 25th minute.

=== Juventus ===
On 3 September 2019, Maria moved abroad for the first time in her career, signing for Juventus. She made her league debut against Empoli on 14 September 2019. Maria Alves scored her first league goal against Florentia on 13 October 2019, scoring in the 70th minute.

=== Palmeiras ===
On 24 May 2021, she returned to her home country with Palmeiras. Maria Alves made her league debut against Flamengo on 31 May 2021. She scored her first league goal against Napoli on 21 June 2021, scoring in the 75th minute.

=== Flamengo ===
On 16 January 2022, Maria agreed to a contract with Flamengo. She made her league debut against São Paulo on 7 March 2022. Maria Alves scored her first goal for the club against CRESSPOM on 13 March 2022, scoring in the 90th+2nd minute.

=== León ===
On 17 August 2023, she was presented at Liga MX Femenil side León.

=== Santos ===
On 22 January 2024, Maria was announced back at her former club Santos on a one-year contract. She made her league debut against Real Brasília on 15 March 2024.

=== Ankara BB Fomget ===
In September 2024, Alves moved to Turkey, and signed a deal with Ankara BB Fomget to play in the 2024–25 Super League season. She won the champions title in that season.

== International career ==
Maria Alves represented Brazil at the 2012 FIFA U-20 Women's World Cup. She made her senior debut in 2017.

== Career statistics ==
=== International ===
As of 13 February 2024

National team	Year	Apps	Goals
Brazil	2017	3	0
Brazil	2019	2	0
Total		5	0

== Honours ==
Centro Olímpico

- Campeonato Brasileiro de Futebol Feminino: 2013

São José

- International Women's Club Championship: 2014
- Copa Libertadores Femenina: 2014

Santos

- Campeonato Brasileiro de Futebol Feminino: 2017
- Campeonato Paulista: 2018

Juventus

- Serie A: 2019–20, 2020–21
- Coppa Italia: 2018–19
- Supercoppa Italiana: 2019, 2020–21

Ankara BB Fomget

- Turkish Super League: 2024–25

Fenerbahçe

- Turkish Super League: 2025–26
