= Karen Hipólito =

Brazilian footballer (born 1993)

Personal information
- Full name: Karen Xavier Hipólito
- Date of birth: 25 February 1993 (age 33)
- Place of birth: São Paulo, Brazil
- Position: Goalkeeper

Team information
- Current team: Itabirito

Senior career*
Years	Team	Apps	(Gls)
2012	Portuguesa		
2013	São Bernardo	11	(0)
2013	Centro Olímpico	3	(0)
2014–2015	São Bernardo	22	(0)
2016	Corinthians	6	(0)
2017	Foz Cataratas	10	(0)
2017	Athletic-MG		
2018	Atlético Nacional		
2019	Audax	24	(0)
2019	Ceilândia	1	(0)
2020	Palmeiras	3	(0)
2021–2022	Minas Brasília	38	(0)
2023	Ferroviária	8	(0)
2024–2025	Santos	22	(0)
2026–	Itabirito	0	(0)
- * Club domestic league appearances and goals as of 19:11, 29 December 2025 (UTC)

Karen Xavier Hipólito (born 25 February 1993), known as Karen Hipólito, Kaká or just Karen, is a Brazilian footballer who plays as a goalkeeper for Itabirito.

== Club career ==
Born in São Paulo, Karen began her career with hometown side Portuguesa in 2012. She moved to Centro Olímpico in the following year, winning the first edition of the Campeonato Brasileiro de Futebol Feminino Série A1 with the club.

In 2016, Karen joined Corinthians, but featured rarely. She subsequently represented Foz Cataratas, Athletic-MG, Atlético Nacional, Audax and Ceilândia before being announced at Palmeiras on 5 January 2020.

Ahead of the 2021 season, Karen signed for Minas Brasília. She was a regular starter during his two-year spell at the club, but left on 22 December 2022.

On 3 January 2023, Karen was announced at Ferroviária. A backup to longtime incumbent Luciana, she joined Santos on 10 January 2024.

== International career ==
In October 2021, Karen was called up to the Brazil national team by head coach Pia Sundhage for two friendlies against Australia.

== Honours ==
Centro Olímpico

- Campeonato Brasileiro de Futebol Feminino Série A1: 2013

Ferroviária

- Copa Paulista de Futebol Feminino: 2023

Santos

- Copa Paulista de Futebol Feminino: 2024
- Campeonato Brasileiro de Futebol Feminino Série A2: 2025
