= Erikinha =

Brazilian footballer (born 1987)

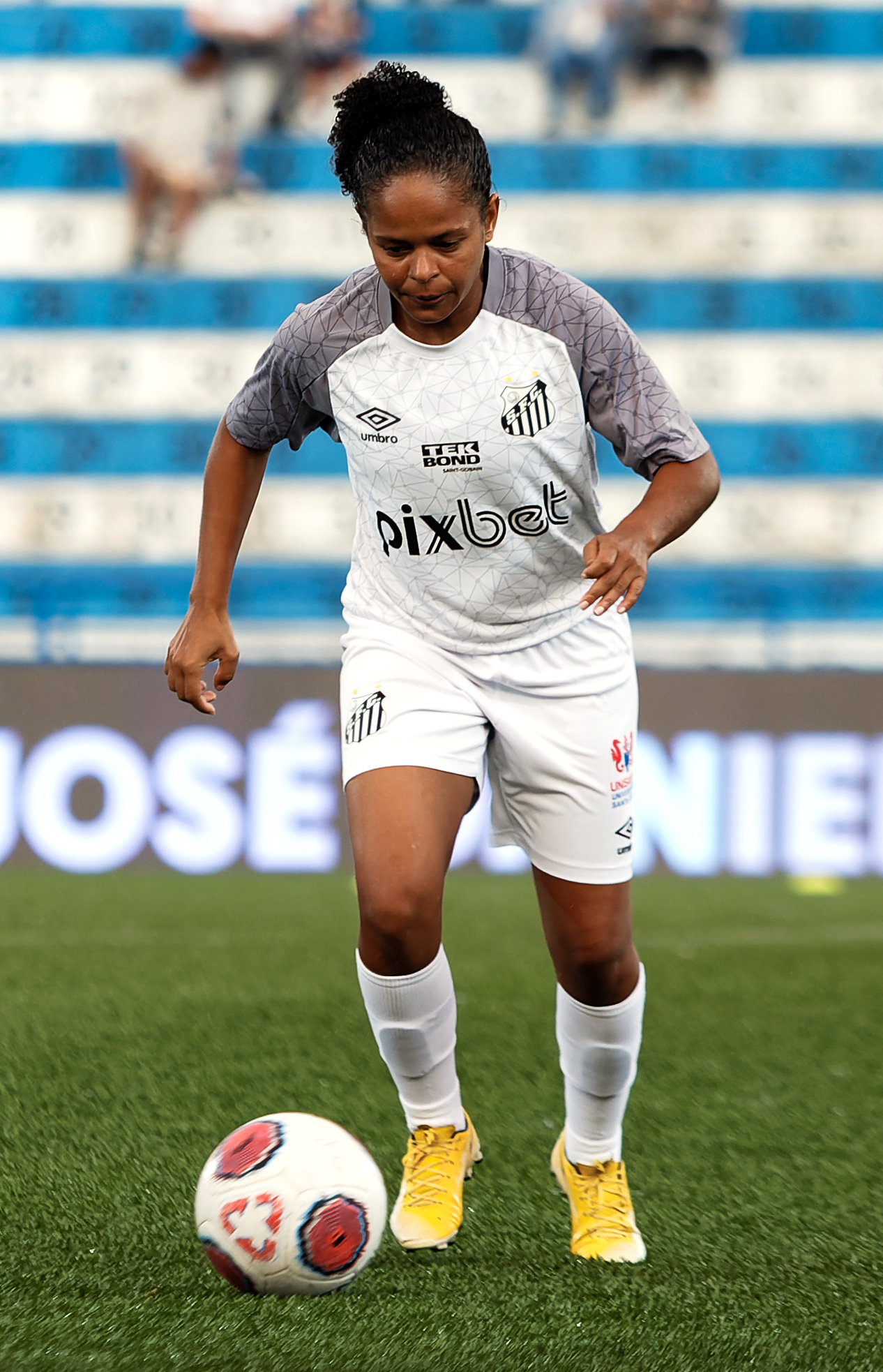

Personal information
- Full name: Erika Alves de Moura
- Date of birth: 23 November 1987 (age 38)
- Place of birth: São Paulo, Brazil
- Height: 1.52 m (5 ft 0 in)
- Position: Attacking midfielder

Team information
- Current team: Hapoel Hadera

Senior career*
Years	Team	Apps	(Gls)
2007–2011	Santos		
2012	Suwon FMC		
2013	Ferroviária		
2014	SKN St. Pölten		
2015	Ferroviária		
2015–2018	Santos	35	(2)
2019	Avaldsnes	4	(0)
2020–2024	Santos	36	(1)
2024–	Hapoel Hadera	0	(0)
- * Club domestic league appearances and goals as of 12:47, 29 July 2024 (UTC)

Erika Alves de Moura (born 23 November 1987), commonly known as Erikinha, is a Brazilian footballer who plays as an attacking midfielder for Israeli club Hapoel Hadera.

== Club career ==
Erikinha was born in São Paulo, and began his career with Santos in 2007. She left the club in December 2011 to move abroad, and joined South Korean side Suwon FMC for the 2012 campaign.

In 2013, Erikinha returned to his home country to join Ferroviária, but moved to Austria's SKN St. Pölten in the following year. In August 2015, after a period of trainings at São José-SP and another spell at Ferroviária, she returned to Santos.

On 11 December 2018, Erikinha and Santos teammate Brena moved to Norwegian side Avaldsnes IL. After featuring rarely, she returned to Peixe for a third spell on 20 January 2020.

On 19 July 2024, Erikinha terminated his contract with Santos; she left the club after playing for them in 326 matches, scoring 36 goals.

== Honours ==
Santos

- Copa Libertadores Femenina: 2009, 2010
- Copa do Brasil de Futebol Feminino: 2009
- Campeonato Brasileiro de Futebol Feminino Série A1: 2017
- Campeonato Paulista de Futebol Feminino: 2018
- Copa Paulista de Futebol Feminino: 2020

Ferroviária

- Campeonato Paulista de Futebol Feminino: 2013
