= Day Silva =

Brazilian footballer

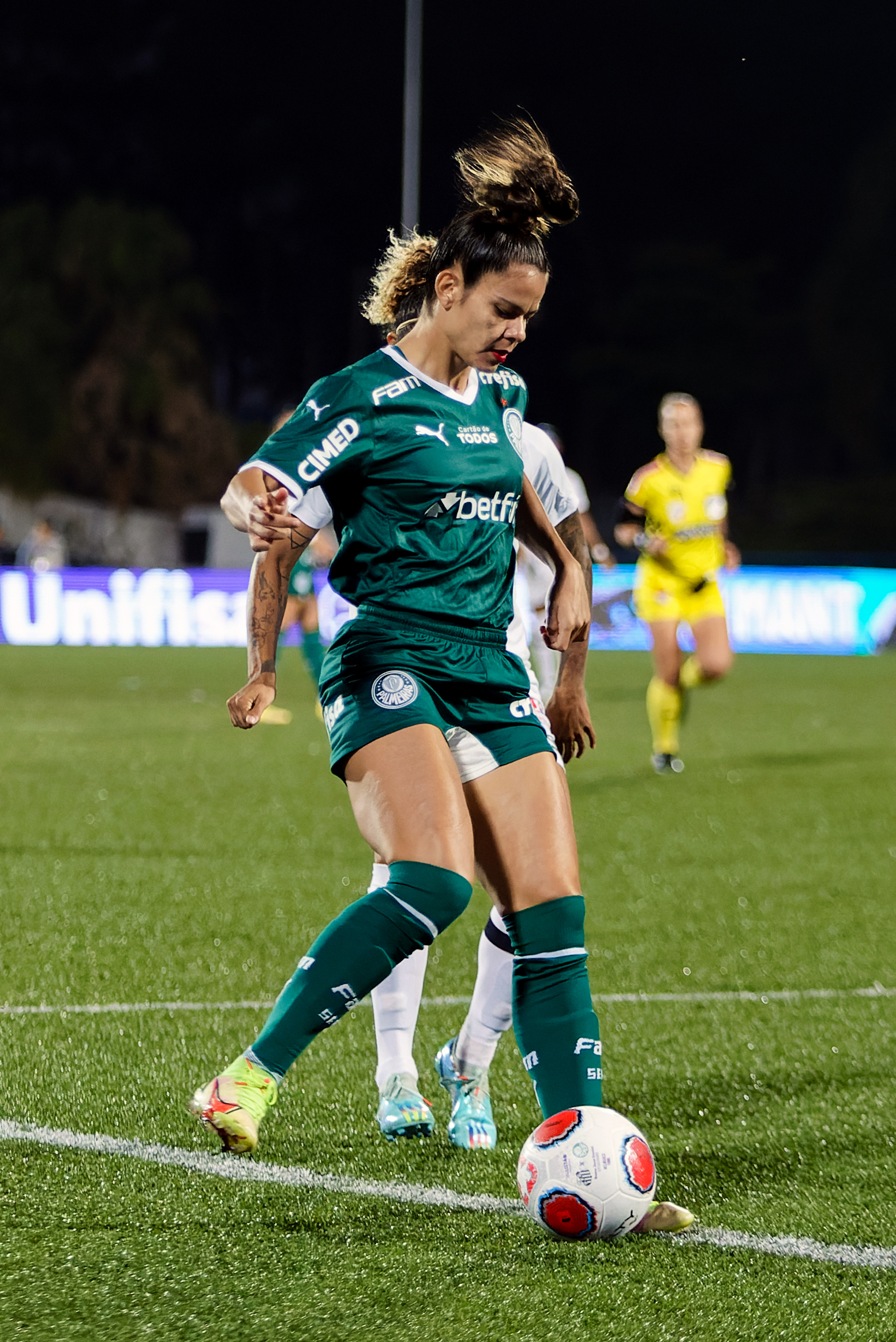
- Day Silva playing for Palmeiras in 2022

Personal information
- Full name: Daiana Serafim da Silva
- Date of birth: 20 October 1992 (age 34)
- Place of birth: Varginha, Brazil
- Height: 1.72 m (5 ft 8 in)
- Position: Centre back

Senior career*
Years	Team	Apps	(Gls)
2010	Atlético Mineiro		
- Duque de Caxias
- Botafogo
2015–2019	Flamengo	36	(2)
2020–2021	Santos	16	(1)
2022	Palmeiras	16	(0)
2023	Ferroviária	20	(0)
2024	Flamengo	11	(0)
2024	→ Santos (loan)	0	(0)
2025	São Paulo	0	(0)
2025	Monterrey	0	(0)

International career^{‡}
2022	Brazil	1	(0)
- * Club domestic league appearances and goals as of 10 September 2022 ‡ National team caps and goals as of 5 September 2022

Daiana Serafim da Silva (born 20 October 1992), known as Day Silva, is a Brazilian former professional footballer who played as a central defender for Liga MX Femenil club Monterrey.

== Club career ==
Born in Varginha, Minas Gerais, Day Silva played for amateur sides in her hometown before making her senior debut with Atlético Mineiro in 2010. She subsequently played for Duque de Caxias and Botafogo before joining Flamengo in 2015.

In January 2020, Day Silva moved to Santos. She spent a part of the 2021 campaign sidelined after being diagnosed with chikungunya, and left the club in December.

In January 2022, Day Silva joined Palmeiras, and won the 2022 Copa Libertadores Femenina with the club. She moved to Ferroviária on 1 January of the following year, before returning to Flamengo on 29 January 2024.

On 9 September 2024, Day Silva returned to Santos on loan until the end of the year. On 6 January of the following year, she joined São Paulo.

== Honours ==
Atlético Mineiro

- Campeonato Mineiro de Futebol Feminino: 2010

Flamengo

- Campeonato Carioca de Futebol Feminino: 2015, 2016, 2017, 2018, 2019
- Campeonato Brasileiro de Futebol Feminino Série A1: 2016

Santos

- Copa Paulista de Futebol Feminino: 2020, 2024

Palmeiras

- Campeonato Paulista de Futebol Feminino: 2022
- Copa Libertadores Femenina: 2022

Ferroviária

- Copa Paulista de Futebol Feminino: 2023

São Paulo

- Supercopa do Brasil: 2025
