= Cida (footballer) =

Brazilian footballer (born 1985)

Personal information
- Full name: Aparecida Santana de Lira
- Date of birth: 11 November 1985 (age 41)
- Place of birth: Surubim, Brazil
- Height: 1.67 m (5 ft 6 in)
- Position: Centre-back

Team information
- Current team: União de Natal

Senior career*
| Years | Team | Apps | (Gls) |
| 2005–2007 | Náutico | | |
| 2008–2010 | São Francisco do Conde | | |
| 2011–2014 | Vitória das Tabocas | | |
| 2015–2019 | Santos | 24 | (0) |
| 2020–2023 | Flamengo | 46 | (6) |
| 2024 | Santos | 7 | (0) |
| 2025– | União de Natal | 2 | (0) |
- * Club domestic league appearances and goals as of 14:17, 19 November 2025 (UTC)

Aparecida Santana de Lira (born 11 November 1985), commonly known as Cida, is a Brazilian footballer who plays for União de Natal. Mainly a centre-back, she can also play as a defensive midfielder.

== Career ==
Born in Tamanduá, a small village within the city of Surubim, Pernambuco, Cida began her career with Náutico and subsequently played for São Francisco do Conde and Vitória das Tabocas. In April 2015, she joined Santos as the women's team was reestablished.

On 24 August 2020, Cida signed a contract with Flamengo. On 23 January 2024, she returned to the Sereias da Vila on a one-year deal.

== Honours ==
Náutico

- Campeonato Pernambucano de Futebol Feminino: 2005, 2006

São Francisco do Conde

- Campeonato Baiano de Futebol Feminino: 2008, 2009, 2010

Vitória das Tabocas

- Campeonato Pernambucano de Futebol Feminino: 2011, 2012, 2013, 2014

Santos

- Campeonato Brasileiro de Futebol Feminino Série A1: 2017
- Campeonato Paulista de Futebol Feminino: 2018
- Copa Paulista de Futebol Feminino: 2024

Flamengo

- Campeonato Carioca de Futebol Feminino: 2021, 2023
- Copa Rio de Futebol Feminino: 2023
