= Grêmio FBPA (women) =

Women's football club based in Porto Alegre, Rio Grande do Sul, Brazil

Grêmio
- Full name: Grêmio Foot-Ball Porto Alegrense
- Nickname: Mosqueteiras
- Founded: 1983
- Ground: Arena do Grêmio
- Capacity: 55,225
- President: Odorico Roman
- Head coach: Jéssica de Lima
- League: Campeonato Brasileiro Série A1; Campeonato Gaúcho
- 2025 2025: Série A1, 11th of 16; Gaúcho, 1st of 5 (champions)
Home colours	Away colours

Grêmio Foot-Ball Porto Alegrense, commonly known as Grêmio or Mosqueteiras, is a Brazilian women's Association football club, based in the city of Porto Alegre, Rio Grande do Sul, Brazil. It is the women's section of Grêmio. They won the Campeonato Gaúcho de Futebol Feminino six times.

== History ==
Grêmio played their first match as a women's team in September 1983, and finished second in the year's Campeonato Gaúcho de Futebol Feminino. The club only returned to an active status in 1997, finishing third in the Gaúcho in that year.

After two runner-up achievements in 1998 and 1999, Grêmio won their first Gaúcho title in 2000, and achieved a second consecutive title in 2001. In 2002, after losing the Gaúcho title to rivals Internacional, the women's football section was closed.

After a period of inactivity, Grêmio re-opened their women's football section in 2017. They won the Gaúcho tournament in 2018.

In 2019, the team was promoted to the first division of the women's national championship with a victory over a América Mineiro in the quarterfinals. The team clinched a spot in the playoffs in 2020 and 2021, eliminated in both occasions on the quarterfinals.

== Players ==
=== Current squad ===
As of 13 April 2026.

Note: Flags indicate national team as defined under FIFA eligibility rules; some limited exceptions apply. Players may hold more than one non-FIFA nationality.

No.	Pos.	Nation	Player
1	GK	BRA	Raíssa
2	DF	BRA	Allyne
3	DF	ECU	Mayerli Rodríguez
4	DF	BRA	Day Silva
5	MF	BRA	Amanda Brunner
6	MF	COL	Daniela Montoya
7	MF	BRA	Camila Pini
8	MF	BRA	Drika
9	FW	BRA	Valeria Paula
10	FW	BRA	Brenda Woch
11	FW	ARG	Yamila Rodríguez
12	GK	BRA	Lucilene
13	MF	BRA	Leidiane
14	DF	BRA	Iza
15	MF	BRA	Iara
16	DF	PAR	Camila Arrieta

No.	Pos.	Nation	Player
17	FW	BRA	Luana Spindler
19	MF	BRA	Dudinha
20	DF	COL	Mónica Ramos
21	DF	BRA	Brito
22	DF	BRA	Camila Santos
27	DF	BRA	Dani Barão
30	MF	VEN	Kika Moreno
32	FW	BRA	Maria
44	DF	BRA	Emile
50	GK	BRA	Sol
52	FW	BRA	Julia Martins
77	FW	BRA	Gisele
80	MF	BRA	Rafa Marques
95	FW	BRA	Maria Dias
97	MF	BRA	Bia Santos
99	FW	BRA	Giovaninha

== Honours ==
=== Official tournaments ===
State
Competitions	Titles	Seasons
Campeonato Gaúcho	6	2000, 2001, 2018, 2022, 2024, 2025

=== Friendly tournaments ===
- Brasil Ladies Cup (1): 2024

=== Youth team ===
- Campeonato Brasileiro Feminino Sub-17 (1): 2023

== See also ==
- Grêmio FBPA
