= Associação Esportiva 3B da Amazônia =

Women's football club based in Manaus, Amazonas, Brazil

3B da Amazônia
- Full name: Associação Esportiva 3B da Amazônia
- Nickname: Onça da Amazônia
- Founded: 1 August 2017; 8 years ago
- Ground: Arena da Amazônia
- Capacity: 42,924
- President: Bosco Bindá
- Head coach: Bosco Bindá (caretaker)
- League: Campeonato Brasileiro Série A2; Campeonato Amazonense
- 2025 2025: Série A1, 15th of 16 (relegated); Amazonense, 1st of 7 (champions)
Home colours	Away colours

Associação Esportiva 3B da Amazônia, commonly known as 3B da Amazônia, is a Brazilian association football club, based in the city of Manaus, Amazonas. They won the Campeonato Amazonense de Futebol Feminino four times.

== History ==
Founded on 1 August 2017, the club started playing in the Campeonato Amazonense de Futebol Feminino in that same year, but lost the finals to Iranduba. In the following year, they reached the semifinals of the Campeonato Brasileiro de Futebol Feminino Série A2, narrowly missing out promotion, while also finishing second in the Amazonense.

3B lifted their first trophy in 2019, after winning the Amazonense and ending an eight-year run of Iranduba's dominance. They won the tournament again in 2021, They also finished second in the 2022 Campeonato Brasileiro de Futebol Feminino Série A3, returning to the second division, before winning the Amazonense again in 2023.

In the 2024 season, 3B finished second in the Brasileiro Série A2, achieving a first-ever promotion to the top tier, and won another Amazonense title, with president Bosco Bindá acting as caretaker head coach.

== Honours ==
=== Official tournaments ===
State
Competitions	Titles	Seasons
Campeonato Amazonense	5	2019, 2021, 2023, 2024, 2025
