= 2024 Sport Club Corinthians Paulista (women) season =

Corinthians (women) 2024 football season

Corinthians
2024 season
- President: Augusto Melo
- Manager: Lucas Piccinato
- Stadium: Parque São Jorge / Neo Química Arena
- Série A1: Winners
- Supercopa do Brasil: Winners
- Campeonato Paulista: Runners-up
- Copa Libertadores: Winners
- Top goalscorer: League: Victória (13); All: Victória (17)
- Highest home attendance: 44,529 vs São Paulo (22 September 2024)
- Lowest home attendance: 418 vs Taubaté (21 May 2024)
Home colors	Away colors	Third colors

The 2024 season was the 22nd season in the history of Sport Club Corinthians Paulista (women). In addition to the domestic league, Corinthians participated in this season's editions of the Supercopa do Brasil, Copa Libertadores Femenina and Campeonato Paulista. There was a mid-season break due to the 2024 Summer Olympics in July-August.

Corinthians was coming off a successful 2023 campaign by being the first South American women's club to win the continental treble after winning the league, Copa Libertadores Femenina, and Supercopa do Brasil. They also achieved the domestic quadruple with their Campeonato Paulista win.

It was also the first season since 2016 without Arthur Elias as the club's manager after he became Brazil women's national football team head coach at the end of last season. Longtime director Cris Gambaré also departed to coordinate the national team and was replaced by Iris Sesso, the former youth squad director.

== Background ==
=== Kits ===
- Home (2 May 2024 onward): White shirt with fading black sleeves and bottom, black shorts and white socks;
- Away (2 May 2024 onward): Black shirt, Black shorts and black socks;
- Third (27 August 2024 onward): black and white shirt, black and white shorts and black and white socks;

=== Previous kits ===
- Home (Until 1 May 2024): White shirt, black shorts and white socks with a yellow horizontal stripe;
- Away (Until 1 May 2024): Black shirt with white stripes, white shorts and black socks;
- Third (Until 26 August 2024): Yellow shirt, yellow shorts and yellow socks;

== Squad ==
As of 6 September 2024

Note: Flags indicate national team as defined under FIFA eligibility rules; some limited exceptions apply. Players may hold more than one non-FIFA nationality.

No.	Pos.	Nation	Player
1	GK	BRA	Nicole
2	DF	BRA	Letícia Santos
6	DF	BRA	Isabela
7	MF	COL	Gisela Robledo
8	MF	BRA	Vitória Yaya
9	FW	BRA	Jheniffer
10	MF	BRA	Gabi Zanotti
11	FW	BRA	Eudimilla
12	GK	BRA	Letícia
13	DF	BRA	Carol Tavares
14	FW	BRA	Millene
16	DF	COL	Daniela Arias
17	MF	BRA	Victória
18	FW	BRA	Gabi Portilho
20	MF	BRA	Mariza
21	DF	BRA	Paulinha

No.	Pos.	Nation	Player
22	FW	BRA	Fernanda
23	DF	BRA	Gi Fernandes
24	GK	BRA	Kemelli
26	MF	BRA	Nicole Marussi
27	MF	BRA	Duda Sampaio
28	MF	BRA	Ju Ferreira
30	FW	BRA	Jaqueline
32	GK	BRA	Rillary
37	DF	BRA	Tamires (captain)
40	FW	BRA	Jhonson (on loan from Toledo)
47	FW	BRA	Ellen
71	DF	BRA	Yasmim
77	FW	BRA	Carol Nogueira
80	GK	BRA	Mary Camilo
99	DF	BRA	Érika

== Managerial changes ==
On December 7, 2023, Lucas Piccinato was announced as the club's new manager after his contract with Internacional ended.

Manager	Signed from	Date of signing	Date of departure	Signed with	Source
(Brazil) Lucas Piccinato	(Brazil) Internacional	7 December 2023	—	—	

== Transfers ==
=== Transfers in ===
#	Position:	Player	Transferred from	Fee	Date	Team	Source
23	DF	(Brazil) Gi Fernandes	(Brazil) Santos	Free transfer (End of contract)	4 January 2024	First team	
11	FW	(Brazil) Eudimilla	(Brazil) Ferroviária	Free transfer (End of contract)	5 January 2024	First team	
8	MF	(Brazil) Vitória Yaya	(Brazil) Santos	Free transfer (End of contract)	5 January 2024	First team	
16	DF	(Colombia) Daniela Arias	(Colombia) América de Cali	Undisclosed	6 January 2024	First team	
1	GK	(Brazil) Nicole	(Brazil) Atlético Mineiro	Free transfer (End of contract)	6 January 2024	First team	
2	DF	(Brazil) Letícia Santos	(Germany) Eintracht Frankfurt	Free transfer (End of contract)	10 January 2024	First team	
7	MF	(Colombia) Gisela Robledo	(Colombia) América de Cali	Undisclosed	23 August 2024	First team	

=== Loans in ===
#	Position:	Player	Transferred from	Fee	Date	Team	Source

=== Transfers out ===
#	Position	Player	Transferred to	Fee	Date	Team	Source
7	MF	(Brazil) Grazi	Retired	End of contract	1 December 2023	First team	
5	MF	(Brazil) Luana	(United States) Orlando Pride	Free transfer (End of contract)	12 December 2023	First team	
2	DF	(Brazil) Katiuscia	(Brazil) Ferroviária	Free transfer (End of contract)	13 December 2023	First team	
4	DF	(Brazil) Giovanna Campiolo	(Brazil) Palmeiras	Free transfer (End of contract)	18 December 2023	First team	
8	MF	(Brazil) Diany	(Brazil) Palmeiras	Free transfer (End of contract)	20 December 2023	First team	
1	GK	(Brazil) Tainá	(Brazil) América Mineiro	Free transfer (End of contract)	22 December 2023	First team	
74	DF	(Brazil) Andressa	(Brazil) Ferroviária	Free transfer (End of contract)	2 January 2024	First team	
55	MF	(Brazil) Gabi Morais	Free agent	End of contract	9 February 2024	First team	
15	FW	(Brazil) Miriã	(Brazil) Cruzeiro	Free transfer (Rescinded contract)	15 April 2024	First team	
3	DF	(Brazil) Tarciane	(United States) Houston Dash	US$500,000 (~R$2,590,000)	23 April 2024	First team	
	FW	(Brazil) Miracatu	Free agent	End of contract	31 July 2024	Academy	

=== Loans out ===
#	Position:	Player	Transferred from	Fee	Date	Team	Source

== Statistics ==
=== Squad statistics ===
No.	Pos.	Name	Campeonato Brasileiro		Supercopa do Brasil		Campeonato Paulista		Copa Libertadores		Total		Discipline	
No.	Pos.	Name	Apps	Goals	Apps	Goals	Apps	Goals	Apps	Goals	Apps	Goals	Yellow card	Red card
1	GK	(Brazil) Nicole	12	0	0	0	3	0	4	0	19	0	1	0
2	DF	(Brazil) Letícia Santos	8 (4)	0	0	0	5 (5)	2	0	0	13 (9)	2	3	0
6	DF	(Brazil) Isabela	15 (1)	0	3	0	9 (2)	1	5 (1)	0	32 (4)	1	4	0
7	MF	(Colombia) Gisela Robledo	0	0	0	0	0 (2)	0	0 (5)	0	0 (7)	0	0	0
8	MF	(Brazil) Vitória Yaya	12 (8)	2	1 (2)	0	2 (6)	1	5	0	20 (16)	3	4	0
9	FW	(Brazil) Jheniffer	7 (7)	7	0 (3)	1	4 (2)	1	0 (2)	0	11 (14)	9	2	0
10	MF	(Brazil) Gabi Zanotti	0 (3)	0	3	1	5 (3)	1	4 (2)	5	12 (8)	7	3	0
11	FW	(Brazil) Eudimilla	5 (13)	1	0 (2)	0	5 (7)	3	2 (4)	3	12 (26)	7	0	0
12	GK	(Brazil) Letícia	0	0	0	0	4	0	2	0	6	0	0	1
13	DF	(Brazil) Carol Tavares	1 (3)	0	0 (2)	0	6 (2)	0	0	0	7 (7)	0	0	0
14	FW	(Brazil) Millene	13 (6)	4	3	1	6 (3)	2	5 (1)	1	27 (10)	8	3	0
16	DF	(Colombia) Daniela Arias	11 (3)	0	0	0	6	0	3 (2)	0	20 (5)	0	6	0
17	MF	(Brazil) Victória	18 (2)	13	0 (3)	0	8 (3)	3	3 (2)	1	29 (10)	17	5	0
18	FW	(Brazil) Gabi Portilho	15 (2)	1	3	1	7 (1)	0	2	0	27 (3)	2	2	0
20	MF	(Brazil) Mariza	20	2	3	1	10	0	5	0	38	3	10	0
21	DF	(Brazil) Paulinha	8 (4)	0	0	0	4 (7)	0	2 (2)	0	14 (13)	0	3	0
22	FW	(Brazil) Fernanda	3 (10)	2	0 (2)	0	6 (5)	4	0	0	9 (17)	6	2	0
23	DF	(Brazil) Gi Fernandes	2 (4)	0	0	0	4 (3)	2	0	0	6 (7)	2	1	0
24	GK	(Brazil) Kemelli	8	0	3	0	3	0	0	0	14	0	0	0
25	FW	(Brazil) Júlia Brito	0	0	0	0	0 (1)	0	0	0	0 (1)	0	0	0
26	MF	(Brazil) Nicole Marussi	0 (2)	0	0	0	0 (4)	0	0	0	0 (6)	0	0	0
27	MF	(Brazil) Duda Sampaio	16 (2)	6	2 (1)	1	8 (2)	3	5 (1)	1	31 (6)	11	3	0
28	MF	(Brazil) Ju Ferreira	16 (4)	0	3	0	11	1	3 (2)	2	33 (6)	3	5	0
30	FW	(Brazil) Jaqueline	13 (4)	4	3	1	5 (3)	3	3 (2)	1	24 (9)	9	1	0
31	MF	(Brazil) Manu Olivan	0	0	0	0	1 (1)	0	0	0	1 (1)	0	0	0
32	GK	(Brazil) Rillary	0	0	0	0	0 (1)	0	0	0	0 (1)	0	0	0
33	DF	(Brazil) Duda Cordeiro	0	0	0	0	1 (2)	0	0	0	1 (2)	0	0	0
37	DF	(Brazil) Tamires	9 (3)	2	0	0	3 (2)	0	0	0	12 (5)	2	1	0
40	FW	(Brazil) Jhonson	0	0	0	0	1 (2)	4	0	0	1 (2)	4	1	0
47	FW	(Brazil) Ellen	0	0	0	0	0 (3)	2	0	0	0 (3)	2	0	0
71	DF	(Brazil) Yasmim	7 (4)	1	3	0	9 (1)	0	5 (1)	1	24 (6)	2	2	1
77	FW	(Brazil) Carol Nogueira	2 (9)	2	0	0	5 (5)	2	4 (2)	0	11 (16)	4	2	0
80	GK	(Brazil) Mary Camilo	1	0	0	0	2	0	0	0	3	0	0	0
99	DF	(Brazil) Érika	7 (2)	3	0	0	10	1	4 (2)	1	21 (4)	5	2	1
Players transferred out during the season
3	DF	(Brazil) Tarciane	4	1	3	0	0	0	0	0	7	1	1	0

=== Goals ===
As of 20 November 2024

Rank	Player	BR	ScB	CPa	CL	Total
1	(Brazil) Victória	13	0	3	1	17
2	(Brazil) Duda Sampaio	6	1	3	1	11
3	(Brazil) Jaqueline	4	1	3	1	9
3	(Brazil) Jheniffer	7	1	1	0	9
5	(Brazil) Millene	4	1	2	1	8
6	(Brazil) Eudimilla	1	0	3	3	7
6	(Brazil) Gabi Zanotti	0	1	1	5	7
8	(Brazil) Fernanda	2	0	4	0	6
9	(Brazil) Érika	3	0	1	1	5
10	(Brazil) Carol Nogueira	2	0	2	0	4
10	(Brazil) Jhonson	0	0	4	0	4
12	(Brazil) Ju Ferreira	0	0	1	2	3
12	(Brazil) Mariza	2	1	0	0	3
12	(Brazil) Vitória Yaya	2	0	1	0	3
15	(Brazil) Ellen	0	0	2	0	2
15	(Brazil) Gabi Portilho	1	1	0	0	2
15	(Brazil) Gi Fernandes	0	0	2	0	2
15	(Brazil) Letícia Santos	0	0	2	0	2
15	(Brazil) Tamires	2	0	0	0	2
15	(Brazil) Yasmim	1	0	0	1	2
21	(Brazil) Isabela	0	0	1	0	1
21	(Brazil) Tarciane	1	0	0	0	1
Own goals		0	0	0	0	0
Total		51	7	36	16	110

=== Disciplinary record ===
N	P	Nat.	Name	BR			ScB			CPa			CL			Total			Notes
N	P	Nat.	Name	Yellow card	Second yellow card	Red card	Yellow card	Second yellow card	Red card	Yellow card	Second yellow card	Red card	Yellow card	Second yellow card	Red card	Yellow card	Second yellow card	Red card	Notes
99	DF	(Brazil)	Érika	1		1				1						2		1	
71	DF	(Brazil)	Yasmim	1		1				1						2		1	
12	GK	(Brazil)	Letícia												1			1	
20	DF	(Brazil)	Mariza	6			1			3						10			
16	DF	(Colombia)	Daniela Arias	4						2						6			
28	MF	(Brazil)	Ju Ferreira	3						3						6			
17	MF	(Brazil)	Victória	2						2			1			5			
6	DF	(Brazil)	Isabela	1			1			1			1			4			
8	MF	(Brazil)	Vitória Yaya				1			3						4			
27	MF	(Brazil)	Duda Sampaio	2						1						3			
10	MF	(Brazil)	Gabi Zanotti				1			2						3			
2	DF	(Brazil)	Letícia Santos	3												3			
14	FW	(Brazil)	Millene	1						1			1			3			
77	FW	(Brazil)	Carol Nogueira	1						1						2			
22	FW	(Brazil)	Fernanda	1			1									2			
18	FW	(Brazil)	Gabi Portilho				1						1			2			
9	FW	(Brazil)	Jheniffer	2												2			
21	DF	(Brazil)	Paulinha							1			1			2			
23	DF	(Brazil)	Gi Fernandes	1												1			
30	FW	(Brazil)	Jaqueline	1												1			
40	FW	(Brazil)	Jhonson							1						1			
1	GK	(Brazil)	Nicole										1			1			
37	DF	(Brazil)	Tamires	1												1			
3	DF	(Brazil)	Tarciane	1												1			

Ordered by (red card) , (second yellow card) and (yellow card)
(yellow card) = Number of bookings; (second yellow card) = Number of sending offs after a second yellow card; (red card) = Number of sending offs by a direct red card.

== Overview ==
Competition	First match	Last match	Starting round	Final position	Record							
Competition	First match	Last match	Starting round	Final position	Pld	W	D	L	GF	GA	GD	Win %
Série A1	18 March 2024	22 September 2024	Matchday 1	Winners	21	17	2	2	51	22	+29	80.95
Supercopa do Brasil	11 February 2024	18 February 2024	Quarter-finals	Winners	3	3	0	0	7	2	+5	100.00
Campeonato Paulista	21 May 2024	20 November 2024	Matchday 1	Runners-up	14	10	2	2	36	11	+25	71.43
Copa Libertadores	3 October 2024	19 October 2024	Group stage	Winners	6	5	1	0	16	1	+15	83.33
Total					44	35	5	4	110	36	+74	79.55

Source: Competitions

== Supercopa do Brasil ==
11 February 2024 Quarter-finals	Internacional	2–4	Corinthians	Porto Alegre
10:30 UTC−3	Priscila 12' (pen.), 22'	Report	Jaqueline 7'; Millene 26'; Gabi Portilho 42'; Jheniffer 90+4'	Stadium: Estádio Beira-Rio; Attendance: 3,595; Referee: Andreza Helena de Siqueira

15 February 2024 Semi-finals	Corinthians	2–0	Ferroviária	São Paulo
16:15 UTC−3	Mariza 27'; Gabi Zanotti 42'	Report		Stadium: Neo Química Arena; Attendance: 8,943; Referee: Thayslane de Melo Costa

18 February 2024 Finals	Corinthians	1–0	Cruzeiro	São Paulo
10:30 UTC−3	Duda Sampaio 47'	Report		Stadium: Neo Química Arena; Attendance: 33,424; Referee: Deborah Cecilia Cruz Correia

== Campeonato Brasileiro ==
Pos	Team	Pld	W	D	L	GF	GA	GD	Pts	Qualification or relegation
1	Corinthians	15	13	1	1	40	17	+23	40	Advance to Quarter-finals
2	Ferroviária	15	9	5	1	20	9	+11	32	Advance to Quarter-finals
3	São Paulo	15	9	3	3	35	15	+20	30	Advance to Quarter-finals
4	Palmeiras	15	9	1	5	35	17	+18	28	Advance to Quarter-finals
5	Cruzeiro	15	7	3	5	30	17	+13	24	Advance to Quarter-finals

Source: CBF

=== Results ===
18 March 2024 Match 1	Grêmio	0–3	Corinthians	Eldorado do Sul
20:00 UTC−3		Report	Millene 41' (pen.), 90+1'; Jheniffer 84'	Stadium: Estádio Aírton Ferreira da Silva; Attendance: Undisclosed; Referee: Ruthyanna Camila Medeiros da Silva

21 March 2024 Match 2	Corinthians	4–1	América Mineiro	São Paulo
19:30 UTC−3	Duda Sampaio 3'; Yaya 40'; Mariza 51'; Tarciane 62'	Report	Gadu 1'	Stadium: Parque São Jorge; Attendance: 1,168; Referee: Charly Wendy Straub Deretti

25 March 2024 Match 3	Flamengo/Marinha	2–3	Corinthians	Rio de Janeiro
20:00 UTC−3	Darlene 22'; Glaucia 90+5'	Report	Mariza 39'; Millene 78' (pen.); Gabi Portilho 88'	Stadium: Estádio Luso Brasileiro; Attendance: Undisclosed; Referee: Gleika Oliveira Pinheiro

29 March 2024 Match 4	Corinthians	3–0	Internacional	São Paulo
21:30 UTC−3	Duda Sampaio 39'; Yasmim 84'; Victória 90+6'	Report		Stadium: Neo Química Arena; Attendance: 11,890; Referee: Francielly Fernanda Lima de Castro

12 April 2024 Match 5	Santos	1–3	Corinthians	Santos
20:30 UTC−3	Ketlen 15'	Report	Victória 3'; Tamires 79', 90+3'	Stadium: Vila Belmiro; Attendance: Undisclosed; Referee: Andreza Helena de Siqueira

22 April 2024 Match 6	Corinthians	0–0	Ferroviária	São Paulo
19:00 UTC−3		Report		Stadium: Neo Química Arena; Attendance: 10,271; Referee: Ruthyanna Camila Medeiros da Silva

28 April 2024 Match 7	Corinthians	5–0	Fluminense	São Paulo
11:00 UTC−3	Érika 3', 17'; Duda Sampaio 25', 90+3'; Jheniffer 41'	Report		Stadium: Parque São Jorge; Attendance: 5,301; Referee: Gleika Oliveira Pinheiro

1 May 2024 Match 8	Atlético Mineiro	1–3	Corinthians	Belo Horizonte
16:30 UTC−3	Anny Marabá 90+1'	Report	Victória 57', 60'; Fernanda 69'	Stadium: Sesc Venda Nova; Attendance: 0 Referee: Maria Luiza Brandellero dos Santos

6 May 2024 Match 9	Botafogo	0–2	Corinthians	Rio de Janeiro
16:30 UTC−3		Report	Jheniffer 68'; Fernanda 90+3'	Stadium: Estádio Olímpico Nilton Santos; Attendance: Undisclosed; Referee: Cássia Franca de Souza

12 May 2024 Match 10	Corinthians	3–2	São Paulo	São Paulo
11:00 UTC−3	Jheniffer 15'; Victória 90+4'; Jaqueline 90+10'	Report	Mariana Santos 50'; Bia Menezes 64'	Stadium: Neo Química Arena; Attendance: 12,286; Referee: Andreza Helena de Siqueira

18 May 2024 Match 11	Corinthians	1–0	Real Brasília	São Paulo
21:00 UTC−3	Victória 82'	Report		Stadium: Parque São Jorge; Attendance: 1,006; Referee: Andressa Hartmann

9 June 2024 Match 12	Palmeiras	0–1	Corinthians	Jundiaí
18:30 UTC−3		Report	Jheniffer 58'	Stadium: Estádio Jayme Cintra (Note: Palmeiras played their home match at Estádio Jayme Cintra, Jundiaí instead of their regular stadium Allianz Parque, São Paulo.); Attendance: Undisclosed; Referee: Francielly Fernanda Lima de Castro
Note: The match was originally scheduled for 7 June, but it was postponed due to table adjustments.

17 June 2024 Match 13	Corinthians	4–2	Red Bull Bragantino	São Paulo
18:00 UTC−3	Victória 27', 38'; Eudimilla 54' (pen.); Yaya 83'	Report	Letícia Pires 82'; Gramaglia 90+1'	Stadium: Parque São Jorge; Attendance: Undisclosed; Referee: Gleika Oliveira Pinheiro

17 August 2024 Match 14	Cruzeiro	7–2	Corinthians	Nova Lima
11:00 UTC−3	Marília Furiel 5', 37', 47'; Sandoval 13'; Clara Consani 66'; Mariza 72' (o.g.); Vitória Calhau 83'	Report	Jaqueline 12'; Érika 17'	Stadium: Estádio Castor Cifuentes; Attendance: Undisclosed; Referee: Elizabete Esmeralda Cordeiro dos Santos Gomes
Note: The match was originally scheduled for 23 June, but it was postponed due to table adjustments related to the 2024 Rio Grande do Sul floods and the 2024 Summer Olympics.

21 August 2024 Match 15	Corinthians	3–1	Avaí/Kindermann	São Paulo
15:00 UTC−3	Victória 31'; Jheniffer 81', 84'	Report	González 3'	Stadium: Parque São Jorge; Attendance: Undisclosed; Referee: Andreza Helena Siqueira
Note: The match was originally scheduled for 27 June, but it was postponed due to table adjustments related to the 2024 Rio Grande do Sul floods and the 2024 Summer Olympics.

=== Knockout stages ===
24 August 2024 Quarter-finals	Red Bull Bragantino	1–1	Corinthians	Bragança Paulista
18:00 UTC−3	Jane Tavares 3'	Report	Jaqueline 37'	Stadium: Estádio Nabi Abi Chedid; Attendance: Undisclosed; Referee: Marianna Nanni Batalha

27 August 2024 Quarter-finals	Corinthians	1–0 (2–1 agg.)	Red Bull Bragantino	São Paulo
19:00 UTC−3	Victória 33'	Report		Stadium: Estádio do Canindé (Note: Corinthians played their home match at Estádio do Canindé, São Paulo instead of their regular stadiums Parque São Jorge or Neo Química Arena, São Paulo, which did not meet CBF requirements and was unavailable, respectively.); Attendance: 878; Referee: Daiane Muniz Dos Santos

1 September 2024 Semi-finals	Palmeiras	1–3	Corinthians	Jundiaí
10:45 UTC−3	Amanda Gutierres 37' (pen.)	Report	Victória 84'; Carol Nogueira 90+2'; Duda Sampaio 90+5'	Stadium: Estádio Jayme Cintra (Note: Palmeiras played their home match at Estádio Jayme Cintra, Jundiaí instead of their regular stadium Allianz Parque, São Paulo.); Attendance: 1,696; Referee: Andreza Helena de Siqueira.

8 September 2024 Semi-finals	Corinthians	1–2 (4–3 agg.)	Palmeiras	São Paulo
16:00 UTC−3	Duda Sampaio 25'	Report	Lais Estevam 9'; Letícia Ferreira 88'	Stadium: Estádio do Canindé (Note: Corinthians played their home match at Estádio do Canindé, São Paulo instead of their regular stadiums Parque São Jorge or Neo Química Arena, São Paulo, which did not meet CBF requirements and were unavailable, respectively.); Attendance: 15,867; Referee: Rejane Caetano da Silva

15 September 2024 Finals	São Paulo	1–3	Corinthians	São Paulo
10:00 UTC−3	Ariel Godoi 90+5'	Report	Millene 23'; Victória 49', 89'	Stadium: MorumBIS; Attendance: 28,420; Referee: Charly Wendy Straub Deretti

22 September 2024 Finals	Corinthians	2–0 (5–1 agg.)	São Paulo	São Paulo
10:00 UTC−3	Jaqueline 65'; Carol Nogueira 90'	Report		Stadium: Neo Química Arena; Attendance: 44,529; Referee: Daiane Muniz Dos Santos
Note: The attendance was a South American record for a women's club match.

== Campeonato Paulista ==
=== First stage ===
21 May 2024 1	Corinthians	4–1	Taubaté	São Paulo
19:30 UTC−3	Gi Fernandes 20'; Letícia Santos 47'; Eudimilla 63'; Jaqueline 90+3'	Report	Larisse 46'	Stadium: Parque São Jorge; Attendance: 418; Referee: Daiane Muniz dos Santos

24 May 2024 2	Red Bull Bragantino	1–3	Corinthians	Santana de Parnaíba
21:30 UTC−3	Debora 77'	Report	Duda Sampaio 26', 56'; Jaqueline 83' (pen.)	Stadium: Estádio Municipal Prefeito Gabriel Marques da Silva; Attendance: Undisclosed; Referee: Fernanda dos Santos Ignacio de Souza

5 June 2024 3	Corinthians	1–1	Santos	São Paulo
21:00 UTC−3	Ju Ferreira 17'	Report	Paola 35'	Stadium: Parque São Jorge; Attendance: Undisclosed; Referee: Gabriel Henrique Meira Bispo

21 June 2024 4	Pinda	1–5	Corinthians	Pindamonhangaba
15:00 UTC−3	Marcela 43'	Report	Jaqueline 30' (pen.); Isabela 73'; Jheniffer 76'; Fernanda 79'; Victória 90+3'	Stadium: Estádio Doutor Antônio Pinheiro Júnior; Attendance: Undisclosed; Referee: Marianna Nanni Batalha
Note: The match was originally scheduled for 19 June, but it was postponed due to table adjustments.

28 June 2024 5	São Paulo	1–2	Corinthians	São Paulo
18:00 UTC−3	Bia Menezes 4'	Report	Victória 22' (pen.); Eudimilla 83'	Stadium: Estádio do Canindé (Note: São Paulo played their home match at Estádio do Canindé, São Paulo instead of their regular stadiums Estádio Marcelo Portugal Gouvêa, Cotia or MorumBIS, São Paulo.); Attendance: Undisclosed; Referee: Daiane Muniz dos Santos
Note: The match was originally scheduled for 29 June, but it was anticipated due to table adjustments.

1 July 2024 6	Corinthians	2–1	Ferroviária	São Paulo
17:00 UTC−3	Eudimilla 35'; Letícia Santos 89'	Report	Neném 3'	Stadium: Estádio do Canindé (Note: Corinthians played their home match at Estádio do Canindé, São Paulo instead of their regular stadium Parque São Jorge, São Paulo due to the stadium's pitch maintenance.); Attendance: Undisclosed; Referee: Fagson Júnior dos Santos Silva

4 July 2024 7	Corinthians	1–2	Palmeiras	São Paulo
17:00 UTC−3	Millene 54'	Report	Lais Estevam 33'; Brena 53'	Stadium: Parque São Jorge; Attendance: Undisclosed; Referee: Guilherme Francisco Maciel da Silva e Rosário

13 August 2024 8	Realidade Jovem	0–4	Corinthians	São José do Rio Preto
21:30 UTC−3		Report	Carol Nogueira 53'; Fernanda 70'; Ellen 71'; Victória 90'	Stadium: Estádio João Mendes Athayde; Attendance: Undisclosed; Referee: Adeli Mara Monteiro

25 September 2024 9	Marília	0–5	Corinthians	Marília
17:00 UTC−3		Report	Fernanda 5'; Jhonson 68', 84', 88'; Carol Nogueira 74'	Stadium: Estádio Bento de Abreu; Attendance: Undisclosed; Referee: Marianna Nanni Batalha

29 September 2024 10	Corinthians	5–0	São José	São Paulo
11:00 UTC−3	Fernanda 22'; Jhonson 38'; Gi Fernandes 79'; Érika 86'; Ellen 89'	Report		Stadium: Parque São Jorge; Attendance: Undisclosed; Referee: Fernanda dos Santos Ignacio de Souza

=== Knockout stage ===
3 November 2024 Semi-finals	São Paulo	0–1	Corinthians	São Paulo
10:00 UTC−3		Report	Duda Sampaio 73'	Stadium: Estádio do Canindé (Note: São Paulo played their home match at Estádio do Canindé, São Paulo instead of their regular stadiums Estádio Marcelo Portugal Gouvêa, Cotia or MorumBIS, São Paulo.); Attendance: Undisclosed; Referee: Fagson Júnior dos Santos Silva

10 November 2024 Semi-finals	Corinthians	1–1 (2–1 agg.)	São Paulo	São Paulo
11:00 UTC−3	Millene 72' (pen.)	Report	Dudinha 27'	Stadium: Neo Química Arena; Attendance: 32,918; Referee: Marianna Nanni Batalha
Note: The match was originally scheduled for 9 November, but it was postponed due to table adjustments.

15 November 2024 Finals	Corinthians	1–0	Palmeiras	São Paulo
15:30 UTC−3	Gabi Zanotti 8'	Report		Stadium: Neo Química Arena; Attendance: 34,736; Referee: Edina Alves Batista

20 November 2024 Finals	Palmeiras	2–1 (2–2 agg.) (2–0 p)	Corinthians	Campinas
15:30 UTC−3	Amanda Gutierres 13'; Dudinha 42'	Report	Yaya 47'	Stadium: Estádio Brinco de Ouro (Note: Palmeiras played their home match at Estádio Brinco de Ouro, Campinas instead of their regular stadium Allianz Parque, São Paulo.); Attendance: Undisclosed; Referee: Daiane Muniz Dos Santos
	Penalties
	Amanda Gutierres (penalty missed); Fê Palermo (penalty scored); Ingryd (penalty scored)		(penalty missed) Duda Sampaio; (penalty missed) Eudimilla; (penalty missed) Millene; (penalty missed) Carol Nogueira

== Copa Libertadores ==
=== Group stage ===
Pos	Team	Pld	W	D	L	GF	GA	GD	Pts	Qualification
1	(Brazil) Corinthians (A)	3	2	1	0	11	1	+10	7	Quarter-finals
2	(Argentina) Boca Juniors (A)	3	2	1	0	4	1	+3	7	Quarter-finals
3	(Paraguay) Libertad (E)	3	1	0	2	2	4	−2	3	
4	(Venezuela) ADIFFEM (E)	3	0	0	3	1	12	−11	0	

Updated to match(es) played on 6 October 2024. Source: CONMEBOL
(A) Advance to a further round; (E) Eliminated

3 October 2024 Match 1	Corinthians (Brazil)	0–0	(Argentina) Boca Juniors	Asunción, Paraguay
17:30 UTC−4		Report		Stadium: Estadio Arsenio Erico; Attendance: Undisclosed; Referee: Dione Rissios (Chile)

6 October 2024 Match 2	Corinthians (Brazil)	8–0	(Venezuela) ADIFFEM	Asunción, Paraguay
17:30 UTC−3	Gabi Zanotti 4', 69'; Duda Sampaio 25'; Eudimilla 32' (pen.), 52', 55'; Ju Ferreira 36'; Yasmim 78'	Report		Stadium: Estadio Arsenio Erico; Attendance: Undisclosed; Referee: Elizabeth Tintaya (Peru)

9 October 2024 Match 3	Libertad (Paraguay)	1–3	(Brazil) Corinthians	Asunción, Paraguay
17:30 UTC−3	Martínez 57'	Report	Ju Ferreira 9'; Jaqueline 74'; Gabi Zanotti 83'	Stadium: Estadio Arsenio Erico; Attendance: Undisclosed; Referee: Dione Rissios (Chile)

=== Knockout stages ===
12 October 2024 Quarter-final	Corinthians (Brazil)	2–0	(Paraguay) Olimpia	Ypané, Paraguay
17:00 UTC−3	Gabi Zanotti 50'; Millene 52'	Report		Stadium: CARFEM Stadium (Note: This match was originally scheduled to be played at Estadio Arsenio Erico, Asunción, but CONMEBOL decided to move it to CARFEM Stadium, Ypané to protect the Arsenio Erico field due to heavy rains affecting Asunción.); Attendance: Undisclosed; Referee: Marcelly Zambrano (Ecuador)

15 October 2024 Semi-final	Corinthians (Brazil)	1–0	(Argentina) Boca Juniors	Luque, Paraguay
17:00 UTC−3	Gabi Zanotti 59'	Report		Stadium: CONMEBOL Stadium; Attendance: Undisclosed; Referee: Dione Rissios (Chile)

19 October 2024 Final	Corinthians (Brazil)	2–0	(Colombia) Santa Fe	Asunción, Paraguay
17:00 UTC−3	Victória 17'; Érika 65'	Report		Stadium: Estadio Defensores del Chaco; Attendance: Undisclosed; Referee: Nadia Fuques (Uruguay)

== See also ==
- List of Sport Club Corinthians Paulista (women) seasons
