= 2024 Copa Libertadores Femenina =

16th edition of the CONMEBOL Libertadores Femenina

Tournament details
- Host country: Paraguay
- Cities: Asunción, Luque and Ypané
- Dates: 3–19 October 2024
- Teams: 16 (from 10 associations)
- Venues: 4 (in 3 host cities)

Final positions
- Champions: (Brazil) Corinthians (5th title)
- Runners-up: (Colombia) Santa Fe
- Third place: (Argentina) Boca Juniors
- Fourth place: (Ecuador) Dragonas IDV

Tournament statistics
- Matches played: 32
- Goals scored: 88 (2.75 per match)
- Top scorer: Gabi Zanotti (5 goals)
- Best player: Gabi Zanotti

The 2024 Copa CONMEBOL Libertadores Femenina was the 16th edition of the CONMEBOL Libertadores Femenina (also referred to as the Copa Libertadores Femenina), South America's premier women's club football tournament organized by CONMEBOL. Although the competition was originally scheduled to be held in Uruguay from 3 to 19 October 2024, on 29 August 2024, CONMEBOL announced that the competition would be moved to Paraguay.

The defending champions Corinthians defeated Santa Fe (Colombia) 2–0 in the final to win their fifth title.

== Format ==
For the group stage, the 16 teams were drawn into four groups. Teams in each group played one another in a round-robin basis, with the top two teams of each group advancing to the quarter-finals. Starting from the quarter-finals, the teams played a single-elimination tournament.

== Teams ==
The 16 teams were:

- the champions of all ten CONMEBOL associations
- the title holders
- an additional team from the host association
- four additional teams from associations with the best historical performance in the tournament (associations in **bold** receive two berths according to the points total until the 2023 edition).
  1. Brazil: 280 points
  2. Chile: 156 points
  3. Colombia: 155 points
  4. Paraguay: 120 points
  5. Argentina: 108 points
  6. Venezuela: 80 points
  7. Ecuador: 68 points
  8. Uruguay: 54 points
  9. Bolivia: 41 points
  10. Peru: 39 points

Association	Team	Qualifying method	Participation	Previous best result
Argentina	Boca Juniors	2023 Torneo YPF and Copa YPF champions	9th	Runners-up (2022)
Bolivia	Always Ready	2024 Liga Femenina de Fútbol Boliviano champions	3rd	Group stage (2022, 2023)
Brazil	Corinthians (Brazil 1)	2023 Copa Libertadores Femenina champions	7th (Note: Corinthians won the 2017 title as a partnership with Audax. They created their own team for the 2018 season.)	**Champions** (2017, 2019, 2021, 2023)
Brazil	Ferroviária (Brazil 2)	2023 Brasileirão Feminino Neonergia runners-up (Note: As the title holders, Corinthians, were also the 2023 Brasileirão Feminino Neonergia champions, runners-up Ferroviária and third place Santos qualified as Brazil 2 and Brazil 3 berths, respectively.)	7th	**Champions** (2015, 2020)
Brazil	Santos (Brazil 3)	2023 Brasileirão Feminino Neonergia third place	5th	**Champions** (2009, 2010)
Chile	Colo-Colo (Chile 1)	2023 Campeonato Femenino SQM champions	11th	**Champions** (2012)
Chile	Santiago Morning (Chile 2)	2023 Campeonato Femenino SQM runners-up	5th	Quarter-finals (2019, 2020, 2022)
Colombia	Deportivo Cali (Colombia 1)	2024 Liga Femenina BetPlay DIMAYOR champions	3rd	Fourth place (2022)
Colombia	Santa Fe (Colombia 2)	2024 Liga Femenina BetPlay DIMAYOR runners-up	5th	Runners-up (2021)
Ecuador	Dragonas IDV	2024 Superliga Femenina Ecuabet champions	2nd	Group stage (2022)
Paraguay (hosts)	Olimpia (Paraguay 1)	2023 Torneo Clausura de Fútbol Femenino champions	3rd	Quarter-finals (2023)
Paraguay (hosts)	Guaraní (Paraguay 2)	2023 Torneo Clausura de Fútbol Femenino runners-up	1st	—
Paraguay (hosts)	Libertad (Paraguay 3)	2023 Torneo Clausura de Fútbol Femenino third place (Note: Libertad finished third in the 2023 Torneo Clausura de Fútbol Femenino as a partnership with Sportivo Limpeño. The partnership ended in 2023.)	5th (Note: The first four participations were in a partnership with Sportivo Limpeño.)	Group stage (2019, 2020, 2022, 2023)
Peru	Alianza Lima	2024 Liga Femenina Apuesta Total champions	3rd	Quarter-finals (2021)
Uruguay	Peñarol	2023 Torneo Rexona de Fútbol Femenino champions	4th	Group stage (2018, 2019, 2020)
Venezuela	ADIFFEM	2024 Liga FUTVE Femenina champions	1st	—

== Venues ==
Asunción, Luque and Ypané were selected by CONMEBOL as host cities. The group stage matches were played at the Estadio Arsenio Erico in Asunción and the CARFEM Stadium at the Centro de Alto Rendimiento de Fútbol Femenino in Ypané, each of which hosted two groups. The quarter-finals will be played at the Estadio Arsenio Erico and the CARFEM Stadium, the semi-finals and the third-place match at the CONMEBOL Stadium in Luque and the final at the Estadio Defensores del Chaco in Asunción.

Asunción	2024 Copa Libertadores Femenina is located in Paraguay	Asunción
Estadio Arsenio Erico	2024 Copa Libertadores Femenina is located in Paraguay	Estadio Defensores del Chaco
Capacity: 7,500	2024 Copa Libertadores Femenina is located in Paraguay	Capacity: 42,354
Ypané	2024 Copa Libertadores Femenina is located in Paraguay	Luque
CARFEM Stadium	2024 Copa Libertadores Femenina is located in Paraguay	CONMEBOL Stadium
Capacity: 5,000	2024 Copa Libertadores Femenina is located in Paraguay	Capacity: 4,000

== Match officials ==
On 18 September 2024, CONMEBOL announced the referees and assistant referees appointed for the tournament.

Association	Referees	Assistant referees
Argentina	Roberta Echeverría	Gisela Trucco; Carla López
Bolivia	Adriana Farfán; Alejandra Quisbert	Elizabeth Blanco; María Cabezas
Brazil	Charly Wendy Straub Deretti	Anne Kesy Gomes de Sá; Brígida Cirilo Ferreira
Chile	Dione Rissios	Marcia Castillo; Yomara Salazar
Colombia	Jenny Arias	Mayra Sánchez; Jenny Torres
Ecuador	Marcelly Zambrano	Viviana Segura; Stefanía Paguay; Marianela Ramírez
Paraguay	Zulma Quiñónez	Laura Miranda; Nadia Weiler
Peru	Elizabeth Tintaya	Mariana Aquino; Diana Ruiz
Uruguay	Nadia Fuques	Adela Sánchez; Sofía Sarzay
Venezuela	Stefani Escobar	Elibith Higuera; Thaity Dugarte; Francis García

== Draw ==
The draw for the tournament was held on 12 September 2024, 14:00 PYT (UTC−4), at the CONMEBOL Convention Center in Luque, Paraguay. The 16 teams were drawn into four groups of four.

Two teams were directly assigned to the head of groups A and B.

- To Group A: as 2023 Copa Libertadores Femenina champions, Corinthians (Brazil 1)
- To Group B: the champions of the host association, Olimpia (Paraguay 1)

The remaining teams (excluding the four teams from national associations with an extra berth) were seeded into three pots based on the final placement of their national association's club in the previous edition of the tournament, with the highest two (Brazil 2 and Colombia 1) placed in Pot 1, the next four (Chile 1, Paraguay 2, Argentina and Ecuador) placed in Pot 2 and the lowest four (Peru, Venezuela, Bolivia and Uruguay) in Pot 3. The four additional teams from associations with the best historical performance (Brazil 3, Chile 2, Colombia 2 and Paraguay 3) were seeded into Pot 4. From Pot 1, the first team drawn were placed into group C and the second team drawn placed into group D, both teams assigned to position 1 in their group. From each remaining pot, the first team drawn were placed into Group A, the second team drawn placed into Group B, the third team drawn placed into Group C and the final team drawn placed into Group D, with teams from Pot 2, 3 and 4 assigned to positions 2, 3 and 4 in their group. Teams from the same association could not be drawn into the same group.

Pot 1	Pot 2	Pot 3	Pot 4
(Brazil) Ferroviária; (Colombia) Deportivo Cali	(Chile) Colo-Colo; (Paraguay) Guaraní; (Argentina) Boca Juniors; (Ecuador) Dragonas IDV^{[1]}	(Peru) Alianza Lima; (Venezuela) ADIFFEM^{[1]}; (Bolivia) Always Ready; (Uruguay) Peñarol	(Brazil) Santos; (Colombia) Santa Fe; (Chile) Santiago Morning; (Paraguay) Libertad

^{1} The draw was held before the identities of Ecuador (Dragonas IDV) and Venezuela (ADIFFEM) representatives were known.

The draw resulted in the following groups:

Group A
Pos	Team
A1	(Brazil) Corinthians
A2	(Argentina) Boca Juniors
A3	(Venezuela) ADIFFEM
A4	(Paraguay) Libertad

Group B
Pos	Team
B1	(Paraguay) Olimpia
B2	(Chile) Colo-Colo
B3	(Bolivia) Always Ready
B4	(Brazil) Santos

Group C
Pos	Team
C1	(Brazil) Ferroviária
C2	(Ecuador) Dragonas IDV
C3	(Uruguay) Peñarol
C4	(Colombia) Santa Fe

Group D
Pos	Team
D1	(Colombia) Deportivo Cali
D2	(Paraguay) Guaraní
D3	(Peru) Alianza Lima
D4	(Chile) Santiago Morning

== Group stage ==
In the group stage, the teams were ranked according to points (3 points for a win, 1 point for a draw, 0 points for a loss). If tied on points, tiebreakers would be applied in the following order (Regulations Article 23).

1. Head-to-head result in games between tied teams;
  1. Points obtained in the matches played between the teams in question;
  2. Goal difference in the matches played between the teams in question;
  3. Number of goals scored in the matches played between the teams in question;
2. Goal difference in all group matches;
3. Goals scored in all group matches;
4. Number of red cards;
5. Number of yellow cards;
6. Drawing of lots.

The winners and runners-up of each group advanced to the quarter-finals.

All times are local, PYT (UTC−4) before 6 October 2024 and PYST (UTC−3) after 6 October 2024.

=== Group A ===
Pos	Team	Pld	W	D	L	GF	GA	GD	Pts	Qualification
1	(Brazil) Corinthians	3	2	1	0	11	1	+10	7	Quarter-finals
2	(Argentina) Boca Juniors	3	2	1	0	4	1	+3	7	Quarter-finals
3	(Paraguay) Libertad	3	1	0	2	2	4	−2	3	
4	(Venezuela) ADIFFEM	3	0	0	3	1	12	−11	0	

Source: CONMEBOL
3 October 2024
17:30

Corinthians (Brazil)	0–0	(Argentina) Boca Juniors
	Report

Estadio Arsenio Erico, Asunción
Referee: Dione Rissios (Chile)
3 October 2024
20:00

ADIFFEM (Venezuela)	0–1	(Paraguay) Libertad
	Report	Larrea 90+5'

Estadio Arsenio Erico, Asunción
Referee: Jenny Arias (Colombia)

6 October 2024
17:30

Corinthians (Brazil)	8–0	(Venezuela) ADIFFEM
Gabi Zanotti 4', 69'; Duda Sampaio 25'; Eudimilla 32' (pen.), 52', 55'; Ju Ferreira 36'; Yasmim 78'	Report

Estadio Arsenio Erico, Asunción
Referee: Elizabeth Tintaya (Peru)
6 October 2024
20:00

Boca Juniors (Argentina)	1–0	(Paraguay) Libertad
Palomar 76'	Report

Estadio Arsenio Erico, Asunción
Referee: Nadia Fuques (Uruguay)

9 October 2024
17:30

Libertad (Paraguay)	1–3	(Brazil) Corinthians
Martínez 57'	Report	Ju Ferreira 9'; Jaqueline 74'; Gabi Zanotti 83'

Estadio Arsenio Erico, Asunción
Referee: Dione Rissios (Chile)
9 October 2024
17:30

Boca Juniors (Argentina)	3–1	(Venezuela) ADIFFEM
Arias 37', 64'; Núñez 76'	Report	Flórez 49'

CARFEM Stadium, Ypané
Referee: Marcelly Zambrano (Ecuador)

=== Group B ===
Pos	Team	Pld	W	D	L	GF	GA	GD	Pts	Qualification
1	(Brazil) Santos	3	3	0	0	10	2	+8	9	Quarter-finals
2	(Paraguay) Olimpia	3	2	0	1	7	5	+2	6	Quarter-finals
3	(Chile) Colo-Colo	3	1	0	2	7	3	+4	3	
4	(Bolivia) Always Ready	3	0	0	3	0	14	−14	0	

Source: CONMEBOL
3 October 2024
17:30

Olimpia (Paraguay)	2–1	(Chile) Colo-Colo
González 47'; Peralta 55'	Report	Acevedo 15'

CARFEM Stadium, Ypané
Referee: Nadia Fuques (Uruguay)
3 October 2024
20:00

Always Ready (Bolivia)	0–5	(Brazil) Santos
	Report	Thaisinha 1'; Suzane Pires 5'; Ketlen 38'; Day Silva 49'; Salvatierra 58' (o.g.)

CARFEM Stadium, Ypané
Referee: Marcelly Zambrano (Ecuador)

6 October 2024
17:30

Olimpia (Paraguay)	3–0	(Bolivia) Always Ready
Peralta 8'; Varela 25'; Barbosa 44'	Report

CARFEM Stadium, Ypané
Referee: Stefani Escobar (Venezuela)
6 October 2024
20:00

Colo-Colo (Chile)	0–1	(Brazil) Santos
	Report	Ketlen 60'

CARFEM Stadium, Ypané
Referee: Jenny Arias (Colombia)

9 October 2024
20:00

Santos (Brazil)	4–2	(Paraguay) Olimpia
Carol Baiana 23'; Ketlen 39', 51'; Rafa Martins 80'	Report	Arce 9'; Peralta 89'

Estadio Arsenio Erico, Asunción
Referee: Nadia Fuques (Uruguay)
9 October 2024
20:00

Colo-Colo (Chile)	6–0	(Bolivia) Always Ready
Grez 3', 61'; Urrutia 10'; Acuña 51', 60'; Balmaceda 89'	Report

CARFEM Stadium, Ypané
Referee: Elizabeth Tintaya (Peru)

=== Group C ===
Pos	Team	Pld	W	D	L	GF	GA	GD	Pts	Qualification
1	(Colombia) Santa Fe	3	1	2	0	2	1	+1	5	Quarter-finals
2	(Ecuador) Dragonas IDV	3	1	1	1	3	2	+1	4	Quarter-finals
3	(Brazil) Ferroviária	3	0	3	0	4	4	0	3	
4	(Uruguay) Peñarol	3	0	2	1	2	4	−2	2	

Source: CONMEBOL
4 October 2024
17:30

Ferroviária (Brazil)	1–1	(Ecuador) Dragonas IDV
A. Zambrano 55' (o.g.)	Report	A. Zambrano 78'

Estadio Arsenio Erico, Asunción
Referee: Adriana Farfán (Bolivia)
4 October 2024
20:00

Peñarol (Uruguay)	0–0	(Colombia) Santa Fe
	Report

Estadio Arsenio Erico, Asunción
Referee: Zulma Quiñónez (Paraguay)

7 October 2024
17:30

Ferroviária (Brazil)	2–2	(Uruguay) Peñarol
Darlene 28'; Lelê 78'	Report	Carballo 42'; Larrea 81'

Estadio Arsenio Erico, Asunción
Referee: Dione Rissios (Chile)
7 October 2024
20:00

Dragonas IDV (Ecuador)	0–1	(Colombia) Santa Fe
	Report	Zamorano 24'

Estadio Arsenio Erico, Asunción
Referee: Roberta Echeverría (Argentina)

10 October 2024
18:30^{a}

Santa Fe (Colombia)	1–1	(Brazil) Ferroviária
Reyes 73' (pen.)	Report	Rafa Soares 33'

Estadio Arsenio Erico, Asunción
Referee: Zulma Quiñónez (Paraguay)
10 October 2024
18:30^{a}

Dragonas IDV (Ecuador)	2–0	(Uruguay) Peñarol
Litardo 51'; Bolaños 53'	Report

CARFEM Stadium, Ypané
Referee: Stefani Escobar (Venezuela)

Notes

a. The matches, originally scheduled for 17:30 local time, were delayed an hour due to rain.

=== Group D ===
Pos	Team	Pld	W	D	L	GF	GA	GD	Pts	Qualification
1	(Colombia) Deportivo Cali	3	3	0	0	8	2	+6	9	Quarter-finals
2	(Peru) Alianza Lima	3	2	0	1	6	2	+4	6	Quarter-finals
3	(Chile) Santiago Morning	3	1	0	2	5	7	−2	3	
4	(Paraguay) Guaraní	3	0	0	3	2	10	−8	0	

Source: CONMEBOL
4 October 2024
17:30

Alianza Lima (Peru)	2–0	(Chile) Santiago Morning
Lúcar 15'; Flores 65'	Report

CARFEM Stadium, Ypané
Referee: Charly Wendy Straub Deretti (Brazil)
4 October 2024
20:00

Deportivo Cali (Colombia)	2–1	(Paraguay) Guaraní
Landázury 1'; Guerra 62'	Report	Rodríguez 27' (pen.)

CARFEM Stadium, Ypané
Referee: Roberta Echeverría (Argentina)

7 October 2024
17:30

Deportivo Cali (Colombia)	2–1	(Peru) Alianza Lima
P. García 25'; Guerra 31'	Report	Rayane 83'

CARFEM Stadium, Ypané
Referee: Adriana Farfán (Bolivia)
7 October 2024
20:00

Guaraní (Paraguay)	1–5	(Chile) Santiago Morning
Sánchez 15'	Report	Rojas 3'; Navarrete 20'; Valencia 71', 85'; Henríquez 78'

CARFEM Stadium, Ypané
Referee: Marcelly Zambrano (Ecuador)

10 October 2024
21:00^{b}

Santiago Morning (Chile)	0–4	(Colombia) Deportivo Cali
	Report	Calvo 2'; Ibargüen 23' (pen.); Castellanos 34'; Muñoz 64'

Estadio Arsenio Erico, Asunción
Referee: Roberta Echeverría (Argentina)
10 October 2024
21:00^{b}

Guaraní (Paraguay)	0–3	(Peru) Alianza Lima
	Report	Lúcar 27', 54'; N. Romero 45+5' (pen.)

CARFEM Stadium, Ypané
Referee: Charly Wendy Straub Deretti (Brazil)

Notes

b. The matches, originally scheduled for 20:00 local time, were delayed an hour due to rain.

== Final stages ==
Starting from the quarter-finals, the teams played a single-elimination tournament. If tied after full time, extra time would not be played, and the penalty shoot-out would be used to determine the winners (Regulations Article 26).

=== Bracket ===
Quarter-finals
12 October – CARFEM Stadium
(Brazil) Corinthians	2
(Paraguay) Olimpia	0
12 October – CARFEM Stadium
(Brazil) Santos	0 (2)
(Argentina) Boca Juniors (p)	0 (4)
13 October – Estadio Arsenio Erico
(Colombia) Santa Fe	2
(Peru) Alianza Lima	0
13 October – Estadio Arsenio Erico
(Colombia) Deportivo Cali	0
(Ecuador) Dragonas IDV	3

Semi-finals
15 October – CONMEBOL Stadium
(Brazil) Corinthians	1
(Argentina) Boca Juniors	0
16 October – CONMEBOL Stadium
(Colombia) Santa Fe (p)	1 (4)
(Ecuador) Dragonas IDV	1 (2)

Final
19 October – Estadio Defensores del Chaco
(Brazil) Corinthians	2
(Colombia) Santa Fe	0
Third place
19 October – CONMEBOL Stadium
(Argentina) Boca Juniors	2
(Ecuador) Dragonas IDV	0

=== Quarter-finals ===
12 October 2024
17:00

Corinthians (Brazil)	2–0	(Paraguay) Olimpia
Gabi Zanotti 50'; Millene 52'	Report

CARFEM Stadium, Ypané (Note: To protect the Estadio Arsenio Erico field, the matches scheduled for 12 October at the Estadio Arsenio Erico were moved to the CARFEM Stadium and the matches scheduled for 13 October at the CARFEM Stadium were moved to the Estadio Arsenio Erico.)
Referee: Marcelly Zambrano (Ecuador)

12 October 2024
20:00

Santos (Brazil)	0–0	(Argentina) Boca Juniors
	Report
Penalties
Karla Alves (penalty scored); Day Silva (penalty missed); Rodríguez (penalty scored); Ana Carla (penalty missed)	2–4	(penalty missed) Masagli; (penalty scored) Sasaki; (penalty scored) Flores; (penalty scored) Núñez; (penalty scored) Cruz

CARFEM Stadium, Ypané
Referee: Stefani Escobar (Venezuela)

13 October 2024
17:00

Santa Fe (Colombia)	2–0	(Peru) Alianza Lima
Gaitán 22'; Torres 40'	Report

Estadio Arsenio Erico, Asunción
Referee: Roberta Echeverría (Argentina)

13 October 2024
20:00

Deportivo Cali (Colombia)	0–3	(Ecuador) Dragonas IDV
	Report	Bolaños 26', 29', 74' (pen.)

Estadio Arsenio Erico, Asunción
Referee: Nadia Fuques (Uruguay)

=== Semi-finals ===
15 October 2024
17:00

Corinthians (Brazil)	1–0	(Argentina) Boca Juniors
Gabi Zanotti 59'	Report

CONMEBOL Stadium, Luque
Referee: Dione Rissios (Chile)

16 October 2024
17:00

Santa Fe (Colombia)	1–1	(Ecuador) Dragonas IDV
Reyes 29'	Report	Roldán 2'
Penalties
Reyes (penalty scored); Motta (penalty scored); Gaitán (penalty scored); Hernández (penalty scored)	4–2	(penalty scored) Bolaños; (penalty scored) A. Zambrano; (penalty missed) Páez; (penalty missed) Riveros

CONMEBOL Stadium, Luque
Referee: Zulma Quiñónez (Paraguay)

=== Third place match ===
19 October 2024
15:45

Boca Juniors (Argentina)	2–0	(Ecuador) Dragonas IDV
Núñez 14'; Preininger 24'	Report

CONMEBOL Stadium, Luque
Referee: Stefani Escobar (Venezuela)

=== Final ===
Wendy Bonilla (Santa Fe) received a straight red card in the quarter-final and was ruled out of the semi-final and final.

19 October 2024
17:00

Corinthians (Brazil)	2–0	(Colombia) Santa Fe
Victória 17'; Érika 65'	Report

Estadio Defensores del Chaco, Asunción
Referee: Nadia Fuques (Uruguay)

Corinthians	Santa Fe

GK	1	(Brazil) Nicole
DF	6	(Brazil) Belinha
DF	99	(Brazil) Érika	(substituted off) 81'
DF	20	(Brazil) Mariza
DF	71	(Brazil) Yasmim
MF	8	(Brazil) Vitória Yaya
MF	27	(Brazil) Duda Sampaio	(substituted off) 76'
MF	17	(Brazil) Victória
MF	77	(Brazil) Carol Nogueira	(substituted off) 81'
FW	10	(Brazil) Gabi Zanotti (c)	(substituted off) 75'
FW	14	(Brazil) Millene	(substituted off) 62'
Substitutes:
GK	12	(Brazil) Lelê
DF	16	(Colombia) Daniela Arias	(substituted on) 81'
DF	21	(Brazil) Paulinha
MF	18	(Brazil) Gabi Portilho
MF	28	(Brazil) Ju Ferreira	(substituted on) 76'
FW	7	(Colombia) Gisela Robledo	(substituted on) 81'
FW	9	(Brazil) Jheniffer	(substituted on) 75'
FW	11	(Brazil) Eudimilla	(substituted on) 62'
FW	30	(Brazil) Jaqueline
Manager:
(Brazil) Lucas Piccinato

GK	12	(Venezuela) Yessica Velásquez
DF	38	(Venezuela) Leury Basanta
DF	3	(Colombia) Natalia Gaitán (c)
DF	4	(Colombia) Andrea Pérez
DF	6	(Colombia) Viviana Acosta
MF	10	(Colombia) María Camila Reyes	(yellow card) 87'	(substituted off) 90'
MF	5	(Venezuela) Micheel Baldallo		(substituted off) 68'
MF	19	(Colombia) Gabriela Huertas		(substituted off) 68'
FW	7	(Colombia) Mariana Zamorano
FW	25	(Colombia) María Paula Córdoba		(substituted off) 46'
FW	9	(Colombia) Karla Torres
Substitutes:
GK	1	(Colombia) Wendy Martínez
DF	14	(Colombia) Laura Tovar
DF	17	(Colombia) Cristina Motta
MF	16	(Colombia) Karen Hernández		(substituted on) 68'
MF	21	(Colombia) Katherine Valbuena		(substituted on) 90'
MF	26	(Colombia) Nicol Posada
FW	8	(Colombia) Nelly Córdoba		(substituted on) 46'
FW	11	(Colombia) Heidy Mosquera		(substituted on) 68'
Manager:
(Venezuela) Omar Ramírez

Final MVP Award:
Érika (Corinthians)

Assistant referees:
Adela Sánchez (Uruguay)
Sofía Sarzay (Uruguay)
Fourth official:
Roberta Echeverría (Argentina)
Fifth official:
Carla López (Argentina)
Video assistant referee:
Antonio García (Uruguay)
Assistant video assistant referees:
Gisela Trucco (Argentina)

Match rules

- 90 minutes.
- Penalty shoot-out if scores still level.
- Nine named substitutes.
- Maximum of five substitutions.

== Statistics ==
=== Top goalscorers ===
Rank	Player	Team	Goals
1	(Brazil) Gabi Zanotti	(Brazil) Corinthians	5
2	(Ecuador) Nayely Bolaños	(Ecuador) Dragonas IDV	4
2	(Brazil) Ketlen	(Brazil) Santos	4
4	(Brazil) Eudimilla	(Brazil) Corinthians	3
4	(Peru) Adriana Lúcar	(Peru) Alianza Lima	3
4	(Paraguay) Amada Peralta	(Paraguay) Olimpia	3
7	(Chile) Yenny Acuña	(Chile) Colo-Colo	2
7	(Argentina) Agustina Arias	(Argentina) Boca Juniors	2
7	(Chile) Javiera Grez	(Chile) Colo-Colo	2
7	(Colombia) Ingrid Guerra	(Colombia) Deportivo Cali	2
7	(Brazil) Ju Ferreira	(Brazil) Corinthians	2
7	(Argentina) Kishi Núñez	(Argentina) Boca Juniors	2
7	(Colombia) María Camila Reyes	(Colombia) Santa Fe	2
7	(Chile) Mary Valencia	(Chile) Santiago Morning	2

=== Final ranking ===
As per statistical convention in football, matches decided in extra time were counted as wins and losses, while matches decided by penalty shoot-out were counted as draws.

Pos	Team	Pld	W	D	L	GF	GA	GD	Pts	Final result
1st place, gold medalist(s)	(Brazil) Corinthians	6	5	1	0	16	1	+15	16	Champions
2nd place, silver medalist(s)	(Colombia) Santa Fe	6	2	3	1	5	4	+1	9	Runners-up
3rd place, bronze medalist(s)	(Argentina) Boca Juniors	6	3	2	1	6	2	+4	11	Third place
4	(Ecuador) Dragonas IDV	6	2	2	2	7	5	+2	8	Fourth place
5	(Brazil) Santos	4	3	1	0	10	2	+8	10 (Note: Points in quarter-finals: Santos 1, Olimpia 0, Alianza Lima 0, Deportivo Cali 0)	Eliminated in Quarter-finals
6	(Paraguay) Olimpia	4	2	0	2	7	7	0	6 (Note: Red cards in quarter-finals: Olimpia 0, Alianza Lima 1)	Eliminated in Quarter-finals
7	(Peru) Alianza Lima	4	2	0	2	6	4	+2	6	Eliminated in Quarter-finals
8	(Colombia) Deportivo Cali	4	3	0	1	8	5	+3	9 (Note: Goal difference in quarter-finals: Olimpia −2, Alianza Lima −2, Deportivo Cali −3)	Eliminated in Quarter-finals
9	(Chile) Colo-Colo	3	1	0	2	7	3	+4	3	Eliminated in Group stage
10	(Brazil) Ferroviária	3	0	3	0	4	4	0	3	Eliminated in Group stage
11	(Chile) Santiago Morning	3	1	0	2	5	7	−2	3	Eliminated in Group stage
12	(Paraguay) Libertad	3	1	0	2	2	4	−2	3	Eliminated in Group stage
13	(Uruguay) Peñarol	3	0	2	1	2	4	−2	2	Eliminated in Group stage
14	(Paraguay) Guaraní	3	0	0	3	2	10	−8	0	Eliminated in Group stage
15	(Venezuela) ADIFFEM	3	0	0	3	1	12	−11	0	Eliminated in Group stage
16	(Bolivia) Always Ready	3	0	0	3	0	14	−14	0	Eliminated in Group stage

Rules for classification: For 5th to 8th place. 1) Points in quarter-finals; 2) Goal difference in quarter-finals; 3) Goals scored in quarter-finals; 4) Fewest red cards received in quarter-finals; 5) Fewest yellow cards received in quarter-finals; 6) Fewest red cards received in all matches; 7) Fewest yellow cards received in all matches; 8) Drawing of lots (Regulations Article 24).
For 9th to 16th place. 1) Points in group stage; 2) Goal difference; 3) Goals scored; 4) Fewest red cards received; 5) Fewest yellow cards received; 6) Drawing of lots (Regulations Article 25).

== See also ==
- 2024 CAF Women's Champions League
- 2024 OFC Women's Champions League
- 2023–24 UEFA Women's Champions League
- 2024 Copa Libertadores
