= 2024 Supercopa do Brasil de Futebol Feminino =

2024 Supercopa Feminina
2024 Supercopa do Brasil de Futebol Feminino

Tournament details
- Dates: 9–18 February
- Teams: 8

Final positions
- Champions: Corinthians (3rd title)
- Runners-up: Cruzeiro

Tournament statistics
- Matches played: 7
- Goals scored: 17 (2.43 per match)
- Top goal scorer(s): Byanca Brasil; Priscila (2 goals each)

The 2024 Supercopa do Brasil de Futebol Feminino (officially the Supercopa Feminina Betano 2024 for sponsorship reasons) was the third edition of the Supercopa do Brasil de Futebol Feminino football competition. It was held between 9 and 18 February 2024.

Corinthians defeated Cruzeiro 1–0 in the final to win their third title.

== Format ==
The teams competed in a single-elimination tournament. All stages were played on a single-leg basis. In the event of a tie, a penalty shoot-out would be used to determine the winners. For the quarter-finals, the draw determined the home team, while for the semi-finals and final, the higher seeded team hosted the match.

Starting from the semi-finals, the teams were seeded according to their performance in the tournament. The teams were ranked according to overall points. If tied on overall points, the following criteria would be used to determine the ranking: 1. Overall wins; 2. Overall goal difference; 3. Overall goals scored; 4. Fewest red cards in the tournament; 5. Fewest yellow cards in the tournament; 6. Best 2024 Women's Club Ranking.

== Qualified teams ==
The competition was contested by 8 teams. The teams were chosen between the top twelve teams of the 2023 Campeonato Brasileiro de Futebol Feminino Série A1 and the top four teams of the 2023 Campeonato Brasileiro de Futebol Feminino Série A2 choosing only one team for state. If necessary, a state would gain a second berth according to its 2024 Women's State CBF Ranking position.

Teams in bold qualified for the competition.

Position (tournament)	Team	State	Status	Status (2nd berth)
Champions (Série A1)	**Corinthians**	São Paulo	Qualified	N/A
Runners-up (Série A1)	**Ferroviária**	São Paulo	Not eligible	Qualified
3rd place (Série A1)	Santos	São Paulo	Not eligible	Not eligible
4th place (Série A1)	São Paulo	São Paulo	Not eligible	Not eligible
5th place (Série A1)	Palmeiras	São Paulo	Not eligible	Not eligible
6th place (Série A1)	**Flamengo/Marinha**	Rio de Janeiro	Qualified	N/A
7th place (Série A1)	**Internacional**	Rio Grande do Sul	Qualified	N/A
8th place (Série A1)	**Cruzeiro**	Minas Gerais	Qualified	N/A
9th place (Série A1)	Grêmio	Rio Grande do Sul	Not eligible	Not qualified
10th place (Série A1)	**Avaí**	Santa Catarina	Qualified	N/A
11th place (Série A1)	**Real Brasília**	Distrito Federal	Qualified	N/A
12th place (Série A1)	Atlético Mineiro	Minas Gerais	Not eligible	Not qualified
Champions (Série A2)	Red Bull Bragantino	São Paulo	Not eligible	Not eligible
Runners-up (Série A2)	**Fluminense**	Rio de Janeiro	Not eligible	Qualified
3rd place (Série A2)	Botafogo	Rio de Janeiro	Not eligible	Not eligible
4th place (Série A2)	América Mineiro	Minas Gerais	Not eligible	Not eligible

2024 Women's State Ranking (2nd berth)
Rank	State
1	São Paulo
2	Rio de Janeiro
3	Rio Grande do Sul
4	Minas Gerais
5	Distrito Federal
6	Santa Catarina
7	Bahia
8	Ceará
9	Amazonas
10	Paraná
11	Pernambuco
12	Goiás
⋮
27	Rio Grande do Norte

Source:CBF

== Draw ==
The draw was held on 12 January 2024, 15:30 at CBF headquarters in Rio de Janeiro. The 8 qualified teams were drawn in a single group (2024 Women's Club Ranking shown in parentheses).

Group
- (São Paulo (state)) Corinthians (1)
- (São Paulo (state)) Ferroviária (2)
- (Rio Grande do Sul) Internacional (3)
- (Santa Catarina (state)) Avaí (7)
- (Rio de Janeiro (state)) Flamengo/Marinha (8)
- (Minas Gerais) Cruzeiro (10)
- (Federal District (Brazil)) Real Brasília (11)
- (Rio de Janeiro (state)) Fluminense (22)

== Bracket ==
Quarter-finals
(Rio Grande do Sul) Internacional	2
(São Paulo (state)) Corinthians	4
(Rio de Janeiro (state)) Flamengo/Marinha	0 (5)
(São Paulo (state)) Ferroviária (p)	0 (6)
(Santa Catarina (state)) Avaí	3
(Rio de Janeiro (state)) Fluminense	1
(Federal District (Brazil)) Real Brasília	0
(Minas Gerais) Cruzeiro	1

Semi-finals
(São Paulo (state)) Corinthians	2
(São Paulo (state)) Ferroviária	0
(Santa Catarina (state)) Avaí	0
(Minas Gerais) Cruzeiro	3

Final
(São Paulo (state)) Corinthians	1
(Minas Gerais) Cruzeiro	0

== Quarter-finals ==
Team 1	Score	Team 2
Real Brasília (Federal District (Brazil))	0–1	(Minas Gerais) Cruzeiro
Avaí (Santa Catarina (state))	3–1	(Rio de Janeiro (state)) Fluminense
Internacional (Rio Grande do Sul)	2–4	(São Paulo (state)) Corinthians
Flamengo/Marinha (Rio de Janeiro (state))	0–0 (5–6 p)	(São Paulo (state)) Ferroviária

=== Group A ===
10 February 2024
19:00

Real Brasília (Federal District (Brazil))	0–1	(Minas Gerais) Cruzeiro
	Report	Sandoval 29'

Bezerrão, Gama
Referee: Daiane Caroline Muniz dos Santos (São Paulo)

=== Group B ===
9 February 2024
20:00

Avaí (Santa Catarina (state))	3–1	(Rio de Janeiro (state)) Fluminense
López 34'; González 73'; Martínez 74'	Report	Débora Sorriso 53'

Estádio Hercílio Luz, Itajaí
Referee: Maria Luiza Brandellero dos Santos (Paraná)

=== Group C ===
11 February 2024
10:30

Internacional (Rio Grande do Sul)	2–4	(São Paulo (state)) Corinthians
Priscila 11' (pen.), 22'	Report	Jaqueline 7'; Millene 27'; Gabi Portilho 42'; Jheniffer 90+4'

Estádio Beira-Rio, Porto Alegre
Referee: Andreza Helena de Siqueira (Minas Gerais)

=== Group D ===
11 February 2024
10:30

Flamengo/Marinha (Rio de Janeiro (state))	0–0	(São Paulo (state)) Ferroviária
	Report
Penalties
Cristiane (penalty scored); Darlene (penalty scored); Gláucia (penalty scored); Daiane (penalty scored); Duda (penalty scored); Thaísa (penalty missed)	5–6	(penalty scored) Luana Sartório; (penalty scored) Mylena Carioca; (penalty scored) Katiuscia; (penalty scored) Patrícia Sochor; (penalty scored) Duda Santos; (penalty scored) Aline Gomes

Estádio Luso Brasileiro, Rio de Janeiro
Referee: Deborah Cecilia Cruz Correia (Pernambuco)

== Semi-finals ==
=== Semi-finals seedings ===
Pos	Team	Pld	W	D	L	GF	GA	GD	Pts	Host
2	(Santa Catarina (state)) Avaí	1	1	0	0	3	1	+2	3	Host
3	(Minas Gerais) Cruzeiro	1	1	0	0	1	0	+1	3	
1	(São Paulo (state)) Corinthians	1	1	0	0	4	2	+2	3	Host
4	(São Paulo (state)) Ferroviária	1	0	1	0	0	0	0	1	

Source: CBF

Team 1	Score	Team 2
Avaí (Santa Catarina (state))	0–3	(Minas Gerais) Cruzeiro
Corinthians (São Paulo (state))	2–0	(São Paulo (state)) Ferroviária

=== Group E ===
14 February 2024
19:00

Avaí (Santa Catarina (state))	0–3	(Minas Gerais) Cruzeiro
	Report	Byanca Brasil 45+1' (pen.), 59' (pen.); Mariana Pires 69'

Estádio Orlando Scarpelli, Florianópolis
Referee: Rejane Caetano da Silva (Rio de Janeiro)

=== Group F ===
15 February 2024
16:15

Corinthians (São Paulo (state))	2–0	(São Paulo (state)) Ferroviária
Mariza 27'; Gabi Zanotti 42'	Report

Neo Química Arena, São Paulo
Referee: Thayslane de Melo Costa (Sergipe)

== Final ==
=== Final seedings ===
Pos	Team	Pld	W	D	L	GF	GA	GD	Pts	Host
1	(São Paulo (state)) Corinthians	2	2	0	0	6	2	+4	6	Host
2	(Minas Gerais) Cruzeiro	2	2	0	0	4	0	+4	6	

Source: CBF

Team 1	Score	Team 2
Corinthians (São Paulo (state))	1–0	(Minas Gerais) Cruzeiro

=== Group G ===
18 February 2024
10:30

Corinthians (São Paulo (state))	1–0	(Minas Gerais) Cruzeiro
Duda Sampaio 48'	Report

Neo Química Arena, São Paulo
Attendance: 33,424
Referee: Deborah Cecilia Cruz Correia (Pernambuco)

Corinthians	Cruzeiro

GK	24	(Brazil) Kemelli Trugilho
DF	6	(Brazil) Belinha	(yellow card) 84'
DF	3	(Brazil) Tarciane
DF	20	(Brazil) Mariza
DF	71	(Brazil) Yasmim
MF	28	(Brazil) Ju Ferreira		(substituted off) 73'
MF	10	(Brazil) Gabi Zanotti (c)		(substituted off) 73'
MF	27	(Brazil) Duda Sampaio
MF	18	(Brazil) Gabi Portilho		(substituted off) 90+2'
FW	30	(Brazil) Jaqueline		(substituted off) 90+2'
FW	14	(Brazil) Millene		(substituted off) 79'
Substitutes:
GK	1	(Brazil) Nicole
GK	80	(Brazil) Mary Camilo
DF	2	(Brazil) Letícia Santos
DF	13	(Brazil) Carol Tavares
DF	21	(Brazil) Paulinha
MF	8	(Brazil) Vitória Yaya		(substituted on) 73'
MF	17	(Brazil) Victória		(substituted on) 73'
MF	23	(Brazil) Gi Fernandes
FW	9	(Brazil) Jheniffer		(substituted on) 79'
FW	11	(Brazil) Eudimilla		(substituted on) 90+2'
FW	15	(Brazil) Miriã
FW	22	(Brazil) Fernandinha		(substituted on) 90+2'
Coach:
(Brazil) Lucas Piccinato

GK	31	(Brazil) Taty Amaro
DF	16	(Paraguay) Limpia Fretes
DF	14	(Brazil) Camila Ambrózio (c)
DF	33	(Brazil) Vitória Calhau
DF	6	(Brazil) Ana Clara	(yellow card) 22'	(substituted off) 83'
MF	99	(Brazil) Paloma		(substituted off) 65'
MF	8	(Brazil) Rafa Andrade		(substituted off) 83'
MF	18	(Brazil) Maiara Lisboa		(substituted off) 65'
FW	17	(Paraguay) Fabiola Sandoval		(substituted off) 90+2'
FW	10	(Brazil) Byanca Brasil
FW	20	(Brazil) Marília
Substitutes:
GK	1	(Brazil) Luana Guitarrari
GK	42	(Brazil) Jully
DF	2	(Brazil) Isa Fernandes	(yellow card) 90+1'	(substituted on) 83'
DF	3	(Uruguay) Daiana Farías
MF	13	(Brazil) Rebeca		(substituted on) 83'
MF	23	(Brazil) Carol Soares
MF	26	(Brazil) Luaninha
MF	27	(Brazil) Mariana Pires		(substituted on) 65'
MF	95	(Brazil) Gaby Soares		(substituted on) 65'
FW	9	(Brazil) Luana Índia
FW	19	(Brazil) Fernanda Tipa		(substituted on) 90+2'
Coach:
(Brazil) Jonas Urias

Assistant referees:
Bárbara Roberta da Costa Loiola (Paraná)
Maíra Mastella Moreira (Rio Grande do Sul)
Fourth official:
Adeli Mara Monteiro (São Paulo)
Fifth official:
Juliana Vicentin Esteves (São Paulo)
Video assistant referee:
Pablo Ramon Gonçalves Pinheiro (Rio Grande do Norte)
Assistant video assistant referees:
Andrea Izaura Maffra Marcelino (Rio de Janeiro)

Match rules

- 90 minutes.
- Penalty shoot-out if scores still level.
- Twelve named substitutes.
- Maximum of five substitutions.
