= 2024 Colombian Women's Football League =

Liga Femenina BetPlay DIMAYOR
- Season: 2024
- Dates: 16 February – 16 August 2024
- Champions: Deportivo Cali (2nd title)
- Copa Libertadores Femenina: Deportivo Cali; Santa Fe
- Matches: 131
- Goals: 340 (2.6 per match)
- Top goalscorer: Estefanía González; Marcela Restrepo (10 goals each)
- Biggest home win: Atlético Nacional 8–0 R. Santander (23 March)
- Biggest away win: Santa Fe 0–4 Atlético Nacional (21 February); Junior 2–6 América de Cali (4 May)
- Highest scoring: Atlético Nacional 8–0 R. Santander (23 March); Junior 2–6 América de Cali (4 May)

The 2024 Colombian Women's Football League (officially known as the Liga Femenina BetPlay DIMAYOR 2024 for sponsorship purposes) was the eighth season of Colombia's women's football league. The season began on 16 February and ended on 16 August 2024.

Deportivo Cali won their second title in the competition, defeating the defending champions Santa Fe in the season's double-legged final by a 4–1 aggregate score.

== Format ==
For this season the competition was played in three stages, with a similar structure to the men's league Categoría Primera A and introducing the semi-final groups (cuadrangulares) for the first time in the women's competition. In the first stage, the 15 participating teams played a single round-robin tournament with all teams playing each other once and having a bye day, for a total of 14 matches for each team and 15 rounds in the first stage. The top eight teams advanced to the semi-finals in which they were drawn into two groups of four teams, with each team playing the others in their group twice. The winners of each semi-final group then played a double-legged final series to decide the league champions. The champions and runners-up qualified for the Copa Libertadores Femenina.

== Teams ==
15 DIMAYOR affiliate clubs took part in the competition with their women's teams, 12 of which participated in the previous season. Atlético Bucaramanga, Atlético Huila, and Boyacá Chicó did not enter this edition of the tournament, whilst Cortuluá was replaced by its successor club Internacional and Deportes Tolima joined an alliance with Real Santander for this season. Cúcuta Deportivo returned to the competition after five years, having competed for the last time in 2019, and Alianza took part for the first time, having its women's team based in Yumbo, Valle del Cauca Department for this season. Once Caldas, which had expressed interest in participating, ultimately declined to compete due to financial reasons.

=== Stadia and locations ===
Locations of the 2024 Liga Femenina teams

Team	City	Stadium	Capacity
Alianza	Yumbo	Municipal Raúl Miranda	3,500
América de Cali	Cali	Pascual Guerrero	38,588
Atlético Nacional	Medellín	Atanasio Girardot	44,863
Cúcuta Deportivo	Cúcuta	General Santander	42,901
Deportivo Cali	Palmira	Deportivo Cali	44,000
Deportivo Pasto	Pasto	Departamental Libertad	20,000
Deportivo Pereira	Pereira	Hernán Ramírez Villegas	30,297
Independiente Medellín	Itagüí	Metropolitano Ciudad de Itagüí	12,000
Internacional	Palmira	Francisco Rivera Escobar	15,300
Junior	Barranquilla	Romelio Martínez	11,000
La Equidad	Bogotá	Metropolitano de Techo	10,000
Llaneros	Yopal (Note: Based in Villavicencio but playing its home games in Yopal.)	Santiago de las Atalayas	10,000
Millonarios	Bogotá	Nemesio Camacho El Campín	39,512
Real Santander (Note: In association with Deportes Tolima.)	Piedecuesta	Villa Concha	5,500
Santa Fe	Bogotá	Nemesio Camacho El Campín	39,512

== First stage ==
The first stage started on 16 February and consisted of a single-round robin tournament with the 15 participating teams playing each other once. The top eight teams advanced to the semi-finals.

=== Standings ===
Pos	Team	Pld	W	D	L	GF	GA	GD	Pts	Qualification
1	Atlético Nacional	14	10	4	0	40	6	+34	34	Advance to the semi-finals
2	América de Cali	14	10	3	1	34	11	+23	33	Advance to the semi-finals
3	Santa Fe	14	8	3	3	17	13	+4	27	Advance to the semi-finals
4	Deportivo Cali	14	7	5	2	16	8	+8	26	Advance to the semi-finals
5	Millonarios	14	6	6	2	17	10	+7	24	Advance to the semi-finals
6	Alianza	14	6	4	4	13	14	−1	22	Advance to the semi-finals
7	Llaneros	14	6	2	6	11	15	−4	20	Advance to the semi-finals
8	Independiente Medellín	14	5	4	5	22	16	+6	19	Advance to the semi-finals
9	La Equidad	14	5	4	5	23	19	+4	19	
10	Internacional	14	6	1	7	17	19	−2	19	
11	Deportivo Pasto	14	5	2	7	14	17	−3	17	
12	Cúcuta Deportivo	14	3	5	6	10	18	−8	14	
13	Deportivo Pereira	14	3	0	11	10	32	−22	9	
14	Real Santander	14	1	3	10	15	38	−23	6	
15	Junior	14	0	2	12	9	32	−23	2	

Source: Dimayor, Soccerway
Rules for classification: 1) Points, 2) Goal difference, 3) Goals for, 4) Away goals for, 5) Away goals against, 6) Yellow cards, 7) Red cards, 8) Drawing of lots.

=== Results ===
Home \ Away	ALI	AME	NAC	CUC	CAL	PAS	PER	DIM	INT	JUN	EQU	LLA	MIL	RSA	SFE
Alianza	—	1–0	0–2	—	1–0	—	—	—	1–0	0–0	—	—	1–1	3–2	—
América de Cali	—	—	1–1	—	2–1	—	5–0	—	1–0	—	—	3–0 (Note: Match awarded 3–0 to América de Cali due to the Llaneros players withdrawing from the field in protest for a goal scored by América de Cali. The match was abandoned at the 60th minute with América de Cali leading 1–0.)	1–0	4–0	—
Atlético Nacional	—	—	—	6–0	1–1	—	6–0	—	1–0	—	—	0–0	4–0	8–0	—
Cúcuta Deportivo	0–0	1–2	—	—	—	2–1	—	0–0	—	1–1	1–0	—	—	—	0–0
Deportivo Cali	—	—	—	1–0	—	1–0	2–0	—	—	—	1–1	3–0	0–0	—	1–0
Deportivo Pasto	2–2	0–3	1–1	—	—	—	—	1–0	2–3	1–0	—	—	—	2–0	—
Deportivo Pereira	0–1	—	—	2–1	—	0–2	—	1–4	—	—	1–3	1–2	—	—	1–2
Independiente Medellín	2–0	2–3	3–4	—	1–1	—	—	—	2–1	4–0	—	—	—	3–1	—
Internacional	—	—	—	3–0	1–2	—	2–1	—	—	—	—	2–0	0–0	3–2	1–3
Junior	—	2–6	0–1	—	0–1	—	0–1	—	0–1	—	—	—	0–3	1–3	—
La Equidad	4–2	1–1	0–1	—	—	1–2	—	1–1	4–0	4–3	—	—	—	—	—
Llaneros	0–1	—	—	1–0	—	1–0	—	1–0	—	3–0	2–0	—	—	—	0–1
Millonarios	—	—	—	1–1	—	2–0	1–0	0–0	—	—	3–1	3–0	—	—	1–0
Real Santander	—	—	—	0–3	1–1	—	1–2	—	—	—	1–3	1–1	2–2	—	1–2
Santa Fe	1–0	2–2	0–4	—	—	1–0	—	2–0	—	3–2	0–0	—	—	—	—

Source: Dimayor, Soccerway
Legend: Blue = home team win; Yellow = draw; Red = away team win.

== Semi-finals ==
The eight teams that advanced to the semi-finals were drawn into two groups of four teams, with the top two teams from the first stage being seeded in each group. The two group winners advanced to the finals and also qualified for the 2024 Copa Libertadores Femenina.

=== Group A ===
Pos	Team	Pld	W	D	L	GF	GA	GD	Pts	Qualification	SFE	NAC	ALI	DIM
1	Santa Fe	6	4	1	1	11	7	+4	13	Finals and qualification for Copa Libertadores Femenina	—	1–1	2–0	3–1
2	Atlético Nacional	6	2	3	1	9	7	+2	9		2–0	—	1–1	2–2
3	Alianza	6	2	1	3	8	9	−1	7		2–3	2–1	—	1–2
4	Independiente Medellín	6	1	1	4	7	12	−5	4		1–2	1–2	0–2	—

Source: Dimayor, Soccerway
Legend: Blue = home team win; Yellow = draw; Red = away team win.
Rules for classification: 1) Points, 2) First stage position (only applies for the seeded team, if it is involved in a tie), 3) Goal difference, 4) Goals for, 5) Away goals for, 6) Away goals against, 7) Yellow cards, 8) Red cards, 9) First stage position.

=== Group B ===
Pos	Team	Pld	W	D	L	GF	GA	GD	Pts	Qualification	CAL	MIL	AME	LLA
1	Deportivo Cali	6	4	0	2	9	5	+4	12	Finals and qualification for Copa Libertadores Femenina	—	2–1	2–0	3–1
2	Millonarios	6	4	0	2	11	8	+3	12		1–0	—	0–1	3–1
3	América de Cali	6	3	0	3	8	8	0	9		2–1	2–3	—	3–1
4	Llaneros	6	1	0	5	6	13	−7	3		0–1	2–3	1–0	—

Source: Dimayor, Soccerway
Legend: Blue = home team win; Yellow = draw; Red = away team win.
Rules for classification: 1) Points, 2) First stage position (only applies for the seeded team, if it is involved in a tie), 3) Goal difference, 4) Goals for, 5) Away goals for, 6) Away goals against, 7) Yellow cards, 8) Red cards, 9) First stage position.

== Finals ==
11 August 2024
15:30 UTC−5

Deportivo Cali	2–1	Santa Fe
Pérez 44' (o.g.); Guerra 68'	Report	Torres 54'

Estadio Deportivo Cali, Palmira
Attendance: 11,466
Referee: Mariana Quintero

16 August 2024
19:30 UTC−5

Santa Fe	0–2	Deportivo Cali
	Report	Paví 12', 45+2'

Estadio El Campín, Bogotá
Referee: Danna Victorino

Deportivo Cali won 4–1 on aggregate.

Liga Femenina BetPlay DIMAYOR
2024 champions

2nd title

== Aggregate table ==
Pos	Team	Pld	W	D	L	GF	GA	GD	Pts	Qualification
1	Deportivo Cali (C)	22	13	5	4	29	14	+15	44	Qualification for the Copa Libertadores Femenina
2	Atlético Nacional	20	12	7	1	49	13	+36	43	
3	América de Cali	20	13	3	4	42	19	+23	42	
4	Santa Fe	22	12	4	6	29	24	+5	40	Qualification for the Copa Libertadores Femenina
5	Millonarios	20	10	6	4	28	18	+10	36	
6	Alianza	20	8	5	7	21	23	−2	29	
7	Independiente Medellín	20	6	5	9	29	28	+1	23	
8	Llaneros	20	7	2	11	17	28	−11	23	
9	La Equidad	14	5	4	5	23	19	+4	19	
10	Internacional	14	6	1	7	17	19	−2	19	
11	Deportivo Pasto	14	5	2	7	14	17	−3	17	
12	Cúcuta Deportivo	14	3	5	6	10	18	−8	14	
13	Deportivo Pereira	14	3	0	11	10	32	−22	9	
14	Real Santander	14	1	3	10	15	38	−23	6	
15	Junior	14	0	2	12	9	32	−23	2	

Source: Dimayor
Rules for classification: 1) Points, 2) Goal difference, 3) Goals for, 4) Away goals for, 5) Away goals against, 6) Yellow cards, 7) Red cards, 8) Drawing of lots.
(C) Champions

== Top scorers ==
Rank	Player	Club	Goals
1	(Colombia) Estefanía González	Independiente Medellín	10
1	(Colombia) Marcela Restrepo	Atlético Nacional	10
3	(Colombia) Tatiana Ariza	Millonarios	9
3	(Colombia) María Paula Córdoba	América de Cali	9
3	(Colombia) Yisela Cuesta	Atlético Nacional	9
3	(Colombia) Karla Torres	Santa Fe	9
7	(Colombia) Sandra Ibargüen	Deportivo Pasto	6
7	(Colombia) Yoreli Rincón	Atlético Nacional	6
9	(Colombia) Wendys Cabrera	La Equidad	5
9	(Colombia) Lorena Cobos	Llaneros	5
9	(Colombia) Ingrid Guerra	Deportivo Cali	5
9	(Colombia) Manuela Paví	Deportivo Cali	5
9	(Colombia) Gisela Robledo	América de Cali	5
9	(Colombia) Karen Urrutia	Alianza	5
9	(Colombia) Ingrid Vidal	América de Cali	5
9	(Colombia) Mariana Zamorano	América de Cali	5

Source: Soccerway

== See also ==
- Colombian Women's Football League
