= Letícia Santos =

Brazilian footballer

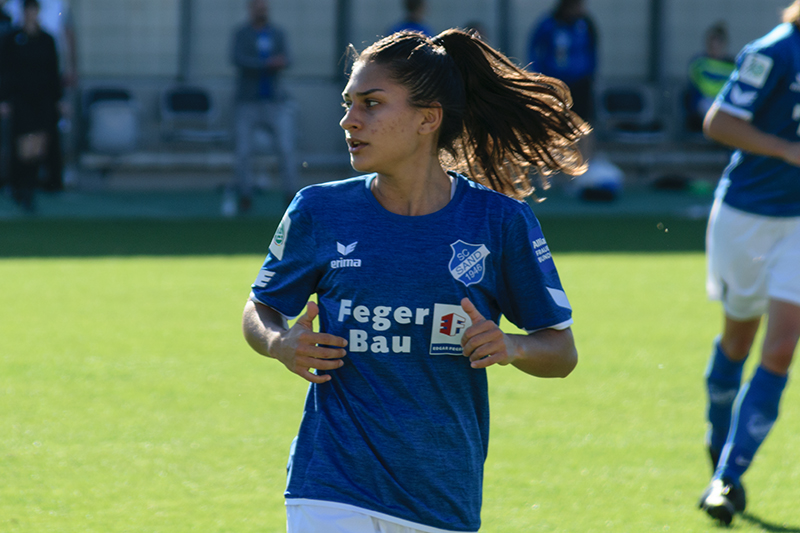
- Letícia Santos playing for SC Sand in 2017

Personal information
- Full name: Letícia Santos de Oliveira
- Date of birth: 2 December 1994 (age 31)
- Place of birth: Atibaia, Brazil
- Height: 1.58 m (5 ft 2 in)
- Position: Right-back

Team information
- Current team: Santos
- Number: 18

Youth career
- 2006: Legionário
- 2007–2010: Big Soccer Atibaia
- 2010: Palmeiras
- 2011: Santos
- 2011: Bangu
- 2012–2013: XV de Piracicaba
- 2013: Kindermann

Senior career*
| Years | Team | Apps | (Gls) |
| 2012–2013 | XV de Piracicaba | 21 | (1) |
| 2014 | São José | 10 | (0) |
| 2015–2016 | Avaldsnes IL | 34 | (2) |
| 2017–2019 | SC Sand | 47 | (2) |
| 2019–2023 | Eintracht Frankfurt (Note: Known during the 2019-20 season as 1. FFC Frankfurt.) | 38 | (0) |
| 2023 | Eintracht Frankfurt II | 2 | (0) |
| 2024–2025 | Corinthians | 25 | (3) |
| 2026– | Santos | 0 | (0) |

International career^{‡}
| 2014 | Brazil U20 | 10 | (0) |
| 2017–2022 | Brazil | 38 | (0) |
- * Club domestic league appearances and goals as of 21:02, 10 January 2026 (UTC) ‡ National team caps and goals as of 01:45, 14 August 2022 (UTC)

Letícia Santos de Oliveira (born 2 December 1994), known as Letícia Santos or just Letícia, is a Brazilian footballer who plays as a right-back for Santos.

== Club career ==
Born in Atibaia, São Paulo, Letícia played for the youth sides of Palmeiras, Santos, Bangu, XV de Piracicaba and Kindermann. She made her senior debut at XV in 2012, before moving to São José in 2014.

In January 2015, after helping São José to win the 2014 International Women's Club Championship, Letícia moved abroad for the first time in her career, joining Avaldsnes IL of the Norwegian Toppserien. There, she played with compatriots Andréia Rosa, Luana and Bruna Benites.

After two seasons in Norway, Letícia signed for the German club SC Sand on 16 January 2017. She extended her contract a year later after her performances impressed the team's coach.

In June 2019, Letícia moved to fellow first division side 1. FFC Frankfurt. She suffered a knee injury the following March, but still continued at the club afterwards, after they merged with Eintracht Frankfurt.

On 10 January 2024, Letícia returned to her home country after being announced at Corinthians. Exactly two years later, she returned to Santos on a one-year contract, now for the first team.

== International career ==
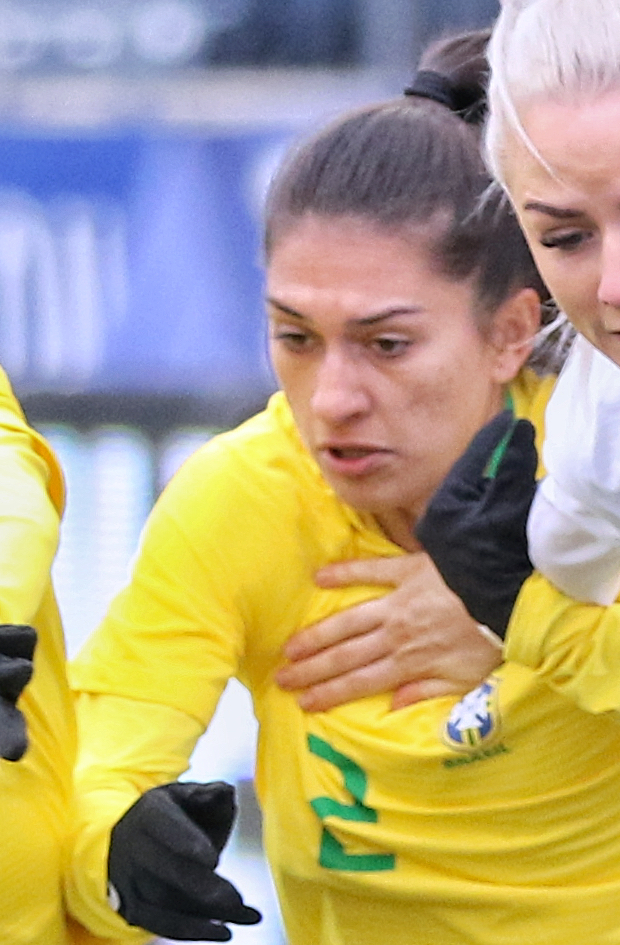
Letícia playing for the Brazil national team in the 2019 SheBelieves Cup

With the Brazil national under-20 team, Letícia attended the FIFA U-20 Women's World Cup in 2014. She played in all three matches in the competition, as they were knocked out in the group stage. Prior to that, she helped the side to win the 2014 South American U-20 Women's Championship, playing in all seven matches of the tournament.

Letícia received her first call-up to the full side in March 2017 for a friendly against Bolivia in Manaus. She started the match and assisted Marta for Brazil's third goal in their 6–0 win.

In October 2017, Letícia was recalled to the senior national team for the 2017 Yongchuan International Tournament as a replacement for regular right-back Fabiana who withdrew with a knee sprain. She would also be included in the squads for the 2019 FIFA Women's World Cup, 2020 Summer Olympics and the 2022 Copa América Femenina, winning the latter tournament.

== Career statistics ==
=== Club ===
As of 10 January 2026

Appearances and goals by club, season and competition
| Club | Season | League | | | State league | | Cup | | Continental | | Other | | Total | |
| Club | Season | Division | Apps | Goals | Apps | Goals | Apps | Goals | Apps | Goals | Apps | Goals | Apps | Goals |
|---|---|---|---|---|---|---|---|---|---|---|---|---|---|---|
| XV de Piracicaba | 2012 | Paulista | — | | 7 | 0 | — | | — | | — | | 7 | 0 |
| XV de Piracicaba | 2013 | Paulista | — | | 14 | 1 | — | | — | | — | | 14 | 1 |
| XV de Piracicaba | Total | | — | | 21 | 1 | — | | — | | — | | 21 | 1 |
| São José | 2014 | Série A1 | 4 | 0 | 6 | 0 | — | | 5 (Note: Appearance(s) in Copa Libertadores Femenina) | 0 | 2 (Note: Appearance(s) in International Women's Club Championship) | 0 | 17 | 0 |
| Avaldsnes IL | 2015 | Toppserien | 21 | 1 | — | | 4 | 0 | — | | — | | 25 | 1 |
| Avaldsnes IL | 2016 | Toppserien | 13 | 1 | — | | 2 | 0 | 3 (Note: Appearance(s) in UEFA Women's Champions League) | 1 | — | | 18 | 2 |
| Avaldsnes IL | Total | | 34 | 2 | — | | 6 | 0 | 3 | 1 | — | | 43 | 3 |
| SC Sand | 2016–17 | Frauen-Bundesliga | 9 | 0 | — | | 2 | 0 | — | | — | | 11 | 0 |
| SC Sand | 2017–18 | Frauen-Bundesliga | 21 | 0 | — | | 3 | 0 | — | | — | | 24 | 0 |
| SC Sand | 2018–19 | Frauen-Bundesliga | 17 | 2 | — | | 1 | 0 | — | | — | | 18 | 2 |
| SC Sand | Total | | 47 | 2 | — | | 6 | 0 | — | | — | | 53 | 2 |
| Eintracht Frankfurt | 2019–20 | Frauen-Bundesliga | 10 | 0 | — | | 2 | 0 | — | | — | | 12 | 0 |
| Eintracht Frankfurt | 2020–21 | Frauen-Bundesliga | 9 | 0 | — | | 3 | 0 | — | | — | | 12 | 0 |
| Eintracht Frankfurt | 2021–22 | Frauen-Bundesliga | 14 | 0 | — | | 2 | 0 | — | | — | | 16 | 0 |
| Eintracht Frankfurt | 2022–23 | Frauen-Bundesliga | 3 | 0 | — | | 1 | 0 | — | | — | | 4 | 0 |
| Eintracht Frankfurt | 2023–24 | Frauen-Bundesliga | 2 | 0 | — | | 0 | 0 | 2 | 0 | — | | 4 | 0 |
| Eintracht Frankfurt | Total | | 38 | 0 | — | | 8 | 0 | 2 | 0 | — | | 48 | 0 |
| Eintracht Frankfurt II | 2023–24 | 2. Frauen-Bundesliga | 2 | 0 | — | | — | | — | | — | | 2 | 0 |
| Corinthians | 2024 | Série A1 | 10 | 0 | 8 | 0 | — | | 0 | 0 | 0 | 0 | 18 | 0 |
| Corinthians | 2025 | Série A1 | 2 | 0 | 5 | 0 | 1 | 0 | 0 | 0 | 1 (Note: Appearance(s) in Supercopa do Brasil de Futebol Feminino) | 0 | 9 | 0 |
| Corinthians | Total | | 12 | 0 | 13 | 0 | 1 | 0 | 0 | 0 | 1 | 0 | 27 | 0 |
| Santos | 2026 | Série A1 | 0 | 0 | 0 | 0 | 0 | 0 | — | | — | | 0 | 0 |
| Career total | | | 137 | 4 | 34 | 1 | 21 | 0 | 10 | 1 | 3 | 0 | 205 | 5 |

=== International ===
As of 17 April 2021

| National team | Year | Apps | Goals |
|---|---|---|---|
| Brazil | 2017 | 12 | 0 |
| Brazil | 2018 | 3 | 0 |
| Brazil | 2019 | 12 | 0 |
| Brazil | 2020 | 1 | 0 |
| Brazil | 2021 | 2 | 0 |
| Brazil | 2022 | 7 | 0 |
| Total | | 37 | 0 |

== Honours ==
São José

- Copa Libertadores Femenina: 2014
- Campeonato Paulista de Futebol Feminino: 2014
- International Women's Club Championship: 2014

Corinthians

- Supercopa do Brasil de Futebol Feminino: 2024
- Campeonato Brasileiro de Futebol Feminino Série A1: 2024, 2025

Brazil U20

- South American U-20 Women's Championship: 2014

Brazil

- Copa América Femenina: 2022
