= Santa Luzia, Maranhão =

Santa Luzia
- Municipality
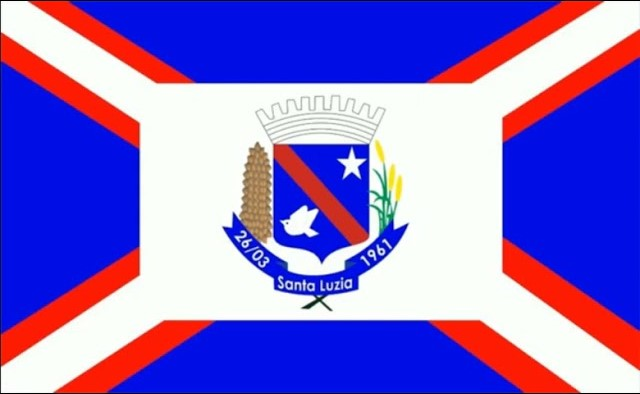
- Flag
- Nickname: Rainha do Vale do Pindaré
- Location in Brazil
- Coordinates: 3°57′56.3″S 45°39′42.2″W
- Country: Brazil
- Region: Nordeste
- State: Maranhão
- Mesoregion: Oeste Maranhense
- Elevation: 200 ft (60 m)

Population (2022)
  - Total: 57.635
  - Density: 30.9/sq mi (11.92/km^{2})
- Time zone: UTC−3 (BRT)

Santa Luzia is a municipality in the state of Maranhão in the Northeast region of Brazil.

== See also ==
- List of municipalities in Maranhão
