= Lucas Piccinato =

Brazilian football manager

Personal information
- Full name: Lucas Piccinato de Sá
- Date of birth: 5 April 1990 (age 36)
- Place of birth: São Paulo, Brazil

Team information
- Current team: Valencia Femenino (head coach)

Managerial career
- Years: Team
- 2014: Centro Olímpico U15 (assistant)
- 2015–2016: Centro Olímpico (assistant)
- 2017: Centro Olímpico U17
- 2017–2018: Centro Olímpico
- 2019–2022: São Paulo (women)
- 2023: Internacional (women)
- 2024–2026: Corinthians (women)
- 2026–: Valencia Femenino

Lucas Piccinato de Sá (born 5 April 1990) is a Brazilian football coach, who is the current head coach of Liga F team Valencia Femenino.

== Career ==
Born in São Paulo, Piccinato began his career with the women's sides of Centro Olímpico, being an assistant of the under-15 team before moving to the main squad under the same role, working with Arthur Elias and Jonas Urias. In 2017, after a period as head coach of the under-17 squad, he took over the first team.

Ahead of the 2019 season, Piccinato moved to São Paulo as the head coach of their newly-formed women's team. In his first year, he won the Campeonato Brasileiro Série A2 and reached the finals of the Campeonato Paulista.

On 14 December 2022, Piccinato was dismissed by the Tricolor, after being eliminated in the semifinals of the year's Paulistão. The following 16 July, he took over Internacional.

Piccinato resigned from Inter on 27 November 2023, and was named at the helm of Corinthians on 7 December. In his first two seasons, he won two consecutive Campeonato Brasileiro Série A1 and Copa Libertadores Femenina titles, aside from lifting the 2024 Supercopa do Brasil.

On 21 February 2026, following a draw against Fluminense in the second round of the Campeonato Brasileiro Série A1, Piccinato was dismissed from Corinthians.

On 2 November 2026, Piccinato was announced as the new head coach of Valencia Femenino.

== Managerial statistics ==
As of 2 November 2026

Managerial record by team and tenure
Team	Nat	From	To	Record								Ref.
Team	Nat	From	To	G	W	D	L	GF	GA	GD	Win %	Ref.
São Paulo	(Brazil)	1 January 2019	14 December 2022	130	82	23	25	314	98	+216	63.08	
Internacional	(Brazil)	16 July 2023	27 November 2023	15	11	2	2	54	16	+38	73.33	
Corinthians	(Brazil)	1 January 2024	21 February 2026	101	71	20	10	240	80	+160	70.30	
Valencia Femenino	(Spain)	2 November 2026	Present	0	0	0	0	0	0	+0	—	
Total				245	166	44	35	608	187	+421	67.76	—

== Honours ==
São Paulo

- Campeonato Brasileiro de Futebol Feminino Série A2: 2019

Internacional

- Campeonato Gaúcho de Futebol Feminino: 2023

Corinthians

- Campeonato Brasileiro de Futebol Feminino Série A1: 2024, 2025
- Copa Libertadores Femenina: 2024, 2025
- Supercopa do Brasil: 2024
