= Eudimilla =

Brazilian footballer (born 2001)

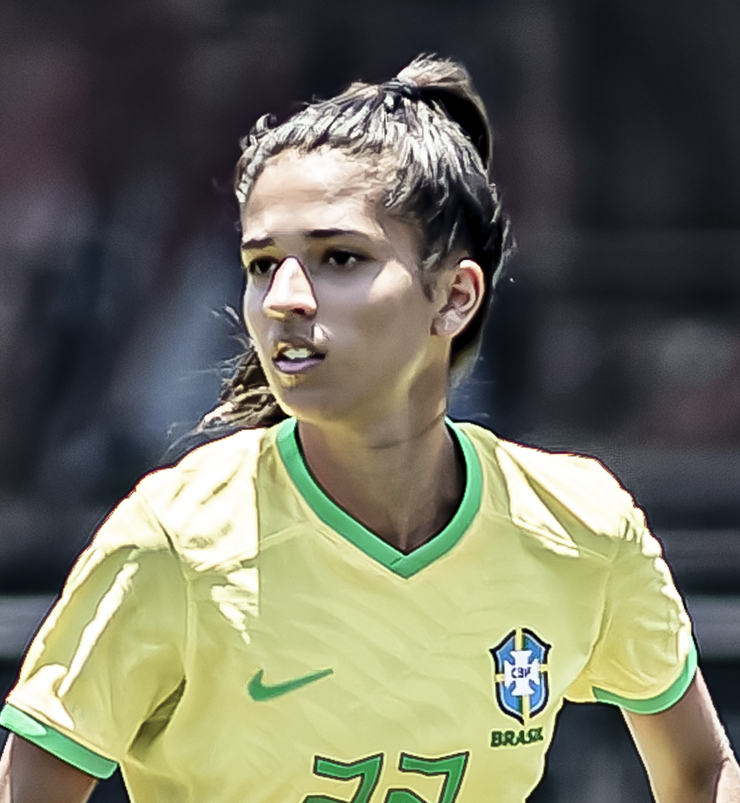
- Eudimilla with the Brazil national team in 2023

Personal information
- Full name: Eudimilla de Souza Rodrigues
- Date of birth: 6 May 2001 (age 25)
- Place of birth: Santa Luzia, Brazil
- Height: 1.68 m (5 ft 6 in)
- Position: Forward

Team information
- Current team: Pachuca

Youth career
- 2017: Juventus-SP
- 2018–2019: Chapecoense

Senior career*
Years	Team	Apps	(Gls)
2019	Chapecoense	6	(0)
2019–2021	Grêmio	27	(14)
2022–2023	Ferroviária	60	(21)
2024–2025	Corinthians	54	(8)
2026	Santos	14	(0)
2026–	Pachuca	0	(0)

International career^{‡}
2019	Brazil U20	3	(0)
2023–	Brazil	2	(0)
- * Club domestic league appearances and goals as of 16:16, 4 August 2026 (UTC) ‡ National team caps and goals as of 03:37, 14 February 2024 (UTC)

Eudimilla de Souza Rodrigues (born 6 May 2001), simply known as Eudimilla, is a Brazilian footballer who plays as a forward for Liga Femenil club Pachuca and the Brazil women's national team.

== Club career ==
=== Early career ===
Born in Santa Luzia, Maranhão, Eudimilla began her career with Juventus-SP in 2017. She moved to Chapecoense in 2018, and made her senior debut with the club in the 2019 Campeonato Brasileiro Série A2.

On 29 August 2019, Eudimilla was announced at Grêmio. On 25 December 2021, she joined Ferroviária.

=== Corinthians ===
On 5 January 2024, it was announced that Eudimilla signed with Corinthians after her contract ended.

=== Santos ===
On 4 January 2026, Santos announced the signing of Eudimilla on a two-year deal. Mainly a backup option under head coach Caio Couto, she became a starter after the arrival of Marcelo Frigerio.

=== Pachuca ===
On 29 July 2026, Santos announced Eudimilla's transfer to Liga Femenil side Pachuca, for a rumoured fee of US$ 350,000.

== International career ==
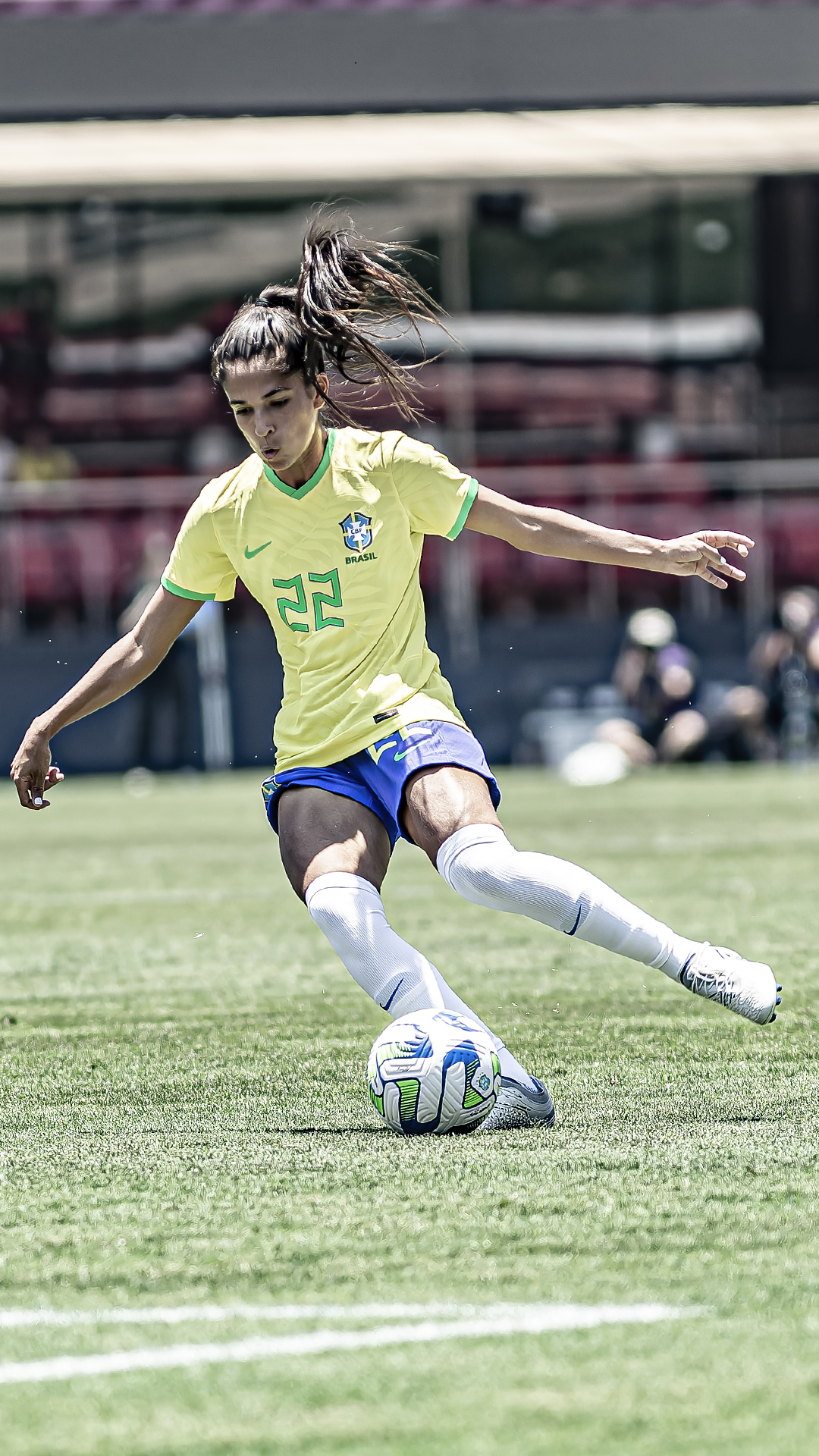
Eudimilla playing for the Brazil national team in 2023

After representing Brazil at under-20 level in three friendlies in 2019, Eudimilla received her first call-up to the full side on 13 November 2023, for three friendlies against Japan and Nicaragua.

== Career statistics ==
=== Club ===
As of 4 August 2026

Appearances and goals by club, season and competition
Club	Season	League			State league		Cup		Continental		Other		Total	
Club	Season	Division	Apps	Goals	Apps	Goals	Apps	Goals	Apps	Goals	Apps	Goals	Apps	Goals
Chapecoense	2019	Série A2	6	0	—		—		—		—		6	0
Grêmio	2019	Série A1	—		7	5	—		—		—		7	5
Grêmio	2020	Série A1	15	4	1	3	—		—		—		16	7
Grêmio	2021	Série A1	4	2	—		—		—		—		4	2
Grêmio	Total		19	6	8	8	—		—		—		27	14
Ferroviária	2022	Série A1	17	5	13	6	—		3 (Note: Appearance(s) in Copa Libertadores Femenina)	0	—		33	11
Ferroviária	2023	Série A1	20	3	10	7	—		—		4 (Note: Appearance(s) in Copa Paulista de Futebol Feminino)	0	34	10
Ferroviária	Total		37	8	23	13	—		3	0	4	0	67	21
Corinthians	2024	Série A1	18	1	12	3	—		6	3	2 (Note: Appearance(s) in Supercopa do Brasil de Futebol Feminino)	0	38	7
Corinthians	2025	Série A1	13	2	11	2	1	0	—		1	0	26	4
Corinthians	Total		21	3	23	5	1	0	6	3	3	0	64	11
Santos	2026	Série A1	11	0	3	0	1	0	—		—		15	0
Pachuca	2026–27	Liga Femenil	0	0	—		—		—		—		0	0
Career total			94	17	57	26	2	0	9	3	7	0	168	46

=== International ===
As of 4 January 2026

National team	Year	Apps	Goals
Brazil	2023	2	0
Total		2	0
