= Nicole Ramos =

Brazilian footballer (born 2000)

Personal information
- Date of birth: 13 April 2000 (age 26)
- Place of birth: Taió, Santa Catarina, Brasil
- Height: 1.70 m (5 ft 7 in)
- Position: Goalkeeper

Team information
- Current team: Corinthians
- Number: 1

Senior career*
Years	Team	Apps	(Gls)
2016	Esportivo Juventus		
2017	Santos		
2021	Napoli-SC		
2021	Fluminense		
2022–2023	Atlético Mineiro	22	(0)
2024–	Corinthians	24	(0)

International career
- Brazil U15
- Brazil U17
- Brazil U20
- * Club domestic league appearances and goals as of 27 January 2026

Nicole Ramos (born 13 April 2000), often known mononymously as Nicole, is a Brazilian professional footballer who plays as a goalkeeper for Brazilian club Corinthians.

== Early life and career ==
Alongside her twin brother Nicolas Ramos, Nicole played athletics, volleyball, table tennis, and even decided on futsal. From the age of eight to 15, she participated in men's championships, even receiving awards for goalkeeper with the fewest goals conceded in the competition. Even though she never competed on the field, her coach contacted Emily Lima, who was the coach of the national team, and they sent her the goalkeeper's saves. The coach liked them and called Nicole up for the Brazilian Under-15 team.

== Club career ==
=== Santos ===
In 2017, Nicole was signed by Santos.

In October 2019, with the youth team, she won the South Zone title of the U-19 South American League, a friendly tournament organized by CONMEBOL.

With Sereias da Vila, where she played for four years, Nicole won the Campeonato Brasileiro and Campeonato Paulista runner-up in 2017, the Paulista and Copa Libertadores runner-up in 2018, and the Copa Paulista Championship in 2020.

=== Napoli-SC and Fluminense ===
In the first half of 2021, Nicole played in the Série A1 for Associação Napoli Caçadorense (SC). The team did not qualify for the second phase of the championship and, after being eliminated in June, she received an offer from Fluminense. In August 2021, Nicole was introduced to Tricolor Carioca.

=== Atlético Mineiro ===
For 2022, Nicole signed with Atlético Mineiro. She played for the club until the end of 2023.

=== Corinthians ===
For the 2024 season, Nicole signed with Corinthians. In February, she won the Supercopa do Brasil trophy, still only as a reserve. Nicole made her Corinthians debut on 21 March 2024, when they beat América-MG 4-1, in a match valid for the 2024 Brazilian Women's Championship. In the same year, she was champion of the Copa Libertadores Femenina.

== International career ==
In 2016, Nicole played in the U-17 World Cup, then was called up to the U-20 team, where she also played in the World Cup and her team became the South American Championship in the same year.

Between 5 and 20 January 2021, Nicole spent a training period in Viamão with the senior Brazilian national team. Between 5 and 13 April, she trained again with the national team, this time at Granja Comary, in Teresópolis, Rio de Janeiro.

== Honors and awards ==
Santos

- Campeonato Brasileiro: 2017
- Campeonato Paulista: 2018
- Copa Paulista: 2020

Atlético Mineiro

- Campeonato Mineiro: 2022

Corinthians

- Supercopa do Brasil: 2024
- Campeonato Brasileiro: 2024, 2025
- Copa Libertadores Femenina: 2024, 2025

Brazil U20

- South American U-20 Women's Championship: 2018

Individual

- Campeonato Brasileiro Série A1 Team of the Year: 2025
