= Gabi Portilho =

Brazilian footballer (born 1995)

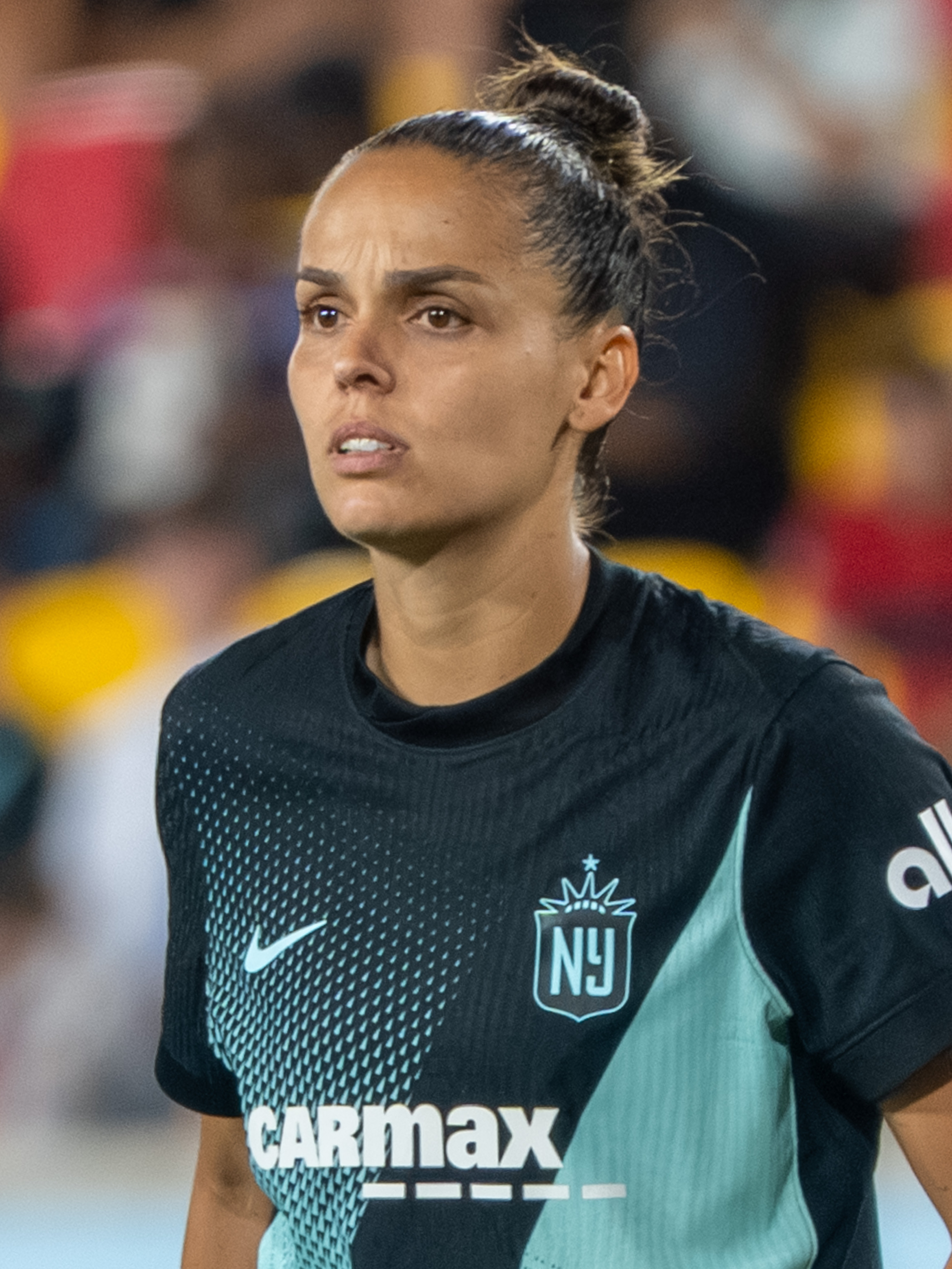
- Portilho in 2025

Personal information
- Full name: Gabrielle Jordão Portilho
- Date of birth: 18 July 1995 (age 31)
- Place of birth: Brasília, Brazil
- Height: 1.65 m (5 ft 5 in)
- Positions: Forward; midfielder

Team information
- Current team: San Diego Wave
- Number: 81

Senior career*
Years	Team	Apps	(Gls)
2013–2014	Kindermann	15	(4)
2015–2016	São José	24	(7)
2016–2017	Madrid CFF		
2018	São José	12	(1)
2019	Audax	15	(1)
2019	3B da Amazônia	8	(10)
2020–2024	Corinthians	74	(17)
2025	Gotham FC	17	(3)
2026–	San Diego Wave	21	(0)

International career^{‡}
2012	Brazil U17	2	(0)
2014	Brazil U20	1	(0)
2022–	Brazil	28	(4)
Medal record
Women's football
Representing Brazil
Copa América Femenina
Gold medal – first place	2022 Colombia
Gold medal – first place	2025 Ecuador
Olympic Games
Silver medal – second place	2024 Paris
- * Club domestic league appearances and goals as of 16:44, 15 November 2026 (UTC) ‡ National team caps and goals as of 22:50, 6 August 2024 (UTC)

Gabrielle Jordão Portilho (born 18 July 1995) is a Brazilian professional footballer who plays as a forward or midfielder for San Diego Wave FC of the National Women's Soccer League (NWSL) and the Brazil national team.

== Club career ==
Portilho was announced at Kindermann on 23 December 2012. She made her league debut against Foz Cataratas on 18 September 2013. Portilho scored her first league goal against Vasco da Gama on 18 September 2014, scoring in the 39th minute.

Portilho made her league debut for São José against Foz Cataratas on 10 September 2015. She scored her first league goals against Mixto on 16 September 2015, scoring 4 goals against the club.

Hired in 2016 by Spanish team Madrid CFF, Portilho only played for seven months, before a grave knee injury forced her to spend a whole year recovering, during which she returned to Brazil.

During her second spell at São José, Portilho made her league debut against Sport Recife on 25 April 2018. She scored her first league goal against Pinheirense on 8 August 2018, scoring in the 80th minute.

Portilho made her league debut against EC Vitória on 16 March 2019. She scored her first league goal against Avaí on 15 September 2019, scoring in the 17th minute.

Portilho was part of the 2019 3B da Amazônia squad. Playing in the Campeonato Amazonense, she scored ten goals in only eight matches for the team.

In January 2020, Portilho signed for Corinthians. This was the first professional club that she had played for. Gabi Portilho made her league debut against Palmeiras on 9 February 2020. She scored her first league goal against Cruzeiro on 7 September 2020, scoring in the 74th minute. By 2024, Portilho had won 15 titles with Corinthians, including five editions of the Brazilian championship and three continental tournaments in the Copa Libertadores Femenina.

On 30 December 2024, Portilho signed a multi-year contract with National Women's Soccer League club Gotham FC. She scored on her NWSL debut on 15 March 2025, volleying the ball from the top of the penalty box in the season opener, a 1–1 draw against Seattle Reign. Portilho's goal made her the first Brazilian international to score in their first NWSL appearance. She went on to register 3 goals and 3 assists in 17 appearances, helping Gotham secure its second NWSL Championship title.

In March 2026, Gotham FC traded Portilho to San Diego Wave FC in exchange for $175,000 in transfer funds. Portilho made her Wave debut on 14 March 2026, earning the start in San Diego's season-opening loss to the Houston Dash.

== International career ==
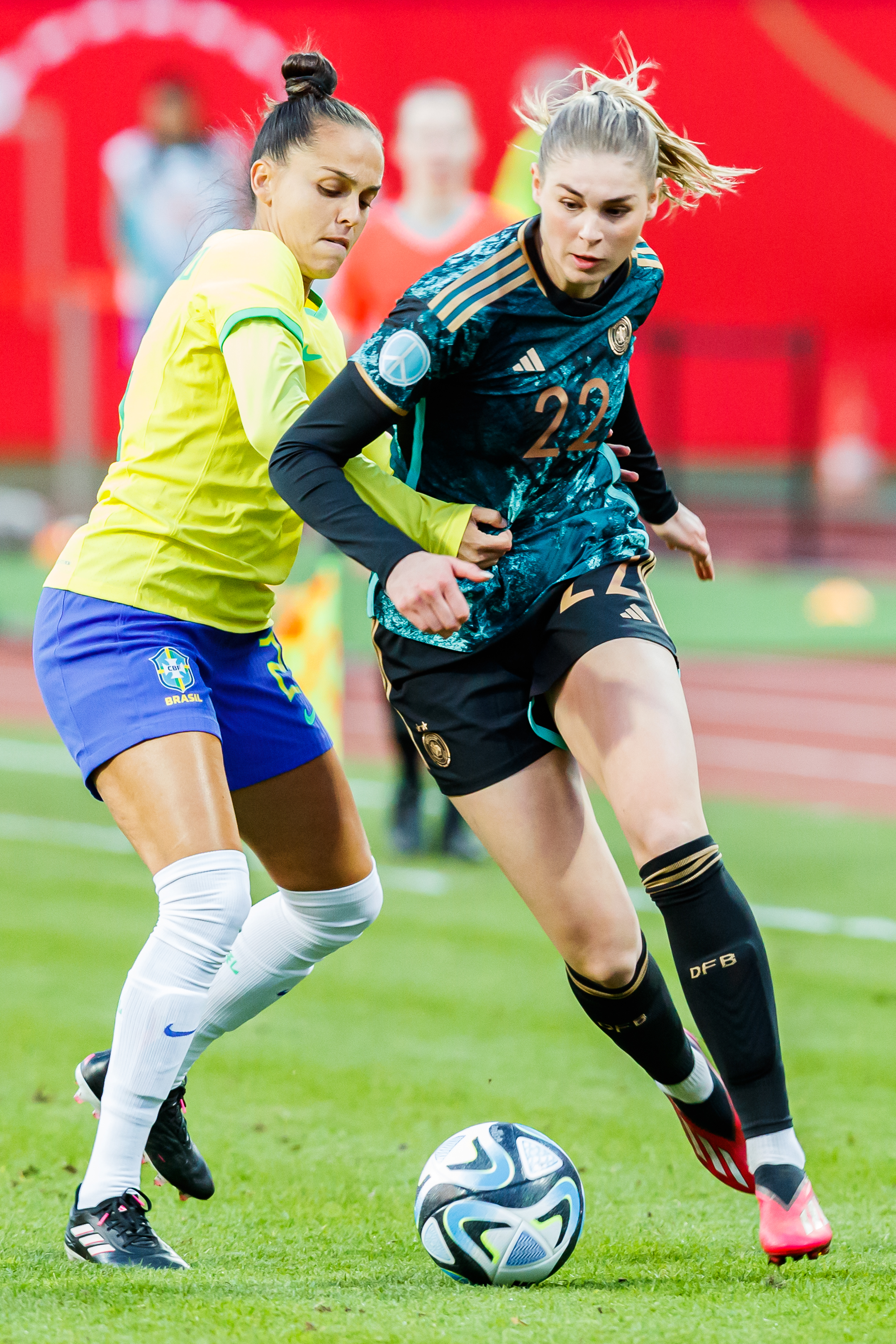
Portilho playing against Jule Brand in 2023.

Portilho made her u–17 debut against Japan U17s on 23 September 2012. In 2024, Portilho was called up to the U–20 squad. She made her debut a few months later against Germany U20s on 12 August 2014.

Portilho was called up to the Brazil squad in 2017, but had to pull out due to an injury. She was replaced by Camila.

Portilho made her international debut against Spain on 7 April 2022. She scored her first goal against Japan on 30 November 2023, scoring in the 61st minute. Portilho was called up to the Brazil squad for the 2022 Copa América Femenina, which Brazil finished as winners.

On 1 February 2024, Portilho was called up to the Brazil squad for the 2024 CONCACAF W Gold Cup.

On 2 July 2024, Portilho was called up to the Brazil squad for the 2024 Summer Olympics. During the 2024 Summer Olympics, Gabi Portilho helped Brazil win the silver medal, scoring the goal that made them beat hosts France in the quarterfinals, and another during the semifinal with Spain. Portilho ended up listed at 18th place in the 2024 Ballon d'Or, and on December 4, The Guardian chose Portilho at the 60th place among the top 100 women footballers in the world of the year.

== Career statistics ==
No.	Date	Venue	Opponent	Score	Result	Competition
1.	30 November 2023	Arena Corinthians, São Paulo, Brazil	Japan	2–1	4–3	Friendly
2.	3 August 2024	Stade de la Beaujoire, Nantes, France	France	1–0	1–0	2024 Summer Olympics
3.	6 August 2024	Stade Vélodrome, Marseille, France	Spain	2–0	4–2	2024 Summer Olympics
4.	1 December 2024	Robina Stadium, Gold Coast, Australia	Australia	1–0	2–1	Friendly

== Honours ==
Kindermann

- Campeonato Catarinense: 2013, 2014

3B da Amazônia

- Campeonato Amazonense: 2019

Corinthians

- Campeonato Brasileiro: 2020, 2021, 2022, 2023, 2024
- Copa Libertadores da América: 2021, 2023, 2024
- Campeonato Paulista: 2020, 2021, 2023
- Supercopa do Brasil: 2022, 2023, 2024
- Copa Paulista: 2022

Gotham FC

- NWSL Championship: 2025
- CONCACAF W Champions Cup: 2024–25

Brazil

- Copa América: 2022, 2025
- Summer Olympics silver medal: 2024

Individual

- Bola de Prata: 2024
- The Best FIFA Women's 11: 2024
