= Jaqueline Ribeiro =

Brazilian footballer

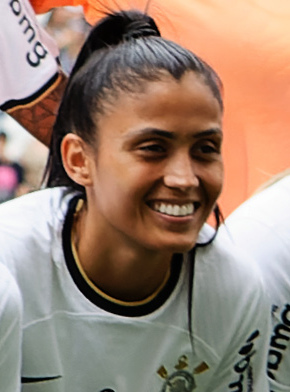
- Jaqueline with Corinthians in 2023

Personal information
- Full name: Jaqueline Ribeiro dos Santos Almeida
- Date of birth: 31 March 2000 (age 26)
- Place of birth: Guarulhos, Brazil
- Height: 1.72 m (5 ft 8 in)
- Position: Forward

Team information
- Current team: Corinthians
- Number: 30

Youth career
- 2014–2015: São Caetano

Senior career*
Years	Team	Apps	(Gls)
2016	Portuguesa	2	(0)
2017–2018	Santos	6	(2)
2019–2021	São Paulo	75	(25)
2022–	Corinthians	190	(57)

International career^{‡}
2015–2016	Brazil U17		
2019–2020	Brazil U20	7	(6)
2022–	Brazil	6	(1)
- * Club domestic league appearances and goals as of 27 January 2026 ‡ National team caps and goals as of 27 January 2026

Jaqueline Ribeiro dos Santos Almeida (born 31 March 2000), known as Jaqueline Ribeiro or just Jaqueline, is a Brazilian professional footballer who plays as a forward for Corinthians.

== Club career ==
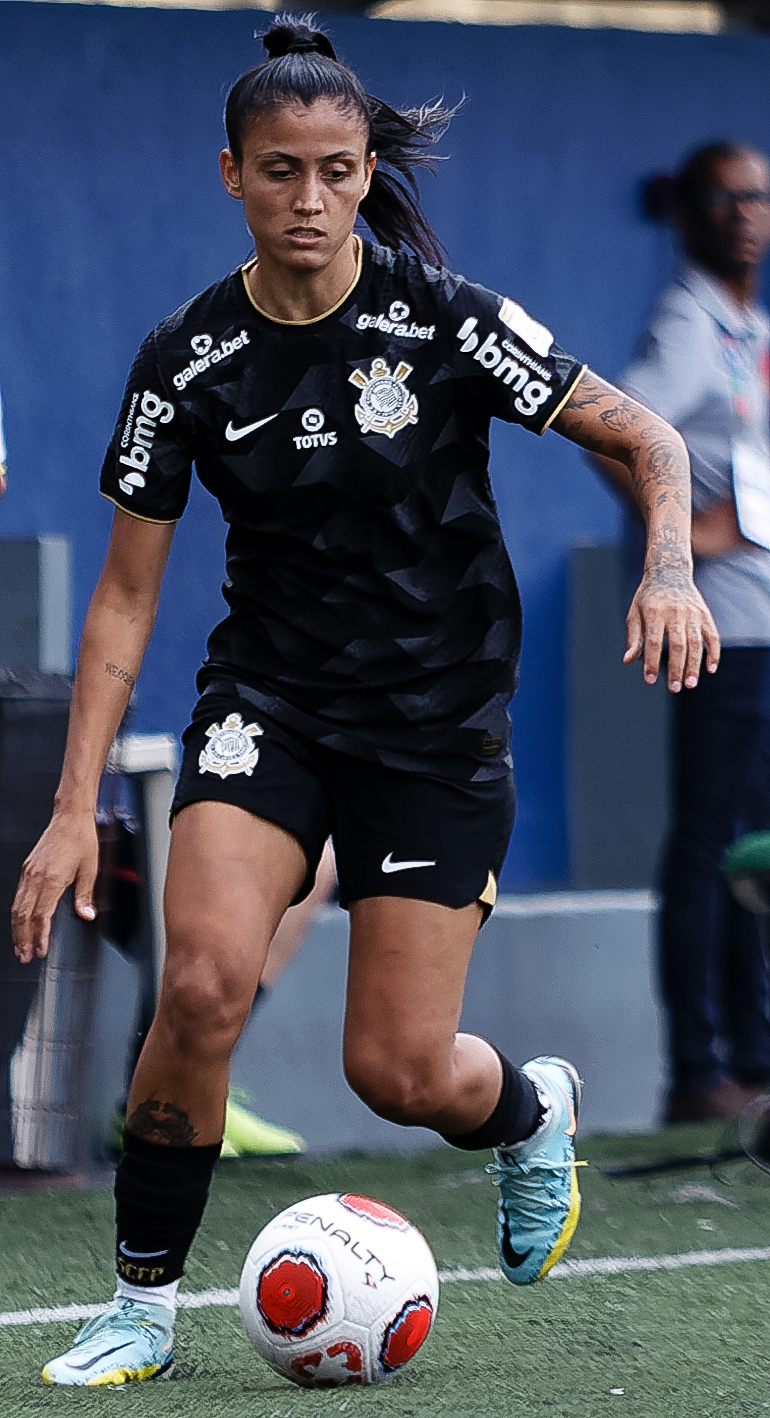
Jaqueline with Corinthians in 2022

Born in Guarulhos, São Paulo, Jaqueline began her career with the futsal team of Palmeiras in 2013. In the following year, she moved to São Caetano, where she played futsal along with football.

Jaqueline made her senior debut with Portuguesa in 2016, aged 16. In the following year, she joined Santos, featuring in only one league match during her first year as the club won the Série A1.

Ahead of the 2019 season, Jaqueline signed for São Paulo as the club was reactivating their women's senior side, and helped in their promotion from the Série A2 as champions; on 28 December 2019, she renewed her contract for a further year. After being named the breakthrough player in the 2020 Série A1, she left Tricolor on 27 December 2021.

On 5 January 2022, Jaqueline was announced at Corinthians.

== International career ==
After representing Brazil at under-17 and under-20 levels, Jaqueline made her full international debut on 5 September 2022, starting in a 6–0 friendly routing of South Africa in Durban.

Jaqueline scored her first international goal on 7 October 2022, netting Brazil's fourth in a 4–1 win over Norway in Oslo.

== Career statistics ==
=== International ===
As of 9 April 2024

Brazil
Year	Apps	Goals
2022	4	1
2024	2	0
Total	6	1

=== International goals ===
Scores and results list Brazil's goal tally first, score column indicates score after each Jaqueline goal.

No.	Date	Venue	Opponent	Score	Result	Competition
1.	7 October 2022	Ullevaal Stadion, Oslo, Norway	Norway	4–1	4–1	Friendly
2.	3 March 2026	FMF Asociación, Toluca, Mexico	Venezuela	1–2	1–2	Friendly

== Honours ==
Santos

- Campeonato Brasileiro de Futebol Feminino Série A1: 2017

São Paulo

- Campeonato Brasileiro de Futebol Feminino Série A2: 2019

Corinthians

- Copa Libertadores Femenina: 2023, 2024, 2025
- Supercopa do Brasil de Futebol Feminino: 2022, 2023, 2024
- Campeonato Brasileiro de Futebol Feminino Série A1: 2022, 2023, 2024, 2025
- Campeonato Paulista: 2023
- Copa Paulista de Futebol Feminino: 2022
