= Estadio Arsenio Erico =

Sports venue in Asunción, Paraguay

Coordinates: 25°19′01″S 57°34′50″W

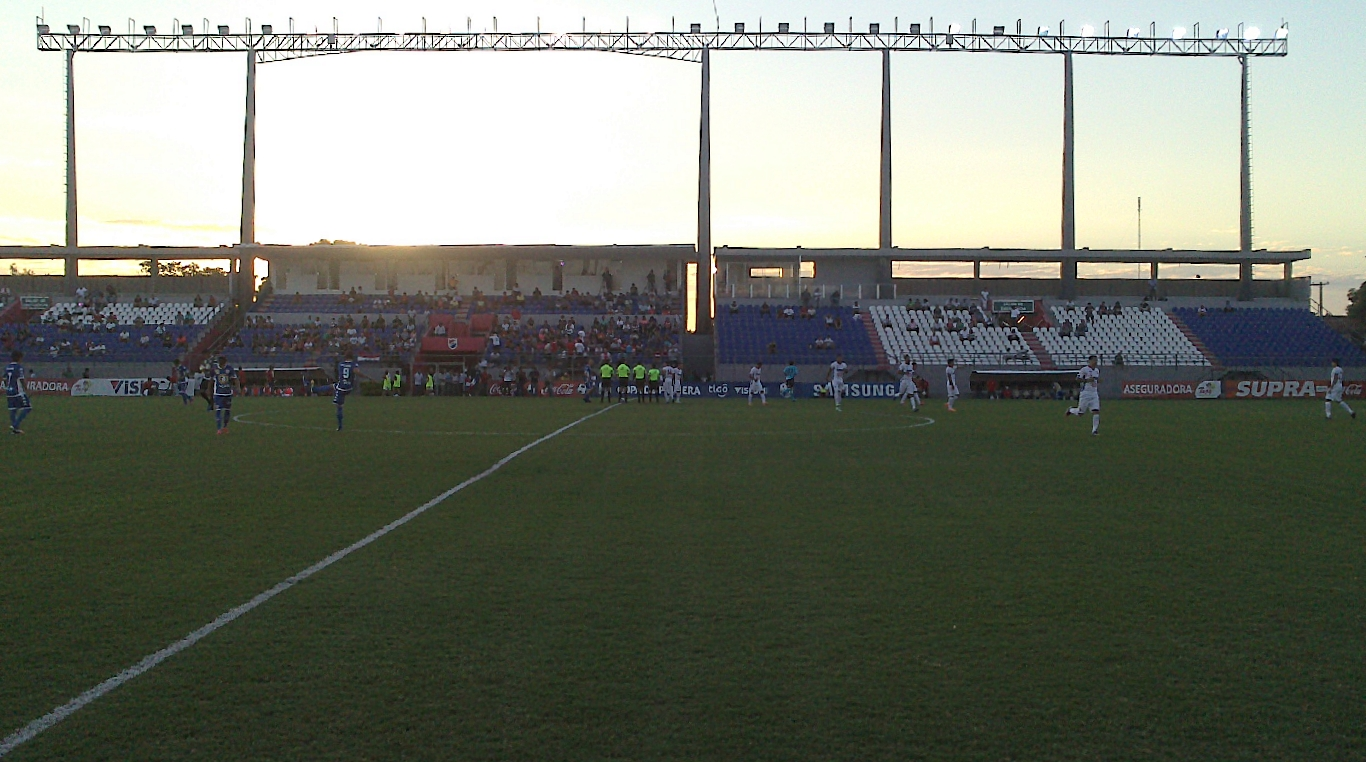
- Interactive map of Estadio Arsenio Erico
- Location: Asunción, Paraguay
- Owner: Nacional
- Capacity: 4,434 (seated)
- Surface: Grass

Construction
- Opened: 1904
- Renovated: 2012–2014

Tenant
- Nacional

Estadio Arsenio Erico is a multi-use stadium in the neighbourhood of Barrio Obrero in Asunción, Paraguay. It is currently used mostly for football matches and is the home stadium of Club Nacional. The stadium holds 4,434 people. It is named after famous Paraguayan footballer Arsenio Erico. In August 2014, big screens were installed in the stadium for fans to see the Copa Libertadores final between Nacional and Argentine club San Lorenzo de Almagro.
