= Ypané =

Ypané Ypane
- City
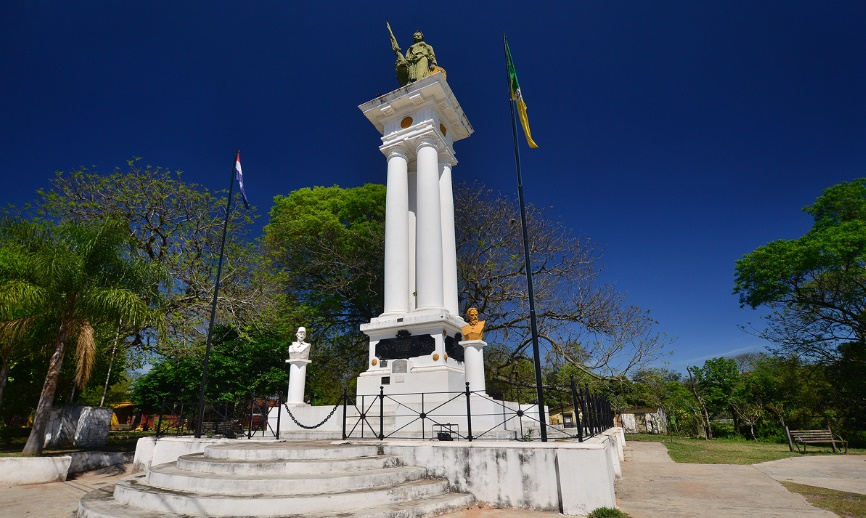

- Flag

- Location within Paraguay
- Coordinates: 25°27′0″S 57°31′48″W
- Country: Paraguay
- Department: Central
- Foundation: March 23, 1538

Government
  - Intendente Municipal: Nicasio Martínez Villamayor

Area
  - Total: 52.7 km^{2} (20.3 sq mi)
- Elevation: 70 m (230 ft)

Population (2008)
  - Total: 34.943 hab.
  - Density: 743.5/km^{2} (1,926/sq mi)
- Time zone: -4 Gmt
- Postal code: 2660
- Area code: (595) (275)
- Climate: Cfa

Ypané (Guarani: Ypane) is a city in the Central Department of Paraguay, 27 km from Asunción. It is accessed by Routes 1 and 2. The city was founded March 23, 1538 by the Spanish Governor Domingo Martínez de Irala. Its main activities are trade and industry.

== Origins ==
The original name of the indigenous people was Pitum, a Guarani expression that means 'medicinal water'. The present town name of Ypané refers to one of the three streams Ypané, Potrerito, and Ytororó, which flow into the Paraguay River. The name Ypané is composed of 'Y' meaning water, 'pa' meaning 'water running and emptying into a river' and 'ne' the smell of estérales and dry streams, in times of drought.

== History ==
In the early years, Ypané was a predominantly agricultural town. Other activities were added later, such as hunting, fishing and rice cultivation. It is known today as a "Garden City".

Ypané was a Franciscan reduction to 1538, and founded on March 23 of the same year by the Spanish Governor Domingo Martínez de Irala. It was founded for the second time on May 6, 1862, when the Franciscans returned to Paraguay.

In the year 1911 the people of Ypané were transferred from their original territory of the spot where the Villa Real is located today, at south latitude 25° 27' 44".

The colours of the flag of the city are green, the colour of hope, and yellow, symbolizing the sun's light toward a new dawn. The idea behind these is the evolution of Ypané from a historic city to a garden city.

== Demographics ==
Ypané has 34,943 inhabitants, of whom 17,696 are male and 17,247 female, and an annual growth rate of 3.61% according to the Dirección General de Estadísticas, Encuestas y Censos. About 34% of the population is urban and the remaining 57% rural.

== Geography ==
Ypané district extends over 5,220 has (7,552 m²), which gives it a population density of 3.5 inhabitants per hectare.

=== Neighborhoods ===
- Lomas verdes
- 6 de junio
- Ytororo
- Colonia Thompson

=== Climate ===
The climate in Ypane is subtropical, with seasonal variations depending on the relative dominance of tropical and polar air masses.

The maximum temperature occurs in summer, reaching 39 °C, or even more at times. The minimum temperature during winter is 1 °C, with an annual average of 22 °C.

Rainfall is about 1433 mm annually, heaviest between the months of January and April and more scarce in the period between June and August.

== Economy ==
The main activities are trade and industry, as well as agricultural cultivation, primarily rice, horticultural crops and fruit trees. The textile industry is distinguished by fabrics made of cotton, such as hammocks, handbags, quilts. Some residents are engaged in the development of ñandutí.

== Tourism ==
Tourist attractions include the former San Pedro Apóstol Church, built by the Indians of the reduction under the direction of the Franciscan Fathers, in the times of the colonization of the Americas. It is located in the heart of the city. The high altar is a national heritage. The patron saint of Ypané is San Pedro Apostol, who is remembered with various activities on June 29 every year.

One of the main attractions is the monument to the Saint of Love, Valentine, located in the hollow of an old tree in the ancient Square of St. Peter the Apostle. This monument is at the center of a large heart shape traced on the surface, and as the town's inhabitants say, if someone (or a couple) makes a wish to the saint, and then walks around the heart, their wish will receive the blessing of St. Valentine.

During the Paraguayan War (fought by Brazil, Argentina and Uruguay against Paraguay), the battle of Ytororó was waged on December 6, 1868 and today at its location there is a monument built in tribute to the Paraguayan heroes. And where the Battle of Avay ('indigenous water') was fought, a bust of the Paraguayan Marshal Francisco Solano López was installed.

On the campus of San Pedro Apòstol's Square there is a fountain named Centro de Atracción Turístico Municipal, reflecting the history and significance of the city of Ypané, where the course of the three streams to their mouths in the Paraguay River can be admired.

Near Ypané the vast lagoon of Yvera, a short distance from Nueva Italia can be visited, with wetlands brimming with life.

The city lacks a developed tourist infrastructure with airports, hotels, restaurants, shopping centers, and other important factors which would enable better exploitation of this area.

== Sources ==
- World Gazeteer: Paraguay – World-Gazetteer.com
- Feature to Country. Volume 1. 2001 edition. Asunción Paraguay.
- Geography of Paraguay Illustrated - ISBN 99925-68-04-6 - Distributed Arami SRL
- The Magic of our land. Alliance Foundation. Asunción. 2007.
