= Vitória Yaya =

Brazilian footballer

Personal information
- Full name: Vitória Ferreira Silva
- Date of birth: 23 January 2002 (age 24)
- Place of birth: Suzano, Brazil
- Height: 1.68 m (5 ft 6 in)
- Position: Midfielder

Team information
- Current team: Paris Saint-Germain
- Number: 18

Youth career
- 2015–2017: Centro Olímpico
- 2017–2019: São Paulo

Senior career*
Years	Team	Apps	(Gls)
2019–2022	São Paulo	47	(4)
2023	Santos	17	(3)
2024–2025	Corinthians	35	(2)
2025–	Paris Saint-Germain	0	(0)

International career^{‡}
2018	Brazil U17	1	(0)
2019–2022	Brazil U20	19	(2)
2022–	Brazil	1	(0)
Medal record
Women's football
Representing Brazil
Copa América Femenina
Gold medal – first place	2025 Ecuador
Olympic Games
Silver medal – second place	2024 Paris
- * Club domestic league appearances and goals as of 14:08, 24 September 2025 (UTC) ‡ National team caps and goals as of 15:04, 20 January 2023 (UTC)

Vitória Ferreira Silva (born 23 January 2002), known as Vitória Yaya or just Yaya, is a Brazilian professional footballer who plays as a midfielder for French Première Ligue club Paris Saint-Germain and the Brazil national team.

== Club career ==
Born in Suzano but raised in Ferraz de Vasconcelos, both in the São Paulo state, Yaya joined Centro Olímpico's youth setup at the age of 13; due to her style of play being similar to Yaya Touré, she earned that nickname. In 2017, she moved to São Paulo after the club established a partnership with Centro Olímpico.

Promoted to the first team for the 2019 season, Yaya made her senior debut on 27 March 2019, starting and scoring the winner in a 1–0 Série A2 home success over América Mineiro. She was a regular starter during the club's league campaign, as they achieved promotion to the Série A1 as champions.

On 8 January 2023, Yaya was announced at Santos. Despite being a regular starter, she left on 20 December.

On 5 January 2024, it was announced that Yaya signed with Corinthians after her contract ended.

In September 2025, Yaya inked a three-year deal with French club Paris Saint-Germain.

== International career ==
Yaya represented Brazil at under-17 level in 2018 South American U-17 Women's Championship and 2018 FIFA U-17 Women's World Cup. On 20 August 2019, aged 17, she received her first call-up for the full side, for the year's International Women's Football Tournament; she remained an unused substitute in Brazil's two matches in the competition.

After playing for the under-20 team in the 2020 and 2022 editions of the South American Under-20 Women's Football Championship, Yaya made her full international debut on 10 October 2022, replacing Ary Borges late into a 1–0 friendly win over Italy at the Stadio Luigi Ferraris in Genoa.

On 1 February 2024, Yaya was called up to the Brazil squad for the 2024 CONCACAF W Gold Cup. In July 2024, Yaya was called up to the Brazil squad for the 2024 Summer Olympics.

== Career statistics ==
=== International ===
As of 20 January 2023

Brazil
Year	Apps	Goals
2022	1	0
Total	1	0

==== International goals ====
No.	Date	Location	Opponent	Score	Result	Competition
1.	2 March 2024	Los Angeles, United States	Argentina	1–0	5–1	2024 CONCACAF W Gold Cup

== Honours ==
São Paulo

- Campeonato Brasileiro de Futebol Feminino Série A2: 2019

Brazil U17

- South American Under-17 Women's Football Championship: 2018

Brazil U20

- South American Under-20 Women's Football Championship: 2022

Brazil

- Summer Olympics silver medal: 2024

Individual

- Bola de Prata: 2024
