= 2026 Copa do Brasil de Futebol Feminino =

2026 Copa do Brasil Feminina
Tournament details
- Country: Brazil
- Dates: 22 April – 15 November
- Teams: 66

Final positions
- Champions: Internacional (1st title)
- Runners-up: Flamengo

Tournament statistics
- Matches played: 71
- Goals scored: 194 (2.73 per match)

The 2026 Copa do Brasil de Futebol Feminino (officially the Copa do Brasil Feminina 2026) was the 12th edition of Brazil's Copa do Brasil de Futebol Feminino, and the second edition as an official domestic cup. It was held from 22 April to 15 November 2026.

A total of 66 teams competed in the tournament, having qualified by participating in the 2026 Série A1, 2026 Série A2 or 2026 Série A3. Palmeiras were the defending champions, but they were eliminated in the round of 32.

== Qualified teams ==
All 66 clubs from the three national divisions (Série A1, Série A2 and Série A3) qualified to the competition.

Red teams entered the competition in the preliminary round. Yellow teams entered in the first round. Blue teams entered in the second round. Green teams entered in the third round.

Association	Team	Qualification method
(Acre (state)) Acre	Galvez	2026 Série A3
Alagoas	UDA	2026 Série A2
Alagoas	Guarani de Paripueira	2026 Série A3
Amapá	Portuguesa	2026 Série A3
Amapá	Ypiranga	2026 Série A3
(Amazonas (Brazilian state)) Amazonas	3B da Amazônia	2026 Série A2
(Amazonas (Brazilian state)) Amazonas	Itacoatiara	2026 Série A2
(Amazonas (Brazilian state)) Amazonas	Penarol	2026 Série A3
Bahia	Bahia	2026 Série A1
Bahia	Vitória	2026 Série A1
Bahia	Doce Mel/Jequié EC	2026 Série A2
Bahia	Atlético de Alagoinhas	2026 Série A3
Ceará	Ceará	2026 Série A2
Ceará	R4	2026 Série A3
(Federal District (Brazil)) Distrito Federal	Minas Brasília	2026 Série A2
(Federal District (Brazil)) Distrito Federal	CRESSPOM	2026 Série A3
Espírito Santo	Prosperidade	2026 Série A3
Goiás	Vila Nova/UNIVERSO	2026 Série A2
Goiás	Planalto	2026 Série A3
Maranhão	Sampaio Corrêa	2026 Série A3
Mato Grosso	Mixto	2026 Série A1
Mato Grosso	Ação	2026 Série A2
Mato Grosso	Várzea Grande	2026 Série A3
Mato Grosso do Sul	Pantanal	2026 Série A3
Minas Gerais	América Mineiro	2026 Série A1
Minas Gerais	Atlético Mineiro	2026 Série A1
Minas Gerais	Cruzeiro	2026 Série A1
Minas Gerais	Itabirito	2026 Série A2
Minas Gerais	Araguari	2026 Série A3
Pará	Paysandu	2026 Série A2
Pará	Remo	2026 Série A3
Pará	Tiradentes	2026 Série A3
Paraíba	Mixto	2026 Série A3
(Paraná (state)) Paraná	Coritiba	2026 Série A3
Pernambuco	Sport	2026 Série A2
Pernambuco	Ipojuca	2026 Série A3
Piauí	Atlético Piauiense	2026 Série A2
Piauí	Liga São João/Piripiri	2026 Série A3
(Rio de Janeiro (state)) Rio de Janeiro	Botafogo	2026 Série A1
(Rio de Janeiro (state)) Rio de Janeiro	Flamengo	2026 Série A1
(Rio de Janeiro (state)) Rio de Janeiro	Fluminense	2026 Série A1
(Rio de Janeiro (state)) Rio de Janeiro	Pérolas Negras	2026 Série A2
(Rio de Janeiro (state)) Rio de Janeiro	Vasco da Gama	2026 Série A2
(Rio de Janeiro (state)) Rio de Janeiro	Real HEIPS	2026 Série A3
Rio Grande do Norte	União	2026 Série A3
Rio Grande do Sul	Grêmio	2026 Série A1
Rio Grande do Sul	Internacional	2026 Série A1
Rio Grande do Sul	Juventude	2026 Série A1
Rio Grande do Sul	Brasil de Farroupilha	2026 Série A3
Rondônia	Itapuense	2026 Série A3
Rondônia	Rolim de Moura	2026 Série A3
Roraima	Rio Negro	2026 Série A2
Roraima	São Raimundo	2026 Série A3
(Santa Catarina (state)) Santa Catarina	Criciúma	2026 Série A3
(São Paulo (state)) São Paulo	Corinthians	2026 Série A1
(São Paulo (state)) São Paulo	Ferroviária	2026 Série A1
(São Paulo (state)) São Paulo	Palmeiras	2026 Série A1
(São Paulo (state)) São Paulo	Red Bull Bragantino	2026 Série A1
(São Paulo (state)) São Paulo	Santos	2026 Série A1
(São Paulo (state)) São Paulo	São Paulo	2026 Série A1
(São Paulo (state)) São Paulo	AD Taubaté	2026 Série A2
(São Paulo (state)) São Paulo	Mauaense	2026 Série A3
(São Paulo (state)) São Paulo	Realidade Jovem	2026 Série A3
(São Paulo (state)) São Paulo	São José	2026 Série A3
Sergipe	Juventude	2026 Série A3
Tocantins	Paraíso	2026 Série A3

== Format ==
All rounds were played in a single-elimination tournament. The four teams with the lowest 2026 Women's Club Ranking competing in the 2026 Série A3 played in the preliminary round. The winners of the preliminary round, the remaining Série A3 teams, and the two teams with the lowest 2026 Women's Club Ranking participating in the 2026 Série A2 played in the first round. The first-round winners, the remaining Série A2 teams, and the two teams with the lowest 2026 Women's Club Ranking participating in the 2026 Série A1 played in the second round. The second-round winners and the remaining Série A1 teams played in the third round (round of 32).

The preliminary round and the first four rounds were played on a single-leg basis. The quarter-finals, semi-finals and finals, however, were played on a two-legged, home-and-away basis. If a single-leg group was tied, a penalty shootout would be used to determine the winners. For a two-legged group, a penalty shootout would be used if the aggregate score was tied.

== Preliminary round ==
The draw for the preliminary round was held on 23 March 2026, 14:00 at CBF headquarters in Rio de Janeiro. The four teams with the lowest 2026 Women's Club Ranking participating in the 2026 Série A3 were drawn into a single group. As eleven of the participating teams were not ranked in the 2026 Club Ranking, they were allocated according to the 2026 Federation Ranking instead. The lowest-ranked teams were therefore those from Piauí, Maranhão, Mato Grosso do Sul and Amapá, whose corresponding teams were:

Preliminary round teams
- (Piauí) Liga São João/Piripiri (no rank)
- (Maranhão) Sampaio Corrêa (no rank)
- (Mato Grosso do Sul) Pantanal (no rank)
- (Amapá) Portuguesa (no rank)

The matches were played on 22–23 April 2026.

=== Matches ===
22 April 2026 Group 2	Pantanal (Mato Grosso do Sul)	1–1 (6–7 p)	(Piauí) Liga São João/Piripiri	Campo Grande
20:00	Emanuelle Cristaldo 36'	Report	Livia Figueira 46'	Stadium: Jacques da Luz; Referee: Adeli Mara Monteiro (São Paulo)
	Penalties
	Milena de Paula (penalty scored); Vanice (penalty missed); Camila Belém (penalty missed); Sabrina Kathleen (penalty scored); Gabrielle Jesus (penalty scored); Silvani (penalty scored); Isabela Ribeiro (penalty scored); Carolzinha (penalty scored); Hericka Sorriso (penalty missed)		(penalty scored) Livia Figueira; (penalty missed) Eduarda Falcão; (penalty scored) Jaynne Santos; (penalty scored) Bruninha; (penalty missed) Vanessa; (penalty scored) Ana Maranhão; (penalty scored) Valeria Silva; (penalty scored) Jhenefer; (penalty scored) Duh Ramos

23 April 2026 Group 1	Sampaio Corrêa (Maranhão)	3–2	(Amapá) Portuguesa	São Luís
15:30	Mykaela 1'; Lara Mariana 59' (pen.); Islaeny 64'	Report	Rafa Marajó 35'; Juh 90+3'	Stadium: Nhozinho Santos; Referee: Amarília Sampaio Coelho (Ceará)

== First round ==
The draw for the first round was held on 23 March 2026, 14:00 at CBF headquarters in Rio de Janeiro. The preliminary round winners, the remaining Série A3 teams and the two teams with the lowest 2026 Women's Club Ranking participating in the 2026 Série A2 (Pérolas Negras and Itabirito) were drawn in a single group. The teams (2026 CBF ranking shown in parentheses) were:

First round teams
(São Paulo (state)) São José (21); (Pará) Remo (32); (Federal District (Brazil)) CRESSPOM (33); (São Paulo (state)) Realidade Jovem (38); (Paraná (state)) Coritiba (46); (Amapá) Ypiranga (47); (Rio Grande do Sul) Brasil de Farroupilha (49); (Rio Grande do Norte) União (53)	(Santa Catarina (state)) Criciúma (55); (Paraíba) Mixto (56); (Roraima) São Raimundo (57); (Rio de Janeiro (state)) Pérolas Negras (58); (Tocantins) Paraíso (62); (Minas Gerais) Itabirito (66); (Pernambuco) Ipojuca (67); (Sergipe) Juventude (69)	(Rondônia) Rolim de Moura (70); (Espírito Santo) Prosperidade (72); (Acre (state)) Galvez (73); (Bahia) Atlético de Alagoinhas (75); (Mato Grosso) Várzea Grande (75); (Alagoas) Guarani de Paripueira (75); (Ceará) R4 (84); (São Paulo (state)) Mauaense (no rank)	(Rio de Janeiro (state)) Real HEIPS (no rank); (Minas Gerais) Araguari (no rank); (Amazonas (Brazilian state)) Penarol (no rank); (Pará) Tiradentes (no rank); (Goiás) Planalto (no rank); (Rondônia) Itapuense (no rank); (Piauí) Liga São João/Piripiri^{[a]} (no rank); (Maranhão) Sampaio Corrêa^{[a]} (no rank)

^{a} The draw was held before the identities of Group 1 winners (Sampaio Corrêa) and Group 2 winners (Liga São João/Piripiri) were known.

The matches were played between 28 April and 7 May 2026.

=== Matches ===
28 April 2026 Group 6	Araguari (Minas Gerais)	5–2	(Rondônia) Itapuense	Santa Luzia
15:00	Malu 23'; Gisele Costa 56'; Ana Bia 60' (pen.), 65', 72'	Report	Rayane 67'; Laisla Tatah 69'	Stadium: Arena Frimisa; Referee: Jéssica Aparecida Milani (São Paulo)

28 April 2026 Group 8	Galvez (Acre (state))	1–5	(Rio Grande do Norte) União	Rio Branco
19:00	Rosalia 20'	Report	Gabi 11' (pen.); Dudinha 36'; Gi 49'; Priscila 72'; Mari 73'	Stadium: Antônio Aquino Lopes; Referee: Vanessa de Souza Guijansque (Espírito Santo)

29 April 2026 Group 5	CRESSPOM (Federal District (Brazil))	0–1	(Sergipe) Juventude	Gama
15:00		Report	Lais Fernanda 90+1'	Stadium: Bezerrão; Referee: Elizabete Esmeralda Cordeiro dos Santos Gomes (Ceará)

29 April 2026 Group 7	Ipojuca (Pernambuco)	2–1	(Pará) Remo	Camaragibe
15:00	Íris 44'; Marcelinha 90+4'	Report	Natália Musa 64'	Stadium: CT do Retrô; Referee: Mariana Regina de Paiva Oliveira (Rio Grande do Norte)

29 April 2026 Group 9	São Raimundo (Roraima)	0–1	(Rio de Janeiro (state)) Real HEIPS	Boa Vista
15:00		Report	Dayane 43'	Stadium: Canarinho; Referee: Adeli Mara Monteiro (São Paulo)

29 April 2026 Group 11	Realidade Jovem (São Paulo (state))	1–2	(Minas Gerais) Itabirito	São José do Rio Preto
15:00	Dig 47'	Report	Juliana Faria 38'; Bruna Victória 56'	Stadium: Teixeirão; Referee: Sâmia Kelle de Amorim Alves (Rio de Janeiro)

29 April 2026 Group 12	Coritiba (Paraná (state))	1–0	(Paraíba) Mixto	Colombo
15:00	Camylle Pécla 90'	Report		Stadium: CT da Graciosa; Referee: Jaqueline Blasius (Santa Catarina)

29 April 2026 Group 14	Criciúma (Santa Catarina (state))	0–0 (5–4 p)	(Ceará) R4	Criciúma
15:00		Report		Stadium: CT do Criciúma; Referee: Ana Caroline D'Eleutério de Sousa Carvalho (São Paulo)
	Penalties
	Duda Moura (penalty scored); Greice Behm (penalty scored); Miriam Werle (penalty scored); Maria Bortolotto (penalty scored); Luana Napoli (penalty scored)		(penalty scored) Fabiana; (penalty scored) Vitória; (penalty scored) Maria Alane; (penalty scored) Thallita; (penalty missed) Emylle Laís

29 April 2026 Group 16	Guarani de Paripueira (Alagoas)	3–4	(São Paulo (state)) São José	São Miguel dos Campos
15:00	Andressa Silva 65'; Fábia 74'; Maria Eduarda 88'	Report	Maria Veras 2'; Thais Mello 19'; Sarah Santos 30'; Yaya 48'	Stadium: Municipal Manoel Ferreira de Amorim; Referee: Amarília Sampaio Coelho (Ceará)

29 April 2026 Group 17	Sampaio Corrêa (Maranhão)	2–1	(Mato Grosso) Várzea Grande	São Luís
15:00	Cilene 45+2'; Lara Mariana 67' (pen.)	Report	Tânia Maranhão 55'	Stadium: Nhozinho Santos; Referee: Talita Ximenes de Freitas (São Paulo)

29 April 2026 Group 18	Tiradentes (Pará)	2–4	(Goiás) Planalto	Augusto Corrêa
15:00	Laila 37'; Silvane 45+5'	Report	Jhulian 17'; Sabryna 25'; Thainã 56'; Marcelly Vale 59'	Stadium: Municipal Francisco Paulo Tavares Silva; Referee: Gisele Ferreira da Silva (Maranhão)

29 April 2026 Group 10	Penarol (Amazonas (Brazilian state))	3–0; Awarded (Note: Atlético de Alagoinhas refused to play, resulting in Penarol being awarded a 3–0 walkover victory.)	(Bahia) Atlético de Alagoinhas	Itacoatiara
16:00		Report		Stadium: Floro de Mendonça; Referee: Fabrina Diordia Figueiredo Flexa (Pará)

29 April 2026 Group 15	Rolim de Moura (Rondônia)	1–1 (0–3 p)	(São Paulo (state)) Mauaense	Rolim de Moura
16:30	Tatiane 7'	Report	Larissa 41' (pen.)	Stadium: Municipal José Ângelo Cassol; Referee: Daniele Bispo Rodrigues (Maranhão)
	Penalties
	Jéssica (penalty missed); Tatiane (penalty missed); Thay Santos (penalty missed)		(penalty scored) Larissa; (penalty scored) Milena Oliveira; (penalty scored) Ana Clara

29 April 2026 Group 3	Paraíso (Tocantins)	1–1 (2–3 p)	(Amapá) Ypiranga	Paraíso do Tocantins
18:00	Sebá 43' (pen.)	Report	Fernanda 39'	Stadium: Municipal Antônio Damião; Referee: Cássia França de Souza (Distrito Federal)
	Penalties
	Tauana (penalty scored); Isabrenda (penalty missed); Leticia (penalty missed); Esquerdinha (penalty scored); Sebá (penalty missed); Ane Caroline (penalty missed)		(penalty missed) Thayna; (penalty scored) Makolly; (penalty missed) Fernanda; (penalty scored) Karla; (penalty missed) Neném; (penalty scored) Karol

29 April 2026 Group 4	Prosperidade (Espírito Santo)	0–0 (4–3 p)	(Rio Grande do Sul) Brasil de Farroupilha	Vargem Alta
19:00		Report		Stadium: Municipal Almiro Ofranti; Referee: Jéssica Lorrany da Silva (Minas Gerais)
	Penalties
	Anna (penalty missed); Michelle (penalty scored); Vitória Arrasca (penalty scored); Ronaldinha (penalty scored); Laura Marin (penalty scored)		(penalty scored) Gabizinha; (penalty missed) Tayla Roncato; (penalty scored) Yasmin Oliveira; (penalty scored) Maju; (penalty missed) Karoline Oliveira

7 May 2026 (Note: The match, originally scheduled to be played on 29 April 2026, 15:00 was rescheduled for 7 May 2026, 15:00 after eleven Liga São João/Piripiri players were diagnosed with influenza A.) Group 13	Pérolas Negras (Rio de Janeiro (state))	1–1 (3–4 p)	(Piauí) Liga São João/Piripiri	Rio de Janeiro
15:00	Sofia Sena 87'	Report	Duh Ramos 53'	Stadium: Ronaldo Luis Nazário de Lima; Referee: Juliana Caroline de Ângelo (Paraná)
	Penalties
	Sofia Sena (penalty missed); Mariana (penalty scored); Lívia Vidal (penalty missed); Jeniffer (penalty scored); Jamilly (penalty scored); Sarah Oliveira (penalty missed)		(penalty missed) Livia Figueira; (penalty scored) Bruninha; (penalty scored) Amanda Castro; (penalty missed) Alice Soares; (penalty scored) Gabi; (penalty scored) Valeria Silva

== Second round ==
The draw for the second round was held on 4 May 2026, 16:00 at CBF headquarters in Rio de Janeiro. The first round winners, the remaining Série A2 teams and the two teams with the lowest 2026 Women's Club Ranking participating in the 2026 Série A1 (Mixto and Vitória) were drawn in a single group. The teams (2026 CBF ranking shown in parentheses) were:

Second round teams
(Pernambuco) Sport (17); (Amazonas (Brazilian state)) 3B da Amazônia (20); (São Paulo (state)) São José (21); (Federal District (Brazil)) Minas Brasília (23); (Amazonas (Brazilian state)) Itacoatiara (24); (Mato Grosso) Mixto (25); (São Paulo (state)) AD Taubaté (26); (Rio de Janeiro (state)) Vasco da Gama (27)	(Alagoas) UDA (29); Ceará (30); (Bahia) Vitória (31); (Bahia) Doce Mel/Jequié EC (34); (Goiás) Vila Nova/UNIVERSO (35); (Mato Grosso) Ação (40); (Pará) Paysandu (41); (Roraima) Rio Negro (42)	(Piauí) Atlético Piauiense (43); (Paraná (state)) Coritiba (46); (Amapá) Ypiranga (47); (Rio Grande do Norte) União (53); (Santa Catarina (state)) Criciúma (55); (Minas Gerais) Itabirito (66); (Pernambuco) Ipojuca (67); (Sergipe) Juventude (69)	(Espírito Santo) Prosperidade (72); (São Paulo (state)) Mauaense (no rank); (Rio de Janeiro (state)) Real HEIPS (no rank); (Minas Gerais) Araguari (no rank); (Amazonas (Brazilian state)) Penarol (no rank); (Goiás) Planalto (no rank); (Piauí) Liga São João/Piripiri^{[b]} (no rank); (Maranhão) Sampaio Corrêa (no rank)

^{b} The draw was held before the identity of Group 13 winners (Liga São João/Piripiri) was known.

The matches were played from 12 to 27 May 2026.

=== Matches ===
12 May 2026 Group 28	Vasco da Gama (Rio de Janeiro (state))	5–1	(Minas Gerais) Araguari	Rio de Janeiro
18:30	Larissa Ramos 11'; Vilmara Braga 34' (pen.); Fernanda Marcela 38'; Tefah 41'; Mayara 81'	Report	Ana Bia 68' (pen.)	Stadium: Luso Brasileiro; Referee: Talita Ximenes de Freitas (São Paulo)

13 May 2026 Group 19	São José (São Paulo (state))	1–1 (7–6 p)	(Espírito Santo) Prosperidade	São José dos Campos
15:00	Yaya 45'	Report	Alessandra Russinha 90+2'	Stadium: Martins Pereira; Referee: Adriana Costa Farias (Amazonas)
	Penalties
	Maria Cristina (penalty missed); Yorrana (penalty scored); Emilyn Hass (penalty scored); Sabrina Souza (penalty scored); Thais Mello (penalty scored); Larissa Munhoz (penalty scored); Alissa Alves (penalty scored); Lívia (penalty scored)		(penalty scored) Michelle; (penalty scored) Vitória Arrasca; (penalty scored) Ronaldinha; (penalty scored) Duda Gurgel; (penalty missed) Alessandra Russinha; (penalty scored) Mística; (penalty scored) Rosy; (penalty missed) Vitória Baiana

13 May 2026 Group 23	AD Taubaté (São Paulo (state))	0–1	(Amazonas (Brazilian state)) 3B da Amazônia	Taubaté
15:00		Report	Paulinha 22'	Stadium: Joaquinzão; Referee: Elizabete Esmeralda Cordeiro dos Santos Gomes (Ceará)

13 May 2026 Group 26	União (Rio Grande do Norte)	0–0 (3–4 p)	(Piauí) Atlético Piauiense	Natal
15:00		Report		Stadium: Arena das Dunas; Referee: Amarília Sampaio Coelho (Ceará)
	Penalties
	Gabi (penalty missed); Dany Rezende (penalty scored); Priscila (penalty scored); Aninha (penalty missed); Letícia Xing (penalty scored); Mayara Shakira (penalty missed)		(penalty scored) Natalinha; (penalty scored) Duda Pedra; (penalty missed) Cris Karioka; (penalty missed) Tábatha Gaúcha; (penalty scored) Eduarda Balbino; (penalty scored) Claudia Steffany

13 May 2026 Group 27	Itabirito (Minas Gerais)	2–0	Ceará	Sete Lagoas
15:00	Bruna Victória 62'; Vânia Paz 86'	Report		Stadium: Arena do Jacaré; Referee: Andressa Hartmann (Rio Grande do Sul)

13 May 2026 Group 30	Mauaense (São Paulo (state))	Annulled (Note: On 22 May 2026, the Superior Tribunal de Justiça Desportiva (STJD) annulled the result of the Mauaense v Itacoatiara match on 13 May 2026, ordering that it be replayed. The STJD ruled that the match referee, Vanessa de Souza Guijansque, had incorrectly awarded a goal to Mauaense when the ball crossed the side netting and went in the goal. Mauaense had originally defeated Itacoatiara 1–0.)	(Amazonas (Brazilian state)) Itacoatiara	Mauá
15:00	Gabi Soares 14'	Report		Stadium: Pedro Benedetti; Referee: Vanessa de Souza Guijansque (Espírito Santo)

13 May 2026 Group 32	Sampaio Corrêa (Maranhão)	2–3	(Rio de Janeiro (state)) Real HEIPS	São Luís
15:00	Larissa 45+1'; Isabelle 72'	Report	Jade 22'; Jenifer 40', 44'	Stadium: Castelão; Referee: Eliane Nogueira dos Santos (Roraima)

13 May 2026 Group 33	UDA (Alagoas)	4–1	(Amapá) Ypiranga	São Miguel dos Campos
15:00	Melissa 21'; Jack Santos 32' (pen.); Olga Nallana 67', 78'	Report	Paula 2'	Stadium: Municipal Manoel Ferreira de Amorim; Referee: Gisele Ferreira da Silva (Maranhão)

13 May 2026 Group 34	Coritiba (Paraná (state))	3–1	(Roraima) Rio Negro	Colombo
15:00	Iasmyn 5'; Brendha Patrícia 58'; Thamirys 67'	Report	Vaneza 7'	Stadium: CT da Graciosa; Referee: Karina Carvalho Rocha (Mato Grosso do Sul)

13 May 2026 Group 20	Liga São João/Piripiri (Piauí)	7–0	(Pernambuco) Ipojuca	Piripiri
16:00	Bruninha 26', 83'; Jaynne Santos 29'; Amanda Castro 31'; Livia Figueira 43', 45'; Eduarda Falcão 74'	Report		Stadium: Arena Ytacoatiara; Referee: Jady Jesus Caldas (Bahia)

13 May 2026 Group 24	Penarol (Amazonas (Brazilian state))	1–2	(Bahia) Doce Mel/Jequié EC	Itacoatiara
16:00	Cecília 33'	Report	Jéssica César 2'; Flávia Helena 36' (pen.)	Stadium: Floro de Mendonça; Referee: Suanny Aires de Sousa (Pará)

13 May 2026 Group 21	Mixto (Mato Grosso)	0–1	(Mato Grosso) Ação	Cuiabá
19:00		Report	Natasha Sorriso 34'	Stadium: Eurico Gaspar Dutra; Referee: Thayslane de Melo Costa (Sergipe)

13 May 2026 Group 22	Minas Brasília (Federal District (Brazil))	1–0	(Goiás) Vila Nova/UNIVERSO	Gama
19:00	Rayla 8'	Report		Stadium: Bezerrão; Referee: Rejane Caetano da Silva (Ceará)

13 May 2026 Group 25	Planalto (Goiás)	1–1 (4–2 p)	(Pará) Paysandu	Aparecida de Goiânia
19:00	Marcelly Vale 58' (pen.)	Report	Alessandra Rato 32'	Stadium: Annibal Batista de Toledo; Referee: Jéssica Aparecida Milani (São Paulo)
	Penalties
	Idalana (penalty scored); Jhemmily (penalty scored); Marcelly Vale (penalty missed); Sabryna (penalty scored); Duda Fonseca (penalty scored)		(penalty missed) Nanda Silva; (penalty scored) Letícia Pantoja; (penalty scored) Andrea Botelho; (penalty missed) Danny

13 May 2026 Group 31	Sport (Pernambuco)	3–0	(Santa Catarina (state)) Criciúma	Recife
19:00	Andreza 4'; Evinha 45'; Zai Miúda 81'	Report		Stadium: Ilha do Retiro; Referee: Adeli Mara Monteiro (São Paulo)

14 May 2026 Group 29	Juventude (Sergipe)	2–3	(Bahia) Vitória	Itabaiana
15:00	Laís Fernanda 25', 63'	Report	Milena Monteiro 8'; Bárbara 14'; Sheila 82'	Stadium: Etelvino Mendonça; Referee: Mariana Regina de Paiva Oliveira (Rio Grande do Norte)

==== Replay ====
27 May 2026 Group 30	Mauaense (São Paulo (state))	3–0	(Amazonas (Brazilian state)) Itacoatiara	Mauá
15:00	Larissa 45+3', 63' (pen.); Milena Oliveira 85'	Report		Stadium: Pedro Benedetti; Referee: Francielly Fernanda Lima de Castro (Minas Gerais)

== Round of 32 ==
The draw for the round of 32 was held on 15 May 2026, 15:00 at CBF headquarters in Rio de Janeiro. The second round winners and the remaining Série A1 teams were drawn in a single group. The teams (2026 CBF ranking shown in parentheses) were:

Round of 32 teams
(São Paulo (state)) Corinthians (1); (São Paulo (state)) Palmeiras (2); (São Paulo (state)) Ferroviária (3); (São Paulo (state)) São Paulo (4); (Rio Grande do Sul) Internacional (5); (São Paulo (state)) Red Bull Bragantino (6); (Rio de Janeiro (state)) Flamengo (7); Bahia (8)	(Minas Gerais) Cruzeiro (9); (Rio Grande do Sul) Grêmio (10); (São Paulo (state)) Santos (12); (Rio de Janeiro (state)) Fluminense (13); (Minas Gerais) América Mineiro (14); (Minas Gerais) Atlético Mineiro (15); (Pernambuco) Sport (17); (Rio de Janeiro (state)) Botafogo (18)	(Rio Grande do Sul) Juventude (19); (Amazonas (Brazilian state)) 3B da Amazônia (20); (São Paulo (state)) São José (21); (Federal District (Brazil)) Minas Brasília (23); (Rio de Janeiro (state)) Vasco da Gama (27); (Alagoas) UDA (29); (Bahia) Vitória (31); (Bahia) Doce Mel/Jequié EC (34)	(Mato Grosso) Ação (40); (Piauí) Atlético Piauiense (43); (Paraná (state)) Coritiba (46); (Minas Gerais) Itabirito (66); (São Paulo (state)) Mauaense^{[c]} (no rank); (Rio de Janeiro (state)) Real HEIPS (no rank); (Goiás) Planalto (no rank); (Piauí) Liga São João/Piripiri (no rank)

^{c} Initially, Mauaense were drawn in Group 50. However, one week later, the STJD ordered a replay of the second-round match between Mauaense and Itacoatiara. Mauaense won the replay and secured their place in Group 50.

The matches were played between 27 May and 6 July 2026.

=== Matches ===
27 May 2026 Group 37	Real HEIPS (Rio de Janeiro (state))	0–2	(Paraná (state)) Coritiba	Rio de Janeiro
15:00		Report	Brendha Patrícia 34'; Júlia D'Oliveira 84'	Stadium: Rua Bariri; Referee: Ruthyanna Camila Medeiros da Silva (Paraíba)

27 May 2026 Group 47	São José (São Paulo (state))	1–4	(São Paulo (state)) Red Bull Bragantino	São José dos Campos
15:00	Yaya 84'	Report	Del Trecco 7', 51'; Mylena Pedroso 47'; Carol Tavares 62'	Stadium: Martins Pereira; Referee: Sabrina da Silva Gomes Elino (Rio de Janeiro)

27 May 2026 Group 42	Botafogo (Rio de Janeiro (state))	3–0	(Rio Grande do Sul) Juventude	Rio de Janeiro
15:30	Fretes 5' (o.g.); Júllia Moreira 66', 69'	Report		Stadium: Olímpico Nilton Santos; Referee: Jéssica Aparecida Milani (São Paulo)

27 May 2026 Group 46	3B da Amazônia (Amazonas (Brazilian state))	2–0	(Mato Grosso) Ação	Manaus
16:30	Carol Firmino 17' (pen.); Maria Vitória 90+1'	Report		Stadium: Ismael Benigno; Referee: Suanny Aires de Sousa (Pará)

27 May 2026 Group 49	Internacional (Rio Grande do Sul)	0–0 (4–2 p)	(Rio Grande do Sul) Grêmio	Porto Alegre
18:30		Report		Stadium: Beira-Rio; Referee: Edina Alves Batista (São Paulo)
	Penalties
	Débora (penalty scored); Joana (penalty scored); Alice Goedert (penalty scored); Bianca Martins (penalty missed); Caty (penalty scored)		(penalty missed) Camila Pini; (penalty scored) Brenda Woch; (penalty missed) Leidiane; (penalty scored) Amanda Brunner

27 May 2026 Group 38	Fluminense (Rio de Janeiro (state))	2–0	(Federal District (Brazil)) Minas Brasília	Rio de Janeiro
19:00	Kaline 26', 47'	Report		Stadium: Luso Brasileiro; Referee: Karina Carvalho Rocha (Mato Grosso do Sul)

27 May 2026 Group 41	Liga São João/Piripiri (Piauí)	0–2	(Rio de Janeiro (state)) Flamengo	Piripiri
19:00		Report	Cristiane 19' (pen.); Flávia Mota 43'	Stadium: Arena Ytacoatiara; Referee: Adeli Mara Monteiro (São Paulo)

27 May 2026 Group 39	Planalto (Goiás)	0–1	Bahia	Aparecida de Goiânia
19:30		Report	Carballo 47'	Stadium: Annibal Batista de Toledo; Referee: Ana Caroline D'Eleutério de Sousa Carvalho (São Paulo)

27 May 2026 Group 44	Itabirito (Minas Gerais)	2–1	(Pernambuco) Sport	Sete Lagoas
20:00	Bruna Marques 62'; Ary Moura 75'	Report	Juju Freitas 90+2'	Stadium: Arena do Jacaré; Referee: Andressa Hartmann (Rio Grande do Sul)

28 May 2026 Group 35	Atlético Mineiro (Minas Gerais)	3–1	(Bahia) Vitória	Belo Horizonte
16:00	Pimenta 2', 54'; Thalita Lacerda 84'	Report	Mariana Pires 9'	Stadium: Arena MRV; Referee: Sâmia Kelle de Amorim Alves (Rio de Janeiro)

28 May 2026 Group 40	Atlético Piauiense (Piauí)	1–1 (5–4 p)	(São Paulo (state)) Santos	Teresina
16:00	Natalinha 78'	Report	Carol Baiana 60'	Stadium: Lindolfo Monteiro; Referee: Thayslane de Melo Costa (Sergipe)
	Penalties
	Natalinha (penalty scored); Edilene França (penalty scored); Letícia Pires (penalty scored); Quintana (penalty scored); Claudia Steffany (penalty scored)		(penalty scored) Analuyza; (penalty scored) Larroquette; (penalty scored) Rafa Martins; (penalty scored) Nath Pitbull; (penalty missed) Rincón

28 May 2026 Group 43	Ferroviária (São Paulo (state))	8–0	(Alagoas) UDA	Rio Claro
17:00	Rhaissa 11', 41'; Grazy 17'; Monique 20', 55', 80'; Micaelly 34'; Kédima 86'	Report		Stadium: Benito Agnelo Castellano; Referee: Amarília Sampaio Coelho (Ceará)

28 May 2026 Group 48	Vasco da Gama (Rio de Janeiro (state))	1–0	(Minas Gerais) América Mineiro	Rio de Janeiro
18:00	Vick 85'	Report		Stadium: Luso Brasileiro; Referee: Elizabete Esmeralda Cordeiro dos Santos Gomes (Ceará)

28 May 2026 Group 45	Cruzeiro (Minas Gerais)	5–0	(Bahia) Doce Mel/Jequié EC	Sete Lagoas
18:30	Paloma Maciel 29'; Marília Furiel 52'; Pri Back 61'; Letícia Ferreira 85'; Byanca Brasil 90+3' (pen.)	Report		Stadium: Arena do Jacaré; Referee: Talita Ximenes de Freitas (São Paulo)

30 May 2026 Group 36	Palmeiras (São Paulo (state))	0–1	(São Paulo (state)) Corinthians	São Paulo
11:00		Report	Gabi Zanotti 88'	Stadium: Nubank Parque; Referee: Daiane Muniz (São Paulo)

6 July 2026 Group 50	Mauaense (São Paulo (state))	0–3	(São Paulo (state)) São Paulo	Mauá
15:00		Report	Tayla 38' (pen.); Carol Gil 66'; Aline Milene 85'	Stadium: Pedro Benedetti; Referee: Adeli Mara Monteiro (São Paulo)

== Round of 16 ==
The draw for the round of 16 was held on 15 June 2026, 15:00 at CBF headquarters in Rio de Janeiro. The 16 qualified teams from the round of 32 were drawn in a single group. The teams (2026 CBF ranking shown in parentheses) were:

Round of 16 teams
(São Paulo (state)) Corinthians (1); (São Paulo (state)) Ferroviária (3); (São Paulo (state)) São Paulo (4); (Rio Grande do Sul) Internacional (5); (São Paulo (state)) Red Bull Bragantino (6); (Rio de Janeiro (state)) Flamengo (7); Bahia (8); (Minas Gerais) Cruzeiro (9)	(Rio de Janeiro (state)) Fluminense (13); (Minas Gerais) Atlético Mineiro (15); (Rio de Janeiro (state)) Botafogo (18); (Amazonas (Brazilian state)) 3B da Amazônia (20); (Rio de Janeiro (state)) Vasco da Gama (27); (Piauí) Atlético Piauiense (43); (Paraná (state)) Coritiba (46); (Minas Gerais) Itabirito (66)

^{d} The draw was held before the identity of Group 50 winners (São Paulo) was known.

The matches were played between 20 and 22 July 2026.

=== Matches ===
20 July 2026 Group 56	Coritiba (Paraná (state))	0–1	(Rio Grande do Sul) Internacional	Curitiba
16:00		Report	Jaimes 45'	Stadium: Couto Pereira; Referee: Adeli Mara Monteiro (São Paulo)

20 July 2026 Group 52	Flamengo (Rio de Janeiro (state))	1–0	(Amazonas (Brazilian state)) 3B da Amazônia	Rio de Janeiro
19:00	Fernanda 23'	Report		Stadium: Luso Brasileiro; Referee: Andreza Helena de Siqueira (Minas Gerais)

20 July 2026 Group 54	Ferroviária (São Paulo (state))	1–0	(São Paulo (state)) Corinthians	Araraquara
20:00	Andressa 14'	Report		Stadium: Fonte Luminosa; Referee: Jéssica Aparecida Milani (São Paulo)

21 July 2026 Group 51	Fluminense (Rio de Janeiro (state))	2–1	(Minas Gerais) Cruzeiro	Rio de Janeiro
16:30	Kamilla Sotero 79'; Lelê 90'	Report	Pri Back 78'	Stadium: Luso Brasileiro; Referee: Ruthyanna Camila Medeiros da Silva (Paraíba)

21 July 2026 Group 57	Itabirito (Minas Gerais)	0–1	Bahia	Sete Lagoas
20:00		Report	Gómez 61'	Stadium: Arena do Jacaré; Referee: Sâmia Kelle de Amorim Alves (Rio de Janeiro)

21 July 2026 Group 55	Vasco da Gama (Rio de Janeiro (state))	0–1	(São Paulo (state)) São Paulo	Volta Redonda
21:45		Report	Aline Milene 29'	Stadium: Raulino de Oliveira; Referee: Andressa Hartmann (Rio Grande do Sul)

22 July 2026 Group 53	Botafogo (Rio de Janeiro (state))	0–2	(São Paulo (state)) Red Bull Bragantino	Rio de Janeiro
19:00		Report	Ana Carla 68'; Lurdinha 79'	Stadium: Olímpico Nilton Santos; Referee: Suanny Aires de Sousa (Pará)

22 July 2026 Group 58	Atlético Mineiro (Minas Gerais)	2–1	(Piauí) Atlético Piauiense	Belo Horizonte
19:30	Laura Maria 23'; Pimenta 90+1'	Report	Nenê 90+3'	Stadium: Arena MRV; Referee: Eduarda Marcos (Paraná)

== Quarter-finals ==
The draw for the quarter-finals was held on 24 July 2026, 10:00 at CBF headquarters in Rio de Janeiro. The 8 qualified teams from the round of 16 were drawn in a single group. The teams (2026 CBF ranking shown in parentheses) were:

Quarter-finals teams
- (São Paulo (state)) Ferroviária (3)
- (São Paulo (state)) São Paulo (4)
- (Rio Grande do Sul) Internacional (5)
- (São Paulo (state)) Red Bull Bragantino (6)
- (Rio de Janeiro (state)) Flamengo (7)
- Bahia (8)
- (Rio de Janeiro (state)) Fluminense (13)
- (Minas Gerais) Atlético Mineiro (15)

The matches were played between 12 and 22 October 2026.

=== Matches ===
Team 1	Agg.	Team 2	1st leg	2nd leg
Flamengo (Rio de Janeiro (state))	4–3	(Rio de Janeiro (state)) Fluminense	1–2	3–1
Ferroviária (São Paulo (state))	3–4	(São Paulo (state)) Red Bull Bragantino	0–2	3–2
Internacional (Rio Grande do Sul)	1–1 (4–3 p)	(Minas Gerais) Atlético Mineiro	1–1	0–0
Bahia	3–1	(São Paulo (state)) São Paulo	2–1	1–0

==== Group 59 ====
15 October 2026
19:00

Flamengo (Rio de Janeiro (state))	1–2	(Rio de Janeiro (state)) Fluminense
Laysa 53'	Report	Nath Rodrigues 45'; Driely 63'

Luso Brasileiro, Rio de Janeiro
Referee: Andreza Helena de Siqueira (Minas Gerais)

22 October 2026
19:00

Fluminense (Rio de Janeiro (state))	1–3	(Rio de Janeiro (state)) Flamengo
Nath Rodrigues 82' (pen.)	Report	Jucinara 10'; Kaylane Vieira 19'; Laysa 33'

Luso Brasileiro, Rio de Janeiro
Referee: Thayslane de Melo Costa (Sergipe)

==== Group 60 ====
12 October 2026
18:00

Ferroviária (São Paulo (state))	0–2	(São Paulo (state)) Red Bull Bragantino
	Report	Duda Rodrigues 53'; Lurdinha 84'

Fonte Luminosa, Araraquara
Referee: Marianna Nanni Batalha (São Paulo)

20 October 2026
18:00

Red Bull Bragantino (São Paulo (state))	2–3	(São Paulo (state)) Ferroviária
Mylena Pedroso 13'; Duda Rodrigues 55'	Report	Fátima Dutra 11', 46'; Rhaissa 73'

Cícero de Souza Marques, Bragança Paulista
Referee: Gleika Oliveira Pinheiro (Pará)

==== Group 61 ====
14 October 2026
21:00

Internacional (Rio Grande do Sul)	1–1	(Minas Gerais) Atlético Mineiro
Caty 69' (pen.)	Report	Giovanna Barraca 2'

Beira-Rio, Porto Alegre
Referee: Rejane Caetano da Silva (Ceará)

20 October 2026
19:00

Atlético Mineiro (Minas Gerais)	0–0	(Rio Grande do Sul) Internacional
	Report
Penalties
Kaiuska (penalty scored); Hingredy (penalty scored); Giovanna Barraca (penalty missed); Laura Maria (penalty missed); Karen (penalty scored)	3–4	(penalty missed) Jaimes; (penalty scored) Julia Bianchi; (penalty scored) Débora; (penalty scored) Bianca Martins; (penalty scored) Caty

Arena MRV, Belo Horizonte
Referee: Ruthyanna Camila Medeiros da Silva (Paraíba)

==== Group 62 ====
16 October 2026
19:00

Bahia	2–1	(São Paulo (state)) São Paulo
Gómez 9'; Isa Fernandes 38'	Report	Késia Sena 47'

Batistão, Aracaju
Referee: Deborah Cecilia Cruz Correia (Pernambuco)

21 October 2026
19:00

São Paulo (São Paulo (state))	0–1	Bahia
	Report	Cássia 51'

Brinco de Ouro, Campinas
Referee: Tainan Bordignon Somensi (Santa Catarina)

== Semi-finals ==
The draw for the semi-finals was held on 23 October 2026, 15:00 at CBF headquarters in Rio de Janeiro. The 4 qualified teams from the quarter-finals were drawn in a single group (CBF ranking shown in parentheses).

Group
- (Rio Grande do Sul) Internacional (5)
- (São Paulo (state)) Red Bull Bragantino (6)
- (Rio de Janeiro (state)) Flamengo (7)
- Bahia (8)

The matches were played between 3 and 8 November 2026.

=== Matches ===
Team 1	Agg.	Team 2	1st leg	2nd leg
Bahia	2–3	(Rio de Janeiro (state)) Flamengo	0–0	2–3
Internacional (Rio Grande do Sul)	3–3 (5–4 p)	(São Paulo (state)) Red Bull Bragantino	3–1	0–2

==== Group 63 ====
3 November 2026
19:00

Bahia	0–0	(Rio de Janeiro (state)) Flamengo
	Report

Arena Fonte Nova, Salvador
Referee: Marianna Nanni Batalha (São Paulo)

7 November 2026
21:30

Flamengo (Rio de Janeiro (state))	3–2	Bahia
Núbia 3'; Fernanda 48'; Sandoval 83'	Report	Cássia 36' (pen.); Ellen Santana 87'

Luso Brasileiro, Rio de Janeiro
Referee: Francielly Fernanda Lima de Castro (Minas Gerais)

==== Group 64 ====
4 November 2026
19:30

Internacional (Rio Grande do Sul)	3–1	(São Paulo (state)) Red Bull Bragantino
Valéria Cantuário 12'; Lelê 29'; Jaimes 51' (pen.)	Report	Camila Ambrózio 90+2'

Beira-Rio, Porto Alegre
Referee: Tainan Bordignon Somensi (Santa Catarina)

8 November 2026
11:00

Red Bull Bragantino (São Paulo (state))	2–0	(Rio Grande do Sul) Internacional
Mylena Pedroso 76' (pen.); Jéssica Soares 85'	Report
Penalties
Jéssica Soares (penalty scored); Mylena Pedroso (penalty scored); Del Trecco (penalty scored); Rafa Mineira (penalty missed); Carol Tavares (penalty scored)	4–5	(penalty scored) Débora; (penalty scored) Aninha Régio; (penalty scored) Mayara Vaz; (penalty scored) Bianca Martins; (penalty scored) Caty

Cícero de Souza Marques, Bragança Paulista
Referee: Thayslane de Melo Costa (Sergipe)

== Final ==
The draw to determine which team would be the home team for each leg of the final was held on 9 November 2026, 12:00 at CBF headquarters in Rio de Janeiro. The finalists were drawn in a single group (CBF ranking shown in parentheses).

Group
- (Rio Grande do Sul) Internacional (5)
- (Rio de Janeiro (state)) Flamengo (7)

The matches were played on 11 and 15 November 2026.

==== Group 65 ====
11 November 2026
21:30

Flamengo (Rio de Janeiro (state))	1–3	(Rio Grande do Sul) Internacional
Letícia Oliveira 4'	Report	Valéria Cantuário 47'; Débora 67'; Jaimes 80'

Luso Brasileiro, Rio de Janeiro
Referee: Marianna Nanni Batalha (São Paulo)

15 November 2026
16:00

Internacional (Rio Grande do Sul)	1–0	(Rio de Janeiro (state)) Flamengo
Pati Llanos 57'	Report

Beira-Rio, Porto Alegre
Referee: Charly Wendy Straub Deretti (Santa Catarina)
