= 2022 Campeonato Brasileiro de Futebol Feminino Série A1 =

Campeonato Brasileiro de Futebol Feminino Série A1
- Season: 2022
- Dates: 4 March – 24 September 2022
- Champions: Corinthians (4th title)
- Relegated: CRESSPOM; ESMAC; Red Bull Bragantino; São José
- Copa Libertadores: Corinthians; Internacional; Palmeiras (via Copa Libertadores)
- Matches played: 134
- Goals scored: 392 (2.93 per match)
- Best Player: Duda Sampaio
- Top goalscorer: Cristiane (13 goals)
- Biggest home win: Santos 6–0 CRESSPOM; Group stage, R6, 18 April
- Biggest away win: CRESSPOM 1–7 Palmeiras; Group stage, R13, 19 June
- Highest scoring: 8 goals Santos 5–3 ESMAC; Group stage, R11, 5 June; CRESSPOM 1–7 Palmeiras; Group stage, R13, 19 June

The 2022 Campeonato Brasileiro Feminino A-1 (officially the Brasileirão Feminino Neoenergia 2022 for sponsorship reasons) was the 10th season of the Campeonato Brasileiro de Futebol Feminino Série A1, the top level of women's football in Brazil, and the 6th edition in a Série A1 since its establishment in 2016. The tournament was organized by the Brazilian Football Confederation (CBF). It started on 4 March and ended on 24 September 2022.

In the finals, the defending champions Corinthians won their fourth title after defeating Internacional 5–2 on aggregate.

CRESSPOM, ESMAC, Red Bull Bragantino and São José were relegated to the 2023 Série A2.

== Format ==
In the group stage, each team played once against the other fifteen teams. Top eight teams qualified for the final stages. Quarter-finals, semi-finals and finals were played on a home-and-away two-legged basis.

== Teams ==
Location of teams in 2022 Série A1 outside the state of São Paulo (in red).
Location of teams in 2022 Série A1 within the state of São Paulo.

Sixteen teams competed in the league – the top twelve teams from the previous season, as well as four teams promoted from the 2021 Série A2.

Pos.	Relegated from 2021 Série A1
13	Botafogo
14	Minas/ICESP
15	Napoli
16	Bahia

Pos.	Promoted from 2021 Série A2
1	Red Bull Bragantino
2	Atlético Mineiro
3	ESMAC
4	CRESSPOM

=== Number of teams by state ===
Number of teams	State	Team(s)
7	São Paulo	Corinthians, Ferroviária, Palmeiras, Red Bull Bragantino, Santos, São José and São Paulo
2	Distrito Federal	CRESSPOM and Real Brasília
2	Minas Gerais	Atlético Mineiro and Cruzeiro
2	Rio Grande do Sul	Grêmio and Internacional
1	Pará	ESMAC
1	Rio de Janeiro	Flamengo/Marinha
1	Santa Catarina	Avaí/Kindermann

== Stadiums and locations ==
Team	Location	Stadium	Capacity
(Minas Gerais) Atlético Mineiro	Belo Horizonte	SESC Alterosas	2,000
(Minas Gerais) Atlético Mineiro	Belo Horizonte	Arena Independência	23,018
(Minas Gerais) Atlético Mineiro	Belo Horizonte	Castor Cifuentes (Nova Lima)	5,160
(Santa Catarina (state)) Avaí/Kindermann	Caçador	Carlos Alberto da Costa Neves	6,500
(São Paulo (state)) Corinthians^{[a]}	São Paulo	Parque São Jorge	18,500
(São Paulo (state)) Corinthians^{[a]}	São Paulo	Neo Química Arena	47,605
(Federal District (Brazil)) CRESSPOM	Brasília	Maria de Lourdes Abadia (Ceilândia)	3,000
(Minas Gerais) Cruzeiro	Belo Horizonte	SESC Alterosas	2,000
(Pará) ESMAC	Ananindeua	Baenão (Belém)	12,000
(Pará) ESMAC	Ananindeua	Francisco Vasques (Belém)	4,900
(São Paulo (state)) Ferroviária	Araraquara	Fonte Luminosa	21,441
(Rio de Janeiro (state)) Flamengo/Marinha	Rio de Janeiro	Luso Brasileiro	4,697
(Rio de Janeiro (state)) Flamengo/Marinha	Rio de Janeiro	Estádio da Gávea	4,000
(Rio Grande do Sul) Grêmio^{[b]}	Porto Alegre	Antônio Vieira Ramos (Gravataí)	4,700
(Rio Grande do Sul) Grêmio^{[b]}	Porto Alegre	Aírton Ferreira da Silva (Eldorado do Sul)	1,500
(Rio Grande do Sul) Grêmio^{[b]}	Porto Alegre	Arena do Grêmio	55,662
(Rio Grande do Sul) Internacional^{[c]}	Porto Alegre	SESC Protásio Alves	2,800
(Rio Grande do Sul) Internacional^{[c]}	Porto Alegre	Beira-Rio	50,128
(São Paulo (state)) Palmeiras^{[d]}	São Paulo	Allianz Parque	43,713
(São Paulo (state)) Palmeiras^{[d]}	São Paulo	Estádio do Canindé	22,375
(Federal District (Brazil)) Real Brasília^{[e]}	Brasília	Ciro Machado do Espírito Santo	1,500
(São Paulo (state)) Red Bull Bragantino	Bragança Paulista	CFA Jarinu (Jarinu)	
(São Paulo (state)) Santos^{[f]}	Santos	Urbano Caldeira	21,732
(São Paulo (state)) São José	São José dos Campos	Martins Pereira	16,500
(São Paulo (state)) São Paulo^{[g]}	São Paulo	Marcelo Portugal Gouvêa (Cotia)	2,000
(São Paulo (state)) São Paulo^{[g]}	São Paulo	Estádio do Morumbi	77,011

^{a} Corinthians also played a home match at Estádio do Canindé (São Paulo).
^{b} Grêmio also played a home match at Estádio João Corrêa da Silveira (São Leopoldo).
^{c} Internacional also played a home match at Estádio João Corrêa da Silveira (São Leopoldo).
^{d} Palmeiras also played a home match at Arena Barueri (Barueri).
^{e} Real Brasília also played a home match at Arena BRB Mané Garrincha (Brasília).
^{f} Santos also played a home match at Arena Barueri (Barueri).
^{g} São Paulo also played a home match at Arena Barueri (Barueri).

== Group stage ==
In the group stage, each team played on a single round-robin tournament. The top eight teams advanced to the quarter-finals of the knockout stages. The teams were ranked according to points (3 points for a win, 1 point for a draw, and 0 points for a loss). If tied on points, the following criteria would be used to determine the ranking: 1. Wins; 2. Goal difference; 3. Goals scored; 4. Fewest red cards; 5. Fewest yellow cards; 6. Draw in the headquarters of the Brazilian Football Confederation (Regulations Article 14).

=== Group A ===
Pos	Team	Pld	W	D	L	GF	GA	GD	Pts	Qualification or relegation
1	Palmeiras	15	12	1	2	45	13	+32	37	Advance to Quarter-finals
2	São Paulo	15	11	2	2	30	13	+17	35	Advance to Quarter-finals
3	Internacional	15	10	3	2	27	13	+14	33	Advance to Quarter-finals
4	Corinthians	15	9	5	1	33	12	+21	32	Advance to Quarter-finals
5	Real Brasília	15	8	2	5	24	23	+1	26	Advance to Quarter-finals
6	Flamengo/Marinha	15	7	4	4	25	17	+8	25	Advance to Quarter-finals
7	Ferroviária	15	7	3	5	23	14	+9	24	Advance to Quarter-finals
8	Grêmio	15	5	6	4	22	18	+4	21	Advance to Quarter-finals
9	Santos	15	6	2	7	33	24	+9	20	
10	Avaí/Kindermann	15	6	2	7	16	26	−10	20	
11	Atlético Mineiro	15	5	4	6	17	17	0	19	
12	Cruzeiro	15	3	4	8	14	18	−4	13	
13	São José (R)	15	2	3	10	11	35	−24	9	Relegation to Campeonato Brasileiro Série A2
14	ESMAC (R)	15	2	2	11	13	42	−29	8	Relegation to Campeonato Brasileiro Série A2
15	Red Bull Bragantino (R)	15	1	4	10	11	23	−12	7	Relegation to Campeonato Brasileiro Série A2
16	CRESSPOM (R)	15	1	3	11	12	48	−36	6	Relegation to Campeonato Brasileiro Série A2

Source: CBF
(R) Relegated

=== Results ===
Home \ Away	CAM	AVA	COR	CRE	CRU	ESM	FER	FLA	GRE	INT	PAL	REA	RED	SAN	SJO	SAO
Atlético Mineiro		0–0	1–1					0–1		0–1		2–3	2–0	2–1		
Avaí/Kindermann				4–1	0–0	5–2	1–0	1–0		2–1			1–0	0–5		
Corinthians		4–0			1–0	4–0	2–2			1–1		3–0	2–1			1–1
CRESSPOM	0–3		0–3			2–2	0–5	1–3			1–7					1–3
Cruzeiro	1–2			0–0					0–0		2–4			4–2	0–1	0–1
ESMAC	0–1				2–1					0–4	1–4	0–3			1–0	1–4
Ferroviária	2–1				0–1	2–0		1–1		2–0	1–3	0–0		1–0		
Flamengo/Marinha			1–2		2–4	5–0			2–0			4–1	2–1			1–1
Grêmio	1–1	2–1	2–2	5–1		1–0	3–0			1–2	1–1					
Internacional				2–1	1–1			1–1				2–1	3–0	3–2	3–1	2–0
Palmeiras	2–1	6–1	2–0					3–0		0–1		4–1		1–0	5–0	
Real Brasília		2–0		3–1	1–0				1–1				3–2	3–1	1–0	
Red Bull Bragantino				0–1	1–0	1–1	0–1		1–1		1–2				1–1	
Santos			1–2	6–0		5–3		1–1	2–1				1–1		4–1	2–1
São José	0–0	2–0	0–5	2–2			1–6	0–1	1–3							
São Paulo	4–1	1–0					1–0		3–0		2–1	3–1	2–1		3–1	

Source: CBF
Legend: Blue = home team win; Yellow = draw; Red = away team win.

== Final stages ==
Starting from the quarter-finals, the teams played a single-elimination tournament with the following rules:

- Quarter-finals, semi-finals and finals were played on a home-and-away two-legged basis, with the higher-seeded team hosting the second leg.
  - If tied on aggregate, the penalty shoot-out would be used to determine the winners (Regulations Article 15).
- Extra time would not be played and away goals rule would not be used in final stages.

Starting from the semi-finals, the teams were seeded according to their performance in the tournament. The teams were ranked according to overall points. If tied on overall points, the following criteria would be used to determine the ranking: 1. Overall wins; 2. Overall goal difference; 3. Draw in the headquarters of the Brazilian Football Confederation (Regulations Article 19).

=== Bracket ===
Quarter-finals
(Rio de Janeiro (state)) Flamengo/Marinha	1	1	2
(Rio Grande do Sul) Internacional	3	1	4
(São Paulo (state)) Ferroviária	0	0	0
(São Paulo (state)) São Paulo	0	2	2
(Federal District (Brazil)) Real Brasília	0	0	0
(São Paulo (state)) Corinthians	2	1	3
(Rio Grande do Sul) Grêmio	0	1	1
(São Paulo (state)) Palmeiras	5	2	7

Semi-finals
(Rio Grande do Sul) Internacional	1	1	2
(São Paulo (state)) São Paulo	1	0	1
(São Paulo (state)) Corinthians	2	4	6
(São Paulo (state)) Palmeiras	1	0	1

Finals
(Rio Grande do Sul) Internacional	1	1	2
(São Paulo (state)) Corinthians	1	4	5

=== Quarter-finals ===
Team 1	Agg.	Team 2	1st leg	2nd leg
Grêmio (Rio Grande do Sul)	1–7	(São Paulo (state)) Palmeiras	0–5	1–2
Ferroviária (São Paulo (state))	0–2	(São Paulo (state)) São Paulo	0–0	0–2
Flamengo/Marinha (Rio de Janeiro (state))	2–4	(Rio Grande do Sul) Internacional	1–3	1–1
Real Brasília (Federal District (Brazil))	0–3	(São Paulo (state)) Corinthians	0–2	0–1

==== Group B ====
14 August 2022
11:00

Grêmio (Rio Grande do Sul)	0–5	(São Paulo (state)) Palmeiras
	Report	Ary Borges 2', 9', 33'; Duda Santos 70'; Carol Baiana 87'

Arena do Grêmio, Porto Alegre
Attendance: 775
Referee: Charly Wendy Straub Deretti (Santa Catarina)

20 August 2022
21:30

Palmeiras (São Paulo (state))	2–1	(Rio Grande do Sul) Grêmio
Carol Baiana 16'; Ary Borges 78'	Report	Caty 36'

Allianz Parque, São Paulo
Attendance: 1,216
Referee: Francielly Fernanda Lima de Castro (Minas Gerais)

Palmeiras won 7–1 on aggregate and advanced to the semi-finals.

==== Group C ====
14 August 2022
11:00

Ferroviária (São Paulo (state))	0–0	(São Paulo (state)) São Paulo
	Report

Estádio Fonte Luminosa, Araraquara
Attendance: 500
Referee: Fernanda dos Santos Ignacio de Souza (São Paulo)

21 August 2022
20:00

São Paulo (São Paulo (state))	2–0	(São Paulo (state)) Ferroviária
Rafa Travalão 48'; Micaelly 73'	Report

Arena Barueri, Barueri
Attendance: 128
Referee: Marianna Nanni Batalha (São Paulo)

São Paulo won 2–0 on aggregate and advanced to the semi-finals.

==== Group D ====
15 August 2022
20:00

Flamengo/Marinha (Rio de Janeiro (state))	1–3	(Rio Grande do Sul) Internacional
Daiane 61'	Report	Lelê 25', 59'; Maiara Lisboa 54'

Estádio Luso Brasileiro, Rio de Janeiro
Attendance: 0
Referee: Andreza Helena de Siqueira (Minas Gerais)

22 August 2022
15:00

Internacional (Rio Grande do Sul)	1–1	(Rio de Janeiro (state)) Flamengo/Marinha
Sorriso 60'	Report	Jaimes 17'

Estádio Beira-Rio, Porto Alegre
Attendance: 1,891
Referee: Charly Wendy Straub Deretti (Santa Catarina)

Internacional won 4–2 on aggregate and advanced to the semi-finals.

==== Group E ====
14 August 2022
11:00

Real Brasília (Federal District (Brazil))	0–2	(São Paulo (state)) Corinthians
	Report	Adriana 21'; Victória 54' (pen.)

Arena BRB Mané Garrincha, Brasília
Attendance: 1,101
Referee: Michelle Peixoto Safatle (Goiás)

21 August 2022
10:30

Corinthians (São Paulo (state))	1–0	(Federal District (Brazil)) Real Brasília
Tamires 59'	Report

Neo Química Arena, São Paulo
Attendance: 15,507
Referee: Andreza Helena de Siqueira (Minas Gerais)

Corinthians won 3–0 on aggregate and advanced to the semi-finals.

=== Semi-finals ===
Pos	Team	Pld	W	D	L	GF	GA	GD	Pts	Host
1	(São Paulo (state)) Palmeiras	17	14	1	2	52	14	+38	43	Second leg
3	(São Paulo (state)) Corinthians	17	11	5	1	36	12	+24	38	First leg
2	(São Paulo (state)) São Paulo	17	12	3	2	32	13	+19	39	Second leg
4	(Rio Grande do Sul) Internacional	17	11	4	2	31	15	+16	37	First leg

Source: CBF

Team 1	Agg.	Team 2	1st leg	2nd leg
Corinthians (São Paulo (state))	6–1	(São Paulo (state)) Palmeiras	2–1	4–0
Internacional (Rio Grande do Sul)	2–1	(São Paulo (state)) São Paulo	1–1	1–0

==== Group F ====
27 August 2022
14:00

Corinthians (São Paulo (state))	2–1	(São Paulo (state)) Palmeiras
Adriana 2'; Jaqueline 47'	Report	Camilinha 41'

Neo Química Arena, São Paulo
Attendance: 18,622
Referee: Deborah Cecilia Cruz Correia (Pernambuco)

10 September 2022
14:00

Palmeiras (São Paulo (state))	0–4	(São Paulo (state)) Corinthians
	Report	Adriana 9' (pen.); Gabi Portilho 44'; Jheniffer 50', 61'

Allianz Parque, São Paulo
Attendance: 11,450
Referee: Edina Alves Batista (São Paulo)

Corinthians won 6–1 on aggregate and advanced to the finals.

==== Group G ====
28 August 2022
11:00

Internacional (Rio Grande do Sul)	1–1	(São Paulo (state)) São Paulo
Lelê 54'	Report	Rafa Travalão 18'

Estádio Beira-Rio, Porto Alegre
Attendance: 7,101
Referee: Thayslane de Melo Costa (Sergipe)

12 September 2022
17:30

São Paulo (São Paulo (state))	0–1	(Rio Grande do Sul) Internacional
	Report	Maiara Lisboa 26'

Estádio do Morumbi, São Paulo
Attendance: 3,038
Referee: Charly Wendy Straub Deretti (Santa Catarina)

Internacional won 2–1 on aggregate and advanced to the finals.

=== Finals ===
Pos	Team	Pld	W	D	L	GF	GA	GD	Pts	Host
1	(São Paulo (state)) Corinthians	19	13	5	1	42	13	+29	44	2nd leg
2	(Rio Grande do Sul) Internacional	19	12	5	2	33	16	+17	41	1st leg

Source: CBF

Team 1	Agg.	Team 2	1st leg	2nd leg
Internacional (Rio Grande do Sul)	2–5	(São Paulo (state)) Corinthians	1–1	1–4

==== Group H ====
18 September 2022
11:00

Internacional (Rio Grande do Sul)	1–1	(São Paulo (state)) Corinthians
Millene 31'	Report	Jheniffer 57'

Estádio Beira-Rio, Porto Alegre
Attendance: 36,330
Referee: Deborah Cecilia Cruz Correia (Pernambuco)

24 September 2022
14:00

Corinthians (São Paulo (state))	4–1	(Rio Grande do Sul) Internacional
Jaqueline 22'; Diany 45'; Victória 47'; Jheniffer 90+1'	Report	Sorriso 13'

Neo Química Arena, São Paulo
Attendance: 41,070
Referee: Charly Wendy Straub Deretti (Santa Catarina)

== Top goalscorers ==
Rank	Player	Club	Goals
1	(Brazil) Cristiane	Santos	13
2	(Brazil) Adriana	Corinthians	9
2	(Brazil) Bia Zaneratto	Palmeiras	9
2	(Brazil) Rafa Travalão	São Paulo	9
5	(Brazil) Millene	Internacional	8
5	(Paraguay) Fabiola Sandoval	Avaí/Kindermann	8
7	(Brazil) Byanca Brasil	Palmeiras	7
7	(Brazil) Carol Baiana	Palmeiras	7
7	(Brazil) Jheniffer	Corinthians	7
7	(Brazil) Patrícia Sochor	Palmeiras	7

Source:CBF

== Awards ==
=== Individual awards ===
The following players were rewarded for their performances during the competition.

- Best player: Duda Sampaio (Internacional)
- Breakthrough player: Aline Gomes (Ferroviária)

=== Best XI ===
The best XI team was a squad consisting of the eleven most impressive players at the tournament.

Pos.	Player	Team
GK	(Brazil) Lorena	Grêmio
DF	(Brazil) Fe Palermo	São Paulo
DF	(Brazil) Sorriso	Internacional
DF	(Brazil) Tarciane	Corinthians
DF	(Brazil) Tamires	Corinthians
MF	(Brazil) Diany	Corinthians
MF	(Brazil) Ary Borges	Palmeiras
MF	(Brazil) Duda Sampaio	Internacional
MF	(Brazil) Gabi Zanotti	Corinthians
FW	(Brazil) Bia Zaneratto	Palmeiras
FW	(Brazil) Adriana	Corinthians
Head coach	(Brazil) Arthur Elias	Corinthians

Head coach
(Brazil) Arthur Elias
