= Associação Atlética Portuguesa =

Associação Atlética Portuguesa may refer to:

- Associação Atlética Portuguesa (MS), the former name of Futebol Clube Pantanal, a football club based in Campo Grande, Brazil
- Associação Atlética Portuguesa (RJ), a football club based in Rio de Janeiro, Brazil
- Associação Atlética Portuguesa (Santos), a football club based in Santos, Brazil
- Associação Portuguesa de Desportos, a football club based in São Paulo, Brazil
