= 2023 Campeonato Brasileiro de Futebol Feminino Série A2 =

2023 Brazilian soccer competition

Campeonato Brasileiro de Futebol Feminino Série A2
- Season: 2023
- Dates: 15 April – 10 July
- Champions: Red Bull Bragantino (2nd title)
- Promoted: América Mineiro; Botafogo; Fluminense; Red Bull Bragantino
- Relegated: Botafogo-PB; CRESSPOM; ESMAC; Vila Nova/UNIVERSO
- Matches played: 70
- Goals scored: 215 (3.07 per match)
- Top goalscorer: Paulina Gramaglia (10 goals)
- Biggest home win: América Mineiro 10–1 CRESSPOM; Group A, R6, 21 May
- Biggest away win: CRESSPOM 0–8 Fluminense; Group A, R5, 14 May
- Highest scoring: 11 goals América Mineiro 10–1 CRESSPOM; Group A, R6, 21 May

The 2023 Campeonato Brasileiro de Futebol Feminino Série A2 (officially the Brasileirão Feminino Binance A2 2023 for sponsorship reasons) was the 7th season of the Campeonato Brasileiro de Futebol Feminino Série A2, the second level of women's football in Brazil. The tournament was organized by CBF. It started on 15 April and ended on 10 July 2023.

Sixteen teams competed in the tournament. Eight returning from the 2022 Série A2, four relegated from the 2022 Série A1 (CRESSPOM, ESMAC, Red Bull Bragantino and São José), and four promoted from the 2022 Série A3 (3B da Amazônia, Sport, AD Taubaté and Vila Nova/UNIVERSO).

The four semi-finalists, América Mineiro, Botafogo, Fluminense and Red Bull Bragantino, were promoted to the 2024 Série A1, while Botafogo-PB, CRESSPOM, ESMAC and Vila Nova/UNIVERSO were relegated to the 2024 Série A3.

Red Bull Bragantino defeated Fluminense 4–0, on aggregate, in the finals to win their second title

== Format ==
In the group stage, the 16 teams were divided into two groups of eight organized regionally. Top four teams qualified for the quarter-finals. From the quarter-finals on the competition was played as a knock-out tournament with each round contested over two legs.

== Teams ==
Location of teams in 2023 Série A2

=== Number of teams by state ===
Number of teams	State	Team(s)
3	São Paulo	Red Bull Bragantino, São José and AD Taubaté
2	Amazonas	3B da Amazônia and JC
2	Distrito Federal	CRESSPOM and Minas/ICESP
2	Rio de Janeiro	Botafogo and Fluminense
1	Alagoas	UDA
1	Ceará	Fortaleza
1	Goiás	Vila Nova/UNIVERSO
1	Minas Gerais	América Mineiro
1	Pará	ESMAC
1	Paraíba	Botafogo-PB
1	Pernambuco	Sport

== Stadiums and locations ==
Team	Location	Stadium	Capacity
(Amazonas (Brazilian state)) 3B da Amazônia	Manaus	Ismael Benigno	10,451
(Minas Gerais) América Mineiro	Belo Horizonte	SESC Alterosas	2,000
(Rio de Janeiro (state)) Botafogo	Rio de Janeiro	Olímpico Nilton Santos	46,931
(Paraíba) Botafogo-PB	João Pessoa	Almeidão	19,000
(Federal District (Brazil)) CRESSPOM	Brasília	Maria de Lourdes Abadia (Ceilândia)	3,000
(Pará) ESMAC	Ananindeua	Francisco Vasques (Belém)	4,900
(Rio de Janeiro (state)) Fluminense	Rio de Janeiro	Estádio das Laranjeiras	2,000
(Ceará) Fortaleza	Fortaleza	CT Ribamar Bezerra (Maracanaú)	1,000
(Amazonas (Brazilian state)) JC	Itacoatiara	Floro de Mendonça	5,000
(Federal District (Brazil)) Minas/ICESP	Brasília	Ciro Machado do Espírito Santo	1,500
(São Paulo (state)) Red Bull Bragantino	Bragança Paulista	Prefeito Gabriel Marques da Silva (Santana de Parnaíba)	7,200
(São Paulo (state)) São José	São José dos Campos	Martins Pereira	16,500
(Pernambuco) Sport	Recife	Ilha do Retiro	32,983
(São Paulo (state)) AD Taubaté	Taubaté	Joaquinzão	12,896
(Alagoas) UDA	Maceió	Rei Pelé	17,126
(Goiás) Vila Nova/UNIVERSO	Goiânia	Onésio Brasileiro Alvarenga	6,500

== Group stage ==
In the group stage, each team played on a single round-robin tournament. The teams were ranked according to points (3 points for a win, 1 point for a draw, and 0 points for a loss). If tied on points, the following criteria would be used to determine the ranking: 1. Wins; 2. Goal difference; 3. Goals scored; 4. Fewest red cards; 5. Fewest yellow cards; 6. Draw in the headquarters of the Brazilian Football Confederation (Regulations Article 15).

The top four teams qualified for the quarter-finals, while the four teams with the lowest number of points, regardless of the group, were relegated to the 2024 Série A3.

=== Group A ===
Pos	Team	Pld	W	D	L	GF	GA	GD	Pts	Qualification	BOT	RED	FLU	AME	TAU	SAO	MIN	CRE
1	Botafogo	7	5	1	1	15	4	+11	16	Advance to quarter-finals		0–1	1–1	2–1			2–1	
2	Red Bull Bragantino	7	4	2	1	13	4	+9	14	Advance to quarter-finals				1–0	1–1		1–0	7–0
3	Fluminense	7	2	5	0	15	6	+9	11	Advance to quarter-finals		1–1		2–1			1–1	
4	América Mineiro	7	3	1	3	15	7	+8	10	Advance to quarter-finals					1–1		1–0	10–1
5	AD Taubaté	7	2	4	1	11	7	+4	10		0–2		1–1			1–1		
6	São José	7	2	2	3	10	6	+4	8		0–1	2–1	1–1	0–1				
7	Minas/ICESP	7	2	1	4	9	6	+3	7						0–1	1–0		6–0
8	CRESSPOM	7	0	0	7	2	50	−48	0	Relegation to Série A3	0–7		0–8		1–6	0–6		

Source: CBF
Rules for classification: 1) points; 2) wins; 3) goal difference; 4) goals scored; 5) fewest red cards; 6) fewest yellow cards; 7) draw.

=== Group B ===
Pos	Team	Pld	W	D	L	GF	GA	GD	Pts	Qualification	FOR	JCF	UDA	3BA	SPO	VIL	BOT	ESM
1	Fortaleza	7	5	2	0	11	6	+5	17	Advance to quarter-finals			1–0			1–0	2–1	3–3
2	JC	7	5	1	1	19	4	+15	16	Advance to quarter-finals	0–1			1–0	4–0	6–1		
3	UDA	7	4	1	2	14	6	+8	13	Advance to quarter-finals		2–2		1–0	0–1		7–1	
4	3B da Amazônia	7	3	2	2	10	6	+4	11	Advance to quarter-finals	1–1				4–2	2–1		
5	Sport	7	2	1	4	9	15	−6	7		1–2					2–2		2–1
6	Vila Nova/UNIVERSO	7	2	1	4	8	14	−6	7	Relegation to Série A3			0–1				2–1	2–1
7	Botafogo-PB	7	2	0	5	7	18	−11	6	Relegation to Série A3		0–2		0–3	2–1			
8	ESMAC	7	0	2	5	7	16	−9	2	Relegation to Série A3		0–4	1–3	0–0			1–2	

Source: CBF
Rules for classification: 1) points; 2) wins; 3) goal difference; 4) goals scored; 5) fewest red cards; 6) fewest yellow cards; 7) draw.

== Final stages ==
The final stages were played on a home-and-away two-legged basis. If tied on aggregate, the away goals rule would not be used, extra time would not be played, and the penalty shoot-out would be used to determine the winners (Regulations Article 16). For the semi-finals and finals, the best-overall-performance team hosted the second leg.

The four quarter-finals winners were promoted to 2024 Série A1.

=== Quarter-finals ===
The matches were played from 3 to 11 June 2023.

==== Matches ====
Team 1	Agg.	Team 2	1st leg	2nd leg
3B da Amazônia (Amazonas (Brazilian state))	1–7	(Rio de Janeiro (state)) Botafogo	0–0	1–7
Fluminense (Rio de Janeiro (state))	0–0 (4–3 p)	(Amazonas (Brazilian state)) JC	0–0	0–0
América Mineiro (Minas Gerais)	4–1	(Ceará) Fortaleza	2–1	2–0
UDA (Alagoas)	3–12	(São Paulo (state)) Red Bull Bragantino	1–7	2–5

=== Semi-finals ===
The matches were played from 18 to 26 June 2023.

==== Matches ====
Team 1	Agg.	Team 2	1st leg	2nd leg
Fluminense (Rio de Janeiro (state))	2–1	(Rio de Janeiro (state)) Botafogo	1–0	1–1
América Mineiro (Minas Gerais)	0–5	(São Paulo (state)) Red Bull Bragantino	0–2	0–3

=== Finals ===
The matches were played on 2 and 10 July 2023.

==== Matches ====
Team 1	Agg.	Team 2	1st leg	2nd leg
Fluminense (Rio de Janeiro (state))	0–4	(São Paulo (state)) Red Bull Bragantino	0–3	0–1

2 July 2023
15:00

Fluminense (Rio de Janeiro (state))	0–3	(São Paulo (state)) Red Bull Bragantino
	Report	Luana Índia 36'; Letícia Monteiro 42', 45+4'

Estádio Luso Brasileiro, Rio de Janeiro
Attendance: 0
Referee: Deborah Cecília Cruz Correia (Pernambuco)

10 July 2023
19:00

Red Bull Bragantino (São Paulo (state))	1–0	(Rio de Janeiro (state)) Fluminense
Gramaglia 11'	Report

Estádio Nabi Abi Chedid, Bragança Paulista
Attendance: 1,756
Referee: Thayslane de Melo Costa (Sergipe)

== Top goalscorers ==
Rank	Player	Team	Goals
1	(Argentina) Paulina Gramaglia	(São Paulo (state)) Red Bull Bragantino	10
2	(Brazil) Luana Índia	(São Paulo (state)) Red Bull Bragantino	7
3	(Brazil) Karol Cardozo	(Alagoas) UDA	6
3	(Brazil) Letícia Monteiro	(São Paulo (state)) Red Bull Bragantino	6
3	(Brazil) Valéria Lima	(Rio de Janeiro (state)) Botafogo	6

Source: CBF
