= 2021 Campeonato Brasileiro de Futebol Feminino Série A2 =

Campeonato Brasileiro de Futebol Feminino Série A2
- Season: 2021
- Dates: 15 May – 5 September 2021
- Champions: Red Bull Bragantino
- Promoted: Atlético Mineiro; CRESSPOM; ESMAC; Red Bull Bragantino
- Matches played: 116
- Goals scored: 393 (3.39 per match)
- Top goalscorer: 11 goals: Ariel Red Bull Bragantino

The 2021 Campeonato Brasileiro Feminino A-2 is the 5th season of the Campeonato Brasileiro de Futebol Feminino Série A2, the second level of women's football in Brazil. The tournament is organized by the Brazilian Football Confederation (CBF). It started on 15 May and scheduled to end on 5 September 2021.

It is played by 36 teams, which qualified through state championships or other tournaments held by each of the state federations, and also by the men's CBF ranking. This last criterion exists because of the requirement that, as of 2019, all Campeonato Brasileiro Série A teams in men's football a professional and youth soccer team, either in its own structure or by partnership.

== Format ==
In the first stage, the teams were divided into six groups of six teams each. Each group was played on a single round-robin basis. The top two teams of each group and the best third-placed teams advanced to the round od 16.

Starting from the round of 16, the teams will play a single-elimination tournament on a home-and-away two-legged basis. The teams qualified for the semifinals will be promoted to 2022 Campeonato Brasileiro Feminino Série A1

== Tiebreaker criteria ==
In case of a tie in points between two clubs, the tie-breaking criteria will be applied in the following order:

1. Number of wins
2. Goal balance
3. Goals scored
4. Number of red cards
5. Number of yellow cards
6. Prize draw

== Teams ==
Pot A	Pot B	Pot C	Pot D
(Amazonas (Brazilian state)) Iranduba (7); (São Paulo (state)) Ponte Preta (9); (Bahia) Vitória (10); (Pernambuco) Sport (15); (Minas Gerais) América Mineiro (19); (Piauí) Tiradentes (20); (Alagoas) União Desportiva (26); (Pernambuco) Náutico (27); (Pará) ESMAC (29)	(Espírito Santo) Vila Nova-ES (30); (Rio de Janeiro (state)) Vasco da Gama (35); Ceará (37); (Santa Catarina (state)) Chapecoense (38); (Paraíba) Botafogo-PB (39); (Rio de Janeiro (state)) Fluminense (40); (Amapá) Oratório (41); (Minas Gerais) Atlético Mineiro (42); (Federal District (Brazil)) CRESSPOM (47)	(Roraima) São Raimundo (49); (Goiás) Aliança-GO (51); (Ceará) Fortaleza (55); (Paraná (state)) Athletico Paranaense (56); (Rondônia) Real Ariquemes (57); (Sergipe) Santos Dumont (58); (Rio Grande do Sul) Brasil de Farroupilha (58); (Goiás) Atlético Goianiense (58); (Mato Grosso do Sul) SERC (58)	(Mato Grosso) Mixto (81); (Bahia) Juventude-BA (-); (Santa Catarina (state)) Criciúma (-); (São Paulo (state)) Red Bull Bragantino (-); (Amazonas (Brazilian state)) JC (-); (Maranhão) CEFAMA (-); (Acre (state)) Assermurb (-); (Rio Grande do Norte) América de Natal (-); (Tocantins) Paraíso (-)

== Group stage ==
=== Group A ===
Pos	Team	Pld	W	D	L	GF	GA	GD	Pts	Qualification
1	(Pará) ESMAC	5	4	1	0	24	1	+23	13	Advance to Round of 16
2	(Rondônia) Real Ariquemes	5	4	0	1	14	4	+10	12	Advance to Round of 16
3	(Amazonas (Brazilian state)) Iranduba	5	2	2	1	15	6	+9	8	Best 4 third-places
4	(Acre (state)) Assermurb	5	1	1	3	5	18	−13	4	Eliminated
5	(Roraima) São Raimundo	5	1	1	3	5	19	−14	4	Eliminated
6	(Amapá) Oratório	5	0	1	4	4	19	−15	1	Eliminated

Source: CBF

=== Group B ===
Pos	Team	Pld	W	D	L	GF	GA	GD	Pts	Qualification
1	(Ceará) Fortaleza	5	4	1	0	13	1	+12	13	Advance to Round of 16
2	(Amazonas (Brazilian state)) JC	5	3	1	1	13	7	+6	10	Advance to Round of 16
3	(Maranhão) CEFAMA	5	2	1	2	9	9	0	7	Eliminated
4	(Bahia) Vitória	5	1	1	3	11	16	−5	4	Eliminated
5	(Piauí) Tiradentes	5	1	1	3	5	12	−7	4	Eliminated
6	(Tocantins) Paraíso	5	0	3	2	6	12	−6	3	Eliminated

Source: CBF

=== Group C ===
Pos	Team	Pld	W	D	L	GF	GA	GD	Pts	Qualification
1	Ceará	5	5	0	0	22	2	+20	15	Advance to Round of 16
2	(Paraíba) Botafogo-PB	5	4	0	1	13	3	+10	12	Advance to Round of 16
3	(Alagoas) União Desportiva	5	2	1	2	10	6	+4	7	Best 4 third-places
4	(Rio Grande do Norte) América de Natal	5	2	1	2	8	9	−1	7	Eliminated
5	(Pernambuco) Náutico	5	1	0	4	6	13	−7	3	Eliminated
6	(Sergipe) Santos Dumont	5	0	0	5	1	27	−26	0	Eliminated

Source: CBF

=== Group D ===
Pos	Team	Pld	W	D	L	GF	GA	GD	Pts	Qualification
1	(São Paulo (state)) Red Bull Bragantino	5	5	0	0	25	0	+25	15	Advance to Round of 16
2	(Rio de Janeiro (state)) Fluminense	5	4	0	1	16	8	+8	12	Advance to Round of 16
3	(Santa Catarina (state)) Criciúma	5	2	1	2	6	10	−4	7	Eliminated
4	(Espírito Santo) Vila Nova-ES	5	1	2	2	7	15	−8	5	Eliminated
5	(Pernambuco) Sport	5	1	1	3	7	11	−4	4	Eliminated
6	(Goiás) Atlético Goianiense	5	0	0	5	1	18	−17	0	Eliminated

Source: CBF

=== Group E ===
Pos	Team	Pld	W	D	L	GF	GA	GD	Pts	Qualification
1	(Minas Gerais) Atlético Mineiro	5	5	0	0	14	1	+13	15	Advance to Round of 16
2	(Federal District (Brazil)) CRESSPOM	5	3	1	1	16	6	+10	10	Advance to Round of 16
3	(Goiás) Aliança-GO	5	3	0	2	8	11	−3	9	Best 4 third-places
4	(Bahia) Juventude-BA	5	1	1	3	9	11	−2	4	Eliminated
5	(Mato Grosso) Mixto	5	1	0	4	4	11	−7	3	Eliminated
6	(Mato Grosso do Sul) SERC	5	1	0	4	6	17	−11	3	Eliminated

Source: CBF

=== Group F ===
Pos	Team	Pld	W	D	L	GF	GA	GD	Pts	Qualification
1	(Rio de Janeiro (state)) Vasco da Gama	5	5	0	0	12	1	+11	15	Advance to Round of 16
2	(Paraná (state)) Athletico Paranaense	5	4	0	1	14	3	+11	12	Advance to Round of 16
3	(Minas Gerais) América Mineiro	5	2	1	2	7	6	+1	7	Best 4 third-places
4	(Santa Catarina (state)) Chapecoense	5	1	1	3	5	10	−5	4	Eliminated
5	(São Paulo (state)) Ponte Preta	5	0	3	2	3	9	−6	3	Eliminated
6	(Rio Grande do Sul) Brasil de Farroupilha	5	0	1	4	2	14	−12	1	Eliminated

Source: CBF

=== Ranking of third-placed teams ===
Pos	Team	Pld	W	D	L	GF	GA	GD	Pts	Qualification
1	(Goiás) Aliança-GO	5	3	0	2	8	11	−3	9	Advance to Round of 16
2	(Amazonas (Brazilian state)) Iranduba	5	2	2	1	15	6	+9	8	Advance to Round of 16
3	(Alagoas) União Desportiva	5	2	1	2	10	6	+4	7	Advance to Round of 16
4	(Minas Gerais) América Mineiro	5	2	1	2	7	6	+1	7	Advance to Round of 16
5	(Santa Catarina (state)) Criciúma	5	2	1	2	6	10	−4	7	Eliminated
6	(Maranhão) CEFAMA	5	2	1	2	9	9	0	7	Eliminated

Source: CBF

== Final stages ==
Pot A	Pot B
(Pará) ESMAC (29); (Rio de Janeiro (state)) Vasco da Gama (35); Ceará (37); (Minas Gerais) Atlético Mineiro (42); (Ceará) Fortaleza (55); (Paraná (state)) Athletico Paranaense (56); (Rondônia) Real Ariquemes (57); (São Paulo (state)) Red Bull Bragantino (-)	(Amazonas (Brazilian state)) Iranduba (7); (Minas Gerais) América Mineiro (19); (Alagoas) União Desportiva (26); (Paraíba) Botafogo-PB (39); (Rio de Janeiro (state)) Fluminense (40); (Goiás) Aliança-GO (51); (Federal District (Brazil)) CRESSPOM (-); (Amazonas (Brazilian state)) JC (-)

Pos	Team	Pld	W	D	L	GF	GA	GD	Pts	
1	(São Paulo (state)) Red Bull Bragantino	5	5	0	0	25	0	+25	15	Qualified Pot A Final Stages.
2	Ceará	5	5	0	0	21	2	+19	15	Qualified Pot A Final Stages.
3	(Minas Gerais) Atlético Mineiro	5	5	0	0	14	1	+13	15	Qualified Pot A Final Stages.
4	(Rio de Janeiro (state)) Vasco da Gama	5	5	0	0	12	1	+11	15	Qualified Pot A Final Stages.
5	(Pará) ESMAC	5	4	1	0	24	1	+23	13	Qualified Pot A Final Stages.
6	(Ceará) Fortaleza	5	4	1	0	13	1	+12	13	Qualified Pot A Final Stages.
7	(Paraná (state)) Athletico Paranaense	5	4	0	1	14	3	+11	12	Qualified Pot A Final Stages.
8	(Rondônia) Real Ariquemes	5	4	0	1	14	4	+10	12	Qualified Pot A Final Stages.
9	(Rio de Janeiro (state)) Fluminense	5	4	0	1	16	8	+8	12	Qualified Pot B Final Stages.
10	(Paraíba) Botafogo-PB	5	4	0	1	13	3	+10	12	Qualified Pot B Final Stages.
11	(Federal District (Brazil)) CRESSPOM	5	3	1	1	16	6	+10	10	Qualified Pot B Final Stages.
12	(Amazonas (Brazilian state)) JC	5	3	1	1	13	7	+6	10	Qualified Pot B Final Stages.
13	(Goiás) Aliança-GO	5	3	0	2	8	11	−3	9	Qualified Pot B Final Stages.
14	(Amazonas (Brazilian state)) Iranduba	5	2	2	1	15	6	+9	8	Qualified Pot B Final Stages.
15	(Alagoas) União Desportiva	5	2	1	2	10	6	+4	7	Qualified Pot B Final Stages.
16	(Minas Gerais) América Mineiro	5	2	1	2	7	6	+1	7	Qualified Pot B Final Stages.

Source: CBF

=== Bracket ===
Round of 16
9	(Rio de Janeiro (state)) Fluminense	2	0	2 (1)
8	(Rondônia) Real Ariquemes (p)	1	1	2 (3)
15	(Goiás) Aliança-GO	0	0	0
5	(Pará) ESMAC	1	0	1
14	(Alagoas) União Desportiva	0	0	0
7	(Paraná (state)) Athletico Paranaense	4	3	7
12	(Amazonas (Brazilian state)) JC	1	0	1
1	(São Paulo (state)) Red Bull Bragantino	0	4	4
11	(Federal District (Brazil)) CRESSPOM (p)	0	1	1 (3)
6	(Ceará) Fortaleza	0	1	1 (1)
10	(Paraíba) Botafogo-PB	1	1	2
2	Ceará	2	3	5
16	(Minas Gerais) América Mineiro	2	1	3
4	(Rio de Janeiro (state)) Vasco da Gama	0	2	2
13	(Amazonas (Brazilian state)) Iranduba	0	1	1
3	(Minas Gerais) Atlético Mineiro	2	1	3

Quarter-finals
(Rondônia) Real Ariquemes	1	1	2
(Pará) ESMAC	1	2	3
(Paraná (state)) Athletico Paranaense	4	0	4(2)
(São Paulo (state)) Red Bull Bragantino	2	2	4(4)
(Federal District (Brazil)) CRESSPOM	0	2	2
Ceará	0	0	0
(Minas Gerais) América Mineiro	1	0	1
(Minas Gerais) Atlético Mineiro	3	0	3

Semi-finals
(Pará) ESMAC	1	0	1
(São Paulo (state)) Red Bull Bragantino	1	2	3
(Federal District (Brazil)) CRESSPOM	0	0	0
(Minas Gerais) Atlético Mineiro	1	0	1

Final
(São Paulo (state)) Red Bull Bragantino	0	0	0 (4)
(Minas Gerais) Atlético Mineiro	0	0	0 (2)

=== Round of 16 ===
28 June 2021
16:00

JC (Amazonas (Brazilian state))	1–0	(São Paulo (state)) Red Bull Bragantino
Fabiola 58'	Report

Estádio Floro de Mendonça, Itacoatiara
4 July 2021
15:00

Red Bull Bragantino (São Paulo (state))	4–0	(Amazonas (Brazilian state)) JC
Raquel 20'; Ariel 35'; Rosani 38', 54' (pen.)	Report

CFA, Jarinu

Red Bull Bragantino won 4–1 on aggregate and advanced to quarter-finals.

27 June 2021
15:00

União Desportiva (Alagoas)	0–4	(Paraná (state)) Athletico Paranaense
	Report	Kimbelly 19'; Bruna 29'; Jó 31'; Isa Momesso 65'

Estádio Universitário da UFAL, Maceió
3 July 2021
15:00

Athletico Paranaense (Paraná (state))	3–0	(Alagoas) União Desportiva
Joyce 47'; Milena 78'; Tayná 89'	Report

CT do Caju, Curitiba

Athletico Paranaense won 7–0 on aggregate and advanced to quarter-finals.

27 June 2021
15:00

Fluminense (Rio de Janeiro (state))	2–1	(Rondônia) Real Ariquemes
Luany 15'; Dani 60'	Report	Loira 31'

Estádio das Laranjeiras, Rio de Janeiro
4 July 2021
16:30

Real Ariquemes (Rondônia)	1–0	(Rio de Janeiro (state)) Fluminense
Thayanra 48'	Report
Penalties
Leila (penalty missed); Thabata (penalty scored); Bia (penalty scored); Emy (penalty scored)	3--1	Larissa (penalty missed); Letícia (penalty scored); Rivena (penalty missed); Vilmara (penalty missed)

Estádio Gentil Valério, Ariquemes

Tied 2–2 on aggregate, Real Ariquemes won on penalties and advanced to quarter-finals.

27 June 2021
15:00

Aliança-GO (Goiás)	0–1	(Pará) ESMAC
	Report	Claudiane 38'

Estádio Abrão Manoel da Costa, Trindade
4 July 2021
10:00

ESMAC (Pará)	0–0	(Goiás) Aliança-GO
	Report

Estádio Francisco Vasques, Belém

ESMAC won 1–0 on aggregate and advanced to quarter-finals.

27 June 2021
10:00

América Mineiro (Minas Gerais)	2–0	(Rio de Janeiro (state)) Vasco da Gama
Caroliny 1'; Thaís 10' (o.g.)	Report

Estádio das Alterosas, Belo Horizonte
4 July 2021
15:00

Vasco da Gama (Rio de Janeiro (state))	2–1	(Minas Gerais) América Mineiro
Rhaizza 42'; Tatiana 47'	Report	Dilene 81'

Estádio Nivaldo Pereira, Nova Iguaçu

América Mineiro won 3–2 on aggregate and advanced to quarter-finals.

27 June 2021
16:00

Iranduba (Amazonas (Brazilian state))	0–2	(Minas Gerais) Atlético Mineiro
	Report	Bruna 4', 38'

Estádio Carlos Zamith, Manaus
3 July 2021
20:00

Atlético Mineiro (Minas Gerais)	1–1	(Amazonas (Brazilian state)) Iranduba
Dala Rosa 70'	Report	Nadine 87'

Estádio das Alterosas, Belo Horizonte

Atlético Mineiro won 3–1 on aggregate and advanced to quarter-finals.

27 June 2021
16:00

Botafogo-PB (Paraíba)	1–2	Ceará
Rayane 56' (o.g.)	Report	Karen 3'; Michele 42'

Almeidão, João Pessoa
3 July 2021
15:00

Ceará	3–1	(Paraíba) Botafogo-PB
Thayane 49'; Nathalia 61'; Thays 86'	Report	Mari 8' (o.g.)

Cidade Vozão, Itaitinga

Ceará won 5–2 on aggregate and advanced to quarter-finals.

27 June 2021
15:00

CRESSPOM (Federal District (Brazil))	0–0	(Ceará) Fortaleza
	Report

Estádio Maria de Lourdes Abadia, Ceilândia
4 July 2021
15:00

Fortaleza (Ceará)	1–1	(Federal District (Brazil)) CRESSPOM
Kaila 54'	Report	Laissa 41'
Penalties
Kaila (penalty missed); Magna (penalty missed); Táfila (penalty scored); Natyele (penalty missed)	1--3	Miriam (penalty missed); Katyele (penalty scored); Eliude (penalty missed); Isabela (penalty scored); Barbara (penalty scored)

Domingão, Horizonte

Tied 1–1 on aggregate, CRESSPOM won on penalties and advanced to quarter-finals.

=== Quarter-finals ===
10 July 2021
15:00

Athletico Paranaense (Paraná (state))	4–2	(São Paulo (state)) Red Bull Bragantino
Kimbelly 16'; Milena 56'; Joyce 70', 79'	Report	Rosani 45+4' (pen.); Mylena 63'

CT do Caju, Curitiba
18 July 2021
15:00

Red Bull Bragantino (São Paulo (state))	2–0	(Paraná (state)) Athletico Paranaense
Raquel 6'; Ingryd 36'	Report
Penalties
Mylena (penalty missed); Rayanna (penalty scored); Raquel (penalty scored); Brenda (penalty scored); Ariel (penalty scored)	4--2	Thayná (penalty scored); Milena (penalty missed); Bruna (penalty missed); Kimbelly (penalty scored)

CFA, Jarinu

Tied 4–4 on aggregate, Red Bull Bragantino won on penalties and advance to the semi-finals.

11 July 2021
16:30

Real Ariquemes (Rondônia)	1–1	(Pará) ESMAC
Thaynara 77'	Report	Cássia 23'

Estádio Gentil Valério, Ariquemes
18 July 2021
10:00

ESMAC (Pará)	2–1	(Rondônia) Real Ariquemes
Anne 39'; Cássia 45+2'	Report	Ana Beatriz 9'

Estádio Francisco Vasques, Belém

ESMAC won 3–2 on aggregate and advance to the semi-finals.

11 July 2021
15:00

América Mineiro (Minas Gerais)	1–3	(Minas Gerais) Atlético Mineiro
Caroliny 28'	Report	Bruna 9'; Flávia 22'; Bruna Marques 58'

Estádio das Alterosas, Belo Horizonte
17 July 2021
15:00

Atlético Mineiro (Minas Gerais)	0–0	(Minas Gerais) América Mineiro
	Report

Estádio das Alterosas, Belo Horizonte

Atlético Mineiro won 3–1 on aggregate and advance to the semi-finals.

11 July 2021
15:00

CRESSPOM (Federal District (Brazil))	0–0	Ceará
	Report

Estádio Maria de Lourdes Abadia, Ceilândia
18 July 2021
15:00

Ceará	0–2	(Federal District (Brazil)) CRESSPOM
	Report	Isabela 3', 28'

Cidade Vozão, Itaitinga

CRESSPOM won 2–0 on aggregate and advance to the semi-finals.

=== Semi-finals ===
15 August 2021
10:00

ESMAC (Pará)	1–1	(São Paulo (state)) Red Bull Bragantino
Anne 11'	Report	Guyd 1'

Estádio Francisco Vasques, Belém
22 August 2021
15:00

Red Bull Bragantino (São Paulo (state))	2–0	(Pará) ESMAC
	Report

CFA, Jarinu

Bragantino won 3–1 on aggregate and advance to the Finals.

15 August 2021
15:00

CRESSPOM (Federal District (Brazil))	0–1	(Minas Gerais) Atlético Mineiro
	Report	Lara 20'

Estádio Maria de Lourdes Abadia, Ceilândia
21 August 2021
10:30

Atlético Mineiro (Minas Gerais)	0–0	(Federal District (Brazil)) CRESSPOM
	Report

Estádio das Alterosas, Belo Horizonte

Atlético Mineiro won 2–0 on aggregate and advance to the Finals.

=== Finals ===
31 August 2021
10:00

Red Bull Bragantino (São Paulo (state))	0–0	(Minas Gerais) Atlético Mineiro
	Report

Abi Chedid, Bragança Paulista

7 September 2021
11:00

Atlético Mineiro (Minas Gerais)	0–0	(São Paulo (state)) Red Bull Bragantino
	Report
Penalties
Ilana (penalty missed); Cinthia (penalty scored); Cotrim (penalty scored); Flávia Gil (penalty missed)	2-4	Rayanna (penalty scored); Lay (penalty scored); Brenda (penalty missed); Raquel (penalty scored); Ariel (penalty scored)

Estádio Independência, Belo Horizonte

Tied 0–0 on aggregate, Bragantino won on penalties and was the champion.

== Final classification ==
Pos	Team	Pld	W	D	L	GF	GA	GD	Pts	Qualification or relegation
1	(São Paulo (state)) Red Bull Bragantino	13	8	3	2	36	6	+30	27	Champions and promoted to the 2022 Série A1.
2	(Minas Gerais) Atlético Mineiro	13	8	5	0	21	3	+18	29	Runners-up and promoted to the 2022 Série A1.
3	(Pará) ESMAC	11	6	4	1	29	6	+23	22	Eliminated in the Semi-finals and promoted to the 2022 Série A1.
4	(Federal District (Brazil)) CRESSPOM	11	4	5	2	19	8	+11	17	Eliminated in the Semi-finals and promoted to the 2022 Série A1.
5	Ceará	9	7	1	1	26	6	+20	22	Eliminated in the Quarter-finals and Qualified for the 2022 Série A2.
6	(Paraná (state)) Athletico Paranaense	9	7	0	2	26	7	+19	21	Eliminated in the Quarter-finals and Qualified for the 2022 Série A2.
7	(Rondônia) Real Ariquemes	9	5	1	3	18	9	+9	16	Eliminated in the Quarter-finals and Qualified for the 2022 Série A2.
8	(Minas Gerais) América Mineiro	9	3	2	4	11	11	0	11	Eliminated in the Quarter-finals and Qualified for the 2022 Série A2.
9	(Rio de Janeiro (state)) Vasco da Gama	7	6	0	1	14	4	+10	18	Eliminated in the Round of 16 and Qualified for the 2022 Série A2.
10	(Rio de Janeiro (state)) Fluminense	7	5	0	2	18	10	+8	15	Eliminated in the Round of 16 and Qualified for the 2022 Série A2.
11	(Ceará) Fortaleza	7	4	3	0	14	2	+12	15	Eliminated in the Round of 16 and Qualified for the 2022 Série A2.
12	(Amazonas (Brazilian state)) JC	7	4	1	2	14	11	+3	13	Eliminated in the Round of 16 and Qualified for the 2022 Série A2.
13	(Paraíba) Botafogo-PB	7	4	0	3	15	8	+7	12	Eliminated in the Round of 16 and Qualified for the 2022 Série A2.
14	(Goiás) Aliança-GO	7	3	1	3	8	12	−4	10	Eliminated in the Round of 16 and Qualified for the 2022 Série A2.
15	(Amazonas (Brazilian state)) Iranduba	7	2	3	2	16	9	+7	9	Eliminated in the Round of 16 and Qualified for the 2022 Série A2.
16	(Alagoas) União Desportiva	7	2	1	4	10	13	−3	7	Eliminated in the Round of 16 and Qualified for the 2022 Série A2.
17	(Maranhão) CEFAMA	5	2	1	2	9	9	0	7	Eliminated and disputed vacancy in the 2022 Série A3.
18	(Rio Grande do Norte) América de Natal	5	2	1	2	8	9	−1	7	Eliminated and disputed vacancy in the 2022 Série A3.
19	(Santa Catarina (state)) Criciúma	5	2	1	2	6	10	−4	7	Eliminated and disputed vacancy in the 2022 Série A3.
20	(Espírito Santo) Vila Nova-ES	5	1	2	2	7	15	−8	5	Eliminated and disputed vacancy in the 2022 Série A3.
21	(Bahia) Juventude-BA	5	1	1	3	9	11	−2	4	Eliminated and disputed vacancy in the 2022 Série A3.
22	(Pernambuco) Sport	5	1	1	3	7	11	−4	4	Eliminated and disputed vacancy in the 2022 Série A3.
23	(Bahia) Vitória	5	1	1	3	11	16	−5	4	Eliminated and disputed vacancy in the 2022 Série A3.
24	(Santa Catarina (state)) Chapecoense	5	1	1	3	5	10	−5	4	Eliminated and disputed vacancy in the 2022 Série A3.
25	(Piauí) Tiradentes	5	1	1	3	5	12	−7	4	Eliminated and disputed vacancy in the 2022 Série A3.
26	(Acre (state)) Assermurb	5	1	1	3	5	18	−13	4	Eliminated and disputed vacancy in the 2022 Série A3.
27	(Roraima) São Raimundo	5	1	1	3	5	19	−14	4	Eliminated and disputed vacancy in the 2022 Série A3.
28	(Tocantins) Paraíso	5	0	3	2	6	12	−6	3	Eliminated and disputed vacancy in the 2022 Série A3.
29	(São Paulo (state)) Ponte Preta	5	0	3	2	3	9	−6	3	Eliminated and disputed vacancy in the 2022 Série A3.
30	(Pernambuco) Náutico	5	1	0	4	6	13	−7	3	Eliminated and disputed vacancy in the 2022 Série A3.
31	(Mato Grosso) Mixto	5	1	0	4	4	11	−7	3	Eliminated and disputed vacancy in the 2022 Série A3.
32	(Mato Grosso do Sul) SERC	5	1	0	4	6	17	−11	3	Eliminated and disputed vacancy in the 2022 Série A3.
33	(Rio Grande do Sul) Brasil de Farroupilha	5	0	1	4	2	14	−12	1	Eliminated and disputed vacancy in the 2022 Série A3.
34	(Amapá) Oratório	5	0	1	4	4	19	−15	1	Eliminated and disputed vacancy in the 2022 Série A3.
35	(Goiás) Atlético Goianiense	5	0	0	5	1	18	−17	0	Eliminated and disputed vacancy in the 2022 Série A3.
36	(Sergipe) Santos Dumont	5	0	0	5	1	27	−26	0	Eliminated and disputed vacancy in the 2022 Série A3.

Source: CBF
