= Red Bull Bragantino (women) =

Women's football club based in Campinas, São Paulo, Brazil

- Full name: Red Bull Bragantino
- Nickname: Bragantinas
- Founded: March 2020; 6 years ago
- Ground: Cícero de Souza Marques
- Capacity: 12,000
- CEO: Diego Cerri
- Head coach: Humberto Simão
- League: Campeonato Brasileiro Série A1; Campeonato Paulista
- 2025 2025: Série A1, 8th of 16; Paulista, 5th of 8
Home colours	Away colours	Third colours

Red Bull Bragantino, commonly known as Bragantino or the Bragantinas, is a Brazilian women's Association football club, based in the city of Bragança Paulista, São Paulo. It is the women's section of Red Bull Bragantino. They won the Campeonato Brasileiro de Futebol Feminino Série A2 twice.

== History ==
In March 2020, the women's team of Red Bull Bragantino were launched, and announced Camilla Orlando as their head coach. They immediately started playing in the 2020 Campeonato Paulista de Futebol Feminino, reaching the semifinals of the competition but being knocked out by Ferroviária.

Bragantino started playing in the Campeonato Brasileiro de Futebol Feminino Série A2 in the 2021 season, and achieved promotion to the Série A1 as champions. After being immediately relegated back to the second division, they again achieved promotion as champions in 2023.

== Players ==
=== Current squad ===
As of 13 April 2026.

Note: Flags indicate national team as defined under FIFA eligibility rules; some limited exceptions apply. Players may hold more than one non-FIFA nationality.

No.	Pos.	Nation	Player
1	GK	BRA	Manu Souza
2	DF	BRA	Tamires Lima
5	MF	BRA	Laura Valverde
6	DF	BRA	Gabi Medeiros
7	DF	BRA	Carol Tavares
8	FW	BRA	Jane Tavares
9	FW	ARG	Martina Del Trecco
11	FW	BRA	Gaby Santos
12	GK	BRA	Thalya Nobre
13	MF	BRA	Mylena Pedroso
14	MF	BRA	Ana Carla
15	DF	BRA	Jéssica Soares
16	DF	BRA	Ilana Mendonça
17	MF	BRA	Rafa Mineira

No.	Pos.	Nation	Player
19	DF	BRA	Géssica Nascimento
20	DF	BRA	Camila Ambrozio
21	MF	BRA	Miriã dos Santos
22	GK	BRA	Letícia Rodrigues
23	FW	BRA	Ester Marcelino
25	MF	URU	Karol Bermúdez
26	MF	BRA	Gio Korneiczuk
27	DF	BRA	Stella Terra
28	DF	BRA	Catarina Ferreira
29	FW	BRA	Janyele Almeida
30	FW	BRA	Duda Rodrigues
31	FW	BRA	Lurdinha
32	MF	BRA	Marzia Coutinho

=== Youth team ===
Note: Flags indicate national team as defined under FIFA eligibility rules; some limited exceptions apply. Players may hold more than one non-FIFA nationality.

No.	Pos.	Nation	Player
42	GK	BRA	Amanda

== Honours ==
=== Official tournaments ===
National
Competitions	Titles	Seasons
Campeonato Brasileiro Série A2	2	2021, 2023
State
Competitions	Titles	Seasons
Copa Paulista	1	2025

- record

== See also ==
- Red Bull Bragantino
