= Géssica =

Brazilian footballer (born 1991)

Géssica do Nascimento
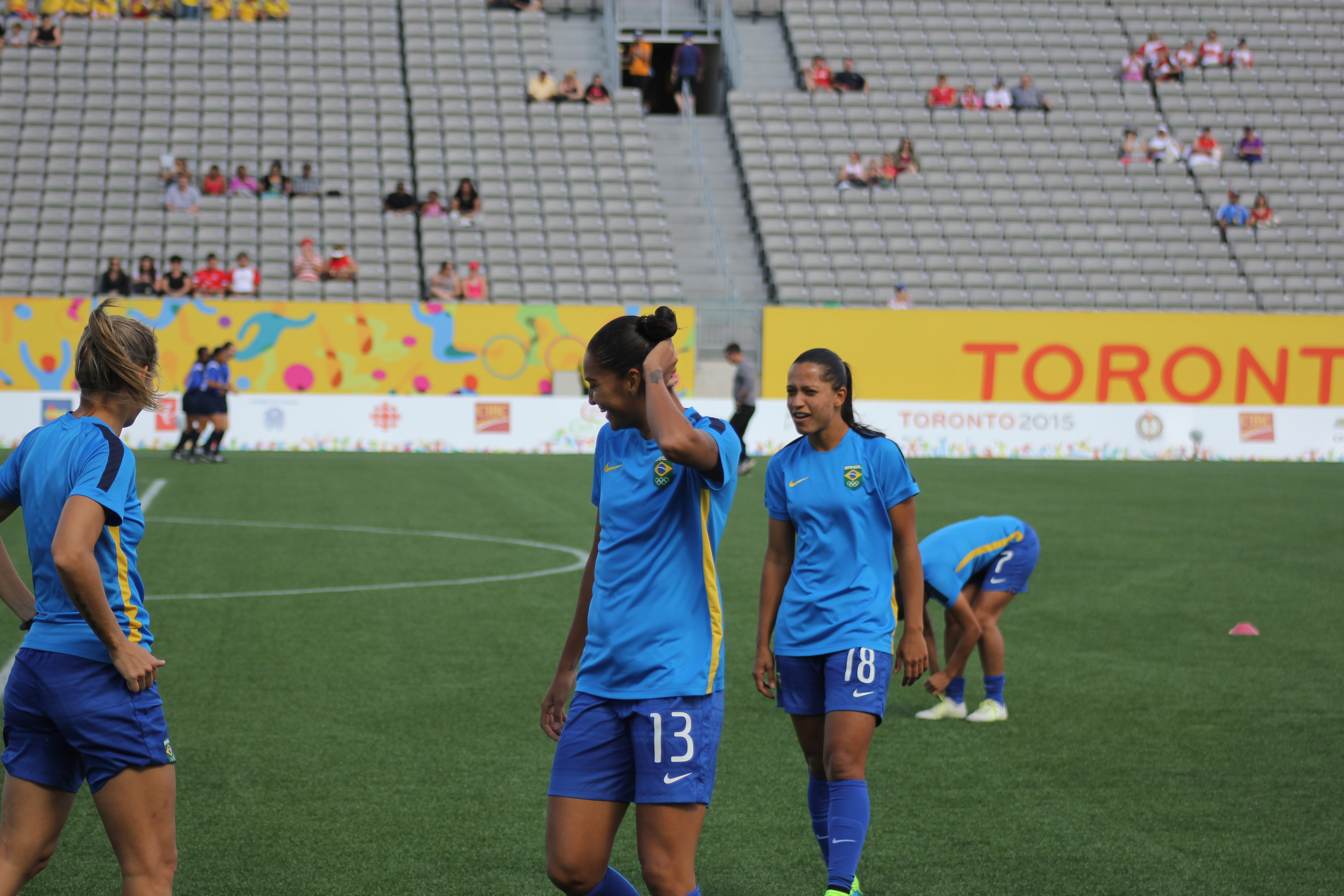
- Géssica #18 , far right (2015)

Personal information
- Full name: Géssica do Nascimento
- Date of birth: 19 March 1991 (age 35)
- Place of birth: Brotas, Brazil
- Height: 1.65 m (5 ft 5 in)
- Position: Defender

Team information
- Current team: Red Bull Bragantino
- Number: 19

Senior career*
| Years | Team | Apps | (Gls) |
| 2009–2014 | Ferroviária | 14+ | (0+) |
| 2015 | Botafogo PB | 6 | (0) |
| 2016 | Ferroviária | 8 | (1) |
| 2016–2018 | Braga | | |
| 2018–2023 | Ferroviária | 73 | (3) |
| 2024– | Red Bull Bragantino | 2 | (0) |

International career^{‡}
| 2015– | Brazil | 3 | (0) |
Medal record
Women's football
Representing Brazil
Pan American Games
| Gold medal – first place | 2015 Toronto | Team |
- * Club domestic league appearances and goals as of 22:22, 11 April 2024 ‡ National team caps and goals as of 22:22, 11 April 2024 (UTC)

Géssica do Nascimento (born 19 March 1991), commonly known as Géssica, is a Brazilian footballer who plays as a defender for Red Bull Bragantino. She participated at the 2015 FIFA Women's World Cup.

== Club career ==
=== First spell at Ferroviária ===
Géssica joined her first football club Ferroviária in 2009, after she traveled to Araraquara to try out. She eventually became an important central defender and captain of the team.

=== Botafogo-PB ===
Géssica made her league debut against São José EC on 30 September 2015.

=== Second spell at Ferroviária ===
During her second spell, Géssica made her league debut against Rio Preto Esporte Clube on 22 March 2016. She scored her first league goal against Foz Cataratas on 13 April 2016, scoring in the 61st minute.

=== Third spell at Ferroviária ===
During her third spell, Géssica made her league debut against Pinheirense on 25 April 2018. She scored her first league goal against São Francisco BA on 11 July 2018, scoring in the 24th minute.

=== RB Bragantino ===
Géssica made her league debut against Avaí on 16 March 2024.

== International career ==
In May 2015, Brazil coach Vadão called 24-year-old Géssica up to the national team for the first time, as a replacement for the injured Bruna Benites. At the 2015 FIFA Women's World Cup in Canada, Géssica made substitute appearances in Brazil's group stage wins over South Korea and Costa Rica. After Brazil's second round elimination by Australia, Géssica remained in Canada as part of the Brazilian selection for the 2015 Pan American Games in Toronto.
