= Campeonato Sul-Mato-Grossense de Futebol Feminino =

Women's football league in Mato Grosso do Sul, Brazil

- Founded: 2004
- Country: Brazil
- Confederation: FFMS
- Promotion to: Brasileiro Série A3
- Current champions: Pantanal (1st title) (2025)
- Most championships: Comercial (5 titles)
- Current: 2026

The Campeonato Sul-Mato-Grossense de Futebol Feminino is the women's football state championship of Mato Grosso do Sul state, and is contested since 2004.

== List of champions ==
Following is the list with all recognized titles of Campeonato Sul-Mato-Grossense Feminino:

Season	Champions	Runners-up
2004	Coxim/Moreninhas (1)	Águia Negra
2005	Unknown	
2006-2007	Not held	
2008	Moreninhas (2)	Comercial
2009	Not held	
2010	Comercial (1)	Rio Verde
2011	Comercial (2)	Campo Grande
2012	Comercial (3)	Camapuã
2013	Comercial (4)	Moreninhas
2014	Chapadão (1)	Comercial
2015-2016	Not held	
2017	Comercial (5)	Misto
2018	Moreninhas (3)	Comercial
2019	Chapadão (2)	Aquidauanense
2020	Chapadão (3)	Aquidauanense
2021	Operário (1)	Chapadão
2022	Operário (2)	Chapadão
2023	Operário (3)	Corumbaense
2024	Operário (4)	Costa Rica
2025	Pantanal (1)	Corumbaense

== Titles by team ==
Teams in bold stills active.

Rank	Club	Winners	Winning years
1	Comercial	5	2010, 2011, 2012, 2013, 2017
2	Operário	4	2021, 2022, 2023, 2024
3	Chapadão	3	2014, 2019, 2021
3	Moreninhas	3	2004, 2008, 2018
5	Pantanal	1	2025
5	Coxim	1	2004

=== By city ===
City	Championships	Clubs
Campo Grande	13	Comercial (5), Operário (4), Moreninhas (3), Pantanal (1)
Chapadão do Sul	3	Chapadão (3)
Coxim	1	Coxim (1)
