= Associação Atlética Moreninhas =

Football club in Campo Grande, Brazil

Moreninhas
- Full name: Associação Atlética Moreninhas
- Nickname: AAM
- Founded: 6 March 1998; 28 years ago
- Ground: Moreninhas
- Capacity: 3,500
- 2021: Sul-Mato-Grossense Série B, 3rd of 4
Home colours	Away colours

Associação Atlética Moreninhas, commonly known as Moreninhas, is a men's and women's Brazilian football team based in Campo Grande, Mato Grosso do Sul state. The women's team competed in the Copa do Brasil de Futebol Feminino once.

== History ==
The club was founded on 5 March 1994.

=== Women's team ===
Moreninhas competed in the Copa do Brasil de Futebol Feminino in 2008, when they were eliminated in the Second Round by Aliança.

== Honours ==
=== Women's Football ===
- Campeonato Sul-Mato-Grossense Feminino
  - Winners (3): 2004, 2008, 2018

== Stadium ==
Associação Atlética Moreninhas play their home games at Estádio Jacques da Luz, nicknamed Estádio das Moreninhas and Estádio Toca do Leão. The stadium has a maximum capacity of 3,500 people.
