= Esporte Clube Campo Grande =

Campo Grande
- Full name: Esporte Clube Campo Grande
- Founded: 14 February 1993; 32 years ago
- Ground: Moreninhas
- Capacity: 4,500
- 2015: Sul-Mato-Grossense Série B, 5th of 8
Home colours	Away colours

Esporte Clube Campo Grande, commonly known as Campo Grande, is a Brazilian football team based in Campo Grande, Mato Grosso do Sul state.

== History ==
The club was founded on February 14, 1993.

== Honours ==
=== Women's Football ===
- Campeonato Sul-Mato-Grossense de Futebol Feminino
  - Winners (1): 2012

== Stadium ==
Esporte Clube Campo Grande play their home games at Estádio Jacques da Luz, nicknamed Estádio das Moreninhas. The stadium has a maximum capacity of 4,500 people.
