= Martina Del Trecco =

Argentine footballer

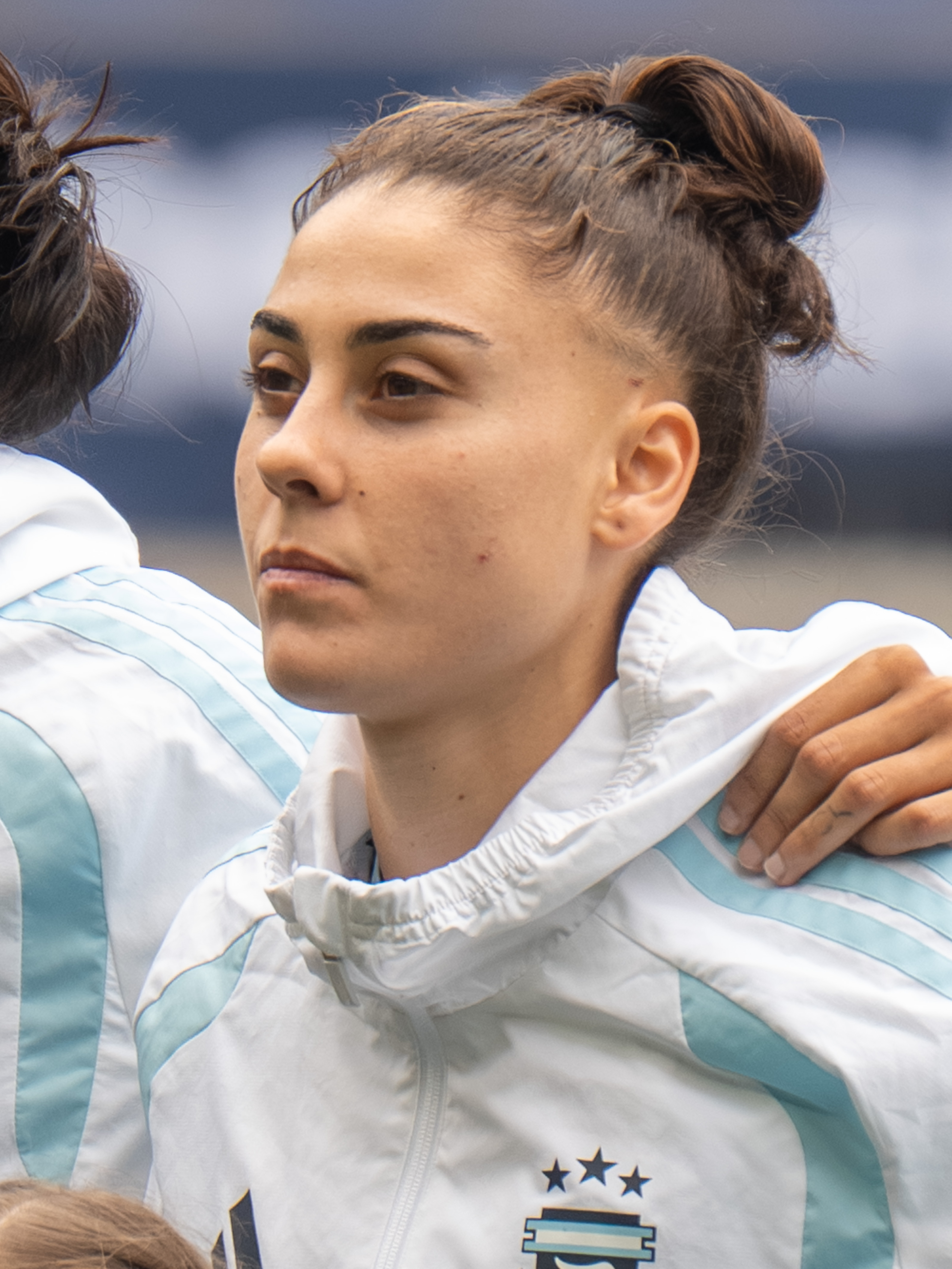
- Del Trecco with Argentina in 2026

Personal information
- Date of birth: 28 October 2001 (age 25)
- Place of birth: Villa Mercedes, San Luis, Argentina
- Height: 1.65 m (5 ft 5 in)
- Position: Forward

Team information
- Current team: Red Bull Bragantino
- Number: 9

Youth career
- Club Sportivo Pringles
- Club Atlético Aviador Origone

Senior career*
Years	Team	Apps	(Gls)
2019–2023	River Plate		
2024–2025	Dux Logroño		
2025–	Red Bull Bragantino	10	(3)

International career^{‡}
2021–	Argentina	1	(0)
- * Club domestic league appearances and goals ‡ National team caps and goals as of 8 April 2021.

Martina Del Trecco (born 28 October 2001) is an Argentine footballer who plays as a forward for Red Bull Bragantino and the Argentina women's national team.

== Club career ==
Del Trecco played for River Plate in Argentina from 2019 to 2023. On 3 February 2024, Del Trecco signed with the Spanish club Dux Logroño.

On 22 July 2025, Del Trecco signed with the Brazilian club Red Bull Bragantino. She won the Copa Paulista with the team in 2025. Her contract was originally set to expire at the end of 2025, but it has been extended through the end of 2026.

== International career ==
Del Trecco made her senior debut for Argentina on 8 April 2021 as a 78th-minute substitution in a 0–0 friendly draw against Venezuela.

== Honours ==
=== River Plate ===
- Copa Federal: 2022

=== Red Bull Bragantino ===
- Copa Paulista: 2025
