= Jarinu =

- Municipality
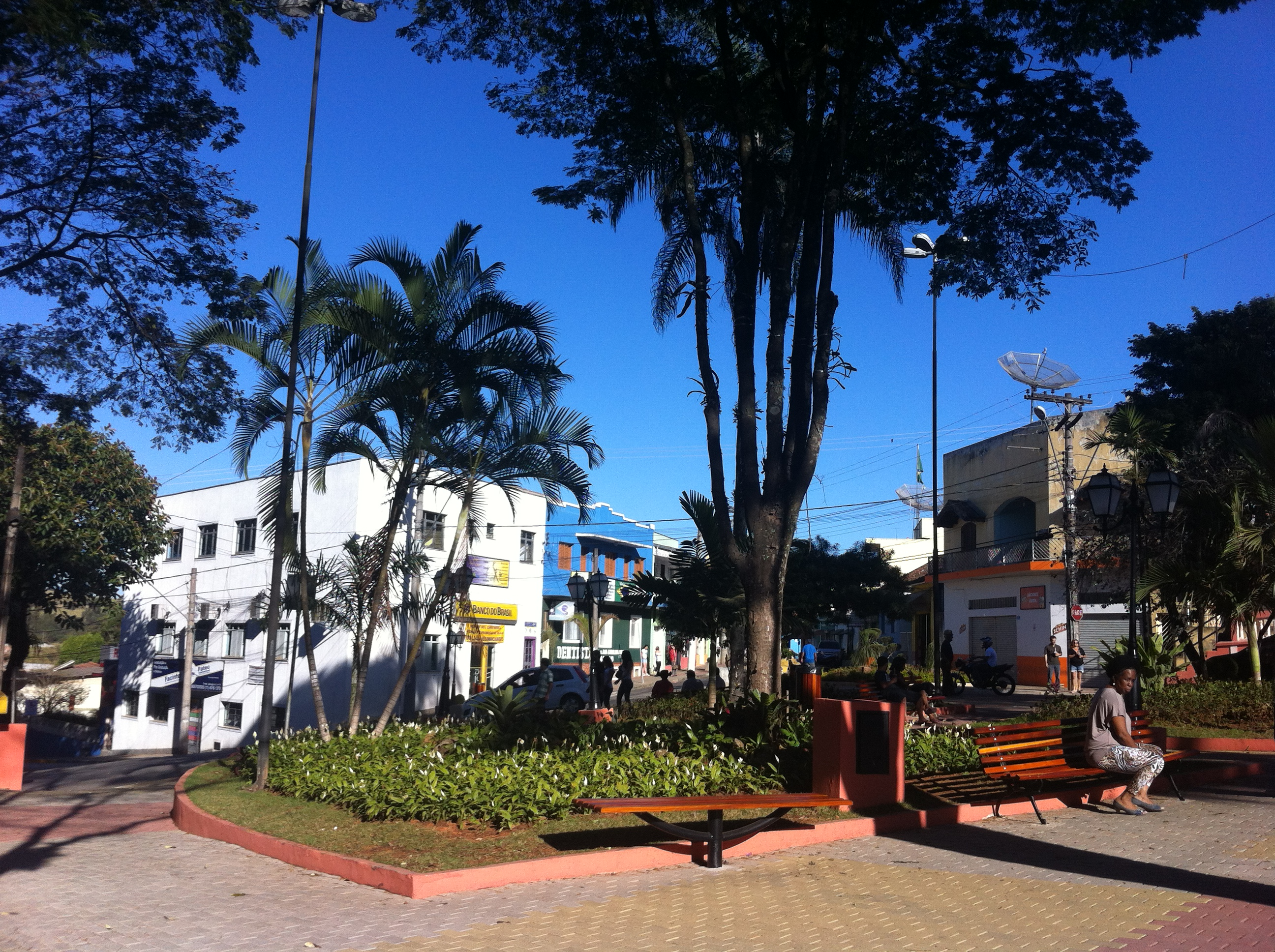
- View of Jarinu

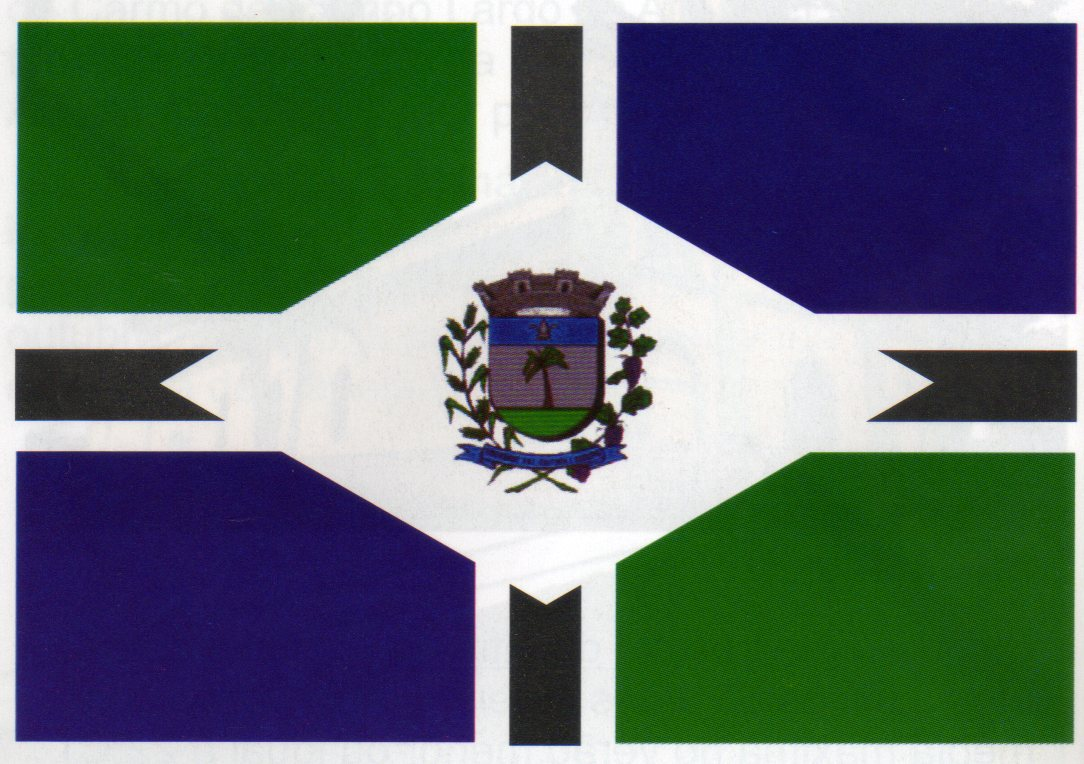
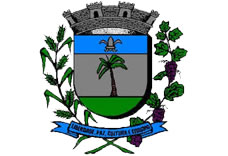
- Flag Coat of arms

- Location in São Paulo state

- Location in Brazil
- Coordinates: 23°6′5″S 46°43′42″W
- Country: Brazil
- Region: Southeast
- State: São Paulo

Area
  - Total: 208 km^{2} (80 sq mi)
- Elevation: 755 m (2,477 ft)

Population (2020)
  - Total: 30,617
  - Density: 147/km^{2} (381/sq mi)
- Time zone: UTC−3 (BRT)
- Website: www.jarinu.sp.gov.br

Jarinu is a municipality in the state of São Paulo in Brazil. The population is 30,617 (2020 est.) in an area of 208 km^{2}. The elevation is 755 m.

== History ==
The municipality was created by state law in 1948.

Map of the state of São Paulo (1948).

== Media ==
In telecommunications, the city was served by Telecomunicações de São Paulo. In July 1998, this company was acquired by Telefónica, which adopted the Vivo brand in 2012. The company is currently an operator of cell phones, fixed lines, internet (fiber optics/4G) and television (satellite and cable).

== See also ==
- List of municipalities in São Paulo
