= Jéssica Soares =

Brazilian footballer

Personal information
- Full name: Jéssica Soares da Silva
- Date of birth: 26 April 1991 (age 35)
- Place of birth: Brasília, Brazil
- Position: Left back

Team information
- Current team: São Paulo
- Number: 6

Senior career*
Years	Team	Apps	(Gls)
2012–2013	ASCOOP-DF		
2013	CRESSPOM-DF		
2014	Capital-DF		
2015–2021	Minas Brasília		
2022	Grêmio	18	(3)
2023	Ferroviária	8	(0)
2024–	São Paulo	28	(1)
- * Club domestic league appearances and goals as of 1 February 2025

Jéssica Soares da Silva (born 26 April 1991), better known as Jéssica Soares, is a Brazilian professional women's footballer who plays as a left back for São Paulo.

== Career ==
Born in Brasília, Jéssica played most of her career in teams from the Federal District, being champion on three occasions with Minas Brasília. She later played for Grêmio, where she was state champion in 2022, Ferroviária in 2023 where she was Brazilian runner-up and currently defends São Paulo FC.

== Honours ==
Minas Brasília

- Campeonato Brasiliense Feminino: 2016, 2017, 2018

Grêmio

- Campeonato Gaúcho Feminino: 2022

Ferroviária

- Copa Paulista Feminina: 2023

São Paulo

- Supercopa do Brasil: 2025
