= Futebol Clube Pantanal =

Pantanal
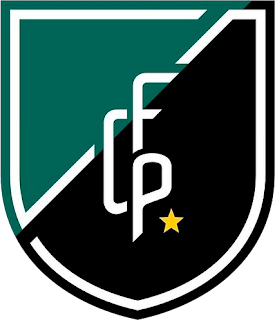
- Full name: Futebol Clube Pantanal SAF
- Nickname: Portuguesinha
- Founded: 1972; 53 years ago (amateur); 3 January 2004; 21 years ago (professional)
- Ground: Jacques da Luz
- Capacity: 4,500
- President: Gilmar Ribeiro
- Head Coach: Glauber Caldas
- League: Campeonato Sul-Mato-Grossense
- 2024: Sul-Mato-Grossense, 3rd of 10
Home colours	Away colours

Futebol Clube Pantanal SAF, commonly known as Pantanal, is a Brazilian football team based in Campo Grande, Mato Grosso do Sul. Founded as Associação Atlética Portuguesa, they won the Campeonato Sul-Mato-Grossense Série B once.

== History ==
Founded in 1972 under the name of Associação Atlética Portuguesa by Arnaldo Domingues Fernandes (a descendant of Portuguese and fan of Portuguesa de Desportos) and friends, the club only played amateur football until 2004, when they became professional after joining the year's Campeonato Sul-Mato-Grossense Série B. The club played in that category until 2010, went inactive in 2011 and returned in the following year.

After playing in the 2012 and 2013 second division, Portuguesa went inactive again, only returning ten years later in the Sul-Mato-Grossense Série B. The club then achieved a first-ever promotion to the Campeonato Sul-Mato-Grossense by winning the second division, defeating Corumbaense in the final.

On 11 November 2024, Portuguesa officially became a Sociedade Anônima do Futebol, the first in the Mato Grosso do Sul state, and changed name to Futebol Clube Pantanal. In October 2025, after the Brazilian Football Confederation promoted changes in the calendar for the 2026 season, the club qualified to the 2026 Copa do Brasil.

== Honours ==
=== State ===
- Campeonato Sul-Mato-Grossense Série B
  - Winners (1): 2023

=== Women's Football ===
- Campeonato Sul-Mato-Grossense de Futebol Feminino
  - Winners (1): 2025
