= Estádio Luso Brasileiro =

Sporting venue in Brazil

- Estádios dos Ventos Uivantes
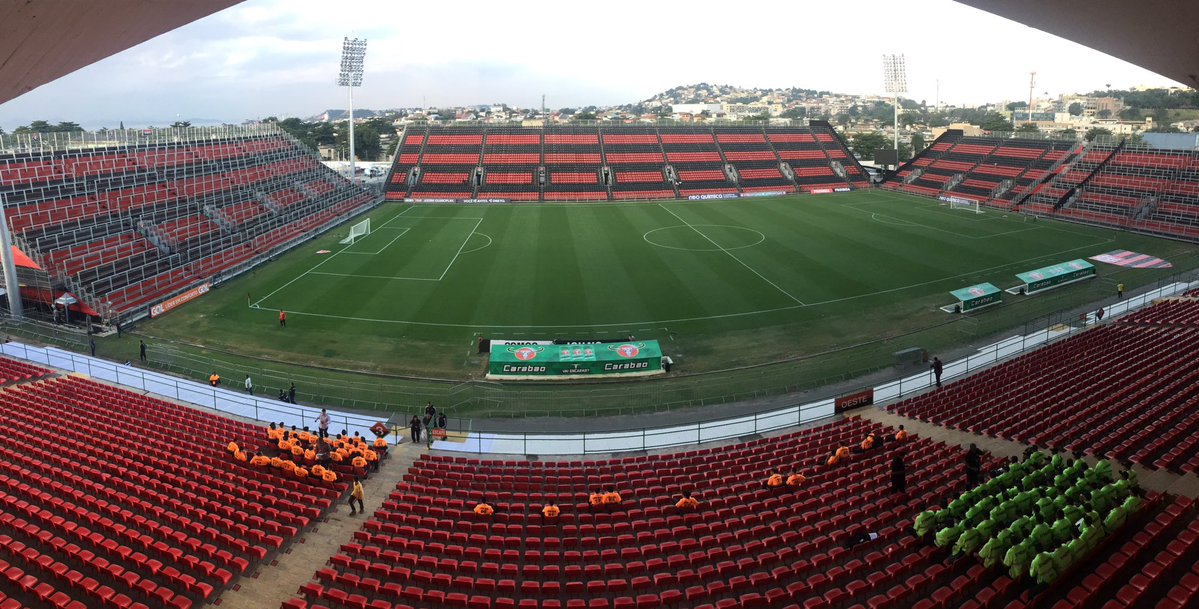
- Interactive map of Estádio Luso Brasileiro
- Full name: Estádio Luso Brasileiro
- Former names: Arena Petrobras (2005); Arena Botafogo (2016); Ilha do Urubu (2017–2018)
- Location: Rua Haroldo Lobo, 400; Ilha do Governador; Rio de Janeiro, RJ, Brazil
- Coordinates: 22°48′05.6″S 43°12′28.2″W
- Owner: Portuguesa-RJ
- Operator: Portuguesa-RJ
- Capacity: 5,994
- Surface: Celebration Itograss
- Scoreboard: JumboTron
- Record attendance: 18,204 (vs Grêmio, 13 July 2017)
- Field size: 105 by 68 metres (114.8 yd × 74.4 yd)

Construction
- Built: 1965
- Opened: 2 October 1965
- Renovated: 2017
- Expanded: 2005, 2016, 2017
- Cost: R$ 17m (2017 renovation)

Tenants
- Portuguesa-RJ (1965–present); Fluminense U23 (2022–present); Botafogo (2005, 2016); Flamengo (2005, 2017–2018)

Estádio Luso Brasileiro, formerly known as Ilha do Urubu, Arena Petrobras, Arena Botafogo and Estádio da Ilha do Governador is a football stadium inaugurated on 2 October 1965 in Ilha do Governador neighborhood, Rio de Janeiro. The maximum capacity of the stadium was 6,437 spectators, expanded to 17,250 due to renovations made by Botafogo for the 2016 Brazilian Série A. It was once again expanded to 20,113 by Flamengo in 2017. The stadium is owned by Portuguesa. Nowadays, the stadium has returned to its original capacity after the end of the partnership with Flamengo in the middle of 2018.

== History ==
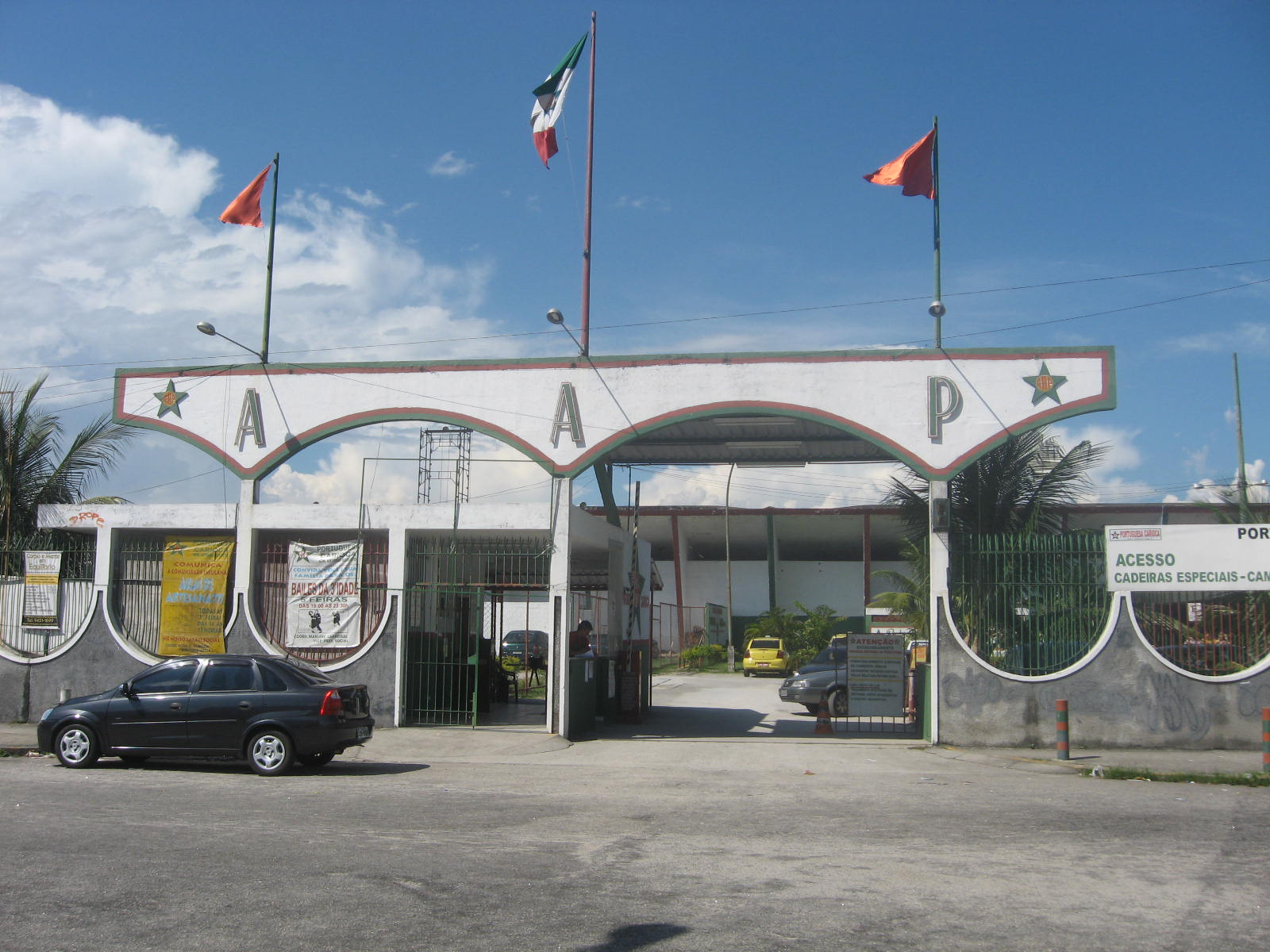
The stadium entrance.

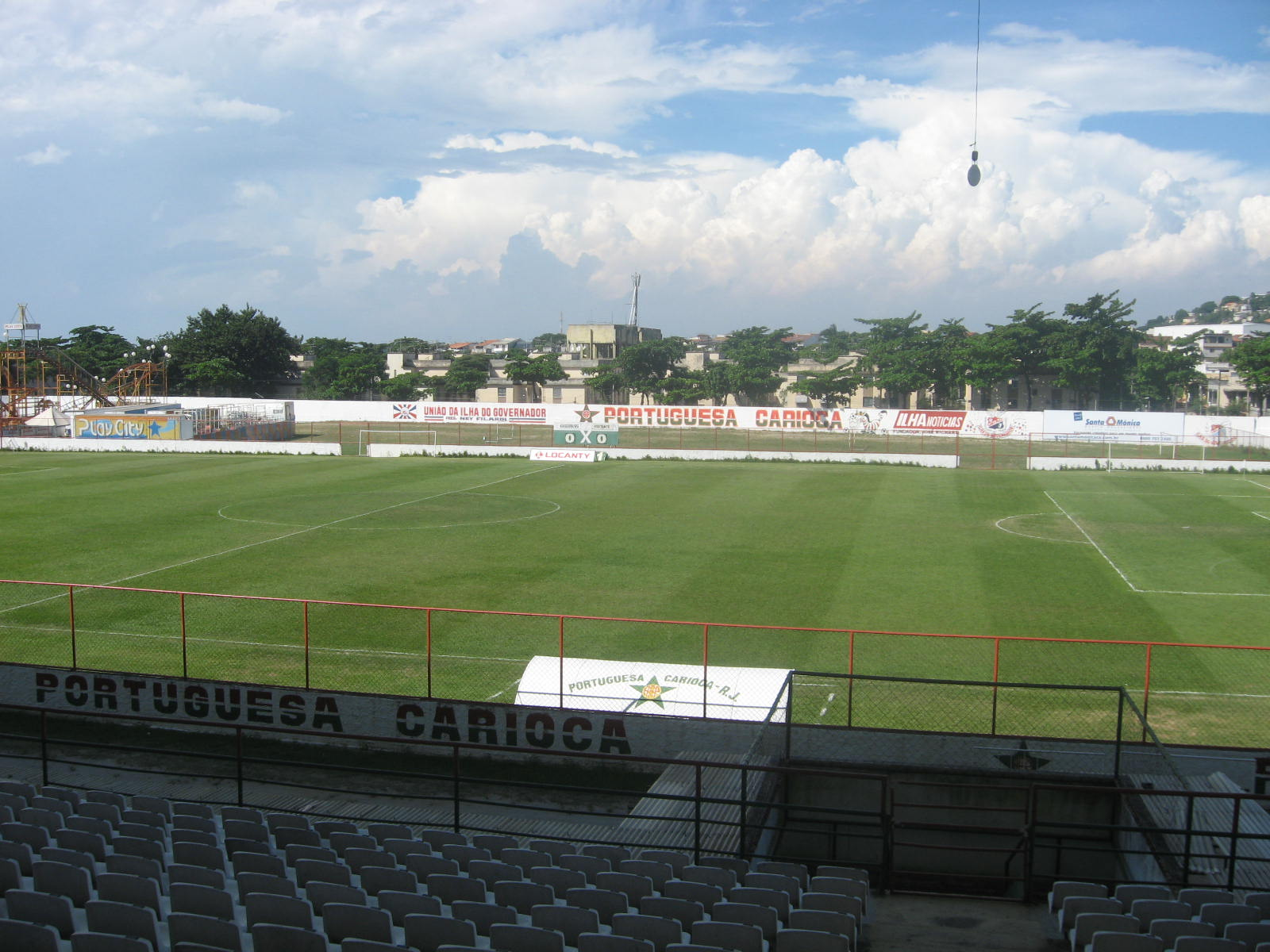
Stadium view before renovations.

The stadium was built in 1965. It was inaugurated on 2 October 1965 with a match between Portuguesa-RJ and Vasco da Gama, two among a larger number of Brazilian sports clubs with a long history linked to the Portuguese Brazilian community. In this opening match Zezinho, playing for the visitors, scored the first goals of the stadium with an attendance of 8,565 people.

=== Arena Petrobras (2005) ===
In 2005, while Maracanã was being reformed to the 2007 Pan American Games, Flamengo, Botafogo and Petrobras signed a deal to expand Luso Brasileiro stadium capacity to around 30,000 with temporary tubular structure. The works included only the stands expansion with almost no infrastructure renovation. These works expanded the maximum capacity from 5,000 to 30,000, and the stadium was adopted as the home ground of Flamengo and Botafogo during the 2005 Brazilian Série A.

=== Arena Botafogo (2016) ===
Botafogo showed interest in using the stadium again during the 2016 Campeonato Brasileiro for their home matches, as Engenhão was being prepared to host the Summer Olympics and therefore unable to receive any kind of events, including league matches, until the end of the Olympics. In April 2016 Botafogo agreed with Portuguesa-RJ to use the stadium until the end of 2016 season, Botafogo renovated the stadium and expanded the capacity to around 17,250 with provisory stands with the minimum of works to make the process quicker. The club spent about R$5 million with the stadium expansion.

Botafogo played a total of 11 Série A matches and another two Copa do Brasil matches at the stadium during 2016 with an average attendance of 8,994 per match.

==== Average league attendances ====
Club	Season	League	Capacity	Attendance	% Full
Botafogo	2016	Série A	17,250	9,829	57%

=== Ilha do Urubu (2017–2018) ===
In November 2016 Flamengo came to terms with Portuguesa-RJ and signed a three-year contract to use the stadium starting in 2017. Flamengo planned to use the stadium as cover solution due to the complicated situation between the club, the Rio de Janeiro state government and Complexo Maracanã Entretenimento S.A. (composed of Odebrecht, IMX, AEG), the operator of Maracanã Stadium. Flamengo intend to expand the capacity up to 20,500 being able to host most of the matches in the upcoming years. The club also expect to inject around R$12m with sponsor partnerships, including the naming rights. The first part in the stadium renovation was in January 2017 with the relaying of the ground.

During the stadium renovations the works suffered a series of delays including the discovery of problems with water pipes under one of the stands which created a big hole on the ground. Bureaucratic problems with the authorization to use the stadium also caused another delay in its debut from May to June. Finally, after a long waiting from the club's supporters, Flamengo was able to debut in the stadium on 14 June 2017 against Ponte Preta in a Brazilian Série A match, Flamengo won 2–0 with an attendance of 13,981 people. After several delays and administrative issues and a new contract with the Maracanã, Flamengo broke their lease with the Ilha do Urubu in July 2018.

==== Average league attendances ====
Club	Season	League	Capacity	Attendance	% Full
Flamengo	2017	Série A	20,113	12,511	62.2%

== Layout ==
Although having a capacity for 21,410 people, for safety reasons has a limited of 20,113 people per match.

=== West Stand ===
Capacity – 6,437 (seating)
The West Stand is part of the original stadium construction with the teams' locker rooms and media booth. This sector also have roof above all seats.

=== South Stand ===
Capacity – 4,122 (seating and standing)
The South Stand is built with a temporary structure and is divided in two sectors, one for the visiting team supporters with the capacity for 2,001 people all standing and another sector for the home team supporters with a capacity for 2,121 people all seated.

=== East Stand ===
Capacity – 6,437 (seating)
The East Stand is also build with a temporary structure, have the same capacity of the West Stand but with no roof covering.

=== North Stand ===
Capacity – 4,414 (standing)
The North Stand is the area designed for the most fanatic supporters with a capacity for 4,414 people all standing.
