= Fluminense FC (women) =

Women's football club based in Porto Alegre, Rio Grande do Sul, Brazil

Fluminense
- Full name: Fluminense Football Club
- Nickname: Guerreiras do Fluzão
- Founded: 11 October 2018; 7 years ago
- Ground: Estádio das Laranjeiras
- Capacity: 8,000
- President: Mário Bittencourt
- Head coach: Saulo Silva
- League: Campeonato Brasileiro Série A1; Campeonato Carioca
- 2025 2025: Série A1, 10th of 16; Carioca, 2nd of 8
Home colours	Away colours	Third colours

Fluminense Football Club, known as Fluminense, is a Brazilian women's Association football club, based in the city of Rio de Janeiro, Brazil.

== History ==
Founded on 11 October 2018 after a partnership with a social project named Daminhas da Bola, the women's football section was created mainly to comply with CONMEBOL and CBF's obligations for the 2019 season. They finished second in the Campeonato Carioca in their first two seasons of existence, while also playing in the Campeonato Brasileiro Série A2.

In June 2023, Fluminense achieved their first-ever promotion to the Campeonato Brasileiro Série A1, after defeating JC on penalties.

== Honours ==
=== Youth team ===
- Copa São Paulo de Futebol Júnior (1): 2024
- Campeonato Brasileiro Sub-18 (1): 2020
- Campeonato Carioca Sub-18 (1): 2021
- Campeonato Carioca Sub-17 (1): 2022

== Players ==
=== Current squad ===
As of 13 April 2026.

Note: Flags indicate national team as defined under FIFA eligibility rules; some limited exceptions apply. Players may hold more than one non-FIFA nationality.

No.	Pos.	Nation	Player
2	DF	BRA	Sophia
3	DF	BRA	Gislaine
4	DF	BRA	Nath Rodrigues
5	MF	BRA	Claudinha
6	DF	BRA	Tatá
7	FW	BRA	Bruna Pelé
8	MF	BRA	Karina
9	FW	BRA	Chú Santos
10	FW	BRA	Patrícia Sochor
11	FW	BRA	Kamilla
12	GK	BRA	Letícia Bussato
13	FW	BRA	Cacau
15	DF	BRA	Sorriso
16	DF	BRA	Beatriz Colares

No.	Pos.	Nation	Player
17	FW	BRA	Carioca
18	MF	BRA	Xerife
20	FW	BRA	Keké
21	FW	BRA	Lelê
23	GK	BRA	Thainá Marques
25	MF	BRA	Camilla
26	DF	BRA	Anny
33	DF	BRA	Bruna Cotrim
35	MF	BRA	Driely
41	MF	BRA	Louvain
77	FW	BRA	Raquel
81	FW	BRA	Kaline
97	MF	BRA	Dani Venturini
99	GK	BRA	Kemelli Trugilho

== See also ==
- Fluminense FC
