= 2022 Santos FC (women) season =

Santos
2022 season
- President: Andrés Rueda
- Coach: Tatiele Silveira (until 8 August); Fabi Guedes (caretaker, 8 August – 29 August); Kleiton Lima (since 29 August)
- Stadium: Vila Belmiro
- Campeonato Brasileiro: First stage
- Campeonato Paulista: Runners-up
- Ladies Cup: First stage
Home colours	Away colours	Third colours

The 2022 season was Santos FC's 23rd season in existence and the club's eighth consecutive season in the top flight of Brazilian football. As well as the Campeonato Brasileiro, the club competed in the Campeonato Paulista.

== Players ==
=== Squad information ===
Note: Flags indicate national team as defined under FIFA eligibility rules; some limited exceptions apply. Players may hold more than one non-FIFA nationality.

No.	Pos.	Nation	Player
1	GK	BRA	Vivi
2	DF	BRA	Tayla
3	DF	ARG	Eliana Stábile
4	DF	BRA	Camila
5	MF	BRA	Brena
6	DF	BRA	Jajá
7	FW	BRA	Ketlen
8	MF	BRA	Jane Tavares
9	DF	BRA	Giovanna Oliveira
10	FW	BRA	Thaisinha
11	FW	BRA	Cristiane
12	GK	BRA	Camila Rodrigues
13	DF	BRA	Bruninha
14	MF	BRA	Ana Carla

No.	Pos.	Nation	Player
17	MF	BRA	Marzia
18	MF	BRA	Júlia Daltoé
20	DF	BRA	Kaká
21	MF	BRA	Nicole Marussi
22	DF	BRA	Sassá
23	DF	BRA	Bia Menezes
24	GK	BRA	Anna Beatriz
25	MF	BRA	Laura Valverde
27	MF	BRA	Analuyza
28	DF	BRA	Giovanna Fernandes
29	FW	BRA	Gadu
32	FW	BRA	Fernandinha
99	MF	BRA	Erikinha

=== Appearances and goals ===
No.	Pos.	Nat	Name	Brasileirão		Paulista		Ladies Cup		Total	
No.	Pos.	Nat	Name	Apps	Goals	Apps	Goals	Apps	Goals	Apps	Goals
24	GK	(Brazil)	Anna Beatriz	2+1	0	7	0	0	0	10	0
12	GK	(Brazil)	Camila Rodrigues	0	0	7	0	3	0	10	0
1	GK	(Brazil)	Vivi	13	0	1+1	0	0	0	15	0
23	DF	(Brazil)	Bia Menezes	8+3	0	14	0	3	0	28	0
13	DF	(Brazil)	Bruninha	5+3	0	0	0	0	0	8	0
4	DF	(Brazil)	Camila	5+2	0	8	2	1	0	16	2
3	DF	(Argentina)	Eliana Stábile	7+4	0	1+9	0	0	0	21	0
28	DF	(Brazil)	Giovanna Fernandes	0+3	1	8+3	0	3	0	17	1
9	DF	(Brazil)	Giovanna Oliveira	12+1	0	8+5	1	0+3	0	29	1
6	DF	(Brazil)	Jajá	2+5	0	0+1	0	0	0	8	0
20	DF	(Brazil)	Kaká	8+1	0	5+5	1	3	1	22	2
22	DF	(Brazil)	Sassá	1	0	3	0	2+1	0	7	0
2	DF	(Brazil)	Tayla	14	0	13+1	1	0	0	28	1
14	MF	(Brazil)	Ana Carla	9+3	4	15	2	3	1	30	7
27	MF	(Brazil)	Analuyza	0+2	0	0+4	0	0+1	0	7	0
5	MF	(Brazil)	Brena	14	3	15	3	3	0	32	6
99	MF	(Brazil)	Erikinha	2+4	0	0+8	1	0+2	0	16	1
8	MF	(Brazil)	Jane Tavares	10+5	1	13	1	3	0	31	2
18	MF	(Brazil)	Júlia Daltoé	2+10	2	0+4	1	0	0	16	3
25	MF	(Brazil)	Laura Valverde	4+2	0	0+9	0	0+1	0	16	0
17	MF	(Brazil)	Marzia	0	0	0	0	0+1	0	1	0
21	MF	(Brazil)	Nicole Marussi	0+2	0	0+2	0	0	0	4	0
11	FW	(Brazil)	Cristiane	15	13	15	19	3	2	33	34
32	FW	(Brazil)	Fernandinha	12+1	4	15	6	3	1	31	11
29	FW	(Brazil)	Gadu	0+7	0	0+7	0	0+1	0	15	0
7	FW	(Brazil)	Ketlen	9+3	4	2+13	8	0+3	0	30	12
10	FW	(Brazil)	Thaisinha	11+4	1	15	5	3	3	33	9

Last updated: 15 March 2024
Source: Match reports in Competitive matches, Soccerway

=== Goalscorers ===
Ran	No.	Pos	Nat	Name	Brasileirão	Paulista	Ladies Cup	Total
1	11	FW	(Brazil)	Cristiane	13	19	2	34
2	7	FW	(Brazil)	Ketlen	4	8	0	12
3	32	FW	(Brazil)	Fernandinha	4	6	1	11
4	10	FW	(Brazil)	Thaisinha	1	5	3	9
5	14	MF	(Brazil)	Ana Carla	4	2	1	7
6	5	MF	(Brazil)	Brena	3	3	0	6
7	18	MF	(Brazil)	Júlia Daltoé	2	1	0	3
8	4	DF	(Brazil)	Camila	0	2	0	2
8	8	MF	(Brazil)	Jane Tavares	1	1	0	2
8	20	DF	(Brazil)	Kaká	0	1	1	2
9	99	MF	(Brazil)	Erikinha	0	1	0	1
9	28	DF	(Brazil)	Giovanna Fernandes	1	0	0	1
9	9	DF	(Brazil)	Giovanna Oliveira	0	1	0	1
9	2	DF	(Brazil)	Tayla	0	1	0	1
Own goals					0	1	0	1
Total					33	52	8	93

Last updated: 15 March 2024
Source: Match reports in Competitive matches

=== Disciplinary record ===
N	Nat	Pos	Name	Brasileiro			Paulista			Ladies Cup			Total		
N	Nat	Pos	Name	Yellow card	(yellow card) (yellow-red card)	Red card	Yellow card	(yellow card) (yellow-red card)	Red card	Yellow card	(yellow card) (yellow-red card)	Red card	Yellow card	(yellow card) (yellow-red card)	Red card
32	(Brazil)	FW	Fernandinha	4	1	0	1	0	0	0	0	0	5	1	0
4	(Brazil)	DF	Camila	3	0	1	1	0	0	0	0	0	4	0	1
5	(Brazil)	MF	Brena	4	0	0	1	0	0	1	0	0	6	0	0
11	(Brazil)	FW	Cristiane	1	0	0	4	0	0	1	0	0	6	0	0
9	(Brazil)	DF	Giovanna Oliveira	4	0	0	2	0	0	0	0	0	6	0	0
2	(Brazil)	DF	Tayla	1	0	0	5	0	0	0	0	0	6	0	0
14	(Brazil)	MF	Ana Carla	2	0	0	1	0	0	0	0	0	3	0	0
20	(Brazil)	DF	Kaká	1	0	0	2	0	0	0	0	0	3	0	0
10	(Brazil)	FW	Thaisinha	2	0	0	1	0	0	0	0	0	3	0	0
23	(Brazil)	DF	Bia Menezes	1	0	0	1	0	0	0	0	0	2	0	0
3	(Argentina)	DF	Eliana Stábile	1	0	0	1	0	0	0	0	0	2	0	0
8	(Brazil)	MF	Jane Tavares	0	0	0	2	0	0	0	0	0	2	0	0
24	(Brazil)	GK	Anna Beatriz	0	0	0	1	0	0	0	0	0	1	0	0
13	(Brazil)	DF	Bruninha	1	0	0	0	0	0	0	0	0	1	0	0
6	(Brazil)	DF	Jajá	1	0	0	0	0	0	0	0	0	1	0	0
7	(Brazil)	FW	Ketlen	1	0	0	0	0	0	0	0	0	1	0	0
25	(Brazil)	MF	Laura Valverde	1	0	0	0	0	0	0	0	0	1	0	0
TOTALS				28	1	1	23	0	0	2	0	0	53	1	1

=== Suspensions served ===
Date	Matches Missed	Player	Reason	Opponents Missed	Competition
25 April	1	Brena	3x (yellow card)	Atlético Mineiro (A)	Campeonato Brasileiro
29 May	1	Fernandinha	3x (yellow card)	ESMAC (H)	Campeonato Brasileiro
29 May	1	Giovanna Oliveira	3x (yellow card)	ESMAC (H)	Campeonato Brasileiro
5 June	1	Camila	(red card) vs ESMAC	Cruzeiro (A)	Campeonato Brasileiro
15 June	1	Fernandinha	(red card) vs Cruzeiro	Bragantino (H)	Campeonato Brasileiro
19 June	1	Camila	3x (yellow card)	Internacional (A)	Campeonato Brasileiro
2 November	1	Tayla	3x (yellow card)	Corinthians (A)	Campeonato Paulista

Source: Match reports in Competitive matches

== Transfers ==
=== Transfers in ===
N.	Pos.	Name	Age	Moving from	Source
32	FW	(Brazil) Fernandinha	28	Vittsjö GIK (Sweden)	
9	RB	(Brazil) Giovanna Oliveira	29	Avaldsnes IL (Norway)	
1	GK	(Brazil) Vivi Holzel	32	Internacional	
24	GK	(Brazil) Anna Bia	21	Bahia	
20	DF	(Brazil) Kaká	22	Minas Brasília	
14	MIF	(Brazil) Ana Carla	27	Flamengo	
8	MIF	(Brazil) Jane Tavares	29	Grêmio	
3	LB	(Argentina) Eliana Stábile	28	Boca Juniors (Argentina)	
29	FW	(Brazil) Gadu	24	Bahia	
6	DF	(Brazil) Jajá	27	Bahia	

=== Transfers out ===
N.	Pos.	Name	Age	Moving to	Source
9	FW	(Brazil) Byanca Brasil	26	Palmeiras	
30	FW	(Brazil) Karen	32	Cruzeiro	
19	FW	(Brazil) Amanda Gutierres	20	Bordeaux (France)	
14	LB	(Brazil) Fernanda Palermo	25	São Paulo	
6	DF	(Brazil) Day Silva	31	Palmeiras	
8	MF	(Brazil) Rita Bove	31	Cruzeiro	
1	GK	(Brazil) Michelle	32	São Paulo	
12	GK	(Brazil) Dida	30	Real Brasília	
18	FW	(Brazil) Maria Dias	26	Real Brasília	
26	MF	(Brazil) Luaninha	19	Famalicão (Portugal)	
29	MF	(Brazil) Alanna	31	3B da Amazônia	
13	RB	(Brazil) Bruninha	20	Gotham FC (United States)	

== Competitions ==
=== Campeonato Brasileiro ===
==== Results summary ====
Overall								Home						Away					
Pld	W	D	L	GF	GA	GD	Pts	W	D	L	GF	GA	GD	W	D	L	GF	GA	GD
15	6	2	7	33	24	+9	20	5	2	1	22	10	+12	1	0	6	11	14	−3

Source: Soccerway

==== First stage ====
Pos	Team	Pld	W	D	L	GF	GA	GD	Pts	Qualification or relegation
7	Ferroviária	15	7	3	5	23	14	+9	24	Advance to Quarter-finals
8	Grêmio	15	5	6	4	22	18	+4	21	Advance to Quarter-finals
9	Santos	15	6	2	7	33	24	+9	20	
10	Avaí/Kindermann	15	6	2	7	16	26	−10	20	
11	Atlético Mineiro	15	5	4	6	17	17	0	19	

Source: CBF

===== Matches =====
6 March 1	Real Brasília	3–1	Santos	Vila Planalto
15:00 UTC-03:00	Gaby Soares 12'; Sassá 17'; Rafa Soares 52'	Report	68' Ketlen	Stadium: Defelê; Referee: Marcello Ruda Neves Ramos da Costa

13 March 2	Santos	4–1	São José	Santos
11:00 UTC-03:00	Fernandinha 10'; Ketlen 23'; Cristiane 34', 45+1' (pen.)	Report	32' Juliana Oliveira; (yellow card) 88' Camila Santos	Stadium: Vila Belmiro; Referee: Lucas Canetto Bellote

19 March 3	Palmeiras	1–0	Santos	São Paulo
14:00 UTC-03:00	Andressinha (yellow card) 56'; Duda Santos (yellow card) 86'; Camilinha 90+1'	Report	(yellow card) 37' Bruninha; (yellow card) 45+1' Brena; (yellow card) 57' Tayla	Stadium: Allianz Parque; Referee: Fabiano Monteiro dos Santos

27 March 4	Santos	1–2	Corinthians	Santos
11:00 UTC-03:00	Brena (yellow card) 19'; Fernandinha (yellow card) 50'; Cristiane 74'	Report	25' (o.g.) Brena; (yellow card) 60' Liana Salazar; (yellow card) 85' (yellow-red card) 90+2' Grazi; 90' Mylena Freitas	Stadium: Vila Belmiro; Referee: Adeli Mara Monteiro

3 April 5	Avaí Kindermann	0–5	Santos	Caçador
15:00 UTC-03:00	Kamila (yellow card) 49'; Fabiola Sandoval (yellow card) 58'; Luana Marques (yellow card) 71'; Camilla (yellow card) 81'	Report	12', 60' Ana Carla; 14', 44' Cristiane; (yellow card) 73' Giovanna Oliveira; 90+2' Fernandinha	Stadium: Salézio Kindermann; Referee: Charly Wendy Straub Deretti

18 April 6	Santos	6–0	CRESSPOM	Santos
20:00 UTC-03:00	Ana Carla 24', 57'; Cristiane 28', 53'; Fernandinha 42'; Bia Menezes (yellow card) 48'; Giovanna Oliveira (yellow card) 51'; Júlia Daltoé 69'	Report	(yellow card) 79' Nath Pitbull	Stadium: Vila Belmiro; Referee: Adriano de Assis Miranda

25 April 7	Santos	2–1	Grêmio	Santos
20:00 UTC-03:00	Cristiane 9'; Thaisinha 30'; Brena (yellow card) 87'	Report	20' Jéssica Soares; (yellow card) 59' Sinara	Stadium: Vila Belmiro; Referee: Lucas Canetto Bellote

2 May 8	Atlético-MG	2–1	Santos	Belo Horizonte
20:00 UTC-03:00	Jayanne (yellow card) 12'; Yisela Cuesta 81'; Bruna Cotrim 88' (pen.) (yellow card) 90+4'	Report	15' (yellow card) 59' Fernandinha; (yellow card) 45+1' Laura Valverde; (yellow card) 63' Camila; (yellow card) 77' Cristiane	Stadium: Alterosas; Referee: André Luiz Skettino

14 May 9	Santos	2–1	São Paulo	Santos
14:00 UTC-03:00	Cristiane 67'; Júlia Daltoé 90+5'	Report	45' Fê Palermo; (yellow card) 59' Maressa	Stadium: Vila Belmiro; Referee: Marianna Nanni Batalha

29 May 10	Ferroviária	1–0	Santos	Araraquara
18:00 UTC-03:00	Laryh 9'; Luana Sartório (yellow card) 57'; Camila Silva (yellow card) 69'; Daiane Rodrigues (yellow card) 90+2'	Report	(yellow card) 46' Giovanna Oliveira; (yellow card) 81' Fernandinha	Stadium: Fonte Luminosa; Referee: Adeli Mara Monteiro

5 June 11	Santos	5–3	ESMAC	Santos
10:00 UTC-03:00	Cristiane 4' (pen.), 58'; Ketlen 8'; Camila (yellow card) 13' (red card) 31'; Ana Carla (yellow card) 57'; Jane Tavares 78'; Brena 90'	Report	(yellow card) 3' (goal) 34' Nathalia Branco; 26' Luciene Baião; (yellow card) 55' (goal) 60' Lora Capanema	Stadium: Vila Belmiro; Referee: Fabiano Monteiro dos Santos

15 June 12	Cruzeiro	4–2	Santos	Belo Horizonte
15:30 UTC-03:00	Giovanna Oliveira 6' (o.g.); Mariana Santos 23'; Laysla 31'; Carol (yellow card) 41'; Robinha (yellow card) 50' (yellow-red card) 78'; Mariana Neiva 69' (pen.)	Report	(yellow card) 8' (yellow-red card) 53' Fernandinha; 28' (pen.) Cristiane; (yellow card) 56' Jajá; (yellow card) 63' Thaisinha; 74' Ketlen	Stadium: Alterosas; Referee: Andreza Helena de Siqueira

19 June 13	Santos	1–1	Bragantino	Santos
10:00 UTC-03:00	Ketlen (yellow card) 33'; Camila (yellow card) 38'; Giovanna Fernandes 85'	Report	(yellow card) 35' Rhayanna; 45+3' Mylena Pedroso; (yellow card) 90' Alice Tosta	Stadium: Vila Belmiro; Referee: Marianna Nanni Batalha

3 August 14	Internacional	3–2	Santos	Porto Alegre
15:00 UTC-03:00	Sorriso (red card) 30'; Belinha 47'; Millene 64', 81'; Fabi Simões (yellow card) 71'; Duda Sampaio (yellow card) 90+1'	Report	31' (yellow card) 41' Brena; (yellow card) 78' Eliana Stábile; (yellow card) 86' Kaká; 89' Cristiane; (yellow card) 90+4' Giovanna Oliveira	Stadium: Beira-Rio; Referee: Lucas Rechatiko Horn

7 August 15	Santos	1–1	Flamengo/Marinha	Barueri
11:00 UTC-03:00	Brena 10'; Ana Carla (yellow card) 42'; Thaisinha (yellow card) 77'	Report	(yellow card) 77' Isadora Freitas; (yellow card) 78' Daiane Santos; 88' (pen.) Duda Francelino	Stadium: Arena Barueri; Referee: Thiago Lourenço de Mattos

=== Campeonato Paulista ===
==== Results summary ====
Overall								Home						Away					
Pld	W	D	L	GF	GA	GD	Pts	W	D	L	GF	GA	GD	W	D	L	GF	GA	GD
15	10	1	4	52	15	+37	31	6	0	2	32	8	+24	4	1	2	20	7	+13

Source: Soccerway

==== First stage ====
Pos	Team	Pld	W	D	L	GF	GA	GD	Pts	Qualification
1	Palmeiras	11	9	1	1	30	7	+23	28	Advance to Semi-final
2	São Paulo	11	9	0	2	33	6	+27	27	Advance to Semi-final
3	Santos	11	8	1	2	47	10	+37	25	Advance to Semi-final
4	Ferroviaria	11	8	0	3	31	11	+20	24	Advance to Semi-final
5	Corinthians	11	8	0	3	28	9	+19	24	

Updated to match(es) played on 23 November 2022. Source: FPF
Rules for classification: 1) points; 2) wins; 3) goal difference; 4) goals scored; 5) head-to-head results (only between 2 teams); 6) fewest red cards; 7) fewest yellow cards; 8) draw.

===== Matches =====
11 August 1	Ferroviária	0–4	Santos	Araraquara
15:00 UTC-03:00	Carol Tavares (yellow card) 17'; Raissa Silva (yellow card) 36'	Report	16' Cristiane; (yellow card) 30' Giovanna Oliveira; (yellow card) 31' Tayla; (yellow card) 59' Kaká; 69' Ketlen; 70' Jane Tavares; 83' Brena	Stadium: Fonte Luminosa; Referee: José Guilherme Almeida e Souza

18 August 2	Santos	5–1	São José	Barueri
15:00 UTC-03:00	Juju 27' (o.g.); Cristiane 43' (pen.); Thaisinha 72'; Fernandinha 78'; Júlia Daltoé 84'	Report	(yellow card) 56' Sara Piveta; 62' Juliana Oliveira	Stadium: Arena Barueri; Referee: Fabiano Monteiro dos Santos

24 August 3	Palmeiras	2–2	Santos	Barueri
15:30 UTC-03:00	Júlia Bianchi 1' (yellow card) 21'; Sâmia Pryscila (yellow card) 28'; Jully (yellow card) 71'; Camilinha 72'	Report	4' Cristiane; (yellow card) 43' Brena; 45' Fernandinha; (yellow card) 50' Thaisinha; (yellow card) 71' Ana Carla; (yellow card) 78' Anna Beatriz	Stadium: Arena Barueri; Referee: Pablo Rodrigo Soares de Oliveira

8 September 4	Santos	5–0	Portuguesa	Barueri
15:00 UTC-03:00	Cristiane 6', 83'; Fernandinha 18'; Ana Carla 25'; Ketlen 89'	Report	(yellow card) 57' Thaís Gabrielle; (yellow card) 90+2' Sabrina Silva	Stadium: Arena Barueri; Referee: Marianna Nanni Batalha

14 September 5	Santos	7–0	EC São Bernardo	Santos
15:00 UTC-03:00	Camila 2'; Tayla 5'; Cristiane 21', 27', 37', 90+1'; Thaisinha 43' (pen.)	Report		Stadium: Vila Belmiro; Referee: Gabriel Henrique Meira Bispo

22 September 6	Taubaté	0–4	Santos	Taubaté
19:30 UTC-03:00	Tatá (yellow card) 9'; Tábata Vieira (yellow card) 45+1'; Hericka Sorriso (yellow card) 58'	Report	1' Cristiane; (yellow card) 9' Fernandinha; 25' Camila; 32', 54' Thaisinha; (yellow card) 63' Jane Tavares; (yellow card) 84' Tayla	Stadium: Joaquim de Moraes Filho; Referee: Gabriel Furlan

28 September 7	Santos	0–5	São Paulo	Santos
15:00 UTC-03:00	Cristiane (yellow card) 19'; Camila (yellow card) 70'	Report	5', 65' Naná; 21' (yellow card) 47' Micaelly; 41' Thaís Regina; 58' (yellow card) 89' Aline Milene; (yellow card) 70' Carol Nogueira; (yellow card) 90+2' Ana Clara	Stadium: Vila Belmiro; Referee: Gustavo Holanda Souza

2 November 8	Santos	3–1	Bragantino	Santos
15:00 UTC-03:00	Fernandinha 4'; Cristiane 15'; Tayla (yellow card) 20'; Jane Tavares (yellow card) 27'; Ketlen 54'; Eliana Stábile (yellow card) 85'; Kaká (yellow card) 90+3'	Report	(yellow card) 17' Taba; 22' (pen.) Rhayanna; (yellow card) 59' Mylena Pedroso; (yellow card) 87' Ingryd Avancini	Stadium: Vila Belmiro; Referee: Michel de Camargo

16 November 9	Corinthians	1–0	Santos	São Paulo
19:30 UTC-03:00	Victória Albuquerque 24'; Mariza (yellow card) 45'; Lelê (yellow card) 90+1'	Report		Stadium: Arena Corinthians; Referee: Edina Alves Batista

19 November 10	Pinda Ferroviária	0–6	Santos	Pindamonhangaba
15:00 UTC-03:00	Kety (yellow card) 85'	Report	1' Brena; 5' Fernandinha; 7' Cristiane; 14', 22' Ketlen; 31' Kaká	Stadium: Antônio Pinheiro Júnior; Referee: Thiago Lourenço de Mattos

23 November 11	Santos	11–0	Realidade Jovem	Barueri
19:00 UTC-03:00	Cristiane 11', 15', 32', 51', 57'; Ana Carla 20'; Thaisinha 45'; Ketlen 67', 73'; Erikinha 74'; Giovanna Oliveira 87'	Report		Stadium: Arena Barueri; Referee: Marianna Nanni Batalha

==== Semifinal ====
7 December 1st Leg	Santos	1–0	São Paulo	Santos
21:30 UTC-03:00	Brena 70'	Report	(yellow card) 72' Pardal	Stadium: Vila Belmiro; Referee: Gabriel Henrique Meira Bispo

11 December 2nd Leg	São Paulo	2–3 (2–4 agg.)	Santos	São Paulo
19:00 UTC-03:00	Naná 9'; Maressa (yellow card) 78'; Carlinha (yellow card) 87'; Pardal 90'	Report	22', 27' (yellow card) 38' Cristiane; 46' Fernandinha	Stadium: Morumbi; Referee: Michel de Camargo

==== Final ====
17 December 1st Leg	Santos	0–1	Palmeiras	Santo André
19:00 UTC-03:00	Cristiane (yellow card) 51'; Bia Menezes (yellow card) 69'; Tayla (yellow card) 91'	Report	(yellow card) 47' Camilinha; (yellow card) 78' Ary Borges; 93' Patrícia Sochor	Stadium: Bruno José Daniel; Referee: Marianna Nanni Batalha

21 December 2nd Leg	Palmeiras	2–1 (3–1 agg.)	Santos	São Paulo
15:30 UTC-03:00	Bia Zaneratto 67'; Ary Borges 77'; Carol Baiana (yellow card) 88'	Report	(yellow card) 38' Tayla; (yellow card) 47' Giovanna Oliveira; (yellow card) 75' Cristiane; 82' Ketlen	Stadium: Allianz Parque; Referee: Edina Alves Batista

=== Ladies Cup ===
==== First stage ====
Group B
Pos	Team	Pld	W	D	L	GF	GA	GD	Pts
1	Internacional	3	2	1	0	8	3	+5	7
2	Santos	3	2	0	1	8	3	+5	6
3	Palmeiras	3	1	0	2	1	9	−8	3
4	Atlético de Madrid	3	0	1	2	5	7	−2	1

Updated to match(es) played on 13 November 2022. Source: FPF

===== Matches =====
9 November 1	Palmeiras	0–5	Santos	Jaú
16:00 UTC-03:00	Giovana (yellow card) 67'; Evelin Tosetto (yellow card) 73'	Report	13', 38' Thaisinha; (yellow card) 70' (goal) 69', 76' Cristiane; 86' Ana Carla	Stadium: Zezinho Magalhães; Referee: Renan Pantoja de Quequi

11 November 2	Santos	0–1	Internacional	Jaú
21:00 UTC-03:00	Brena (yellow card) 74'	Report	(yellow card) 8' Djeni; (yellow card) 21' Juliana Ferreira; 34' Fabi Simões; (yellow card) 83' Tamara	Stadium: Zezinho Magalhães; Referee: Rogério Fernando Alves Júnior

13 November 3	Santos	3–2	Atlético de Madrid	Jaú
13:00 UTC-03:00	Fernandinha 18'; Thaisinha 31'; Kaká 85'	Report	(yellow card) 27' Ainhoa Moraza; 54' Laura Rodríguez; (yellow card) 65' Rasheedat Ajibade; (yellow card) 80' Raquel Gómez; 82' Martha Ruiz	Stadium: Zezinho Magalhães; Referee: João Augusto Mariano de Oliveira

== See also ==
- 2022 Santos FC season
