= 2022 in Brazilian football =

Football in Brazil
- Season: 2022

Men's football
- Série A: Palmeiras
- Série B: Cruzeiro
- Série C: Mirassol
- Série D: América de Natal
- Copa do Brasil: Flamengo
- Supercopa: Atlético Mineiro

Women's football
- Série A1: Corinthians
- Série A2: Ceará
- Série A3: AD Taubaté
- Supercopa Feminina: Corinthians

The following article presents a summary of the 2022 football (soccer) season in Brazil, which was the 121st season of competitive football in the country.

== Campeonato Brasileiro Série A ==
The 2022 Campeonato Brasileiro Série A started on 9 April 2022 and ended on 13 November 2022.

- América Mineiro
- Athletico Paranaense
- Atlético Goianiense
- Atlético Mineiro
- Avaí
- Botafogo
- Ceará
- Corinthians
- Coritiba
- Cuiabá
- Flamengo
- Fluminense
- Fortaleza
- Goiás
- Internacional
- Juventude
- Palmeiras
- Red Bull Bragantino
- Santos
- São Paulo

Pos	Team	Pld	W	D	L	GF	GA	GD	Pts	Qualification or relegation
1	Palmeiras (C)	38	23	12	3	66	27	+39	81	Qualification for Copa Libertadores group stage (Note: Flamengo qualified for the Copa Libertadores group stage by winning the 2022 Copa Libertadores. Since they also won the 2022 Copa do Brasil, the berth awarded to the Copa do Brasil champions (Copa Libertadores group stage) was passed over to the league's best placed team not already qualified.)
2	Internacional	38	20	13	5	58	31	+27	73	Qualification for Copa Libertadores group stage
3	Fluminense	38	21	7	10	63	41	+22	70	Qualification for Copa Libertadores group stage
4	Corinthians	38	18	11	9	44	36	+8	65	Qualification for Copa Libertadores group stage
5	Flamengo	38	18	8	12	60	39	+21	62	Qualification for Copa Libertadores group stage
6	Athletico Paranaense	38	16	10	12	48	48	0	58	Qualification for Copa Libertadores group stage
7	Atlético Mineiro	38	15	13	10	45	37	+8	58	Qualification for Copa Libertadores second stage
8	Fortaleza	38	15	10	13	46	39	+7	55	Qualification for Copa Libertadores second stage
9	São Paulo	38	13	15	10	55	42	+13	54	Qualification for Copa Sudamericana group stage
10	América Mineiro	38	15	8	15	40	40	0	53	Qualification for Copa Sudamericana group stage
11	Botafogo	38	15	8	15	41	43	−2	53	Qualification for Copa Sudamericana group stage
12	Santos	38	12	11	15	44	41	+3	47	Qualification for Copa Sudamericana group stage
13	Goiás	38	11	13	14	40	53	−13	46	Qualification for Copa Sudamericana group stage
14	Red Bull Bragantino	38	11	11	16	49	59	−10	44	Qualification for Copa Sudamericana group stage
15	Coritiba	38	12	6	20	39	60	−21	42	
16	Cuiabá	38	10	11	17	31	42	−11	41	
17	Ceará (R)	38	7	16	15	34	41	−7	37	Relegation to Campeonato Brasileiro Série B
18	Atlético Goianiense (R)	38	8	12	18	39	57	−18	36	Relegation to Campeonato Brasileiro Série B
19	Avaí (R)	38	9	8	21	34	60	−26	35	Relegation to Campeonato Brasileiro Série B
20	Juventude (R)	38	3	13	22	29	69	−40	22	Relegation to Campeonato Brasileiro Série B

Source: CBF
Rules for classification: 1) points; 2) wins; 3) goal difference; 4) goals scored; 5) head-to-head results (only between two teams); 6) fewest red cards; 7) fewest yellow cards; 8) drawing of lots.
(C) Champions; (R) Relegated
Notes:

Palmeiras won the league.

=== Relegation ===
The four worst placed teams, Juventude, Avaí, Ceará and Atlético Goianiense, were relegated to the following year's second level.

== Campeonato Brasileiro Série B ==
The 2022 Campeonato Brasileiro Série B started on 8 April 2022 and ended on 6 November 2022.

- Bahia
- Brusque
- Chapecoense
- CRB
- Criciúma
- Cruzeiro
- CSA
- Grêmio
- Guarani
- Ituano
- Londrina
- Náutico
- Novorizontino
- Operário Ferroviário
- Ponte Preta
- Sampaio Corrêa
- Sport
- Tombense
- Vasco da Gama
- Vila Nova

Pos	Team	Pld	W	D	L	GF	GA	GD	Pts	Promotion or relegation
1	Cruzeiro (C, P)	38	23	9	6	57	26	+31	78	Promotion to 2023 Campeonato Brasileiro Série A
2	Grêmio (P)	38	17	14	7	50	26	+24	65	Promotion to 2023 Campeonato Brasileiro Série A
3	Bahia (P)	38	17	11	10	43	29	+14	62	Promotion to 2023 Campeonato Brasileiro Série A
4	Vasco da Gama (P)	38	17	11	10	48	36	+12	62	Promotion to 2023 Campeonato Brasileiro Série A
5	Sampaio Corrêa	38	16	10	12	48	42	+6	58	
6	Ituano	38	15	12	11	42	34	+8	57	
7	Sport	38	15	12	11	37	31	+6	57	
8	Criciúma	38	14	14	10	43	31	+12	56	
9	Londrina	38	14	11	13	36	37	−1	53	
10	Guarani	38	13	12	13	33	36	−3	51	
11	CRB	38	13	11	14	35	43	−8	50	
12	Ponte Preta	38	12	13	13	34	36	−2	49	
13	Vila Nova	38	9	20	9	28	31	−3	47	
14	Chapecoense	38	11	12	15	37	39	−2	45	
15	Tombense	38	10	15	13	38	47	−9	45	
16	Novorizontino	38	11	11	16	44	49	−5	44	
17	CSA (R)	38	9	15	14	29	37	−8	42	Relegation to 2023 Campeonato Brasileiro Série C
18	Brusque (R)	38	8	10	20	21	38	−17	34	Relegation to 2023 Campeonato Brasileiro Série C
19	Operário Ferroviário (R)	38	7	13	18	31	53	−22	34	Relegation to 2023 Campeonato Brasileiro Série C
20	Náutico (R)	38	8	6	24	32	65	−33	30	Relegation to 2023 Campeonato Brasileiro Série C

Source: CBF
Rules for classification: 1) points; 2) wins; 3) goal difference; 4) goals scored; 5) head-to-head results (only between 2 teams); 6) fewest red cards; 7) fewest yellow cards; 8) drawing of lots.
(C) Champions; (P) Promoted; (R) Relegated

Cruzeiro won the league.

=== Promotion ===
The four best placed teams, Cruzeiro, Grêmio, Bahia and Vasco da Gama, were promoted to the following year's first level.

=== Relegation ===
The four worst placed teams, Brusque, Náutico, Operário Ferroviário and CSA, were relegated to the following year's third level.

== Campeonato Brasileiro Série C ==
The 2022 Campeonato Brasileiro Série C started on 9 April 2022 and ended on 8 October 2022.

- ABC
- Altos
- Aparecidense
- Atlético Cearense
- Botafogo (PB)
- Botafogo (SP)
- Brasil de Pelotas
- Campinense
- Confiança
- Ferroviário
- Figueirense
- Floresta
- Manaus
- Mirassol
- Paysandu
- Remo
- São José (RS)
- Vitória
- Volta Redonda
- Ypiranga (RS)

The Campeonato Brasileiro Série C final was played between ABC and Mirassol.

1 October 2022

ABC	0–0	Mirassol

Frasqueirão, Natal

8 October 2022

Mirassol	2–0	ABC

Estádio Municipal José Maria de Campos Maia, Mirassol

Mirassol won the league after beating ABC.

=== Promotion ===
The four best placed teams, ABC, Vitória, Mirassol and Botafogo (SP), were promoted to the following year's second level.

=== Relegation ===
The four worst placed teams, Campinense, Ferroviário, Atlético Cearense and Brasil de Pelotas, were relegated to the following year's fourth level.

== Campeonato Brasileiro Série D ==
The 2022 Campeonato Brasileiro Série D started on 17 April 2022 and ended on 25 September 2022.

- 4 de Julho
- Ação
- Afogados
- Aimoré
- Amazonas
- América de Natal
- Anápolis
- ASA
- Atlético de Alagoinhas
- Azuriz
- Bahia de Feira
- Brasiliense
- Caldense
- FC Cascavel
- Castanhal
- Caxias
- Ceilândia
- CEOV
- Cianorte
- Costa Rica
- Crato
- CSE
- Ferroviária
- Fluminense (PI)
- Globo
- Grêmio Anápolis
- Humaitá
- Icasa
- Inter de Limeira
- Iporá
- Jacuipense
- Juazeirense
- Juventude Samas
- Juventus
- Lagarto
- Marcílio Dias
- Moto Club
- Náutico (RR)
- Nova Iguaçu
- Nova Venécia
- Oeste
- Pacajus
- Paraná
- Pérolas Negras
- Porto Velho
- Portuguesa (RJ)
- Pouso Alegre
- Próspera
- Real Noroeste
- Retrô
- Rio Branco (AC)
- Santa Cruz
- Santo André
- São Bernardo
- São Luiz
- São Paulo Crystal
- São Raimundo (AM)
- São Raimundo (RR)
- Sergipe
- Sousa
- Tocantinópolis
- Trem
- Tuna Luso
- URT

Salgueiro and Vera Cruz declined to participate in the Série D. They were replaced by Retrô.

The Campeonato Brasileiro Série D final was played between América de Natal and Pouso Alegre.

18 September 2022

América de Natal	2–0	Pouso Alegre

Arena das Dunas, Natal

25 September 2022

Pouso Alegre	1–0	América de Natal

Manduzão, Pouso Alegre

América de Natal won the league after defeating Pouso Alegre.

=== Promotion ===
The four best placed teams, São Bernardo, Pouso Alegre, Amazonas and América de Natal, were promoted to the following year's third level.

== Super cup ==
=== Supercopa do Brasil ===
The 2022 Supercopa do Brasil was played on 20 February 2022 between Atlético Mineiro and Flamengo.

20 February 2022

Atlético Mineiro	2–2	Flamengo
Penalties
	8–7

Arena Pantanal, Cuiabá

Atlético Mineiro won the super cup after defeating Flamengo.

== Domestic cups ==
=== Copa do Brasil ===
The 2022 Copa do Brasil started on 22 February 2022 and ended on 19 October 2022. The Copa do Brasil final was played between Flamengo and Corinthians.

12 October 2022

Corinthians	0–0	Flamengo

Neo Química Arena, São Paulo

19 October 2022

Flamengo	1–1	Corinthians
Penalties
	6–5

Maracanã, Rio de Janeiro

Flamengo won the cup after defeating Corinthians.

=== Copa do Nordeste ===
The competition featured 16 clubs from the Northeastern region. It started on 22 January 2022 and ended on 3 April 2022. The Copa do Nordeste final was played between Fortaleza and Sport.

31 March 2022

Sport	1–1	Fortaleza

Arena Pernambuco, São Lourenço da Mata

3 April 2022

Fortaleza	1–0	Sport

Castelão, Fortaleza

Fortaleza won the cup after defeating Sport.

=== Copa Verde ===
The competition featured 17 clubs from the North and Central-West regions, including one team from Espírito Santo. It started on 25 October 2022 and ended on 19 November 2022. The Copa Verde final was played between Vila Nova and Paysandu.

15 November 2022

Paysandu	0–0	Vila Nova

Estádio da Curuzu, Belém

19 November 2022

Vila Nova	1–1	Paysandu
Penalties
	3–4

Estádio Serra Dourada, Goiânia

Paysandu won the cup after defeating Vila Nova.

== State championship champions ==
State	Champions
(Acre (state)) Acre	Humaitá
Alagoas	CRB
Amapá	Trem
(Amazonas (Brazilian state)) Amazonas	Manaus
Bahia	Atlético de Alagoinhas
Ceará	Fortaleza
(Federal District (Brazil)) Distrito Federal	Brasiliense
Espírito Santo	Real Noroeste
Goiás	Atlético Goianiense
Maranhão	Sampaio Corrêa
Mato Grosso	Cuiabá
Mato Grosso do Sul	Operário
Minas Gerais	Atlético Mineiro
Pará	Remo
Paraíba	Campinense
(Paraná (state)) Paraná	Coritiba
Pernambuco	Náutico
Piauí	Fluminense
(Rio de Janeiro (state)) Rio de Janeiro	Fluminense
Rio Grande do Norte	ABC
Rio Grande do Sul	Grêmio
Rondônia	Real Ariquemes
Roraima	São Raimundo
(Santa Catarina (state)) Santa Catarina	Brusque
(São Paulo (state)) São Paulo	Palmeiras
Sergipe	Sergipe
Tocantins	Tocantinópolis

== State championship second division champions ==
State	Champions
(Acre (state)) Acre	No second division
Alagoas	Coruripe
Amapá	No second division
(Amazonas (Brazilian state)) Amazonas	Rio Negro
Bahia	Itabuna
Ceará	Guarani de Juazeiro
(Federal District (Brazil)) Distrito Federal	Samambaia
Espírito Santo	Atlético Itapemirim
Goiás	Inhumas
Maranhão	Maranhão
Mato Grosso	Mixto
Mato Grosso do Sul	Operário AC
Minas Gerais	Democrata SL
Pará	Cametá
Paraíba	Serra Branca
(Paraná (state)) Paraná	Foz do Iguaçu
Pernambuco	Central
Piauí	Comercial
(Rio de Janeiro (state)) Rio de Janeiro	Volta Redonda
Rio Grande do Norte	Alecrim
Rio Grande do Sul	Esportivo
Rondônia	Vilhenense
Roraima	No second division
(Santa Catarina (state)) Santa Catarina	Criciúma
(São Paulo (state)) São Paulo	Portuguesa
Sergipe	Dorense
Tocantins	Gurupi

== State cup competition champions ==
Competition	Champions
Copa Alagoas	Cruzeiro de Arapiraca
Copa Espírito Santo	Vitória
Copa Fares Lopes	Pacajus
Copa FGF	São Luiz
Copa FMF (MA)	Tuntum
Copa FMF (MT)	Nova Mutum
Copa Paulista	XV de Piracicaba
Copa Rio	Volta Redonda
Copa Santa Catarina	Marcílio Dias

== Youth competition champions ==
Competition	Champions
Campeonato Brasileiro de Aspirantes	Cuiabá
Campeonato Brasileiro Sub-20	Palmeiras
Copa do Brasil Sub-20	Palmeiras
Supercopa do Brasil Sub-20	Palmeiras
Campeonato Brasileiro Sub-17	Palmeiras
Copa do Brasil Sub-17^{(1)}	Palmeiras
Supercopa do Brasil Sub-17	Palmeiras
Copa São Paulo de Futebol Júnior	Palmeiras
Copa 2 de Julho Sub-15	Bahia

^{(1)} The Copa Nacional do Espírito Santo Sub-17, between 2008 and 2012, was named Copa Brasil Sub-17. The similar named Copa do Brasil Sub-17 is organized by the Brazilian Football Confederation and it was first played in 2013.

== Brazilian clubs in international competitions ==
Team	2022 Copa Libertadores	2022 Copa Sudamericana	2022 Recopa Sudamericana	2022 FIFA Club World Cup
América Mineiro	Eliminated in the group stage	N/A	N/A	N/A
Athletico Paranaense	Runners-up lost to (Brazil) Flamengo	N/A	Runners-up lost to (Brazil) Palmeiras	N/A
Atlético Goianiense	N/A	Semi-finals eliminated by (Brazil) São Paulo	N/A	N/A
Atlético Mineiro	Quarter-finals eliminated by (Brazil) Palmeiras	N/A	N/A	N/A
Ceará	N/A	Quarter-finals eliminated by (Brazil) São Paulo	N/A	N/A
Corinthians	Quarter-finals eliminated by (Brazil) Flamengo	N/A	N/A	N/A
Cuiabá	N/A	Eliminated in the group stage	N/A	N/A
Flamengo	Champions defeated (Brazil) Athletico Paranaense	N/A	N/A	Third place defeated (Egypt) Al Ahly
Fluminense	Third Stage eliminated by (Paraguay) Olimpia	Eliminated in the group stage	N/A	N/A
Fortaleza	Round of 16 eliminated by (Argentina) Estudiantes	N/A	N/A	N/A
Internacional	N/A	Quarter-finals eliminated by (Peru) Melgar	N/A	N/A
Palmeiras	Semi-finals eliminated by (Brazil) Athletico Paranaense	N/A	Champions defeated (Brazil) Athletico Paranaense	N/A
Red Bull Bragantino	Eliminated in the group stage	N/A	N/A	N/A
Santos	N/A	Round of 16 eliminated by (Venezuela) Deportivo Táchira	N/A	N/A
São Paulo	N/A	Runners-up lost to (Ecuador) Independiente del Valle	N/A	N/A

== National team ==
The following table lists all the games played by the Brazilian national team in official competitions and friendly matches during 2022.

=== Friendlies ===
2 June	South Korea	1–5	Brazil	Seoul, South Korea
20:00 UTC+9	Hwang Ui-jo 31'	Report	Richarlison 7'; Neymar 42' (pen.), 57' (pen.); Philippe Coutinho 80'; Gabriel Jesus 90+3'	Stadium: Seoul World Cup Stadium; Attendance: 64,872; Referee: Ryuji Sato (Japan)

6 June	Japan	0–1	Brazil	Tokyo, Japan
19:20 UTC+9		Report	Neymar 77' (pen.)	Stadium: Japan National Stadium; Attendance: 63,638; Referee: Alireza Faghani (Iran)

23 September	Brazil	3–0	Ghana	Le Havre, France
20:30 UTC+2	Marquinhos 9'; Richarlison 28', 39'	Report		Stadium: Stade Océane; Referee: Willy Delajod (France)

27 September	Brazil	5–1	Tunisia	Paris, France
20:30 UTC+2	Raphinha 11', 39'; Richarlison 19'; Neymar 28' (pen.); Pedro 74'	Report	Talbi 17'	Stadium: Parc des Princes; Referee: Ruddy Buquet (France)

=== FIFA World Cup qualification ===
27 January	Ecuador	1–1	Brazil	Quito, Ecuador
16:00 UTC−5	Torres 75'	Report	Casemiro 6'	Stadium: Estadio Rodrigo Paz Delgado; Attendance: 17,992; Referee: Wilmar Roldán (Colombia)

1 February	Brazil	4–0	Paraguay	Belo Horizonte, Brazil
21:30 UTC−3	Raphinha 28'; Philippe Coutinho 62'; Antony 86'; Rodrygo 88'	Report		Stadium: Mineirão; Attendance: 32,344; Referee: Facundo Tello (Argentina)

24 March	Brazil	4–0	Chile	Rio de Janeiro, Brazil
20:30 UTC−3	Neymar 44' (pen.); Vinícius Júnior 45+1'; Philippe Coutinho 72' (pen.); Richarlison 90+1'	Report		Stadium: Maracanã; Attendance: 69,368; Referee: Darío Herrera (Argentina)

29 March	Bolivia	0–4	Brazil	La Paz, Bolivia
19:30 UTC−4		Report	Lucas Paquetá 24'; Richarlison 45', 90+1'; Bruno Guimarães 66'	Stadium: Estadio Hernando Siles; Referee: Éber Aquino (Paraguay)

=== FIFA World Cup ===
24 November Group G	Brazil	2–0	Serbia	Lusail, Qatar
22:00 UTC+3	Richarlison 62', 73'	Report		Stadium: Lusail Iconic Stadium; Referee: Alireza Faghani (Iran)

28 November Group G	Brazil	1–0	Switzerland	Doha, Qatar
19:00 UTC+3	Casemiro 83'	Report		Stadium: Stadium 974; Referee: Iván Barton (El Salvador)

2 December Group G	Cameroon	1–0	Brazil	Lusail, Qatar
22:00 UTC+3	Aboubakar 90+2'	Report		Stadium: Lusail Iconic Stadium; Referee: Ismail Elfath (United States)

5 December Round of 16	Brazil	4–1	South Korea	Doha, Qatar
22:00 UTC+3	Vinícius Júnior 7'; Neymar 13' (pen.); Richarlison 29'; Lucas Paquetá 36'	Report	Paik Seung-ho 76'	Stadium: Stadium 974; Referee: Clément Turpin (France)

9 December Quarter-finals	Croatia	1–1 (a.e.t.) (4–2 p)	Brazil	Al Rayyan, Qatar
18:00 UTC+3	Petković 117'	Report	Neymar 105+1'	Stadium: Education City Stadium; Referee: Michael Oliver (England)
	Penalties
	Vlašić (penalty scored); Majer (penalty scored); Modrić (penalty scored); Oršić (penalty scored)		(penalty missed) Rodrygo; (penalty scored) Casemiro; (penalty scored) Pedro; (penalty missed) Marquinhos

Competition	Performance
FIFA World Cup	Quarter-finals eliminated by Croatia

== Women's football ==
=== Campeonato Brasileiro de Futebol Feminino Série A1 ===
The 2022 Campeonato Brasileiro de Futebol Feminino Série A1 started on 4 March 2022 and ended on 24 September 2022.

- Atlético Mineiro
- Avaí/Kindermann
- Corinthians
- CRESSPOM
- Cruzeiro
- ESMAC
- Ferroviária
- Flamengo/Marinha
- Grêmio
- Internacional
- Palmeiras
- Real Brasília
- Red Bull Bragantino
- Santos
- São José
- São Paulo

The Campeonato Brasileiro de Futebol Feminino Série A1 final was played between Corinthians and Internacional.

18 September 2022

Internacional	1–1	Corinthians

Estádio Beira-Rio, Porto Alegre

24 September 2022

Corinthians	4–1	Internacional

Neo Química Arena, São Paulo

Corinthians won the league after defeating Internacional.

==== Relegation ====
The four worst placed teams, CRESSPOM, Red Bull Bragantino, São José and ESMAC, were relegated to the following year's second level.

=== Campeonato Brasileiro de Futebol Feminino Série A2 ===
The 2022 Campeonato Brasileiro de Futebol Feminino Série A2 started on 11 June 2022 and ended on 17 September 2022.

- Aliança/Goiás
- América Mineiro
- Athletico Paranaense
- Bahia
- Botafogo
- Botafogo (PB)
- Ceará
- CEFAMA
- Fluminense
- Fortaleza
- Iranduba
- JC
- Minas/ICESP
- Real Ariquemes
- UDA
- Vasco da Gama

Napoli was disbanded. They were replaced by CEFAMA

The Campeonato Brasileiro de Futebol Feminino Série A2 final was played between Athletico Paranaense and Ceará.

10 September 2022

Athletico Paranaense	2–0	Ceará

Arena da Baixada, Curitiba

17 September 2022

Ceará	2–0	Athletico Paranaense
Penalties
	3–1

Estádio Presidente Vargas, Fortaleza

Ceará won the league after defeating Athletico Paranaense.

==== Promotion ====
The four best placed teams, Bahia, Ceará, Athletico Paranaense and Real Ariquemes, were promoted to the following year's first level.

==== Relegation ====
The four worst placed teams, Vasco da Gama, Iranduba, CEFAMA and Aliança/Goiás, were relegated to the following year's third level.

=== Campeonato Brasileiro de Futebol Feminino Série A3 ===
The 2022 Campeonato Brasileiro de Futebol Feminino Série A3 started on 11 June 2022 and ended on 28 August 2022.

- 3B da Amazônia
- Abelhas Rainhas
- Atlético Goianiense
- Barcelona
- Cabofriense
- Coritiba/Imperial
- CRB
- Criciúma
- Cuiabá
- Doce Mel/Jequié EC
- Estanciano
- Flamengo de São Pedro
- Ipatinga
- Juventude
- Legião
- Menina Olímpica
- Mixto
- Náutico
- Operário
- Paraíso
- Realidade Jovem
- Remo
- Rio Branco (AC)
- São Raimundo (RR)
- Sport
- AD Taubaté
- Toledo
- União/ABC
- VF4
- Vila Nova/UNIVERSO
- Vila Nova (ES)
- Ypiranga (AP)

Teresina declined to participate in the Série A3. They were replaced by Abelhas Rainhas.
Chapecoense qualified for the Série A3 via RNC but declined to participate. They were replaced by Juventude. As the 2021 Campeonato Maranhense Feminino was not played, the Maranhão berth was granted to Vitória via RNC. However they did not confirm their participation before the deadline and were excluded. Finally the berth was granted to Coritiba/Imperial.

The Campeonato Brasileiro de Futebol Feminino Série A3 final was played between AD Taubaté and 3B da Amazônia.

20 August 2022

3B da Amazônia	2–0	AD Taubaté

Estádio Ismael Benigno, Manaus

28 August 2022

AD Taubaté	3–0	3B da Amazônia

Joaquinzão, Taubaté

AD Taubaté won the league after defeating 3B da Amazônia.

==== Promotion ====
The four best placed teams, Sport, 3B da Amazônia, AD Taubaté and Vila Nova/UNIVERSO, were promoted to the following year's second level.

=== Super cup ===
==== Supercopa do Brasil de Futebol Feminino ====
The competition featured 8 clubs chosen between the top-twelve 2021 Série A1 and the top-four 2021 Série A2, with only one team for state. It started on 4 February 2022 and ended on 13 February 2022. The Supercopa do Brasil de Futebol Feminino final was played between Grêmio and Corinthians.

13 February 2022

Corinthians	1–0	Grêmio

Neo Química Arena, São Paulo

Corinthians won the super cup after defeating Grêmio.

=== Domestic competition champions ===
State	Champions
(Acre (state)) Acre	Assermurb
Alagoas	UDA
Amapá	Cancelled
(Amazonas (Brazilian state)) Amazonas	Recanto/Nacional
Bahia	Bahia
Ceará	Fortaleza
(Federal District (Brazil)) Distrito Federal	Real Brasília
Espírito Santo	Vila Nova
Goiás	Aliança/Goiás
Maranhão	IAPE
Mato Grosso	Mixto
Mato Grosso do Sul	Operário
Minas Gerais	Atlético Mineiro
Pará	Remo
Paraíba	VF4
(Paraná (state)) Paraná	Athletico Paranaense
Pernambuco	Sport
Piauí	Tiradentes
(Rio de Janeiro (state)) Rio de Janeiro	Botafogo
Rio Grande do Norte	União/ABC
Rio Grande do Sul	Grêmio
Rondônia	Real Ariquemes
Roraima	São Raimundo
(Santa Catarina (state)) Santa Catarina	Avaí/Kindermann
(São Paulo (state)) São Paulo	Palmeiras
Sergipe	Estanciano
Tocantins	Polivalente

=== State cup competition champions ===
Competition	Champions
Copa Paulista de Futebol Feminino	Corinthians

=== Youth competition champions ===
Competition	Champions
Campeonato Brasileiro de Futebol Feminino Sub-20	Internacional
Campeonato Brasileiro de Futebol Feminino Sub-17	Internacional

=== Brazilian clubs in international competitions ===
Team	2022 Copa Libertadores Femenina
Corinthians	Quarter-finals eliminated by (Argentina) Boca Juniors
Ferroviária	Quarter-finals eliminated by (Colombia) Deportivo Cali
Palmeiras	Champions defeated (Argentina) Boca Juniors

=== National team ===
The following table lists all the games played by the Brazil women's national football team in official competitions and friendly matches during 2022.

The Brazil women's national football team competed in the following competitions in 2022:

==== Friendlies ====
7 April	Spain	1–1	Brazil	Alicante, Spain
20:00 (CEST)	Putellas 7'	Report	Geyse 39'	Stadium: Estadio José Rico Pérez; Attendance: 8,833; Referee: Rebecca Welch (England)

11 April	Brazil	3–1	Hungary	San Pedro del Pinatar, Spain
20:30 (CEST)	Gabi Nunes 13', 60'; Bia Zaneratto 52'	Report	Csiki 74' (pen.)	Stadium: Pinatar Arena; Referee: Ainara Acevedo (Spain)

24 June	Denmark	2–1	Brazil	Copenhagen, Denmark
19:00 (CEST)	Thomsen 16'; Gejl 90'	Report	Debinha 86'	Stadium: Parken Stadium; Attendance: 21,542; Referee: Henrikke Nervik (Norway)

28 June	Sweden	3–1	Brazil	Stockholm, Sweden
18:30 (CEST)	Rytting Kaneryd 65'; Hurtig 67'; Blackstenius 89'	Report	Debinha 50'	Stadium: Friends Arena; Attendance: 33,218; Referee: Sandra Braz (Portugal)

2 September	South Africa	0–3	Brazil	Johannesburg, South Africa
18:00 (SAST)		Report	Geyse 43'; Adriana 45'; Tamires 63'	Stadium: Orlando Stadium; Referee: Maria Rivet (Mauritius)

5 September	South Africa	0–6	Brazil	Durban, South Africa
18:00 (SAST)		Report	Adriana 4'; Debinha 45', 81'; Bia Zaneratto 49' (pen.); Duda 51'; Kathellen 58'	Stadium: Moses Mabhida Stadium; Referee: Tatu Malogo (Tanzania)

7 October	Norway	1–4	Brazil	Oslo, Norway
19:00 (CEST)	Ildhusøy 50'	Report	Adriana 43'; Bia Zaneratto 47', 52'; Jaqueline 73'	Stadium: Ullevaal Stadion; Referee: Lina Lehtovaara (Finland)

10 October	Italy	0–1	Brazil	Genoa, Italy
18:30 (CEST)		Report	Adriana 46'	Stadium: Stadio Luigi Ferraris; Referee: Michèle Schmölzer (Switzerland)

11 November	Brazil	1–2	Canada	Santos, Brazil
15:15 (BRT)	Debinha 32'	Report	Zadorsky 21'; Leon 29'	Stadium: Estádio Urbano Caldeira; Referee: Gabriela Coronel (Argentina)

15 November	Brazil	2–1	Canada	São Paulo, Brazil
15:15 (BRT)	Bia Zaneratto 41'; Ana Vitória 90+1'	Report	Lawrence 60' (pen.)	Stadium: Neo Química Arena; Referee: Laura Fortunato (Argentina)

==== 2022 Tournoi de France ====
16 February	Brazil	1–1	Netherlands	Caen, France
19:00 (CET)	Marta 87' (pen.)	Report	Beerensteyn 62'	Stadium: Stade Michel d'Ornano; Attendance: 1,182; Referee: Stéphanie Frappart (France)

19 February	France	2–1	Brazil	Caen, France
21:10 (CET)	Katoto 23', 59'	Report	Marta 19' (pen.)	Stadium: Stade Michel d'Ornano; Attendance: 12,050; Referee: Esther Staubli (Switzerland)

22 February	Brazil	0–0	Finland	Caen, France
18:30 (CET)		Report		Stadium: Stade Michel d'Ornano; Referee: Victoria Beyer (France)

==== 2022 Copa América Femenina ====
9 July Group B	Brazil	4–0	Argentina	Armenia, Colombia
19:00 (COT)	Adriana 28', 58'; Bia Zaneratto 36' (pen.); Debinha 87'	Report		Stadium: Estadio Centenario; Referee: María Belén Carvajal (Chile)

12 July Group B	Uruguay	0–3	Brazil	Armenia, Colombia
16:00 (COT)		Report	Adriana 32', 48'; Debinha 45+2'	Stadium: Estadio Centenario; Referee: Zulma Quiñónez (Paraguay)

18 July Group B	Venezuela	0–4	Brazil	Armenia, Colombia
16:00 (COT)		Report	Bia Zaneratto 22'; Ary Borges 51'; Debinha 58', 65'	Stadium: Estadio Centenario; Referee: Zulma Quiñónez (Paraguay)

21 July Group B	Brazil	6–0	Peru	Cali, Colombia
19:00 (COT)	Duda 1'; Duda Sampaio 17'; Geyse 41'; Duda Santos 44' (pen.); Fe Palermo 48'; Adriana 50' (pen.)	Report		Stadium: Estadio Olímpico Pascual Guerrero; Referee: Susana Corella (Ecuador)

26 July Semi-finals	Brazil	2–0	Paraguay	Bucaramanga, Colombia
19:00 (COT)	Ary Borges 16'; Bia Zaneratto 28'	Report		Stadium: Estadio Alfonso López; Referee: Anahí Fernández (Uruguay)

30 July Final	Colombia	0–1	Brazil	Bucaramanga, Colombia
19:00 (COT)		Report	Debinha 39' (pen.)	Stadium: Estadio Alfonso López; Referee: Laura Fortunato (Argentina)

Competition	Performance
Tournoi de France	Third place
Copa América Femenina	Champions defeated Colombia
