= Jully (footballer) =

Brazilian footballer (born 1999)

Personal information
- Full name: Jully Luciano da Silva
- Date of birth: 18 April 1999 (age 27)
- Place of birth: Niterói, Brazil
- Height: 1.69 m (5 ft 7 in)
- Position: Goalkeeper

Youth career
- 2013–2015: Vasco da Gama

Senior career*
Years	Team	Apps	(Gls)
2016–2017	Napoli-SC	7	(0)
2018	Chapecoense		
2019–2022	Palmeiras	33	(0)
2023	Santos	2	(0)
2024–	Cruzeiro	0	(0)
- * Club domestic league appearances and goals as of 23:26, 16 April 2024 (UTC) ‡ National team caps and goals as of 16:03, 8 March 2022 (UTC)

Jully Luciano da Silva (born 18 April 1999), simply known as Jully, is a Brazilian professional footballer who plays as a goalkeeper for Cruzeiro.

== Club career ==
Born in Niterói, Rio de Janeiro, Jully began her career at Vasco da Gama's youth setup in 2013, aged 13. In 2017, she moved to Avaí/Kindermann, but played mainly with the reserve team Napoli.

In 2019, Jully signed for Palmeiras. A backup to Vivi Holzel, she became a first-choice in the 2021 season onwards, and won the 2022 Copa Libertadores Femenina as a first-choice.

On 11 January 2023, Jully was announced as the new signing of Santos. Mainly a backup to Camila Rodrigues, she left on 20 December.

== International career ==
Jully was a part of the Brazil under-20 squad in the 2018 FIFA U-20 Women's World Cup, but was only a backup option. She received her first call-up for the full side in February 2022.

== Honours ==
Palmeiras

- Copa Libertadores Femenina: 2022
