= Sassá =

Sassá may refer to:

- Wélissa Gonzaga (born 1982), known as Sassá, Brazilian volleyball player
- Sassá (footballer, born 1988), born Jefferson Gomes de Oliveira, Brazilian football forward
- Sassá (footballer, born 1994), born Luiz Ricardo Alves, Brazilian football forward
- Sassá (footballer, born 2003), born Sabrina Aparecida Galdino Martins, Brazilian football defender

== See also ==
- Sassa, a village in Italy
