= Anna Bia =

Brazilian footballer

Personal information
- Full name: Anna Beatriz Barbosa Ferreira
- Date of birth: 3 August 2000 (age 26)
- Place of birth: São Paulo, Brazil
- Height: 1.76 m (5 ft 9 in)
- Position: Goalkeeper

Team information
- Current team: São Paulo
- Number: 1

Youth career
- 2017: Tiger Academia

Senior career*
Years	Team	Apps	(Gls)
2018–2019	Chapecoense	7	(0)
2019–2021	Bahia	16	(0)
2022–2023	Santos	3	(0)
2024–	São Paulo		
- * Club domestic league appearances and goals as of 15:18, 11 January 2023 (UTC)

Anna Beatriz Barbosa Ferreira (born 3 August 2000), known as Anna Bia, is a Brazilian footballer who plays as a goalkeeper.

== Club career ==
Born in São Paulo, Anna Bia played for the under-17 side of Tiger Academia, before joining Chapecoense for the 2018 season. She left the latter side in the following year, and subsequently moved to Bahia.

On 19 November 2021, Anna Bia left Bahia, and joined Santos the following 3 February. On 19 April 2022, after her debut with the Sereias (a 6–0 win over CRESSPOM), she gave a post-match interview that went viral, after saying that she "liked seeing death stuff".

After spending the 2023 season as a third-choice behind Camila Rodrigues and new signing Jully, Anna Bia left the Sereias on 19 December of that year.

== Honours ==
Bahia

- Campeonato Baiano de Futebol Feminino: 2021

São Paulo

- Supercopa do Brasil: 2025
