= Isabella (footballer) =

Brazilian footballer (born 1999)

Personal information
- Full name: Isabella de Almeida Fernandes
- Date of birth: 18 December 1999 (age 26)
- Place of birth: São Paulo, São Paulo, Brazil
- Height: 1.63 m (5 ft 4 in)
- Position: Right back

Team information
- Current team: Palmeiras

Senior career*
Years	Team	Apps	(Gls)
2017–2018	Ponte Preta	25	(0)
2019–	Palmeiras	5	(2)

International career^{‡}
2016	Brazil U17	3	(0)
2017–2018	Brazil U20	4	(0)
2019–	Brazil	1	(0)
- * Club domestic league appearances and goals as of 15 March 2020 ‡ National team caps and goals as of 15 December 2019

Isabella de Almeida Fernandes (born 18 December 1999), simply known as Isabella, is a Brazilian footballer who plays as a right back for Campeonato Brasileiro de Futebol Feminino Série A1 club SE Palmeiras and the Brazil women's national team.
