= Laura Valverde =

Brazilian footballer (born 2003)

Personal information
- Full name: Laura Valverde Moreira
- Date of birth: 2 June 2003 (age 23)
- Place of birth: Angra dos Reis, Brazil
- Height: 1.68 m (5 ft 6 in)
- Position: Midfielder

Team information
- Current team: Red Bull Bragantino

Youth career
- Santos

Senior career*
Years	Team	Apps	(Gls)
2020–2024	Santos	26	(0)
2025–	Red Bull Bragantino	0	(0)

International career^{‡}
2022	Brazil U20	5	(0)
- * Club domestic league appearances and goals as of 20:57, 19 December 2024 (UTC) ‡ National team caps and goals as of 04:07, 11 August 2022 (UTC)

Laura Valverde Moreira (born 2 June 2003), known as Laura Valverde, is a Brazilian footballer who plays as a midfielder for Red Bull Bragantino.

== Club career ==
Born in Angra dos Reis, Rio de Janeiro, Valverde was a Santos youth graduate. She made her first team debut on 27 September 2020, coming on as a late substitute for Luaninha in a 6–0 Campeonato Brasileiro Série A1 home routing of Ponte Preta.

Laura scored her first senior goal on 18 August 2021, netting his team's second in a 4–0 home success over Nacional-SP, for the Campeonato Paulista championship. On 10 December, she renewed her contract with the club.

On 17 January 2025, Valverde was announced at Red Bull Bragantino.

== Honours ==
Santos

- Copa Paulista de Futebol Feminino: 2020, 2024

=== International ===
Brazil U20

- South American Under-20 Women's Football Championship: 2022
