= Jane Tavares =

Brazilian footballer

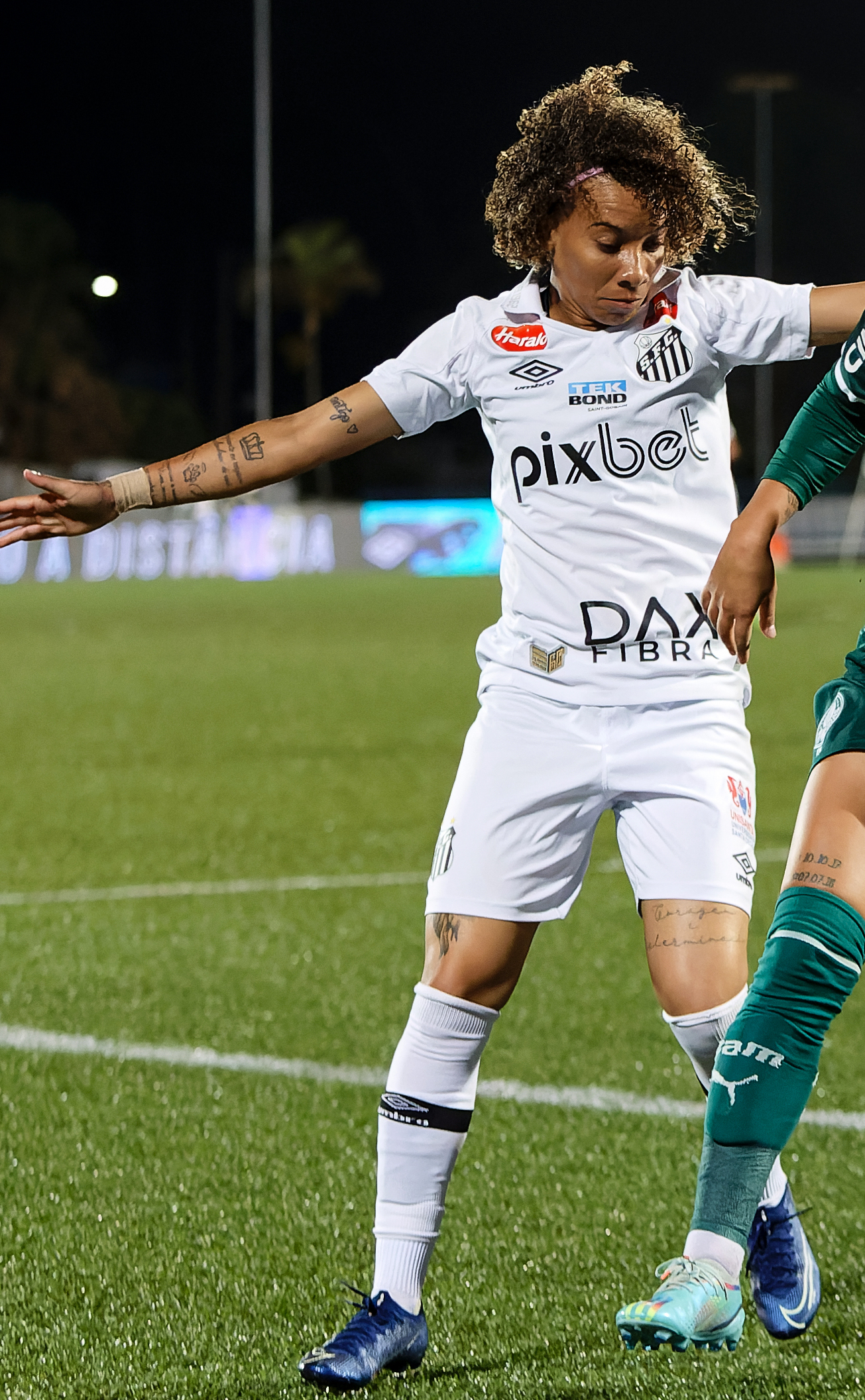
- Jane with Santos in 2022

Personal information
- Full name: Jane Tavares de Oliveira
- Date of birth: 17 November 1992 (age 33)
- Place of birth: Vassouras, Brazil
- Position: Forward

Team information
- Current team: Red Bull Bragantino

Youth career
- Vasco da Gama

Senior career*
Years	Team	Apps	(Gls)
2013–2014	Vasco da Gama	3	(0)
2014	Botafogo	4	(1)
2015–2018	Flamengo	39	(6)
2019	CRESSPOM		
2019	3B da Amazônia		
2019	Atlético Mineiro		
2020–2021	Grêmio	32	(3)
2022–2023	Santos	28	(1)
2024–	Red Bull Bragantino	4	(0)
- * Club domestic league appearances and goals as of 20:13, 14 April 2024 (UTC)

Jane Tavares de Oliveira (born 17 November 1993), known as Jane Tavares or just Jane, is a Brazilian footballer who plays as a forward for Red Bull Bragantino.

== Club career ==
=== Vasco da Gama ===
Jane was born in Vassouras, Rio de Janeiro, and began her career with Vasco da Gama in 2013. She made her league debut against São José EC on 25 September 2013.

=== Botafogo ===
Jane subsequently played for Botafogo in the following year. She made her league debut against Portuguesa de Desportos on 11 September 2014. Jane scored her first league goal against Centro Olímpico on 24 September 2014, scoring in the 66th minute.

=== Flamengo ===
Jane joined Flamengo ahead of the 2015 season. She made her league debut against Portuguesa de Desportos on 13 September 2015. Jane scored her first league goal against Duque de Caxias on 17 September 2015, scoring in the 83rd minute.

=== CRESSPOM, 3B da Amazônia and Atlético Mineiro ===
Jane left Flamengo in the end of 2018, and represented CRESSPOM, 3B da Amazônia and Atlético Mineiro during the 2019 campaign.

=== Grêmio ===
On 20 January 2020, she moved to Grêmio. Jane made her league debut against AS Minas ICESP on 8 February 2020. She scored her first league goal against São José EC on 10 October 2020, scoring in the 55th minute.

Jane renewed with Grêmio for one further year on 15 January 2021, but left the club at the end of the season.

=== Santos ===
On 3 February 2022, she was announced at Santos. Jane made her league debut against Real Brasília on 6 March 2022. She scored her first league goal against ESMAC on 5 June 2022, scoring in the 78th minute.

On 22 November 2022, Jane renewed her contract with Santos for a further season.

=== RB Bragantino ===
Jane made her league debut against Avaí on 16 March 2024.
