= Giovanna Oliveira (footballer) =

Brazilian footballer (born 1992)

Personal information
- Full name: Giovanna de Oliveira
- Date of birth: 28 August 1992 (age 34)
- Place of birth: São Paulo, Brazil
- Height: 1.65 m (5 ft 5 in)
- Positions: Full back; midfielder

Team information
- Current team: Changchun Yatai

Youth career
- Centro Olímpico

Senior career*
Years	Team	Apps	(Gls)
2011	Centro Olímpico		
2011	→ Santos (loan)		
2012	São José		
2013	Centro Olímpico	7	(0)
2013	São Caetano		
2014	Portuguesa	4	(2)
2014	Ferencváros	7	(8)
2015–2016	Portuguesa	3	(0)
2016	Gumi Sportstoto		
2017	3B da Amazônia	0	(0)
2017	Gumi Sportstoto		
2018	Changchun Zhuoyue		
2019	Avaldsnes	16	(9)
2020	Santos	14	(0)
2021	Avaldsnes IL	10	(3)
2022	Santos	13	(0)
2023–	Changchun Yatai	0	(0)

International career^{‡}
2010–2012	Brazil U20	3	(1)
2019	Brazil	2	(0)
- * Club domestic league appearances and goals as of 01:31, 11 January 2023 (UTC) ‡ National team caps and goals as of 15 December 2019

Giovanna de Oliveira (born 28 August 1992), usually known as Giovanna Oliveira and sometimes simply as Giovanna, is a Brazilian footballer who plays as either a full back or a midfielder for Chinese club Changchun Yatai.

== International career ==
Giovanna represented Brazil at the 2012 FIFA U-20 Women's World Cup. She made her senior debut in 2019.

== Honours ==
Centro Olímpico

- Campeonato Brasileiro de Futebol Feminino: 2013

Ferencváros

- Női NB I Third Place: 2014
