= Byanca Brasil =

Brazilian footballer (born 1995)

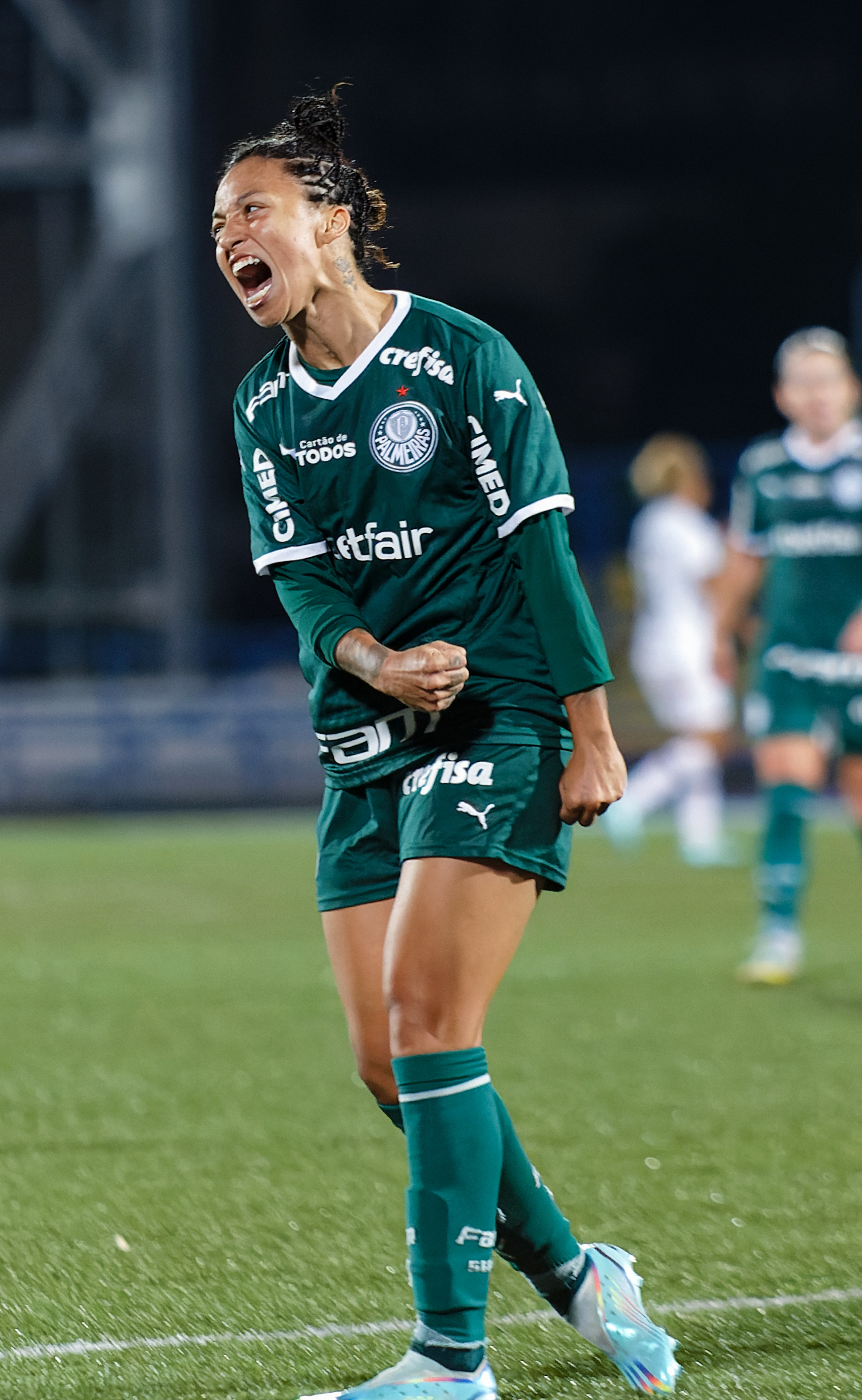
- Byanca playing for Palmeiras in 2022

Personal information
- Full name: Byanca Beatriz Alves de Araújo
- Date of birth: 23 November 1995 (age 30)
- Place of birth: Rio de Janeiro, Brazil
- Height: 1.70 m (5 ft 7 in)
- Position: Forward

Team information
- Current team: Cruzeiro

Youth career
- 2008: Bangu
- 2009: Flamengo
- 2010: Vasco da Gama
- 2010: America-RJ
- 2011: Bangu
- 2011–2012: Vasco da Gama
- 2013: Botafogo

Senior career*
Years	Team	Apps	(Gls)
2013–2014	Foz Cataratas	14	(9)
2014	Vitória das Tabocas		
2015	Kindermann		
2015	Audax		
2015–2016	Centro Olímpico	11	(7)
2016	Corinthians	9	(7)
2016	Audax		
2017	Corinthians	18	(15)
2017	→ Internacional (loan)		
2018–2019	Wuhan Jianghan University		(16)
2020	Internacional	16	(10)
2021	Santos	13	(0)
2022	Palmeiras	18	(6)
2023–	Cruzeiro	0	(0)

International career
2012	Brazil U17	?	(10)
2014	Brazil U20	?	(1)
2024–	Brazil	0	(0)
- * Club domestic league appearances and goals as of 13:28, 2 February 2023 (UTC)

Byanca Beatriz Alves de Araújo (born 23 November 1995), known as Byanca Brasil or simply Byanca, is a Brazilian footballer who plays as a forward for Cruzeiro.

== Club career ==
Byanca was born in Rio de Janeiro, and represented hometown sides Bangu, Flamengo, Vasco da Gama, America-RJ and Botafogo as a youth. She made her senior debut at the age of 17 with Foz Cataratas, being the team's top goalscorer in the 2013 Campeonato Brasileiro de Futebol Feminino Série A1 with 8 goals.

Byanca moved to Vitória das Tabocas for the 2014 Copa Libertadores Femenina, where she scored once in a 1–3 loss to Cerro Porteño. Subsequently, she rarely settled for a club, representing Kindermann, Audax (two stints), Centro Olímpico, Corinthians (two stints) and Internacional.

On 5 February 2018, Byanca signed a two-year contract with Chinese club Wuhan Jianghan University. She returned to Brazil on 24 December 2019, and joined Internacional.

On 8 February 2021, Byanca Brasil was presented at Santos. On 10 December, it was announced that she would leave the club after not renewing her contract.

In January 2022, Byanca Brasil joined Palmeiras.

== International career ==
Byanca represented Brazil at under-17 and under-20 levels, and played in the 2012 South American U-17 Women's Championship, 2012 FIFA U-17 Women's World Cup and 2014 FIFA U-20 Women's World Cup.

== Honours ==
Audax

- Copa do Brasil de Futebol Feminino: 2016

Corinthians

- Copa Libertadores Femenina: 2017

Internacional

- Campeonato Gaúcho de Futebol Feminino: 2017, 2020

Palmeiras

- Copa Libertadores Femenina: 2022
- Campeonato Paulista de Futebol Feminino: 2022
