= Sassá (footballer, born 2003) =

Brazilian footballer

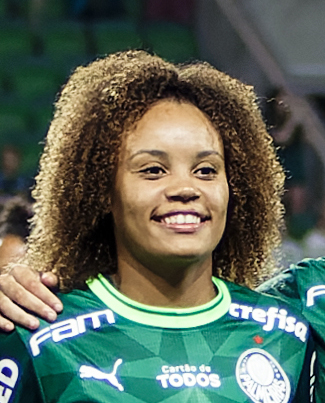
- Sassá with Palmeiras in 2023

Personal information
- Full name: Sabrina Aparecida Galdino Martins
- Date of birth: 11 February 2003 (age 23)
- Place of birth: São Paulo, Brazil
- Height: 1.68 m (5 ft 6 in)
- Position: Centre back

Team information
- Current team: Grêmio

Youth career
- 2018–2020: Santos

Senior career*
Years	Team	Apps	(Gls)
2020–2022	Santos	4	(0)
2023	Palmeiras	3	(0)
2024–	Grêmio	0	(0)

International career
2022	Brazil U20	1	(0)
- * Club domestic league appearances and goals as of 02:33, 13 November 2023 (UTC)

Sabrina Aparecida Galdino Martins (born 11 February 2003), commonly known as Sassá, is a Brazilian footballer who plays as a central defender for Grêmio. She has also represented Brazil at the under-20 level.

== Club career ==
Born in São Paulo, Sassá joined Santos' youth setup in 2018 through a social project. Promoted to the main squad in September 2020, she made her senior debut on 11 October of that year, starting in a 1–0 Campeonato Brasileiro Série A1 home win over Vitória.

On 23 January 2021, Sassá signed her first professional contract with Santos. On 28 December 2022, she left the club after her contract was due to expire.

On 19 January 2023, Sassá joining Palmeiras was announced .

== Honours ==
Santos

- Copa Paulista de Futebol Feminino: 2020
