= Duda Santos =

Brazilian footballer (born 1996)

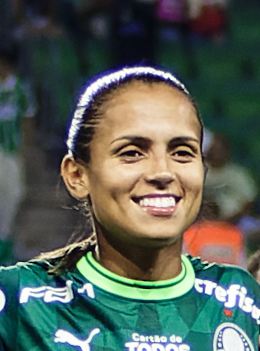
- Duda playing for Palmeiras

Personal information
- Full name: Adailma Aparecida da Silva dos Santos
- Date of birth: 24 March 1996 (age 30)
- Place of birth: Major Isidoro, Brazil
- Height: 1.70 m (5 ft 7 in)
- Position: Midfielder

Team information
- Current team: Palmeiras
- Number: 7

Senior career*
Years	Team	Apps	(Gls)
2014–2016	Chapecoense		
2017	Avaí/Kindermann	15	(0)
2017–2018	Kiryat Gat	24	(12)
2018–2020	Avaí/Kindermann	49	(11)
2021–	Palmeiras	34	(10)

International career^{‡}
2016	Brazil U20	4	(1)
2020–	Brazil	6	(2)
- * Club domestic league appearances and goals as of 03:51, 11 July 2022 (UTC) ‡ National team caps and goals as of 01:20, 14 August 2022 (UTC)

Adailma Aparecida da Silva dos Santos (born 24 March 1996), known as Duda Santos or just Duda, is a Brazilian professional footballer who plays as a midfielder for Palmeiras.

== Club career ==
Born in Major Isidoro, Alagoas, Duda played futsal and made her senior debut in football with Chapecoense in 2014. In 2017, after a short period at Kindermann/Avaí, she moved abroad with Israeli club Kiryat Gat.

Duda returned to Brazil and Avaí in 2018, being a regular starter until rescinding her contract in January 2021. Late in the month, she joined Palmeiras.

In 2022, Santos was part of the Palmeiras squad that won both the São Paulo Women's State Championship and the Copa Libertadores Femenina.

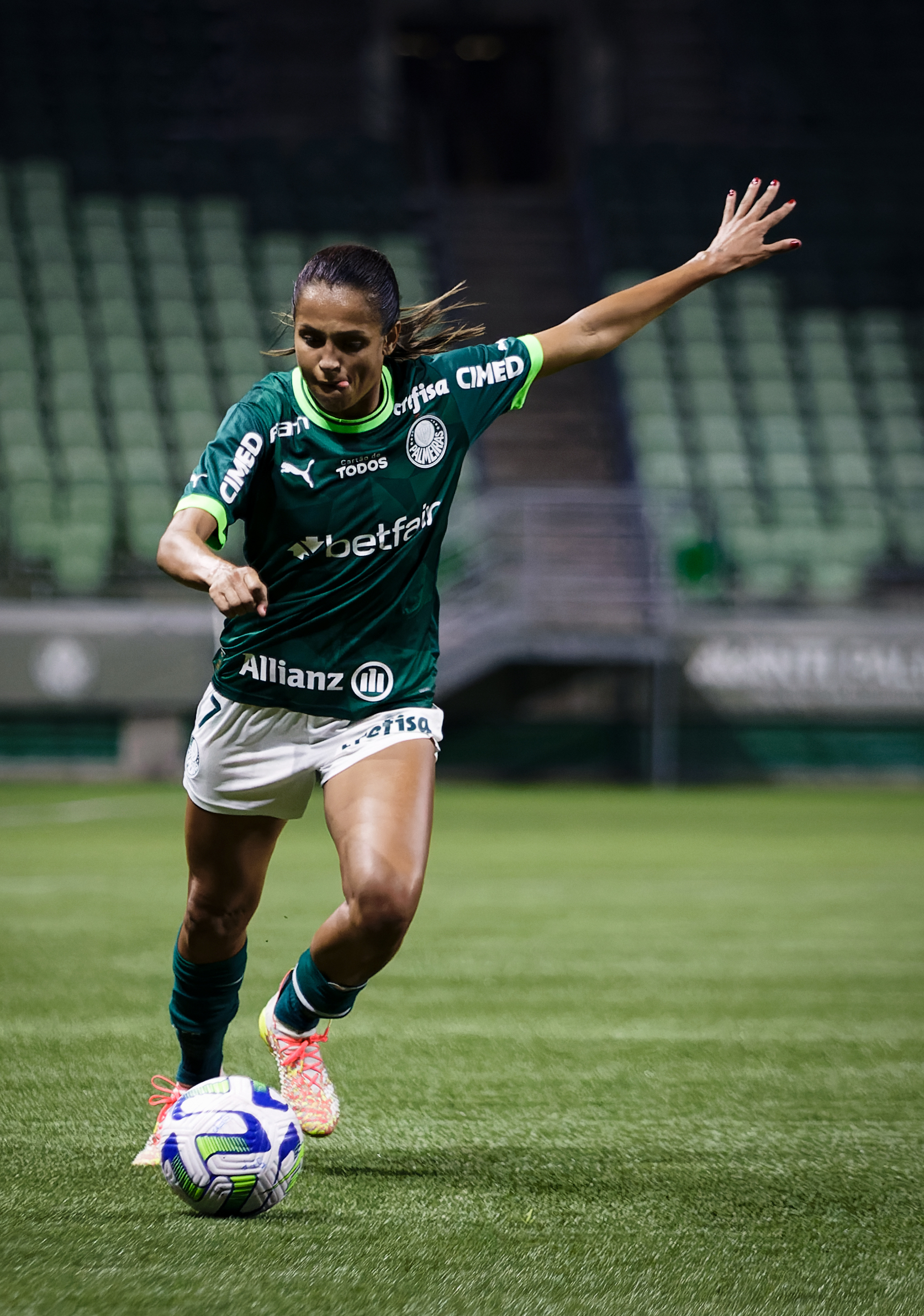
Duda Santos playing for Palmeiras in 2023

At the beginning of 2024, she was announced as a new signing for Ferroviária for the season.

She stayed the whole 2024 and 2025 seasons with Ferroviária and then, in January 2026, she was announced as a Palmeiras player once again.

== International career ==
After representing Brazil at under-20 level, Duda received her first call up for the full side on 9 November 2020, for friendlies against Argentina. She made her international debut on 27 November of that year, coming on as a second-half substitute for Adriana and scoring the side's sixth in a 6–0 win over Ecuador at the Arena Corinthians.

== Career statistics ==
=== International ===
As of 10 July 2022

Brazil
Year	Apps	Goals
2020	1	1
2022	3	0
Total	4	1

=== International goals ===
Goal	Date	Location	Opponent	Score	Result	Competition
1	2020-11-27	São Paulo, Brazil	Ecuador	6–0	6–0	Friendly game
2	2022-07-21	Cali, Colombia	Peru	4–0	6–0	Copa América 2022
3	2024-02-24	San Diego, United States	Colombia	0–1	0–1	2024 CONCACAF W Gold Cup

== Honours ==
Palmeiras

- Copa Paulista: 2021
- Copa Libertadores Femenina: 2022
- Campeonato Paulista de Futebol Feminino: 2022
- Supercopa do Brasil de Futebol Feminino: 2026
