= Ana Carla (footballer) =

Brazilian footballer

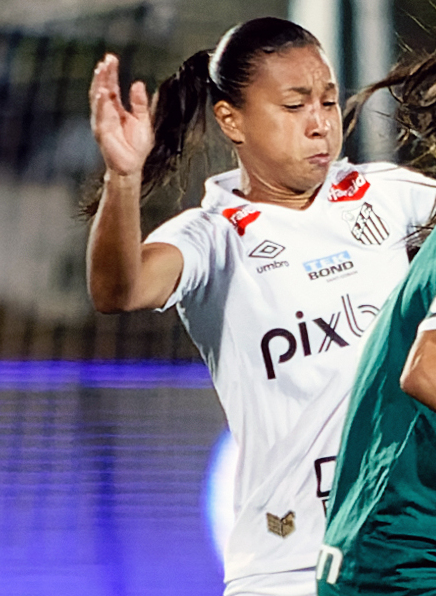
- Ana Carla with Santos in 2022

Personal information
- Full name: Ana Carla de Oliveira Barboza
- Date of birth: 25 June 1994 (age 32)
- Place of birth: Vitória, Brazil
- Position: Midfielder

Team information
- Current team: Red Bull Bragantino

Senior career*
Years	Team	Apps	(Gls)
2013	Castelo		
2014	Comercial-ES		
2015–2021	Flamengo	54	(7)
2022–2024	Santos	28	(4)
2025–	Red Bull Bragantino	0	(0)
- * Club domestic league appearances and goals as of 21:03, 19 December 2024 (UTC)

Ana Carla de Oliveira Barboza (born 25 June 1994), known as Ana Carla, is a Brazilian footballer who plays as a midfielder for Red Bull Bragantino.

== Club career ==
Born in Vitória, Espírito Santo, Ana Carla played basketball for the most of her youth, joining the team of Osasco/Bradesco in 2011. After nearly becoming a professional at the club, she returned to her native state to pursue a football career, and made her senior debut with local side Castelo in 2013.

In 2015, after spending a period at Boavista (as the club turned down the creation of a women's side due to financial problems) and playing for a local side in Matão, Ana Carla joined Flamengo. During her seven-season spell at the club, she was never a regular starter, and the club announced her departure on 11 January 2022.

On 3 February 2022, Ana Carla was announced at Santos. On 22 November, after being a regular starter, she renewed her contract for a further year.

Ana Carla spent a part of the 2024 season nursing an injury, and moved to Red Bull Bragantino on 17 January 2025.

== Honours ==
Flamengo

- Campeonato Carioca de Futebol Feminino: 2019

Santos

- Copa Paulista de Futebol Feminino: 2024
