= Vivi Holzel =

Brazilian footballer

Personal information
- Full name: Viviane Holzel Domingues
- Date of birth: 15 September 1989 (age 37)
- Place of birth: São Paulo, Brazil
- Height: 1.69 m (5 ft 7 in)
- Position: Goalkeeper

Team information
- Current team: Flamengo
- Number: 17

Senior career*
Years	Team	Apps	(Gls)
2008–2009	Corinthians		
2010	Foz Cataratas		
2011–2013	Centro Olímpico		
2013	São Caetano		
2014–2015	Avaldsnes	25	(0)
2016	São José	10	(0)
2017	Audax	15	(0)
2017–2018	Grindavík	25	(0)
2018	Audax	0	(0)
2019–2020	Palmeiras	17	(0)
2021	Internacional	19	(0)
2022	Santos	13	(0)
2023–2024	Grêmio	27	(0)
2025–	Flamengo	16	(0)

International career
2008	Brazil U20		
- * Club domestic league appearances and goals as of 21:47, 14 January 2026 (UTC)

Viviane "Vivi" Holzel Domingues (born 15 September 1989) is a Brazilian footballer who plays as a goalkeeper for Flamengo.

== Career ==
Born in São Paulo, Vivi began her career with hometown side Corinthians in 2008. She subsequently played for Foz Cataratas, Centro Olímpico and São Caetano before moving abroad for the 2014 season, with Norwegian side Avaldsnes IL.

Vivi returned to Brazil in 2016 with São José, and represented Audax before moving to Icelandic side Grindavík in 2017. She returned to Audax in 2018, and signed for Palmeiras ahead of the 2019 season.

On 6 February 2021, Vivi was announced as the new signing of Internacional. Roughly one year later, she was presented at Santos.

== Honours ==
Foz Cataratas

- Campeonato Paranaense de Futebol Feminino: 2010

Internacional

- Campeonato Gaúcho de Futebol Feminino: 2021
