= Ary Borges =

Brazilian footballer (born 1999)

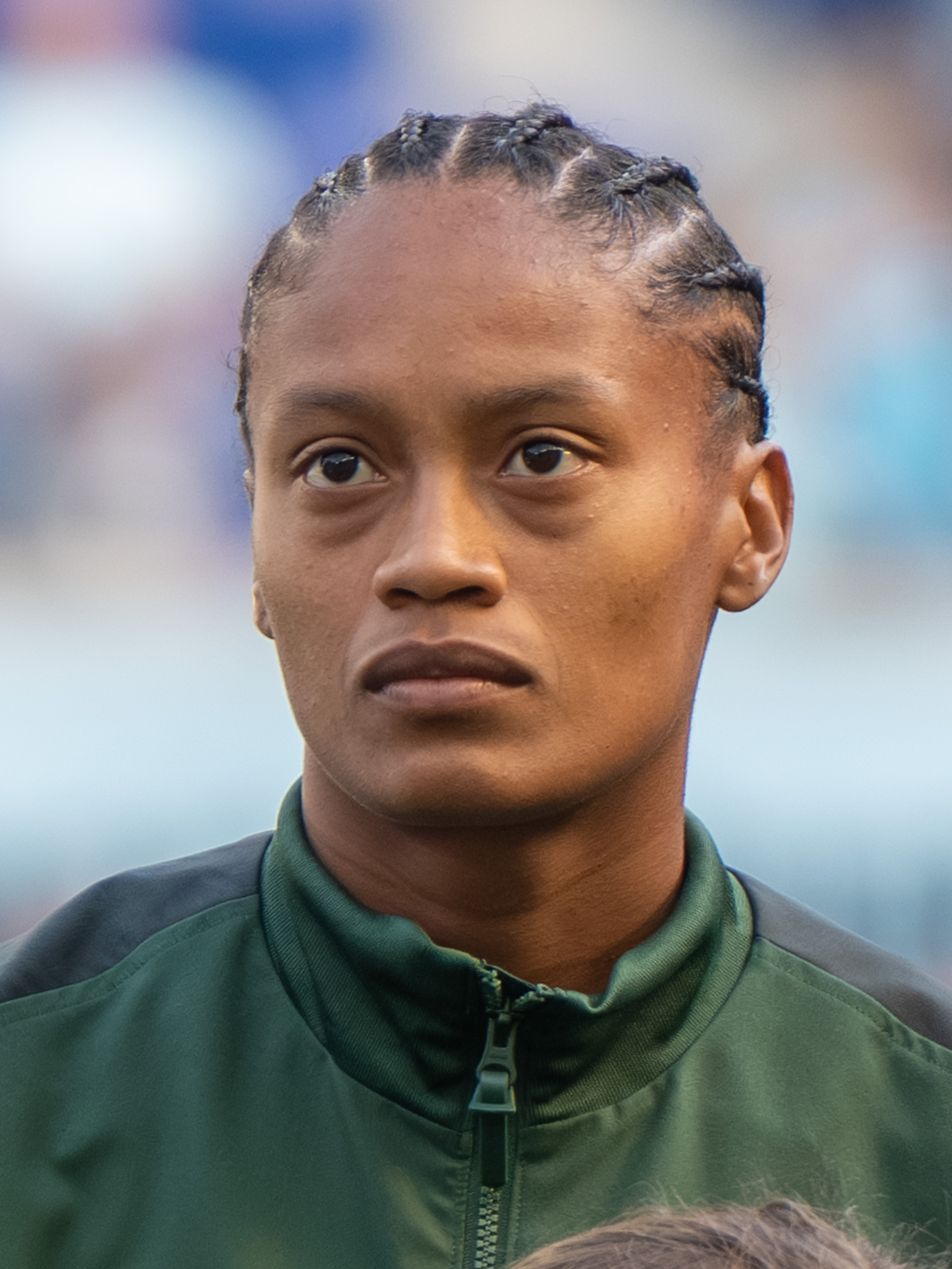
- Borges with Racing Louisville in 2025

Personal information
- Full name: Ariadina Alves Borges
- Date of birth: 28 December 1999 (age 26)
- Place of birth: São Luís, Maranhão, Brazil
- Height: 1.65 m (5 ft 5 in)
- Positions: Midfielder; forward

Team information
- Current team: Angel City
- Number: 8

Youth career
- Santos
- Centro Olímpico

Senior career*
| Years | Team | Apps | (Gls) |
| 2017–2018 | Sport Recife | 20 | (2) |
| 2019 | São Paulo | 11 | (2) |
| 2020–2022 | Palmeiras | 32 | (5) |
| 2023–2025 | Racing Louisville | 53 | (3) |
| 2026– | Angel City | 27 | (3) |

International career^{‡}
| 2020– | Brazil | 30 | (10) |
Medal record
Women's football
Representing Brazil
Copa América Femenina
| Gold medal – first place | 2025 Ecuador |
- * Club domestic league appearances and goals as of 05:58, 12 November 2026 (UTC) ‡ National team caps and goals as of 24 July 2023

Ariadina Alves Borges (born 28 December 1999), known simply as Ary Borges, is a Brazilian professional footballer who plays as a midfielder for Angel City FC of the National Women's Soccer League (NWSL) and the Brazil women's national team.

== Club career ==
Ary Borges was born in São Luís, Maranhão but moved to São Paulo when she was ten years old. There she joined the youth team of Santos FC and was one of three girls who played alongside the boys. Her father signed a waiver indemnifying the club against legal action if she was injured in boys' football. At 11 years old she switched to Centro Olímpico and played in the girls' under-15 team, since there was no under-13s.

In 2017 and 2018 Ary Borges returned to her native Northeast Region to play two seasons of professional football with Sport Recife, before joining the newly re-formed São Paulo for 2019. She was an important player in the team promoted to the Campeonato Brasileiro de Futebol Feminino Série A1 and played up her credentials as a supporter of the club on social media, even staging a São Paulo FC-themed birthday party. The club was disappointed when she left after one year, for a better contract with rivals Palmeiras.

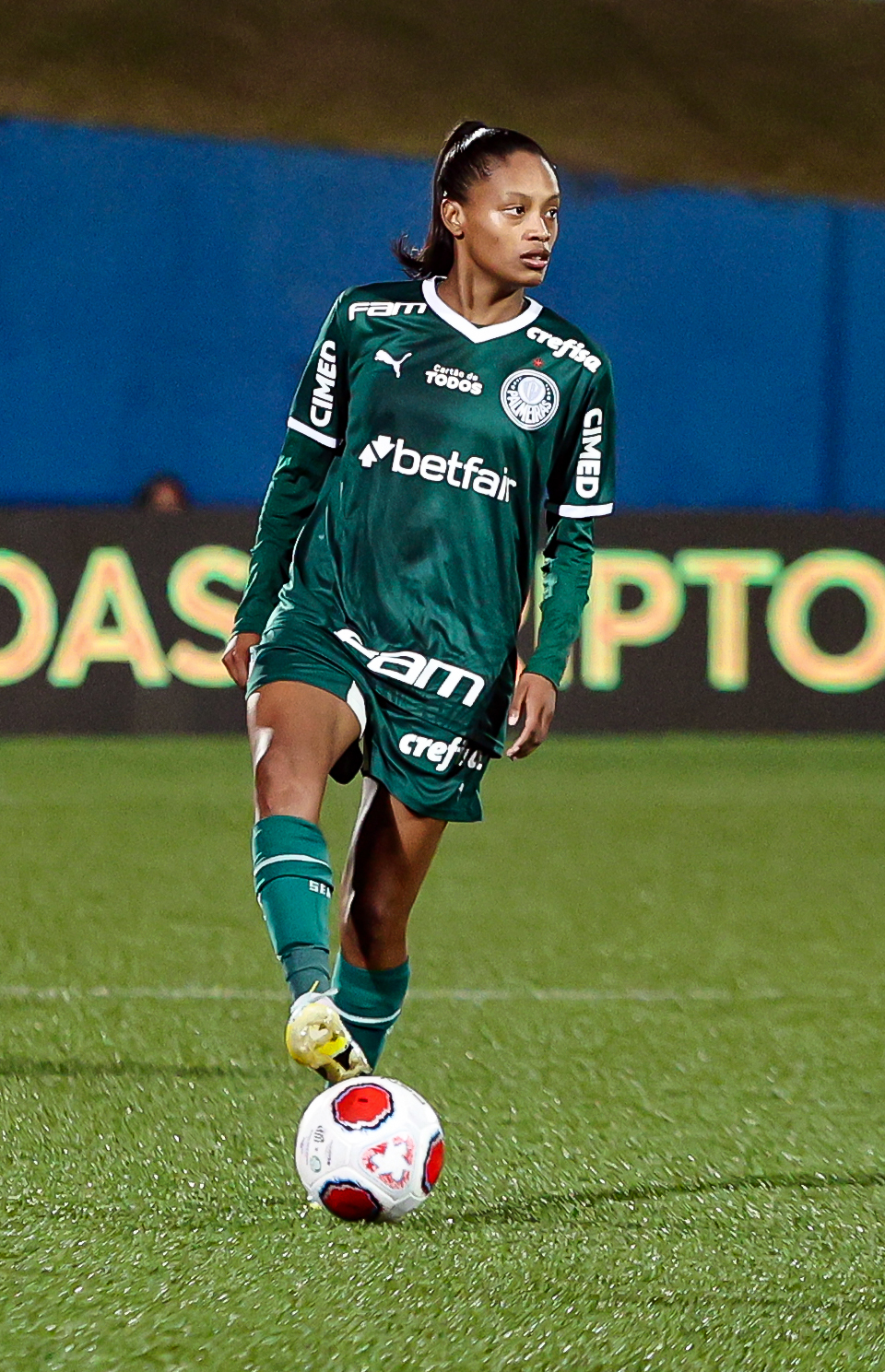
Borges playing with Palmeiras in December 2022

In December 2022, after winning the Campeonato Paulista de Futebol Feminino with Palmeiras, Borges signed with American club Racing Louisville FC.

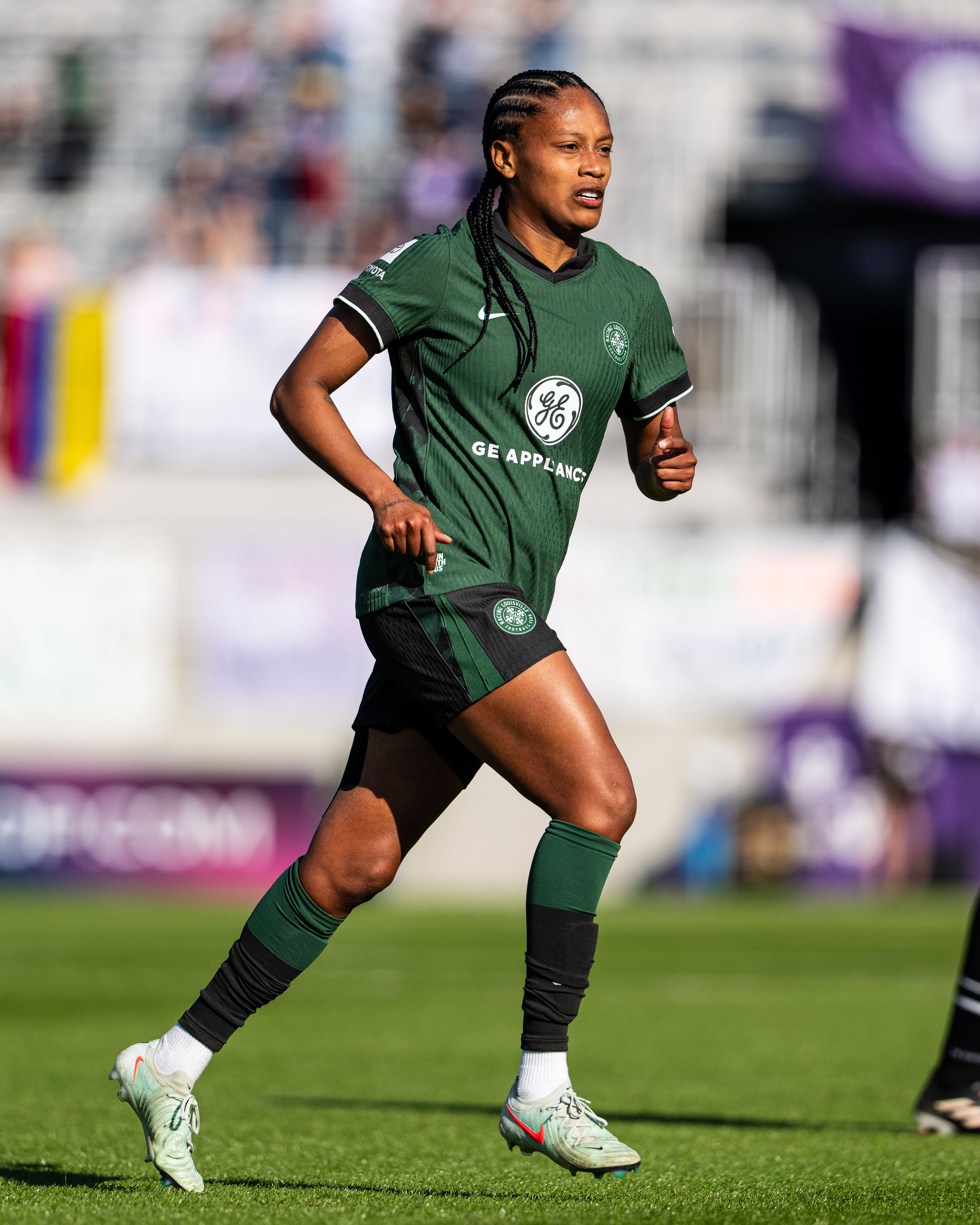
Borges playing with Racing Louisville FC in 2025

In December 2025 it was announced that she would no longer play for Racing Louisville.

She spent three seasons with Racing Louisville FC, racking up 53 regular season appearances and 3 goals, before departing at the end of 2025.

On 6 January 2026, it was announced that Borges had signed a three-year contract with fellow NWSL side Angel City FC.

== International career ==
She featured for the Brazil national under-20 team at the 2018 South American U-20 Women's Championship and subsequent 2018 edition of the U-20 World Cup.

She received her first call-up to the senior Brazil national team in September 2020, selected by coach Pia Sundhage for a training camp at Nova Granja Comary which was restricted to home-based players due to the COVID-19 pandemic in Brazil. She won her first senior cap as a 63rd-minute substitute for Debinha in a 3–1 friendly win over Argentina at Amigão, Campina Grande, Paraíba on 17 September 2021. Another substitute appearance against the same opponents followed three days later, and she maintained her place in the squad for the next friendly fixtures against Australia in Sydney the following month. She scored her first two goals in a 6–1 win over India at the 2021 International Women's Football Tournament of Manaus, a match notable as the farewell appearance of Formiga.

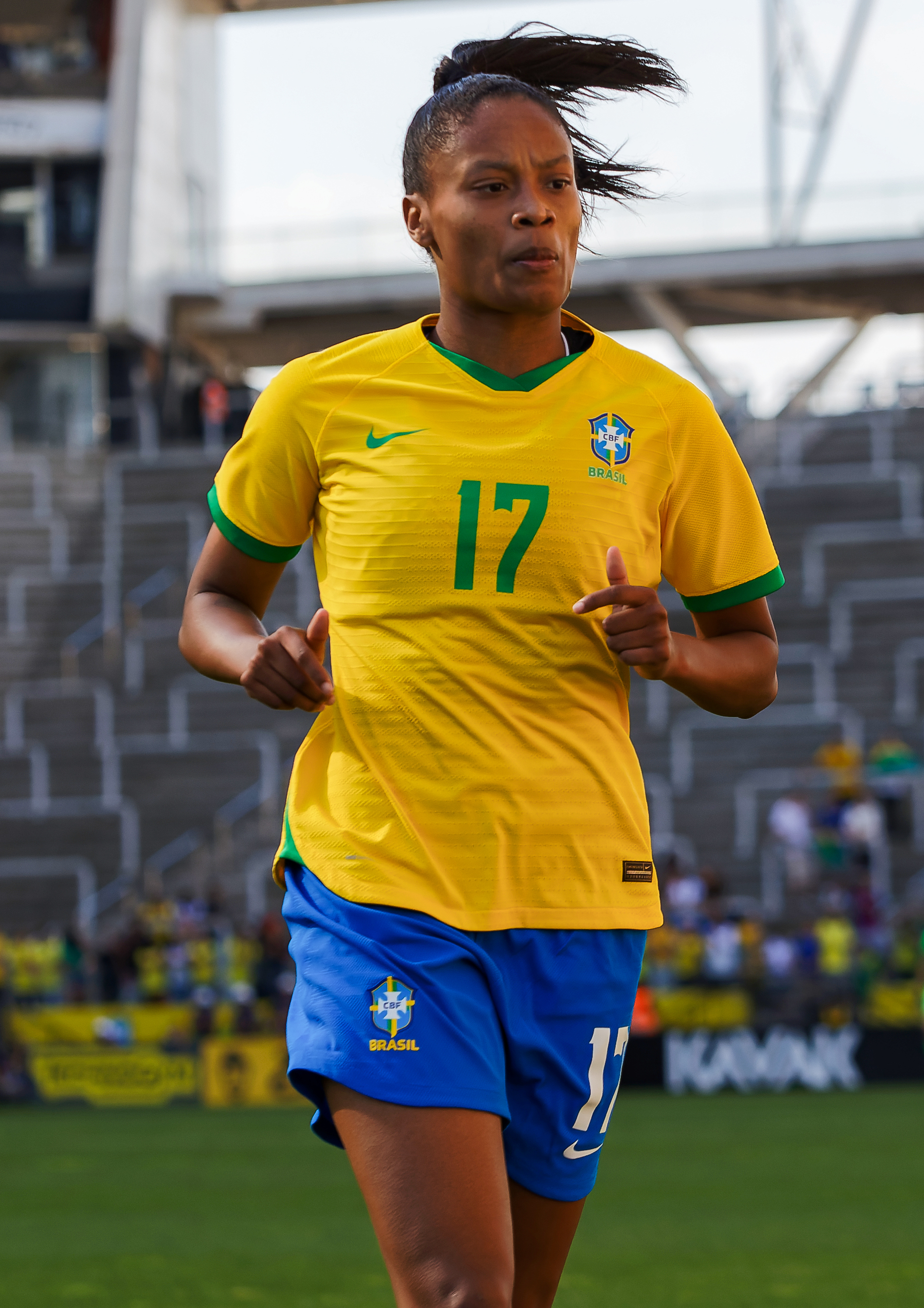
Borges with the Brazil national team in 2022

In 2022, Borges was part of the squad of the Brazil women's national football team that won the Copa América Femenina in Colombia, scoring two goals throughout that campaign.

On 24 July 2023, Borges made her World Cup debut for Brazil in their opening game against Panama, scoring a hat-trick, the first of the World Cup, and providing an assist for the third goal of the game as Brazil cruised to a 4–0 win. She was named Player of the Match after the game in recognition of her exceptional performance for her side.

In 2024, Borges went through a knee surgery and had played only three games by June, which ultimately played a role in her not being called to defend Brazil in the 2024 Summer Olympics.

In 2025, Borges was part of the squad of the Brazil women's national football team that won the Copa América Femenina in Ecuador.

During that competition, she criticized the way Conmebol organized it and asked for better conditions, specially on the situation that the teams were not being permitted to warm up on the pitches before the matches.

== Career statistics ==
=== International goals ===
Scores and results list Brazil's goal tally first.

Table key
| Indicates won the match |
| Indicates Brazil lost the match |

| No. | Date | Venue | Opponent | Score | Result | Competition |
|---|---|---|---|---|---|---|
| 1 | 26 November 2021 | Arena da Amazônia, Manaus, Brazil | India | 3–1 | 6–1 | 2021 International Women's Football Tournament of Manaus |
| 2 | 26 November 2021 | Arena da Amazônia, Manaus, Brazil | India | 6–1 | 6–1 | 2021 International Women's Football Tournament of Manaus |
| 3 | 18 July 2022 | Estadio Centenario, Armenia, Colombia | Venezuela | 2–0 | 4–0 | 2022 Copa América Femenina |
| 4 | 26 July 2022 | Estadio Alfonso López, Bucaramanga, Colombia | Paraguay | 1–0 | 2–0 | 2022 Copa América Femenina |
| 5 | 11 April 2023 | Max-Morlock-Stadion, Nuremberg, Germany | Germany | 2–0 | 2–1 | Friendly |
| 6 | 24 July 2023 | Hindmarsh Stadium, Adelaide, Australia | Panama | 1–0 | 4–0 | 2023 FIFA Women's World Cup |
| 7 | 24 July 2023 | Hindmarsh Stadium, Adelaide, Australia | Panama | 2–0 | 4–0 | 2023 FIFA Women's World Cup |
| 8 | 24 July 2023 | Hindmarsh Stadium, Adelaide, Australia | Panama | 4–0 | 4–0 | 2023 FIFA Women's World Cup |
| 9 | 12 April 2026 | Arena Pantanal, Cuiabá, Brazil | South Korea | 1–0 | 5–1 | 2026 FIFA Series |

== Honours ==
São Paulo

- Brasileirão Feminino A2: 2019

Palmeiras

- Copa Paulista: 2021
- Copa Libertadores da América: 2022
- Campeonato Paulista de Futebol Feminino: 2022

Seleção Brasileira

- Copa América: 2022
- Copa América: 2025
