= Camila Rodrigues (footballer) =

Brazilian footballer (born 2001)

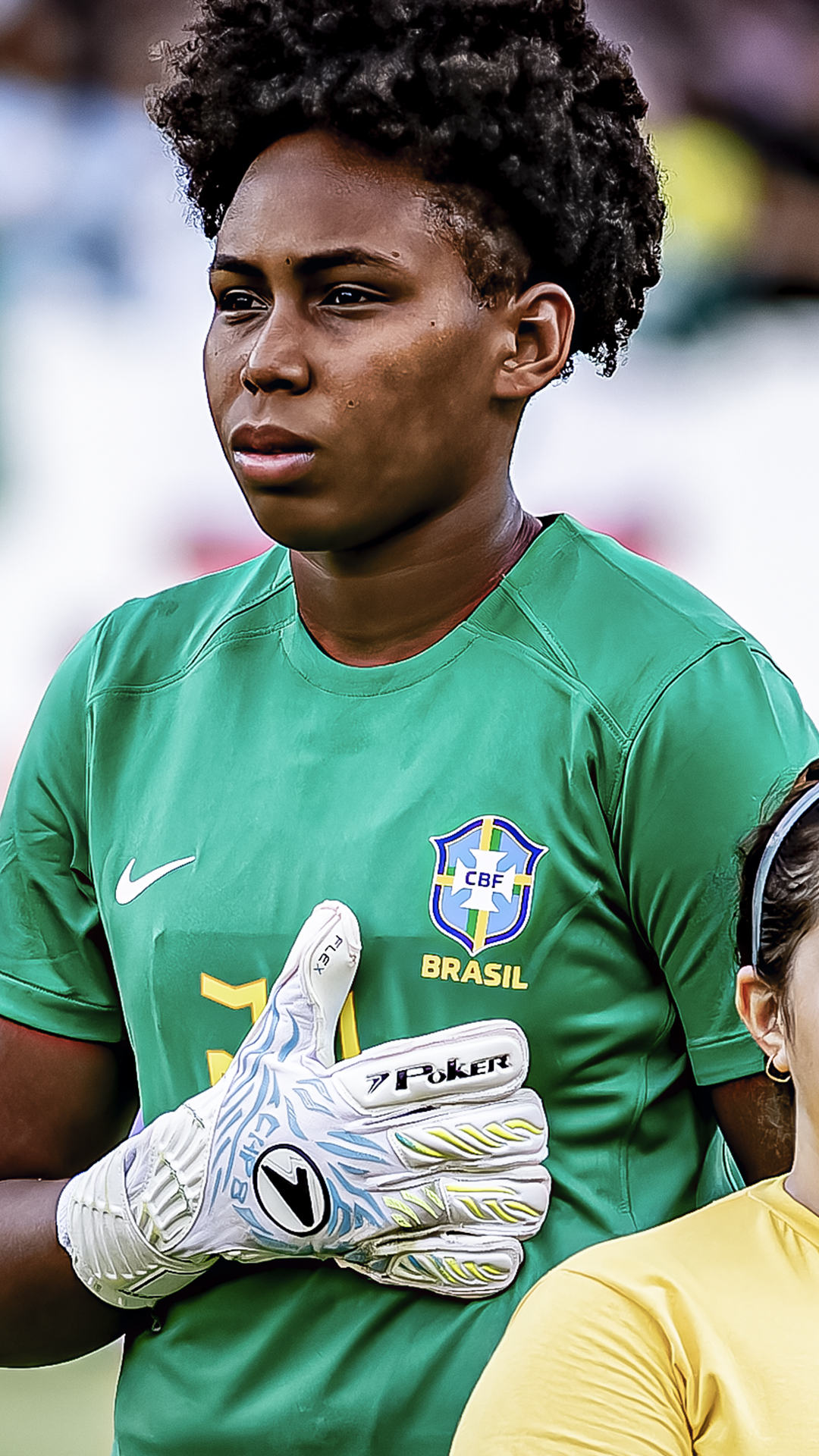

Personal information
- Full name: Camila Fernanda Gomes Rodrigues
- Date of birth: 2 January 2001 (age 25)
- Place of birth: São Luís, Brazil
- Height: 1.76 m (5 ft 9 in)
- Position: Goalkeeper

Team information
- Current team: Cruzeiro

Senior career*
Years	Team	Apps	(Gls)
2017–2018	Sampaio Corrêa		
2018	Viana		
2019	Chapecoense	2	(1)
2019	Internacional	0	(0)
2020	Iranduba	5	(0)
2020–2023	Santos	19	(0)
2024–	Cruzeiro	0	(0)
Medal record
Women's football
Representing Brazil
Copa América Femenina
Gold medal – first place	2025 Ecuador
- * Club domestic league appearances and goals as of 13:49, 13 November 2023 (UTC)

Camila Fernanda Gomes Rodrigues (born 2 January 2001), known as Camila Rodrigues or just Camila, is a Brazilian professional footballer who plays as a goalkeeper for Cruzeiro.

== Club career ==
Born in São Luís, Maranhão, Camila made her senior debut with hometown side Sampaio Corrêa in 2017. She subsequently played for Viana and Chapecoense, scoring a goal for the latter in a 1–5 Campeonato Brasileiro Série A2 loss against Palmeiras.

Camila moved to Internacional for the remainder of the 2019 season, but joined Iranduba on 7 January 2020, after not playing. On 19 September, she signed for Santos.

Camila became a starter of Peixe in the latter stages of the 2022 season, and renewed her contract for a further year on 1 December of that year. On 23 December 2023, she announced her departure from the club.

== International career ==
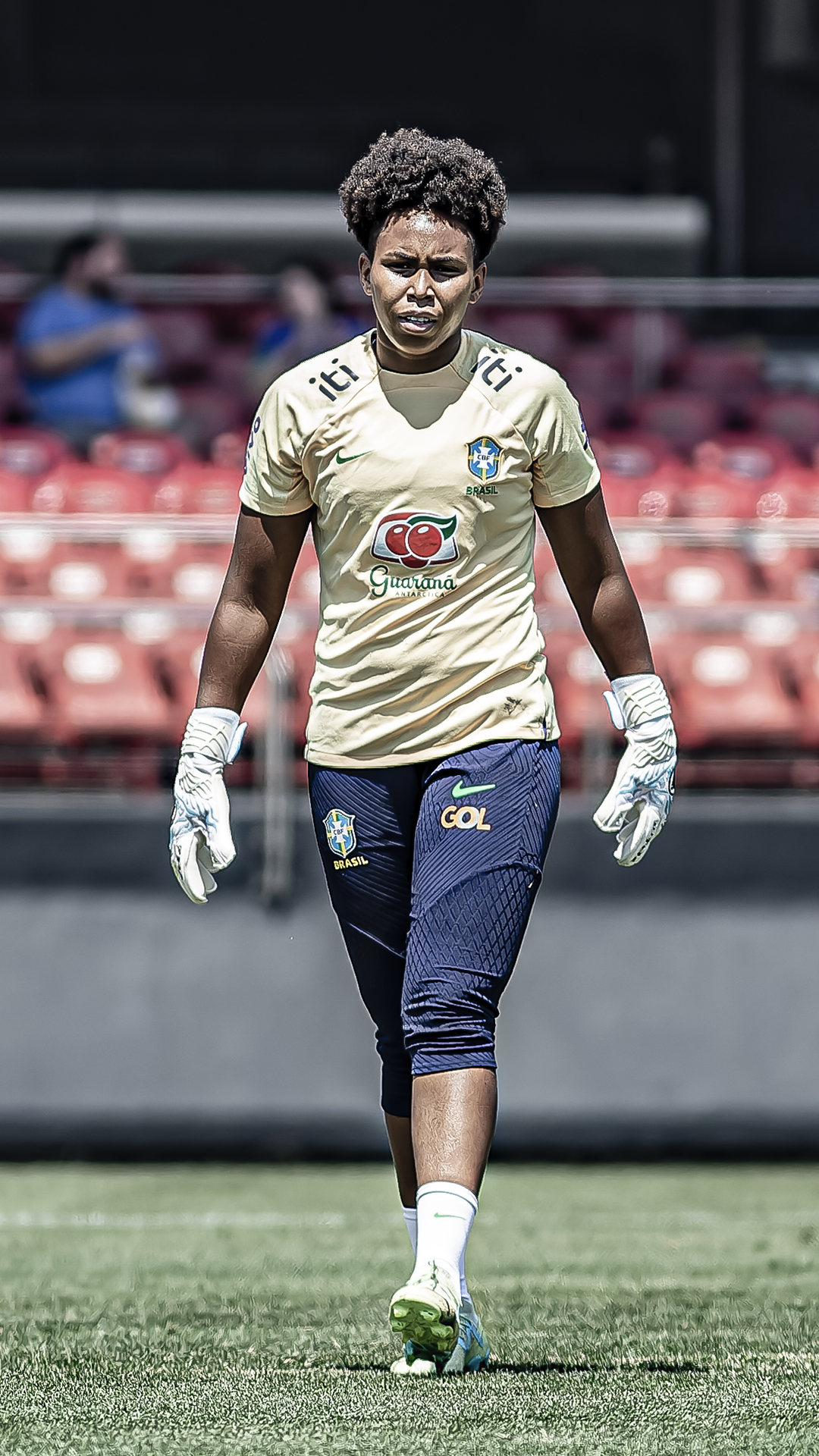
Camila with the Brazil national team in 2023

On 20 March 2023, Camila was called up to the Brazil national team for the 2023 Women's Finalissima against England. She was also included in the 23-women's list for the 2023 FIFA Women's World Cup.

== Honours ==
Santos

- Copa Paulista de Futebol Feminino: 2020
