= 2022 Campeonato Paulista de Futebol Feminino =

Women's football competition in Brazil

Campeonato Paulista de Futebol Feminino
- Season: 2022
- Dates: 10 August – 21 December 2021
- Champions: Palmeiras
- Matches: 72
- Goals: 265 (3.68 per match)
- Top goalscorer: (Brazil) Cristiane (19 goals)

The Paulista Football Championship of 2022 was the 30th edition of this women's football championship organized by the Paulista Football Federation (FPF). Played between August and December, the competition had twelve participants.

== Format ==
The 2022 Campeonato Paulista de Futebol Feminino was held in three stages:

In the first stage, the twelve teams were placed in a single group. Each team in the group played each other, and the four teams at the top of the table advanced to the semifinals. The teams that finished 5th through 8th place competed in the Copa Paulista.

In the semifinal phase, the top 4 teams were placed in two groups of two, with the first group containing the 2nd and 3rd placed teams and the second group containing the first and fourth placed teams. Each team played one home match and one away match. The teams from each group with the most points after two matches qualified for the finals. The semifinal groups followed the same tiebreaker criteria as the group stage.

The final phase was disputed by the top finishers of the two semifinal groups. The two teams each played a home and away match to determine the winner. The final group phase followed the same tiebreaker criteria as the semifinal phase and the group stage.

=== Tiebreaker criteria ===
In the case of tie between two and more teams the following criteria was used:

- Number of wins
- Goal difference
- Goals Scored
- Fewer red cards received
- Fewer yellow cards received
- Drawing of lots

== Teams ==
Team	City	2021 result
Corinthians	São Paulo	1st
EC São Bernardo	São Bernardo do Campo	–
Ferroviaria	Araraquara	4th
Palmeiras	São Paulo	5th
Pinda	Pindamonhangaba	10th
Portuguesa	São Paulo	12th
Realidade Jovem	São José do Rio Preto	9th
Red Bull Bragantino	Bragança Paulista	7th
Santos	Santos	3rd
São José	São José dos Campos	6th
São Paulo	São Paulo	2nd
Taubaté	Taubaté	8th

Source: "Guia do Paulistão Feminino" (PDF). FPF (in Portuguese).

== Standings ==
Pos	Team	Pld	W	D	L	GF	GA	GD	Pts	Qualification
1	Palmeiras	11	9	1	1	30	7	+23	28	Advance to Semi-final
2	São Paulo	11	9	0	2	33	6	+27	27	Advance to Semi-final
3	Santos	11	8	1	2	47	10	+37	25	Advance to Semi-final
4	Ferroviaria	11	8	0	3	31	11	+20	24	Advance to Semi-final
5	Corinthians	11	8	0	3	28	9	+19	24	
6	RB Bragantino	11	8	0	3	25	11	+14	24	
7	Taubaté	11	3	2	6	9	21	−12	11	
8	EC São Bernardo	11	2	3	6	11	37	−26	9	
9	São José	11	2	2	7	15	23	−8	8	
10	Pinda	11	1	3	7	5	27	−22	6	
11	Realidade Jovem	11	0	2	9	6	42	−36	2	
12	Portuguesa	11	0	2	9	6	42	−36	2	

Updated to match(es) played on 23 November 2022. Source: FPF
Rules for classification: 1) points; 2) wins; 3) goal difference; 4) goals scored; 5) head-to-head results (only between 2 teams); 6) fewest red cards; 7) fewest yellow cards; 8) draw.

== Bracket ==
Semi-finals
Palmeiras	4	1	5
Ferroviária	4	0	4
São Paulo	0	2	2
Santos	1	3	4

Finals
Palmeiras	1	2	3
Santos	0	1	1

== Semifinals ==
=== Semi-finals ===
Team 1	Agg.	Team 2	1st leg	2nd leg
Palmeiras	5 - 4	Ferroviária	4-4	1-0
São Paulo	2 - 4	Santos	1-0	2-3

8 December 2022
21:30

Ferroviária	4-4	Palmeiras
Ingryd 45'; Rafa Mineira 57'; Laryh 70', 77'	Report	25', 52' Ary Borges; 28' Andressinha; 45+1' Bia Zaneratto

Fonte Luminosa, Araraquara
Referee: João Vitor Gobi
12 December 2022
21:30

Palmeiras	1-0	Ferroviária
Andressinha 74'	Report

Arena Barueri, Barueri
Referee: Matheus Delgado Candançan

Palmeiras won 5-4 on aggregate and advanced to the final.

7 December 2022
21:30

Santos	1-0	São Paulo
Brena 70'	Report

Vila Belmiro, Santos
Referee: Gabriel Henrique Meira Bispo
11 December 2022
19:00

São Paulo	2-3	Santos
Naná 9'; Pardal 90'	Report	22', 27' Cristiane; 46' Fernandinha

Morumbi, São Paulo
Referee: Michel de Camargo

Santos won 4-2 on aggregate and advanced to the final.

== Final ==
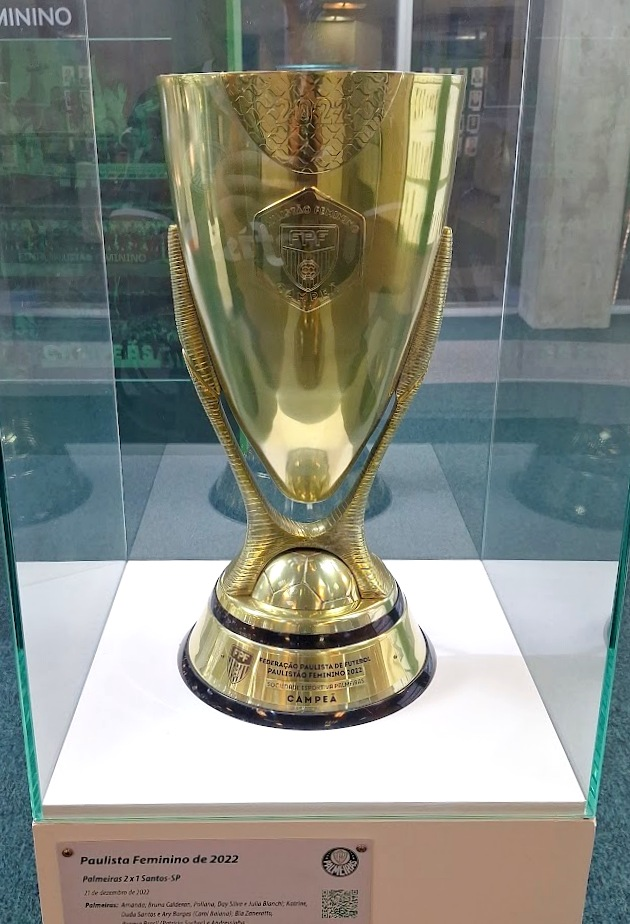
Trophy awarded to the champion Palmeiras

Team 1	Agg.	Team 2	1st leg	2nd leg
Palmeiras	3 – 1	Santos	0-1	2–1

17 December 2022
19:00

Santos	0-1	Palmeiras
	Report	90+3' Patrícia Sochor

Bruno José Daniel, Santo André
Referee: Marianna Nanni Batalha
21 December 2022
15:30

Palmeiras	2-1	Santos
Bia Zaneratto 67'; Ary Borges 77'	Report	82' Ketlen

Allianz Parque, São Paulo
Referee: Edina Alves Batista

== Top goalscorers ==
As of 22 December 2022

Rank	Player	Club	Goals
1	(Brazil) Cristiane	Santos	19
2	(Brazil) Ariel	Red Bull Bragantino	10
2	(Brazil) Ary Borges	Palmeiras	10
2	(Brazil) Bia Zaneratto	Palmeiras	10
2	(Brazil) Jheniffer	Corinthians	10
2	(Brazil) Laryh	Ferroviária	10
7	(Brazil) Ketlen	Santos	8

Source: Federação Paulista de Futebol
