= Fe Palermo =

Brazilian footballer (born 1996)

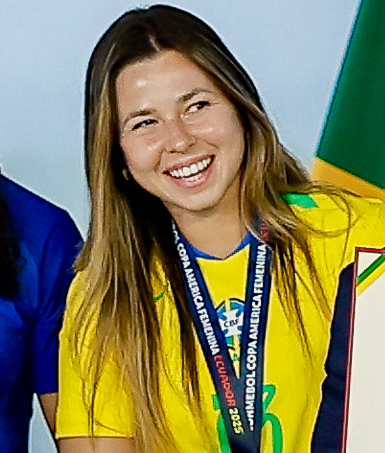
- Palermo in 2025

Personal information
- Full name: Fernanda Palermo Licen
- Date of birth: 18 August 1996 (age 30)
- Place of birth: Campinas, São Paulo, Brazil
- Height: 1.68 m (5 ft 6 in)
- Position: Left back

Team information
- Current team: Palmeiras
- Number: 6

Senior career*
Years	Team	Apps	(Gls)
2013–2014	Kindermann-Avaí	0	(0)
2015	Vitória PE	2	(0)
2016–2019	Flamengo	38	(5)
2020–2021	Santos	25	(0)
2022–2023	São Paulo	33	(2)
2024–	Palmeiras	4	(1)

International career^{‡}
2019–	Brazil	14	(1)
Medal record
Women's football
Representing Brazil
Copa América Femenina
Gold medal – first place	2025 Ecuador
- * Club domestic league appearances and goals as of 23:01, 23 April 2024 (UTC) ‡ National team caps and goals as of 23:01, 23 April 2024 (UTC)

Fernanda "Fe" Palermo Licen (born 18 August 1996) is a Brazilian professional footballer who plays as a left back for Palmeiras and the Brazil women's national team.

== Career ==
=== Vitória PE ===
Fê Palmero made her league debut against Viana on 9 September 2015.

=== Flamengo ===
Fê scored on her league debut against Vitória on 11 March 2017, scoring in the 90th+2nd minute.

=== Santos ===
Fê made her league debut against Flamengo on 8 February 2020.

=== São Paulo ===
Fê signed for São Paulo on 26 January 2022. She made her league debut against Internacional on 21 March 2022. Fê scored her first league goal against ESMAC on 24 April 2022, scoring in the 20th minute.

=== Palmeiras ===
Fê made her league debut against Flamengo on 16 March 2024. She scored her first league goal against Grêmio on 28 March 2024, scoring 25th minute.

== International career ==
Fê made her international debut against Mexico on 13 December 2019. She scored her first goal against Peru on 22 July 2022, scoring in the 48th minute.

== Career statistics ==
=== International ===
As of 17 April 2021

Brazil
Year	Apps	Goals
2019	1	0
Total	1	0

== International goals ==
Goal	Date	Location	Opponent	Score	Result	Competition
1	2022-07-21	Cali, Colombia	Peru	5–0	6–0	Copa América 2022
