= Luaninha =

Brazilian footballer (born 2003)

Personal information
- Full name: Luana Theodoro da Silva
- Date of birth: 11 February 2003 (age 23)
- Place of birth: Bauru, Brazil
- Height: 1.56 m (5 ft 1 in)
- Position: Midfielder

Team information
- Current team: Cruzeiro

Youth career
- Ferroviária
- 2018–2021: Santos

Senior career*
Years	Team	Apps	(Gls)
2020–2021	Santos	9	(1)
2022	Famalicão	2	(0)
2023–	Cruzeiro	0	(0)
- * Club domestic league appearances and goals as of 13:30, 2 February 2023 (UTC)

Luana Theodoro da Silva (born 11 February 2003), known as Luaninha or simply Luana, is a Brazilian footballer who plays as a midfielder for Cruzeiro.

== Club career ==
Born in Bauru, São Paulo, Luana joined Santos' youth setup in 2018, from Ferroviária. She made her first team debut on 26 August 2020, coming on as a second-half substitute for Erikinha and scoring his team's fifth in a 5–0 home routing of Audax.

On 23 January 2021, Luana signed her first professional contract with Santos. She left the club on 24 December, after failing to agree new terms.

In January 2022, Luaninha moved abroad and signed for Portuguese side Famalicão.

== Honours ==
Santos

- Copa Paulista de Futebol Feminino: 2020
