= SE Palmeiras (women) =

Brazilian football club

Palmeiras
- Full name: Sociedade Esportiva Palmeiras
- Nickname: Alviverde (White-Green)
- Founded: 1997; 29 years ago 2019 (re-founded)
- Ground: Arena Barueri
- Capacity: 31,452
- Director: Alberto Simão
- Head coach: Rosana Augusto
- League: Campeonato Brasileiro Série A1; Campeonato Paulista
- 2025 2025: Série A1, 3rd of 16; Paulista, 1st of 8 (champions)
- Website: https://www.palmeiras.com.br/pt-br/futebol-feminino/
Home colors	Away colors

Sociedade Esportiva Palmeiras, commonly known as Palmeiras, is a professional women's association football club based in Vinhedo, São Paulo, Brazil. Founded in 1997, the team is affiliated with Federação Paulista de Futebol and play their home games at Estádio Nelo Bracalente. The team colors, reflected in their logo and uniform, are green and white. They play in the top tier of women's football in Brazil, the Campeonato Brasileiro de Futebol Feminino, and in the Campeonato Paulista de Futebol Feminino, the first division of the traditional in-state competition.

== History ==
=== First spell ===
The Brazilian Football Confederation (CBF) successfully encouraged Palmeiras and its other leading clubs to form female teams in 1997, after the national women's team's performance had exceeded expectations at the 1996 Olympics.

In the initial phase of its existence, Palmeiras's women's team fielded several national team players and became competitive in state and national competition. Two of the 20-player Brazil squad at the 1999 FIFA Women's World Cup, Cidinha and Sissi, were contracted to Palmeiras. The team finished as runners-up in the 1999–2000 National Championship and won the 2001 Campeonato Paulista de Futebol Feminino.

In subsequent years Palmeiras competed only intermittently in women's competitions, by outsourcing their women's and girls teams to nearby local authorities, including São Bernardo do Campo (2005–06), Salto (2008) and Bauru in 2012.

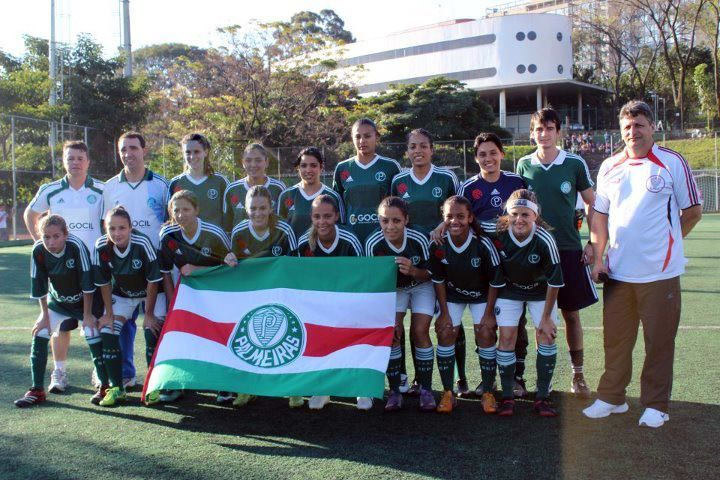
Palmeiras squad for the 2012 Campeonato Paulista de Futebol Feminino

== Seasons ==
=== 1997–2012 ===
During these first years, the team won the São Paulo Women's Football Championship in 2001 and the Regional Games in 2005, 2008 and 2010. The team was also runner-up in the Brazil Women's Cup in 2000.

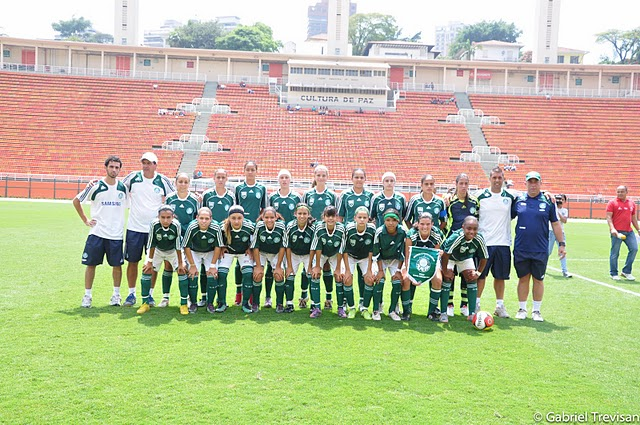
Palmeiras squad in 2010 at the Estádio do Pacaembu

=== 2019 ===
In 2019, in order to stimulate the growth of the sport, a rule came into effect requiring clubs to have a women's football team participating in a national competition in order for their men's teams to take part in the Copa Libertadores. In that year, Sociedade Esportiva Palmeiras reactivated its women's team and established its base in the city of Vinhedo, after signing a one-year partnership with the city’s local government. The choice of Vinhedo was made due to the historical identification with the club, since both had important contributions from Italian immigrants in their foundations. The matches are played at the Nelo Bracalente stadium, which has a capacity of around 4,000 spectators.

In its first year back, the team competed in the Campeonato Paulista, the Brazilian Série A2 Championship and the Copa Paulista. The team achieved expressive results, winning promotion to the top division of the Campeonato Brasileiro and becoming champion of the Copa Paulista, defeating rivals São Paulo 2–1 in the final.

The match that marked Palmeiras' return to the field in women's football took place on 27 March 2019, in the Série A2 of the Brazilian Championship, when Palmeiras defeated Moreninhas of Mato Grosso do Sul 8–0 in Vinhedo. The goals were scored by Lurdinha (2), Maressa (2), Luana (1), Karla (1), Isabella (1) and Thais (1).

=== 2020 ===
In 2020, the season was marked by the COVID-19 pandemic in Brazil, with most matches being played without spectators. The team reached the semifinals of both the Paulista Championship and the Brazilian Série A1 Championship.

=== 2021 ===
In 2021, Palmeiras competed in the Brazilian Championship Série A1, finishing the first stage undefeated and in second place overall. In the knockout stage, the team reached the final, finishing as runners-up and qualifying for the 2022 Copa Libertadores Femenina.

That same year, the supporters of 16 clubs in the Brazilian Women's Championship, including Palmeiras, launched the hashtag #elastemnome (“they have a name”) on social media, calling for the use of players’ names on their match shirts. In June 2021, the campaign succeeded and Palmeiras played its first match with names on the players' shirts on 20 June against Napoli of Santa Catarina.

Later in the year, Palmeiras played the Paulista Championship, finishing 5th in the round-robin stage, which led to elimination but secured a spot in the Copa Paulista. In the semifinals of the Copa Paulista, Palmeiras defeated Taubaté 1–0 and 3–1 to qualify for the final against São José. They won the first leg 3–0 and lost the second leg 2–1, securing the aggregate 4–2 victory and their second Copa Paulista title.

In December 2021, Palmeiras participated in the inaugural Brasil Ladies Cup, grouped with Santos, Flamengo, and River Plate. They drew 1–1 with Santos, beat Flamengo 1–0, and defeated River Plate 4–0. However, as they needed to win by at least six goals to surpass Santos on goal difference, Palmeiras were eliminated as second in the group. That match closed Palmeiras’ 2021 season.

=== 2022: First Copa Libertadores; second Paulista title ===
For the 2022 season, Palmeiras renewed 20 players and signed seven: Amanda, Day Silva, Sâmia Priscila, Patricia Sochor, Byanca Brasil (top scorer of the Brazilian Championship with 48 goals), Andressinha, and the return of Bia Zaneratto. The club competed in the Supercopa do Brasil, the Brazilian Championship, the Paulista Championship, and, for the first time, the Copa Libertadores Femenina.

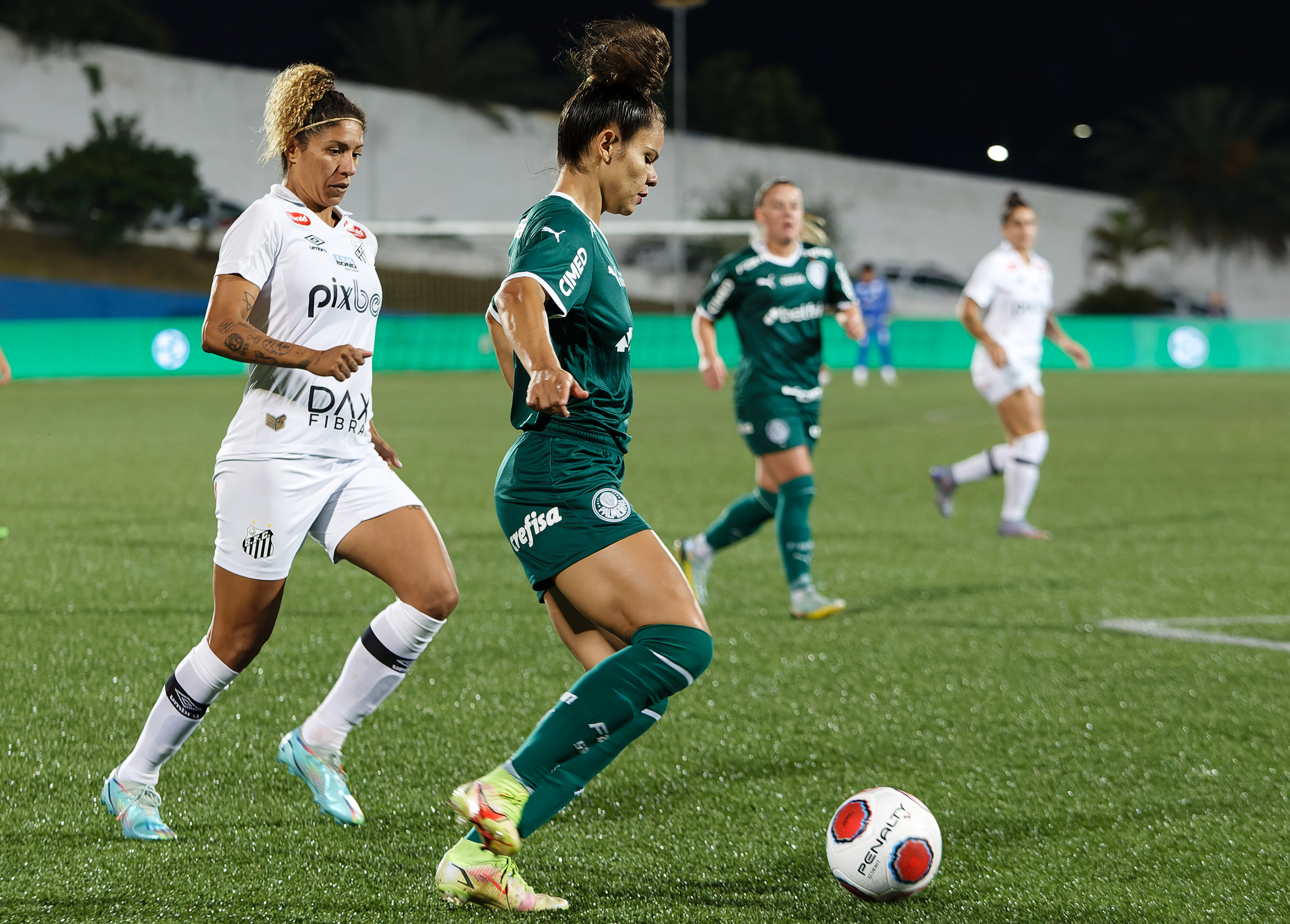
Palmeiras and Santos players during the first leg of the 2022 Paulista Championship final

In October 2022, in its first participation in the competition, Palmeiras won the Copa Libertadores Femenina, finishing unbeaten. The unprecedented title was achieved with a 4–1 victory over Boca Juniors in the final, with goals from Ary Borges, Byanca Brasil, Poliana and Bia Zaneratto, while Brisa Priori scored for the Argentines.

In December 2022, the team lifted its first official trophy at the Allianz Parque. Led by midfielder Bia Zaneratto, the players won the 2022 Paulista Championship, after defeating Santos 2–1 in the final.

The Paulista title match also set the attendance record for a women's football match at Allianz Parque, with around 20,000 spectators present.

=== 2025: Three titles; first national title ===
The team started the season with Camila Orlando as their coach, with whom they reached the semifinals of the Campeonato Brasileiro but lost to Cruzeiro and with whom they won their first ever title at the Brasil Ladies Cup, beating Grêmio at the final on the Estádio do Canindé.

After that final, Camila Orlando left to train the youth team of the Brazil women's national team and Rosana Augusto, a former Palmeiras player, was hired as the team's new coach. With Rosana Augusto the team won their first ever national title in history at the Copa do Brasil, beating Ferroviária at the final, which also qualified the team to play in the 2026 edition of the Supercopa do Brasil, and won their fourth title at the Campeonato Paulista after beating Corinthians at the final for the second consecutive year. The score of that final was 5-1 for Palmeiras in the first game and 1-0 for Corinthians on the second.

In 2025, Palmeiras qualified for the 2026 Copa Libertadores after finishing third in the Campeonato Brasileiro. The qualification was secured because Corinthians won both the Campeonato Brasileiro and the Copa Libertadores, which opened an additional Libertadores berth for the third-placed team in the national league. It was the third time the team qualified to play at the Libertadores.

== Players ==
=== Current squad ===
As of 10 August 2026

Note: Flags indicate national team as defined under FIFA eligibility rules; some limited exceptions apply. Players may hold more than one non-FIFA nationality.

No.	Pos.	Nation	Player
1	GK	BRA	Tainá
2	DF	COL	Ana Guzmán
3	DF	BRA	Poliana
4	DF	BRA	Giovanna Campiolo
5	MF	BRA	Ingryd Lima
6	DF	BRA	Fe Palermo
7	MF	BRA	Brena Carolina
8	MF	BRA	Diany Martins
9	FW	BRA	Gláucia
10	FW	BRA	Bia Zaneratto (captain)
11	FW	BRA	Taina Maranhão
12	MF	BRA	Duda Santos
13	DF	BRA	Pati Maldaner
14	GK	BRA	Bruna Hirata
15	MF	BRA	Duda Basílio
16	DF	BRA	Emily Assis
17	MF	BRA	Isadora Amaral
18	FW	BRA	Layssa Santos
19	MF	BRA	Laís Melo
20	MF	BRA	Andressinha

No.	Pos.	Nation	Player
21	DF	BRA	Carla Tays
22	GK	BRA	Natascha
24	FW	COL	Greicy Landazury
25	GK	COL	Kate Tapia
26	MF	BRA	Lais Estevam
28	FW	BRA	Victoria Liss
30	DF	BRA	Ana Guimarães
31	MF	BRA	Ana Flávia
33	MF	ARG	Lorena Benítez
34	DF	BRA	Raíssa Bahia
35	MF	BRA	Julia Brito
37	MF	VEN	Melanie Chirinos
42	GK	BRA	Ravena
44	DF	BRA	Maria Clara
47	DF	BRA	Vitorinha
77	FW	BRA	Rhay Coutinho
88	MF	BRA	Ana Júlia
96	MF	BRA	Dudinha
99	MF	ECU	Joselyn Espinales
—	MF	VEN	Gellinot Reyes
—	DF	BRA	Antônia

=== Former players ===
For details of current and former players, see Category:SE Palmeiras (women) players.

== Honours ==
=== Official tournaments ===
Continental
Competitions	Titles	Seasons
Copa Libertadores Femenina	1	2022
National
Competitions	Titles	Seasons
Copa do Brasil	1	2025
Supercopa do Brasil	1	2026
State
Competitions	Titles	Seasons
Campeonato Paulista	4^{s}	2001, 2022, 2024, 2025
Copa Paulista	2^{s}	2019, 2021

- record
- ^{s} shared record

=== Friendly tournaments ===
- Brasil Ladies Cup (1): 2025

== See also ==
- SE Palmeiras
- Sociedade Esportiva Palmeiras (basketball)
