= 2026 Copa Libertadores Femenina =

18th edition of the CONMEBOL Libertadores Femenina

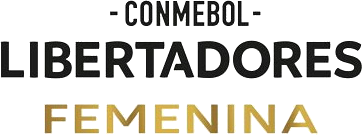

Tournament details
- Host country: Ecuador
- City: Quito
- Dates: 15–31 October 2026
- Teams: 16 (from 10 associations)
- Venues: 2 (in 1 host city)

Final positions
- Champions: (Brazil) Cruzeiro (1st title)
- Runners-up: (Brazil) Corinthians
- Third place: (Colombia) Santa Fe
- Fourth place: (Paraguay) Olimpia

Tournament statistics
- Matches played: 32
- Goals scored: 115 (3.59 per match)
- Top scorer: Three players (6 goals each)

The 2026 Copa CONMEBOL Libertadores Femenina was the 18th edition of the CONMEBOL Libertadores Femenina (also referred to as the Copa Libertadores Femenina), South America's premier women's club football tournament organized by CONMEBOL. The competition was held in Ecuador from 15 to 31 October 2026.

Brazilian side Cruzeiro were the champions, winning their first Copa Libertadores Femenina title in their debut after defeating the defending champions Corinthians on penalty kicks following a 4–4 draw in the final. By winning the tournament, Cruzeiro qualified for the 2027 FIFA Women's Champions Cup and the 2028 FIFA Women's Club World Cup.

== Format ==
For the group stage, the 16 teams were drawn into four groups. Teams in each group played one another in a round-robin basis, with the top two teams of each group advancing to the quarter-finals. Starting from the quarter-finals, the teams played a single-elimination tournament.

=== Prizes ===
Aside from qualification for the 2027 FIFA Women's Champions Cup and the 2028 FIFA Women's Club World Cup, the champions were awarded with a monetary prize of two million dollars, with the runners-up receiving US$600,000 and the third-placed team being awarded US$250,000. The other participating teams earned a participation prize of US$50,000.

== Teams ==
The 16 participating teams were:

- the champions of all ten CONMEBOL associations
- the title holders
- an additional team from the host association
- four additional teams from associations with the best historical performance in the tournament (associations in **bold** received two berths according to the points total until the 2025 edition).
  1. Brazil: 320 points
  2. Colombia: 185 points
  3. Chile: 169 points
  4. Paraguay: 135 points
  5. Argentina: 123 points
  6. Ecuador: 83 points
  7. Venezuela: 82 points
  8. Uruguay: 56 points
  9. Peru: 47 points
  10. Bolivia: 43 points

Association	Team	Qualifying method	Participation	Previous best result
Argentina	Belgrano	2025 Trofeo de Campeonas champions	1st	—
Bolivia	Bolívar	2026 Liga Femenina de Fútbol Boliviano champions	1st	—
Brazil	Corinthians (Brazil 1)	2025 Copa Libertadores Femenina champions	9th (Note: Corinthians won the 2017 title in a partnership with Audax. They created their own team for the 2018 season.)	**Champions** (2017, 2019, 2021, 2023, 2024, 2025)
Brazil	Cruzeiro (Brazil 2)	2025 Campeonato Brasileiro Feminino Série A1 runners-up (Note: As the title holders Corinthians were also the 2025 Campeonato Brasileiro Feminino Série A1 champions, runners-up Cruzeiro and third place Palmeiras qualified for the Brazil 2 and Brazil 3 berths, respectively.)	1st	—
Brazil	Palmeiras (Brazil 3)	2025 Campeonato Brasileiro Feminino Série A1 third place	3rd	**Champions** (2022)
Chile	Colo-Colo (Chile 1)	2025 Liga Femenina champions	12th	**Champions** (2012)
Chile	Universidad de Chile (Chile 2)	2025 Liga Femenina runners-up	6th	Fourth place (2020)
Colombia	Deportivo Cali (Colombia 1)	2026 Liga Femenina champions	5th	Runners-up (2025)
Colombia	Santa Fe (Colombia 2)	2026 Liga Femenina runners-up	7th	Runners-up (2021, 2024)
Ecuador (hosts)	Independiente del Valle (Ecuador 1)	2026 Superliga Femenina champions	4th	Fourth place (2024)
Ecuador (hosts)	LDU Quito (Ecuador 2)	2026 Superliga Femenina runners-up	2nd	Group stage (2011)
Paraguay	Libertad (Paraguay 1)	2025 Campeonato Anual FEM champions	7th (Note: Libertad's first four participations were in a partnership with Sportivo Limpeño.)	Quarter-finals (2025)
Paraguay	Olimpia (Paraguay 2)	2025 Campeonato Anual FEM runners-up	5th	Quarter-finals (2023, 2024)
Peru	Universitario	2025 Liga Femenina Clausura winners	6th	Group stage (2015, 2016, 2017, 2020, 2023)
Uruguay	Nacional	2025 Campeonato Uruguayo Femenino champions	8th	Fourth place (2021)
Venezuela	Caracas	2026 Liga FUTVE Femenina champions	7th	Runners-up (2014)

== Venues ==
On 31 August 2026, CONMEBOL confirmed Quito as the host city, being this the third time the Ecuadorian capital hosted the competition. Two stadiums were used during the tournament:

- Estadio Rodrigo Paz Delgado (capacity 41,575)
- Estadio Banco Guayaquil (capacity 12,000)

== Match officials ==
On 1 October 2026, CONMEBOL announced the referees and assistant referees appointed for the tournament, including a refereeing team from UEFA as part of the continuation of the UEFA–CONMEBOL memorandum of understanding signed in February 2020, which included a referee exchange programme since 2021.

Association / Confederation	Referees	Assistant referees
Argentina	Roberta Echeverría; Salomé di Iorio	Mariana de Almeida; Gisela Bosso
Bolivia	Adriana Farfán; Wilma Balderrama	Maricela Urapuca; Inés Choque
Brazil	Charly Straub; Daiane Muniz	Neuza Back; Fabrini Bevilaqua
Chile	Dione Rissios	Leslie Vásquez; Yomara Salazar
Colombia	Erika Sánchez; María Victoria Daza	Mayra Sánchez; Iris Alarcón
Ecuador	Jennifer Canchingre; Susana Corella	Viviana Segura; Joselyn Romero
Paraguay	Angelina Rodas	Nadia Weiler; Nancy Fernández
Peru	Milagros Arruela; Gaby Oncoy	Mariana Aquino; Diana Ruiz
Uruguay	Anahí Fernández; Nadia Fuques	Daiana Fernández; Adela Sánchez
Venezuela	Stefani Escobar	Migdalia Rodríguez; Francis García
UEFA	(Poland) Michalina Diakow	(Spain) Nahia Alonso Fernández (Portugal) Sara Silva Cunha

== Draw ==
The draw for the tournament was held on 14 September 2026, 12:30 PYT (UTC−3), at the CONMEBOL headquarters in Luque, Paraguay. The 16 teams were drawn into four groups of four.

Two teams were directly assigned as seeds of groups A and B:

- To Group A: as 2025 Copa Libertadores Femenina champions, Corinthians (Brazil 1)
- To Group B: the champions of the host association, Independiente del Valle (Ecuador 1)

The remaining teams (excluding the four teams from national associations with an extra berth) were seeded into three pots based on the final placement of their national association's club in the previous edition of the tournament, with the highest two (Brazil 2 and Colombia 1) placed in Pot 1, the next four (Chile 1, Paraguay 1, Ecuador 2 and Argentina) placed in Pot 2 and the lowest four (Peru, Uruguay, Venezuela and Bolivia) in Pot 3. The four additional teams from associations with the best historical performance (Brazil 3, Chile 2, Colombia 2 and Paraguay 2) were seeded into Pot 4. From Pot 1, the first team drawn was placed into group C and the second team drawn placed into group D, both teams assigned to position 1 in their group. From each remaining pot, the first team drawn was placed into Group A, the second team drawn placed into Group B, the third team drawn placed into Group C and the final team drawn placed into Group D, with teams from Pot 2, 3 and 4 assigned to positions 2, 3 and 4 in their group. Teams from the same association could not be drawn into the same group.

Pot 1	Pot 2	Pot 3	Pot 4
(Brazil) Cruzeiro; (Colombia) Deportivo Cali (Note: The identities of the two Colombian teams were not known at the time of the draw.)	(Chile) Colo-Colo; (Paraguay) Libertad; (Ecuador) LDU Quito; (Argentina) Belgrano	(Peru) Universitario; (Uruguay) Nacional; (Venezuela) Caracas; (Bolivia) Bolívar	(Brazil) Palmeiras; Universidad de Chile; (Colombia) Santa Fe; (Paraguay) Olimpia

The draw resulted in the following groups:

Group A
Pos	Team
A1	(Brazil) Corinthians
A2	(Chile) Colo-Colo
A3	(Venezuela) Caracas
A4	(Colombia) Santa Fe

Group B
Pos	Team
B1	(Ecuador) Independiente del Valle
B2	(Argentina) Belgrano
B3	(Peru) Universitario
B4	(Brazil) Palmeiras

Group C
Pos	Team
C1	(Brazil) Cruzeiro
C2	(Ecuador) LDU Quito
C3	(Bolivia) Bolívar
C4	(Paraguay) Olimpia

Group D
Pos	Team
D1	(Colombia) Deportivo Cali
D2	(Paraguay) Libertad
D3	(Uruguay) Nacional
D4	Universidad de Chile

== Group stage ==
In the group stage, the teams were ranked according to points (3 points for a win, 1 point for a draw, 0 points for a loss). If tied on points, tiebreakers were applied in the following order (Regulations Article 23).

1. Head-to-head result in games between tied teams;
  1. Points obtained in the matches played between the teams in question;
  2. Goal difference in the matches played between the teams in question;
  3. Number of goals scored in the matches played between the teams in question;
2. Goal difference in all group matches;
3. Goals scored in all group matches;
4. Number of red cards;
5. Number of yellow cards;
6. Drawing of lots.

The winners and runners-up of each group advanced to the quarter-finals.

All times are local, ECT (UTC–5).

=== Group A ===
Pos	Team	Pld	W	D	L	GF	GA	GD	Pts	Qualification
1	(Brazil) Corinthians	3	3	0	0	14	1	+13	9	Quarter-finals
2	(Colombia) Santa Fe	3	2	0	1	6	8	−2	6	Quarter-finals
3	(Chile) Colo-Colo	3	1	0	2	4	4	0	3	
4	(Venezuela) Caracas	3	0	0	3	2	13	−11	0	

Source: CONMEBOL
15 October 2026
15:00

Corinthians (Brazil)	2–0	(Chile) Colo-Colo
Victória 5'; Jaqueline 71' (pen.)	Report

Estadio Rodrigo Paz Delgado, Quito
Referee: Jennifer Canchingre (Ecuador)
16 October 2026 (Note: The Caracas vs Santa Fe match, originally scheduled for 15 October 2026, 19:00 local time was rescheduled to 16 October 2026, 22:00 local time.)
22:00

Caracas (Venezuela)	2–3	(Colombia) Santa Fe
Mota 25' (pen.); Solórzano 47'	Report	Valbuena 44'; Zamorano 45+9' (pen.); Pérez 90+2'

Estadio Rodrigo Paz Delgado, Quito
Referee: Adriana Farfán (Bolivia)

18 October 2026
15:00

Colo-Colo (Chile)	1–2	(Colombia) Santa Fe
Cifuentes 52'	Report	Zamorano 64', 90+3'

Estadio Rodrigo Paz Delgado, Quito
Referee: Milagros Arruela (Peru)
18 October 2026
19:00

Corinthians (Brazil)	7–0	(Venezuela) Caracas
Andressa Alves 13'; Jaqueline 20'; Duda Sampaio 30', 67'; García 57' (pen.); Gabi Zanotti 76'; Robledo 90+1'	Report

Estadio Rodrigo Paz Delgado, Quito
Referee: Nadia Fuques (Uruguay)

21 October 2026
15:00

Santa Fe (Colombia)	1–5	(Brazil) Corinthians
Ibargüen 4'	Report	Duda Sampaio 6'; Victória 44' (pen.); Aquino 49', 60'; Robledo 84'

Estadio Banco Guayaquil, Quito
Referee: Roberta Echeverría (Argentina)
21 October 2026
15:00

Colo-Colo (Chile)	3–0	(Venezuela) Caracas
Aedo 37'; Valencia 45+1'; Banini 90+2'	Report

Estadio Rodrigo Paz Delgado, Quito
Referee: Angelina Rodas (Paraguay)

=== Group B ===
Pos	Team	Pld	W	D	L	GF	GA	GD	Pts	Qualification
1	(Brazil) Palmeiras	3	2	1	0	5	2	+3	7	Quarter-finals
2	(Ecuador) Independiente del Valle (H)	3	1	2	0	6	4	+2	5	Quarter-finals
3	(Argentina) Belgrano	3	1	1	1	6	6	0	4	
4	(Peru) Universitario	3	0	0	3	4	9	−5	0	

Source: CONMEBOL
(H) Hosts
15 October 2026
15:00

Independiente del Valle (Ecuador)	1–1	(Argentina) Belgrano
Páez 41' (pen.)	Report	Paz 24'

Estadio Banco Guayaquil, Quito
Referee: Anahí Fernández (Uruguay)
15 October 2026
19:00

Universitario (Peru)	0–1	(Brazil) Palmeiras
	Report	Brena 14'

Estadio Banco Guayaquil, Quito
Referee: Erika Sánchez (Colombia)

18 October 2026
15:00

Belgrano (Argentina)	1–3	(Brazil) Palmeiras
Paz 14'	Report	Bia Zaneratto 27', 52'; Brena 36'

Estadio Banco Guayaquil, Quito
Referee: Stefani Escobar (Venezuela)
18 October 2026
19:00

Independiente del Valle (Ecuador)	4–2	(Peru) Universitario
Lacoste 2' (o.g.); Charcopa 8'; Murcia 41'; Páez 78'	Report	Núñez 23', 45'

Estadio Banco Guayaquil, Quito
Referee: Angelina Rodas (Paraguay)

21 October 2026
19:00

Palmeiras (Brazil)	1–1	(Ecuador) Independiente del Valle
Bia Zaneratto 76' (pen.)	Report	Burgos 84'

Estadio Banco Guayaquil, Quito
Referee: Anahí Fernández (Uruguay)
21 October 2026
19:00

Belgrano (Argentina)	4–2	(Peru) Universitario
Ceballos 31', 41', 90+11' (pen.); Paz 49'	Report	Araya 2', 46'

Estadio Rodrigo Paz Delgado, Quito
Referee: Adriana Farfán (Bolivia)

=== Group C ===
Pos	Team	Pld	W	D	L	GF	GA	GD	Pts	Qualification
1	(Brazil) Cruzeiro	3	3	0	0	8	1	+7	9	Quarter-finals
2	(Paraguay) Olimpia	3	1	1	1	3	5	−2	4	Quarter-finals
3	(Ecuador) LDU Quito (H)	3	1	0	2	7	3	+4	3	
4	(Bolivia) Bolívar	3	0	1	2	2	11	−9	1	

Source: CONMEBOL
(H) Hosts
16 October 2026
15:00

Bolívar (Bolivia)	2–2	(Paraguay) Olimpia
Clenilda 5'; Méndez 70'	Report	Villalba 6'; Cartamán 48'

Estadio Rodrigo Paz Delgado, Quito
Referee: Michalina Diakow (Poland)
16 October 2026
19:00

Cruzeiro (Brazil)	2–1	(Ecuador) LDU Quito
Gisseli 9'; Byanca Brasil 64'	Report	Cuadra 35'

Estadio Rodrigo Paz Delgado, Quito
Referee: Dione Rissios (Chile)

19 October 2026
15:00

Cruzeiro (Brazil)	3–0	(Bolivia) Bolívar
Byanca Brasil 51', 75', 89' (pen.)	Report

Estadio Rodrigo Paz Delgado, Quito
Referee: Erika Sánchez (Colombia)
19 October 2026
19:00

LDU Quito (Ecuador)	0–1	(Paraguay) Olimpia
	Report	Valdez 90'

Estadio Rodrigo Paz Delgado, Quito
Referee: Roberta Echeverría (Argentina)

22 October 2026
19:00

Olimpia (Paraguay)	0–3	(Brazil) Cruzeiro
	Report	Gisseli 20'; Marília 47'; Rafa Levis 71'

Estadio Banco Guayaquil, Quito
Referee: Dione Rissios (Chile)
22 October 2026
19:00

LDU Quito (Ecuador)	6–0	(Bolivia) Bolívar
Barahona 6', 13', 50' (pen.); Angulo 10'; Aldana 46'; Caicedo 68'	Report

Estadio Rodrigo Paz Delgado, Quito
Referee: Michalina Diakow (Poland)

=== Group D ===
Pos	Team	Pld	W	D	L	GF	GA	GD	Pts	Qualification
1	(Colombia) Deportivo Cali	3	2	1	0	6	3	+3	7	Quarter-finals
2	(Paraguay) Libertad	3	1	2	0	5	4	+1	5	Quarter-finals
3	(Uruguay) Nacional	3	0	2	1	2	4	−2	2	
4	Universidad de Chile	3	0	1	2	3	5	−2	1	

Source: CONMEBOL
16 October 2026
15:00

Deportivo Cali (Colombia)	1–1	(Paraguay) Libertad
Bermeo 90+3'	Report	Martínez 70'

Estadio Banco Guayaquil, Quito
Referee: Roberta Echeverría (Argentina)
16 October 2026
19:00

Nacional (Uruguay)	0–0	Universidad de Chile
	Report

Estadio Banco Guayaquil, Quito
Referee: Charly Straub (Brazil)

19 October 2026
15:00

Deportivo Cali (Colombia)	2–0	(Uruguay) Nacional
Guerra 40'; Castellanos 79'	Report

Estadio Banco Guayaquil, Quito
Referee: Daiane Muniz (Brazil)
19 October 2026
19:00

Libertad (Paraguay)	2–1	Universidad de Chile
Genes 11'; Tamay 27'	Report	Santander 88'

Estadio Banco Guayaquil, Quito
Referee: Jennifer Canchingre (Ecuador)

22 October 2026
15:00

Universidad de Chile	2–3	(Colombia) Deportivo Cali
Zamora 38' (pen.); Acosta 39'	Report	Morales 7', 35'; Guerra 17'

Estadio Banco Guayaquil, Quito
Referee: Charly Straub (Brazil)
22 October 2026
15:00

Libertad (Paraguay)	2–2	(Uruguay) Nacional
Peña 14'; De León 28'	Report	Cesane 67'; Márcora 77'

Estadio Rodrigo Paz Delgado, Quito
Referee: Stefani Escobar (Venezuela)

== Final stages ==
Starting from the quarter-finals, the teams played a single-elimination tournament. If tied after full time, extra time was not played, and a penalty shoot-out was used to determine the winners (Regulations Article 26).

=== Bracket ===
Quarter-finals
24 October – Banco Guayaquil
(Brazil) Corinthians	5
(Ecuador) Independiente del Valle	0
24 October – Banco Guayaquil
(Brazil) Palmeiras	2 (2)
(Colombia) Santa Fe (p)	2 (3)
25 October – Banco Guayaquil
(Brazil) Cruzeiro	3
(Paraguay) Libertad	0
25 October – Banco Guayaquil
(Colombia) Deportivo Cali	0
(Paraguay) Olimpia	1

Semi-finals
28 October – Rodrigo Paz Delgado
(Brazil) Corinthians	2
(Colombia) Santa Fe	1
28 October – Rodrigo Paz Delgado
(Brazil) Cruzeiro	1
(Paraguay) Olimpia	0

Final
31 October – Rodrigo Paz Delgado
(Brazil) Corinthians	4 (4)
(Brazil) Cruzeiro (p)	4 (5)
Third place
31 October – Rodrigo Paz Delgado
(Paraguay) Olimpia	3
(Colombia) Santa Fe	4

=== Quarter-finals ===
24 October 2026
15:00

Palmeiras (Brazil)	2–2	(Colombia) Santa Fe
Brena 9'; Raíssa 62'	Report	Zamorano 69'; Ortegón 90'
Penalties
Bia Zaneratto (penalty scored); Duda (penalty scored); Brena (penalty missed); Fe Palermo (penalty missed); Pati Maldaner (penalty missed)	2–3	(penalty scored) Motta; (penalty missed) Torres; (penalty scored) Zamorano; (penalty missed) Cabrera; (penalty scored) Ibargüen

Estadio Banco Guayaquil, Quito
Referee: Dione Rissios (Chile)

24 October 2026
19:00

Corinthians (Brazil)	5–0	(Ecuador) Independiente del Valle
Duda Sampaio 50'; Victória 51', 65'; Gabi Zanotti 62', 90+3'	Report

Estadio Banco Guayaquil, Quito
Referee: Stefani Escobar (Venezuela)

25 October 2026
15:00

Deportivo Cali (Colombia)	0–1	(Paraguay) Olimpia
	Report	Ortiz 90+1'

Estadio Banco Guayaquil, Quito
Referee: Jennifer Canchingre (Ecuador)

25 October 2026
19:00

Cruzeiro (Brazil)	3–0	(Paraguay) Libertad
Vanessinha 53'; Letícia Alves 58'; Byanca Brasil 87' (pen.)	Report

Estadio Banco Guayaquil, Quito
Referee: Michalina Diakow (Poland)

=== Semi-finals ===
28 October 2026
15:00

Corinthians (Brazil)	2–1	(Colombia) Santa Fe
Letícia Monteiro 36'; Gi Fernandes 76'	Report	Garavito 29'

Estadio Rodrigo Paz Delgado, Quito
Referee: Roberta Echeverría (Argentina)

28 October 2026
19:00

Cruzeiro (Brazil)	1–0	(Paraguay) Olimpia
Marília 50'	Report

Estadio Rodrigo Paz Delgado, Quito
Referee: Anahí Fernández (Uruguay)

=== Third place match ===
31 October 2026
15:00

Olimpia (Paraguay)	3–4	(Colombia) Santa Fe
Riso 25'; Pereira 40'; Ortiz 49'	Report	Zamorano 19', 23'; Garavito 90+1'; Ortegón 90+6'

Estadio Rodrigo Paz Delgado, Quito
Referee: Jennifer Canchingre (Ecuador)

=== Final ===
31 October 2026
19:00

Corinthians (Brazil)	4–4	(Brazil) Cruzeiro
Gabi Zanotti 4', 42'; Victória 49', 68'	Report	Byanca Brasil 52'; Calhau 58' (pen.); Ketlin 75'; Letícia Ferreira 90+1'
Penalties
Victória (penalty scored); Duda Sampaio (penalty scored); Jaqueline (penalty missed); Aquino (penalty scored); Thaís Ferreira (penalty scored); Robledo (penalty missed); Gi Fernandes (penalty missed)	4–5	(penalty scored) Byanca Brasil; (penalty scored) Letícia Ferreira; (penalty missed) Pri Back; (penalty scored) Romero; (penalty scored) Calhau; (penalty missed) Bedoya; (penalty scored) Milena Ferreira

Estadio Rodrigo Paz Delgado, Quito
Referee: Dione Rissios (Chile)

Corinthians	Cruzeiro

GK	12	(Brazil) Lelê
CB	4	(Brazil) Thaís Regina	(yellow card) 70'
CB	99	(Brazil) Érika
CB	5	(Brazil) Thaís Ferreira
RM	23	(Brazil) Gi Fernandes
CM	27	(Brazil) Duda Sampaio
CM	31	(Venezuela) Dayana Rodríguez	(yellow card) 63'	(substituted off) 68'
CM	19	(Brazil) Letícia Monteiro		(substituted off) 61'
LM	37	(Brazil) Tamires		(substituted off) 84'
CF	17	(Brazil) Victória
CF	10	(Brazil) Gabi Zanotti (c)		(substituted off) 84'
Substitutes:
GK	1	(Brazil) Nicole
DF	22	(Brazil) Juliete		(substituted on) 84'
DF	33	(Brazil) Duda Mineira
MF	7	(Colombia) Gisela Robledo		(substituted on) 84'
MF	20	(Colombia) Paola García
FW	8	(Brazil) Andressa Alves
FW	11	(Brazil) Ariel Godoi
FW	13	(Brazil) Ivana Fuso
FW	25	(Uruguay) Belén Aquino		(substituted on) 68'
FW	30	(Brazil) Jaqueline		(substituted on) 61'
Manager:
(Brazil) Emily Lima

GK	12	(Brazil) Camila Rodrigues
CB	2	(Venezuela) Yenifer Giménez
CB	26	(Brazil) Isadora Amaral		(substituted off) 59'
CB	33	(Brazil) Vitória Calhau
RM	99	(Brazil) Letícia Alves		(substituted off) 90'
CM	5	(Colombia) Lorena Bedoya	(yellow card) 87'
CM	55	(Brazil) Ana Flávia		(substituted off) 59'
LM	8	(Brazil) Gisseli		(substituted off) 59'
RW	20	(Brazil) Marília		(substituted off) 80'
FW	7	(Brazil) Vanessinha
CF	10	(Brazil) Byanca Brasil (c)
Substitutes:
GK	1	(Brazil) Leilane
GK	22	(Brazil) Taluane
DF	15	(Venezuela) Michelle Romero		(substituted on) 80'
DF	25	(Brazil) Ketlin		(substituted on) 59'
MF	6	(Brazil) Isabela Capelinha
MF	23	(Brazil) Rafa Levis
MF	93	(Brazil) Pri Back		(substituted on) 59'
FW	9	(Brazil) Letícia Ferreira	(yellow card) 90+3'	(substituted on) 59'
FW	11	(Colombia) Gabriela Rodríguez
FW	21	(Brazil) Milena Ferreira		(substituted on) 90'
FW	24	(Brazil) Radija
FW	28	(Brazil) Mari Andrade
Manager:
(Brazil) Jonas Urias

Assistant referees:
Leslie Vásquez (Chile)
Yomara Salazar (Chile)
Fourth official:
Michalina Diakow (Poland)
Fifth official:
Nahia Alonso (Spain)
Video assistant referee:
Milagros Arruela (Peru)
Assistant video assistant referee:
Gaby Oncoy (Peru)

Match rules

- 90 minutes.
- Penalty shoot-out if scores still level.
- Nine named substitutes.
- Maximum of five substitutions.

== Statistics ==
=== Top goalscorers ===
Rank	Player	Team	Goals
1	(Brazil) Victória	(Brazil) Corinthians	6
1	(Colombia) Mariana Zamorano	(Colombia) Santa Fe	6
1	(Brazil) Byanca Brasil	(Brazil) Cruzeiro	6
4	(Brazil) Gabi Zanotti	(Brazil) Corinthians	5
5	(Brazil) Duda Sampaio	(Brazil) Corinthians	4
6	(Uruguay) Alaides Paz	(Argentina) Belgrano	3
6	(Ecuador) Milagro Barahona	(Ecuador) LDU Quito	3
6	(Brazil) Brena	(Brazil) Palmeiras	3
6	(Brazil) Bia Zaneratto	(Brazil) Palmeiras	3
6	(Argentina) Florencia Ceballos	(Argentina) Belgrano	3

Source: Soccerway

== See also ==
- 2025–26 AFC Women's Champions League
- 2026 CAF Women's Champions League
- 2025–26 CONCACAF W Champions Cup
- 2026 OFC Women's Champions League
- 2025–26 UEFA Women's Champions League
