= 2025 Campeonato Brasileiro de Futebol Feminino Série A1 =

Campeonato Brasileiro de Futebol Feminino Série A1
- Season: 2025
- Dates: 22 March – 14 September 2025
- Champions: Corinthians (7th title)
- Relegated: 3B da Amazônia; Sport
- Copa Libertadores: Corinthians; Cruzeiro
- Matches: 134
- Goals: 407 (3.04 per match)
- Top goalscorer: Amanda Gutierres (17 goals)
- Biggest home win: São Paulo 8–0 3B da Amazônia; Group stage, R2, 27 March; Corinthians 8–0 3B da Amazônia; Group stage, R6, 19 April
- Biggest away win: Real Brasília 2–8 Corinthians; Group stage, R1, 24 March
- Highest scoring: 10 goals Real Brasília 2–8 Corinthians; Group stage, R1, 24 March

The 2025 Campeonato Brasileiro Feminino A1 was the 13th season of the Campeonato Brasileiro de Futebol Feminino Série A1, the top level of women's football in Brazil, and the 9th edition in a Série A1 since its establishment in 2016. The tournament was organized by the Brazilian Football Confederation (CBF). It started on 22 March and ended on 14 September 2025.

Sixteen teams competed in the league – the top twelve teams from the previous season, as well as four teams promoted from the 2024 Série A2 (3B da Amazônia, Bahia, Juventude and Sport)

In the finals, defending champions Corinthians won their 7th title and 6th in a row after defeating Cruzeiro 3–2 on aggregate.

== Format ==
In the group stage, each team played once against the other fifteen teams. Top eight teams qualified for the final stages. Quarter-finals, semi-finals and finals were played on a home-and-away two-legged basis.

== Teams ==
Location of teams in 2025 Série A1 outside the state of São Paulo (in red).
Location of teams in 2025 Série A1 within the state of São Paulo.

Pos.	Relegated from 2024 Série A1
13	Botafogo
14	Santos
15	Avaí
16	Atlético Mineiro

Pos.	Promoted from 2024 Série A2
1	Bahia
2	3B da Amazônia
3	Juventude
4	Sport

=== Number of teams by state ===
Number of teams	State	Team(s)
5	São Paulo	Corinthians, Ferroviária, Palmeiras, Red Bull Bragantino and São Paulo
3	Rio Grande do Sul	Grêmio, Internacional and Juventude
2	Minas Gerais	América Mineiro and Cruzeiro
2	Rio de Janeiro	Flamengo and Fluminense
1	Amazonas	3B da Amazônia
1	Bahia	Bahia
1	Distrito Federal	Real Brasília
1	Pernambuco	Sport

== Stadiums and locations ==
Team	Location	Stadium	Capacity
(Amazonas (Brazilian state)) 3B da Amazônia	Manaus	Arena da Amazônia	42,924
(Minas Gerais) América Mineiro	Belo Horizonte	Arena Independência	23,018
Bahia	Salvador	Joia da Princesa (Feira de Santana)	16,274
(São Paulo (state)) Corinthians	São Paulo	Parque São Jorge	18,500
(São Paulo (state)) Corinthians	São Paulo	Neo Química Arena	47,605
(Minas Gerais) Cruzeiro	Belo Horizonte	Castor Cifuentes (Nova Lima)	5,160
(São Paulo (state)) Ferroviária	Araraquara	Fonte Luminosa	21,441
(Rio de Janeiro (state)) Flamengo	Rio de Janeiro	Luso Brasileiro	4,697
(Rio de Janeiro (state)) Fluminense	Rio de Janeiro	Moça Bonita	9,024
(Rio Grande do Sul) Grêmio	Porto Alegre	Aírton Ferreira da Silva (Eldorado do Sul)	1,500
(Rio Grande do Sul) Internacional	Porto Alegre	SESC Protásio Alves	2,800
(Rio Grande do Sul) Juventude	Caxias do Sul	Montanha dos Vinhedos (Bento Gonçalves)	15,269
(São Paulo (state)) Palmeiras	São Paulo	Arena Barueri (Barueri)	31,452
(Federal District (Brazil)) Real Brasília	Brasília	Bezerrão (Gama)	20,310
(São Paulo (state)) Red Bull Bragantino	Bragança Paulista	Gabriel Marques da Silva (Santana de Parnaíba)	7,220
(São Paulo (state)) São Paulo	São Paulo	Marcelo Portugal Gouvêa (Cotia)	2,000
(Pernambuco) Sport	Recife	Arena Pernambuco (São Lourenço da Mata)	45,440

== Personnel and kits ==
Team	Head coach	Captain	Kit manufacturer	Shirt main sponsor
3B da Amazônia	(Brazil) Wendell Coelho	(Brazil) Gabi Batista	Soft Malhas	Prefeitura de Manaus; Governo do Amazonas
América Mineiro	(Brazil) Jorge Victor	(Brazil) Mimi	Volt Sport	
Bahia	(Brazil) Felipe Freitas	(Brazil) Cássia	Puma	Viva Sorte Bet
Corinthians	(Brazil) Lucas Piccinato	(Brazil) Gabi Zanotti	Nike	Esporte da Sorte
Cruzeiro	(Brazil) Jonas Urias	(Brazil) Gaby Soares	Adidas	Gerdau, Neutrox
Ferroviária	(Brazil) Léo Mendes	(Brazil) Duda Santos	Lupo Sport	Galera.bet, Estrella Galicia, Hopi Hari, Qista
Flamengo	(Brazil) Rosana	(Brazil) Djeni	Adidas	PixBet, SESC
Fluminense	(Brazil) Hoffmann Túlio	(Brazil) Gislaine	Umbro	Superbet, Fecomércio RJ
Grêmio	(Brazil) Cyro Leães	(Brazil) Tayla	Umbro	Alfa
Internacional	(Brazil) Maurício Salgado	(Brazil) Bruna Benites	Adidas	Alfa
Juventude	(Brazil) Luciano Brandalise	(Brazil) Bruna Emília	19treze (club manufactured kit)	Stake
Palmeiras	(Brazil) Camilla Orlando	(Brazil) Poliana	Puma	Sportingbet
Real Brasília	(Brazil) Dedê Ramos	(Venezuela) Petra Cabrera	Tolledo Sports	Banco BRB
Red Bull Bragantino	(Brazil) Humberto Simão	(Brazil) Stella	Puma	Red Bull
São Paulo	(Brazil) Thiago Viana	(Brazil) Aline Milene	New Balance	Superbet, BIS
Sport	(Brazil) Regiane Santos	(Brazil) Nanda	Umbro	

=== Managerial changes ===
Team	Outgoing manager	Manner of departure	Date of vacancy	Position in table	Replaced by	Date of appointment
3B da Amazônia	(Brazil) Roberto Neves	Mutual agreement	9 April 2025	16th	(Portugal) Paulo Morgado	10 April 2025
Internacional	(Brazil) Jorge Barcellos	Sacked	18 April 2025	14th	(Brazil) Maurício Salgado ^{1}	27 April 2025
Flamengo	(Brazil) Maurício Salgado	Sacked	22 April 2025	9th	(Brazil) Rosana	22 April 2025
3B da Amazônia	(Portugal) Paulo Morgado	Mutual agreement	28 April 2025	16th	(Brazil) Wendell Coelho ^{2}	5 May 2025
Grêmio	(Brazil) Thaissan Passos	Mutual agreement	2 June 2025	10th	(Brazil) Cyro Leães ^{3}	10 June 2025
Ferroviária	(Brazil) Jéssica de Lima	Sacked	20 June 2025	N/A	(Brazil) Léo Mendes	26 June 2025

Interim managers

1. (Brazil) Luiz Rodrigo and (Brazil) David Júnior were interim managers in the 6th–9th rounds.
2. (Brazil) Bosco Brasil Bindá was interim manager in the 8th–9th rounds.
3. (Brazil) Gisele Ramos was interim manager in the 13th round.

== Group stage ==
In the group stage, each team played on a single round-robin tournament. The top eight teams advanced to the quarter-finals of the knockout stages. The teams were ranked according to points (3 points for a win, 1 point for a draw, and 0 points for a loss). If tied on points, the following criteria would be used to determine the ranking: 1. Wins; 2. Goal difference; 3. Goals scored; 4. Fewest red cards; 5. Fewest yellow cards; 6. Draw in the headquarters of the Brazilian Football Confederation (Regulations Article 16).

=== Group A ===
Pos	Team	Pld	W	D	L	GF	GA	GD	Pts	Qualification or relegation
1	Cruzeiro	15	11	3	1	35	15	+20	36	Advance to Quarter-finals
2	Corinthians	15	10	4	1	46	12	+34	34	Advance to Quarter-finals
3	São Paulo	15	10	3	2	31	10	+21	33	Advance to Quarter-finals
4	Palmeiras	15	9	3	3	38	20	+18	30	Advance to Quarter-finals
5	Flamengo	15	8	3	4	31	19	+12	27	Advance to Quarter-finals
6	Ferroviária	15	7	4	4	24	16	+8	25	Advance to Quarter-finals
7	Bahia	15	7	3	5	26	22	+4	24	Advance to Quarter-finals
8	Red Bull Bragantino	15	5	5	5	20	16	+4	20	Advance to Quarter-finals
9	América Mineiro	15	5	4	6	18	20	−2	19	
10	Fluminense	15	4	6	5	18	20	−2	18	
11	Grêmio	15	3	8	4	23	21	+2	17	
12	Internacional	15	3	5	7	17	29	−12	14	
13	Real Brasília	15	3	3	9	15	36	−21	12	
14	Juventude	15	2	4	9	10	27	−17	10	
15	3B da Amazônia (R)	15	2	1	12	11	53	−42	7	Relegation to Campeonato Brasileiro Série A2
16	Sport (R)	15	0	3	12	9	36	−27	3	Relegation to Campeonato Brasileiro Série A2

Source: CBF
(R) Relegated

=== Results ===
Home \ Away	3BA	AME	BAH	COR	CRU	FER	FLA	FLU	GRE	INT	JUV	PAL	RBR	RED	SAO	SPO
3B da Amazônia		0–3	0–4			0–1		0–1			2–1		2–2			2–1
América Mineiro			1–1	0–1	0–3	1–0		3–1	0–0			1–2				
Bahia						3–1	3–3	2–1			2–2		2–0	1–0	1–2	
Corinthians	8–0		5–1		4–2		1–0		2–0		2–0	1–2				4–0
Cruzeiro	5–1		1–0			3–1	1–1		4–3		4–0			2–1		1–1
Ferroviária				1–1			1–2			2–1	2–0		3–2	0–0	1–0	7–0
Flamengo	5–1	3–0								4–1	2–0	2–5	4–0		0–1	
Fluminense				1–1	1–2	1–1	1–2		1–1	0–0			2–1			
Grêmio	4–0		1–0			1–1	1–1			2–2	3–1			1–1	1–2	
Internacional	1–0	3–2	2–3	0–5	1–2							2–2	1–0			2–2
Juventude		1–1						1–2		1–1		0–4		1–0	0–1	1–0
Palmeiras	4–2		3–1		0–1	1–2		4–2	3–3					0–0	1–2	
Real Brasília		1–1		2–8	0–3				2–1		1–1	0–2		2–1		
Red Bull Bragantino	5–1	2–0		2–2			2–0	2–2		3–0					0–4	1–0
São Paulo	8–0	1–3		1–1	1–1			0–0		1–0			5–0			2–1
Sport		1–2	0–2				1–2	0–2	1–1			1–5	0–2			

Source: CBF
Legend: Blue = home team win; Yellow = draw; Red = away team win.

== Final stages ==
Starting from the quarter-finals, the teams played a single-elimination tournament with the following rules:

- Quarter-finals, semi-finals and finals were played on a home-and-away two-legged basis, with the higher-seeded team hosting the second leg.
  - If tied on aggregate, the penalty shoot-out would be used to determine the winners (Regulations Article 17).
- Extra time would not be played and away goals rule would not be used in final stages.

Starting from the semi-finals, the teams were seeded according to their performance in the tournament. The teams were ranked according to overall points. If tied on overall points, the following criteria would be used to determine the ranking: 1. Overall wins; 2. Overall goal difference; 3. Overall goals scored; 4. Overall fewest red cards; 5. Overall fewest yellow cards; 6. Draw in the headquarters of the Brazilian Football Confederation (Regulations Article 22).

=== Bracket ===
Quarter-finals
(Rio de Janeiro (state)) Flamengo	3	0	3
(São Paulo (state)) Palmeiras	2	3	5
(São Paulo (state)) Red Bull Bragantino	0	0	0
(Minas Gerais) Cruzeiro	0	2	2
(São Paulo (state)) Ferroviária	0	1	1 (2)
(São Paulo (state)) São Paulo (p)	0	1	1 (4)
Bahia	1	0	1
(São Paulo (state)) Corinthians	2	2	4

Semi-finals
(São Paulo (state)) Palmeiras	1	2	3
(Minas Gerais) Cruzeiro	3	1	4
(São Paulo (state)) São Paulo	0	2	2
(São Paulo (state)) Corinthians	2	2	4

Final
(Minas Gerais) Cruzeiro	2	0	2
(São Paulo (state)) Corinthians	2	1	3

=== Quarter-finals ===
Team 1	Agg.	Team 2	1st leg	2nd leg
Red Bull Bragantino (São Paulo (state))	0–2	(Minas Gerais) Cruzeiro	0–0	0–2
Bahia	1–4	(São Paulo (state)) Corinthians	1–2	0–2
Ferroviária (São Paulo (state))	1–1 (2–4 p)	(São Paulo (state)) São Paulo	0–0	1–1
Flamengo (Rio de Janeiro (state))	3–5	(São Paulo (state)) Palmeiras	3–2	0–3

==== Group B ====
10 August 2025
10:30

Red Bull Bragantino (São Paulo (state))	0–0	(Minas Gerais) Cruzeiro
	Report

Estádio do Canindé, São Paulo
Referee: Deborah Cecilia Cruz Correia (Pernambuco)

17 August 2025
10:30

Cruzeiro (Minas Gerais)	2–0	(São Paulo (state)) Red Bull Bragantino
Letícia Ferreira 52'; Gisseli 68'	Report

Arena Independência, Belo Horizonte
Referee: Rejane Caetano da Silva (Rio de Janeiro)

Cruzeiro won 2–0 on aggregate and advanced to the semi-finals.

==== Group C ====
9 August 2025
18:00

Bahia	1–2	(São Paulo (state)) Corinthians
Rhaizza 83'	Report	Gi Fernandes 33'; Gabi Zanotti 90+6'

Batistão, Aracaju
Referee: Thayslane de Melo Costa (Sergipe)

15 August 2025
21:00

Corinthians (São Paulo (state))	2–0	Bahia
Érika 21'; Duda Sampaio 90+1'	Report

Mercado Livre Arena Pacaembu, São Paulo
Referee: Deborah Cecilia Cruz Correia (Pernambuco)

Corinthians won 4–1 on aggregate and advanced to the semi-finals.

==== Group D ====
9 August 2025
15:30

Ferroviária (São Paulo (state))	0–0	(São Paulo (state)) São Paulo
	Report

Fonte Luminosa, Araraquara
Referee: Daiane Muniz (São Paulo)

16 August 2025
16:00

São Paulo (São Paulo (state))	1–1	(São Paulo (state)) Ferroviária
Giovanna Crivelari 50'	Report	Mylena Carioca 20'
Penalties
Jéssica Soares (penalty scored); Kaká (penalty scored); Bruna Calderan (penalty scored); Maressa (penalty scored)	4–2	(penalty scored) Camila Silva; (penalty missed) Mariana Santos; (penalty missed) Andressa Pereira; (penalty scored) Fátima Dutra

MorumBIS, São Paulo
Referee: Edina Alves Batista (São Paulo)

Tied 1–1 on aggregate, São Paulo won on penalties and advanced to the semi-finals.

==== Group E ====
10 August 2025
10:30

Flamengo (Rio de Janeiro (state))	3–2	(São Paulo (state)) Palmeiras
Djeni 36', 77'; Jucinara 45+4'	Report	Tainá Maranhão 56', 65'

Estádio Raulino de Oliveira, Volta Redonda
Referee: Charly Wendy Straub Deretti (Santa Catarina)

17 August 2025
10:30

Palmeiras (São Paulo (state))	3–0	(Rio de Janeiro (state)) Flamengo
Tainá Maranhão 15'; Brena 51'; Amanda Gutierres 90+4'	Report

Arena Barueri, Barueri
Referee: Thayslane de Melo Costa (Sergipe)

Palmeiras won 5–3 on aggregate and advanced to the semi-finals.

=== Semi-finals ===
Pos	Team	Pld	W	D	L	GF	GA	GD	Pts	Host
2	(Minas Gerais) Cruzeiro	17	12	4	1	37	15	+22	40	Second leg
4	(São Paulo (state)) Palmeiras	17	10	3	4	43	23	+20	33	First leg
1	(São Paulo (state)) Corinthians	17	12	4	1	50	13	+37	40	Second leg
3	(São Paulo (state)) São Paulo	17	10	5	2	32	11	+21	35	First leg

Source: CBF

Team 1	Agg.	Team 2	1st leg	2nd leg
Palmeiras (São Paulo (state))	3–4	(Minas Gerais) Cruzeiro	1–3	2–1
São Paulo (São Paulo (state))	2–4	(São Paulo (state)) Corinthians	0–2	2–2

==== Group F ====
24 August 2025
10:30

Palmeiras (São Paulo (state))	1–3	(Minas Gerais) Cruzeiro
Andressinha 37'	Report	Letícia Ferreira 48'; Vanessinha 53'; Gaby Soares 59'

Arena Barueri, Barueri
Referee: Deborah Cecilia Cruz Correia (Pernambuco)

31 August 2025
10:30

Cruzeiro (Minas Gerais)	1–2	(São Paulo (state)) Palmeiras
Marília 65'	Report	Poliana 45+2'; Amanda Gutierres 84'

Arena Independência, Belo Horizonte
Referee: Rejane Caetano da Silva (Rio de Janeiro)

Cruzeiro won 4–3 on aggregate and advanced to the finals.

==== Group G ====
24 August 2025
10:30

São Paulo (São Paulo (state))	0–2	(São Paulo (state)) Corinthians
	Report	Jaqueline 3'; Rodríguez 76'

Mercado Livre Arena Pacaembu, São Paulo
Referee: Daiane Caroline Muniz dos Santos (São Paulo)

31 August 2025
10:30

Corinthians (São Paulo (state))	2–2	(São Paulo (state)) São Paulo
Mariza 26'; Andressa Alves 41'	Report	Aline Milene 35'; Isa Guimarães 62'

Estádio do Canindé, São Paulo
Referee: Marianna Nanni Batalha (São Paulo)

Corinthians won 4–2 on aggregate and advanced to the finals.

=== Finals ===
Pos	Team	Pld	W	D	L	GF	GA	GD	Pts	Host
1	(São Paulo (state)) Corinthians	19	13	5	1	54	15	+39	44	2nd leg
2	(Minas Gerais) Cruzeiro	19	13	4	2	41	18	+23	43	1st leg

Source: CBF

Team 1	Agg.	Team 2	1st leg	2nd leg
Cruzeiro (Minas Gerais)	2–3	(São Paulo (state)) Corinthians	2–2	0–1

==== Group H ====
7 September 2025
10:30

Cruzeiro (Minas Gerais)	2–2	(São Paulo (state)) Corinthians
Marília 27'; Belinha 78'	Report	Gi Fernandes 5'; Gabi Zanotti 74'

Arena Independência, Belo Horizonte
Attendance: 19,175
Referee: Thayslane de Melo Costa (Sergipe)

14 September 2025
10:30

Corinthians (São Paulo (state))	1–0	(Minas Gerais) Cruzeiro
Thaís Ferreira 49'	Report

Neo Química Arena, São Paulo
Attendance: 41,130
Referee: Deborah Cecilia Cruz Correia (Pernambuco)

== Top goalscorers ==
Rank	Player	Club	Goals
1	(Brazil) Amanda Gutierres	Palmeiras	17
2	(Argentina) Paulina Gramaglia	Red Bull Bragantino	10
3	(Brazil) Cristiane	Flamengo	9
3	(Brazil) Letícia Ferreira	Cruzeiro	9
5	(Brazil) Gabi Zanotti	Corinthians	8
5	(Brazil) Jhonson	Corinthians	8
5	(Brazil) Victória	Corinthians	8
8	(Brazil) Giovanna Crivelari	São Paulo	7

Source:CBF
