= Paloma Maciel =

Brazilian professional footballer (born 1999)

Personal information
- Full name: Paloma Maciel
- Date of birth: 23 August 1999 (age 27)
- Place of birth: Três Barras, Brazil
- Height: 1.68 m (5 ft 6 in)
- Positions: Centre-back; defensive midfielder

Team information
- Current team: Cruzeiro
- Number: 4

Youth career
- 2016: Brusque Futsal

Senior career*
Years	Team	Apps	(Gls)
2017	Fluminense do Itaum	4	(3)
2018	Marcílio Dias	6	(0)
2020–2023	Athletico Paranaense	41	(2)
2023–	Cruzeiro	63	(4)

International career^{‡}
2026–	Brazil	1	(0)
- * Club domestic league appearances and goals as of 01:34, 13 April 2026 (UTC) ‡ National team caps and goals as of 01:34, 13 April 2026 (UTC)

Paloma Maciel (born 23 August 1999) is a Brazilian professional footballer who plays as either a centre-back or a defensive midfielder for Cruzeiro and the Brazil national team.

== Club career ==
Born in Três Barras, Santa Catarina, Paloma Maciel began playing professionally with a futsal side in Brusque. She later played with football sides Fluminense do Itaum and Marcílio Dias as a forward, before returning to futsal.

In 2020, after a trial period, Paloma Maciel signed for Athletico Paranaense, where she was moved back to a defensive midfielder position. In September 2023, she moved to Cruzeiro.

On 10 January 2024, Paloma Maciel renewed her contract with the Cabulosas. On 29 October of the following year, already established as a first-choice as a centre-back, she further extended her link until December 2027.

== International career ==
On 25 March 2026, Paloma Maciel was called up to the Brazil national team by head coach Arthur Elias for the 2026 FIFA Series. She made her full international debut on 11 April, coming on as a late substitute for Thaís Ferreira in a 5–1 routing of South Korea at the Arena Pantanal.

== Honours ==
Athletico Paranaense

- Campeonato Paranaense de Futebol Feminino: 2021

Cruzeiro

- Campeonato Mineiro de Futebol Feminino: 2023, 2024, 2025
