= Prêmio Craque do Brasileirão =

Brazilian football award

The Prêmio Craque do Brasileirão (English: Brasileirão Best Player Award) is an award given by the Brazilian Football Confederation (known as CBF) and TV Globo for the best players, head coaches, and referees of the Série A.

== Player of the Year ("Craque do Brasileirão") ==
| Season | Player | Position | Nationality | Club |
|---|---|---|---|---|
| 2005 | Carlos Tevez | Second striker | (Argentina) | Corinthians |
| 2006 | Rogério Ceni | Goalkeeper | (Brazil) | São Paulo |
| 2007 | Rogério Ceni (2) | Goalkeeper | (Brazil) | São Paulo |
| 2008 | Hernanes | Central midfielder | (Brazil) | São Paulo |
| 2009 | Diego Souza | Attacking midfielder | (Brazil) | Palmeiras |
| 2010 | Darío Conca | Attacking midfielder | (Argentina) | Fluminense |
| 2011 | Neymar | Second striker | (Brazil) | Santos |
| 2012 | Fred | Striker | (Brazil) | Fluminense |
| 2013 | Éverton Ribeiro | Right midfielder | (Brazil) | Cruzeiro |
| 2014 | Éverton Ribeiro (2) | Right midfielder | (Brazil) | Cruzeiro |
| 2015 | Renato Augusto | Central midfielder | (Brazil) | Corinthians |
| 2016 | Gabriel Jesus | Forward | (Brazil) | Palmeiras |
| 2017 | Jô | Striker | (Brazil) | Corinthians |
| 2018 | Dudu | Forward | (Brazil) | Palmeiras |
| 2019 | Bruno Henrique | Forward | (Brazil) | Flamengo |
| 2020 | Claudinho | Attacking midfielder | (Brazil) | Red Bull Bragantino |
| 2021 | Hulk | Forward | (Brazil) | Atlético Mineiro |
| 2022 | Gustavo Scarpa | Attacking midfielder | (Brazil) | Palmeiras |
| 2023 | Cancelled | | | |
| 2024 | Luiz Henrique | Winger | (Brazil) | Botafogo |
| 2025 | Giorgian de Arrascaeta | Attacking midfielder | (Uruguay) | Flamengo |

== Team of the Year ==
=== Winners ===
Players marked bold won the "Best Player award" in that respective year.

| Season | Category | | | |
| Season | Goalkeeper | Defenders | Midfielders | Forwards |
|---|---|---|---|---|
| 2005 | (Brazil) Fábio Costa (Corinthians) | (Brazil) Gabriel (Fluminense) (Paraguay) Carlos Gamarra (Palmeiras) (Uruguay) Diego Lugano (São Paulo) (Brazil) Gustavo Nery (Corinthians) | (Brazil) Tinga (Internacional) (Brazil) Marcelo Mattos (Corinthians) (Serbia) Dejan Petković (Fluminense) (Brazil) Roger (Corinthians) | (Argentina) Carlos Tevez (Corinthians) (Brazil) Rafael Sóbis (Internacional) |
| 2006 | (Brazil) Rogério Ceni (São Paulo) | (Brazil) Souza (São Paulo) (Brazil) Fabão (São Paulo) (Brazil) Fabiano Eller (Internacional) (Brazil) Marcelo (Fluminense) | (Brazil) Mineiro (São Paulo) (Brazil) Lucas Leiva (Grêmio) (Brazil) Zé Roberto (Botafogo) (Brazil) Renato Abreu (Flamengo) | (Brazil) Souza (Goiás) (Brazil) Fernandão (Internacional) |
| 2007 | (Brazil) Rogério Ceni (São Paulo) | (Brazil) Léo Moura (Flamengo) (Brazil) Breno (São Paulo) (Brazil) Miranda (São Paulo) (Brazil) Kléber (Santos) | (Brazil) Hernanes (São Paulo) (Brazil) Richarlyson (São Paulo) (Brazil) Ibson (Flamengo) (Chile) Jorge Valdivia (Palmeiras) | (Brazil) Josiel (Paraná) (Uruguay) Alberto Acosta (Náutico) |
| 2008 | (Brazil) Victor (Grêmio) | (Brazil) Léo Moura (Flamengo) (Brazil) Thiago Silva (Fluminense) (Brazil) Miranda (São Paulo) (Brazil) Juan (Flamengo) | (Brazil) Ramires (Cruzeiro) (Brazil) Hernanes (São Paulo) (Brazil) Diego Souza (Palmeiras) (Brazil) Alex (Internacional) | (Brazil) Kléber Pereira (Santos) (Brazil) Alex Mineiro (Palmeiras) |
| 2009 | (Brazil) Victor (Grêmio) | (Brazil) Jonathan (Cruzeiro) (Brazil) André Dias (São Paulo) (Brazil) Miranda (São Paulo) (Brazil) Júlio César (Goiás) | (Brazil) Hernanes (São Paulo) (Argentina) Pablo Guiñazú (Internacional) (Serbia) Dejan Petković (Flamengo) (Brazil) Diego Souza (Palmeiras) | (Brazil) Diego Tardelli (Atlético Mineiro) (Brazil) Adriano (Flamengo) |
| 2010 | (Brazil) Fábio (Cruzeiro) | (Brazil) Mariano (Fluminense) (Brazil) Dedé (Vasco da Gama) (Brazil) Miranda (São Paulo) (Brazil) Roberto Carlos (Corinthians) | (Brazil) Elias (Corinthians) (Brazil) Jucilei (Corinthians) (Argentina) Walter Montillo (Cruzeiro) (Argentina) Darío Conca (Fluminense) | (Brazil) Jonas (Grêmio) (Brazil) Neymar (Santos) |
| 2011 | (Brazil) Jefferson (Botafogo) | (Brazil) Fagner (Vasco da Gama) (Brazil) Dedé (Vasco da Gama) (Brazil) Réver (Atlético Mineiro) (Brazil) Bruno Cortez (Botafogo) | (Brazil) Paulinho (Corinthians) (Brazil) Ralf (Corinthians) (Brazil) Diego Souza (Vasco da Gama) (Brazil) Ronaldinho (Flamengo) | (Brazil) Fred (Fluminense) (Brazil) Neymar (Santos) |
| 2012 | (Brazil) Diego Cavalieri (Fluminense) | (Brazil) Marcos Rocha (Atlético Mineiro) (Brazil) Leonardo Silva (Atlético Mineiro) (Brazil) Réver (Atlético Mineiro) (Brazil) Carlinhos (Fluminense) | (Brazil) Jean (Fluminense) (Brazil) Paulinho (Corinthians) (Brazil) Lucas (São Paulo) (Brazil) Ronaldinho (Flamengo, Atlético Mineiro) | (Brazil) Fred (Fluminense) (Brazil) Neymar (Santos) |
| 2013 | (Brazil) Fábio (Cruzeiro) | (Brazil) Marcos Rocha (Atlético Mineiro) (Brazil) Dedé (Cruzeiro) (Brazil) Manoel (Atlético Paranaense) (Brazil) Alex Telles (Grêmio) | (Brazil) Elias (Flamengo) (Brazil) Nílton (Cruzeiro) (Brazil) Éverton Ribeiro (Cruzeiro) (Brazil) Paulo Baier (Atlético Paranaense) | (Brazil) Walter (Goiás) (Brazil) Éderson (Atlético Paranaense) |
| 2014 | (Brazil) Jefferson (Botafogo) | (Brazil) Marcos Rocha (Atlético Mineiro) (Brazil) Dedé (Cruzeiro) (Brazil) Gil (Corinthians) (Brazil) Egídio (Cruzeiro) | (Brazil) Souza (São Paulo) (Brazil) Lucas Silva (Cruzeiro) (Brazil) Éverton Ribeiro (Cruzeiro) (Brazil) Ricardo Goulart (Cruzeiro) | (Brazil) Diego Tardelli (Atlético Mineiro) (Peru) Paolo Guerrero (Corinthians) |
| 2015 | (Brazil) Cássio (Corinthians) | (Brazil) Marcos Rocha (Atlético Mineiro) (Brazil) Gil (Corinthians) (Brazil) Jemerson (Atlético Mineiro) (Brazil) Douglas Santos (Atlético Mineiro) | (Brazil) Elias (Corinthians) (Brazil) Rafael Carioca (Atlético Mineiro) (Brazil) Jádson (Corinthians) (Brazil) Renato Augusto (Corinthians) | (Brazil) Ricardo Oliveira (Santos) (Brazil) Luan (Grêmio) |
| 2016 | (Brazil) Jailson (Palmeiras) | (Brazil) Jean (Palmeiras) (Brazil) Pedro Geromel (Grêmio) (Colombia) Yerry Mina (Palmeiras) (Brazil) Jorge (Flamengo) | (Brazil) Moisés (Palmeiras) (Brazil) Tchê Tchê (Palmeiras) (Brazil) Diego (Flamengo) | (Brazil) Robinho (Atlético Mineiro) (Brazil) Gabriel Jesus (Palmeiras) (Brazil) Dudu (Palmeiras) |
| 2017 | (Brazil) Vanderlei (Santos) | (Brazil) Fagner (Corinthians) (Brazil) Pedro Geromel (Grêmio) (Paraguay) Fabián Balbuena (Corinthians) (Brazil) Guilherme Arana (Corinthians) | (Brazil) Bruno Silva (Botafogo) (Brazil) Arthur (Grêmio) (Brazil) Hernanes (São Paulo) (Brazil) Thiago Neves (Cruzeiro) | (Brazil) Henrique Dourado (Fluminense) (Brazil) Jô (Corinthians) |
| 2018 | (Brazil) Marcelo Lomba (Internacional) | (Brazil) Mayke (Palmeiras) (Brazil) Pedro Geromel (Grêmio) (Argentina) Víctor Cuesta (Internacional) (Brazil) Renê (Flamengo) | (Uruguay) Giorgian de Arrascaeta (Cruzeiro) (Brazil) Rodrigo Dourado (Internacional) (Brazil) Bruno Henrique (Palmeiras) (Brazil) Lucas Paquetá (Flamengo) | (Brazil) Gabriel Barbosa (Santos) (Brazil) Dudu (Palmeiras) |
| 2019 | (Brazil) Santos (Atlético Paranaense) | (Brazil) Rafinha (Flamengo) (Brazil) Rodrigo Caio (Flamengo) (Spain) Pablo Marí (Flamengo) (Brazil) Filipe Luís (Flamengo) | (Uruguay) Giorgian de Arrascaeta (Flamengo) (Brazil) Gerson (Flamengo) (Brazil) Bruno Guimarães (Atlético Paranaense) (Brazil) Éverton Ribeiro (Flamengo) | (Brazil) Gabriel Barbosa (Flamengo) (Brazil) Bruno Henrique (Flamengo) |
| 2020 | (Brazil) Weverton (Palmeiras) | (Brazil) Fagner (Corinthians) (Paraguay) Gustavo Gómez (Palmeiras) (Argentina) Víctor Cuesta (Internacional) (Brazil) Guilherme Arana (Atlético Mineiro) | (Brazil) Edenílson (Internacional) (Brazil) Gerson (Flamengo) (Brazil) Vina (Ceará) (Brazil) Claudinho (Red Bull Bragantino) | (Brazil) Gabriel Barbosa (Flamengo) (Brazil) Marinho (Santos) |
| 2021 | (Brazil) Weverton (Palmeiras) | (Brazil) Yago Pikachu (Fortaleza) (Paraguay) Gustavo Gómez (Palmeiras) (Paraguay) Júnior Alonso (Atlético Mineiro) (Brazil) Guilherme Arana (Atlético Mineiro) | (Brazil) Edenílson (Internacional) (Brazil) Jair (Atlético Mineiro) (Brazil) Raphael Veiga (Palmeiras) (Argentina) Nacho Fernández (Atlético Mineiro) | (Brazil) Hulk (Atlético Mineiro) (Brazil) Michael (Flamengo) |
| 2022 | (Brazil) Weverton (Palmeiras) | (Brazil) Marcos Rocha (Palmeiras) (Paraguay) Gustavo Gómez (Palmeiras) (Brazil) Murilo (Palmeiras) (Uruguay) Joaquín Piquerez (Palmeiras) | (Brazil) André (Fluminense) (Brazil) João Gomes (Flamengo) (Brazil) Gustavo Scarpa (Palmeiras) (Uruguay) Giorgian de Arrascaeta (Flamengo) | (Argentina) Germán Cano (Fluminense) (Brazil) Pedro Raul (Goiás) |
| 2023 | Cancelled | | | |
| 2024 | (Brazil) John (Botafogo) | (Brazil) Wesley (Flamengo) (Argentina) Alexander Barboza (Botafogo) (Angola) Bastos (Botafogo) (Argentina) Alexandro Bernabei (Internacional) | (Brazil) Gerson (Flamengo) (Brazil) Marlon Freitas (Botafogo) (Argentina) Rodrigo Garro (Corinthians) (Brazil) Alan Patrick (Internacional) | (Brazil) Luiz Henrique (Botafogo) (Brazil) Estêvão (Palmeiras) |
| 2025 | (Argentina) Agustín Rossi (Flamengo) | (Brazil) Paulo Henrique (Vasco da Gama) (Brazil) Fabrício Bruno (Cruzeiro) (Brazil) Léo Pereira (Flamengo) (Brazil) Reinaldo (Mirassol) | (Italy) Jorginho (Flamengo) (Argentina) Lucas Romero (Cruzeiro) (Uruguay) Giorgian de Arrascaeta (Flamengo) (Brazil) Matheus Pereira (Cruzeiro) | (Brazil) Kaio Jorge (Cruzeiro) (Brazil) Vitor Roque (Palmeiras) |

=== Most appearances ===
| Player | Position | Apps | Years | Club(s) |
|---|---|---|---|---|
| (Brazil) Marcos Rocha | DF | 5 | 2012, 2013, 2014, 2015, 2022 | Atlético Mineiro, Palmeiras |
| (Brazil) Miranda | DF | 4 | 2007, 2008, 2009, 2010 | São Paulo |
| (Brazil) Hernanes | MF | 4 | 2007, 2008, 2009, 2017 | São Paulo |
| (Brazil) Dedé | DF | 4 | 2010, 2011, 2013, 2014 | Vasco da Gama, Cruzeiro |
| (Uruguay) Giorgian de Arrascaeta | MF | 4 | 2018, 2019, 2022, 2025 | Cruzeiro, Flamengo |
| (Brazil) Diego Souza | MF | 3 | 2008, 2009, 2011 | Palmeiras, Vasco da Gama |
| (Brazil) Neymar | FW | 3 | 2010, 2011, 2012 | Santos |
| (Brazil) Elias | MF | 3 | 2010, 2013, 2015 | Corinthians, Flamengo |
| (Brazil) Éverton Ribeiro | MF | 3 | 2013, 2014, 2019 | Cruzeiro, Flamengo |
| (Brazil) Fagner | DF | 3 | 2011, 2017, 2020 | Vasco da Gama, Corinthians |
| (Brazil) Gabriel Barbosa | FW | 3 | 2018, 2019, 2020 | Santos, Flamengo |
| (Brazil) Guilherme Arana | DF | 3 | 2017, 2020, 2021 | Corinthians, Atlético Mineiro |
| (Brazil) Weverton | GK | 3 | 2020, 2021, 2022 | Palmeiras |
| (Paraguay) Gustavo Gómez | DF | 3 | 2020, 2021, 2022 | Palmeiras |
| (Brazil) Gerson | MF | 3 | 2019, 2020, 2024 | Flamengo |

== Additional categories ==
=== Best Fan's Player ("Craque da Galera") ===
| Season | Player | Team |
|---|---|---|
| 2006 | (Brazil) Renato Abreu | Flamengo |
| 2007 | (Brazil) Rogério Ceni | São Paulo |
| 2008 | (Brazil) Thiago Silva | Fluminense |
| 2009 | (Argentina) Darío Conca | Fluminense |
| 2010 | (Argentina) Darío Conca | Fluminense |
| 2011 | (Brazil) Dedé | Vasco da Gama |
| 2012 | (Brazil) Ronaldinho | Atlético Mineiro |
| 2013 | (Brazil) Hernane | Flamengo |
| 2014 | (Brazil) Rogério Ceni | São Paulo |
| 2015 | (Brazil) Nenê | Vasco da Gama |
| 2016 | (Brazil) Danilo | Chapecoense |
| 2017 | (Brazil) Hernanes | São Paulo |
| 2018 | (Colombia) Gustavo Cuéllar | Flamengo |
| 2019 | (Brazil) Éverton Ribeiro | Flamengo |
| 2020 | (Brazil) Gabriel Barbosa | Flamengo |
| 2021 | (Brazil) Michael | Flamengo |
| 2022 | (Argentina) Germán Cano | Fluminense |
| 2023 | Cancelled | |
| 2024 | (Argentina) Rodrigo Garro | Corinthians |

=== Top goalscorer ===
| Season | Player | Team | Goals |
|---|---|---|---|
| 1998 | (Brazil) Viola | Santos | 21 |
| 2005 | (Brazil) Romário | Vasco da Gama | 22 |
| 2006 | (Brazil) Souza | Goiás | 17 |
| 2007 | (Brazil) Josiel | Paraná | 20 |
| 2008 | (Brazil) Keirrison | Coritiba | 21 |
| 2008 | (Brazil) Kléber Pereira | Santos | 21 |
| 2008 | (Brazil) Washington | Fluminense | 21 |
| 2009 | (Brazil) Adriano | Flamengo | 19 |
| 2009 | (Brazil) Diego Tardelli | Atlético Mineiro | 19 |
| 2010 | (Brazil) Jonas | Grêmio | 23 |
| 2011 | (Brazil) Borges | Santos | 23 |
| 2012 | (Brazil) Fred | Fluminense | 20 |
| 2013 | (Brazil) Éderson | Atlético Paranaense | 21 |
| 2014 | (Brazil) Fred | Fluminense | 18 |
| 2015 | (Brazil) Ricardo Oliveira | Santos | 20 |
| 2016 | (Brazil) Diego Souza | Sport Recife | 14 |
| 2016 | (Brazil) Fred | Atlético Mineiro | 14 |
| 2016 | (Brazil) William Pottker | Ponte Preta | 14 |
| 2017 | (Brazil) Henrique Dourado | Fluminense | 18 |
| 2017 | (Brazil) Jô | Corinthians | 18 |
| 2018 | (Brazil) Gabriel Barbosa | Santos | 18 |
| 2019 | (Brazil) Gabriel Barbosa | Flamengo | 25 |
| 2020 | (Brazil) Claudinho | Red Bull Bragantino | 18 |
| 2020 | (Brazil) Luciano | São Paulo | 18 |
| 2021 | (Brazil) Hulk | Atlético Mineiro | 19 |
| 2022 | (Argentina) Germán Cano | Fluminense | 26 |
| 2023 | Cancelled | | |
| 2024 | Not awarded | | |
| 2025 | (Brazil) Kaio Jorge | Cruzeiro | 21 |

=== Best Newcomer ===
| Season | Player | Team | Age |
|---|---|---|---|
| 1998 | (Brazil) Fábio Júnior | Cruzeiro | 21 |
| 2007 | (Brazil) Breno | São Paulo | 18 |
| 2008 | (Brazil) Keirrison | Coritiba | 20 |
| 2009 | (Brazil) Fernandinho | Grêmio Barueri | 24 |
| 2010 | (Brazil) Bruno César | Corinthians | 22 |
| 2011 | (Brazil) Wellington Nem | Figueirense | 19 |
| 2012 | (Brazil) Bernard | Atlético Mineiro | 20 |
| 2013 | (Brazil) Marcelo Cirino | Atlético Paranaense | 21 |
| 2014 | (Brazil) Erik | Goiás | 20 |
| 2015 | (Brazil) Gabriel Jesus | Palmeiras | 18 |
| 2016 | (Brazil) Vitor Bueno | Santos | 22 |
| 2017 | (Brazil) Arthur | Grêmio | 21 |
| 2018 | (Brazil) Pedro | Fluminense | 21 |
| 2019 | (Brazil) Michael | Goiás | 23 |
| 2020 | (Brazil) Claudinho | Red Bull Bragantino | 24 |
| 2021 | (Brazil) André | Fluminense | 20 |
| 2022 | (Brazil) Endrick | Palmeiras | 16 |
| 2023 | Cancelled | | |
| 2024 | (Brazil) Estêvão | Palmeiras | 17 |
| 2025 | (Brazil) Rayan | Vasco da Gama | 19 |

=== Best Foreign Player ===
| Season | Player | Team |
|---|---|---|
| 2015 | (Argentina) Lucas Pratto | Atlético Mineiro |

=== Most Beautiful Goal ===
| Season | Player | Team | Against | Venue | Date | Round | Minute |
|---|---|---|---|---|---|---|---|
| 2015 | (Brazil) Lucca | Corinthians | São Paulo | Arena de Itaquera | 22 November 2015 | Round 36 | 61' |
| 2016 | (Brazil) Zé Roberto | Palmeiras | Santa Cruz | Arruda | 3 October 2016 | Round 28 | 33' |
| 2017 | (Brazil) Hernanes | São Paulo | Ponte Preta | Morumbi | 9 September 2017 | Round 23 | 34' |
| 2018 | (Brazil) Éverton Ribeiro | Flamengo | Cruzeiro | Mineirão | 25 November 2018 | Round 37 | 8' |
| 2019 | (Uruguay) Giorgian de Arrascaeta | Flamengo | Ceará | Castelão | 25 August 2019 | Round 16 | 90+6' |
| 2020 | (Brazil) Éverton Ribeiro | Flamengo | Fortaleza | Maracanã | 5 September 2020 | Round 8 | 5' |
| 2021 | (Brazil) Michael | Flamengo | Chapecoense | Maracanã | 11 July 2021 | Round 11 | 81' |
| 2022 | (Brazil) Rony | Palmeiras | Fluminense | Maracanã | 27 August 2022 | Round 24 | 8' |
| 2023 | Cancelled | | | | | | |
| 2024 | (Brazil) Alerrandro | Vitória | Cruzeiro | Barradão | 19 August 2024 | Round 23 | 28' |
| 2025 | (Brazil) Pedro | Flamengo | Vitória | Maracanã | 25 August 2025 | Round 21 | 58' |

=== Most Beautiful Save ===
| Season | Player | Team |
|---|---|---|
| 2017 | (Brazil) Vanderlei | Santos |

=== Fair Play award ===
| Season | Team |
|---|---|
| 2013 | Vitória |
| 2014 | Atlético Paranaense |
| 2015 | Corinthians |
| 2017 | Grêmio |
| 2018 | Corinthians |
| 2019 | Corinthians |
| 2020 | Atlético Mineiro |
| 2021 | Corinthians |

=== Most Supporting Fans ===
| Season | Team |
|---|---|
| 2007 | Flamengo |
| 2008 | Corinthians |
| 2009 | Flamengo |
| 2010 | Bahia |
| 2017 | Sport Recife |

=== Best Referee ===
| Season | Winner |
|---|---|
| 1998 | Sidrack Marinho |
| 2005 | Leonardo Gaciba |
| 2006 | Leonardo Gaciba |
| 2007 | Leonardo Gaciba |
| 2008 | Leonardo Gaciba |
| 2009 | Héber Roberto Lopes |
| 2010 | Sandro Ricci |
| 2011 | Sandro Ricci |
| 2012 | Nielson Nogueira Dias |
| 2013 | Paulo César de Oliveira |
| 2014 | Ricardo Marques |
| 2015 | Anderson Daronco |
| 2016 | Raphael Claus |
| 2017 | Raphael Claus |
| 2018 | Raphael Claus |
| 2019 | Wilton Sampaio |
| 2020 | Leandro Vuaden |
| 2021 | Bruno Arleu |
| 2022–2024 | Not awarded |
| 2025 | Rodrigo Pereira de Lima; Bruno Boschilia (assistant); Rafael da Silva Alves (assistant); Caio Max Augusto Vieira (VAR); Déborah Correia; Leila Naiara (assistant); Maira Moreira (assistant); Hellen Gonçalves Silva (VAR); Charly Deretti (VAR); Amanda Matias (VAR) |

== Coaching awards ==
=== Best Coach ===
| Season | Coach | Team |
|---|---|---|
| 2005 | (Brazil) Muricy Ramalho | Internacional |
| 2006 | (Brazil) Muricy Ramalho | São Paulo |
| 2007 | (Brazil) Muricy Ramalho | São Paulo |
| 2008 | (Brazil) Muricy Ramalho | São Paulo |
| 2009 | (Brazil) Andrade | Flamengo |
| 2010 | (Brazil) Muricy Ramalho | Fluminense |
| 2011 | (Brazil) Ricardo Gomes | Vasco da Gama |
| 2011 | (Brazil) Cristóvão Borges | Vasco da Gama |
| 2012 | (Brazil) Abel Braga | Fluminense |
| 2013 | (Brazil) Marcelo Oliveira | Cruzeiro |
| 2014 | (Brazil) Marcelo Oliveira | Cruzeiro |
| 2015 | (Brazil) Tite | Corinthians |
| 2016 | (Brazil) Cuca | Palmeiras |
| 2017 | (Brazil) Fábio Carille | Corinthians |
| 2018 | (Brazil) Luiz Felipe Scolari | Palmeiras |
| 2019 | (Portugal) Jorge Jesus | Flamengo |
| 2020 | (Brazil) Abel Braga | Internacional |
| 2021 | (Brazil) Cuca | Atlético Mineiro |
| 2022 | (Portugal) Abel Ferreira | Palmeiras |
| 2023 | Cancelled | |
| 2024 | (Portugal) Artur Jorge | Botafogo |
| 2025 | (Brazil) Rafael Guanaes | Mirassol |

=== Breakthrough Coach ===
| Season | Coach | Team |
|---|---|---|
| 2016 | (Brazil) Jair Ventura | Botafogo |
| 2017 | (Brazil) Fábio Carille | Corinthians |

== Tribute ==
| Season | Winner |
|---|---|
| 2005 | (Brazil) Zagallo |
| 2006 | (Brazil) Djalma Santos |
| 2007 | (Brazil) Nílton Santos (Brazil) Romário (Vasco da Gama) |
| 2017 | (Brazil) Zagallo |

== Hosts ==
| Year | Host |
|---|---|
| 2005 | Theatro Municipal |
| 2006 | Theatro Municipal |
| 2007 | Theatro Municipal |
| 2008 | Vivo Rio |
| 2009 | Vivo Rio |
| 2010 | Theatro Municipal |
| 2011 | Auditório Ibirapuera |
| 2012 | HSBC Brasil, São Paulo |
| 2019 | Píer Mauá, Rio de Janeiro |
| 2020 | CBF headquarters, Rio de Janeiro |
| 2021 | CBF headquarters, Rio de Janeiro |
| 2024 | No awards ceremony, published online |
| 2025 | Roxy Dinner Show, Rio de Janeiro |

== Women's football ==
From the 2021 season onwards, the awards given for the male players by the CBF, were also given for the best players of the Campeonato Brasileiro de Futebol Feminino Série A1, using the same criteria as of for male players.

=== Best player ===
| Season | Player | Position | Nationality | Club |
|---|---|---|---|---|
| 2021 | Bia Zaneratto | Forward | (Brazil) | Palmeiras |
| 2022 | Duda Sampaio | Attacking midfielder | (Brazil) | Internacional |
| 2023–2024 | Not awarded | | | |
| 2025 | Gabi Zanotti | Attacking midfielder | (Brazil) | Corinthians |

=== Team of the year ===
| Season | Category | | | |
| Season | Goalkeeper | Defenders | Midfielders | Forwards |
|---|---|---|---|---|
| 2021 | (Brazil) Luciana (Ferroviária) | (Brazil) Bruna Calderan (Palmeiras) (Argentina) Agustina Barroso (Palmeiras) (Brazil) Érika (Corinthians) (Brazil) Yasmim (Corinthians) | (Brazil) Ingryd (Corinthians) (Brazil) Julia Bianchi (Palmeiras) (Brazil) Gabi Zanotti (Corinthians) (Brazil) Tamires (Corinthians) | (Brazil) Bia Zaneratto (Palmeiras) (Brazil) Adriana (Corinthians) |
| 2022 | (Brazil) Lorena (Grêmio) | (Brazil) Fe Palermo (São Paulo) (Brazil) Sorriso (Internacional) (Brazil) Tarciane (Corinthians) (Brazil) Tamires (Corinthians) | (Brazil) Diany (Corinthians) (Brazil) Ary Borges (Palmeiras) (Brazil) Duda Sampaio (Internacional) (Brazil) Gabi Zanotti (Corinthians) | (Brazil) Bia Zaneratto (Palmeiras) (Brazil) Adriana (Corinthians) |
| 2023–2024 | Not awarded | | | |
| 2025 | (Brazil) Nicole (Corinthians) | (Brazil) Isabela Chagas (Cruzeiro) (Brazil) Mariza (Corinthians) (Brazil) Isa Haas (Cruzeiro) (Brazil) Gisseli (Cruzeiro) | (Colombia) Lorena Bedoya (Cruzeiro) (Brazil) Brena (Palmeiras) (Brazil) Gabi Zanotti (Corinthians) (Brazil) Duda Sampaio (Corinthians) | (Brazil) Amanda Gutierres (Palmeiras) (Brazil) Letícia (Cruzeiro) |

=== Most appearances ===
| Player | Position | Apps | Years | Club(s) |
|---|---|---|---|---|
| (Brazil) Gabi Zanotti | MF | 3 | 2021, 2022, 2025 | Corinthians |
| (Brazil) Bia Zaneratto | FW | 2 | 2021, 2022 | Palmeiras |
| (Brazil) Tamires | DF | 2 | 2021, 2022 | Corinthians |
| (Brazil) Adriana | FW | 2 | 2021, 2022 | Corinthians |
| (Brazil) Duda Sampaio | MF | 2 | 2022, 2025 | Internacional, Corinthians |

=== Additional categories ===
| Season | Category | | | | |
| Season | Top Goalscorer | Breakthrough Player | Most Beautiful Goal Author | Best Coach | Best Fan's Player ("Craque da Galera") |
|---|---|---|---|---|---|
| 2021 | (Brazil) Bia Zaneratto (Palmeiras) | (Brazil) Rafa Levis (Grêmio) | (Brazil) Jay (Flamengo) | (Brazil) Arthur Elias (Corinthians) | (Brazil) Rayanne (Flamengo) |
| 2022 | (Brazil) Cristiane (Santos) | (Brazil) Aline Gomes (Ferroviária) | —N/a | (Brazil) Arthur Elias (Corinthians) | —N/a |
| 2023–2024 | Not awarded | | | | |
| 2025 | (Brazil) Amanda Gutierres (Palmeiras) | (Brazil) Jhonson (Corinthians) | (Brazil) Érika (Corinthians) | (Brazil) Jonas Urias (Cruzeiro) | —N/a |

== See also ==
- Bola de Ouro
- Troféu Mesa Redonda
