= Vitória Calhau =

Brazilian professional footballer (born 2000)

Personal information
- Full name: Vitória de Jesus Santos Calhau
- Date of birth: 5 June 2000 (age 26)
- Place of birth: São Paulo, Brazil
- Height: 1.70 m (5 ft 7 in)
- Position: Centre-back

Team information
- Current team: Cruzeiro
- Number: 33

Youth career
- 2017: Tiger Academia

Senior career*
Years	Team	Apps	(Gls)
2018	Chapecoense	0	(0)
2019	Lusaca/Bahia	7	(0)
2019	São Francisco do Conde	6	(0)
2019–2021	Atlético Mineiro	0	(0)
2021–2022	São José	12	(0)
2023–	Cruzeiro	30	(3)

International career^{‡}
2024–	Brazil	2	(0)
- * Club domestic league appearances and goals as of 20:10, 26 November 2024 (UTC) ‡ National team caps and goals as of 20:10, 26 November 2024 (UTC)

Vitória de Jesus Santos Calhau (born 5 June 2000), known as Vitória Calhau, is a Brazilian professional footballer who plays as a centre-back for Cruzeiro and the Brazil national team.

== Club career ==
Calhau was born in São Paulo, and made her senior debut with Chapecoense, after playing for the under-17 side of Tiger Academia. Ahead of the 2019 season, she moved to Lusaca, and had a short stint at São Francisco do Conde before joining Atlético Mineiro in October of that year.

In February 2020, Calhau was allegedly harassed by Atlético's mascot during the presentation of the women's squad for the campaign, after it took her hand and asked her to spin around like a model. She suffered a serious knee injury in the following month, remaining sidelined for more than a year and being later released upon declared fit to play.

On 9 August 2021, Calhau was announced at São José. On 16 January 2023, she moved to Cruzeiro.

On 8 October 2024, after establishing herself as a starter for the Cabulosas, Calhau renewed her contract with the club until 2028.

== International career ==
On 4 October 2024, Calhau was called up to the Brazil national team by head coach Arthur Elias for two friendlies against Colombia. She made her full international debut on 26 October, coming on as a second-half substitute for Lauren in a 1–1 draw at the Estádio Kleber Andrade.

=== International goals ===
No.	Date	Venue	Opponent	Score	Result	Competition
1.	14 April 2026	Arena Pantanal, Cuiabá, Brazil	Zambia	6–1	6–1	2026 FIFA Series

== Honours ==
Cruzeiro

- Campeonato Mineiro de Futebol Feminino: 2024
- Copa Libertadores Femenina: 2026
