= Brazilian Footballer of the Year =

Brazilian Footballer of the Year may refer to:

- Bola de Ouro, an award given each year, since 1973, by the Brazilian magazine Placar
- Prêmio Craque do Brasileirão, an award given each year, since 2005, by the Brazilian Football Confederation and Rede Globo
