= Lorena Bedoya =

Colombian footballer (born 1997)

Personal information
- Full name: Lorena Bedoya Durango
- Date of birth: 6 October 1997 (age 29)
- Place of birth: Bello, Colombia
- Height: 1.70 m (5 ft 7 in)
- Position: Midfielder

Team information
- Current team: Cruzeiro
- Number: 56

Senior career*
Years	Team	Apps	(Gls)
2017	América de Cali		
2018–2019	Atlético Nacional		
2020–2021	Deportivo de La Coruña	15	(0)
2021–2022	Atlético Nacional	26	(2)
2021	→ Deportivo Cali (loan)	0	(0)
2022	Apollon Limassol		
2023–2024	Real Brasília	11	(0)
2025–	Cruzeiro	14	(0)

International career^{‡}
2021–	Colombia	23	(0)
Medal record
Women's football
Representing Colombia
CONMEBOL Women's Nations League
Winner	2025–26
Copa América Femenina
Runner-up	2022 Colombia
Runner-up	2025 Ecuador
- * Club domestic league appearances and goals as of 13 June 2025 ‡ National team caps and goals as of 10 March 2024

Lorena Bedoya Durango (born 6 October 1997) is a Colombian professional footballer who plays as a defensive midfielder for Série A1 club Cruzeiro and the Colombia national team.

Bedoya played for América de Cali and Atlético Nacional before spells in Spain with Deportivo de La Coruña and in Cyprus with Apollon Limassol. She moved to Brazil in 2023, and in 2025 helped Cruzeiro reach the club's first Série A1 final and win the Campeonato Mineiro, winning the Bola de Prata as the league's best defensive midfielder.

At international level she was a runner-up at the 2022 and 2025 Copa América Femenina, played at the 2023 FIFA Women's World Cup, and was part of the side that won the inaugural CONMEBOL Women's Nations League.

== Club career ==
=== Colombia and Europe ===
Bedoya began her career with América de Cali in 2017 before joining Atlético Nacional the following year. In January 2020, she and her compatriot Carolina Arbeláez signed for Spanish Primera División club Deportivo de La Coruña. She returned to Colombia in 2021, spending time on loan at Deportivo Cali before starting 14 matches for Atlético Nacional in 2022. She then had a season in Cyprus with Apollon Limassol.

=== Real Brasília ===
Bedoya moved to Brazil in 2023 to join Real Brasília. On 23 March 2024, she tore the anterior cruciate ligament in her knee playing for the club, an injury expected to keep her out until at least October and which ruled her out of the Olympics.

=== Cruzeiro ===
Bedoya was one of 13 new signings presented by Cruzeiro on 9 January 2025. She became a first-choice defensive midfielder, starting the first leg of the club's first national championship final, a 2–2 draw with Corinthians at the Arena Independência on 7 September 2025, which drew a record crowd for women's club football in Minas Gerais. Corinthians won the second leg 1–0 in São Paulo a week later. In November, Cruzeiro won a third consecutive Campeonato Mineiro, beating América Mineiro 6–2 on aggregate in a campaign in which Bedoya was a regular starter.

At the end of the season, Bedoya was named the best defensive midfielder of the Série A1 in ESPN's Bola de Prata awards, and was one of five Cruzeiro players in the CBF's team of the season. She had renewed her contract until the end of 2027 on 12 November 2025, having played 29 matches that season, but on 24 November underwent surgery for cartilage damage in her right knee.

== International career ==
Bedoya made her debut for Colombia on 21 September 2021, in a 2–0 friendly defeat to Mexico at the Estadio Azteca. On 3 July 2022, she was called up by Nelson Abadía for the 2022 Copa América Femenina on home soil. She played four of Colombia's five matches, setting up Manuela Vanegas in a 4–0 win over Chile, as Colombia went unbeaten to the final and lost 1–0 to Brazil.

At the 2023 FIFA Women's World Cup, Bedoya started in midfield as Colombia beat Germany 2–1 in the group stage, and the team went on to reach the quarter-finals for the first time. She also played at the 2024 CONCACAF W Gold Cup, where Colombia were eliminated 3–0 by the eventual champions, the United States, in the quarter-finals on 3 March 2024. Three weeks later, her cruciate ligament injury ended her hopes of playing at the Paris Olympics. She wrote that she would miss "a dream I've had since childhood".

Back from injury, Bedoya wore the number 5 at the 2025 Copa América Femenina in Ecuador. She started the final against Brazil in Quito, which Colombia lost 5–4 on penalties after a 4–4 draw. Recovered from her knee surgery, she started the 1–0 win over Uruguay in Cali on 5 June 2026 in the 2025–26 CONMEBOL Women's Nations League. Four days later, Colombia beat Paraguay 4–3 in Asunción to win the competition and qualify directly for the 2027 FIFA Women's World Cup.

== Style of play ==
Originally a centre-back, Bedoya was converted into a defensive midfielder with Colombia. Her game is built on winning the ball back, playing with intensity and starting attacks from deep.

== Honours ==
Cruzeiro

- Campeonato Mineiro: 2025
- Campeonato Brasileiro de Futebol Feminino Série A1 runner-up: 2025

Colombia

- CONMEBOL Women's Nations League: 2025–26
- Copa América Femenina runner-up: 2022, 2025

Individual

- Bola de Prata: 2025
- Campeonato Brasileiro Série A1 Team of the Year: 2025
