= Gisseli =

Brazilian professional footballer (born 2001)

Personal information
- Full name: Gisseli Mariano Calixto
- Date of birth: 27 July 2001 (age 25)
- Place of birth: Praia Norte, Brazil
- Height: 1.52 m (5 ft 0 in)
- Position: Left-back

Team information
- Current team: Cruzeiro
- Number: 8

Youth career
- Show de Bola
- 2017: Tiger Academia

Senior career*
Years	Team	Apps	(Gls)
2016	JV Lideral		
2017–2019	Chapecoense	11	(1)
2019–2021	Grêmio	39	(5)
2022–2024	Flamengo	63	(11)
2025–	Cruzeiro	30	(6)

International career
2018	Brazil U17	9	(0)
2019	Brazil U20	11	(0)
- * Club domestic league appearances and goals as of 13:49, 10 December 2025 (UTC)

Gisseli Mariano Calixto (born 27 July 2001), simply known as Gisseli, is a Brazilian professional footballer who plays as a left-back for Cruzeiro.

== Club career ==
Born in Praia Norte, Tocantins, Gisseli began her career with hometown side Show de Bola, a youth school set up by her grandfather. In 2016, she went on a trial in Imperatriz, Maranhão and subsequently joined JV Lideral.

After playing for Tiger Academia in the countryside of the São Paulo state, Gisseli moved to Chapecoense. On 29 August 2019, she was announced at Grêmio.

On 30 December 2020, Gisseli renewed her link with the Gurias Gremistas for a further year. On 15 December 2021, she moved to Flamengo on a one-year deal.

Gisseli was regularly used during her three-year spell at the club, scoring a career-best eight goals in the 2023 season. On 9 January 2025, she and other 12 players were presented as Cruzeiro's new signings, and was chosen as the best left-back of the season.

== International career ==
Gisseli represented Brazil at under-17 and under-20 levels.

== Honours ==
Flamengo

- Campeonato Carioca de Futebol Feminino: 2023, 2024
- Copa Rio de Futebol Feminino: 2023

Cruzeiro

- Campeonato Mineiro de Futebol Feminino: 2025

Brazil U17

- South American U-17 Women's Championship: 2018

Individual

- Bola de Prata: 2025
- Campeonato Brasileiro Série A1 Team of the Year: 2025
