= 2025 Paraguayan Women's Football Championship =

Campeonato Anual FEM
- Season: 2025
- Dates: 1 February – 25 August 2025
- Champions: Libertad
- Copa Libertadores Femenina: Libertad; Olimpia
- Matches: 132
- Goals: 574 (4.35 per match)
- Top goalscorer: Amada Peralta (30 goals)

The 2025 Campeonato Anual FEM was the twenty-fifth official Paraguayan Annual W Championship, the highest league of women's association football in Paraguay. It was organized by the Paraguayan Football Association.

== Competition system ==
The competition is played under a round-robin system, with home-and-away matches, with each team playing some matches at home and others away, over two rounds of eleven matchdays each. The team that accumulates the most points at the end of the 22 matchdays is crowned champion.

In the event of a tie on points between two contenders, the title is decided based on the following criteria:

1. Points in head-to-head matches.
2. Goal difference in head-to-head matches.
3. Goal difference.
4. Most goals scored.
5. Playoff match at a neutral venue.

If more than two teams are tied, the same criteria are taken into account, except for the last point, with a draw being used as the final option. Both the champion and the runner-up will qualify for the 2026 Copa Libertadores Femenina.

== Teams ==
Team	City	Estadium	Capacity	Foundation
Atlético Tembetary	Villa Elisa	Complejo Tembetary	500	3 August, 1912
Cerro Porteño	Asunción	General Pablo Rojas	45 000	1 October, 1912
Deportivo Recoleta	Asunción	Roque Battilana	6 000	12 February, 1931
General Caballero JLM	Dr. Juan León Mallorquín	Ka'arendy	10 120	21 June, 1962
Guaraní	Asunción	Rogelio Livieres	8 000	12 October, 1903
Libertad	Asunción	La Huerta	14 000	30 July, 1905
Nacional	Asunción	Arsenio Erico	7 500	5 June, 1904
Humaitá	Mariano Roque Alonso	Pioneros de Corumba Cué	7 000	19 February, 1932
Olimpia	Asunción	Osvaldo Domínguez Dibb	22 000	25 July, 1902
Sportivo 2 de Mayo	Pedro Juan Caballero	Río Parapití	25 000	6 December, 1935
Sportivo Ameliano	Villeta	La Fortaleza del Pikysyry	7 000	6 January, 1936
Sportivo Luqueño	Luque	Feliciano Cáceres	26 974	1 May, 1921
Sportivo Trinidense	Asunción	Martín Torres	3 000	11 August, 1935

=== Location ===
Most of the clubs (7) are concentrated in the country's capital. Meanwhile, four are located nearby in cities in the Central Department. Finally, one club belongs to the Amambay Department and another to the Alto Paraná Department. The Centro de Alto Rendimiento de Fútbol Femenino (CARFEM), owned by the Paraguayan Football Association, is included due to its frequent use by teams that choose to play their home matches there.

Department	Quantity	Teams
Asunción	7	Cerro Porteño, Olimpia, Guaraní, Libertad, Nacional*, Deportivo Recoleta y Sportivo Trinidense
Central	4	Atlético Tembetary, Humaitá*, Sportivo Luqueño y Sportivo Ameliano
Amambay	1	Sportivo 2 de Mayo
Alto Paraná	1	General Caballero JLM

*	They play as Nacional/Humaitá.

== Standings ==
Pos	Team	Pld	W	D	L	GF	GA	GD	Pts	
1	Libertad (C)	2	0	2	0	102	8	+94	2	Qualify for the 2026 Copa Libertadores Femenina and the 2025 Copa Paraguay FEM
2	Olimpia	2	0	2	0	125	9	+116	2	Qualify for the 2026 Copa Libertadores Femenina and the 2025 Copa Paraguay FEM
3	Guaraní	3	0	3	0	79	11	+68	3	Qualify for the 2025 Copa Paraguay FEM.
4	Cerro Porteño	3	0	3	0	58	15	+43	3	Qualify for the 2025 Copa Paraguay FEM.
5	Atlético Tembetary	2	0	2	0	40	36	+4	2	
6	Nacional/Humaitá	4	0	4	0	34	40	−6	4	
7	Sportivo Trinidense	4	0	4	0	42	54	−12	4	
8	General Caballero JLM	3	0	3	0	26	43	−17	3	
9	Deportivo Recoleta	4	0	4	0	21	68	−47	4	
10	2 de Mayo	1	0	1	0	21	64	−43	1	
11	Sportivo Ameliano	0	0	0	0	14	99	−85	0	
12	Sportivo Luqueño	0	0	0	0	11	126	−115	0	

Updated to match(es) played on unknown. Source: APF
(C) Champions

== Champions ==
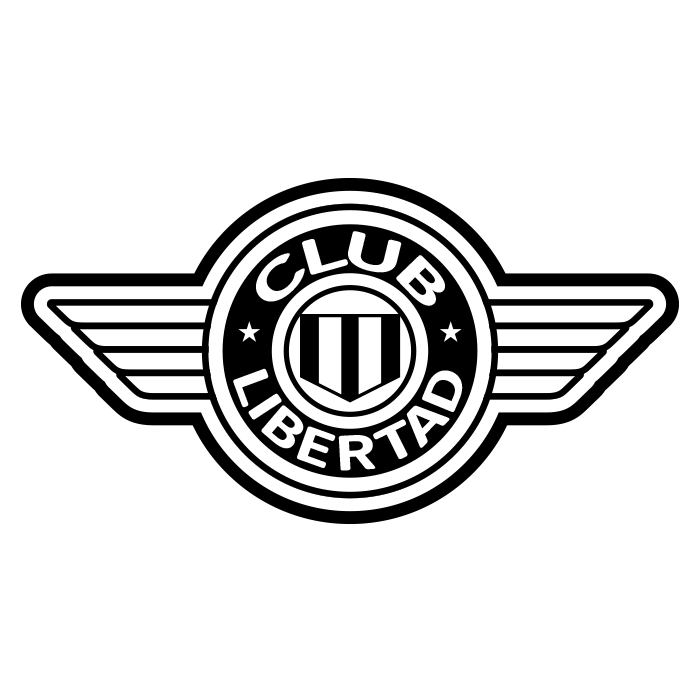
Club Libertad

3rd title

== Aggregate table ==
The cumulative score is the one obtained by each team by adding the results from the 2025 Campeonato Anual FEM Senior and Under-18 tournaments. At the end of the tournament, the two groups for the 2025 Copa efe will be determined.

Pos	Team	Pld	W	D	L	GF	GA	GD	Pts	
1	Olimpia	44	40	3	1	238	19	+219	123	Zone 1 of the 2025 Copa efe.
2	Cerro Porteño	44	34	5	5	136	34	+102	107	Zone 1 of the 2025 Copa efe.
3	Libertad	44	31	5	8	156	43	+113	98	Zone 1 of the 2025 Copa efe.
4	Nacional/Humaitá	44	23	7	14	69	65	+4	76	Zone 1 of the 2025 Copa efe.
5	Guaraní	44	21	4	19	99	62	+37	67	Zone 1 of the 2025 Copa efe.
6	Atlético Tembetary	44	20	4	20	80	89	−9	64	Zone 1 of the 2025 Copa efe.
7	General Caballero JLM	44	18	5	21	84	76	+8	59	Zone 2 of the 2025 Copa efe.
8	Sportivo Trinidense	44	10	6	28	56	138	−82	36	Zone 2 of the 2025 Copa efe.
9	Deportivo Recoleta	44	9	9	26	39	112	−73	36	Zone 2 of the 2025 Copa efe.
10	2 de Mayo	44	13	2	29	57	112	−55	41	Zone 2 of the 2025 Copa efe.
11	Sportivo Luqueño	44	9	5	30	40	176	−136	32	Zone 2 of the 2025 Copa efe.
12	Sportivo Ameliano	44	8	1	35	29	157	−128	25	Zone 2 of the 2025 Copa efe.

Updated to match(es) played on unknown. Source: APF

== Top scorers ==
Pos.	Player	Team	Goals
1	Amada Peralta	Olimpia	30
2	Liz Peña	Libertad	28
3	Liza Larrea	Libertad	20
4	Patricia Sánchez	Guaraní	15
5	Micaela Valdez	Atlético Tembetary	14
6	Karina Castellano	Guaraní	14
7	Mariana Pion	Olimpia	13
8	Camila López	Cerro Porteño	12
9	Luz Franco	Guaraní	12
10	Nabila Perruchino	Olimpia	12
11	Ángeles Patiño	Atlético Tembetary	11
12	María Portillo	Olimpia	11
