= Rafa Levis =

Brazilian professional footballer (born 2002)

Personal information
- Full name: Rafaela Levis Maróstica
- Date of birth: 26 November 2002 (age 23)
- Place of birth: Farroupilha, Brazil
- Position: Attacking midfielder

Team information
- Current team: Cruzeiro

Youth career
- 2019: São Paulo
- 2020–2021: Grêmio

Senior career*
Years	Team	Apps	(Gls)
2016	Chapecoense		
2017	Mundo Novo		
2018–2019	Chapecoense	9	(3)
2019–2020	São Paulo	7	(1)
2020–2024	Grêmio	69	(11)
2025	América Mineiro	23	(3)
2026–	Cruzeiro	0	(0)

International career
2018	Brazil U17	3	(0)
2022	Brazil U20	11	(2)
- * Club domestic league appearances and goals as of 17:07, 10 December 2025 (UTC)

Rafaela Levis Maróstica (born 26 November 2002), known as Rafa Levis, is a Brazilian professional footballer who plays as an attacking midfielder for Cruzeiro.

== Club career ==
Born in Farroupilha, Rio Grande do Sul, Rafa Levis began her career with Chapecoense in 2016. She moved to Mundo Novo in the following year, before returning to Chape in 2018.

In 2019, Rafa Levis signed for São Paulo, initially for the under-18 team. She managed to feature with the main squad in the following year, before moving to Grêmio, where she also initially joined the youth sides.

Promoted to the first team of Grêmio in April 2021, Rafa Levis subsequently became a regular starter for the side, and renewed her contract until 2023 on 13 November.

On 2 January 2025, Rafa Levis moved to América Mineiro also in the top tier. In October of that year, she agreed to a pre-contract with Cruzeiro, effective the following 1 January.

== Honours ==
Grêmio

- Campeonato Gaúcho de Futebol Feminino: 2022, 2024

Brazil U17

- South American U-17 Women's Championship: 2018

Brazil U20

- South American U-20 Women's Championship: 2022

Individual

- Campeonato Brasileiro Série A1 Breakthrough Player: 2021
