= Alaides Paz =

Uruguayan footballer (born 1996)

Personal information
- Full name: Julieta Alaides Bonilla Paz
- Date of birth: 27 May 1996 (age 30)
- Place of birth: Canelones, Uruguay
- Height: 1.63 m (5 ft 4 in)
- Position: Forward

Team information
- Current team: Belgrano
- Number: 13

Senior career*
Years	Team	Apps	(Gls)
2015	Club Nacional		
- Alumni
- River Plate Montevideo
- Colón
2016–2021	Racing (Córdoba)		
2023–	Belgrano		

International career
- Uruguay U17
2023–	Uruguay		
- * Club domestic league appearances and goals

Julieta Alaides Bonilla Paz (born 27 May 1996) is a Uruguayan professional footballer who plays as a forward for Argentine side Belgrano and the Uruguay women's national team.

== Club career ==
=== Early career ===
Like many girls, Paz started playing football, beginning by playing on teams with boys at the Colinas Solymar and Cruz Azul clubs. Later, in women's football, she played for several clubs in her native country such as Nacional (where she participated in editions of the Copa Libertadores), Alumni, River Plate Montevideo and Colón.

Paz would soon cross the pond to become part of the Racing de Córdoba women's team, where she competed in the Liga Cordobesa de Fútbol and scored more than one hundred goals with the team. In 2016, she left the pitch to become a mother and after the COVID-19 pandemic she completely withdrew from professional football.

=== Belgrano ===
In 2023, Paz had the opportunity to return to professional football after several years playing as an amateur, joining Belgrano. She signed her first professional contract with the club to play in the Campeonato Femenino.

In the Clausura 2025 season, Belgrano won their first Campeonato Femenino league title, marking Paz's first league title in her career, in which she scored the second goal in the final.

== International career ==
Once the Campeonato Femenino season began in 2023, Paz played in every match, which led to her being called up to the Uruguay national team to play two matches against Peru, where she scored a goal.

On 13 June 2025, Paz was called up to the Uruguay squad for the 2025 Copa América Femenina. Her team qualified for the semi-finals, where they lost to Brazil.

== Honours ==
=== Club ===
Belgrano

- Campeonato de Fútbol Femenino: Clausura 2025
