= Daiane Muniz =

Brazilian physical educator and soccer referee

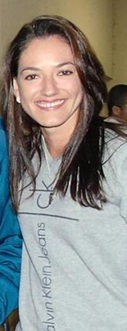
- Full name: Daiane Caroline Muniz dos Santos
- Born: 25 May 1988 (age 38); Três Lagoas, Mato Grosso do Sul, Brazil
- Other occupation: Physical education teacher

Domestic
Years	League	Role
2018–	CBF (national)	FIFA-listed referee

International
Years	League	Role
2018–	FIFA	International referee

Daiane Caroline Muniz dos Santos (25 May 1988) is a Brazilian physical education teacher and soccer referee.

== Biography ==
Daiane is from Três Lagoas, a city located in the interior of the state of Mato Grosso do Sul. She graduated in physical education from the University Center of Santa Fé do Sul (Unifunec), located in Santa Fé do Sul, in the interior of São Paulo.

Since 2018, she has been a member of FIFA's panel of referees. In 2020, she became the first woman to be the main referee in a match of the South Mato Grosso Men's Championship, in the game between Corumbaense and Maracaju. She later transferred to the Federação Paulista de Futebol (FPF), the entity responsible for soccer in the state of São Paulo, and participated in video refereeing in the Brazilian Championship Series A.

In 2022, she served as a video assistant referee (VAR) at the FIFA U-20 Women's World Cup in Costa Rica. She also performed the same role at the 2023 FIFA Women's World Cup. She suffered gender discrimination during the São Paulo State Championship match on 21 February 2026, between Red Bull Bragantino and São Paulo, held in the city of Bragança Paulista, when Bragantino defender Gustavo Marques complained that a game of that magnitude could not be refereed by a woman. Red Bull Bragantino fined the player 50% of his total salary and suspended him for one match. The São Paulo State Sports Court (TJD-SP) suspended Gustavo Marques for 12 games and imposed an additional fine of 30 000 reais.

== Statistics ==
These are statistics from major national and international competitions.

=== FIFA Competitions ===
==== FIFA U-17 Women's World Cup ====
Disciplinary summary – selected matches
Edition	Stage	Date	Match			Stadium	City	Cards			Pen.	Ref.
Edition	Stage	Date	Home team	Score	Away team	Stadium	City	Yellow card	(yellow card) (yellow-red card)	Red card	Pen.	Ref.
2024	Group A	22 October	Nigeria	1–0	Dominican Republic	Félix Sánchez	Santo Domingo	0	0	0	0	
2024	Group C	17 October	North Korea	4–1	Mexico	Cibao FC	Santiago de los Caballeros	0	0	0	0	
2024	Final	3 November	North Korea	1–1 (4–3 pens.)	Spain	Félix Sánchez	Santo Domingo	2	0	0	0	
Total								2	0	0	0	

=== CONMEBOL Competitions ===
==== Copa Libertadores Femenina ====
Disciplinary summary – selected match
Edition	Stage	Date	Match			Stadium	City	Cards			Pen.	Ref.
Edition	Stage	Date	Home team	Score	Away team	Stadium	City	Yellow card	(yellow card) (yellow-red card)	Red card	Pen.	Ref.
2021	Group C	7 November	Deportivo Cali	8–0	C.D. Real Tomayapo	Osvaldo Domínguez Dibb	Asunción	0	0	0	0	
Total								0	0	0	0	

=== CBF Competitions ===
==== Campeonato Brasileiro de Futebol Feminino Série A1 ====
Disciplinary summary – selected matches
Edition	Stage	Date	Match			Stadium	City	Cards			Pen.	Ref.
Edition	Stage	Date	Home team	Score	Away team	Stadium	City	Yellow card	(yellow card) (yellow-red card)	Red card	Pen.	Ref.
2024	First stage	19 March	Flamengo	1–2	Cruzeiro	Luso-Brasileiro	Rio de Janeiro	2	0	0	0	
2024	First stage	27 March	Avaí FC/Kindermann	1–3	América-MG	Carlos A. C. Neves	Caçador	3	0	0	3	
2024	First stage	11 May	Cruzeiro	3–0	Botafogo	Castor Cifuentes	Nova Lima	5	0	1	0	
2024	Quarter-finals	27 August	Corinthians	1–0	Red Bull Bragantino	Canindé	São Paulo	2	0	0	0	
2024	Final	22 September	Corinthians	2–0	São Paulo	Neo Química Arena	São Paulo	4	0	1	0	
Total								16	0	2	3	

==== Campeonato Brasileiro Série B ====
Disciplinary summary – selected match
Edition	Stage	Date	Match			Stadium	City	Cards			Pen.	Ref.
Edition	Stage	Date	Home team	Score	Away team	Stadium	City	Yellow card	(yellow card) (yellow-red card)	Red card	Pen.	Ref.
2024	Second turn	24 November	América-MG	3–0	Brusque	Independência	Belo Horizonte	1	0	0	1	
Total								1	0	0	1	

==== Campeonato Brasileiro Série C ====
Disciplinary summary – selected match
Edition	Stage	Date	Match			Stadium	City	Cards			Pen.	Ref.
Edition	Stage	Date	Home team	Score	Away team	Stadium	City	Yellow card	(yellow card) (yellow-red card)	Red card	Pen.	Ref.
2021	First stage	27 June	Botafogo-SP	1–0	Oeste	Estádio Santa Cruz (Arena Nicnet)	Ribeirão Preto	5	0	0	0	
Total								5	0	0	0	

==== Campeonato Brasileiro Série D ====
Disciplinary summary – selected matches from Série D
Edition	Stage	Date	Match			Stadium	City	Cards			Pen.	Ref.
Edition	Stage	Date	Home team	Score	Away team	Stadium	City	Yellow card	(yellow card) (yellow-red card)	Red card	Pen.	Ref.
2020	First stage – Group A4	20 September	Vitória da Conquista	2–0	Coruripe	Lomantão	Vitória da Conquista	9	0	0	0	
2020	First stage – Group A7	11 October	Nacional-PR	1–2	Bangu	Estádio Municipal Olímpico Erich George	Rolândia	2	0	0	0	
2020	First stage – Group A8	21 October	Pelotas	1–1	CA Tubarão	Boca do Lobo	Pelotas	6	0	0	0	
2021	First stage – Group A4	13 June	Sergipe	1–0	Retrô	Arena Batistão	Aracaju	7	0	0	0	
2021	First stage – Group A5	14 August	Jaraguá-GO	1–1	Aparecidense	Amintas de Freitas Stadium	Jaraguá, Goiás	6	0	0	1	
2024	First stage – Group A1	18 May	Porto Velho	2–0	Manaus	Aluizão	Porto Velho	3	0	0	0	
2024	First stage – Group A2	9 June	Tocantinópolis	3–0	Águia de Marabá	Ribeirão	Tocantinópolis	5	0	0	0	
Total								38	0	0	1	

==== Supercopa do Brasil de Futebol Feminino ====
Disciplinary summary – selected quarter-final matches
Edition	Stage	Date	Match			Stadium	City	Cards			Pen.	Ref.
Edition	Stage	Date	Home team	Score	Away team	Stadium	City	Yellow card	(yellow card) (yellow-red card)	Red card	Pen.	Ref.
2022	Quarter-finals	6 February	Corinthians	3–0	Palmeiras	Neo Química Arena	São Paulo	6	0	0	0	
2024	Quarter-finals	10 February	Real Brasília	0–1	Cruzeiro	Bezerrão	Gama	2	0	0	0	
Total								8	0	0	0	

=== Friendly competitions ===
==== Brasil Ladies Cup ====
Disciplinary summary – selected match
Edition	Stage	Date	Match			Stadium	City	Cards			Pen.	Ref.
Edition	Stage	Date	Home team	Score	Away team	Stadium	City	Yellow card	(yellow card) (yellow-red card)	Red card	Pen.	Ref.
2021	First stage	14 December	Ferroviária	0–2	Internacional	Gabriel M. da Silva	Santana de Parnaíba	1	0	0	0	
Total								1	0	0	0	

=== Matches between Women's National Teams ===
Disciplinary summary – selected match
Edition	Stage	Date	Match			Stadium	City	Cards			Pen.	Ref.
Edition	Stage	Date	Home team	Score	Away team	Stadium	City	Yellow card	(yellow card) (yellow-red card)	Red card	Pen.	Ref.
2021	Int. Manaus	25 November	Brazil	6–1	India	Arena da Amazônia	Manaus	0	0	0	0	
Total								0	0	0	0	
