= 2026 Colombian Women's Football League =

Liga Femenina BetPlay DIMAYOR
- Season: 2026
- Dates: 12 February – 26 September 2026
- Champions: Deportivo Cali (4th title)
- Copa Libertadores Femenina: Deportivo Cali; Santa Fe
- Matches: 158
- Goals: 386 (2.44 per match)
- Top goalscorer: Manuela González; Ingrid Guerra (15 goals each)
- Biggest home win: Millonarios 6–0 Atl. Bucaramanga (30 March)
- Biggest away win: Llaneros 0–5 Deportivo Cali (15 May)
- Highest scoring: Santa Fe 4–4 Fortaleza (20 August)

The 2026 Colombian Women's Football League (officially known as the Liga Femenina BetPlay DIMAYOR 2026 for sponsorship purposes) was the tenth season of Colombia's women's football league. The season began on 12 February and ended on 26 September 2026.

In this season, the defending champions Deportivo Cali won their fourth league title and third in a row after defeating Santa Fe 7–4 on aggregate in the finals.

== Format ==
For this season the competition kept the format used in 2025, with four stages played. The first stage was a single round-robin tournament in which the 16 participating teams played each other once as well as an additional match against their derby rival for a total of 16 rounds. For the second stage, the top eight teams at the end of the first stage were drawn into two groups of four teams in which the top two teams from the first stage were seeded, and each team played the others in their group twice.

The top two teams of each group advanced to the semi-finals, which were played over two legs with the group winners facing the runners-up from the other group. Both semi-final winners played the final series to decide the league champions and also qualified for the 2026 Copa Libertadores Femenina.

== Teams ==
The competition was played by 16 DIMAYOR affiliate clubs who entered their women's teams, 14 of which participated in the previous season. While Llaneros returned after a one-season hiatus, Alianza and La Equidad did not enter this edition of the tournament, the latter being replaced by Internacional de Bogotá after its takeover by the Tylis–Porter Group in early 2025.

=== Stadia and locations ===
Locations of the 2026 Liga Femenina teams

Team	City	Stadium	Capacity
América de Cali	Cali	Pascual Guerrero	38,588
Atlético Bucaramanga	Bucaramanga	Américo Montanini	28,000
Atlético Nacional	Medellín	Atanasio Girardot	44,863
Deportivo Cali	Palmira	Deportivo Cali	44,000
Deportivo Pasto	Pasto	Departamental Libertad	20,000
Fortaleza	Bogotá	Metropolitano de Techo	10,000
Independiente Medellín	Medellín	Atanasio Girardot	44,863
Inter Palmira	Palmira	Francisco Rivera Escobar	15,300
Internacional de Bogotá	Bogotá	Metropolitano de Techo	10,000
Junior	Barranquilla	Romelio Martínez	11,000
Llaneros	Villavicencio	La Esperanza	2,000
Millonarios	Bogotá	Nemesio Camacho El Campín	39,512
Once Caldas	Manizales	Palogrande	31,611
Orsomarso	Yumbo	Municipal Raúl Miranda	3,500
Real Santander (Note: In association with Deportes Tolima.)	Piedecuesta	Villa Concha	5,500
Santa Fe	Bogotá	Nemesio Camacho El Campín	39,512

== First stage ==
The first stage started on 12 February and consisted of a single-round robin tournament with the 16 participating teams playing each other once, with an additional round against a regional rival. It ended on 20 August, with the top eight teams advancing to the second stage of the competition.

=== Standings ===
Pos	Team	Pld	W	D	L	GF	GA	GD	Pts	Qualification
1	Atlético Nacional	16	13	0	3	34	9	+25	39	Advance to the second stage
2	Deportivo Cali	16	12	2	2	33	10	+23	38	Advance to the second stage
3	Millonarios	16	10	5	1	32	8	+24	35	Advance to the second stage
4	América de Cali	16	11	2	3	29	8	+21	35	Advance to the second stage
5	Internacional de Bogotá	16	9	2	5	22	14	+8	29	Advance to the second stage
6	Santa Fe	16	7	5	4	27	15	+12	26	Advance to the second stage
7	Inter Palmira	16	7	5	4	15	17	−2	26	Advance to the second stage
8	Orsomarso	16	5	7	4	18	14	+4	22	Advance to the second stage
9	Independiente Medellín	16	6	1	9	21	22	−1	19	
10	Fortaleza	16	4	5	7	14	23	−9	17	
11	Atlético Bucaramanga	16	5	2	9	15	34	−19	17	
12	Llaneros	16	3	4	9	11	33	−22	13	
13	Junior	16	2	6	8	12	24	−12	12	
14	Real Santander	16	1	7	8	4	22	−18	10	
15	Once Caldas	16	1	5	10	7	25	−18	8	
16	Deportivo Pasto	16	1	4	11	12	28	−16	7	

Source: Dimayor, Soccerway
Rules for classification: 1) Points, 2) Goal difference, 3) Goals for, 4) Away goals for, 5) Away goals against, 6) Yellow cards, 7) Red cards, 8) Drawing of lots.

=== Results ===
Home \ Away	AME	BUC	NAC	CAL	PAS	FOR	DIM	IDP	IDB	JUN	LLA	MIL	ONC	ORS	RSA	SFE
América de Cali	—	—	1–0	0–1	2–0	—	—	5–0	—	3–0	4–1	—	—	1–0	—	1–2
Atlético Bucaramanga	1–4	—	—	1–4	3–1	—	—	0–1	—	—	3–0	—	2–1	1–1	2–0	—
Atlético Nacional	—	2–0	—	1–2	—	3–0	1–0	—	2–0	—	—	2–1	1–0	—	5–0	—
Deportivo Cali	1–0	—	—	—	2–0	—	3–1	0–1	1–0	2–0	—	1–3	—	—	4–0	—
Deportivo Pasto	—	—	1–3	—	—	1–2	—	2–3	0–0	0–0	—	1–2	4–1	—	—	0–0
Fortaleza	0–1	2–1	—	1–3	—	—	1–0	—	0–2	—	—	0–3	0–0	—	0–0	—
Independiente Medellín	0–3	3–0	1–3	—	3–1	—	—	—	—	—	2–1	—	3–0	2–0	3–0	—
Inter Palmira	—	—	0–1	—	—	3–1	0–0	—	1–0	2–1	—	1–1	—	1–1	—	0–2
Internacional de Bogotá	1–1	4–0	—	—	—	1–0	1–0	—	—	—	2–0	2–3	2–1	—	2–0	—
Junior	—	0–1	1–2	—	—	0–0	3–2	—	1–2	—	0–0	0–0	—	—	—	1–1
Llaneros	—	—	1–5	0–5	2–0	0–2	—	2–0	—	2–1	—	—	—	1–1	—	1–4
Millonarios	0–0	6–0	—	—	—	—	3–1	—	—	—	4–0	—	3–0	2–0	0–0	1–0
Once Caldas	1–2	—	—	0–2	1–0	—	—	0–0	—	1–2	0–0	—	—	1–1	—	0–3
Orsomarso	—	—	1–0	1–1	3–0	1–1	—	0–0	1–2	5–1	—	—	—	—	—	1–0
Real Santander	0–1	0–0	—	—	1–1	—	—	1–2	—	1–1	0–0	—	0–0	0–1	—	—
Santa Fe	—	5–0	0–3	1–1	—	4–4	2–0	—	3–1	—	—	0–0	—	—	0–1	—

Source: Dimayor, Soccerway
Legend: Blue = home team win; Yellow = draw; Red = away team win.

== Second stage ==
The eight teams that advanced to the second stage were drawn into two groups of four teams, with the top two teams from the first stage being seeded in each group. The top two teams in each group advanced to the semi-finals. This stage of the competition was played from 24 August to 12 September 2026.

=== Group A ===
Pos	Team	Pld	W	D	L	GF	GA	GD	Pts	Qualification	MIL	NAC	IDP	IDB
1	Millonarios	6	3	3	0	9	5	+4	12	Advance to the semi-finals	—	2–1	2–0	2–2
2	Atlético Nacional	6	3	0	3	10	8	+2	9	Advance to the semi-finals	0–1	—	3–1	1–0
3	Inter Palmira	6	2	1	3	7	12	−5	7		2–2	3–2	—	1–0
4	Internacional de Bogotá	6	1	2	3	6	7	−1	5		0–0	1–3	3–0	—

Source: Dimayor
Legend: Blue = home team win; Yellow = draw; Red = away team win.
Rules for classification: 1) Points, 2) First stage position (only applies for the seeded team, if it is involved in a tie), 3) Goal difference, 4) Goals for, 5) Away goals for, 6) Away goals against, 7) First stage position.

=== Group B ===
Pos	Team	Pld	W	D	L	GF	GA	GD	Pts	Qualification	CAL	SFE	AME	ORS
1	Deportivo Cali	6	3	2	1	6	2	+4	11 (Note: Deportivo Cali ahead of Santa Fe for being the group's seeded team.)	Advance to the semi-finals	—	3–0	0–1	1–0
2	Santa Fe	6	3	2	1	7	5	+2	11	Advance to the semi-finals	0–0	—	1–1	3–0
3	América de Cali	6	3	1	2	8	5	+3	10		1–2	0–1	—	3–1
4	Orsomarso	6	0	1	5	2	11	−9	1		0–0	1–2	0–2	—

Source: Dimayor
Legend: Blue = home team win; Yellow = draw; Red = away team win.
Rules for classification: 1) Points, 2) First stage position (only applies for the seeded team, if it is involved in a tie), 3) Goal difference, 4) Goals for, 5) Away goals for, 6) Away goals against, 7) First stage position.

== Knockout stage ==
=== Bracket ===
Semi-finals
Santa Fe	2	2	4
Millonarios	2	1	3
Atlético Nacional	1	0	1
Deportivo Cali	2	4	6

Finals
Santa Fe	2	2	4
Deportivo Cali	3	4	7

=== Semi-finals ===
Team 1	Agg.	Team 2	1st leg	2nd leg
Santa Fe	4–3	Millonarios	2–2	2–1
Atlético Nacional	1–6	Deportivo Cali	1–2	0–4

==== First leg ====
16 September 2026	Atlético Nacional	1–2	Deportivo Cali	Medellín
18:00 UTC−5	González 32'	Report	Guerra 55'; Aponzá 63'	Stadium: Atanasio Girardot; Referee: Laury Guerrero

17 September 2026	Santa Fe	2–2	Millonarios	Bogotá
19:00 UTC−5	Hernández 12'; Pérez 33'	Report	Restrepo 17'; Gómez 21'	Stadium: El Campín; Referee: Yessica Vásquez

==== Second leg ====
20 September 2026	Deportivo Cali	4–0 (6–1 agg.)	Atlético Nacional	Palmira
16:15 UTC−5	Guerra 39', 45'; Aponzá 49'; Bermeo 80' (pen.)	Report		Stadium: Deportivo Cali; Referee: Paula Fernández

20 September 2026	Millonarios	1–2 (3–4 agg.)	Santa Fe	Bogotá
18:30 UTC−5	Sánchez 58'	Report	Garavito 36'; Zamorano 62'	Stadium: El Campín; Referee: Erika Sánchez

=== Finals ===
23 September 2026
19:00 UTC−5

Santa Fe	2–3	Deportivo Cali
Zamorano 32' (pen.), 41'	Report	Bermeo 13'; Guerra 18'; Aponzá 25'

Estadio La Independencia, Tunja
Attendance: 10,332
Referee: Vanessa Ceballos

26 September 2026
18:00 UTC−5

Deportivo Cali	4–2	Santa Fe
Aponzá 20'; Guerra 42', 90+3'; Cortés 56' (o.g.)	Report	Zamorano 15', 63'

Estadio Deportivo Cali, Palmira
Attendance: 18,200
Referee: Karen Lozano

Deportivo Cali won 7–4 on aggregate.

== Aggregate table ==
Pos	Team	Pld	W	D	L	GF	GA	GD	Pts	Qualification
1	Deportivo Cali (C)	26	19	4	3	52	17	+35	61	Qualification for the Copa Libertadores Femenina
2	Millonarios	24	13	9	2	44	17	+27	48	
3	Atlético Nacional	24	16	0	8	45	23	+22	48	
4	América de Cali	22	14	3	5	37	13	+24	45	
5	Santa Fe	26	11	8	7	42	30	+12	41	Qualification for the Copa Libertadores Femenina
6	Internacional de Bogotá	22	10	4	8	28	21	+7	34	
7	Inter Palmira	22	9	6	7	22	29	−7	33	
8	Orsomarso	22	5	8	9	20	25	−5	23	
9	Independiente Medellín	16	6	1	9	21	22	−1	19	
10	Fortaleza	16	4	5	7	14	23	−9	17	
11	Atlético Bucaramanga	16	5	2	9	15	34	−19	17	
12	Llaneros	16	3	4	9	11	33	−22	13	
13	Junior	16	2	6	8	12	24	−12	12	
14	Real Santander	16	1	7	8	4	22	−18	10	
15	Once Caldas	16	1	5	10	7	25	−18	8	
16	Deportivo Pasto	16	1	4	11	12	28	−16	7	

Source: Dimayor
Rules for classification: 1) Points, 2) Goal difference, 3) Goals for, 4) Away goals for, 5) Away goals against, 6) Yellow cards, 7) Red cards, 8) Drawing of lots.
(C) Champions

== Top scorers ==
Rank	Player	Club	Goals
1	(Colombia) Manuela González	Atlético Nacional	15
1	(Colombia) Ingrid Guerra	Deportivo Cali	15
3	(Colombia) Kelly Restrepo	Millonarios	14
3	(Colombia) Mariana Zamorano	Santa Fe	14
5	(Venezuela) Génesis Flórez	América de Cali	10
5	(Venezuela) Ysaura Viso	Santa Fe	10
7	(Venezuela) Joemar Guarecuco	Internacional de Bogotá	9
8	(Colombia) Belkis Niño	Atlético Bucaramanga	8
9	(Colombia) Luiza Montaño	Inter Palmira	7
9	(Colombia) Melanin Aponzá	Deportivo Cali	7

Source: Soccerway

== See also ==
- Colombian Women's Football League
