= Praia Norte =

Municipality in Tocantins, Brazil

Coordinates: 5°22′S 47°37′W

- Municipality
- Interactive map of Praia Norte
- Country: Brazil
- Region: Northern
- State: Tocantins
- Mesoregion: Ocidental do Tocantins

Population (2020)
  - Total: 8,498
- Time zone: UTC−3 (BRT)

Praia Norte is a municipality in the state of Tocantins in the Northern region of Brazil.

== See also ==
- List of municipalities in Tocantins
