= Marília Furiel =

Brazilian footballer (born 2003)

Personal information
- Full name: Marília da Cruz Furiel
- Date of birth: 27 January 2003 (age 23)
- Place of birth: Manaquiri, Brazil
- Position: Forward

Team information
- Current team: Cruzeiro
- Number: 20

Youth career
- Iranduba

Senior career*
Years	Team	Apps	(Gls)
2019–2020	Iranduba	10	(0)
2020	3B da Amazônia	2	(0)
2021–	Cruzeiro	43	(12)

International career^{‡}
2024–	Brazil	1	(0)
- * Club domestic league appearances and goals as of 21:40, 26 November 2024 (UTC) ‡ National team caps and goals as of 21:40, 26 November 2024 (UTC)

Marília da Cruz Furiel (born 27 January 2003), known as Marília Furiel or just Marília, is a Brazilian footballer who plays as a forward for Cruzeiro.

== Club career ==
Born in Manaquiri, Amazonas, Marília began her career with local side Iranduba. On 5 August 2020, she moved to 3B da Amazônia.

On 8 January 2021, Marília signed with Cruzeiro. On 6 January 2024, after establishing herself as a starter, she renewed her contract for a further season.

== International career ==
On 20 October 2024, Marília was called up to the Brazil national team by head coach Arthur Elias for two friendlies against Colombia. She made her full international debut nine days later, starting and providing the assist to Giovana Queiroz's goal in a 3–1 win at the Estádio Kleber Andrade.

== Honours ==
Cruzeiro

- Campeonato Mineiro de Futebol Feminino: 2023, 2024
