= Jonas Urias =

Brazilian football manager

Personal information
- Full name: Jonas Urias dos Santos
- Date of birth: 17 March 1989 (age 37)
- Place of birth: São Bento do Sapucaí, Brazil

Team information
- Current team: Cruzeiro (women) (head coach)

Managerial career
- Years: Team
- 2010–2015: Centro Olímpico U15 (women)
- 2016: Centro Olímpico (women)
- 2017–2018: Sport Recife (women)
- 2019–2023: Brazil U20 (women)
- 2023–: Cruzeiro (women)

Jonas Urias dos Santos (born 17 March 1989) is a Brazilian football coach, currently in charge of Cruzeiro's women's team.

== Career ==
Born in São Bento do Sapucaí but raised in Pindamonhangaba, both in the São Paulo state, Urias began his career with Centro Olímpico in 2010, as an under-15 coach of the women's team. He remained in that role until 2016, when he replaced Arthur Elias at the helm of the first team.

In February 2017, Urias was named head coach of the women's team of Sport Recife, reestablished in that year. On 20 August 2019, after winning two Campeonato Pernambucano titles, he left to take over the Brazil women's national under-20 team.

On 28 August 2023, Urias left the national team after a third place in the 2022 FIFA U-20 Women's World Cup. On 2 September, he became the new head coach of Cruzeiro's women's team.

In November 2025, Urias was nominated to the IFFHS World's Best Club Coach in women's football.

== Honours ==
Sport Recife

- Campeonato Pernambucano de Futebol Feminino: 2018, 2019

Brazil U20

- South American Under-20 Women's Football Championship: 2022

Cruzeiro

- Campeonato Mineiro de Futebol Feminino: 2023, 2024, 2025
- Conmebol Libertadores Femenina: 2026

Individual

- Campeonato Brasileiro de Futebol Feminino Série A1 Coach of the Year: 2025
