= Letícia Ferreira =

Brazilian professional footballer (born 2000)

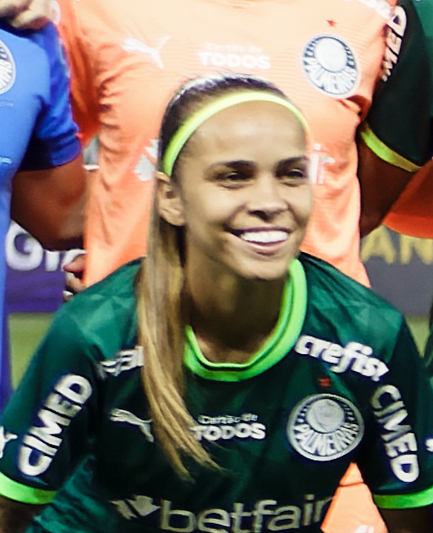
- Letícia as a Palmeiras player in 2023

Personal information
- Full name: Letícia Ferreira Moreno Santos
- Date of birth: 8 November 2000 (age 25)
- Place of birth: São Paulo, Brazil
- Height: 1.68 m (5 ft 6 in)
- Position: Forward

Team information
- Current team: Cruzeiro
- Number: 9

Youth career
- 2015–2017: Tiger Academia

Senior career*
Years	Team	Apps	(Gls)
2018	Chapecoense	1	(2)
2019	Portuguesa	3	(1)
2020–2021	Fluminense	16	(12)
2021–2022	PSV Eindhoven	15	(0)
2022	Fluminense	7	(8)
2023–2024	Palmeiras	45	(21)
2025–	Cruzeiro	28	(26)

International career
2020	Brazil U20		
- * Club domestic league appearances and goals as of 14:13, 10 December 2025 (UTC)

Letícia Ferreira Moreno Santos (born 8 November 2000), known as Letícia Ferreira or just Letícia, is a Brazilian professional footballer who plays as a forward for Cruzeiro.

== Club career ==
Born in Jaraguá, São Paulo, Letícia began her career at Tiger Academia, before signing for Chapecoense in 2018. She moved to Portuguesa in the following year, before joining Fluminense in 2020.

On 9 August 2021, Letícia moved abroad and was presented at PSV Eindhoven. Roughly one year later, she returned to Fluminense, before being announced at Palmeiras on 11 January 2023.

On 9 January 2025, Letícia and 12 other players were presented as Cruzeiro's new signings.

== International career ==
In November 2020, Letícia was called up to the Brazil national under-20 team.

== Honours ==
Palmeiras

- Campeonato Paulista de Futebol Feminino: 2024

Cruzeiro

- Campeonato Mineiro de Futebol Feminino: 2025

Individual

- Campeonato Brasileiro Série A1 Team of the Year: 2025
