= Cruzeiro EC (women) =

Women's football club based in Belo Horizonte, Minas Gerais, Brazil

Cruzeiro
- Full name: Cruzeiro Esporte Clube
- Nickname: Cabulosas
- Founded: 27 February 2019; 7 years ago
- Ground: Arena Gregorão
- Capacity: 1,179
- President: Sérgio Santos Rodrigues
- Head coach: Jonas Urias
- League: Campeonato Brasileiro Série A1; Campeonato Mineiro
- 2025 2025: Série A1, 2nd of 16; Mineiro, 1st of 8 (champions)
Home colours	Away colours	Third colours

Cruzeiro Esporte Clube, commonly known as Cruzeiro or Cabulosas, is a Brazilian women's Association football club, based in the city of Belo Horizonte, Minas Gerais, Brazil. The club won the Campeonato Mineiro de Futebol Feminino four times.

== History ==
On 27 February 2019, after CONMEBOL's demand that the male teams which would play in the 2019 Copa Libertadores needed to have an active women's team, Cruzeiro created their women's football section. The club won the Campeonato Mineiro in their inaugural season, defeating América Mineiro in the final.

== Players ==
=== Current squad ===
As of 12 April 2026.

Note: Flags indicate national team as defined under FIFA eligibility rules; some limited exceptions apply. Players may hold more than one non-FIFA nationality.

No.	Pos.	Nation	Player
1	GK	BRA	Leilane
3	DF	BRA	Tainara
4	DF	BRA	Paloma Maciel
5	MF	COL	Lorena Bedoya
6	MF	BRA	Isabela Capelinha
7	FW	BRA	Vanessinha
8	DF	BRA	Gisseli
9	FW	BRA	Letícia Ferreira
10	FW	BRA	Byanca Brasil
11	FW	COL	Gaby Rodríguez
12	GK	BRA	Camila Rodrigues
14	FW	BRA	Millene Fernandes
17	FW	PAR	Fabiola Sandoval

No.	Pos.	Nation	Player
19	DF	URU	Laura Felipe
20	FW	BRA	Marília Furiel
21	FW	BRA	Milena Ferreira
23	MF	BRA	Rafa Levis
25	DF	BRA	Ketlin
28	FW	BRA	Mari Andrade
33	DF	BRA	Vitória Calhau
55	MF	BRA	Ana Flávia
64	GK	BRA	Cláudia
77	FW	BRA	Ravenna
93	MF	BRA	Pri Back
95	MF	BRA	Gaby Soares
99	DF	BRA	Letícia Alves

== Honours ==
=== Official tournaments ===
Continental
Competitions	Titles	Seasons
Copa Libertadores Femenina	1	2026
State
Competitions	Titles	Seasons
Campeonato Mineiro	4	2019, 2023, 2024, 2025

== See also ==
- Cruzeiro Esporte Clube
- Sada Cruzeiro (volleyball)
