= Três Barras =

Coordinates: 26.1064°S 50.3222°W

- Municipality
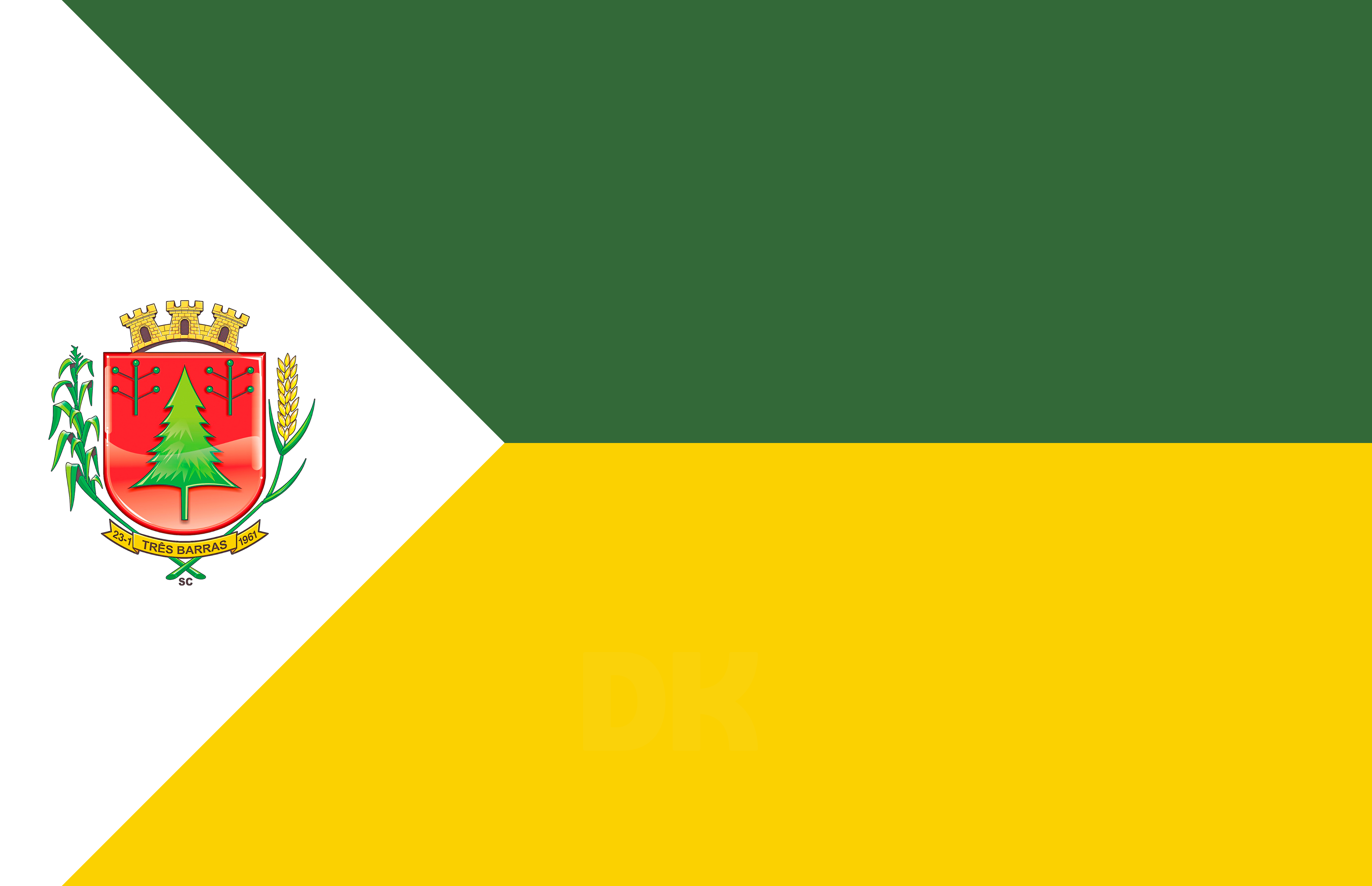
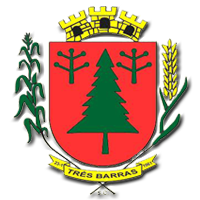
- Flag Coat of arms
- Interactive map of Três Barras
- Country: Brazil
- Region: South
- State: Santa Catarina
- Mesoregion: Norte Catarinense

Population (2020)
  - Total: 19,366
- Time zone: UTC -3

Três Barras is a municipality in the state of Santa Catarina in the South region of Brazil.

== See also ==
- List of municipalities in Santa Catarina
