= Club Atlético Belgrano (women) =

Argentine women's football club

Belgrano (women's)
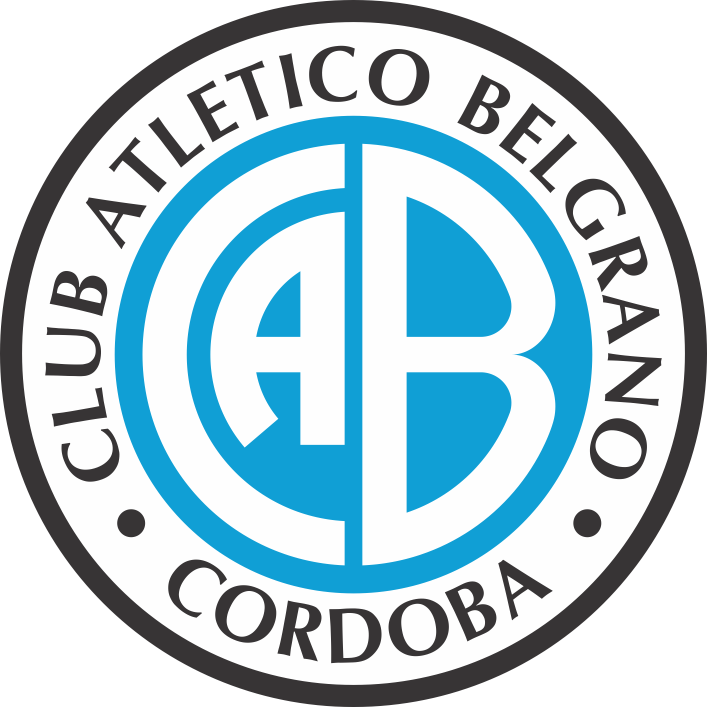
- Full name: Club Atlético Belgrano
- Nickname: Las Piratas (The Pirates)
- Founded: 2001; 25 years ago
- Ground: Estadio Julio César Villagra
- Capacity: 38,000.
- Chairman: Luis Fabián Artime
- Manager: Mariana Sánchez
- League: Campeonato Femenino
- 2025 Apertura: Runner-up
- Website: belgrano.com.ar/femenino
Home colours	Away colours

Club Atlético Belgrano (Spanish pronunciation: [ˈkluβ aˈtletiko βelˈɣɾano]; mostly known simply as Belgrano [belˈɣɾano] or Belgrano de Córdoba [belˈɣɾano ðe ˈkoɾðoβa]) is an Argentine professional women's football club from the city of Córdoba. They are the women's football section of the sports club of the same name and currently play in the Campoeonato Femenino, the first division of women's football in Argentina.

The women's football section of Belgrano was formed in 2001, although official competition already existed. In 2012, it began participating in tournaments organized by the Liga Cordobesa de Fútbol before joining the AFA leagues in 2021.

== History ==
=== Amateur era ===
At the beginning of the 21st century, women's football in Córdoba and the country was far from what it is today. Belgrano's situation was no exception; with the club going through bankruptcy proceedings, the players didn't even have a training ground or opponents, since the Liga Cordobesa de Fútbol didn't require a women's division.

This process was very difficult and required a lot of perseverance. The girls didn't even have proper uniforms and were often considered surplus players from the men's team. During this time, Valeria Herrera and Analía Figueroa stand out as key figures in the team's growth. They organized matches and trips, and opened the club's doors to women's soccer.

It wasn't until 2005 that the LCF organized a Preparation Tournament with the participation of six teams. Belgrano's women's section dominated with a perfect record against the other teams, conceding only two goals and scoring 27. This tournament was largely forgotten, but "Las Piratas" continued to compete, receiving invitations to participate in friendly national tournaments throughout the country.

=== Liga Cordobesa de Fútbol ===
In 2012, the LCF mandated that its clubs have a women's division. This led to the organization of the first provincial women's football tournament.

Belgrano had several years of experience in the division and swept the opening and closing tournaments, being a pioneer and champion of the first two official competitions of women's football in Cordoba.

The "Piratas" became virtually invincible in local tournaments, achieving an undefeated streak of 100 games, losing only two games in regular time over 8 years.

Among the standout players from that great squad were Romina Gómez, Yohana Borgobello, and Betina Soriano, among others.

=== Entry into AFA championships and promotion to the first division ===
In 2021, Belgrano joined the Primera División C, organized by the AFA, once again pioneering the participation of clubs from outside the capital. Among the reinforcements for that season were Pilar Casas, Milagros Cisneros, and Mariana Alisio, who were joined by Valeria Alzapiedi and Sofía Belmar before the start of the tournament, all of them from Talleres; as well as Mayra Acevedo from Universitario, Arianna Reche from Racing, and Noelia Vassarotto from General Paz Juniors, among other players from the Córdoba region.

With Daniela Díaz as coach, the "Piratas" debuted on 4 September 2021, with a 7–0 away victory against San Martín de Burzaco. On 4 December, they were promoted to Primera B after defeating Newell's 3–2 in the semifinal and on December 18 they won their first AFA title after winning the final against Claypole 5–4, with 4 goals from Romina "la Pepa" Gómez, who also became the tournament's top scorer.

The Piratas continued their successful campaign the following year, this time under the leadership of Maximiliano Luján and with the clear intention of achieving promotion to the First Division. They debuted in the Primera B on March 6 with a resounding 16–0 victory against Lima de Zárate, followed by a string of wins that placed the club at the top of the Qualifying Phase table, winning all 10 of their matches without conceding a goal and scoring 55 goals. The solid play continued in the Promotion Phase and, after 19 wins and one draw, the Piratas celebrated their promotion to the First Division with a decisive 6–0 victory against Puerto Nuevo two matches before the end of the tournament and with an 11-point advantage over second place. The match against Puerto Nuevo marked a milestone for women's football, breaking the national attendance record for a women's football match. 28,000 spectators witnessed the masterclass of football from the newly promoted and reigning champions.

== Honours ==
=== National ===
- Campeonato de Fútbol Femenino
  - Winners (1): 2025 Clausura
- Trofeo de Campeones
  - Winners (1): 2025
- Primera División B
  - Winners (1): 2022
- Primera División C
  - Winners (1): 2021

=== Regional ===
- Liga Cordobesa de Fútbol
  - Winners (7): 2012, 2013, 2015, 2016, 2017, 2019, 2021
- Copa Córdoba
  - Winners (3): 2011, 2019, 2021
- Córdoba Cup Internacional
  - Winners (2): 2015, 2016
- Triangular General Deheza
  - Winners (1): 2010
