= América Futebol Clube (MG) (women) =

Women's football club based in Belo Horizonte, Minas Gerais, Brazil

América Mineiro
- Full name: América Futebol Clube
- Nickname: Spartanas
- Founded: 1983; 43 years ago
- Ground: Arena Independência
- Capacity: 23,018
- President: Alencar da Silveira Júnior
- Head coach: Jorge Victor
- League: Campeonato Brasileiro Série A1; Campeonato Mineiro
- 2025 2025: Série A1, 9th of 16; Mineiro, 4th of 6
Home colours	Away colours	Third colours

América Futebol Clube, commonly known as América Mineiro or Spartanas, is a Brazilian women's Association football club, based in the city of Belo Horizonte, Minas Gerais. It is the women's section of América Mineiro. They won the Campeonato Mineiro de Futebol Feminino three times.

== History ==
After having a women's football section in 1983, president Alencar da Silveira Júnior returned the team to an active status in 2015, and presented the squad in July. The club won the Campeonato Mineiro de Futebol Feminino for three consecutive seasons in 2016, 2017 and 2018.

América played in the Campeonato Brasileiro de Futebol Feminino Série A2 since its creation in 2017, and achieved promotion to the Série A1 in June 2023.

== Players ==
=== Current squad ===
As of 12 April 2026.

Note: Flags indicate national team as defined under FIFA eligibility rules; some limited exceptions apply. Players may hold more than one non-FIFA nationality.

No.	Pos.	Nation	Player
2	DF	BRA	Julinha
3	DF	BRA	Duda Nascimento
4	DF	BRA	Maiara
5	MF	BRA	Gaby
6	DF	BRA	Lana
7	MF	BRA	Rafinha
8	MF	BRA	Kaylaine
9	FW	BRA	Dani Ortolan
10	MF	BRA	Luaninha
11	FW	BRA	Radija
12	GK	BRA	Sandy
14	DF	BRA	Alice
15	DF	BRA	Duda Teixeira
16	DF	BRA	Laís

No.	Pos.	Nation	Player
17	DF	BRA	Thaíni
18	DF	BRA	Lorranny
19	FW	BRA	Ket
20	MF	BRA	Emily Dubai
22	GK	BRA	Taluane
23	DF	BRA	Ana Clara
24	DF	BRA	Pâmella
30	DF	BRA	Mimi
31	GK	BRA	Karol Araújo
65	GK	BRA	Tainá
77	FW	BRA	Teté
98	DF	BRA	Olívia
99	FW	BRA	Anna Júlia

== Honours ==
=== Official tournaments ===
State
Competitions	Titles	Seasons
Campeonato Mineiro	3	2016, 2017, 2018

== See also ==
- América Futebol Clube (MG)
