= Campeonato Mineiro de Futebol Feminino =

Women's football league in Minas Gerais, Brazil

- Founded: 1983
- Country: Brazil
- Confederation: FMF
- Promotion to: Brasileiro Série A3
- Current champions: Cruzeiro (4th title) (2025)
- Most championships: Atlético Mineiro (9 titles)
- Current: 2025

The Campeonato Mineiro de Futebol Feminino is the women's football state championship of Minas Gerais State, and is contested since 1983.

== List of champions ==
Following is the list with all recognized titles of Campeonato Mineiro Feminino:

Season	Champions	Runners-up
1983	Atlético Mineiro (1)	Cruzeiro
1984–2004	Not held	
2005	Tupinambás (1)	União de Timóteo
2006	Atlético Mineiro (2)	Tupinambás
2007	Nacional do Carmo (1)	Garra
2008	Iguaçu (1)	Atlético Mineiro
2009	Atlético Mineiro (3)	Iguaçu
2010	Atlético Mineiro (4)	Iguaçu
2011	Atlético Mineiro (5)	Iguaçu
2012	Atlético Mineiro (6)	Nacional do Carmo
2013	Neves (1)	AA Bahia
2014	Santa Cruz (1)	Neves
2015	Ipatinga (1)	América
2016	América (1)	Ipatinga
2017	América (2)	Frigoarnaldo
2018	América (3)	Ipatinga
2019	Cruzeiro (1)	América
2020	Atlético Mineiro (7)	Cruzeiro
2021	Atlético Mineiro (8)	Cruzeiro
2022	Atlético Mineiro (9)	Cruzeiro
2023	Cruzeiro (2)	Atlético Mineiro
2024	Cruzeiro (3)	América
2025	Cruzeiro (4)	América

== Titles by team ==
Teams in bold stills active.

Rank	Club	Winners	Winning years
1	**Atlético Mineiro**	9	1983, 2006, 2009, 2010, 2011, 2012, 2020, 2021, 2022
2	**Cruzeiro**	4	2019, 2023, 2024, 2025
3	**América**	3	2016, 2017, 2018
3	Iguaçu	1	2008
3	**Ipatinga**	1	2015
3	**Nacional do Carmo**	1	2007
3	Neves	1	2013
3	Santa Cruz	1	2014
3	Tupinambás	1	2005

=== By city ===
City	Championships	Clubs
Belo Horizonte	19	Atlético Mineiro (9), Cruzeiro (4), América (3), Nacional do Carmo (1), Santa Cruz (1), Tupinambás (1)
Ipatinga	2	Iguaçu (1), Ipatinga (1)
Ribeirão das Neves	1	Neves (1)
