= 2023 Santos FC (women) season =

Santos
2023 season
- President: Andrés Rueda
- Coach: Kleiton Lima (until 7 September); Bruno Silva (caretaker, 13 September – 25 September) (from 25 September)
- Stadium: Vila Belmiro
- Campeonato Brasileiro: Semifinals
- Campeonato Paulista: Semifinals
- Ladies Cup: 2nd
Home colours	Away colours	Third colours

The 2023 season was Santos FC's 24th season in existence and the club's ninth consecutive season in the top flight of Brazilian football. As well as the Campeonato Brasileiro, the club competed in the Campeonato Paulista.

== Players ==
=== Squad information ===
As of 10 December 2023

N	Name	Pos.	Nat.	Place of Birth	Date of Birth (Age)	Caps	Goals	Signed from	Date signed	Contract End
Goalkeepers
12	Camila Rodrigues	GK	(Brazil)	São Luís (Maranhão)	2 January 2001 (aged 22)	47	0	Iranduba	11 September 2020	31 December 2023
24	Anna Bia	GK	(Brazil)	São Paulo (São Paulo (state))	3 August 2000 (aged 23)	14	0	Bahia	4 February 2022	31 December 2023
34	Michelle	GK	(Brazil)	São Paulo (São Paulo (state))	27 February 2004 (aged 19)	0	0	Youth System	16 May 2022	31 December 2024
42	Jully	GK	(Brazil)	Niterói (Rio de Janeiro (state))	18 April 1999 (aged 24)	6	0	Palmeiras	26 January 2023	31 December 2023
Defenders
2	Tayla	CB	(Brazil)	Praia Grande (São Paulo (state))	9 May 1992 (aged 31)	122	8	Benfica (Portugal)	27 January 2020	31 December 2024
4	Camila Martins	CB	(Brazil)	Recife (Pernambuco)	26 September 1990 (aged 33)	125	8	Shanghai Shengli (China)	11 February 2021	31 December 2023
13	Kelly	CB	(Brazil)	São Paulo (São Paulo (state))	22 June 1987 (aged 36)	186	9	EC São Bernardo	26 January 2023	31 December 2023
16	Raíssa	RB	(Brazil)	—N/a	26 June 2004 (aged 19)	1	0	Youth System	6 December 2022	31 December 2024
17	Giovana	RB	(Brazil)	Catanduva (São Paulo (state))	30 January 1987 (aged 36)	75	5	São Paulo	26 January 2023	31 December 2023
20	Kaká	CB	(Brazil)	Brasília (Federal District (Brazil))	2 August 1999 (aged 24)	50	4	Minas Brasília	4 February 2022	31 December 2023
21	Luciana Ortega	CB	(Panama)	Barcelona (Spain)	10 August 2004 (aged 19)	1	0	Florida West (United States)	31 January 2023	31 December 2023
22	Reina Bonta	CB	(Philippines)	New Haven (United States)	17 April 1999 (aged 24)	24	0	SF Nighthawks (United States)	2 March 2023	31 December 2023
23	Bia Menezes	LB	(Brazil)	São Bernardo do Campo (São Paulo (state))	25 June 1997 (aged 26)	107	4	Flamengo	21 January 2020	31 December 2023
28	Gi Fernandes	RB	(Brazil)	Praia Grande (São Paulo (state))	23 December 2004 (aged 18)	52	6	São Paulo	9 December 2021	30 December 2023
Midfielders
5	Brena	MF	(Brazil)	Rio de Janeiro (Rio de Janeiro (state))	28 October 1996 (aged 27)	167	37	Avaldsnes (Norway)	22 January 2020	31 December 2023
14	Ana Carla	MF	(Brazil)	Vitória (Espírito Santo)	25 June 1994 (aged 29)	53	8	Flamengo	4 February 2022	31 December 2023
18	Júlia	MF	(Brazil)	Encantado (Rio Grande do Sul)	24 November 2001 (aged 22)	51	8	Internacional	13 April 2021	31 December 2023
25	Laura Valverde	MF	(Brazil)	Angra dos Reis (Rio de Janeiro (state))	2 June 2003 (aged 20)	51	2	Youth System	9 December 2021	31 December 2023
26	Vitória Yaya	MF	(Brazil)	Suzano (São Paulo (state))	23 January 2002 (aged 21)	31	5	São Paulo	26 January 2023	31 December 2023
72	Erikinha	MF	(Brazil)	São Paulo (São Paulo (state))	23 November 1987 (aged 36)	318	35	Avaldsnes (Norway)	21 January 2020	31 December 2024
Forwards
7	Ketlen	FW	(Brazil)	Rio Fortuna (Santa Catarina (state))	7 January 1992 (aged 31)	334	192	Boston Breakers (United States)	20 January 2021	31 December 2023
8	Jane	FW	(Brazil)	Vassouras (Rio de Janeiro (state))	17 November 1992 (aged 31)	60	3	Grêmio	4 February 2022	31 December 2023
9	Jourdan Ziff	FW	(United States)	Los Angeles (California)	17 December 1997 (aged 25)	19	5	NJS (Finland)	21 March 2023	31 December 2023
10	Thaisinha	FW	(Brazil)	São Paulo (São Paulo (state))	20 January 1993 (aged 30)	162	76	HS Red Angels (South Korea)	21 January 2022	31 December 2023
11	Cristiane	FW	(Brazil)	Osasco (São Paulo (state))	15 May 1985 (aged 38)	140	120	São Paulo	23 January 2020	31 December 2024
19	Isa Viana	FW	(Brazil)	Barueri (São Paulo (state))	20 April 2005 (aged 18)	1	0	Youth System	17 June 2023	31 December 2024
29	Taina Maranhão	FW	(Brazil)	Criciúma (Santa Catarina (state))	18 August 2004 (aged 19)	25	3	Cruzeiro	26 January 2023	31 December 2023
77	Fabi Simões	FW	(Brazil)	Salvador (Bahia)	4 August 1989 (aged 34)	37	10	Internacional	26 January 2023	31 December 2024

Source: SantosFC.com.br (for appearances and goals), FPF (for contracts).

=== Appearances and goals ===
No.	Pos.	Nat	Name	Brasileirão		Paulista		Ladies Cup		Total	
No.	Pos.	Nat	Name	Apps	Goals	Apps	Goals	Apps	Goals	Apps	Goals
24	GK	(Brazil)	Anna Bia	0	0	1	0	2+1	0	4	0
12	GK	(Brazil)	Camila Rodrigues	17	0	9	0	1	0	27	0
42	GK	(Brazil)	Jully	1+1	0	3	0	1	0	6	0
15	DF	(Argentina)	Adriana Sachs	0+1	1	1	0	0	0	2	1
23	DF	(Brazil)	Bia Menezes	16	1	11+1	0	4	1	32	2
4	DF	(Brazil)	Camila Martins	9+2	1	4+2	0	0	0	17	1
3	DF	(Argentina)	Eliana Stábile	2+5	0	1+2	0	0	0	10	0
28	DF	(Brazil)	Gi Fernandes	15	1	5+2	2	2	0	24	2
17	DF	(Brazil)	Giovana	0+8	1	2+1	0	0	0	11	1
20	DF	(Brazil)	Kaká	11+4	1	7+2	1	4	0	28	2
13	DF	(Brazil)	Kelly	0+1	0	0+4	0	0+1	0	6	0
21	DF	(Panama)	Luciana Ortega	0+1	0	0	0	0	0	1	0
16	DF	(Brazil)	Raíssa	0	0	0+1	0	0	0	1	0
22	DF	(Philippines)	Reina Bonta	11	0	7+2	0	2+2	0	24	0
2	DF	(Brazil)	Tayla	5+2	0	7+4	2	4	0	22	2
14	MF	(Brazil)	Ana Carla	4+9	0	6+2	0	2	1	23	1
5	MF	(Brazil)	Brena	17	1	8+3	3	4	0	32	4
72	MF	(Brazil)	Erikinha	1+3	1	5+3	0	0+1	0	13	1
18	MF	(Brazil)	Júlia	0+1	0	2+1	0	0+2	0	6	0
25	MF	(Brazil)	Laura Valverde	2+6	0	2+3	0	0	0	13	0
26	MF	(Brazil)	Vitória Yaya	15+1	3	11	2	2+2	0	31	5
27	FW	(Brazil)	Bianca Gomes	0+6	1	1+4	1	0	0	11	2
15	FW	(Brazil)	Camile Abreu	0	0	0	0	0+2	0	2	0
11	FW	(Brazil)	Cristiane	16	8	9+1	5	4	2	30	15
77	FW	(Brazil)	Fabi Simões	13+3	1	8+4	0	0	0	28	1
19	FW	(Brazil)	Isa Viana	0	0	0+1	0	0	0	1	0
8	FW	(Brazil)	Jane Tavares	0+13	0	6+6	1	2+2	0	29	1
9	FW	(United States)	Jourdan Ziff	2+6	2	4+5	3	0+2	0	19	5
7	FW	(Brazil)	Ketlen	18	8	10+3	5	4	4	35	17
29	FW	(Brazil)	Taina Maranhão	6+8	2	7+2	1	2	0	25	3
10	FW	(Brazil)	Thaisinha	17	3	6+4	1	4	0	31	4

Last updated: 10 December 2023
Source: Match reports in Competitive matches, Soccerway

=== Goalscorers ===
Ran	No.	Pos	Nat	Name	Brasileirão	Paulista	Ladies Cup	Total
1	7	FW	(Brazil)	Ketlen	8	5	4	17
2	11	FW	(Brazil)	Cristiane	8	5	2	15
3	26	MF	(Brazil)	Vitória Yaya	3	2	0	5
3	9	FW	(United States)	Jourdan Ziff	2	3	0	5
4	5	MF	(Brazil)	Brena	1	3	0	4
4	10	FW	(Brazil)	Thaisinha	3	1	0	4
5	28	RB	(Brazil)	Gi Fernandes	1	2	0	3
5	29	FW	(Brazil)	Taina Maranhão	2	1	0	3
6	23	LB	(Brazil)	Bia Menezes	1	0	1	2
6	27	FW	(Brazil)	Bianca Gomes	1	1	0	2
6	20	CB	(Brazil)	Kaká	1	1	0	2
6	2	CB	(Brazil)	Tayla	0	2	0	2
7	15	CB	(Argentina)	Adriana Sachs	1	0	0	1
7	14	MF	(Brazil)	Ana Carla	0	0	1	1
7	4	CB	(Brazil)	Camila Martins	1	0	0	1
7	72	MF	(Brazil)	Erikinha	1	0	0	1
7	77	FW	(Brazil)	Fabi Simões	1	0	0	1
7	17	RB	(Brazil)	Giovana	1	0	0	1
7	8	FW	(Brazil)	Jane	0	1	0	1
Total					36	27	8	63

Last updated: 10 December 2023
Source: Match reports in Competitive matches, Soccerway

=== Disciplinary record ===
N	Nat	Pos	Name	Brasileirão			Paulista			Ladies Cup			Total		
N	Nat	Pos	Name	Yellow card	(yellow card) (yellow-red card)	Red card	Yellow card	(yellow card) (yellow-red card)	Red card	Yellow card	(yellow card) (yellow-red card)	Red card	Yellow card	(yellow card) (yellow-red card)	Red card
29	(Brazil)	FW	Taina Maranhão	1	0	1	1	1	0	1	0	0	3	1	1
5	(Brazil)	MF	Brena	4	0	0	3	0	0	0	0	0	7	0	0
10	(Brazil)	FW	Thaisinha	3	0	0	4	0	0	0	0	0	7	0	0
2	(Brazil)	CB	Tayla	5	0	0	1	0	0	0	0	0	6	0	0
23	(Brazil)	LB	Bia Menezes	4	0	0	1	0	0	0	0	0	5	0	0
4	(Brazil)	CB	Camila Martins	4	0	0	1	0	0	0	0	0	5	0	0
20	(Brazil)	CB	Kaká	1	0	0	3	0	0	1	0	0	5	0	0
22	(Philippines)	CB	Reina Bonta	3	0	0	2	0	0	0	0	0	5	0	0
26	(Brazil)	MF	Vitória Yaya	3	0	0	1	0	0	1	0	0	5	0	0
11	(Brazil)	FW	Cristiane	3	0	0	0	0	0	1	0	0	4	0	0
23	(Brazil)	RB	Gi Fernandes	1	0	0	2	0	0	0	0	0	3	0	0
27	(Brazil)	FW	Bianca Gomes	2	0	0	0	0	0	0	0	0	2	0	0
3	(Argentina)	CB	Eliana Stábile	1	0	0	1	0	0	0	0	0	2	0	0
72	(Brazil)	MF	Erikinha	1	0	0	1	0	0	0	0	0	2	0	0
7	(Brazil)	FW	Ketlen	1	0	0	1	0	0	0	0	0	2	0	0
14	(Brazil)	MF	Ana Carla	0	0	0	1	0	0	0	0	0	1	0	0
12	(Brazil)	GK	Camila Rodrigues	1	0	0	0	0	0	0	0	0	1	0	0
77	(Brazil)	FW	Fabi Simões	1	0	0	0	0	0	0	0	0	1	0	0
8	(Brazil)	FW	Jane	1	0	0	0	0	0	0	0	0	1	0	0
TOTALS				38	0	1	23	1	0	4	0	0	65	1	1

Last updated: 10 December 2023

Source: Match reports in Competitive matches, Soccerway

(yellow card) = Number of bookings; (yellow card) (yellow-red card) = Number of sending offs after a second yellow card; (red card) = Number of sending offs by a direct red card.

== Transfers ==
=== Transfers in ===
N.	Pos.	Name	Age	Moving from	Source
77	FW	(Brazil) Fabi Simões	33	Internacional	
26	MF	(Brazil) Vitória Yaya	20	São Paulo	
27	FW	(Brazil) Bianca Gomes	32	Corinthians	
17	RB	(Brazil) Giovana	35	São Paulo	
42	GK	(Brazil) Jully	23	Palmeiras	
29	FW	(Brazil) Taina Maranhão	18	Cruzeiro	
15	CB	(Argentina) Adriana Sachs	29	Boca Juniors (Argentina)	
13	CB	(Brazil) Kelly	35	São Bernardo	
9	FW	(United States) Jourdan Ziff	25	NJS (Finland)	
22	CB	(Philippines) Reina Bonta	23	San Francisco Nighthawks (United States)	

=== Transfers out ===
N.	Pos.	Name	Age	Moving to	Source
32	AM	(Brazil) Fernanda	29	Corinthians	
22	CB	(Brazil) Sassá	19	Palmeiras	
21	AM	(Brazil) Nicole Marussi	18	Corinthians	
27	FW	(Brazil) Analuyza	18	Internacional	
1	GK	(Brazil) Vivi Holzel	33	Grêmio	
19	CB	(Brazil) Isa Matos	20	Coritiba	
6	CB	(Brazil) Jajá	28	Athletico Paranaense	
17	MF	(Brazil) Marzia Coutinho	18	Internacional	
29	ST	(Brazil) Gadu	25	Fluminense	
9	RB	(Brazil) Giovanna Oliveira	30	Changchun Yatai (China)	
15	CB	(Argentina) Adriana Sachs	29	Racing (Argentina)	
3	LB	(Argentina) Eliana Stábile	29	Boca Juniors (Argentina)	
27	FW	(Brazil) Bianca Gomes	33	Palmeiras	

=== Suspensions served ===
Date	Matches Missed	Player	Reason	Opponents Missed	Competition
16 April	1	Taina Maranhão	(red card) vs Avaí	São Paulo (A)	Campeonato Brasileiro
16 April	1	Reina Bonta	3x (yellow card)	São Paulo (A)	Campeonato Brasileiro
30 April	1	Camila Martins	3x (yellow card)	Cruzeiro (A)	Campeonato Brasileiro
30 April	1	Bia Menezes	3x (yellow card)	Cruzeiro (A)	Campeonato Brasileiro
6 May	1	Vitória Yaya	3x (yellow card)	Corinthians (A)	Campeonato Brasileiro
21 May	1	Cristiane	3x (yellow card)	Ceará (A)	Campeonato Brasileiro
27 May	1	Tayla	3x (yellow card)	Bahia (H)	Campeonato Brasileiro
5 June	1	Brena	3x (yellow card)	Real Ariquemes (A)	Campeonato Brasileiro
5 June	1	Thaisinha	3x (yellow card)	Real Ariquemes (A)	Campeonato Brasileiro
30 August	1	Thaisinha	3x (yellow card)	Pinda (H)	Campeonato Paulista
30 August	1	Kaká	3x (yellow card)	Pinda (H)	Campeonato Paulista

Source: Match reports in Competitive matches

== Competitions ==
=== Campeonato Brasileiro ===
==== Results summary ====
Overall								Home						Away					
Pld	W	D	L	GF	GA	GD	Pts	W	D	L	GF	GA	GD	W	D	L	GF	GA	GD
19	12	2	5	39	17	+22	38	6	1	2	18	8	+10	6	1	3	21	9	+12

Source: Soccerway

==== First stage ====
Pos	Team	Pld	W	D	L	GF	GA	GD	Pts	Qualification or relegation
2	Palmeiras	15	11	2	2	48	14	+34	35	Advance to Quarter-finals
3	Ferroviária	15	11	1	3	38	16	+22	34	Advance to Quarter-finals
4	Santos	15	10	2	3	32	10	+22	32	Advance to Quarter-finals
5	Flamengo/Marinha	15	10	1	4	23	14	+9	31	Advance to Quarter-finals
6	Internacional	15	9	1	5	25	16	+9	28	Advance to Quarter-finals

Source: CBF

===== Matches =====
24 February 1	Santos	3–0	Flamengo/Marinha	Santos
20:00 UTC-03:00	Fabi Simões 22'; Thaisinha 45+2'; Cristiane 54'	Report	(yellow card) 84' Thaís Regina	Stadium: Vila Belmiro; Attendance: 3,863; Referee: Marianna Nanni Batalha

4 March 2	Athletico Paranaense	1–1	Santos	Curitiba
15:00 UTC-03:00	Nathália 5'; Jajá Amorim (yellow card) 24'; Renatinha (yellow card) 64'; Joyce (yellow card) 66'; Paloma Maciel (yellow card) 90+11'	Report	(yellow card) 45+1' Camila Martins; (yellow card) 70' Erikinha; 89' Bianca Gomes; (yellow card) 90+8' Tayla	Stadium: CT do Caju; Attendance: 0 Referee: Robson Babinski

12 March 3	Santos	0–1	Ferroviária	Santos
11:00 UTC-03:00	Brena (yellow card) 60'; Taina Maranhão (yellow card) 69'	Report	(yellow card) 36' Karina; 79' Patrícia Sochor	Stadium: Vila Belmiro; Referee: Pablo Rodrigo Soares de Oliveira

19 March 4	Real Brasília	0–4	Santos	Vila Planalto
15:00 UTC-03:00	Laine (yellow card) 44'; Sassá (yellow card) 90+2'	Report	6', 79' (yellow card) 63' Cristiane; 27', 52' Ketlen; (yellow card) 82' Brena	Stadium: Defelê; Attendance: 118; Referee: Marcello Ruda Neves Ramos da Costa

27 March 5	Santos	1–1	Palmeiras	Santos
20:00 UTC-03:00	Thaisinha 11' (yellow card) 60'; Fabi Simões (yellow card) 15'; Reina Bonta (yellow card) 27'; Ketlen (yellow card) 43'; Camila Martins (yellow card) 81'; Vitória Yaya (yellow card) 89'	Report	(yellow card) 29' Yamila Rodríguez; 33' Bia Zaneratto; (yellow card) 54' Duda Santos; (yellow card) 71' Camilinha; (yellow card) 71' Sorriso	Stadium: Vila Belmiro; Attendance: 1,932; Referee: Edina Alves Batista

1 April 6	Grêmio	1–0	Santos	Eldorado do Sul
11:00 UTC-03:00	Dani Ortolan 18'	Report	(yellow card) 45+1' Kaká; (yellow card) 54' Bia Menezes; (yellow card) 87' Reina Bonta; (yellow card) 90+3' Bianca Gomes	Stadium: Airton Ferreira da Silva; Attendance: 0 Referee: Lucas Guimaraes Rechatiko Horn

16 April 7	Santos	4–0	Avaí	Santos
11:00 UTC-03:00	Reina Bonta (yellow card) 2'; Vitória Yaya (yellow card) 25' (goal) 48'; Ketlen 32'; Kaká 47'; Taina Maranhão (red card) 75'; Giovana 83'	Report	(yellow card) 34' Siméia	Stadium: Vila Belmiro; Attendance: 1,387; Referee: Fabiano Monteiro dos Santos

23 April 8	São Paulo	0–1	Santos	Cotia
11:00 UTC-03:00	Dudinha (yellow card) 40'	Report	(yellow card) 12' Bia Menezes; 90+2' Jourdan Ziff; (yellow card) 90+4' Gi Fernandes	Stadium: CT Laudo Natel; Attendance: 0 Referee: Marianna Nanni Batalha

30 April 9	Santos	2–1	Internacional	Santos
15:00 UTC-03:00	Cristiane 13'; Camila Martins (yellow card) 63'; Brena 68'; Bia Menezes (yellow card) 90+2'	Report	16' Priscilla; (yellow card) 23' Tamara; (yellow card) 45' Fabiola Sandoval; (yellow card) 72' Bruna Benites	Stadium: Vila Belmiro; Attendance: 3,152; Referee: Fernanda dos Santos Ignacio de Souza

6 May 10	Cruzeiro	2–3	Santos	Belo Horizonte
19:00 UTC-03:00	Byanca Brasil 3'; Rafa Andrade (yellow card) 47' (goal) 76'; Luana Guitarrari (yellow card) 55'; Marília (yellow card) 63'; Camila Arrieta (yellow card) 90+7'	Report	(yellow card) 34' Eliana Stábile; (yellow card) 45+1' Tayla; (yellow card) 45+4' Vitória Yaya; 65' Taina Maranhão; 81', 86' Ketlen; (yellow card) 87' Bianca Gomes; (yellow card) 90+9' Cristiane	Stadium: Alterosas; Attendance: 296; Referee: Francielly Fernanda Lima de Castro

14 May 11	Corinthians	1–0	Santos	São Paulo
11:00 UTC-03:00	Jaqueline Ribeiro (yellow card) 28'; Jheniffer 47'; Giovanna Campiolo (yellow card) 47' (yellow-red card) 90+1'	Report	(yellow card) 22' Camila Martins	Stadium: Parque São Jorge; Attendance: 4,613; Referee: Fernanda dos Santos Ignacio de Souza

21 May 12	Santos	2–0	Atlético Mineiro	Santos
15:00 UTC-03:00	Vitória Yaya 15'; Thaisinha (yellow card) 45'; Cristiane (yellow card) 90+1' (goal) 90+6'	Report	(yellow card) 70' Karol Bermúdez; (yellow card) 73' Katielle	Stadium: Vila Belmiro; Attendance: 1,779; Referee: Adeli Mara Monteiro

27 May 13	Ceará	1–6	Santos	Itaitinga
15:00 UTC-03:00	Marcia 44'; Ester (yellow card) 65'; Guaciara (yellow card) 90+2'	Report	4' Jourdan Ziff; 10' Gi Fernandes; 11' Erikinha; (yellow card) 47' Tayla; 50' Adriana Sachs; 57' Taina Maranhão; 67' Ketlen	Stadium: Cidade Vozão; Attendance: 0 Referee: Ingrede Santos

5 June 14	Santos	2–1	Bahia	Barueri
15:00 UTC-03:00	Bia Menezes (yellow card) 10'; Cristiane 50', 57' (pen.); Brena (yellow card) 60'; Thaisinha (yellow card) 75'	Report	(yellow card) 56' Dan; (yellow card) 74' Suelen; 86' Thayná; (yellow card) 88' Aila; (yellow card) 90+1' Letícia; (yellow card) 90+8' Nathane	Stadium: Arena Barueri; Referee: Michel de Camargo

12 June 15	Real Ariquemes	0–3 (w/o)	Santos	Porto Velho
14:00 UTC-04:00		Report		Stadium: Aluizão; Referee: Angleison Marcos Vieira Monteiro

==== Knockout stage ====
===== Quarter-final =====
18 June 1st Leg	Flamengo/Marinha	1–3	Santos	Volta Redonda
16:00 UTC-03:00	Leidiane 40'; Darlene (yellow card) 47'	Report	3' Vitória Yaya; 73' Cristiane; 78' Thaisinha; (yellow card) 88' Jane	Stadium: Raulino de Oliveira; Referee: Andreza Helena de Siqueira

25 June 2nd Leg	Santos	4–1 (7–2 agg.)	Flamengo/Marinha	Santos
10:00 UTC-03:00	Ketlen 22', 90+1'; Bia Menezes 54'; Camila Rodrigues (yellow card) 75'; Camila Martins 90+3'	Report	18' (yellow card) 30' Leidiane; (yellow card) 36' Cris; (yellow card) 52' Daiane	Stadium: Vila Belmiro; Referee: Deborah Cecilia Cruz Correia

===== Semifinal =====
27 August 1st Leg	Santos	0–3	Corinthians	Santos
10:30 UTC-03:00	Brena (yellow card) 60'; Tayla (yellow card) 61'	Report	17', 36' Jheniffer; 31' (yellow card) 76' Victória Albuquerque; (yellow card) 65' Luana; (red card) 88' Miriã; (yellow card) 90+3' Tamires; (red card) 90+7' Gabi Portilho; (yellow card) 90+12' Tarciane	Stadium: Vila Belmiro; Attendance: 4,471; Referee: Deborah Cecilia Cruz Correia

3 September 2nd Leg	Corinthians	2–0 (5–0 agg.)	Santos	São Paulo
10:30 UTC-03:00	Tarciane (yellow card) 32'; Duda Sampaio 63'; Fernanda 88'	Report	(yellow card) 19' Tayla	Stadium: Parque São Jorge; Referee: Charly Wendy Straub Deretti

=== Campeonato Paulista ===
==== Results summary ====
Overall								Home						Away					
Pld	W	D	L	GF	GA	GD	Pts	W	D	L	GF	GA	GD	W	D	L	GF	GA	GD
13	9	2	2	27	10	+17	29	4	1	2	15	8	+7	5	1	0	12	2	+10

Source: Soccerway

==== First stage ====
Pos	Team	Pld	W	D	L	GF	GA	GD	Pts	Qualification
1	Corinthians	11	10	1	0	52	5	+47	31	Advance to Semi-final
2	Santos	11	8	2	1	24	7	+17	26	Advance to Semi-final
3	São Paulo	11	8	0	3	28	6	+22	24	Advance to Semi-final
4	Palmeiras	11	6	4	1	37	9	+28	22	Advance to Semi-final
5	Ferroviaria	11	6	2	3	35	12	+23	20	

Updated to match(es) played on 14 September 2023. Source: Globo Esporte
Rules for classification: 1) points; 2) wins; 3) goal difference; 4) goals scored; 5) head-to-head results (only between 2 teams); 6) fewest red cards; 7) fewest yellow cards; 8) draw.

===== Matches =====
3 May 1	SKA Brasil	0–3	Santos	Santana do Parnaíba
17:00 UTC-03:00			30' Tayla; 72' Jourdan Ziff; 90+2' Bianca Gomes	Stadium: Gabriel Marques da Silva; Referee: Marianna Nanni Batalha

11 May 2	Santos	0–0	Palmeiras	Santos
19:00 UTC-03:00	Kaká (yellow card) 25'; Thaisinha (yellow card) 87'; Camila Martins (yellow card) 90+2'		(yellow card) 11' Flávia Mota; (yellow card) 37' Lorena Benítez	Stadium: Vila Belmiro; Referee: Matheus Delgado Candançan

18 May 3	São José	0–1	Santos	São José dos Campos
19:00 UTC-03:00	Vitória Pelé (yellow card) 23'; Mariana Andrade (yellow card) 45'; Suyane (yellow card) 58'		(yellow card) 44' Kaká; (yellow card) 51' Ana Carla; 90+2' Brena	Stadium: Martins Pereira; Referee: João Vitor Gobi

24 May 4	São Paulo	1–2	Santos	Barueri
19:00 UTC-03:00	Aline Milene 17'		(yellow card) 35' Reina Bonta; (yellow card) 69' Bia Menezes; (yellow card) 72' (goal) 90+2' Vitória Yaya; (yellow card) 84' Eliana Stábile; 90+4' Jane	Stadium: Arena Barueri; Referee: Gabriel Henrique Meira Bispo

1 June 5	Santos	0–1	Corinthians	Santos
21:30 UTC-03:00			40' Gabi Portilho; (yellow card) 82' Andressa Pereira	Stadium: Vila Belmiro; Referee: Thiago Luís Scarascati

8 June 6	Santos	3–2	Ferroviária	Santo André
19:00 UTC-03:00	Ketlen (yellow card) 27' (goal) 47'; Cristiane 36'; Thaisinha (yellow card) 62'; Brena (yellow card) 68'; Vitória Yaya 78'		(yellow card) 64' Suzane Pires; (yellow card) 72' Daiane Rodrigues; (yellow card) 64' Day Silva; 86', 90+6' Patrícia Sochor	Stadium: Bruno José Daniel; Referee: Marianna Nanni Batalha

21 June 7	EC São Bernardo	0–4	Santos	Santo André
17:00 UTC-03:00	Jeniffer Sampaio (yellow card) 61'		26', 47' Cristiane; 68' Kaká; 90+2' Gi Fernandes	Stadium: Bruno José Daniel; Referee: Guilherme Francisco Rosário

28 June 8	Santos	2–1	Taubaté	Barueri
19:00 UTC-03:00	Ketlen 74'; Jourdan Ziff 83'	Report	(yellow card) 63' Mariana Domingues; 70' Daiane; (yellow card) 80' Tatá	Stadium: Arena Barueri; Referee: Gabriel Henrique Meira Bispo

23 August 9	Santos	3–0	Realidade Jovem	Santo André
19:00 UTC-03:00	Gi Fernandes 15'; Jourdan Ziff 27'; Taina Maranhão 34'			Stadium: Bruno José Daniel; Referee: Adeli Monteiro

30 August 10	Red Bull Bragantino	1–1	Santos	Santana de Parnaíba
19:00 UTC-03:00	Isadora Amaral 57' (yellow card) 86'; Lelê (yellow card) 77'		(yellow card) 36' Erikinha; (yellow card) 67' Gi Fernandes; 80' (yellow card) 87' Thaisinha; (yellow card) 88' Brena; (yellow card) 90+2' Kaká; (yellow card) 90+5' Taina Maranhão	Stadium: Gabriel Marques da Silva; Referee: Fagson Junior dos Santos Silva

6 September 11	Santos	5–1	Pinda	Santos
19:00 UTC-03:00	Tayla 11'; Ketlen 14', 58'; Reina Bonta (yellow card) 40'; Cristiane 42'; Brena 49'		(yellow card) 15' Júlia Becker; 37' (yellow card) 51' Puella	Stadium: Vila Belmiro; Referee: Fernanda dos Santos Ignacio de Souza

===== Semifinal =====
6 November 1st Leg	São Paulo	0–1	Santos	Barueri
19:00 UTC-03:00	Maressa (yellow card) 48'		(yellow card) 62' Thaisinha; (yellow card) 66' Tayla; 81' (yellow card) 90+3' Brena	Stadium: Arena Barueri; Attendance: 418; Referee: Marianna Nanni Batalha

13 November 2nd Leg	Santos	2–3 (3–3 agg.) (2–4 p)	São Paulo	Santos
20:30 UTC-03:00	Ketlen 16'; Cristiane 25'; Taina Maranhão (yellow card) 65' (yellow-red card) 90+7'; Gi Fernandes (yellow card) 83'	Report	22' Aline Milene; (yellow card) 45' (goal) 50' Glaucia; (yellow card) 45+3' Rafa Mineira; (yellow card) 67' Fe Palermo; 90+8' Ana Alice	Stadium: Vila Belmiro; Attendance: 5,150; Referee: Matheus Delgado Candançan
	Penalties
	Cristiane (penalty missed); Thaisinha (penalty missed); Bia Menezes (penalty scored); Tayla (penalty scored)		(penalty scored) Maressa; (penalty scored) Micaelly; (penalty scored) Vivian; (penalty scored) Pardal

=== Ladies Cup ===
==== First stage ====
Group B
Pos	Team	Pld	W	D	L	GF	GA	GD	Pts
1	Santos	3	2	1	0	8	2	+6	7
2	Flamengo	3	2	1	0	7	4	+3	7
3	Paraguay	3	1	0	2	7	11	−4	3
4	Ferroviária	3	0	0	3	4	9	−5	0

Updated to match(es) played on 8 December 2023. Source: Globo Esporte

===== Matches =====
4 December 1	Santos	5–1	Paraguay	Santo André
20:00 UTC-03:00	Cristiane 9', 82'; Ana Carla 27'; Ketlen 38', 78'	Report	29' Garay; (red card) 30' Saleb	Stadium: Bruno José Daniel; Referee: Adeli Mara Monteiro

6 December 2	Flamengo	1–1	Santos	Santo André
15:30 UTC-03:00	Isadora Freitas (yellow card) 45+3'; Gisseli (yellow card) 65'; Laysa 76'	Report	8' Ketlen; (yellow card) 90+2' Cristiane	Stadium: Bruno José Daniel; Referee: Marianna Nanni Batalha

8 December 3	Ferroviária	0–2	Santos	Santo André
18:30 UTC-03:00	Aninha Hansen (yellow card) 36'; Ingryd (yellow card) 53'; Nicoly (yellow card) 70'; Eudimilla (red card) 89'	Report	24' Ketlen; (yellow card) 45+2' Vitória Yaya; (yellow card) 46' Kaká; 90+6' Bia Menezes	Stadium: Bruno José Daniel; Referee: Pablo Rodrigo Soares de Oliveira

==== Final ====
10 December	Internacional	1–0	Santos	São Paulo
16:00 UTC-03:00	Belén Aquino 49'; Letícia Monteiro (yellow card) 59'	Report	(yellow card) 46' Taina Maranhão	Stadium: Canindé; Referee: Edina Alves Batista

== See also ==
- 2023 Santos FC season
