= 2023 Campeonato Paulista de Futebol Feminino =

Women's football competition in Brazil

Campeonato Paulista de Futebol Feminino
- Season: 2023
- Dates: 3 May – 26 November 2023
- Champions: Corinthians
- Matches: 72
- Goals: 280 (3.89 per match)
- Top goalscorer: (Brazil) Victória (10 goals)

The Paulista Football Championship of 2023 is the 31st edition of this championship women's football organized by the Paulista Football Federation (FPF). Played between May and November, the competition has twelve participants.

== Format ==
The 2023 Campeonato Paulista de Futebol Feminino has been held in three stages:

In the first stage, the twelve teams have been placed in a single group. Each team in the group has been played each other, and the four teams at the top of the table advance to the semifinals. The teams that finish 5th through 8th place will compete in the Copa Paulista.

In the semifinal phase, the top 4 teams will be placed in two groups of two, with the first group containing the 2nd and 3rd placed teams and the second group containing the first and fourth placed teams. Each team will play one home match and one away match. The teams from each group with the most points after two matches will qualify for the finals. The semifinal groups will follow the same tiebreaker criteria as the group stage.

The final phase will be disputed by the top finishers of the two semifinal groups. The two teams each will play a home and away match to determine the winner. The final group phase will follow the same tiebreaker criteria as the semifinal phase and the group stage.

=== Tiebreaker criteria ===
In the case of tie between two and more teams the following criteria will be used:

- Number of wins
- Goal difference
- Goals Scored
- Fewer red cards received
- Fewer yellow cards received
- Drawing of lots

== Teams ==
Team	City	Manager	2022 result
Corinthians	São Paulo	(Brazil) Arthur Elias	5th
EC São Bernardo	São Bernardo do Campo	(Brazil) Prisco Palumbo	8th
Ferroviaria	Araraquara	(Brazil) Jéssica Lima	4th
Palmeiras	São Paulo	(Brazil) Ricardo Belli	1st
Pinda	Pindamonhangaba	(Brazil) Marcos Derrico	10th
Realidade Jovem	São José do Rio Preto	(Brazil) Carlos Ferraz	11th
Red Bull Bragantino	Bragança Paulista	(Brazil) Humberto Simão	6th
Santos	Santos	(Brazil) Bruno Silva	2nd
São José	São José dos Campos	(Brazil) Adilson Galdino	9th
São Paulo	São Paulo	(Brazil) Thiago Viana	3rd
SKA Brasil	Santana de Parnaíba	(Brazil) Marcos Mancha	1st (Divisão Especial)
Taubaté	Taubaté	(Brazil) Arismar Júnior	7th

Source: "Guia do Paulistão Feminino" (PDF). FPF (in Portuguese).

== Standings ==
Pos	Team	Pld	W	D	L	GF	GA	GD	Pts	Qualification
1	Corinthians	11	10	1	0	52	5	+47	31	Advance to Semi-final
2	Santos	11	8	2	1	24	7	+17	26	Advance to Semi-final
3	São Paulo	11	8	0	3	28	6	+22	24	Advance to Semi-final
4	Palmeiras	11	6	4	1	37	9	+28	22	Advance to Semi-final
5	Ferroviaria	11	6	2	3	35	12	+23	20	
6	RB Bragantino	11	5	3	3	20	11	+9	18	
7	Taubaté	11	4	2	5	17	15	+2	14	
8	São José	11	3	4	4	16	16	0	13	
9	Realidade Jovem	11	2	1	8	8	43	−35	7	
10	Pinda	11	1	2	8	7	30	−23	5	
11	EC São Bernardo	11	1	1	9	8	34	−26	4	
12	SKA Brasil	11	1	0	10	5	69	−64	3	

Updated to match(es) played on 14 September 2023. Source: Globo Esporte
Rules for classification: 1) points; 2) wins; 3) goal difference; 4) goals scored; 5) head-to-head results (only between 2 teams); 6) fewest red cards; 7) fewest yellow cards; 8) draw.

== Bracket ==
Semifinals
1	Corinthians	1	8	9
4	Palmeiras	0	0	0
2	Santos	1	2	3 (2)
3	São Paulo	0	3	3 (4)

Finals
1	Corinthians	1	4	5
3	São Paulo	2	1	3

== Semifinals ==
=== Semi-finals ===
Team 1	Agg.	Team 2	1st leg	2nd leg
Corinthians	9-0	Palmeiras	1-0	8-0
Santos	3-3 (2–4)	São Paulo	1-0	2-3

4 November 2023
11:00

Palmeiras	0–1	Corinthians
	Report	45+1' Mariza

Jayme Cintra, Jundiaí
Attendance: 1,246
Referee: Edina Alves Batista
12 November 2023
11:00

Corinthians	8–0	Palmeiras
Duda Sampaio 3'; Luana 15'; Gabi Portilho 43'; Victória 49'; Millene 51'; Mariza 63'; Jheniffer 68'; Miriã 80'	Report

Arena Corinthians, São Paulo
Attendance: 24,100
Referee: João Vitor Gobi

6 November 2023
19:00

São Paulo	0–1	Santos
	Report	81' Brena

Arena Barueri, Barueri
Attendance: 418
Referee: Mariana Nanni Batalha
13 November 2023
20:30

Santos	2–3	São Paulo
Ketlen 16'; Cristiane 25'	Report	22' Aline Milene; 50' Glaucia; 90+8' Ana Alice
Penalties
Cristiane (penalty missed); Thaisinha (penalty missed); Bia Menezes (penalty scored); Tayla (penalty scored)	2–4	(penalty scored) Maressa; (penalty scored) Micaelly; (penalty scored) Vivian; (penalty scored) Pardal

Vila Belmiro, Santos
Attendance: 5,150
Referee: Matheus Delgado Candançan

== Final ==
=== Final ===
Team 1	Agg.	Team 2	1st leg	2nd leg
Corinthians	5-3	São Paulo	1-2	4-1

19 November 2023
16:00

São Paulo	2–1	Corinthians
Aline Milene 41'; Ariel 76' (pen.)	Report	31' Victória

Vila Belmiro, Santos
Attendance: 2,064
Referee: Marianna Nanni Batalha
26 November 2023
10:30

Corinthians	4–1	São Paulo
Jaqueline Ribeiro 39'; Tarciane 54'; Victória 64'; Jheniffer 75'	Report	62' Dudinha

Arena Corinthians, São Paulo
Attendance: 39,902
Referee: Edina Alves Batista

== Top goalscorers ==
As of 1 December 2023

Rank	Player	Club	Goals
1	(Brazil) Victória Albuquerque	Corinthians	10
2	(Brazil) Amanda Gutierres	Palmeiras	8
3	(Brazil) Eudimilla	Ferroviária	7
3	(Brazil) Grazi	Corinthians	7
5	(Brazil) Glaucia	São Paulo	6
5	(Brazil) Millene	Corinthians	6
5	(Brazil) Letícia	Palmeiras	6

Source: Federação Paulista de Futebol
