= 2026 Supercopa do Brasil de Futebol Feminino =

2026 Supercopa Feminina
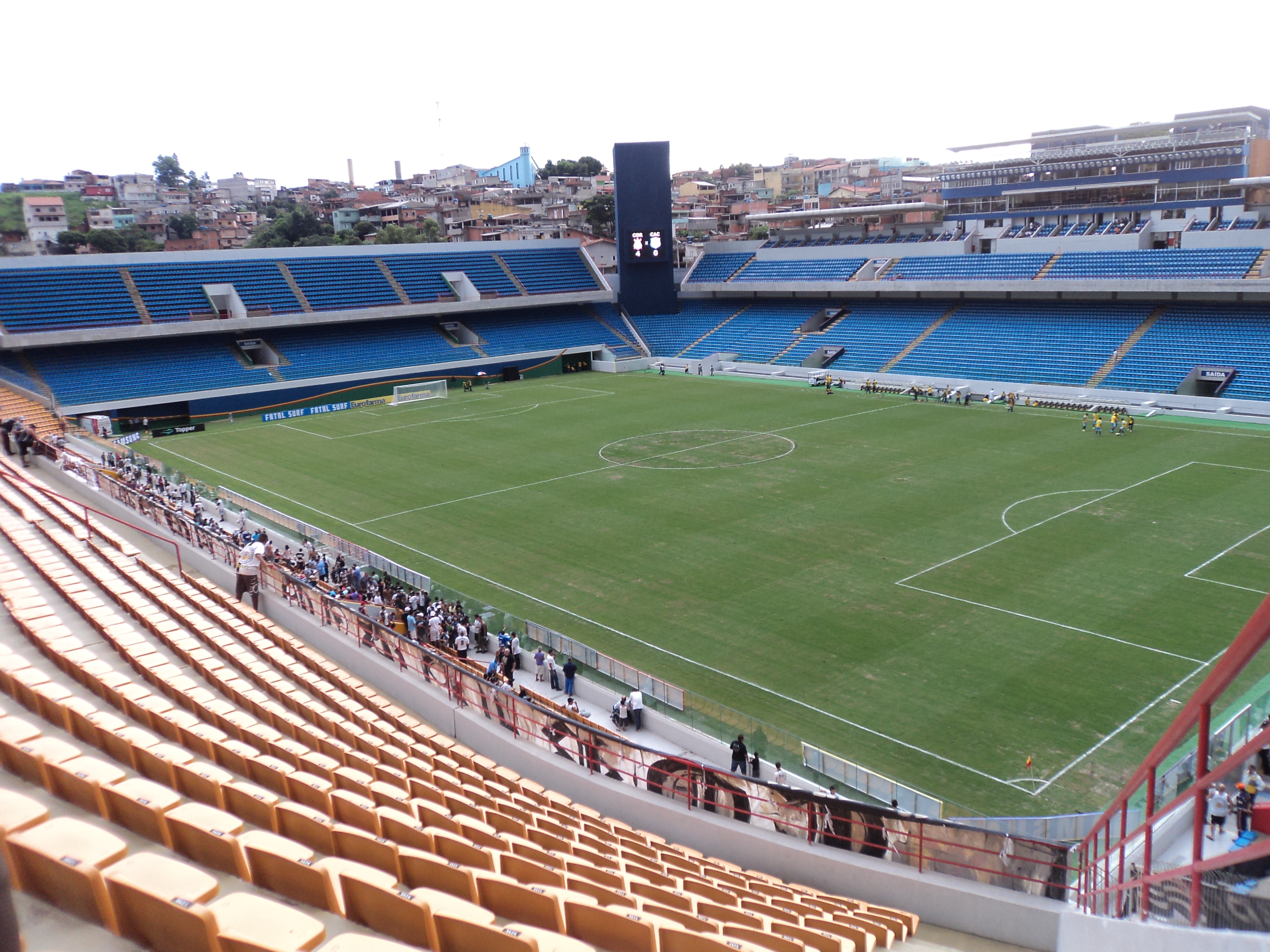
- Arena Crefisa Barueri, venue
Palmeiras	Corinthians
(São Paulo (state))	(São Paulo (state))
1	1
- Palmeiras won 5–4 on penalties
- Date: 7 February 2026
- Venue: Arena Crefisa Barueri, Barueri
- Referee: Edina Alves Batista
- Attendance: 2,576

The 2026 Supercopa Feminina was the fifth edition of the Supercopa do Brasil Feminina. Previously, the Supercopa do Brasil Feminina was a single-elimination tournament contested by eight teams selected from the Campeonato Brasileiro de Futebol Feminino Séries A1 and A2. However, with the return of the Copa do Brasil de Futebol Feminino, the format of the competition changed to a single match between the winners of the Campeonato Brasileiro Feminino A1 and the Copa do Brasil Feminina.

This season, it was contested between Corinthians (winners of 2025 Campeonato Brasileiro Feminino A1) and Palmeiras (winners of 2025 Copa do Brasil Feminina) on 7 February 2026 at Arena Crefisa Barueri in Barueri. The home team was chosen in a draw held at the CBF headquarters in Rio de Janeiro on 16 January 2026. Due to the replacement of the synthetic turf at their usual stadium, Allianz Parque, Palmeiras hosted the match at Arena Crefisa Barueri.

Palmeiras won the match on penalties after the game finished 1–1. This was their first Supercopa Feminina title.

== Qualified teams ==
- Note: **Bold** indicates winners

Team	Qualification	Previous appearances
(São Paulo (state)) Corinthians	2025 Campeonato Brasileiro Feminino A1 champions	4 (**2022**, **2023**, **2024**, 2025)
(São Paulo (state)) Palmeiras	2025 Copa do Brasil Feminina champions	1 (2022)

== Match ==
In the 16th minute of the first half, Corinthians' goalkeeper Lelê was hit on the head following a collision with Bia Zaneratto, after which she was replaced by Nicole. According to the concussion protocol, Corinthians were therefore allowed to make six substitutions.

=== Details ===
7 February 2026
16:00

Palmeiras (São Paulo (state))	1–1	(São Paulo (state)) Corinthians
Bia Zaneratto 39'	Report	Jaqueline 5'
Penalties
Bia Zaneratto (penalty scored); Poliana (penalty scored); Duda Santos (penalty scored); Gláucia (penalty missed); Brena (penalty missed); Pati Maldaner (penalty scored); Tainá Maranhão (penalty scored)	5–4	(penalty missed) Gabi Zanotti; (penalty scored) Victória; (penalty scored) Thaís Ferreira; (penalty scored) Letícia Monteiro; (penalty missed) Jhonson; (penalty scored) Robledo; (penalty missed) Tamires

Arena Crefisa Barueri, Barueri
Attendance: 2,576
Referee: Edina Alves Batista (São Paulo)

**Palmeiras**	**Corinthians**

GK	25	(Colombia) Katherine Tapia
DF	20	(Brazil) Andressinha		(substituted off) 65'
DF	13	(Brazil) Pati Maldaner
DF	3	(Brazil) Poliana
DF	6	(Brazil) Fe Palermo		(substituted off) 65'
MF	5	(Brazil) Ingryd	(yellow card) 12'	(substituted off) 46'
MF	7	(Brazil) Brena
MF	77	(Brazil) Rhayanna		(substituted off) 86'
FW	11	(Brazil) Tainá Maranhão
FW	9	(Brazil) Gláucia
FW	10	(Brazil) Bia Zaneratto (c)
Substitutes:
GK	1	(Brazil) Tainá
DF	2	(Colombia) Ana María Guzmán		(substituted on) 86'
DF	4	(Brazil) Giovanna Campiolo
DF	16	(Brazil) Emily Assis
DF	21	(Brazil) Carlinha
MF	8	(Brazil) Diany		(substituted on) 65'
MF	17	(Brazil) Isadora Amaral
MF	27	(Brazil) Duda Santos		(substituted on) 46'
MF	33	(Argentina) Lorena Benítez
MF	34	(Brazil) Raíssa Bahia		(substituted on) 65'
MF	99	(Ecuador) Joselyn Espinales
FW	24	(Colombia) Greicy Landázury
Manager:
(Brazil) Rosana

GK	12	(Brazil) Lelê		(substituted off) 20'
DF	23	(Brazil) Gi Fernandes		(substituted off) 58'
DF	5	(Brazil) Thaís Ferreira
DF	3	(Brazil) Leticia Teles
DF	37	(Brazil) Tamires
MF	88	(Brazil) Ana Vitória		(substituted off) 65'
MF	27	(Brazil) Duda Sampaio
MF	8	(Brazil) Andressa Alves		(substituted off) 78'
FW	30	(Brazil) Jaqueline		(substituted off) 78'
FW	25	(Uruguay) Belén Aquino		(substituted off) 58'
FW	10	(Brazil) Gabi Zanotti (c)
Substitutes:
GK	1	(Brazil) Nicole		(substituted on) 20'
DF	22	(Brazil) Juliete
DF	99	(Brazil) Érika		(substituted on) 58'
MF	7	(Colombia) Gisela Robledo	(yellow card) 68'	(substituted on) 58'
MF	17	(Brazil) Victória		(substituted on) 78'
MF	19	(Brazil) Letícia Monteiro		(substituted on) 65'
MF	20	(Colombia) Paola García
MF	31	(Venezuela) Dayana Rodríguez
FW	13	(Brazil) Ivana Fuso
FW	29	(Brazil) Rhaizza
FW	40	(Brazil) Jhonson		(substituted on) 78'
FW	77	(Brazil) Carol Nogueira
Manager:
(Brazil) Lucas Piccinato

Assistant referees:
Neuza Inês Back (São Paulo)
Fabrini Bevilaqua Costa (São Paulo)
Fourth official:
Daiane Caroline Muniz dos Santos (São Paulo)
Fifth official:
Maíra Mastella Moreira (Rio Grande do Sul)
Video assistant referee:
Charly Wendy Straub Deretti (Santa Catarina)
Assistant video assistant referee:
Helen Aparecida Gonçalves Silva Araújo (Minas Gerais)

**Match rules**

- 90 minutes.
- Penalty shoot-out if scores still level.
- Twelve named substitutes.
- Maximum of five substitutions.
