= 2020 Tournoi de France squads =

Inaugural edition of the Tournoi de France

The 2020 Tournoi de France was the inaugural edition of the Tournoi de France, an international women's football tournament, consisting of a series of friendly games, that was held in France from 4 to 10 March 2020. The four national teams involved in the tournament registered a squad of 23 players.

The age listed for each player is on 4 March 2020, the first day of the tournament. The numbers of caps and goals listed for each player do not include any matches played after the start of tournament. The club listed is the club for which the player last played a competitive match prior to the tournament. The nationality for each club reflects the national association (not the league) to which the club is affiliated. A flag is included for coaches that are of a different nationality than their own national team.

== Squads ==
=== Brazil ===
Coach: (Sweden) Pia Sundhage

The final squad was announced on 18 February 2020. Due to injuries Érika and Geyse were replaced by Antônia and Thaís Guedes on 1 March 2020.

No.	Pos.	Player	Date of birth (age)	Club
1	GK	Bárbara	4 July 1988 (aged 31)	(Brazilian Football Confederation) Kindermann
2	DF	Letícia Santos	2 December 1994 (aged 25)	(German Football Association) 1. FFC Frankfurt
3	DF	Antônia	26 April 1994 (aged 25)	(Royal Spanish Football Federation) Madrid CFF
4	DF	Bruna Benites	16 October 1985 (aged 34)	(Brazilian Football Confederation) Internacional
5	MF	Thaisa	17 December 1988 (aged 31)	(Royal Spanish Football Federation) Tacón
6	DF	Tamires	10 October 1987 (aged 32)	(Brazilian Football Confederation) Corinthians
7	MF	Andressa Alves	10 November 1992 (aged 27)	(Italian Football Federation) Roma
8	MF	Formiga	3 March 1978 (aged 42)	(French Football Federation) Paris Saint-Germain
9	MF	Debinha	20 October 1991 (aged 28)	(United States Soccer Federation) North Carolina Courage
10	FW	Marta (captain)	19 February 1986 (aged 34)	(United States Soccer Federation) Orlando Pride
11	FW	Cristiane	15 May 1985 (aged 34)	(Brazilian Football Confederation) Santos
12	GK	Aline Reis	15 April 1989 (aged 30)	(Royal Spanish Football Federation) Granadilla
13	MF	Aline Milene	8 April 1994 (aged 25)	(Brazilian Football Confederation) Ferroviária
14	DF	Daiane	7 September 1997 (aged 22)	(Royal Spanish Football Federation) Tacón
15	DF	Tayla	9 May 1992 (aged 27)	(Brazilian Football Confederation) Santos
16	FW	Bia Zaneratto	17 December 1993 (aged 26)	(Brazilian Football Confederation) Palmeiras
17	MF	Andressinha	1 May 1995 (aged 24)	(Brazilian Football Confederation) Corinthians
18	MF	Duda	18 July 1995 (aged 24)	(Brazilian Football Confederation) São Paulo
19	FW	Ludmila	11 December 1994 (aged 25)	(Royal Spanish Football Federation) Atlético Madrid
20	DF	Jucinara	3 June 1993 (aged 26)	(Royal Spanish Football Federation) Levante
21	FW	Thaís Guedes	20 January 1993 (aged 27)	(Brazilian Football Confederation) Santos
22	DF	Rafaelle	18 June 1991 (aged 28)	(Chinese Football Association) Changchun Zhuoyue
23	MF	Luana	2 May 1993 (aged 26)	(French Football Federation) Paris Saint-Germain
24	GK	Natascha	27 September 1997 (aged 22)	(French Football Federation) Paris FC

=== Canada ===
Coach: (Denmark) Kenneth Heiner-Møller

The final squad was announced on 25 February 2020.

No.	Pos.	Player	Date of birth (age)	Caps	Goals	Club
1	GK	Stephanie Labbé	October 10, 1986 (aged 33)	71	0	(United States Soccer Federation) North Carolina Courage
2	DF	Allysha Chapman	January 25, 1989 (aged 31)	72	1	(United States Soccer Federation) Houston Dash
3	DF	Kadeisha Buchanan	November 5, 1995 (aged 24)	100	4	(French Football Federation) Lyon
4	DF	Shelina Zadorsky	October 24, 1992 (aged 27)	64	2	(United States Soccer Federation) Orlando Pride
5	DF	Quinn (Note: Then known as Rebecca Quinn)	August 11, 1995 (aged 24)	57	5	(United States Soccer Federation) Reign FC
6	FW	Deanne Rose	March 3, 1999 (aged 21)	46	9	(United States Soccer Federation) Florida Gators
7	MF	Julia Grosso	August 29, 2000 (aged 19)	18	0	(United States Soccer Federation) Texas Longhorns
8	MF	Diana Matheson	April 6, 1984 (aged 35)	203	18	(United States Soccer Federation) Utah Royals
9	FW	Jordyn Huitema	May 8, 2001 (aged 18)	30	13	(French Football Federation) Paris Saint-Germain
10	DF	Ashley Lawrence	June 11, 1995 (aged 24)	88	7	(French Football Federation) Paris Saint-Germain
11	MF	Desiree Scott	July 31, 1987 (aged 32)	153	0	(United States Soccer Federation) Utah Royals
12	FW	Christine Sinclair (captain)	June 12, 1983 (aged 36)	293	186	(United States Soccer Federation) Portland Thorns
13	MF	Sophie Schmidt	June 28, 1988 (aged 31)	196	19	(United States Soccer Federation) Houston Dash
14	MF	Gabrielle Carle	October 12, 1998 (aged 21)	18	1	(United States Soccer Federation) Florida State Seminoles
15	FW	Nichelle Prince	February 19, 1995 (aged 25)	56	11	(United States Soccer Federation) Houston Dash
16	FW	Janine Beckie	August 20, 1994 (aged 25)	67	30	(The Football Association) Manchester City
17	MF	Jessie Fleming	March 11, 1998 (aged 21)	74	10	(United States Soccer Federation) UCLA Bruins
18	GK	Kailen Sheridan	July 16, 1995 (aged 24)	8	0	(United States Soccer Federation) Sky Blue
19	FW	Adriana Leon	October 2, 1992 (aged 27)	65	19	(The Football Association) West Ham United
20	GK	Sabrina D'Angelo	May 11, 1993 (aged 26)	7	0	(Swedish Football Association) Vittsjö
23	DF	Jayde Riviere	January 22, 2001 (aged 19)	13	1	(United States Soccer Federation) Michigan Wolverines
24	DF	Vanessa Gilles	March 11, 1996 (aged 23)	1	0	(French Football Federation) Bordeaux

=== France ===
Coach: Corinne Diacre

The final squad was announced on 26 February 2020.

No.	Pos.	Player	Date of birth (age)	Caps	Goals	Club
1	GK	Solène Durand	20 November 1994 (aged 25)	0	0	(French Football Federation) Guingamp
2	DF	Ève Périsset	24 December 1994 (aged 25)	17	0	(French Football Federation) Paris Saint-Germain
3	DF	Wendie Renard	20 July 1990 (aged 29)	117	24	(French Football Federation) Lyon
4	DF	Marion Torrent	17 April 1992 (aged 27)	28	0	(French Football Federation) Montpellier
5	DF	Aïssatou Tounkara	16 March 1995 (aged 24)	13	0	(Royal Spanish Football Federation) Atlético Madrid
6	MF	Amandine Henry (captain)	28 September 1989 (aged 30)	89	13	(French Football Federation) Lyon
7	DF	Sakina Karchaoui	26 January 1996 (aged 24)	28	0	(French Football Federation) Montpellier
8	MF	Grace Geyoro	2 July 1997 (aged 22)	26	1	(French Football Federation) Paris Saint-Germain
9	FW	Eugénie Le Sommer (vice-captain)	18 May 1989 (aged 30)	167	80	(French Football Federation) Lyon
10	MF	Amel Majri	25 January 1993 (aged 27)	54	5	(French Football Federation) Lyon
11	FW	Kadidiatou Diani	1 April 1995 (aged 24)	53	10	(French Football Federation) Paris Saint-Germain
12	FW	Marie-Antoinette Katoto	1 November 1998 (aged 21)	6	2	(French Football Federation) Paris Saint-Germain
13	FW	Valérie Gauvin	1 June 1996 (aged 23)	26	13	(French Football Federation) Montpellier
14	MF	Charlotte Bilbault	5 June 1990 (aged 29)	20	1	(French Football Federation) Paris FC
15	MF	Kenza Dali	31 July 1991 (aged 28)	22	4	(The Football Association) West Ham United
16	GK	Sarah Bouhaddi	17 October 1986 (aged 33)	147	0	(French Football Federation) Lyon
17	FW	Ouleymata Sarr	8 October 1995 (aged 24)	10	2	(French Football Federation) Lille
18	MF	Viviane Asseyi	20 November 1993 (aged 26)	37	4	(French Football Federation) Bordeaux
19	DF	Griedge Mbock Bathy	26 February 1995 (aged 25)	57	5	(French Football Federation) Lyon
20	FW	Delphine Cascarino	5 February 1997 (aged 23)	20	3	(French Football Federation) Lyon
21	GK	Pauline Peyraud-Magnin	17 March 1992 (aged 27)	2	0	(The Football Association) Arsenal
22	DF	Estelle Cascarino	5 February 1997 (aged 23)	1	0	(French Football Federation) Paris FC
23	DF	Perle Morroni	15 October 1997 (aged 22)	0	0	(French Football Federation) Paris Saint-Germain

=== Netherlands ===
Coach: Sarina Wiegman

The final squad was announced on 24 February 2020.

No.	Pos.	Player	Date of birth (age)	Caps	Goals	Club
1	GK	Sari van Veenendaal (captain)	3 April 1990 (aged 29)	66	0	(Royal Spanish Football Federation) Atlético Madrid
2	DF	Aniek Nouwen	9 March 1999 (aged 20)	5	0	(Royal Dutch Football Association) PSV
3	DF	Stefanie van der Gragt	16 August 1992 (aged 27)	63	9	(Royal Spanish Football Federation) Barcelona
4	DF	Merel van Dongen	11 February 1993 (aged 27)	39	1	(Royal Spanish Football Federation) Real Betis
5	DF	Kika van Es	11 October 1991 (aged 28)	62	0	(The Football Association) Everton
6	DF	Anouk Dekker	15 November 1986 (aged 33)	85	7	(French Football Federation) Montpellier
7	FW	Shanice van de Sanden	2 October 1992 (aged 27)	75	18	(French Football Federation) Lyon
8	MF	Sherida Spitse	29 May 1990 (aged 29)	175	39	(Norwegian Football Federation) Vålerenga
9	FW	Vivianne Miedema	15 July 1996 (aged 23)	87	69	(The Football Association) Arsenal
10	MF	Daniëlle van de Donk	5 August 1991 (aged 28)	102	21	(The Football Association) Arsenal
11	FW	Lieke Martens	16 December 1992 (aged 27)	110	44	(Royal Spanish Football Federation) Barcelona
12	MF	Victoria Pelova	3 June 1999 (aged 20)	7	0	(Royal Dutch Football Association) Ajax
13	FW	Renate Jansen	7 December 1990 (aged 29)	40	3	(Royal Dutch Football Association) Twente
14	MF	Jackie Groenen	17 December 1994 (aged 25)	58	3	(The Football Association) Manchester United
15	DF	Lynn Wilms	3 October 2000 (aged 19)	1	0	(Royal Dutch Football Association) Twente
16	GK	Lize Kop	17 March 1998 (aged 21)	1	0	(Royal Dutch Football Association) Ajax
17	FW	Ashleigh Weerden	7 June 1999 (aged 20)	2	0	(Royal Dutch Football Association) Twente
18	DF	Danique Kerkdijk	1 May 1996 (aged 23)	14	0	(The Football Association) Brighton & Hove Albion
19	MF	Jill Roord	22 April 1997 (aged 22)	54	5	(The Football Association) Arsenal
20	DF	Dominique Bloodworth	17 January 1995 (aged 25)	60	2	(German Football Association) VfL Wolfsburg
21	FW	Lineth Beerensteyn	11 October 1996 (aged 23)	52	11	(German Football Association) Bayern Munich
22	MF	Inessa Kaagman	17 April 1996 (aged 23)	2	0	(The Football Association) Everton
23	GK	Loes Geurts	12 January 1986 (aged 34)	123	0	(Swedish Football Association) Kopparbergs/Göteborg
24	FW	Joëlle Smits	7 February 2000 (aged 20)	0	0	(Royal Dutch Football Association) PSV

== Player representation ==
=== By club ===
Clubs with three or more players represented are listed.

Players	Club
9	(France) Lyon, (France) Paris Saint-Germain
4	(England) Arsenal, (France) Montpellier
3	(Brazil) Santos, (France) Paris FC, (Netherlands) Twente, (Spain) Atlético Madrid, (United States) Houston Dash

=== By club nationality ===
Players	Clubs
29	France
17	United States
11	England, Spain
10	Brazil
7	Netherlands
3	Germany
2	Sweden
1	China, Italy, Norway

=== By club federation ===
Players	Federation
65	UEFA
17	CONCACAF
10	CONMEBOL
1	AFC

=== By representatives of domestic league ===
National squad	Players
France	20
Brazil	10
Netherlands	7
Canada	0
