= Raíssa Bahia =

Brazilian professional footballer (born 2003)

Personal information
- Full name: Raíssa Soares Carvalho da Paz
- Date of birth: 27 August 2003 (age 23)
- Place of birth: Jacobina, Brazil
- Positions: Left-back; midfielder

Team information
- Current team: Palmeiras
- Number: 34

Youth career
- 2021–2023: Grêmio

Senior career*
Years	Team	Apps	(Gls)
2021	Fluminense de Feira	2	(0)
2022–2025	Grêmio	55	(2)
2025–	Palmeiras	18	(2)

International career^{‡}
2026–	Brazil	2	(1)
- * Club domestic league appearances and goals as of 21:25, 12 April 2026 (UTC) ‡ National team caps and goals as of 23:10, 15 April 2026 (UTC)

Raíssa Soares Carvalho da Paz (born 27 August 2003), known as Raíssa Bahia or just Raíssa, is a Brazilian professional footballer who plays as either a left-back or a midfielder for Palmeiras and the Brazil national team.

== Club career ==
Born in Jacobina, Bahia, Raíssa played with boys in her hometown before playing the Campeonato Baiano de Futebol Feminino with Fluminense de Feira in 2021. Shortly after, she moved to Grêmio and initially played for their under-18 squad.

After making her senior debut with Grêmio in 2022, Raíssa helped the club to win two Campeonato Gaúcho de Futebol Feminino titles, but only established herself as a regular starter from the 2024 season onwards. On 20 July 2025, she joined Palmeiras, with her previous club retaining a percentage over a future sale.

== International career ==
On 11 June 2021, Raíssa was called up to the Brazil national under-20 team for a period of trainings. On 25 March 2026, she was called up to the full side by head coach Arthur Elias for the 2026 FIFA Series.

Raíssa made her full international debut on 11 April 2026, coming on as a half-time substitute for Yasmim and providing the assist to Taina Maranhão's fifth goal in a 5–1 routing of South Korea at the Arena Pantanal.

=== International goals ===
No.	Date	Venue	Opponent	Score	Result	Competition
1.	14 April 2026	Arena Pantanal, Cuiabá, Brazil	Zambia	4–1	6–1	2026 FIFA Series

== Honours ==
Grêmio

- Campeonato Gaúcho de Futebol Feminino: 2022, 2024

Palmeiras

- Campeonato Paulista de Futebol Feminino: 2025
- Copa do Brasil de Futebol Feminino: 2025
- Supercopa do Brasil de Futebol Feminino: 2026
