= Kelly (footballer, born 1987) =

Brazilian footballer

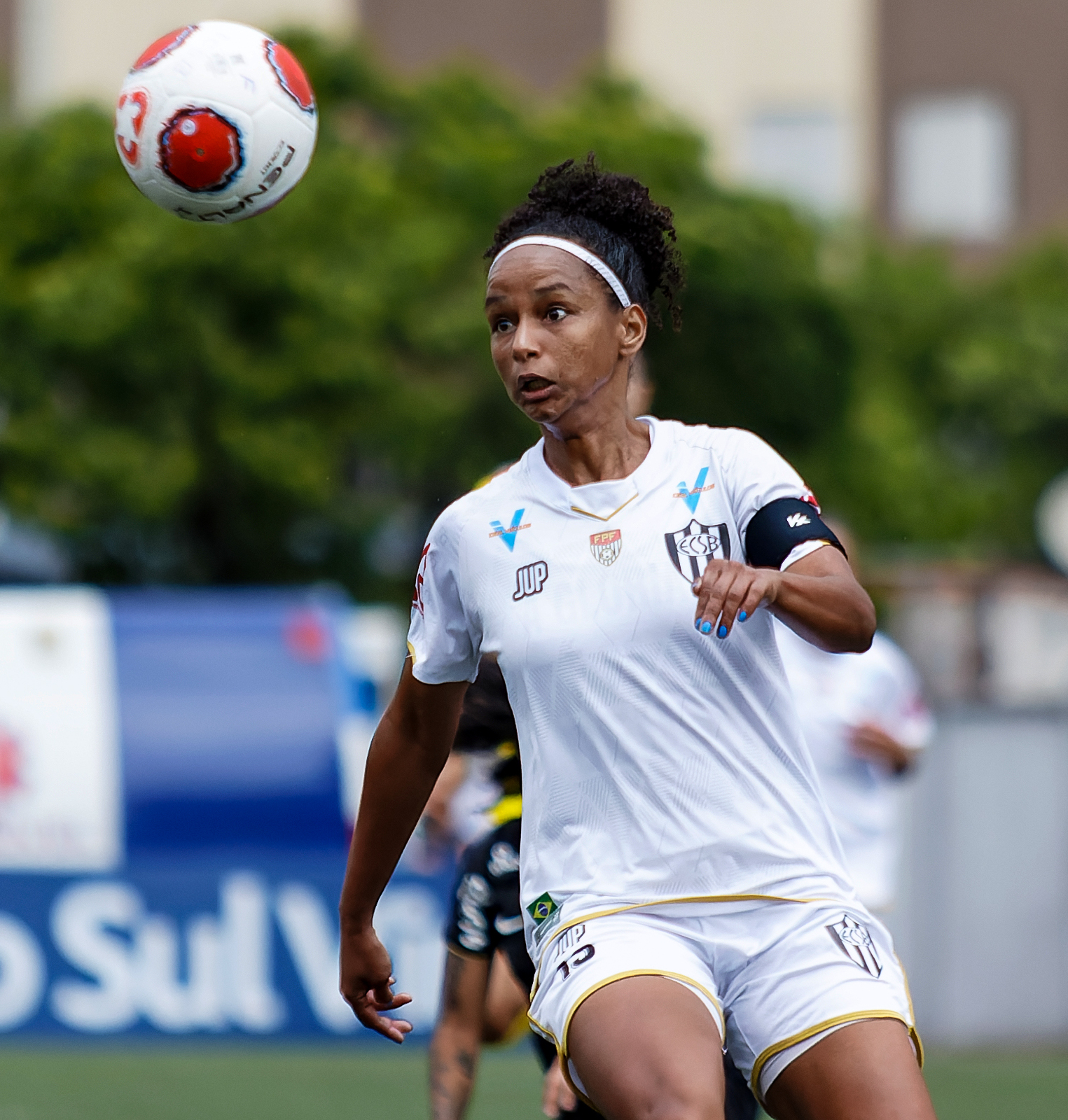
- Kelly with EC São Bernardo in 2022

Personal information
- Full name: Kelly Rodrigues Santana Costa
- Date of birth: 22 June 1987 (age 39)
- Place of birth: São Paulo, Brazil
- Height: 1.66 m (5 ft 5 in)
- Positions: Centre back; midfielder

Team information
- Current team: Santos U15 (assistant)

Senior career*
Years	Team	Apps	(Gls)
2005	Juventus-SP		
2006–2011	Santos		
2012–2014	Centro Olímpico	15	(0)
2015	Ferroviária	0	(0)
2015–2019	Santos	8	(0)
2020	Flamengo	5	(0)
2021	Hapoel Be'er Sheva	10	(0)
2022	EC São Bernardo	0	(0)
2023–2024	Santos	1	(0)

Managerial career
- 2024–: Santos U15 (assistant)
- * Club domestic league appearances and goals

Kelly Rodrigues Santana Costa (born 22 June 1987), simply known as Kelly, is a Brazilian football coach and former player who played as a central defender or a midfielder. She is the current assistant of Santos' under-15 team.

== Club career ==
Born in São Paulo, Kelly began her career with hometown side Juventus-SP, before joining Santos in 2006. In January 2012, after the club's women's football section was closed, she moved to Centro Olímpico.

Kelly returned to Peixe in April 2015, after a short period at Ferroviária. She left in 2019, and was announced at Flamengo in January 2020.

In 2021, Kelly moved abroad and joined the Israeli side Hapoel Be'er Sheva. She returned to her home country with EC São Bernardo in the following year, before rejoining Santos on 27 January 2023.

On 20 September 2024, Kelly announced her retirement and became an assistant of the under-15 team of her last club Santos.

== Honours ==
Santos

- Campeonato Paulista de Futebol Feminino: 2007, 2010, 2011, 2018
- Copa do Brasil de Futebol Feminino: 2008, 2009
- Copa Libertadores Femenina: 2009, 2010
- Campeonato Brasileiro de Futebol Feminino Série A1: 2017
- Copa Paulista de Futebol Feminino: 2024
