= Ketlen =

Brazilian footballer

Personal information
- Full name: Ketlen Wiggers
- Date of birth: 7 January 1992 (age 34)
- Place of birth: Rio Fortuna, Brazil
- Height: 1.70 m (5 ft 7 in)
- Position: Forward

Team information
- Current team: Santos
- Number: 7

Senior career*
Years	Team	Apps	(Gls)
2007–2010	Santos		
2011	Bangu	?	(8)
2011–2012	Vitória das Tabocas		
2013	Vittsjö	4	(0)
2013–2014	Centro Olímpico	30	(16)
2015	Boston Breakers	1	(0)
2015–	Santos	241	(115)

International career^{‡}
2008	Brazil U17	3	(1)
2008–2012	Brazil U20	7	(1)
2011	Brazil (University)		(5)
2011	Brazil	3	(0)
Medal record
Women's football
Representing Brazil
Pan American Games
Silver medal – second place	2011 Guadalajara	Team
Universiade
Bronze medal – third place	2011 Shenzhen	Team competition
- * Club domestic league appearances and goals as of 21:09, 19 December 2024 (UTC) ‡ National team caps and goals as of 21:23, 17 April 2021 (UTC)

Ketlen Wiggers (born 7 January 1992), simply known as Ketlen, is a Brazilian footballer who plays as a forward for Santos.

Ketlen has been associated with Santos for most of her career, being the top goalscorer in the women's team's history, and also the top goalscorer of the entire club in the post-Pelé era.

== Club career ==
Born in Rio Fortuna, Santa Catarina, Ketlen started her career in a football school in her hometown. In 2007, aged 15, she joined Santos after a trial period. With some of Santos's leading players away training with the national team, Ketlen received an early chance in the first team. She scored her first goal for the club on 27 May 2007, in a 3–0 win over São José.

A part of the squad which had Marta and Cristiane as their key units, Ketlen won two Campeonato Paulista de Futebol Feminino, two Copa do Brasil de Futebol Feminino and two Copa Libertadores Femenina titles. She left the club in early 2011 to join Bangu, but ended the year at Vitória das Tabocas, where she also won Campeonato Pernambucano de Futebol Feminino titles during her spell.

On 9 May 2013, Ketlen moved abroad for the first time in her career, joining Swedish Damallsvenskan side Vittsjö. However, she only played five times for the club during the season.

Shortly after leaving Vittsjö, Ketlen returned to her home country with Centro Olímpico. On 4 December 2014, she was transferred to National Women's Soccer League side Boston Breakers.

After Ketlen played 61 minutes of one match, the Breakers agreed to release her from her contract due to homesickness on 7 May 2015. She subsequently returned to her first club Santos, after the women's team was reestablished.

On 14 September 2020, Ketlen scored her 100th goal for the Sereias da Vila in a 2–0 win over Minas ICESP, becoming the first woman to do so at the club. In March 2022, however, after some new research, 42 goals were added to her account, giving her 162 goals for Santos at the time. On 23 November 2022, she renewed her contract with Santos for one year.

On 14 January 2024, Santos announced the renewal of Ketlen's contract for another two seasons.

In 2025, Ketlen made a pause in her career because she was pregnant and later gave birth to her first son Lucca. However, she did not stop training with Santos through most of her pregnancy, only stopping after the eighth month.

== International career ==
Ketlen represented Brazil at under-17 and under-20 levels. She played in the 2008 South American U-17 Women's Championship, and in the 2010 and 2012 editions of the FIFA U-20 Women's World Cup aside from winning the 2010 and 2012 editions of the South American U-20 Women's Championship.

On 16 September 2011, after impressing in the 2011 Summer Universiade, Ketlen was called up to the senior team for the Pan American Games. She made her full international debut on 18 October, coming on as a second-half substitute for Daniele in a 2–0 win over Argentina at Estadio Omnilife in Guadalajara, Mexico. She featured in two more matches during the competition, as Brazil won the silver medal.

== Personal life ==
Since playing for Vitória das Tabocas, Ketlen has sometimes worn the nickname "Barbie" on her shirt. This is due to Pernambuco residents thinking her light skin, blue eyes and fair hair bore a resemblance to the fashion doll manufactured by Mattel.

== Career statistics ==
=== Club ===
As of 24 December 2025

Appearances and goals by club, season and competition
Club	Season	League			State league		Cup		Continental		Other		Total	
Club	Season	Division	Apps	Goals	Apps	Goals	Apps	Goals	Apps	Goals	Apps	Goals	Apps	Goals
Vittsjö	2013	Damallsvenskan	4	0	—		—		—		—		4	0
Centro Olímpico	2013	Série A1	12	8	—		—		—		—		12	8
Centro Olímpico	2014	Série A1	6	2	12	6	—		—		—		18	8
Centro Olímpico	Total		18	10	12	6	—		—		—		30	16
Boston Breakers	2015	NWSL	1	0	—		—		—		—		1	0
Santos	2015	Série A1	9	7	9	3	—		—		—		18	10
Santos	2016	Série A1	2	2	16	9	2	4	—		—		20	15
Santos	2017	Série A1	20	8	9	3	—		—		—		29	11
Santos	2018	Série A1	12	5	13	11	—		4 (Note: Appearance(s) in Copa Libertadores Femenina)	0	—		29	16
Santos	2019	Série A1	9	5	14	6	—		—		—		23	11
Santos	2020	Série A1	16	7	6	4	—		—		4 (Note: Appearance(s) in Copa Paulista de Futebol Feminino)	1	26	12
Santos	2021	Série A1	16	6	10	4	—		—		—		26	10
Santos	2022	Série A1	12	4	15	8	—		—		—		27	12
Santos	2023	Série A1	18	8	13	6	—		—		—		31	14
Santos	2024	Série A1	13	2	9	7	—		4	4	3	1	29	14
Santos	2025	Série A2	0	0	0	0	0	0	—		0	0	0	0
Santos	Total		127	54	114	61	2	4	8	4	7	2	258	125
Career total			150	64	126	67	2	4	8	4	7	2	293	141

=== International ===
As of 17 April 2021

National team	Year	Apps	Goals
Brazil	2011	3	0
Total		3	0

== Honours ==
Santos

- Campeonato Paulista de Futebol Feminino: 2007, 2010, 2018
- Copa Libertadores Femenina: 2009, 2010
- Copa do Brasil de Futebol Feminino: 2008, 2009
- Campeonato Brasileiro de Futebol Feminino Série A1: 2017
- Campeonato Paulista de Futebol Feminino: 2018
- Copa Paulista de Futebol Feminino: 2020, 2024

Vitória das Tabocas

- Campeonato Pernambucano de Futebol Feminino: 2012

Centro Olímpico

- Campeonato Brasileiro de Futebol Feminino Série A1: 2013

Brazil U20

- South American U-20 Women's Championship: 2010, 2012

Brazil

- Pan American Games Silver Medal: 2011
