= Giovana (footballer, born 1987) =

Brazilian footballer

Personal information
- Full name: Giovana Perpétuo dos Santos Floriano
- Date of birth: 30 January 1987 (age 39)
- Place of birth: Catanduva, Brazil
- Height: 1.75 m (5 ft 9 in)
- Positions: Right back; midfielder

Senior career*
Years	Team	Apps	(Gls)
2006–2007	Catanduva FC		
2008	América-SP		
2009	Francana		
2010–2011	Rio Preto		
2011–2013	SV Neulengbach	33	(13)
2013–2014	Rio Preto	10	(0)
2015	São Paulo		
2015–2018	Santos	18	(2)
2019–2022	São Paulo	48	(4)
2023	Santos	8	(1)
- * Club domestic league appearances and goals as of 13:58, 13 November 2023 (UTC)

Giovana Perpétuo dos Santos Floriano (born 30 January 1987), simply known as Giovana, is a Brazilian footballer who plays as a right back or a midfielder.

== Club career ==
Born in Catanduva, São Paulo, Giovana started her career with hometown club Catanduva FC, spending two years before moving to São José do Rio Preto. She represented América-SP and Rio Preto in the city, aside from a period at Francana, before moving to Austria in 2011, with SV Neulengbach.

Giovana left the Austrian side in May 2013, and returned to Rio Preto in her home country. In 2015, after a very short period at São Paulo, she joined Santos.

Ahead of the 2019 season, Giovana returned to São Paulo. She renewed her contract with the club for a further year on 29 December 2019, and signed a new two-year deal in January 2021.

On 14 March 2022, Giovana played her 100th match for Tricolor, a 3–1 win over Real Brasília. On 10 January of the following year, she was announced back at Santos.

== Honours ==
SV Neulengbach

- ÖFB-Frauenliga: 2011–12, 2012–13
- ÖFB Ladies Cup: 2011–12

Santos

- Campeonato Brasileiro de Futebol Feminino Série A1: 2017
- Campeonato Paulista de Futebol Feminino: 2018

São Paulo

- Campeonato Brasileiro de Futebol Feminino Série A2: 2019
