= Brena (footballer) =

Brazilian footballer (born 1996)

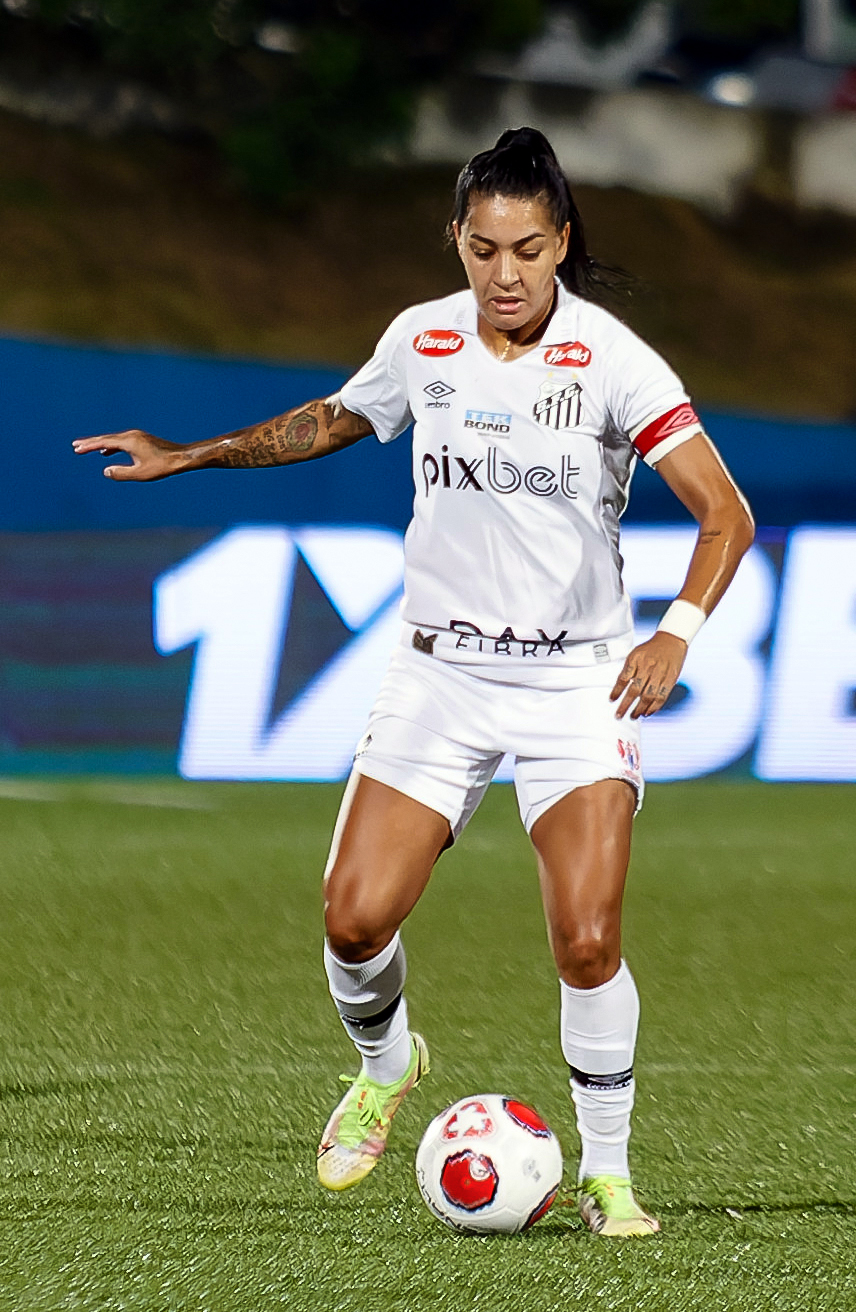

Personal information
- Full name: Brena Caroline Vianna de Oliveira
- Date of birth: 28 October 1996 (age 30)
- Place of birth: Rio de Janeiro, Brazil
- Height: 1.70 m (5 ft 7 in)
- Position: Midfielder

Team information
- Current team: Palmeiras
- Number: 7

Youth career
- 2010–2014: Vasco da Gama

Senior career*
Years	Team	Apps	(Gls)
2014	Vasco da Gama	2	(0)
2015	Flamengo	5	(0)
2016	Centro Olímpico	4	(1)
2017–2018	Santos	30	(6)
2019	Avaldsnes	9	(1)
2020–2023	Santos	51	(7)
2024–	Palmeiras	1	(0)

International career
2012	Brazil U17	?	(8)
2016	Brazil U20	4	(3)
- * Club domestic league appearances and goals as of 02:04, 21 March 2024 (UTC)

Brena Carolina Vianna de Oliveira (born 28 October 1996), simply known as Brena, is a Brazilian footballer who plays as a midfielder for Palmeiras and the Brazil women's national team.

== Club career ==
=== Vasco da Gama ===
Born in Rio de Janeiro, Brena finished her formation with Vasco da Gama, making her senior debut with the club against Kindermann on 18 September 2014.

=== Flamengo ===
She moved to Flamengo in the following year, making her debut against Centro Olímpico on 23 September 2015.

=== Centro Olímpico ===
Brena represented Centro Olímpico in the 2016 season, scoring in the 82nd minute on her debut, against América Mineiro on 21 January 2016.

=== Santos ===
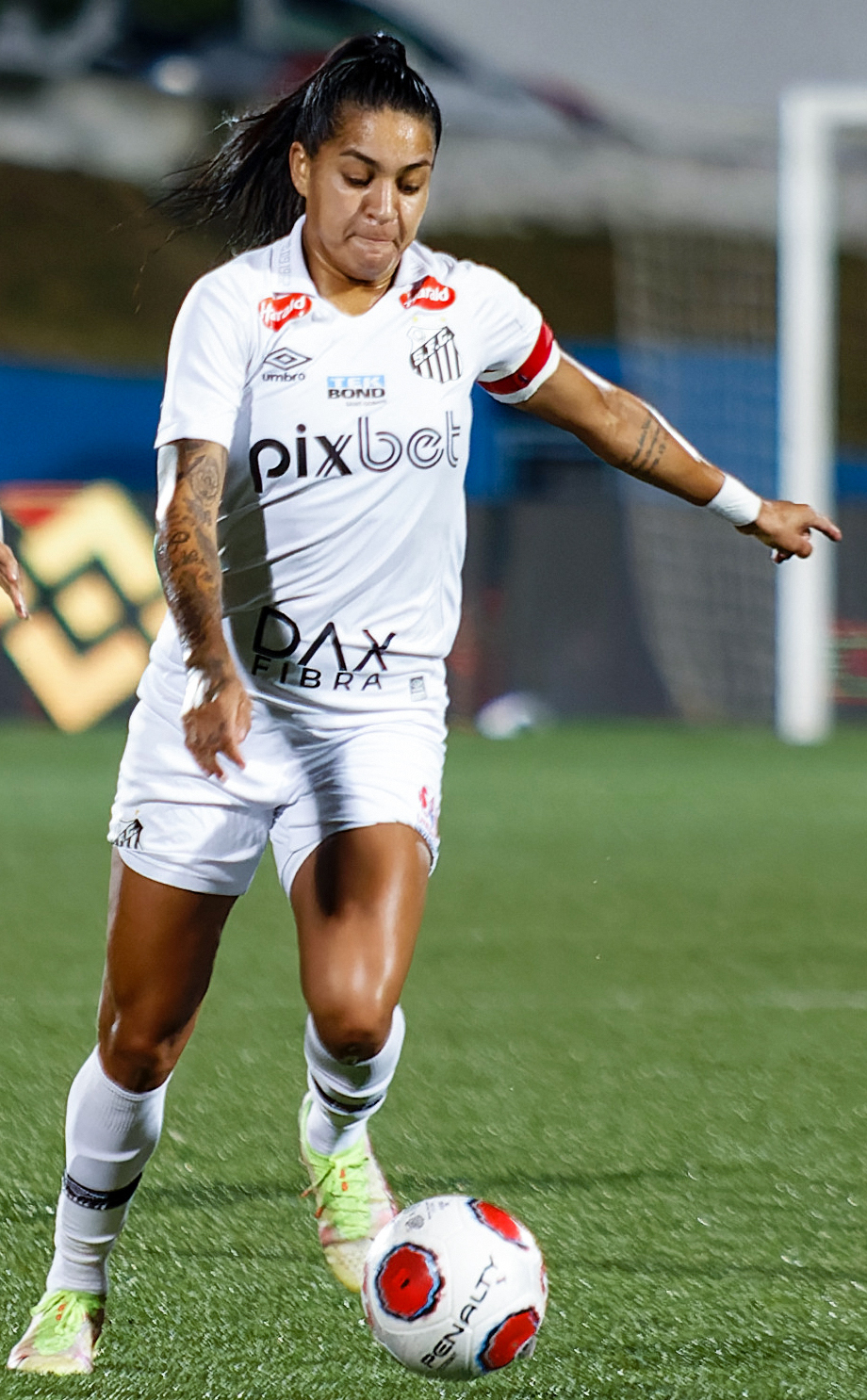
Brena with Santos in 2022

On 12 January 2017, Brena signed for Santos. She made her league debut against Foz Cataratas on 13 March 2017. Brena scored her first league goal for the club against São José on 25 April 2017, scoring in the 28th minute.

=== Avaldsnes ===
On 11 December of the following year, after being the top goalscorer of the 2018 Copa Libertadores Femenina, she moved abroad with Avaldsnes IL. Brena made her league debut for the club against Klepp on 23 March 2019. She scored her first goal against Stabaek on 11 May 2019, scoring in the 46th minute.

=== Return to Santos ===
Brena returned to Peixe in 2020. During her second spell at the club, she made her league debut against Flamengo on 8 February 2020. Brena scored her first goal for the club against Cruzeiro on 17 February 2020, scoring in the 65th minute. She was sidelined in April due to a knee injury. Upon returning, she was a regular starter and captain before leaving in December 2023.

=== Palmeiras ===
On 8 January 2024, Brena was announced at Palmeiras. She made her league debut for the club against Flamengo on 16 March 2024.

== International career ==
Brena scored twice on her debut for Brazil U20s against Papua New Guinea U20s on 13 November 2016, scoring in the 17th minute and scoring a penalty in the 23rd minute. After representing Brazil at the under-17 and under-20 levels in the 2012 South American U-17 Women's Championship, 2012 FIFA U-17 Women's World Cup and 2016 FIFA U-20 Women's World Cup, Brena was called up to the full side by manager Emily Lima on 24 March 2017, for a friendly against Bolivia.

== Personal life ==
Brena married American-Filipino footballer Reina Bonta in January 2025.

== Honours ==
Santos

- Campeonato Brasileiro de Futebol Feminino Série A1: 2017
- Campeonato Paulista de Futebol Feminino: 2018
- Copa Paulista de Futebol Feminino: 2020

Palmeiras

- Campeonato Paulista de Futebol Feminino: 2024,2025
- Copa do Brasil de Futebol Feminino: 2025
- Brasil Ladies Cup: 2025
- Supercopa do Brasil de Futebol Feminino: 2026

Individual

- Bola de Prata: 2023
- Campeonato Brasileiro Série A1 Team of the Year: 2025
