= Jourdan Ziff =

American soccer player (born 1997)

Personal information
- Full name: Jourdan Kenna Ziff
- Date of birth: December 17, 1997 (age 28)
- Place of birth: Temecula, California, United States
- Height: 5 ft 7 in (1.70 m)
- Position: Forward

Youth career
- TVSA Hawks

College career
Years	Team	Apps	(Gls)
2015–2018	Loyola Greyhounds	48	(36)

Senior career*
Years	Team	Apps	(Gls)
2019	NJS	16	(19)
2021–2022	Puerto Rico Sol	25	(21)
2023	Santos	8	(2)
2024	Whitecaps FC Elite	1	(0)
- * Club domestic league appearances and goals as of July 20, 2024

Jourdan Kenna Ziff (born December 17, 1997) is an American professional soccer player who plays as a forward.

== Early life ==
A native of Temecula, California, Ziff played youth soccer with the TVSA Hawks.

She has Brazilian roots from her maternal grandmother, who was born in Rio de Janeiro.

== College career ==
In 2015, Ziff began attending Loyola University Maryland, where she played for the women's soccer team. On September 26, 2015, she recorded her first collegiate point with an assist against the Navy Midshipmen, subsequently earning Patriot League Rookie of the Week honors. On November 3, she scored her first collegiate goal against the Colgate Raiders, for which she was again awarded Patriot League Rookie of the Week honors. She scored braces on September 28, 2016 against the American Eagles and on September 6, 2018 against the Towson Tigers. Ahead of her junior season in 2017, she was named a team co-captain. At the end of the 2018 season, she was named to the All-Patriot League Second Team. She was named to the Patriot League Academic Honor Roll three times from 2016 to 2018, including 4.0 GPAs during the fall of 2017 and 2018.

== Club career ==
In 2019, she played with Finnish side Nurmijärven Jalkapalloseura, playing in the third tier Naisten Kakkonen. She made her debut on May 28, 2019 against TPV 2, scoring her first goal.

In 2021, Ziff joined Puerto Rico Sol FC in the Liga Puerto Rico, and helped the side to win the 2021 Clausura tournament by scoring a brace.

In January 2023, she signed with Santos in the Campeonato Brasileiro. She was given the number 9 jersey. However, her debut was delayed due to visa issues, with the issue finally being resolved in late March. She made her debut for the club on April 1, starting in a 1–0 away loss against Grêmio. She scored her first goal on April 23, scoring the winner in a 1–0 away victory over São Paulo, becoming the first American to score a goal in the Brazilian Women's Championship. Mainly used as a backup to Cristiane, Ziff departed Santos in December 2023, after the club opted to not renew her contract.

In July 2024, she joined the Whitecaps FC Girls Elite in League1 British Columbia, making her debut on July 20 against Rivers FC.
