= Tamires =

Brazilian footballer (born 1987)

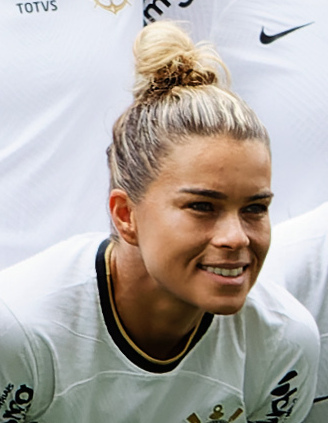
- Tamires with Corinthians in 2023

Personal information
- Full name: Tamires Cássia Dias de Britto
- Birth name: Tamires Cássia Dias Gomes
- Date of birth: 10 October 1987 (age 39)
- Place of birth: Caeté, Minas Gerais, Brazil
- Height: 1.61 m (5 ft 3 in)
- Positions: Midfielder; defender

Team information
- Current team: Corinthians
- Number: 37

Senior career*
Years	Team	Apps	(Gls)
2004–2005	CA Juventus		
2006–2007	Santos		
2008	Charlotte Lady Eagles	10	(1)
2008	Ferroviária		
2011	Atlético Mineiro		
2013–2015	Centro Olímpico	21	(11)
2015–2019	Fortuna Hjørring	39	(24)
2019–	Corinthians	159	(31)

International career^{‡}
2013–	Brazil	148	(7)
Medal record
Women's football
Representing Brazil
Olympic Games
Silver medal – second place	2024 Paris
Pan American Games
Gold medal – first place	2015 Toronto	Team
- * Club domestic league appearances and goals ‡ National team caps and goals as of 00:32, 8 April 2024 (UTC)

Tamires Cássia Dias de Britto (née Gomes, born 10 October 1987), commonly known as Tamires, is a Brazilian professional footballer who plays as a left-back for Corinthians and the Brazil national team. She participated in the 2015 and 2019 editions of the FIFA Women's World Cup, as well as at the 2016 Olympic Games.

== Club career ==
In 2008, Tamires made 10 appearances in the American W-League for Charlotte Lady Eagles, where she was nicknamed "Tam-tam". She joined Centro Olímpico in 2013, after playing for other Brazilian teams including Santos. In summer 2015 she agreed a move to Danish Danish A-Liga club Fortuna Hjørring.

In June 2019, she agreed a one-year contract with Corinthians, who gave her the number 37 shirt.

== International career ==
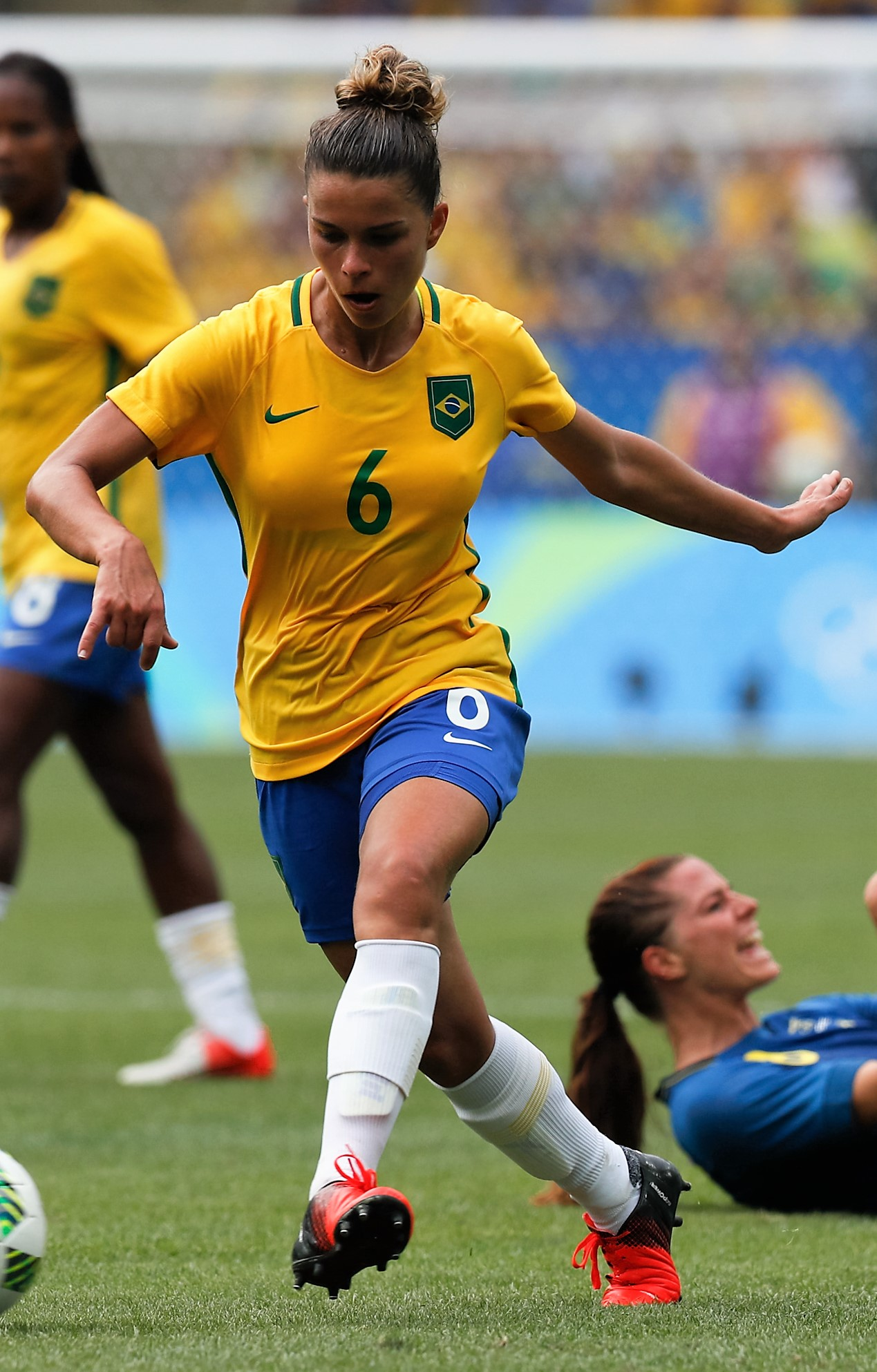
Tamires at the 2016 Olympics

Tamires played for the São Paulo select team, which represented Brazil at the 2006 Peace Queen Cup. She made her senior debut in September 2013, against New Zealand at the 2013 Valais Women's Cup. In Brazil's next match, she scored her first national team goal in a 4–0 win over Mexico.

At the 2014 Copa América Femenina, Tamires scored the fifth goal in Brazil's 6–0 rout of Argentina. In February 2015, she was included in an 18-month residency programme intended to prepare the national team for the 2015 FIFA Women's World Cup in Canada and the 2016 Rio Olympics. At the 2015 FIFA Women's World Cup, Brazil lost 1–0 in the second round to Australia. Tamires remained in Canada as part of the victorious Brazilian selection at the 2015 Pan American Games in Toronto.

In July 2015, Tamires was the victim of a robbery while leaving her mother's house in Santo André, and her Pan American Games gold medal was stolen. The Brazilian Football Confederation (CBF) presented her with a replica.

Tamires was named to the Brazil squad for the 2016 Summer Olympics, her first Olympic Games. She remained the national team's first-choice left-back at the 2019 FIFA Women's World Cup in France. She earned her 100th cap on 12 December 2019 against Mexico.

Tamires was called up to the Brazil squad for the 2022 Copa América Femenina, which Brazil finished as winners.

Tamires was called up to the Brazil squad for the 2023 FIFA Women's World Cup.

On 2 July 2024, Tamires was called up to the Brazil squad for the 2024 Summer Olympics. After helping Brazil beat hosts France in the quarterfinals, Tamires felt pain in her ankle and discovered a torn ligament, forcing her out of the following two games where the team ended with the silver medal.

== International goals ==
Goal	Date	Location	Opponent	#	Score	Result	Competition
1	2013-09-25	Savièse, Switzerland	Mexico	1.1	4–0	4–0	Valais Cup 2013
2	2014-04-09	Brisbane, Australia	Australia	1.1	1–1	2–1	Friendly game
3	2014-09-26	Sangolquí, Ecuador	Argentina	1.1	5–0	6–0	Copa América 2014
4	2016-12-7	Manaus, Brazil	Costa Rica	1.1	2–0	6–0	Torneio Internacional 2016
5	2019-10-8	Kielce, Poland	Poland	1.1	0–2	1–3	Friendly game
6	2022-09-2	Johannesburg, South Africa	South Africa	1.1	0–3	0–3	Friendly game
7	2022-04-11	Nuremberg, Germany	Germany	1.1	0–1	1–2	Friendly game

== Personal life ==
Tamires has one son, Bernardo, with César Britto. She is currently in a relationship with singer Gabi Fernandes.

== Honours ==
Santos

- Liga Nacional: 2007
- Campeonato Paulista: 2007

Centro Olímpico

- Campeonato Brasileiro: 2013

Fortuna Hjørring

- A-Liga: 2015–16, 2017–18
- Danish Cup: 2015–16, 2018–19

Corinthians

- Copa Libertadores: 2019, 2021, 2023
- Campeonato Brasileiro: 2020, 2021, 2022, 2023
- Campeonato Paulista: 2019, 2020, 2021, 2022, 2023
- Supercopa do Brasil: 2022, 2023
- Copa Paulista: 2022

Brazil

- Summer Olympics silver medal: 2024
- Copa América Femenina: 2014, 2018, 2022
- Jogos Pan-Americanos: 2015

Individual

- IFFHS CONMEBOL Women Team of the Decade 2011–2020
- Campeonato Brasileiro Team of the Year: 2019, 2020, 2021, 2022, 2023
- Campeonato Brasileiro Most Beautiful Goal: 2019, 2020
- Copa Libertadores Most Valuable Player: 2021
- Craque da Galera do Campeonato Paulista: 2021
- CONMEBOL Copa Libertadores da América Squad of the Season: 2020, 2021
- Bola de Prata: 2021, 2022, 2024
- Campeonato Brasileiro Finals MVP: 2023
- Samba Gold: 2023, 2024

== See also ==
- List of women's footballers with 100 or more international caps
