= Maressa =

Brazilian footballer

Personal information
- Full name: Maressa Luara de Carvalho
- Date of birth: 9 August 1996 (age 30)
- Place of birth: São Bernardo do Campo, Brazil
- Position: Midfielder

Team information
- Current team: São Paulo
- Number: 8

Youth career
- 2013–2016: Centro Olímpico

Senior career*
Years	Team	Apps	(Gls)
2013–2016	Centro Olímpico	5	(0)
2016	Foz Cataratas	8	(0)
2017	Kindermann	6	(0)
2017–2018	Ponte Preta	34	(8)
2018	Grêmio Audax	3	(1)
2019–2020	Palmeiras	53	(11)
2021–	São Paulo	112	(4)
- * Club domestic league appearances and goals as of 1 February 2025

Maressa Luara de Carvalho (born 9 August 1996), simply known as Maressa, is a Brazilian professional women's footballer who plays as a midfielder for São Paulo.

== Career ==
Revealed by the AD Centro Olímpico, Maressa also played for Foz Cataratas, Kindermann and Ponte Preta, before arriving at Palmeiras, where she was the Copa Paulista champion in 2019. She arrived at São Paulo in 2021 and became one of the players most identified with the club, becoming captain in the following seasons.

== Honours ==
Palmeiras

- Copa Paulista Feminina: 2019

São Paulo

- Brasil Ladies Cup: 2021
- Supercopa do Brasil: 2025
