= Luciana Ortega =

Panamanian footballer (born 2004)

Personal information
- Full name: Luciana Ortega Urriolagoitia
- Date of birth: 10 August 2004 (age 22)
- Place of birth: Barcelona, Spain
- Height: 1.79 m (5 ft 10 in)
- Position: Centre back

Youth career
- 2019–2020: Sunrise Sting
- 2021–2022: Costa del Este
- 2022: Florida West
- 2023–2024: Santos

Senior career*
Years	Team	Apps	(Gls)
2022	CIEX Academy		
2023–2024	Santos	1	(0)

International career^{‡}
2023–	Panama U20	2	(0)
- * Club domestic league appearances and goals as of 23:04, 29 May 2023 (UTC) ‡ National team caps and goals as of 23:04, 29 May 2023 (UTC)

Luciana Ortega Urriolagoitia (born 10 August 2004) is a professional footballer who plays as a central defender. Born in Spain, she represents Panama at youth international level.

== Club career ==
Born in Barcelona, Catalonia, Ortega played for Sunrise Sting SC in the United States, and the Panamanian sides Costa del Este and CIEX Sports Academy. She finished her youth career back in the US, being a part of the under-19 squad of Florida West FC in 2022.

On 31 January 2023, Ortega moved to Brazil and was announced at Santos. She made her professional debut on 27 May, coming on as a second-half substitute for Eliana Stábile in a 6–1 away routing of Ceará.

On 16 December 2023, after being mainly used with the under-20 squad of the Sereias during the year, Ortega suffered an anterior cruciate ligament injury.

== International career ==
With a Panamanian family, Ortega represented Panama at under-20 level, being also called up to the full side for trainings. On 10 April 2023, she was called up by manager Raiza Gutiérrez for the 2023 CONCACAF Women's U-20 Championship qualification matches against Curaçao, the Bahamas and Sint Maarten.

Ortega was a starter against Curaçao (5–1 win), an unused substitute against the Bahamas (13–0 win) and came on against Sint Maarten (11–0 win) as Panama qualified to the final tournament; she could not make it into the final squad, however.
