= Reina Bonta =

Filipino footballer (born 1999)

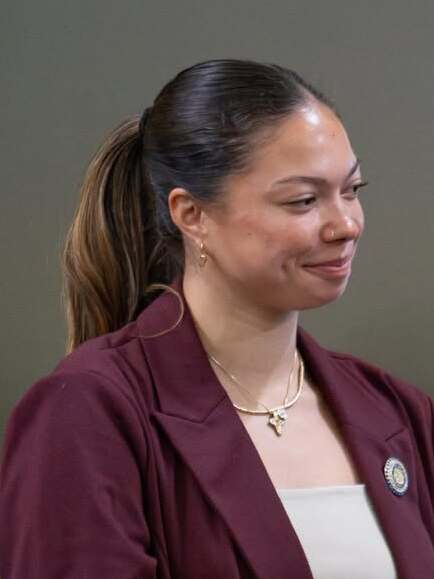
- Bonta in 2026

Personal information
- Full name: Reina Gabriela Villafañe Bonta
- Date of birth: April 17, 1999 (age 27)
- Place of birth: New Haven, Connecticut, U.S.
- Height: 5 ft 8 in (1.72 m)
- Position: Center-back

Youth career
- Bishop O'Dowd High School
- De Anza Force

College career
Years	Team	Apps	(Gls)
2017–2021	Yale Bulldogs	57	(2)

Senior career*
Years	Team	Apps	(Gls)
2022–2023	San Francisco Nighthawks	0	(0)
2023–2024	Santos	16	(0)

International career^{‡}
2022–	Philippines	20	(0)
- * Club domestic league appearances and goals as of March 29, 2024 ‡ National team caps and goals as of September 21, 2026

Reina Gabriela Villafañe Bonta (born April 17, 1999) is a professional footballer and filmmaker who plays as a center-back. Born in the United States, she represents the Philippines at international level.

== Early life ==
Bonta was born in New Haven, Connecticut, and raised in Alameda, California, to a Filipino American father originally from Quezon City and a mother of Puerto Rican descent from New York. Her paternal grandfather was born in the United States, her paternal grandmother in the Philippines and her maternal grandparents in Puerto Rico.

== Career ==
=== College career ===
Like her dad, Bonta played collegiate soccer at Yale University.

=== Club career ===
On March 1, 2023, it was announced that Bonta joined Campeonato Brasileiro de Futebol Feminino club Santos.

== International career ==
Bonta is eligible to represent either United States (where she was born), Philippines (where her father was born) or Puerto Rico (where her maternal grandparents were born) at the international level.

=== Philippines ===
In September 2022, Bonta received a call-up from the Philippines for a friendly against New Zealand. The match ended in a 2–1 defeat for the Philippines, Bonta remained on the bench for the entirety of the match. A month later, she was once again called up for a training camp in Costa Rica. She made her debut for the Philippines in a 1–1 draw against Costa Rica, coming in as a substitute replacing Jessika Cowart on the 85th minute of the match.

Bonta continued to represent the Philippines at the 2023 FIFA Women's World Cup.

== Personal life ==
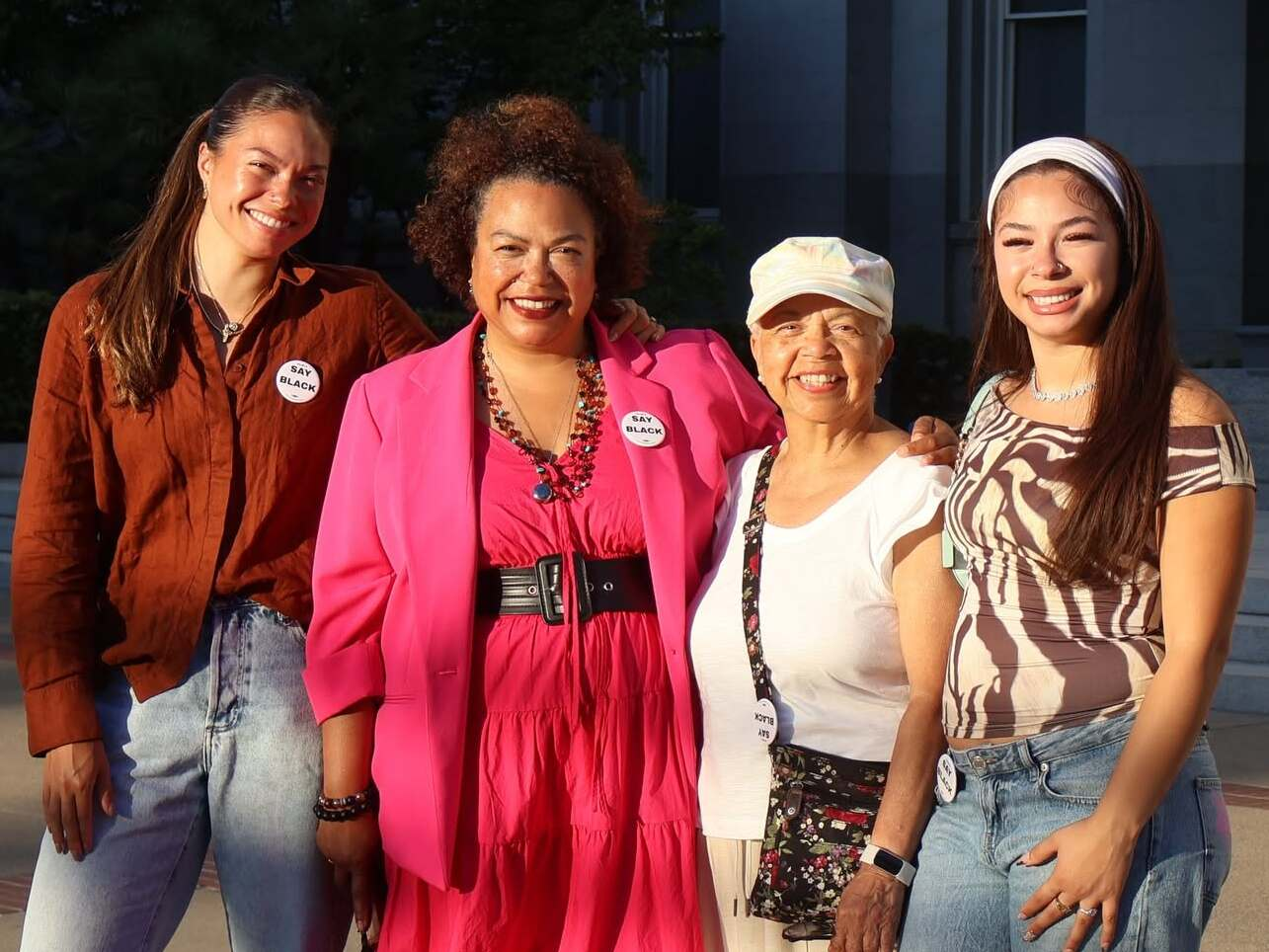
Bonta (far left) with her mother, Mia (center left) and family in 2026.

Bonta belongs to a family of politicians. Her father Rob currently serves as the attorney general of California while her mother Mia currently serves as a member of the California State Assembly. She married fellow footballer Brena in January 2025.

Bonta's short film, Lahi, premiered at the 2022 Hawai'i International Film Festival.

== Honours ==
Santos

- Copa Paulista de Futebol Feminino: 2024
