= Tayla (footballer) =

Brazilian footballer (born 1992)

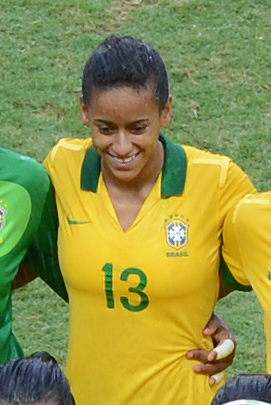

Personal information
- Full name: Tayla Carolina Pereira dos Santos
- Date of birth: 9 May 1992 (age 34)
- Place of birth: Mongaguá, Brazil
- Height: 1.74 m (5 ft 9 in)
- Position: Defender

Team information
- Current team: São Paulo

Senior career*
Years	Team	Apps	(Gls)
2008–2009	Santos		
2010–2012	Foz Cataratas		
2013–2014	Ferroviária	6	(1)
2015	Centro Olímpico	8	(0)
2016	Iranduba	5	(0)
2017–2018	Santos	16	(1)
2019	Benfica	4	(1)
2020–2023	Santos	33	(1)
2024–2025	Grêmio	8	(1)
2026–	São Paulo	0	(0)

International career^{‡}
2012	Brazil U20	3	(0)
2014–2020	Brazil	22	(1)
- * Club domestic league appearances and goals as of 02:38, 13 November 2023 (UTC) ‡ National team caps and goals as of 21:30, 17 April 2021 (UTC)

Tayla Carolina Pereira dos Santos (born 9 May 1992), known as Tayla or sometimes as Diva, is a Brazilian professional footballer who plays as a defender for São Paulo. She was included in Brazil's squad for the 2015 FIFA Women's World Cup.

== Club career ==
Tayla joined Santos in 2008, after a successful trial. She then spent three seasons with Foz Cataratas in 2010, 2011 and 2012. Ahead of the 2013 season, Ferroviária signed Tayla, Beatriz, Rilany and Thaisa, all from Foz Cataratas in a quadruple transfer deal.

Tayla returned to Santos in 2017, after representing Iranduba and Centro Olímpico. On 14 January 2019 she moved abroad, joining Benfica.

Tayla left Benfica in November 2019, after helping in their top tier promotion and winning the Taça de Portugal Feminina. She returned to Santos for a third spell in January 2020.

== International career ==
At the 2012 FIFA U-20 Women's World Cup, Tayla was part of the Brazilian team. Tayla was called into the senior national team squad for the first time in November 2013, for a friendly against the United States at the Florida Citrus Bowl. She made her senior Brazil women's national football team debut on 11 June 2014, a 0–0 friendly draw with France staged in Guyana.

At the 2014 Copa América Femenina, Tayla scored the fourth goal in Brazil's 6–0 rout of Argentina. In February 2015 she was included in an 18-month residency programme intended to prepare Brazil's national team for the 2015 FIFA Women's World Cup in Canada and the 2016 Rio Olympics. Tayla was withdrawn from Brazil's squad for the 2015 Pan American Games due to injury and was sent back to train with her club.

== Career statistics ==
=== International ===
As of 17 April 2021

Brazil
Year	Apps	Goals
Year	Apps	Goals
2014	12	1
2015	3	0
2018	2	0
2019	3	0
2020	2	0
Total	22	1

==== International goals ====
Scores and results list Brazil's goal tally first.

No	Date	Venue	Opponent	Score	Result	Competition
1.	26 September 2014	Estadio Rumiñahui, Sangolquí, Ecuador	Argentina	4–0	6–0	2014 Copa América Femenina

== Honours ==
Santos

- Campeonato Paulista de Futebol Feminino: 2009, 2018
- Campeonato Brasileiro de Futebol Feminino Série A1: 2017
- Copa Paulista: 2020

Ferroviária

- Campeonato Paulista de Futebol Feminino: 2013
- Campeonato Brasileiro de Futebol Feminino Série A1: 2014
- Copa do Brasil de Futebol Feminino: 2014

Benfica

- Campeonato Nacional II Divisão Feminino: 2018–19
- Taça de Portugal Femininal: 2018–19
