= Gi Fernandes =

Brazilian footballer (born 2004)

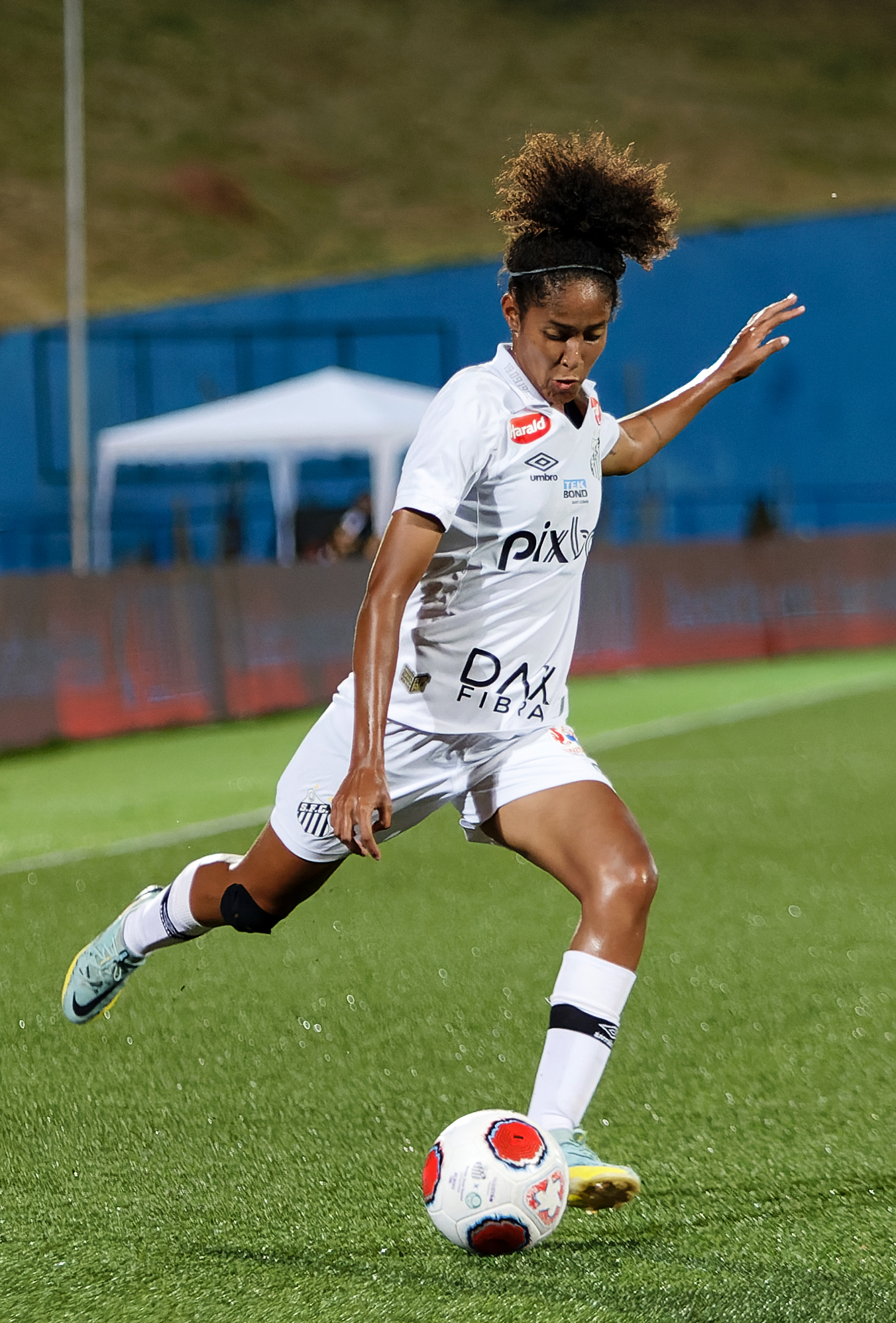

Personal information
- Full name: Giovanna Fernandes Silva
- Date of birth: 23 December 2004 (age 21)
- Place of birth: Praia Grande, Brazil
- Height: 1.72 m (5 ft 8 in)
- Positions: Right back; midfielder

Team information
- Current team: Corinthians

Youth career
- 2018–2021: Santos

Senior career*
Years	Team	Apps	(Gls)
2020–2023	Santos	21	(2)
2024–	Corinthians	3	(0)

International career^{‡}
2022–2024	Brazil U20	10	(3)
2026–	Brazil	1	(0)
- * Club domestic league appearances and goals as of 22:43, 11 April 2024 (UTC) ‡ National team caps and goals as of 21 April 2026 (UTC)

Giovanna "Gi" Fernandes Silva (born 23 December 2004) is a Brazilian professional footballer who plays as a right back or a midfielder for Corinthians.

== Club career ==
=== Santos ===
Born in Praia Grande, São Paulo, Gi Fernandes joined Santos' youth setup in 2018. She was promoted to the senior team in July 2020. Gi Fernandes made her senior debut on 27 September, starting in a 6–0 Campeonato Brasileiro Série A1 home routing of Ponte Preta; aged just 15, she became the youngest player ever to debut for Sereias da Vila, and the second-youngest in Santos' history overall, only behind Coutinho.

On 10 December 2021, Gi Fernandes signed her first professional contract with Santos. She scored her first league goal against RB Bragantino on 19 June 2022, scoring in the 85th minute.

=== Corinthians ===
On 4 January 2024, it was announced that Gi Fernandes signed with Corinthians after her contract ended. She made her league debut for Corinthians against Grêmio on 18 March 2024.

== International career ==
Fernandes made her debut for Brazil U20 against Uruguay on 7 April 2022. She scored her first international goal against Bolivia U20 on 10 April 2022, in the 18th minute.

== Honours ==
=== Club ===
Santos

- Copa Paulista de Futebol Feminino: 2020

=== International ===
Brazil U20

- South American Under-20 Women's Football Championship: 2022, 2024
