= Bruno Silva (football manager) =

Brazilian football manager

Personal information
- Full name: Bruno Vinicius de Freitas Silva
- Date of birth: 19 March 1987 (age 39)
- Place of birth: São Paulo, Brazil

Managerial career
- Years: Team
- 2011–2013: Portuguesa (youth)
- 2013–2016: Corinthians U13
- 2017: Santos U11 (assistant)
- 2018–2019: Santos U11
- 2019: Santos U13
- 2020: Santos U15
- 2021–2022: Santos U16
- 2022–2023: Santos U17 (assistant)
- 2023–2024: Santos (women)
- 2024–2025: Botafogo U16
- 2025: Botafogo U20 (assistant)

Bruno Vinicius de Freitas Silva (born 19 March 1987), known as Bruno Silva, is a Brazilian football coach.

== Career ==
Born in Itaim Paulista, São Paulo, Silva began his career with Portuguesa's youth sides before becoming and under-13 coach at Corinthians in 2013.

In 2017, Silva moved to Santos and became an assistant of the under-11 team. He became the head coach of the side in the following year, before being promoted to the under-13s on 26 April 2019.

In January 2020, Silva was promoted to the under-15s, and later worked with the under-16s and became an assistant of the under-17 squad. On 13 September 2023, he became an interim head coach of the women's team, replacing Kleiton Lima.

On 25 September 2023, after a 5–1 win over Pinda, Silva was permanently appointed as head coach of the Sereias da Vila. The following 1 April, he was dismissed after a poor start in the 2024 Campeonato Brasileiro de Futebol Feminino Série A1.
