= Thaisinha =

Brazilian footballer

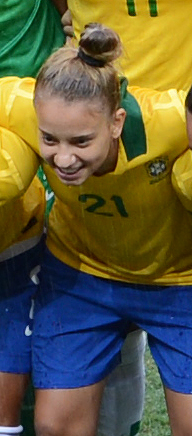
- At the 2013 Torneio Internacional de Brasília

Personal information
- Full name: Thaís Duarte Guedes
- Date of birth: 20 January 1993 (age 33)
- Place of birth: São Paulo, Brazil
- Height: 1.64 m (5 ft 5 in)
- Positions: Forward; attacking midfielder

Team information
- Current team: Santos
- Number: 10

Youth career
- 2005–2008: Juventus-SP

Senior career*
Years	Team	Apps	(Gls)
2008	Juventus-SP		
2009–2010	Santos		
2011	Bangu		
2011–2013	Vitória das Tabocas		
2013–2019	Hyundai Steel Red Angels	26	(12)
2014	→ Vitória das Tabocas (loan)		
2020–	Santos	104	(15)

International career^{‡}
2008–2010	Brazil U17		
2012	Brazil U20	3	(0)
2011	Brazil (University)		(2)
2010–2020	Brazil	58	(6)
Medal record
Representing Brazil
Football
Pan American Games
Silver medal – second place	2011 Guadalajara	Team competition
Universiade
Bronze medal – third place	2011 Shenzhen	Team competition
- * Club domestic league appearances and goals as of 13:12, 24 December 2025 (UTC) ‡ National team caps and goals as of 21:20, 17 April 2021 (UTC)

Thaís Duarte Guedes (born 20 January 1993), known as Thaís Guedes or Thaisinha, is a Brazilian footballer who plays either as a forward or as an attacking midfielder for Santos.

== Club career ==
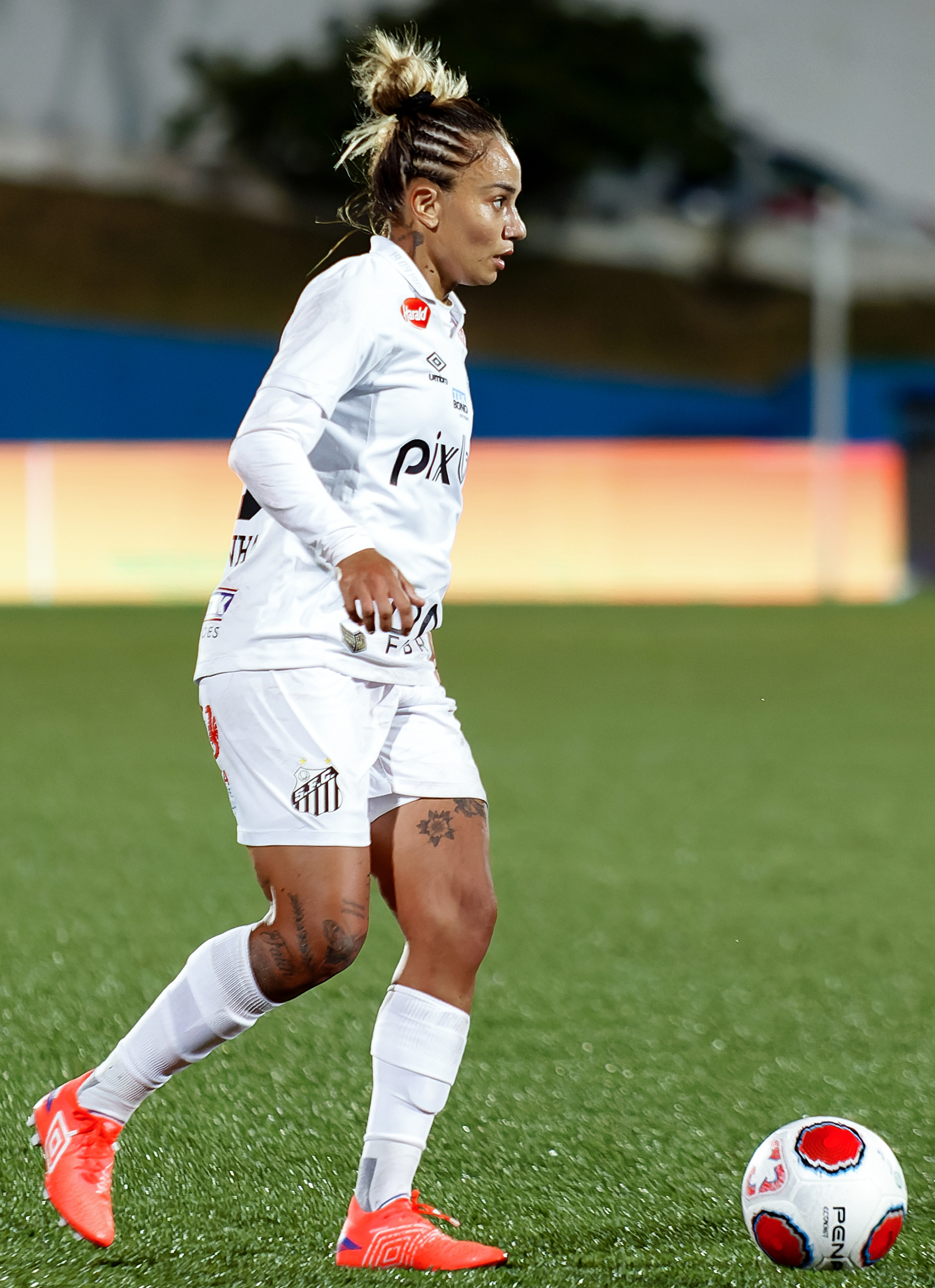
Thaisinha with Santos in 2022

Born in São Paulo, Thaisinha joined the youth sides of Juventus-SP in 2005, aged 12. In late 2008, she was invited by Kleiton Lima to join Santos, where she won two Copa Libertadores Femenina titles in a row.

In 2011, Thaisinha signed for Bangu. She later moved to Vitória das Tabocas in that year, and was a regular starter for the club.

In February 2013, Thaisinha and her teammate Bia Zaneratto were transferred to South Korean club Incheon Hyundai Steel Red Angels. There, she won six WK League titles, five of them in a row, aside from having a short spell back at Vitória on loan in 2014.

On 21 January 2020, Thaisinha returned to the Sereias da Vila. In the following seasons, she was a regular starter and renewed her contract on multiple occasions.

== International career ==
Thaisinha received her first call-up to the Brazil national under-17 team at the age of 13. She was also in the squad of the 2008 and 2010 editions of the FIFA U-17 Women's World Cup, and featured with under-20s in the 2012 FIFA U-20 Women's World Cup.

She made her debut for the senior national team in December 2010, a 3–0 2010 Torneio Internacional Cidade de São Paulo win over Mexico at Pacaembu Stadium. Thaisinha was named in Brazil's squad for the 2011 FIFA Women's World Cup in Germany and participated in the 3–0 group stage win over Equatorial Guinea.

Thaisinha also helped Brazil to win the silver medal in the 2011 Pan American Games, after being a spotlight in the 2011 Summer Universiade. She scored her first international goal on 18 October 2011, netting Brazil's opener in a 2–0 win over Argentina for the former tournament.

Thaisinha was recalled to the national team after a 23-month absence in November 2015. She had returned to form with her Korean club after initially struggling to adapt and suffering several injuries.

== Style of play ==
A skillful forward or an attacking midfielder, Thaisinha's playing style has been compared to that of Neymar. She was also often named as the successor of Marta during her early career.

== Career statistics ==
=== Club ===
As of 3 December 2025

Appearances and goals by club, season and competition
Club	Season	League			State league		Cup		Continental		Other		Total	
Club	Season	Division	Apps	Goals	Apps	Goals	Apps	Goals	Apps	Goals	Apps	Goals	Apps	Goals
Santos	2020	Série A1	12	3	4	0	—		—		—		16	3
Santos	2021	Série A1	0	0	0	0	—		—		—		0	0
Santos	2022	Série A1	15	1	15	5	—		—		—		30	6
Santos	2023	Série A1	17	3	10	1	—		—		—		27	4
Santos	2024	Série A1	12	0	5	0	—		4 (Note: Appearance(s) in Copa Libertadores Femenina)	1	3 (Note: Appearance(s) in Copa Paulista de Futebol Feminino)	1	24	2
Santos	2025	Série A2	7	1	7	1	1	0	—		0	0	15	2
Santos	Total		63	8	41	7	1	0	4	1	3	1	112	17

=== International ===
As of 17 April 2021

National team	Year	Apps	Goals
Brazil	2010	4	0
Brazil	2011	11	3
Brazil	2012	10	0
Brazil	2013	6	0
Brazil	2015	5	0
Brazil	2016	5	1
Brazil	2017	6	1
Brazil	2018	10	1
Brazil	2020	1	0
Total		58	6

==== International goals ====
Scores and results list Brazil's goal tally first.

No	Date	Venue	Opponent	Score	Result	Competition
1.	18 October 2011	Omnilife Stadium, Jalisco, Mexico	Argentina	1–0	2–0	2011 Pan American Games
2.	20 October 2011	Omnilife Stadium, Jalisco, Mexico	Costa Rica	2–0	2–1	2011 Pan American Games
3.	11 December 2011	Pacaembu Stadium, São Paulo, Brazil	Chile	3–0	4–0	2011 International Women's Football Tournament
4.	7 March 2016	Estádio Municipal, Lagos, Portugal	Russia	3–0	3–0	2016 Algarve Cup
5.	28 November 2017	Estadio La Portada, La Serena, Chile	Chile	2–0	3–0	Friendly
6.	16 April 2018	Estadio La Portada, La Serena, Chile	Chile	3–0	3–1	2018 Copa América Femenina

== Honours ==
Santos

- Copa do Brasil de Futebol Feminino: 2009
- Copa Libertadores Femenina: 2009, 2010
- Campeonato Paulista de Futebol Feminino: 2010
- Copa Paulista de Futebol Feminino: 2020, 2024
- Campeonato Brasileiro de Futebol Feminino Série A2: 2025

Vitória das Tabocas

- Campeonato Pernambucano de Futebol Feminino: 2011, 2012, 2013

Hyundai Steel Red Angels

- WK League: 2013, 2013, 2015, 2016, 2017, 2018, 2019

Brazil

- Copa América Femenina: 2018
