= Gláucia (footballer) =

Brazilian footballer (born 1993)

Personal information
- Full name: Gláucia Suelen Silva Cristiano
- Date of birth: 30 January 1993 (age 33)
- Place of birth: São Bernardo do Campo, Brazil
- Height: 1.65 m (5 ft 5 in)
- Position: Forward

Team information
- Current team: Palmeiras
- Number: 10

Senior career*
Years	Team	Apps	(Gls)
–2010	São Bernardo		
2011	Centro Olímpico		
2012	Red Angels		
2013	São Caetano		
2014	São José	0	(0)
2015	Sejong Sportstoto		
2016	São José	3	(4)
2017	Iranduba	9	(6)
2017	Sport Recife		
2018	Hwacheon KSPO		
2019	Santos	16	(14)
2020–2023	São Paulo	45	(15)
2024–2025	Flamengo	15	(4)
- * Club domestic league appearances and goals as of 22:24, 23 March 2025 (UTC)

Gláucia Suelen Silva Cristiano (born 30 January 1993), simply known as Gláucia, is a Brazilian footballer who plays as a forward for Palmeiras.

== Career ==
Before the 2012 season, Gláucia signed for South Korean side Red Angels. Before the 2013 season, she signed for São Caetano in Brazil. Before the 2015 season, she signed for South Korean club Sejong Sportstoto. Before the 2016 season, Gláucia signed for São José in Brazil. Before the 2018 season, she signed for South Korean team Hwacheon KSPO. Before the 2019 season, she signed for Santos in Brazil.

== Personal life ==
During her first unhappy spell in South Korea, Gláucia became overweight and depressed.
