= Taina Maranhão =

Brazilian footballer

Personal information
- Full name: Taina José Lopes
- Date of birth: 18 August 2004 (age 22)
- Place of birth: Criciúma, Brazil
- Height: 1.60 m (5 ft 3 in)
- Position: Forward

Team information
- Current team: Palmeiras
- Number: 29

Youth career
- 2019: Criciúma
- 2019: Avaí
- 2020–2021: Internacional

Senior career*
Years	Team	Apps	(Gls)
2019	Criciúma	0	(0)
2021	Internacional	1	(0)
2022	Cruzeiro	8	(0)
2023	Santos	14	(2)
2024–	Palmeiras	6	(2)

International career^{‡}
2025–	Brazil	12	(4)
- * Club domestic league appearances and goals as of 14:51, 26 April 2024 (UTC) ‡ National team caps and goals as of 22:08, 10 October 2026 (UTC)

Taina José Lopes (born 18 August 2004), known as Taina Maranhão or just Maranhão, is a Brazilian professional footballer who plays as a forward for Brasileirão Feminino club Palmeiras and the Brazil national team.

== Club career ==
=== Criciúma ===
Born in Criciúma, Santa Catarina, Taina Maranhão began her career at hometown side Criciúma, and appeared in three first team matches in the 2019 Campeonato Catarinense de Futebol Feminino.

=== Internacional ===
In 2020, after a short period at Avaí, she moved to Internacional and was initially assigned to the under-18 team.

On 22 March 2021, Taina Maranhão and another ten players were promoted to Inter's first team. She made her league debut against Palmeiras on 5 September 2021. Roughly one year later, Tainá Maranhão left the club.

=== Cruzeiro ===
Taina Maranhão was announced at Cruzeiro on 17 March 2022. She made her league debut against Ferroviária on 24 April 2022.

=== Santos ===
On 12 January 2023, Taina Maranhão was announced as the new signing of Santos. She made her league debut against Flamengo on 24 February 2023. Taina Maranhão scored her first league goal against Cruzeiro on 6 May 2023, scoring in the 65th minute.

=== Palmeiras ===
On 5 January of the following year, she moved to Palmeiras. Taina Maranhão made her league debut against Flamengo on 16 March 2024. She scored her first league goal against Grêmio on 28 March 2024, scoring in the 57th minute.

== Career statistics ==
As of match played 10 October 2026

Appearances and goals by national team and year
National team	Year	Apps	Goals
Brazil	2025	4	0
Brazil	2026	8	4
Total		12	4

List of international goals scored by Taina Maranhão
No.	Date	Venue	Opponent	Score	Result	Competition
1.	27 February 2026	Estadio Alejandro Morera Soto, Alajuela, Costa Rica	Costa Rica	4–2	5–2	Friendly
2.	11 April 2026	Arena Pantanal, Cuiabá, Brazil	South Korea	5–0	5–1	2026 FIFA Series
3.	14 April 2026	Arena Pantanal, Cuiabá, Brazil	Zambia	2–0	6–1	2026 FIFA Series
4.	6 June 2026	Neo Química Arena, São Paulo, Brazil	United States	1–1	2–1	Friendly

== Personal life ==
Taina Maranhão's father Alex Maranhão was also a footballer. A midfielder, he also played for Criciúma, and his daughter inherited his nickname.

== Honours ==
Internacional

- Campeonato Gaúcho de Futebol Feminino: 2021
- South American Under-20 Women's Football Championship: 2024

Palmeiras

- Campeonato Paulista de Futebol Feminino: 2024,2025
- Copa do Brasil de Futebol Feminino: 2025
- Brasil Ladies Cup: 2025
- Supercopa do Brasil de Futebol Feminino: 2026
