= EC São Bernardo =

- Full name: Esporte Clube São Bernardo
- Nicknames: Cachorrão (Big Dog); Vovô (Grandpa)
- Founded: 3 February 1928; 98 years ago
- Ground: Baetão
- Capacity: 5.196
- President: Felipe Cheidde Jr.
- Head coach: Michael (caretaker)
- League: Campeonato Paulista Série A3
- 2025: Paulista Série A3, 13th of 16
- Website: www.ecsaobernardo.com.br
Home colors	Away colors

Esporte Clube São Bernardo, commonly known as EC São Bernardo, Esporte Clube, or Esporte, is a professional football club based in São Bernardo do Campo, São Paulo, Brazil, that plays in the Campeonato Paulista Série A3, the third tier of the São Paulo state league. They were founded in 1928, being the oldest active football club in the ABC Region. They also were the first basketball club in the city (achieving great prominence), as well as in volleyball and futsal.

Despite being based in one of the richest and most populous cities in São Paulo, the club has never been successful at the state level, having spent most of its years in the lower divisions of the Campeonato Paulista and has yet to qualify for any national division. Their highest state league finish was in the 1986 Campeonato Paulista Segunda Divisão, when they finished 3rd in the table, nearly missing promotion for the premier division.

During the 1990s, the club often escaped relegation due to other clubs folding or not meeting the criteria for promotion in upper levels. This and a win drought that lasted over a year brought nationwide attention to the club, which at the time was regarded as the worst performing team in Brazil.

They have a long-standing rivalry with Palestra, with whom they contest the Clássico Batateiro.

== History ==
=== Formation and amateur era (1928–1950) ===
Esporte Clube São Bernardo was founded 3 February 1928, being the oldest active club in the ABC region of São Paulo. The club was founded by members of its former rival, Internacional Futebol Clube, being the successor of Associação Atlética São Bernardo, which was founded in 1917 and dissolved in 1922. In the period of 1922-1928, football in São Bernardo do Campo was reduced to small “lowland” clubs, which disputed a soccer festival every Labor Day (1 May). While watching these festivals, Dante Setti proposed the idea of creating a new club, which could bring together all the sportsmen and fans in the city around a single association. The idea was well received by three young men, all former players of AA São Bernardo and Internacional FC: Nerino Colli, Vicente Ragghianti and Itagiba de Almeida. They ran the city calling a meeting, to be held in the old Cine Enrico Caruso (later, Cine São Bernardo) at Rua Marechal Deodoro. The meeting, which started on February 2, only ended on the 3rd, when Esporte Clube São Bernardo was officially founded.

Thanks to the selflessness of partners and interested parties, São Bernardo quickly consolidates itself among the strongest teams in the region, along with more traditional clubs such as Primeiro de Maio FC and Corinthians FC (Santo André), Ribeirão Pires FC and São Caetano EC. In 1931, a poll of over 58,000 people carried out by the newspaper Diário Nacional named the club "The Most Likeable of the Countryside". The honour elevates the status of São Bernardo, which began being invited to play out of the region and even interstate games. The Cachorrão was the first club in São Bernardo do Campo to play a game outside São Paulo, in May 1930, against Minas Gerais clubs Uberlândia and Uberaba.

During the 1930s, the club decided to enter the then-existing amateur state league, competing in the Campeonato Paulista do Interior (current Campeonato Paulista Amador). These leagues had their member clubs divided regionally into zones. Only the stage winners (sometimes the second-placed team would also qualify, depending on the year) advanced to the next stages, where they faced clubs from other regions. In 1939, São Bernardo was the champion of its zone, which generally included the ABC, the coastside and Mogi das Cruzes regions. The club would repeat the feat even more brilliantly in the following decade, where it was three times champion of its zone, in 1947, 1948 and 1949.

== Stadium ==
EC São Bernardo currently plays its home matches at Baetão, a smaller-capacity stadium with artificial turf. Previously, it played its home matches at Estadio 1º de Maio, which it had leased until 2025, before securing the public concession for Baetão. Neither stadium is owned by the club.

=== Estádio Ítalo Setti (1928-1963) ===
Originally, the field located where the Estádio Ítalo Setti was built was used by other teams in the city, such as Internacional Futebol Clube and Associação Atlética São Bernardo. As both clubs folded in the 1920s, the pitch began to be used by local amateur teams. When Esporte Clube São Bernardo was founded in 1928, they also played their home games at the same location.

On 14 June 1941, landowner Ítalo Setti donated the 16,000 m² area to EC São Bernardo in exchange for two conditions: that the stadium should be named after him and, should EC São Bernardo ever cease its activities, the land would be returned back to its previous owners. The club then built its structure at the site, including the aforementioned stadium and basketball and volleyball courts. The Estádio Ítalo Setti was the most modern stadium in the region, being the first one to feature floodlights for night games.
