= Associação Desportiva Centro Olímpico =

Centro Olímpico
- Full name: Associação Desportiva Centro Olímpico
- Founded: 2000; 25 years ago
- Ground: Distrital Centro Olímpico, Moema, São Paulo
- Capacity: 1,500
- Manager: Arthur Elias
- 2014: Campeonato Brasileiro de Futebol Feminino, 3rd
- Website: http://www.adcentroolimpico.com.br/futebol
Home colours	Away colours

Associação Desportiva Centro Olímpico, commonly known as Centro Olímpico or by the acronym Adeco, is a professional women's association football club based in São Paulo, Brazil. Founded in March 2000 as a youth team, they affiliated to São Paulo's Centre of Olympic Training and Research (Portuguese: Centro Olímpico de Treinamente e Pesquisa; COTP) under director "Magic" Paula Silva in January 2001. The club won the inaugural Campeonato Brasileiro de Futebol Feminino in 2013.

== History ==
Coach Arthur Elias established an open-age team in 2011, who finished as Campeonato Paulista runners-up in their first season. The roster was significantly bolstered ahead of the 2012 season, with the addition of ten players from Paulista champions Santos, who had been disbanded. This included national team players Érika and Maurine. The local government and the Brazilian Football Confederation (CBF) sourced funding and sponsorship for the team, designed to help elite players prepare for the 2012 London Olympics.

In 2012 the club were runners-up in the Copa do Brasil, losing a two-legged final 1–0 and 4–2 to São Paulo state rivals São José. São José also won the Campeonato Paulista for the first time in 2012, beating Centro Olímpico in the final.

In 2013 the players were unpaid for three months when sponsors dropped out, before reduced wages were agreed. Cristiane signed for the club in June 2013. Vitória das Tabocas defeated the club in the Copa do Brasil semi-finals, but the inaugural Campeonato Brasileiro de Futebol Feminino was secured with a 4–3 aggregate final win over São José.

== 2020 Squad ==
As of 29 August 2020.

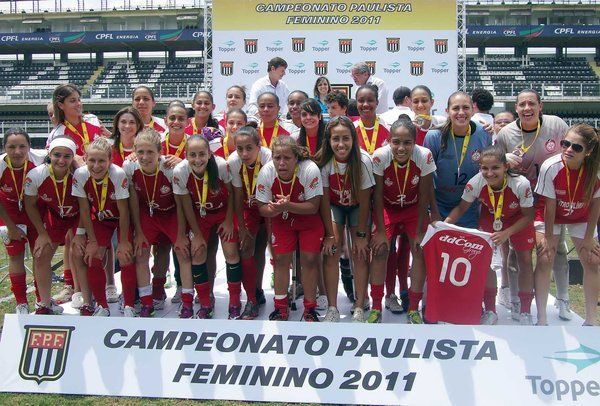
Campeonato Paulista runners-up in 2011

No.	Position	Nation	Player
1	GK	(Brazil) BRA	Monique
3	DF	(Brazil) BRA	Ana Carolina
10	FW	(Brazil) BRA	Dai
13	DF	(Brazil) BRA	Kelly Rodrigues
16	MF	(Brazil) BRA	Gabi Lira
17	MF	(Brazil) BRA	Fernanda
19	FW	(Brazil) BRA	Luize

=== Former players ===
For details of current and former players, see Category:Associação Desportiva Centro Olímpico players.

=== Staff ===
Technical director:

- (Brazil) Arthur José Ribas Elias

Assistant coach:

- (Brazil) Rodrigo Iglesias

Fitness coach:

- (Brazil) Marcelo Rossetti

Goalkeeper coach:

- (Brazil) Alexandre Cruz

== Honours ==
=== Official tournaments ===
National
Competitions	Titles	Seasons
Campeonato Brasileiro Série A1	1	2013

=== Youth team ===
- Fiesta CONMEBOL Evolución Sub-14 (2): 2019, 2020
- Liga de Desenvolvimento Sub-14 (2): 2018, 2019
- Festival Paulista Sub-14 (1): 2018
- Festival Paulista Sub-12 (1): 2023
