= 2026 Santos FC (women) season =

Santos
2026 season
- President: Marcelo Teixeira
- Head coach: Caio Couto (until 24 April); Marcelo Frigerio (from 25 April)
- Stadium: Vila Belmiro
- Campeonato Brasileiro Série A1: 12th
- Paulistão F: 6th
- Copa do Brasil: Third round
- Top goalscorer: League: Laryh (5 goals); All: Carol Baiana; Laryh (5 goals each)
- Highest home attendance: 2,922 (vs Internacional, 1 May)
- Lowest home attendance: 69 (vs Flamengo, 16 Aug)
Home colours	Away colours	Third colours

The 2026 season is Santos FC's 27th season in existence and the club's first season in the top tier of Brazilian football after achieving promotion the previous year. As well as the Campeonato Brasileiro Série A1, the club compete in the Campeonato Paulista and in the Copa do Brasil.

== Players ==
=== Squad information ===
As of 25 September 2026

N	Name	Pos.	Nat.	Place of Birth	Date of Birth (Age)	Caps	Goals	Signed from	Date signed	Contract End
Goalkeepers
1	Stefane	GK	(Brazil)	Rio de Janeiro (Rio de Janeiro (state))	12 May 1999 (age 27)	19	0	NSU Sharks (United States)	2 July 2024	31 December 2027
12	Mayara	GK	(Brazil)	Curitiba (Paraná (state))	3 August 2001 (age 25)	1	0	Internacional	13 January 2026	31 December 2026
31	Taty Amaro	GK	(Brazil)	Uruaçu (Goiás)	10 May 1995 (age 31)	24	0	Cruzeiro	6 January 2026	31 December 2027
Defenders
2	Larissa Vasconcelos	LB/LW	(Brazil)	Abaetetuba (Pará)	2 July 2001 (age 25)	83	3	Cruzeiro	25 January 2024	31 December 2027
3	Rafa Martins	CB/LB	(Brazil)	Santa Luzia (Minas Gerais)	17 July 1999 (age 27)	46	1	Ljuboten (North Macedonia)	31 July 2024	31 December 2026
4	Ana Alice	CB	(Brazil)	Porto Firme (Minas Gerais)	14 March 1989 (age 37)	51	5	São Paulo	9 January 2025	31 December 2026
6	Isa Cardoso	CB	(Brazil)	Campinas (São Paulo (state))	11 December 1997 (age 28)	13	1	Nacional (Uruguay)	19 January 2026	31 December 2026
14	Leandra	LB	(Brazil)	Rio de Janeiro (Rio de Janeiro (state))	13 December 2004 (age 21)	13	0	Fluminense	11 March 2025	31 December 2027
16	Barbara Cuzzuol	RB	(Brazil)	São Paulo (São Paulo (state))	16 July 2004 (age 22)	16	0	Youth system	20 December 2024	31 December 2027
18	Letícia Santos	RB	(Brazil)	Atibaia (São Paulo (state))	2 December 1994 (age 31)	16	0	Corinthians	10 January 2026	31 December 2026
21	Ingryd Avancini	CB	(Brazil)	São Paulo (São Paulo (state))	21 December 1998 (age 27)	6	0	Red Bull Bragantino	9 January 2025	31 December 2026
22	Evellyn Marques	RB	(Brazil)	Rio de Janeiro (Rio de Janeiro (state))	14 May 1998 (age 28)	36	0	Athletico Paranaense	16 January 2025	31 December 2026
27	Carol Lara	RB/RW	(Brazil)	Conselheiro Lafaiete (Minas Gerais)	13 August 2003 (age 23)	5	0	Red Bull Bragantino	26 January 2024	31 December 2026
33	Pardal	CB	(Brazil)	São Paulo (São Paulo (state))	8 October 1993 (age 33)	26	2	Colo-Colo (Chile)	21 January 2025	31 December 2026
38	Sara	CB	(Brazil)	Campinas (São Paulo (state))	27 November 2007 (age 18)	1	0	Youth system	21 November 2025	30 September 2028
97	Katrine	LB/LM	(Brazil)	Fortaleza (Ceará)	19 April 1998 (age 28)	23	1	Internacional	13 January 2026	31 December 2027
Midfielders
5	Nath Pitbull	DM/CB	(Brazil)	Jundiaí (São Paulo (state))	4 June 1995 (age 31)	70	6	3B da Amazônia	16 May 2024	31 December 2026
8	Suzane Pires	CM/AM	(Portugal)	São Paulo (São Paulo (state))	17 August 1992 (age 34)	122	12	Ferroviária	29 January 2024	31 December 2027
10	Thaisinha	AM/RW	(Brazil)	São Paulo (São Paulo (state))	20 January 1993 (age 33)	206	80	HS Red Angels (South Korea)	21 January 2022	31 December 2026
25	Vivian	AM	(Brazil)	Osasco (São Paulo (state))	21 April 1997 (age 29)	15	0	São Paulo	16 January 2026	31 December 2026
32	Giulia Giovanna	AM	(Brazil)	Brasília (Federal District (Brazil))	27 March 2004 (age 22)	8	0	Internacional	10 January 2025	31 December 2026
35	Luiza Maria	DM	(Brazil)	São Pedro (São Paulo (state))	13 May 2005 (age 21)	1	1	Youth system	21 November 2025	31 December 2026
70	Yoreli Rincón	AM/LW	(Colombia)	Piedecuesta	27 July 1993 (age 33)	18	1	Palmeiras	13 January 2026	31 December 2027
88	Rafa Andrade	DM/RB	(Brazil)	Sousa (Paraíba)	2 May 1997 (age 29)	38	6	Cruzeiro	15 January 2025	31 December 2026
—	Gabi Leveque	AM	(Brazil)	Goiânia (Goiás)	5 February 2005 (age 21)	0	0	Youth system	11 April 2024	31 December 2026
Forwards
7	Ketlen	RW/LW	(Brazil)	Rio Fortuna (Santa Catarina (state))	7 January 1992 (age 34)	370	210	Boston Breakers (United States)	20 January 2021	31 December 2026
9	Carol Baiana	ST/RW	(Brazil)	Petrolina (Pernambuco)	28 October 1994 (age 32)	76	24	Cruzeiro	26 January 2024	31 December 2026
11	Laryh	ST	(Brazil)	Rio de Janeiro (Rio de Janeiro (state))	1 November 1987 (age 39)	81	26	São Paulo	22 January 2025	31 December 2026
13	Samara	RW/RB	(Brazil)	Rio Verde (Goiás)	4 October 2006 (age 20)	41	1	Youth system	13 August 2024	31 December 2027
15	Wendy Bonilla	LW/RW	(Colombia)	Buenaventura	8 July 2002 (age 24)	3	0	UNAM (Mexico)	11 August 2026	31 December 2026
17	Analuyza	RW/AM	(Brazil)	Cristalina (Goiás)	14 April 2004 (age 22)	75	11	Internacional	10 January 2025	31 December 2027
19	Mariana Larroquette	ST	(Argentina)	Ituzaingó	24 October 1992 (age 34)	21	3	Orlando Pride (United States)	21 January 2026	31 December 2027
29	Anna Cury	LW/AM	(Brazil)	Ituiutaba (Minas Gerais)	5 February 2006 (age 20)	5	1	Youth system	2 August 2025	31 December 2028
30	Ana Barboza	RW/LW	(Brazil)	Angra dos Reis (Rio de Janeiro (state))	30 April 2005 (age 21)	4	0	Youth system	30 January 2025	31 December 2026
34	Evelin Bonifácio	LW/AM	(Brazil)	Peruíbe (São Paulo (state))	8 April 2008 (age 18)	25	3	Youth system	13 August 2025	31 December 2027
37	Camile Abreu	RW/AM	(Brazil)	Piracicaba (São Paulo (state))	23 March 2007 (age 19)	14	1	Youth system	19 April 2024	31 December 2027

Source: SantosFC.com.br (for appearances and goals), FPF (for contracts).

=== Appearances and goals ===
No.	Pos.	Nat	Name	Brasileirão		Paulistão F		Copa do Brasil		Total	
No.	Pos.	Nat	Name	Apps	Goals	Apps	Goals	Apps	Goals	Apps	Goals
1	GK	(Brazil)	Stefane	0	0	0	0	0	0	0	0
12	GK	(Brazil)	Mayara	0	0	1	0	0	0	1	0
31	GK	(Brazil)	Taty Amaro	17	0	6	0	1	0	24	0
2	DF	(Brazil)	Larissa Vasconcelos	10+7	0	6+1	0	1	0	25	0
3	DF	(Brazil)	Rafa Martins	8+4	0	4	0	1	0	17	0
4	DF	(Brazil)	Ana Alice	17	1	4+1	0	1	0	23	1
6	DF	(Brazil)	Isa Cardoso	9	1	3+1	0	0	0	13	1
14	DF	(Brazil)	Leandra	0	0	0	0	0	0	0	0
16	DF	(Brazil)	Barbara Cuzzuol	0	0	0	0	0	0	0	0
18	DF	(Brazil)	Letícia Santos	7+3	0	4+1	0	1	0	16	0
21	DF	(Brazil)	Ingryd Avancini	1	0	0	0	0	0	1	0
22	DF	(Brazil)	Evellyn Marques	6+3	0	1+1	0	0	0	11	0
27	DF	(Brazil)	Carol Lara	0+3	0	0+2	0	0	0	5	0
97	DF	(Brazil)	Katrine	14+1	1	6+1	0	1	0	23	1
5	MF	(Brazil)	Nath Pitbull	5+7	0	2+2	0	0+1	0	17	0
8	MF	(Portugal)	Suzane Pires	15	2	6	0	1	0	22	2
10	MF	(Brazil)	Thaisinha	0+2	0	0+2	0	0	0	4	0
25	MF	(Brazil)	Vivian	6+5	0	2+2	0	0	0	15	0
32	MF	(Brazil)	Giulia Giovanna	0+1	0	0+1	0	0	0	2	0
35	MF	(Brazil)	Luiza Maria	0	0	0	0	0	0	0	0
70	MF	(Colombia)	Yoreli Rincón	9+4	0	2+2	1	0+1	0	16	1
88	MF	(Brazil)	Rafa Andrade	4+1	0	2+1	1	0	0	7	1
7	FW	(Brazil)	Ketlen	2+3	3	1+1	1	0	0	7	4
9	FW	(Brazil)	Carol Baiana	10+7	3	3+2	1	1	1	23	5
11	FW	(Brazil)	Laryh	9+7	5	2+4	0	1	0	23	5
13	FW	(Brazil)	Samara	4+3	0	3+2	0	0	0	12	0
15	FW	(Colombia)	Wendy Bonilla	2	0	1	0	0	0	3	0
17	FW	(Brazil)	Analuyza	5+7	0	5+2	2	0+1	0	20	2
19	FW	(Argentina)	Mariana Larroquette	8+7	3	2+3	0	0+1	0	21	3
20	FW	(Brazil)	Eudimilla	5+6	0	3	0	1	0	15	0
29	FW	(Brazil)	Anna Cury	0+1	1	0	0	0+1	0	2	1
30	FW	(Brazil)	Ana Barboza	0+1	0	0	0	0	0	1	0
34	FW	(Brazil)	Evelin Bonifácio	12+1	2	5+1	0	1	0	20	2
37	FW	(Brazil)	Camile Abreu	0	0	0	0	0	0	0	0

Last updated: 25 September 2026
Source: Match reports in Competitive matches, Soccerway

=== Goalscorers ===
Ran	No.	Pos	Nat	Name	Brasileirão	Paulistão F	Copa do Brasil	Total
1	9	FW	(Brazil)	Carol Baiana	3	1	1	5
1	11	FW	(Brazil)	Laryh	5	0	0	5
2	7	FW	(Brazil)	Ketlen	3	1	0	4
3	19	FW	(Argentina)	Mariana Larroquette	3	0	0	3
4	8	MF	(Portugal)	Suzane Pires	2	0	0	2
4	17	FW	(Brazil)	Analuyza	0	2	0	2
4	34	FW	(Brazil)	Evelin Bonifácio	2	0	0	2
5	4	DF	(Brazil)	Ana Alice	1	0	0	1
5	6	DF	(Brazil)	Isa Cardoso	1	0	0	1
5	29	FW	(Brazil)	Anna Cury	1	0	0	1
5	70	MF	(Colombia)	Yoreli Rincón	0	1	0	1
5	88	MF	(Brazil)	Rafa Andrade	0	1	0	1
5	97	DF	(Brazil)	Katrine	1	0	0	1
Total					22	6	1	29

Last updated: 25 September 2026
Source: Match reports in Competitive matches, Soccerway

=== Disciplinary record ===
N	Nat	Pos	Name	Brasileirão A2			Paulistão F			Copa do Brasil			Total		
N	Nat	Pos	Name	Yellow card	(yellow card) (yellow-red card)	Red card	Yellow card	(yellow card) (yellow-red card)	Red card	Yellow card	(yellow card) (yellow-red card)	Red card	Yellow card	(yellow card) (yellow-red card)	Red card
5	(Brazil)	MF	Nath Pitbull	2	0	1	2	1	0	0	0	0	4	1	1
8	(Portugal)	MF	Suzane Pires	3	0	0	1	1	0	1	0	0	5	1	0
3	(Brazil)	DF	Rafa Martins	3	0	0	0	0	0	1	0	0	4	0	0
18	(Brazil)	DF	Letícia Santos	4	0	0	0	0	0	0	0	0	4	0	0
31	(Brazil)	GK	Taty Amaro	3	0	0	0	0	0	1	0	0	4	0	0
2	(Brazil)	DF	Larissa Vasconcelos	1	0	0	1	0	0	1	0	0	3	0	0
4	(Brazil)	DF	Ana Alice	2	0	0	1	0	0	0	0	0	3	0	0
6	(Brazil)	DF	Isa Cardoso	3	0	0	1	0	0	0	0	0	4	0	0
17	(Brazil)	FW	Analuyza	3	0	0	0	0	0	0	0	0	3	0	0
34	(Brazil)	FW	Evelin Bonifácio	3	0	0	0	0	0	0	0	0	3	0	0
88	(Brazil)	MF	Rafa Andrade	3	0	0	0	0	0	0	0	0	3	0	0
97	(Brazil)	DF	Katrine	2	0	0	1	0	0	0	0	0	3	0	0
9	(Brazil)	FW	Carol Baiana	0	0	0	2	0	0	0	0	0	2	0	0
22	(Brazil)	DF	Evellyn Marques	2	0	0	0	0	0	0	0	0	2	0	0
19	(Argentina)	FW	Mariana Larroquette	1	0	0	0	0	0	0	0	0	1	0	0
20	(Brazil)	FW	Eudimilla	0	0	0	0	0	0	1	0	0	1	0	0
25	(Brazil)	MF	Vivian	0	0	0	1	0	0	0	0	0	1	0	0
TOTALS				33	0	1	10	2	0	5	0	0	48	2	1

== Coaches ==
Name	Nat.	Place of Birth	Date of Birth (Age)	Signed from	Date signed	Role	G	W	D	L	%	Departure	Manner	Contract End
Caio Couto	(Brazil)	Rio de Janeiro (Rio de Janeiro (state))	29 January 1976 (age 50)	Portuguesa-RJ (men's)	16 September 2024	Permanent	7	2	4	1	28.57	24 April 2026	Sacked	31 December 2026
Bruno Barbosa	(Brazil)	Nova Iguaçu (Rio de Janeiro (state))	13 May 1985 (age 41)	Staff	27 April 2026	Interim (Note: Interim for the match against Palmeiras as Frigerio was not registered on time)	1	0	1	0	0.00	27 April 2026	Return (Note: Back to assistant role after the match)	—N/a
Marcelo Frigerio	(Brazil)	Milan (Italy)	30 January 1971 (age 55)	Free agent	25 April 2026	Permanent	17	6	4	7	35.29			31 December 2026

== Transfers ==
=== Transfers in ===
N.	Pos.	Name	Age	Moving from	Source
31	GK	(Brazil) Taty Amaro	30	(Brazil) Cruzeiro	
70	AM	(Colombia) Yoreli Rincón	32	(Brazil) Palmeiras	
18	RB	(Brazil) Letícia Santos	31	(Brazil) Corinthians	
20	ST	(Brazil) Eudimilla	24	(Brazil) Corinthians	
12	GK	(Brazil) Mayara	24	(Brazil) Internacional	
97	LB	(Brazil) Katrine	27	(Brazil) Internacional	
25	AM	(Brazil) Vivian	28	(Brazil) Red Bull Bragantino	
6	CB	(Brazil) Isa Cardoso	28	(Uruguay) Nacional	
19	ST	(Argentina) Mariana Larroquette	33	(United States) Orlando Pride	
14	LB	(Brazil) Leandra	21	(Brazil) Mirassol (loan return)	
15	LW	(Colombia) Wendy Bonilla	24	(Mexico) UNAM	

=== Transfers out ===
N.	Pos.	Name	Age	Moving to	Source
18	DM	(Brazil) Júlia	24	(Brazil) Mirassol	
15	RB	(Brazil) Leidiane	32	Free agent	
36	RB	(Brazil) Lívia Mathias	22	(Brazil) Mixto	
—	GK	(Brazil) Ágatha Basilio	22	(Brazil) Mirassol	
1	GK	(Brazil) Karen Hipólito	32	(Brazil) Itabirito	
20	AM	(Brazil) Nicole Marussi	21	(Brazil) Corinthians (loan return)	
31	GK	(Brazil) Agatha	21	(Brazil) Real HEIPS	
6	CB	(Brazil) Raissa Calheiros	21	Free agent	
14	LB	(Brazil) Leandra	21	(Brazil) Mirassol (loan)	
—	CB	(Brazil) Emily Apolinário	21	Free agent	
—	GK	(Brazil) Michelle	22	Free agent	
—	AM	(Brazil) Kauany	21	Free agent	
20	ST	(Brazil) Eudimilla	25	(Mexico) Pachuca (US$ 350,000)	

== Pre-season and friendlies ==
Win Draw Loss Fixtures

== Competitions ==
=== Campeonato Brasileiro Série A1 ===
==== League table ====
Pos	Team	Pld	W	D	L	GF	GA	GD	Pts
10	Red Bull Bragantino	17	8	2	7	30	26	+4	26
11	Fluminense	17	7	5	5	23	19	+4	26
12	Santos	17	6	5	6	22	23	−1	23
13	Atlético Mineiro	17	4	4	9	17	25	−8	16
14	Mixto	17	2	6	9	10	27	−17	12

Source: CBF

==== Results summary ====
Overall								Home						Away					
Pld	W	D	L	GF	GA	GD	Pts	W	D	L	GF	GA	GD	W	D	L	GF	GA	GD
17	6	5	6	22	23	−1	23	3	2	3	13	10	+3	3	3	3	9	13	−4

==== Matches ====
16 February 1	Santos	2–1	Grêmio	Santos
19:00	Katrine 4'; Ana Alice 20'; Rafa Andrade (yellow card) 37'; Suzane Pires (yellow card) 54'	Report	(yellow card) 22' Dani Barão; (yellow card) 29' Arrieta; 70' Allyne	Stadium: Vila Belmiro; Attendance: 2,006; Referee: Andreza Helena de Siqueira

23 February 2	Cruzeiro	1–1	Santos	Sete Lagoas
19:00	Gaby Soares 81'; Mari Andrade (yellow card) 86'	Report	29' Carol Baiana; (yellow card) 39' Rafa Andrade; (yellow card) 90+1' Caio Couto; (yellow card) 90+5' Larissa Vasconcelos	Stadium: Arena do Jacaré; Attendance: 971; Referee: Jenifer Alves de Freitas

16 March 3	Santos	3–0	Mixto	Santos
19:00	Larroquette 46'; Evelin Bonifácio (yellow card) 63'; Katrine (yellow card) 66'; Suzane Pires 69'; Isa Cardoso 86'	Report	(red card) 90+2' Nayara	Stadium: Vila Belmiro; Attendance: 210; Referee: Gleika Oliveira Pinheiro

21 March 4	Bahia	3–1	Santos	Salvador
16:00	Rute Deveza (yellow card) 39'; Carballo 59'; Gica 80'; Dani Silva 90+1'	Report	(yellow card) 21' Evellyn Marques; 54' Larroquette; (yellow card) 65' Nath Pitbull	Stadium: Pituaçu; Attendance: 200; Referee: Ruthyanna Camila Medeiros da Silva

27 March 5	Santos	1–1	Ferroviária	Santos
19:00	Suzane Pires (yellow card) 16'; Larroquette 29'; Katrine (yellow card) 44'; Evelin Bonifácio (yellow card) 57'; Analuyza (yellow card) 83'; Isa Cardoso (yellow card) 90+2'	Report	7', (yellow card) 40' Katiuscia; (yellow card) 82' Mariana Santos; (yellow card) 90+3' Andressa	Stadium: Vila Belmiro; Attendance: 639; Referee: Francielly Fernanda Lima de Castro

3 April 6	Botafogo	1–1	Santos	Rio de Janeiro
21:00	Natane 31'; Rebeca (yellow card) 45'; Débora Bebê (yellow card) 70'	Report	18' Evelin Bonifácio	Stadium: Nilton Santos; Attendance: 84; Referee: Eliane Nogueira dos Santos

20 April 7	Santos	1–1	Atlético Mineiro	Santos
19:00	Carol Baiana 11'; Letícia Santos (yellow card) 43'	Report	(yellow card) 3' Diovanna; 56' Giovanna Barraca; (yellow card) 65' Pimenta; (yellow card) 70' Lari Sanchez; (yellow card) 90+7' (yellow-red card) 90+8' Iasmin Paixão	Stadium: Vila Belmiro; Attendance: 2,466; Referee: Andressa Hartmann

27 April 8	Palmeiras	0–0	Santos	São Paulo
20:00	Raíssa Bahia (yellow card) 29'; Poliana (red card) 37'	Report	(yellow card) 29' Larroquette; (yellow card) 45' Ana Alice; (yellow card) 45+4' Suzane Pires; (yellow card) 53' Nath Pitbull; (yellow card) 54' Taty Amaro; (yellow card) 70' Isa Cardoso; (yellow card) 77' Evellyn Marques	Stadium: Allianz Parque; Attendance: 1,469; Referee: Thayslane de Melo Costa

1 May 9	Santos	0–3	Internacional	Santos
16:00	Isa Cardoso (yellow card) 14'	Report	5', (yellow card) 45+1' Jaimes; (yellow card) 17' Soll; 29' Darlene; 45+6' Valéria; (yellow card) 68' Lelê	Stadium: Vila Belmiro; Attendance: 2,922; Referee: Rejane Caetano da Silva

9 May 10	Fluminense	0–2	Santos	Rio de Janeiro
16:00	Gislaine (yellow card) 47'	Report	(yellow card) 42' Letícia Santos; 52' Evelin Bonifácio; (yellow card) 70' Taty Amaro; 90' Laryh	Stadium: Luso Brasileiro; Attendance: 92; Referee: Cassia França de Souza

15 May 11	Santos	0–1	Red Bull Bragantino	Santos
20:00	Letícia Santos (yellow card) 21'; Rafa Martins (yellow card) 45+3'; Ana Alice (yellow card) 63'	Report	(yellow card) 22' Mylena Pedroso; 87' (pen.), (yellow card) 88' Del Trecco; (yellow card) 89' Carol Tavares; (yellow card) 90+1' Jéssica Soares	Stadium: Vila Belmiro; Attendance: 349; Referee: Ruthyanna Camila Medeiros da Silva

25 May 12	São Paulo	3–0	Santos	Cotia
17:30	Aline Milene 14'; Isa Guimarães 29'; Rafa Soares (yellow card) 45+4'; Crivelari 75'	Report	(yellow card) 69' Evelin Bonifácio	Stadium: Marcelo Portugal Gouvêa; Attendance: 110; Referee: Rejane Caetano da Silva

25 July 13	América Mineiro	0–1	Santos	Belo Horizonte
15:00	Giselly (yellow card) 34'; Sandy Monteiro (yellow card) 86'	Report	89' Laryh; (yellow card) 90+5' Rafa Andrade	Stadium: Arena Independência; Attendance: 161; Referee: Gleika Oliveira Pinheiro

2 August 14	Santos	4–0	Juventude	Santos
11:00	Suzane Pires 21'; Analuyza (yellow card) 14'; Laryh 65'; Ketlen 77'; Cury 89'	Report	(yellow card) 56' Paloma Lemos	Stadium: Vila Belmiro; Attendance: 641; Referee: Suanny Aires de Sousa

9 August 15	Corinthians	4–1	Santos	São Paulo
20:30	Aquino 11'; Thaís Ferreira 45+1'; Vic Albuquerque (yellow card) 50'; Robledo 76'; Rhaizza 90+3'	Report	78' Ketlen; (yellow card) 90+1' Analuyza	Stadium: Parque São Jorge; Attendance: 2,762; Referee: Francielly Fernanda Lima de Castro

16 August 16	Santos	2–3	Flamengo	Diadema
11:00	Laryh 20'; Katrine (yellow card) 41'; Letícia Santos (yellow card) 43'; Carol Baiana 84'; Rafa Martins (yellow card) 90+2'	Report	9' Fernanda; (yellow card) 37' Leticia Oliveira; 55' Cristiane; 72' (yellow card) 90+3' Djeni	Stadium: Arena Inamar; Attendance: 69; Referee: Tainan Bordignon Somensi

22 August 17	Vitória	1–2	Santos	Salvador
18:00	Vanessa Pipoca (yellow card) 41'; Milena Monteiro 45+2'; Maria Fonseca (yellow card) 82'; Yasmin Cristini (red card)	Report	19' Ketlen; 56' Laryh; (red card) 77' Nath Pitbull; (yellow card) 80' Taty Amaro; (yellow card) 90+10' Rafa Andrade	Stadium: Barradão; Attendance: 126; Referee: Michelle Peixoto Safatle

=== Copa do Brasil ===
==== Third round ====
28 May Group 40	Atlético Piauiense	1–1 (5–4 p)	Santos	Teresina
16:00	Lilian (yellow card) 27'; Natalinha 78'	Report	(yellow card) 7' Eudimilla; (yellow card) 52' Suzane Pires; (yellow card) 56' Rafa Martins; 60' Carol Baiana; (yellow card) 63' Taty Amaro; (yellow card) 72' Larissa Vasconcelos	Stadium: Lindolfo Monteiro; Attendance: 169; Referee: Thayslane de Melo Costa
	Penalties
	Natalinha (penalty scored); Edilene (penalty scored); Letícia Pires (penalty scored); Quintana (penalty scored); Claudia Steffany (penalty scored)		(penalty scored) Analuyza; (penalty scored) Larroquette; (penalty scored) Rafa Martins; (penalty scored) Nath Pitbull; (penalty missed) Rincón

=== Paulistão F ===
==== Results summary ====
Overall								Home						Away					
Pld	W	D	L	GF	GA	GD	Pts	W	D	L	GF	GA	GD	W	D	L	GF	GA	GD
7	2	3	2	6	6	0	9	2	1	0	2	0	+2	0	2	2	4	6	−2

==== First stage ====
Pos	Team	Pld	W	D	L	GF	GA	GD	Pts	Qualification
3	Corinthians	7	4	1	2	20	8	+12	13	Qualified to the play-in
4	São Paulo	7	4	0	3	7	7	0	12	Qualified to the play-in
5	Santos	7	2	3	2	6	6	0	9	Qualified to the play-in
6	Red Bull Bragantino	7	1	4	2	5	13	−8	7	Qualified to the play-in
7	Taubaté	7	1	1	5	8	15	−7	4	Eliminated; qualified to the Copa Paulista

Updated to match(es) played on 25 September 2026. Source: FPF
Rules for classification: 1) points; 2) wins; 3) total goals difAFEence; 4) total goals scored; 5) red cards; 6) yellow cards; 7) Public draw at the FPF headquarters.

==== Matches ====
6 May 1	Ferroviária	2–1	Santos	Araraquara
20:00	Thayslane 34' (pen.); Micaelly 48'; Dudinha Freitas (yellow card) 83'; Ana Hansen (yellow card) 90+5'	Report	(yellow card) 33' Isa Cardoso; (yellow card) 36' Vivian; 82' Analuyza	Stadium: Fonte Luminosa; Attendance: 208; Referee: Gustavo Alencar Rodrigues

14 May 2	Santos	0–0	Palmeiras	Santos
19:30	Rhay Coutinho (yellow card) 19'; Benítez (yellow card) 64'	Report	(yellow card) 34' Larissa Vasconcelos; (yellow card) 44' (yellow-red card) 70' Nath Pitbull; (yellow card) 82' Carol Baiana	Stadium: Vila Belmiro; Attendance: 826; Referee: Marianna Nanni Batalha

21 May 3	Corinthians	2–2	Santos	São Paulo
19:15	Érika 20'; Gabi Zanotti 57'	Report	17' Carol Baiana; (yellow card) 29' Ana Alice; 80' Analuyza	Stadium: Parque São Jorge; Attendance: 3,248; Referee: Leonardo Delfino de Abreu Lima

17 July 4	Santos	1–0	Taubaté	Santo André
21:00	Suzane Pires (yellow card) 42' (yellow-red card) 85'; Rafa Andrade 45+1'	Report	(yellow card) 13' Alessandra Marques; (yellow card) 61' Jissele; (yellow card) 77' Luana Marques; (yellow card) 90+1' Andresa Ferreira	Stadium: Bruno José Daniel; Attendance: 92; Referee: Fernanda dos Santos Ignacio de Souza

28 July 5	Red Bull Bragantino	1–1	Santos	Rio Claro
19:00	Del Trecco 45+2'	Report	45+4' Rincón; (yellow card) 65' Carol Baiana; (yellow card) 73' Katrine; (yellow card) 76' Nath Pitbull	Stadium: Benito Agnelo Castellano; Attendance: 82; Referee: Ana Caroline D'Eleuterio de Sousa Carvalho

13 August 6	São Paulo	1–0	Santos	Cotia
19:00	Ana Clara 74'; Isa Guimarães (yellow card) 90+6'	Report		Stadium: Marcelo Portugal Gouvêa; Attendance: 86; Referee: Edina Alves Batista

26 August 7	Santos	1–0	Mirassol	Santana de Parnaíba
18:30	Ketlen 40'	Report	(yellow card) 45+2' Katielle; (yellow card) 86' Gabi Batista; (yellow card) 90+2' Pâmela Dutra	Stadium: Gabriel Marques da Silva; Attendance: 195; Referee: Gustavo Alencar Rodrigues

==== Play-in ====
17 November First leg	Santos	v	São Paulo	São Paulo
19:00				Stadium: Pacaembu

21 November Second leg	São Paulo	v	Santos	Campinas
11:00				Stadium: Brinco de Ouro

== See also ==
- 2026 Santos FC season
