= 2026 Paulistão F =

31st season of the Paulistão F

Paulistão F
- Season: 2026
- Dates: 6 May – 20 December 2026
- Teams: 8
- Matches: 28
- Goals: 46 (1.64 per match)
- Top goalscorer: Ariel Godoi (6 goals)
- Best goalkeeper: Amanda Coimbra; Taty Amaro (3 clean sheets)
- Biggest home win: Palmeiras 5–0 Mirassol; R1, 6 May
- Biggest away win: Red Bull Bragantino 0–6 Corinthians; R2, 14 May
- Highest scoring: 8 goals Corinthians 6–2 Taubaté; R7, 26 Aug
- Longest winning run: 4 matches Ferroviária
- Longest unbeaten run: 6 matches Ferroviária; Palmeiras
- Longest winless run: 7 matches Mirassol
- Longest losing run: 4 matches Mirassol
- Highest attendance: 3,075; Corinthians 6–2 Taubaté (26 August 2026)
- Lowest attendance: 53; São Paulo 0–1 Red Bull Bragantino (21 May 2026)
- Total attendance: 7,786
- Average attendance: 278
- All statistics correct as of 25 September 2026.

The 2026 Paulista Women's Championship, officially Paulistão F Petrobras 2026, its the 31st edition of the championship, the 31st edition of the first division of the women's football in São Paulo State. The tournament is organized by the São Paulo State Football Federation (FPF). It started on 6 May and will end on 20 December 2026.

Palmeiras are the defending champions.

On 24 July, it was announced that Petrobras had acquired the naming rights to all women's football championships organized by the São Paulo State Soccer Federation. From that date through the end of 2027, the competition will be known as the Paulistão F Petrobras.

== Format ==
A new format has been announced for this edition of the Paulistão F. The competition is divided into four stages. In the first stage, the eight participating teams play each other in a single round-robin format. The top two teams automatically advance to the semifinals, while the teams ranked third through sixth qualify for a play-in to secure a spot in the semifinals. Starting with the play-in, all matches are played as two-leg series. The 2026 edition of the tournament is the first women's football competition in Brazil to use VAR in every match.

== Teams, stadiums and personnel ==
The competition will feature eight teams, all of which have been approved in accordance with the requirements set forth by the São Paulo State Football Federation's Club Licensing Committee. Mirassol is the newcomer to the tournament; its women's team was founded in 2026 in response to the requirement to field a women's team following the club's qualification for the Men's Libertadores.

Location of teams in 2026 Paulistão F

=== Stadiums and locations ===
Team	Location	Stadium	Capacity
Corinthians	São Paulo	Parque São Jorge	18,500
Corinthians	São Paulo	Neo Química Arena	47,605
Ferroviária	Araraquara	Fonte Luminosa	21,441
Mirassol	Mirassol	Maião	18,000
Mirassol	Mirassol	Manoel Francisco Ferreira (Bálsamo)	8,000
Palmeiras	São Paulo	Arena Barueri (Barueri)	31,452
Palmeiras	São Paulo	Allianz Parque	43,713
Red Bull Bragantino	Bragança Paulista	Cícero de Souza Marques	12,000
Red Bull Bragantino	Bragança Paulista	Benitão (Rio Claro)	8,136
Santos	Santos	Vila Belmiro	16,068
São Paulo	São Paulo	Marcelo Portugal Gouvêa (Cotia)	2,000
Taubaté	Taubaté	Joaquinzão	9,600

=== Personnel and sponsorship ===
Team	Head coach	Captain	Kit manufacturer	Shirt main sponsor
Corinthians	(Portugal) Emily Lima	(Brazil) Gabi Zanotti	Nike	Esporte da Sorte
Ferroviária	(Brazil) Léo Mendes	(Brazil) Nicoly	Lupo Sport	Galera.bet, Amil, Hopi Hari
Mirassol	(Brazil) Carine Bosetti	(Brazil) Katielle	Athleta	Poty
Palmeiras	(Brazil) Rosana	(Brazil) Bia Zaneratto	Puma	Sportingbet
Red Bull Bragantino	(Brazil) Humberto Simão	(Brazil) Ana Carla	Puma	Red Bull
Santos	(Brazil) Marcelo Frigerio	(Portugal) Suzane Pires	Umbro	
São Paulo	(Brazil) Thiago Viana	(Brazil) Aline Milene	New Balance	Superbet, BIS
Taubaté	(Brazil) Arismar Junior	(Brazil) Yolanda	MAGG Sports	Taubaté City Hall

== First stage ==
Pos	Team	Pld	W	D	L	GF	GA	GD	Pts	Qualification
1	Ferroviária	7	5	1	1	15	5	+10	16	Qualified to the semi-finals
2	Palmeiras	7	5	1	1	13	3	+10	16	Qualified to the semi-finals
3	Corinthians	7	4	1	2	20	8	+12	13	Qualified to the play-in
4	São Paulo	7	4	0	3	7	7	0	12	Qualified to the play-in
5	Santos	7	2	3	2	6	6	0	9	Qualified to the play-in
6	Red Bull Bragantino	7	1	4	2	5	13	−8	7	Qualified to the play-in
7	Taubaté	7	1	1	5	8	15	−7	4	Eliminated; qualified to the Copa Paulista
8	Mirassol	7	0	1	6	2	19	−17	1	Eliminated; qualified to the Copa Paulista

Updated to match(es) played on 25 September 2026. Source: FPF
Rules for classification: 1) points; 2) wins; 3) total goals difAFEence; 4) total goals scored; 5) red cards; 6) yellow cards; 7) Public draw at the FPF headquarters.

=== Results ===
Home \ Away	COR	AFE	MIR	PAL	RBB	SAN	SPA	ADT
Corinthians		1–0				2–2	1–2	6–2
Ferroviária				2–1		2–1	3–0	4–2
Mirassol	1–4	0–4			1–1			
Palmeiras	1–0		5–0		4–1		1–0	
Red Bull Bragantino	0–6	0–0				1–1		
Santos			1–0	0–0				1–0
São Paulo			2–0		0–1	1–0		2–1
Taubaté			2–0	0–1	1–1			

Updated to match(es) played on 4 August 2026. Source: FPF
Legend: Blue = home team win; Yellow = draw; Red = away team win.
For upcoming matches, an "a" indicates there is an article about the rivalry between the two participants.

== Knockout stage ==
=== Bracket ===
Play-in
3	Corinthians
6	Red Bull Bragantino
4	São Paulo
5	Santos

Semifinals
1	Ferroviária
2	Palmeiras

Finals

== Statistics ==
As of 25 September 2026.

=== Top scorers ===
Rank	Player	Club	Goals
1	(Brazil) Ariel Godoi	Corinthians	6
2	(Brazil) Jhonson	Corinthians	4

=== Assists ===
Rank	Player	Club	Assists
1	(Brazil) Gláucia	Palmeiras	1
2	(Brazil) Ana Guimarães	Palmeiras	2
2	(Brazil) Bia Zaneratto	Palmeiras	2
2	(Brazil) Duda Mineira	Corinthians	2
2	(Uruguay) Belén Aquino	Corinthians	2
2	(Colombia) Gisela Robledo	Corinthians	2
2	(Brazil) Juliete	Corinthians	2
2	(Brazil) Evelin Bonifácio	Santos	2
2	(Brazil) Camila Barbosa	São Paulo	2

=== Hat-tricks ===
Player	For	Against	Result	Date	Ref.
(Brazil) Ariel Godoi	Corinthians	Red Bull Bragantino	0–6 (A)	14 May 2026	
(Brazil) Ariel Godoi	Corinthians	Taubaté	6–2 (H)	26 August 2026	

(H) – Home; (A) – Away
