= Mayara =

Female given name

Mayara (or Maiara) is a Tupi female given name. It may also refer to:

- Maiara Barreto (born 1987), Brazilian paralympic swimmer
- Maiara Carla Henrique Pereira (born 1987), Brazilian singer-songwriter
- Maiara Walsh (born 1988), American actress and singer
- Mayara da Fonseca Bordin (born 1987), Brazilian football midfielder
- Mayara Magri (born 1962), Brazilian actress
- Mayara Magri (born 1994), Brazilian ballet dancer
- Mayara Moura (born 1986), Brazilian handball player
- Mayara Nabosne Harendt (born 2001), Brazilian football goalkeeper
- Natália Mayara (born 1994), Brazilian wheelchair tennis player
