= Rosana (footballer) =

Brazilian footballer (born 1982)

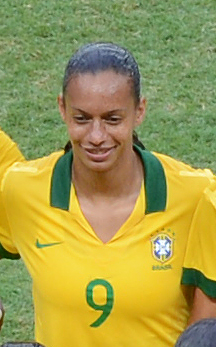
- At the 2013 Torneio Internacional de Brasília

Personal information
- Full name: Rosana dos Santos Augusto
- Date of birth: 7 July 1982 (age 44)
- Place of birth: São Paulo, São Paulo, Brazil
- Height: 1.71 m (5 ft 7 1/2 in)
- Positions: Left back; left winger

Team information
- Current team: Palmeiras (head coach)

Senior career*
Years	Team	Apps	(Gls)
1997–2000	São Paulo		
2001	Corinthians		
2002–2004	Internacional		
2004–2008	SV Neulengbach		
2009–2010	Sky Blue	41	(8)
2011	Centro Olímpico		
2011–2012	Lyon	24	(6)
2013–2014	Avaldsnes	31	(7)
2014	São José		
2015	Houston Dash	0	(0)
2015	Avaldsnes	14	(2)
2016	Paris Saint-Germain	4	(3)
2016	São José		
2017	North Carolina Courage	4	(0)
2018	Santos	15	(12)
2020	Palmeiras	14	(4)

International career
2000–2017	Brazil	112	(21)

Managerial career
- 2021: Athletico Paranaense
- 2022–2023: Red Bull Bragantino
- 2023–2025: Brazil U20
- 2025: Flamengo
- 2025–: Palmeiras
Medal record
Olympic Games
Silver medal – second place	2004 Athens	Team
Silver medal – second place	2008 Beijing	Team
Pan American Games
Gold medal – first place	2007 Rio de Janeiro	Team
Silver medal – second place	2011 Guadalajara	Team
- * Club domestic league appearances and goals

Rosana dos Santos Augusto (born 7 July 1982), commonly known as Rosana, is a Brazilian football coach and former player who played as a left back or a left winger. She is the current coach of the woman's team of Palmeiras.

Rosana played professionally for teams in Brazil, Austria, France, Norway and the United States. Since making her debut for the Brazil women's national football team in June 2000, she won over a century of caps. She has participated in four FIFA Women's World Cups and four editions of the Olympic Games.

== Club career ==
Rosana played for several years in Brazil before moving to Austria in 2004. There she played as a left winger for SV Neulengbach. In 2005–06 she was the ÖFB-Frauenliga's top goal scorer, with 26 goals.

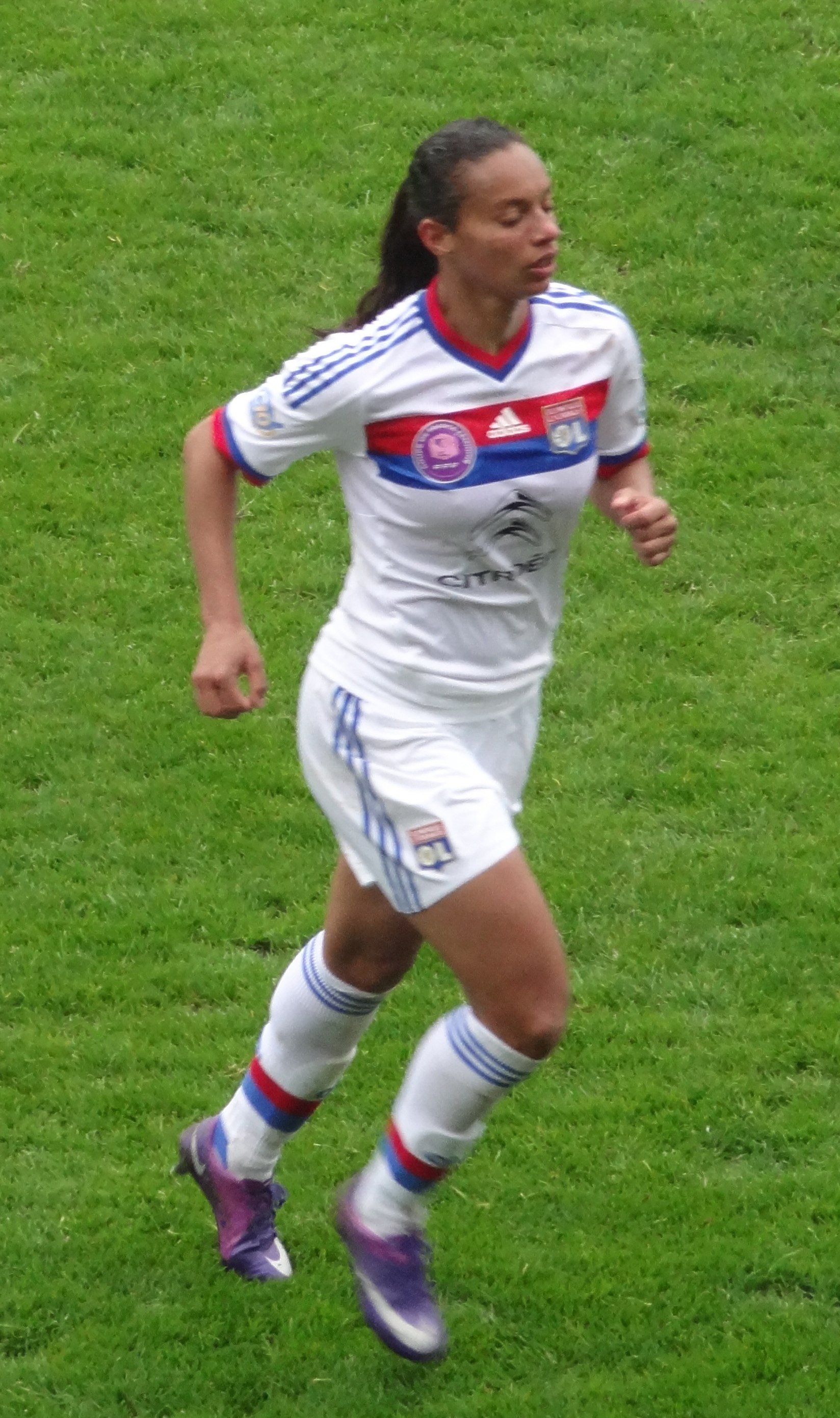
Rosana with OL

At the 2008 WPS International Draft Rosana was selected by Sky Blue FC of Women's Professional Soccer (WPS). In her first season she scored five goals from a central playmaking role. Teammate Yael Averbuch questioned Rosana's defensive capabilities: "for some reason, whenever we meet about defending, the usually quite fluent Rosana no longer speaks or understands English!"

She signed with French UEFA Women's Champions League title holders Lyon in September 2011. From February 2011 until September she had been back in Brazilian football, playing for Centro Olímpico.

In summer 2013 Rosana joined Norwegian club Avaldsnes. She recommended that the club's owners also sign her compatriot, Debinha, at the same time. In one-and-a-half seasons in Norway, Rosana and Debinha became key players, with Rosana becoming captain of the team.

Rosana played for São José in the 2014 International Women's Club Championship. She scored in the Brazilian club's 2–0 final win over English wild card entrant Arsenal Ladies. She agreed a return to the United States, with National Women's Soccer League (NWSL) team Houston Dash, in December 2014.

Before Rosana could play for Houston she was included in an 18-month residency programme intended to prepare Brazil's national team for the 2015 FIFA Women's World Cup in Canada and the 2016 Rio Olympics. She finished the 2015 season back in Norway with Avaldsnes, and scored in the Norwegian Women's Cup final, which Avaldsnes lost 3–2 to LSK Kvinner FK. In January 2016 Rosana joined French club Paris Saint-Germain. She returned to Brazilian football with São José in August 2016.

The North Carolina Courage signed Rosana on 10 January 2017, after acquiring her rights in a deal brokered by the Courage's prior organization, the Western New York Flash. She appeared in 4 matches before being waived on 21 June 2017, due to a lack of playing time with the Courage and opportunities to play elsewhere. After spending the 2018 season with Santos, Rosana announced her retirement from football.

In 2020 she came out of retirement to play for Palmeiras, before retiring again in February 2021 and joining Club Athletico Paranaense as the coach of their new women's team.

== International career ==
In June 2000 Rosana made her international debut in Brazil's 8–0 CONCACAF Women's Gold Cup win over Costa Rica at Hersheypark Stadium, Hershey, Pennsylvania. As an 18-year-old she played at the 2000 Sydney Olympics, where Brazil finished fourth after losing 2–0 to Germany in the bronze medal match at Sydney Football Stadium.

At the 2003 South American Women's Football Championship, Rosana scored Brazil's third goal in a 3–2 win over Argentina which ensured qualification for that year's FIFA Women's World Cup. At the final tournament in the United States she performed well and scored as Brazil upset Olympic champions Norway 4–1. Sweden defeated Brazil 2–1 in the quarter-final.

Rosana was a member of the national team that won the silver medal at both the 2004 and 2008 Olympic Football Tournaments. She was a substitute in the 2007 FIFA Women's World Cup Final, which Brazil lost 2–0 to Germany. At the tournament Rosana and teammates Marta, Cristiane and Daniela were nicknamed "the fantastic four".

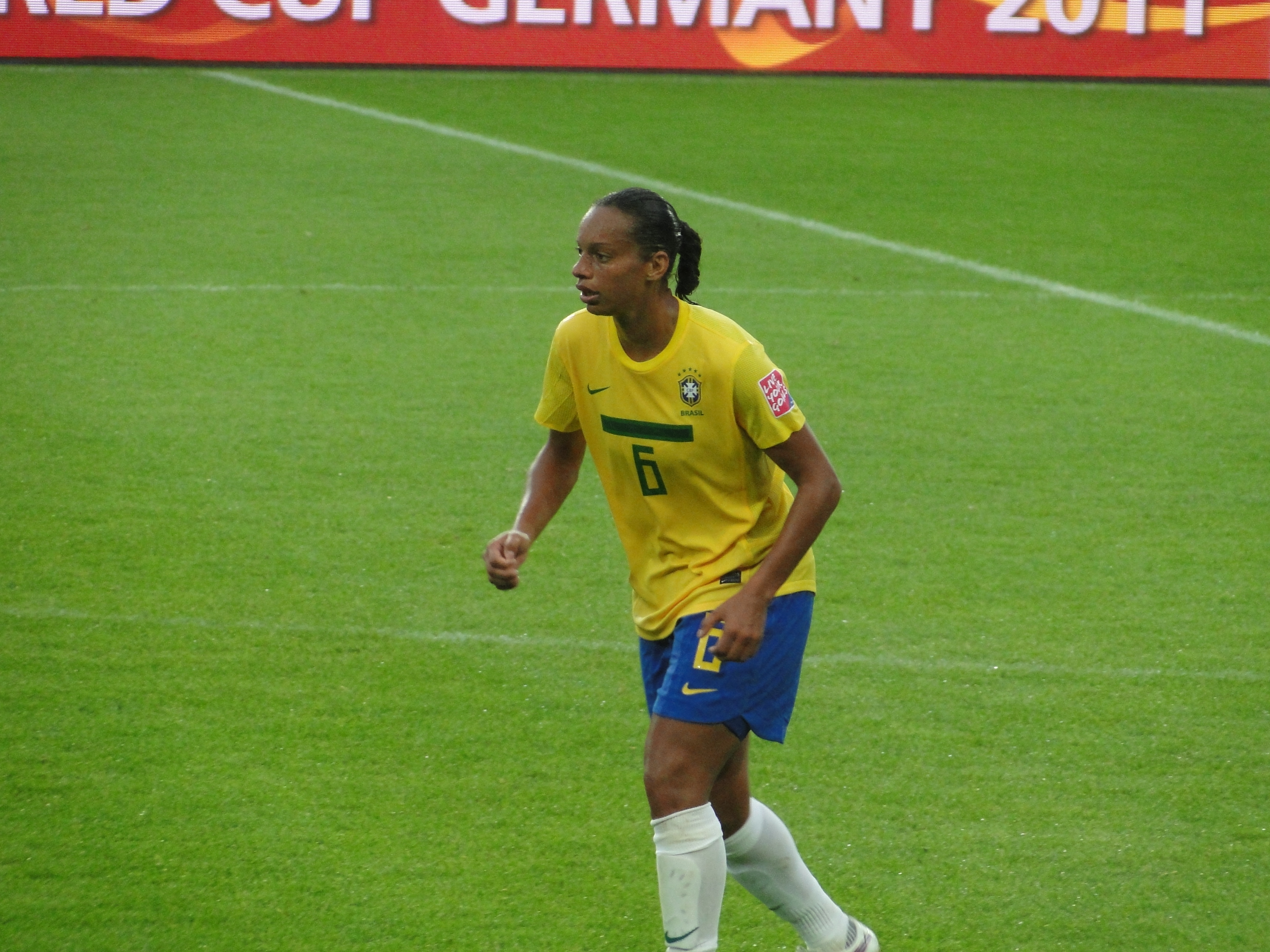
Rosana at the 2011 FIFA Women's World Cup

In Brazil's victorious 2007 Pan American Games campaign, Rosana twice scored from free kicks, against both Canada and Mexico. This led to comparisons with contemporary male footballer Ronaldinho.

At the 2011 FIFA Women's World Cup Rosana scored Brazil's goal in a 1–0 win over Australia and the second in a 3–0 win over dispirited Norway. Brazil then lost a controversial quarter-final on penalties to the United States after a 2–2 draw. Rosana had been substituted out for Francielle with five minutes of normal time remaining.

In an interview with FIFA.com ahead of the 2012 London Olympics, Rosana still regretted the manner of Brazil's World Cup defeat the previous year. At the Olympics, Rosana and Brazil lost their final group E game 1–0 to hosts Great Britain before a record crowd of 70,584 at Wembley Stadium. That meant a quarter-final against World Cup holders Japan, who eliminated Brazil by winning 2–0 at Cardiff's Millennium Stadium.

At the 2015 FIFA Women's World Cup in Canada, Rosana appeared in one of Brazil's four matches, starting the 1–0 final group game win over Costa Rica. In October 2017 Rosana was one of five Brazil players to quit international football, disgruntled at pay and conditions, and the Brazilian Football Confederation's sacking of head coach Emily Lima.

=== International goals ===
Key (expand for notes on "international goals" and sorting)
Location	Geographic location of the venue where the competition occurred Sorted by country name first, then by city name
Lineup	Start – played entire match on minute (off player) – substituted on at the minute indicated, and player was substituted off at the same time off minute (on player) – substituted off at the minute indicated, and player was substituted on at the same time (c) – captain Sorted by minutes played
#	NumberOfGoals.goalNumber scored by the player in the match (alternate notation to Goal in match)
Min	The minute in the match the goal was scored. For list that include caps, blank indicates played in the match but did not score a goal.
Assist/pass	The ball was passed by the player, which assisted in scoring the goal. This column depends on the availability and source of this information.
penalty or pk	Goal scored on penalty-kick which was awarded due to foul by opponent. (Goals scored in penalty-shoot-out, at the end of a tied match after extra-time, are not included.)
Score	The match score after the goal was scored. Sorted by goal difference, then by goal scored by the player's team
Result	The final score. Sorted by goal difference in the match, then by goal difference in penalty-shoot-out if it is taken, followed by goal scored by the player's team in the match, then by goal scored in the penalty-shoot-out. For matches with identical final scores, match ending in extra-time without penalty-shoot-out is a tougher match, therefore precede matches that ended in regulation
aet	The score at the end of extra-time; the match was tied at the end of 90' regulation
pso	Penalty-shoot-out score shown in parentheses; the match was tied at the end of extra-time
	Green background color – exhibition or closed door international friendly match
	Yellow background color – match at an invitational tournament
	Red background color – Olympic women's football qualification match
	Light-blue background color – FIFA women's world cup qualification match
	Pink background color – Olympic women's football tournament
	Blue background color – FIFA women's world cup final tournament
NOTE: some keys may not apply for a particular football player

Goal	Date	Location	Opponent	#	Score	Result	Competition
goal 1	2001-08-07	Suwon, South Korea	Japan	1.1	1–0	1–1	Four Nations Cup
goal 2	2003-04-23	Lima, Peru	Argentina	1.1	3–1	3–2	Copa América 2003
goal 3	2003-09-23	Washington, United States	Norway	1.1	2–1	4–1	2003 FIFA Women's World Cup
goal 4	2007-07-12	Rio de Janeiro, Brazil	Uruguay	1.1	3–0	4–0	2007 Pan American Games
goal 5	2007-07-20	Rio de Janeiro, Brazil	Canada	1.1	2–0	7–0	2007 Pan American Games
goal 6	2007-07-23	Rio de Janeiro, Brazil	Mexico	2.1	1–0	2–0	2007 Pan American Games
goal 7	2007-07-23	Rio de Janeiro, Brazil	Mexico	2.2	2–0	2–0	2007 Pan American Games
goal 8	2008-04-19	Beijing, China	Ghana	1.1	5–0	5–1	Inter-continental play-off
goal 9	2010-10-24	Rio de Janeiro, Brazil	Haiti	1.1	7–0	7–0	Friendly match
goal 10	2010-11-17	Latacunga, Ecuador	Argentina	1.1	2–0	4–0	Copa América 2010
goal 11	2011-05-14	Maceio, Brazil	Chile	1.1	3–0	3–0	Friendly match
goal 12	2011-06-29	Mönchengladbach, Germany	Australia	1.1	1–0	1–0	2011 FIFA Women's World Cup
goal 13	2011-07-03	Wolfsburg, Germany	Norway	1.1	2–0	3–0	2011 FIFA Women's World Cup
goal 14	2011-12-14	São Paulo, Brazil	Chile	1.1	2–0	4–0	Torneio Internacional 2011
goal 15	2011-12-14	Chatel-St-Denis, Switzerland	Colombia	1.1	1–0	2–1	Matchworld Women's Cup 2012
goal 16	2012-12-13	São Paulo, Brazil	Mexico	1.1	1–0	1–2	Torneio Internacional 2012
goal 17	2013-11-10	Orlando, United States	United States	1.1	1–2	1–4	Friendly match

== Personal life ==
Rosana was both Minas Gerais state and national champion in kung fu.

== Honours ==
=== Player ===
SV Neulengbach

- ÖFB Frauen Bundesliga: 2004–05, 2005–06, 2006–07, 2007–08
- ÖFB Frauen Cup: 2004–05, 2005–06, 2006–07, 2007–08

Sky Blue FC

- Women's Professional Soccer: 2009

Lyon

- UEFA Women's Champions League: 2011–12

São José

- Copa Libertadores Femenina: 2014

Corinthians/Audax

- Copa Libertadores Femenina: 2017

Santos

- Campeonato Paulista de Futebol Feminino: 2018

Brazil

- Pan American Games: 2007
- Olympic Games Silver Medal: 2004, 2008
- South American Women's Football Championship: 2010

Individual

- Campeonato Paulista de Futebol Feminino Team of the Year: 2018

=== Coach ===
Athletico Paranaense

- Campeonato Paranaense de Futebol Feminino: 2021

Red Bull Bragantino

- Campeonato Brasileiro de Futebol Feminino Série A2: 2023

Flamengo

- Campeonato Carioca de Futebol Feminino: 2025
- Copa Rio de Futebol Feminino: 2025

Palmeiras

- Campeonato Paulista de Futebol Feminino: 2025
- Copa do Brasil de Futebol Feminino: 2025
- Supercopa do Brasil de Futebol Feminino: 2026

Brazil U20

- South American Under-20 Women's Championship: 2024

Individual

- Campeonato Paulista de Futebol Feminino Best Head Coach: 2025

== See also ==
- List of women's footballers with 100 or more international caps
