= Isa Cardoso =

Brazilian footballer

Personal information
- Full name: Isabela Martins Cardoso
- Date of birth: 11 December 1997 (age 28)
- Place of birth: Campinas, Brazil
- Height: 1.67 m (5 ft 6 in)
- Position: Centre-back

Team information
- Current team: Santos
- Number: 6

College career
| Years | Team | Apps | (Gls) |
| 2017–2018 | FNU Conquistadors | 26 | (8) |
| 2019–2021 | Northern Michigan Wildcats | 23 | (10) |

Senior career*
| Years | Team | Apps | (Gls) |
| 2023–2024 | Athletico Paranaense | 20 | (7) |
| 2025 | Nacional Montevideo | 14 | (1) |
| 2026– | Santos | 0 | (0) |
- * Club domestic league appearances and goals as of 17:17, 20 January 2026 (UTC)

Isabela Martins Cardoso (born 11 December 1997), known as Isa Cardoso, is a Brazilian professional footballer who plays for Santos. Mainly a centre-back, she has also played as a forward.

== Career ==
Born in Campinas, São Paulo, Isa Cardoso played for football schools in her hometown before moving to the United States at the age of 18, joining Florida National University's FNU Conquistadors. In 2019, she moved to the Northern Michigan University, and played for their women's soccer side Northern Michigan Wildcats.

In 2023, Isa Cardoso returned to her home country to join Athletico Paranaense, and helped the side to win the year's Campeonato Paranaense by being the club's top scorer. In the following year, she moved from the forward position to a centre-back spot at the same club.

On 7 March 2025, Nacional Montevideo announced the signing of Isa Cardoso on a one-year contract. On 19 January of the following year, she was announced at Santos back in her home country, also on a one-year deal.

== Career statistics ==
As of 24 December 2025

Appearances and goals by club, season and competition
| Club | Season | League | | | State league | | Cup | | Continental | | Other | | Total | |
| Club | Season | Division | Apps | Goals | Apps | Goals | Apps | Goals | Apps | Goals | Apps | Goals | Apps | Goals |
|---|---|---|---|---|---|---|---|---|---|---|---|---|---|---|
| Athletico Paranaense | 2023 | Série A1 | 4 | 0 | 6 | 7 | — | | — | | — | | 10 | 7 |
| Athletico Paranaense | 2024 | Série A2 | 8 | 0 | 2 | 0 | — | | — | | — | | 10 | 0 |
| Athletico Paranaense | Total | | 12 | 0 | 8 | 7 | — | | — | | — | | 20 | 7 |
| Nacional Montevideo | 2025 | Campeonato Uruguayo | 14 | 1 | — | | — | | 3 (Note: Appearance(s) in Copa Libertadores Femenina) | 0 | — | | 17 | 1 |
| Santos | 2026 | Série A1 | 0 | 0 | 0 | 0 | 0 | 0 | — | | — | | 0 | 0 |
| Career total | | | 136 | 11 | 151 | 23 | 11 | 2 | 19 | 1 | 1 | 0 | 318 | 37 |

== Honours ==
Athletico Paranaense

- Campeonato Paranaense de Futebol Feminino: 2023, 2024

Nacional Montevideo

- Campeonato Uruguayo Femenino: 2025
