= Ana Alice =

Brazilian footballer (born 1989)

Personal information
- Full name: Ana Alice Luciano da Silva
- Date of birth: 14 March 1989 (age 37)
- Place of birth: Porto Firme, Brazil
- Height: 1.75 m (5 ft 9 in)
- Position: Centre-back

Team information
- Current team: Santos
- Number: 4

Senior career*
Years	Team	Apps	(Gls)
2008	Atlético Mineiro		
2009	Juventus-SP		
2010	Botucatu		
2011	ABD Botucatu	4	(0)
2012–2016	Rio Preto	111	(14)
2016–2017	Kiryat Gat		
2017	Rio Preto	16	(2)
2017–2018	Kiryat Gat	21	(4)
2018–2019	Benfica	14	(8)
2019–2020	Grêmio	26	(4)
2021–2022	Ferroviária	49	(7)
2023–2024	São Paulo	52	(6)
2025–	Santos	25	(3)
- * Club domestic league appearances and goals as of 18:21, 3 December 2025 (UTC)

Ana Alice Luciano da Silva (born 14 March 1989), known as Ana Alice, is a Brazilian professional footballer who plays as a centre-back for Santos.

== Career ==
Ana Alice was born in Porto Firme, Minas Gerais, and began her career with Atlético Mineiro in 2008. After playing for Juventus-SP, Botucatu and ABD Botucatu, she became a mainstay at Rio Preto, helping the club to win the club's first ever Campeonato Brasileiro title in 2015.

Ana Alice moved to Israel in 2017, signing for Kiryat Gat and winning two consecutive Ligat Nashim titles. On 23 March 2018, she was announced at Benfica.

On 13 September 2019, Ana Alice returned to Brazil after joining Grêmio. On 14 January 2021, she moved to Ferroviária, and helped the side to win the 2020 Copa Libertadores Femenina.

On 19 January 2023, Ana Alice agreed to a one-year contract with São Paulo. On 9 January 2025, she joined Santos on a one-year deal.

== Career statistics ==
As of 3 December 2025

Appearances and goals by club, season and competition
Club	Season	League			State league		Cup		Continental		Other		Total	
Club	Season	Division	Apps	Goals	Apps	Goals	Apps	Goals	Apps	Goals	Apps	Goals	Apps	Goals
ABD Botucatu	2011	Paulista	—		4	0	—		—		—		4	0
Rio Preto	2012	Série A1	0	0	12	1	—		—		—		12	1
Rio Preto	2013	Série A1	12	1	16	3	—		—		—		28	4
Rio Preto	2014	Paulista	—		13	0	3	1	—		—		16	1
Rio Preto	2015	Série A1	14	2	13	6	—		—		—		27	8
Rio Preto	2016	Série A1	14	1	17	0	—		—		—		31	1
Rio Preto	2017	Série A1	4	0	12	2	—		—		—		16	2
Rio Preto	Total		44	4	83	12	3	1	—		—		130	17
Benfica	2018–19	Campeonato Nacional II Divisão	14	8	—		2	2	—		—		16	10
Grêmio	2019	Série A1	—		7	4	—		—		—		7	4
Grêmio	2020	Série A1	16	0	3	0	—		—		—		19	0
Grêmio	Total		16	0	10	4	—		—		—		26	4
Ferroviária	2020	Série A1	—		—		—		5 (Note: Appearance(s) in Copa Libertadores Femenina)	3	—		5	3
Ferroviária	2021	Série A1	18	2	10	2	—		6	0	—		34	4
Ferroviária	2022	Série A1	10	0	11	3	—		4	0	—		25	3
Ferroviária	Total		28	2	21	5	—		15	3	—		64	10
São Paulo	2023	Série A1	13	1	14	3	—		—		—		27	4
São Paulo	2024	Série A1	16	1	9	1	—		—		—		25	2
São Paulo	Total		29	2	23	4	—		—		—		52	6
Santos	2025	Série A2	11	1	14	2	2	0	—		1 (Note: Appearance(s) in Copa Paulista de Futebol Feminino)	1	28	4
Career total			142	17	155	27	5	3	15	3	1	1	328	51

== Honours ==
Rio Preto

- Campeonato Brasileiro de Futebol Feminino Série A1: 2015
- Campeonato Paulista de Futebol Feminino: 2016

Kiryat Gat

- Ligat Nashim: 2016–17, 2017–18

Benfica

- Campeonato Nacional II Divisão Feminino: 2018–19
- Taça de Portugal Feminina: 2018–19

Ferroviária

- Copa Libertadores Femenina: 2020

Santos

- Campeonato Brasileiro de Futebol Feminino Série A2: 2025
