= Ana Barboza =

Brazilian footballer (born 2006)

Personal information
- Full name: Ana Clara Vieira Barboza
- Date of birth: 30 April 2005 (age 21)
- Place of birth: Angra dos Reis, Brazil
- Position: Winger

Team information
- Current team: Santos
- Number: 30

Youth career
- 2020–2021: Vasco da Gama
- 2021–2024: Santos

Senior career*
Years	Team	Apps	(Gls)
2020–2021	Vasco da Gama	1	(0)
2025–	Santos	4	(0)
- * Club domestic league appearances and goals as of 17:20, 26 August 2026 (UTC)

Ana Clara Vieira Barboza (born 30 April 2005), known as Ana Barboza, is a Brazilian footballer who plays as a winger for Santos.

== Career ==
Born in Angra dos Reis, Rio de Janeiro, Ana Barboza began her career with Vasco da Gama, and made a first team appearance for the side in 2020, aged 15. In June 2021, she left the club and moved to Santos, being initially a member of the under-16 team.

On 30 January 2025, Ana Barboza renewed her contract with the Sereias da Vila until December, being promoted to the first team. She made three appearances for the main squad before suffering a knee injury in May which sidelined her for the remainder of the year.

Ana Barboza only returned from injury in July 2026, and returned to action in the following month, after more than 400 days without playing.

== Career statistics ==
As of 25 August 2026

Appearances and goals by club, season and competition
Club	Season	League			State league		Cup		Continental		Other		Total	
Club	Season	Division	Apps	Goals	Apps	Goals	Apps	Goals	Apps	Goals	Apps	Goals	Apps	Goals
Vasco da Gama	2020	Série A2	1	0	0	0	—		—		—		1	0
Santos	2025	Série A2	1	0	2	0	0	0	—		—		3	0
Santos	2026	Série A1	1	0	0	0	0	0	—		—		1	0
Santos	Total		2	0	2	0	0	0	—		—		4	0
Career total			3	0	2	0	0	0	0	0	0	0	5	0
