= Evellyn Marques =

Brazilian footballer

Personal information
- Full name: Evellyn Tauane Martins Marques
- Date of birth: 14 May 1998 (age 28)
- Place of birth: Rio de Janeiro, Brazil
- Height: 1.65 m (5 ft 5 in)
- Position: Right-back

Team information
- Current team: Santos
- Number: 22

Youth career
- Padre Miguel
- Cabo Frio
- 2017: Taubaté

Senior career*
| Years | Team | Apps | (Gls) |
| 2018–2019 | Taubaté | 32 | (1) |
| 2019 | Real Ariquemes | 4 | (0) |
| 2020 | Cruzeiro | 4 | (0) |
| 2021–2022 | São José | 40 | (0) |
| 2023–2024 | Athletico Paranaense | 29 | (0) |
| 2025– | Santos | 21 | (0) |
- * Club domestic league appearances and goals as of 20:20, 29 December 2025 (UTC)

Evellyn Tauane Martins Marques (born 14 May 1998), known as Evellyn Marques or just Evellyn, is a Brazilian professional footballer who plays as a right-back for Santos.

== Career ==
Born in Rio de Janeiro, Evellyn played for local amateur sides Padre Miguel and Cabo Frio before joining AD Taubaté in 2017. On 6 January 2020, after a short period at Real Ariquemes, she was announced at Cruzeiro.

On 3 February 2021, after being rarely used, Evellyn joined São José. On 23 January 2023, she was announced at Athletico Paranaense.

On 16 January 2025, Evellyn signed a one-year contract with Santos.

== Career statistics ==
As of 29 December 2025

Appearances and goals by club, season and competition
| Club | Season | League | | | State league | | Cup | | Continental | | Other | | Total | |
| Club | Season | Division | Apps | Goals | Apps | Goals | Apps | Goals | Apps | Goals | Apps | Goals | Apps | Goals |
|---|---|---|---|---|---|---|---|---|---|---|---|---|---|---|
| Taubaté | 2018 | Paulista | — | | 18 | 1 | — | | — | | — | | 18 | 1 |
| Taubaté | 2019 | Série A2 | 7 | 0 | 7 | 0 | — | | — | | — | | 14 | 0 |
| Taubaté | Total | | 7 | 0 | 25 | 1 | — | | — | | — | | 32 | 1 |
| Real Ariquemes | 2019 | Rondoniense | — | | 4 | 0 | — | | — | | — | | 4 | 0 |
| Cruzeiro | 2020 | Série A1 | 2 | 0 | 2 | 0 | — | | — | | — | | 4 | 0 |
| São José | 2021 | Série A1 | 14 | 0 | 9 | 0 | — | | — | | 4 (Note: Appearance(s) in Copa Paulista de Futebol Feminino) | 0 | 27 | 0 |
| São José | 2022 | Série A1 | 12 | 0 | 5 | 0 | — | | — | | — | | 17 | 0 |
| São José | Total | | 26 | 0 | 14 | 0 | — | | — | | 4 | 0 | 44 | 0 |
| Athletico Paranaense | 2023 | Série A1 | 12 | 0 | 5 | 0 | — | | — | | 1 (Note: Appearance(s) in Supercopa do Brasil de Futebol Feminino) | 0 | 18 | 0 |
| Athletico Paranaense | 2024 | Série A2 | 9 | 0 | 3 | 0 | — | | — | | — | | 12 | 0 |
| Athletico Paranaense | Total | | 21 | 0 | 8 | 0 | — | | — | | 1 | 0 | 30 | 0 |
| Santos | 2025 | Série A2 | 9 | 0 | 12 | 0 | 1 | 0 | — | | 3 | 0 | 25 | 0 |
| Career total | | | 65 | 0 | 65 | 1 | 1 | 0 | 0 | 0 | 8 | 0 | 139 | 1 |

== Honours ==
Athletico Paranaense

- Campeonato Paranaense de Futebol Feminino: 2023, 2024

Santos

- Campeonato Brasileiro de Futebol Feminino Série A2: 2025
