= Vivian (footballer) =

Brazilian footballer

Personal information
- Full name: Vivian Cardoso dos Santos
- Date of birth: 21 April 1997 (age 29)
- Place of birth: Osasco, Brazil
- Position: Attacking midfielder

Team information
- Current team: Santos
- Number: 25

Senior career*
Years	Team	Apps	(Gls)
2015	São Bernardo	6	(1)
2016–2019	Juventus-SP	47	(4)
2020–2021	Botafogo FR	50	(18)
2022	Minas Brasília	14	(1)
2023–2025	São Paulo	37	(4)
2025	→ Red Bull Bragantino (loan)	25	(0)
2026–	Santos	0	(0)
- * Club domestic league appearances and goals as of 18:44, 19 January 2026 (UTC)

Vivian Cardoso dos Santos (born 21 April 1997), simply known as Vivian, is a Brazilian professional footballer who plays as an attacking midfielder for Santos.

== Career ==
Born in Osasco, São Paulo, Vivian began her career playing with men in a local school, aged nine. She moved to another school at the age of 13, before making her professional debut with São Bernardo in 2015, aged 18, as the club had a partnership with the university she was studying at.

In 2016, Vivian signed for Juventus-SP, where she was regularly used before joining Botafogo FR in 2020. On 5 January 2022, she left the latter and moved to Minas Brasília.

On 23 January 2023, Vivian was announced at São Paulo on a one-year contract. She renewed her link for two further years on 3 January 2024, but moved on loan to Red Bull Bragantino on 14 January 2025.

On 16 January 2026, Santos announced the signing of Vivian on a one-year deal.

== Career statistics ==
As of 19 January 2026

Appearances and goals by club, season and competition
Club	Season	League			State league		Cup		Continental		Other		Total	
Club	Season	Division	Apps	Goals	Apps	Goals	Apps	Goals	Apps	Goals	Apps	Goals	Apps	Goals
São Bernardo	2015	Série A1	—		6	1	—		—		—		6	1
Juventus-SP	2016	Paulista	—		7	2	—		—		—		7	2
Juventus-SP	2017	Paulista	—		13	1	—		—		—		13	1
Juventus-SP	2018	Paulista	—		12	0	—		—		—		12	0
Juventus-SP	2019	Paulista	—		15	1	—		—		0	0	15	1
Juventus-SP	Total		—		47	4	—		—		0	0	47	4
Botafogo	2020	Série A1	12	3	9	7	—		—		—		21	10
Botafogo	2021	Série A1	14	0	15	8	—		—		—		29	8
Botafogo	Total		26	3	24	15	—		—		—		50	18
Minas Brasília	2022	Série A1	13	1	1	0	—		—		1 (Note: Appearance(s) in Supercopa do Brasil de Futebol Feminino)	0	15	1
São Paulo	2023	Série A1	13	2	11	2	—		—		—		24	4
São Paulo	2024	Série A1	9	0	4	0	—		—		—		13	0
São Paulo	Total		22	2	15	2	—		—		—		37	4
Red Bull Bragantino (loan)	2025	Série A1	15	0	10	0	2	1	—		3 (Note: Appearance(s) in Copa Paulista de Futebol Feminino)	1	30	2
Santos	2026	Série A1	0	0	0	0	0	0	—		—		0	0
Career total			77	6	103	22	2	1	0	0	4	1	186	30

== Honours ==
Botafogo

- Campeonato Carioca de Futebol Feminino: 2020

Red Bull Bragantino

- Copa Paulista de Futebol Feminino: 2025
