= Anna Cury =

Brazilian footballer (born 2006)

Personal information
- Full name: Anna Julia Lopes Cury
- Date of birth: 5 February 2006 (age 20)
- Place of birth: Ituiutaba, Brazil
- Position: Winger

Team information
- Current team: Santos
- Number: 34

Youth career
- 2021: São Paulo
- 2021: Fluminense
- 2022–: Santos

Senior career*
Years	Team	Apps	(Gls)
2025–	Santos	8	(2)
- * Club domestic league appearances and goals as of 04:59, 16 August 2026 (UTC)

Anna Julia Lopes Cury (born 5 February 2006) is a Brazilian footballer who plays as a winger for Santos.

== Club career ==
Born in Ituiutaba, Minas Gerais, Cury joined Santos' youth categories in 2022, after playing for Fluminense and São Paulo. She made her first team debut with the club on 3 August 2025, coming on as a late substitute for Laryh in a 1–1 Campeonato Paulista home draw against Realidade Jovem.

On 20 December 2025, Cury signed her first professional contract with the Sereias, agreeing to a three-year deal. The following 2 August, she scored her first senior goal, netting his side's fourth in a 4–0 Campeonato Brasileiro de Futebol Feminino Série A1 home routing of Juventude.

== International career ==
On 9 October 2025, Cury and Santos teammate Samara were called up to the Brazil national under-20 team.

== Career statistics ==
As of 22 April 2026

Appearances and goals by club, season and competition
Club	Season	League			State league		Cup		Continental		Other		Total	
Club	Season	Division	Apps	Goals	Apps	Goals	Apps	Goals	Apps	Goals	Apps	Goals	Apps	Goals
Santos	2025	Série A2	0	0	2	0	0	0	—		1 (Note: Appearance(s) in Copa Paulista de Futebol Feminino)	0	3	0
Santos	2026	Série A1	1	1	0	0	1	0	—		—		2	1
Career total			1	1	2	0	1	0	0	0	1	0	5	1
