= Katrine (footballer) =

Brazilian footballer (born 1998)

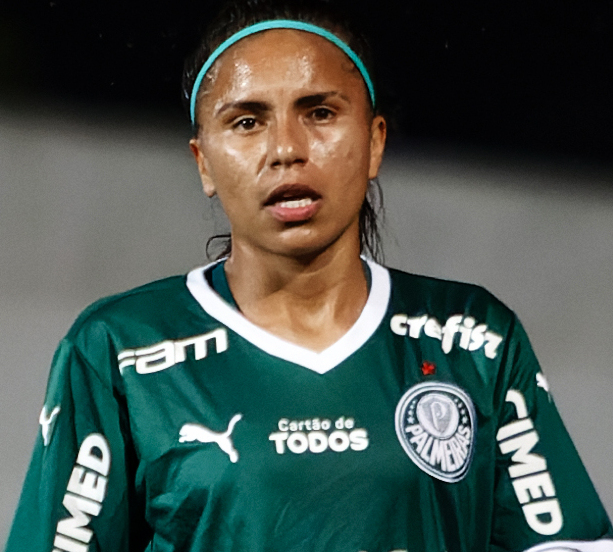
- Katrine playing for Palmeiras in 2021

Personal information
- Full name: Katrine da Silva Costa
- Date of birth: 19 April 1998 (age 28)
- Place of birth: Fortaleza, Brazil
- Height: 1.57 m (5 ft 2 in)
- Positions: Left-back; midfielder

Team information
- Current team: Santos
- Number: 97

Youth career
- Menina Olímpica
- 2014–2015: Unifor Futsal
- 2016: Audax/Corinthians

Senior career*
Years	Team	Apps	(Gls)
2017	Audax/Corinthians	4	(0)
2018	Audax	18	(1)
2018	Internacional	6	(3)
2019	Grêmio	20	(8)
2020	Minas Brasília	23	(5)
2021–2023	Palmeiras	89	(4)
2024–2025	Internacional	46	(2)
2026–	Santos	0	(0)

International career^{‡}
2015–2018	Brazil U20	16	(1)
2021	Brazil	3	(0)
- * Club domestic league appearances and goals as of 22:17, 14 January 2026 (UTC) ‡ National team caps and goals as of 1 December 2021

Katrine da Silva Costa (born 19 April 1998), simply known as Katrine, is a Brazilian professional footballer who plays as a left-back and midfielder for Série A1 club Santos.

== Club career ==
Born in Fortaleza, Ceará, Katrine began her career with local side Menina Olímpica, before moving to Itapejara d'Oeste in 2012. Back to her hometown in 2014, she played for Unifor Futsal before signing for Corinthians in 2016.

Initially under a partnership with Audax, Katrine remained at Audax during the 2018, before agreeing to a deal with Ceará in August of that year. The deal later collapsed, and she moved to Internacional instead.

On 21 January 2019, Katrine was announced at Grêmio. She then spent a year at Minas Brasília, before joining Palmeiras on 20 January 2021.

On 8 December 2023, Katrine returned to Inter on a two-year deal. On 13 January 2026, Santos announced her signing on a two-year contract.

== International career ==
Katrine represented Brazil at two FIFA U-20 Women's World Cup editions (2016 and 2018). She made her debut with the full side on 17 September 2021, in a friendly against Argentine which Brazil won 3–1.

== Career statistics ==
=== Club ===
As of 14 January 2026

Appearances and goals by club, season and competition
Club	Season	League			State league		Cup		Continental		Other		Total	
Club	Season	Division	Apps	Goals	Apps	Goals	Apps	Goals	Apps	Goals	Apps	Goals	Apps	Goals
Corinthians	2017	Série A1	3	0	1	0	—		—		—		4	0
Audax	2018	Série A1	10	0	8	1	—		—		—		18	1
Internacional	2018	Série A2	—		6	3	—		—		—		6	3
Grêmio	2019	Série A2	11	3	9	5	—		—		—		20	8
Minas Brasília	2020	Série A1	15	4	8	1	—		—		—		23	5
Palmeiras	2021	Série A1	21	1	11	2	—		—		4 (Note: Appearance(s) in Copa Paulista de Futebol Feminino)	0	36	3
Palmeiras	2022	Série A1	17	0	13	0	—		6 (Note: Appearance(s) in Copa Libertadores Femenina)	1	1 (Note: Appearance(s) in Supercopa do Brasil de Futebol Feminino)	0	37	1
Palmeiras	2023	Série A1	15	0	12	1	—		5	3	—		32	4
Palmeiras	Total		53	1	36	3	—		11	4	5	0	105	8
Internacional	2024	Série A1	16	1	8	0	—		—		1	0	25	1
Internacional	2025	Série A1	13	0	9	0	3	1	—		—		25	1
Internacional	Total		29	1	17	0	3	1	—		1	0	50	2
Santos	2026	Série A1	0	0	0	0	0	0	—		—		0	0
Career total			121	9	85	13	3	1	11	4	6	0	226	27

=== International ===
As of 13 January 2026

National team	Year	Apps	Goals
Brazil	2021	3	0
Total		3	0

== Honours ==
Audax/Corinthians

- Copa Libertadores Femenina: 2017

Palmeiras

- Copa Paulista de Futebol Feminino: 2021
- Campeonato Paulista de Futebol Feminino: 2022
- Copa Libertadores Femenina: 2022

Brazil U20

- South American U-20 Women's Championship: 2015
