= Mariana Larroquette =

Argentine footballer (born 1992)

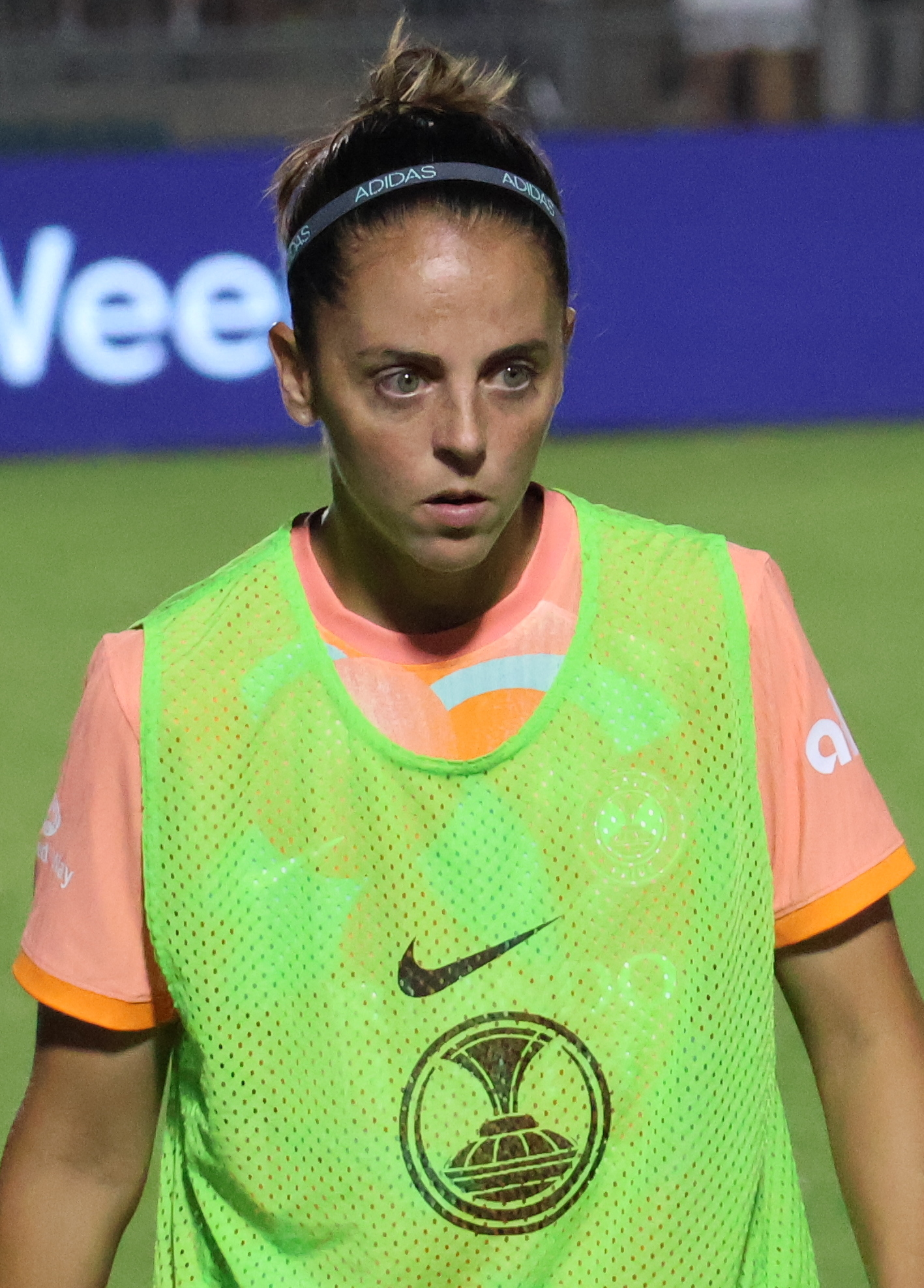
- Larroquette with the Orlando Pride in 2024

Personal information
- Full name: Mariana Valeria Larroquette
- Date of birth: 24 October 1992 (age 34)
- Place of birth: Ituzaingó, Buenos Aires, Argentina
- Height: 1.66 m (5 ft 5 in)
- Position: Forward

Team information
- Current team: Santos
- Number: 19

Senior career*
| Years | Team | Apps | (Gls) |
| 2010–2015 | River Plate | 106 | (208) |
| 2016–2017 | Universidad de Chile | 33 | (50) |
| 2017–2020 | UAI Urquiza | 46 | (74) |
| 2020 | Lyn | 3 | (0) |
| 2021 | Kansas City | 19 | (2) |
| 2021–2022 | Sporting CP | 8 | (3) |
| 2022–2023 | León | 26 | (9) |
| 2023–2025 | Orlando Pride | 9 | (1) |
| 2025 | → Newell's Old Boys (loan) | 6 | (7) |
| 2025 | → Lexington SC (loan) | 0 | (0) |
| 2026– | Santos | 20 | (3) |

International career^{‡}
| 2008–2012 | Argentina U20 | 6 | (0) |
| 2014– | Argentina | 83 | (21) |
Medal record
Women's football
Representing Argentina
Copa América Femenina
| Third place | 2018 Chile |
| Third place | 2022 Colombia |
Pan American Games
| Silver medal – second place | 2019 Lima | Team |
South American Games
| Gold medal – first place | 2014 Santiago | Team |
- * Club domestic league appearances and goals as of 5 December 2025 ‡ National team caps and goals as of 1 August 2025

Mariana Valeria Larroquette (born 24 October 1992) is an Argentine professional footballer who plays as a forward for Brazilian club Santos and the Argentina national team.

== Club career ==
=== Early career ===
Larroquette began her career with River Plate, being a prolific goalscorer for the side as they won the 2010 Clausura tournament. In 2016, she moved abroad and joined Chilean side Universidad de Chile, and scored six times on her debut against Deportes La Serena.

Larroquette was one of the key units of La U during their 2016 Apertura title, scoring 21 goals in the tournament. In the following year, however, she returned to her home country and signed for UAI Urquiza. She won two consecutive titles with the club (in the 2017–18 and 2018–19 seasons), being the top scorer in the first campaign with 45 goals.

=== Lyn ===
In August 2020, Larroquette moved to Lyn Fotball Damer in Norway, becoming the first Argentine to play in the Toppserien. She was only rarely used at his new side, playing in just four matches.

=== Kansas City ===
On 22 December 2020, Larroquette was announced as the first international addition of National Women's Soccer League side Kansas City. Despite playing 21 matches, she only started nine of them, scoring twice. On 21 December 2021, the club announced her departure.

=== Sporting CP ===
On 6 January 2022, Larroquette switched teams and countries again, after being announced at Sporting CP in Portugal on a six-month deal. Despite being regularly used, she left on 9 June.

=== León ===
On 11 July 2022, Larroquette moved to Mexico and joined Liga MX Femenil side León. She departed the club after nine goals in 26 official matches on 1 July 2023.

=== Orlando Pride ===
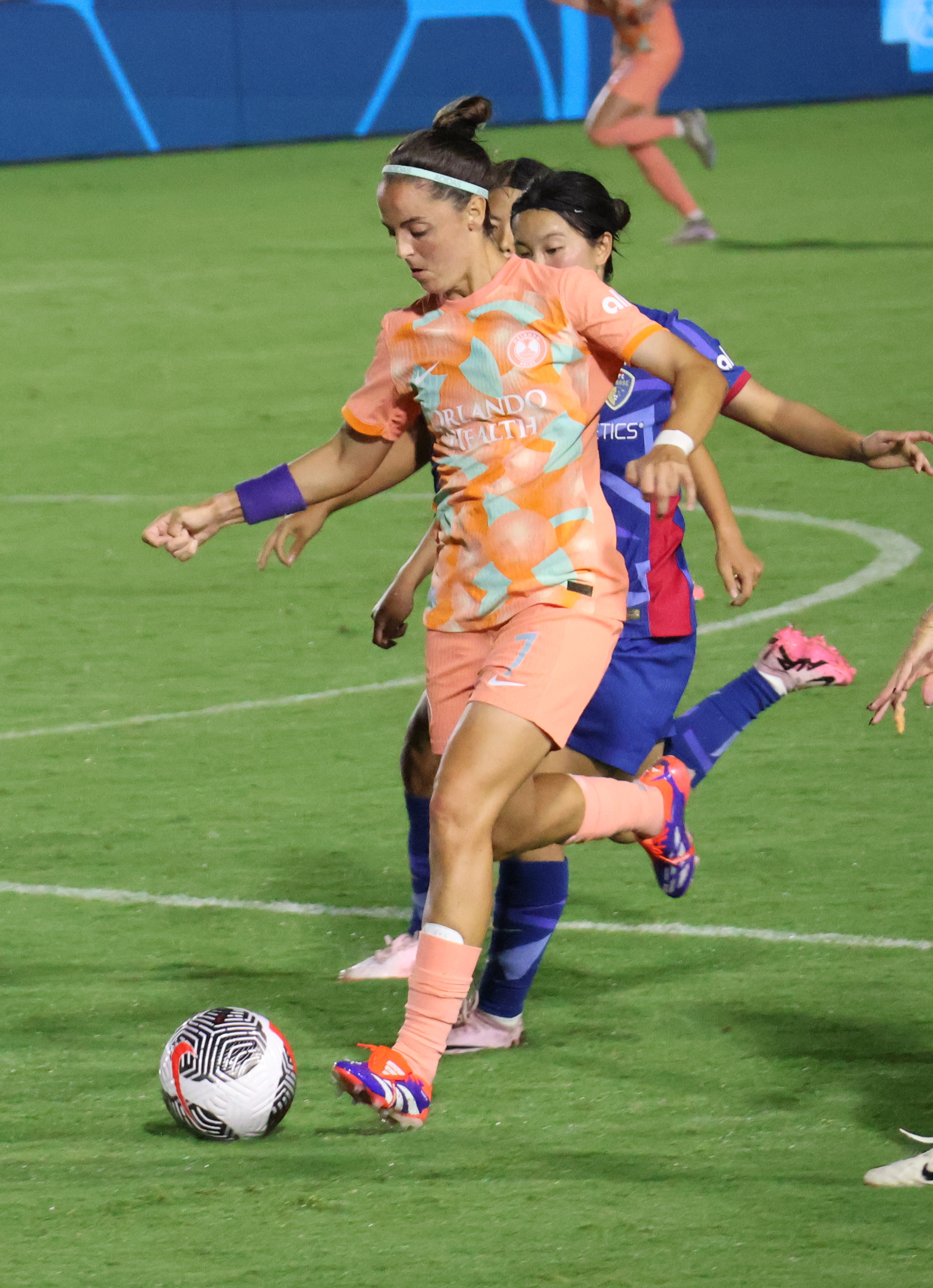
Larroquette playing for Orlando Pride in 2024

On 6 July 2023, it was announced Larroquette had signed a two-and-a-half-year contract with Orlando Pride of the National Women's Soccer League, joining the team following the conclusion of the 2023 FIFA Women's World Cup. In January 2024, Larroquette acquired a U.S. green card meaning she would no longer occupy an international roster spot.

In January 2025, Larroquette returned to Argentina on a six-month loan to Newell's Old Boys. After the loan expired, Larroquette was sent out once again, this time on a loan to Lexington SC lasting from July to the end of the 2025 NWSL season. She did not make an appearance for Lexington before her loan concluded in December 2025.

=== Santos ===
On 21 January 2026, Larroquette moved to Brazil and signed a two-year contract with Santos.

== International career ==
Larroquette represented Argentina at the 2008 FIFA U-20 Women's World Cup and the 2012 FIFA U-20 Women's World Cup. At senior level, she played at two Copa América Femenina editions (2014 and 2018), scoring three goals at the first and two at the latter, as well as the 2015 Pan American Games and the 2019 FIFA Women's World Cup. (Note: 2015 Pan American Games matches are not recognised by FIFA.) She also represented Argentina at the 2023 FIFA Women's World Cup, starting all 3 of the team's matches at striker.

== Personal life ==
Larroquette is a supporter of Racing.

== Career statistics ==
=== Club ===
As of 21 November 2026

| Club | Season | League | | | Cup (Note: Includes Norwegian Women's Cup, NWSL Challenge Cup and Taça de Portugal Feminina) | | Continental | | Other | | Total | |
| Club | Season | Division | Apps | Goals | Apps | Goals | Apps | Goals | Apps | Goals | Apps | Goals |
|---|---|---|---|---|---|---|---|---|---|---|---|---|
| Universidad de Chile | 2016 | CNFF | 33 | 50 | — | | — | | 1 (Note: Appearance(s) in Copa de Campeones) | 1 | 34 | 51 |
| UAI Urquiza | 2017–18 | Campeonato de Fútbol Femenino | 23 | 45 | — | | 3 (Note: Appearance(s) in Copa Libertadores Femenina) | 2 | — | | 26 | 47 |
| UAI Urquiza | 2018–19 | Campeonato de Fútbol Femenino | 22 | 27 | — | | 4 | 6 | — | | 26 | 33 |
| UAI Urquiza | 2019–20 | Campeonato de Fútbol Femenino | 1 | 2 | — | | — | | — | | 1 | 2 |
| UAI Urquiza | Total | | 46 | 74 | — | | 7 | 8 | — | | 53 | 82 |
| Lyn | 2020 | Toppserien | 3 | 0 | 1 | 0 | — | | — | | 4 | 0 |
| Kansas City | 2021 | NWSL | 19 | 2 | 2 | 0 | — | | — | | 21 | 2 |
| Sporting CP | 2021–22 | Campeonato Nacional Feminino | 8 | 3 | 5 | 1 | — | | 2 (Note: Appearance(s) in Taça da Liga Feminina) | 0 | 15 | 4 |
| Club León | 2022–23 | Liga MX Femenil | 26 | 9 | — | | — | | — | | 26 | 9 |
| Orlando Pride | 2023 | NWSL | 5 | 1 | 0 | 0 | — | | — | | 5 | 1 |
| Orlando Pride | 2024 | NWSL | 4 | 0 | — | | — | | — | | 4 | 0 |
| Orlando Pride | Total | | 9 | 1 | 0 | 0 | — | | — | | 9 | 1 |
| Newell's Old Boys | 2025 | Campeonato de Fútbol Femenino | 6 | 7 | — | | — | | — | | 6 | 7 |
| Lexington SC | 2025–26 | USL Super League | 0 | 0 | — | | — | | — | | 0 | 0 |
| Santos | 2026 | Série A1 | 20 | 3 | 0 | 0 | — | | 0 | 0 | 20 | 3 |
| Career total | | | 170 | 149 | 8 | 1 | 7 | 8 | 3 | 1 | 188 | 159 |

=== International ===
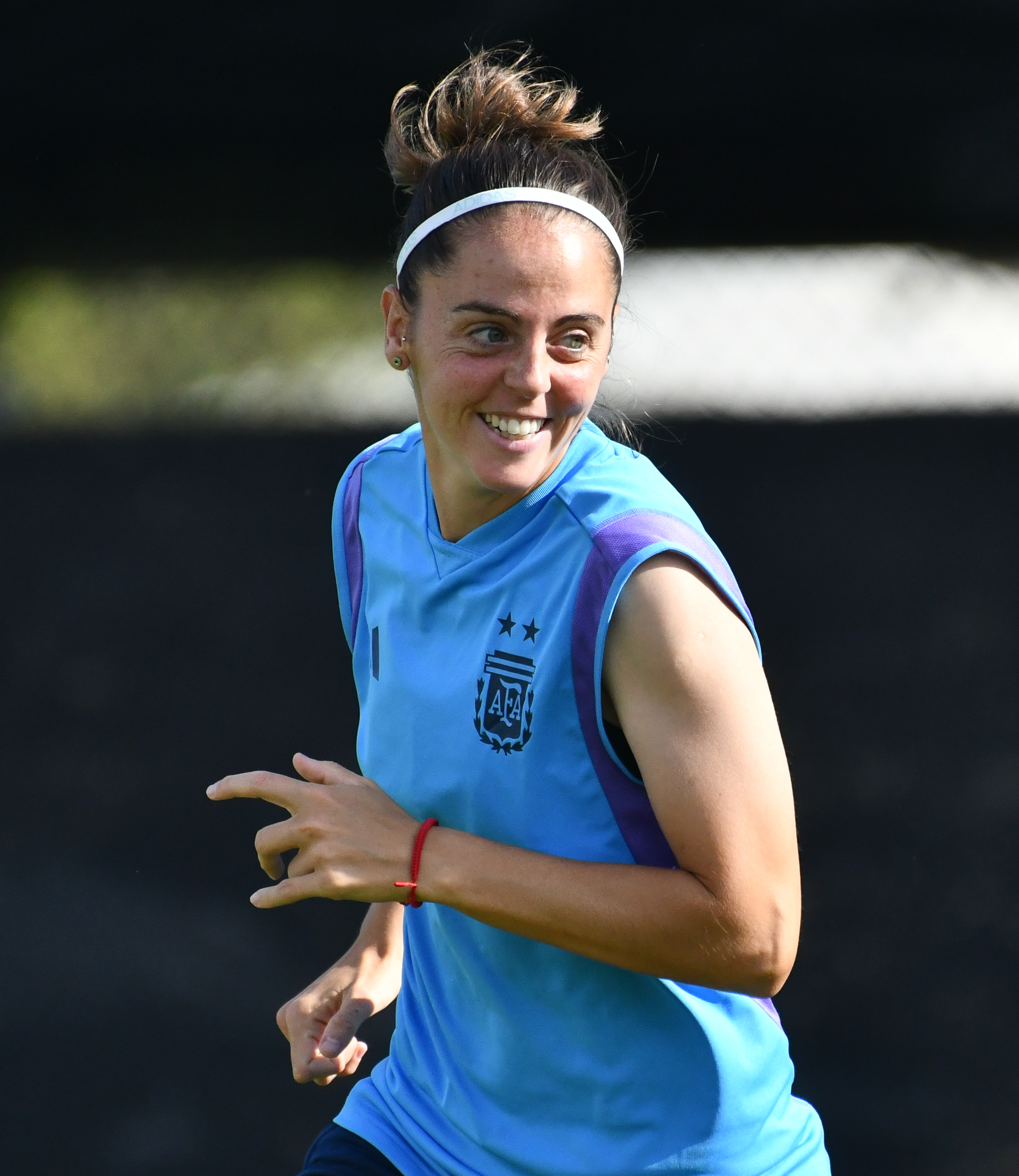
Larroquette training with the Argentina national team in 2023

As of match played 2 March 2024

Appearances and goals by national team and year
| National team | Year | Apps | Goals |
|---|---|---|---|
| Argentina | 2014 | 14 | 3 |
| Argentina | 2015 | 3 | 1 |
| Argentina | 2017 | 3 | 1 |
| Argentina | 2018 | 13 | 3 |
| Argentina | 2019 | 17 | 5 |
| Argentina | 2021 | 9 | 4 |
| Argentina | 2022 | 10 | 0 |
| Argentina | 2023 | 10 | 4 |
| Argentina | 2024 | 4 | 0 |
| Total | | 83 | 21 |

=== International goals ===
Scores and results list Argentina's goal tally first

| No. | Date | Venue | Opponent | Score | Result | Competition |
|---|---|---|---|---|---|---|
| 1 | 14 September 2014 | Estadio Bellavista, Ambato, Ecuador | Bolivia | 3–0 | 6–0 | 2014 Copa América Femenina |
| 2 | 14 September 2014 | Estadio Bellavista, Ambato, Ecuador | Bolivia | 5–0 | 6–0 | 2014 Copa América Femenina |
| 3 | 14 September 2014 | Estadio Bellavista, Ambato, Ecuador | Bolivia | 6–0 | 6–0 | 2014 Copa América Femenina |
| 4 | 11 July 2015 | Tim Hortons Field, Hamilton, Canada | Trinidad and Tobago | 1–0 | 2–2 | 2015 Pan American Games |
| 5 | 22 October 2017 | Estadio Diaguita, Ovalle, Chile | Chile | 1–0 | 2–2 | Friendly |
| 6 | 7 April 2018 | Estadio Municipal Francisco Sánchez Rumoroso, Coquimbo, Chile | Bolivia | 3–0 | 3–0 | 2018 Copa América Femenina |
| 7 | 9 April 2018 | Estadio Municipal Francisco Sánchez Rumoroso, Coquimbo, Chile | Ecuador | 2–0 | 6–3 | 2018 Copa América Femenina |
| 8 | 8 November 2018 | Estadio Julio Humberto Grondona, Sarandí, Argentina | Panama | 1–0 | 4–0 | 2019 FIFA Women's World Cup qualification |
| 9 | 28 July 2019 | Estadio Universidad San Marcos, Lima, Peru | Peru | 1–0 | 3–0 | 2019 Pan American Games |
| 10 | 28 July 2019 | Estadio Universidad San Marcos, Lima, Peru | Peru | 3–0 | 3–0 | 2019 Pan American Games |
| 11 | 31 July 2019 | Estadio Universidad San Marcos, Lima, Peru | Panama | 1–0 | 1–0 | 2019 Pan American Games |
| 12 | 6 August 2019 | Estadio Universidad San Marcos, Lima, Peru | Paraguay | 1–0 | 3–0 | 2019 Pan American Games |
| 13 | 7 November 2019 | Estadio General Adrián Jara, Luque Paraguay | Paraguay | 2–1 | 2–1 | Friendly |
| 14 | 18 February 2021 | Exploria Stadium, Orlando, Florida, United States | Brazil | 1–3 | 1–4 | 2021 SheBelieves Cup |
| 15 | 20 September 2021 | Estádio José Américo de Almeida Filho, João Pessoa, Brazil | Brazil | 1–3 | 1–4 | Friendly |
| 16 | 30 November 2021 | Estadio Rodrigo Paz Delgado, Quito, Ecuador | Ecuador | 1–0 | 2–2 | Friendly |
| 17 | 30 November 2021 | Estadio Rodrigo Paz Delgado, Quito, Ecuador | Ecuador | 2–2 | 2–2 | Friendly |
| 18 | 17 February 2023 | North Harbour Stadium, Auckland, New Zealand | Chile | 2–0 | 4–0 | Friendly |
| 19 | 20 February 2023 | Waikato Stadium, Hamilton, New Zealand | New Zealand | 1–0 | 2–0 | Friendly |
| 20 | 23 February 2023 | North Harbour Stadium, Hamilton, New Zealand | New Zealand | 1–0 | 1–0 | Friendly |
| 21 | 14 July 2023 | Estadio Único de San Nicolás, San Nicolás de los Arroyos, Argentina | Peru | 1–0 | 4–0 | Friendly |

== Honours ==
River Plate

- Campeonato de Fútbol Femenino: 2010 Clausura

Universidad de Chile

- Campeonato Nacional: 2016 Apertura

UAI Urquiza

- Campeonato de Fútbol Femenino: 2017–18, 2018–19

Orlando Pride

- NWSL Shield: 2024
- NWSL Championship: 2024

Newell's Old Boys

- Primera División A: 2025 Apertura
- Copa Federal: 2024
