= Mayara (footballer, born 2001) =

Brazilian footballer

Personal information
- Full name: Mayara Nabosne Harendt
- Date of birth: 3 August 2001 (age 25)
- Place of birth: Curitiba, Brazil
- Height: 1.78 m (5 ft 10 in)
- Position: Goalkeeper

Team information
- Current team: Santos

Senior career*
Years	Team	Apps	(Gls)
2017–2018	Imperial-PR		
2019–2025	Internacional	48	(0)
2026–	Santos	0	(0)

International career^{‡}
2018	Brazil U17	3	(0)
2019	Brazil U20	2	(0)
- * Club domestic league appearances and goals as of 22:50, 14 January 2026 (UTC) ‡ National team caps and goals as of 05:35, 6 May 2022 (UTC)

Mayara Nabosne Harendt (born 3 August 2001), simply known as Mayara, is a Brazilian professional footballer who plays as a goalkeeper for Santos.

== Club career ==
Born in Curitiba, Paraná, Mayara played for local side Imperial-PR before joining Internacional for the 2019 season. Initially a member of the under-18 squad, she made her first team debut on 30 August 2020, starting in a 2–1 away win over Ferroviária.

In July 2021, despite being backup option, Mayara renewed her contract with Inter. She became a starter in the 2022 season, but soon lost her starting spot in the following year. On 15 November 2024, she came on as a late substitute in the Campeonato Gaúcho semifinals against Juventude exclusively for the shoot-outs, and saved one of the penalties to qualify his side to the finals.

On 13 January 2026, Mayara was announced at Santos on a one-year deal.

== International career ==
After representing Brazil at under-17 and under-20 levels, Mayara received her first call up for the full side on 18 March 2022.

== Career statistics ==
As of 14 January 2026

Appearances and goals by club, season and competition
Club	Season	League			State league		Cup		Continental		Other		Total	
Club	Season	Division	Apps	Goals	Apps	Goals	Apps	Goals	Apps	Goals	Apps	Goals	Apps	Goals
Grêmio	2019	Série A1	0	0	0	0	—		—		—		0	0
Grêmio	2020	Série A1	4	0	0	0	—		—		—		4	0
Grêmio	2021	Série A1	0	0	3	0	—		—		—		3	0
Grêmio	2022	Série A1	14	0	0	0	—		—		1 (Note: Appearance(s) in Supercopa do Brasil de Futebol Feminino)	0	15	0
Grêmio	2023	Série A1	0	0	3	0	—		1 (Note: Appearance(s) in Copa Libertadores Femenina)	0	—		4	0
Grêmio	2024	Série A1	6	0	2	0	—		—		1	0	9	0
Grêmio	2025	Série A1	11	0	5	0	2	0	—		—		18	0
Grêmio	Total		35	0	13	0	2	0	1	0	2	0	53	0
Santos	2026	Série A1	0	0	0	0	0	0	—		—		0	0
Career total			35	0	13	0	2	0	1	0	2	0	53	0

== Honours ==
Internacional

- Campeonato Gaúcho de Futebol Feminino: 2019, 2021, 2023

Brazil U17

- South American U-17 Women's Championship: 2018
