= Carol Baiana =

Brazilian footballer (born 1994)

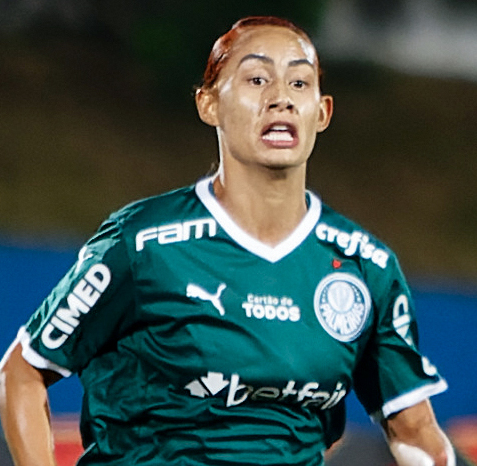
- Carol Baiana playing for Palmeiras in 2022

Personal information
- Full name: Ana Caroline Martins Rodrigues
- Date of birth: 28 October 1994 (age 32)
- Place of birth: Petrolina, Brazil
- Height: 1.72 m (5 ft 8 in)
- Position: Forward

Team information
- Current team: Santos
- Number: 19

College career
Years	Team	Apps	(Gls)
2013–2014	Monroe Mustangs	17	(21)
2015–2016	UCF Knights	39	(23)

Senior career*
Years	Team	Apps	(Gls)
2011–2013	Vitória das Tabocas		
2017–2019	Bordeaux	19	(5)
2019–2020	Dijon	12	(1)
2020	Hammarby	13	(6)
2021–2022	Palmeiras	53	(13)
2023	Cruzeiro	22	(16)
2024–	Santos	40	(12)

International career
2012–2014	Brazil U20	6	(1)
- * Club domestic league appearances and goals as of 13:01, 24 December 2025 (UTC)

Ana Caroline Martins Rodrigues (born 28 October 1994), known as Carol Baiana or just Carol, is a Brazilian footballer who plays as a forward for Santos FC.

== Club career ==
Born in Petrolina, Pernambuco but raised in Juazeiro, Bahia (which earned her the nickname of Baiana), Carol began her career with Vitória das Tabocas back in her native state, in 2011. In June 2013, she scored 15 goals in a 34–0 Campeonato Pernambucano win over PMPE.

In August 2013, Carol moved to the United States, joining Monroe College and representing the women's soccer team Monroe Mustangs. After an impressive 2014 season, where she scored 19 goals in just 15 appearances, she was included in the NSCAA Women's Division I All-American First Team.

In 2015, Carol continued her studies at the University of Central Florida, playing for the UCF Knights. In January 2017, after finishing her graduation, she was included in the 2017 NWSL College Draft and spent the pre-season with Orlando Pride, but was not picked.

On 22 August 2017, Carol signed a two-year contract with Division 1 Féminine side Bordeaux. She struggled with injuries at her new side, and moved to Dijon FCO in August 2019.

On 12 August 2020, Carol left Dijon to join Damallsvenskan side Hammarby. The following 12 February, she returned to her home country after being announced at Palmeiras.

Carol helped Verdão to win their first-ever Copa Libertadores Femenina in 2022, but mainly as a backup option. On 18 January 2023, she signed for Cruzeiro, but left on 13 December.

On 15 January 2024, Carol was announced at Santos.

== International career ==
Carol represented Brazil at under-20 level in the 2012 and 2014 FIFA U-20 Women's World Cup.

== Career statistics ==
As of 24 December 2025

Appearances and goals by club, season and competition
Club	Season	League			State league		Cup		Continental		Other		Total	
Club	Season	Division	Apps	Goals	Apps	Goals	Apps	Goals	Apps	Goals	Apps	Goals	Apps	Goals
Bordeaux	2017–18	Division 1 Féminine	7	3	—		—		—		—		7	3
Bordeaux	2018–19	Division 1 Féminine	11	2	—		—		—		—		11	2
Bordeaux	Total		18	5	—		—		—		—		18	5
Dijon	2019–20	Division 1 Féminine	12	1	—		—		—		—		12	1
Hammarby	2020	Elitettan	13	6	—		—		—		—		13	6
Palmeiras	2021	Série A1	16	5	9	1	—		—		4 (Note: Appearance(s) in Copa Paulista de Futebol Feminino)	0	29	6
Palmeiras	2022	Série A1	14	7	14	0	—		6 (Note: Appearance(s) in Copa Libertadores Femenina)	1	1 (Note: Appearance(s) in Supercopa do Brasil de Futebol Feminino)	0	35	8
Palmeiras	Total		30	12	23	1	—		6	1	5	0	64	14
Cruzeiro	2023	Série A1	16	7	6	9	—		—		—		22	16
Santos	2024	Série A1	14	4	3	1	—		4	1	4	1	25	7
Santos	2025	Série A2	11	4	12	3	2	0	—		3	4	28	11
Santos	Total		25	8	15	4	2	0	4	1	7	5	53	18
Career total			114	39	44	14	2	0	10	2	12	5	182	60

== Honours ==
Vitória das Tabocas

- Campeonato Pernambucano de Futebol Feminino: 2011, 2012, 2013

Palmeiras

- Copa Paulista de Futebol Feminino: 2021
- Copa Libertadores Femenina: 2022
- Campeonato Paulista de Futebol Feminino: 2022

Santos

- Copa Paulista de Futebol Feminino: 2024
- Campeonato Brasileiro de Futebol Feminino Série A2: 2025
