= Taty Amaro =

Brazilian footballer (born 1995)

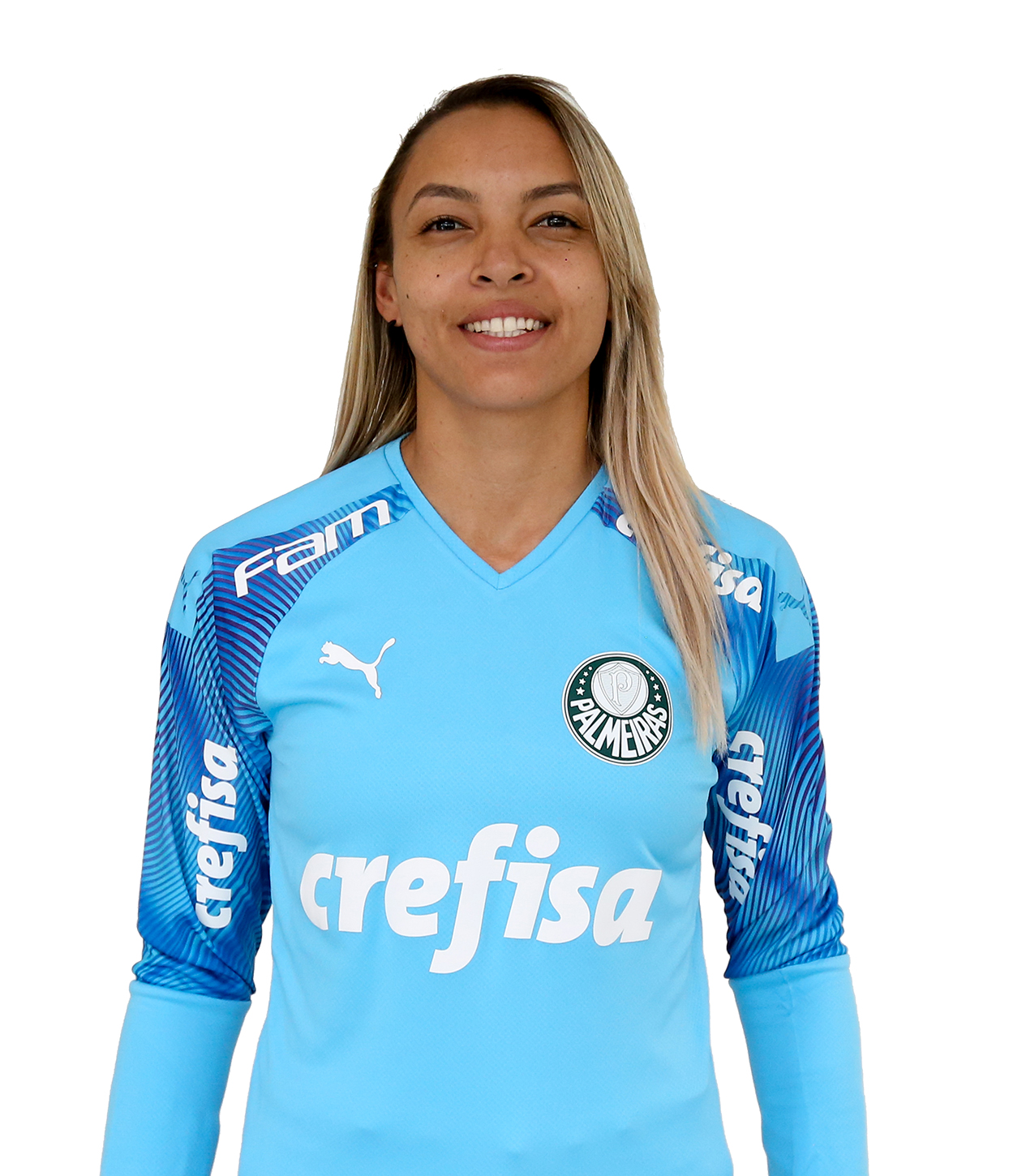
- Taty Amaro in 2021

Personal information
- Full name: Tatyane Amaro Santos
- Date of birth: 10 May 1995 (age 31)
- Place of birth: Uruaçu, Brazil
- Height: 1.77 m (5 ft 10 in)
- Position: Goalkeeper

Team information
- Current team: Santos
- Number: 31

Senior career*
Years	Team	Apps	(Gls)
2014	Iranduba	3	(0)
2016	Vitória	4	(0)
2016	CRESSPOM		
2017–2018	São José	26	(0)
2019–2020	Corinthians	7	(0)
2020	→ Nordsjælland (loan)	8	(0)
2021	Palmeiras	9	(0)
2022–2025	Cruzeiro	55	(0)
2026–	Santos	0	(0)
- * Club domestic league appearances and goals as of 14:26, 10 January 2026 (UTC)

Tatyane Amaro Santos (born 10 May 1995), known as Taty Amaro, is a Brazilian footballer who plays as a goalkeeper for Santos.

== Career ==
Born in Uruaçu, Goiás, Taty Amaro began her career with Iranduba in 2014. On 9 January 2019, after playing for Vitória, CRESSPOM and São José, she was announced at Corinthians.

On 31 July 2020, after being a third-choice behind Letícia Izidoro and Tainá, Taty Amaro was loaned to Nordsjælland in Denmark. The following 14 January, she returned to her home country and joined Palmeiras.

On 31 January 2022, Taty Amaro signed for Cruzeiro. She would gradually establish herself as a starter, signing several one-year extensions to continue at the club.

On 6 January 2026, Santos announced the signing of Taty Amaro on a two-year contract.

== Career statistics ==
As of 10 January 2026

Appearances and goals by club, season and competition
Club	Season	League			State league		Cup		Continental		Other		Total	
Club	Season	Division	Apps	Goals	Apps	Goals	Apps	Goals	Apps	Goals	Apps	Goals	Apps	Goals
Iranduba	2014	Série A1	3	0	?	?	4	0	—		—		7	0
Vitória	2016	Série A1	4	0	—		—		—		—		4	0
São José	2017	Série A1	0	0	1	0	—		—		—		1	0
São José	2018	Série A1	11	0	14	0	—		—		—		25	0
São José	Total		11	0	15	0	—		—		—		26	0
Corinthians	2019	Série A1	3	0	4	0	—		0	0	—		7	0
Corinthians	2020	Série A1	0	0	0	0	—		—		—		0	0
Corinthians	Total		3	0	4	0	—		0	0	—		7	0
Nordsjælland	2020–21	A-Liga	8	0	—		0	0	—		—		8	0
Palmeiras	2021	Série A1	4	0	5	0	—		—		0	0	9	0
Cruzeiro	2022	Série A1	5	0	6	0	—		—		—		11	0
Cruzeiro	2023	Série A1	10	0	8	0	—		—		—		18	0
Cruzeiro	2024	Série A1	15	0	6	0	—		—		3 (Note: Appearance(s) in Supercopa do Brasil de Futebol Feminino)	0	24	0
Cruzeiro	2025	Série A1	4	0	1	0	—		—		1	0	6	0
Cruzeiro	Total		34	0	21	0	—		—		4	0	59	0
Santos	2026	Série A1	0	0	0	0	0	0	—		—		0	0
Career total			67	0	45	0	4	0	0	0	4	0	120	0

== Honours ==
Corinthians

- Copa Libertadores Femenina: 2019
- Campeonato Paulista de Futebol Feminino: 2019
- Campeonato Brasileiro de Futebol Feminino Série A1: 2020

Palmeiras

- Copa Paulista de Futebol Feminino: 2021

Cruzeiro

- Campeonato Mineiro de Futebol Feminino: 2023, 2024, 2025
