= Carol Lara =

Brazilian footballer (born 2003)

Personal information
- Full name: Caroliny Lara da Silva Azevedo
- Date of birth: 13 August 2003 (age 23)
- Place of birth: Conselheiro Lafaiete, Brazil
- Height: 1.65 m (5 ft 5 in)
- Positions: Right-back; winger

Team information
- Current team: Santos
- Number: 27

Youth career
- Flor da Serra
- Ferroviário-MG
- Aimoré-MG
- 2019–2020: América Mineiro

Senior career*
Years	Team	Apps	(Gls)
2020–2022	América Mineiro	41	(6)
2023	Red Bull Bragantino	23	(2)
2024–	Santos	0	(0)

International career
2022	Brazil U20	3	(0)
- * Club domestic league appearances and goals as of 04:03, 19 January 2024 (UTC)

Caroliny Lara da Silva Azevedo (born 13 August 2003), known as Carol Lara or just Carol, is a Brazilian professional footballer who plays as either a right-back or a winger for Santos.

== Club career ==
Carol was born in Conselheiro Lafaiete, Minas Gerais, and joined América Mineiro in 2019 after playing for amateur clubs in her hometown. She made her senior debut in the 2020 season, and renewed her contract with Coelho on 19 July 2021.

Ahead of the 2023 season, Carol moved to Red Bull Bragantino. On 27 November of that year, after winning the Campeonato Brasileiro de Futebol Feminino Série A2, she left the club.

On 17 January 2024, Carol was announced at Santos on a two-year contract.

== International career ==
Carol represented Brazil at under-20 level in the 2022 South American Under-20 Women's Football Championship.

== Career statistics ==
As of 24 December 2025

Appearances and goals by club, season and competition
Club	Season	League			State league		Cup		Continental		Other		Total	
Club	Season	Division	Apps	Goals	Apps	Goals	Apps	Goals	Apps	Goals	Apps	Goals	Apps	Goals
América Mineiro	2020	Série A2	7	1	6	0	—		—		—		13	1
América Mineiro	2021	Série A2	9	3	6	0	—		—		—		15	3
América Mineiro	2022	Série A2	6	0	7	2	—		—		—		13	2
América Mineiro	Total		22	4	19	2	—		—		—		41	6
Red Bull Bragantino	2023	Série A2	13	1	10	1	—		—		4 (Note: Appearance(s) in Copa Paulista de Futebol Feminino)	0	27	2
Santos	2024	Série A1	0	0	0	0	—		0	0	0	0	0	0
Santos	2025	Série A2	0	0	0	0	0	0	—		0	0	0	0
Santos	Total		0	0	0	0	0	0	0	0	0	0	0	0
Career total			35	5	29	3	0	0	0	0	4	0	68	8

== Honours ==
Red Bull Bragantino

- Campeonato Brasileiro de Futebol Feminino Série A2: 2023

Santos

- Copa Paulista de Futebol Feminino: 2024
- Campeonato Brasileiro de Futebol Feminino Série A2: 2025

Brazil U20

- South American Under-20 Women's Football Championship: 2022
