= Giulia Giovanna =

Brazilian footballer (born 2004)

Personal information
- Full name: Giulia Giovanna Xavier de Magalhães
- Date of birth: 27 March 2004 (age 22)
- Place of birth: Brasília, Brazil
- Height: 1.67 m (5 ft 6 in)
- Position: Midfielder

Team information
- Current team: Santos
- Number: 32

Youth career
- 2018–2021: Minas Brasília
- 2021–2023: São Paulo
- 2023–2024: Internacional

Senior career*
Years	Team	Apps	(Gls)
2019–2021	Minas Brasília	1	(0)
2019	→ Brazlândia (loan)	1	(0)
2023–2024	Internacional	3	(0)
2025–	Santos	5	(0)
- * Club domestic league appearances and goals as of 20:33, 29 December 2025 (UTC)

Giulia Giovanna Xavier de Magalhães (born 27 March 2004), known as Giulia Giovanna or sometimes as GG, is a Brazilian footballer who plays as an attacking midfielder for Santos.

== Club career ==
Born in Brasília, Federal District, Giulia Giovanna began her career with hometown side Minas Brasília, but made her senior debut with Brazlândia in the 2019 Campeonato Brasiliense, after both clubs established a partnership. Back to Minas in 2020, she made her professional debut on 30 August of that year, coming on as a second-half substitute in a 2–0 Campeonato Brasileiro Série A1 away loss to São Paulo.

In 2021, Giulia Giovanna moved to São Paulo, being initially a member of the under-17 squad. On 2 August 2023, she joined Internacional on a deal until December 2025.

On 29 February 2024, Giulia Giovanna signed a professional contract with Inter, also until 2025. She left the club in December after three first team appearanced, and agreed to a two-year deal with Santos on 9 January 2025.

== International career ==
Giulia Giovanna received call-ups to the Brazil national under-17 team in 2020.

== Honours ==
Internacional

- Campeonato Gaúcho de Futebol Feminino: 2023

Santos

- Campeonato Brasileiro de Futebol Feminino Série A2: 2025
