= Porto Firme =

Brazilian municipality located in the state of Minas Gerais

Coordinates: 20°40′S 43°06′W

- Municipality
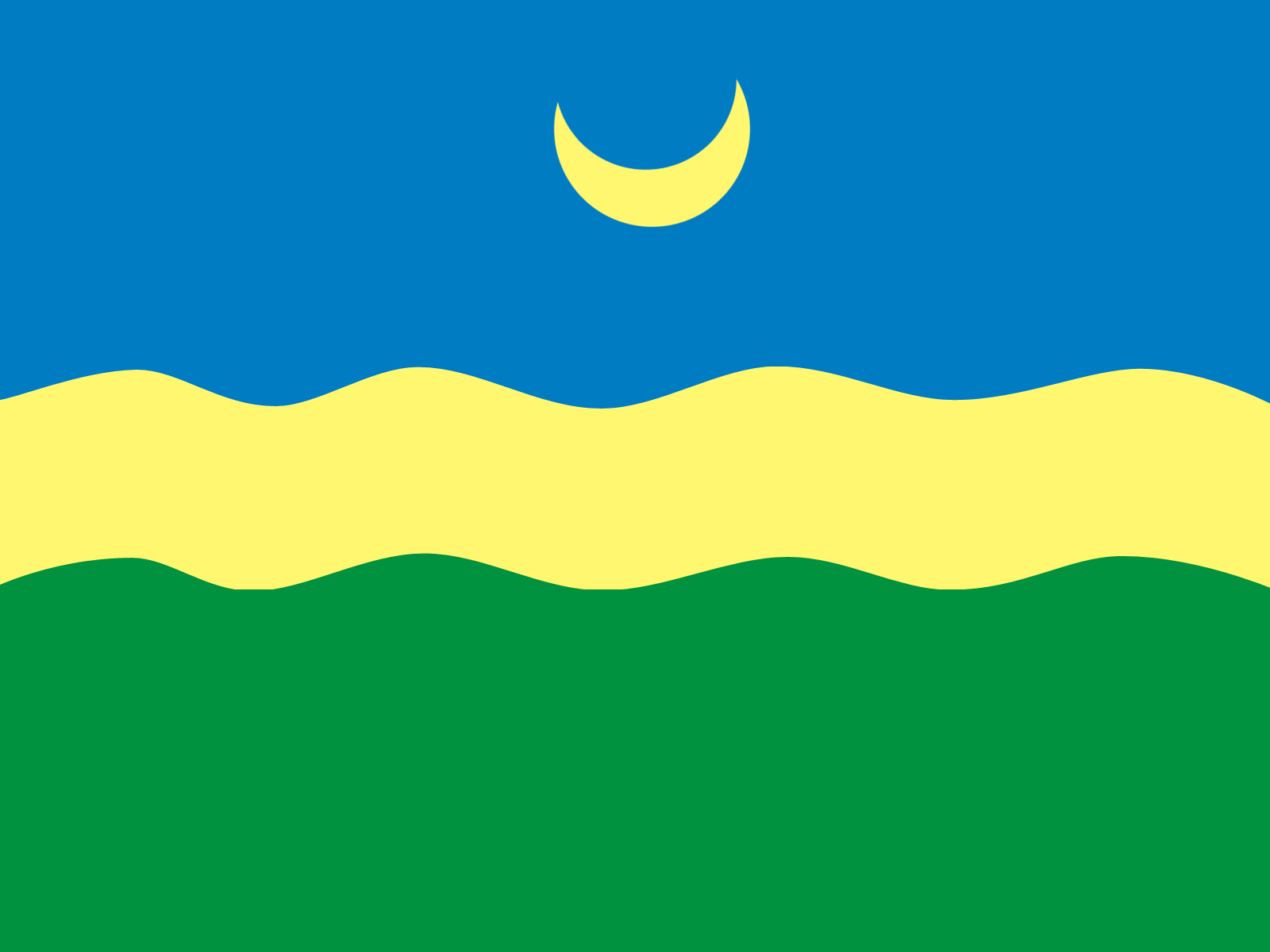
- Flag
- Interactive map of Porto Firme
- Country: Brazil
- State: Minas Gerais
- Region: Southeast
- Time zone: UTC−3 (BRT)

Location of Porto Firme within Minas Gerais

Porto Firme is a Brazilian municipality located in the state of Minas Gerais. The city belongs to the mesoregion of Zona da Mata and to the microregion of Viçosa. As of 2020, the estimated population was 11,348.

== See also ==
- List of municipalities in Minas Gerais
