= Suzane Pires =

Portuguese footballer

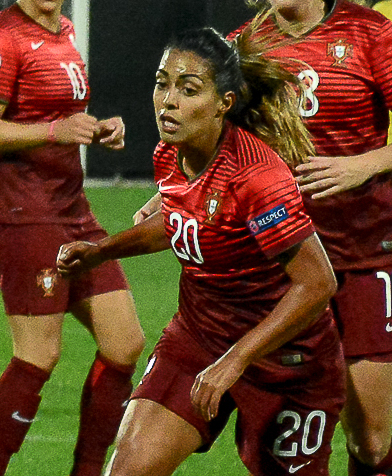

Personal information
- Full name: Suzane Pires Cardozo
- Birth name: Suzane Lira Pires
- Date of birth: 17 August 1992 (age 34)
- Place of birth: São Paulo, Brazil
- Height: 1.68 m (5 ft 6 in)
- Position: Midfielder

Team information
- Current team: Santos
- Number: 8

Youth career
- Juventus-SP

College career
Years	Team	Apps	(Gls)
2010–2013	Southern Connecticut Owls	70	(25)

Senior career*
Years	Team	Apps	(Gls)
2015	Boston Breakers	12	(0)
2015	Portuguesa	3	(0)
2016–2017	Santos	41	(5)
2018–2020	Marítimo		
2021–2023	Ferroviária	78	(10)
2024–	Santos	50	(3)

International career^{‡}
2015–	Portugal	28	(0)
- * Club domestic league appearances and goals as of 04:18, 24 December 2025 (UTC) ‡ National team caps and goals as of 17 February 2023

Suzane Pires Cardozo (born Suzane Lira Pires; 17 August 1992), simply known as Suzane, is a Brazilian-born Portuguese professional footballer who plays as a midfielder for Santos and the Portugal women's national team.

== Early life ==
Suzane was born and raised in São Paulo, but moved to Stuttgart at young age. After representing Juventus-SP as a youth, she was offered a scholarship at the Southern Connecticut State University, playing for the Southern Connecticut Owls.

== Club career ==
=== Boston Breakers ===
Suzane has played for the Boston Breakers in the National Women's Soccer League. She made her league debut against Portland Thorns on 12 April 2015.

Suzane Pires was waived by the Boston Breakers in October 2015.

=== Portuguesa ===
Suzane Pires made her league debut against Flamengo on 13 September 2015.

=== First spell at Santos ===
In 2016, Suzane joined Santos. She helped the club to win their first-ever Campeonato Brasileiro de Futebol Feminino Série A1 in 2017 as a starter, but suffered a knee injury afterwards, and opted to leave the club at the end of the season to follow her husband to Portugal.

=== Marítimo ===
On 5 September 2018, after a period without a club, Suzane joined Marítimo.

=== Ferroviária ===
On 9 April 2021, she signed for Ferroviária. Suzane Pires made her league debut against Grêmio on 6 June 2021. She scored her first league goal against São José on 2 April 2022, scoring in the 6th minute.

=== Second spell at Santos ===
On 9 January 2024, after being a regular starter at AFE Suzane returned to Santos. She made her league debut against Real Brasília on 15 March 2024.

== International career ==
Besides Brazil, Suzane was also eligible to play for Portugal through her paternal grandfather, who was born in Braga. She made her senior debut with the latter on 26 November 2015, in a 6–1 win over Montenegro.

On 6 July 2017, Suzane was called up to the UEFA Women's Euro 2017, the nation's first ever continental competition. On 5 July 2022, she was included in the 23-women squad for the UEFA Women's Euro 2022, replacing injured Andreia Jacinto.

== Personal life ==
Suzane is married to Brazilian male footballer Gauther Martins Cardozo, with whom she has a son, who is also called Gauther.

== Career statistics ==
=== Club ===
As of 24 December 2025

Appearances and goals by club, season and competition
Club	Season	League			State league		Cup		Continental		Other		Total	
Club	Season	Division	Apps	Goals	Apps	Goals	Apps	Goals	Apps	Goals	Apps	Goals	Apps	Goals
Boston Breakers	2015	NWSL	12	0	—		—		—		—		12	0
Portuguesa	2015	Série A1	3	0	—		—		—		—		3	0
Santos	2016	Série A1	0	0	16	5	2	1	—		—		18	6
Santos	2017	Série A1	17	0	8	0	—		—		—		25	0
Santos	Total		17	0	24	5	2	1	—		—		43	6
Ferroviária	2021	Série A1	7	0	12	1	—		6 (Note: Appearance(s) in Copa Libertadores Femenina)	1	—		25	2
Ferroviária	2022	Série A1	17	1	12	3	—		3	0	—		32	4
Ferroviária	2023	Série A1	20	4	10	1	—		—		4 (Note: Appearance(s) in Copa Paulista de Futebol Feminino)	0	34	5
Ferroviária	Total		44	5	34	5	—		9	1	4	0	91	11
Santos	2024	Série A1	15	0	9	1	—		4	1	1	0	29	2
Santos	2025	Série A2	13	2	13	0	2	0	—		3	0	31	2
Santos	Total		28	2	22	1	2	0	4	1	4	0	60	4
Career total			104	7	80	11	4	1	13	2	8	0	209	21

=== International ===
As of 13 February 2024

National team	Year	Apps	Goals
Portugal	2015	2	0
Portugal	2016	13	0
Portugal	2017	8	0
Portugal	2021	2	0
Portugal	2022	3	0
Total		28	0

== Honours ==
Santos

- Campeonato Brasileiro de Futebol Feminino Série A1: 2017
- Copa Paulista de Futebol Feminino: 2024
- Campeonato Brasileiro de Futebol Feminino Série A2: 2025
