= Marcelo Frigerio =

Italian-Brazilian football player and manager

Personal information
- Full name: Marcelo Maria Frigerio
- Date of birth: 30 January 1971 (age 55)
- Place of birth: Milan, Italy

Team information
- Current team: Santos (women) (head coach)

Youth career
- Years: Team
- Palmeiras

Managerial career
- 1996: Clube das Bandeiras (futsal)
- 1997: World Ball/São Caetano (futsal)
- 1997: Metalúrgica (futsal)
- 1997–2007: UniSanta'anna/Osasco (women)
- 1997: Juventus-SP (women)
- 1998: Portuguesa (futsal)
- 1998–2000: São Bento (women)
- 2000–2003: Palmeiras (women)
- 2001–2003: Brazil Universiade (women)
- 2001–2008: São Paulo selection (women)
- 2003: Palmeiras (youth)
- 2005: Inter de Limeira U20
- 2005: São Paulo selection (futsal U20)
- 2005: Carbonia Calcio
- 2006: São Caetano (women)
- 2007: America-RJ (women)
- 2007: CEUNSP/Salto (women)
- 2007: CEUNSP/Salto (futsal)
- 2008: Atletico Oristano (women)
- 2008: Palmeiras (women)
- 2008: São Caetano (futsal)
- 2009: Saad (women)
- 2010: Palmeiras (women)
- 2011: Equatorial Guinea (women)
- 2012–2013: XV de Piracicaba (women)
- 2014: Kindermann (women)
- 2015: São Paulo (women)
- 2016: Atlético Sorocaba
- 2016: Atibaia
- 2017: Foz Cataratas (women)
- 2017: 3B da Amazônia (women)
- 2018: Changchun Zhuoyue (women)
- 2019: Audax (women)
- 2020: 3B da Amazônia (women)
- 2020–2021: Cruzeiro (women)
- 2021–2023: Paraguay (women)
- 2023: Grêmio (women)
- 2024–2025: UNAM (women)
- 2026–: Santos (women)

Marcelo Maria Frigerio (born 30 January 1971), sometimes known as Tchelo, is a Brazilian football coach and former player. He is the current head coach of Santos' women's team.

== Early life ==
Frigerio was born in Milan, Italy, but grew up from a young age in São Paulo. He holds dual citizenship in Italy and Brazil. He also worked as a commentator for BandNews and BandSports during the 2004 Summer Olympics and 2007 Pan American Games.

== Career ==
Frigerio began his career as a footballer, playing in the youth team of Palmeiras. He later became a coach, and after leading the women's college teams of ESPM, FMU and FAAP, he was in charge of both men and women's football and futsal teams in Brazil and Italy. He also coached the Brazil women's Universiade team at the 2001 Summer Universiade, winning the gold medal.

Frigerio first coached a women's football side in 1997, being in charge of Juventus-SP. After working at São Bento and Palmeiras, he spent a period in charge of men's sides, before returning to women's teams in 2006 with São Caetano.

Frigerio returned to Palmeiras in 2008, being later in charge of São Caetano's futsal team. He then took over Saad in the following year, and returned to Verdão in 2010.

Frigerio was the head coach of the Equatorial Guinea women's national team at the 2011 FIFA Women's World Cup, and returned to his home country in the following year, taking over the women's side of XV de Piracicaba. He later worked at Kindermann and São Paulo (women), before switching to men's football again on 15 January 2016, after being named at the helm of Atlético Sorocaba in the Campeonato Paulista Série A2. He left the latter days after taking over, after alleging having better offers from abroad.

In April 2016, Frigerio replaced Luiz Muller as Atibaia's head coach; he was already working as a youth coordinator at the club. He began the 2017 season at Foz Cataratas, as the club had a partnership with Coritiba, but was sacked in March.

On 15 September 2017, Frigerio was announced as head coach of 3B da Amazônia for the Campeonato Amazonense de Futebol Feminino. He left after the season ended, and moved to China to coach Changchun Zhuoyue at the 2018 Chinese Women's Super League.

Frigerio returned to Brazil in 2019, as head coach of Audax's women's team, before returning to 3B in January 2020. He left after his contract ended in June, and was announced at the helm of Cruzeiro on 28 September.

Despite having his contract renewed in January 2021, Frigerio was sacked by the Cabulosas in June, after a poor run of form. On 9 December 2021, he was announced as head coach of the Paraguay women's national team, and led the side in the 2022 Copa América Femenina.

On 25 July 2023, Grêmio announced Frigerio as head coach of their women's side. He left on 7 December, and moved to mexico to take over UNAM seven days later. On 4 November 2025, Pumas announced his departure.

On 25 April 2026, Frigerio was appointed head coach of Santos' women's team, replacing sacked Caio Couto.
