= Santos FC (women) =

Women's football club based in Santos, São Paulo, Brazil

Santos
- Full name: Santos Futebol Clube
- Nickname: Sereias da Vila
- Founded: 1997
- Ground: Vila Belmiro, Santos
- Capacity: 16,798
- President: Marcelo Teixeira
- Head coach: Marcelo Frigerio
- League: Campeonato Brasileiro Série A1; Campeonato Paulista
- 2025 2025: Série A2, 1st of 16 (champions); Paulista, 6th of 8
Home colours	Away colours	Third colours

Santos Futebol Clube, commonly known as Santos or Sereias da Vila, is a Brazilian women's association football club, based in the city of Santos, São Paulo state, Brazil. They won the Campeonato Brasileiro de Futebol Feminino once, the Copa do Brasil twice and the Copa Libertadores Femenina twice.

== History ==
The club was created in 1997 as part of Santos, in a partnership with Fundação Pró-Esportes de Santos (Fupes). They won two national competitions, which are the Liga Nacional in 2007, the Copa do Brasil in 2008. The club won the Copa Mercosul in 2006, and the Campeonato Paulista in 2007. The Campeonato Paulista organized by LINAF was won by Santos in 2009, beating Corinthians in the final. Santos competed in the 2009 Copa Libertadores, winning the competition after beating Universidad Autónoma of Paraguay 9–0 in the final, played on 18 October. They won the 2009 Copa do Brasil on 1 December 2009, after beating Botucatu 3–0 in the final, played at Estádio do Pacaembu. In 2010, they won again the Copa Libertadores, after beating Everton 1–0 in Arena Barueri, and in 2011 they won the Campeonato Paulista again, after they beat Centro Olímpico in the final.

=== Closure 2012 ===
The women's section was closed in 2012. The club's president Luis Álvaro de Oliveira Ribeiro closed down the women's team and the men's futsal team because an alleged lack of sponsorship meant they were not self-sustaining. It was attributed to the effort of holding male star player Neymar at Santos.

=== 2015 Reestablishment ===
In 2015 incoming Santos president Modesto Roma Júnior reinstated the women's team, as part of wider reforms aimed at repairing the previous regime's financial mismanagement.

== Players ==
=== Current squad ===
As of 21 August 2026.

Note: Flags indicate national team as defined under FIFA eligibility rules; some limited exceptions apply. Players may hold more than one non-FIFA nationality.

No.	Pos.	Nation	Player
1	GK	BRA	Stefane
2	DF	BRA	Larissa Vasconcelos
3	DF	BRA	Rafa Martins
4	DF	BRA	Ana Alice
5	MF	BRA	Nath Pitbull
6	DF	BRA	Isa Cardoso
7	FW	BRA	Ketlen
8	MF	POR	Suzane Pires
9	FW	BRA	Carol Baiana
10	MF	BRA	Thaisinha
11	FW	BRA	Laryh
12	GK	BRA	Mayara
13	FW	BRA	Samara
14	DF	BRA	Leandra
15	FW	COL	Wendy Bonilla
16	DF	BRA	Barbara Cuzzuol
17	FW	BRA	Analuyza
18	DF	BRA	Letícia Santos

No.	Pos.	Nation	Player
19	FW	ARG	Mariana Larroquette
21	DF	BRA	Ingryd Avancini
22	DF	BRA	Evellyn Marques
25	MF	BRA	Vivian
27	DF	BRA	Carol Lara
29	FW	BRA	Anna Cury
30	FW	BRA	Ana Barboza
31	GK	BRA	Taty Amaro
32	MF	BRA	Giulia Giovanna
33	DF	BRA	Pardal
34	FW	BRA	Evelin Bonifácio
35	MF	BRA	Luiza Maria
37	FW	BRA	Camile Abreu
70	MF	COL	Yoreli Rincón
88	MF	BRA	Rafa Andrade
97	DF	BRA	Katrine
—	FW	BRA	Gabi Leveque

=== Youth team ===
Note: Flags indicate national team as defined under FIFA eligibility rules; some limited exceptions apply. Players may hold more than one non-FIFA nationality.

No.	Pos.	Nation	Player
38	DF	BRA	Sara

=== Out on loan ===
Note: Flags indicate national team as defined under FIFA eligibility rules; some limited exceptions apply. Players may hold more than one non-FIFA nationality.

No.	Pos.	Nation	Player

== Stadium ==
Santos play their home games at Estádio Vila Belmiro, hence the club's nickname Sereias da Vila, meaning Vila's Mermaids. The stadium has a maximum capacity of 16,798 people. They also play occasionally at neighbouring Estádio Ulrico Mursa, which is owned by Portuguesa Santista.

== Honours ==
=== Official tournaments ===
Continental
Competitions	Titles	Seasons
Copa Libertadores Femenina	2	2009, 2010
National
Competitions	Titles	Seasons
Campeonato Brasileiro Série A1	1	2017
Copa do Brasil	2^{s}	2008, 2009
Taça Brasil	1^{s}	2007
Campeonato Brasileiro Série A2	1	2025
State
Competitions	Titles	Seasons
Campeonato Paulista	4^{s}	2007, 2010, 2011, 2018
Copa Paulista	2^{s}	2020, 2024

- record
- ^{s} shared record

=== Youth team ===
- Campeonato Paulista Sub-17 (1): 2020

== See also ==
- Santos FC
- Santos FC (beach soccer)
- Santos FC Futsal
- Santos FC Futebol de mesa
- Santos FC Judô
- Santos FC Caratê
