= Campeonato Paranaense de Futebol Feminino =

Women's football league in Paraná, Brazil

- Founded: 1998
- Country: Brazil
- Confederation: FPF
- Promotion to: Brasileiro Série A3
- Current champions: Coritiba (2nd title) (2026)
- Most championships: Foz Cataratas (7 titles)
- Current: 2026

The Campeonato Paranaense de Futebol Feminino is the women's football state championship of Paraná State, and is contested since 1998.

== List of champions ==
Following is the list with all recognized titles of Campeonato Paranaense Feminino:

Season	Champions	Runners-up
1998	União Ahú (1)	
1999	União Ahú (1)	
2000	Seleto Maringá (1)	São Paulo EC
2001	Gresfi (1)	São Paulo EC
2002	Novo Mundo (1)	Gresfi
2003	Novo Mundo (2)	Colombo
2004	Novo Mundo (3)	CUE São José
2005	CUE São José (1)	Novo Mundo
2006	CUE São José (2)	Vila Heuer
2007	Jaborá (1)	CUE São José
2008	Novo Mundo (4)	CUE São José
2009	Not held	
2010	Foz do Iguaçu FC (1)	Jaborá
2011	Foz Cataratas (1)	Novo Mundo
2012	Foz Cataratas (2)	Novo Mundo
2013	Foz Cataratas (3)	Foz do Iguaçu FC
2014	Foz Cataratas (4)	Assaí
2015–2016	Not held	
2017	Foz Cataratas (5)	Toledo
2018	Foz Cataratas (6)	Toledo
2019	Foz Cataratas (7)	Toledo
2020	Athletico Paranaense (1)	Imperial
2021	Athletico Paranaense (2)	Toledo
2022	Athletico Paranaense (3)	Toledo
2023	Athletico Paranaense (4)	Coritiba
2024	Athletico Paranaense (5)	Coritiba
2025	Coritiba (1)	Toledo
2026	Coritiba (2)	Imperial

== Titles by team ==
Teams in bold stills active.

Rank	Club	Winners	Winning years
1	**Foz Cataratas**	7	2011, 2012, 2013, 2014, 2017, 2018, 2019
2	**Athletico Paranaense**	5	2020, 2021, 2022, 2023, 2024
3	Novo Mundo	4	2002, 2003, 2004, 2008
4	CUE São José	2	2005, 2006
4	União Ahú	2	1998, 1999
4	**Coritiba**	2	2025, 2026
7	**Foz do Iguaçu FC**	1	2010
7	Gresfi	1	2001
7	Jaborá	1	2007
7	Seleto Maringá	1	2000

=== By city ===
City	Championships	Clubs
Curitiba	13	Athletico Paranaense (5), Novo Mundo (4), União Ahú (2), Coritiba (2)
Foz do Iguaçu	9	Foz Cataratas (7), Foz do Iguaçu FC (1), Gresfi (1)
São José dos Pinhais	3	CUE São José (2), Jaborá (1)
Maringá	1	Seleto Maringá (1)
