= 2022 Sport Club Corinthians Paulista (women) season =

Corinthians 2022 football season

Corinthians
2022 season
- President: Duílio Monteiro Alves
- Manager: Arthur Elias
- Stadium: Parque São Jorge / Neo Química Arena
- Série A1: Winners
- Supercopa do Brasil: Winners
- Campeonato Paulista: First stage
- Copa Libertadores: Quarter-finals
- Copa Paulista: Winners
- Top goalscorer: League: Adriana (9); All: Jheniffer (18)
- Highest home attendance: 41,070 vs Internacional (24 September 2022)
- Lowest home attendance: 305 vs Portuguesa (18 August 2022)
Home colors	Away colors	Third colors

The 2022 season was the 20th season in the history of Sport Club Corinthians Paulista's women team. In addition to the domestic league, Corinthians participated in this season's editions of the Supercopa do Brasil, Copa Libertadores Femenina, Campeonato Paulista and Copa Paulista. Corinthians was coming off a successful 2021 campaign by being the first Brazilian women's club to win the treble after winning the league, Copa Libertadores Femenina, and Campeonato Paulista. There was a mid-season break due to the 2022 Copa América Femenina.

== Background ==
=== Kits ===
- Home (26 April 2022 onward): White shirt, black shorts and white socks;
- Away (8 May 2022 onward): Black shirt, white shorts and black socks;
- Third (7 October 2022 onward): Beige shirt with shodô stripes, black shorts and beige socks;

=== Previous Kits ===
- Home (Until 25 April 2022): White shirt, black shorts and white socks;
- Away (Until 7 May 2022): Black with white stripes shirt, white shorts and black socks;
- Third (Until 6 October 2022): Purple shirt, purple shorts and purple socks.

== Squad ==
As of 8 October 2022

Note: Flags indicate national team as defined under FIFA eligibility rules; some limited exceptions apply. Players may hold more than one non-FIFA nationality.

No.	Pos.	Nation	Player
1	GK	BRA	Tainá
2	DF	BRA	Katiuscia
3	DF	BRA	Tarciane
4	DF	BRA	Giovanna Campiolo
5	MF	BRA	Luana
6	DF	BRA	Juliete
7	MF	BRA	Grazi (captain)
8	MF	BRA	Diany
9	FW	BRA	Jheniffer
10	MF	BRA	Gabi Zanotti
11	MF	COL	Liana Salazar
12	GK	BRA	Letícia
13	DF	BRA	Duda Mineira
14	FW	BRA	Millene
15	FW	BRA	Miriã
16	FW	BRA	Adriana

No.	Pos.	Nation	Player
17	FW	BRA	Victória
18	MF	BRA	Gabi Portilho
19	FW	BRA	Mylena
20	MF	BRA	Mariza
21	DF	BRA	Paulinha
22	GK	BRA	Kemelli
23	GK	BRA	Paty
30	FW	BRA	Jaqueline
37	DF	BRA	Tamires
55	MF	BRA	Gabi Morais
71	DF	BRA	Yasmim
74	DF	BRA	Andressa
77	FW	BRA	Bianca Gomes
97	GK	BRA	Natascha Honegger
99	DF	BRA	Érika
—	FW	BRA	Ellen

== Transfers ==
=== Transfers in ===
#	Position:	Player	Transferred from	Fee	Date	Team	Source
30	FW	(Brazil) Jaqueline	(Brazil) São Paulo	Free transfer (End of contract)	5 January 2022	First team	
20	MF	(Brazil) Mariza	(Brazil) Grêmio	Free transfer (End of contract)	6 January 2022	First team	
14	DF	(Brazil) Andressa	(Brazil) Grêmio	Free transfer (End of contract)	7 January 2022	First team	
11	MF	(Colombia) Liana Salazar	(Colombia) Santa Fe	Free transfer (End of contract)	14 January 2022	First team	
19	FW	(Brazil) Mylena	(China) Shanghai Shengli	Free transfer (End of contract)	17 January 2022	First team	
21	DF	(Brazil) Paulinha	(Portugal) Braga	Free transfer (End of contract)	25 January 2022	First team	
12	GK	(Brazil) Letícia	(Portugal) Benfica	Free transfer (Rescinded contract)	10 February 2022	First team	
5	MF	(Brazil) Luana	(France) Paris Saint-Germain	Free transfer (End of contract)	20 June 2022	First team	
17	FW	(Brazil) Victória	(Spain) Madrid CFF	Free transfer (End of contract)	28 June 2022	First team	
	MF	(Brazil) Lara Dantas	(United States) IMG Academy	Free transfer	29 June 2022	Academy	
55	MF	(Brazil) Gabi Morais	(Portugal) Famalicão	Free transfer (End of contract)	26 July 2022	First team	
14	FW	(Brazil) Millene	(Brazil) Internacional	Free transfer (Rescinded contract)	8 October 2022	First team	

=== Transfers out ===
#	Position	Player	Transferred to	Fee	Date	Team	Source
5	MF	(Brazil) Ingryd	(Brazil) Ferroviária	Free transfer (End of contract)	29 December 2021	First team	
22	DF	(Brazil) Poliana	(Brazil) São José	Free transfer (End of contract)	29 December 2021	First team	
20	MF	(Brazil) Andressinha	(Brazil) Palmeiras	Free transfer (End of contract)	7 January 2022	First team	
3	DF	(Brazil) Pardal	(Brazil) São Paulo	Free transfer (End of contract)	7 January 2022	First team	
17	FW	(Brazil) Victória	(Spain) Madrid CFF	Free transfer (End of contract)	10 January 2022	First team	
13	FW	(Brazil) Cacau	(Brazil) São Paulo	Free transfer (End of contract)	18 January 2022	First team	

=== Loans out ===
#	Position	Player	Loaned to	Date	Loan expires	Team	Source
97	GK	(Brazil) Natascha Honegger	(Brazil) Flamengo/Marinha	21 May 2022	30 September 2022 (Cancelled on 1 September 2022)	First team	

== Squad statistics ==
No.	Pos.	Name	Campeonato Brasileiro		Supercopa do Brasil		Campeonato Paulista		Copa Libertadores		Copa Paulista		Total		Discipline	
No.	Pos.	Name	Apps	Goals	Apps	Goals	Apps	Goals	Apps	Goals	Apps	Goals	Apps	Goals	Yellow card	Red card
1	GK	(Brazil) Tainá	0	0	0	0	3	0	0	0	0	0	3	0	0	0
2	DF	(Brazil) Katiuscia	0	0	3	0	0 (2)	0	0	0	0	0	3 (2)	0	0	0
3	DF	(Brazil) Tarciane	8 (4)	1	3	0	3 (1)	1	3 (1)	0	2	0	19 (6)	2	3	0
4	DF	(Brazil) Giovanna Campiolo	13	0	3	0	1 (2)	0	1 (1)	0	3	1	21 (3)	1	3	0
5	MF	(Brazil) Luana	0	0	0	0	2 (2)	0	2 (2)	0	1 (3)	0	5 (7)	0	0	0
6	DF	(Brazil) Juliete	9 (6)	0	0 (2)	0	6 (2)	2	1 (1)	1	1 (2)	1	18 (13)	4	0	0
7	MF	(Brazil) Grazi	4 (10)	3	0 (1)	0	6 (2)	4	1 (2)	0	1 (3)	1	12 (18)	8	3	1
8	MF	(Brazil) Diany	17 (1)	2	2 (1)	0	7 (1)	0	3 (1)	0	3 (1)	1	32 (5)	3	11	0
9	FW	(Brazil) Jheniffer	11 (5)	7	2 (1)	1	5 (1)	6	2 (1)	0	4	4	24 (8)	18	5	0
10	MF	(Brazil) Gabi Zanotti	11 (2)	6	3	1	0	0	2 (1)	1	0	0	16 (3)	8	1	0
11	MF	(Colombia) Liana Salazar	6 (6)	0	3	1	3 (3)	1	0	0	4	0	16 (9)	2	3	0
12	GK	(Brazil) Letícia	16	0	0	0	4	0	3	0	2	0	25	0	1	0
13	DF	(Brazil) Duda Cordeiro	0 (1)	0	0	0	0	0	0	0	0	0	0 (1)	0	0	0
14	FW	(Brazil) Millene	0	0	0	0	3 (1)	0	0	0	3 (1)	1	6 (2)	1	0	0
15	FW	(Brazil) Miriã	4 (13)	1	0 (1)	0	6	1	0	0	0	0	10 (14)	2	1	0
16	FW	(Brazil) Adriana	16 (1)	9	3	0	3 (2)	1	3 (1)	2	0	0	25 (4)	12	4	0
17	FW	(Brazil) Ellen	0 (3)	0	0 (2)	0	0	0	0	0	0	0	0 (5)	0	0	0
17	FW	(Brazil) Victória	4 (1)	2	0	0	3 (1)	3	4	2	1	1	12 (2)	8	1	0
18	MF	(Brazil) Gabi Portilho	16 (1)	4	2	1	3 (1)	0	4	3	3	1	28 (2)	9	1	0
19	FW	(Brazil) Mylena	1 (11)	1	0	0	4 (3)	1	0	0	0	0	5 (14)	2	1	1
20	MF	(Brazil) Mariza	7 (10)	0	0	0	8 (3)	0	0	0	2 (1)	0	17 (14)	0	2	0
21	DF	(Brazil) Paulinha	16 (1)	0	0 (2)	0	4 (4)	0	0	0	0 (4)	0	20 (11)	0	0	0
22	GK	(Brazil) Kemelli	0	0	2	0	0	0	0	0	0	0	2	0	0	0
23	GK	(Brazil) Paty	5	0	1	0	4	0	1	0	2	0	13	0	0	0
24	DF	(Brazil) Bell	0	0	0	0	3 (1)	0	0	0	0 (1)	0	3 (2)	0	0	0
25	FW	(Brazil) Júlia Brito	0 (2)	0	0	0	4 (1)	0	0	0	0 (3)	0	4 (6)	0	0	0
26	DF	(Brazil) Áhlice	0	0	0	0	0	0	0	0	0	0	0	0	0	0
27	DF	(Brazil) Sabrina	0	0	0	0	0 (2)	0	0	0	0	0	0 (2)	0	0	0
28	GK	(Brazil) Rillary	0	0	0	0	0	0	0	0	0	0	0	0	0	0
30	FW	(Brazil) Jaqueline	18 (3)	5	0 (3)	1	4 (3)	2	3 (1)	0	4	2	29 (10)	10	4	0
31	FW	(Brazil) Miracatu	0	0	0	0	2 (2)	1	0	0	0 (2)	0	2 (4)	1	1	0
33	DF	(Brazil) Amanda Vital	0	0	0	0	2	0	0	0	0	0	2	0	1	0
34	DF	(Brazil) Gabi Medeiros	0	0	0	0	2 (2)	0	0	0	0	0	2 (2)	0	0	0
35	FW	(Brazil) Stefanie	0	0	0	0	0 (1)	0	0	0	0	0	0 (1)	0	0	0
36	DF	(Brazil) Lívia	0	0	0	0	2 (2)	0	0	0	0	0	2 (2)	0	0	0
37	MF	(Brazil) Tamires	15 (1)	1	3	1	2 (1)	0	3 (1)	0	0 (4)	2	23 (7)	4	3	0
38	MF	(Brazil) Cabral	0	0	0	0	0 (2)	0	0	0	0	0	0 (2)	0	0	0
39	FW	(Brazil) Carioca	0	0	0	0	1 (2)	0	0	0	0	0	1 (2)	0	0	0
40	MF	(Brazil) Manu Olivan	0	0	0	0	0 (2)	0	0	0	0	0	0 (2)	0	0	0
55	MF	(Brazil) Gabi Morais	3 (2)	0	0	0	1 (2)	1	2 (1)	0	0	0	6 (5)	1	3	0
71	DF	(Brazil) Yasmim	13 (5)	0	3	0	7	0	2 (1)	0	4	0	29 (6)	0	2	0
74	DF	(Brazil) Andressa	15 (3)	1	0	0	7	1	2	0	4	0	28 (3)	2	4	0
77	FW	(Brazil) Bianca Gomes	3 (6)	1	0 (2)	0	5 (3)	3	0 (2)	1	0	0	8 (13)	5	1	0
97	GK	(Brazil) Natascha Honegger	0	0	0	0	0	0	0	0	0	0	0	0	0	0
99	DF	(Brazil) Érika	0	0	0	0	1 (2)	0	2 (2)	0	0 (2)	0	3 (6)	0	1	0

== Overview ==
Competition	First match	Last match	Starting round	Final position	Record							
Competition	First match	Last match	Starting round	Final position	Pld	W	D	L	GF	GA	GD	Win %
Série A1	5 March 2022	24 September 2022	Matchday 1	Winners	21	14	6	1	47	15	+32	66.67
Supercopa do Brasil	6 February 2022	13 February 2022	Quarter-finals	Winners	3	3	0	0	6	0	+6	100.00
Campeonato Paulista	10 August 2022	23 November 2022	Matchday 1	First stage (5th place)	11	8	0	3	28	9	+19	72.73
Copa Libertadores	13 October 2022	22 October 2022	Group stage	Quarter-finals	4	2	0	2	11	4	+7	50.00
Copa Paulista	30 November 2022	11 December 2022	Semi-finals	Winners	4	4	0	0	15	2	+13	100.00
Total					43	31	6	6	107	30	+77	72.09

Source: Competitions

== Supercopa do Brasil ==
6 February 2022 Quarter-finals	Corinthians	3–0	Palmeiras	São Paulo
10:30 UTC−3	Gabi Portilho 10'; Tamires 34'; Jaqueline 78'	Report		Stadium: Neo Química Arena; Attendance: 13,890; Referee: Daiane Muniz dos Santos
Note: It was played with a 70% stadium capacity due to the COVID-19 pandemic in Brazil.

9 February 2022 Semi-finals	Corinthians	2–0	Real Brasília	Barueri
18:00 UTC−3	Jheniffer 40'; Salazar 51'	Report		Stadium: Arena Barueri (Note: Corinthians played their home match at Arena Barueri, Barueri instead of their regular stadiums Parque São Jorge or Neo Química Arena, São Paulo.); Attendance: Undisclosed; Referee: Adeli Mara Monteiro
Note: It was played with a 70% stadium capacity due to the COVID-19 pandemic in Brazil.

13 February 2022 Final	Corinthians	1–0	Grêmio	São Paulo
10:30 UTC−3	Gabi Zanotti 90+4'	Report		Stadium: Neo Química Arena; Attendance: 19,547; Referee: Edina Alves Batista
Note: It was played with a 70% stadium capacity due to the COVID-19 pandemic in Brazil.

== Campeonato Brasileiro ==
Pos	Team	Pld	W	D	L	GF	GA	GD	Pts	Qualification or relegation
2	São Paulo	15	11	2	2	30	13	+17	35	Advance to Quarter-finals
3	Internacional	15	10	3	2	27	13	+14	33	Advance to Quarter-finals
4	Corinthians	15	9	5	1	33	12	+21	32	Advance to Quarter-finals
5	Real Brasília	15	8	2	5	24	23	+1	26	Advance to Quarter-finals
6	Flamengo/Marinha	15	7	4	4	25	17	+8	25	Advance to Quarter-finals

Source: CBF

=== First stage ===
5 March 2022 Match 1	Corinthians	2–1	Red Bull Bragantino	São Paulo
14:00 UTC−3	Débora 44' (o.g.); Bianca Gomes 45+4'	Report	Luana Lima 15'	Stadium: Parque São Jorge; Attendance: Undisclosed; Referee: Paulo Cesar Francisco
Note: No tickets were sold for this match due to infrastructure repairs at the stadium. Corinthians offered a few promotional tickets in a marketing action.

14 March 2022 Match 2	Atlético Mineiro	1–1	Corinthians	Belo Horizonte
20:00 UTC−3	Leidi 51'	Report	Grazi 90+5'	Stadium: Arena Independência; Attendance: 3,431; Referee: Francielly Fernanda Lima de Castro

18 March 2022 Match 3	Corinthians	1–0	Cruzeiro	São Paulo
20:00 UTC−3	Miriã 55'	Report		Stadium: Estádio do Canindé (Note: Corinthians played their home match at Estádio do Canindé, São Paulo instead of their regular stadiums Parque São Jorge or Neo Química Arena, São Paulo.); Attendance: 1,296; Referee: José Guilherme Almeida e Souza

27 March 2022 Match 4	Santos	1–2	Corinthians	Santos
11:00 UTC−3	Cristiane 74'	Report	Brena 25' (o.g.); Mylena 90'	Stadium: Vila Belmiro; Attendance: 1,721; Referee: Adeli Mara Monteiro

3 April 2022 Match 5	Corinthians	1–1	São Paulo	São Paulo
11:00 UTC−3	Gabi Portilho 82'	Report	Yasmim 13' (o.g.)	Stadium: Parque São Jorge; Attendance: 1,326; Referee: João Vitor Gobi
Note: The match was originally scheduled for 2 April, but it was postponed due to broadcast requests.

17 April 2022 Match 6	Corinthians	3–0	Real Brasília	São Paulo
15:00 UTC−3	Jaqueline 50'; Gabi Zanotti 56'; Adriana 66' (pen.)	Report		Stadium: Parque São Jorge; Attendance: 574; Referee: Daiane Muniz dos Santos

25 April 2022 Match 7	São José	0–5	Corinthians	São José dos Campos
16:00 UTC−3		Report	Gabi Zanotti 41', 42', 65'; Adriana 61'; Jheniffer 73'	Stadium: Estádio Martins Pereira; Attendance: Undisclosed; Referee: José Guilherme Almeida e Souza

1 May 2022 Match 8	Corinthians	2–2	Ferroviária	São Paulo
11:00 UTC−3	Gabi Zanotti 63'; Adriana 90+1'	Report	Ingryd 12'; Aline Gomes 90+9'	Stadium: Parque São Jorge; Attendance: 1,954; Referee: Pietro Dimitrof Stefanelli
Note: The match was originally scheduled for 30 April, but it was postponed due to broadcast requests.

15 May 2022 Match 9	CRESSPOM	0–3	Corinthians	Ceilândia
15:00 UTC−3		Report	Bruna Amarante 23' (o.g.); Andressa 45+5'; Gabi Portilho 48'	Stadium: Estádio Maria de Lourdes Abadia; Attendance: Undisclosed; Referee: Maguielson Lima Barbosa

28 May 2022 Match 10	Corinthians	4–0	Avaí Kindermann	São Paulo
14:00 UTC−3	Adriana 18'; Gabi Portilho 21'; Diany 42'; Tarciane 76'	Report		Stadium: Parque São Jorge; Attendance: 918; Referee: Fernanda dos Santos Ignacio de Souza

4 June 2022 Match 11	Palmeiras	2–0	Corinthians	São Paulo
14:00 UTC−3	Duda Santos 28', 85'	Report		Stadium: Allianz Parque; Attendance: 5,947; Referee: Adeli Mara Monteiro

11 June 2022 Match 12	Flamengo/Marinha	1–2	Corinthians	Rio de Janeiro
14:00 UTC−3	Leidiane 36'	Report	Adriana 2'; Grazi 90+2'	Stadium: Estádio da Gávea (Note: Flamengo was expected to play their home match at Estádio Luso Brasileiro, Rio de Janeiro but opted to play at their other regular stadium Estádio da Gávea, Rio de Janeiro instead.); Attendance: 0 Referee: Felipe da Silva Gonçalves Paludo

18 June 2022 Match 13	Corinthians	1–1	Internacional	São Paulo
14:00 UTC−3	Jheniffer 40'	Report	Millene 39' (pen.)	Stadium: Parque São Jorge; Attendance: 1,089; Referee: Adriano de Assis Miranda

3 August 2022 Match 14	Corinthians	4–0	ESMAC	São Paulo
20:00 UTC−3	Jaqueline 3', 60'; Grazi 17'; Jheniffer 41'	Report		Stadium: Parque São Jorge; Attendance: 736; Referee: José Guilherme Almeida e Souza

7 August 2022 Match 15	Grêmio	2–2	Corinthians	Gravataí
11:00 UTC−3	Dani Barão 45+3'; Laís 86'	Report	Gabi Zanotti 25'; Adriana 69'	Stadium: Estádio Antônio Vieira Ramos; Attendance: Undisclosed; Referee: Andressa Hartmann

=== Knockout stages ===
14 August 2022 Quarter-finals	Real Brasília	0–2	Corinthians	Brasília
11:00 UTC−3		Report	Adriana 22'; Victória 55' (pen.)	Stadium: Arena BRB Mané Garrincha (Note: Real Brasília played their home match at Arena BRB Mané Garrincha, Brasília instead of their regular stadium Estádio Ciro Machado do Espírito Santo, Brasília.); Attendance: 1,101; Referee: Michelle Peixoto Safatle

21 August 2022 Quarter-finals	Corinthians	1–0 (3–0 agg.)	Real Brasília	São Paulo
10:30 UTC−3	Tamires 60'	Report		Stadium: Neo Química Arena; Attendance: 9,854; Referee: Andreza Helena de Siqueira

27 August 2022 Semi-finals	Corinthians	2–1	Palmeiras	São Paulo
14:00 UTC−3	Adriana 2'; Jaqueline 47'	Report	Camilinha 42'	Stadium: Neo Química Arena; Attendance: 13,314; Referee: Deborah Cecilia Cruz Correia

10 September 2022 Semi-finals	Palmeiras	0–4 (1–6 agg.)	Corinthians	São Paulo
14:00 UTC−3		Report	Adriana 9' (pen.); Gabi Portilho 45'; Jheniffer 50', 61'	Stadium: Allianz Parque; Attendance: 11,450; Referee: Edina Alves Batista

18 September 2022 Finals	Internacional	1–1	Corinthians	Porto Alegre
11:00 UTC−3	Millene 32'	Report	Jheniffer 58'	Stadium: Estádio Beira-Rio; Attendance: 36,330; Referee: Deborah Cecilia Cruz Correia

24 September 2022 Finals	Corinthians	4–1 (5–2 agg.)	Internacional	São Paulo
14:00 UTC−3	Jaqueline 23'; Diany 45+1'; Victória 48'; Jheniffer 90+2'	Report	Sorriso 14'	Stadium: Neo Química Arena; Attendance: 41,070; Referee: Charly Wendy Straub Deretti
Note: The attendance was a South American record for a women's club match.

== Campeonato Paulista ==
=== First stage ===
10 August 2022 Match 1	São Bernardo	1–6	Corinthians	Santo André
15:00 UTC−3	Tuca 61'	Report	Jheniffer 5', 42'; Mylena 52'; Victória 73'; Grazi 77'; Bianca Gomes 85'	Stadium: Estádio Bruno José Daniel (Note: São Bernardo played their home match at Estádio Bruno José Daniel, Santo André instead of their regular stadium Estádio Municipal Giglio Portugal Pichinin, São Bernardo do Campo.); Attendance: Undisclosed; Referee: Lucas Canetto Bellote

18 August 2022 Match 2	Corinthians	6–0	Portuguesa	São Paulo
17:00 UTC−3	Bianca Gomes 15'; Andressa 51'; Grazi 58'; Miriã 62'; Gabi Morais 79'; Jheniffer 90+2'	Report		Stadium: Parque São Jorge; Attendance: 305; Referee: Edina Alves Batista

24 August 2022 Match 3	Corinthians	1–2	Ferroviária	Mogi das Cruzes
19:30 UTC−3	Miracatu 46'	Report	Suzane Pires 31'; Laryh 64'	Stadium: Estádio Municipal Francisco Ribeiro Nogueira (Note: Corinthians played their home match at Estádio Municipal Francisco Ribeiro Nogueira, Mogi das Cruzes instead of Parque São Jorge, São Paulo due to maintenance in the stadium's light towers.); Attendance: 334; Referee: Danilo da Silva
Note: The match was originally scheduled for 25 August, but it was rescheduled due to table adjustments in the Campeonato Brasileiro de Futebol Feminino Série A1.

7 September 2022 Match 4	São Paulo	3–0	Corinthians	Barueri
16:45 UTC−3	Vitória Yaya 1'; Naná 42'; Cacau 84'	Report		Stadium: Arena Barueri (Note: São Paulo played their home match at Arena Barueri, Barueri instead of their regular stadiums CFA de Cotia, Cotia or Estádio do Morumbi, São Paulo.); Attendance: Undisclosed; Referee: Daiane Muniz dos Santos

15 September 2022 Match 5	Pinda	0–2	Corinthians	Caieiras
15:00 UTC−3		Report	Bianca Gomes 18'; Grazi 47'	Stadium: Estádio Municipal Carlos Ferracini (Note: Pinda played their home match at Estádio Municipal Carlos Ferracini, Caieiras instead of their regular stadium Estádio Doutor Antônio Pinheiro Júnior, Pindamonhangaba.); Attendance: Undisclosed; Referee: Gustavo Holanda Souza

21 September 2022 Match 6	Corinthians	0–2	Palmeiras	Mogi das Cruzes
15:00 UTC−3		Report	Poliana 8'; Paty 82' (o.g.)	Stadium: Estádio Municipal Francisco Ribeiro Nogueira (Note: Corinthians played their home match at Estádio Municipal Francisco Ribeiro Nogueira, Mogi das Cruzes instead of Parque São Jorge, São Paulo due to a men's U17 Campeonato Brasileiro match taking place on the same date at the stadium.); Attendance: 493; Referee: Fabiano Monteiro dos Santos

27 September 2022 Match 7	Corinthians	2–0	São José	São Paulo
18:30 UTC−3	Juliete 37', 72'	Report		Stadium: Parque São Jorge; Attendance: Undisclosed; Referee: Guilherme Francisco Maciel da Silva e Rosário
Note: In half time, the match was suspended due to heavy rain. It was resumed the next day at 15:00 UTC−3

3 November 2022 Match 8	Realidade Jovem	1–4	Corinthians	São José do Rio Preto
15:00 UTC−3	Mi 65'	Report	Jheniffer 11'; Jaqueline 25'; Adriana 36' (pen.); Salazar 90' (pen.)	Stadium: Estádio João Mendes Athayde; Attendance: Undisclosed; Referee: Márcio Mattos dos Santos

16 November 2022 Match 9	Corinthians	1–0	Santos	São Paulo
19:30 UTC−3	Victória 25'	Report		Stadium: Neo Química Arena; Attendance: 8,719; Referee: Edina Alves Batista
Note: The match was originally scheduled for 17 November, but it was rescheduled due to table adjustments related to the beginning of the 2022 FIFA World Cup.

19 November 2022 Match 10	Red Bull Bragantino	0–1	Corinthians	Bragança Paulista
16:30 UTC−3		Report	Victória 63'	Stadium: Estádio Nabi Abi Chedid; Attendance: Undisclosed; Referee: Flávio Roberto Mineiro Ribeiro
Note: The match was originally scheduled for 20 November, but it was rescheduled due to table adjustments related to the beginning of the 2022 FIFA World Cup.

23 November 2022 Match 11	Corinthians	5–0	Taubaté	São Paulo
19:00 UTC−3	Jheniffer 20', 38'; Grazi 22'; Jaqueline 36'; Tarciane 90+5' (pen.)	Report		Stadium: Parque São Jorge; Attendance: Undisclosed; Referee: Daiane Muniz dos Santos

=== Copa Paulista ===
After finishing in fifth place, Corinthians participated in the Copa Paulista. The competition featured the four teams that ended the Campeonato Paulista between 5th and 8th place.

30 November 2022 Semi-finals	São Bernardo	0–4	Corinthians	São Bernardo do Campo
15:00 UTC−3		Report	Jheniffer 3'; Victória 30'; Jaqueline 58'; Grazi 90+3'	Stadium: Estádio Municipal Giglio Portugal Pichinin; Attendance: Undisclosed; Referee: Guilherme Francisco Maciel da Silva e Rosário

4 December 2022 Semi-finals	Corinthians	6–0 (10–0 agg.)	São Bernardo	São Paulo
16:00 UTC−3	Juliete 3'; Gabi Portilho 17'; Jheniffer 28'; Diany 68'; Tamires 85'; Millene 90'	Report		Stadium: Parque São Jorge; Attendance: Undisclosed; Referee: Pablo Rodrigo Soares de Olibeira

8 December 2022 Finals	Red Bull Bragantino	1–3	Corinthians	Bragança Paulista
15:00 UTC−3	Ariel 27'	Report	Jaqueline 38'; Campiolo 61'; Jheniffer 85'	Stadium: Estádio Nabi Abi Chedid; Attendance: Undisclosed; Referee: Marianna Nanni Batalha

11 December 2022 Finals	Corinthians	2–1 (5–2 agg.)	Red Bull Bragantino	Barueri
21:30 UTC−3	Jheniffer 85'; Tamires 90+1'	Report	Mylena 87'	Stadium: Arena Barueri (Note: Corinthians played their home match at Arena Barueri, Barueri instead of their regular stadiums Parque São Jorge or Neo Química Arena, São Paulo.); Attendance: Undisclosed; Referee: João Vitor Gobi

== Copa Libertadores ==
=== Group stage ===
Pos	Team	Pld	W	D	L	GF	GA	GD	Pts	Qualification
1	(Colombia) Deportivo Cali	3	3	0	0	14	3	+11	9	Quarter-finals
2	(Brazil) Corinthians	3	2	0	1	10	2	+8	6	Quarter-finals
3	(Paraguay) Olimpia	3	1	0	2	3	6	−3	3	
4	(Bolivia) Always Ready	3	0	0	3	1	17	−16	0	

Updated to match(es) played on 16 October 2022. Source: CONMEBOL

13 October 2022 Match 1	Corinthians (Brazil)	1–2	(Colombia) Deportivo Cali	Quito, Ecuador
17:15 UTC−5	Victória 24'	Report	Guerra 42'; Ariza 45+1'	Stadium: Estadio Gonzalo Pozo Ripalda; Attendance: Undisclosed; Referee: Emikar Calderas (Venezuela)

16 October 2022 Match 2	Always Ready (Bolivia)	0–5	(Brazil) Corinthians	Quito, Ecuador
17:15 UTC−5		Report	Gabi Portilho 13', 19'; Adriana 27'; Victória 31' (pen.); Juliete 57'	Stadium: Estadio Gonzalo Pozo Ripalda; Attendance: Undisclosed; Referee: Marcelly Zambrano (Ecuador)

19 October 2022 Match 3	Corinthians (Brazil)	4–0	(Paraguay) Olimpia	Quito, Ecuador
17:15 UTC−5	Vázquez 25' (o.g.); Gabi Portilho 73'; Bianca Gomes 88'; Gabi Zanotti 90+1'	Report		Stadium: Estadio Gonzalo Pozo Ripalda; Attendance: Undisclosed; Referee: Laura Fortunato (Argentina)

=== Knockout stages ===
22 October 2022 Quarter-finals	Boca Juniors (Argentina)	2–1	(Brazil) Corinthians	Quito, Ecuador
14:30 UTC−5	Núñez 23'; Palomar 75'	Report	Adriana 34'	Stadium: Estadio Rodrigo Paz Delgado; Attendance: Undisclosed; Referee: Emikar Calderas (Venezuela)

== See also ==
- List of Sport Club Corinthians Paulista (women) seasons
