= List of SC Corinthians Paulista (women) seasons =

This is a list of seasons played by Sport Club Corinthians Paulista (women), the women's section of football club Sport Club Corinthians Paulista. It competes in the Campeonato Brasileiro de Futebol Feminino Série A1 from the Parque São Jorge in São Paulo.

The club's first spell took place between 1997 and 2009, as the team irregularly played competitions and friendlies during that period. They decided to resume activities in 2015, starting a partnership with Grêmio Osasco Audax Esporte Clube. Corinthians/Audax made its debut in 2016 and played together until 2018, when Corinthians decided to keep a team of their own.

== Summary ==
Season	League									Cup	Supercup	Paulista	Libertadores	FIFA Champions Cup	Top scorer	
Season	Div	Pos	Pld	W	D	L	GF	GA	Pts	Cup	Supercup	Paulista	Libertadores	FIFA Champions Cup	Name(s)	Goal
1997												Third place				
1998												—				
1999												—				
2000												—				
2001												Third place				
2002																
2003																
2004												—				
2005												—				
2006												—				
2007										—		—				
2008										Round of 16		Fourth place				
2009										—		Fourth place	—			
2010 – 2015	Team was deactivated															
2016	A	5th	10	5	3	2	23	9	18	Champion		Third place	—		(Brazil) Gabi Nunes	19
2017	A1	2nd	20	15	1	4	54	13	46			Third place	Champion		(Brazil) Byanca Brasil	28
2018	A1	1st	20	15	4	1	47	12	49			Runner-up	— (Note: After their partnership ended, Audax earned the 2018 spot as current champions.)		(Brazil) Adriana	26
2019	A1	2nd	21	18	2	1	62	8	56			Champion	Champion		(Brazil) Millene	32
2020	A1	1st	21	18	2	1	57	10	56			Champion	Third place		(Brazil) Gabi Nunes (Brazil) Giovanna Crivelari (Brazil) Victória	12
2021	A1	1st	21	18	2	1	64	17	56			Champion	Champion		(Brazil) Victória	26
2022	A1	1st	21	14	6	1	47	15	48		Champion	Fifth place (Note: Corinthians won the Copa Paulista featuring the teams that finished between 5th and 8th place.)	Quarter-finals		(Brazil) Jheniffer	18
2023	A1	1st	21	17	2	2	66	12	53		Champion	Champion	Champion		(Brazil) Victória	23
2024	A1	1st	21	17	2	2	51	22	53		Champion	Runner-up	Champion		(Brazil) Victória	17
2025	A1	1st	21	14	6	1	57	17	48	Quarter-finals	Runner-up	Runner-up	Champion		(Brazil) Gabi Zanotti	18
