= 2023 Campeonato Brasileiro de Futebol Feminino Série A1 =

Campeonato Brasileiro de Futebol Feminino Série A1
- Season: 2023
- Dates: 24 February – 10 September 2023
- Champions: Corinthians (5th title)
- Relegated: Athletico Paranaense; Bahia; Ceará; Real Ariquemes
- Copa Libertadores: Corinthians (via Copa Libertadores); Ferroviária; Santos
- Matches: 134
- Goals: 455 (3.4 per match)
- Top goalscorer: Amanda Gutierres (14 goals)
- Biggest home win: Corinthians 14–0 Ceará; Group stage, R1, 25 February
- Biggest away win: Real Ariquemes 0–8 Ferroviária; Group stage, R5, 26 March
- Highest scoring: 14 goals Corinthians 14–0 Ceará; Group stage, R1, 25 February

The 2023 Campeonato Brasileiro Feminino A-1 (officially the Brasileirão Feminino Neoenergia 2023 for sponsorship reasons) was the 11th season of the Campeonato Brasileiro de Futebol Feminino Série A1, the top level of women's football in Brazil, and the 7th edition in a Série A1 since its establishment in 2016. The tournament was organized by the Brazilian Football Confederation (CBF). It started on 24 February and ended on 10 September 2023.

Sixteen teams competed in the league – the top twelve teams from the previous season, as well as four teams promoted from the 2022 Série A2 (Athletico Paranaense, Bahia, Ceará and Real Ariquemes)

In the 15th round of Group A (12 June 2023), Real Ariquemes players refused to play their home match against Santos in protest over unpaid wages. Santos was awarded a 3–0 win by forfeit.

In the finals, the defending champions Corinthians won their 5th title after defeating Ferroviária 2–1 on aggregate.

Athletico Paranaense, Bahia, Ceará and Real Ariquemes were relegated to the 2024 Série A2.

== Format ==
In the group stage, each team played once against the other fifteen teams. Top eight teams qualified for the final stages. Quarter-finals, semi-finals and finals were played on a home-and-away two-legged basis.

== Teams ==
Location of teams in 2023 Série A1 outside the state of São Paulo (in red).
Location of teams in 2023 Série A1 within the state of São Paulo.

Pos.	Relegated from 2022 Série A1
13	São José
14	ESMAC
15	Red Bull Bragantino
16	CRESSPOM

Pos.	Promoted from 2022 Série A2
1	Ceará
2	Athletico Paranaense
3	Real Ariquemes
4	Bahia

=== Number of teams by state ===
Number of teams	State	Team(s)
5	São Paulo	Corinthians, Ferroviária, Palmeiras, Santos and São Paulo
2	Minas Gerais	Atlético Mineiro and Cruzeiro
2	Rio Grande do Sul	Grêmio and Internacional
1	Bahia	Bahia
1	Ceará	Ceará
1	Distrito Federal	Real Brasília
1	Paraná	Athletico Paranaense
1	Rio de Janeiro	Flamengo/Marinha
1	Rondônia	Real Ariquemes
1	Santa Catarina	Avaí

== Stadiums and locations ==
Team	Location	Stadium	Capacity
(Paraná (state)) Athletico Paranaense	Curitiba	CT do Caju	3,000
(Minas Gerais) Atlético Mineiro	Belo Horizonte	SESC Alterosas	2,000
(Santa Catarina (state)) Avaí	Caçador	Salézio Kindermann	6,500
Bahia	Salvador	CT Evaristo de Macedo (Camaçari)	1,000
Ceará	Fortaleza	CT Cidade Vozão (Itaitinga)	4,000
(São Paulo (state)) Corinthians	São Paulo	Parque São Jorge	18,500
(Minas Gerais) Cruzeiro	Belo Horizonte	SESC Alterosas	2,000
(São Paulo (state)) Ferroviária	Araraquara	Fonte Luminosa	21,441
(Rio de Janeiro (state)) Flamengo/Marinha	Rio de Janeiro	Luso Brasileiro	4,697
(Rio Grande do Sul) Grêmio	Porto Alegre	Antônio Vieira Ramos (Gravataí)	4,700
(Rio Grande do Sul) Internacional	Porto Alegre	SESC Protásio Alves	2,800
(São Paulo (state)) Palmeiras	São Paulo	Allianz Parque	43,713
(Rondônia) Real Ariquemes	Ariquemes	Gentil Valério	2,500
(Federal District (Brazil)) Real Brasília	Brasília	Ciro Machado do Espírito Santo	1,500
(São Paulo (state)) Santos	Santos	Urbano Caldeira	21,732
(São Paulo (state)) São Paulo	São Paulo	Marcelo Portugal Gouvêa (Cotia)	2,000

== Personnel and kits ==
Team	Head coach	Captain	Kit manufacturer	Shirt main sponsor
Athletico Paranaense	(Brazil) Brenno Basso	(Brazil) Evellyn Marques	Umbro	
Atlético Mineiro	(Brazil) Vantressa Ferreira	(Brazil) Ludmila Barbosa	Adidas	Banco BMG
Avaí	(Brazil) Carine Bosetti	(Paraguay) Limpia Fretes	Umbro	PixBet
Bahia	(Brazil) Igor Morena	(Brazil) Thayná	Esquadrão (club manufactured kit)	
Ceará	(Brazil) David Lopes	(Brazil) Karen Rocha	Vozão (club manufactured kit)	EstrelaBet
Corinthians	(Brazil) Arthur Elias	(Brazil) Tamires	Nike	
Cruzeiro	(Brazil) Felipe Freitas	(Brazil) Carol Baiana	Adidas	Gerdau
Ferroviária	(Brazil) Jéssica de Lima	(Brazil) Patrícia Sochor	Lupo Sport	Estrella Galicia; Galera.bet
Flamengo/Marinha	(Portugal) Luís Andrade	(Brazil) Darlene	Adidas	Banco BRB
Grêmio	(Brazil) Felipe Endres	(Brazil) Tuani	Umbro	Banrisul
Internacional	(Brazil) Maurício Salgado	(Brazil) Bruna Benites	Adidas	EstrelaBet
Palmeiras	(Brazil) Ricardo Belli	(Brazil) Bia Zaneratto	Puma	Betfair
Real Ariquemes	(Brazil) Paulo Eduardo	(Brazil) Gabi Lira	Criare Sports	CrediSIS CrediAri
Real Brasília	(Brazil) Camilla Orlando	(Brazil) Isabela Melo	Tolledo Sports	Banco BRB
Santos	(Brazil) Kleiton Lima	(Brazil) Brena	Umbro	Blaze.com
São Paulo	(Brazil) Thiago Viana	(Brazil) Pardal	Adidas	Sportsbet.io

=== Foreign players ===
The clubs can have a maximum of seven foreign players in their Campeonato Brasileiro squads per match, but there is no limit of foreigners in the clubs' squads.

Club	Player 1	Player 2	Player 3	Player 4	Player 5	Player 6	Player 7
Athletico Paranaense	(Venezuela) Hilary Vergara						
Atlético Mineiro	(Uruguay) Karol Bermúdez	(Venezuela) Dayana Rodríguez	(Uruguay) Luciana Gómez	(Colombia) Jorelyn Carabalí	(Colombia) Ingrid Guerra	(Colombia) Manuela Paví	
Avaí	(Uruguay) Ximena Velazco	(Paraguay) Verónica Riveros	(Paraguay) Limpia Fretes	(Paraguay) Lule González	(Colombia) Catalina Pérez		
Bahia	(Chile) Yenny Acuña						
Ceará	(Austria) Elena Kössler						
Corinthians							
Cruzeiro	(Paraguay) Kelly Arrieta	(Colombia) Kelly Caicedo					
Ferroviária	(Venezuela) Joemar Guarecuco	(Colombia) Yisela Cuesta					
Flamengo/Marinha	(Argentina) Sole Jaimes	(Argentina) Agustina Barroso					
Grêmio	(Colombia) Jessica Peña	(Colombia) Mónica Ramos	(Argentina) Agostina Holzheier				
Internacional	(Paraguay) Fabiola Sandoval	(Paraguay) Fany Gauto	(Uruguay) Belén Aquino				
Palmeiras	(Paraguay) Alicia Bobadilla	(Colombia) Kate Tapia	(Argentina) Lorena Benítez	(Paraguay) Ramona Martínez	(Paraguay) Rosa Miño	(Argentina) Yamila Rodríguez	(Chile) Rosario Balmaceda
Real Ariquemes	(Paraguay) Graciela Martínez						
Real Brasília	(Venezuela) Natasha Rosas	(Venezuela) Petra Cabrera	(Colombia) Lorena Bedoya	(Colombia) Lady Andrade			
Santos	(United States) Jourdan Ziff	(Panama) Luciana Ortega	(Philippines) Reina Bonta				
São Paulo							

==== Players holding Brazilian dual nationality ====
They do not take foreign slot.

- (Portugal) Suzane Pires (Ferroviária)

== Group stage ==
In the group stage, each team played on a single round-robin tournament. The top eight teams advanced to the quarter-finals of the knockout stages. The teams were ranked according to points (3 points for a win, 1 point for a draw, and 0 points for a loss). If tied on points, the following criteria would be used to determine the ranking: 1. Wins; 2. Goal difference; 3. Goals scored; 4. Fewest red cards; 5. Fewest yellow cards; 6. Draw in the headquarters of the Brazilian Football Confederation (Regulations Article 15).

=== Group A ===
Pos	Team	Pld	W	D	L	GF	GA	GD	Pts	Qualification or relegation
1	Corinthians	15	12	1	2	53	8	+45	37	Advance to Quarter-finals
2	Palmeiras	15	11	2	2	48	14	+34	35	Advance to Quarter-finals
3	Ferroviária	15	11	1	3	38	16	+22	34	Advance to Quarter-finals
4	Santos	15	10	2	3	32	10	+22	32	Advance to Quarter-finals
5	Flamengo/Marinha	15	10	1	4	23	14	+9	31	Advance to Quarter-finals
6	Internacional	15	9	1	5	25	16	+9	28	Advance to Quarter-finals
7	São Paulo	15	7	4	4	27	13	+14	25	Advance to Quarter-finals
8	Cruzeiro	15	6	4	5	36	26	+10	22	Advance to Quarter-finals
9	Grêmio	15	6	1	8	16	22	−6	19	
10	Avaí	15	6	1	8	25	33	−8	19	
11	Real Brasília	15	5	2	8	16	24	−8	17	
12	Atlético Mineiro	15	5	1	9	17	23	−6	16	
13	Bahia (R)	15	4	1	10	25	33	−8	13	Relegation to Campeonato Brasileiro Série A2
14	Athletico Paranaense (R)	15	3	1	11	15	33	−18	10	Relegation to Campeonato Brasileiro Série A2
15	Real Ariquemes (R)	15	3	0	12	10	54	−44	9	Relegation to Campeonato Brasileiro Série A2
16	Ceará (R)	15	0	1	14	7	74	−67	1	Relegation to Campeonato Brasileiro Série A2

Source: CBF
(R) Relegated

=== Results ===
Home \ Away	ATH	ATL	AVA	BAH	CEA	COR	CRU	FER	FLA	GRE	INT	PAL	RAR	RBR	SAN	SPO
Athletico Paranaense				2–1			0–5	1–4		0–2		1–2	4–1		1–1	
Atlético Mineiro	2–1			0–1				2–4			0–2		3–0	1–0		1–0
Avaí	4–0	3–2				1–0				2–1		2–2		2–5		1–2
Bahia			2–4		10–0	1–5	2–3			3–2			1–3	2–1		
Ceará	2–4	1–1	1–2				0–7		0–6						1–6	0–2
Corinthians	1–0	1–0			14–0		7–1		4–0	4–0		3–2			1–0	
Cruzeiro		2–3	3–1					1–1	3–1	1–1			3–0		2–3	
Ferroviária			3–0	3–0	2–0	1–4			1–2		2–1			2–0		1–0
Flamengo/Marinha	1–0	1–0	3–0	1–0							2–1	0–1		2–0		1–1
Grêmio		2–1			3–0			1–4	0–1		1–0		1–0		1–0	0–3
Internacional	2–1		3–2	3–0	2–1	2–0	1–0					1–2		2–0		
Palmeiras		3–1		3–0	11–0		3–2	4–1		2–1			9–0			0–1
Real Ariquemes			2–1		2–0	0–6		0–8	0–2		2–3				0–3	
Real Brasília	2–0				2–1	0–0	1–1			1–0		0–3	3–0		0–4	
Santos		2–0	4–0	2–1				0–1	3–0		2–1	1–1				
São Paulo	3–0			1–1		0–3	2–2				1–1		7–0	4–1	0–1	

Source: CBF
Legend: Blue = home team win; Yellow = draw; Red = away team win.

== Final stages ==
Starting from the quarter-finals, the teams played a single-elimination tournament with the following rules:

- Quarter-finals, semi-finals and finals were played on a home-and-away two-legged basis, with the higher-seeded team hosting the second leg.
  - If tied on aggregate, the penalty shoot-out would be used to determine the winners (Regulations Article 16).
- Extra time would not be played and away goals rule would not be used in final stages.

Starting from the semi-finals, the teams were seeded according to their performance in the tournament. The teams were ranked according to overall points. If tied on overall points, the following criteria would be used to determine the ranking: 1. Overall wins; 2. Overall goal difference; 3. Draw in the headquarters of the Brazilian Football Confederation (Regulations Article 20).

=== Bracket ===
Quarter-finals
(São Paulo (state)) São Paulo	1	3	4
(São Paulo (state)) Palmeiras	1	1	2
(Rio Grande do Sul) Internacional	0	0	0
(São Paulo (state)) Ferroviária	1	3	4
(Rio de Janeiro (state)) Flamengo/Marinha	1	1	2
(São Paulo (state)) Santos	3	4	7
(Minas Gerais) Cruzeiro	1	2	3
(São Paulo (state)) Corinthians	2	4	6

Semi-finals
(São Paulo (state)) São Paulo	1	2	3 (1)
(São Paulo (state)) Ferroviária (p)	3	0	3 (3)
(São Paulo (state)) Santos	0	0	0
(São Paulo (state)) Corinthians	3	2	5

Finals
(São Paulo (state)) Ferroviária	0	1	1
(São Paulo (state)) Corinthians	0	2	2

=== Quarter-finals ===
Team 1	Agg.	Team 2	1st leg	2nd leg
Cruzeiro (Minas Gerais)	3–6	(São Paulo (state)) Corinthians	1–2	2–4
São Paulo (São Paulo (state))	4–2	(São Paulo (state)) Palmeiras	1–1	3–1
Internacional (Rio Grande do Sul)	0–4	(São Paulo (state)) Ferroviária	0–1	0–3
Flamengo/Marinha (Rio de Janeiro (state))	2–7	(São Paulo (state)) Santos	1–3	1–4

==== Group B ====
19 June 2023
20:00

Cruzeiro (Minas Gerais)	1–2	(São Paulo (state)) Corinthians
Marília 44'	Report	Gabi Zanotti 30'; Victória 90+4' (pen.)

Estádio Soares de Azevedo, Muriaé
Referee: Thayslane de Melo Costa (Sergipe)

26 June 2023
18:30

Corinthians (São Paulo (state))	4–2	(Minas Gerais) Cruzeiro
Jheniffer 11'; Victória 22'; Duda Sampaio 48'; Tamires 62'	Report	Isabela Fernandes 31'; Byanca Brasil 57'

Estádio Parque São Jorge, São Paulo
Referee: Charly Wendy Straub Deretti (Santa Catarina)

Corinthians won 6–3 on aggregate and advanced to the semi-finals.

==== Group C ====
18 June 2023
16:00

São Paulo (São Paulo (state))	1–1	(São Paulo (state)) Palmeiras
Maressa 89'	Report	Letícia Moreno 27'

Estádio Bruno José Daniel, Santo André
Referee: Marianna Nanni Batalha (São Paulo)

25 June 2023
10:00

Palmeiras (São Paulo (state))	1–3	(São Paulo (state)) São Paulo
Amanda Gutierres 11'	Report	Rafa Mineira 22'; Ana Alice 48'; Micaelly 67'

Allianz Parque, São Paulo
Referee: Edina Alves Batista (São Paulo)

São Paulo won 4–2 on aggregate and advanced to the semi-finals.

==== Group D ====
18 June 2023
16:00

Internacional (Rio Grande do Sul)	0–1	(São Paulo (state)) Ferroviária
	Report	Luana Sartório 82'

Estádio Centenário, Caxias do Sul
Referee: Deborah Cecilia Cruz Correia (Pernambuco)

25 June 2023
10:00

Ferroviária (São Paulo (state))	3–0	(Rio Grande do Sul) Internacional
Aline Gomes 36'; Suzane Pires 89'; Cuesta 90+3'	Report

Fonte Luminosa, Araraquara
Referee: Rejane Caetano da Silva (Rio de Janeiro)

Ferroviária won 4–0 on aggregate and advanced to the semi-finals.

==== Group E ====
18 June 2023
16:00

Flamengo/Marinha (Rio de Janeiro (state))	1–3	(São Paulo (state)) Santos
Leidi 39'	Report	Vitória Yaya 3'; Cristiane 72'; Thaisinha 78'

Estádio Raulino de Oliveira, Volta Redonda
Referee: Andreza Helena de Siqueira (Minas Gerais)

25 June 2023
10:00

Santos (São Paulo (state))	4–1	(Rio de Janeiro (state)) Flamengo/Marinha
Ketlen 21', 90'; Bia Menezes 54'; Camila 90+3'	Report	Leidi 17'

Estádio Urbano Caldeira, Santos
Referee: Deborah Cecilia Cruz Correia (Pernambuco)

Santos won 7–2 on aggregate and advanced to the semi-finals.

=== Semi-finals ===
Pos	Team	Pld	W	D	L	GF	GA	GD	Pts	Host
1	(São Paulo (state)) Corinthians	17	14	1	2	59	11	+48	43	Second leg
3	(São Paulo (state)) Santos	17	12	2	3	39	12	+27	38	First leg
2	(São Paulo (state)) Ferroviária	17	13	1	3	42	16	+26	40	Second leg
4	(São Paulo (state)) São Paulo	17	8	5	4	31	15	+16	29	First leg

Source: CBF

Team 1	Agg.	Team 2	1st leg	2nd leg
Santos (São Paulo (state))	0–5	(São Paulo (state)) Corinthians	0–3	0–2
São Paulo (São Paulo (state))	3–3 (1–3 p)	(São Paulo (state)) Ferroviária	1–3	2–0

==== Group F ====
27 August 2023
10:30

Santos (São Paulo (state))	0–3	(São Paulo (state)) Corinthians
	Report	Jheniffer 17', 36'; Victória 22'

Estádio Urbano Caldeira, Santos
Referee: Deborah Cecilia Cruz Correia (Pernambuco)

2 September 2023
16:30

Corinthians (São Paulo (state))	2–0	(São Paulo (state)) Santos
Duda Sampaio 63' (pen.); Fernandinha 88'	Report

Estádio Parque São Jorge, São Paulo
Referee: Charly Wendy Straub Deretti (Santa Catarina)

Corinthians won 5–0 on aggregate and advanced to the finals.

==== Group G ====
27 August 2023
10:30

São Paulo (São Paulo (state))	1–3	(São Paulo (state)) Ferroviária
Aline Milene 75'	Report	Barrinha 67'; Laryh 76', 89'

Estádio Bruno José Daniel, Santo André
Referee: Rejane Caetano da Silva (Rio de Janeiro)

2 September 2023
16:30

Ferroviária (São Paulo (state))	0–2	(São Paulo (state)) São Paulo
	Report	Ariel 36'; Micaelly 42'
Penalties
Luana Sartório (penalty scored); Laryh (penalty missed); Eudimilla (penalty scored); Mylena Carioca (penalty scored)	3–1	(penalty missed) Cacau; (penalty missed) Pardal; (penalty missed) Ariel; (penalty scored) Maressa

Fonte Luminosa, Araraquara
Referee: Andreza Helena de Siqueira (Minas Gerais)

Tied 3–3 on aggregate, Ferroviária won on penalties and advanced to the finals.

=== Finals ===
Pos	Team	Pld	W	D	L	GF	GA	GD	Pts	Host
1	(São Paulo (state)) Corinthians	19	16	1	2	64	11	+53	49	2nd leg
2	(São Paulo (state)) Ferroviária	19	14	1	4	45	19	+26	43	1st leg

Source: CBF

Team 1	Agg.	Team 2	1st leg	2nd leg
Ferroviária (São Paulo (state))	1–2	(São Paulo (state)) Corinthians	0–0	1–2

==== Group H ====
7 September 2023
16:20

Ferroviária (São Paulo (state))	0–0	(São Paulo (state)) Corinthians
	Report

Fonte Luminosa, Araraquara
Referee: Thayslane de Melo Costa (Sergipe)

10 September 2023
16:00

Corinthians (São Paulo (state))	2–1	(São Paulo (state)) Ferroviária
Jheniffer 41'; Tamires 57'	Report	Mylena Carioca 9'

Neo Química Arena, São Paulo
Referee: Edina Alves Batista (São Paulo)

== Top goalscorers ==
Rank	Player	Club	Goals
1	(Brazil) Amanda Gutierres	Palmeiras	14
2	(Brazil) Byanca Brasil	Cruzeiro	11
2	(Brazil) Jheniffer	Corinthians	11
4	(Brazil) Aline Gomes	Ferroviária	10
5	(Brazil) Victória	Corinthians	9
6	(Brazil) Cristiane	Santos	8
6	(Brazil) Giovanna Crivelari	Flamengo/Marinha	8
6	(Brazil) Ketlen	Santos	8
6	(Brazil) Laryh	Ferroviária	8
6	(Brazil) Letícia Moreno	Palmeiras	8

Source:CBF
