= 2021 Campeonato Brasileiro de Futebol Feminino Série A1 =

Campeonato Brasileiro de Futebol Feminino Série A1
- Season: 2021
- Dates: 17 April – 26 September 2021
- Champions: Corinthians (3rd title)
- Relegated: Bahia; Botafogo; Minas/ICESP; Napoli
- Copa Libertadores: Corinthians (via Copa Libertadores); Palmeiras; Ferroviária
- Matches played: 134
- Goals scored: 394 (2.94 per match)
- Best Player: Bia Zaneratto
- Top goalscorer: Bia Zaneratto (13 goals)
- Biggest home win: Palmeiras 8–0 Napoli; Group stage, R14, 20 June
- Biggest away win: São José 2–8 Corinthians; Group stage, R7, 13 May
- Highest scoring: 10 goals São José 2–8 Corinthians; Group stage, R7, 13 May

The 2021 Campeonato Brasileiro Feminino A-1 (officially the Brasileirão Feminino Neoenergia 2021 for sponsorship reasons) was the 9th season of the Campeonato Brasileiro de Futebol Feminino Série A1, the top level of women's football in Brazil, and the 5th edition in a Série A1 since its establishment in 2016. The tournament was organized by the Brazilian Football Confederation (CBF). It started on 17 April and ended on 26 September 2021.

In the finals, the defending champions Corinthians won their third title after defeating Palmeiras 4–1 on aggregate.

== Format ==
In the group stage, each team played once against the other fifteen teams. Top eight teams qualified for the final stages. Quarter-finals, semi-finals and finals were played on a home-and-away two-legged basis.

== Teams ==
Location of teams in 2021 Série A1 outside the state of São Paulo (in red).
Location of teams in 2021 Série A1 within the state of São Paulo.

Sixteen teams competed in the league – the top twelve teams from the previous season, as well as four teams promoted from the 2020 Série A2.

Pos.	Relegated from 2020 Série A1
13	Iranduba
14	Audax
15	Ponte Preta
16	Vitória

Pos.	Promoted from 2020 Série A2
1	Napoli
2	Botafogo
3	Bahia
4	Real Brasília

=== Number of teams by state ===
Number of teams	State	Team(s)
6	São Paulo	Corinthians, Ferroviária, Palmeiras, Santos, São José and São Paulo
2	Distrito Federal	Minas/ICESP and Real Brasília
2	Rio de Janeiro	Botafogo and Flamengo/Marinha
2	Rio Grande do Sul	Grêmio and Internacional
2	Santa Catarina	Kindermann/Avaí and Napoli
1	Bahia	Bahia
1	Minas Gerais	Cruzeiro

== Stadiums and locations ==
Team	Location	Stadium	Capacity
Bahia^{[a]}	Salvador	Estádio de Pituaçu	32,157
(Rio de Janeiro (state)) Botafogo^{[b]}	Rio de Janeiro	Olímpico Nilton Santos	46,931
(São Paulo (state)) Corinthians^{[c]}	São Paulo	Parque São Jorge	18,500
(São Paulo (state)) Corinthians^{[c]}	São Paulo	Neo Química Arena	47,605
(Minas Gerais) Cruzeiro	Belo Horizonte	SESC Alterosas	2,000
(São Paulo (state)) Ferroviária^{[d]}	Araraquara	Fonte Luminosa	21,441
(Rio de Janeiro (state)) Flamengo/Marinha	Rio de Janeiro	Estádio da Gávea	4,000
(Rio de Janeiro (state)) Flamengo/Marinha	Rio de Janeiro	Luso Brasileiro	4,697
(Rio Grande do Sul) Grêmio^{[e]}	Porto Alegre	CT Presidente Hélio Dourado (Eldorado do Sul)	1,500
(Rio Grande do Sul) Grêmio^{[e]}	Porto Alegre	Antônio Vieira Ramos (Gravataí)	4,700
(Rio Grande do Sul) Internacional^{[f]}	Porto Alegre	SESC Protásio Alves	2,800
(Rio Grande do Sul) Internacional^{[f]}	Porto Alegre	Beira-Rio	50,128
(Santa Catarina (state)) Kindermann/Avaí	Caçador	Carlos Alberto da Costa Neves	6,500
(Santa Catarina (state)) Kindermann/Avaí	Florianópolis	Estádio da Ressacada	17,826
(Federal District (Brazil)) Minas/ICESP	Brasília	Maria de Lourdes Abadia (Ceilândia)	3,000
(Federal District (Brazil)) Minas/ICESP	Brasília	Ciro Machado do Espírito Santo	1,500
(Santa Catarina (state)) Napoli^{[g]}	Caçador	Carlos Alberto da Costa Neves	6,500
(São Paulo (state)) Palmeiras	São Paulo	Allianz Parque	43,713
(São Paulo (state)) Palmeiras	São Paulo	Estádio do Canindé	22,375
(Federal District (Brazil)) Real Brasília^{[h]}	Brasília	Ciro Machado do Espírito Santo	1,500
(São Paulo (state)) Santos^{[i]}	Santos	Urbano Caldeira	21,732
(São Paulo (state)) São José	São José dos Campos	Martins Pereira	16,500
(São Paulo (state)) São Paulo	São Paulo	Marcelo Portugal Gouvêa (Cotia)	2,000
(São Paulo (state)) São Paulo	São Paulo	Arena Barueri (Barueri)	31,452
(São Paulo (state)) São Paulo	São Paulo	Estádio do Morumbi	77,011

^{a} Bahia also played home matches at Estádio Joia da Princesa (Feira de Santana).
^{b} Botafogo also played home matches at Estádio Luso Brasileiro (Rio de Janeiro).
^{c} Corinthians also played home matches at Arena Barueri (Barueri).
^{d} Ferroviária also played home matches at Estádio Major José Levy Sobrinho (Limeira), Estádio Zezinho Magalhães (Jaú) and Estádio Alfredo de Castilho (Bauru).
^{e} Grêmio also played home matches at Estádio João Corrêa da Silveira (São Leopoldo).
^{f} Internacional also played home matches at Estádio João Corrêa da Silveira (São Leopoldo).
^{g} Napoli also played home matches at CT Água Amarela (Chapecó).
^{h} Real Brasília also played home matches at Estádio Zequinha Roriz (Luziânia).
^{i} Santos also played home matches at Estádio Municipal Prefeito José Liberatti (Osasco) and Arena Barueri (Barueri).

== Group stage ==
In the group stage, each team played on a single round-robin tournament. The top eight teams advanced to the quarter-finals of the knockout stages. The teams were ranked according to points (3 points for a win, 1 point for a draw, and 0 points for a loss). If tied on points, the following criteria would be used to determine the ranking: 1. Wins; 2. Goal difference; 3. Goals scored; 4. Fewest red cards; 5. Fewest yellow cards; 6. Draw in the headquarters of the Brazilian Football Confederation (Regulations Article 13).

=== Group A ===
Pos	Team	Pld	W	D	L	GF	GA	GD	Pts	Qualification or relegation
1	Corinthians	15	12	2	1	44	13	+31	38	Advance to Quarter-finals
2	Palmeiras	15	11	4	0	45	13	+32	37	Advance to Quarter-finals
3	São Paulo	15	8	5	2	31	14	+17	29	Advance to Quarter-finals
4	Santos	15	8	3	4	27	17	+10	27	Advance to Quarter-finals
5	Ferroviária	15	8	3	4	21	15	+6	27	Advance to Quarter-finals
6	Internacional	15	8	3	4	19	16	+3	27	Advance to Quarter-finals
7	Grêmio	15	7	4	4	27	21	+6	25	Advance to Quarter-finals
8	Kindermann/Avaí	15	6	3	6	19	19	0	21	Advance to Quarter-finals
9	Flamengo/Marinha	15	4	6	5	14	19	−5	18	
10	Real Brasília	15	4	6	5	12	22	−10	18	
11	Cruzeiro	15	4	3	8	24	25	−1	15	
12	São José	15	3	4	8	16	28	−12	13	
13	Botafogo (R)	15	2	5	8	13	22	−9	11	Relegation to Campeonato Brasileiro Série A2
14	Minas/ICESP (R)	15	2	5	8	11	26	−15	11	Relegation to Campeonato Brasileiro Série A2
15	Napoli (R)	15	1	4	10	9	43	−34	7	Relegation to Campeonato Brasileiro Série A2
16	Bahia (R)	15	0	4	11	8	27	−19	4	Relegation to Campeonato Brasileiro Série A2

Source: CBF
(R) Relegated

=== Results ===
Home \ Away	BAH	BOT	COR	CRU	FER	FLA	GRE	INT	KIN	MIN	NAP	PAL	RBR	SAN	SJO	SPO
Bahia					0–1	0–1		0–2	0–2					0–2	1–1	2–3
Botafogo	0–0							0–2		2–0	2–0	0–4		2–3	1–1	
Corinthians	2–0	3–1		2–1			3–2			5–0	3–0	1–1	5–2			
Cruzeiro	4–0	1–1				1–2					3–0		1–1		1–2	2–2
Ferroviária		2–1	0–1	3–1		2–1	1–2		1–0				3–1			0–0
Flamengo/Marinha		1–1	0–3					0–1	1–0	1–1				2–0	2–2	
Grêmio	4–2	0–0		2–1		1–1				2–0	5–1			1–2	2–1	
Internacional			0–4	1–0	3–1		2–1		1–1	0–0		2–3		1–1		
Kindermann/Avaí		3–2	1–1	3–1			2–3				0–1	0–3		2–1		1–1
Minas/ICESP	1–0			1–3	1–0				2–3			2–3		2–2	0–1	
Napoli	2–2				1–3	0–0		1–2		0–0			1–1		0–2	
Palmeiras	1–0			4–2	2–2	3–1	4–1				8–0		4–0			1–1
Real Brasília	1–1	1–0				1–1	0–0	1–0	1–0	1–1						
Santos			2–1	1–2	1–2						5–1	0–0	3–0		2–0	2–1
São José			2–8		0–0			1–2	0–1			1–4	0–1			2–3
São Paulo		1–0	1–2			3–0	1–1	2–0		3–0	7–1		2–0			

Source: CBF
Legend: Blue = home team win; Yellow = draw; Red = away team win.

== Final stages ==
Starting from the quarter-finals, the teams played a single-elimination tournament with the following rules:

- Quarter-finals, semi-finals and finals were played on a home-and-away two-legged basis, with the higher-seeded team hosting the second leg.
  - If tied on aggregate, the penalty shoot-out would be used to determine the winners (Regulations Article 14).
- Extra time would not be played and away goals rule would not be used in final stages.

Starting from the semi-finals, the teams were seeded according to their performance in the tournament. The teams were ranked according to overall points. If tied on overall points, the following criteria would be used to determine the ranking: 1. Overall wins; 2. Overall goal difference; 3. Draw in the headquarters of the Brazilian Football Confederation (Regulations Article 18).

=== Bracket ===
Quarter-finals
(Rio Grande do Sul) Internacional	1	3	4
(São Paulo (state)) São Paulo	2	1	3
(Rio Grande do Sul) Grêmio	2	1	3
(São Paulo (state)) Palmeiras	1	4	5
(São Paulo (state)) Ferroviária	3	2	5
(São Paulo (state)) Santos	2	2	4
(Santa Catarina (state)) Kindermann/Avaí	1	0	1
(São Paulo (state)) Corinthians	4	6	10

Semi-finals
(Rio Grande do Sul) Internacional	0	1	1
(São Paulo (state)) Palmeiras	1	4	5
(São Paulo (state)) Ferroviária	1	1	2
(São Paulo (state)) Corinthians	3	3	6

Finals
(São Paulo (state)) Palmeiras	0	1	1
(São Paulo (state)) Corinthians	1	3	4

=== Quarter-finals ===
Team 1	Agg.	Team 2	1st leg	2nd leg
Kindermann/Avaí (Santa Catarina (state))	1–10	(São Paulo (state)) Corinthians	1–4	0–6
Grêmio (Rio Grande do Sul)	3–5	(São Paulo (state)) Palmeiras	2–1	1–4
Internacional (Rio Grande do Sul)	4–3	(São Paulo (state)) São Paulo	1–2	3–1
Ferroviária (São Paulo (state))	5–4	(São Paulo (state)) Santos	3–2	2–2

==== Group B ====
15 August 2021
20:00

Kindermann/Avaí (Santa Catarina (state))	1–4	(São Paulo (state)) Corinthians
Lelê 9'	Report	Jheniffer 26'; Tamires 43'; Victória 77'; Giovanna Campiolo 89'

Estádio da Ressacada, Florianópolis
Attendance: 36
Referee: Gustavo Ervino Bauermann (Santa Catarina)

22 August 2021
17:00

Corinthians (São Paulo (state))	6–0	(Santa Catarina (state)) Kindermann/Avaí
Victória 15' (pen.); Adriana 22'; Yasmim 27'; Jheniffer 47'; Tamires 69'; Katiuscia 87'	Report

Estádio Parque São Jorge, São Paulo
Attendance: 0
Referee: Thiago Lourenço de Mattos (São Paulo)

Corinthians won 10–1 on aggregate and advanced to the semi-finals.

==== Group C ====
14 August 2021
15:00

Grêmio (Rio Grande do Sul)	2–1	(São Paulo (state)) Palmeiras
Pri Back 22' (pen.); Rafa Levis 42'	Report	Carol Baiana 27'

Estádio Antônio Vieira Ramos, Gravataí
Attendance: 0
Referee: Roger Goulart (Rio Grande do Sul)

22 August 2021
20:00

Palmeiras (São Paulo (state))	4–1	(Rio Grande do Sul) Grêmio
Ary Borges 20'; Barroso 47'; Carol Baiana 52'; Maria Alves 71'	Report	Eudimilla 36'

Allianz Parque, São Paulo
Attendance: 0
Referee: Ilbert Estevam da Silva (São Paulo)

Palmeiras won 5–3 on aggregate and advanced to the semi-finals.

==== Group D ====
16 August 2021
17:00

Internacional (Rio Grande do Sul)	1–2	(São Paulo (state)) São Paulo
Djeni 90+2'	Report	Gláucia 60' (pen.); Duda 82'

Estádio Beira-Rio, Porto Alegre
Attendance: 0
Referee: Rafael Rodrigo Klein (Rio Grande do Sul)

22 August 2021
11:00

São Paulo (São Paulo (state))	1–3	(Rio Grande do Sul) Internacional
Gislaine 21'	Report	Fabiana 34'; Ariane 84'; Shashá 90+3'

Estádio do Morumbi, São Paulo
Attendance: 0
Referee: Adriano de Assis Miranda (São Paulo)

Internacional won 4–3 on aggregate and advanced to the semi-finals.

==== Group E ====
15 August 2021
16:00

Ferroviária (São Paulo (state))	3–2	(São Paulo (state)) Santos
Rafa Mineira 18'; Monalisa 25'; Aline 75'	Report	Ketlen 7'; Jaimes 40'

Estádio Fonte Luminosa, Araraquara
Attendance: 0
Referee: Thiago Duarte Peixoto (São Paulo)

23 August 2021
19:00

Santos (São Paulo (state))	2–2	(São Paulo (state)) Ferroviária
Jaimes 45+4'; Day Silva 61'	Report	Rafa Mineira 48'; Aline Milene 71'

Estádio Urbano Caldeira, Santos
Attendance: 0
Referee: Adeli Mara Monteiro (São Paulo)

Ferroviária won 5–4 on aggregate and advanced to the semi-finals.

=== Semi-finals ===
Pos	Team	Pld	W	D	L	GF	GA	GD	Pts	Host
1	(São Paulo (state)) Corinthians	17	14	2	1	54	14	+40	44	Second leg
3	(São Paulo (state)) Ferroviária	17	9	4	4	26	19	+7	31	First leg
2	(São Paulo (state)) Palmeiras	17	12	4	1	50	16	+34	40	Second leg
4	(Rio Grande do Sul) Internacional	17	9	3	5	23	19	+4	30	First leg

Source: CBF

Team 1	Agg.	Team 2	1st leg	2nd leg
Ferroviária (São Paulo (state))	2–6	(São Paulo (state)) Corinthians	1–3	1–3
Internacional (Rio Grande do Sul)	1–5	(São Paulo (state)) Palmeiras	0–1	1–4

==== Group F ====
29 August 2021
20:00

Ferroviária (São Paulo (state))	1–3	(São Paulo (state)) Corinthians
Yasmin Cosmann 8'	Report	Victória 3'; Gabi Zanotti 17'; Érika 71'

Estádio Fonte Luminosa, Araraquara
Attendance: 0
Referee: Daiane Caroline Muniz dos Santos (São Paulo)

5 September 2021
20:00

Corinthians (São Paulo (state))	3–1	(São Paulo (state)) Ferroviária
Géssica 8' (o.g.); Érika 35'; Gabi Zanotti 54'	Report	Rafa Mineira 84' (pen.)

Arena Barueri, Barueri
Attendance: 0
Referee: Deborah Cecília Cruz Correia (Pernambuco)

Corinthians won 6–2 on aggregate and advanced to the finals.

==== Group G ====
30 August 2021
20:00

Internacional (Rio Grande do Sul)	0–1	(São Paulo (state)) Palmeiras
	Report	Chú 74'

Estádio Beira-Rio, Porto Alegre
Attendance: 0
Referee: Rejane Caetano da Silva (Rio de Janeiro)

5 September 2021
11:00

Palmeiras (São Paulo (state))	4–1	(Rio Grande do Sul) Internacional
Chú 6', 75'; Maria Alves 68'; Katrine 82' (pen.)	Report	Mileninha 58'

Allianz Parque, São Paulo
Attendance: 0
Referee: Charly Wendy Straub Deretti (Santa Catarina)

Paimeiras won 5–1 on aggregate and advanced to the finals.

=== Finals ===
Pos	Team	Pld	W	D	L	GF	GA	GD	Pts	Host
1	(São Paulo (state)) Corinthians	19	16	2	1	60	16	+44	50	2nd leg
2	(São Paulo (state)) Palmeiras	19	14	4	1	55	17	+38	46	1st leg

Source: CBF

Team 1	Agg.	Team 2	1st leg	2nd leg
Palmeiras (São Paulo (state))	1–4	(São Paulo (state)) Corinthians	0–1	1–3

==== Group H ====
12 September 2021
21:00

Palmeiras (São Paulo (state))	0–1	(São Paulo (state)) Corinthians
	Report	Gabi Portilho 67'

Allianz Parque, São Paulo
Attendance: 0
Referee: Thayslane de Melo Costa (Sergipe)

26 September 2021
21:00

Corinthians (São Paulo (state))	3–1	(São Paulo (state)) Palmeiras
Barroso 23' (o.g.); Adriana 33'; Victória 37'	Report	Camilinha 74'

Neo Química Arena, São Paulo
Attendance: 0
Referee: Edina Alves Batista (São Paulo)

== Top goalscorers ==
Rank	Player	Club	Goals
1	Bia Zaneratto	Palmeiras	13
2	Duda	São Paulo	10
2	Victória	Corinthians	10
4	Gabi Nunes	Corinthians	9
5	Jheniffer	Corinthians	8
6	Fabiana	Internacional	7
6	Laís Estevam	Grêmio	7
6	Laryh	Kindermann/Avaí	7
6	Mariana Santos	Cruzeiro	7
6	Rafa Mineira	Ferroviária	7

Source:CBF

== Awards ==
=== Individual awards ===
The following players were rewarded for their performances during the competition.

- Best player: Bia Zaneratto (Palmeiras)
- Breakthrough player: Rafa Levis (Grêmio)
- Topscorer: Bia Zaneratto (Palmeiras)
- Best goal of the tournament: Jayanne (Flamengo/Marinha, playing against Minas/ICESP (Group stage first round))
- Best player (Internet-based poll): Rayanne (Flamengo/Marinha)

=== Best XI ===
The best XI team was a squad consisting of the eleven most impressive players at the tournament.

Pos.	Player	Team
GK	(Brazil) Luciana	Ferroviária
DF	(Brazil) Bruna Calderan	Palmeiras
DF	(Brazil) Érika	Corinthians
DF	(Argentina) Agustina Barroso	Palmeiras
DF	(Brazil) Yasmim	Corinthians
MF	(Brazil) Julia Bianchi	Palmeiras
MF	(Brazil) Ingryd	Corinthians
MF	(Brazil) Gabi Zanotti	Corinthians
MF	(Brazil) Tamires	Corinthians
FW	(Brazil) Bia Zaneratto	Palmeiras
FW	(Brazil) Adriana	Corinthians
Head coach	(Brazil) Arthur Elias	Corinthians

Head coach
(Brazil) Arthur Elias
