= Érika (Brazilian footballer) =

Brazilian footballer

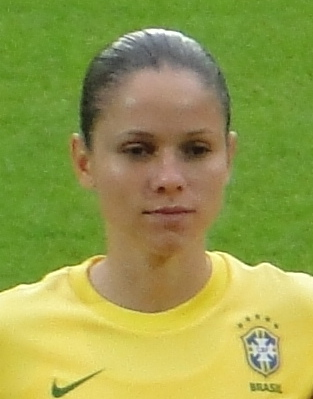
- Érika in 2011

Personal information
- Full name: Érika Cristiano dos Santos
- Date of birth: 4 February 1988 (age 38)
- Place of birth: São Paulo, Brazil
- Height: 1.73 m (5 ft 8 in)
- Positions: Midfielder; defender; forward

Team information
- Current team: Corinthians
- Number: 99

Youth career
- Associação Sabesp

Senior career*
Years	Team	Apps	(Gls)
2003–2004	Juventus		
2005–2008	Santos		
2009	FC Gold Pride	7	(0)
2009	Santos		
2010	Foz Cataratas		
2011	Santos		
2012–2015	Centro Olímpico	11	(1)
2015–2018	Paris Saint-Germain	45	(9)
2018–	Corinthians	89	(12)

International career
2004–2008	Brazil U-20		
2006–2021	Brazil	87	(16)
Medal record
Women's football
Representing Brazil
Olympic Games
Silver medal – second place	2008 Beijing	Team
Pan American Games
Gold medal – first place	2015 Toronto	Team
Copa América Femenina
Gold medal – first place	2010 Ecuador
Gold medal – first place	2018 Chile
- * Club domestic league appearances and goals as of 06 February 2026

Érika Cristiano dos Santos (born 4 February 1988), commonly known as Érika, is a Brazilian professional footballer who plays for Corinthians and the Brazilian women's national team. Érika played as a forward for her clubs and Brazil's youth teams, but mainly as a central defender or "volante" (defensive midfielder) for the senior national team. She was part of Brazil's silver medal-winning team at the 2008 Beijing Olympics and also played at the 2011 FIFA Women's World Cup, the 2012 London Olympics, the 2016 Rio Olympics, and the 2020 Tokyo Olympics.

At the club level, Érika enjoyed three successful spells with Santos and was hurt when the male parent club disbanded the female section in 2012. She also spent the 2009 season with American Women's Professional Soccer (WPS) franchise FC Gold Pride. After the demise of Santos, Érika and nine other former Santos players agreed to join Centro Olímpico. She played for Paris Saint-Germain between 2015 and 2018 before returning to Brazil with Corinthians.

== Club career ==
At six years old, Érika became the first female pupil at Marcelinho Carioca's football school. She then played futebol de salão for Associação Sabesp, where the rules were changed to allow her to compete against adults at the age of 12. Érika's mother arranged a place at Clube Atlético Juventus, where she began playing outdoors and quickly came to the attention of national youth team selectors and leading women's club Santos. With Santos Érika won the Campeonato Paulista in 2007 and the 2008 Copa do Brasil.

Érika was picked by FC Gold Pride, a team in the new Women's Professional Soccer from Santa Clara, California, in the 2008 WPS International Draft. The team's assistant coach was Sissi, Érika's compatriot and mentor. After appearing in seven FC Gold Pride games during 2009, Érika was made a free agent at the season's close by coach Albertin Montoya.

She returned to Santos and was part of the club's 2009 Copa Libertadores Femenina-winning team in November 2009, scoring twice in the 9–0 final win over UAA. The following month Santos retained the Copa do Brasil after beating Botucatu 3–0 in the final at Estádio do Pacaembu.

In early 2012, Santos' board of directors scrapped the women's section to save money after the club handed their male player Neymar a gigantic new contract. Érika was surprised and hurt by the development. She cried at the press conference announcement and publicly contemplated a contract offer from a South Korean club.

With Neymar's assistance, Érika and the displaced Santos players secured around $1,500,000 in external sponsorship. But Santos' board refused to reverse their decision, claiming that the women's team cost $2,000,000 a year to run and provided no financial return. Instead ten of the players including Érika moved to Centro Olímpico.

In late 2013, Érika suffered an anterior cruciate ligament injury, which kept her out of football for around ten months, until September 2014. In August 2015 Érika and compatriot Cristiane made a double transfer to French UEFA Women's Champions League contenders Paris Saint-Germain Féminines. Both were named in the 2015–16 French Football Federation Team of the Season. In January 2017 Paris Saint-Germain agreed to release Érika from the final six months of her contract, as she had returned to Brazil to rehabilitate an injury.

In July 2017, having recovered, she agreed to return to Paris Saint-Germain on a new one-year contract. She made 20 appearances in 2017–18, including the 1–0 Coupe de France Féminine final win over rivals Lyon. On the expiry of her contract she returned to Brazil for surgery on ovarian cysts. She had an offer from a Chinese club but preferred to stay close to her family after three years away. She accepted an offer to join Corinthians and remarked upon a "gigantic evolution" in Brazilian club football since she moved away to France.

Érika became an important part of a successful team at Corinthians, the club she supported. She suffered another anterior cruciate ligament injury in November 2021, when training with Corinthians in Paraguay during the 2021 Copa Libertadores Femenina. She returned to fitness, almost a year later, in time for the 2022 Copa Libertadores Femenina.

== International career ==
At 15 years old, Érika played for Brazil at the 2004 FIFA U-19 Women's World Championship. She also featured at the 2006 edition of the event, which had changed to under-20 from under-19, as Brazil came third. Still eligible in 2008, Érika scored two goals in Brazil's run to the quarter-finals and was named in the tournament all-star team. She had been the joint top goal scorer with seven goals at the 2008 South American Under-20 Women's Football Championship, which served as the qualifying tournament.

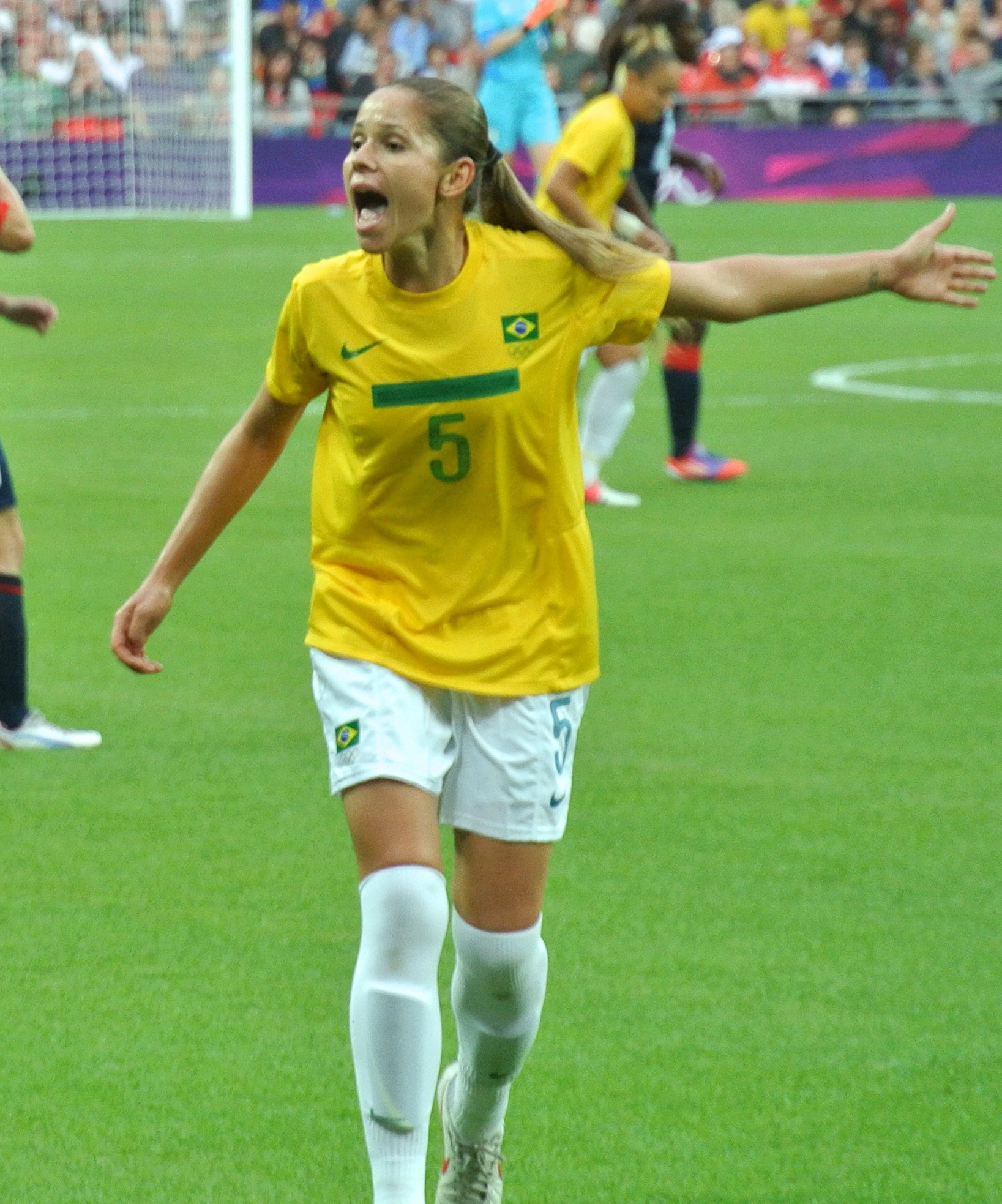
Érika at the 2012 Olympics

In November 2006, Érika made her senior international debut in Brazil's 6–1 South American Women's Football Championship win over Bolivia at Estadio José María Minella, Mar del Plata. She was withdrawn from Brazil's 2007 Pan American Games squad two days before the tournament, with injured ankle ligaments.

At the 2008 edition of the Olympic Football Tournament, Érika replaced Andréia Rosa in central defence after the first match. She remained in the team and collected a silver medal when Brazil lost the final 1–0 after extra time to the United States.

In November 2010, Érika scored Brazil's first goal in a 5–0 2010 South American Women's Football Championship win over Colombia, which ensured qualification for the following year's FIFA Women's World Cup in Germany.

At the 2011 FIFA Women's World Cup, Érika scored Brazil's opening goal in a 3–0 win over Equatorial Guinea. Brazil then lost a controversial quarter-final on penalties to the United States after a 2–2 draw. American players, supporters and media were unhappy that Érika appeared to exaggerate an injury during extra time to use up valuable seconds. Érika was shown the yellow card and then Abby Wambach equalised in time which the referee had added on for the contentious injury.

Érika went to her second Olympic football tournament at London 2012. FIFA.com described her as one of the team's key players. Amidst allegations of a broken down bus plot, Brazil lost their final group E game 1–0 to hosts Great Britain before a record crowd of 70,584 at Wembley Stadium. That meant a quarter-final against World Cup holders Japan, who eliminated Brazil by winning 2–0 at Cardiff's Millennium Stadium.

She returned to the national team for the 2014 Torneio Internacional de Brasília de Futebol Feminino after almost two years away with injuries. She recalled playing in every outfield position for the national team, except on the wings, and was happy to keep fitting in where required. On the eve of the 2015 FIFA Women's World Cup, Érika sustained a knee injury and was replaced in the squad by Rafinha.

Érika recovered from her injury and was named to the Brazil squad for the 2016 Summer Olympics, her third Olympic tournament. She appeared in two matches, including the bronze medal match, which hosts Brazil lost 2–1 to Canada. Érika arrived at Brazil's training camp for the 2019 FIFA Women's World Cup with a sprained ankle, then suffered a calf injury. She was removed from the squad and replaced by Daiane Limeira.

At the 2020 Summer Olympics, postponed until 2021 by the COVID-19 pandemic, Érika participated in her fourth Olympic Games.

== Career statistics ==
=== International ===
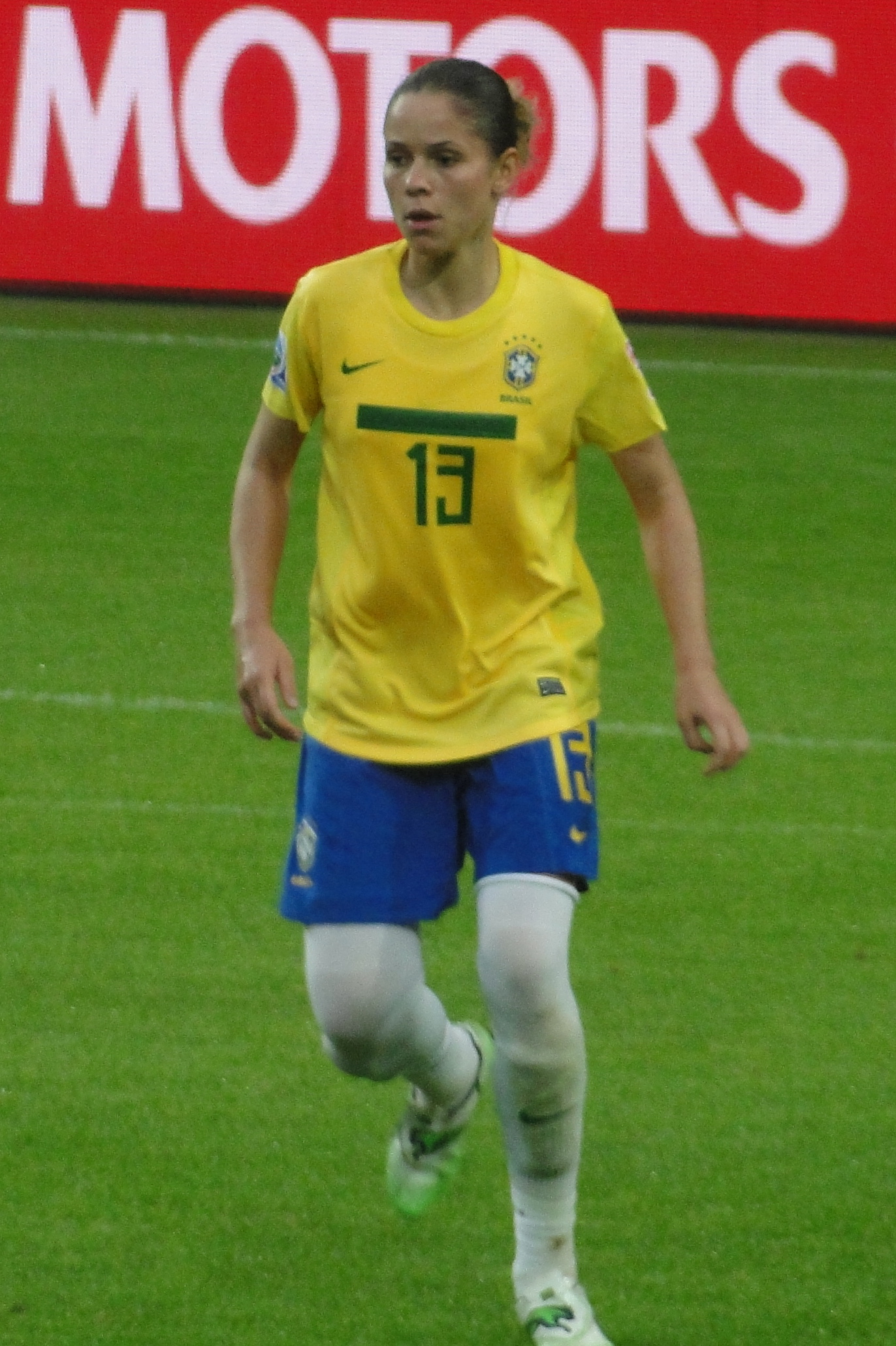
At the 2011 FIFA Women's World Cup

Updated 30 July 2021.

Brazil national team
Year	Apps	Goals
2006	5	0
2007	0	0
2008	10	1
2009	6	2
2010	8	1
2011	9	5
2012	11	1
2013	0	0
2014	0	0
2015	5	1
2016	5	0
2017	4	1
2018	2	2
2019	12	1
2020	2	1
2021	4	0
Total	83	15

=== International goals ===
Key (expand for notes on "international goals" and sorting)
Location	Geographic location of the venue where the competition occurred Sorted by country name first, then by city name
Lineup	Start – played entire match on minute (off player) – substituted on at the minute indicated, and player was substituted off at the same time off minute (on player) – substituted off at the minute indicated, and player was substituted on at the same time (c) – captain Sorted by minutes played
#	NumberOfGoals.goalNumber scored by the player in the match (alternate notation to Goal in match)
Min	The minute in the match the goal was scored. For list that include caps, blank indicates played in the match but did not score a goal.
Assist/pass	The ball was passed by the player, which assisted in scoring the goal. This column depends on the availability and source of this information.
penalty or pk	Goal scored on penalty-kick which was awarded due to foul by opponent. (Goals scored in penalty-shoot-out, at the end of a tied match after extra-time, are not included.)
Score	The match score after the goal was scored. Sorted by goal difference, then by goal scored by the player's team
Result	The final score. Sorted by goal difference in the match, then by goal difference in penalty-shoot-out if it is taken, followed by goal scored by the player's team in the match, then by goal scored in the penalty-shoot-out. For matches with identical final scores, match ending in extra-time without penalty-shoot-out is a tougher match, therefore precede matches that ended in regulation
aet	The score at the end of extra-time; the match was tied at the end of 90' regulation
pso	Penalty-shoot-out score shown in parentheses; the match was tied at the end of extra-time
	Green background color – exhibition or closed door international friendly match
	Yellow background color – match at an invitational tournament
	Red background color – Olympic women's football qualification match
	Light-blue background color – FIFA women's world cup qualification match
	Pink background color – Olympic women's football tournament
	Blue background color – FIFA women's world cup final tournament
NOTE: some keys may not apply for a particular football player

Goal	Date	Location	Opponent	#	Score	Result	Competition
1	2008-06-15	Suwon, South Korea	Italy	1.1	1–0	2–1	2008 Peace Queen Cup
2	2009-12-13	São Paulo, Brazil	Mexico	1.1	2–0	3–2	Torneio Internacional 2009
3	2010-11-19	Latacunga, Ecuador	Colombia	1.1	1–0	5–0	Copa America 2010
4	2011-07-06	Frankfurt, Germany	Equatorial Guinea	1.1	1–0	3–0	2011 FIFA Women's World Cup
5	2011-12-08	São Paulo, Brazil	Italy	1.1	1–1	5–1	Torneio Internacional 2011
6	2011-12-11	São Paulo, Brazil	Chile	1.1	1–0	4–0	Torneio Internacional 2011
7	2011-12-18	São Paulo, Brazil	Denmark	2.1	1–1	2–1	Torneio Internacional 2011
8	2011-12-18	São Paulo, Brazil	Denmark	2.2	2–1	2–1	Torneio Internacional 2011
9	2012-12-16	São Paulo, Brazil	Denmark	1.1	1–0	2–1	Torneio Internacional 2012
10	2015-12-01	Cuiabá, Brazil	New Zealand	1.1	2–1	5–1	Friendly game
11	2017-11-25	Ovalle, Chile	Chile	1.1	1–0	4–0	Friendly game
12	2018-4-13	Coquimbo, Chile	Bolivia	2.1	1–0	7–0	2018 Copa América Femenina
13	2018-4-13	Coquimbo, Chile	Bolivia	2.2	5–0	7–0	2018 Copa América Femenina
14	2019-08-29	São Paulo, Brazil	Argentina	1.1	4–0	5–0	2019 International Women's Football Tournament
15	2020-12-01	São Paulo, Brazil	Ecuador	1.1	8–0	8–0	Friendly game

== Personal life ==
Érika is an outspoken advocate of women's football in Brazil. When Brazil lost 5–1 to Germany at the 2014 FIFA U-20 Women's World Cup, she rejected misleading comparisons to the wealthy male team's recent 7–1 defeat by Germany at the 2014 FIFA World Cup. In a damning open letter, signed by 100 female athletes, she branded Brazil "a sexist and bigoted country that never believed in, accepted, or invested properly in women's football".

One of Érika's coaches at youth level was Marcinha, a pioneering veteran of EC Radar and Brazil's 1991 FIFA Women's World Cup squad.

== Honors ==
Santos

- Copa Libertadores Femenina: 2009
- Copa do Brasil de Futebol Feminino: 2008, 2009
- Campeonato Paulista: 2007, 2011
- Taça Brasil: 2007

Paris Saint-Germain

- Coupe de France: 2017-18

Corinthians

- Copa Libertadores Femenina: 2019, 2021, 2023, 2024, 2025
- Campeonato Brasileiro Série A1: 2020, 2021, 2022, 2023, 2024, 2025
- Supercopa do Brasil: 2022, 2023, 2024
- Campeonato Paulista: 2019, 2020, 2021, 2023
- Copa Paulista: 2022

Brazil

- Sudamericano Femenino: 2010, 2018
- Pan American Games: 2015

=== Individual ===
- IFFHS CONMEBOL Woman Team of the Decade 2011–2020
