= Bianca Gomes =

Brazilian footballer (born 1990)

Personal information
- Full name: Bianca Gomes de Lima
- Date of birth: 10 August 1990 (age 36)
- Place of birth: São Paulo, Brazil
- Height: 1.69 m (5 ft 7 in)
- Position: Forward

Team information
- Current team: Palmeiras
- Number: 15

Senior career*
Years	Team	Apps	(Gls)
2017	Audax	16	(2)
2017	3B da Amazônia	0	(0)
2018	Guangdong Huijun		
2019–2020	Palmeiras	24	(6)
2021–2022	Corinthians	18	(1)
2023	Santos	6	(1)
2023–	Palmeiras	4	(0)
- * Club domestic league appearances and goals as of 13:42, 12 April 2024 (UTC)

Bianca Gomes de Lima (born 10 August 1990), known as Bianca Gomes or just Bianca, is a Brazilian footballer who plays as a forward for Palmeiras.

== Club career ==
=== Futsal ===
Born in São Paulo, Bianca began her career in futsal, playing in the sport until the age of 26.

=== Audax ===
In 2017, she moved to football and started playing at Audax, and also represented 3B da Amazônia later in the year. Bianca made her league debut against Sport Recife on 12 March 2017. She scored her first goal for the club against Iranduba on 26 March 2017, scoring in the 58th minute.

=== Guangdong Meizhou Huijun ===
In March 2018, Bianca moved abroad and joined Chinese Women's Football Championship side Guangdong Meizhou Huijun. She returned to her home country in the following year, signing for Palmeiras.

=== Corinthians ===
On 11 January 2021, Bianca was announced at Corinthians. She made her league debut against Napoli on 18 April 2021. Bianca scored her first goal against RB Bragantino on 5 March 2022, scoring in the 45th+4th minute.

She left the club on 21 December 2022.

=== Santos ===
Bianca moved to Santos the following 9 January. She scored on her league debut, scoring against Athletico Paranaense on 4 March 2023, scoring in the 89th minute.

=== Second spell at Palmeiras ===
Bianca joined Palmeiras on 8 September 2023. She made her league debut against Flamengo on 16 March 2024.

== Honours ==
Palmeiras

- Copa Paulista de Futebol Feminino: 2019

Corinthians

- Campeonato Brasileiro de Futebol Feminino Série A1: 2021, 2022
- Campeonato Paulista de Futebol Feminino: 2021
- Copa Libertadores Femenina: 2021
- Supercopa do Brasil de Futebol Feminino: 2022
- Copa Paulista de Futebol Feminino: 2022
