= Kössler =

Kössler is a surname. Notable people with the surname include:

- Elena Kössler (born 1999), Austrian football player
- Georg Kössler (born 1984), German politician
- Melissa Kössler (born 2000), German football player
