= Giovanna Campiolo =

Brazilian footballer (born 1996)

Personal information
- Full name: Giovanna Campiolo Rocha
- Date of birth: 14 June 1996 (age 30)
- Place of birth: Guaratinguetá, Brazil
- Height: 1.68 m (5 ft 6 in)
- Position: Centre back

Team information
- Current team: Corinthians
- Number: 4

Youth career
- 2010–2013: Taubaté

Senior career*
Years	Team	Apps	(Gls)
2014–2016	Portuguesa	7	(0)
2016	Foz Cataratas		
2017	Kindermann/Avaí	9	(1)
2018–	Corinthians	35	(1)

International career^{‡}
2016	Brazil U20	3	(0)
- * Club domestic league appearances and goals as of 05:23, 6 May 2022 (UTC) ‡ National team caps and goals as of 05:23, 6 May 2022 (UTC)

Giovanna Campiolo Rocha (born 14 June 1996) is a Brazilian professional footballer who plays as a central defender for Corinthians and the Brazil women's national team.

== Club career ==
Campiolo was born in Guaratinguetá, São Paulo, and began his career with Taubaté's youth setup. She later moved to Portuguesa, and played for brief periods at Foz Cataratas and Kindermann/Avaí.

In 2018, Campiolo moved to Corinthians.

== International career ==
After representing Brazil at under-20 side, Campiolo received her first call-up for the full side in March 2022.

== Honours ==
=== Club ===
Corinthians

- Campeonato Brasileiro de Futebol Feminino Série A1: 2018, 2020, 2021
- Campeonato Paulista de Futebol Feminino: 2019, 2020, 2021
- Copa Libertadores Femenina: 2019, 2021
