= 2019 Campeonato Paulista de Futebol Feminino =

Women's football competition in Brazil

Campeonato Paulista de Futebol Feminino
- Season: 2019
- Dates: 31 March – 16 November 2019
- Champions: Corinthians
- Matches: 90
- Goals: 275 (3.06 per match)
- Top goalscorer: (Brazil) Victória Albuquerque (11 goals)

The Paulista Football Championship of 2019 was the 27th edition of this championship women's football organized by the Paulista Football Federation (FPF). Played between March and November, the competition had twelve participants.

== Format ==
The 2019 Campeonato Paulista de Futebol Feminino will be held in four stages:

In the first, the twelve were divided into 2 groups of 6 teams, facing each other home and away, with the four best in each group qualifying to the next round. In the second, the eight teams were divided into 2 groups of 4 teams, facing each other home and away, with the two best in each group qualifying to the semifinals. The semifinals and the final were played in home and away eliminatory games.

== Teams ==
Team	City	2018 result
Audax	Osasco	Second stage
Corinthians	São Paulo	2nd
Ferroviaria	Araraquara	Second stage
Internacional	Franca	–
Juventus	São Paulo	First stage
Palmeiras	São Paulo	–
Ponte Preta	Campinas	Second stage
Portuguesa	São Paulo	First stage
Santos	Santos	1st
São José	São José dos Campos	Second stage
São Paulo	São Paulo	–
Taubaté	Taubaté	Semifinal

Source: "Regulamento específico do campeonato paulista de futebol feminino primeira divisão - 2019" (PDF). futebolpaulista.com.br. Federação Paulista de Futebol. 13 March 2019.

== First stage ==
=== Group 1 ===
Pos	Team	Pld	W	D	L	GF	GA	GD	Pts	Qualification
1	São Paulo	10	6	4	0	19	7	+12	22	Advanced to Second stage
2	Ferroviaria	10	5	5	0	20	5	+15	20	Advanced to Second stage
3	Ponte Preta	10	5	0	5	15	16	−1	15	Advanced to Second stage
4	Palmeiras	10	3	4	3	12	10	+2	13	Advanced to Second stage
5	Audax	10	2	3	5	9	12	−3	9	
6	Internacional	10	1	0	9	4	29	−25	3	

Updated to match(es) played on 15 June 2019. Source: FPF
Rules for classification: 1) points; 2) wins; 3) goal difference; 4) goals scored; 5) head-to-head results (only between 2 teams); 6) fewest red cards; 7) fewest yellow cards; 8) draw.

=== Group 2 ===
Pos	Team	Pld	W	D	L	GF	GA	GD	Pts	Qualification
1	Corinthians	10	10	0	0	32	5	+27	30	Advanced to Second stage
2	Santos	10	8	0	2	34	12	+22	24	Advanced to Second stage
3	São José	10	5	1	4	14	15	−1	16	Advanced to Second stage
4	Juventus	10	2	2	6	14	31	−17	8	Advanced to Second stage
5	Portuguesa	10	1	1	8	7	30	−23	4	
6	Taubaté	10	0	4	6	10	18	−8	4	

Updated to match(es) played on 15 June 2019. Source: FPF
Rules for classification: 1) points; 2) wins; 3) goal difference; 4) goals scored; 5) head-to-head results (only between 2 teams); 6) fewest red cards; 7) fewest yellow cards; 8) draw.

== Second stage ==
=== Group 3 ===
Pos	Team	Pld	W	D	L	GF	GA	GD	Pts	Qualification
1	Santos	6	4	2	0	9	3	+6	14	Advanced to Semifinals
2	São Paulo	6	3	2	1	7	3	+4	11	Advanced to Semifinals
3	Palmeiras	6	2	2	2	7	7	0	8	
4	São José	6	0	0	6	1	11	−10	0	

Updated to match(es) played on 11 September 2019. Source: FPF
Rules for classification: 1) points; 2) wins; 3) goal difference; 4) goals scored; 5) head-to-head results (only between 2 teams); 6) fewest red cards; 7) fewest yellow cards; 8) draw.

=== Group 4 ===
Pos	Team	Pld	W	D	L	GF	GA	GD	Pts	Qualification
1	Corinthians	6	6	0	0	22	1	+21	18	Advanced to Semifinals
2	Ferroviaria	6	4	0	2	11	8	+3	12	Advanced to Semifinals
3	Juventus	6	2	0	4	3	13	−10	6	
4	Ponte Preta	6	0	0	6	2	16	−14	0	

Updated to match(es) played on 11 September 2019. Source: FPF
Rules for classification: 1) points; 2) wins; 3) goal difference; 4) goals scored; 5) head-to-head results (only between 2 teams); 6) fewest red cards; 7) fewest yellow cards; 8) draw.

== Bracket ==
Semi-finals
Corinthians	4	5	9
Ferroviária	0	1	1
Santos	2	2	4
São Paulo	3	2	5

Finals
Corinthians	1	3	4
São Paulo	0	0	0

== Semifinals ==
=== Semi-finals ===
Team 1	Agg.	Team 2	1st leg	2nd leg
Corinthians	9 - 1	Ferroviária	4-0	5-1
Santos	4 - 5	São Paulo	2-3	2-2

18 September 2019
19:00

Ferroviária	0-4	Corinthians
		49' Pardal; 61' Millene; 75' Maiara Lisboa; 90' Victória

Fonte Luminosa, Araraquara
Referee: José Guilherme Almeida e Souza
25 September 2019
20:00

Corinthians	5-1	Ferroviária
Barrinha 17' (o.g.); Victória 56'; Millene 63', 68'; Tamires 86'		41' Luana Sartório

Parque São Jorge, São Paulo
Referee: Diego Augusto Fagundes

Corinthians won 9-1 on aggregate and advanced to the final.

14 September 2019
11:00

São Paulo	3-2	Santos
Valéria 12', 90'; Ary Borges 87'		35' Ketlen; 77' Gláucia

Pacaembu, São Paulo
Referee: Rafael Gomes Félix da Silva
21 September 2019
11:00

Santos	2-2	São Paulo
Sole Jaimes 5' (pen.); Ketlen 30'		45+2' Thaís Regina; 56' Natane Locatelli

Pacaembu, São Paulo
Referee: Danilo da Silva

São Paulo won 5-4 on aggregate and advanced to the final.

== Final ==
Team 1	Agg.	Team 2	1st leg	2nd leg
Corinthians	4 – 0	São Paulo	1-0	3–0

2 November 2019
11:00

São Paulo	0-1	Corinthians
		12' Giovanna Crivelari

Morumbi, São Paulo
Referee: Lucas Canetto Bellote
16 November 2019
11:00

Corinthians	3-0	São Paulo
Victória 4'; Juliete 48'; Millene 80'

Arena Corinthians, São Paulo
Referee: Edina Alves Batista

== Top goalscorers ==
As of 21 November 2019

Rank	Player	Club	Goals
1	(Brazil) Victória Albuquerque	Corinthians	11
2	(Brazil) Dani Ortolan	Juventus	8
2	(Brazil) Millene	Corinthians	8
4	(Brazil) Mariana Santos	Ponte Preta	7

Source: Federação Paulista de Futebol
