= Ingryd =

Brazilian footballer (born 1997)

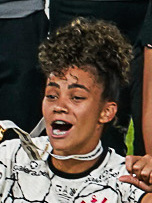
- Ingryd in 2021

Personal information
- Full name: Ingryd Fernanda Silva de Lima
- Date of birth: 24 November 1997 (age 28)
- Place of birth: Maceió, Brazil
- Height: 1.59 m (5 ft 3 in)
- Position: Midfielder

Team information
- Current team: Ferroviária

Senior career*
Years	Team	Apps	(Gls)
2014–2016	UDA-AL		
2016	São Francisco-BA	0	(0)
2017–2018	Sport Recife	28	(1)
2019–2021	Corinthians	43	(6)
2022–2023	Ferroviária	33	(1)
2024–	Palmeiras	4	(0)

International career^{‡}
2022–	Brazil	2	(0)
- * Club domestic league appearances and goals as of 23:08, 13 April 2024 (UTC) ‡ National team caps and goals as of 05:02, 6 May 2022 (UTC)

Ingryd Fernanda Silva de Lima (born 24 November 1997), simply known as Ingryd, is a Brazilian professional footballer who plays as a midfielder for Palmeiras and the Brazil women's national team.

== Club career ==
Born in Maceió, Alagoas, Ingryd began her career with União Desportiva in 2014. She subsequently played for São Francisco do Conde.

=== Sport Recife ===
Ingryd made her league debut against Grêmio Osasco Audax on 12 March 2017. She scored her first league goal against Grêmio Osasco Audax on 31 May 2017, scoring in the 11th minute.

=== Corinthians ===
Ingryd made her league debut against Sport Recife on 11 April 2019. She scored her first league goal against São José EC on 25 April 2019, scoring in the 89th minute.

On 29 December 2021, Corinthians announced the departure of Ingryd as her contract was expiring.

=== Ferroviária ===
Three days later, she was announced as the new addition of Ferroviária on a two-year deal. Ingryd made her league debut against ESMAC on 6 March 2022. She scored her first league goal against Corinthians on 1 May 2022, scoring in the 11th minute.

=== Palmeiras ===
Ingryd made her league debut against Flamengo on 16 March 2024.

== International career ==
In March 2022, Ingryd was called up to the Brazil national team by manager Pia Sundhage, for two friendlies against Spain and Hungary. She made her full international debut on 7 April, replacing Angelina in a 1–1 draw against the former.

== Career statistics ==
=== International ===
As of 6 May 2022

Brazil
Year	Apps	Goals
2022	2	0
Total	2	0

== Honours ==
=== Club ===
Corinthians

- Campeonato Paulista de Futebol Feminino: 2019, 2020, 2021
- Copa Libertadores Femenina: 2019, 2021
- Campeonato Brasileiro de Futebol Feminino Série A1: 2020, 2021

Palmeiras

- Campeonato Paulista de Futebol Feminino: 2024,2025
- Copa do Brasil de Futebol Feminino: 2025
- Brasil Ladies Cup: 2025
- Supercopa do Brasil de Futebol Feminino: 2026
