= Jheniffer =

Brazilian footballer

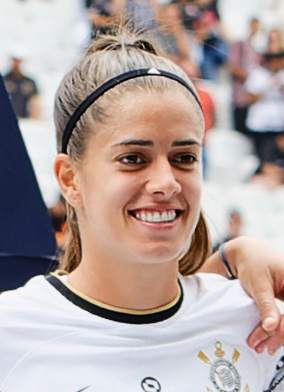
- Jheniffer in 2023

Personal information
- Full name: Jheniffer da Silva Cordinali Gouveia
- Date of birth: 6 November 2001 (age 25)
- Place of birth: São Paulo, Brazil
- Height: 1.70 m (5 ft 7 in)
- Position: Forward

Team information
- Current team: UANL
- Number: 11

Youth career
- 2016: Corinthians (futsal)
- 2017: Tiger Academia
- 2018: Audax
- 2019: Internacional

Senior career*
Years	Team	Apps	(Gls)
2019–2020	Internacional	18	(12)
2021–2024	Corinthians	131	(60)
2025–	UANL	16	(9)

International career^{‡}
2018	Brazil U17		(4)
2020	Brazil U20	3	(1)
2024–	Brazil	13	(5)
Medal record
Women's football
Representing Brazil
Olympic Games
Silver medal – second place	2024 Paris
- * Club domestic league appearances and goals as of 6:40, 2 September 2025 (UTC) ‡ National team caps and goals as of 07:43, 28 February 2026 (UTC)

Jheniffer da Silva Cordinali Gouveia (born 6 November 2001), simply known as Jheniffer, is a Brazilian professional footballer who plays as a forward for Liga MX Femenil side Tigres UANL and the Brazil women's national football team.

== Club career ==
=== Internacional ===
Born in São Paulo, Jheniffer joined Internacional in 2019, from Audax. She scored on her senior debut on 17 March 2019, coming on as a second-half substitute and scoring her side's fourth in a 5–0 Campeonato Brasileiro Série A1 away routing of Vitória das Tabocas. Six days later, she netted a brace in a 7–0 home thrashing of São Francisco do Conde.

=== Corinthians ===
On 11 January 2021, after scoring nine times in the 2020 Série A1, Jheniffer moved to Corinthians. She scored on her league debut against Napoli on 18 April 2021, scoring in the 6th minute. Her former strike partner was Adriana.

Corinthians renewed her contract in December 2022.

=== Tigres UANL ===
On 1 January 2025, Jheniffer was announced at Tigres UANL.

== International career ==
After representing Brazil at the under-17 (the former in the 2018 South American U-17 Women's Championship and the 2018 FIFA U-17 Women's World Cup, Jhennifer represented the under-20 in the 2020 South American Under-20 Women's Football Championship). She made her debut against Peru U20s on 6 March 2020. Jheniffer scored her first league goal against Paraguay U20s on 8 March 2020, scoring in the 61st minute.

Jheniffer was one of the nine Corinthians player called up by head coach Arthur Elias to the full side on 1 September 2023, for a period of trainings.

She made her debut against Canada on 6 April 2024.

On 2 July 2024, Jheniffer was called up to the Brazil squad for the 2024 Summer Olympics.

== International goals ==
No.	Date	Venue	Opponent	Score	Result	Competition
1.	4 June 2024	Arena Fonte Nova, Salvador, Brazil	Jamaica	2–0	4–0	Friendly
2.	4 June 2024	Arena Fonte Nova, Salvador, Brazil	Jamaica	3–0	4–0	Friendly
3.	28 July 2024	Parc des Princes, Nice, France	Japan	1–0	1–2	2024 Summer Olympics
4.	27 February 2026	Estadio Alejandro Morera Soto, Alajuela, Costa Rica	Costa Rica	2–0	5–2	Friendly
5.	27 February 2026	Estadio Alejandro Morera Soto, Alajuela, Costa Rica	Costa Rica	5–2	5–2	Friendly

== Honours ==
Internacional

- Campeonato Gaúcho de Futebol Feminino: 2019, 2020

Corinthians

- Campeonato Brasileiro de Futebol Feminino Série A1: 2021, 2022, 2023
- Campeonato Paulista de Futebol Feminino: 2021
- Copa Libertadores Femenina: 2021, 2023
- Supercopa do Brasil de Futebol Feminino: 2022, 2023
- Copa Paulista de Futebol Feminino: 2022

UANL

- Liga MX Femenil: Apertura 2025

Brazil U17

- South American U-17 Women's Championship: 2018

Brazil

- Summer Olympics silver medal: 2024
