= Real Brasília FC (women) =

Women's football club based in Brasília, Federal District, Brazil

Real Brasília
- Full name: Real Brasília Futebol Clube
- Nickname: Leoas do Planalto
- Founded: 2019; 7 years ago
- Ground: Defelê
- Capacity: 6,875
- President: Luís Felipe Belmonte
- Head coach: Paulo Ramos
- League: Campeonato Brasileiro Série A1; Campeonato Brasiliense
- 2025 2025: Série A1, 13th of 16; Brasiliense, 2nd of 7
Home colours	Away colours

Real Brasília Futebol Clube, commonly known as Real Brasília or the Leoas do Planalto, is a Brazilian women's Association football club, based in the city of Brasília, Federal District. It is the women's section of Real Brasília. They won the Campeonato Brasiliense de Futebol Feminino six times.

== History ==
Real Brasília's women's team started in 2019, winning the Campeonato Brasiliense de Futebol Feminino in their inaugural season. They achieved promotion to the Campeonato Brasileiro de Futebol Feminino Série A1 in the following year, after finishing fourth in the 2020 Brasileiro Série A2.

== Players ==
=== Current squad ===
As of 24 March 2025.

Note: Flags indicate national team as defined under FIFA eligibility rules; some limited exceptions apply. Players may hold more than one non-FIFA nationality.

No.	Pos.	Nation	Player
1	GK	BRA	Camila Menezes
2	DF	BRA	Laíne
3	DF	BRA	Edna
5	MF	BRA	Luciana
6	MF	CHI	Laura de la Torre
7	FW	BRA	Katy
8	MF	BRA	Maiara Santos
9	MF	BRA	Luciene Baião
12	FW	BRA	Giovana
13	DF	BRA	Renata Rosa
14	DF	BRA	Larisse
15	DF	BRA	Natália Santos
17	FW	BRA	Dani Silva
18	FW	BRA	Pitty
21	DF	BRA	Bia Macedo

No.	Pos.	Nation	Player
30	DF	VEN	Petra Cabrera
31	DF	VEN	Hilary Vergara
32	DF	BRA	Camila Santos
33	MF	BRA	Paty Alves
53	MF	BRA	Jullyana Morais
94	GK	BRA	Dani Soares
99	FW	BRA	Kim Campos
—	GK	BRA	Gabrielly
—	DF	BRA	Katielle
—	MF	BRA	Manu Balbinot
—	MF	BRA	Vitória
—	MF	URU	Victoria Rocha
—	FW	ARG	Catalina Primo
—	FW	BRA	Marcela Guedes

== Honours ==
=== Official tournaments ===
State
Competitions	Titles	Seasons
Campeonato Brasiliense	6	2019, 2020, 2021, 2022, 2023, 2024

== See also ==
- Real Brasília FC
