= Petra Cabrera (footballer) =

Venezuelan footballer (born 1990)

Personal information
- Full name: Petra del Carmen Cabrera Díaz
- Date of birth: 19 May 1990 (age 36)
- Place of birth: Carora, Venezuela
- Height: 1.68 m (5 ft 6 in)
- Position: Centre back

Team information
- Current team: Real Brasília

Senior career*
Years	Team	Apps	(Gls)
2013–2015	Trujillanos		
2016	Flor de Patria		
2017	La Equidad		
2018–2019	Flor de Patria		
2020	3B da Amazônia		
2020	Iranduba	9	(0)
2021–	Real Brasília	21	(1)

International career^{‡}
2014–	Venezuela	12	(0)
- * Club domestic league appearances and goals as of 16 May 2022 ‡ National team caps and goals as of 30 July 2018

Petra del Carmen Cabrera Díaz (born 19 May 1990) is a Venezuelan professional footballer who plays as a centre back for Brazilian Série A1 club Real Brasília FC and the Venezuela women's national team.

== International career ==
Cabrera played for Venezuela at senior level in two Copa América Femenina editions (2014 and 2018) and the 2018 Central American and Caribbean Games.
