= Elena Kössler =

Austrian footballer (born 1999)

Personal information
- Date of birth: 6 May 1999 (age 27)
- Place of birth: Austria
- Height: 1.66 m (5 ft 5 in)
- Position: Striker

Team information
- Current team: Sturm Graz
- Number: 9

Senior career*
| Years | Team | Apps | (Gls) |
- SV Haiming
| 2022 | Coritiba | | |
| 2023 | Ceará | | |
| 2023– | Sturm Graz | | |
- * Club domestic league appearances and goals

Elena Kössler (born 6 May 1999) is an Austrian footballer who plays as a striker for Sturm Graz.

== Early life ==
Kössler started playing football at the age of five.

== Education ==
Kössler attended the University of Applied Sciences Kufstein in Austria.

== Career ==
In 2023, Kössler signed for Brazilian side Ceará, where she suffered relegation to the Brazilian second tier.

== Personal life ==
Kössler has an older brother.
