= Millene =

Brazilian footballer

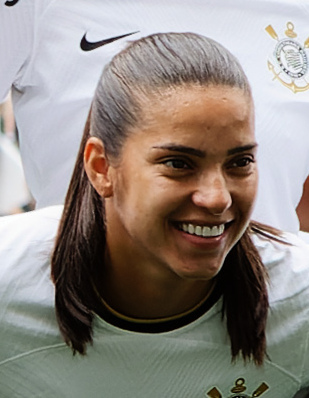
- Millene in 2023

Personal information
- Full name: Millene Karine Fernandes Arruda
- Date of birth: 13 December 1994 (age 31)
- Place of birth: Cacoal, Rondônia, Brazil
- Height: 1.61 m (5 ft 3 in)
- Position: Forward

Team information
- Current team: Corinthians

Senior career*
Years	Team	Apps	(Gls)
2012–2014	Atlético Mineiro		
2014–2016	Neves	2	(0)
2015–2017	Rio Preto	41	(18)
2018–2019	Corinthians	40	(28)
2020–2021	Wuhan Xinjiyuan	0	(0)
2020	→ Corinthians (loan)	0	(0)
2021–2022	Internacional	22	(8)
2022–	Corinthians	0	(0)

International career^{‡}
2016–	Brazil	12	(2)
- * Club domestic league appearances and goals as of 21 August 2019 ‡ National team caps and goals as of 24 November 2022

Millene Karine Fernandes Arruda (born 13 December 1994), simply known as Millene, is a Brazilian professional footballer who plays as a forward for Corinthians and the Brazil women's national team.

== International goals ==
Scores and results list Brazil's goal tally first

No.	Date	Venue	Opponent	Score	Result	Competition
1	13 April 2018	Estadio Municipal Francisco Sánchez Rumoroso, Coquimbo, Chile	Bolivia	6–0	7–0	2018 Copa América Femenina
2	12 December 2019	Arena Corinthians, São Paulo, Brazil	Mexico	5–0	6–0	Friendly game

== Honours ==
=== Club ===
Rio Preto

- Campeonato Brasileiro de Futebol Feminino: 2015
- Campeonato Paulista de Futebol Feminino: 2016, 2017

Corinthians

- Campeonato Brasileiro de Futebol Feminino: 2018

=== National team ===
- Copa América Femenina: 2018
