= Edina Alves Batista =

Brazilian association football referee

- Born: 10 January 1980 (age 46); Goioerê, Brazil

International
Years	League	Role
2016-	FIFA listed	Referee

Edina Alves Batista (born 10 January 1980) is a Brazilian association football referee.

== Career ==
She was an official at two games in April 2018 at the 2018 Copa América Femenina held in Chile.

She officiated several matches at the 2019 FIFA Women's World Cup in France, including the semi-final between England and the United States, and at the 2023 FIFA Women's World Cup in Australia.

In 2020, she was an official at the 2020 South American Under-20 Women's Football Championship held in Argentina.

On 7 February 2021, she became the first woman to officiate at a senior FIFA men's tournament, taking charge of the fifth-place match between Ulsan Hyundai and Al-Duhail at the 2020 FIFA Club World Cup. On 3 March 2021, she became the first female referee to take charge of a men's derby match between Corinthians and Palmeiras in Brazil.

On 9 January 2023, FIFA appointed her to the officiating pool for the 2023 FIFA Women's World Cup in Australia and New Zealand.

In April 2024, FIFA appointed her to the officiating pool for the 2024 Paris Olympic Games.

On 31 March 2025, UEFA announced that she was selected as a match official in the Women's Euro’s over the summer, with the experienced Brazilian taking charge of the opening match in the UEFA Women's Euro 2025 Group C.
