= Victória (footballer) =

Brazilian footballer

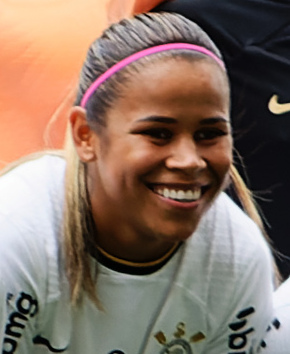
- Victória in 2023

Personal information
- Full name: Victória Kristine Albuquerque de Miranda
- Date of birth: 14 March 1998 (age 28)
- Place of birth: Brasília, Brazil
- Height: 1.65 m (5 ft 5 in)
- Positions: Midfielder; forward

Team information
- Current team: Corinthians
- Number: 17

Senior career*
Years	Team	Apps	(Gls)
2013	ASCOOP	2	(1)
2015–2018	Minas ICESP	8+	(8+)
2018	→ Osasco Audax (loan)	3	(1)
2019–2021	Corinthians	55	(24)
2022	Madrid CFF	14	(2)
2022–	Corinthians	29	(13)

International career^{‡}
2016–2018	Brazil U20	10+	(4)
2019–	Brazil	4	(1)
- * Club domestic league appearances and goals as of 01:14, 1 May 2024 ‡ National team caps and goals as of 15 December 2019

Victória Kristine Albuquerque de Miranda (born 14 March 1998), simply known as Victória or Vic Albuquerque, is a Brazilian professional footballer who plays as a midfielder for Corinthians and the Brazil women's national team.

== Career ==
=== ASCOOP ===
Victória scored on her league debut against Foz Cataratas on 25 September 2013, scoring a penalty in the 15th minute.

=== First spell at Corinthians ===
Victória was announced at Corinthians. She made her league debut against Ponte Preta on 16 March 2019. Victória scored her first league goal against Vitória das Taboscas on 19 May 2019, scoring in the 6th minute. She scored a hattrick against Minas ICESP on 27 July 2019. Victória scored another hattrick against São José on 14 May 2021.

She announced she was leaving Corinthians in early 2022.

=== Madrid ===
Victória was announced at Madrid. She made her league debut against Eibar on 30 January 2022. Victória scored her first league goal against Real Betis on 17 April 2022, scoring in the 80th minute.

=== Second spell at Corinthians ===
Victória returned to the club in 2022. She made her league debut against ESMAC on 4 August 2022. Victória scored against Real Brasília on 14 August 2022, scoring a penalty in the 54th minute.

== International career ==
Victória represented Brazil at the 2018 South American U-20 Women's Championship and two editions of the FIFA U-20 Women's World Cup (2016 and 2018). She made her senior debut in 2019 against England on 5 October 2019. Victória scored her first international goal against Mexico on 15 December 2019, scoring in the 75th minute.

=== International goals ===
Scores and results list Brazil's goal tally first

No.	Date	Venue	Opponent	Score	Result	Competition
1	15 December 2019	Estádio Fonte Luminosa, Araraquara, Brazil	Mexico	4–0	4–0	Friendly game

== Honours ==
=== Club ===
Corinthians

- Copa Libertadores Femenina: 2019
- Campeonato Paulista feminino 2019

=== Individual ===
- Outstanding New Player of the Campeonato Brasileiro 2019
- Best Midfielder of the Campeonato Brasileiro 2019
- Bola de Ouro: 2024
- Bola de Prata: 2021, 2023, 2024
