= SC Corinthians Paulista (women) =

Brazilian women's football club

Corinthians
- Full name: Sport Club Corinthians Paulista Futebol Feminino
- Nickname: Timão (The Great Team)
- Founded: 1997; 29 years ago 2016 (re-founded)
- Ground: Parque São Jorge, Tatuapé, São Paulo, Brazil
- Capacity: 10,000
- Head coach: Julia Passero (caretaker)
- League: Campeonato Brasileiro Série A1; Campeonato Paulista
- 2025 2025: Série A1, 1st of 16 (champions); Paulista, 2nd of 8
- Website: www.corinthians.com.br
Home colours	Away colours	Third colours

Sport Club Corinthians Paulista, commonly known as Corinthians, is a professional women's association football club based in São Paulo, Brazil. Founded in 1997, the team is affiliated with Federação Paulista de Futebol and play their home games at Parque São Jorge. The team colors, reflected in their logo and uniform, are white and black. They play in the top tier of women's football in Brazil, the Campeonato Brasileiro de Futebol Feminino, and in the Campeonato Paulista de Futebol Feminino, the first division of the traditional in-state competition.

== History ==
=== First spell ===
In 1994, Corinthians co-opted a promotional futsal team of teenaged models, captained by a 15-year-old Milene Domingues.

The Brazilian Football Confederation (CBF) successfully encouraged Corinthians and its other leading clubs to form female teams after the national women's team's performance exceeded expectations at the 1996 Olympics. After an unassuming 11 years, Corinthians' women's team was scrapped ahead of the 2009 season. The unhappy players were threatening to sue the management, as the only player with a legitimate contract was Cristiane Rozeira, whose salary had been paid by a local hospital.

=== Corinthians/Audax era ===
In 2015 Corinthians decided to return to women's football and agreed a partnership with Grêmio Osasco Audax Esporte Clube, whose women's section had debuted in the 2015 Campeonato Paulista. The collaboration was confirmed in early 2016. A draft in February 2016 assigned Brazil women's national football team players Letícia and Rafinha to the combined Corinthians Audax team, who went on to win the 2016 Copa do Brasil de Futebol Feminino.

Corinthians Audax won the 2017 Copa Libertadores Femenina by beating Colo-Colo of Chile on a penalty shootout. Shortly thereafter Corinthians announced that they were withdrawing from the agreement with Audax and would enter the Campeonato Brasileiro de Futebol Feminino themselves. A change in CONMEBOL rules meant that from 2019 clubs wishing to participate in continental competitions had to run their own women's teams.

=== Second spell: the formation of a dynasty ===
The sole Corinthians team created a dynasty: extended their total of Copa Libertadores Femenina to six (2017, 2019, 2021, 2023, 2024 and 2025), won seven national championships in eight finals (2018, 2020, 2021, 2022, 2023, 2024 and 2025), four Campeonato Paulista (2019, 2020, 2021, 2023) and three Supercopa do Brasil Feminina (the inaugural in 2022 and the 2023 and 2024 editions).

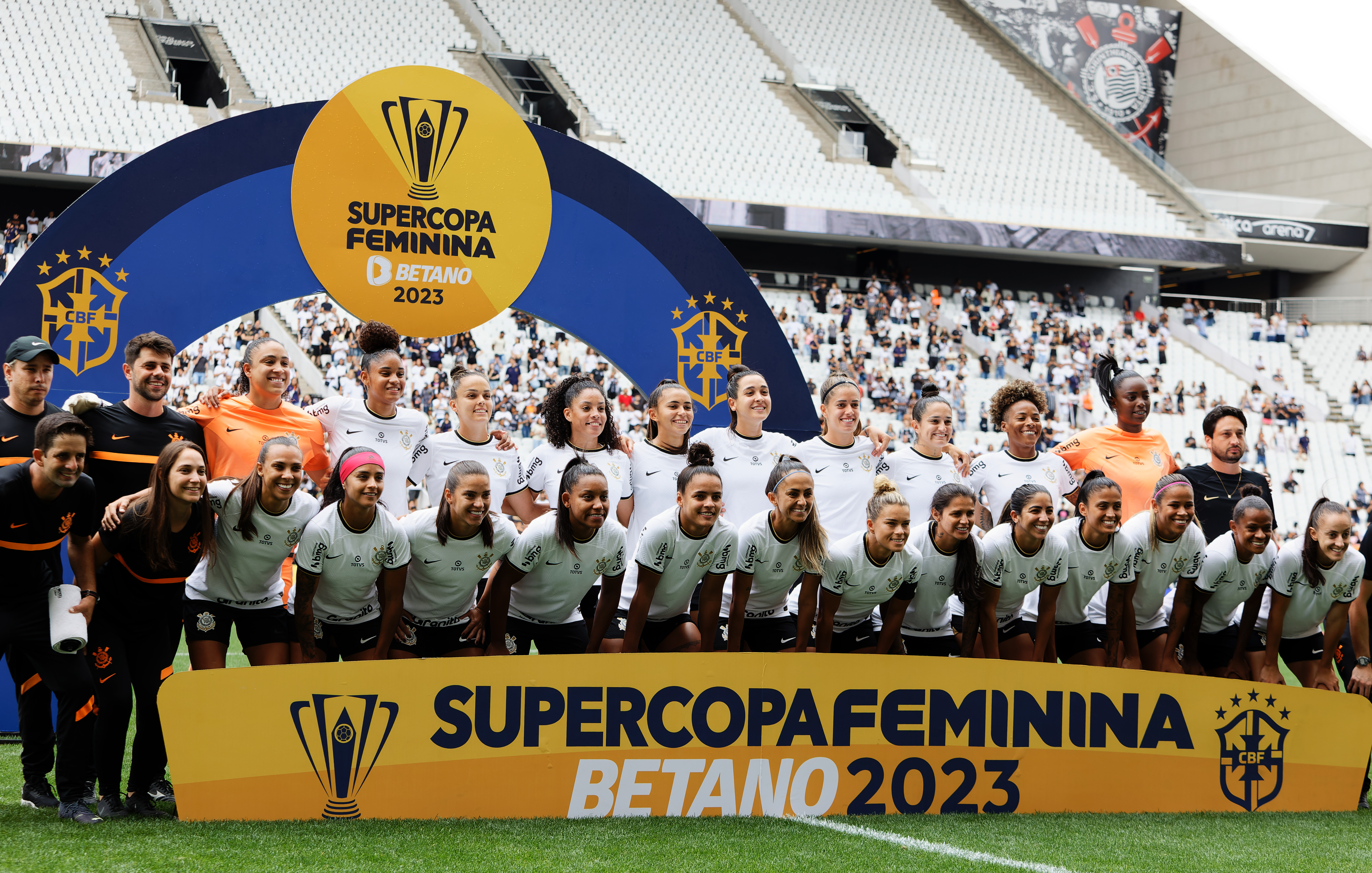
Roster for the 2023 Supercopa do Brasil de Futebol Feminino

== Players ==
=== Current roster ===
As of 2 September 2026

Note: Flags indicate national team as defined under FIFA eligibility rules; some limited exceptions apply. Players may hold more than one non-FIFA nationality.

No.	Pos.	Nation	Player
1	GK	BRA	Nicole
2	DF	ARG	Agustina Barroso
4	DF	BRA	Thaís Regina
5	DF	BRA	Thaís Ferreira
7	MF	COL	Gisela Robledo
8	FW	BRA	Andressa Alves
9	FW	BRA	Jhonson
10	MF	BRA	Gabi Zanotti (captain)
11	FW	BRA	Ariel Godoi
12	GK	BRA	Letícia
13	FW	BRA	Ivana Fuso
17	FW	BRA	Victória
19	MF	BRA	Letícia Monteiro
20	MF	COL	Paola García
22	DF	BRA	Juliete

No.	Pos.	Nation	Player
23	DF	BRA	Gi Fernandes
25	FW	URU	Belén Aquino
27	MF	BRA	Duda Sampaio
29	FW	BRA	Rhaizza
30	FW	BRA	Jaqueline
31	MF	VEN	Dayana Rodríguez
32	GK	BRA	Rillary
33	DF	BRA	Duda Mineira
36	DF	BRA	Rafa Rocha
37	DF	BRA	Tamires
41	GK	BRA	Ana Morganti
77	FW	BRA	Carol Nogueira
88	MF	BRA	Ana Vitória
99	DF	BRA	Érika

=== Out on loan ===
Note: Flags indicate national team as defined under FIFA eligibility rules; some limited exceptions apply. Players may hold more than one non-FIFA nationality.

No.	Pos.	Nation	Player
—	MF	BRA	Nicole Marussi (on loan to Juventude until 31 December 2026)
—	MF	BRA	Ellen (on loan to Botafogo until 31 December 2026)
—	MF	BRA	Juliana Passari (on loan to Alianza Lima until 31 December 2026)

=== Former players ===
For details of current and former players, see Category:SC Corinthians Paulista (women) players.

== Management team ==
Position	Name
Head coach	(Brazil) Julia Passero (caretaker)

== Honours ==
=== Official tournaments ===
Continental
Competitions	Titles	Seasons
Copa Libertadores Femenina	6	2017, 2019, 2021, 2023, 2024, 2025
National
Competitions	Titles	Seasons
Campeonato Brasileiro Série A1	7	2018, 2020, 2021, 2022, 2023, 2024, 2025
Copa do Brasil	1	2016
Supercopa do Brasil	3	2022, 2023, 2024
State
Competitions	Titles	Seasons
Campeonato Paulista	4^{s}	2019, 2020, 2021, 2023
Copa Paulista	1	2022

- record
- ^{s} shared record

Note

1. In 2016, SC Corinthians and Grêmio Audax formed a partnership in women's football. Corinthians entered as a sponsor and Grêmio Audax with the players and the registry. In practice, the winner of the 2016 Copa do Brasil and 2017 Libertadores Femenina is Grêmio Audax.

=== Friendly tournaments ===
- Rosario Cup (1): 2018

=== Youth team ===
- Campeonato Brasileiro Feminino Sub-17 (1): 2025
- Campeonato Brasileiro Feminino Sub-16 (1): 2021
- Campeonato Paulista Sub-15 (1): 2023
- Festival Paulista Sub-14 (1): 2023

== See also ==
- SC Corinthians Paulista
- SC Corinthians Paulista (futsal)
- SC Corinthians Paulista (beach soccer)
- SC Corinthians Paulista (basketball)
- Corinthians Steamrollers (american football)
- SC Corinthians Paulista (Superleague Formula team)
- List of SC Corinthians Paulista (women) seasons
