= Parque São Jorge =

Football stadium in Brazil

Coordinates: 23°31′36.60″S 46°34′6.49″W

Estádio Alfredo Schürig
- Parque São Jorge
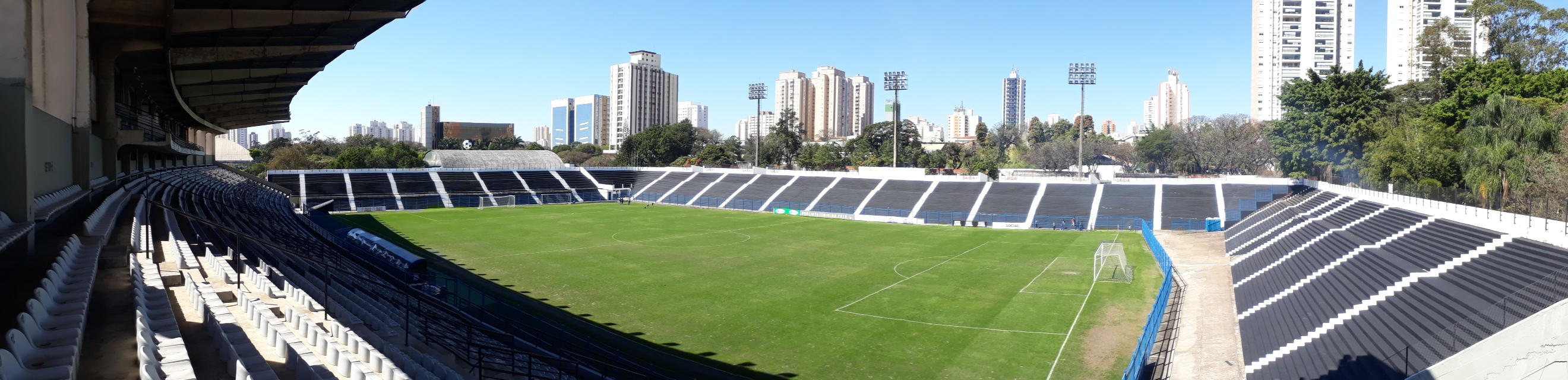
- Interactive map of Estádio Alfredo Schürig
- Full name: Estádio Alfredo Schürig
- Location: São Paulo, São Paulo, Brazil
- Owner: Sport Club Corinthians Paulista
- Capacity: 18,500
- Surface: Natural grass
- Record attendance: 27,384
- Field size: 105 by 68 metres (114.8 yd × 74.4 yd)

Construction
- Built: 1928
- Opened: July 22, 1928

Tenants
- Corinthians; Corinthians Rugby

The Estádio Alfredo Schürig, most commonly known as Estádio Parque São Jorge, or Fazendinha, is a football stadium inaugurated on July 22, 1928 in São Paulo, Brazil. It can hold up to 18,500 people. The stadium is owned by Sport Club Corinthians Paulista. Its formal name honors Alfredo Schürig, president of Corinthians from 1931 to 1933. Fazendinha means Little Farm.

== History ==
The stadium was inaugurated on July 22, 1928, and became the home ground of Corinthians in the beginning of the 1940s, when Estádio do Pacaembu was built. In 1963, the stadium was one of the 1963 Pan American Games venues, hosted in São Paulo city. During the Pan American Games, the Brazil national team beat the American counterparts 10–0. Due to Fazendinha's low capacity, Corinthians has been playing in Pacaembu Stadium since the 1950s. During a short time, Campeonato Paulista and Copa do Brasil matches were again played at the stadium as result of a reformation done in 1992 that grew its capacity.

The inaugural match was played on July 22, 1928, when Corinthians and América drew 2-2. The first goal of the stadium was scored by Corinthians' De Maria.

The stadium's attendance record currently stands at 27,384, set on November 4, 1962 when Santos beat Corinthians 2–1.
