= Campeonato Brasileiro de Futebol Feminino Série A1 =

Women's football league in Brazil

Campeonato Brasileiro de Futebol Feminino
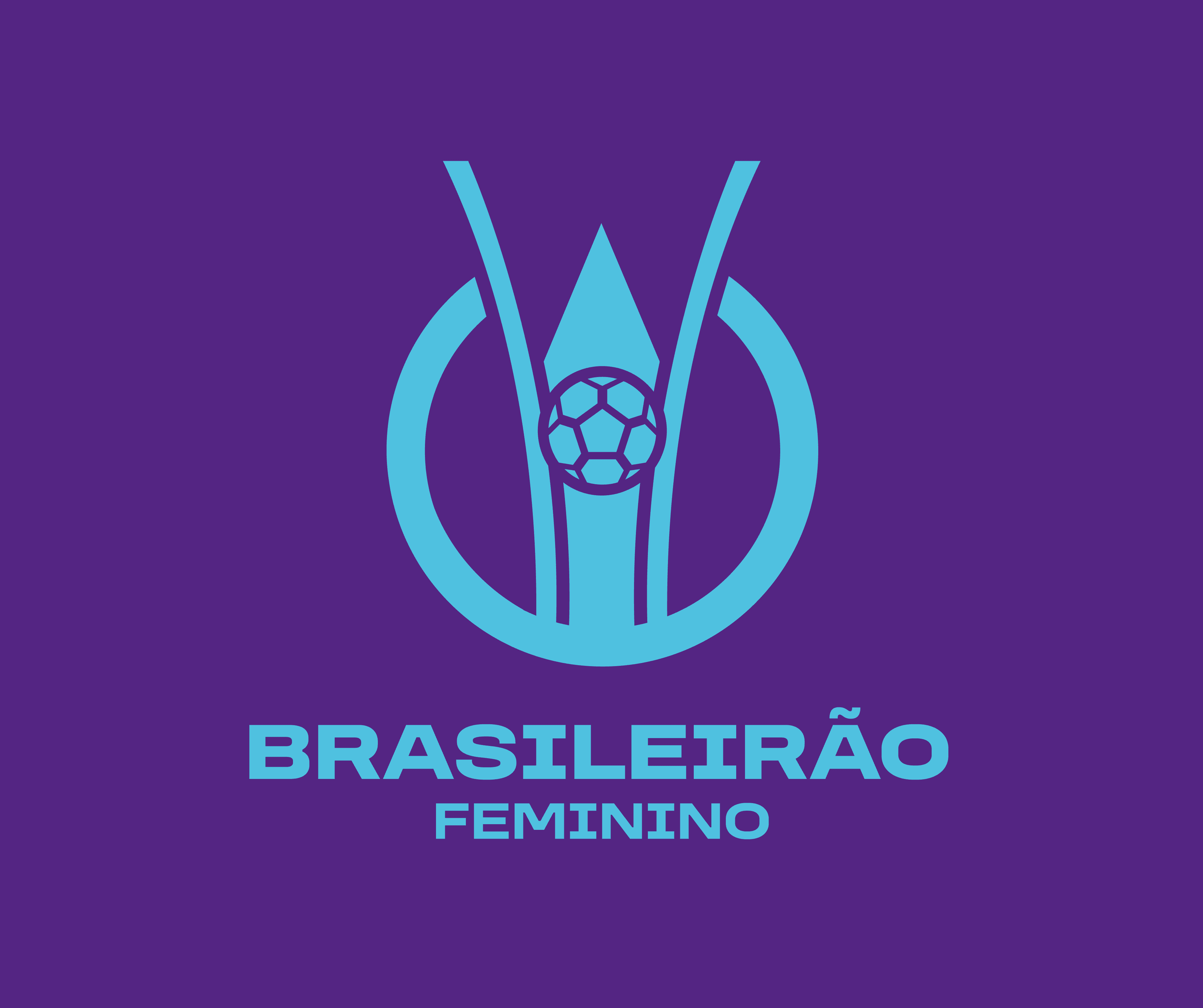
- Organising body: CBF
- Founded: 18 September 2013
- First season: 2013
- Country: Brazil
- Confederation: CONMEBOL
- Number of clubs: 18 (since 2026)
- Level on pyramid: 1
- Relegation to: Campeonato Brasileiro de Futebol Feminino Série A2
- Domestic cup: Copa do Brasil Feminina Supercopa Feminina
- International cup: Copa Libertadores Femenina
- Current champions: São Paulo (1st title) (2026)
- Most championships: Corinthians (7 titles)
- Broadcaster(s): TV Globo; TV Brasil sportv N Sports; CBF TV getv UOL
- Website: Official website
- Current: 2026 edition

The Campeonato Brasileiro de Futebol Feminino (Brazilian Women's National Championship), also known as Brasileirão Feminino, is an annual Brazilian women's club football tournament organized by the Confederação Brasileira de Futebol, or CBF. It is the country's premier women's football competition and the first professional women's league in the country.

== History ==
Brazil had a tournament called Taça Brasil de Futebol Feminino (Women's Football Brazil Trophy, in English) played between 1983, and 1989, followed by Torneio Nacional (1990 and 1991) and Taça Brasil de Clubes (1993). A competition also named Campeonato Brasileiro de Futebol Feminino which was a forerunner of the current tournament, was founded in 1994, ran that season, was cancelled in 1995 and re-instated in 1996 being played until 2001. When it folded, the country was left with only state football leagues for women available in few states and no national tournament.

In 2006, another national tournament attempt was made, organized by the Amateur Paulista Football Federation (Federação Paulista de Futebol Amador, FPFA) and the National Football League (Liga Nacional de Futebol, LINAF), it was called Taça Brasil de Futebol Feminino. The tournament was contested in Jaguariúna, São Paulo state on its first year (2006) and in multiple towns of Rio de Janeiro state on its second year (2007).

In 2007, CBF created the Copa do Brasil de Futebol Feminino, a national cup tournament, and in 2013, a national league competition was founded, the Campeonato Brasileiro de Futebol Feminino, with a short three-month season initially. In 2015, teams that reached the knock-out stage got a financial support of about USD 3,000 for a home-and-away round plus air or road transport cost paid.

== Format ==
Up to 2016, 20 teams took part in the competition. In the first round there were four groups of five teams that play each other within the group once. The top two of each group move on. In the second round eight teams were put into two groups of four. Teams play each other twice and the top two teams move to the two leg semi-finals, with the winners moving to the two leg final.

In 2017 the league was restructured and the first level, now called Série A1, has 16 teams in one group. After playing each other the top 8 teams move to the play-offs. There is also relegation/promotion to the new Série A2, which will also have 16 teams split in two groups of eight teams. In 2021, the Série A3 was created with 32 teams taking part.

== List of winners ==
Key
Finals decided on away goals
Finals decided by a penalty shoot-out

List of Campeonato Brasileiro finals
Year	Home team	Score	Away team	Venue	Attendance
2013	São José	2–2	Centro Olímpico	Estádio Joe Sanchez (ADC GM), São José dos Campos	
2013	Centro Olímpico	2–1	São José	Estádio Municipal Giglio Portugal Pichinin, São Bernardo do Campo	
2013	Centro Olímpico won 4–1 on points.				
2014	Kindermann	0–3	Ferroviária	Estádio Municipal Doutor Carlos Alberto da Costa Neves, Caçador	
2014	Ferroviária	5–3	Kindermann	Arena Fonte Luminosa, Araraquara	
2014	Ferroviária won 6–0 on points.				
2015	Rio Preto	1–0	São José	Estádio Anísio Haddad, São José do Rio Preto	
2015	São José	1–1	Rio Preto	Estádio Martins Pereira, São José dos Campos	
2015	Rio Preto won 4–1 on points.				
2016	Flamengo	0–1	Rio Preto	Estádio de Los Larios, Duque de Caxias	
2016	Rio Preto	1–2	Flamengo	Estádio Anísio Haddad, São José do Rio Preto	
2016	Tied 3–3 on points. Flamengo won on away goals.				
2017	Santos	2–0	Corinthians	Vila Belmiro, Santos	
2017	Corinthians	0–1	Santos	Arena Barueri, Barueri	
2017	Santos won 6–0 on points.				
2018	Rio Preto	0–1	Corinthians	Estádio Anísio Haddad, São José do Rio Preto	
2018	Corinthians	4–0	Rio Preto	Parque São Jorge, São Paulo	
2018	Corinthians won 6–0 on points.				
2019	Ferroviária	1–1	Corinthians	Arena Fonte Luminosa, Araraquara	
2019	Corinthians	0–0	Ferroviária	Parque São Jorge, São Paulo	
2019	Tied 2–2 on points. Ferroviária won 4–2 on penalties.				
2020	Avaí/Kindermann	0–0	Corinthians	Estádio da Ressacada, Florianópolis	
2020	Corinthians	4–2	Avaí/Kindermann	Neo Química Arena, São Paulo	
2020	Corinthians won 4–1 on points.				
2021	Palmeiras	0–1	Corinthians	Allianz Parque, São Paulo	
2021	Corinthians	3–1	Palmeiras	Neo Química Arena, São Paulo	
2021	Corinthians won 6–0 on points.				
2022	Internacional	1–1	Corinthians	Beira Rio, Porto Alegre	36,330
2022	Corinthians	4–1	Internacional	Neo Química Arena, São Paulo	41,070
2022	Corinthians won 4–1 on points.				
2023	Ferroviária	0–0	Corinthians	Fonte Luminosa, Araraquara	9,899
2023	Corinthians	2–1	Ferroviária	Neo Química Arena, São Paulo	42,326
2023	Corinthians won 4–1 on points.				
2024	São Paulo	1–3	Corinthians	MorumBIS, São Paulo	28,420
2024	Corinthians	2–0	São Paulo	Neo Química Arena, São Paulo	44,136
2024	Corinthians won 6–0 on points.				
2025	Cruzeiro	2–2	Corinthians	Independência, Belo Horizonte	19,165
2025	Corinthians	1–0	Cruzeiro	Neo Química Arena, São Paulo	41,130
2025	Corinthians won 4–1 on points.				
2026	Corinthians	1–2	São Paulo	Neo Química Arena, São Paulo	21,451
2026	São Paulo	1–1	Corinthians	Morumbi, São Paulo	49,405
2026	São Paulo won 4–1 on points.				

== Performances ==
=== By club ===
Team	Winners	Runners-up	Years won	Years runner-up
(São Paulo (state)) Corinthians	7	3	2018, 2020, 2021, 2022, 2023, 2024, 2025	2017, 2019, 2026
(São Paulo (state)) Ferroviária	2	1	2014, 2019	2023
(São Paulo (state)) Rio Preto	1	2	2015	2016, 2018
(São Paulo (state)) São Paulo	1	1	2026	2024
(São Paulo (state)) Centro Olímpico	1	0	2013	
(Rio de Janeiro (state)) Flamengo	1	0	2016	
(São Paulo (state)) Santos	1	0	2017	
(São Paulo (state)) São José	0	2		2013, 2015
(Santa Catarina (state)) Kindermann (Note: Kindermann had a partnership with Avaí for the 2020 season. Kindermann ceased operations in 2021 and Avaí remained with the project ever since.)	0	1		2014
(Santa Catarina (state)) Avaí/Kindermann	0	1		2020
(São Paulo (state)) Palmeiras	0	1		2021
(Rio Grande do Sul) Internacional	0	1		2022
(Minas Gerais) Cruzeiro	0	1		2025

=== By state ===
State	Winners	Runners-up	Winning clubs	Runners-up
São Paulo	13	10	Corinthians (7), Ferroviária (2), Centro Olímpico (1), Rio Preto (1), Santos (1), São Paulo (1)	Corinthians (3), São José (2), Rio Preto (2), Palmeiras (1), Ferroviária (1), São Paulo (1)
Rio de Janeiro	1	0	Flamengo (1)	
Santa Catarina	0	2		Kindermann (1), Avaí/Kindermann (1)
Rio Grande do Sul	0	1		Internacional (1)
Minas Gerais	0	1		Cruzeiro (1)

== Top scorers ==
Season	Topscorer	Team	Goals
2013	(Brazil) Gabi Zanotti	Centro Olímpico	12
2014	(Brazil) Raquel	Ferroviária	16
2015	(Brazil) Gabi Nunes	Centro Olímpico	14
2016	(Brazil) Millene	Rio Preto	10
2017	(Argentina) Sole Jaimes	Santos	18
2018	(Brazil) Danyelle	Flamengo	15
2019	(Brazil) Millene	Corinthians	19
2020	(Brazil) Carla Nunes	Palmeiras	12
2021	(Brazil) Bia Zaneratto	Palmeiras	13
2022	(Brazil) Cristiane	Santos	13
2023	(Brazil) Amanda Gutierres	Palmeiras	13
2024	(Brazil) Amanda Gutierres	Palmeiras	15
2025	(Brazil) Amanda Gutierres	Palmeiras	17
2026	(Brazil) Marília	Cruzeiro	11
Source: CBF

== Relegated teams ==
Year	Teams
2017	Grêmio, Vitória (BA)
2018 (Note: Note: Rio Preto withdrew from 2019 Série A1 and was replaced by Internacional.)	Rio Preto, Portuguesa, Pinheirense
2019	Vitória (PE), Foz Cataratas, São Francisco (BA), Sport Recife
2020	Iranduba, Grêmio Audax, Ponte Preta, Vitória (BA)
2021	Botafogo, Minas Brasília, Napoli, Bahia
2022	São José (SP), ESMAC, Red Bull Bragantino, CRESSPOM
2023	Bahia, Athletico Paranaense, Real Ariquemes, Ceará
2024	Botafogo, Santos, Avaí/Kindermann, Atlético Mineiro
2025	3B, Sport Recife
2026	Vitória (BA), Botafogo

== See also ==
- Sport in Brazil
  - Football in Brazil
    - Women's football in Brazil
- Campeonato Brasileiro Série A2, the second division of women's Brazilian football
- Campeonato Brasileiro Série A3, the third division of women's Brazilian football
- Copa do Brasil de Futebol Feminino
- Copa Libertadores Femenina
