= 2023 Sport Club Corinthians Paulista (women) season =

Corinthians (women) 2023 football season

Corinthians
2023 season
- President: Duílio Monteiro Alves
- Manager: Arthur Elias (until 21 October); Rodrigo Iglesias (interim, from 1 November)
- Stadium: Parque São Jorge / Neo Química Arena
- Série A1: Winners
- Supercopa do Brasil: Winners
- Campeonato Paulista: Winners
- Copa Libertadores: Winners
- Top goalscorer: League: Jheniffer (11); All: Victória (23)
- Highest home attendance: 42,556 vs. Ferroviária (10 September 2023)
- Lowest home attendance: 218 vs. São Bernardo (14 September 2023)
Home colors	Away colors	Third colors

The 2023 season was the 21st season in the history of Sport Club Corinthians Paulista (women). In addition to the domestic league, Corinthians participated in this season's editions of the Supercopa do Brasil, Copa Libertadores Femenina and Campeonato Paulista. There was a mid-season break due to the 2023 FIFA Women's World Cup in July-August.

== Background ==
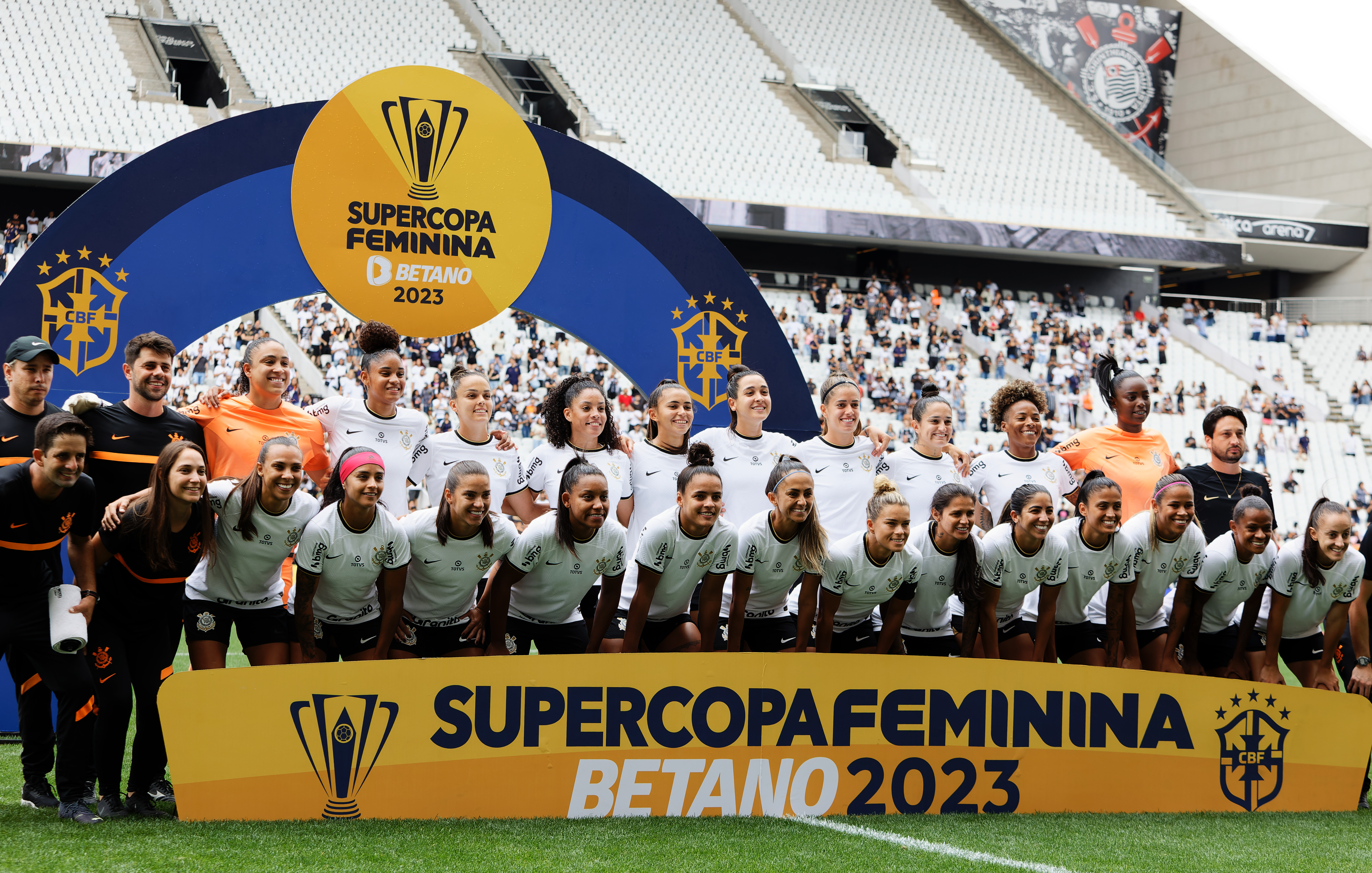
Corinthians' squad for the Supercopa do Brasil match against Flamengo/Marinha.

=== Kits ===
- Home (13 April 2023 onward): White shirt, black shorts and white socks with a yellow horizontal stripe;
- Away (13 April 2023 onward): Black shirt with white stripes, white shorts and black socks;
- Third (20 September 2023 onward): Yellow shirt, yellow shorts and yellow socks;
- Fourth (28 May 2023 onward): Beige shirt, black shorts and black socks.

=== Previous Kits ===
- Home (Until 12 April 2023): White shirt, black shorts and white socks;
- Away (Until 12 April 2023): Black shirt, white shorts and black socks;
- Third (Until 19 September 2023): Beige shirt with shodô stripes, black shorts and beige socks with shodô stripes.

== Squad ==
As of 17 August 2023

Note: Flags indicate national team as defined under FIFA eligibility rules; some limited exceptions apply. Players may hold more than one non-FIFA nationality.

No.	Pos.	Nation	Player
1	GK	BRA	Tainá
2	DF	BRA	Katiuscia
3	DF	BRA	Tarciane
4	DF	BRA	Giovanna Campiolo
5	MF	BRA	Luana
6	DF	BRA	Isabela
7	MF	BRA	Grazi (captain)
8	MF	BRA	Diany
9	FW	BRA	Jheniffer
10	MF	BRA	Gabi Zanotti
12	GK	BRA	Letícia
13	DF	BRA	Carol Tavares
14	FW	BRA	Millene
15	FW	BRA	Miriã
17	FW	BRA	Victória
18	MF	BRA	Gabi Portilho

No.	Pos.	Nation	Player
20	MF	BRA	Mariza
21	DF	BRA	Paulinha
22	FW	BRA	Fernanda
24	GK	BRA	Kemelli
27	MF	BRA	Duda Sampaio
28	MF	BRA	Ju Ferreira
30	FW	BRA	Jaqueline
37	DF	BRA	Tamires
55	MF	BRA	Gabi Morais
70	FW	BRA	Ellen
71	DF	BRA	Yasmim
74	DF	BRA	Andressa
77	FW	BRA	Carol Nogueira
80	GK	BRA	Mary Camilo
99	DF	BRA	Érika

== Managerial changes ==
On September 1, it was announced that Arthur Elias was the new manager of the Brazil women's national football team. He will manage both Corinthians and Brazil until the end of the 2023 Copa Libertadores Femenina, before dedicating exclusively to Brazil.

On November 1, current assistant manager Rodrigo Iglesias was announced as interim manager until the end of the season. Iglesias is also part of Elias' staff at the women's national team and has already coached the club in 12 matches, winning 11 of them.

Manager	Signed from	Date of signing	Date of departure	Signed with	Source
(Brazil) Arthur Elias	(Brazil) Centro Olímpico	2016	22 October 2023	Brazil (women)	
(Brazil) Rodrigo Iglesias	Assistant coach	1 November 2023	27 November 2023	—	

== Transfers ==
=== Transfers in ===
#	Position:	Player	Transferred from	Fee	Date	Team	Source
6	DF	(Brazil) Isabela	(Brazil) Internacional	Free transfer (End of contract)	23 December 2022	First team	
77	FW	(Brazil) Carol Nogueira	(Brazil) São Paulo	Free transfer (End of contract)	26 December 2022	First team	
27	MF	(Brazil) Duda Sampaio	(Brazil) Internacional	Free transfer (End of contract)	27 December 2022	First team	
22	FW	(Brazil) Fernanda	(Brazil) Santos	Free transfer (End of contract)	28 December 2022	First team	
13	DF	(Brazil) Carol Tavares	(Brazil) Ferroviária	Free transfer (End of contract)	30 December 2022	First team	
28	MF	(Brazil) Ju Ferreira	(Brazil) Internacional	Free transfer (End of contract)	31 December 2022	First team	
80	GK	(Brazil) Mary Camilo	(Brazil) Botafogo	Free transfer (End of contract)	7 January 2023	First team	
26	MF	(Brazil) Nicole Marussi	(Brazil) Santos	Free transfer (End of contract)	28 January 2023	Academy	
	FW	(Brazil) Kamile Pavarin	(Brazil) Internacional	Free transfer (End of contract)	30 January 2023	Academy	

=== Loans in ===
#	Position:	Player	Loaned from	Date	Loan expires	Team	Source
40	FW	(Brazil) Jhonson	(Brazil) Toledo	27 January 2023	31 December 2024	Academy	

=== Transfers out ===
#	Position	Player	Transferred to	Fee	Date	Team	Source
77	FW	(Brazil) Bianca Gomes	(Brazil) Santos	Free transfer (End of contract)	21 December 2022	First team	
26	DF	(Brazil) Áhlice Guedes	(Brazil) Internacional	Free transfer (End of contract)	27 December 2022	Academy	
6	DF	(Brazil) Juliete	(Brazil) Palmeiras	Free transfer (End of contract)	29 December 2022	First team	
19	FW	(Brazil) Mylena	(Portugal) Famalicão	Free transfer (Rescinded contract)	11 January 2023	First team	
16	FW	(Brazil) Adriana	(United States) Orlando Pride	US$100,000 (~R$513,000)	12 January 2023	First team	
97	GK	(Brazil) Natascha Honegger	(Switzerland) Basel	Free transfer (Rescinded contract)	2 February 2023	First team	
11	MF	(Colombia) Liana Salazar	(Colombia) Santa Fe	Free transfer (Rescinded contract)	16 March 2023	First team	
	FW	(Brazil) Kamile Pavarin	Free agent	Rescinded contract	21 July 2023	Academy	
23	GK	(Brazil) Paty	(Malta) Swieqi United	Free transfer (Rescinded contract)	17 August 2023	First team	

=== Loans out ===
#	Position:	Player	Loaned to	Date	Loan expires	Team	Source
22	GK	(Brazil) Kemelli	(Brazil) Cruzeiro	17 January 2023	31 December 2023 (Cancelled on 18 July 2023)	First team	

== Squad statistics ==
No.	Pos.	Name	Campeonato Brasileiro		Supercopa do Brasil		Campeonato Paulista		Copa Libertadores		Total		Discipline	
No.	Pos.	Name	Apps	Goals	Apps	Goals	Apps	Goals	Apps	Goals	Apps	Goals	Yellow card	Red card
1	GK	(Brazil) Tainá	5	0	0	0	4	0	0	0	9	0	0	0
2	DF	(Brazil) Katiuscia	14 (4)	0	0 (2)	0	8	0	4 (1)	0	26 (7)	0	1	0
3	DF	(Brazil) Tarciane	12 (3)	2	3	0	10 (1)	2	5	0	30 (4)	4	12	1
4	DF	(Brazil) Giovanna Campiolo	5 (1)	1	0	0	5 (4)	0	0	0	10 (5)	1	3	1
5	MF	(Brazil) Luana	15 (1)	3	0 (1)	0	6 (1)	1	4 (2)	0	25 (5)	4	7	0
6	DF	(Brazil) Isabela	6 (7)	2	1 (1)	0	3 (4)	0	1 (1)	0	11 (13)	2	1	0
7	MF	(Brazil) Grazi	0 (5)	1	0	0	6	7	0	0	6 (5)	8	1	0
8	MF	(Brazil) Diany	5 (9)	3	3	1	6 (5)	0	0	0	14 (14)	4	3	0
9	FW	(Brazil) Jheniffer	13 (6)	11	2 (1)	0	4 (7)	4	4 (2)	1	24 (15)	16	1	0
10	MF	(Brazil) Gabi Zanotti	9	5	0	0	7 (3)	0	4 (1)	1	20 (4)	6	2	0
12	GK	(Brazil) Letícia	14	0	3	0	6	0	6	0	29	0	3	0
13	DF	(Brazil) Carol Tavares	1 (6)	0	2	0	5 (1)	1	0	0	8 (7)	1	2	0
14	FW	(Brazil) Millene	8 (10)	3	3 (1)	2	10 (3)	6	5 (1)	6	26 (15)	18	5	0
15	FW	(Brazil) Miriã	0 (3)	0	0	0	2 (7)	4	0	0	2 (10)	4	0	1
17	FW	(Brazil) Victória	12 (6)	9	2 (1)	1	10 (3)	10	2 (4)	3	28 (14)	23	4	0
18	MF	(Brazil) Gabi Portilho	13 (3)	3	3	0	5 (2)	2	4 (2)	0	25 (7)	5	0	1
20	MF	(Brazil) Mariza	14 (3)	1	1	0	10	3	5	0	30 (3)	4	4	0
21	DF	(Brazil) Paulinha	4 (3)	0	0	0	7 (4)	1	1 (2)	1	12 (9)	2	0	0
22	FW	(Brazil) Fernanda	5 (8)	3	0 (1)	0	8 (4)	3	1 (4)	2	14 (17)	8	2	0
24	GK	(Brazil) Kemelli	0	0	0	0	2	0	0	0	2	0	0	0
25	FW	(Brazil) Júlia Brito	0	0	0	0	0 (2)	0	0	0	0 (2)	0	0	0
26	MF	(Brazil) Nicole Marussi	0	0	0	0	0 (3)	0	0	0	0 (3)	0	0	0
27	MF	(Brazil) Duda Sampaio	13 (3)	7	0	0	4 (7)	3	4 (1)	0	21 (11)	10	1	0
28	MF	(Brazil) Ju Ferreira	7 (9)	0	2	0	6 (6)	1	0 (3)	0	15 (18)	1	2	0
30	FW	(Brazil) Jaqueline	13 (3)	4	2 (1)	0	4 (4)	5	4 (1)	1	23 (9)	10	5	0
34	DF	(Brazil) Gabi Medeiros	0	0	0	0	0 (2)	0	0	0	0 (2)	0	0	0
36	DF	(Brazil) Lívia	0	0	0	0	0 (3)	0	0	0	0 (3)	0	0	0
37	DF	(Brazil) Tamires	15 (1)	4	2 (1)	3	8	1	5	0	31 (2)	8	5	0
40	FW	(Brazil) Jhonson	0	0	0	0	0 (1)	1	0	0	0 (1)	1	0	0
55	MF	(Brazil) Gabi Morais	0 (2)	0	0 (1)	0	1 (3)	0	0	0	1 (6)	0	2	0
70	FW	(Brazil) Ellen	0	0	0	0	0	0	0	0	0	0	0	0
71	DF	(Brazil) Yasmim	16 (1)	3	2 (1)	0	7 (4)	2	5 (1)	0	30 (7)	5	5	0
74	DF	(Brazil) Andressa	5	0	2 (1)	0	4 (3)	3	2 (2)	1	13 (6)	4	2	0
77	FW	(Brazil) Carol Nogueira	4 (5)	1	0 (1)	0	5 (5)	5	0	0	9 (11)	6	2	0
80	GK	(Brazil) Mary Camilo	1	0	0	0	2	0	0	0	3	0	0	0
99	DF	(Brazil) Érika	0	0	0	0	0	0	0	0	0	0	0	0
Players transferred out during the season
11	MF	(Colombia) Liana Salazar	1	0	1 (1)	0	0	0	0	0	2 (1)	0	0	0
23	GK	(Brazil) Paty	1 (1)	0	0	0	1	0	0	0	2 (1)	0	0	0

== Overview ==
Competition	First match	Last match	Starting round	Final position	Record							
Competition	First match	Last match	Starting round	Final position	Pld	W	D	L	GF	GA	GD	Win %
Série A1	26 February 2023	10 September 2023	Matchday 1	Winners	21	17	2	2	66	12	+54	80.95
Supercopa do Brasil	5 February 2023	12 February 2023	Quarter-finals	Winners	3	3	0	0	7	2	+5	100.00
Campeonato Paulista	3 May 2023	26 November 2023	First stage	Winners	15	13	1	1	66	8	+58	86.67
Copa Libertadores	6 October 2023	21 October 2023	Group stage	Winners	6	5	1	0	18	1	+17	83.33
Total					45	38	4	3	157	23	+134	84.44

Source: Competitions

== Supercopa do Brasil ==
5 February 2023 Quarter-finals	Corinthians	1–0	Atlético Mineiro	Diadema
10:30 UTC−3	Victória 57'	Report		Stadium: Estádio Distrital do Inamar (Note: Corinthians played their home match at Estádio Distrital do Inamar, Diadema instead of their regular stadium Parque São Jorge, São Paulo due to the maintenance of the stadium's pitch. Their other regular stadium Neo Química Arena also had its pitch recently maintained.); Attendance: 5,025; Referee: Rejane Caetano da Silva

9 February 2023 Semi-finals	Corinthians	2–1	Internacional	São Paulo
15:30 UTC−3	Diany 59'; Tamires 70' (pen.)	Report	Priscila 85'	Stadium: Neo Química Arena; Attendance: 4,777; Referee: Deborah Cecilia Cruz Correia

12 February 2023 Finals	Corinthians	4–1	Flamengo/Marinha	São Paulo
10:15 UTC−3	Tamires 1', 57'; Millene 36' (pen.), 45+4'	Report	Daiane 68'	Stadium: Neo Química Arena; Attendance: 25,779; Referee: Thayslane de Melo Costa

== Campeonato Brasileiro ==
Pos	Team	Pld	W	D	L	GF	GA	GD	Pts	Qualification or relegation
1	Corinthians	15	12	1	2	53	8	+45	37	Advance to Quarter-finals
2	Palmeiras	15	11	2	2	48	14	+34	35	Advance to Quarter-finals
3	Ferroviária	15	11	1	3	38	16	+22	34	Advance to Quarter-finals
4	Santos	15	10	2	3	32	10	+22	32	Advance to Quarter-finals
5	Flamengo/Marinha	15	10	1	4	23	14	+9	31	Advance to Quarter-finals

Source: CBF

=== Results ===
25 February 2023 1	Corinthians	14–0	Ceará	Mogi das Cruzes
11:00 UTC−3	Jaqueline 10' (pen.), 46'; Diany 24', 35', 38'; Jheniffer 31', 44'; Gabi Portilho 34', 81'; Luana 36'; Victória 51'; Fernanda 72', 86'; Millene 75'	Report		Stadium: Estádio Municipal Francisco Ribeiro Nogueira (Note: Corinthians played these home matches at Estádio Municipal Francisco Ribeiro Nogueira, Mogi das Cruzes instead of their regular stadium Parque São Jorge, São Paulo due to the stadium's pitch maintenance.); Attendance: 6,725; Referee: Fabiano Monteiro dos Santos

4 March 2023 2	Real Ariquemes	0–6	Corinthians	Ariquemes
15:30 UTC−4		Report	Carol Nogueira 49'; Jaqueline 66'; Grazi 67'; Jheniffer 70'; Millene 82', 90+5'	Stadium: Estádio Gentil Valério; Attendance: 668; Referee: Jonathan Antero Silva

13 March 2023 3	Corinthians	4–0	Grêmio	São Paulo
20:00 UTC−3	Yasmim 11'; Victória 37'; Mariza 89'; Duda Sampaio 90+3'	Report		Stadium: Estádio do Canindé (Note: Corinthians played their home match at Estádio do Canindé, São Paulo instead of their regular stadium Parque São Jorge, São Paulo due to the stadium's pitch maintenance.); Attendance: 718; Referee: Adeli Mara Monteiro

20 March 2023 4	Ferroviária	1–4	Corinthians	Araraquara
20:00 UTC−3	Aline Gomes 66'	Report	Victória 9' (pen.), 69'; Jaqueline 24'; Jheniffer 90+7'	Stadium: Arena Fonte Luminosa; Attendance: Undisclosed; Referee: Marianna Nanni Batalha

26 March 2023 5	Corinthians	1–0	Athletico Paranaense	Mogi das Cruzes
18:00 UTC−3	Luana 59'	Report		Stadium: Estádio Municipal Francisco Ribeiro Nogueira; Attendance: 922; Referee: Fernanda dos Santos Ignacio de Souza
Note: The match was originally scheduled for 25 March, but it was postponed due to table adjustments.

2 April 2023 6	Real Brasília	0–0	Corinthians	Brasília
15:00 UTC−3		Report		Stadium: Estádio Ciro Machado do Espírito Santo (Note: Real Brasília was originally expected to play their home match at Estádio Boca do Jacaré, Taguatinga but opted to play at their regular stadium Estádio Ciro Machado do Espírito Santo, Brasília instead.); Attendance: Undisclosed; Referee: Rafael Martins Diniz

17 April 2023 7	Corinthians	3–2	Palmeiras	São Paulo
18:30 UTC−3	Victória 6'; Tamires 49'; Tarciane 86'	Report	Benítez 30'; Camilinha 38'	Stadium: Parque São Jorge; Attendance: 1,933; Referee: Ilbert Estevam da Silva

24 April 2023 8	Internacional	2–0	Corinthians	São Leopoldo
17:30 UTC−3	Aquino 14'; Priscilla 27' (pen.)	Report		Stadium: Monumental do Cristo Rei (Note: Internacional played their home match at Monumental do Cristo Rei, São Leopoldo instead of their regular stadium Estádio Beira-Rio, Porto Alegre.); Attendance: Undisclosed; Referee: Lucas Guimarães Rechatiko Horn

30 April 2023 9	Corinthians	7–1	Cruzeiro	São Paulo
11:00 UTC−3	Yasmim 1'; Gabi Zanotti 11', 14', 30', 39'; Jheniffer 17'; Duda Sampaio 83'	Report	Vanessinha 67'	Stadium: Parque São Jorge; Attendance: 1,787; Referee: Marianna Nanni Batalha

7 May 2023 10	São Paulo	0–3	Corinthians	Cotia
11:00 UTC−3		Report	Tarciane 7'; Yasmim 30'; Luana 45+2'	Stadium: Estádio Marcelo Portugal Gouvêa; Attendance: Undisclosed; Referee: Fernanda dos Santos Ignacio de Souza

14 May 2023 11	Corinthians	1–0	Santos	São Paulo
11:00 UTC−3	Jheniffer 46'	Report		Stadium: Parque São Jorge; Attendance: 1,097; Referee: Fernanda dos Santos Ignacio de Souza

20 May 2023 12	Avaí/Kindermann	1–0	Corinthians	Caçador
15:00 UTC−3	Raquelzinha 90' (pen.)	Report		Stadium: Estádio Carlos Alberto da Costa Neves; Attendance: Undisclosed; Referee: Edson da Silva

28 May 2023 13	Corinthians	1–0	Atlético Mineiro	São Bernardo do Campo
11:00 UTC−3	Duda Sampaio 65'	Report		Stadium: Estádio 1º de Maio (Note: Corinthians played their home match at Estádio 1º de Maio, São Bernardo do Campo instead of their regular stadium Parque São Jorge, São Paulo due to the stadium's pitch maintenance.); Attendance: Undisclosed; Referee: Marianna Nanni Batalha
Note: The match was originally scheduled for 27 May, but it was postponed due to table adjustments.

5 June 2023 14	Corinthians	4–0	Flamengo/Marinha	São Paulo
20:00 UTC−3	Gabi Portilho 19'; Duda Sampaio 34'; Isabela 83', 89'	Report		Stadium: Parque São Jorge; Attendance: 1,140; Referee: Edina Alves Batista

12 June 2023 15	Bahia	1–5	Corinthians	Salvador
15:00 UTC−3	Acuña 29'	Report	Duda Sampaio 11'; Campiolo 16'; Tamires 20'; Jheniffer 45+3'; Victória 50'	Stadium: Estádio de Pituaçu; Attendance: Undisclosed; Referee: Wagner Francisco Silva Souza

=== Knockout stages ===
19 June 2023 Quarter-finals	Cruzeiro	1–2	Corinthians	Muriaé
20:00 UTC−3	Marília 45'	Report	Gabi Zanotti 31'; Victória 90+5' (pen.)	Stadium: Estádio Soares de Azevedo (Note: Cruzeiro played their home match at Estádio Soares de Azevedo, Muriaé instead of their regular stadium SESC Alterosas, Belo Horizonte.); Attendance: Undisclosed; Referee: Thayslane de Melo Costa

26 June 2023 Quarter-finals	Corinthians	4–2 (6–3 agg.)	Cruzeiro	São Paulo
18:30 UTC−3	Jheniffer 12'; Victória 23'; Duda Sampaio 49'; Tamires 63'	Report	Isa Fernandes 32'; Byanca Brasil 58'	Stadium: Parque São Jorge; Attendance: 2,815; Referee: Charly Wendy Straub Deretti

27 August 2023 Semi-finals	Santos	0–3	Corinthians	Santos
10:30 UTC−3		Report	Jheniffer 18', 37'; Victória 23'	Stadium: Vila Belmiro; Attendance: 4,471; Referee: Deborah Cecilia Cruz Correia

2 September 2023 Semi-finals	Corinthians	2–0 (5–0 agg.)	Santos	São Paulo
16:30 UTC−3	Duda Sampaio 64' (pen.); Fernanda 89'	Report		Stadium: Parque São Jorge; Attendance: 6,723; Referee: Charly Wendy Straub Deretti
Note: The match was originally scheduled for 3 September, but it was anticipated due to broadcast adjustments.

7 September 2023 Finals	Ferroviária	0–0	Corinthians	Araraquara
16:20 UTC−3		Report		Stadium: Arena Fonte Luminosa; Attendance: 9,899; Referee: Thayslane de Melo Costa

10 September 2023 Finals	Corinthians	2–1 (2–1 agg.)	Ferroviária	São Paulo
16:00 UTC−3	Jheniffer 42'; Tamires 58'	Report	Mylena Carioca 10'	Stadium: Neo Química Arena; Attendance: 42,556; Referee: Edina Alves Batista
Note: The attendance was a South American record for a women's club match.

== Campeonato Paulista ==
=== First stage ===
3 May 2023 1	Corinthians	2–1	São Paulo	São Paulo
19:00 UTC−3	Mimi 11' (o.g.); Jheniffer 74'	Report	Ariel 48'	Stadium: Parque São Jorge; Attendance: 986; Referee: João Vitor Gobi

10 May 2023 2	Ferroviária	1–2	Corinthians	Araraquara
15:30 UTC−3	Luana Sartório 26' (pen.)	Report	Jaqueline 45+3'	Stadium: Arena Fonte Luminosa; Attendance: Undisclosed; Referee: Lucas Canetto Bellote

17 May 2023 3	Palmeiras	1–1	Corinthians	Jundiaí
17:00 UTC−3	Bia Zaneratto 45' (pen.)	Report	Duda Sampaio 3'	Stadium: Estádio Jayme Cintra (Note: Palmeiras played their home match at Estádio Jayme Cintra, Jundiaí instead of their regular stadium Allianz Parque, São Paulo.); Attendance: 748; Referee: Guilherme Nunes de Santana

25 May 2023 4	Corinthians	12–0	SKA Brasil	Barueri
19:00 UTC−3	Jaqueline 8', 41', 83'; Victória 14', 26', 45+2'; Millene 18', 45', 51'; Grazi 29', 59'; Andressa 77'	Report		Stadium: Arena Barueri (Note: Corinthians played their home match at Arena Barueri, Barueri instead of their regular stadium Parque São Jorge, São Paulo due to the stadium's pitch maintenance.); Attendance: Undisclosed; Referee: Matheus Delgado Candançan

1 June 2023 5	Santos	0–1	Corinthians	Santos
21:30 UTC−3		Report	Gabi Portilho 40'	Stadium: Vila Belmiro; Attendance: 1,624; Referee: Thiago Luis Scarascati

8 June 2023 6	Corinthians	11–0	Realidade Jovem	São Paulo
21:00 UTC−3	Carol Nogueira 7', 47'; Tarciane 14'; Grazi 20', 28', 37'; Carol Tavares 27'; Millene 46'; Paulinha 67'; Miriã 70'; Jhonson 90+1' (pen.)	Report		Stadium: Parque São Jorge; Attendance: 643; Referee: Lucas Canetto Bellote

22 June 2023 7	Corinthians	4–1	Red Bull Bragantino	São Paulo
16:00 UTC−3	Victória 6'; Jheniffer 67'; Fernanda 69'; Miriã 83'	Report	Luana 90+4'	Stadium: Parque São Jorge; Attendance: 373; Referee: Fernanda dos Santos Ignacio de Souza

29 June 2023 8	São José	1–5	Corinthians	Osasco
17:00 UTC−3	Bruna Pelé 54'	Report	Ju Ferreira 6'; Fernanda 13', 18'; Grazi 23'; Carol Nogueira 47'	Stadium: Estádio Municipal Prefeito José Liberatti (Note: São José played their home match at Estádio Municipal Prefeito José Liberatti, Osasco instead of their regular stadium Estádio Martins Pereira, São José dos Campos.); Attendance: Undisclosed; Referee: Marianna Nanni Batalha

21 August 2023 9	Corinthians	5–0	Pinda	São Paulo
19:30 UTC−3	Yasmim 8'; Tamires 14'; Miriã 82'; Victória 85'; Duda Sampaio 89'	Report		Stadium: Parque São Jorge; Attendance: 526; Referee: Murilo Tarrega Victor

30 August 2023 10	Taubaté	0–3	Corinthians	Taubaté
15:00 UTC−3		Report	Carol Nogueira 12'; Millene 68'; Andressa 90+4'	Stadium: Estádio Joaquim de Morais Filho; Attendance: Undisclosed; Referee: Ronald Horns Araujo

14 September 2023 11	Corinthians	6–0	São Bernardo	São Paulo
21:00 UTC−3	Mariza 6'; Victória 23', 90+2'; Grazi 31'; Andressa 77'; Carol Nogueira 78'	Report		Stadium: Parque São Jorge; Attendance: 218; Referee: Gabriel Henrique Meira Bispo
Note: The match was originally scheduled for 6 September, but it was postponed due Corinthians' participation in the Campeonato Brasileiro Finals.

=== Knockout stage ===
4 November 2023 Semi-finals	Palmeiras	0–1	Corinthians	Jundiaí
11:00 UTC−3		Report	Mariza 45+2'	Stadium: Estádio Jayme Cintra (Note: Palmeiras played their home match at Estádio Jayme Cintra, Jundiaí instead of their regular stadium Allianz Parque, São Paulo.); Attendance: 1200; Referee: Edina Alves Batista

12 November 2023 Semi-finals	Corinthians	8–0 (9–0 agg.)	Palmeiras	São Paulo
11:00 UTC−3	Duda Sampaio 3'; Luana 16'; Gabi Portilho 44'; Victória 50'; Millene 52'; Mariza 64'; Jheniffer 69'; Miriã 81'	Report		Stadium: Neo Química Arena; Attendance: 24,215; Referee: João Vitor Gobi

19 November 2023 Finals	São Paulo	2–1	Corinthians	Santos
16:00 UTC−3	Aline Milene 41'; Ariel 77' (pen.)	Report	Victória 32'	Stadium: Vila Belmiro (Note: São Paulo played their home match at Vila Belmiro, Santos instead of their regular stadiums Estádio Marcelo Portugal Gouvêa, Cotia or Estádio do Morumbi, São Paulo.); Attendance: 2,064; Referee: Marianna Nanni Batalha

26 November 2023 Finals	Corinthians	4–1 (5–3 agg.)	São Paulo	São Paulo
10:30 UTC−3	Jaqueline 39'; Tarciane 54'; Victória 64'; Jheniffer 75'	Report	Dudinha 63'	Stadium: Neo Química Arena; Attendance: 40,235; Referee: Edina Alves Batista

== Copa Libertadores ==
=== Group stage ===
Pos	Team	Pld	W	D	L	GF	GA	GD	Pts	Qualification
1	(Brazil) Corinthians (A)	3	3	0	0	12	0	+12	9	Quarter-finals
2	(Chile) Colo-Colo (A)	3	2	0	1	9	3	+6	6	Quarter-finals
3	(Paraguay) Libertad/Limpeño (E)	3	1	0	2	3	10	−7	3	
4	(Bolivia) Always Ready (E)	3	0	0	3	3	14	−11	0	

Updated to match(es) played on 9 October 2023. Source: CONMEBOL
(A) Advance to a further round; (E) Eliminated

6 October 2023 1	Corinthians (Brazil)	1–0	(Chile) Colo-Colo	Bogotá, Colombia
17:30 UTC−5	Millene 74' (pen.)	Report		Stadium: Estadio Metropolitano de Techo; Attendance: Undisclosed; Referee: Anahí Fernández (Uruguay)

9 October 2023 2	Corinthians (Brazil)	6–0	(Bolivia) Always Ready	Bogotá, Colombia
17:30 UTC−5	Fernanda 18'; Millene 25', 27', 85'; Jaqueline 69' (pen.); Tamires 87' (pen.)	Report		Stadium: Estadio Metropolitano de Techo; Attendance: Undisclosed; Referee: Susana Corella (Ecuador)

12 October 2023 3	Libertad/Limpeño (Paraguay)	0–5	(Brazil) Corinthians	Cali, Colombia
15:00 UTC−5		Report	Victória 52'; Gabi Zanotti 55'; Andressa 60'; Jheniffer 86' (pen.); Paulinha 90'	Stadium: Estadio Pascual Guerrero; Attendance: Undisclosed; Referee: Milagros Arruela (Peru)

=== Knockout stages ===
15 October 2023 Quarter-final	Corinthians (Brazil)	4–0	(Colombia) América	Cali, Colombia
15:30 UTC−5	Zamorano 10' (o.g.); Millene 74' (pen.); Victória 79'; Fernanda 90+1'	Report		Stadium: Estadio Pascual Guerrero; Attendance: Undisclosed; Referee: Zulma Quiñónez (Paraguay)

18 October 2023 Semi-final	Corinthians (Brazil)	1–1 (4–3 p)	(Brazil) Internacional	Cali, Colombia
19:30 UTC−5	Victória 79'	Report	Priscila 31'	Stadium: Estadio Pascual Guerrero; Attendance: Undisclosed; Referee: Laura Fortunato (Argentina)
	Penalties
	Victória (penalty missed); Tarciane (penalty scored); Luana (penalty scored); Mariza (penalty scored); Fernanda (penalty scored)		(penalty scored) Djeni; (penalty scored) Bruna Benites; (penalty scored) Roberta; (penalty missed) Zóio; (penalty missed) Isa Haas

21 October 2023 Final	Palmeiras (Brazil)	0–1	(Brazil) Corinthians	Cali, Colombia
18:30 UTC−5		Report	Millene 30'	Stadium: Estadio Pascual Guerrero; Attendance: Undisclosed; Referee: Zulma Quiñónez (Paraguay)

== See also ==
- List of Sport Club Corinthians Paulista (women) seasons
