= 2023 Supercopa do Brasil de Futebol Feminino =

2023 Supercopa Feminina
2023 Supercopa do Brasil de Futebol Feminino

Tournament details
- Dates: 4–12 February
- Teams: 8

Final positions
- Champions: Corinthians (2nd title)
- Runners-up: Flamengo/Marinha

Tournament statistics
- Matches played: 7
- Goals scored: 33 (4.71 per match)
- Top goal scorer(s): Duda; Giovanna Crivelari; Tamires (3 goals each)
- All statistics correct as of 12 February 2023.

The 2023 Supercopa do Brasil de Futebol Feminino (officially the Supercopa Feminina Betano 2023 for sponsorship reasons) was the second edition of the Supercopa do Brasil de Futebol Feminino football competition. It was held between 4 and 12 February 2023.

Corinthians defeated Flamengo/Marinha 4–1 in the final to win their 2nd title.

== Format ==
The teams played a single-elimination tournament. All stages were played on a single-leg basis, with the highest-ranked-federation team in the 2023 Women's State Ranking hosting the leg. If the teams belonged to the same federation the highest-ranked team in the 2023 Women's Club Ranking would host the leg. If tied, the penalty shoot-out would be used to determine the winners.

== Qualified teams ==
The competition was contested by 8 teams. The teams were chosen between the top twelve teams of the 2022 Campeonato Brasileiro de Futebol Feminino Série A1 and the top four teams of the 2022 Campeonato Brasileiro de Futebol Feminino Série A2 choosing only one team for state. If necessary, a state would gain a second berth according to its 2023 Women's State CBF Ranking position.

Teams in bold qualified for the competition.

Position (tournament)	Team	State	Status
Champions (Série A1)	**Corinthians**	São Paulo	Qualified
Runners-up (Série A1)	**Internacional**	Rio Grande do Sul	Qualified
3rd place (Série A1)	Palmeiras	São Paulo	Not eligible
4th place (Série A1)	São Paulo	São Paulo	Not eligible
5th place (Série A1)	**Real Brasília**	Distrito Federal	Qualified
6th place (Série A1)	**Flamengo/Marinha**	Rio de Janeiro	Qualified
7th place (Série A1)	Ferroviária	São Paulo	Not eligible
8th place (Série A1)	Grêmio	Rio Grande do Sul	Not eligible
9th place (Série A1)	Santos	São Paulo	Not eligible
10th place (Série A1)	**Avaí**	Santa Catarina	Qualified
11th place (Série A1)	**Atlético Mineiro**	Minas Gerais	Qualified
12th place (Série A1)	Cruzeiro	Minas Gerais	Not eligible
Champions (Série A2)	**Ceará**	Ceará	Qualified
Runners-up (Série A2)	**Athletico Paranaense**	Paraná	Qualified
3rd place (Série A2)	Real Ariquemes	Rondônia	—
4th place (Série A2)	Bahia	Bahia	—

== Draw ==
The draw was held on 17 January 2023, 15:30 at CBF headquarters in Rio de Janeiro. The 8 qualified teams were drawn in a single group (2023 Women's Club Ranking shown in parentheses).

Group
- (São Paulo (state)) Corinthians (1)
- (Rio Grande do Sul) Internacional (3)
- (Santa Catarina (state)) Avaí (4)
- (Rio de Janeiro (state)) Flamengo/Marinha (5)
- (Federal District (Brazil)) Real Brasília (13)
- (Minas Gerais) Atlético Mineiro (16)
- Ceará (18)
- (Paraná (state)) Athletico Paranaense (28)

To determine the home teams, the 2023 Women's State Ranking of the participants is:

2023 Women's State Ranking
Rank	State
1	São Paulo
2	Rio de Janeiro
3	Rio Grande do Sul
4	Distrito Federal
5	Minas Gerais
6	Santa Catarina
9	Ceará
10	Paraná

Source:CBF

== Bracket ==
Quarter-finals
(São Paulo (state)) Corinthians	1
(Minas Gerais) Atlético Mineiro	0
(Rio Grande do Sul) Internacional	5
(Paraná (state)) Athletico Paranaense	1
(Rio de Janeiro (state)) Flamengo/Marinha	10
Ceará	0
(Federal District (Brazil)) Real Brasília	2
(Santa Catarina (state)) Avaí	1

Semi-finals
(São Paulo (state)) Corinthians	2
(Rio Grande do Sul) Internacional	1
(Rio de Janeiro (state)) Flamengo/Marinha	3
(Federal District (Brazil)) Real Brasília	2

Final
(São Paulo (state)) Corinthians	4
(Rio de Janeiro (state)) Flamengo/Marinha	1

== Quarter-finals ==
Team 1	Score	Team 2
Internacional (Rio Grande do Sul)	5–1	(Paraná (state)) Athletico Paranaense
Corinthians (São Paulo (state))	1–0	(Minas Gerais) Atlético Mineiro
Real Brasília (Federal District (Brazil))	2–1	(Santa Catarina (state)) Avaí
Flamengo/Marinha (Rio de Janeiro (state))	10–0	Ceará

=== Group A ===
4 February 2023
18:45

Internacional (Rio Grande do Sul)	5–1	(Paraná (state)) Athletico Paranaense
Roberta Schroeder 4'; Aquino 25', 47'; Bruna Benites 37'; Djeni 56' (pen.)	Report	Verônica Marques 3'

Estádio Beira-Rio, Porto Alegre
Referee: Marianna Nanni Batalha (São Paulo)

=== Group B ===
5 February 2023
10:30

Corinthians (São Paulo (state))	1–0	(Minas Gerais) Atlético Mineiro
Victória 56'	Report

Estádio Distrital do Inamar, Diadema
Attendance: 5,025
Referee: Rejane Caetano da Silva (Rio de Janeiro)

=== Group C ===
4 February 2023
21:00

Real Brasília (Federal District (Brazil))	2–1	(Santa Catarina (state)) Avaí
Carol Gomes 53'; Karla Alves 85' (pen.)	Report	Rafa Marques 17'

Serejão, Taguatinga
Referee: Francielly Fernanda Lima de Castro (Minas Gerais)

=== Group D ===
5 February 2023
10:30

Flamengo/Marinha (Rio de Janeiro (state))	10–0	Ceará
Jaimes 2'; Giovanna Crivelari 8', 66', 83'; Maria Alves 20'; Duda 29', 39'; Thaisa 74'; Gica 88' (pen.); Jucinara 90+2'	Report

Estádio Luso Brasileiro, Rio de Janeiro
Referee: Charly Wendy Straub Deretti (Santa Catarina)

== Semi-finals ==
Team 1	Score	Team 2
Corinthians (São Paulo (state))	2–1	(Rio Grande do Sul) Internacional
Flamengo/Marinha (Rio de Janeiro (state))	3–2	(Federal District (Brazil)) Real Brasília

=== Group E ===
9 February 2023
15:30

Corinthians (São Paulo (state))	2–1	(Rio Grande do Sul) Internacional
Diany 58'; Tamires 69' (pen.)	Report	Priscila 84'

Neo Química Arena, São Paulo
Attendance: 4,777
Referee: Deborah Cecilia Cruz Correia (Pernambuco)

=== Group F ===
8 February 2023
21:30

Flamengo/Marinha (Rio de Janeiro (state))	3–2	(Federal District (Brazil)) Real Brasília
Duda 42'; Rafa Soares 46' (o.g.); Jaimes 56'	Report	Karla Alves 8'; Gaby Soares 60'

Estádio Luso Brasileiro, Rio de Janeiro
Referee: Andreza Helena de Siqueira (Minas Gerais)

== Final ==
Team 1	Score	Team 2
Corinthians (São Paulo (state))	4–1	(Rio de Janeiro (state)) Flamengo/Marinha

=== Group G ===
12 February 2023
10:15

Corinthians (São Paulo (state))	4–1	(Rio de Janeiro (state)) Flamengo/Marinha
Tamires 1', 57'; Millene 36' (pen.), 45+4'	Report	Daiane 68'

Neo Química Arena, São Paulo
Attendance: 25,779
Referee: Thayslane de Melo Costa (Sergipe)

Corinthians	Flamengo/Marinha

GK	12	(Brazil) Letícia
RB	6	(Brazil) Isabela		(substituted off) 82'
CB	74	(Brazil) Andressa
CB	3	(Brazil) Tarciane
LB	71	(Brazil) Yasmim		(substituted off) 74'
DM	28	(Brazil) Ju Ferreira
CM	8	(Brazil) Diany		(substituted off) 65'
CM	17	(Brazil) Victória		(substituted off) 65'
RW	18	(Brazil) Gabi Portilho
CF	14	(Brazil) Millene	(yellow card) 37'	(substituted off) 74'
LW	37	(Brazil) Tamires (c)
Substitutes:
GK	1	(Brazil) Tainá
DF	2	(Brazil) Katiuscia		(substituted on) 82'
DF	13	(Brazil) Carol Tavares
MF	5	(Brazil) Luana
MF	7	(Brazil) Grazi
MF	11	(Colombia) Liana Salazar		(substituted on) 65'
MF	20	(Brazil) Mariza
MF	55	(Brazil) Gabi Morais		(substituted on) 65'
FW	9	(Brazil) Jheniffer		(substituted on) 74'
FW	22	(Brazil) Fernanda
FW	30	(Brazil) Jaqueline	(yellow card) 79'	(substituted on) 74'
FW	77	(Brazil) Carol Nogueira
Coach:
(Brazil) Arthur Elias

GK	1	(Brazil) Bárbara	(yellow card) 30'
RB	2	(Brazil) Monalisa		(substituted off) 46'
CB	3	(Brazil) Daiane (c)
CB	27	(Brazil) Thaís Regina	(yellow card) 45+2'
LB	81	(Brazil) Jucinara
CM	5	(Brazil) Kaylane		(substituted off) 44'
CM	17	(Brazil) Thaisa		(substituted off) 46'
AM	10	(Brazil) Duda
RF	9	(Brazil) Maria Alves	(yellow card) 18'	(substituted off) 60'
CF	99	(Argentina) Sole Jaimes	(yellow card) 41'
LF	19	(Brazil) Giovanna Crivelari
Substitutes:
GK	23	(Brazil) Karol Alves
DF	6	(Brazil) Gisseli
DF	22	(Argentina) Agustina Barroso		(substituted on) 46'
DF	94	(Brazil) Rayanne Machado		(substituted on) 46'
MF	8	(Brazil) Cris
MF	11	(Brazil) Leidiane
MF	18	(Brazil) Gaby Louvain
MF	28	(Brazil) Kaylaine Júnior		(substituted on) 44'
MF	32	(Brazil) Duda Rodrigues
MF	33	(Brazil) Tuca
FW	7	(Brazil) Darlene
FW	21	(Brazil) Gica		(substituted on) 60'
Coach:
(Portugal) Luís Andrade

Assistant referees:
Leila Naiara Moreira da Cruz (Distrito Federal)
Anne Kesy Gomes de Sá (Amazonas)
Fourth official:
Fernanda dos Santos Ignácio de Souza (São Paulo)
Fifth official:
Marcela de Almeida Silva (São Paulo)
Video assistant referee:
Pablo Ramon Gonçalves Pinheiro (Rio Grande do Norte)
Assistant video assistant referees:
Charly Wendy Straub Deretti (Santa Catarina)

Match rules

- 90 minutes.
- Penalty shoot-out if scores still level.
- Twelve named substitutes.
- Maximum of five substitutions.
