= Tainá (footballer) =

Brazilian footballer (born 1995)

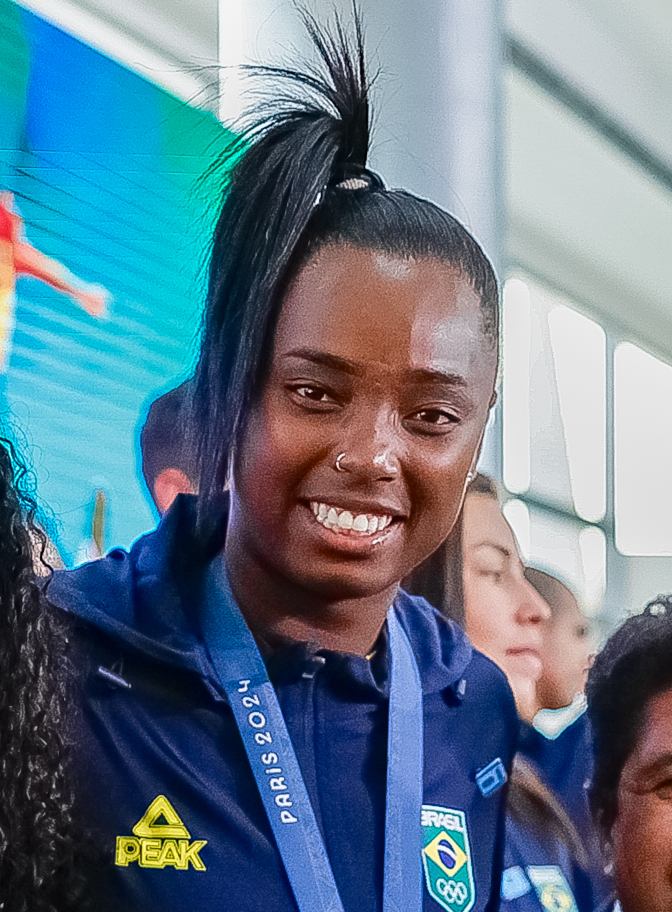
- Tainá in 2024

Personal information
- Full name: Tainá Suelen Borges de Oliveira
- Date of birth: 1 May 1995 (age 31)
- Place of birth: São Paulo, Brazil
- Height: 1.89 m (6 ft 2 in)
- Position: Goalkeeper

Team information
- Current team: Palmeiras
- Number: 1

Senior career*
Years	Team	Apps	(Gls)
2012–2015	Centro Olímpico	1	(0)
2015	Audax		
2016–2017	Audax/Corinthians	2	(0)
2018–2023	Corinthians	24	(0)
2024–	América Mineiro	6	(0)

International career^{‡}
2012	Brazil U17	1	(0)
2024–	Brazil	1	(0)
Medal record
Women's football
Representing Brazil
Olympic Games
Silver medal – second place	2024 Paris
- * Club domestic league appearances and goals as of 21:58, 4 April 2024 (UTC) ‡ National team caps and goals as of 21:58, 4 April 2024 (UTC)

Tainá Suelen Borges de Oliveira (born 1 May 1995), simply known as Tainá, is a Brazilian professional footballer who plays as a goalkeeper for Palmeiras.

== Club career ==
=== Centro Olímpico ===
Born in São Paulo, Tainá began her career with Centro Olímpico in 2012. She made her league debut against Duque de Caxias on 20 September 2015.

=== Audax / Corinthians ===
In 2015, she moved to Audax, and joined Corinthians in the following year, after a partnership between both clubs was made. Tainá made her league debut against Vasco da Gama on 17 February 2016.

=== Second spell at Corinthians ===
Tainá remained at Timão for the 2018 campaign, after their partnership with Audax ended, but was mainly a backup option to Letícia Izidoro during her entire spell. She made her league debut against São Francisco BA on 25 April 2018. In April 2021, Tainá suffered an anterior cruciate ligament injury, She left the club on 22 December 2023, after eight seasons.

=== América Mineiro ===
On 18 January 2024, Tainá was announced at América Mineiro. She made her league debut against SC Internacional on 16 March 2024.

== International career ==
Tainá made her under 17 debut against Germany U17s on 5 October 2012.

After representing Brazil at under-17 level in the 2012 FIFA U-17 Women's World Cup, Tainá received her first call up for the full side on 15 March 2024, being included in Arthur Elias' 23-woman squad for the 2024 SheBelieves Cup. She made her international debut against Canada on 6 April 2024.

On 2 July 2024, Tainá was called up to the Brazil squad for the 2024 Summer Olympics.

== Honours ==
Centro Olímpico

- Campeonato Brasileiro de Futebol Feminino Série A1: 2013

Audax/Corinthians

- Copa do Brasil de Futebol Feminino: 2016

Corinthians

- Campeonato Brasileiro de Futebol Feminino Série A1: 2018, 2020, 2021, 2022, 2023
- Copa Libertadores Femenina: 2019, 2021, 2023
- Campeonato Paulista de Futebol Feminino: 2019, 2020, 2021
- Supercopa do Brasil de Futebol Feminino: 2022, 2023
- Copa Paulista de Futebol Feminino: 2022

Palmeiras

- Campeonato Paulista de Futebol Feminino: 2025
- Copa do Brasil de Futebol Feminino: 2025
- Brasil Ladies Cup: 2025
- Supercopa do Brasil de Futebol Feminino: 2026

Brazil

- Summer Olympics silver medal: 2024
