= 2023 Copa Libertadores Femenina =

15th edition of the CONMEBOL Libertadores Femenina

Tournament details
- Host country: Colombia
- Cities: Bogotá and Cali
- Dates: 5–21 October 2023
- Teams: 16 (from 10 associations)
- Venues: 2 (in 2 host cities)

Final positions
- Champions: (Brazil) Corinthians (4th title)
- Runners-up: (Brazil) Palmeiras
- Third place: (Colombia) Atlético Nacional/Formas Íntimas
- Fourth place: (Brazil) Internacional

Tournament statistics
- Matches played: 32
- Goals scored: 132 (4.13 per match)
- Attendance: 25,300 (791 per match)
- Top scorer: Priscila (8 goals)

The 2023 Copa CONMEBOL Libertadores Femenina was the 15th edition of the CONMEBOL Libertadores Femenina (also referred to as the Copa Libertadores Femenina), South America's premier women's club football tournament organized by CONMEBOL. The tournament was held in Colombia from 5 to 21 October 2023.

Corinthians (Brazil) defeated the defending champions Palmeiras (Brazil) 1–0 in the final to win their fourth title.

== Format ==
For the group stage, the 16 teams were drawn into four groups. Teams in each group played one another in a round-robin basis, with the top two teams of each group advancing to the quarter-finals. Starting from the quarter-finals, the teams played a single-elimination tournament.

== Teams ==
The 16 teams were:

- the champions of all ten CONMEBOL associations
- the title holders
- an additional team from the host association
- four additional teams from associations with the best historical performance in the tournament (associations in **bold** receive two berths according to the points total until the 2022 edition).
  1. Brazil: 260 points
  2. Chile: 148 points
  3. Colombia: 145 points
  4. Paraguay: 115 points
  5. Argentina: 105 points
  6. Venezuela: 79 points
  7. Ecuador: 66 points
  8. Uruguay: 53 points
  9. Bolivia: 40 points
  10. Peru: 38 points

Association	Team	Qualifying method	Participation	Previous best result
Argentina	Boca Juniors	2022 Campeonato Femenino YPF champions	8th	Runners-up (2022)
Bolivia	Always Ready	2023 Copa Simón Bolívar Femenina champions	2nd	Group stage (2022)
Brazil	Palmeiras (Brazil 1)	2022 Copa Libertadores Femenina champions	2nd	**Champions** (2022)
Brazil	Corinthians (Brazil 2)	2022 Brasileirão Feminino Neonergia champions	6th (Note: Corinthians won the 2017 title as a partnership with Audax. They created their own team for the 2018 season.)	**Champions** (2017, 2019, 2021)
Brazil	Internacional (Brazil 3)	2022 Brasileirão Feminino Neonergia runners-up	1st	—
Chile	Colo-Colo (Chile 1)	2022 Campeonato Femenino Caja Los Andes champions	10th	**Champions** (2012)
Chile	Universidad de Chile (Chile 2)	2023 Copa Libertadores Femenina qualifying play-off winners (Note: The qualifying play-off was played on 30 July 2023 at Estadio Bicentenario de La Florida between Universidad de Chile (2022 Campeonato runners-up and 2023 Campeonato first stage winners) and Santiago Morning (2023 Campeonato first stage third place).)	4th	Fourth place (2020)
Colombia (hosts)	Santa Fe (Colombia 1)	2023 Liga Femenina BetPlay DIMAYOR champions	4th	Runners-up (2021)
Colombia (hosts)	América (Colombia 2)	2023 Liga Femenina BetPlay DIMAYOR runners-up	4th	Runners-up (2020)
Colombia (hosts)	Atlético Nacional/ Formas Íntimas (Colombia 3)	2023 Liga Femenina BetPlay DIMAYOR aggregate table best team not yet qualified (Host association additional entry)	9th (Note: Formas Íntimas were runners-up in 2013. In 2023 they started a partnership with Atlético Nacional (1st participation).)	Runners-up (2013)
Ecuador	Barcelona	2023 Superliga Femenina DoradoBet champions	1st	—
Paraguay	Olimpia (Paraguay 1)	2023 Torneo Apertura de Fútbol Femenino champions	2nd	Group stage (2022)
Paraguay	Libertad/Limpeño (Paraguay 2)	2023 Torneo Apertura de Fútbol Femenino runners-up	6th (Note: Sportivo Limpeño won the 2016 title. In 2018 they started a partnership with Libertad (4th participation).)	**Champions** (2016)
Peru	Universitario	2023 Liga Femenina Apuesta Total champions	5th	Group stage (2015, 2016, 2017, 2020)
Uruguay	Nacional	2022 Torneo Rexona de Fútbol Femenino champions	6th	Fourth place (2021)
Venezuela	Caracas	2023 Liga FUTVE Femenina champions	6th	Runners-up (2014)

== Venues ==
On 11 August 2023, the Colombian Football Federation announced that Bogotá and Cali had been selected as host cities by CONMEBOL. Matches were played at Estadio Metropolitano de Techo in Bogotá and Estadio Olímpico Pascual Guerrero in Cali, each hosting two groups.

Bogotá	2023 Copa Libertadores Femenina is located in Colombia	Cali
Estadio Metropolitano de Techo	2023 Copa Libertadores Femenina is located in Colombia	Estadio Pascual Guerrero
Capacity: 8,000	2023 Copa Libertadores Femenina is located in Colombia	Capacity: 35,405

The tournament registered a total attendance of 25,300 spectators, or the average of 790 per game, which was below expectations.

== Match officials ==
On 19 September 2023, CONMEBOL announced the referees and assistant referees appointed for the tournament.

Association	Referees	Assistant referees
Argentina	Laura Fortunato	Mariana de Almeida; Gisela Trucco
Bolivia	Adriana Farfán	Inés Choque; Elizabeth Blanco
Brazil	Edina Alves Batista	Neuza Back; Fabrini Bevilaqua
Chile	María Belén Carvajal	Marcia Castillo; Leslie Vásquez
Colombia	Jenny Arias	Mary Blanco; Mayra Sánchez
Ecuador	Susana Corella	Mónica Amboya; Viviana Segura
Paraguay	Zulma Quiñónez	Nancy Fernández; Nadia Weiler
Peru	Milagros Arruela	Vera Yupanqui; Gabriela Moreno
Uruguay	Anahí Fernández	Daiana Fernández; Belén Clavijo
Venezuela	Emikar Calderas	Migdalia Rodríguez; Thaity Dugarte

== Draw ==
The draw for the tournament was held on 15 September 2023, 12:00 PYT (UTC−4), at the CONMEBOL Convention Center in Luque, Paraguay. The 16 teams were drawn into four groups of four.

Two teams were directly assigned to the head of groups A and B.

- To Group A: as 2022 Copa Libertadores Femenina champions, Palmeiras (Brazil 1)
- To Group B: the champions of the host association, Santa Fe (Colombia 1)

The remaining teams (excluding the four teams from national associations with an extra berth) were seeded into three pots based on the final placement of their national association's club in the previous edition of the tournament, with the highest two (Brazil 2 and Argentina) placed in Pot 1, the next four (Colombia 2, Chile 1, Ecuador and Paraguay 1) placed in Pot 2 and the lowest four (Peru, Venezuela, Uruguay and Bolivia) in Pot 3. The four additional teams from associations with the best historical performance (Brazil 3, Chile 2, Colombia 3 and Paraguay 2) were seeded into Pot 4. From Pot 1, the first team drawn was placed into group C and the second team drawn placed into group D, both teams assigned to position 1 in their group. From each remaining pot, the first team drawn was placed into Group A, the second team drawn placed into Group B, the third team drawn placed into Group C and the final team drawn placed into Group D, with teams from Pot 2, 3 and 4 assigned to positions 2, 3 and 4 in their group. Teams from the same association could not be drawn into the same group.

Pot 1	Pot 2	Pot 3	Pot 4
(Argentina) Boca Juniors; (Brazil) Corinthians	(Colombia) América; (Chile) Colo-Colo; (Ecuador) Barcelona; (Paraguay) Olimpia	(Peru) Universitario; (Venezuela) Caracas; (Uruguay) Nacional; (Bolivia) Always Ready	(Brazil) Internacional; Universidad de Chile; (Colombia) Atlético Nacional/Formas Íntimas; (Paraguay) Libertad/Limpeño

The draw resulted in the following groups:

Group A
Pos	Team
A1	(Brazil) Palmeiras
A2	(Ecuador) Barcelona
A3	(Venezuela) Caracas
A4	(Colombia) Atlético Nacional/Formas Íntimas

Group B
Pos	Team
B1	(Colombia) Santa Fe
B2	(Paraguay) Olimpia
B3	(Peru) Universitario
B4	Universidad de Chile

Group C
Pos	Team
C1	(Brazil) Corinthians
C2	(Chile) Colo-Colo
C3	(Bolivia) Always Ready
C4	(Paraguay) Libertad/Limpeño

Group D
Pos	Team
D1	(Argentina) Boca Juniors
D2	(Colombia) América
D3	(Uruguay) Nacional
D4	(Brazil) Internacional

== Group stage ==
In the group stage, the teams were ranked according to points (3 points for a win, 1 point for a draw, 0 points for a loss). If tied on points, tiebreakers would be applied in the following order (Regulations Article 24).

1. Head-to-head result in games between tied teams;
  1. Points obtained in the matches played between the teams in question;
  2. Goal difference in the matches played between the teams in question;
  3. Number of goals scored in the matches played between the teams in question;
2. Goal difference in all group matches;
3. Goals scored in all group matches;
4. Number of red cards;
5. Number of yellow cards;
6. Drawing of lots.

The winners and runners-up of each group advanced to the quarter-finals.

All times are local, COT (UTC−5).

=== Group A ===
Pos	Team	Pld	W	D	L	GF	GA	GD	Pts	Qualification
1	(Brazil) Palmeiras	3	3	0	0	15	3	+12	9	Quarter-finals
2	(Colombia) Atlético Nacional/Formas Íntimas	3	2	0	1	9	6	+3	6	Quarter-finals
3	(Ecuador) Barcelona	3	1	0	2	5	10	−5	3	
4	(Venezuela) Caracas	3	0	0	3	2	12	−10	0	

Source: CONMEBOL
5 October 2023
15:00

Palmeiras (Brazil)	5–0	(Ecuador) Barcelona
Poliana 32'; Bia Zaneratto 51' (pen.); Amanda Gutierres 64'; Katrine 74'; Letícia Moreno 90+3'	Report

Estadio Pascual Guerrero, Cali
Referee: Zulma Quiñónez (Paraguay)
5 October 2023
17:30

Caracas (Venezuela)	0–3	(Colombia) Atlético Nacional/Formas Íntimas
	Report	González 38'; Montoya 42'; Rincón 79'

Estadio Pascual Guerrero, Cali
Referee: Adriana Farfán (Bolivia)

8 October 2023
15:00

Palmeiras (Brazil)	6–0	(Venezuela) Caracas
Poliana 10'; Laís Estevam 14', 26', 27'; Duda Santos 17'; Katrine 31'	Report

Estadio Pascual Guerrero, Cali
Referee: Milagros Arruela (Peru)
8 October 2023
17:30

Barcelona (Ecuador)	2–3	(Colombia) Atlético Nacional/Formas Íntimas
Gracia 33'; Cuadra 69'	Report	Valencia 51', 73'; González 76'

Estadio Pascual Guerrero, Cali
Referee: María Belén Carvajal (Chile)

11 October 2023
15:00

Atlético Nacional/Formas Íntimas (Colombia)	3–4	(Brazil) Palmeiras
S. Córdoba 2'; M. Restrepo 60'; Espinales 65'	Report	Bia Zaneratto 26', 56'; Benítez 80'; Flávia Mota 86'

Estadio Metropolitano de Techo, Bogotá
Referee: Laura Fortunato (Argentina)
11 October 2023
15:00

Barcelona (Ecuador)	3–2	(Venezuela) Caracas
Riera 3', 88' (pen.), 90+2'	Report	Colmenárez 47', 73'

Estadio Pascual Guerrero, Cali
Referee: Zulma Quiñónez (Paraguay)

=== Group B ===
Pos	Team	Pld	W	D	L	GF	GA	GD	Pts	Qualification
1	Universidad de Chile	3	2	1	0	4	2	+2	7	Quarter-finals
2	(Paraguay) Olimpia	3	2	0	1	6	4	+2	6	Quarter-finals
3	(Colombia) Santa Fe	3	1	1	1	6	3	+3	4	
4	(Peru) Universitario	3	0	0	3	1	8	−7	0	

Source: CONMEBOL
5 October 2023
15:00

Universitario (Peru)	0–1	Universidad de Chile
	Report	Vecca 59'

Estadio Metropolitano de Techo, Bogotá
Referee: Susana Corella (Ecuador)
5 October 2023
17:30

Santa Fe (Colombia)	1–2	(Paraguay) Olimpia
Celis 31'	Report	Garay López 41'; Peralta 75'

Estadio Metropolitano de Techo, Bogotá
Referee: Edina Alves Batista (Brazil)

8 October 2023
15:00

Olimpia (Paraguay)	1–2	Universidad de Chile
Genes 35'	Report	Sánchez 19'; Caniguán 59'

Estadio Metropolitano de Techo, Bogotá
Referee: Laura Fortunato (Argentina)
8 October 2023
17:30

Santa Fe (Colombia)	4–0	(Peru) Universitario
Celis 36', 49', 58' (pen.); Garavito 90'	Report

Estadio Metropolitano de Techo, Bogotá
Referee: Anahí Fernández (Uruguay)

11 October 2023
17:30

Universidad de Chile	1–1	(Colombia) Santa Fe
Fernández 89'	Report	Pinilla 35' (o.g.)

Estadio Metropolitano de Techo, Bogotá
Referee: Edina Alves Batista (Brazil)
11 October 2023
17:30

Olimpia (Paraguay)	3–1	(Peru) Universitario
González 4'; Balcázar 55' (o.g.); Garay López 76'	Report	Novoa 31'

Estadio Pascual Guerrero, Cali
Referee: Emikar Calderas (Venezuela)

=== Group C ===
Pos	Team	Pld	W	D	L	GF	GA	GD	Pts	Qualification
1	(Brazil) Corinthians	3	3	0	0	12	0	+12	9	Quarter-finals
2	(Chile) Colo-Colo	3	2	0	1	9	3	+6	6	Quarter-finals
3	(Paraguay) Libertad/Limpeño	3	1	0	2	3	10	−7	3	
4	(Bolivia) Always Ready	3	0	0	3	3	14	−11	0	

Source: CONMEBOL
6 October 2023
15:00

Always Ready (Bolivia)	1–3	(Paraguay) Libertad/Limpeño
Rojas 45+4'	Report	Zambrano 14'; Martínez 23'; Portillo 83'

Estadio Metropolitano de Techo, Bogotá
Referee: Jenny Arias (Colombia)
6 October 2023
17:30

Corinthians (Brazil)	1–0	(Chile) Colo-Colo
Millene 74' (pen.)	Report

Estadio Metropolitano de Techo, Bogotá
Referee: Anahí Fernández (Uruguay)

9 October 2023
15:00

Colo-Colo (Chile)	4–0	(Paraguay) Libertad/Limpeño
Jiménez 31'; Grez 41', 57'; Olave 52'	Report

Estadio Metropolitano de Techo, Bogotá
Referee: Edina Alves Batista (Brazil)
9 October 2023
17:30

Corinthians (Brazil)	6–0	(Bolivia) Always Ready
Fernandinha 18'; Millene 25', 27', 85'; Jaqueline 69' (pen.); Tamires 87' (pen.)	Report

Estadio Metropolitano de Techo, Bogotá
Referee: Susana Corella (Ecuador)

12 October 2023
15:00

Colo-Colo (Chile)	5–2	(Bolivia) Always Ready
Jiménez 22', 76'; Olave 28'; Urrutia 37'; Viso 80'	Report	Portales 2'; Rojas 40'

Estadio Metropolitano de Techo, Bogotá
Referee: Jenny Arias (Colombia)
12 October 2023
15:00

Libertad/Limpeño (Paraguay)	0–5	(Brazil) Corinthians
	Report	Victória 52'; Gabi Zanotti 55'; Andressa Pereira 60'; Jheniffer 86' (pen.); Paulinha 90'

Estadio Pascual Guerrero, Cali
Referee: Milagros Arruela (Peru)

=== Group D ===
Pos	Team	Pld	W	D	L	GF	GA	GD	Pts	Qualification
1	(Brazil) Internacional	3	3	0	0	12	2	+10	9	Quarter-finals
2	(Colombia) América	3	1	1	1	7	5	+2	4	Quarter-finals
3	(Argentina) Boca Juniors	3	1	1	1	6	7	−1	4	
4	(Uruguay) Nacional	3	0	0	3	1	12	−11	0	

Source: CONMEBOL
6 October 2023
15:00

Nacional (Uruguay)	0–3	(Brazil) Internacional
	Report	Priscila 45+2' (pen.); Letícia Monteiro 53'; Soll 83'

Estadio Pascual Guerrero, Cali
Referee: Emikar Calderas (Venezuela)
6 October 2023
17:30

Boca Juniors (Argentina)	1–1	(Colombia) América
Priori 45+3'	Report	Bahr 55'

Estadio Pascual Guerrero, Cali
Referee: María Belén Carvajal (Chile)

9 October 2023
15:00

Boca Juniors (Argentina)	5–1	(Uruguay) Nacional
Gómez Ares 12', 71'; Núñez 54' (pen.); Polich 86'; Troncoso 90+4'	Report	Fontán 89' (pen.)

Estadio Pascual Guerrero, Cali
Referee: Zulma Quiñónez (Paraguay)
9 October 2023
17:30

América (Colombia)	2–4	(Brazil) Internacional
Usme 49'; Natis 75'	Report	Aquino 17'; Letícia Monteiro 51'; Eskerdinha 76'; Soll 82'

Estadio Pascual Guerrero, Cali
Referee: Adriana Farfán (Bolivia)

12 October 2023
17:30

Internacional (Brazil)	5–0	(Argentina) Boca Juniors
Roberta Schroeder 5'; Priscila 21', 41' (pen.); Letícia Monteiro 25'; Soll 87'	Report

Estadio Metropolitano de Techo, Bogotá
Referee: Susana Corella (Ecuador)
12 October 2023
17:30

América (Colombia)	4–0	(Uruguay) Nacional
Usme 28', 45+5' (pen.); Muñoz 45'; Zamorano 62'	Report

Estadio Pascual Guerrero, Cali
Referee: María Belén Carvajal (Chile)

== Final stages ==
Starting from the quarter-finals, the teams played a single-elimination tournament. If tied after full time, extra time would not be played, and the penalty shoot-out would be used to determine the winners (Regulations Article 27).

=== Bracket ===
Quarter-finals
14 October – Bogotá
(Brazil) Palmeiras	6
(Paraguay) Olimpia	0
14 October – Bogotá
Universidad de Chile	1
(Colombia) Atlético Nacional/Formas Íntimas	2
15 October – Cali
(Brazil) Corinthians	4
(Colombia) América	0
15 October – Cali
(Brazil) Internacional	4
(Chile) Colo-Colo	2

Semi-finals
17 October – Bogotá
(Brazil) Palmeiras	3
(Colombia) Atlético Nacional/Formas Íntimas	1
18 October – Cali
(Brazil) Corinthians (p)	1 (4)
(Brazil) Internacional	1 (3)

Final
21 October – Cali
(Brazil) Palmeiras	0
(Brazil) Corinthians	1
Third place
21 October – Cali
(Colombia) Atlético Nacional/Formas Íntimas	3
(Brazil) Internacional	2

=== Quarter-finals ===
14 October 2023
15:30

Universidad de Chile	1–2	(Colombia) Atlético Nacional/Formas Íntimas
Sánchez 45'	Report	Rincón 2'; González 10'

Estadio Metropolitano de Techo, Bogotá
Referee: Susana Corella (Ecuador)

14 October 2023
18:30

Palmeiras (Brazil)	6–0	(Paraguay) Olimpia
Bia Zaneratto 10', 28' (pen.); Amanda Gutierres 19', 51'; Laís Estevam 48'; Sâmia Pryscila 77'	Report

Estadio Metropolitano de Techo, Bogotá
Referee: Anahí Fernández (Uruguay)

15 October 2023
15:30

Corinthians (Brazil)	4–0	(Colombia) América
Tarciane 10'; Millene 74' (pen.); Victória 79'; Fernandinha 90+1'	Report

Estadio Pascual Guerrero, Cali
Referee: Zulma Quiñónez (Paraguay)

15 October 2023
18:30

Internacional (Brazil)	4–2	(Chile) Colo-Colo
Priscila 17', 20', 73'; Isa Haas 56'	Report	Bogarín 29'; Viso 90+2'

Estadio Pascual Guerrero, Cali
Referee: Milagros Arruela (Peru)

=== Semi-finals ===
17 October 2023
19:30

Palmeiras (Brazil)	3–1	(Colombia) Atlético Nacional/Formas Íntimas
Bia Zaneratto 35' (pen.); Amanda Gutierres 40', 68'	Report	Montoya 77'

Estadio Metropolitano de Techo, Bogotá
Referee: Emikar Calderas (Venezuela)

18 October 2023
19:30

Corinthians (Brazil)	1–1	(Brazil) Internacional
Victória 79'	Report	Priscila 31'
Penalties
Victória (penalty missed); Tarciane (penalty scored); Luana (penalty scored); Mariza (penalty scored); Fernandinha (penalty scored)	4–3	(penalty scored) Djeni; (penalty scored) Bruna Benites; (penalty scored) Roberta Schroeder; (penalty missed) Zóio; (penalty missed) Isa Haas

Estadio Pascual Guerrero, Cali
Referee: Laura Fortunato (Argentina)

=== Third place match ===
21 October 2023
15:30

Atlético Nacional/Formas Íntimas (Colombia)	3–2	(Brazil) Internacional
González 45+1', 60'; M. Restrepo 90+2'	Report	Priscila 51'; Analuyza 90+5'

Estadio Pascual Guerrero, Cali
Referee: Anahí Fernández (Uruguay)

=== Final ===
Andressinha (Palmeiras) was ruled out of the final due to ACL injury of her right knee.

21 October 2023
18:30

Palmeiras (Brazil)	0–1	(Brazil) Corinthians
	Report	Millene 30'

Estadio Pascual Guerrero, Cali
Attendance: 3,580
Referee: Zulma Quiñónez (Paraguay)

Palmeiras	Corinthians

GK	1	(Brazil) Amanda
DF	2	(Brazil) Bruna Calderan
DF	3	(Brazil) Poliana		(substituted off) 88'
DF	23	(Brazil) Flávia Mota
DF	6	(Brazil) Katrine
MF	5	(Argentina) Lorena Benítez		(substituted off) 73'
MF	7	(Brazil) Duda Santos
MF	9	(Brazil) Camilinha	(yellow card) 17'	(substituted off) 34'
FW	10	(Brazil) Bia Zaneratto (c)
FW	8	(Brazil) Amanda Gutierres	(yellow card) 45+1'
FW	26	(Brazil) Laís Estevam
Substitutes:
GK	22	(Paraguay) Alicia Bobadilla
DF	4	(Brazil) Sorriso
DF	12	(Brazil) Juliete		(substituted on) 34'
MF	16	(Paraguay) Rosa Miño
MF	18	(Brazil) Sâmia Pryscila
FW	11	(Argentina) Yamila Rodríguez		(substituted on) 73'
FW	15	(Brazil) Bianca Gomes
FW	19	(Brazil) Letícia Moreno		(substituted on) 88'
Manager:
(Brazil) Ricardo Belli				(yellow card) 61'

GK	12	(Brazil) Lelê
DF	2	(Brazil) Katiuscia
DF	20	(Brazil) Mariza
DF	3	(Brazil) Tarciane	(yellow card) 24' (yellow-red card) 66'
DF	71	(Brazil) Yasmim	(yellow card) 50'
MF	5	(Brazil) Luana		(substituted off) 78'
MF	17	(Brazil) Victória		(substituted off) 65'
MF	10	(Brazil) Gabi Zanotti		(substituted off) 78'
FW	18	(Brazil) Gabi Portilho		(substituted off) 90+3'
FW	14	(Brazil) Millene		(substituted off) 78'
FW	37	(Brazil) Tamires (c)	(yellow card) 88'
Substitutes:
GK	24	(Brazil) Kemelli
DF	6	(Brazil) Belinha		(substituted on) 78'
DF	21	(Brazil) Paulinha
DF	74	(Brazil) Andressa Pereira		(substituted on) 78'
MF	27	(Brazil) Duda Sampaio		(substituted on) 78'
MF	28	(Brazil) Ju Ferreira		(substituted on) 90+3'
FW	9	(Brazil) Jheniffer		(substituted on) 65'
FW	22	(Brazil) Fernandinha
FW	30	(Brazil) Jaqueline
Manager:
(Brazil) Arthur Elias

*Victória (Corinthians) missed a penalty kick in the 17th minute.

Assistant referees:
Nancy Fernández (Paraguay)
Nadia Weiler (Paraguay)
Fourth official:
Emikar Calderas (Venezuela)
Fifth official:
Migdalia Rodríguez (Venezuela)
Video assistant referee:
Jenny Arias (Colombia)
Assistant video assistant referees:
Mónica Amboya (Ecuador)
Susana Corella (Ecuador)

Match rules

- 90 minutes.
- Penalty shoot-out if scores still level.
- Nine named substitutes.
- Maximum of five substitutions.

== Statistics ==
=== Top goalscorers ===
Rank	Player	Team	Goals
1	(Brazil) Priscila	(Brazil) Internacional	8
2	(Brazil) Bia Zaneratto	(Brazil) Palmeiras	6
2	(Brazil) Millene	(Brazil) Corinthians	6
4	(Brazil) Amanda Gutierres	(Brazil) Palmeiras	5
4	(Colombia) Manuela González	(Colombia) Atlético Nacional/Formas Íntimas	5
6	(Colombia) Diana Celis	(Colombia) Santa Fe	4
6	(Brazil) Laís Estevam	(Brazil) Palmeiras	4
8	(Chile) Yastin Jiménez	(Chile) Colo-Colo	3
8	(Brazil) Letícia Monteiro	(Brazil) Internacional	3
8	(Ecuador) Madelin Riera	(Ecuador) Barcelona	3
8	(Brazil) Soll	(Brazil) Internacional	3
8	(Colombia) Catalina Usme	(Colombia) América	3
8	(Brazil) Victória	(Brazil) Corinthians	3

=== Final ranking ===
As per statistical convention in football, matches decided in extra time were counted as wins and losses, while matches decided by penalty shoot-out were counted as draws.

Pos	Team	Pld	W	D	L	GF	GA	GD	Pts	Final result
1st place, gold medalist(s)	(Brazil) Corinthians	6	5	1	0	18	1	+17	16	Champions
2nd place, silver medalist(s)	(Brazil) Palmeiras	6	5	0	1	24	5	+19	15	Runners-up
3rd place, bronze medalist(s)	(Colombia) Atlético Nacional/Formas Íntimas	6	4	0	2	15	12	+3	12	Third place
4	(Brazil) Internacional	6	4	1	1	19	8	+11	13	Fourth place
5	Universidad de Chile	4	2	1	1	5	4	+1	7 (Note: Goal difference in quarter-finals: Universidad de Chile −1, Colo-Colo −2, América −4, Olimpia −6)	Eliminated in Quarter-finals
6	(Chile) Colo-Colo	4	2	0	2	11	7	+4	6	Eliminated in Quarter-finals
7	(Colombia) América	4	1	1	2	7	9	−2	4	Eliminated in Quarter-finals
8	(Paraguay) Olimpia	4	2	0	2	6	10	−4	6	Eliminated in Quarter-finals
9	(Colombia) Santa Fe	3	1	1	1	6	3	+3	4	Eliminated in Group stage
10	(Argentina) Boca Juniors	3	1	1	1	6	7	−1	4	Eliminated in Group stage
11	(Ecuador) Barcelona	3	1	0	2	5	10	−5	3	Eliminated in Group stage
12	(Paraguay) Libertad/Limpeño	3	1	0	2	3	10	−7	3	Eliminated in Group stage
13	(Peru) Universitario	3	0	0	3	1	8	−7	0	Eliminated in Group stage
14	(Venezuela) Caracas	3	0	0	3	2	12	−10	0	Eliminated in Group stage
15	(Bolivia) Always Ready	3	0	0	3	3	14	−11	0	Eliminated in Group stage
16	(Uruguay) Nacional	3	0	0	3	1	12	−11	0	Eliminated in Group stage

Rules for classification: For 5th to 8th place. 1) Points in quarter-finals; 2) Goal difference in quarter-finals; 3) Goals scored in quarter-finals; 4) Fewest red cards received in quarter-finals; 5) Fewest yellow cards received in quarter-finals; 6) Fewest red cards received in all matches; 7) Fewest yellow cards received in all matches; 8) Drawing of lots (Regulations Article 25).
For 9th to 16th place. 1) Points in group stage; 2) Goal difference; 3) Goals scored; 4) Fewest red cards received; 5) Fewest yellow cards received; 6) Drawing of lots (Regulations Article 26).

=== 2023 Copa Libertadores Femenina team ===
The 2023 Copa Libertadores Femenina team was a squad consisting of the eleven most impressive players at the tournament.

Pos.	Player	Team
GK	(Brazil) Lelê	(Brazil) Corinthians
DF	(Brazil) Bruna Calderan	(Brazil) Palmeiras
DF	(Brazil) Poliana	(Brazil) Palmeiras
DF	(Colombia) Daniela Arias	(Colombia) América de Cali
DF	(Brazil) Yasmin	(Brazil) Corinthians
MF	(Ecuador) Joselyn Espinales	(Colombia) Atlético Nacional
MF	(Colombia) Daniela Montoya	(Colombia) Atlético Nacional
MF	(Brazil) Gabi Portilho	(Brazil) Corinthians
FW	(Brazil) Millene	(Brazil) Corinthians
FW	(Brazil) Bia Zaneratto	(Brazil) Palmeiras
FW	(Brazil) Priscila	(Brazil) Internacional

== See also ==
- 2023 AFC Women's Club Championship
- 2023 CAF Women's Champions League
- 2023 OFC Women's Champions League
- 2022–23 and 2023–24 UEFA Women's Champions League
- 2023 Copa Libertadores
