= Triple Crown of Brazilian Football =

Unofficial title in Brazilian football

The Triple Crown of Brazilian Football (Portuguese: Tríplice coroa do futebol brasileiro) is an unofficial title given to the club that won the three most important competitions of the Brazilian football in the same year: The Brazilian triple crown would involve the two major CBF competitions, the Campeonato Brasileiro and the Copa do Brasil, as well as the state championship.

In general, in Brazil the term "triple crown" is used to win any three official titles in the same season.

Conversely, as of 2025, no team has won the continental treble of Campeonato Brasileiro, Copa do Brasil and the Copa Libertadores in the same season.

== National ==
Brazilian triple crown competitions

Men's football
Number	Competition	Competition type
1	Brazilian Football State Championship	State Championship First Level
2	Copa do Brasil	Brazilian Cup
3	Série A	Brazilian National Championship First Level

Women's football
Number	Competition	Competition type
1	Brazilian Football State Championship	Women's Football State Championship First Level
2	Supercopa do Brasil Feminino	Brazilian Women's Cup
3	Feminino Série A1	Brazilian Women's National Championship

In 1964, Santos won the Taça Brasil, which was the Brazilian national football championship contested from 1959 to 1968, the Campeonato Paulista and the Torneio Rio-São Paulo, a traditional Brazilian football competition contested between São Paulo and Rio de Janeiro teams from 1933 to 1966, in 1993 and from 1997 to 2002. In 1993, Palmeiras won the Campeonato Brasileiro Série A the Campeonato Paulista and the Torneio Rio-São Paulo.

Between 2001 and 2012, the clubs participating in the Copa Libertadores would not participate in the Copa do Brasil, meaning that a continental treble of Campeonato Brasileiro, Copa do Brasil and the Copa Libertadores in the same season would not even be possible. Teams participating in the Copa Libertadores would return to the Copa do Brasil in 2013.

In 2003, Cruzeiro the three most important Brazilian competitions in 2003. In that year the Campeonato Mineiro, the state championship of Minas Gerais, was contested in a single round robin format, and Cruzeiro, coached by Vanderlei Luxemburgo, won the competition without losing a single game. Also, Cruzeiro won the Copa do Brasil undefeated, beating Flamengo in the final of the tournament. The Série A was won with 31 wins, seven draws and eight defeats, totaling 100 points earned. The club scored 102 goals during the championship, and conceded 47. It was the first time that a Brazilian football club won the three most important championships in the same year: the state championship, the Campeonato Brasileiro and the Copa do Brasil.

In 2021, Atlético Mineiro became the second team to win the most important triple crown in Brazilian football by winning the three main national championships of the season, the Campeonato Mineiro, the Copa do Brasil and the Campeonato Brasileiro. However, the team was unable to win the continental-level triple crown after being eliminated by Palmeiras in the Copa Libertadores.

Winners in men's football
Club	State	Number won	Season(s) won	Titles won	Refs.
Santos	(São Paulo (state)) São Paulo	1	1964	Taça Brasil (defunct), Torneio Rio-São Paulo (defunct), Campeonato Paulista	
Palmeiras	(São Paulo (state)) São Paulo	1	1993	Campeonato Brasileiro Série A, Torneio Rio-São Paulo (defunct), Campeonato Paulista	
Cruzeiro	Minas Gerais	1	2003	Campeonato Brasileiro Série A, Copa do Brasil, Campeonato Mineiro	
Atlético Mineiro	Minas Gerais	1	2021	Campeonato Brasileiro Série A, Copa do Brasil, Campeonato Mineiro	

Winners in women's football
Club	State	Number won	Season(s) won	Titles won	Refs.
Corinthians	(São Paulo (state)) São Paulo	1	2023	Campeonato Brasileiro Feminino Série A1, Campeonato Paulista Feminino, Supercopa do Brasil Feminino	

== International ==
In general, the Triple Crown does not require specific titles, so other Brazilian teams have also done the feat in history and won different championships. The Intercontinental Cup and the FIFA Club World Cup are of particular importance for Brazilian football, culturally considered as a single competition, so a Triple Crown, consisting of an international cup, the national championship and the most prestigious continental competition, the Copa Libertadores, is the highest honor that a Brazilian club can achieve at the international level.

Club	State	Season/Year(s)	National Championship	Continental	Intercontinental/ Club World Cup
Santos	(São Paulo (state)) São Paulo	1962	Taça Brasil	Copa Libertadores	Intercontinental Cup
Santos (2)	(São Paulo (state)) São Paulo	1963	Taça Brasil	Copa Libertadores	Intercontinental Cup

Santos won the three most important competitions for Brazilian clubs in 1962. In that year, it won the Campeonato Paulista, the Copa Libertadores and the Taça Brasil (which, along with the Torneio Roberto Gomes Pedrosa, was recognized as an edition of the Campeonato Brasileiro in 2010). The team also won the 1962 Intercontinental Cup.

In 1963, Santos did not win the Campeonato Paulista, but won the Torneio Rio-São Paulo and the other 3 competitions won in the previous year.

In 1981, Flamengo won the Campeonato Carioca, the Copa Libertadores and the Intercontinental Cup.

In 1992, São Paulo won the Campeonato Paulista, the Copa Libertadores and the Intercontinental Cup. The following year, despite winning nothing statewide or nationally, the team won four international titles: in addition to the last two, the Supercopa Libertadores and the Recopa Sul-Americana. In 2005, São Paulo would repeat the feat of 1992, but now winning the FIFA Club World Cup.

Flamengo's run in 2019 brought them three important trophies, although they were not all won on a domestic level: the Campeonato Carioca, the Campeonato Brasileiro, and the Copa Libertadores. Flamengo was only the second Brazilian club after Santos in 1962 to achieve this kind of treble. The following season, Palmeiras were crowned winners of the Campeonato Paulista, Copa do Brasil and Copa Libertadores.

== See also ==
- Treble (association football)
- Triple Crown (disambiguation)
- Three-peat
