= Isabela Chagas =

Brazilian footballer

Isabela
Personal information
- Full name: Isabela Ferreira Costa das Chagas
- Date of birth: 23 July 2001 (age 25)
- Place of birth: Resende, Brazil
- Height: 1.68 m (5 ft 6 in)
- Position: Full-back

Team information
- Current team: Paris Saint-Germain
- Number: 12

Youth career
- São José
- 2018: Chapecoense
- 2019: Internacional

Senior career*
Years	Team	Apps	(Gls)
2018	Chapecoense	0	(0)
2019–2022	Internacional	35	(5)
2023–2024	Corinthians	30	(2)
2025	Cruzeiro	17	(2)
2025–	Paris Saint-Germain	2	(0)

International career
2018	Brazil U17	9	(0)
- * Club domestic league appearances and goals as of 22:37, 13 October 2025 (UTC)

Isabela Ferreira Costa das Chagas (born 23 July 2001), known as Isabela or sometimes as Belinha, is a Brazilian professional footballer who plays as a full-back for French Première Ligue club Paris Saint-Germain and the Brazil national team.

== Club career ==
Born in Resende, Rio de Janeiro, Isabela began her career with São José before moving to Chapecoense in 2018, where she made her senior debut in the year's Campeonato Catarinense. In 2019, she moved to Internacional, initially for the youth sides.

On 16 January 2021, after making her breakthrough with Inter's first team, Isabela renewed her contract with the club. In November 2022, after establishing herself as a starter, she agreed to a deal with Corinthians; the club announced her signing on 23 December.

On 7 November 2024, Isabela signed a pre-contract with Cruzeiro for the upcoming season. The following 19 September, she moved abroad for the first time in her career, after agreeing to a deal with Paris Saint-Germain until 2028; the French club paid a fee of around R$ 2 million for the player, which became the biggest sale of Cruzeiro's women's team.

== International career ==
Isabela represented Brazil at under-17 level in 2018 South American U-17 Women's Championship and 2018 FIFA U-17 Women's World Cup. On 9 October 2025, she received her first call-up to the full side, for two friendlies against England and Italy.

== International goals ==
No.	Date	Venue	Opponent	Score	Result	Competition
1.	2 December 2025	Estádio Municipal de Aveiro, Aveiro, Portugal	Portugal	4–0	5–0	Friendly

== Honours ==
Internacional

- Campeonato Brasileiro Feminino Sub-18: 2019
- Campeonato Gaúcho de Futebol Feminino: 2019, 2021

Corinthians

- Copa Libertadores Femenina: 2023, 2024
- Campeonato Brasileiro de Futebol Feminino Série A1: 2023, 2024
- Supercopa do Brasil Feminina: 2023, 2024
- Campeonato Paulista de Futebol Feminino: 2023

Brazil U17

- South American Under-17 Women's Football Championship: 2018

Individual

- Campeonato Brasileiro Série A1 Team of the Year: 2025
