= Andressa Pereira =

Brazilian footballer (born 1992)

Andressa
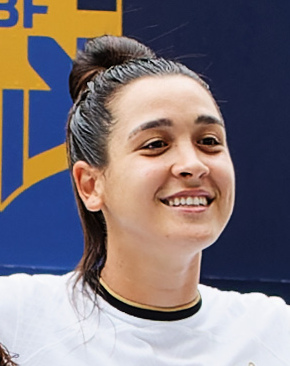
- Andressa in 2023

Personal information
- Full name: Andressa Pereira Rosa
- Date of birth: 12 May 1999 (age 27)
- Place of birth: Rio de Janeiro, Brazil
- Height: 1.77 m (5 ft 10 in)
- Position: Centre-back

Team information
- Current team: Ferroviária
- Number: 74

Youth career
- 2016: Team Chicago Brasil

Senior career*
Years	Team	Apps	(Gls)
2017	Vitória das Tabocas	7	(1)
2018–2019	Flamengo	26	(0)
2020–2021	Grêmio	29	(2)
2022–2023	Corinthians	23	(6)
2024–	Ferroviária	0	(0)

International career
2016	Brazil U17		
2017–2018	Brazil U20	1	(0)
- * Club domestic league appearances and goals as of 18:23, 13 February 2024 (UTC)

Andressa Pereira Rosa (born 12 May 1999), known as Andressa Pereira or just Andressa, is a Brazilian footballer who plays as a centre-back for Ferroviária.

== Club career ==
=== Vitória das Tabocas ===
Born in Rio de Janeiro, Andressa played for local side Team Chicago Brasil as a youth before making her senior debut with Vitória das Tabocas in 2017. Andressa scored on her league debut against Sport Recife on 12 April 2017, scoring in the 28th minute.

=== Flamengo ===
On 20 March 2018, she and her sister moved to Flamengo. Andressa made her league debut against Audax on the 31 May 2018.

=== Grêmio ===
On 23 January 2020, Andressa signed for Grêmio. She made her league debut against Minas Brasilia on 8 February 2020. Andressa scored her first goal for the club against Iranduba on 9 September 2020, scoring in the 2nd minute.

=== Corinthians ===
On 7 January 2022, after being a regular starter, she was announced at Corinthians. Andressa made her league debut against RB Bragantino on 5 March 2022. She scored her first goal for the club against CRESSPOM on 15 May 2022, scoring in the 45th+5th minute.

=== Ferroviária ===
On 3 January 2024, after losing space at Timão, Andressa moved to Ferroviária with teammate Katiuscia.

== International career ==
Andressa made her debut for the Brazil U20s against the United States U20s on 11 December 2017.

== Personal life ==
Andressa's twin sister Stefane is also a footballer who plays as a goalkeeper. Both played together at Vitória and Flamengo.

== Honours ==
Flamengo

- Campeonato Carioca de Futebol Feminino: 2018, 2019

Corinthians

- Supercopa do Brasil de Futebol Feminino: 2022, 2023
- Campeonato Brasileiro de Futebol Feminino Série A1: 2022, 2023
- Copa Paulista de Futebol Feminino: 2022
- Copa Libertadores Femenina: 2023

Brazil U20

- South American U-20 Women's Championship: 2018

=== Individual ===
- Bola de Prata: 2022
