= Lais Estevam =

Brazilian footballer

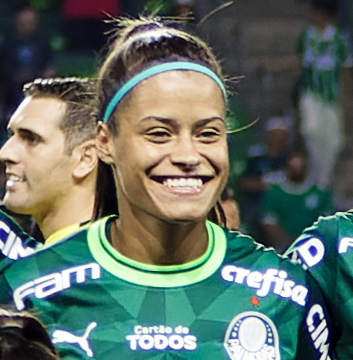
- Estevam playing for Palmeiras

Personal information
- Full name: Lais Estevam Ribeiro Carvalho
- Date of birth: 26 November 2000 (age 25)
- Place of birth: São Paulo, Brazil
- Height: 1.69 m (5 ft 7 in)
- Position: Attacking midfielder

Team information
- Current team: Palmeiras
- Number: 26

Youth career
- Portuguesa
- 2014–2018: Tiger Academia

Senior career*
Years	Team	Apps	(Gls)
2018–2019	Lviv		
2020	AD Taubaté		
2021–2022	Grêmio	23	(9)
2023–	Palmeiras	18	(4)
- * Club domestic league appearances and goals as of 04:18, 25 March 2024 (UTC)

Lais Estevam Ribeiro Carvalho (born 26 November 2000), known as Lais Estevam or just Lais, is a Brazilian professional footballer who plays for Palmeiras. Mainly an attacking midfielder, she can also play as a forward.

== Club career ==
Born in São Paulo, Lais began her career with Portuguesa and played for Tiger Academia before moving to Ukraine in 2018, with FC Lviv. In January 2020, she returned to her home country after being announced at AD Taubaté.

On 5 February 2021, Lais signed for Grêmio. She helped her side to win the 2022 Campeonato Gaúcho, before joining Palmeiras on 11 January 2023.

== International career ==
On 15 March 2024, Lais was called up to the Brazil national team by coach Arthur Elias for the 2024 SheBelieves Cup.

== Honours ==
Grêmio

- Campeonato Gaúcho de Futebol Feminino: 2022
