= Kemelli Trugilho =

Brazilian footballer (born 1999)

Personal information
- Full name: Kemelli Trugilho Firmiano Ferreira
- Date of birth: 13 March 1999 (age 27)
- Place of birth: Petrópolis, Brazil
- Height: 1.75 m (5 ft 9 in)
- Position: Goalkeeper

Team information
- Current team: Fluminense
- Number: 99

Youth career
- Criciúma

Senior career*
| Years | Team | Apps | (Gls) |
| 2016 | Juventus-SC | | |
| 2017 | Iranduba | | |
| 2017 | 3B | | |
| 2018 | Flamengo | | |
| 2019 | Santos | | |
| 2020 | Internacional | | |
| 2021–2025 | Corinthians | | |
| 2023 | Cruzeiro (loan) | | |
| 2026– | Fluminense | | |

International career^{‡}
| 2016 | Brazil U17 | | |
| 2018 | Brazil U20 | | |
| 2026– | Brazil | | |
- * Club domestic league appearances and goals as of 22 May 2026 ‡ National team caps and goals as of 22 May 2026

Kemelli Trugilho Firmiano Ferreira (born 13 March 1999), simply known as Kemelli, is a Brazilian professional footballer who plays as a goalkeeper for the Fluminense of the Brasileirão and the Brazil national team.

== Club career ==
Born in Petrópolis, Rio de Janeiro, Kemelli began playing in the youth team of Criciúma.

Kemelli played for several teams in the Brasileirão before settling at Corinthians, where she was a key player in the team’s numerous titles during his time there.

== International career ==
Kemelli played for the Brazilian national youth teams. In 2016, she competed in the U-17 World Cup, and in 2018, she played in the U-20 World Cup. Her first call-up to the senior national team came in 2026, for a series of friendly matches against the United States national team.

== Honours ==
=== Club ===
Flamengo

- Campeonato Carioca: 2018

Corinthians

- Brasileirão Feminino: 2021, 2022, 2023, 2024 and 2025
- Copa Libertadores: 2021, 2023 and 2025
- Paulistão F: 2021 and 2023
- Supercopa do Brasil: 2022 and 2024

=== International ===
Brazil national team

- CONMEBOL Sub-20: 2018
