= Verônica Marques =

Brazilian footballer (born 1996)

Verônica Martins Marques (born September 6, 1996) is a Brazilian professional footballer who plays as a striker in the Albanian Premier League KFF Vllaznia Shkodër.

== Career ==
Marques was born in Mogi das Cruzes. She started her career as a football player at a young age in the clubs of her city.

Mrs Martins Marques attended Mogi das Cruzes High School in Mogi das Cruzes.

She was scouted by the Women's Football Team of Monroe College in 2014.

In 2016, she decided to leave Monroe College to join the Women's football of Franklin Pierce University. She is graduated in 2018.

In January she decided to start her career as a professional woman footballer.

=== Youth career ===
She played her entire career in the biggest women's football club in her city before moving abroad in 2014.

- 2006-2014: CA Mogi das Cruzes Feminino, Mogi das Cruzes (Brazil)
- 2014-2016: Monroe College, New York City (US) 26 goals / 11 assists
- 2016-2018: Franklin Pierce University, Rindge (US) 21 goals / 14 assists

=== Professional career ===
In 2019, she left the United States to begin her professional career in Brazil

- 2019-2021: São José EC, São José dos Campos (Brazil) 15 goals / 5 assists
- 2021-2022: Club Puebla Femenil, Puebla (Mexico) 16 goals / 6 assists
- 2022: Maccabi Kishronot Hadera F.C. (Israel)
- 2022-: KFF Vllaznia Shkodër (Albania) 8 goals / 3 assists

== Personal life ==
Mrs Martins Marques speaks fluently English, Portuguese and Spanish

== Honors ==
- Best stryker of the club 2021-2022
- Best foreigner of the season 2021-2022
