= Priscila (footballer, born 2004) =

Brazilian footballer

Personal information
- Full name: Priscila Flor da Silva
- Date of birth: 22 August 2004 (age 22)
- Place of birth: São Gonçalo do Amarante, Brazil
- Height: 1.70 m (5 ft 7 in)
- Position: Forward

Team information
- Current team: América
- Number: 9

Youth career
- 2021–2023: Internacional

Senior career*
Years	Team	Apps	(Gls)
2021–2024	Internacional	26	(8)
2024–	América	23	(13)

International career
2022–	Brazil U20	4	(1)
2023–	Brazil	5	(1)
Medal record
Women's football
Representing Brazil
Olympic Games
Silver medal – second place	2024 Paris
- * Club domestic league appearances and goals as of 15:24, 17 November 2023 (UTC)

Priscila Flor da Silva (born 22 August 2004), simply known as Priscila, is a Brazilian professional footballer who plays as a forward for Liga MX Femenil side Club América and the Brazil women's national football team.

== Club career ==
=== Internacional (2021–2024) ===
Priscila was born in São Gonçalo do Amarante, Rio Grande do Norte, and joined Internacional on 3 October 2021 after being spotted in a seven-a-side tournament. She made her senior debut two days later, coming on as a second-half substitute and scoring a brace in a 10–0 Campeonato Gaúcho home routing of Elite

Priscila was the top scorer of the 2023 Copa Libertadores Femenina, scoring eight goals in just six matches.

=== Club América (2024–present) ===
On 12 September 2024, Internacional announced that it had reached an agreement with Liga MX Femenil side Club América to transfer Priscila to América for a $497,403 usd fee plus performance-based bonuses, making this the largest transfer fee received by a Brazilian women’s football club, the most expensive acquisition by a Liga MX Femenil club, and one of the most expensive transfers in women’s football. Inter also stated that they would receive a 20 percent fee of any future transfer of Priscila from América to another club.

Priscila made her debut with América on 26 September 2024, coming as a substitute in a week 12 league match against Santos Laguna as part of the Apertura 2025 tournament. She scored her first goal with América four days later on 30 September 2024, in a week 13 league match against Club Tijuana in which she was part of the starting line-up. During América's campaign winning the Clausura 2025, Priscila left the game against FC Juárez with a knee injury. Returning two months later at the third place match of the 2024–25 CONCACAF W Champions Cup, Priscila injured the same knee, and once given a diagnosis of anterior cruciate ligament injury took a break in her career to recover. By then she had scored 13 goals in 24 games for América.

== International career ==
Priscila represented Brazil at under-20 level in 2022 before being called up to the full side by manager Arthur Elias for friendlies against Japan and Nicaragua on 10 November 2023. She played in two FIFA U-20 Women's World Cup editions, winning a bronze medal in 2022 and leaving 2024 in the quarterfinals.

Priscila played in the 2024 Summer Olympics, winning the silver medal. She helped Brazil open the score in the semifinal against Spain, as she advanced on goalkeeper Cata Coll doing a goal kick, and the ball bounced on Priscila before hitting defender Irene Paredes, leading to an own goal. Priscila's taunting celebration screaming at Coll's face received great repercussion, with her later explaining that it was "a way of letting out all of the emotions that had built up over those few days”, particularly after hearing the Spanish players mocking the Brazilians on the way to the pitch.

== International goals ==
No.	Date	Venue	Opponent	Score	Result	Competition
1.	30 November 2023	Arena Corinthians, São Paulo, Brazil	Japan	4–3	4–3	Friendly

== Honours ==
Internacional

- Campeonato Gaúcho de Futebol Feminino: 2021, 2023

Brazil

- Summer Olympics silver medal: 2024

Club América

- Liga MX Femenil: Clausura 2026
- CONCACAF W Champions Cup: 2025–26
