= Katiuscia =

Brazilian footballer

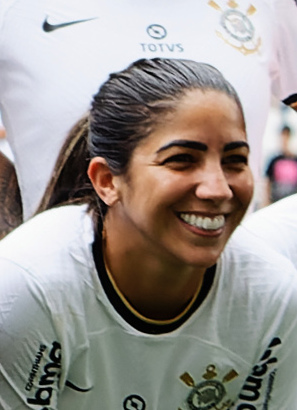

Personal information
- Full name: Katiuscia Fernandes Soares
- Date of birth: 8 August 1994 (age 32)
- Place of birth: Santos, Brazil
- Height: 1.60 m (5 ft 3 in)
- Position: Right back

Team information
- Current team: Ferroviária
- Number: 94

Senior career*
Years	Team	Apps	(Gls)
2012–2013	XV de Piracicaba		
2014	ABD Botucatu		
2014	Rio Preto		
2015–2017	Santos	19	(0)
2018–2023	Corinthians	86	(4)
2024–	Ferroviária	4	(0)
- * Club domestic league appearances and goals as of 21:49, 17 April 2024 (UTC)

Katiuscia Fernandes Soares (born 8 August 1994), simply known as Katiuscia, is a Brazilian professional footballer who plays for Ferroviária. Mainly a right back, she can also play as a midfielder.

== Club career ==
=== XV de Piracicaba ===
Born in Santos but raised in São Vicente, both in the São Paulo state, Katiuscia began her career at the age of 18 with XV de Piracicaba.

=== Santos ===
Katiuscia later played for ABD Botucatu and Rio Preto before joining Santos in 2015. She made her league debut against Iranduba on 23 September 2015.

A backup option as a midfielder at Peixe, Katiuscia was converted into a right-back during the 2017 season, after Giovana suffered an injury.

=== Corinthians ===
On 2 January 2018, she moved to Corinthians. Katiuscia made her league debut against São Francisco BA on 25 April 2018. She scored her first league goal against Pinheirense on 17 April 2018, scoring in the 85th minute.

A regular starter, Katiuscia suffered a knee injury in February 2022, being sidelined for nine months.

=== Ferroviária ===
Katiuscia made her league debut against Botafogo on 15 March 2024.

== International career ==
On 1 September 2023, Katiuscia was one of the nine Corinthians player called up by their former head coach Arthur Elias to the Brazil national team, for a period of trainings.

== Personal life ==
Katiuscia studied a Management Process scholarship at Universidade Brasil.

== Honours ==
Santos

- Campeonato Brasileiro de Futebol Feminino Série A1: 2017

Corinthians

- Campeonato Brasileiro de Futebol Feminino Série A1: 2018, 2020, 2021, 2022, 2023
- Campeonato Paulista de Futebol Feminino: 2019, 2020, 2021
- Copa Libertadores Femenina: 2019, 2021, 2023
- Supercopa do Brasil de Futebol Feminino: 2022, 2023
- Copa Paulista de Futebol Feminino: 2022

Individual

- Bola de Prata: 2023, 2024
