= Carol Nogueira =

Brazilian footballer (born 1992)

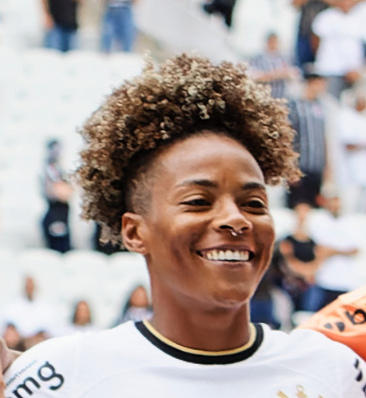
- Carol Nogueira in 2023

Personal information
- Full name: Ana Caroline Nogueira Corrêa
- Date of birth: 3 November 1992 (age 34)
- Place of birth: Duque de Caxias, Brazil
- Height: 1.65 m (5 ft 5 in)
- Position: Forward

Team information
- Current team: Corinthians
- Number: 77

Senior career*
Years	Team	Apps	(Gls)
2008–2014	CEPE-Caxias		
2015	Estrela Real		
2015–2016	Duque de Caxias	4	(2)
2017	XV de Piracicaba		
2017–2018	América Mineiro	6	(7)
2018	Rio Preto	12	(9)
2018	Ipatinga		
2019	Maccabi Kiryat Gat	13	(5)
2019	Avaí/Kindermann	8	(1)
2020–2022	São Paulo	35	(7)
2023–	Corinthians	10	(1)

International career
2008	Brazil U17		
- * Club domestic league appearances and goals as of 18:23, 13 February 2024 (UTC)

Ana Caroline Nogueira Corrêa (born 3 November 1992), known as Carol Nogueira or just Carol, is a Brazilian footballer who plays for Corinthians. Mainly a forward, she can also play as an attacking midfielder.

== Club career ==
Carol Nogueira was born in Duque de Caxias, Rio de Janeiro, and began her career with hometown side CEPE-Caxias. In 2015, she moved to Estrela Real, but soon returned to Duque de Caxias before joining XV de Piracicaba in 2017.

During the 2018 season, Carol Nogueira represented América Mineiro, Rio Preto and Ipatinga, which led her to a move abroad to Israeli side Maccabi Kiryat Gat. Back to her home country shortly after, she signed for Avaí/Kindermann.

On 17 January 2020, Carol Nogueira joined São Paulo. After being a regular starter during her first two seasons, she suffered a knee injury in November 2021.

On 26 December 2022, Carol Nogueira was announced at Corinthians.

== International career ==
After representing Brazil at under-17 level in the 2008 FIFA U-17 Women's World Cup, Carol Nogueira received her first call-up to the full side by coach Pia Sundhage on 2 September 2020, for a period of trainings.

== Honours ==
CEPE-Caxias

- Copa do Brasil de Futebol Feminino: 2010
- Campeonato Carioca de Futebol Feminino: 2011

Avaí/Kindermann

- Campeonato Catarinense de Futebol Feminino: 2019

Corinthians

- Supercopa do Brasil de Futebol Feminino: 2023
- Campeonato Brasileiro de Futebol Feminino Série A1: 2023

=== Individual ===
- Bola de Prata: 2021
