= Karol Alves =

Brazilian footballer

Karolainy Caline Alves
Personal information
- Date of birth: 30 April 1997 (age 29)
- Place of birth: Baixo Guandu, Brazil
- Height: 1.70 m (5 ft 7 in)
- Position: Goalkeeper

Team information
- Current team: ŽNK Split
- Number: 1

Youth career
- 2015: Vila Velha ES

Senior career*
Years	Team	Apps	(Gls)
2015–2017	Vila Velha ES		
2018	América Mineiro		
2018	Ipatinga	10	
2019	Osasco Audax	3	
2019–	ŽNK Split	10	
- * Club domestic league appearances and goals as of 23:52, 9 July 2020 (UTC)

Karolainy "Karol" Caline Alves (born 30 April 1997) is a Brazilian footballer who plays for Croatian football team ŽNK Split.

== Career ==
Karol Alves was born into a middle-class family in Mauá neighborhood, Baixo Guandu, a city in the Brazilian northwestern region of Espírito Santo. She began her career in 2015 at Vila Velha ES from Vila Velha where she won 2 regional championships. In 2018 she joined América Mineiro where she won her first regional cup, she then transferred to Ipatinga later the same year. In 2019, she joined Osasco Audax where she won three clean sheets in three matches, due to her performance, she was signed by ŽNK Split in June 2019, helping them win their first ever Croatian women's league title. She made her first UEFA Women's Champions League appearances for ŽNK Split at the 2019–20 UEFA Women's Champions League qualifying round.
