= Milagros Arruela =

Peruvian footballer (born 1992)

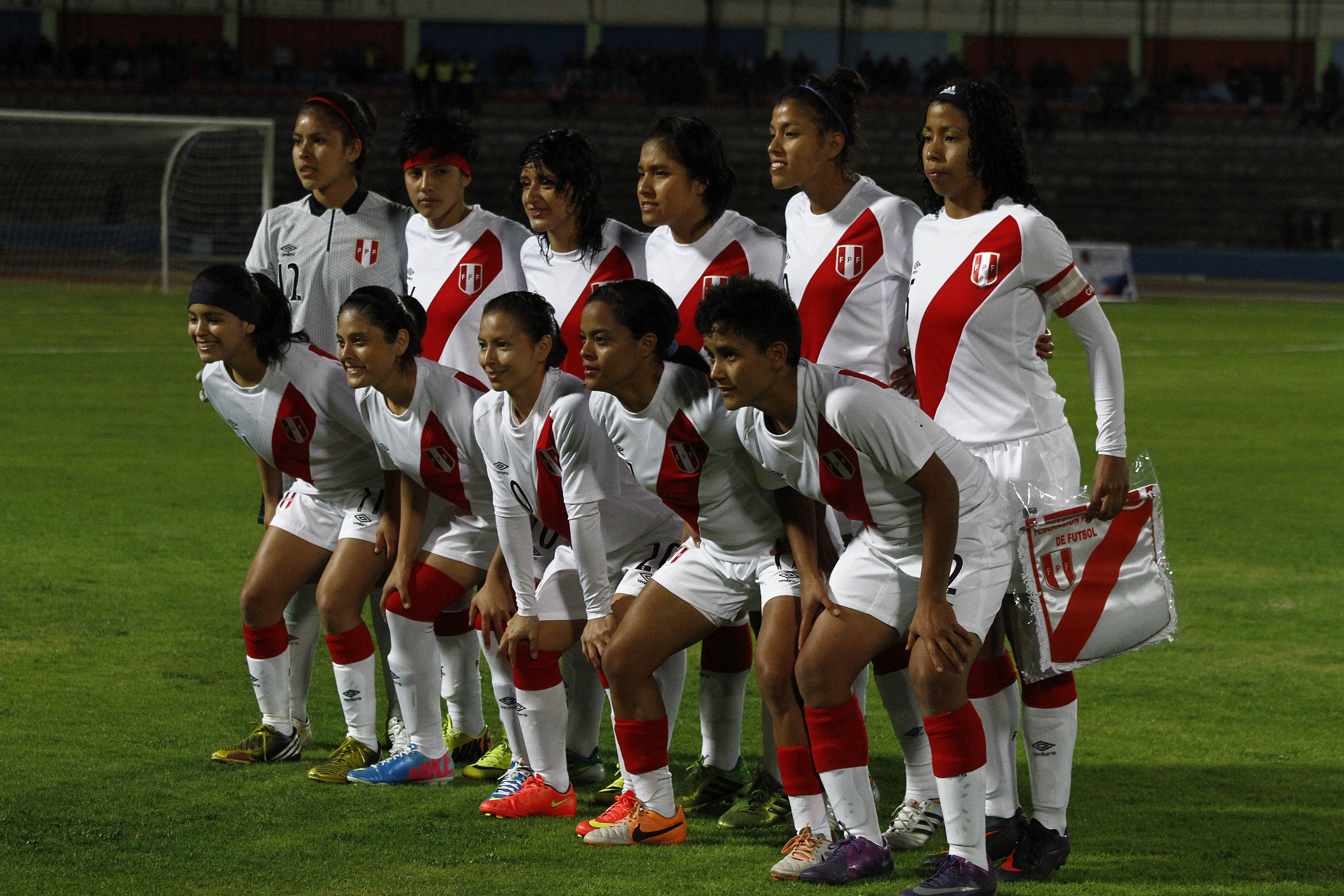
- Arruela representing Peru at the 2014 Copa América Femenina

Personal information
- Full name: Milagros Nataly Arruela Patiño
- Date of birth: 11 October 1992 (age 34)
- Place of birth: Lima, Peru
- Height: 1.65 m (5 ft 5 in)
- Position: Defender

Senior career*
Years	Team	Apps	(Gls)
- Real Maracaná
- El Agustino

International career^{‡}
2014–2018	Peru	6	(0)
- * Club domestic league appearances and goals ‡ National team caps and goals as of 12 April 2018

Milagros Nataly Arruela Patiño (born 11 October 1992) is a Peruvian footballer who plays as a defender. She was a member of the Peru women's national team. She is also a referee.

== International career ==
Arruela played for Peru at senior level in two Copa América Femenina editions (2014 and 2018). She appeared at the 2019 Pan American Games as a referee and a fourth official.
