= Letícia Izidoro =

Brazilian footballer (born 1994)

Lelê
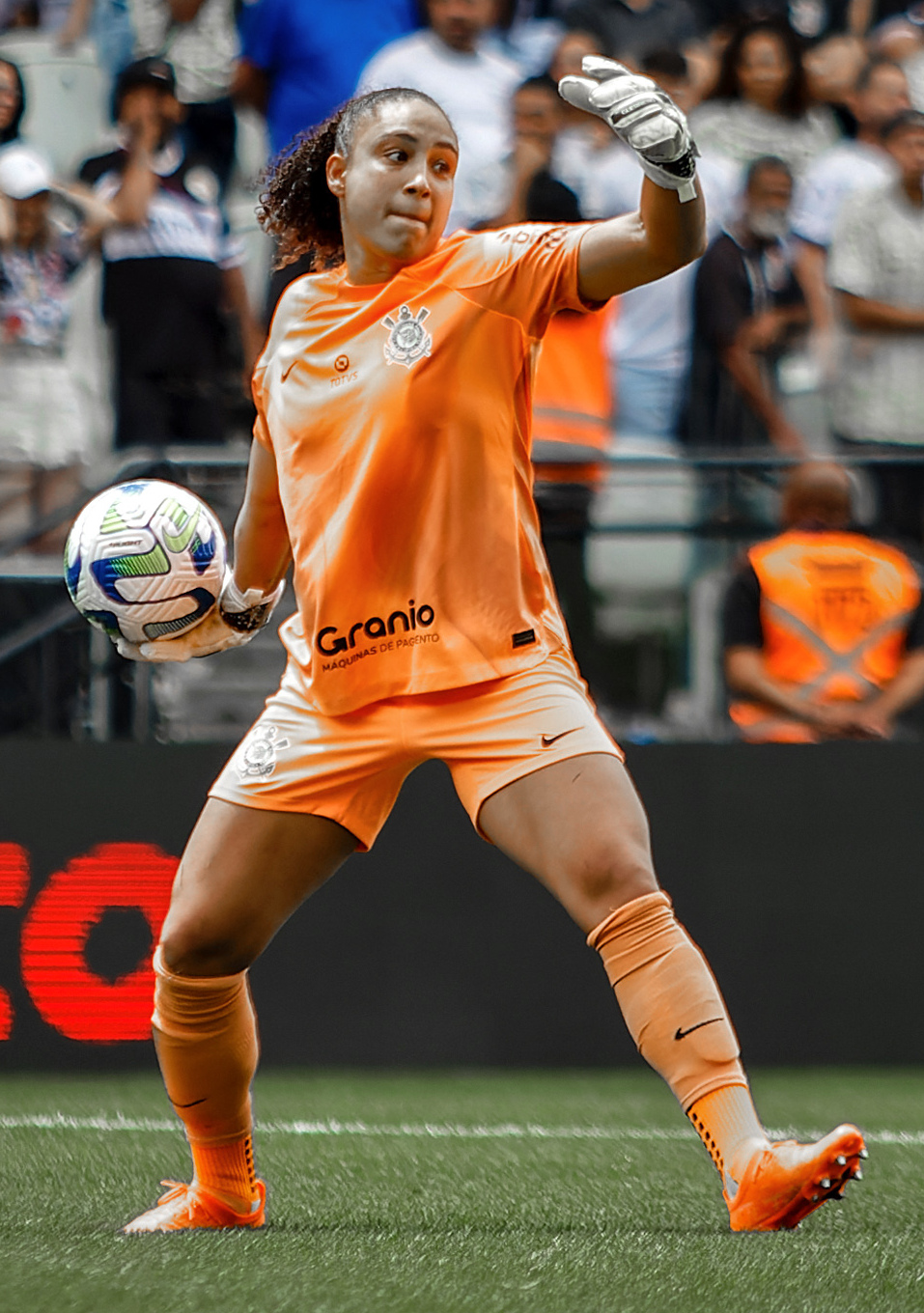
- Lelê with Corinthians in 2023

Personal information
- Full name: Letícia Izidoro Lima da Silva
- Date of birth: 13 August 1994 (age 32)
- Place of birth: Oswaldo Cruz, Rio de Janeiro, Brazil
- Height: 1.75 m (5 ft 9 in)
- Position: Goalkeeper

Team information
- Current team: Corinthians
- Number: 12

Youth career
- América
- 2010: Kindermann
- 2011–2012: Vitória das Tabocas

Senior career*
| Years | Team | Apps | (Gls) |
| 2012 | Vitória das Tabocas | | |
| 2013 | Kindermann | 4 | (0) |
| 2014 | São José | | (0) |
| 2015 | Centro Olímpico | 6 | (0) |
| 2016–2021 | Corinthians | 84 | (0) |
| 2021–2022 | Benfica | 20 | (0) |
| 2022– | Corinthians | 47 | (0) |

International career^{‡}
| 2012–2014 | Brazil U20 | 3 | (0) |
| 2015– | Brazil | 26 | (0) |
- * Club domestic league appearances and goals as of 27 January 2026 ‡ National team caps and goals as of 27 January 2026

Letícia Izidoro Lima da Silva (born 13 August 1994), commonly known as Letícia or Lelê, is a Brazilian professional football goalkeeper for Brazilian club Corinthians and the Brazilian national team. She was part of the Brazil squad at the 2015 FIFA Women's World Cup.

== Club career ==
=== Kindermann ===
Letícia made her league debut against Foz Cataratas on 18 September 2013.

=== São José ===
Letícia played in the 2014 Club World Cup that was not validated by Fifa. São José beat Arsenal 2–0 to win the Women's Club World Cup.

=== Centro Olímpico ===
Letícia made her league debut against Santos on 30 September 2015.

=== First spell at Corinthians ===
A draft in February 2016 assigned Brazil women's national football team players Letícia and Rafinha to a combined Corinthians Audax team, who went on to win the 2016 Copa do Brasil de Futebol Feminino. She made her league debut against Iranduba on 24 March 2016.

In October 2017 Corinthians Audax won the 2017 Copa Libertadores Femenina. Letícia made two saves in a penalty shootout win over Colo-Colo following a 0–0 draw in the final at Estadio Arsenio Erico, Asunción.

=== Second spell at Corinthians ===
Letícia rejoined Corinthians in 2022. During her second spell, she made her league debut against RB Bragantino on 5 March 2022.

== International career ==
Letícia represented Brazil's youth team at the 2010 FIFA U-17 Women's World Cup in Trinidad and Tobago. After graduating to the under-20 team, she attended the FIFA U-20 Women's World Cup in 2012 and 2014.

In December 2015, she won a cap for the senior Brazil women's national football team at the 2015 International Women's Football Tournament of Natal, appearing as a substitute for Bárbara in an 11–0 win over Trinidad and Tobago.

== Personal life ==
Letícia is dating Mariana Dantas.

== Honours ==
Benfica

- Campeonato Nacional Feminino: 2020–21
- Taça da Liga: 2020–21

Corinthians

- Copa Libertadores Femenina: 2023, 2024, 2025
- Campeonato Brasileiro Série A1: 2023, 2024, 2025
- Supercopa do Brasil: 2023, 2024
- Campeonato Paulista: 2023
