= Arena Inamar =

Football stadium in Diadema, São Paulo, Brazil

- Distrital do Inamar
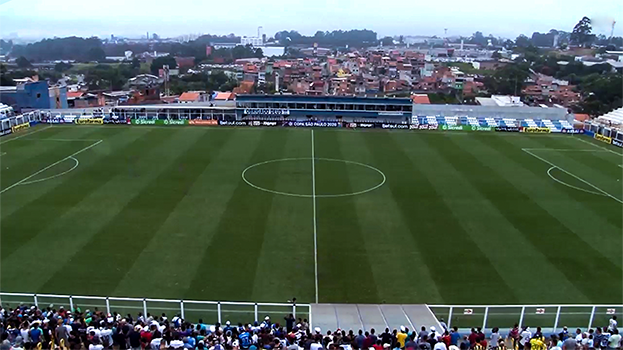
- Interactive map of Arena Inamar
- Full name: Estádio Municipal José Batista Pereira Fernandes
- Location: Diadema, SP, Brazil
- Coordinates: 23.722610799838492°S 46.613087791572255°W
- Owner: City of Diadema
- Operator: City of Diadema
- Capacity: 10,000
- Surface: Natural grass
- Record attendance: 7,283 (Água Santa vs São Bernardo, 10 April 2016)
- Field size: 105 by 68 metres (114.8 yd × 74.4 yd)

Construction
- Opened: 22 May 2009
- Renovated: 2012, 2014, 2019–2020
- Expanded: 2015
- Cost: R$ 12–15 million

Tenants
- Clube Atlético Diadema (2009–2019); Água Santa (2012–)

Estádio Municipal José Batista Pereira Fernandes, known as Distrital do Inamar or Arena Inamar, is a football stadium in Diadema, São Paulo, Brazil. It has a maximum capacity of 10,000 people, and hosts the home matches of Água Santa.

== History ==
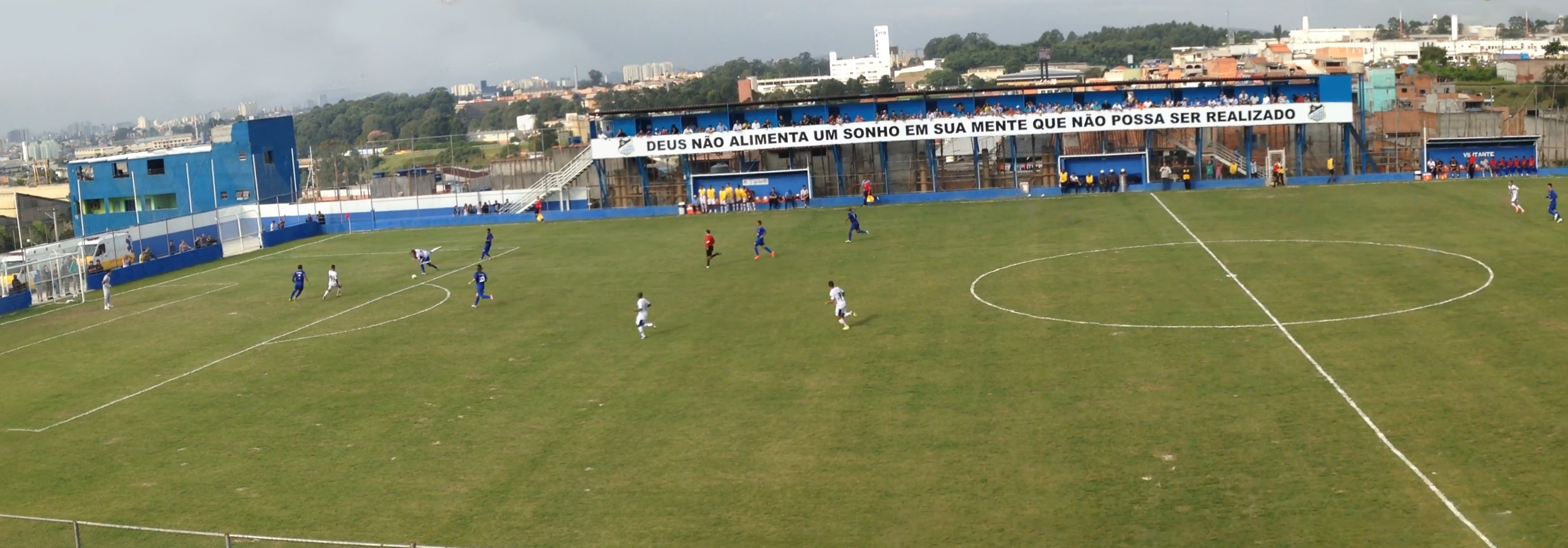
Match between Água Santa and São Caetano in 2015

Inaugurated on 22 May 2009 to attend amateur matches of the region, the stadium only held a professional match on 27 April 2013, when Clube Atlético Diadema beat Mauaense by 5–1 in a Campeonato Paulista Segunda Divisão match. It was named after José Batista Pereira Fernandes, a community leader in the local nearby neighbourhoods who devoted his life to the well-being of the people.

The stadium saw Água Santa's meteoric rise through the tiers of the Campeonato Paulista, but never had any night matches due to the lighting structure.
