= Luana (footballer) =

Brazilian footballer (born 1993)

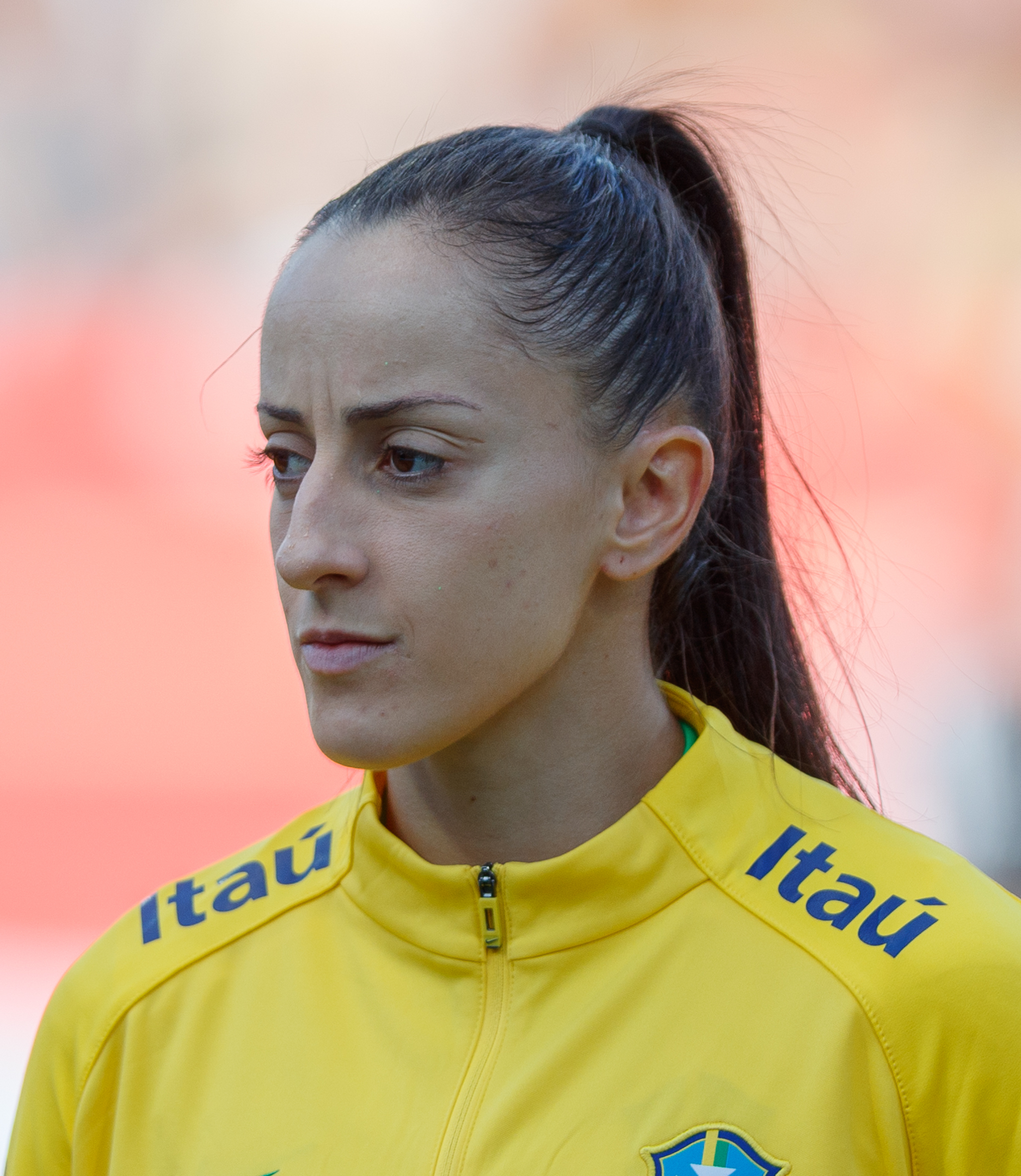
- Luana with Brazil in 2023

Personal information
- Full name: Luana Bertolucci Paixão
- Date of birth: 2 May 1993 (age 33)
- Place of birth: São Bernardo do Campo, Brazil
- Height: 1.63 m (5 ft 4 in)
- Position: Midfielder

Senior career*
Years	Team	Apps	(Gls)
2011–2014	Centro Olímpico	8	(1)
2015–2018	Avaldsnes IL	75	(16)
2019	Hwacheon KSPO	22	(8)
2020–2022	Paris Saint-Germain	17	(2)
2022–2023	Corinthians	16	(3)
2024–2026	Orlando Pride	28	(1)

International career^{‡}
2012–	Brazil	38	(2)
Medal record
Women's football
Representing Brazil
Copa América Femenina
Winner	2022 Colombia
- * Club domestic league appearances and goals as of 03:25, 8 November 2026 (UTC) ‡ National team caps and goals as of 23:35, 22 April 2024 (UTC)

Luana Bertolucci Paixão (born 2 May 1993), known as Luana, is a Brazilian professional footballer who plays as a midfielder for the Brazil national team.

== Club career ==
=== Centro Olímpico ===
Luana was attached to São Bernardo, São Caetano and Corinthians as a young player. She signed for Associação Desportiva Centro Olímpico in early 2011. Luana made her league debut against Rio Preto on 2 October 2013. She scored her first goal against Avaí on 11 September 2014, scoring in the 20th minute.

=== Avaldsnes ===
She agreed a transfer to Norwegian Toppserien club Avaldsnes for their 2015 season, which culminated in them finishing as runners-up in both the League and Norwegian Women's Cup, qualifying them to the UEFA Women's Champions League for the first time. Luana made her league debut against Arna-Bjørnar on 29 March 2015. She scored her first goal against Kolbotn on 19 April 2015, scoring in the 62nd minute.

In 2017, Luana was Avaldsnes' Player of the Year as the club won the Norwegian Women's Cup. She signed a one-year extension to her contract in November 2017.

=== Paris Saint-Germain ===
Luana joined Paris Saint-Germain on 3 January 2020 on a six-month deal. She made her league debut against Olympique Marseille on 18 January 2020. Luana extended her contract until 30 June 2021 on May 29, 2020. She scored her first league goal against Dijon on 4 October 2020.

=== Corinthians ===
Luana scored on her league debut against Ceará on 25 February 2023.

=== Orlando Pride ===
On 14 December 2023, Orlando Pride announced the signing of Luana to a two-year contract with a mutual option for 2026. She made her league debut against Racing Louisville on 16 March 2024. In April 2024, she was placed on the season-ending injury list following her cancer diagnosis.

Luana returned to the field in September 2025, making her first appearance back from her diagnosis in a CONCACAF W Champions Cup match against Alajuelense. She made 28 league appearances across three years with Orlando before departing from the club upon her expiration of her contract in November 2026.

== International career ==
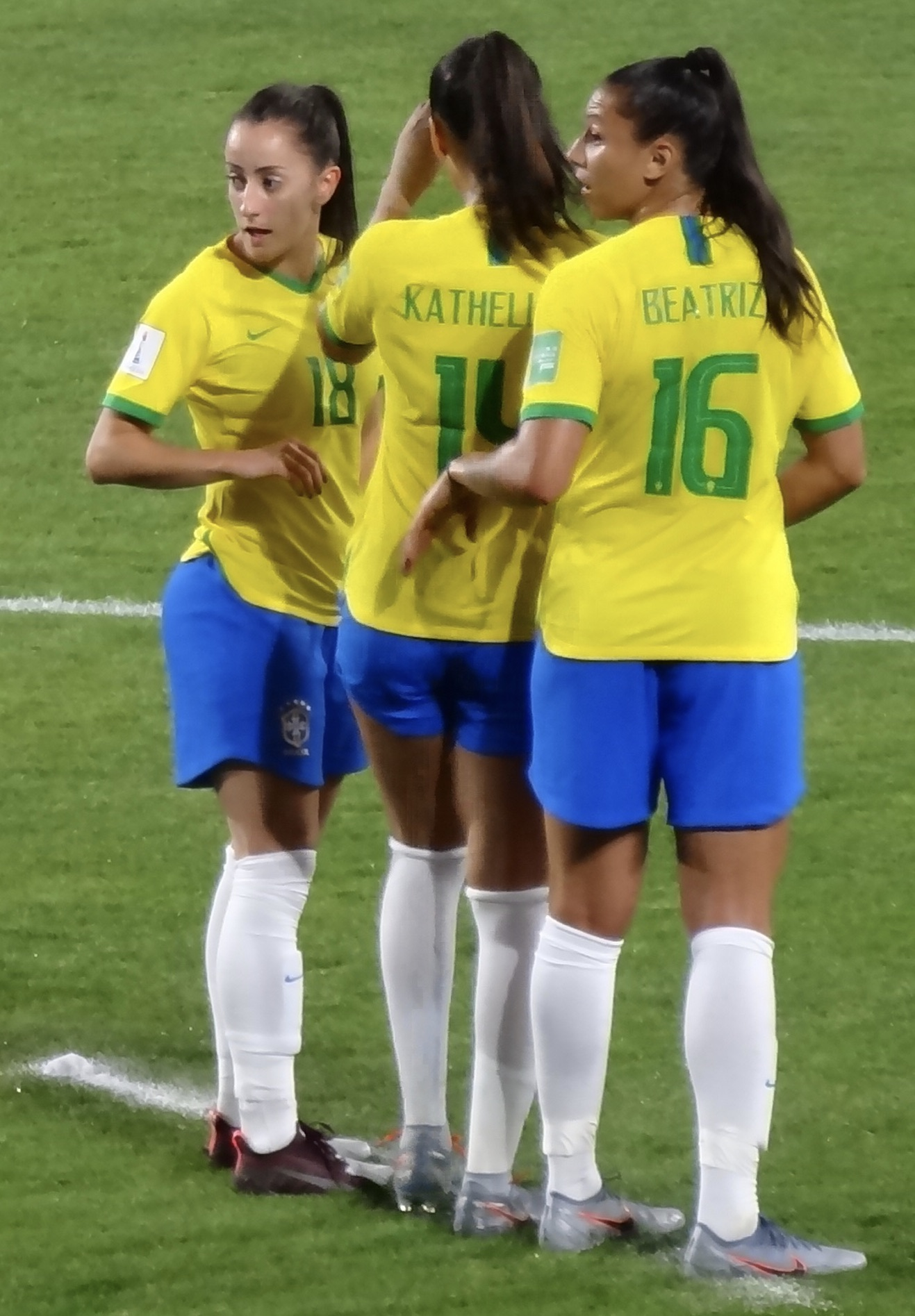
Luana (left) with Kathellen and Bia Zaneratto

Luana represented the Brazil women's national under-17 football team at the 2010 FIFA U-17 Women's World Cup in Trinidad and Tobago, where they reached the quarter-finals. After graduating to the under-20 team, she attended the FIFA U-20 Women's World Cup in 2012 in Japan.

In December 2012, she won her first cap for the senior Brazil women's national football team at the 2012 International Women's Football Tournament of City of São Paulo, appearing as a substitute for Érika in a 2–1 win over Denmark. Luana scored her first goal against Chile on 2 July 2023, scoring in the 35th minute.

Luana was absent from Brazil's final 23-player squad for the 2019 FIFA Women's World Cup when it was announced on 16 May 2019. But she was added to the group the following day, when Adriana withdrew due to a knee ligament injury.

== Personal life ==
On 29 April 2024, Luana announced that she had been diagnosed with Hodgkin lymphoma and would begin chemotherapy. On 4 October 2024, she completed her final round of chemotherapy.

== Career statistics ==
=== International ===
As of 30 November 2023

National team	Year	Apps	Goals
Brazil	2012	2	0
Brazil	2013	3	0
Brazil	2014	0	0
Brazil	2015	0	0
Brazil	2016	0	0
Brazil	2017	1	0
Brazil	2018	0	0
Brazil	2019	11	0
Brazil	2020	5	1
Brazil	2021	0	0
Brazil	2022	8	0
Brazil	2023	8	1
Total		38	2

Scores and results list Brazil's goal tally first, score column indicates score after each Luana goal.

List of international goals scored by Luana
No.	Date	Venue	Opponent	Score	Result	Competition
1	1 December 2020	Estádio do Morumbi, São Paulo, Brazil	Ecuador	2–0	8–0	Friendly
2	2 July 2023	Estádio Nacional Mané Garrincha, Brasília, Brazil	Chile	3–0	4–0	Friendly
3	6 December 2023	Fonte Luminosa, Araraquara, Brazil	Nicaragua	3–0	4–0	Friendly

== Honours ==
Avaldsnes

- Norwegian Women's Cup: 2017

Paris Saint-Germain

- Division 1 Féminine: 2020–21
- Coupe de France féminine: 2021–22

Orlando Pride

- NWSL Shield: 2024
- NWSL Championship: 2024
