= Fernanda (footballer) =

Brazilian footballer (born 1993)

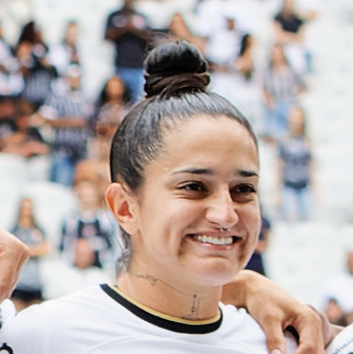
- Fernanda with Corinthians in 2023

Personal information
- Full name: Fernanda Caroline da Silva
- Date of birth: 2 November 1993 (age 33)
- Place of birth: Jundiaí, Brazil
- Height: 1.65 m (5 ft 5 in)
- Position: Attacking midfielder

Team information
- Current team: Corinthians

Senior career*
Years	Team	Apps	(Gls)
2009	Saad São Caetano		
2010	Palmeiras		
2011	Centro Olímpico		
2012–2018	Assi IF	161	(103)
2019–2020	Piteå IF	38	(9)
2021	Vittsjö GIK	21	(7)
2022	Santos	13	(4)
2023–	Corinthians	16	(3)
- * Club domestic league appearances and goals as of 18:06, 8 April 2024 (UTC)

Fernanda Caroline da Silva (born 2 November 1993), known as Fernandinha or just Fernanda, is a Brazilian footballer who plays as an attacking midfielder for Corinthians.

== Club career ==
=== Assi IF ===
Fernanda made her league debut against Bollstanäs SK on 15 April 2012. She scored her first goal against Gustafs on 26 August 2012, scoring in the 80th minute.

=== Piteå IF ===
On 7 December 2018, after seven consecutive seasons at Assi, Fernanda joined Piteå IF. She made her league debut against Växjö on 22 April 2019. Fernanda scored her first goal against Limhamn Bunkeflo on 23 May 2019, scoring in the 43rd minute.

She won the Best Midfielder of the Year in 2018.

=== Vittsjö GIK ===
On 4 January 2021, she moved to Vittsjö GIK. Fernanda scored on her league debut against Piteå on 18 April 2021, scoring in the 78th minute.

She left the club at the end of the season, to return to her home country.

=== Santos ===
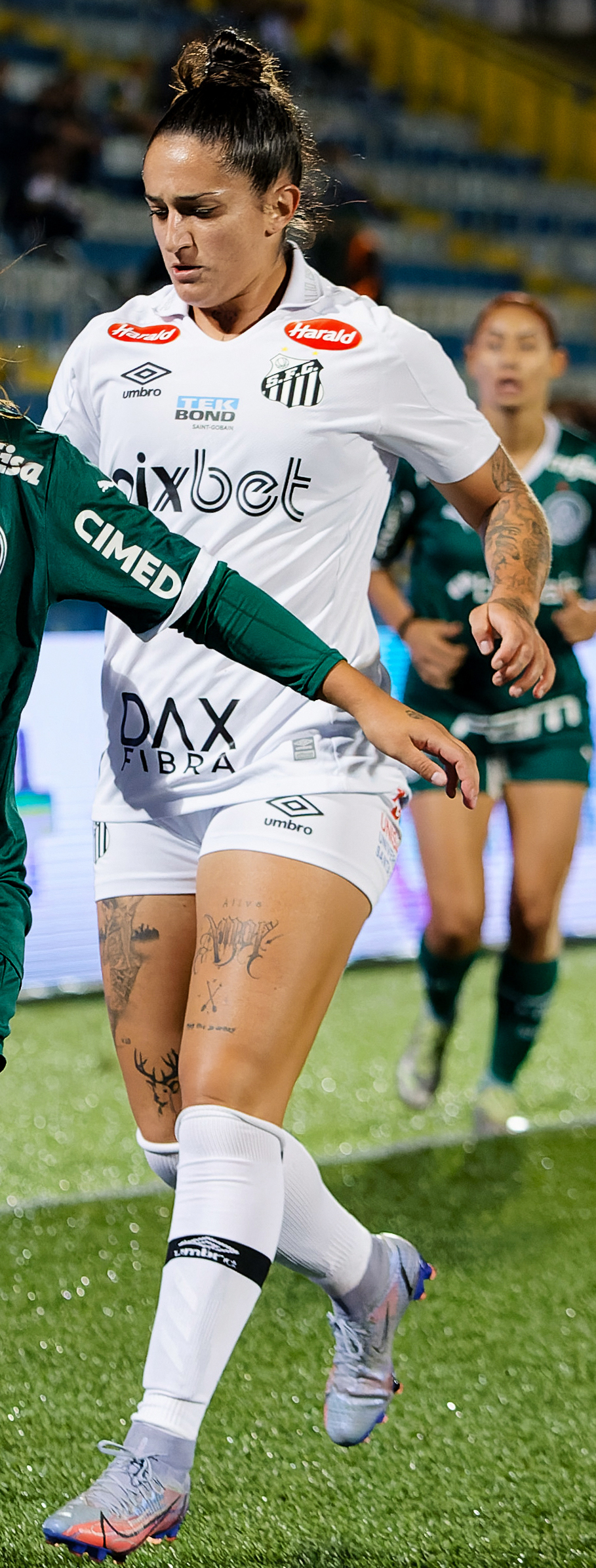
Fernanda with Santos in 2022

On 2 February 2022, Fernanda was announced at Santos. She made her league debut against Real Brasília on 6 March 2022. Fernanda scored her first goal against São José EC on 13 March 2022, scoring in the 10th minute.

A starter during most of the campaign, she left the club on 21 December.

=== Corinthians ===
After leaving Santos, Fernanda signed for Corinthians seven days later. She scored on her league debut against Ceará Sporting Club on 25 February 2023, scoring in the 72nd and 86th minute.
