= Arthur Elias =

Brazilian football manager

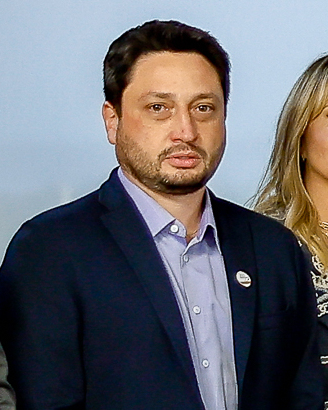
- Arthur Elias in 2025

Personal information
- Full name: Arthur José Elias Ribas
- Date of birth: 5 August 1981 (age 45)
- Place of birth: São Paulo, Brazil

Team information
- Current team: Brazil (women) (head coach)

Managerial career
- Years: Team
- 2009–2010: Nacional-SP (women)
- 2011–2015: Centro Olímpico
- 2016–2017: Audax/Corinthians (women)
- 2018–2023: Corinthians (women)
- 2023–: Brazil (women)
Medal record
Women's football
Representing Brazil (as manager)
Copa América Femenina
Winner	Ecuador 2025
Summer Olympics
Silver medal – second place	2024 Paris

Arthur José Ribas Elias (born 5 August 1981) is a Brazilian football manager, currently in charge of the Brazil women's national football team.

== Career ==
Born in São Paulo but raised in Cajuru, Arthur Elias began his career in 2006, with the women's team of the University of São Paulo, after previously studying in the university and working in women's futsal. In 2009, he was offered a managerial role at the women's side of Nacional AC.

In 2010, after two seasons in charge of Nacional, Arthur Elias joined Centro Olímpico as a supervisor, and became the manager of the women's team in the following year. He led the side to their first ever Campeonato Brasileiro title in 2013, and took over Audax under the same role in 2015.

Arthur Elias led Audax to the Copa do Brasil de Futebol Feminino title in 2016, and to the Copa Libertadores Femenina title in 2017, both when the women's team had a partnership with Corinthians. Ahead of the 2018 season, as Corinthians opted to reactivate their own women's side, he was named as their manager.

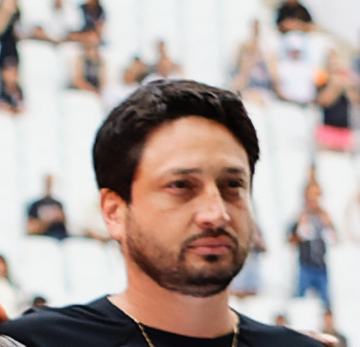
Arthur Elias as head coach of Corinthians in 2023

On 18 December 2019, after winning the 2019 Copa Libertadores Femenina, Arthur Elias renewed his contract for the 2020 season. He continued to lead the club into successful campaigns in the following years, notably winning another two Copa Libertadores Femenina titles and four consecutive Campeonato Brasileiro de Futebol Feminino Série A1 titles.

On 1 September 2023, Arthur Elias was announced as the new head coach of the Brazil women's national team, replacing Pia Sundhage; he also announced that he would remain at Corinthians until the end of the 2023 Copa Libertadores Femenina. Under Elias' management Brazil would reach the final of the football tournament of the 2024 Summer Olympics and finish with the silver, the team's first Olympic medal in 16 years.

== Managerial statistics ==
As of 1 June 2026

Managerial record by team and tenure
Team	Nat	From	To	Record								Ref.
Team	Nat	From	To	G	W	D	L	GF	GA	GD	Win %	Ref.
Centro Olímpico	(Brazil)	1 January 2011	21 November 2015	139	80	25	34	392	155	+237	57.55	
Corinthians	(Brazil)	1 January 2016	21 October 2023	335	266	44	25	1,033	201	+832	79.40	
Brazil	(Brazil)	1 September 2023	present	51	33	5	13	100	45	+55	64.71	
Total				518	374	74	70	1,525	401	+1124	72.20	—

== Honours ==
Centro Olímpico

- Campeonato Brasileiro de Futebol Feminino Série A1: 2013

Corinthians (Note: Corinthians had a partnership with Audax from 2016 to 2017. They created their own team for the 2018 season.)

- Copa Libertadores Femenina: 2017, 2019, 2021, 2023
- Campeonato Brasileiro de Futebol Feminino Série A1: 2018, 2020, 2021, 2022, 2023
- Copa do Brasil de Futebol Feminino: 2016
- Supercopa do Brasil Feminina: 2022, 2023
- Campeonato Paulista de Futebol Feminino: 2019, 2020, 2021
- Copa Paulista de Futebol Feminino: 2022

Brazil

- Copa América Femenina: 2025
- FIFA Series: 2026

=== Individual ===
- Bola de Prata Best Coach: 2021, 2022, 2023
- Campeonato Brasileiro de Futebol Feminino Série A1 Coach of the Year: 2021
- IFFHS World's Best Club Coach CONMEBOL: 2021
