= List of Brazilian women's football champions =

This list contains all the clubs that became Brazilian champions in women's football.

== Taça Brasil (1983–1992) ==
Tournament organized directly by the state federations.

Year	Champion	Runners-up
1983	Radar (1); RJ	Ponto Frio; GO
1984	Radar (2); RJ	Atlético Mineiro; MG
1985	Radar (3); RJ	Internacional; RS
1986	Radar (4); RJ	Brasília; DF
1987	Radar (5); RJ	Vila Dimas; DF
1988	Radar (6); RJ	Sul América; AM
1989	Not held	
1990	Sul América (1); AM	Independente de Tucuruí; PA
1991–1992	Not held	

== Campeonato Brasileiro (1993–2001) ==
Direct continuation of the previous championship, but now organized by the CBF.

Year	Champion	Runners-up
1993	Vasco da Gama (1); RJ	Saad; SP
1994	Vasco da Gama (2); RJ	Euroexport; BA
1995	Not held	
1996	Saad (1); SP	Vasco da Gama; RJ
1997	São Paulo (1); SP	Portuguesa; SP
1998	Vasco da Gama (3); RJ	Portuguesa; SP
1999–2000	Portuguesa (1); SP	Palmeiras; SP
2001	Santa Izabel (1); MG	Matonense; SP
2002–2005	Not held	

== Taça Brasil (2006–2007) ==
Tournament organized by the LINAF - Liga Nacional de Futebol Feminino (English: Women's Football National League).

Year	Champion	Runners-up
2006	Botucatu (1); SP	CEPE-Caxias; RJ
2007	Santos (1); SP	Botucatu; SP

== Copa do Brasil de Futebol Feminino (2007–2016) ==
Despite the name and format being a cup, due to the absence of a league at that time, it was in fact the main Brazilian women's football competition. Organized by the CBF.

In 2025 the competition returned to the schedule in the traditional national cup format, being secondary to the Campeonato Brasileiro Série A1.

Year	Champion	Runners-up
2007	MS/Saad (2); MS	Botucatu; SP
2008	Santos (2); SP	Sport; PE
2009	Santos (3); SP	Botucatu; SP
2010	Duque de Caxias/CEPE (1); RJ	Foz do Iguaçu FC; PR
2011	Foz Cataratas (1); PR	Vitória; PE
2012	São José (1); SP	Centro Olímpico; SP
2013	São José (2); SP	Vitória; PE
2014	Ferroviária (1); SP	São José; SP
2015	Kindermann (1); SC	Ferroviária; SP
2016	Audax/Corinthians (1); SP	São José; SP

== Campeonato Brasileiro Série A1 (2013–present) ==
The current Brazilian Women's Championship, Organized by the CBF. It was less important than the 2013-2016 Copa do Brasil, but with its extinction, it became the main competition of the category since 2017.

Year	Champion	Runners-up
2013	Centro Olímpico (1); SP	São José; SP
2014	Ferroviária (2); SP	Kindermann; SC
2015	Rio Preto (1); SP	São José; SP
2016	Flamengo (1); RJ	Rio Preto; SP
2017	Santos (4); SP	Corinthians; SP
2018	Corinthians (1); SP	Rio Preto; SP
2019	Ferroviária (3); SP	Corinthians; SP
2020	Corinthians (2); SP	Avaí/Kindermann; SC
2021	Corinthians (3); SP	Palmeiras; SP
2022	Corinthians (4); SP	Internacional; RS
2023	Corinthians (5); SP	Ferroviária; SP
2024	Corinthians (6); SP	São Paulo; SP
2025	Corinthians (7); SP	Cruzeiro; MG
2026	São Paulo (2); SP	Corinthians; SP

== List of Champions ==
Teams in bold stills active in women's competitions at least in state level.

Rank	Club	Winners	Winning years	Runners-up	Runners-up years
1	**Corinthians**	7	2018, 2020, 2021, 2022, 2023, 2024, 2025	3	2017, 2019, 2026
2	Radar	6	1983, 1984, 1985, 1986, 1987, 1988	0	—
3	**Santos**	4	2007 (LINAF), 2008, 2009, 2017	0	—
4	**Ferroviária**	3	2014 (CDB), 2014 (BR), 2019	2	2015 (CDB), 2023
5	**Vasco da Gama**	3	1993, 1994, 1998	1	1996
6	**São José**	2	2012, 2013 (CDB)	4	2013 (BR), 2014 (CDB), 2015 (BR), 2016 (CDB)
7	Saad	2	1996, 2007 (CDB)	1	1993
7	**São Paulo**	2	1997, 2026	1	2024
9	Botucatu	1	2006	3	2007 (LINAF), 2007 (CDB), 2009
10	Kindermann	1	2015 (CDB)	2	2014 (CDB), 2020
10	Portuguesa	1	1999–00	2	1997, 1998
10	Rio Preto	1	2015 (BR)	2	2016 (BR), 2018
13	Centro Olímpico	1	2013 (BR)	1	2012 (CDB)
13	**Duque de Caxias/CEPE**	1	2010	1	2006
13	Sul América	1	1990	1	1988
16	Grêmio Audax	1	2016 (CDB)	0	—
16	**Flamengo**	1	2016 (BR)	0	—
16	Foz Cataratas	1	2011	0	—
16	Santa Izabel	1	2001	0	—
20	**Internacional**	0	—	2	1985, 2022
20	**Palmeiras**	0	—	2	1999–00, 2021
20	Vitória (PE)	0	—	2	2011, 2013 (CDB)
23	**Atlético Mineiro**	0	—	1	1984
23	Brasilia	0	—	1	1986
23	**Cruzeiro**	0	—	1	2025
23	Euroexport	0	—	1	1994
23	Foz do Iguaçu FC	0	—	1	2010
23	Independente de Tucuruí	0	—	1	1990
23	Matonense	0	—	1	2001
23	Ponto Frio	0	—	1	1983
23	**Sport**	0	—	1	2008
23	Vila Dimas	0	—	1	1987

=== Champions by state ===
State	Championships	Clubs
(São Paulo (state)) São Paulo	24	Corinthians (7), Santos (4), Ferroviária (3), São José (2), São Paulo (2), Audax (1), Botucatu (1), Centro Olímpico (1), Portuguesa (1), Rio Preto (1), Saad (1)
(Rio de Janeiro (state)) Rio de Janeiro	11	Radar (6), Vasco da Gama (3), Duque de Caxias/CEPE (1), Flamengo (1)
(Amazonas (Brazilian state)) Amazonas	1	Sul América (1)
Mato Grosso do Sul	1	MS/Saad (1)
Minas Gerais	1	Santa Izabel (1)
(Paraná (state)) Paraná	1	Foz Cataratas (1)
(Santa Catarina (state)) Santa Catarina	1	Kindermann (1)

=== Notes ===
1. Saad Esporte Clube was moved from São Caetano do Sul, São Paulo, to Campo Grande, Mato Grosso do Sul. In practice, it's the same club.
2. In 2016, SC Corinthians and Grêmio Audax formed a partnership in women's football. Corinthians entered as a sponsor and Grêmio Audax with the players and the registry. In practice, the winner of the 2016 Copa do Brasil is Grêmio Audax.
3. In 25 February 2019, Avaí FC partnered with SE Kindermann, remained as Avaí/Kindermann until 19 June 2023, when Avaí FC full incorporated the SE Kindermann.

== Top Scorers ==
Year	Player (team)	Goals
1983	Alice (Radar)	2
1984	Unknown	
1985	Cenira (Radar)	10
1986	Unknown	
1987	Unknown	
1988	Michael (Radar)	8
1990	Unknown	
1993	Unknown	
1994	Unknown	
1996	Unknown	
1997	Kátia Cilene (São Paulo)	18
1998	Kátia Cilene (São Paulo)	36
1999–00	Kátia Cilene (São Paulo)	19
2001	Duda Luizelli (Internacional)	10
2006	Grazielle (Botucatu)	11
2007 (LINAF)	Unknown	
2007 (CDB)	Daniela Aves (MS/Saad)	14
2008	Luciléia (Kindermann)	8
2009	Marta (Santos)	18
2010	Raquel (Duque de Caxias/CEPE)	9
2011	Thaisinha (Vitória-PE)	10
2012	Thaisinha (Vitória-PE)	7
2013 (CDB)	Giovânia (São José)	8
2013 (BR)	Gabi Zanotti (Centro Olímpico)	12
2014 (CDB)	Nenê (Ferroviária)	9
2014 (BR)	Raquel Fernandes (Ferroviária)	16
2015 (CDB)	Byanca Brasil (Kindermann)	9
2015 (BR)	Gabi Nunes (Centro Olímpico)	14
2016 (CDB)	Chú (Audax/Corinthians)	12
2016 (BR)	Millene (Rio Preto)	10
2017	(Argentina) Sole Jaimes (Santos)	18
2018	Dany Helena (Flamengo)	15
2019	Millene (Corinthians)	19
2020	Carla Nunes (Palmeiras)	12
2021	Bia Zaneratto (Palmeiras)	13
2022	Cristiane (Santos)	13
2023	Amanda Gutierres (Palmeiras)	13
2024	Amanda Gutierres (Palmeiras)	15
2025	Amanda Gutierres (Palmeiras)	17
2026	Marília (Cruzeiro)	11

== Winning managers ==
Year	Manager	Club
1983	Eurico Lyra	Radar
1984	Eurico Lyra (2)	Radar
1985	Eurico Lyra (3)	Radar
1986	Eurico Lyra (4)	Radar
1987	Eurico Lyra (5)	Radar
1988	Eurico Lyra (6)	Radar
1990	Rosangela	Sul América
1993	Helena Pacheco	Vasco da Gama
1994	Helena Pacheco (2)	Vasco da Gama
1996	Ademar Fonseca	Saad
1997	José Duarte	São Paulo
1998	Helena Pacheco (3)	Vasco da Gama
1999–00	Wilsinho	Portuguesa
2001	Beto	Santa Izabel
2006	Edson Castro	Botucatu
2007 (LINAF)	Kleiton Lima	Santos
2007 (CDB)	José Roberto da Silva	MS/Saad
2008	Kleiton Lima (2)	Santos
2009	Kleiton Lima (3)	Santos
2010	Edson Galdino	Duque de Caxias/CEPE
2011	Gezi Gonçalves	Foz Cataratas
2012	Márcio Oliveira	São José
2013 (CDB)	Márcio Oliveira (2)	São José
2013 (BR)	Arthur Elias	Centro Olímpico
2014 (CDB)	Douglas Onça	Ferroviária
2014 (BR)	Douglas Onça (2)	Ferroviária
2015 (CDB)	Josué Kaercher	Kindermann
2015 (BR)	Chicão Reguera	Rio Preto
2016 (CDB)	Arthur Elias (2)	Audax/Corinthians
2016 (BR)	Ricardo Abrantes	Flamengo
2017	Caio Couto	Santos
2018	Arthur Elias (3)	Corinthians
2019	Tatiele Silveira	Ferroviária
2020	Arthur Elias (4)	Corinthians
2021	Arthur Elias (5)	Corinthians
2022	Arthur Elias (6)	Corinthians
2023	Arthur Elias (7)	Corinthians
2024	Lucas Piccinato	Corinthians
2025	Lucas Piccinato (2)	Corinthians
2026	Thiago Viana	São Paulo

== See also ==
- List of Brazilian football champions
