= Julia Bianchi =

Brazilian footballer (born 1997)

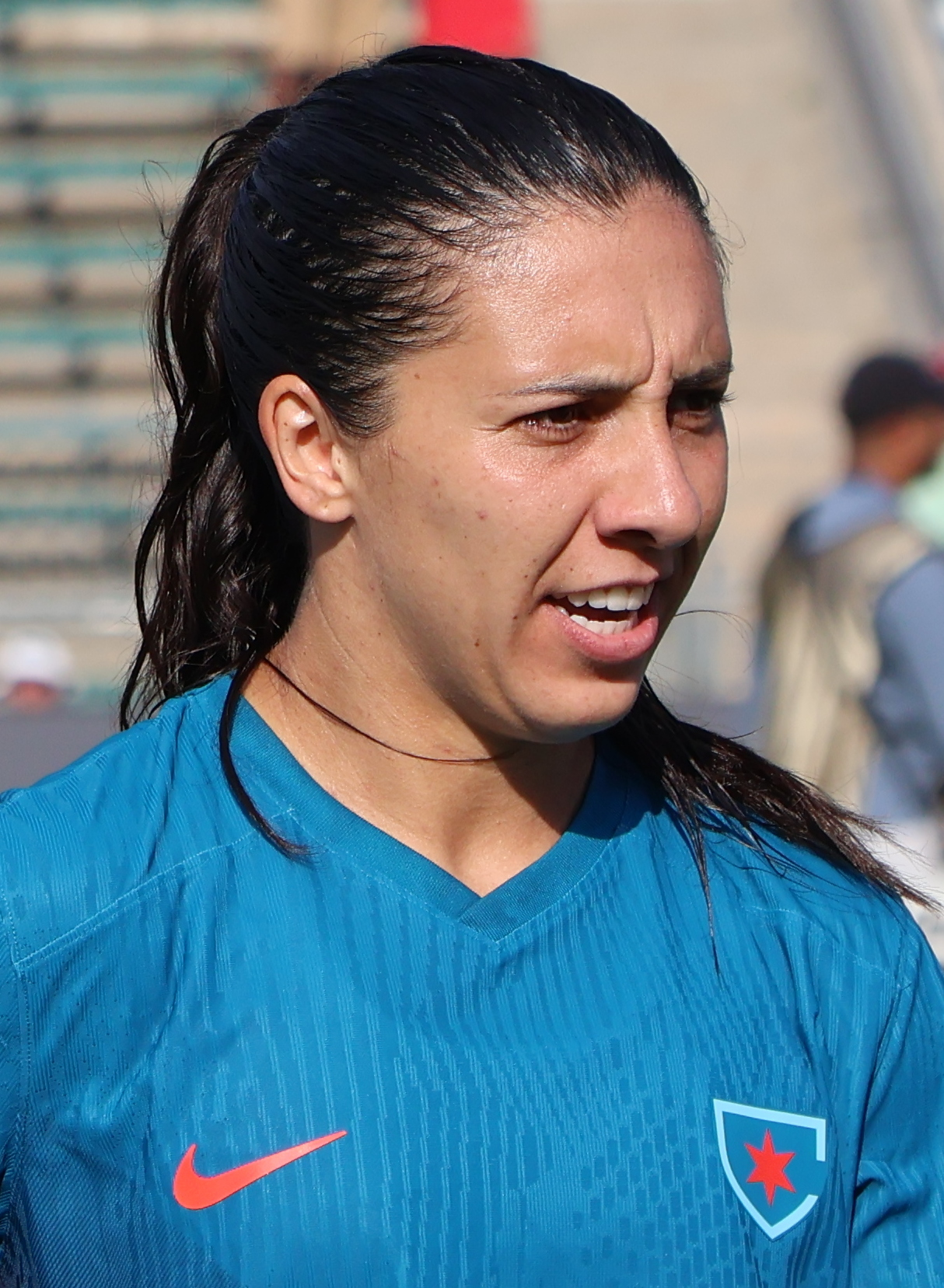
- Bianchi with the Chicago Red Stars in 2024

Personal information
- Full name: Julia Bianchi
- Date of birth: 7 October 1997 (age 29)
- Place of birth: Xanxerê, Santa Catarina, Brazil
- Height: 1.67 m (5 ft 6 in)
- Position: Defensive midfielder

Team information
- Current team: SC Internacional

Youth career
- Kindermann

Senior career*
Years	Team	Apps	(Gls)
2013	Kindermann	0	(0)
2014	Centro Olímpico	3	(0)
2015–2016	Ferroviária	16	(0)
2017–2020	Kindermann	61	(10)
2017–2019	→ Madrid CFF (loan)	17	(0)
2021–2022	Palmeiras	37	(2)
2023–2024	Chicago Red Stars	37	(1)
2025–	SC Internacional	0	(0)

International career
2012	Brazil U17	4	(0)
2014–2016	Brazil U20	7	(0)
2020–	Brazil	12	(2)
- * Club domestic league appearances and goals as of 6 March 2025

Julia Bianchi (born 7 October 1997) is a Brazilian professional footballer who plays as a defensive midfielder for SC Internacional of the Campeonato Brasileiro de Futebol Feminino Série A1 and the Brazil women's national team.

== Club career ==
Bianchi was born Xanxerê, a small town in Santa Catarina in the southern Brazil. She started her professional career at Kindermann, a traditional women's football club based in Caçador, Santa Catarina. Then, she went to play for Centro Olímpico and then signed with Ferroviária. In 2017, Bianchi returned to Kindermann and, in the following year, she was loaned to Madrid CFF in the Primera División. Back with Kindermann, she was chosen one of the best players in the 2020 season of the Campeonato Brasileiro. As a result, in the following year, she signed with Palmeiras.

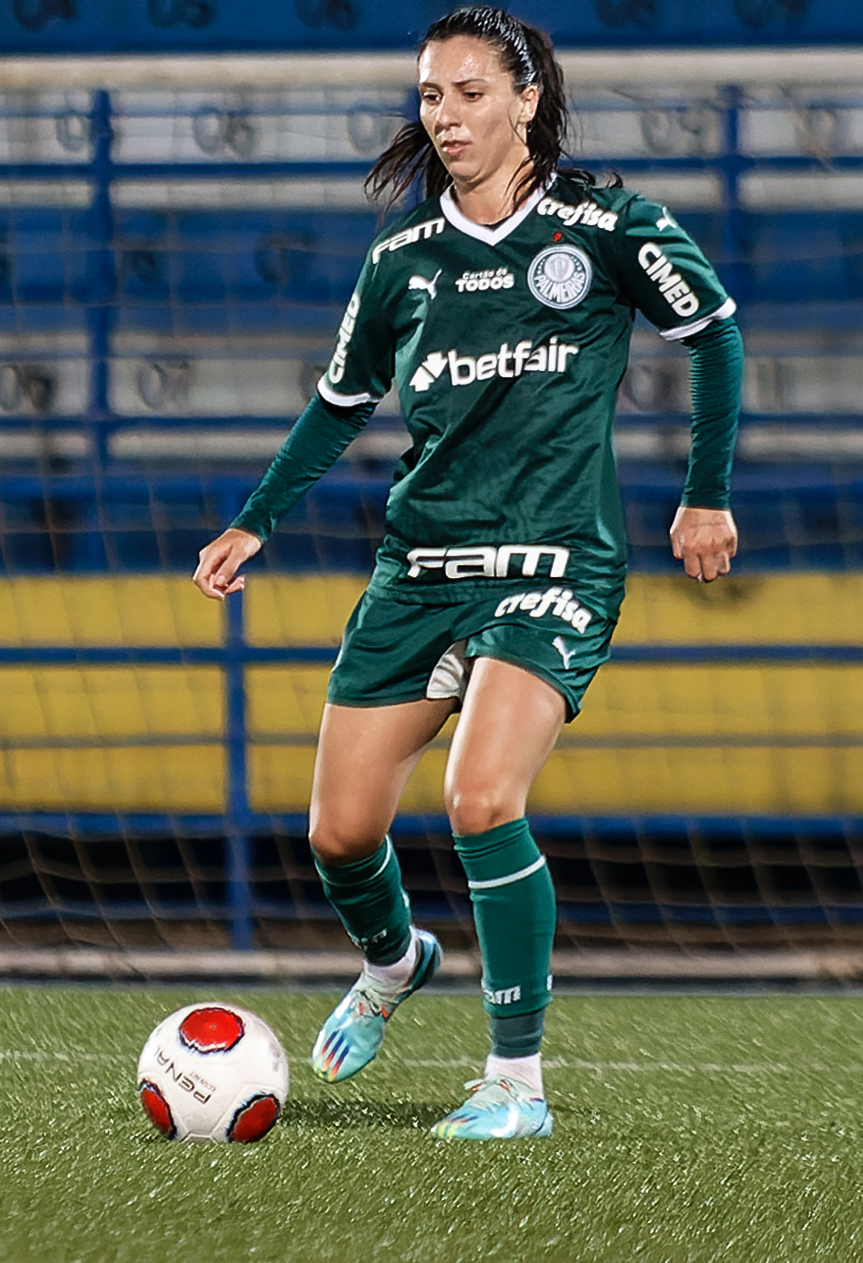
Bianchi playing for Palmeiras in 2022

She signed with Chicago Red Stars on 25 January 2023. After spending two seasons in Chicago, she signed for SC Internacional in January 2025.

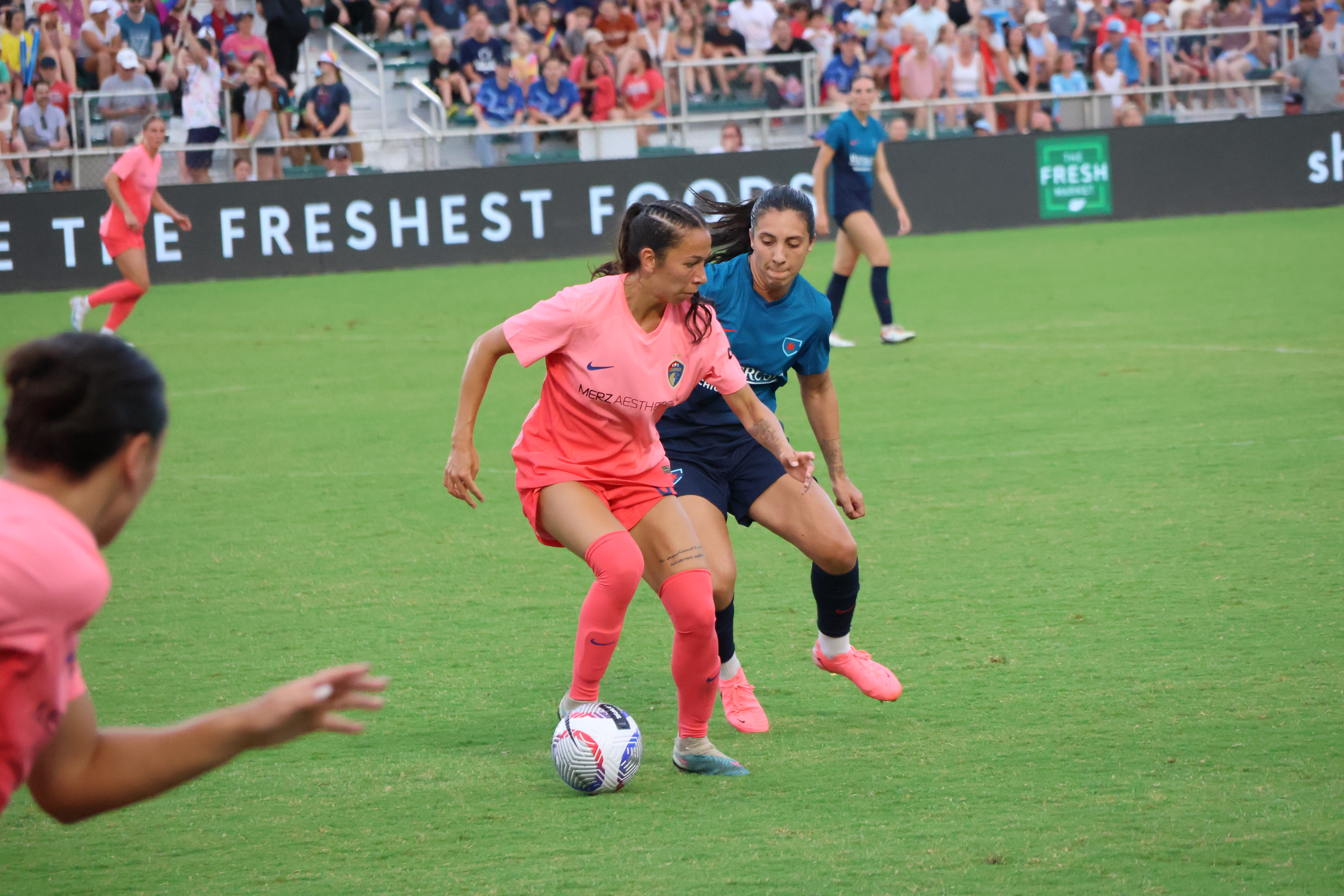
Bianchi playing for the Chicago Red Stars in 2024

== International career ==
Bianchi was called to represent the Brazil U17 at the 2012 FIFA U-17 Women's World Cup, where she featured, as a right-back, in all the four matches Brazil played in the tournament. At the time, she was only 14 years old. Bianchi also represented Brazil U20 in two FIFA U-20 Women's World Cups, in 2014 and in 2016. On both occasions, she featured in all the matches her team played in these tournaments, playing as a defensive midfielder, as a right-back, and as a centre-back.

On 9 November, after having a great season in 2020 where Bianchi was chosen one of the best midfielders in the Campeonato Brasileiro, Bianchi was called to represent Brazil in two friendly matches against Argentina. Later, Argentina quit the matches with Ecuador taking its place. On 1 December, she debuted for Brazil coming in the half-time of the 8–0 win over Ecuador. On 28 January 2021, Bianchi was called by Pia Sundhage to represent Brazil at the 2021 SheBelieves Cup. She featured in all three matches played by her team in the tournament. Later in the same year, Bianchi was called and played in other two friendly matches for Brazil. On 11 June against Russia and on 14 June against Canada.

On 18 June 2021, Bianchi was included, by Sundhage, in the squad who represented Brazil at 2020 Summer Olympics.

== International goals ==
Goal	Date	Location	Opponent	Score	Result	Competition
1	2020-12-01	São Paulo, Brasil	Ecuador	7–0	8–0	Friendly game
2	2021-02-24	Orlando, United States	Canada	2–0	2–0	2021 SheBelieves Cup
