= Yanne (footballer) =

Brazilian footballer (born 2003)

Personal information
- Full name: Yanne Camille Lopes Fonseca
- Date of birth: 7 January 2003 (age 23)
- Place of birth: Conceição do Coité, Brazil
- Height: 1.73 m (5 ft 8 in)
- Position: Goalkeeper

Team information
- Current team: Bahia
- Number: 12

Youth career
- 2019–2020: Vitória
- 2020: → Ferroviária (loan)
- 2021–2023: Ferroviária

Senior career*
Years	Team	Apps	(Gls)
2020	Vitória	8	(0)
2022–2023	Ferroviária	1	(0)
2024–	Bahia	55	(0)

International career
2022	Brazil U20	1	(0)
- * Club domestic league appearances and goals as of 21:19, 4 October 2026 (UTC)

Yanne Camille Lopes Fonseca (born 7 January 2003), simply known as Yanne, is a Brazilian footballer who plays as a goalkeeper for Bahia.

== Club career ==
Born in Conceição do Coité, Bahia, Yanne began her career with Vitória and made her first team debut in 2020. She moved to Ferroviária on loan shortly after, before signing a permanent deal in 2021.

Yanne was mainly used in the under-18 and under-20 squads of the Guerreiras Grenás, featuring in just one first team match in 2022. In February 2024, she was presented at Bahia, where she quickly established herself as a regular starter.

In April 2025, Yanne renewed her link with Bahia until 2027.

== International career ==
In September 2021, Yanne was called up to the Brazil women's national under-20 team, and was also a part of the squad which won the 2022 South American Under-20 Women's Football Championship, despite being a backup option. In September 2026, she received a call-up to the full side for two friendlies against Argentina.

== Honours ==
Bahia

- Campeonato Baiano de Futebol Feminino: 2024, 2025

Brazil U20

- South American Under-20 Women's Football Championship: 2022
