= Euroexport =

Former Brazilian women's football club

Euroexport was a Brazilian professional women's football and futsal club based in Salvador in Bahia. Founded by Dilma Mendes in 1993, the club competed at state and national level in both sports.

The Euroexport company who named and sponsored the team paid players in United States dollars and also ran a team of the same name in São Paulo. In 1994 the Bahia Euroexport won the Taça Brasil de Futsal Feminino (pt), with São Paulo Euroexport as runners-up. Also in 1994 Euroexport (Bahia) were runners-up to Vasco da Gama in the 11-a-side Campeonato Brasileiro.

Euroexport provided seven players to Brazil's squad for the 1995 South American Women's Football Championship in Uberlândia.

== Honours ==
- Campeonato Baiano
  - Winners (3): 1993, 1994, 1995
