= Bel (footballer) =

Brazilian footballer (born 1966)

Personal information
- Full name: Isabel Cristina de Araújo Nunes
- Date of birth: 12 May 1966 (age 60)
- Place of birth: Porto Alegre, Brazil
- Height: 1.68 m (5 ft 6 in)
- Positions: Winger; forward

Senior career*
Years	Team	Apps	(Gls)
- Pepsi Bola
- Sport Club Internacional
1994	Torino		
- Grêmio

International career^{‡}
- Brazil
- * Club domestic league appearances and goals as of 11:51, 28 March 2018 (UTC) ‡ National team caps and goals as of 11:51, 28 March 2018 (UTC)

Isabel Cristina de Araújo Nunes (born 12 May 1966), commonly known as Bel, is a Brazilian former footballer who played as a winger or forward for the Brazil women's national football team.

== Club career ==
While playing for Inter, Bel came to notice for her physical attractiveness and was declared the most beautiful player at the 1985 Brazilian Cup. She was described as "an icon of sensual femininity in football". She was also a skilful attacker, often likened to the male player Renato Portaluppi who was also from Porto Alegre and wore the number 7 shirt. Bel was pictured on the cover of Placar on four separate occasions.

In 1987 Inter abolished their women's team and Bel played futsal for local teams called Bruxas and Chimarrão. In 1994 she transferred to Torino of the Italian Serie A, where she was provided with a car and lodged with Antonella Carta. She returned to Brazil for personal reasons after only three months, when an affair with the club president Roberto Goveani "got complicated". Her final season of club football was in 2001 with Grêmio.

== International career ==
Bel was named as part of Brazil's squad for the 1995 South American Women's Football Championship in Uberlândia. She scored in the team's 15–0 win over Bolivia. With the national team she was a reserve to Roseli de Belo and Pretinha.

Following a dispute with the team's chief of delegation Rosilene Gomes, Bel was not selected for the 1995 FIFA Women's World Cup in Sweden.

== Personal life ==
A year after retiring from football, Bel gave birth to her son Luiz Felipe. She was treated for breast cancer in 2017, while working as a physical education teacher in Florianópolis. In July 1995 Bel posed nude for Playboy (Brazil). The publication had originally approached her when she was 17 years old, but at that stage she rejected the offer to appear nude and wore a bikini.
