= Russa (footballer) =

Brazilian footballer

Personal information
- Full name: Márcia Matos Calaça
- Date of birth: 12 February 1963 (age 63)
- Place of birth: Brazil
- Position: Midfielder

Senior career*
Years	Team	Apps	(Gls)
- Radar
- Vasco da Gama

International career
1988–1996	Brazil	10+	(3)
- * Club domestic league appearances and goals

Márcia Matos Calaça (born 12 February 1963), commonly known as Russa, is a Brazilian former footballer who played as a midfielder for the Brazil women's national team.

== Career ==
In her club career, Russa played for Radar and the women's team of Vasco da Gama. She was a member of the Brazil national team, and was included in the country's squad for the 1988 FIFA Women's Invitation Tournament, in which Brazil finished third. She was also included in the team's squad for the 1995 South American Women's Football Championship, during which she scored a hat-trick against Ecuador. Brazil went on to win the tournament, thus qualifying for the 1995 FIFA Women's World Cup in Sweden. The following year, she was included as an alternate player for the football tournament at the 1996 Summer Olympics in Atlanta, in which Brazil finished fourth. Between 1988 and 1996, Russa made at least ten appearances and scored three goals for the Brazil national team.
