= Duda Luizelli =

Brazilian women footballer

Personal information
- Full name: Eduarda Marranghello Luizelli
- Date of birth: 25 August 1971 (age 55)
- Place of birth: Porto Alegre, Brazil
- Position: Midfielder

Senior career*
Years	Team	Apps	(Gls)
1983–1993	Internacional		
1993–1994	ACF Milan		
1994–1995	Verona Gunther		
1996	Saad		

International career
1995–1996	Brazil	4	(1)
- * Club domestic league appearances and goals as of 4 July 2025

Eduarda Marranghello Luizelli (born 25 August 1971), better known as Duda Luizelli, is a Brazilian former professional women's footballer who played as a midfielder.

== Club career ==
Luizelli began her career as a player at the age of 12, a time when there was no youth category and women's football had been allowed again in Brazil. She was part of Internacional's first five state titles, and later played in Italian football for Milan and Verona.

== International career ==
Duda played for the Brazil national team in 1995 and 1996, being part of the squad that won the South American championship.

== Post career ==
After retiring as a player, Luizelli continued to work with women's football in Rio Grande do Sul state. She claims to have been directly involved in more than 20 state championships as an athlete or manager. She also worked as a coordinator for the youth teams at the CBF.

She is also affiliated with the political party Cidadania, through which ran for the state congress of Rio Grande do Sul in 2022.

== Honours ==
Internacional

- Campeonato Gaúcho Feminino: 1983, 1984, 1985, 1986, 1987

Brazil

- Copa América Femenina: 1995
