= 2020 Campeonato Brasileiro de Futebol Feminino Série A1 =

Campeonato Brasileiro de Futebol Feminino Série A1
- Season: 2020
- Dates: 8 February – 6 December 2020
- Champions: Corinthians (2nd title)
- Relegated: Audax; Iranduba; Ponte Preta; Vitória
- Copa Libertadores: Corinthians; Kindermann/Avaí
- Matches played: 134
- Goals scored: 428 (3.19 per match)
- Best Player: Gabi Zanotti
- Top goalscorer: Carla Nunes (12 goals)
- Biggest home win: Kindermann/Avaí 9–0 Audax; Group stage, R8, 10 September; Internacional 9–0 Audax; Group stage, R14, 11 October
- Biggest away win: Ponte Preta 0–7 Corinthians; Group stage, R14, 11 October
- Highest scoring: 9 goals Kindermann/Avaí 9–0 Audax; Group stage, R8, 10 September; Internacional 9–0 Audax; Group stage, R14, 11 October

The 2020 Campeonato Brasileiro Feminino A-1 was the 8th season of the Campeonato Brasileiro de Futebol Feminino Série A1, the top level of women's football in Brazil, and the 4th edition in a Série A1 since its establishment in 2016. The tournament was organized by the Brazilian Football Confederation (CBF).

The competition began on 8 February and was originally scheduled to end on 13 September, however due to the COVID-19 pandemic the tournament was suspended by CBF on 15 March. After several months, the tournament was resumed on 26 August and the end was rescheduled to 6 December.

In the finals, Corinthians won their second title after defeating Kindermann/Avaí 4–2 on aggregate. As champions and runners-up, Corinthians and Kindermann/Avaí qualified for the Copa Libertadores Femenina, while the bottom four teams in the group stage, Audax, Iranduba, Ponte Preta, and Vitória, were relegated to Campeonato Brasileiro de Futebol Feminino Série A2. Ferroviária were the defending champions, but they were eliminated in the quarter-finals.

== Format ==
In the group stage, each team played once against the other fifteen teams. Top eight teams qualified for the final stages. Quarter-finals, semi-finals and finals were played on a home-and-away two-legged basis.

== Teams ==
Location of teams in 2020 Série A1 outside the state of São Paulo (in red).
Location of teams in 2020 Série A1 within the state of São Paulo.

Sixteen teams competed in the league – the top twelve teams from the previous season, as well as four teams promoted from the 2019 Série A2.

Pos.	Relegated from 2019 Série A1
13	Vitória das Tabocas/Santa Cruz
14	Foz Cataratas/Athletico Paranaense
15	São Francisco
16	Sport/Ipojuca

Pos.	Promoted from 2019 Série A2
1	São Paulo
2	Cruzeiro
3	Palmeiras
4	Grêmio

=== Number of teams by state ===
Number of teams	State	Team(s)
8	São Paulo	Audax, Corinthians, Ferroviária, Palmeiras, Ponte Preta, Santos, São José and São Paulo
2	Rio Grande do Sul	Grêmio and Internacional
1	Amazonas	Iranduba
1	Bahia	Vitória
1	Distrito Federal	Minas/ICESP
1	Minas Gerais	Cruzeiro
1	Rio de Janeiro	Flamengo/Marinha
1	Santa Catarina	Kindermann/Avaí

=== Stadiums and locations ===
Team	Location	Stadium	Capacity
(São Paulo (state)) Audax^{[a]}	Osasco	José Liberatti	12,430
(São Paulo (state)) Corinthians	São Paulo	Parque São Jorge	18,500
(São Paulo (state)) Corinthians	São Paulo	Neo Química Arena	47,605
(Minas Gerais) Cruzeiro	Belo Horizonte	SESC Alterosas	2,000
(Minas Gerais) Cruzeiro	Belo Horizonte	Mineirão	75,783
(São Paulo (state)) Ferroviária	Araraquara	Fonte Luminosa	21,441
(Rio de Janeiro (state)) Flamengo/Marinha	Rio de Janeiro	Estádio da Gávea	4,000
(Rio de Janeiro (state)) Flamengo/Marinha	Rio de Janeiro	Giulite Coutinho (Mesquita)	13,544
(Rio Grande do Sul) Grêmio^{[b]}	Porto Alegre	Francisco Novelletto Neto	14,000
(Rio Grande do Sul) Grêmio^{[b]}	Porto Alegre	Arena do Grêmio	55,662
(Rio Grande do Sul) Grêmio^{[b]}	Porto Alegre	Antônio Vieira Ramos (Gravataí)	4,700
(Rio Grande do Sul) Internacional	Porto Alegre	SESC Campestre	2,800
(Rio Grande do Sul) Internacional	Porto Alegre	Beira-Rio	50,128
(Rio Grande do Sul) Internacional	Porto Alegre	Estádio do Vale (Novo Hamburgo)	5,196
(Amazonas (Brazilian state)) Iranduba^{[c]}	Iranduba	Arena da Amazônia (Manaus)	44,000
(Amazonas (Brazilian state)) Iranduba^{[c]}	Iranduba	Ismael Benigno (Manaus)	10,451
(Santa Catarina (state)) Kindermann/Avaí	Caçador	Carlos Alberto da Costa Neves	6,500
(Santa Catarina (state)) Kindermann/Avaí	Florianópolis	Estádio da Ressacada	17,826
(Federal District (Brazil)) Minas/ICESP	Brasília	Bezerrão (Gama)	20,310
(São Paulo (state)) Palmeiras^{[d]}	São Paulo	Allianz Parque	43,713
(São Paulo (state)) Palmeiras^{[d]}	São Paulo	Nelo Bracalente (Vinhedo)	4,200
(São Paulo (state)) Ponte Preta	Campinas	Moisés Lucarelli	19,728
(São Paulo (state)) Santos	Santos	Urbano Caldeira	21,732
(São Paulo (state)) Santos	Santos	Ulrico Mursa	8,392
(São Paulo (state)) Santos	Santos	Arena Barueri (Barueri)	31,452
(São Paulo (state)) São José	São José dos Campos	Martins Pereira	16,500
(São Paulo (state)) São Paulo^{[e]}	São Paulo	Marcelo Portugal Gouvêa (Cotia)	2,000
(São Paulo (state)) São Paulo^{[e]}	São Paulo	Estádio do Morumbi	77,011
(Bahia) Vitória	Salvador	Barradão	35,000

^{a} Audax also played a home match at Arena Barueri (Barueri).
^{b} Grêmio also played home matches at Estádio do Vale (Novo Hamburgo) and CT Presidente Hélio Dourado (Eldorado do Sul).
^{c} Iranduba also played a home match at Estádio Carlos Zamith (Manaus).
^{d} Palmeiras also played a home match at Estádio Novelli Júnior (Itu).
^{e} São Paulo also played a home match at Arena Barueri (Barueri).

== Group stage ==
In the group stage, each team played on a single round-robin tournament. The top eight teams advanced to the quarter-finals of the knockout stages. The teams were ranked according to points (3 points for a win, 1 point for a draw, and 0 points for a loss). If tied on points, the following criteria would be used to determine the ranking: 1. Wins; 2. Goal difference; 3. Goals scored; 4. Fewest red cards; 5. Fewest yellow cards; 6. Draw in the headquarters of the Brazilian Football Confederation (Regulations Article 12).

=== Group A ===
Pos	Team	Pld	W	D	L	GF	GA	GD	Pts	Qualification or relegation
1	Corinthians	15	14	0	1	45	7	+38	42	Advance to Quarter-finals
2	Santos	15	11	0	4	35	10	+25	33	Advance to Quarter-finals
3	Internacional	15	10	3	2	39	14	+25	33	Advance to Quarter-finals
4	Ferroviária	15	9	2	4	34	13	+21	29	Advance to Quarter-finals
5	Palmeiras	15	8	4	3	32	19	+13	28	Advance to Quarter-finals
6	Kindermann/Avaí	15	8	3	4	39	12	+27	27	Advance to Quarter-finals
7	São Paulo	15	8	3	4	33	11	+22	27	Advance to Quarter-finals
8	Grêmio	15	7	3	5	17	12	+5	24	Advance to Quarter-finals
9	Flamengo/Marinha	15	7	3	5	23	21	+2	24	
10	Cruzeiro	15	7	2	6	24	20	+4	23	
11	São José	15	6	2	7	24	23	+1	20	
12	Minas/ICESP	15	4	2	9	21	30	−9	14	
13	Iranduba	15	3	2	10	16	28	−12	11	Relegation to Campeonato Brasileiro Série A2
14	Audax	15	2	1	12	4	57	−53	7	Relegation to Campeonato Brasileiro Série A2
15	Ponte Preta	15	1	0	14	7	62	−55	3	Relegation to Campeonato Brasileiro Série A2
16	Vitória	15	0	0	15	2	56	−54	0	Relegation to Campeonato Brasileiro Série A2

Source: CBF

=== Results ===
Home \ Away	AUD	COR	CRU	FER	FLA	GRE	INT	IRA	KIN	MIN	PAL	PON	SAN	SJO	SPO	VIT
Audax			0–6			0–3		1–2		0–0	0–4	1–0		0–3		2–1
Corinthians	3–0		4–1	2–0		1–0			2–1				1–0	3–0		6–0
Cruzeiro				0–1		1–2				2–0	0–5	1–0			1–0	4–0
Ferroviária	4–0					0–1	1–2	1–1	2–0			7–1			2–1	7–0
Flamengo/Marinha	4–0	1–3	1–1	1–1		2–0			2–1			3–0			1–3	
Grêmio							0–1	3–1		2–1	0–0		0–2	1–1		2–0
Internacional	9–0	0–4	4–1		1–1			2–0	0–0				0–2	2–0		
Iranduba		0–2	0–2		1–3					0–2	2–2		0–3	1–3		
Kindermann/Avaí	9–0		1–1			1–0		3–0		6–1			2–1		1–1	7–0
Minas/ICESP		1–4		1–2	2–3		1–4				1–1	7–0		3–2		
Palmeiras		1–3		1–4	1–0		1–3		2–1				2–1		2–1	
Ponte Preta		0–7				1–3	1–6	0–5	0–3		1–4			0–1		
Santos	5–0		2–0	1–2	4–0					2–0		6–0			2–1	1–0
São José			0–3	1–0	3–0				0–3		2–2		2–3		0–2	6–0
São Paulo	4–0	2–0				0–0	2–2	1–0		2–0		7–0				
Vitória					0–1		0–3	0–3		0–1	0–4	1–3			0–6	

Source: CBF
Legend: Blue = home team win; Yellow = draw; Red = away team win.

== Final stages ==
Starting from the quarter-finals, the teams played a single-elimination tournament with the following rules:

- Quarter-finals, semi-finals and finals were played on a home-and-away two-legged basis, with the higher-seeded team hosting the second leg.
  - If tied on aggregate, the penalty shoot-out would be used to determine the winner (Regulations Article 13).
- Extra time would not be played and away goals rule would not be used in final stages.

Starting from the semi-finals, the teams were seeded according to their performance in the tournament. The teams were ranked according to overall points. If tied on overall points, the following criteria would be used to determine the ranking: 1. Overall wins; 2. Overall goal difference; 3. Draw in the headquarters of the Brazilian Football Confederation (Regulations Article 17).

=== Bracket ===
Quarter-finals
(São Paulo (state)) São Paulo	0	2	2
(São Paulo (state)) Santos	0	0	0
(Santa Catarina (state)) Kindermann/Avaí	3	1	4
(Rio Grande do Sul) Internacional	2	1	3
(São Paulo (state)) Palmeiras (p)	2	0	2 (4)
(São Paulo (state)) Ferroviária	1	1	2 (2)
(Rio Grande do Sul) Grêmio	0	1	1
(São Paulo (state)) Corinthians	3	2	5

Semi-finals
(São Paulo (state)) São Paulo	1	1	2
(Santa Catarina (state)) Kindermann/Avaí	3	0	3
(São Paulo (state)) Palmeiras	0	0	0
(São Paulo (state)) Corinthians	0	3	3

Finals
(Santa Catarina (state)) Kindermann/Avaí	0	2	2
(São Paulo (state)) Corinthians	0	4	4

=== Quarter-finals ===
Team 1	Agg.	Team 2	1st leg	2nd leg
Grêmio (Rio Grande do Sul)	1–5	(São Paulo (state)) Corinthians	0–3	1–2
São Paulo (São Paulo (state))	2–0	(São Paulo (state)) Santos	0–0	2–0
Kindermann/Avaí (Santa Catarina (state))	4–3	(Rio Grande do Sul) Internacional	3–2	1–1
Palmeiras (São Paulo (state))	2–2 (4–2 p)	(São Paulo (state)) Ferroviária	2–1	0–1

==== Group B ====
25 October 2020
16:00

Grêmio (Rio Grande do Sul)	0–3	(São Paulo (state)) Corinthians
	Report	Giovanna Crivelari 20', 49'; Ana Alice 48' (o.g.)

Arena do Grêmio, Porto Alegre
Attendance: 0
Referee: Diego da Costa Cidral (Santa Catarina)

2 November 2020
19:00

Corinthians (São Paulo (state))	2–1	(Rio Grande do Sul) Grêmio
Gabi Zanotti 31'; Tamires 45'	Report	Eudimilla 37'

Neo Química Arena, São Paulo
Attendance: 0
Referee: Márcio Henrique de Góis (São Paulo)

Corinthians won 5–1 on aggregate and advanced to the semi-finals.

==== Group C ====
28 October 2020
19:30

São Paulo (São Paulo (state))	0–0	(São Paulo (state)) Santos
	Report

Estádio do Morumbi, São Paulo
Attendance: 0
Referee: Thiago Luís Scarascati (São Paulo)

1 November 2020
16:00

Santos (São Paulo (state))	0–2	(São Paulo (state)) São Paulo
	Report	Jaqueline Ribeiro 18'; Thaís Regina 90+3' (pen.)

Arena Barueri, Barueri
Attendance: 0
Referee: Vinícius Furlan (São Paulo)

São Paulo won 2–0 on aggregate and advanced to the semi-finals.

==== Group D ====
28 October 2020
17:00

Kindermann/Avaí (Santa Catarina (state))	3–2	(Rio Grande do Sul) Internacional
Lelê 39'; Siméia 43'; Camila 55'	Report	Ju Ferreira 29'; Byanca Brasil 80'

Estádio da Ressacada, Florianópolis
Attendance: 35
Referee: Charly Wendy Straub Deretti (Santa Catarina)

1 November 2020
16:00

Internacional (Rio Grande do Sul)	1–1	(Santa Catarina (state)) Kindermann/Avaí
Jheniffer 51'	Report	Siméia 80'

Estádio Beira-Rio, Porto Alegre
Attendance: 0
Referee: Douglas Schwengber da Silva (Rio Grande do Sul)

Kindermann/Avaí won 4–3 on aggregate and advanced to the semi-finals.

==== Group E ====
28 October 2020
19:30

Palmeiras (São Paulo (state))	2–1	(São Paulo (state)) Ferroviária
Thaís Ferreira 5'; Camilinha 57'	Report	Patrícia Sochor 81'

Allianz Parque, São Paulo
Attendance: 0
Referee: José Cláudio Rocha Filho (São Paulo)

1 November 2020
19:30

Ferroviária (São Paulo (state))	1–0	(São Paulo (state)) Palmeiras
Aline Milene 36' (pen.)	Report
Penalties
Luana Sartório (penalty missed); Aline Milene (penalty scored); Ludmila Barbosa (penalty scored); Nenê (penalty missed)	2–4	(penalty scored) Bianca; (penalty missed) Barroso; (penalty scored) Thaís Ferreira; (penalty scored) Karla Alves; (penalty scored) Camilinha

Estádio Fonte Luminosa, Araraquara
Attendance: 0
Referee: Leandro Bizzio Marinho (São Paulo)

Tied 2–2 on aggregate, Palmeiras won on penalties and advanced to the semi-finals.

=== Semi-finals ===
Pos	Team	Pld	W	D	L	GF	GA	GD	Pts	Host
1	(São Paulo (state)) Corinthians	17	16	0	1	50	8	+42	48	Second leg
4	(São Paulo (state)) Palmeiras	17	9	4	4	34	21	+13	31	First leg
2	(Santa Catarina (state)) Kindermann/Avaí	17	9	4	4	43	15	+28	31	Second leg
3	(São Paulo (state)) São Paulo	17	9	4	4	35	11	+24	31	First leg

Source: CBF

Team 1	Agg.	Team 2	1st leg	2nd leg
Palmeiras (São Paulo (state))	0–3	(São Paulo (state)) Corinthians	0–0	0–3
São Paulo (São Paulo (state))	2–3	(Santa Catarina (state)) Kindermann/Avaí	1–3	1–0

==== Group F ====
8 November 2020
20:00

Palmeiras (São Paulo (state))	0–0	(São Paulo (state)) Corinthians
	Report

Allianz Parque, São Paulo
Attendance: 0
Referee: Felipe Fernandes de Lima (Minas Gerais)

Craque da partida: Érika (Corinthians)

16 November 2020
19:00

Corinthians (São Paulo (state))	3–0	(São Paulo (state)) Palmeiras
Poliana 21'; Ingryd 90+1'; Diany 90+3'	Report

Neo Química Arena, São Paulo
Attendance: 0
Referee: Vinícius Furlan (São Paulo)

Craque da partida: Andressinha (Corinthians)

Corinthians won 3–0 on aggregate and advanced to the finals.

==== Group G ====
8 November 2020
18:00

São Paulo (São Paulo (state))	1–3	(Santa Catarina (state)) Kindermann/Avaí
Kamilla Sotero 90+2'	Report	Duda Santos 16'; Julia Bianchi 31', 62'

Arena Barueri, Barueri
Attendance: 0
Referee: Graziani Maciel Rocha (Rio de Janeiro)

Craque da partida: Julia Bianchi (Kindermann/Avaí)

14 November 2020
14:00

Kindermann/Avaí (Santa Catarina (state))	0–1	(São Paulo (state)) São Paulo
	Report	Duda 41'

Estádio da Ressacada, Florianópolis
Attendance: 34
Referee: Paulo Roberto Alves Júnior (Paraná)

Craque da partida: Julia Bianchi (Kindermann/Avaí)

Kindermann/Avaí won 3–2 on aggregate and advanced to the finals.

=== Finals ===
Pos	Team	Pld	W	D	L	GF	GA	GD	Pts	Host
1	(São Paulo (state)) Corinthians	19	17	1	1	53	8	+45	52	2nd leg
2	(Santa Catarina (state)) Kindermann/Avaí	19	10	4	5	46	17	+29	34	1st leg

Source: CBF

Team 1	Agg.	Team 2	1st leg	2nd leg
Kindermann/Avaí (Santa Catarina (state))	2–4	(São Paulo (state)) Corinthians	0–0	2–4

==== Group H ====
22 November 2020
20:00

Kindermann/Avaí (Santa Catarina (state))	0–0	(São Paulo (state)) Corinthians
	Report

Estádio da Ressacada, Florianópolis
Attendance: 45
Referee: Rodolpho Toski Marques (Paraná)

Craque da partida: Adriana (Corinthians)

6 December 2020
20:00

Corinthians (São Paulo (state))	4–2	(Santa Catarina (state)) Kindermann/Avaí
Gabi Nunes 28'; Gabi Zanotti 32', 57'; Victória 81'	Report	Zóio 51'; Lelê 78'

Neo Química Arena, São Paulo
Attendance: 0
Referee: Wilton Sampaio (Goiás)

Craque da partida: Gabi Zanotti (Corinthians)

== Top goalscorers ==
Rank	Player	Club	Goals
1	Carla Nunes	Palmeiras	12
2	Lelê	Kindermann/Avaí	11
3	Byanca Brasil	Internacional	10
4	Caty	Kindermann/Avaí	9
4	Jheniffer	Internacional	9
4	Patrícia Sochor	Ferroviária	9
7	Gláucia	São Paulo	8
8	Giovanna Crivelari	Corinthians	7
8	Ketlen	Santos	7
8	Laryh	Santos	7
8	Mylena Carioca	São José	7

Source:CBF

== Awards ==
=== Individual awards ===
The following players were rewarded for their performances during the competition.

- Best player: Gabi Zanotti (Corinthians)
- Breakthrough player: Jaqueline Ribeiro (São Paulo)
- Topscorer: Carla Nunes (Palmeiras)
- Best goal of the tournament: Ingryd (Corinthians, playing against Palmeiras (Semi-finals second leg))
- Best player (Internet-based poll): Kaká (Flamengo/Marinha)

=== Best XI ===
The best XI team was a squad consisting of the eleven most impressive players at the tournament.

Pos.	Player	Team
GK	(Brazil) Lelê	Corinthians
DF	(Brazil) Bruna Calderan	Kindermann/Avaí
DF	(Brazil) Érika	Corinthians
DF	(Argentina) Agustina Barroso	Palmeiras
DF	(Brazil) Tamires	Corinthians
MF	(Brazil) Andressinha	Corinthians
MF	(Brazil) Julia Bianchi	Kindermann/Avaí
MF	(Brazil) Gabi Zanotti	Corinthians
MF	(Brazil) Duda Santos	Kindermann/Avaí
FW	(Brazil) Carla Nunes	Palmeiras
FW	(Brazil) Lelê	Kindermann/Avaí
Head coach	(Brazil) Arthur Elias	Corinthians

Head coach
(Brazil) Arthur Elias
