= Wilsinho (footballer, born 1950) =

Brazilian football manager

Personal information
- Full name: Wilson de Oliveira Riça
- Date of birth: 13 March 1950 (age 76)
- Place of birth: São Paulo, Brazil
- Position: Winger

Senior career*
Years	Team	Apps	(Gls)
1967–1976	Portuguesa	249	(32)
1977–1978	Juventus-SP		
1979–1981	Corinthians	97	(11)
1981–1982	Juventus-SP		
1982	Francana		
1983	Juventus-SP		

Managerial career
- 1997–1999: Portuguesa (women)
- 1999: Brazil women
- 2000–2001: Portuguesa (women)
- * Club domestic league appearances and goals

Wilson de Oliveira Riça (born 13 March 1950), commonly known as Wilsinho, is a Brazilian former professional footballer and manager.

== Playing career ==
A winger, Wilsinho played for Portuguesa de Desportos for most of his career. He made 249 appearances for the club and scored 32 goals, participating in winning the state championship in 1973. With Corinthians, he was again state champion in 1979, making 97 appearances and scoring 11 goals. He also played for Juventus and Francana.

== Managerial career ==
Wilsinho was the head coach of the Brazil women's national team at the 1999 FIFA Women's World Cup and for Portuguesa de Desportos women's team.

== Honours ==
=== Player ===
Portuguesa

- Campeonato Paulista: 1973
- Taça Estado de São Paulo: 1973
- Copa Governador do Estado de São Paulo: 1976

Corinthians

- Campeonato Paulista: 1979

=== Manager ===
Portuguesa women

- Campeonato Brasileiro: 1999–2000
- Campeonato Paulista: 1998, 2000
