= José Duarte (football manager) =

Brazilian football manager

Zé Duarte
Personal information
- Full name: José Duarte
- Date of birth: 19 October 1935
- Place of birth: Campinas, Brazil
- Date of death: 23 July 2004 (aged 68)
- Place of death: Campinas, Brazil

Managerial career
- Years: Team
- 1966: Ponte Preta U20
- 1967–1968: Guarani
- 1969: Ponte Preta
- 1971–1975: Guarani
- 1975: Saad
- 1976: Ponte Preta
- 1976: Santos
- 1977: Ponte Preta
- 1978: Cruzeiro
- 1979: Fluminense
- 1979: Internacional
- 1979–1980: Ponte Preta
- 1980–1982: Guarani
- 1984: Bahia
- 1984: Ponte Preta
- 1985: XV de Jaú
- 1986: Botafogo-SP
- 1987: Guarani
- 1988: Noroeste
- 1988–1989: União São João
- 1990: Atlético Paranaense
- 1990: Guarani
- 1992: Sãocarlense
- 1997–1998: Brazil Women
- 1999: Sãocarlense
- 2000: Brazil Women
- 2001: Ponte Preta (feminino)
- 2003: Saad

José Duarte (19 October 1935 – 23 July 2004), commonly known as Zé Duarte, was a Brazilian football manager.

== Career ==
Duarte was the head coach of the Brazil women's national team at the 1996 Summer Olympics and 2000 Summer Olympics.
