= Vadão =

Brazilian footballer (1956–2020)

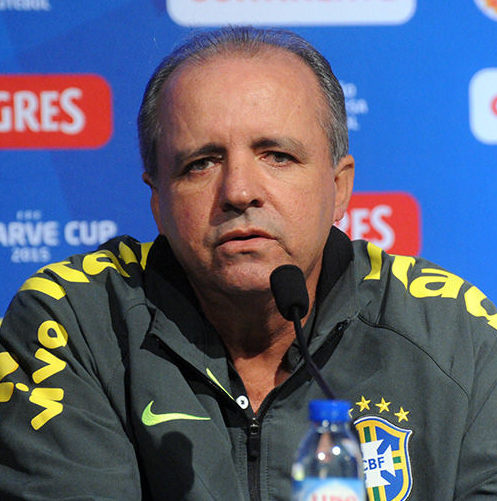
- Vadão in 2015

Personal information
- Full name: Oswaldo Fumeiro Alvarez
- Date of birth: 21 August 1956
- Place of birth: Monte Azul Paulista (SP), Brazil
- Date of death: 25 May 2020 (aged 63)
- Place of death: São Paulo, Brazil
- Height: 1.76 m (5 ft 9 1/2 in)

Managerial career
- Years: Team
- 1990–1994: Mogi Mirim
- 1995–1996: XV de Piracicaba
- 1997: Guarani
- 1997–1998: Mogi Mirim
- 1998: Guarani
- 1999: Matonense
- 1999–2000: Atlético Paranaense
- 2000: Corinthians
- 2001–2002: São Paulo
- 2002–2003: Ponte Preta
- 2003: Atlético Paranaense
- 2004: Bahia
- 2005: Ponte Preta
- 2005: Tokyo Verdy
- 2005–2006: Ponte Preta
- 2006: Atlético Paranaense
- 2007–2008: Vitória
- 2008: Goiás
- 2008–2009: São Caetano
- 2009–2010: Guarani
- 2010: Portuguesa
- 2011: São Caetano
- 2012: Guarani
- 2013: Sport
- 2013: Criciúma
- 2014: Ponte Preta
- 2014–2016: Brazil Women
- 2017: Guarani
- 2017–2019: Brazil Women

Oswaldo Fumeiro Alvarez (21 August 1956 – 25 May 2020), more commonly known as Vadão, was a Brazilian football manager. Although he managed several Brazilian men's teams over the course of his managerial career, he was best known for being the head coach of the Brazil women's national football team on two occasions, from 2014 to 2016, and from 2017 to 2019.

On 25 May 2020, Vadão died aged 63, with the cause of death being liver cancer.

== Managerial statistics ==
Team	From	To	Record				
Team	From	To	G	W	D	L	Win %
Tokyo Verdy	2005	2005	16	3	5	8	18.75
Total			16	3	5	8	18.75

== Honours ==
XV de Piracicaba

- Campeonato Brasileiro Série C: 1995

Atlético Paranaense

- Copa Libertadores Selective: 1999
- Campeonato Paranaense: 2000

São Paulo

- Torneio Rio-São Paulo: 2001

Tokyo Verdy

- Japanese Super Cup: 2005

Criciúma

- Campeonato Catarinense: 2013

Brazil Women

- Copa América Femenina: 2014, 2018
