= Esporte Clube Bahia (women) =

Women's football club based in Salvador, Bahia, Brazil

Bahia
- Full name: Esporte Clube Bahia
- Nickname: Mulheres de Aço
- Founded: 1989; 37 years ago
- Ground: Pituaçu
- Capacity: 32,157
- SAF Owner: City Football Group (90%)
- President: Emerson Ferretti
- Head coach: Felipe Freitas
- League: Campeonato Brasileiro Série A1; Campeonato Baiano
- 2025 2025: Série A1, 7th of 16; Baiano, 1st of 14 (champions)
Home colours	Away colours	Third colours

Esporte Clube Bahia, commonly known as Bahia or the Mulheres de Aço (Women of Steel), is a Brazilian women's Association football club, based in the city of Salvador, Bahia. It is the women's section of Esporte Clube Bahia. They won the Campeonato Brasileiro de Futebol Feminino Série A2 once.

== History ==
Founded in 1989, Bahia won the Campeonato Baiano de Futebol Feminino in their first active year. They were also crowned champions in the subsequent two seasons, before becoming inactive.

Bahia returned to an active status in November 2018, after establishing a partnership with Lusaca, to comply with the regulations of the Profut. They ended the partnership with Lusaca after the Campeonato Brasileiro de Futebol Feminino Série A2, and subsequently won the Baiano again.

Bahia achieved promotion to the Campeonato Brasileiro de Futebol Feminino Série A1 in 2020 and 2022, but suffered relegations in the subsequent year. In 2024, they won the Série A2 for the first time in their history.

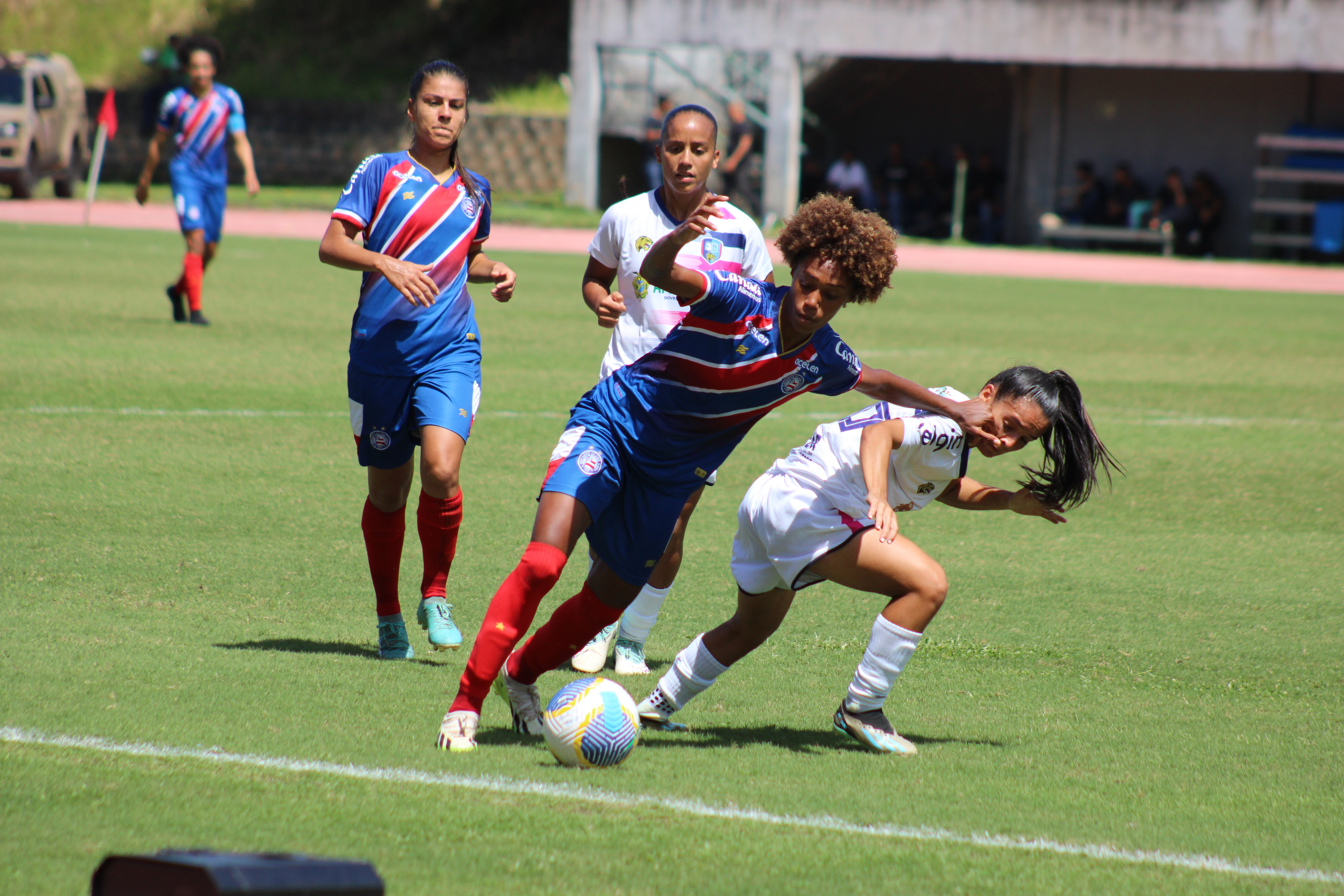
Bahia playing the 2024 Campeonato Brasileiro de Futebol Feminino Série Série A2 final

== Players ==
=== Current squad ===
As of 12 April 2026.

Note: Flags indicate national team as defined under FIFA eligibility rules; some limited exceptions apply. Players may hold more than one non-FIFA nationality.

No.	Pos.	Nation	Player
2	DF	BRA	Dan
3	DF	BRA	Aila
4	DF	BRA	Natalie Nalon
5	MF	URU	Ángela Gómez
6	DF	BRA	Anaju
7	FW	URU	Wendy Rosa
8	MF	BRA	Treyci
9	FW	BRA	Gica
10	FW	BRA	Taty Sena
11	FW	BRA	Dany Silva
12	GK	BRA	Yanne
13	DF	BRA	Mila Santos
14	DF	BRA	Rute
15	DF	BRA	Carol Martins
17	FW	BRA	Roque

No.	Pos.	Nation	Player
18	MF	BRA	Vilma
20	FW	BRA	Ellen
22	GK	BRA	Isa Cruz
24	GK	BRA	Kerolyn
27	MF	BRA	Raquel
28	FW	BRA	Cássia
64	DF	BRA	Tchula
70	MF	URU	Martina Terra
71	MF	BRA	Eduarda Tosti
77	MF	BRA	Suelen
80	GK	BRA	Mary Camilo
96	FW	BRA	Ju Oliveira
97	DF	BRA	Isa Fernandes
98	MF	BRA	Helô Faria

== Honours ==
=== Official tournaments ===
National
Competitions	Titles	Seasons
Campeonato Brasileiro Série A2	1	2024
State
Competitions	Titles	Seasons
Campeonato Baiano	9	1989, 1990, 1991, 2019, 2021, 2022, 2023, 2024, 2025

== See also ==
- Esporte Clube Bahia
