= Márcio Oliveira =

Brazilian women's football manager

Personal information
- Full name: Márcio Antônio de Oliveira
- Date of birth: 1959 (age 66–67)
- Place of birth: Brazil

Team information
- Current team: Pinda (women)

Managerial career
- Years: Team
- 2003–2013: São José (women)
- 2012–2014: Brazil (women)
- 2017: São José (women)
- 2022: EC São Bernardo (women)
- 2025–: Pinda (women)

Márcio Antônio de Oliveira (born 1959), better known as Márcio Oliveira, is a Brazilian women's football manager.

== Career ==
A physical education teacher, Oliveira started the women's football project at São José EC, and stood out by winning two Copa Libertadores Femenina titles and two Copa do Brasil, which qualified him to replace Jorge Barcellos in command of the Brazil women's team in 2012, a position Oliveira held until 2014. After this time at national team, he coached São José again in 2017 and later the EC São Bernardo in 2022 and Pinda in 2025 season.

== Honours ==
São José women

- Copa Libertadores: 2011, 2013
- Copa do Brasil: 2012, 2013
- Campeonato Paulista: 2012

Brazil women

- International Women's Football Tournament: 2012, 2013
