= Campeonato Baiano de Futebol Feminino =

Women's football league in Bahia, Brazil

- Founded: 1984
- Country: Brazil
- Confederation: FBF
- Promotion to: Brasileiro Série A3
- Current champions: Bahia (9th title) (2025)
- Most championships: São Francisco (14 titles)
- Current: 2025

The Campeonato Baiano de Futebol Feminino is the women's football state championship of Bahia State, and is contested since 1984.

== List of champions ==
Following is the list with all recognized titles of Campeonato Baiano Feminino:

Season	Champions	Runners-up
1984	Bahiano de Tênis (1)	Flamengo de Feira
1985	Bahiano de Tênis (1)	
1986	Flamengo de Feira (1)	Bahiano de Tênis
1987	Flamengo de Feira (2)	
1988	Flamengo de Feira (3)	
1989	Bahia (1)	
1990	Bahia (2)	
1991	Bahia (3)	
1992	Not held	
1993	Euroexport (1)	
1994	Euroexport (2)	
1995	Euroexport (3)	
1996–1997	Not held	
1998	Flamengo de Feira (4)	
1999	Galícia (1)	
2000	Flamengo de Feira (5)	
2001	São Francisco (1)	Flamengo de Feira
2002	São Francisco (2)	Vasco de Areias
2003	São Francisco (3)	Flamengo de Feira
2004	São Francisco (4)	Flamengo de Feira
2005	São Francisco (5)	Clube 2004
2006	São Francisco (6)	Fluminense de Feira
2007	Not held	
2008	São Francisco (7)	Fluminense de Feira
2009	São Francisco (8)	Vitória
2010	São Francisco (9)	Flamengo de Feira
2011	São Francisco (10)	Lusaca
2012	São Francisco (11)	Flamengo de Feira
2013	São Francisco (12)	Bahia
2014	São Francisco (13)	Vitória
2015–16	São Francisco (14)	Lusaca
2016–17	Vitória (1)	Juventude Esportiva
2017	Lusaca (1)	Jequié EC
2018	Vitória (2)	Lusaca
2019	Bahia (4)	Juventude Esportiva
2020	Not held	
2021	Bahia (5)	Doce Mel
2022	Bahia (6)	Doce Mel
2023	Bahia (7)	Vitória
2024	Bahia (8)	Vitória
2025	Bahia (9)	Vitória

== Titles by team ==
Teams in bold stills active.

Rank	Club	Winners	Winning years
1	**São Francisco**	14	2001, 2002, 2003, 2004, 2005, 2006, 2008, 2009, 2010, 2011, 2012, 2013, 2014, 2015–16
2	**Bahia**	9	1989, 1990, 1991, 2019, 2021, 2022, 2023, 2024, 2025
3	Flamengo de Feira	5	1986, 1987, 1988, 1998, 2000
4	Euroexport	3	1993, 1994, 1995
5	Bahiano de Tênis	2	1984, 1985
5	**Vitória**	2	2016–17, 2018
7	**Galícia**	1	1999
7	**Lusaca**	1	2017

=== By city ===
City	Championships	Clubs
Salvador	17	Bahia (9), Euroexport (3), Bahiano de Tênis (2), Vitória (2), Galícia (1)
São Francisco do Conde	14	São Francisco (14)
Feira de Santana	5	Flamengo de Feira (5)
Dias d'Ávila	1	Lusaca (1)
