= Carla Nunes =

Brazilian footballer (born 1991)

Personal information
- Full name: Carla Jéssica Pereira Nunes
- Date of birth: 8 June 1991 (age 35)
- Place of birth: Valinhos, Brazil
- Position: Forward

Team information
- Current team: Fluminense
- Number: 9

Senior career*
Years	Team	Apps	(Gls)
2015	São Paulo		
2015–2016	Portuguesa	4	(2)
2017	Audax	15	(8)
2020	Palmeiras	27	(26)
2021	São Paulo	0	(0)
2022	3B da Amazônia	6	(1)
2023	Internacional	2	(0)
2024–	Fluminense	10	(0)
- * Club domestic league appearances and goals as of 15:31, 20 May 2024 (UTC)

Carla Jéssica Pereira Nunes (born 8 June 1991), known as Carla Nunes, is a Brazilian footballer who plays as a forward for Fluminense.

== Career ==
Nunes, playing for Palmeiras, finished as the top goalscorer in the 2020 Campeonato Brasileiro de Futebol Feminino Série A1 with 12 goals. At the point of leaving Palmeiras, she was the club's record goalscorer in all competitions with 34 goals in 49 matches. Nunes joined São Paulo on 18 January 2021, a club that she had previously played for in 2015.
