= Douglas Onça =

Brazilian footballer (born 1957)

Personal information
- Full name: Douglas Lima Onça
- Date of birth: 31 July 1957 (age 69)
- Place of birth: Araraquara, Brazil
- Position: Midfielder

Youth career
- Ferroviária

Senior career*
Years	Team	Apps	(Gls)
1979–1984	Ferroviária	270	(66)
1984	→ Coritiba (loan)		
1985	Sport Recife		
1986	Avaí		
1987	Marcílio Dias		
1987	Catanduvense		
1988	Atlético Goianiense		
1989	Marcílio Dias		

Managerial career
- 2011–2013: Ferroviária (women)
- 2013–2014: Ferroviária (youth)
- 2014–2015: Ferroviária (women)
- 2017–2019: Ferroviária (women youth)
- * Club domestic league appearances and goals as of 31 May 2025

Douglas Lima Onça (born 31 July 1957) is a Brazilian former professional footballer and manager.

== Playing career ==
Born in Araraquara, Onça began his career at Ferroviária, making his professional debut in 1979. He played for the club until 1983, being loaned to Coritiba in 1984. He also played for Sport Recife, Avaí, Marcílio Dias, GE Catanduvense and Atlético Goianiense, where he was part of the state champion squad in 1988. Onça played in 270 matches for Ferroviária, scoring 66 goals, making him the club's fifth highest scorer.

== Managerial career ==
As a coach, Onça was entrusted with the Ferroviária women's football project, which achieved many of its greatest achievements with him, such as the state title in 2013, and the Copa do Brasil and the Campeonato Brasileiro in 2014. He also worked at Ferroviária in the youth teams and in coordination positions.

== Honours ==
=== Player ===
Atlético Goianiense

- Campeonato Goiano: 1988

=== Manager ===
Ferroviária women

- Campeonato Paulista: 2013
- Campeonato Brasileiro Série A1: 2014
- Copa do Brasil: 2014
