= Josué Kaercher =

Brazilian footballer (1980–2015)

Personal information
- Full name: Josué Henrique Kaercher
- Date of birth: 1 December 1980
- Place of birth: Florianópolis, Brazil
- Date of death: 11 December 2015 (aged 35)
- Place of death: Caçador, Brazil
- Position: Defender

Youth career
- –2006: Figueirense

Senior career*
Years	Team	Apps	(Gls)
2007	Joaçaba AC		
2008	Três Passos		
2008	Videira		
2009	Cáceres		
2009	Operário-SC		
2010	Cacerense		
2010	São José-PR		
2010–2014	Caçador		
2014	Fluminense-SC		

Managerial career
- 2015: Kindermann (women)
- * Club domestic league appearances and goals as of 3 June 2025

Josué Henrique Kaercher (1 December 1980 – 11 December 2015) was a Brazilian professional footballer and who played as a defender, and a women's football manager.

== Playing career ==
Having started his career in the youth sector of Figueirense, Kaecher had a modest career, playing for lower level teams in Santa Catarina, Mato Grosso and Paraná.

== Managerial career ==
After retiring as a player, Kaercher began his career as a coach at SE Kindermann, a women's team from Caçador, having won the 2015 Women's Brazilian Cup title with the club.

== Personal life and death ==
Josué Karcher was killed in a hotel room on the morning of 11 December 2015, by the former coach of the SE Kindermann futsal team Carlos Corrêa, who had been fired and distraught, invaded the club's professionals' concentration, taking six hostages and ending with the execution of Kaercher.

His brother Julio, was also a professional footballer and played with Josué in several teams, like Caçador AC.

== Honours ==
=== Player ===
Caçador

- Campeonato Catarinense Série C: 2012

=== Manager ===
Kindermann women

- Copa do Brasil: 2015
