= 1995 South American Women's Football Championship =

Campeonato Sul-Americano de Futebol Feminino de 1995

Tournament details
- Host country: Brazil
- Dates: 8–22 January
- Teams: 5 (from 1 confederation)
- Venue: 1 (in 1 host city)

Final positions
- Champions: Brazil (2nd title)
- Runners-up: Argentina
- Third place: Chile
- Fourth place: Ecuador

Tournament statistics
- Matches played: 11
- Goals scored: 86 (7.82 per match)
- Top scorer: (Brazil) Sissi (12 goals)

The 1995 South American Women's Football Championship (Campeonato Sudamericano de Fútbol Femenino 1995) was held in Uberlândia, Brazil between 8 and 22 January. It was the second staging of the South American Women's Football Championship and determined the CONMEBOL's single qualifier for the 1995 FIFA Women's World Cup. Only five national teams took part in the tournament.

Brazil won the tournament, after beating Argentina 2–0 in the final.

== Venue ==
The only venue used for the tournament was the Estádio Parque do Sabiá, located in Uberlândia

Uberlândia
Estádio Parque do Sabiá
Capacity: 48.000
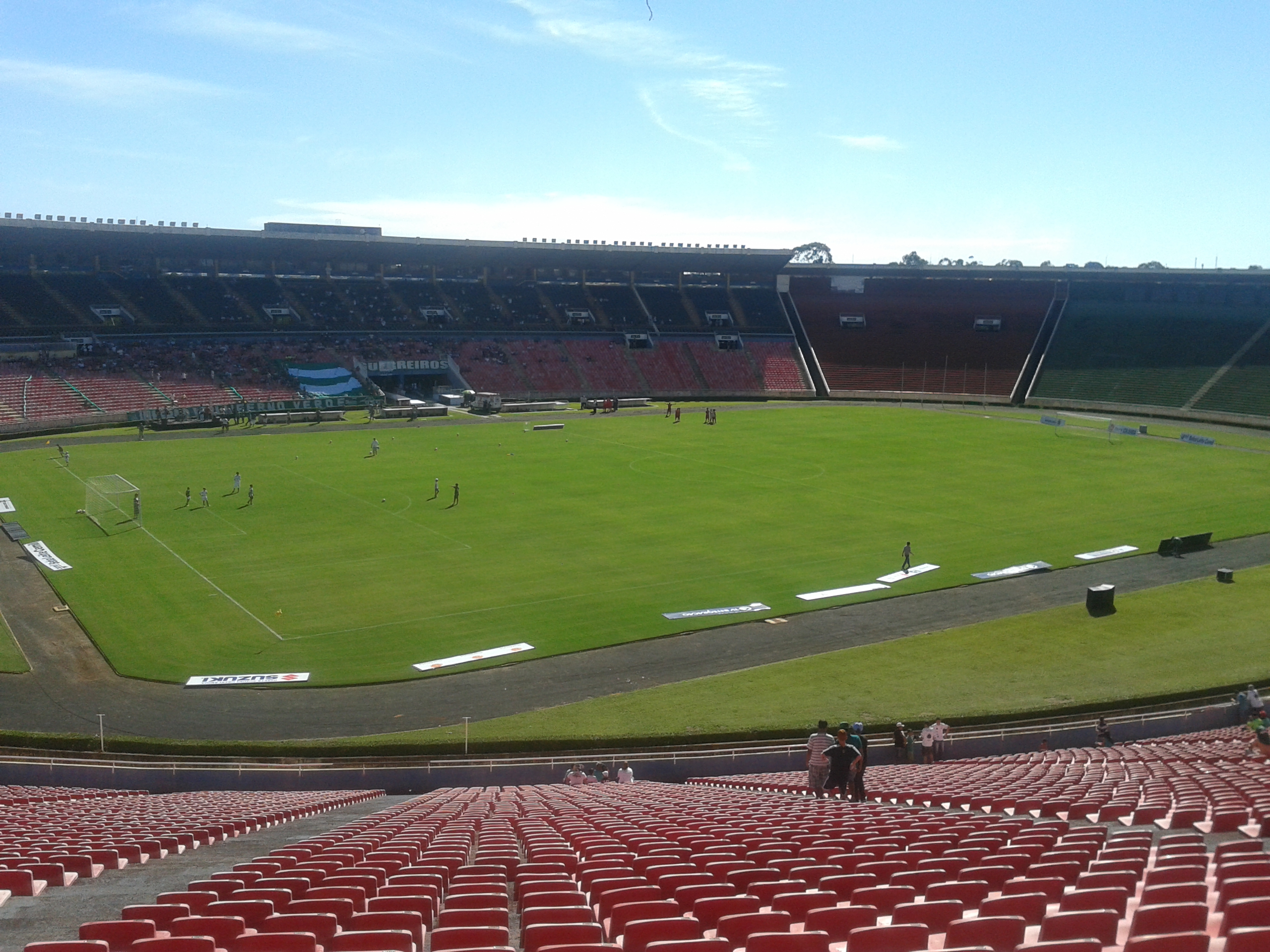

== Officials ==
The following referees were named for the tournament:

- (Argentina) Marco Ernesto Aguas
- (Argentina) Luis Olivetto
- (Chile) Nestor Mondría

== Results ==
The tournament was set up in a round-robin format, where each team played one match against each of the other teams within the group. The top two teams in the group advanced to a final match where the winner qualified for the 1995 FIFA Women's World Cup in Sweden.

Three points were awarded for a win, one point for a draw, and zero points for a loss.

- Tie-breaker
  - If teams finish leveled on points, the following tie-breakers are used:
  1. greater goal difference in all group games;
  2. greater number of goals scored in all group games;
  3. winner of the head-to-head match between the teams in question;
  4. drawing of lots.

=== Group stage ===
Team	Pld	W	D	L	GF	GA	GD	Pts	Qualification
Brazil	4	4	0	0	42	1	+41	12	Final match
Argentina	4	3	0	1	18	9	+9	9	Final match
Chile	4	1	1	2	14	9	+5	4	
Ecuador	4	1	1	2	9	21	–12	4	
Bolivia	4	0	0	4	1	44	–43	0	

8 January 1995
16:30 UTC-3

Brazil	13–0	Ecuador
Pretinha (?); Cenira (?); Roseli (?); Michael Jackson (?); Sissi (?); Russa (?)	Report

Estádio Parque do Sabiá, Uberlândia
Referee: Nestor Mondría (Chile)
8 January 1995

Chile	11–0	Bolivia
Flores (?); Sánchez (?); Astudillo (?); Cruz (?); Acevedo (?); Bravo (?); Ayala (?)

Estádio Parque do Sabiá, Uberlândia

10 January 1995
20:00 UTC-3

Brazil	6–1	Chile
Sissi (?); Roseli (?); Cenira (?); Michael Jackson (?)	Report	Bravo (?)

Estádio Parque do Sabiá, Uberlândia
Referee: Marco Ernesto Aguas (Argentina)
10 January 1995
22:00 UTC-3

Argentina	5–1	Ecuador
Ochotorena (?); Morales (?); Arce (?)		Carmen Olivo (?)

Estádio Parque do Sabiá, Uberlândia

12 January 1995

Argentina	12–0	Bolivia
Ochotorena (?); Villanueva (?); Morales (?); Cardoso (?); Asperes (?)

Estádio Parque do Sabiá, Uberlândia
12 January 1995

Chile	2–2	Ecuador
Bravo (?); Flores (?)		Mercedes Mena (?); Fabiola (?)

Estádio Parque do Sabiá, Uberlândia

14 January 1995
16:00 UTC-3

Brazil	8–0	Argentina
Sissi 16', 31', 57' (pen.), 83' (pen.); Roseli 43'; Pretinha 47', 84'; Elane 64'	Report

Estádio Parque do Sabiá, Uberlândia
Referee: Nestor Mondría (Chile)
14 January 1995

Ecuador	6–1	Bolivia
Mayra Ramírez (?); Vera (?); Carmen Olivo (?)		Duran (?)

Estádio Parque do Sabiá, Uberlândia

18 January 1995

Brazil	15–0	Bolivia
Roseli (?); Márcia Taffarel (?); Michael Jackson (?); Sissi (?); Elane (?); Duda (?); Bel (?); Cenira (?)	Report

Estádio Parque do Sabiá, Uberlândia
Referee: Luis Olivetto (Argentina)
18 January 1995

Argentina	1–0	Chile
Ochotorena (?)

Estádio Parque do Sabiá, Uberlândia

=== Final ===
22 January 1995
16:00 UTC-3

Brazil	2–0	Argentina
Michael Jackson 4'; Roseli 50'	Report

Estádio Parque do Sabiá, Uberlândia
Attendance: 50,000
Referee: Nestor Mondría (Chile)

Brazil won the tournament and qualified for the 1995 FIFA Women's World Cup.

== Awards ==
1995 South American Women's Football Championship

Brazil
2nd title

== Statistics ==
=== Goalscorers ===
12 goals

- (Brazil) Sissi

7 goals

- (Argentina) Fabiana Ochotorena
- (Brazil) Michael Jackson
- (Brazil) Roseli

6 goals

- (Brazil) Pretinha

5 goals

- (Chile) Ingrid Flores

4 goals

- (Argentina) Karina Morales
- (Brazil) Cenira

3 goals

- (Argentina) María Villanueva
- (Brazil) Russa
- (Chile) María Bravo
- (Ecuador) Ana Vera

2 goals

- (Argentina) Cardoso
- (Brazil) Elane
- (Chile) Sánchez
- (Ecuador) Carmen Olivo
- (Ecuador) Mayra Ramírez

1 goal

- (Argentina) Andrea Arce
- (Argentina) Asperes
- (Bolivia) Mary Duran
- (Brazil) Bel
- (Brazil) Duda
- (Brazil) Márcia Taffarel
- (Chile) Fresia Acevedo
- (Chile) Astudillo
- (Chile) Ayala
- (Chile) Cruz
- (Ecuador) Mercedes Mena

Own goals

- (Chile) Fabiola (playing against Ecuador)
