= Saad Esporte Clube =

Saad
- Full name: Saad Esporte Clube
- Founded: 28 April 1961
- Dissolved: 2013; 12 years ago
Home colours	Away colours

Saad Esporte Clube was a Brazilian association football club founded 1961 in São Caetano do Sul on the outskirts of São Paulo. In the latter part of the first decade of the 21st century, the club established an autonomous department in Campo Grande, the capital of the state of Mato Grosso do Sul, as the main focus of its notable activities. In between, the club also represented the city of Águas de Lindóia in the São Paulo state hinterland.

Saad EC participated from 1974 for two years in the first division of the São Paulo State Championship. From 2010, the club played three seasons in the first division of Mato Grosso do Sul.

The Saad women's team, established in 1985, dominated the 1990s and won practically three national championships between 1996 and 2003. Its last success was winning the first official cup competition in 2007, then lining up nominally as Mato Grosso do Sul FC.

== History ==
On April 28, 1961, Saad Esporte Clube was founded by the businessman Felício José Saad as a replacement for another club, the Associação Atlética São Bento - not to be confused with the club Associação Atlética São Bento of the city of São Paulo, which existed between 1914 and 1935 - which folded in the late 1950s.

In 1966, the club professionalised and in the year thereafter it ascended to the second division of the São Paulo State Championship. in 1974 and 1975, it played as an invitee in the first division. Until 1990, with the exception of 1989, the club played in the second division. In the last year, the club represented the city of Águas de Lindóia in the São Paulo state hinterland. The men's team was dissolved thereafter, before a revival in 2009 as MS/Saad in the second division of the Campeonato Sul-Mato-Grossense. From 2010 to 2012 the club played there in the first division.

Probably the best known player in the club's history was the 16 times Brazilian international José Ribamar de Oliveira "Canhoteiro". He is generally considered one of the best left wingers of all time and ended his career with the club in 1967 aged approximately 35.

=== Women's football ===
In 1985, the Campinas (SP) based Guarani FC discontinued its women's football department which then practically joined in its entirety Saad EC. In 1993 Saad became the first club in the country to offer its female athletes a minimum wage of US$100. The women of Saad remained unbeaten in all of their official matches from 1994 to 1996 and won in 1996 the Brazilian Women's Championship. In 1989, Saad won the Troféu Brasil and in 2003 the Circuito Brasileiro de Futebol Feminino, both then the highest possible achievements in Brazilian women's football.

In 2007, the team of Saad EC lined up as Mato Grosso do Sul FC, based officially in the state capital Campo Grande and won the first Copa do Brasil de Futebol Feminino, organized by the Brazilian football association, the CBF. In the same year Saad finished third in a tournament Liga Nacional de Futebol Feminino and which was only held in that year, with Santos FC being the winner. Saad participated in the following two years under its own name in the Copa, advancing to the eighth and quarter-finals respectively, before ceasing top level activities in women's football.

In 1997, Saad Esporte Clube U17 squad finished first in the CBF (Confederacao Brasileira de Futebol) sponsored National Championship, becoming the one and only champion.

In the late 1990s, the club was involved with a United States University women's soccer program at the National American University of Rapid City (SD), which had some second tier successes.

== Honours ==
=== Women's Football ===
- Campeonato Brasileiro de Futebol Feminino
  - Winners (1): 1996
- Copa do Brasil de Futebol Feminino
  - Winners (1): 2007
