= Brazil women's national football team =

Women's national association football team representing Brazil

Brazil
- Nickname(s): Seleção (The National Squad); As Canarinhas (The Female Canaries); Verde-Amarela (Green-and-Yellow)
- Association: Confederação Brasileira de Futebol (CBF)
- Confederation: CONMEBOL (South America)
- Head coach: Arthur Elias
- Captain: Rafaelle Souza
- Most caps: Formiga (217)
- Top scorer: Marta (121)
- FIFA code: BRA
First colours	Second colours

FIFA ranking
- Current: 7 (20 October 2026)
- Highest: 2 (March – June 2009)
- Lowest: 11 (September 2019; December 2023)

First international
- United States 2–1 Brazil (Jesolo, Italy; 22 July 1986)

Biggest win
- Brazil 15–0 Bolivia (Uberlândia, Brazil; 18 January 1995); Brazil 15–0 Peru (Mar del Plata, Argentina; 2 March 1998)

Biggest defeat
- United States 6–0 Brazil (Denver, United States; 26 September 1999)

World Cup
- Appearances: 10 (first in 1991)
- Best result: Runners-up (2007)

Olympic Games
- Appearances: 9 (first in 1996)
- Best result: Silver medalists (2004, 2008, 2024)

Copa América
- Appearances: 10 (first in 1991)
- Best result: Champions (1991, 1995, 1998, 2003, 2010, 2014, 2018, 2022, 2025)

CONCACAF W Championship
- Appearances: 1 (first in 2000)
- Best result: Runners-up (2000)

CONCACAF W Gold Cup
- Appearances: 1 (first in 2024)
- Best result: Runners-up (2024)
Medal record
FIFA Women's World Cup
Silver medal – second place	2007 China	Team
Bronze medal – third place	1999 United States	Team
Olympic Games
Silver medal – second place	2004 Athens	Team
Silver medal – second place	2008 Beijing	Team
Silver medal – second place	2024 Paris	Team
Copa América Femenina
Gold medal – first place	1991 Brazil
Gold medal – first place	1995 Brazil
Gold medal – first place	1998 Argentina
Gold medal – first place	2003 Peru, Argentina & Ecuador
Gold medal – first place	2010 Ecuador	Team
Gold medal – first place	2014 Ecuador	Team
Gold medal – first place	2018 Chile	Team
Gold medal – first place	2022 Colombia	Team
Gold medal – first place	2025 Ecuador	Team
Silver medal – second place	2006 Argentina
CONCACAF W Gold Cup
Silver medal – second place	2024 United States	Team
Pan American Games
Gold medal – first place	2003 Santo Domingo	Team
Gold medal – first place	2007 Rio de Janeiro	Team
Gold medal – first place	2015 Toronto	Team
Silver medal – second place	2011 Guadalajara	Team
UEFA–CONMEBOL Finalissima
Silver medal – second place	2023 England
CONCACAF Women's Gold Cup
Silver medal – second place	2000 United States

The Brazil women's national football team (Portuguese: Seleção Brasileira Feminina de futebol) represents Brazil in international women's football and is run by the Brazilian Football Confederation (CBF). Launched in 1986, the team has participated in all nine editions of the FIFA Women's World Cup, finishing third in 1999 and second in 2007. The team has played in all ten editions of the Copa América Femenina, winning nine editions and finishing second in one edition. The team won the silver medal at the Olympic Games in 2004, 2008 and 2024. In 1998 and 1999, the team finished second at the Women's U.S. Cup. The 2027 FIFA Women's World Cup will be held in Brazil, making it the first edition of the tournament held in South America.

== History ==
Although today the Brazilian Women's National Team is one of the best in the world, it was not that long ago that women were not even allowed to watch a game. The women's game filtered sporadically throughout Brazil with popular traction in the early 20th century. Magazines such as O imparcial and Jornal dos sports covered the women's game praising their achievements in local cup competitions. Yet, the traditional order of futbol as "purely masculine" came into contention resulting in the games downfall. Until, the mid-1940s when Brazil became a dictatorship subsequently banning the women's game.

Banned by the Minister of Education and Health in 1941, eugenic ideologies from the new dictatorship called for the protection of womanly bodies, thus sports became a disqualified endeavor. The game was male dominated, and those who could not perform well were even called feminine at times. Throughout the time of the ban, women were observed playing quite frequently forcing the Conselho Nacional de Desportos (CND) to take charge and reissue bans that were not working. In 1965, Deliberation no. 7 further forced an end to all women's sports in Brazil, not just football. This ban would not be lifted until the late 1970s, when Brazil passed Amnesty Laws allowing political exiles back into the country.

A surge of Brazilian feminists returned to their country eager to change the social landscape inspired by the Western feminist movements of the 60s and 70s. Fan bases for the women's team with a new identity rooted themselves in the fabric of history and with the support of the general public the women's game led a rise in feminism that swept across the country. In 1979, the National Sports Council of Brazil passed Deliberation no. 10 reinstating the women's game. Early professional women's football club EC Radar, founded in 1982, dominated the first editions of the Taça Brasil de Futebol Feminino and served as Brazil's representation in the 1986 Mundialito and 1988 FIFA Women's Invitation Tournament. Its players also formed the majority of Brazil's roster at the inaugural 1991 FIFA Women's World Cup, in which Elane scored the nation's first Women's World Cup goal on 17 November 1991. The Brazil women's national team played their first game on 22 July 1986 against the United States, losing 2–1.

Today, the national team has won the Copa America 9 times and has made it to the world cup finals where they were beaten by Germany. While the team played its first official match in 1986, only 5 years later they won their first title in Copa America, and only 9 years after that they were challenging the world's best.

=== Futebol Feminino ===
Sissi at the 2000 Summer Olympics

Brazil was Latin America's first country to legally recognize futebol feminino. As the first nation to popularize the women's game it was a hard sell for many Brazilians caught up with traditional gender roles. Up until the national team started participating on the international stage. After the debut of women's association football in the 1996 Summer Olympics in Atlanta the women's game skyrocketed in admiration. In order to capitalize off of the teams commencement and fourth-place finish the State of São Paulo created Paulistana. The Paulistana was a domestic competition meant to attract young up and coming players for the national team. However, the methodology of Paulistana linked itself to the process futbol feminization. The administrators and managers who ran the competition scalped white, beautiful, and non-masculine players. An attempt to beautify the women's sport for the largely male population of futbol consumers. The 1999 World Cup golden boot winner Sissi noticed the negative effects of beautification over athletics and left for overseas competition. The introduction of the Campeonato Brasileiro de Futebol Feminino in 2013 reinvigorated the domestic competition attracting the Brazilian stars of the national team back into the country.

=== 2017 controversy ===
In 2017, the Brazilian Football Confederation fired head coach Emily Lima, which sparked protest among the team's players. The dispute evolved into an argument for greater wages, and more respect and recognition for the country's female football players. As a result, players such as Cristiane, Rosana, and Francielle announced their retirement from international football, hoping that this decision might make a difference in the years to come.

=== 2024: Return to the podium ===
In 2024 the team reached the final at the Summer Olympic Games and was defeated by the United States team, securing their third silver medal and making a return to the Olympic podium after 16 years of absence.

=== 2025: Ninth Copa America title ===
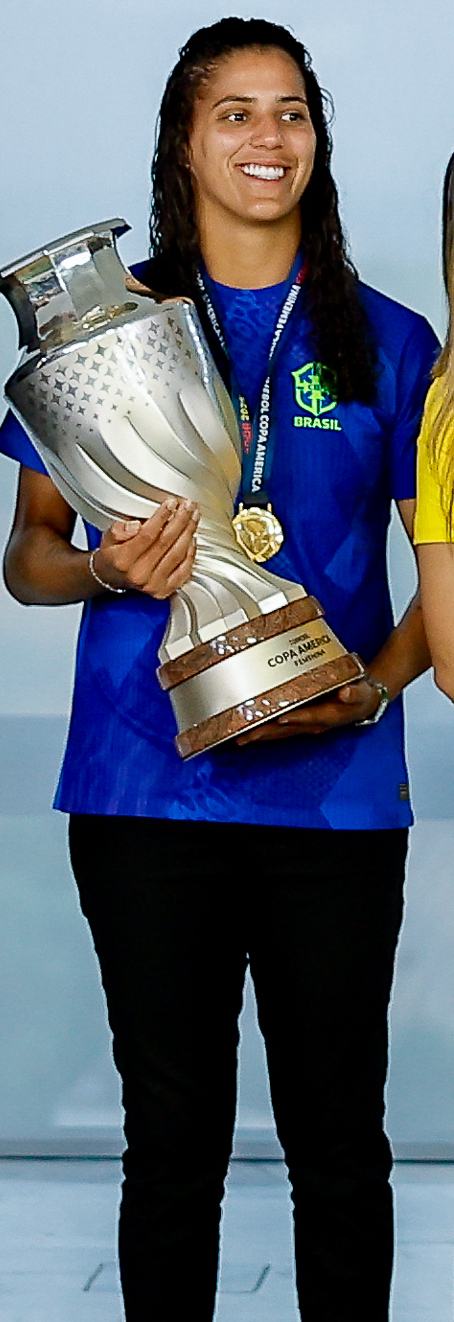
Forward Amanda Gutierres with the 2025 Copa America Femenina's trophy and medal

In 2025 Brazil defeated the team of Colombia at the Copa America Femenina final on penalties and secured their ninth title, maintaining their record of being at least finalists in all editions of the tournament.

=== 2027 FIFA Women's World Cup ===
Brazil will hold the 2027 FIFA Women's World Cup, which will mark the first time the tournament is taking place in South America, it will also be the first time to be held in Latin America. Brazil automatically qualified as host.

== Team image ==
=== Nicknames ===
The Brazil women's national football team has been known or nicknamed as the "Seleção (The National Squad)", "As Canarinhas (The Female Canaries)","Verde-Amarela (Green-and-Yellow)" or "Mulheres deste solo"(Women of this soil).

=== Kits and crest ===
==== Kit suppliers ====
Kit supplier	Period	Contract announcement	Contract duration	Value	Ref.
Topper	1986–1991		1986–1991		
Umbro	1991–1996		1991–1996		
Nike	1997–present	December 1996	1997–2007	Total $200 million~$250 million	
Nike	1997–present	Unknown	2008–2026	€69.5 million per year	

Under the CBF requirements both men's and women's national teams are supplied by the same kit manufacturer. The current sponsorship deal is signed with Nike. Although, the details of the kit differ in style. The crest of the women's national team is produced without the five star accolades from previous men's World Cup titles. In honor of the burgeoning history of the women's team they will only attach star merits based on their own performances.

== FIFA world rankings ==
As of 1 August 2021

Worst Ranking Best Ranking Worst Mover Best Mover

Brazil's FIFA world rankings
Rank	Year	Games Played	Won	Lost	Drawn	Best		Worst	
Rank	Year	Games Played	Won	Lost	Drawn	Rank	Move	Rank	Move
7	2021	9	5	1	3	–	▲ –	–	▼ –

== Results and fixtures ==
The following is a list of match results in the last 12 months, as well as any future matches that have been scheduled.

Legend

Win Draw Loss Fixture

=== 2025 ===
25 October Friendly	England	1–2	Brazil	Manchester, England
17:30 BST (UTC+1)	Stanway 52' (pen.)	Report	Zaneratto 9'; Dudinha 18'	Stadium: City of Manchester Stadium; Attendance: 37,460; Referee: Natalie Simon (United States)

28 October Friendly	Italy	0–1	Brazil	Parma, Italy
18:15 CET (UTC+1)		Report	Luany 68'	Stadium: Stadio Ennio Tardini; Attendance: 3,800; Referee: Amina Gutschi (Austria)

28 November Friendly	Norway	3–1	Brazil	La Línea, Spain
19:00 CET (UTC+1)	Gaupset 11', 53'; Stølen Godø 69' (pen.)	Report	Mariza 44'	Stadium: Estadio Municipal de La Línea; Attendance: 374; Referee: Frederikke Lydia Søkjær (Denmark)

2 December Friendly	Portugal	0–5	Brazil	Aveiro, Portugal
19:45 WET (UTC+0)		Report	Zanotti 1'; Ludmila 16'; Dudinha 37'; Chagas 73'; Zaneratto 90' (pen.)	Stadium: Estádio Municipal de Aveiro; Attendance: 15,323; Referee: Riem Hussein (Germany)

=== 2026 ===
27 February Friendly	Costa Rica	2–5	Brazil	Alajuela, Costa Rica
19:00 UTC−6	Chinchilla 52', 67'	Report	Kerolin 11'; Jheniffer 14'; Maranhão 28', 90+2'; Adriana 81' (pen.)	Stadium: Estadio Alejandro Morera Soto; Referee: Félix Mojica (Nicaragua)

3 March Friendly	Brazil	1–2	Venezuela	Toluca, Mexico
15:00 UTC−6	Ribeiro 89'	Report	Romero 45'; Higuera 49'	Stadium: FMF Asociación; Referee: Francia González (Mexico)

7 March Friendly	Mexico	1–0	Brazil	Mexico City, Mexico
17:00 UTC−6	Espinoza 76'	Report		Stadium: Estadio Ciudad de los Deportes; Attendance: 24,876; Referee: Carly Shaw-MacLaren (Canada)

11 April 2026 FIFA Series	Brazil	5–1	South Korea	Cuiabá, Brazil
21:30 UTC−4	Borges 42'; Ludmila 47'; Dudinha 58'; Kerolin 61'; Maranhão 83'	Report	Park Soo-jeong 87'	Stadium: Arena Pantanal; Referee: Laura Fortunato (Argentina)

14 April 2026 FIFA Series	Brazil	6–1	Zambia	Cuiabá, Brazil
21:30 UTC−4	Yasmim 30'; Maranhão 47'; Angelina 60' (pen.); Bahia 77'; Kerolin 90+1'; Calhau 90+6'	Report	Banda 51'	Stadium: Arena Pantanal; Referee: Emikar Calderas (Venezuela)

18 April 2026 FIFA Series	Brazil	1–0	Canada	Cuiabá, Brazil
21:30 UTC−4	Gomes 47'	Report		Stadium: Arena Pantanal; Referee: María Victoria Daza (Colombia)

6 June Friendly	Brazil	2–1	United States	São Paulo, Brazil
18:30 UTC−3	Taina Maranhão 11'; Bia Zaneratto 14'	Report	Wilson 2'	Stadium: Neo Química Arena; Attendance: 31,336; Referee: María Eugenia Gil Soriano (Spain)

9 June Friendly	Brazil	0–1	United States	Fortaleza, Brazil
21:30 UTC−3		Report	Isabela 63' (o.g.)	Stadium: Arena Castelão; Attendance: 55,144; Referee: Paola Cebollada López (Spain)

10 October Friendly	Brazil	3–1	Argentina	Porto Alegre, Brazil
16:30 UTC−3	Luany 27'; Geyse 39'; Angelina 45+1'	Report	Pereyra 51'	Stadium: Estádio Beira-Rio; Attendance: 28,386; Referee: Erika Monserrat González Nevarez (Mexico)

13 October Friendly	Brazil	2–2	Argentina	São Lourenço da Mata, Brazil
20:30 UTC−3	Bia Zaneratto 13'; Gio Queiroz 28'	Report	Falfán 35'; Bonsegundo 55' (pen.)	Stadium: Arena Pernambuco; Attendance: 29,444; Referee: Erika Monserrat González Nevarez (Mexico)

29 November Friendly	Japan	v	Brazil	Hiroshima, Japan
		Report		Stadium: Edion Peace Wing Hiroshima

5 December Friendly	Japan	v	Brazil	Okayama, Japan
		Report		Stadium: JFE Harenokuni Stadium

=== 2027 ===
24 June 2027 FIFA Women's World Cup	Brazil	v	TBD	Rio de Janeiro, Brazil
--:-- UTC−3				Stadium: Maracanã Stadium

29 June 2027 FIFA Women's World Cup	Brazil	v	TBD	São Paulo, Brazil
--:-- UTC−3				Stadium: Arena Corinthians

4 July 2027 FIFA Women's World Cup	Brazil	v	TBD	Brasília, Brazil
--:-- UTC−3				Stadium: Estádio Nacional Mané Garrincha

== Head-to-head record ==
Counted for the FIFA A-level matches only.

As of 13 October 2026, after the match against Argentina.

Key
Positive balance (more Wins)
Neutral balance (Wins = Losses)
Negative balance (more Losses)

Nations	First played	M	W	D	L	GF	GA	GD	Confederation
Argentina	1995	23	19	2	2	76	15	61	CONMEBOL
Australia	1988	23	10	2	11	35	36	-2	AFC
Bolivia	1995	6	6	0	0	46	1	45	CONMEBOL
Cameroon	2012	1	1	0	0	5	0	5	CAF
Canada	1996	35	14	9	12	55	38	17	CONCACAF
Chile	1991	16	15	1	0	57	5	52	CONMEBOL
China	1986	13	6	6	1	27	9	18	AFC
Colombia	1998	15	11	4	0	52	10	42	CONMEBOL
Costa Rica	2000	6	6	0	0	25	3	22	CONCACAF
Denmark	2007	6	3	1	2	8	7	1	UEFA
Ecuador	1995	8	8	0	0	67	2	65	CONMEBOL
England	2017	5	2	1	2	6	6	0	UEFA
Equatorial Guinea	2011	1	1	0	0	3	0	3	CAF
Finland	1999	2	1	1	0	3	1	2	UEFA
France	2003	14	1	5	8	13	22	-9	UEFA
Germany	1995	13	2	4	7	15	29	-14	UEFA
Ghana	2008	1	1	0	0	5	1	4	CAF
Great Britain	2012	1	0	0	1	0	1	-1	UEFA
Greece	2004	1	1	0	0	7	0	7	UEFA
Haiti	2003	2	2	0	0	12	0	12	CONCACAF
Hungary	1996	5	5	0	0	20	3	17	UEFA
Iceland	2017	1	1	0	0	1	0	1	UEFA
India	2021	1	1	0	0	6	1	5	AFC
Italy	1999	10	9	1	0	21	6	15	UEFA
Jamaica	2007	3	2	1	0	8	0	8	CONCACAF
Japan	1991	18	8	3	7	23	24	-1	AFC
Mexico	1998	17	15	0	2	68	10	58	CONCACAF
Netherlands	1988	8	3	4	1	11	9	2	UEFA
New Zealand	2007	8	4	2	2	14	4	10	OFC
Nicaragua	2023	1	1	0	0	4	0	4	CONCACAF
Nigeria	1999	3	3	0	0	8	4	4	CAF
North Korea	2008	2	2	0	0	4	1	3	AFC
Norway	1988	10	5	2	3	19	13	6	UEFA
Panama	2023	2	2	0	0	9	0	9	CONCACAF
Paraguay	2006	6	6	0	0	23	3	20	CONMEBOL
Peru	1998	4	4	0	0	26	0	26	CONMEBOL
Poland	2019	1	1	0	0	3	1	2	UEFA
Portugal	2012	3	3	0	0	12	1	11	UEFA
Puerto Rico	2024	1	1	0	0	1	0	1	CONCACAF
Russia	1996	6	4	2	0	16	2	14	UEFA
Scotland	1996	5	4	0	1	21	3	18	UEFA
South Africa	2016	3	2	1	0	9	0	9	CAF
South Korea	1999	6	5	0	1	16	4	12	AFC
Spain	2015	6	3	1	2	9	8	1	UEFA
Sweden	1991	11	5	2	4	15	12	3	UEFA
Switzerland	2015	1	1	0	0	4	1	3	UEFA
Thailand	1988	1	1	0	0	9	0	9	AFC
Trinidad and Tobago	2000	2	2	0	0	22	0	22	CONCACAF
Ukraine	1996	1	1	0	0	7	0	7	UEFA
Uruguay	2006	6	5	1	0	22	1	21	CONMEBOL
United States	1986	45	5	5	35	32	95	-63	CONCACAF
Venezuela	1991	11	10	0	1	52	4	48	CONMEBOL
Zambia	2021	2	2	0	0	7	1	6	CAF
Total (53 nations)	1986	404	240	61	105	1043	397	646	All

== Coaching staff ==
=== Current coaching staff ===
Position	Name	Ref.
Head coach	(Brazil) Arthur Elias	
Assistant coaches	(Brazil) Rodrigo Iglesias	
Assistant coaches	(Brazil) Roseli	
Goalkeeping coach	(Brazil) Edson Júnior	
Fitness coach	(Brazil) Marcelo Rossetti	

=== Manager history ===
- Updated on 13 October 2026, after the match against Argentina.

Name	Period	P	W	D	L	Win %	Notes
(Brazil) João Varella	1986–1988	8	3	2	3	37.50	
(Brazil) Edil	1991	2	2	0	0	100.00	
(Brazil) Lula Paiva	1991	0	0	0	0	—	Only managed unofficial matches in 1991
(Brazil) Fernando Pires	1991	3	1	0	2	33.33	
(Brazil) Ademar Fonseca	1995	13	8	0	5	61.54	
(Brazil) Ricardo Vágner (interim)	1995	0	0	0	0	—	Replaced manager Ademar Fonseca for just one match, an unofficial friendly
(Brazil) José Duarte	1996–1998	30	19	4	7	63.33	
(Brazil) Wilsinho	1999	13	7	2	4	53.85	
(Brazil) José Duarte	2000	11	5	1	5	45.45	
(Brazil) Paulo Gonçalves	2001–2003	18	10	3	5	55.56	
(Brazil) René Simões	2004	7	4	0	3	57.14	
(Brazil) Luiz Antônio	September 2004 – September 2006	0	0	0	0	—	Only managed unofficial matches in 2005
(Brazil) José Teixeira	October 2006 – November 2006	0	0	0	0	—	Only managed three unofficial matches, where the team consisted of players of the FPF
(Brazil) Jorge Barcellos	November 2006–30 August 2008	34	23	2	9	67.65	
(Brazil) Kleiton Lima	September 2008–23 November 2011	28	21	6	1	75.00	
(Brazil) Jorge Barcellos	23 November 2011 – 23 November 2012	13	7	0	6	53.85	
(Brazil) Márcio Oliveira	23 November 2012 – 14 April 2014	21	10	7	4	47.62	
(Brazil) Vadão	14 April 2014 – 1 November 2016	34	25	5	4	73.53	
(Portugal) Emily Lima	1 November 2016 – 22 September 2017	13	7	1	5	53.85	
(Brazil) Vadão	25 September 2017 – 22 July 2019	22	10	0	12	45.45	
(Sweden) Pia Sundhage	24 July 2019 – 30 August 2023	57	34	13	10	59.65	
(Brazil) Arthur Elias	1 September 2023 – present	53	34	6	13	64.15	

== Players ==
=== Current squad ===
The following 26 players were named in the squad for the friendly matches against Japan on 29 November and 5 December 2026.
Caps and goals correct as of 13 October 2026, after the match against Argentina.

No.	Pos.	Player	Date of birth (age)	Caps	Goals	Club
	GK	Lorena	6 May 1997 (age 29)	45	0	(United States Soccer Federation) Kansas City Current
	GK	Letícia Izidoro	13 August 1994 (age 32)	32	0	(Brazilian Football Confederation) Corinthians
	GK	Natascha Honegger	27 November 1997 (age 28)	5	0	(Brazilian Football Confederation) Palmeiras
	DF	Lauren	13 September 2002 (age 24)	33	1	(Royal Spanish Football Federation) Atlético Madrid
	DF	Tarciane	27 May 2003 (age 23)	30	2	(French Football Federation) OL Lyonnes
	DF	Thaís Ferreira	1 May 1996 (age 30)	24	0	(Brazilian Football Confederation) Corinthians
	DF	Isa Haas	20 January 2001 (age 25)	23	2	(Mexican Football Federation) América
	DF	Tayla	9 May 1992 (age 34)	23	1	(Brazilian Football Confederation) São Paulo
	DF	Mariza	8 November 2001 (age 25)	22	1	(Mexican Football Federation) UANL
	DF	Aline Gomes	7 July 2005 (age 21)	12	1	(Mexican Football Federation) Pachuca
	DF	Raíssa Bahia	27 August 2003 (age 23)	4	1	(Brazilian Football Confederation) Palmeiras
	MF	Ary Borges	28 December 1999 (age 26)	53	9	(United States Soccer Federation) Angel City
	MF	Duda Sampaio	18 May 2001 (age 25)	53	4	(Brazilian Football Confederation) Corinthians
	MF	Angelina	26 January 2000 (age 26)	50	4	(United States Soccer Federation) Orlando Pride
	MF	Vitória Yaya	23 January 2000 (age 26)	20	1	(French Football Federation) Paris Saint-Germain
	MF	Kaylane	8 December 2008 (age 17)	3	0	(Brazilian Football Confederation) Flamengo
	FW	Adriana	17 November 1996 (age 30)	73	17	(Saudi Arabian Football Federation) Al Qadsiah
	FW	Geyse	27 March 1998 (age 28)	59	9	(Mexican Football Federation) América
	FW	Gio Garbelini	21 June 2003 (age 23)	34	6	(Royal Spanish Football Federation) Atlético Madrid
	FW	Luany	3 February 2003 (age 23)	17	5	(Royal Spanish Football Federation) Atlético Madrid
	FW	Amanda Gutierres	18 March 2001 (age 25)	13	9	(United States Soccer Federation) Boston Legacy
	FW	Taina Maranhão	18 August 2004 (age 22)	12	4	(Brazilian Football Confederation) Palmeiras
	FW	Priscila	22 August 2004 (age 22)	11	1	(Mexican Football Federation) América
	FW	Marília	27 January 2003 (age 23)	6	0	(Brazilian Football Confederation) Cruzeiro
	FW	Evelin	8 April 2008 (age 18)	2	0	(Brazilian Football Confederation) Santos
	FW	Gisele	20 May 2007 (age 19)	0	0	(Brazilian Football Confederation) Grêmio

=== Recent call ups ===
The following players have also been called up to the squad within the past 12 months.

Pos.	Player	Date of birth (age)	Caps	Goals	Club	Latest call-up
GK	Thaís Lima	11 April 2008 (age 18)	3	0	(Portugal) Benfica	v. Argentina, 13 October 2026
GK	Carlinha	4 June 1997 (age 29)	1	0	(Brazil) São Paulo	v. Argentina, 13 October 2026
GK	Yanne	7 January 2003 (age 23)	0	0	(Brazil) Bahia	v. Argentina, 13 October 2026
GK	Camila	2 January 2001 (age 25)	2	0	(Brazil) Cruzeiro	Training camp, 15–20 June 2026
GK	Ana Morganti	30 November 2008 (age 17)	0	0	(Brazil) Corinthians	Training camp, 15–20 June 2026
GK	Kemelli	13 March 1999 (age 27)	0	0	(Brazil) Fluminense	Training camp, 15–20 June 2026
GK	Nicole	13 April 2000 (age 26)	0	0	(Brazil) Corinthians	Training camp, 15–20 June 2026
GK	Cláudia	22 July 2002 (age 24)	3	0	(Brazil) Cruzeiro	v. Mexico, 7 March 2026
DF	Isabela Chagas	23 July 2001 (age 25)	8	1	(France) Paris Saint-Germain	v. Japan, 29 November 2026 ^{INJ}
DF	Tamara Bolt	12 May 2003 (age 23)	2	0	(United States) Washington Spirit	v. Argentina, 13 October 2026
DF	Carol Gil	30 December 2003 (age 22)	1	0	(Brazil) São Paulo	v. Argentina, 13 October 2026
DF	Bruninha	16 June 2002 (age 24)	24	0	(United States) Gotham FC	v. Argentina, 13 October 2026 ^{INJ}
DF	Kathellen	26 April 1996 (age 30)	31	1	(Saudi Arabia) Al-Nassr	Training camp, 15–20 June 2026
DF	Fe Palermo	18 August 1996 (age 30)	29	1	(Brazil) Palmeiras	Training camp, 15–20 June 2026
DF	Tainara	21 April 1999 (age 27)	25	0	(Brazil) Cruzeiro	Training camp, 15–20 June 2026
DF	Ivana Fuso	12 March 2001 (age 25)	4	0	(Brazil) Corinthians	Training camp, 15–20 June 2026
DF	Paloma Maciel	23 August 1999 (age 27)	3	0	(Brazil) Cruzeiro	Training camp, 15–20 June 2026
DF	Rafaelle Souza	18 June 1991 (age 35)	85	9	(United States) Orlando Pride	v. United States, 9 June 2026
DF	Yasmim	28 October 1996 (age 30)	40	6	Unattached	v. Canada, 18 April 2026
DF	Vitória Calhau	5 June 2000 (age 26)	6	1	(Brazil) Cruzeiro	v. Canada, 18 April 2026
DF	Gi Fernandes	23 December 2004 (age 21)	1	0	(Brazil) Corinthians	v. Canada, 18 April 2026
DF	Tamires	10 October 1987 (age 39)	154	7	(Brazil) Corinthians	v. Mexico, 7 March 2026
MF	Maiara Niehues	11 August 2004 (age 22)	5	0	(United States) Angel City	v. Argentina, 13 October 2026
MF	Clarinha	16 January 2006 (age 20)	2	0	(Portugal) Benfica	v. Argentina, 13 October 2026
MF	Andressa Alves	10 November 1992 (age 34)	106	23	(Brazil) Corinthians	Training camp, 15–20 June 2026
MF	Ana Vitória	6 March 2000 (age 26)	27	1	(Brazil) Corinthians	Training camp, 15–20 June 2026
MF	Gabi Zanotti	28 February 1985 (age 41)	49	6	(Brazil) Corinthians	v. Mexico, 7 March 2026
MF	Luana	2 May 1993 (age 33)	39	2	Unattached	v. Mexico, 7 March 2026
MF	Brena	28 October 1996 (age 30)	5	0	(Brazil) Palmeiras	v. Mexico, 7 March 2026
FW	Bia Zaneratto	17 December 1993 (age 32)	133	45	(Brazil) Palmeiras	v. Japan, 29 November 2026 ^{INJ}
FW	Kerolin	17 November 1999 (age 27)	63	15	(Spain) Barcelona	v. Argentina, 13 October 2026
FW	Jaqueline	31 March 2000 (age 26)	10	2	(Brazil) Corinthians	v. Argentina, 13 October 2026
FW	Jhonson	13 October 2005 (age 21)	7	1	(Brazil) Corinthians	v. Argentina, 13 October 2026
FW	Jheniffer	6 November 2001 (age 25)	14	5	(Mexico) UANL	Training camp, 15–20 June 2026
FW	Marta	19 February 1986 (age 40)	201	121	(United States) Orlando Pride	v. United States, 9 June 2026
FW	Ludmila	1 December 1994 (age 31)	67	7	(United States) San Diego Wave	v. United States, 9 June 2026
FW	Gabi Portilho	18 July 1995 (age 31)	38	4	(United States) San Diego Wave	v. United States, 9 June 2026
FW	Dudinha	4 July 2005 (age 21)	19	6	(United States) San Diego Wave	v. United States, 9 June 2026
^{INJ} Player withdrew from the squad due to injury; ^{RET} Player retired from the national team; ^{SUS} Player served suspension; ^{WD} Player withdrew from the squad due to non-injury issue; ^{EXP} Player expelled from squad

== Records ==
As of 9 June 2026

Players in bold are still active with the national team.

=== Most appearances ===
Rank	Player	Career	Caps	Goals
1	Formiga	1995–2021	217	34
2	**Marta**	2003–present	201	121
3	**Cristiane**	2003–present	158	94
4	**Tamires**	2013–present	156	7
5	**Debinha**	2011–present	148	62
6	**Bia Zaneratto**	2011–present	132	43
7	Rosana Augusto	2000–2017	118	18
8	**Andressa Alves**	2012–present	106	24
9	**Rafaelle**	2011–present	102	9
10	Andréia Suntaque	1999–2015	98	0

=== Top goalscorers ===
Rank	Player	Career	Goals	Caps	Avg.
1	**Marta**	2003–present	121	201	0.60
2	**Cristiane**	2003–present	94	158	0.59
3	Pretinha	1991–2014	67	85	0.79
4	**Debinha**	2011–present	62	148	0.42
5	Roseli	1988–2004	58	63	0.92
6	Sissi	1988–2000	55	68	0.81
7	Kátia Cilene	1995–2007	45	60	0.75
8	**Bia Zaneratto**	2011–present	43	132	0.33
9	Formiga	1995–2021	34	217	0.16
10	**Andressa Alves**	2012–present	24	106	0.23

== Competitive record ==
=== FIFA Women's World Cup ===
FIFA Women's World Cup record										Qualification record					
Year	Result	Position	Pld	W	D	L	GF	GA	Squad	Pld	W	D	L	GF	GA
(China) 1991	Group stage	9th	3	1	0	2	1	7	Squad	Via Copa América Femenina					
(Sweden) 1995	Group stage	9th	3	1	0	2	3	8	Squad	Via Copa América Femenina					
(United States) 1999	Third place	3rd	6	3	2	1	16	9	Squad	Via Copa América Femenina					
(United States) 2003	Quarter-finals	5th	4	2	1	1	9	4	Squad	Via Copa América Femenina					
(China) 2007	Runners-up	2nd	6	5	0	1	17	4	Squad	Via Copa América Femenina					
(Germany) 2011	Quarter-finals	5th	4	3	1	0	9	2	Squad	Via Copa América Femenina					
(Canada) 2015	Round of 16	9th	4	3	0	1	4	1	Squad	Via Copa América Femenina					
(France) 2019	Round of 16	10th	4	2	0	2	7	5	Squad	Via Copa América Femenina					
(Australia) (New Zealand) 2023	Group stage	18th	3	1	1	1	5	2	Squad	Via Copa América Femenina					
(Brazil) 2027	Qualified as host									Qualified as host					
(Costa Rica) (Jamaica) (Mexico) (United States) 2031	To be determined									To be determined					
(United Kingdom) 2035	To be determined									To be determined					
Total	Runners-up	10/10	37	21	5	11	71	42		0	0	0	0	0	0

FIFA Women's World Cup history
Year	Round	Date	Opponent	Result	Stadium
(China) 1991	Group stage	17 November	Japan	W 1–0	New Plaza Stadium, Foshan
(China) 1991	Group stage	19 November	United States	L 0–5	Ying Dong Stadium, Panyu
(China) 1991	Group stage	21 November	Sweden	L 0–2	Ying Dong Stadium, Panyu
(Sweden) 1995	Group stage	5 June	Sweden	W 1–0	Olympia Stadion, Helsingborg
(Sweden) 1995	Group stage	7 June	Japan	L 1–2	Tingvallen, Karlstad
(Sweden) 1995	Group stage	9 June	Germany	L 1–6	Tingvallen, Karlstad
(United States) 1999	Group stage	19 June	Mexico	W 7–1	Giants Stadium, East Rutherford
(United States) 1999	Group stage	24 June	Italy	W 2–0	Soldier Field, Chicago
(United States) 1999	Group stage	27 June	Germany	D 3–3	Jack Kent Cooke Stadium, Landover
(United States) 1999	Quarter-finals	1 July	Nigeria	W 4–3 (a.e.t.)	Jack Kent Cooke Stadium, Landover
(United States) 1999	Semi-finals	4 July	United States	L 0–2	Stanford Stadium, Stanford
(United States) 1999	Third place play-off	10 July	Norway	D 0–0 (5–4 (p))	Rose Bowl, Pasadena
(United States) 2003	Group stage	21 September	South Korea	W 3–0	RFK Stadium, Washington, D.C.
(United States) 2003	Group stage	24 September	Norway	W 4–1	RFK Stadium, Washington, D.C.
(United States) 2003	Group stage	27 September	France	D 1–1	RFK Stadium, Washington, D.C.
(United States) 2003	Quarter-finals	1 October	Sweden	L 1–2	Gillette Stadium, Foxborough
(China) 2007	Group stage	12 September	New Zealand	W 5–0	Wuhan Stadium, Wuhan
(China) 2007	Group stage	15 September	China	W 4–0	Wuhan Stadium, Wuhan
(China) 2007	Group stage	20 September	Denmark	W 1–0	Yellow Dragon Sports Center, Hangzhou
(China) 2007	Quarter-finals	23 September	Australia	W 3–2	Tianjin Olympic Centre Stadium, Tianjin
(China) 2007	Semi-finals	27 September	United States	W 4–0	Yellow Dragon Sports Center, Hangzhou
(China) 2007	Final	30 September	Germany	L 0–2	Hongkou Stadium, Shanghai
(Germany) 2011	Group stage	29 June	Australia	W 1–0	Borussia-Park, Mönchengladbach
(Germany) 2011	Group stage	3 July	Norway	W 3–0	Volkswagen-Arena, Wolfsburg
(Germany) 2011	Group stage	6 July	Equatorial Guinea	W 3–0	Commerzbank-Arena, Frankfurt
(Germany) 2011	Quarter-finals	10 July	United States	D 2–2 (3–5 (p))	Rudolf-Harbig-Stadion, Dresden
(Canada) 2015	Group stage	9 June	South Korea	W 2–0	Olympic Stadium, Montreal
(Canada) 2015	Group stage	13 June	Spain	W 1–0	Olympic Stadium, Montreal
(Canada) 2015	Group stage	17 June	Costa Rica	W 1–0	Moncton Stadium, Moncton
(Canada) 2015	Round of 16	21 June	Australia	L 0–1	Moncton Stadium, Moncton
(France) 2019	Group stage	9 June	Jamaica	W 3–0	Stade des Alpes, Grenoble
(France) 2019	Group stage	13 June	Australia	L 2–3	Stade de la Mosson, Montpellier
(France) 2019	Group stage	18 June	Italy	W 1–0	Stade du Hainaut, Valenciennes
(France) 2019	Round of 16	23 June	France	L 1–2 (a.e.t.)	Stade Océane, Le Havre
(Australia) (New Zealand) 2023	Group stage	24 July	Panama	W 4–0	Hindmarsh Stadium, Adelaide
(Australia) (New Zealand) 2023	Group stage	29 July	France	L 1–2	Lang Park, Brisbane
(Australia) (New Zealand) 2023	Group stage	2 August	Jamaica	D 0–0	Melbourne Rectangular Stadium, Melbourne
(Brazil) 2027	To be determined				

=== Olympic Games ===
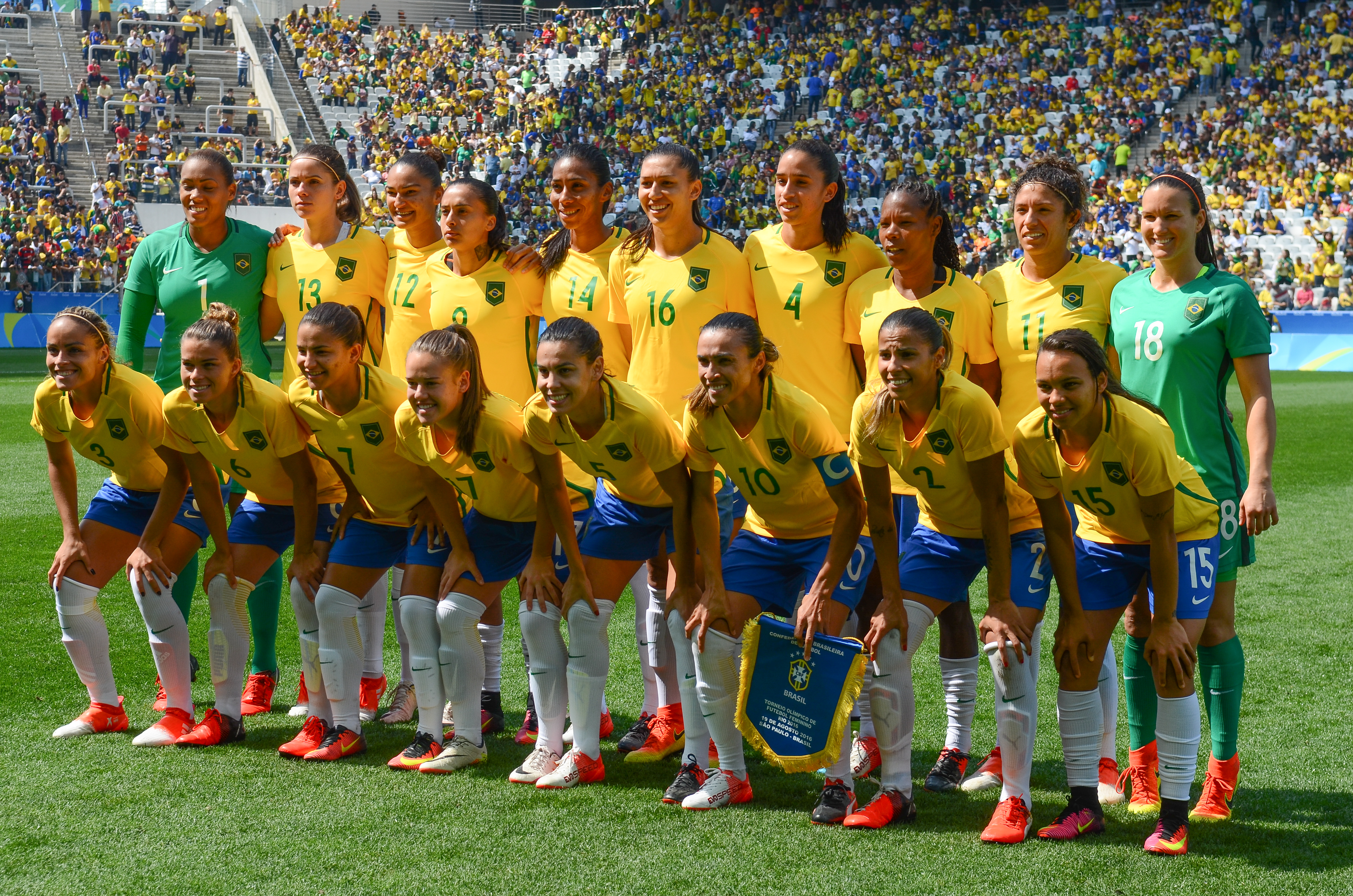
Brazil at the 2016 Olympics

Olympic Games record
Year	Result	Position	Pld	W	D	L	GF	GA	Squad
(United States) 1996	Fourth place	4th	5	1	2	2	7	8	Squad
(Australia) 2000	Fourth place	4th	5	2	0	3	5	6	Squad
(Greece) 2004	Silver medalists	2nd	6	4	0	2	15	4	Squad
(China) 2008	Silver medalists	2nd	6	4	1	1	11	5	Squad
(United Kingdom) 2012	Quarter-finals	6th	4	2	0	2	6	3	Squad
(Brazil) 2016	Fourth place	4th	6	2	3	1	9	3	Squad
(Japan) 2020	Quarter-finals	6th	4	2	2	0	9	3	Squad
(France) 2024	Silver medalists	2nd	6	3	0	3	7	7	Squad
(United States) 2028	Qualified								
Total	3 Silver medals	9/9	42	20	8	14	69	39	

=== Copa América Feminina ===
Copa América Femenina record
Year	Result	Position	Pld	W	D*	L	GF	GA
(Brazil) 1991	Champions	1st	2	2	0	0	12	1
(Brazil) 1995	Champions	1st	5	5	0	0	44	1
(Argentina) 1998	Champions	1st	6	6	0	0	66	3
(Peru) (Ecuador) (Argentina) 2003	Champions	1st	3	3	0	0	18	2
(Argentina) 2006	Runners-up	2nd	7	6	0	1	30	4
(Ecuador) 2010	Champions	1st	7	7	0	0	25	2
(Ecuador) 2014	Champions	1st	7	5	1	1	22	3
(Chile) 2018	Champions	1st	7	7	0	0	31	2
(Colombia) 2022	Champions	1st	6	6	0	0	20	0
(Ecuador) 2025	Champions	1st	6	4	2	0	21	6
Total	9 Titles	10/10	56	51	3	2	289	24

=== CONCACAF W Gold Cup ===
CONCACAF W Gold Cup record
Year	Result	Position	Pld	W	D	L	GF	GA
(United States) 2024	Runners-up	2nd	6	5	0	1	15	2
Total	Runners-up		6	5	0	1	15	2

=== CONCACAF W Championship ===
CONCACAF W Championship record
Year	Result	Position	Pld	W	D	L	GF	GA
(United States) 2000	Runners-up	2nd	5	3	1	1	22	3
Total	Runners-up		5	3	1	1	22	3

=== Women's Finalissima ===
Women's Finalissima record
Year	Round	Position	P	W	D*	L	GF	GA
(England) 2023	Runners-up	2nd	1	0	1	0	1	1
2026	To be determined							
Total	Runners-up	1/1	1	0	1	0	1	1

=== Pan American Games ===
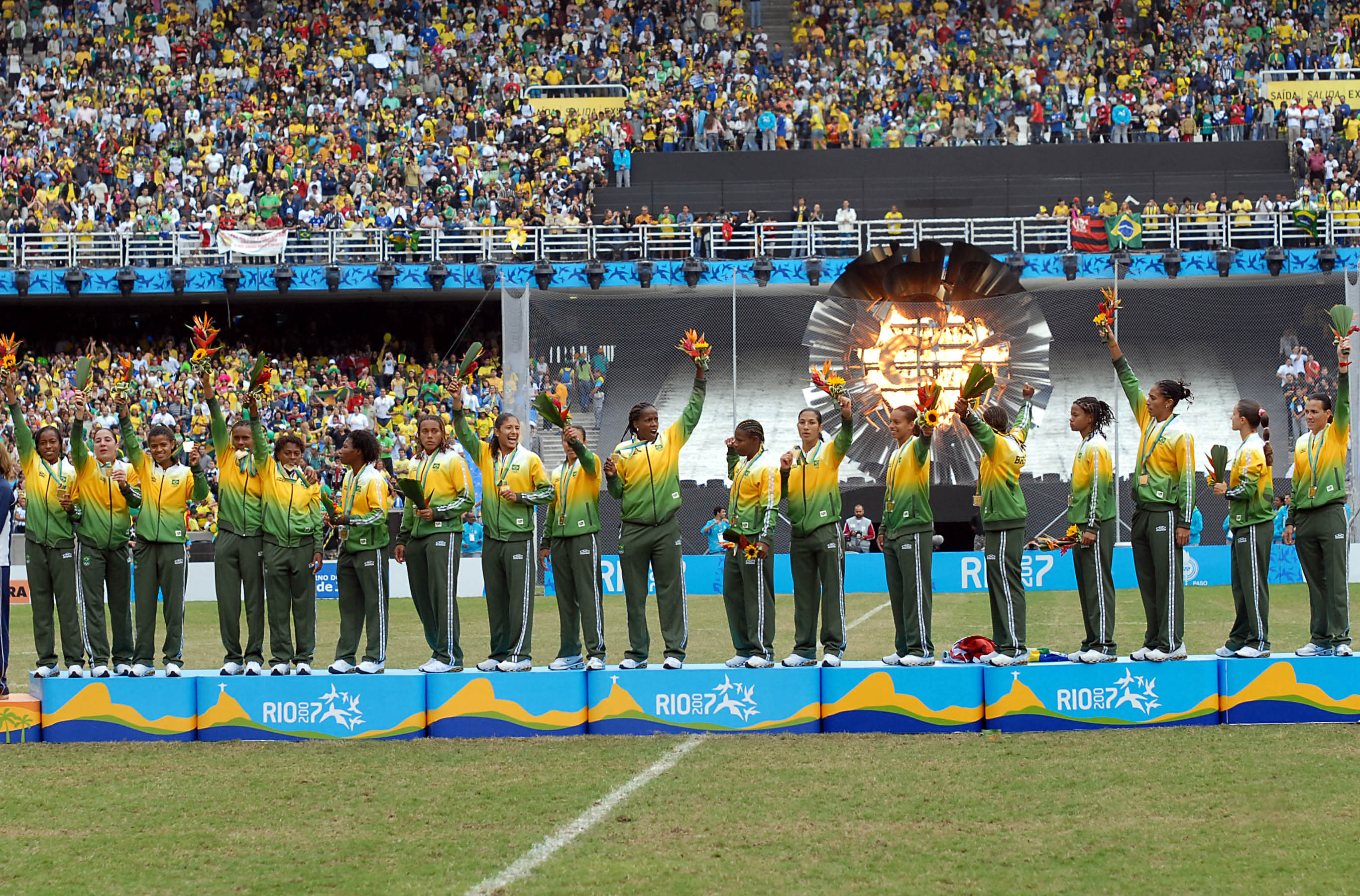
Brazil’s gold medalist squad at the 2007 Pan American Games.

Pan American Games record
Year	Result	Position	Pld	W	D	L	GF	GA	Squad
(Canada) 1999	Did not enter								
(Dominican Republic) 2003	Gold medalists	1st	4	4	0	0	14	2	Squad
(Brazil) 2007	Gold medalists	1st	6	6	0	0	33	0	Squad
(Mexico) 2011	Silver medalists	2nd	5	3	2	0	6	2	Squad
(Canada) 2015	Gold medalists	1st	5	5	0	0	20	3	Squad
(Peru) 2019	Qualified to the Olympic Games (Note: Since the 2019 edition, the slots for the Pan American Games are for the teams classified from third to fifth in the Copa América Femenina.)								
(Chile) 2023	Qualified to the Olympic Games								
(Peru) 2027	Qualified to the Olympic Games								
Total	3 Gold medals	4/8	20	18	2	0	73	7	

=== South American Games ===
South American Games record
Year	Result	Pld	W	D	L	GF	GA
(Chile) 2014	Bronze medalists	5	3	2	0	9	1
(Bolivia) 2018 to present	U-20 tournament, see Brazil women's national under-20 football team						
Total	1 Bronze medal	5	3	2	0	9	1

=== Algarve Cup ===
The Algarve Cup is an invitational tournament for national teams in women's association football hosted by the Portuguese Football Federation (FPF). Held annually in the Algarve region of Portugal since 1994, it is one of the most prestigious and longest-running women's international football events and has been nicknamed the "Mini FIFA Women's World Cup".

(Portugal) Algarve Cup record
Year	Result	Matches	Wins	Draws	Losses	GF	GA	Coach
2015	Seventh place	4	2	1	1	7	4	(Brazil) Vadão
2016	Runners-up	4	3	0	1	8	3	(Brazil) Vadão
Total	2/28	8	5	1	2	15	7	—

=== SheBelieves Cup ===
The SheBelieves Cup is a global invitational tournament for national teams in women's football hosted in the United States.

(United States) SheBelieves Cup record
Year	Result	Matches	Wins	Draws	Losses	GF	GA	Coach
2019	Fourth place	3	0	0	3	2	6	(Brazil) Vadão
2021	Runners-up	3	2	0	1	6	3	(Sweden) Pia Sundhage
2023	Third place	3	1	0	2	2	4	(Sweden) Pia Sundhage
2024	Third place	2	0	2	0	2	2	(Brazil) Arthur Elias
Total	4/10	11	3	2	6	12	15	—

=== Tournament of Nations ===
The Tournament of Nations was a global invitational tournament for national teams in women's football hosted in the United States in non-World Cup and non-Olympic years.

(United States) Tournament of Nations record
Year	Result	Matches	Wins	Draws	Losses	GF	GA	Coach
2017	Fourth place	3	0	1	2	5	11	(Brazil) (Portugal) Emily Lima
2018	Third place	3	1	0	2	4	8	(Brazil) Vadão
Total	2/2	6	1	1	4	9	19	—

=== Torneio Internacional de Futebol Feminino ===
(Brazil) Torneio Internacional de Futebol Feminino record
Year	Result	Position	Matches	Wins	Draws	Losses	GF	GA
(Brazil) 2009	Champions	1st	4	4	0	0	14	5
(Brazil) 2010	Runners-up	2nd	4	2	2	0	8	4
(Brazil) 2011	Champions	1st	4	3	0	1	11	3
(Brazil) 2012	Champions	1st	4	2	1	1	9	5
(Brazil) 2013	Champions	1st	4	3	1	0	10	1
(Brazil) 2014	Champions	1st	4	3	1	0	11	3
(Brazil) 2015	Champions	1st	4	4	0	0	22	2
(Brazil) 2016	Champions	1st	4	4	0	0	18	4
(Brazil) 2019	Runners-up	2nd	2	1	1	0	5	0
(Brazil) 2021	Champions	1st	3	3	0	0	12	2
Total	8 Titles	10/10	37	29	6	2	120	29

== Honours ==
=== Major competitions ===
- FIFA Women's World Cup
  - (silver) Runners-up (1): 2007
  - (bronze) Third place (1): 1999
- Olympic Games
  - (silver) Silver medalists (3): 2004, 2008, 2024
- Copa América Femenina
  - (gold) Champions (9): 1991, 1995, 1998, 2003, 2010, 2014, 2018, 2022, 2025
  - (silver) Runners-up (1): 2006
- CONCACAF W Championship
  - (silver) Runners-up (1): 2000
- CONCACAF W Gold Cup
  - (silver) Runners-up (1): 2024
- Women's Finalissima
  - (silver) Runners-up (1): 2023

=== Others competitions ===
Intercontinental

- Pan American Games
  - (gold) Gold medalists (3): 2003, 2007, 2015
  - (silver) Silver medalists (1): 2011

Continental

- South American Games
  - (bronze) Bronze medalists (1): 2014

=== Friendly ===
- 2026 FIFA Women's Series
  - (gold) Champions (1): 2026
- FIFA Women's Invitation Tournament
- (bronze) Third-place 1988
- Torneio Internacional de Futebol Feminino
  - Champions (8): 2009, 2011, 2012, 2013, 2014, 2015, 2016, 2021
  - Runners-up (2): 2010, 2019
- Matchworld Women's Cup
  - Champions (1): 2012
- Yongchuan International Tournament
  - Champions (1): 2017

== See also ==
- Sport in Brazil
  - Football in Brazil
    - Women's football in Brazil
- Brazilian Football Confederation
- Brazil women's national under-20 football team
- Brazil women's national under-17 football team
- Brazil women's national futsal team
- Brazil men's national football team

Sporting positions
Preceded by Inaugural Champions	South American Champions; 1991 (First title); 1995 (Second title); 1998 (Third title); 2003 (Fourth title)	Succeeded by 2006 Argentina
Preceded by 2006 Argentina	South American Champions; 2010 (Fifth title); 2014 (Sixth title)	Succeeded by Incumbents
