= Sociedade Esportiva Kindermann =

Kindermann
- Full name: Sociedade Esportiva Kindermann
- Founded: 23 August 1975; 50 years ago
- Dissolved: 19 June 2023; 2 years ago (officially by CBF)
- Ground: Estádio Salézio Kindermann
- Capacity: 6,500
Home colours	Away colours

Sociedade Esportiva Kindermann, commonly known as Kindermann, was a Brazilian football club based in Caçador, Santa Catarina.

== History ==
The club was founded on 23 August 1975 with the name Grêmio Recreativo Esportivo Kindermann, by Salézio Kindermann, a businessman in the hotel industry. Under the name Associação Caçadorense de Desportos, the club played men's football until 1995, when in 1996, it also began to dedicate to the development of women's football in the state, changing its name to Sociedade Esportiva Kindermann.

In women's football, the club dominated the Santa Catarina championship from 2008 onwards, being champion 13 times in a row, as well as winning the Copa do Brasil in 2015. In 2016, however, the project was shaken when the team's coach, Josué Kaercher, was murdered inside the club's training ground by Carlos Corrêa, the futsal team's coach who had been fired and committed such an act out of revenge.

Starting in 25 February 2019, the club partnered with Avaí FC, subsequently renaming itself Avaí/Kindermann or Kindermann/Avaí. After 18 November 2021, the Kindermann family relinquished control of the club, which became wholly owned by Avaí. Avaí's women's club remained known as Avaí/Kindermann by having inherited the club's position in the Brazilian Championship until 19 June 2023, when CBF accepted the full incorporation of SE Kindermann by Avaí Futebol Clube.

== Stadium ==
The club played at Caçador city municipal stadium, named Estádio Dr. Carlos Alberto da Costa Neves, with a capacity of 6,500. In 2022, the stadium was renamed in honor of Salézio Kindermann, founder of SE Kindermann, who died of COVID-19 on 16 May 2021.

== Appearances ==
Kindermann competed in the Campeonato Catarinense from 1977 to 1981. On 15 January 1978, it changed its name to Associação Caçadorense de Desportes. The club also played in the state's second division from 1986 to 1989, when it was champion, and in the first division from 1990 to 1995 and in 1999 and 2000, totaling 12 seasons at the first level of state football.

== Honours ==
=== Official tournaments ===
State
Competitions	Titles	Seasons
Campeonato Catarinense Série B	1	1989

=== Women's football ===
- Copa do Brasil (1): 2015
- Campeonato Catarinense (13): 2009, 2009, 2010, 2011, 2012, 2013, 2014, 2015, 2017, 2018, 2019*, 2021*, 2022*

*: Won as Avaí/Kindermann
