= Thiago Viana =

Brazilian football manager (born 1989)

Personal information
- Full name: Thiago Viana dos Santos
- Date of birth: 29 May 1989 (age 37)
- Place of birth: São Paulo, Brazil

Team information
- Current team: São Paulo (women) (head coach)

Managerial career
- Years: Team
- 2017–2022: São Paulo (women) (youth)
- 2023–: São Paulo (women)

Thiago Viana dos Santos (born 29 May 1989) is a Brazilian football coach, currently the head coach of São Paulo's women's team.

== Career ==
A graduate in physical education from USP, Viana worked at several football schools in the city of São Paulo, in addition to the Centro Olímpico. In 2017, he was hired to command the under-16 team of São Paulo FC, leading the under-18 and under-20 categories in the following years. In December 2022, after the dismissal of Lucas Piccinato, he took over the command of the women's main team.

In March 2025 Viana won his first professional title, the Supercopa do Brasil.

== Honours ==
São Paulo

- Supercopa do Brasil de Futebol Feminino: 2025
- Campeonato Brasileiro Série A1: 2026

São Paulo (youth)

- Campeonato Brasileiro Feminino Sub-18: 2021
- Campeonato Brasileiro Feminino Sub-16: 2019
- Campeonato Paulista de Futebol Feminino Sub-17: 2017, 2018, 2019, 2021, 2022
- Liga de Desenvolvimento Sub-16: 2017, 2018
- Fiesta CONMEBOL Evolución Sub-16: 2018
- Nike Premier Cup Sub-17: 2019, 2021, 2022
- Copa Ouro Feminina Sub-23: 2022
