= Carol Gil =

Brazilian footballer

Personal information
- Full name: Carolini Torresilha Monteiro Gil
- Date of birth: 30 December 2003 (age 22)
- Place of birth: Cosmorama, Brazil
- Height: 1.70 m (5 ft 7 in)
- Position: Left back

Team information
- Current team: São Paulo
- Number: 16

Youth career
- 2018–2023: Internacional

Senior career*
Years	Team	Apps	(Gls)
2023	Internacional	5	(0)
2023–	São Paulo	52	(12)
- * Club domestic league appearances and goals as of 20 October 2025

Carolini Torresilha Monteiro Gil (born 30 December 2003), better known as Carol Gil, is a Brazilian professional women's footballer who plays as a left back for São Paulo.

== Career ==
Born in Cosmorama, São Paulo, Gil trained as a youth player at SC Internacional, where she was twice U-20 champion and promoted to the main team in 2023. In July of the same year, she was signed by São Paulo FC where she gained space year after year, especially for the goals scored.

== Honours ==
São Paulo

- Campeonato Brasileiro Série A1: 2026
- Supercopa do Brasil: 2025

Internacional U20

- Campeonato Brasileiro Feminino Sub-20: 2022, 2023
