= 2026 Campeonato Brasileiro de Futebol Feminino Série A1 =

14th season of the Campeonato Brasileiro de Futebol Feminino

Campeonato Brasileiro de Futebol Feminino Série A1
- Season: 2026
- Dates: 12 February – 3 October 2026
- Teams: 18
- Champions: São Paulo (1st title)
- Relegated: Botafogo; Vitória
- Copa Libertadores: Corinthians; São Paulo
- Matches: 167
- Goals: 434 (2.6 per match)
- Top goalscorer: Marília (11 goals)
- Biggest home win: Palmeiras 6–0 Vitória; Group stage, R4, 22 March
- Biggest away win: Botafogo 1–5 São Paulo; Group stage, R16, 16 August
- Highest scoring: 8 goals Red Bull Bragantino 6–2 Vitória; Group stage, R16, 15 August
- Longest winning run: 7 matches Corinthians; São Paulo
- Longest unbeaten run: 14 matches Palmeiras
- Longest winless run: 16 matches Botafogo
- Longest losing run: 11 matches Botafogo
- Highest attendance: 49,405; São Paulo 1–1 Corinthians; Finals, 2nd leg, 3 October
- Lowest attendance: 20; Bahia 3–1 Atlético Mineiro; Group stage, R6, 1 April
- Total attendance: 133,506
- Average attendance: 1,535

The 2026 Campeonato Brasileiro Feminino A1 was the 14th season of the Campeonato Brasileiro de Futebol Feminino Série A1, the top level of women's football in Brazil, and the 10th edition in a Série A1 since its establishment in 2016. The tournament was organized by the Brazilian Football Confederation (CBF). It started on 12 February and ended on 3 October 2026.

Corinthians were the defending champions.

== Format ==
In the group stage, each team played once against the other seventeen teams. The top eight teams qualified for the final stages. Quarter-finals, semi-finals and finals were played on a home-and-away two-legged basis.

== Teams ==
Location of teams in 2026 Série A1 outside the state of São Paulo (in red).
Location of teams in 2026 Série A1 within the state of São Paulo.

Eighteen teams competed in the league – the top fourteen teams from the previous season, as well as four teams promoted from the 2025 Série A2 (Atlético Mineiro, Botafogo, Fortaleza and Santos) On 29 December 2025, however, Fortaleza announced the end of their women's football department, and two days later, Real Brasília announced their withdrawal from the competition due to the lack of funds.

On 8 January 2026, CBF announced that Mixto and Vitória would take Fortaleza and Real Brasília's vacant spots.

Pos.	Relegated from 2025 Série A1
15th	3B da Amazônia
16th	Sport

Pos.	Promoted from 2025 Série A2
1st	Santos
2nd	Botafogo
4th	Atlético Mineiro
5th	Vitória
6th	Mixto

=== Number of teams by state ===
Number of teams	State	Team(s)
6	São Paulo	Corinthians, Ferroviária, Palmeiras, Red Bull Bragantino, Santos and São Paulo
3	Minas Gerais	América Mineiro, Atlético Mineiro and Cruzeiro
3	Rio de Janeiro	Botafogo, Flamengo and Fluminense
3	Rio Grande do Sul	Grêmio, Internacional and Juventude
2	Bahia	Bahia and Vitória
1	Mato Grosso	Mixto

== Stadiums and locations ==
Team	Location	Stadium	Capacity
(Minas Gerais) América Mineiro	Belo Horizonte	Arena Independência	23,018
(Minas Gerais) América Mineiro	Belo Horizonte	Arena Frimisa (Santa Luzia)	3,200
(Minas Gerais) América Mineiro	Belo Horizonte	Castor Cifuentes (Nova Lima)	15,000
(Minas Gerais) Atlético Mineiro	Belo Horizonte	Arena MRV	44,892
(Minas Gerais) Atlético Mineiro	Belo Horizonte	Arena do Jacaré (Sete Lagoas)	19,998
(Minas Gerais) Atlético Mineiro	Belo Horizonte	Arena Gregorão (Contagem)	4,000
Bahia	Salvador	Arena Fonte Nova	50,025
Bahia	Salvador	Pituaçu	32,158
Bahia	Salvador	Arena Cajueiro (Feira de Santana)	7,000
(Rio de Janeiro (state)) Botafogo	Rio de Janeiro	Nilton Santos	44,000
(São Paulo (state)) Corinthians	São Paulo	Parque São Jorge	18,500
(São Paulo (state)) Corinthians	São Paulo	Neo Química Arena	47,605
(São Paulo (state)) Corinthians	São Paulo	Canindé	21,004
(Minas Gerais) Cruzeiro	Belo Horizonte	Arena do Jacaré (Sete Lagoas)	19,998
(São Paulo (state)) Ferroviária	Araraquara	Fonte Luminosa	21,441
(Rio de Janeiro (state)) Flamengo	Rio de Janeiro	Luso Brasileiro	6,000
(Rio de Janeiro (state)) Fluminense	Rio de Janeiro	Luso Brasileiro	6,000
(Rio Grande do Sul) Grêmio	Porto Alegre	Francisco Novelleto Neto	10,600
(Rio Grande do Sul) Internacional	Porto Alegre	SESC Protásio Alves	2,800
(Rio Grande do Sul) Juventude	Caxias do Sul	Alfredo Jaconi	21,680
(Rio Grande do Sul) Juventude	Caxias do Sul	Homero Soldatelli (Flores da Cunha)	1,500
(Rio Grande do Sul) Juventude	Caxias do Sul	Montanha dos Vinhedos (Bento Gonçalves)	15,269
(Mato Grosso) Mixto	Cuiabá	Dutrinha	9,000
(São Paulo (state)) Palmeiras	São Paulo	Allianz Parque	43,713
(São Paulo (state)) Palmeiras	São Paulo	Arena Barueri (Barueri)	31,452
(São Paulo (state)) Red Bull Bragantino	Bragança Paulista	Cícero de Souza Marques	12,000
(São Paulo (state)) Red Bull Bragantino	Bragança Paulista	CPD Atibaia (Atibaia)	1,500
(São Paulo (state)) Red Bull Bragantino	Bragança Paulista	Benitão (Rio Claro)	8,136
(São Paulo (state)) Santos	Santos	Vila Belmiro	16,068
(São Paulo (state)) Santos	Santos	Nogueirão (Mogi das Cruzes)	14,384
(São Paulo (state)) São Paulo	São Paulo	Marcelo Portugal Gouvêa (Cotia)	2,000
(Bahia) Vitória	Salvador	Pituaçu	32,158
(Bahia) Vitória	Salvador	Barradão	34,535

== Personnel and kits ==
Team	Head coach	Captain	Kit manufacturer	Shirt main sponsor
América Mineiro	(Brazil) Jorge Victor	(Brazil) Mimi	Volt Sport	Prefeitura Municipal de Conceição do Mato Dentro
Atlético Mineiro	(Brazil) Fabiana Guedes	(Brazil) Hingredy	Nike	H2bet, Guidance
Bahia	(Brazil) Felipe Freitas	(Brazil) Cássia	Puma	Foxlux
Botafogo	(Brazil) Léo Goulart	(Brazil) Michelle Lopes	Mizuno	VBet
Corinthians	(Portugal) Emily Lima	(Brazil) Duda Sampaio	Nike	Esporte da Sorte
Cruzeiro	(Brazil) Jonas Urias	(Brazil) Byanca Brasil	Adidas	Betnacional, Neutrox
Ferroviária	(Brazil) Léo Mendes	(Brazil) Nicoly	Lupo Sport	Galera.bet, Amil, Hopi Hari
Flamengo	(Brazil) Celso Silva	(Brazil) Djeni	Adidas	Betano, Cinbal
Fluminense	(Brazil) Saulo Silva	(Brazil) Débora Sorriso	Puma	Superbet, Fecomércio RJ
Grêmio	(Brazil) Jéssica de Lima	(Brazil) Camila Pini	New Balance	
Internacional	(Brazil) Maurício Salgado	(Brazil) Sorriso	Adidas	
Juventude	(Brazil) Luciano Brandalise	(Paraguay) Limpia Fretes	19treze (club manufactured kit)	
Mixto	(Brazil) Adilson Galdino	(Brazil) Isabela Mello	Tubarão Sports	Conheça Mato Grosso
Palmeiras	(Brazil) Rosana	(Brazil) Bia Zaneratto	Puma	Sportingbet
Red Bull Bragantino	(Brazil) Humberto Simão	(Brazil) Ana Carla	Puma	Red Bull
Santos	(Brazil) Marcelo Frigerio	(Brazil) Carol Baiana	Umbro	
São Paulo	(Brazil) Thiago Viana	(Brazil) Tayla	New Balance	Superbet
Vitória	(Brazil) Rodrigo Campos	(Brazil) Mariana Pires	Volt Sport	7K, Skokka

=== Managerial changes ===
Team	Outgoing manager	Manner of departure	Date of vacancy	Position in table	Replaced by	Date of appointment
Corinthians	(Brazil) Lucas Piccinato	Sacked	21 February 2026	3rd	(Portugal) Emily Lima	24 February 2026
Grêmio	(Brazil) Cyro Leães	Sacked	16 March 2026	16th	(Brazil) Jéssica de Lima	17 March 2026
Vitória	(Brazil) Marcos Carvalho	Sacked	3 April 2026	17th	(Brazil) Rodrigo Campos ^{1}	26 June 2026
Santos	(Brazil) Caio Couto	Sacked	24 April 2026	11th	(Brazil) Marcelo Frigerio ^{2}	25 April 2026

Interim managers

1. (Brazil) Anderson Magalhães was interim manager in the 6th and 8th–12th rounds.
2. (Brazil) Bruno Barbosa was interim manager in the 8th round.

== Group stage ==
In the group stage, each team played on a single round-robin tournament. The top eight teams advanced to the quarter-finals of the knockout stages. The teams were ranked according to points (3 points for a win, 1 point for a draw, and 0 points for a loss). If tied on points, the following criteria would be used to determine the ranking: 1. Wins; 2. Goal difference; 3. Goals scored; 4. Fewest red cards; 5. Fewest yellow cards; 6. Draw in the headquarters of the Brazilian Football Confederation (Regulations Article 16).

=== Group A ===
Pos	Team	Pld	W	D	L	GF	GA	GD	Pts	Qualification or relegation
1	São Paulo	17	13	2	2	31	11	+20	41	Advance to the quarter-finals
2	Corinthians	17	12	2	3	42	18	+24	38	Advance to the quarter-finals
3	Palmeiras	17	10	6	1	32	11	+21	36	Advance to the quarter-finals
4	Ferroviária	17	8	7	2	23	14	+9	31	Advance to the quarter-finals
5	Flamengo	17	8	6	3	29	20	+9	30	Advance to the quarter-finals
6	Bahia	17	8	5	4	30	21	+9	29	Advance to the quarter-finals
7	Cruzeiro	17	7	7	3	30	19	+11	28	Advance to the quarter-finals
8	Grêmio	17	8	3	6	23	16	+7	27	Advance to the quarter-finals
9	Internacional	17	8	3	6	21	17	+4	27	
10	Red Bull Bragantino	17	8	2	7	30	26	+4	26	
11	Fluminense	17	7	5	5	23	19	+4	26	
12	Santos	17	6	5	6	22	23	−1	23	
13	Atlético Mineiro	17	4	4	9	17	25	−8	16	
14	Mixto	17	2	6	9	10	27	−17	12	
15	Juventude	17	2	5	10	9	22	−13	11	
16	América Mineiro	17	1	4	12	9	34	−25	7	
17	Vitória (R)	17	1	4	12	15	45	−30	7	Relegation to Campeonato Brasileiro Série A2
18	Botafogo (R)	17	1	2	14	10	38	−28	5	Relegation to Campeonato Brasileiro Série A2

Source: CBF
(R) Relegated

=== Positions by round ===
Team ╲ Round	1	2	3	4	5	6	7	8	9	10	11	12	13	14	15	16	17
São Paulo	4	3	6	9	5	3	3	3	2	3	3	3	2	2	2	2	1
Corinthians	8	5	10	5	4	1	1	1	1	1	1	1	1	1	1	1	2
Palmeiras	1	1	1	1	1	2	2	2	3	2	2	2	3	3	3	3	3
Ferroviária	16	11	7	10	9	9	7	9	7	8	7	4	6	4	5	4	4
Flamengo	7	2	4	3	3	6	6	5	6	7	8	5	7	8	9	7	5
Bahia	17	17	13	11	6	4	4	4	5	5	4	6	4	5	4	5	6
Cruzeiro	2	4	2	2	2	5	5	8	10	6	6	7	8	6	8	6	7
Grêmio	10	16	17	15	14	11	12	12	12	12	10	9	10	9	6	9	8
Internacional	11	8	8	8	11	10	8	7	4	4	5	8	5	7	7	10	9
Red Bull Bragantino	3	9	9	6	10	12	10	10	9	10	9	10	9	10	11	11	10
Fluminense	9	6	5	4	8	7	9	6	8	9	11	11	12	12	10	8	11
Santos	6	7	3	7	7	8	11	11	11	11	12	12	11	11	12	12	12
Atlético Mineiro	15	15	15	16	13	15	14	13	13	13	13	13	13	13	13	13	13
Mixto	13	12	16	14	12	13	13	14	14	15	15	15	15	15	14	14	14
Juventude	12	14	12	13	16	16	16	16	16	14	14	14	14	14	15	15	15
América Mineiro	18	18	18	18	18	17	18	17	17	17	17	17	16	16	16	16	16
Vitória	14	13	14	17	17	18	17	18	18	18	18	16	17	17	17	17	17
Botafogo	5	10	11	12	15	14	15	15	15	16	16	18	18	18	18	18	18

Leader and Qualification for the Final Stages
Qualification for the Final Stages
Relegation to the 2027 Série A2

Source: CBF

=== Results ===
Home \ Away	AME	ATL	BAH	BOT	COR	CRU	AFE	FLA	FLU	GRE	INT	JUV	MIX	PAL	RBB	SAN	SPA	VIT
América Mineiro		0–2						1–1			0–2	0–1	1–1		1–2	0–1	0–0	0–0
Atlético Mineiro			0–3	2–0	0–1		2–3		1–1	2–0	0–1						1–2	
Bahia	3–1			2–1	1–1	0–2				0–2	3–0			0–0		3–1		3–2
Botafogo	0–3				1–3			1–1	1–2			2–1			0–3	1–1	1–5	
Corinthians	4–0						3–1		2–2		1–3		4–1		5–1	4–1	2–1	4–0
Cruzeiro	4–0	3–1		4–0	3–2				3–2		1–2			0–0		1–1	1–2	
Ferroviária	4–1		1–0	2–1		1–1			1–1	0–0			3–0	0–0				2–0
Flamengo		4–1	1–3		0–1	1–1	1–1		1–0	2–2					4–2			3–1
Fluminense	4–1		3–3									1–0		1–2	2–1	0–2	0–0	1–0
Grêmio	1–0			1–0	0–2	2–0			0–1				3–0	1–2				3–0
Internacional				1–0			1–2	0–1	1–0	1–2		1–0			1–1		1–2	
Juventude		0–0	2–2		0–1	0–0	0–0	1–3		1–1			0–1					
Mixto		0–0	1–1	2–1		1–2		0–1	0–2		0–0			0–0				
Palmeiras	4–0	4–1		3–0	3–2			1–1			2–1	3–0				0–0		6–0
Red Bull Bragantino		2–0	1–2			2–2	2–0			0–3		2–0	3–1	1–2				6–2
Santos		1–1					1–1	2–3		2–1	0–3	4–0	3–0		0–1			
São Paulo			2–1				0–1	2–1		3–1		1–0	1–0	3–0	1–0	3–0		
Vitória		0–3		2–0		2–2					2–2	0–3	2–2			1–2	1–3	

Source: CBF
Legend: Blue = home team win; Yellow = draw; Red = away team win.

=== Results by round ===
Team ╲ Round	1	2	3	4	5	6	7	8	9	10	11	12	13	14	15	16	17
América Mineiro	L	L	L	L	D	L	L	D	D	L	L	W	L	L	D	L	L
Atlético Mineiro	L	D	L	L	W	L	D	W	D	L	W	L	L	D	L	W	L
Bahia	L	L	W	W	W	W	W	L	D	D	W	D	W	L	W	D	D
Botafogo	W	L	D	L	L	D	L	L	L	L	L	L	L	L	L	L	L
Corinthians	W	D	L	W	W	W	W	W	W	W	L	W	W	W	W	D	L
Cruzeiro	W	D	W	D	W	D	L	D	D	W	W	D	L	W	L	W	D
Ferroviária	L	W	W	D	D	D	W	L	W	D	W	W	D	W	D	W	D
Flamengo	W	W	D	D	W	D	L	W	L	D	W	W	D	L	D	W	W
Fluminense	W	D	W	D	L	W	L	W	D	L	L	D	L	W	W	W	D
Grêmio	L	L	L	D	W	W	L	W	L	W	W	D	D	W	W	L	W
Internacional	L	W	D	W	L	D	W	W	W	W	L	L	W	L	D	L	W
Juventude	L	D	W	L	L	L	L	L	D	W	L	D	D	L	L	L	D
Mixto	L	D	L	W	D	D	L	L	L	D	L	L	D	D	W	L	L
Palmeiras	W	W	W	W	L	D	W	D	D	W	W	W	D	W	D	W	D
Red Bull Bragantino	W	L	D	W	L	L	W	D	W	L	W	L	W	L	L	W	W
Santos	W	D	W	L	D	D	D	D	L	W	L	L	W	W	L	L	W
São Paulo	W	W	L	D	W	W	W	D	W	L	W	W	W	W	W	W	W
Vitória	L	D	L	L	L	L	W	L	D	L	L	D	L	L	D	L	L

Source: CBF
W = Win; D = Draw; L = Loss

== Final stages ==
Starting from the quarter-finals, the teams played a single-elimination tournament with the following rules:

- Quarter-finals, semi-finals and finals were played on a home-and-away two-legged basis, with the higher-seeded team hosting the second leg.
  - If tied on aggregate, the penalty shoot-out would be used to determine the winners (Regulations Article 17).
- Extra time would not be played and away goals rule would not be used in final stages.

Starting from the semi-finals, the teams were seeded according to their performance in the tournament. The teams were ranked according to overall points. If tied on overall points, the following criteria would be used to determine the ranking: 1. Overall wins; 2. Overall goal difference; 3. Overall goals scored; 4. Fewest red cards; 5. Fewest yellow cards; 6. Draw in the headquarters of the Brazilian Football Confederation (Regulations Article 22).

=== Bracket ===
Quarter-finals
Bahia (p)	1	1	2 (5)
(São Paulo (state)) Palmeiras	1	1	2 (4)
(Minas Gerais) Cruzeiro	0	1	1
(São Paulo (state)) Corinthians	1	3	4
(Rio de Janeiro (state)) Flamengo	1	2	3
(São Paulo (state)) Ferroviária	0	2	2
(Rio Grande do Sul) Grêmio	0	0	0
(São Paulo (state)) São Paulo	0	2	2

Semi-finals
Bahia	0	0	0
(São Paulo (state)) Corinthians	1	1	2
(Rio de Janeiro (state)) Flamengo	1	0	1
(São Paulo (state)) São Paulo	3	1	4

Finals
(São Paulo (state)) Corinthians	1	1	2
(São Paulo (state)) São Paulo	2	1	3

=== Quarter-finals ===
Team 1	Agg.	Team 2	1st leg	2nd leg
Grêmio (Rio Grande do Sul)	0–2	(São Paulo (state)) São Paulo	0–0	0–2
Cruzeiro (Minas Gerais)	1–4	(São Paulo (state)) Corinthians	0–1	1–3
Bahia	2–2 (5–4 p)	(São Paulo (state)) Palmeiras	1–1	1–1
Flamengo (Rio de Janeiro (state))	3–2	(São Paulo (state)) Ferroviária	1–0	2–2

==== Group B ====
29 August 2026
16:30

Grêmio (Rio Grande do Sul)	0–0	(São Paulo (state)) São Paulo
	Report

Estádio Alfredo Jaconi, Caxias do Sul
Referee: Rejane Caetano da Silva (Ceará)

5 September 2026
16:30

São Paulo (São Paulo (state))	2–0	(Rio Grande do Sul) Grêmio
Giovanna Crivelari 89'; Vi Amaral 90+5'	Report

Estádio Brinco de Ouro, Campinas
Referee: Andreza Helena de Siqueira (Minas Gerais)

São Paulo advanced to the semi-finals.

==== Group C ====
31 August 2026
19:15

Cruzeiro (Minas Gerais)	0–1	(São Paulo (state)) Corinthians
	Report	Victória 90+5'

Arena Independência, Belo Horizonte
Referee: Elizabete Esmeralda Cordeiro dos Santos Gomes (Ceará)

7 September 2026
17:00

Corinthians (São Paulo (state))	3–1	(Minas Gerais) Cruzeiro
Jhonson 19'; Tamires 27'; Thaís Ferreira 60'	Report	Marília 5'

Estádio do Canindé, São Paulo
Referee: Rejane Caetano da Silva (Ceará)

Corinthians advanced to the semi-finals.

==== Group D ====
31 August 2026
21:30

Bahia	1–1	(São Paulo (state)) Palmeiras
Carballo 44'	Report	Brena 28'

Arena Fonte Nova, Salvador
Referee: Thayslane de Melo Costa (Sergipe)

4 September 2026
21:30

Palmeiras (São Paulo (state))	1–1	Bahia
Raíssa Bahia 27'	Report	Dan Nunes 56'
Penalties
Bia Zaneratto (penalty scored); Poliana (penalty scored); Tainá Maranhão (penalty missed); Fê Palermo (penalty scored); Pati Maldaner (penalty scored)	4–5	(penalty scored) Gica; (penalty scored) Isa Fernandes; (penalty scored) Taty Sena; (penalty scored) Carballo; (penalty scored) Cássia

Arena Barueri, Barueri
Referee: Deborah Cecilia Cruz Correia (Pernambuco)

Bahia advanced to the semi-finals.

==== Group E ====
29 August 2026
16:30

Flamengo (Rio de Janeiro (state))	1–0	(São Paulo (state)) Ferroviária
Mariana Fernandes 2'	Report

Estádio Luso Brasileiro, Rio de Janeiro
Referee: Deborah Cecilia Cruz Correia (Pernambuco)

5 September 2026
16:30

Ferroviária (São Paulo (state))	2–2	(Rio de Janeiro (state)) Flamengo
Thayslane 15'; Dos Santos 19'	Report	Fabi Simões 11'; Jucinara 30'

Fonte Luminosa, Araraquara
Referee: Ruthyanna Camila Medeiros da Silva (Paraíba)

Flamengo advanced to the semi-finals.

=== Semi-finals ===
Pos	Team	Pld	W	D	L	GF	GA	GD	Pts	Host
1	(São Paulo (state)) São Paulo	19	14	3	2	33	11	+22	45	Second leg
3	(Rio de Janeiro (state)) Flamengo	19	9	7	3	32	22	+10	34	First leg
2	(São Paulo (state)) Corinthians	19	14	2	3	46	19	+27	44	Second leg
4	Bahia	19	8	7	4	32	23	+9	31	First leg

Source: CBF

Team 1	Agg.	Team 2	1st leg	2nd leg
Flamengo (Rio de Janeiro (state))	1–4	(São Paulo (state)) São Paulo	1–3	0–1
Bahia	0–2	(São Paulo (state)) Corinthians	0–1	0–1

==== Group F ====
12 September 2026
16:30

Flamengo (Rio de Janeiro (state))	1–3	(São Paulo (state)) São Paulo
Mariana Fernandes 52'	Report	Mylena Carioca 71'; Robinha 87'; Bruna Calderan 90+8' (pen.)

Estádio Luso Brasileiro, Rio de Janeiro
Referee: Elizabete Esmeralda Cordeiro dos Santos Gomes (Ceará)

19 September 2026
16:30

São Paulo (São Paulo (state))	1–0	(Rio de Janeiro (state)) Flamengo
Késia Sena 88'	Report

Estádio Brinco de Ouro, Campinas
Referee: Ruthyanna Camila Medeiros da Silva (Paraíba)

São Paulo advanced to the finals.

==== Group G ====
15 September 2026
21:30

Bahia	0–1	(São Paulo (state)) Corinthians
	Report	Jhonson 13'

Arena Fonte Nova, Salvador
Referee: Andreza Helena de Siqueira (Minas Gerais)

21 September 2026
21:30

Corinthians (São Paulo (state))	1–0	Bahia
Jhonson 44'	Report

Neo Química Arena, São Paulo
Referee: Deborah Cecilia Cruz Correia (Pernambuco)

Corinthians advanced to the finals.

=== Finals ===
Pos	Team	Pld	W	D	L	GF	GA	GD	Pts	Host
1	(São Paulo (state)) São Paulo	21	16	3	2	37	12	+25	51	2nd leg
2	(São Paulo (state)) Corinthians	21	16	2	3	48	19	+29	50	1st leg

Source: CBF

Team 1	Agg.	Team 2	1st leg	2nd leg
Corinthians (São Paulo (state))	2–3	(São Paulo (state)) São Paulo	1–2	1–1

==== Group H ====
26 September 2026
16:30

Corinthians (São Paulo (state))	1–2	(São Paulo (state)) São Paulo
Gabi Zanotti 9'	Report	Giovanna Crivelari 20'; Isa Guimarães 67'

Neo Química Arena, São Paulo
Attendance: 21,871
Referee: Francielly Fernanda Lima de Castro (Minas Gerais)

3 October 2026
16:30

São Paulo (São Paulo (state))	1–1	(São Paulo (state)) Corinthians
Bia Menezes 10'	Report	Juliete 18'

MorumBIS, São Paulo
Attendance: 49,405
Referee: Daiane Muniz (São Paulo)

== Season statistics ==
=== Top goalscorers ===
Rank	Player	Club	Goals
1	(Brazil) Marília	Cruzeiro	11
2	(Brazil) Bia Zaneratto	Palmeiras	9
3	(Brazil) Raquel	Bahia	8
4	(Brazil) Brena	Palmeiras	7
4	(Brazil) Gabi Zanotti	Corinthians	7
4	(Brazil) Giovanna Crivelari	São Paulo	7
4	(Brazil) Jhonson	Corinthians	7
4	(Brazil) Rafa Mineira	Red Bull Bragantino	7

Source: CBF

=== Top assists ===
Rank	Player	Club	Assists
1	(Uruguay) Belén Aquino	Corinthians	7
1	(Brazil) Gabi Zanotti	Corinthians	7
3	(Brazil) Andressa Alves	Corinthians	6
3	(Brazil) Raquel Fernandes	Fluminense	6
5	(Brazil) Aline Milene	São Paulo	5
5	(Brazil) Bia Zaneratto	Palmeiras	5
5	(Brazil) Cássia	Bahia	5
5	(Brazil) Djeni	Flamengo	5
5	(Brazil) Gláucia	Palmeiras	5
5	(Brazil) Patrícia Sochor	Fluminense	5

Source: ogol

=== Top clean sheets ===
Rank	Player	Club	Clean sheets
1	(Brazil) Carlinha	São Paulo	7
1	(Brazil) Gabi Barbieri	Internacional	7
1	(Brazil) Luciana	Ferroviária	7
4	(Colombia) Katherine Tapia	Palmeiras	6
5	(Brazil) Kemelli	Fluminense	5
5	(Brazil) Maike Weber	Atlético Mineiro	5
5	(Brazil) Taty Amaro	Santos	5

Source: FBref

=== Hat-tricks ===
Player	For	Against	Result	Data
(Brazil) Tainá Maranhão	Palmeiras	Atlético Mineiro	4–1 (H)	11 May 2026 (Group stage, R10)
(Brazil) Marília	Cruzeiro	Botafogo	4–0 (H)	1 August 2026 (Group stage, R14)

=== Discipline ===
	Most yellow cards	Total	Most red cards	Total
Player	(Brazil) Leidiane (Grêmio)	8	(Brazil) Karina Silva (Fluminense)	2
Club	Bahia	51	Cruzeiro	3

Source: ogol

== Attendance ==
As of 26 May 2026

=== Average home attendances ===
Ranked from highest to lowest average attendance.

Regular season
Rank	Team	GP	Attendance	High	Low	Average
1	Corinthians	6	11,317	5,081	190	1,886
2	Santos	6	8,592	2,922	210	1,432
3	Palmeiras	7	7,306	4,244	91	1,043
4	Cruzeiro	6	6,122	1,856	674	1,020
5	Grêmio	5	1,719	754	138	343
6	Mixto	5	1,655	932	100	331
7	Ferroviária	6	1,744	461	155	290
8	Internacional	6	1,627	610	111	271
9	Atlético Mineiro	6	1,519	605	103	253
10	Bahia	7	1,645	920	20	235
11	São Paulo	7	1,291	452	70	184
12	Flamengo	6	1,055	326	98	175
13	Juventude	5	822	250	32	164
14	Red Bull Bragantino	7	1,118	368	22	159
15	Botafogo	6	916	380	37	152
16	América Mineiro	1	147	147	0	147
17	Vitória	4	445	179	51	111
18	Fluminense	6	653	187	67	108
	Total	102	49,963	5,081	20	487

Updated through 28 May 2026

América Mineiro's first five matches it has hosted were played behind closed doors and were not included in the average attendance figures.

=== Highest attendances ===
Regular season
Rank	Home team	Score	Away team	Attendance	Date	Stadium
1	Corinthians	2–2	Fluminense	5 081	20 February 2026	Neo Quimica Arena
2	Palmeiras	6–0	Vitória	4 244	22 March 2026	Allianz Parque
3	Corinthians	4–0	América Mineiro	4 147	23 March 2026	Neo Quimica Arena
4	Santos	0–3	Internacional	2 922	1 May 2026	Vila Belmiro
5	Santos	1–1	Atlético Mineiro	2 466	20 April 2026	Vila Belmiro
6	Santos	2–1	Grêmio	2 006	16 February 2026	Vila Belmiro
7	Cruzeiro	3–1	Atlético Mineiro	1 856	14 March 2026	Arena do Jacaré
8	Palmeiras	0–0	Santos	1 469	27 April 2026	Allianz Parque
9	Cruzeiro	1–2	Internacional	1 098	21 April 2026	Arena do Jacaré
10	Cruzeiro	1–1	Santos	971	23 February 2026	Arena do Jacaré

Updated through 9 May 2026
