= Aline Milene =

Brazilian footballer (born 1994)

Personal information
- Full name: Aline Milene de Lima
- Date of birth: 8 April 1994 (age 32)
- Place of birth: Belo Horizonte, Brazil
- Height: 1.60 m (5 ft 3 in)
- Position: Midfielder

Team information
- Current team: São Paulo
- Number: 7

College career
Years	Team	Apps	(Gls)
2014	Northwest Trappers	17	(10)
2015	Monroe Mustangs	17	(23)
2016–2017	Baylor Lady Bears	37	(11)

Senior career*
Years	Team	Apps	(Gls)
2017–2012	Atlético Mineiro		
2019–2022	Ferroviária	61	(9)
2023–	São Paulo	67	(14)

International career^{‡}
2018–	Brazil	10	(1)
- * Club domestic league appearances and goals as of 1 February 2025 ‡ National team caps and goals as of 10 March 2020

Aline Milene de Lima (born 8 April 1994), simply known as Aline, is a Brazilian professional footballer who plays as a midfielder for Série A1 club São Paulo FC and the Brazil women's national team.

== College career ==
De Lima moved to the United States and attended the Northwest College, the Monroe College and the Baylor University.

== International goals ==
Scores and results list Brazil's goal tally first

No.	Date	Venue	Opponent	Score	Result	Competition
1	13 April 2018	Estadio Municipal Francisco Sánchez Rumoroso, Coquimbo, Chile	Bolivia	7–0	7–0	2018 Copa América Femenina
2	6 December 2023	Fonte Luminosa, Araraquara, Brazil	Nicaragua	4–0	4–0	Friendly game

== Honours ==
São Paulo

- Campeonato Brasileiro Série A1: 2026
- Supercopa do Brasil: 2025

Brazil

- Copa América Femenina: 2018
