= 2024 Thai Women's League 2 =

Thai Women's League 2
- Season: 2024
- Dates: 2 March 2024 – 14 July 2024
- Champions: Nakhon Si Thammarat Sports School
- Promoted: Nakhon Si Thammarat Sports School; Khelang United
- Relegated: Langsuan City; Mahanakon Khon Kaen
- Matches: 56
- Goals: 220 (3.93 per match)
- Top goalscorer: (Thailand) Parichat Thongrong (15 goals; Nakhon Si Thammarat Sports School)
- Best goalkeeper: (Thailand) Yada Sengyong (10 clean sheets; Nakhon Si Thammarat Sports School)
- Biggest home win: 8 goals difference Nakhon Si Thammarat Sports School 8–0 Burirat Academy (14 July 2024)
- Biggest away win: 6 goals difference Sisaket 0–6 Nakhon Si Thammarat Sports School (9 June 2024); Mahanakon Khon Kaen 0–6 Nakhon Si Thammarat Sports School (16 June 2024)
- Highest scoring: 11 goals Khelang United 8–3 Sisaket (31 May 2024)
- Longest winning run: 14 matches Nakhon Si Thammarat Sports School
- Longest unbeaten run: 14 matches Nakhon Si Thammarat Sports School
- Longest winless run: 7 matches Mahanakon Khon Kaen
- Longest losing run: 6 matches Mahanakon Khon Kaen

The 2024 Thai Women's League 2 is the 7th season of the Thai Women's League 2, the second-tier Thai professional league for women's association football clubs, since its establishment in 2010. A total of 8 teams will compete in the league.

== Teams ==
=== Number of teams by province ===
Position	Province	Number	Teams
1	Buriram	1	Burirat Academy
1	Chonburi	1	Phranakorn
1	Chumphon	1	Langsuan City
1	Khon Kaen	1	Mahanakon Khon Kaen
1	Lampang	1	Khelang United
1	Nakhon Sawan	1	Nakhon Sawan
1	Nakhon Si Thammarat	1	Nakhon Si Thammarat Sports School
1	Sisaket	1	Sisaket

=== Stadiums and locations ===
Locations of the 2024 Thai Women's League 2 teams

Team	Location	Stadium	Coordinates
Burirat Academy	Buriram (Mueang)	Stadium of Buriram Rajabhat University	14°59′25″N 103°05′49″E
Khelang United	Lampang (Mueang)	Stadium of Lampang Sports School	18°19′14″N 99°29′13″E
Langsuan City	Chumphon (Lang Suan)	Langsuan Town Municipality Stadium	9°56′51″N 99°04′43″E
Mahanakon Khon Kaen	Khon Kaen (Phra Yuen)	Stadium of Prayuenwittayakarn School	16°19′42″N 102°38′42″E
Nakhon Sawan	Nakhon Sawan (Mueang)	Stadium of Nakhon Sawan Sports School	15°44′33″N 100°07′56″E
Nakhon Si Thammarat Sports School	Nakhon Si Thammarat (Thung Song)	Stadium of Nakhon Si Thammarat Sports School	8°11′06″N 99°37′08″E
Phranakorn	Chonburi (Mueang)	Stadium of Thailand National Sports University, Chonburi Campus	13°24′41″N 100°59′37″E
Sisaket	Sisaket (Mueang)	Stadium of Sisaket Sports School	15°06′14″N 104°20′17″E

=== Foreign players ===
A Thai Women's League 2 team could register 3 foreign players from foreign players all around the world. A team can use 3 foreign players on the field in each game.

Note :
(substituted off) : players who released during second leg transfer window;
(substituted on) : players who registered during second leg transfer window.

AFC member countries players.
CAF member countries players.
CONCACAF member countries players.
CONMEBOL member countries players.
OFC member countries players.
UEFA member countries players.
No foreign player registered.

Club	Leg	Player 1	Player 2	Player 3
Burirat Academy	1st
Burirat Academy	2nd
Khelang United	1st
Khelang United	2nd
Langsuan City	1st
Langsuan City	2nd
Mahanakon Khon Kaen	1st
Mahanakon Khon Kaen	2nd
Nakhon Sawan	1st
Nakhon Sawan	2nd
Nakhon Si Thammarat Sports School	1st
Nakhon Si Thammarat Sports School	2nd
Phranakorn	1st	(Brazil) Yasmim Cardozo (substituted off)	(Italy) Ginevra Bisi	(United States) Sayako Ikeda
Phranakorn	2nd		(Italy) Ginevra Bisi	(United States) Sayako Ikeda
Sisaket	1st
Sisaket	2nd

== League table ==
=== Standings ===
Pos	Team	Pld	W	D	L	GF	GA	GD	Pts	Qualification or relegation
1	Nakhon Si Thammarat Sports School (C, P)	14	14	0	0	60	4	+56	42	Promotion to 2025 Thai Women's League 1
2	Langsuan City (R)	14	7	2	5	33	22	+11	23	Relegation to 2025 Thai Women's League 2 qualification (Note: Langsuan City was administratively relegated to the 2025 Thai Women's League 2 qualification for failing to meet Club Licensing standards.)
3	Khelang United (P)	14	6	3	5	41	29	+12	21	Promotion to 2025 Thai Women's League 1 (Note: Khelang United was promoted to the 2025 Thai Women's League 1 after Langsuan City failed to meet the Club Licensing criteria for the 2025 season. As a result, Khelang United, who finished just below Langsuan City, was granted the promotion spot.)
4	Nakhon Sawan	14	5	5	4	25	31	−6	20	
5	Phranakorn	14	5	4	5	23	24	−1	19	
6	Sisaket	14	5	2	7	16	36	−20	17	
7	Burirat Academy (Note: Burirat Academy remained in the league after Langsuan City failed to meet the Club Licensing criteria for the 2025 season, resulting in Burirat Academy retaining its spot.)	14	2	3	9	13	31	−18	9	
8	Mahanakon Khon Kaen (R)	14	2	1	11	9	43	−34	7	Relegation to 2025 Thai Women's League 2 qualification

Source: Thai League
Rules for classification: 1) Points; 2) Head-to-head points; 3) Head-to-head goal difference; 4) Head-to-head goal scored; 5) Overall goal difference; 6) Overall goal scored; 7) Fair play points; 8) Play-off without extra time).
(C) Champions; (P) Promoted; (R) Relegated

=== Positions by round ===
Team ╲ Round	1	2	3	4	5	6	7	8	9	10	11	12	13	14
Nakhon Si Thammarat Sports School	4	1	1	1	1	1	1	1	1	1	1	1	1	1
Langsuan City	7	6	6	3	4	4	4	3	4	4	4	4	3	2
Khelang United	1	3	3	2	2	2	2	2	2	2	2	2	2	3
Nakhon Sawan	6	4	4	6	6	6	6	6	5	5	5	5	5	4
Phranakorn	2	5	5	4	3	3	3	4	3	3	3	3	4	5
Sisaket	3	2	2	5	5	5	5	5	6	6	6	6	6	6
Burirat Academy	5	7	7	7	7	7	8	7	7	7	7	7	7	7
Mahanakon Khon Kaen	8	8	8	8	8	8	7	8	8	8	8	8	8	8

Source: Thai League
= Leader and promotion to 2025 Thai Women's League 1; = Promotion to 2025 Thai Women's League 1; = Relegation to 2025 Thai Women's League 2 qualification

=== Results by round ===
Team ╲ Round	1	2	3	4	5	6	7	8	9	10	11	12	13	14
Nakhon Si Thammarat Sports School	W	W	W	W	W	W	W	W	W	W	W	W	W	W
Langsuan City	L	W	D	W	L	L	W	W	L	D	L	W	W	W
Khelang United	W	L	D	W	W	W	L	W	D	D	W	L	L	L
Nakhon Sawan	L	W	D	L	D	L	D	D	W	D	W	L	W	W
Phranakorn	W	L	D	W	W	W	L	L	D	D	W	D	L	L
Sisaket	W	W	L	L	D	L	W	L	L	D	L	W	W	L
Burirat Academy	L	L	W	L	L	L	L	D	W	D	L	D	L	L
Mahanakon Khon Kaen	L	L	L	L	L	W	D	L	L	L	L	L	L	W

Source: Thai League
W = Won; D = Drawn; L = Lost

=== Results ===
Home \ Away	BRA	KLU	LSC	MKK	NSW	NSS	PNK	SKT
Burirat Academy	—	1–2	0–0	2–0	0–3	0–1	0–1	0–1
Khelang United	5–2	—	4–1	5–1	6–0	0–3	0–0	8–3
Langsuan City	4–1	6–3	—	1–0	1–2	1–2	2–0	8–1
Mahanakon Khon Kaen	1–3	2–0	1–6	—	1–1	0–6	1–5	2–0
Nakhon Sawan	2–2	3–3	0–0	6–0	—	0–4	1–3	2–2
Nakhon Si Thammarat Sports School	8–0	2–1	4–0	3–0	8–1	—	7–1	3–0
Phranakorn	2–2	2–2	2–3	3–0	1–2	0–3	—	1–1
Sisaket	1–0	3–2	2–0	2–0	0–2	0–6	0–2	—

Source: Thai League
Legend: Blue = home team win; Yellow = draw; Red = away team win.
For upcoming matches, an "a" indicates there is an article about the rivalry between the two participants.

== Season statistics ==
=== Top scorers ===
As of 14 July 2024.

Rank	Player	Club	Goals
1	(Thailand) Parichat Thongrong	Nakhon Si Thammarat Sports School	15
2	(Thailand) Nualanong Muensri	Nakhon Si Thammarat Sports School	12
3	(Thailand) Rinyaphat Moondong	Khelang United	9
3	(Thailand) Rungnapa Tonthuen	Nakhon Sawan	9
3	(Thailand) Nopparat Tepsiri	Nakhon Si Thammarat Sports School	9
3	(Thailand) Chattaya Pratumkul	Phranakorn	9
7	(Thailand) Pattharatida Saenglaeb	Khelang United	8
8	(Thailand) Chirarak Khamtan	Khelang United	6
8	(Thailand) Natnicha Buadam	Langsuan City	6
8	(Thailand) Pinyaphat Klinklai	Nakhon Si Thammarat Sports School	6

=== Hat-tricks ===
Player	For	Against	Result	Date
(Thailand) Natnicha Buadam	Langsuan City	Burirat Academy	4–1 (H)	23 March 2024
(Thailand) Rinyaphat Moondong	Khelang United	Sisaket	8–3 (H)	31 May 2024
(Thailand) Chirarak Khamtan	Khelang United	Sisaket	8–3 (H)	31 May 2024
(Thailand) Alisa Rukpinij^{4}	Langsuan City	Mahanakon Khon Kaen	6–1 (A)	1 June 2024
(Thailand) Parichat Thongrong	Nakhon Si Thammarat Sports School	Mahanakon Khon Kaen	6–0 (A)	16 June 2024
(Thailand) Nualanong Muensri^{4}	Nakhon Si Thammarat Sports School	Nakhon Sawan	8–1 (H)	29 June 2024
(Thailand) Sailom Pittayanukulsup	Langsuan City	Sisaket	8–1 (H)	13 July 2024

Notes: ^{4} = Player scored 4 goals; (H) = Home team; (A) = Away team

=== Clean sheets ===
As of 14 July 2024.

Rank	Player	Club	Clean sheets
1	(Thailand) Yada Sengyong	Nakhon Si Thammarat Sports School	10
2	(Thailand) Nongnut Ritthakon	Nakhon Si Thammarat Sports School	5
3	(Thailand) Kamolthip Chanthakhai	Langsuan City	4
3	(Thailand) Witchakon Thammachak	Nakhon Sawan	4
3	(Thailand) Pimlapat Aeewong	Phranakorn	4
6	(Thailand) Chunchanok Watsuwan	Sisaket	3
7	(Thailand) Chanikan Homhuanl	Burirat Academy	2
