= Isa Guimarães =

Brazilian footballer (born 2003)

Isa
Personal information
- Full name: Isabelle Caroline Guimarães da Silva
- Date of birth: 19 October 2003 (age 23)
- Place of birth: São Paulo, Brazil
- Height: 1.59 m (5 ft 3 in)
- Position: Forward

Team information
- Current team: São Paulo
- Number: 77

Youth career
- 2017–2022: São Paulo

Senior career*
Years	Team	Apps	(Gls)
2021–	São Paulo	109	(20)

International career^{‡}
2022	Brazil U20	5	(0)
2025–	Brazil	1	(0)
- * Club domestic league appearances and goals as of 05:56, 29 May 2026 (UTC) ‡ National team caps and goals as of 05:56, 29 May 2026 (UTC)

Isabelle Caroline Guimarães da Silva (born 19 October 2003) better known as Isa, is a Brazilian footballer who plays as a forward for São Paulo and the Brazil national team.

== Career ==
Isa Guimarães joined São Paulo in 2017 and rose through the youth ranks. She began training with the club's first team in late 2020 and signed a professional contract in 2021. In 2025, Isa appeared in 26 games for São Paulo, scoring six goals.

Isa Guimarães made her debut for the Brazil national team on 25 October 2025 in a game against England.

== Honours ==
São Paulo

- Campeonato Brasileiro Série A1: 2026
- Supercopa do Brasil: 2025
