= Giovanna Crivelari =

Brazilian footballer (born 1993)

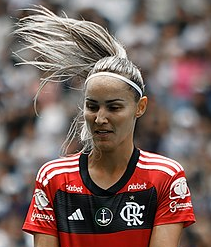
- Crivelari in 2023

Personal information
- Full name: Giovanna Crivelari Anselmo
- Date of birth: 23 February 1993 (age 33)
- Place of birth: Londrina, Brazil
- Height: 1.69 m (5 ft 7 in)
- Position: Forward

Team information
- Current team: São Paulo

Senior career*
Years	Team	Apps	(Gls)
2016	Vitória-PE	3	(1)
2017–2018	Kindermann	31	(14)
2019–2021	Corinthians	48	(19)
2021–2022	Levante	22	(3)
2022–2024	Flamengo	65	(32)
2025–	São Paulo		

International career^{‡}
2012	Brazil U20	1	(0)
- * Club domestic league appearances and goals as of 2 February 2025 ‡ National team caps and goals as of 16:18, 21 March 2024 (UTC)

Giovanna Crivelari Anselmo (born 23 February 1993), known as Crivelari, is a Brazilian professional footballer who plays as a forward for São Paulo.

== Club career ==
=== Vitória das Tabocas ===
Crivelari scored on her league debut for Vitória das Tabocas against Flamengo on 20 January 2016, scoring in the 15th minute.

=== Kindermann ===
Crivelari made her league debut for Kindermann against Iranduba on 12 March 2017. She scored her first goals for the club against Vitória das Tabocas on 29 March 2017, scoring in the 1st and 26th minute.

=== Corinthians ===
Crivelari scored on her league debut for Corinthians against Ponte Preta on 16 March 2019, scoring in the 25th and 43rd minute.

=== Levante ===
In August 2021, Crivelari transferred to Levante and signed a two-year contract with the Spanish club. She made her debut against Real Madrid on 5 September 2021. Crivelari scored her first league goals for the club against Eibar on 29 September 2021, scoring in the 78th and 85th minute.

=== Flamengo ===
Crivelari signed for Flamengo in July 2022, choosing the shirt number 93 as it was the year she was born. She scored on her league debut for Flamengo against RB Bragantino, scoring in the 11th minute.

=== São Paulo ===
Giovanna Criverari was announced by São Paulo FC on 2 January 2025.

== International career ==
Crivelari made one appearance for the Brazil U20s against Italy U20s on 19 August 2012.

Crivelari was called up to the Brazil squad in 2021.

== Honours ==
Corinthians

- Copa Libertadores: 2019
- Campeonato Brasileiro: 2020, 2021
- Campeonato Paulista: 2020. 2021

Flamengo

- Campeonato Carioca: 2023, 2024

São Paulo

- Campeonato Brasileiro Série A1: 2026
- Supercopa do Brasil: 2025
