= Bia Menezes =

Brazilian footballer (born 1997)

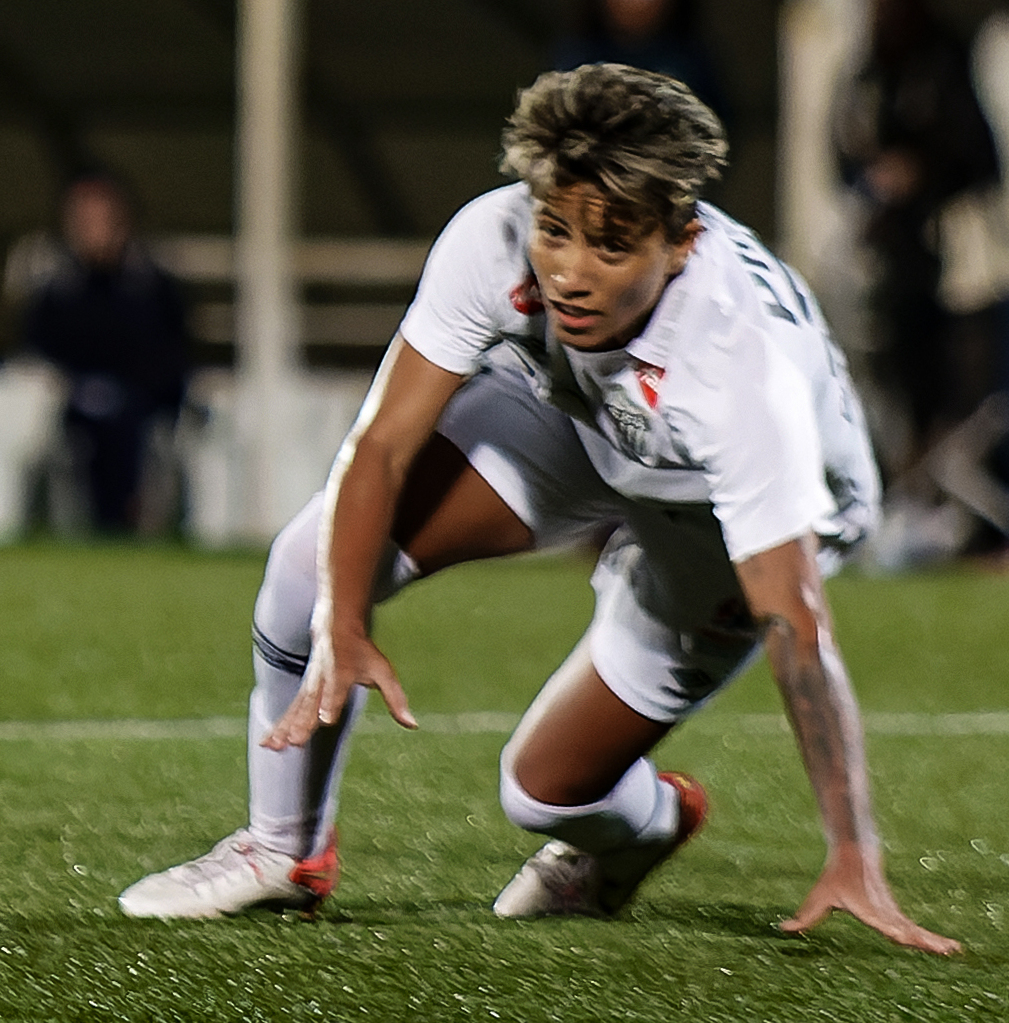
- Bia Menezes with Santos in 2022

Personal information
- Full name: Beatriz Ferreira de Menezes
- Date of birth: 25 June 1997 (age 29)
- Place of birth: São Bernardo do Campo, Brazil
- Height: 1.65 m (5 ft 5 in)
- Positions: Left back; midfielder

Team information
- Current team: São Paulo
- Number: 23

Youth career
- 2014: Centro Olímpico
- 2015: Audax

Senior career*
Years	Team	Apps	(Gls)
2016	Centro Olímpico	2	(0)
2017	Rio Preto	4	(0)
2018–2019	Flamengo	25	(0)
2020–2023	Santos	54	(2)
2024–	São Paulo	21	(3)

International career^{‡}
2015–2016	Brazil U20		
2024–	Brazil	2	(1)
- * Club domestic league appearances and goals as of 15:37, 29 November 2024 (UTC) ‡ National team caps and goals as of 15:37, 29 November 2024 (UTC)

Beatriz Ferreira de Menezes (born 25 June 1997), known as Bia Menezes, is a Brazilian professional footballer who plays as either a left back or a midfielder for São Paulo.

== Club career ==
Born in São José dos Campos, São Paulo, Bia Ferreira made her senior debut with Centro Olímpico in the 2016 season. In 2018, after a year at Rio Preto, she moved to Flamengo.

In January 2020, Bia Menezes left Fla and joined Santos. On 4 January 2024, she signed a two-year deal with São Paulo.

== International career ==
Bia Menezes represented Brazil at under-20 level in the 2015 South American U-20 Women's Championship and the 2016 FIFA U-20 Women's World Cup.

=== International Goals ===
No.	Date	Location	Opponent	Score	Result	Competition
1.	27 February 2024	San Diego, United States	Panama	2–0	5–0	2024 CONCACAF W Gold Cup

== Honours ==
=== Club ===
Santos

- Copa Paulista de Futebol Feminino: 2020

São Paulo

- Campeonato Brasileiro Série A1: 2026
- Supercopa do Brasil: 2025

=== International ===
Brazil U20

- South American U-20 Women's Championship: 2015
