= Dudinha =

Brazilian footballer (born 2005)

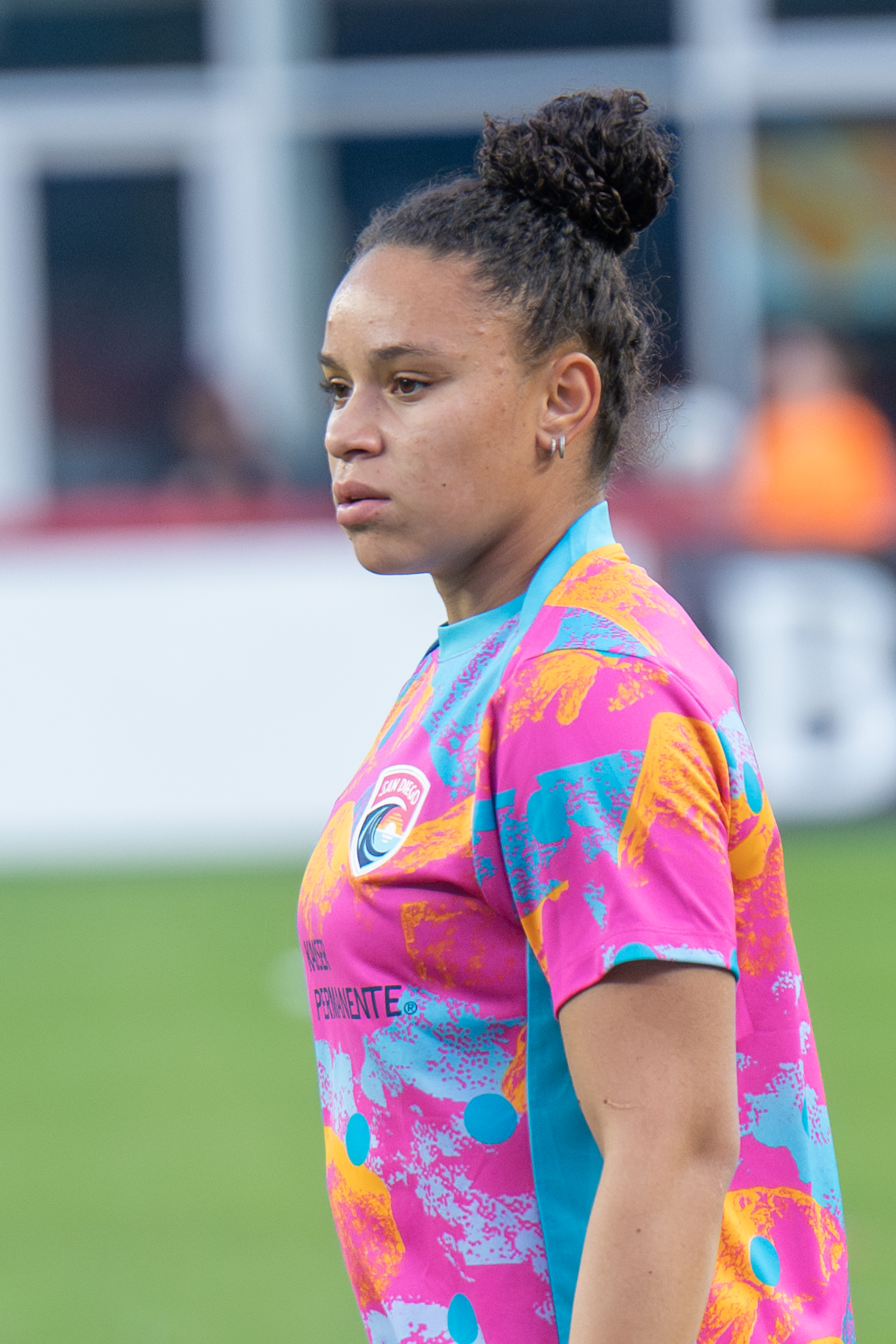
- Dudinha with the San Diego Wave in 2026

Personal information
- Full name: Maria Eduarda Rodrigues Silva
- Date of birth: 4 July 2005 (age 21)
- Place of birth: São Paulo, Brazil
- Height: 1.58 m (5 ft 2 in)
- Positions: Forward; attacking midfielder

Team information
- Current team: San Diego Wave
- Number: 88

Youth career
- 2020–2023: São Paulo

Senior career*
Years	Team	Apps	(Gls)
2022–2025	São Paulo	76	(18)
2025–	San Diego Wave	23	(10)

International career^{‡}
2022	Brazil U17	10	(5)
2022–2024	Brazil U20	9	(2)
2024–	Brazil	11	(4)
Medal record
Women's football
Representing Brazil
Copa América Femenina
Gold medal – first place	2025 Ecuador
- * Club domestic league appearances and goals as of 16:37, 15 November 2026 (UTC) ‡ National team caps and goals as of 25 October 2025

Maria Eduarda Rodrigues Silva (born 4 July 2005), known as Dudinha, is a Brazilian professional footballer who plays as a forward or attacking midfielder for San Diego Wave FC of the National Women's Soccer League (NWSL) and the Brazil national team. She has previously played for São Paulo.

== Club career ==
=== São Paulo ===
Dudinha grew up playing futsal before joining São Paulo's youth teams at the age of 14. She contributed to several youth titles before moving to the senior team in 2023. Dudinha became one of the team's key players in 2024 and was named one of the most promising players under 20 years of age in world football the same year. In 2025, she was a standout player for São Paulo throughout the Campeonato Brasileiro and helped her team win the 2025 Supercopa do Brasil for the first time in history.

=== San Diego Wave ===
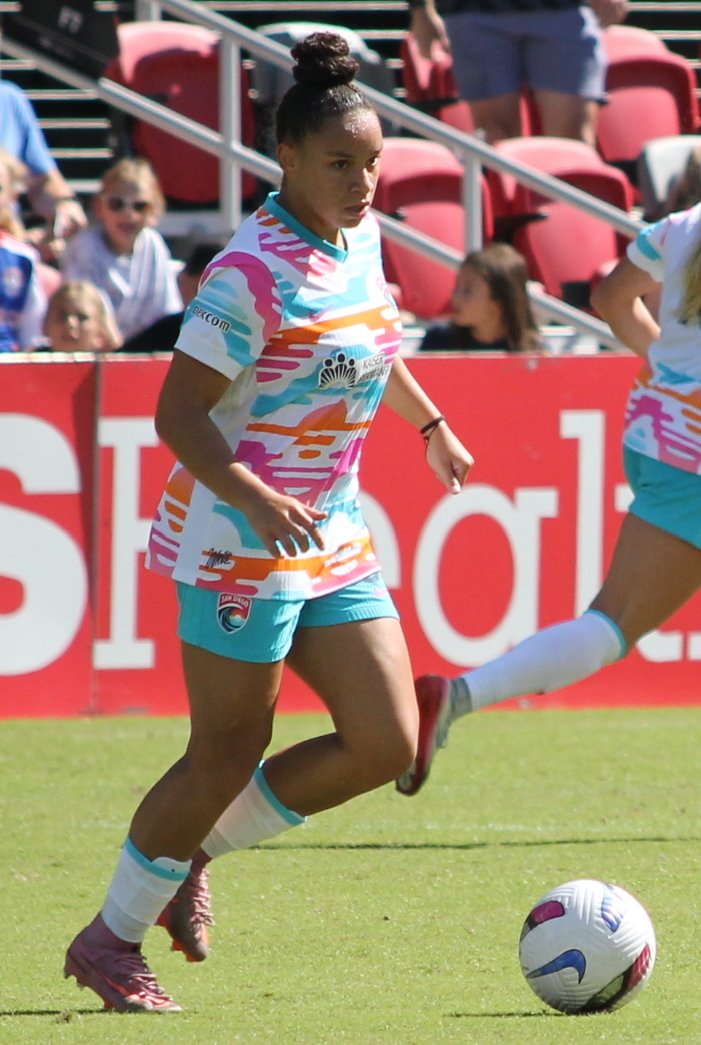
Dudinha with San Diego in 2025

On 24 July 2025, American club San Diego Wave FC acquired Dudinha in exchange for an undisclosed fee and signed her to a three-year contract through 2027. Dudinha made her NWSL debut on 16 August, coming on as a stoppage-time substitute for Delphine Cascarino in a 2–1 victory over Bay FC. On 26 September, she scored her first goal for the Wave, chipping the ball over Orlando Pride goalkeeper Anna Moorhouse to net the equalizing tally in an eventual loss to Orlando. Two weeks later, Dudinha was one of four NWSL players nominated for NWSL Player of the Week honors after she scored a goal in match against the Utah Royals. On 18 October, Dudinha recorded a brace in a 6–1 victory over Chicago Stars FC that both clinched San Diego a spot in the 2025 playoffs and set a club record for goals scored in a single match. Once in the playoffs, Dudinha started and played over 100 minutes of the Wave's quarterfinal match against the Portland Thorns; Portland secured victory with a goal by Reilyn Turner and eliminated San Diego from the postseason. Dudinha's performances through the tail end of 2025 earned her a spot on the October NWSL Team of the Month.

Dudinha opened her second season with the Wave by recording 3 assists and 2 goals in San Diego's opening four matches, earning herself her second league Team of the Month honor. By the midway point in the season, she had become the NWSL's second-highest performer in combined goals and assists. However, in June 2026, Dudinha's momentum was interrupted, as she suffered a serious ACL injury while playing for Brazil.

== International career ==
Dudinha has represented the Brazil U17 and U20 teams on multiple occasions. She was called up to represent the U17 squad at the 2022 FIFA U-17 Women's World Cup and the U20 squad at both the 2022 and 2024 FIFA U-20 Women's World Cups. During the 2022 U-20 competition, she helped Brazil reach third place, its best finish in the tournament since 2006. Dudinha made her debut for the main team on 26 October 2024, coming on as a substitute in a friendly against Colombia. On 30 May 2025 she scored her first goals, against Japan, once again in a friendly match.

== Career statistics ==
Scores and results list Brazil's goal tally first, score column indicates score after each Dudinha goal.

List of international goals scored by Dudinha
No.	Date	Venue	Opponent	Score	Result	Competition
1	30 May 2025	Neo Química Arena, São Paulo, Brazil	Japan	1–0	3–1	Friendly
2	30 May 2025	Neo Química Arena, São Paulo, Brazil	Japan	2–0	3–1	Friendly
3	29 July 2025	Estadio Rodrigo Paz Delgado, Quito, Ecuador	Uruguay	5–1	5–1	2025 Copa América Femenina
4.	25 October 2025	City of Manchester Stadium, Manchester, England	England	2–0	2–1	Friendly
5.	2 December 2025	Estádio Municipal de Aveiro, Aveiro, Portugal	Portugal	3–0	5–0	Friendly
7.	12 April 2026	Arena Pantanal, Cuiabá, Brazil	South Korea	3–0	5–1	2026 FIFA Series

== Honours ==
São Paulo

- Supercopa do Brasil: 2025

São Paulo (youth)

- Campeonato Brasileiro Feminino Sub-18: 2021
- Campeonato Paulista Sub-17: 2021
- Nike Premier Cup Sub-17: 2021

Brazil

- Copa América Femenina: 2025

Brazil U17

- South American Under-17 Women's Football Championship: 2022

Individual

- NWSL Team of the Month: October 2025, March 2026
