= Carla (footballer, born 1997) =

Brazilian footballer

Personal information
- Full name: Carla Maria da Silva
- Date of birth: 4 June 1997 (age 29)
- Place of birth: São Paulo, Brazil
- Height: 1.71 m (5 ft 7 in)
- Position: Goalkeeper

Team information
- Current team: São Paulo

Senior career*
Years	Team	Apps	(Gls)
2015	Grêmio Audax		
2016	Centro Olímpico		
2017	Patriotas Boyacá		
2018	3B da Amazônia		
2018	Grêmio	9	(0)
2019–	São Paulo	153	(0)

International career
2016	Brazil U20	4	(0)
2026–	Brazil	1	(0)
- * Club domestic league appearances and goals as of 1 February 2025

Carla Maria da Silva (born 4 June 1997), also known as Carla, Carla Maria or Carlinha, is a Brazilian professional women's footballer who plays as a goalkeeper for São Paulo.

== Career ==
Having played for Grêmio Audax, Centro Olímpico and the Brazilian under-20 team, Carla also played for Patriotas Boyacá in Colombia, 3B da Amazônia and Grêmio, where she was part of the 2018 state championship win. In 2019 she transferred to São Paulo FC, where she has made 70 appearances as the team's goalkeeper.

On 8 September 2024, gained prominence by defending three penalties in a row in the penalties shoot-out held against Ferroviária, in the semi-finals of the 2024 Brazilian Women's Championship. Carla has been at São Paulo FC since 2019, the year in which women's football was reactivated at the club. In the 2024 season, Carla became the athlete who played the most times for São Paulo, with 153 appearances.

== Honours ==
Grêmio

- Campeonato Gaúcho Feminino: 2018

São Paulo

- Campeonato Brasileiro Série A1: 2026
- Campeonato Brasileiro Série A2: 2019
- Brasil Ladies Cup: 2021
- Supercopa do Brasil: 2025

Individual

- Bola de Prata: 2024
