= Maycon Cardozo =

Brazilian footballer (born 2008)

Personal information
- Full name: Maycon Douglas Normanha Cardozo
- Date of birth: 10 October 2008 (age 18)
- Place of birth: São Paulo, Brazil
- Height: 1.65 m (5 ft 5 in)
- Positions: Winger; wide midfielder; attacking midfielder

Team information
- Current team: Bayern Munich
- Number: 49

Youth career
- 2018–2019: Ratchaburi
- 2019–2021: Sodsee academy
- 2021–2023: Chainat Hornbill
- 2023–2024: BCC
- 2025–2026: Bayern Munich

Senior career*
Years	Team	Apps	(Gls)
2026–	Bayern Munich II	7	(2)
2026–	Bayern Munich	2	(0)
- * Club domestic league appearances and goals as of 23:45, 29 August 2026 (UTC)

Maycon Douglas Normanha Cardozo (born 10 October 2008) is a Brazilian professional footballer who plays as a winger, wide midfielder and attacking midfielder for Bundesliga club Bayern Munich.

== Early and personal life ==
Cardozo is the son of former professional footballer Douglas Rodrigues. Born in Brazil, he moved to Thailand at two years old when his father relocated to play in the Thai League 1. Raised across various Thai provinces, including Buriram, Ratchaburi, Saraburi, Chainat, and Bangkok, he became fluent in reading, writing, and speaking Thai.

His twin sister, Yasmim, is also a footballer; she previously played for Paris Saint-Germain's youth setup and represented the Brazil U17 team at the 2024 FIFA U-17 Women's World Cup, before joining Flamengo.

At the age of nine, Cardozo featured in the TV show Super 10, a talent show where children showcase their abilities in their chosen medium. Having spent most of his childhood in Thailand, he publicly expressed his desire to represent the Thailand national football team; however, he remains ineligible under Thai nationality laws as neither of his parents holds Thai citizenship nor was he born in the country. He later made a return appearance on Super 10 as a special guest following his progression into the Bayern Munich youth system, showcasing his football skills as a U19 player.

== Club career ==
=== Early career in Thailand ===
As a result of his father's career, he moved to Thailand at the age of two. Having taken an interest in football from the age of four, he joined the academy of Ratchaburi while his father was serving as assistant manager for the club, with his performances for the under-10 team noted in Thai media. He also played for the Sports Thai Bavaria (STB) Academy in Bangkok, as well as representing Chainat Hornbill from 2021; helping them win the 2022–23 FA Thailand Youth League. His last club in Thailand was the Bangkok Christian College.

=== Bayern Munich ===
In May 2024, Cardozo was invited by German Bundesliga side Bayern Munich to be part of their World Squad initiative, representing the club in international friendlies. Initially, he was not accepted on the programme due to his young age, but he ended up replacing another player who dropped out at the last minute due to injury. He started well with the World Squad, scoring eight goals, including two against Bayern Munich's youth team. These performances drew praise from Bayern Munich coach Roy Makaay, who told Cardozo that "if you keep developing like this, you can become a professional", also tipping him to sign for Bayern's youth team.

Cardozo signed for Bayern Munich in February 2025, penning a two-year deal. In doing so, he became the first player to sign directly to Bayern Munich via the World Squad programme. He was one of the players that were called up by Bayern Munich head coach Vincent Kompany for the last 2025 pre-season friendly match against Red Eagles Austria on 23 August 2025, for which he started during a 3–1 win. Cardozo was called up for the 5–0 win friendly match against Austrian Bundesliga club Red Bull Salzburg on 6 January 2026, substituting Lennart Karl at the 89th minute.

He made his professional debut with Bayern Munich II on 24 February 2026, starting for a 1–0 home win Regionalliga Bayern match against SpVgg Unterhaching. On 4 March 2026, Cardozo signed a long-term extension contract with Bayern Munich. Two days later he made his debut with the Bayern Munich senior team, substituting Luis Díaz at the 61st minute, during a 4–1 home win Bundesliga match against Borussia Mönchengladbach, on 6 March. Four days later, Cardozo scored his first professional goal on 10 March, during a 2–0 home win Regionalliga Bayern match against FC Augsburg II.

In April 2026, English Premier League club Manchester United showed interest in recruiting him.

== International career ==
As well as being able to represent Brazil, Cardozo is half Portuguese. During his early career, he was touted in Thai media to potentially represent the South-East Asian nation at international level, however Thailand under-14 coach Salva Valero confirmed in 2019 that he did not have a Thai passport, and with Thai law only allowing for naturalisation at the age of twenty, it was unlikely that Cardozo would represent the War Elephants at international level. Cardozo himself has stated that he would like to represent both Brazil and Thailand at international level.

== Career statistics ==
As of match played 29 August 2026

Appearances and goals by club, season and competition
Club	Season	League			Cup		Europe		Other		Total	
Club	Season	Division	Apps	Goals	Apps	Goals	Apps	Goals	Apps	Goals	Apps	Goals
Bayern Munich II	2025–26	Regionalliga Bayern	5	2	—		—		—		5	2
Bayern Munich II	2026–27	Regionalliga Bayern	2	0	—		—		—		2	0
Bayern Munich	2025–26	Bundesliga	2	0	0	0	0	0	0	0	2	0
Bayern Munich	2026–27	Bundesliga	0	0	0	0	0	0	0	0	0	0
Career total			9	2	0	0	0	0	0	0	9	2

== Style of play ==
Cardozo plays mainly as a winger on both sides, and he has occasionally played as an attacking midfielder and wide midfielder, as well as a wing-back and full-back.

== Honours ==
Bayern Munich

- Bundesliga: 2025–26
- Franz Beckenbauer Supercup: 2026
