= Robinha =

Brazilian footballer

Personal information
- Full name: Rayane Rodrigues da Silva
- Date of birth: 21 January 1995 (age 31)
- Place of birth: Brasília, Brazil
- Position: Midfielder

Team information
- Current team: São Paulo
- Number: 95

Senior career*
Years	Team	Apps	(Gls)
2018–2021	Minas Brasília	43	(4)
2022	Cruzeiro	13	(0)
2023–	São Paulo	23	(0)
- * Club domestic league appearances and goals as of 17 March 2025

Rayane Rodrigues da Silva (born 21 January 1995), better known as Robinha, is a Brazilian professional women's footballer who plays as a midfielder for São Paulo.

== Career ==
Born in Brasília, Robinha began her career playing for futsal teams, playing among boys. In 2018, she received her first chance in professional women's football, becoming champion with Minas Brasília, where she remained until 2021. In 2022 season she played for Cruzeiro EC and in 2023 she joined São Paulo FC.

On 16 March 2025, Robinha gained prominence for being the player to take the last penalty shoot-out in the Supercopa do Brasil final, against SC Corinthians, marking this as the first title for the top-tier professional team of the São Paulo FC women's team since its reactivation.

== Honours ==
Minas Brasília

- Campeonato Brasiliense Feminino: 2018
- Campeonato Brasileiro de Futebol Feminino Série A2: 2018

São Paulo

- Campeonato Brasileiro Série A1: 2026
- Supercopa do Brasil: 2025
