= Yasmim Cardozo =

Portuguese footballer (born 2008)

Personal information
- Full name: Yasmim Normanha Cardozo
- Date of birth: 10 October 2008 (age 18)
- Place of birth: Brazil
- Position: Midfielder

Team information
- Current team: Flamengo

Youth career
- 2024-2025: Paris Saint-Germain FC
- Flamengo

Senior career*
Years	Team	Apps	(Gls)
–2024	Phranakorn FC		
2026–	Flamengo	1	(0)

International career
2024	Brazil U17	1	(0)
2026-	Portugal U18	2	(0)
- * Club domestic league appearances and goals

Yasmim Normanha Cardozo (born 10 October 2008) is a professional footballer who plays as a midfielder for Flamengo. Born in Brazil, she has represented Brazil and Portugal internationally at youth level.

== Early life ==
Cardozo was born on 10 October 2008 in Brazil. The daughter of Brazilian footballer Douglas Rodrigues, she is the twin sister of Brazilian footballer Maycon Cardozo.

== Club career ==
Cardozo started her career with Thai side Phranakorn FC. Following her stint there, she joined the youth academy of Brazilian side Flamengo and was promoted to the club's senior team in 2026.

== Style of play ==
Cardozo plays as a midfielder. Right-footed, she has received comparisons to Brazil international Formiga.

== International career ==
Yasmim Cardozo represented Brazil at under-17 level. She was selected for the 2024 FIFA U-17 Women's World Cup, but was replaced after sustaining an injury in training. She was playing for Paris Saint-Germain FC.

She then represented Portugal at the under-18 level in 2026 against Sweden, where she played two matches. In May 2026, she was called up again to the U18 team for two.

== Honours ==
- Campeonato Brasileiro Feminino Sub-20 (1): 2026
