= Bruna Calderan =

Brazilian footballer (born 1996)

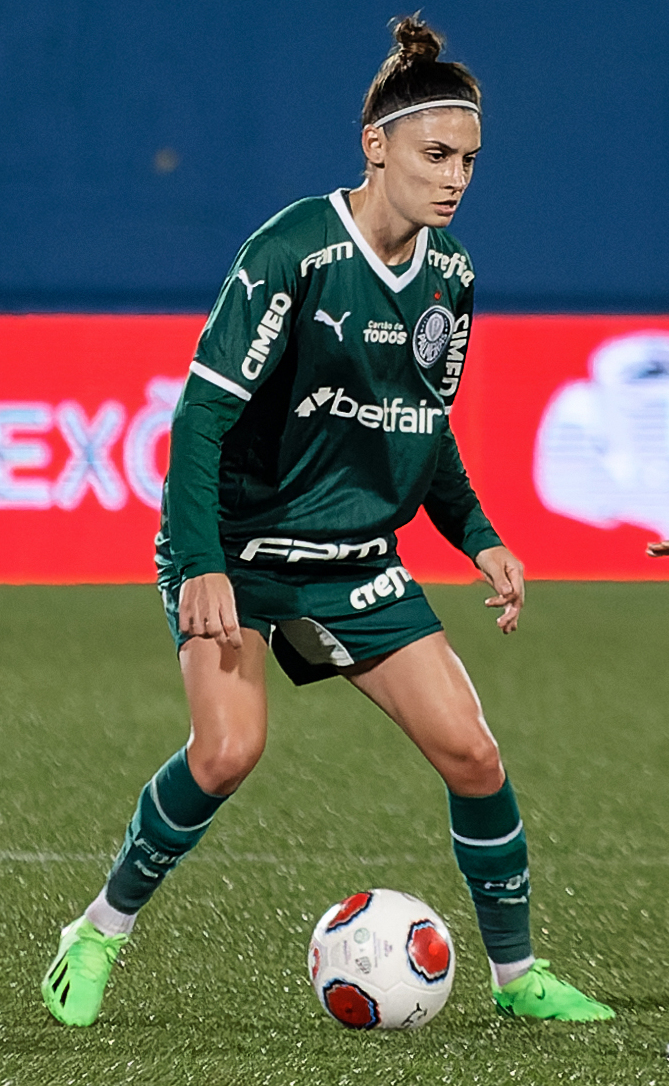
- Calderan playing for Palmeiras

Personal information
- Full name: Bruna Rafagnin Calderan
- Date of birth: 12 September 1996 (age 30)
- Place of birth: Sananduva, Brazil
- Height: 1.67 m (5 ft 6 in)
- Position: Right back

Team information
- Current team: São Paulo
- Number: 2

Senior career*
Years	Team	Apps	(Gls)
- Chapecoense
- Criciúma
- Itajaí
2016	Iranduba	7	(0)
2017–2020	Kindermann–Avaí	50	(11)
2021–2024	Palmeiras	62	(4)
2025–	São Paulo		

International career^{‡}
2016	Brazil U20	3	(0)
2019–	Brazil	1	(0)
- * Club domestic league appearances and goals as of 1 February 2025 ‡ National team caps and goals as of 1 February 2025

Bruna Rafagnin Calderan (born 12 September 1996), sometimes known as just Bruna, is a Brazilian footballer who plays as a right back for São Paulo and the Brazil women's national team.

Bruna started her career at Chapecoense, and played for Criciúma and Itajaí before joining Iranduba. She began to establish herself at Kindermann–Avaí before joining Palmeiras. She has won the best right-back award in both 2020 and 2021, and was the most capped player for Palmeiras before being overtaken. In 2025, she joined São Paulo.

== Career ==
Bruna Rafagnin Calderan was born in Sananduva, Brazil. In Sananduva, she began playing futsal, and was the only girl playing on the courts. She later moved to Esporte Clube Iranduba da Amazônia and in 2017, joined Sociedade Esportiva Kindermann. In June 2017, she scored against her former club Iranduba, scoring a penalty.

On 28 January 2021, Bruna Calderan was announced at SE Palmeiras, along with Julia Bianchi and Duda Santos. Whilst playing for Palmeiras, Bruna Calderan was named the best right-back in the Craque do Brasileirão award in 2020. She won the same award for the second year in a row in 2021. She left the club in 2023, leaving the club as the player with the most appearances in the history of the club, a record that has since been surpassed.

On 4 January 2025, Bruna Calderan was announced at São Paulo on a contract lasting until 31 December 2026.

== International career ==
In December 2025, Bruna was part of the Brazil women's national under-20 football team that won the 2015 South American U-20 Championship.

Bruna represented Brazil at the 2016 FIFA U-20 Women's World Cup. She made her senior debut in 2019, against Mexico women's national football team.

== Honours ==
Iranduba

- Campeonato Amazonense: 2016

Kindermann

- Campeonato Catarinense: 2017, 2018, 2019

Palmeiras

- Copa Libertadores: 2022
- Copa Paulista Feminina: 2021
- Campeonato Paulista de Futebol Feminino: 2022

São Paulo

- Supercopa do Brasil: 2025

Brazil U20

- South American U-20 Women's Championship: 2015
