= Douglas Rodrigues (footballer) =

Brazilian footballer (born 1982)

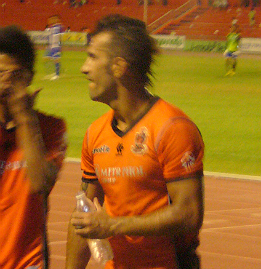

Personal information
- Full name: Douglas Freitas Cardozo Rodrigues
- Date of birth: 16 March 1982 (age 44)
- Place of birth: Santo André, Brazil
- Height: 1.74 m (5 ft 9 in)
- Position: Striker

Youth career
- 2001: Santos

Senior career*
Years	Team	Apps	(Gls)
2002–2005	Santos	35	(8)
2004	→ Goiás (loan)	11	(1)
2006–2007	Chiasso	19	(5)
2007	→ Elche (loan)	10	(0)
2007	Widzew Łódź	4	(0)
2008	Varese	10	(1)
2009	Guaratinguetá	8	(0)
2009	Atlético Sorocaba		
2010	Uberaba	9	(2)
2010	Buriram PEA	11	(6)
2011	Buriram	31	(15)
2012–2014	Ratchaburi	56	(29)
2015	Saraburi	10	(2)
2015	PTT Rayong	21	(4)
2016	Bangkok	16	(9)
2021	Navy	17	(9)
2021–2022	Chainat Hornbill	28	(9)
2022–2023	Ratchaburi	0	(0)

Managerial career
- 2023: Ratchaburi
- 2023–2024: DP Kanchanaburi
- * Club domestic league appearances and goals

Douglas Freitas Cardozo Rodrigues (born 16 March 1982), known as Douglas Rodrigues or just Douglas, is a Brazilian football manager and former player who played as a striker.

== Club career ==
He joined Chiasso in February 2006 before signing for Widzew Łódź in Poland in June 2007. In December 2008, he moved back to Brazil to play for Guaratinguetá, signing a deal until June 2010.

== Personal life ==
His son Maycon Cardozo signed with Bayern Munich under-17 in Germany on 1 January 2025. His daughter Yasmim Cardozo signed with CR Flamengo in Brazil.

== Managerial statistics ==
As of match played 7 February 2024

Managerial record by team and tenure
Team	Nat	From	To	Record				
Team	Nat	From	To	G	W	D	L	Win %
Ratchaburi	(Thailand)	11 May 2023	23 June 2023	1	0	0	1	0.00
DP Kanchanaburi	(Thailand)	20 June 2023	7 February 2024	27	9	7	11	33.33
Total				28	9	7	12	32.14

== Honours ==
Santos

- Campeonato Brasileiro Série A: 2002

Buriram

- Thai Division 1 League: 2011
