= Taty (footballer) =

Brazilian footballer (born 1996)

Personal information
- Full name: Tatiely Cristina Sena das Neves
- Date of birth: 11 August 1996 (age 30)
- Place of birth: Salvador, Bahia, Brazil
- Height: 1.69 m (5 ft 7 in)
- Position: Midfielder

Senior career*
Years	Team	Apps	(Gls)
2016	EC Vitória	1	(0)
2017	São Francisco	11	(0)
2017	Caucaia		
2018	Vitória das Tabocas	12	(2)
2019	EC Vitória	12	(1)
2019–2021	Torreense		
2021–2022	Puskás Akadémia		
2022–2023	Pomigliano	24	(7)
2023–2024	Sampdoria	22	(4)
- * Club domestic league appearances and goals as of 03:54, 28 April 2024 (UTC)

Tatiely Cristina Sena das Neves (born 11 August 1996), better known as Taty or Tatiely Cristina, is a Brazilian footballer who plays as a midfielder. She has previously played for Italian Serie A clubs Sampdoria and Pomigliano.

== Career ==
=== First spell at EC Vitória ===
Taty made her league debut against São José on 4 February 2016.

=== São Francisco ===
Taty made her league debut against Corinthians on 12 March 2017.

=== Vitória das Tabocas ===
Taty made her league debut against Portuguesa on 9 March 2018. She scored her first league goal against Flamengo on 11 July 2018, scoring in the 73rd minute.

=== Second spell at EC Vitória ===
During her second spell, Taty made her league debut against Osasco Audax on 16 March 2019. She scored her first goal against Sport Recife on 18 April 2019, scoring a penalty in the 77th minute.

=== Pomigliano ===
Taty was announced at Pomigliano. She scored on her league debut against Sampdoria on 11 September 2022, scoring in the 10th minute.

Taty also scored against Parma on 22 October 2022, scoring in the 19th minute.

=== Sampdoria ===
Taty made her league debut against Inter Milan on 17 September 2023. She scored her first league goal against Juventus on 1 October 2023, scoring a penalty in the 51st minute.
