= Piccinato =

Piccinato is a surname. Notable people with the surname include:

- Luigi Piccinato (1899–1983), Italian architect and town planner
- Lucas Piccinato (born 1990), Brazilian football coach
- Jeniffer Piccinato (born 1996), Brazilian actress and model
