= Campeonato Brasileiro Feminino Sub-17 =

Official Brazilian national football tournament for U-17 teams

- Founded: 2019
- Country: Brazil
- Current champions: Corinthians; 2nd title (2025)
- Most championships: Internacional (3 titles)
- Broadcaster(s): SporTV

The Campeonato Brasileiro Feminino Sub-17, is the official Brazilian national football tournament for U-17 women's teams. From 2019 to 2021 it was disputed as Sub-16 (under-16) category.

== List of champions ==
Following there are all the championship editions:

=== Sub-16 (Under-16) ===
Year	Champion	Runners-up
2019	São Paulo; SP	Santos; SP
2020	Internacional; RS	Minas Brasília; DF
2021	Corinthians; SP	Internacional; RS

=== Sub-17 (Under-17) ===
Year	Champion	Runners-up
2022	Internacional; RS	Santos; SP
2023	Grêmio; RS	Flamengo; RJ
2024	Internacional; RS	Grêmio; RS
2025	Corinthians; SP	Grêmio; RS

== Titles by club ==
Titles	Club
3	Internacional
2	Corinthians
1	Grêmio
1	São Paulo

== See also ==
- Campeonato Brasileiro Feminino
- Campeonato Brasileiro Feminino Sub-20
