= Michelle (footballer) =

Brazilian footballer (born 1989)

Personal information
- Full name: Michelle Christina Cerqueira Gomes Lopes
- Date of birth: 24 November 1989 (age 36)
- Place of birth: Rio de Janeiro, Brazil
- Height: 1.74 m (5 ft 9 in)
- Position: Goalkeeper

Team information
- Current team: São Paulo
- Number: 24

Youth career
- 2000–2003: Geração 2000
- 2004–2009: Team Chicago Brasil

Senior career*
Years	Team	Apps	(Gls)
2010	Keynsham Town		
2011	BSC Wildcats Freiamt		
2012	America-RJ		
2013–2014	Foz Cataratas	5	(0)
2015–2021	Santos	49	(0)
2016–2017	→ Hapoel Ironi Petah Tikva (loan)	24	(0)
2022–	São Paulo	0	(0)
- * Club domestic league appearances and goals as of 21:13, 22 December 2021 (UTC)

Michelle Christina Cerqueira Gomes Lopes (born 21 November 1989), simply known as Michelle, is a Brazilian footballer who plays as a goalkeeper for São Paulo.

== Career ==
Born in Rio de Janeiro, Michelle finished her graduation with Team Chicago Brasil, and made her senior debut with English side Keynsham Town in 2010. In 2012, after representing Swiss side BSC Wildcats Freiamt in the previous year, she returned to her home country and played for America-RJ.

In 2013, Michelle joined Foz Cataratas and won two Campeonato Paranaense titles with the side. She moved to Santos for the 2015 campaign, initially as a backup to Dani Neuhaus.

In 2016, Michelle was loaned to Israeli club Maccabi Petah Tikva, but returned to Sereias da Vila in 2017 and subsequently became a starter for the side.

== Honours ==
Foz Cataratas

- Campeonato Paranaense de Futebol Feminino: 2013, 2014

Santos

- Campeonato Brasileiro de Futebol Feminino Série A1: 2017
- Campeonato Paulista de Futebol Feminino: 2018
- Copa Paulista: 2020
