= CT da Barra Funda =

Football club training ground

Centro de Treinamento Frederico Antonio Germano Menzen
- CT da Barra Funda
- Interactive map of Centro de Treinamento Frederico Antonio Germano Menzen
- Location: Barra Funda, São Paulo; Brazil
- Coordinates: 23.51586217426029°S 46.68593565995218°W
- Owner: Municipality of São Paulo
- Type: Football training ground

Construction
- Opened: 1988

Tenant
- São Paulo FC (training) (1988-)

Website
- CT Barra Funda

The CT da Barra Funda (Centro de Treinamento Frederico Antonio Germano Menzen) is the training ground of the football club São Paulo FC. Is located at the Barra Funda district, in the city of São Paulo, and it has a total area of 44,472m².

It is the training ground for the professional team of São Paulo, while the football academy base has been located at the CFA Cotia since 2006.

== History ==
During the tenure of mayor Reynaldo de Barros (1979–1982), the city hall of São Paulo was tasked with distributing new training sites to the main clubs in the city. For São Paulo FC, a land located in the Tietê River floodplain was granted. The drainage system was built between August 1983 and April 1984. The foundations were prepared from April to June of the same year.

Full inaugurated in 9 April 1988, and its served too as a ground for training games, youth teams and for the women's team matches.

In 1991, nine years later, SE Palmeiras was granted by the Municipality with a land immediately next to the CT da Barra Funda, where was it built the "Academia de Futebol" that remains until today as a neighbor.

On the other side of Avenida Marques de São Vicente (English: Marques de São Vicente avenue), the Estádio Nicolau Alayon of traditional club Nacional is located.

For 2014 FIFA World Cup, its served as main training field for the United States national soccer team.

== Facilities ==
- Main football pitch (108 x 72 metres), with capacity for 704 supporters
- 2 additional pitches (100 x 65 metres)
- Medical department (REFFIS)
- Apartment building with 20 double suits
- Industrial kitchen building
- Press area (Sala José Porphyrio da Paz)
- Auditorium (Auditório Telê Santana)
- Car parking with 164 slots
- Indoor pool
- Sports court
- Beach soccer field
