= 2025 Supercopa do Brasil de Futebol Feminino =

2025 Supercopa Feminina
2025 Supercopa do Brasil de Futebol Feminino

Tournament details
- Dates: 7–15 March
- Teams: 8

Final positions
- Champions: São Paulo (1st title)
- Runners-up: Corinthians

Tournament statistics
- Matches played: 7
- Goals scored: 14 (2 per match)
- Top goal scorer(s): Andressa Alves; Victória (2 goals each)

The 2025 Supercopa do Brasil de Futebol Feminino (officially the Supercopa Feminina Betano 2025 for sponsorship reasons) was the fourth edition of the Supercopa do Brasil de Futebol Feminino football competition. It was held between 7 and 15 March 2025.

São Paulo defeated Corinthians 4–3 on penalties to win their first title after a 0–0 draw in the final.

== Format ==
The teams competed in a single-elimination tournament. All stages were played on a single-leg basis. In the event of a tie, a penalty shoot-out would determine the winners. The draw determined the home team for the quarter-finals, while for the semi-finals and final, the higher-seeded team hosted the match.

Starting from the semi-finals, the teams were seeded according to their performance in the tournament. The teams were ranked according to overall points. If tied on overall points, the following criteria would be used to determine the ranking: 1. Overall wins; 2. Overall goal difference; 3. Overall goals scored; 4. Fewest red cards in the tournament; 5. Fewest yellow cards in the tournament; 6. Best 2025 Women's Club Ranking.

== Qualified teams ==
The competition were contested by 8 teams. The teams were chosen between the top twelve teams of the 2024 Campeonato Brasileiro de Futebol Feminino Série A1 and the top four teams of the 2024 Campeonato Brasileiro de Futebol Feminino Série A2 choosing only one team for state. If necessary, a state would gain a second berth according to its 2025 Women's State CBF Ranking position.

Teams in bold qualified for the competition.

Position (tournament)	Team	State	Status	Status (2nd berth)
Champions (Série A1)	**Corinthians**	São Paulo	Qualified	N/A
Runners-up (Série A1)	**São Paulo**	São Paulo	Not eligible	Qualified
3rd place (Série A1)	Ferroviária	São Paulo	Not eligible	Not eligible
4th place (Série A1)	Palmeiras	São Paulo	Not eligible	Not eligible
5th place (Série A1)	**Cruzeiro**	Minas Gerais	Qualified	N/A
6th place (Série A1)	**Grêmio**	Rio Grande do Sul	Qualified	N/A
7th place (Série A1)	Internacional	Rio Grande do Sul	Not eligible	Not qualified
8th place (Série A1)	Red Bull Bragantino	São Paulo	Not eligible	Not eligible
9th place (Série A1)	**Flamengo**	Rio de Janeiro	Qualified	N/A
10th place (Série A1)	América Mineiro	Minas Gerais	Not eligible	Not qualified
11th place (Série A1)	Fluminense	Rio de Janeiro	Not eligible	Not qualified
12th place (Série A1)	**Real Brasília**	Distrito Federal	Qualified	N/A
Champions (Série A2)	**Bahia**	Bahia	Qualified	N/A
Runners-up (Série A2)	3B da Amazônia^{[a]}	Amazonas	—	—
3rd place (Série A2)	Juventude	Rio Grande do Sul	Not eligible	Not eligible
4th place (Série A2)	**Sport**	Pernambuco	Qualified	N/A

2025 Women's State Ranking (2nd berth)
Rank	State
1	São Paulo
2	Rio de Janeiro
3	Minas Gerais
4	Rio Grande do Sul
5	Distrito Federal
6	Amazonas
7	Santa Catarina
8	Bahia
9	Ceará
10	Paraná
11	Pará
12	Paraíba
⋮
27	Rio Grande do Norte

Source:CBF

^{a} 3B da Amazônia declined to participate in the Supercopa Feminina.

== Draw ==
The draw was held on 12 February 2025, 15:30 at CBF headquarters in Rio de Janeiro. The 8 qualified teams were drawn in a single group (2025 Women's Club Ranking shown in parentheses).

Group
- (São Paulo (state)) Corinthians (1)
- (São Paulo (state)) São Paulo (3)
- (Rio Grande do Sul) Grêmio (7)
- (Rio de Janeiro (state)) Flamengo (8)
- (Minas Gerais) Cruzeiro (9)
- (Federal District (Brazil)) Real Brasília (11)
- Bahia (14)
- (Pernambuco) Sport (27)

== Bracket ==
Quarter-finals
(Pernambuco) Sport	0
(São Paulo (state)) São Paulo	4
(Federal District (Brazil)) Real Brasília	1
(Rio de Janeiro (state)) Flamengo	3
(Rio Grande do Sul) Grêmio	0
(São Paulo (state)) Corinthians	3
Bahia	0
(Minas Gerais) Cruzeiro	1

Semi-finals
(São Paulo (state)) São Paulo	1
(Rio de Janeiro (state)) Flamengo	0
(São Paulo (state)) Corinthians	1
(Minas Gerais) Cruzeiro	0

Final
(São Paulo (state)) São Paulo	0 (4)
(São Paulo (state)) Corinthians	0 (3)

== Quarter-finals ==
Team 1	Score	Team 2
Bahia	0–1	(Minas Gerais) Cruzeiro
Grêmio (Rio Grande do Sul)	0–3	(São Paulo (state)) Corinthians
Sport (Pernambuco)	0–4	(São Paulo (state)) São Paulo
Real Brasília (Federal District (Brazil))	1–3	(Rio de Janeiro (state)) Flamengo

=== Group A ===
8 March 2025
19:00

Bahia	0–1	(Minas Gerais) Cruzeiro
	Report	Letícia Ferreira 32'

Estádio Municipal Antônio de Figueiredo Carneiro, Alagoinhas
Referee: Deborah Cecilia Cruz Correia (Pernambuco)

=== Group B ===
9 March 2025
16:00

Grêmio (Rio Grande do Sul)	0–3	(São Paulo (state)) Corinthians
	Report	Victória 43'; Andressa Alves 45+1', 57'

Arena do Grêmio, Porto Alegre
Referee: Rejane Caetano da Silva (Rio de Janeiro)

=== Group C ===
7 March 2025
21:30

Sport (Pernambuco)	0–4	(São Paulo (state)) São Paulo
	Report	Giovanna Crivelari 3'; Bia Menezes 58'; Karla Alves 76' (pen.); Bruna Calderan 81'

Estádio Ilha do Retiro, Recife
Referee: Ruthyanna Camila Medeiros da Silva (Paraíba)

=== Group D ===
9 March 2025
16:00

Real Brasília (Federal District (Brazil))	1–3	(Rio de Janeiro (state)) Flamengo
Luciene Baião 77' (pen.)	Report	Jucinara 28'; Cristiane 37'; Laysa 87'

Bezerrão, Gama
Referee: Marianna Nanni Batalha (São Paulo)

== Semi-finals ==
=== Semi-finals seedings ===
Pos	Team	Pld	W	D	L	GF	GA	GD	Pts	Host
2	(São Paulo (state)) Corinthians	1	1	0	0	3	0	+3	3	Host
4	(Minas Gerais) Cruzeiro	1	1	0	0	1	0	+1	3	
1	(São Paulo (state)) São Paulo	1	1	0	0	4	0	+4	3	Host
3	(Rio de Janeiro (state)) Flamengo	1	1	0	0	3	1	+2	3	

Source: CBF

Team 1	Score	Team 2
Corinthians (São Paulo (state))	1–0	(Minas Gerais) Cruzeiro
São Paulo (São Paulo (state))	1–0	(Rio de Janeiro (state)) Flamengo

=== Group E ===
12 March 2025
19:00

Corinthians (São Paulo (state))	1–0	(Minas Gerais) Cruzeiro
Victória 83' (pen.)	Report

Estádio 1º de Maio, São Bernardo do Campo
Referee: Charly Wendy Straub Deretti (Santa Catarina)

=== Group F ===
12 March 2025
16:00

São Paulo (São Paulo (state))	1–0	(Rio de Janeiro (state)) Flamengo
Kaká 57'	Report

Estádio Urbano Caldeira, Santos
Referee: Thayslane de Melo Costa (Sergipe)

== Final ==
=== Final seedings ===
Pos	Team	Pld	W	D	L	GF	GA	GD	Pts	Host
1	(São Paulo (state)) São Paulo	2	2	0	0	5	0	+5	6	Host
2	(São Paulo (state)) Corinthians	2	2	0	0	4	0	+4	6	

Source: CBF

Team 1	Score	Team 2
São Paulo (São Paulo (state))	0–0 (4–3 p)	(São Paulo (state)) Corinthians

=== Group G ===
15 March 2025
16:30

São Paulo (São Paulo (state))	0–0	(São Paulo (state)) Corinthians
	Report
Penalties
Karla Alves (penalty scored); Kaká (penalty scored); Aline Milene (penalty missed); Bruna Calderan (penalty scored); Robinha (penalty scored)	4–3	(penalty scored) Gabi Zanotti; (penalty missed) Victória; (penalty scored) Andressa Alves; (penalty scored) Mariza; (penalty missed) Robledo

MorumBIS, São Paulo
Attendance: 9,031
Referee: Thayslane de Melo Costa (Sergipe)

São Paulo	Corinthians

GK	12	(Brazil) Carlinha
DF	2	(Brazil) Bruna Calderan
DF	3	(Brazil) Kaká	(yellow card) 67'
DF	4	(Brazil) Day Silva
DF	23	(Brazil) Bia Menezes		(substituted off) 82'
MF	95	(Brazil) Robinha
MF	7	(Brazil) Aline Milene (c)	(yellow card) 51'
MF	10	(Brazil) Camilinha		(substituted off) 66'
FW	11	(Brazil) Dudinha		(substituted off) 82'
FW	19	(Brazil) Giovanna Crivelari		(substituted off) 67'
FW	77	(Brazil) Isa Guimarães		(substituted off) 90+1'
Substitutes:
GK	1	(Brazil) Anna Bia
GK	24	(Brazil) Júlia Kerolyn
DF	6	(Brazil) Jéssica Soares
DF	16	(Brazil) Carol Gil		(substituted on) 82'
DF	22	(Brazil) Ravena
MF	5	(Brazil) Karla Alves		(substituted on) 66'
MF	8	(Brazil) Maressa		(substituted on) 90+1'
MF	14	(Brazil) Ana Beatriz
MF	88	(Brazil) Duda Serrana		(substituted on) 67'
FW	17	(Brazil) Milena
FW	18	(Brazil) Késia		(substituted on) 82'
FW	21	(Brazil) Daiane
Coach:
(Brazil) Thiago Viana

GK	12	(Brazil) Lelê	(yellow card) 48'
DF	21	(Brazil) Paulinha		(substituted off) 46'
DF	20	(Brazil) Mariza
DF	4	(Brazil) Thaís Regina
DF	37	(Brazil) Tamires (c)		(substituted off) 70'
MF	5	(Brazil) Thaís Ferreira
MF	8	(Brazil) Vitória Yaya		(substituted off) 46'
MF	27	(Brazil) Duda Sampaio		(substituted off) 85'
MF	10	(Brazil) Gabi Zanotti
MF	17	(Brazil) Victória
FW	94	(Brazil) Ariel Godoi		(substituted off) 70'
Substitutes:
GK	1	(Brazil) Nicole
DF	2	(Brazil) Letícia Santos
DF	3	(Brazil) Letícia Teles
DF	22	(Brazil) Juliete		(substituted on) 70'
MF	19	(Brazil) Letícia Monteiro		(substituted on) 70'
MF	31	(Venezuela) Dayana Rodríguez
FW	7	(Colombia) Gisela Robledo		(substituted on) 85'
FW	9	(Brazil) Andressa Alves		(substituted on) 46'
FW	11	(Brazil) Eudimilla
FW	30	(Brazil) Jaqueline
FW	40	(Brazil) Jhonson
FW	77	(Brazil) Carol Nogueira		(substituted on) 46'
Coach:
(Brazil) Lucas Piccinato

*Camilinha (São Paulo) missed a penalty kick in the 49th minute.

Final MVP Award:
Robinha (São Paulo)

Assistant referees:
Neuza Back (São Paulo)
Daniella Coutinho Pinto (Bahia)
Fourth official:
Adeli Mara Monteiro (São Paulo)
Fifth official:
Veridiana Contiliani Bisco (São Paulo)
Video assistant referee:
Daiane Caroline Muniz dos Santos (São Paulo)
Assistant video assistant referees:
Lilian da Silva Fernandes Bruno (Rio de Janeiro)

Match rules

- 90 minutes.
- Penalty shoot-out if scores still level.
- Twelve named substitutes.
- Maximum of five substitutions.
