= 2025 Thai Women's League 2 =

Thai Women's League 2
- Season: 2025
- Dates: 1 February 2025 – 25 May 2025
- Champions: Nakhon Sawan
- Promoted: Nakhon Sawan; Burirat Academy
- Relegated: Arma & Masuk; Sisaket
- Matches: 56
- Goals: 194 (3.46 per match)
- Top goalscorer: (Thailand) Chutikan Kitikhun (10 goals; Khon Kaen Sports School)
- Best goalkeeper: (Thailand) Witchakon Thammachak (4 clean sheets; Nakhon Sawan) (Thailand) Chanikan Homhuanl (4 clean sheets; Burirat Academy)
- Biggest home win: 6 goals difference Arma & Masuk 8–2 Sisaket (24 May 2025)
- Biggest away win: 5 goals difference Arma & Masuk 0–5 Burirat Academy (1 February 2025)
- Highest scoring: 11 goals Bangkok Sports School 7–4 Sisaket (3 May 2025)
- Longest winning run: 6 matches Nakhon Sawan; Burirat Academy
- Longest unbeaten run: 10 matches PTU Tha Khlong
- Longest winless run: 9 matches Sisaket
- Longest losing run: 5 matches Sisaket

The 2025 Thai Women's League 2 is the 8th season of the Thai Women's League 2, the second-tier Thai professional league for women's association football clubs, since its establishment in 2010. A total of 8 teams will compete in the league.

== Teams ==
=== Number of teams by province ===
Position	Province	Number	Teams
1	Bangkok	2	Arma & Masuk and Bangkok Sports School
2	Buriram	1	Burirat Academy
2	Chonburi	1	Phranakorn
2	Khon Kaen	1	Khon Kaen Sports School
2	Nakhon Sawan	1	Nakhon Sawan
2	Pathum Thani	1	PTU Tha Khlong
2	Sisaket	1	Sisaket

=== Stadiums and locations ===
Locations of the 2025 Thai Women's League 2 teams

Team	Location	Stadium	Coordinates
Arma & Masuk	Bangkok (Thung Khru)	72nd Anniversary Stadium, Bang Mot	13°38′48″N 100°29′34″E
Bangkok Sports School	Bangkok (Thung Khru)	72nd Anniversary Stadium, Bang Mot	13°38′48″N 100°29′34″E
Burirat Academy	Buriram (Mueang)	Buriram City Stadium	14°56′45″N 103°06′12″E
Khon Kaen Sports School	Khon Kaen (Mueang)	Stadium of Khon Kaen Sports School	16°27′21″N 102°56′49″E
Nakhon Sawan	Nakhon Sawan (Mueang)	Stadium of Nakhon Sawan Sports School	15°44′33″N 100°07′57″E
Phranakorn	Chonburi (Mueang)	Chonburi Training Ground	13°24′35″N 100°59′44″E
PTU Tha Khlong	Pathum Thani (Thanyaburi)	Stadium of Rajamangala University of Technology Thanyaburi, Rangsit Campus	13°58′50″N 100°36′47″E
Sisaket	Sisaket (Mueang)	Stadium of Sisaket Sports School	15°06′14″N 104°20′17″E

=== Foreign players ===
A Thai Women's League 2 team could register 3 foreign players from foreign players all around the world. A team can use 3 foreign players on the field in each game.

Note :
(substituted off) : players who released during second leg transfer window;
(substituted on) : players who registered during second leg transfer window.

AFC member countries players.
CAF member countries players.
CONCACAF member countries players.
CONMEBOL member countries players.
OFC member countries players.
UEFA member countries players.
No foreign player registered.

Club	Leg	Player 1	Player 2	Player 3
Arma & Masuk	1st
Arma & Masuk	2nd
Bangkok Sports School	1st
Bangkok Sports School	2nd
Burirat Academy	1st
Burirat Academy	2nd
Khon Kaen Sports School	1st
Khon Kaen Sports School	2nd
Nakhon Sawan	1st
Nakhon Sawan	2nd
Phranakorn	1st	(United States) Maggie Wood	(United States) Sayako Ikeda
Phranakorn	2nd	(United States) Maggie Wood	(United States) Sayako Ikeda
PTU Tha Khlong	1st
PTU Tha Khlong	2nd
Sisaket	1st
Sisaket	2nd

== League table ==
=== Standings ===
Pos	Team	Pld	W	D	L	GF	GA	GD	Pts	Qualification or relegation
1	Nakhon Sawan (C, P)	14	9	2	3	25	15	+10	29	Promotion to 2026 Thai Women's League 1
2	Burirat Academy (P)	14	8	2	4	25	16	+9	26 (Note: Burirat Academy ahead on head-to-head record; Burirat Academy 3 pts (GD +1), Bangkok Sports School 3 pts (GD –1).)	Promotion to 2026 Thai Women's League 1
3	Bangkok Sports School	14	8	2	4	27	20	+7	26	
4	PTU Tha Khlong	14	7	4	3	28	21	+7	25	
5	Phranakorn	14	5	4	5	21	20	+1	19	
6	Khon Kaen Sports School	14	4	4	6	21	17	+4	16	
7	Arma & Masuk (R)	14	4	1	9	22	31	−9	13	Relegation to 2026 Thai Women's League 2 qualification
8	Sisaket (R)	14	1	1	12	25	54	−29	4	Relegation to 2026 Thai Women's League 2 qualification

Source: Thai League
Rules for classification: 1) Points; 2) Head-to-head points; 3) Head-to-head goal difference; 4) Head-to-head goal scored; 5) Overall goal difference; 6) Overall goal scored; 7) Fair play points; 8) Play-off without extra time).
(C) Champions; (P) Promoted; (R) Relegated

=== Positions by round ===
Team ╲ Round	1	2	3	4	5	6	7	8	9	10	11	12	13	14
Nakhon Sawan	2	4	5	3	4	6	3	2	2	2	2	1	1	1
Burirat Academy	1	1	1	1	1	1	1	1	1	1	1	2	3	2
Bangkok Sports School	4	3	2	2	2	2	4	3	4	4	4	4	4	3
PTU Tha Khlong	6	6	6	6	3	5	5	4	3	3	3	3	2	4
Phranakorn	3	2	4	4	5	3	2	5	5	5	5	5	5	5
Khon Kaen Sports School	5	5	3	5	6	4	6	6	6	6	6	6	6	6
Arma & Masuk	8	7	7	7	8	8	7	7	7	7	7	7	7	7
Sisaket	7	8	8	8	7	7	8	8	8	8	8	8	8	8

Source: Thai League
= Leader and promotion to 2026 Thai Women's League 1; = Promotion to 2026 Thai Women's League 1; = Relegation to 2026 Thai Women's League 2 qualification

=== Results by round ===
Team ╲ Round	1	2	3	4	5	6	7	8	9	10	11	12	13	14
Nakhon Sawan	W	L	D	W	L	D	W	W	W	W	W	W	L	W
Burirat Academy	W	W	W	W	W	W	L	L	D	D	W	L	L	W
Bangkok Sports School	D	W	W	D	W	L	L	W	L	W	L	W	W	W
PTU Tha Khlong	L	D	L	W	W	D	W	W	W	D	W	D	W	L
Phranakorn	W	D	D	D	L	W	W	L	D	L	W	W	L	L
Khon Kaen Sports School	D	D	W	L	L	W	L	L	D	W	L	D	W	L
Arma & Masuk	L	D	L	L	L	L	W	W	L	L	L	L	W	W
Sisaket	L	L	L	L	W	L	L	L	D	L	L	L	L	L

Source: Thai League
W = Won; D = Drawn; L = Lost

=== Results ===
Home \ Away	AAM	BKS	BRA	KKS	NSW	PNK	PTK	SKT
Arma & Masuk	—	2–3	0–5	1–4	0–1	1–2	1–4	8–2
Bangkok Sports School	2–0	—	1–3	2–1	3–1	0–1	2–1	7–4
Burirat Academy	1–2	0–1	—	1–0	2–1	1–0	3–1	3–2
Khon Kaen Sports School	4–2	0–0	1–2	—	0–3	0–0	1–1	4–0
Nakhon Sawan	1–0	2–1	2–0	1–0	—	3–3	0–0	4–2
Phranakorn	1–2	1–1	3–2	1–1	0–1	—	3–1	4–3
PTU Tha Khlong	1–1	1–0	2–2	3–1	3–2	1–0	—	6–4
Sisaket	0–2	3–4	0–0	0–4	1–3	3–2	1–3	—

Source: Thai League
Legend: Blue = home team win; Yellow = draw; Red = away team win.
For upcoming matches, an "a" indicates there is an article about the rivalry between the two participants.

== Season statistics ==
=== Top scorers ===
As of 25 May 2025.

Rank	Player	Club	Goals
1	(Thailand) Chutikan Kitikhun	Khon Kaen Sports School	10
2	(Thailand) Alisa Rukpinij	PTU Tha Khlong	9
3	(Thailand) Bencharat Suriyan	Bangkok Sports School	8
4	(Thailand) Rungnapa Tonthuen	Nakhon Sawan	7
4	(Thailand) Pornthipa Thonglue	Sisaket	7
6	(Thailand) Kessirin Pametho	Burirat Academy	6
6	(Thailand) Jantima Chotirat	Nakhon Sawan	6
6	(Thailand) Thanyarat Butrobon	Nakhon Sawan	6

=== Hat-tricks ===
Player	For	Against	Result	Date
(Thailand) Chutikan Kitikhun	Khon Kaen Sports School	Arma & Masuk	4–1 (A)	2 March 2025
(Thailand) Alisa Rukpinij	PTU Tha Khlong	Sisaket	6–4 (H)	5 March 2025
(Thailand) Pornthipa Thonglue	Sisaket	Bangkok Sports School	4–7 (A)	3 May 2025
(Thailand) Chutikan Kitikhun	Khon Kaen Sports School	Arma & Masuk	4–2 (H)	4 May 2025
(Thailand) Alisa Rukpinij	PTU Tha Khlong	Nakhon Sawan	3–2 (H)	18 May 2025

Notes: (H) = Home team; (A) = Away team

=== Clean sheets ===
As of 25 May 2025.

Rank	Player	Club	Clean sheets
1	(Thailand) Chanikan Homhuanl	Burirat Academy	4
1	(Thailand) Witchakon Thammachak	Nakhon Sawan	4
3	(Thailand) Chonticha Panyarung	Khon Kaen Sports School	3
3	(Thailand) Wanatsanan Imthim	Nakhon Sawan	3
5	(Thailand) Phattharawadee Somta	Bangkok Sports School	2
5	(Thailand) Thanatcha Puangpara	Bangkok Sports School	2
5	(Thailand) Prima Owaki Nikornnarong	Phranakorn	2
5	(Thailand) Warittha Kaeosasaen	PTU Tha Khlong	2
