= Sananduva =

Municipality of Rio Grande do Sul, Brazil

Coordinates: 27°57′S 51°48′W

- Municipality
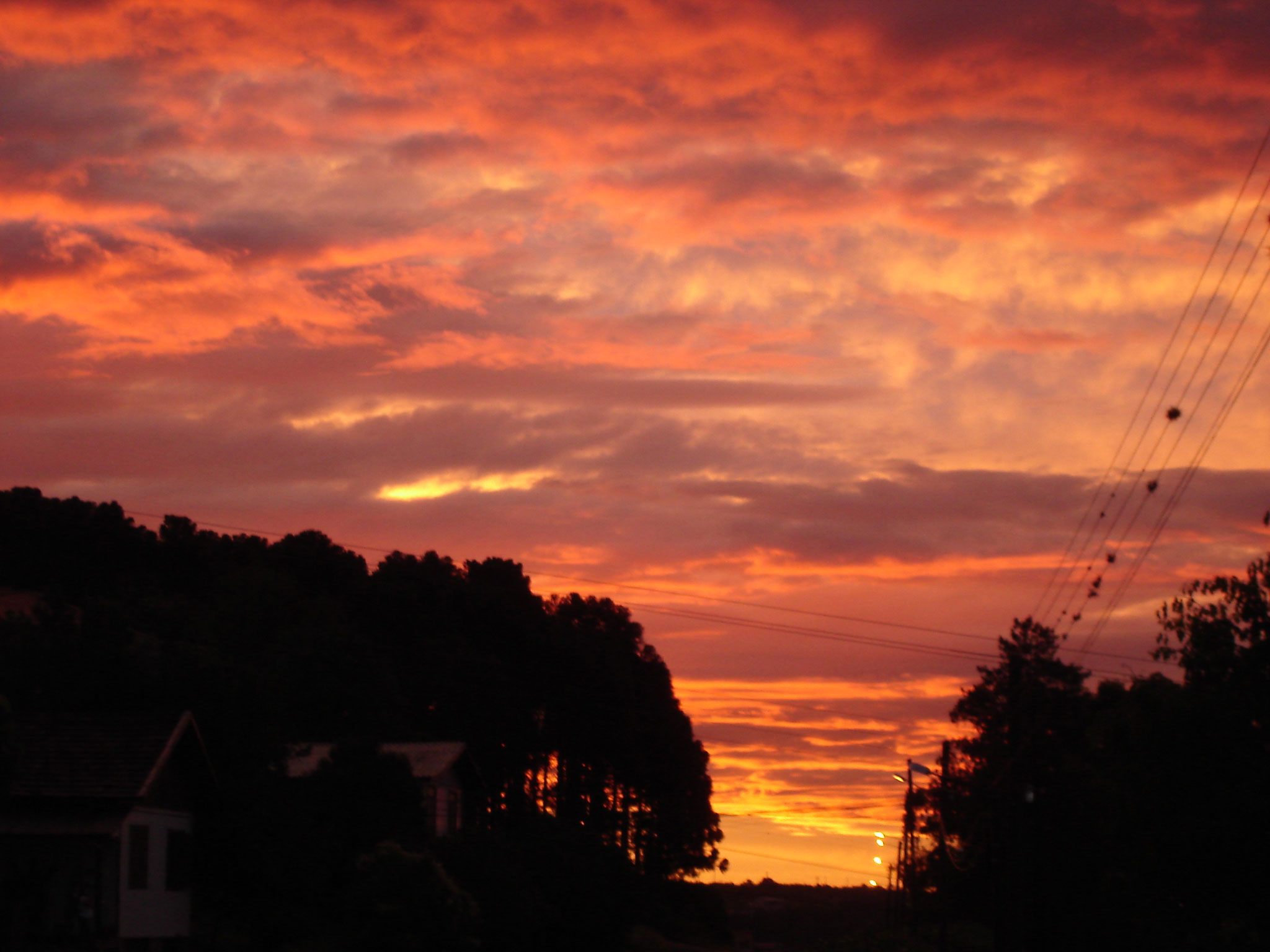

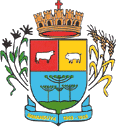
- Flag Coat of arms
- Interactive map of Sananduva
- Country: Brazil
- Region: South
- State: Rio Grande do Sul
- Micro-region: Sananduva
- Founded: October 22, 1997

Population
  - Total: 16,328
- Time zone: UTC−3 (BRT)
- Postal code: 99840-xxx
- Area/distance code: 54
- Distance from the capital: 590 km (370 mi)
- Website: sananduva.rs.gov.br

Sananduva is a municipality in the state of Rio Grande do Sul, Brazil. As of 2020, the estimated population was 16,328.

== See also ==
- List of municipalities in Rio Grande do Sul
