= São Paulo FC (women) =

Brazilian football club

São Paulo
- Full name: São Paulo Futebol Clube Futebol Feminino
- Nickname: Tricolor (Tricolour)
- Founded: 1983; 43 years ago 1997 (re-activated); 2005 (re-activated); 2015 (re-activated); 2019 (re-activated)
- Ground: CFA de Cotia (Estádio Marcelo Portugal Gouvêa); Estádio Bruno José Daniel (selected matches); Morumbi (selected matches)
- Head coach: Thiago Viana
- League: Campeonato Brasileiro Série A1; Campeonato Paulista
- 2025 2025: Série A1, 4th of 16; Paulista, 4th of 11
- Website: www.saopaulofc.net
Home colours	Away colours

São Paulo Futebol Clube, commonly known as São Paulo, is a professional women's association football club based in São Paulo, Brazil. Founded in 1997, the team is affiliated with Federação Paulista de Futebol and play their home games at Estádio do Morumbi. The team colors, reflected in their logo and uniform, are white, red and black. They play in the top tier of women's football in Brazil, the Campeonato Brasileiro de Futebol Feminino, and in the Campeonato Paulista de Futebol Feminino, the first division of the traditional in-state competition.

== History ==
=== First spell ===
The Brazilian Football Confederation (CBF) successfully encouraged São Paulo and its other leading clubs to form female teams after the national women's team's performance exceeded expectations at the 1996 Olympics. Coach Zé Duarte (who was also the Brazil women's national team coach) immediately assembled a competitive São Paulo team who won state and national titles in their debut 1997 season. The players had been co-opted from the existing successful women's team Saad Esporte Clube.

In 1998 the team only lost two matches but both defeats resulted in elimination from the state and national competitions at the hands of local rivals Portuguesa (who played as Lusa Sant'Anna). São Paulo rebounded to recapture the Paulista title in 1999. Eight of the 20-player Brazil squad at the 1999 FIFA Women's World Cup were contracted to São Paulo FC. In March 2000 the disbandment of the team was announced, as most of the leading Brazilian players signalled their intent to leave for the upcoming American Women's United Soccer Association.

=== Return ===
In 2015 São Paulo decided to return to women's football and reached the final of the Paulista, losing to São José. The team was disbanded again immediately afterwards when the parent club failed to attract adequate sponsorship. The team's coach Marcello Frigério said the team had been a partnership between São Paulo FC and the Centro de Apoio Profissional, Educacional e Social (CAPES), which failed when the latter did not pay in line with the agreement. Female football returned to São Paulo in 2017, when an under-17 youth team was launched in partnership with Centro Olímpico. Another adult team was put together in 2019, which included the high-profile signing of Cristiane Rozeira.

== Players ==
=== Current squad ===
As of 13 April 2026

Note: Flags indicate national team as defined under FIFA eligibility rules; some limited exceptions apply. Players may hold more than one non-FIFA nationality.

No.	Pos.	Nation	Player
1	GK	BRA	Anna Bia
2	DF	BRA	Bruna Calderan
3	DF	BRA	Carol Gil
4	DF	BRA	Tayla
5	MF	BRA	Karla Alves
6	DF	BRA	Clara
8	MF	BRA	Serrana
9	FW	BRA	Gadú
10	MF	BRA	Camilinha
11	FW	BRA	Isa
12	GK	BRA	Carlinha
13	MF	BRA	Cris
14	DF	BRA	Ana Beatriz
15	DF	PAR	Camila Barbosa
16	MF	ARG	Maricel Pereyra

No.	Pos.	Nation	Player
18	FW	BRA	Késia Sena
19	FW	BRA	Giovanna Crivelari
22	DF	BRA	Ravena
23	DF	BRA	Bia Menezes
24	FW	BRA	Soraya França
25	GK	BRA	Yasmin Souza
26	MF	ARG	Vanina Preininger
27	FW	BRA	Vitorinha
28	DF	BRA	Rafa Soares
33	DF	BRA	Luiza Calazans
66	FW	BRA	Anita Melo
72	FW	BRA	Mylena
93	GK	BRA	Elu Kavalek
95	MF	BRA	Robinha
99	MF	BRA	Vi Amaral

=== Former players ===
For details of current and former players, see Category:São Paulo FC (women) players.

==== Notable players ====
- Dudinha
- Formiga
- Kátia Cilene
- Sissi

== Managers ==
- Luiz Motta Filho (1983–1984)
- José Duarte (1997–1998)
- Edson Machado (1999–2000)
- José Carlos Carpinelli (2001)
- Sérgio Guerrero (2005)
- Marcello Frigério (2015)
- Lucas Piccinato (2019–2022)
- Thiago Viana (2023–present)

== Records ==
- Biggest win:
  - São Paulo 29–0 Taboão da Serra – 21 October 2020, Arena Barueri, 2020 Campeonato Paulista Feminino
- Player with most goals scored in a single game:
  - Kátia Cilene – 9 goals, São Paulo 13–0 USP – 20 May 1998, CT da Barra Funda, 1998 Campeonato Paulista Feminino
- Player with most goals scored:
  - Kátia Cilene – 177 goals
- Player with most goals scored per game ratio:
  - Kátia Cilene – 3,61 (177 goals in 49 matches)
- Player with most matches:
  - Carla – 153 matches (as of 2024 season)
- Player with most titles won:
  - Formiga – 5 titles
- Manager with most matches:
  - Lucas Piccinato – 131 matches
- Manager with most titles won:
  - José Duarte – 4 titles

== Honours ==
=== Official tournaments ===
National
Competitions	Titles	Seasons
Campeonato Brasileiro Série A1	1	2026
Campeonato Brasileiro (1993–2001)	1	1997
Supercopa do Brasil	1	2025
Campeonato Brasileiro Série A2	1	2019
State
Competitions	Titles	Seasons
Campeonato Paulista	2	1997, 1999

=== Others ===
- Torneio Inicio do Campeonato Paulista (1): 1997

=== Friendly tournaments ===
- Brasil Ladies Cup (1): 2021
- Taça Dourado (1): 1983
- Torneio de Campo Grande (1): 1997
- Torneio da Primavera Rio-São Paulo (1): 1997
- Taça Holambra (1): 1997
- Troféu Aniversário da Cidade de São Paulo (1): 1998
- Torneio Dr. Eduardo José Farah (1): 1999

=== Youth team ===
- Fiesta CONMEBOL Evolución Sub-16 (2): 2018, 2023
- Fiesta CONMEBOL Evolución Sub-14 (1): 2024
- Campeonato Brasileiro Sub-18 (1): 2021
- Campeonato Brasileiro Sub-16 (1): 2019
- Liga de Desenvolvimento Sub-16 (3): 2017, 2018, 2023
- Liga de Desenvolvimento Sub-14 (2): 2024, 2025
- Nike Premier Cup Sub-17 (4): 2019, 2021, 2022, 2023
- Campeonato Paulista Sub-20 (1): 2024
- Campeonato Paulista Sub-17 (6): 2017, 2018, 2019, 2021, 2022, 2023, 2025
- Paulista Cup Sub-17 (1): 2024
- Campeonato Paulista Sub-15 (2): 2024, 2025
- Paulista Cup Sub-15 (1): 2024
- Brasil Ladies Cup Sub-20 (1): 2025

== Seasons ==
=== Brasileiro and Paulista ===
Season	National	M	W	D	L	GF	GA	GD	Win%	Final position	State	M	W	D	L	GF	GA	GD	Win%	Final position
1997	Campeonato Brasileiro (1st level)	8	8	0	0	50	1	+49	100.00	1st	Paulista Feminino	16	13	1	2	76	17	+59	81.25	1st
1998	Campeonato Brasileiro (1st level)	7	6	0	1	69	4	+65	85.71	3rd	Paulista Feminino	10	9	0	1	68	6	+62	90.00	3rd
1999	Campeonato Brasileiro (1st level)	7	6	1	0	42	3	+39	85.71	3rd	Paulista Feminino	12	12	0	0	83	4	+79	100.00	1st
2000	Campeonato Brasileiro (1st level)	7	6	1	0	42	3	+39	85.71	3rd	Did not enter									
2001	Did not enter										Paulista Feminino	11	2	3	6	18	33	−15	18.18	9th
2002	Inactive																			
2003	Inactive																			
2004	Inactive																			
2005	No national competition held										Paulista Feminino	13	9	1	3	40	14	+26	69.23	4th (SF)
2006	Inactive																			
2007	Inactive																			
2008	Inactive																			
2009	Inactive																			
2010	Inactive																			
2011	Inactive																			
2012	Inactive																			
2013	Inactive																			
2014	Inactive																			
2015	Did not qualified in the previous season										Paulista Feminino	18	10	6	2	41	16	+25	55.56	2nd
2016	Inactive																			
2017	Inactive																			
2018	Inactive																			
2019	Série A2 (2nd level)	13	10	2	1	42	4	+38	76.92	1st	Paulista Feminino	20	10	7	3	31	14	+17	50.00	2nd
2020	Série A1 (1st level)	19	10	4	5	37	14	+23	52.63	4th (SF)	Paulista Feminino	7	4	1	2	45	5	+40	57.14	5th (QF)
2021	Série A1 (1st level)	17	9	5	3	34	19	+15	52.94	5th (QF)	Paulista Feminino	15	13	0	2	41	9	+32	86.67	2nd
2022	Série A1 (1st level)	19	12	4	3	33	15	+18	63.16	4th (SF)	Paulista Feminino	13	9	0	4	35	10	+25	69.23	3rd (SF)
2023	Série A1 (1st level)	19	9	5	5	34	18	+16	47.37	4th (SF)	Paulista Feminino	15	10	0	5	34	14	+20	66.67	2nd
2024	Série A1 (1st level)	21	11	4	6	40	25	+15	52.38	2nd	Paulista Feminino	12	7	3	2	29	10	+19	58.33	3rd (SF)
2025	Série A1 (1st level)	19	10	6	3	35	14	+21	52.63	4th (SF)	Paulista Feminino	16	6	3	7	27	21	+6	37.50	4th (SF)
2026	Série A1 (1st level)	23	17	4	2	40	14	+26	73.91	1st	Paulista Feminino	TBD								

=== Copa Libertadores ===
Edition	Round	Opposition	Score
2025	Group stage (Group C)	(Argentina) San Lorenzo	2–0
2025	Group stage (Group C)	(Chile) Colo-Colo	0–1
2025	Group stage (Group C)	(Paraguay) Olimpia	1–0
2025	Quarter-final	(Colombia) Deportivo Cali	0–2

== See also ==
- São Paulo FC
- São Paulo FC (basketball)
- São Paulo FC (futsal)
