= Jucinara =

Brazilian footballer

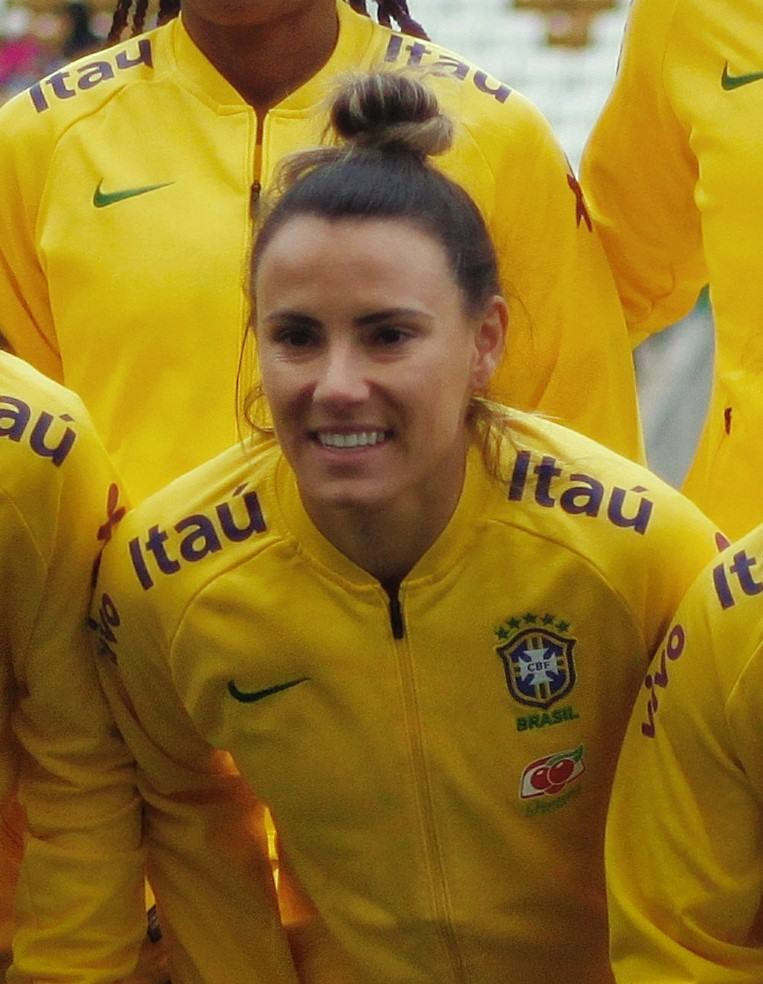
- Jucinara playing for Brazil at the 2019 SheBelieves Cup

Personal information
- Full name: Jucinara Thaís Soares Paz
- Date of birth: 3 August 1993 (age 33)
- Place of birth: Porto Alegre, Brazil
- Height: 1.62 m (5 ft 4 in)
- Position: Left back

Team information
- Current team: Flamengo

Senior career*
| Years | Team | Apps | (Gls) |
| 2011 | Internacional | | |
| 2013–2015 | Centro Olímpico | 31 | (1) |
| 2016 | Corinthians | 6 | (0) |
| 2016 | Osasco Audax | | |
| 2017 | Corinthians | 18 | (3) |
| 2017–2018 | Atlético Madrid | 20 | (1) |
| 2018–2019 | Valencia | 30 | (2) |
| 2019–2022 | Levante | 66 | (1) |
| 2022– | Flamengo | 23 | (0) |

International career^{‡}
| 2010 | Brazil U17 | 4 | (0) |
| 2012 | Brazil U20 | 2 | (0) |
| 2017– | Brazil | 19 | (0) |
- * Club domestic league appearances and goals as of 22:56, 16 April 2024 ‡ National team caps and goals as of 22:56, 16 April 2024

Jucinara Thaís Soares Paz (born 3 August 1993), simply known as Jucinara, is a Brazilian professional footballer who plays as a left back for Brazilian Série A1 club Flamengo.

== Career ==
=== Centro Olímpico ===
Jucinara scored on her league debut, scoring against Duque de Caxias on 18 September 2013 in the 82nd minute.

=== First spell at Corinthians ===
Jucinara made her league debut against Rio Preto on 27 January 2016.

=== Second spell at Corinthians ===
Jucinara made her league debut against São Francisco BA on 12 March 2017. She scored her first goal against Avaí on 20 March 2017, scoring in the 12th minute.

=== Atlético Madrid ===
Jucinara made her league debut against CD Santa Teresa on 23 September 2017. She scored her first goal against Athletic Club on 30 September 2017, scoring in the 20th minute.

=== Valencia ===
Jucinara made her league debut against Logroño on 9 September 2018. She scored her first goal for the club against Rayo Vallecano on 31 March 2019, scoring in the 45th+1st minute.

=== Levante ===
Jucinara made her league debut against Athletic Club on 8 September 2019. She scored her first league goal against Real Sociedad on 18 January 2020, scoring in the 59th minute.

=== Flamengo ===
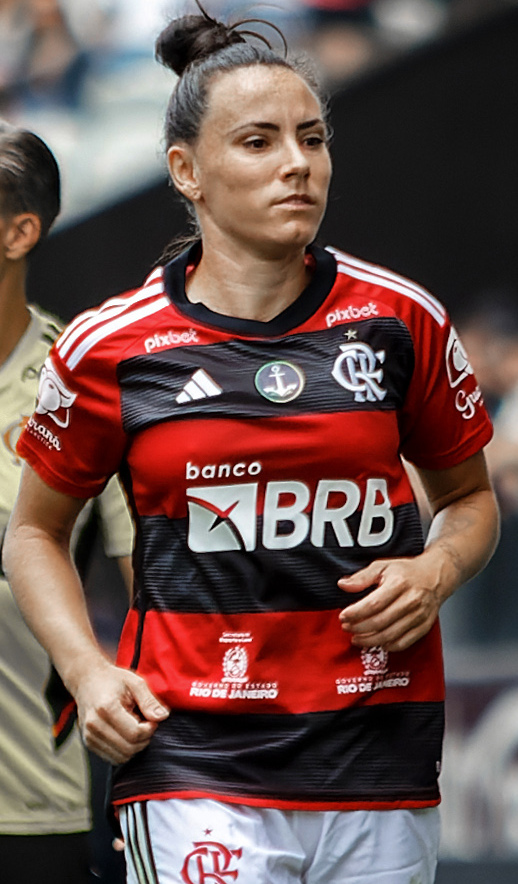
Jucinara with Flamengo in 2023

In June 2022 Jucinara signed for Flamengo after spending five seasons in Spain. She made her league debut against RB Bragantino on 3 August 2022.

== International career ==
Jucinara made her debut for Brazil U17s against Republic of Ireland U17s on 6 September 2010.

Jucinara made her debut for Brazil U20s against Nigeria U17s on 22 August 2012.

Jucinara made her debut for Brazil against Bolivia on 10 April 2017.
