= Campeonato Brasileiro Feminino Sub-20 =

Official Brazilian women national football tournament for U-20 teams

- Founded: 2019
- Country: Brazil
- Current champions: Botafogo (1st tile) (2025)
- Most championships: Internacional (3 titles)
- Broadcaster(s): SporTV

The Campeonato Brasileiro Feminino Sub-20, is the official Brazilian national football tournament for U-20 women's teams. From 2019 to 2021 it was disputed as Sub-18 (under-18) category.

== List of champions ==
Following there are all the championship editions:

=== Sub-18 (under-18) ===
Year	Champion	Runners-up
2019	Internacional; RS	São Paulo; SP
2020	Fluminense; RJ	Internacional; RS
2021	São Paulo; SP	Corinthians; SP

=== Sub-20 (under-20) ===
Year	Champion	Runners-up
2022	Internacional; RS	São Paulo; SP
2023	Internacional; RS	São Paulo; SP
2024	Flamengo; RJ	Botafogo; RJ
2025	Botafogo; RJ	Flamengo; RJ

== Titles by club ==
Titles	Club
3	Internacional
1
1	Botafogo
1	Flamengo
1	Fluminense
1	São Paulo

== See also ==
- Campeonato Brasileiro Feminino
- Campeonato Brasileiro Feminino Sub-17
