= Supercopa do Brasil de Futebol Feminino =

- Organiser(s): CBF
- Founded: 2022; 4 years ago
- Region: Brazil
- Teams: 2
- Current champions: Palmeiras (1st title)
- Most championships: Corinthians (3 titles)
- 2026 Supercopa do Brasil de Futebol Feminino

The Supercopa do Brasil de Futebol Feminino is a Brazilian association football trophy organized by the Brazilian Football Confederation (CBF). The tournament was announced in 2021 and played for the first time in 2022.

== Format ==
Between 2022 and 2025, the competition was contested by 8 teams. The teams were selected from the top twelve teams of the Campeonato Brasileiro de Futebol Feminino Série A1 and the top four teams of the Campeonato Brasileiro de Futebol Feminino Série A2 choosing only one team for state. If necessary, a state would gain a second berth according to its Women's State CBF Ranking position. The teams played a single-elimination tournament, with all stages were played on a single-leg basis.

Following the return of the Copa do Brasil de Futebol Feminino in 2025, the competition's format changed in 2026, with the winners of the Campeonato Brasileiro Feminino A1 and the Copa do Brasil Feminina now facing off in a single match.

== Results ==
Year	Winners	Score	Runners-up	Venue	Attendance
2022; Details	(São Paulo (state)) Corinthians	1–0	(Rio Grande do Sul) Grêmio	Neo Química Arena, São Paulo	19,547
2023; Details	(São Paulo (state)) Corinthians	4–1	(Rio de Janeiro (state)) Flamengo/Marinha	Neo Química Arena, São Paulo	25,779
2024; Details	(São Paulo (state)) Corinthians	1–0	(Minas Gerais) Cruzeiro	Neo Química Arena, São Paulo	33,424
2025; Details	(São Paulo (state)) São Paulo	0–0 (4–3 p)	(São Paulo (state)) Corinthians	MorumBIS, São Paulo	9,031
2026; Details	(São Paulo (state)) Palmeiras	1–1 (5–4 p)	(São Paulo (state)) Corinthians	Arena Crefisa Barueri, Barueri	2,576

=== List of champions ===
Performance in the Supercopa do Brasil
Team	Won	Lost	Years won	Years lost
Corinthians	3	2	2022, 2023, 2024	2025, 2026
São Paulo	1	0	2025	—
Palmeiras	1	0	2026	—
Grêmio	0	1	—	2022
Flamengo/Marinha	0	1	—	2023
Cruzeiro	0	1	—	2024
