= CR Flamengo (women) =

Brazilian football club

Flamengo
- Full name: Clube de Regatas do Flamengo
- Nicknames: Rubro-Negro (Scarlet-Black); Mengão (Big Mengo); Urubu (Vulture)
- Founded: 1995; 31 years ago 2015; 11 years ago (re-founded)
- Ground: Estádio Luso Brasileiro, Rio de Janeiro, Brazil
- Capacity: 5,000
- President: Luiz Eduardo Baptista
- Head coach: Celso Silva
- League: Campeonato Brasileiro Série A1; Campeonato Carioca
- 2025 2025: Série A1, 5th of 16; Carioca, 1st of 8 (champions)
- Website: https://www.flamengo.com.br/futebol-feminino
Home colours	Away colours

Clube de Regatas do Flamengo, commonly known as Flamengo, is a professional women's association football club based in Rio de Janeiro, Brazil. Founded in 1995, the team is affiliated with FFERJ and play their home games at Estádio da Gávea. The team colors, reflected in their logo and uniform, are red and black. They play in the top tier of women's football in Brazil, the Campeonato Brasileiro de Futebol Feminino, and in the Campeonato Carioca de Futebol Feminino, the first division of the traditional in-state competition. Flamengo's women's team had a partnership with the Brazilian Navy from 2015 to 2025.

== Players ==
=== Current squad ===
As of 12 April 2026.

Note: Flags indicate national team as defined under FIFA eligibility rules; some limited exceptions apply. Players may hold more than one non-FIFA nationality.

No.	Pos.	Nation	Player
1	GK	BRA	Vivi Holzel
2	DF	BRA	Monalisa
3	DF	BRA	Núbia
5	MF	BRA	Thaisa
6	DF	BRA	Chai
7	DF	BRA	Fabi Simões
8	MF	BRA	Djeni
10	MF	BRA	Mariana
11	FW	BRA	Cristiane
13	DF	BRA	Bruna
15	MF	BRA	Ana Donato
16	DF	BRA	Flávia Mota
17	DF	BRA	Maisa
19	DF	BRA	Layza Cavalcanti
20	MF	BRA	Kaylane

No.	Pos.	Nation	Player
22	FW	BRA	Fernanda
23	GK	BRA	Karol Alves
25	GK	BRA	Bibi
27	MF	BRA	Emilly
28	MF	BRA	Ju Ferreira
29	FW	BRA	Brendha
31	MF	BRA	Laysa
34	DF	BRA	Ana Laura
35	MF	BRA	Anna Luiza
44	DF	BRA	Sofia
55	MF	BRA	Duda Cerqueira
81	DF	BRA	Jucinara
88	MF	BRA	Letícia
99	MF	BRA	Nina Garrit

=== Youth team ===
Note: Flags indicate national team as defined under FIFA eligibility rules; some limited exceptions apply. Players may hold more than one non-FIFA nationality.

No.	Pos.	Nation	Player
38	FW	BRA	Maria Fernanda
49	FW	BRA	Leane Souza

No.	Pos.	Nation	Player
78	DF	BRA	Nicoli

=== Former players ===
For details of current and former players, see Category:CR Flamengo (women) players.

== Honours ==
=== Official tournaments ===
National
Competitions	Titles	Seasons
Campeonato Brasileiro Série A1	1	2016
State
Competitions	Titles	Seasons
Campeonato Carioca	9	2015, 2016, 2017, 2018, 2019, 2021, 2023, 2024, 2025
Copa Rio	2	2023, 2025

- record

=== Others ===
- Taça Guanabara (4): 2020, 2021, 2022, 2023

=== Friendly tournaments ===
- Brasil Ladies Cup (1): 2022
- Torneio da Cidadania (1): 1995
- Torneio de Rio das Ostras (1): 1999

=== Youth team ===
- Campeonato Brasileiro Feminino Sub-20 (2): 2024, 2026
- Copa São Paulo de Futebol Júnior (2): 2023, 2025
- Campeonato Carioca Sub-20 (2): 2024, 2025
- Campeonato Carioca Sub-17 (1): 2023
- Taça Guanabara Sub-20 (1): 2022
- Taça Guanabara Sub-17 (1): 2022

== See also ==
- CR Flamengo
- Flamengo Basketball
- Clube de Regatas do Flamengo (beach soccer)
- CR Flamengo (Superleague Formula team)
- Flamengo Esports
