= 2025 Sport Club Corinthians Paulista (women) season =

Corinthians
2025 season
- President: Augusto Melo (suspended from 26 May; impeached on 9 August); Osmar Stabile (interim from 26 May – 26 August; elected on 26 August)
- Manager: Lucas Piccinato
- Stadium: Parque São Jorge / Neo Química Arena
- Série A1: Winners
- Copa do Brasil: Quarter-finals
- Supercopa do Brasil: Runners-up
- Campeonato Paulista: Runners-up
- Copa Libertadores: Winners
- Top goalscorer: League: Gabi Zanotti; Jhonson; Victória (8 each); All: Gabi Zanotti (18)
- Highest home attendance: 41,130 vs Cruzeiro (14 September 2025)
Home colors	Away colors	Third colors

The 2025 season was the 23rd season in the history of Sport Club Corinthians Paulista (women). In addition to the domestic league, Corinthians participated in this season's editions of the Supercopa do Brasil, Copa Libertadores Femenina and Campeonato Paulista. This season also featured the return of the Copa do Brasil de Futebol Feminino, which was abolished in 2017 (Corinthians was the last champion in 2016). There was a mid-season break due to the 2025 Copa América Femenina in July-August.

Corinthians was coming off another successful 2024 campaign by achieving a back-to-back continental treble after winning the league, Copa Libertadores Femenina, and Supercopa do Brasil.

== Kits ==
Supplier: Nike / Main sponsor: Esportes da Sorte

Kits from the 2025 season
Home	Home alt.^{1}	Home alt.^{2}	Home alt.^{3}	Home alt.^{4}	Away	Away alt.^{1}	Away alt.^{2}	Third	Goalkeeper^{1}	Goalkeeper^{2}	Goalkeeper^{3}

Kits from the 2024 season
Home	Home alt.^{1}	Home alt.^{2}	Away	Third	Goalkeeper^{1}	Goalkeeper^{2}	Goalkeeper^{3}

=== Kit usage ===
As of 14 December 2025

Kit	Combination	Usage
Kits from the 2025 season
Home	White shirt with black sleeves, black shorts and white socks.	Campeonato Brasileiro: used at home against Grêmio, Bahia (twice), Flamengo, Cruzeiro (twice) and São Paulo; used away against Ferroviária.; Copa do Brasil: used at home against Juventude; used away against Cruzeiro.; Campeonato Paulista: used at home against Red Bull Bragantino, Palmeiras (twice), Ferroviária and Realidade Jovem; used away against Realidade Jovem, Taubaté, Ferroviária and Palmeiras.
Home alt.^{1}	White shirt with black sleeves, black shorts (away kit) and white socks.	Copa Libertadores: used against Dragonas IDV, Always Ready, Boca Juniors, Ferroviária and Deportivo Cali.
Home alt.^{2}	White shirt with black sleeves, white shorts and black socks.	Campeonato Brasileiro: used away against América Mineiro.
Home alt.^{3}	White shirt with black sleeves, black shorts and black socks.	Campeonato Brasileiro: used away against Internacional and Cruzeiro.
Home alt.^{4}	White shirt with black sleeves, black shorts (away kit) and black socks.	Copa Libertadores: used against Santa Fe.
Away	Black shirt with white sleeves, black shorts and black socks.	Campeonato Brasileiro: used at home against Sport Recife.; Copa do Brasil: used away against São Paulo.; Campeonato Paulista: used at home against Taubaté, and Santos; used away against São Paulo, Red Bull Bragantino and Palmeiras.
Away alt.^{1}	Black shirt with white sleeves, black shorts (home kit) and black socks.	Campeonato Brasileiro: used away against São Paulo.
Away alt.^{2}	Black shirt with white sleeves, white shorts and black socks.	Campeonato Brasileiro: used away against Bahia.; Friendly: used away against Chicago Stars and Kansas City Current.
Third	Black shirt, black shorts and black socks; all details in orange	Campeonato Paulista: used at home against São Paulo (twice); used away against São Paulo.
Goalkeeper^{1}	Yellow shirt, yellow shorts and yellow socks.	Campeonato Brasileiro: used at home against Grêmio, Bahia (twice), Sport Recife, Flamengo, São Paulo and Cruzeiro; used away against Ferroviária, América Mineiro, Internacional, Bahia and São Paulo.; Copa do Brasil: used at home against Juventude; used away against São Paulo.; Campeonato Paulista: used at home against Red Bull Bragantino, Taubaté, Palmeiras (twice), Ferroviária, Santos, Realidade Jovem and São Paulo; used away against Santos, São Paulo (twice), Realidade Jovem, Taubaté, Palmeiras (twice) and Ferroviária.; Copa Libertadores: used against Dragonas IDV, Always Ready and Ferroviária.; Friendly: used away against Chicago Stars and Kansas City Current.
Goalkeeper^{2}	Black shirt, black shorts and black socks.	
Goalkeeper^{3}	Orange shirt, orange shorts and orange socks.	Campeonato Paulista: used at home against São Paulo.
Kits from the 2024 season
Home	White shirt with fading black sleeves and bottom, black shorts and white socks.	Campeonato Brasileiro: used at home against Juventude, Palmeiras and 3B da Amazônia.; Supercopa do Brasil: used at home against Cruzeiro.
Home alt.^{1}	White shirt with fading black sleeves and bottom, white shorts and black socks.	Supercopa do Brasil: used away against Grêmio.
Home alt.^{2}	White shirt with fading black sleeves and bottom, black shorts and black socks.	Campeonato Brasileiro: used away against Fluminense.
Away	Black shirt, black shorts and black socks.	Campeonato Brasileiro: used away against Real Brasília, Red Bull Bragantino and São Paulo.; Supercopa do Brasil: used away against São Paulo.; Campeonato Paulista: used away against Santos.
Third	Black and white shirt, black and white shorts and black and white socks.	
Goalkeeper^{1}	Yellow shirt, yellow shorts and yellow socks.	Campeonato Brasileiro: used at home against Juventude, Palmeiras and 3B da Amazônia; used away against Real Brasília, Red Bull Bragantino, Fluminense and São Paulo.; Supercopa do Brasil: used at home against Cruzeiro; used away against Grêmio and São Paulo.
Goalkeeper^{2}	Blue shirt, blue shorts and blue socks.	Campeonato Paulista: used away against Red Bull Bragantino.
Goalkeeper^{3}	Orange shirt, orange shorts and orange socks.	Campeonato Brasileiro: used at home against Cruzeiro; used away against Cruzeiro.; Copa do Brasil: used away against Cruzeiro.; Copa Libertadores: used against Santa Fe, Boca Juniors and Deportivo Cali.

== Squad ==
As of 22 September 2025

Note: Flags indicate national team as defined under FIFA eligibility rules; some limited exceptions apply. Players may hold more than one non-FIFA nationality.

No.	Pos.	Nation	Player
1	GK	BRA	Nicole
2	DF	BRA	Letícia Santos
3	DF	BRA	Leticia Teles
4	DF	BRA	Thaís Regina
5	DF	BRA	Thaís Ferreira
7	MF	COL	Gisela Robledo
8	MF	BRA	Vitória Yaya
9	FW	BRA	Andressa Alves
10	MF	BRA	Gabi Zanotti
11	FW	BRA	Eudimilla
12	GK	BRA	Letícia
13	FW	BRA	Ivana Fuso
15	MF	BRA	Juliana Passari
17	FW	BRA	Victória
18	MF	BRA	Manu Olivan
19	MF	BRA	Letícia Monteiro

No.	Pos.	Nation	Player
20	DF	BRA	Mariza
21	DF	BRA	Paulinha
22	DF	BRA	Juliete
23	DF	BRA	Gi Fernandes
24	GK	BRA	Kemelli
27	MF	BRA	Duda Sampaio
30	FW	BRA	Jaqueline
31	MF	VEN	Dayana Rodríguez
32	GK	BRA	Rillary
33	DF	BRA	Duda Mineira
37	DF	BRA	Tamires (captain)
40	FW	BRA	Jhonson
47	FW	BRA	Ellen
77	FW	BRA	Carol Nogueira
94	FW	BRA	Ariel Godoi
99	DF	BRA	Érika

== Transfers ==
=== Transfers in ===
#	Position:	Player	Transferred from	Fee	Date	Team	Source
40	FW	(Brazil) Jhonson	(Brazil) Toledo	Undisclosed (Note: Jhonson was already on loan with an option to buy since January 2023 until December 2024.)	11 December 2024	First team	
9	FW	(Brazil) Andressa Alves	(United States) Houston Dash	Free transfer (End of contract)	13 December 2024	First team	
3	DF	(Brazil) Leticia Teles	(Brazil) Red Bull Bragantino	Free transfer (End of contract)	6 January 2025	First team	
15	MF	(Brazil) Juliana Passari	(Brazil) Palmeiras	Free transfer (End of contract)	6 January 2025	First team	
22	DF	(Brazil) Juliete	(Brazil) Palmeiras	Free transfer (End of contract)	6 January 2025	First team	
31	MF	(Venezuela) Dayana Rodríguez	(Brazil) Grêmio	Free transfer (End of contract)	7 January 2025	First team	
94	FW	(Brazil) Ariel Godoi	(Brazil) São Paulo	Free transfer (End of contract)	7 January 2025	First team	
4	DF	(Brazil) Thaís Regina	(Brazil) Flamengo	Free transfer (End of contract)	7 January 2025	First team	
19	MF	(Brazil) Letícia Monteiro	(Brazil) Internacional	Undisclosed	7 January 2025	First team	
5	DF	(Brazil) Thaís Ferreira	(Spain) UD Tenerife	Undisclosed	22 February 2025	First team	
13	FW	(Brazil) Ivana Fuso	(England) Birmingham City	Free transfer (End of contract)	8 July 2025	First team	

=== Loans in ===
#	Position:	Player	Loaned from	Date	Loan expires	Team	Source

=== Transfers out ===
#	Position	Player	Transferred to	Fee	Date	Team	Source
14	FW	(Brazil) Millene	(Brazil) Ferroviária	Free transfer (End of contract)	10 December 2024	First team	
71	DF	(Brazil) Yasmim	(Spain) Real Madrid	Free transfer (End of contract)	26 December 2024	First team	
18	FW	(Brazil) Gabi Portilho	(United States) NJ/NY Gotham FC	Free transfer (End of contract)	28 December 2024	First team	
9	FW	(Brazil) Jheniffer	(Mexico) UANL	Free transfer (End of contract)	28 December 2024	First team	
13	DF	(Brazil) Carol Tavares	(Brazil) Red Bull Bragantino	Free transfer (End of contract)	29 December 2024	First team	
22	FW	(Brazil) Fernanda	(Brazil) Flamengo	Free transfer (End of contract)	29 December 2024	First team	
6	DF	(Brazil) Isabela	(Brazil) Cruzeiro	Free transfer (End of contract)	29 December 2024	First team	
28	MF	(Brazil) Ju Ferreira	(Brazil) Flamengo	Free transfer (End of contract)	29 December 2024	First team	
80	GK	(Brazil) Mary Camilo	(Ecuador) Dragonas IDV	Free transfer (End of contract)	29 December 2024	First team	
16	DF	(Colombia) Daniela Arias	(United States) San Diego Wave	US$150,000 (~R$855,000)	25 March 2025	First team	
8	MF	(Brazil) Vitória Yaya	(France) Paris Saint-Germain	Undisclosed (€150,000 ~R$930,000)	22 September 2025	First team	

=== Loans out ===
#	Position:	Player	Loaned to	Date	Loan expires	Team	Source
26	MF	(Brazil) Nicole Marussi	(Brazil) Santos	23 January 2025	31 December 2025	First team	

== Statistics ==
=== Squad statistics ===
No.	Pos.	Name	Campeonato Brasileiro		Copa do Brasil		Supercopa do Brasil		Campeonato Paulista		Copa Libertadores		Total		Discipline	
No.	Pos.	Name	Apps	Goals	Apps	Goals	Apps	Goals	Apps	Goals	Apps	Goals	Apps	Goals	Yellow card	Red card
1	GK	(Brazil) Nicole	21	0	1	0	0	0	0	0	5	0	27	0	1	0
2	DF	(Brazil) Letícia Santos	1 (1)	0	0 (1)	0	1	0	0 (5)	0	0	0	2 (7)	0	2	0
3	DF	(Brazil) Leticia Teles	3 (3)	0	1	0	2	0	10 (1)	0	1	0	17 (4)	0	7	0
4	DF	(Brazil) Thaís Regina	9 (1)	0	2	0	2	0	11 (1)	2	2 (2)	2	26 (4)	4	6	1
5	DF	(Brazil) Thaís Ferreira	16 (1)	1	2	0	2 (1)	0	8 (2)	0	5	0	33 (4)	1	6	0
7	MF	(Colombia) Gisela Robledo	2 (6)	1	1 (1)	1	2 (1)	0	5 (11)	1	5 (1)	0	15 (20)	3	4	0
9	FW	(Brazil) Andressa Alves	13 (4)	4	0 (2)	0	2 (1)	2	9 (2)	1	4 (1)	0	28 (10)	7	9	0
10	MF	(Brazil) Gabi Zanotti	11 (6)	8	2	0	2 (1)	0	7 (5)	4	5 (1)	6	27 (13)	18	3	0
11	FW	(Brazil) Eudimilla	4 (9)	2	0 (1)	0	0 (1)	0	8 (3)	2	0	0	12 (14)	4	1	0
12	GK	(Brazil) Letícia	0	0	2	0	3	0	8	0	1	0	14	0	1	0
13	FW	(Brazil) Ivana Fuso	0	0	0 (2)	0	0	0	5 (6)	3	1 (3)	0	6 (11)	3	0	0
15	MF	(Brazil) Juliana Passari	0	0	0	0	0	0	4 (6)	1	0	0	4 (6)	1	0	0
17	MF	(Brazil) Victória	14 (6)	8	3	3	2 (1)	2	10 (3)	1	3 (2)	0	32 (12)	14	4	0
18	MF	(Brazil) Manu Olivan	0	0	0	0	0	0	1 (2)	0	0	0	1 (2)	0	0	0
19	MF	(Brazil) Letícia Monteiro	7 (7)	6	1 (2)	0	0 (4)	0	8 (7)	2	5 (1)	2	21 (21)	10	1	0
20	DF	(Brazil) Mariza	18	1	2 (1)	0	3	0	7 (3)	0	5	1	35 (4)	2	5	0
21	DF	(Brazil) Paulinha	2 (3)	0	0 (1)	0	2	0	7 (3)	0	0	0	11 (7)	0	1	0
22	DF	(Brazil) Juliete	5 (4)	1	1	0	1 (1)	0	10 (5)	1	1 (5)	0	18 (15)	2	4	0
23	DF	(Brazil) Gi Fernandes	13 (5)	2	2 (1)	0	0	0	8 (3)	0	2 (1)	1	25 (10)	3	5	0
24	GK	(Brazil) Kemelli	0	0	0	0	0	0	10	0	0	0	10	0	0	1
25	FW	(Brazil) Júlia Brito	0	0	0	0	0	0	0	0	0	0	0	0	0	01
25	GK	(Brazil) Yasmin	0	0	0	0	0	0	0	0	0	0	0	0	0	0
27	MF	(Brazil) Duda Sampaio	14 (4)	2	2	0	2 (1)	0	6 (3)	2	4 (2)	1	28 (10)	5	3	0
28	MF	(Brazil) Dafhiny	0	0	0	0	0	0	0 (1)	0	0	0	0 (1)	0	0	0
29	FW	(Brazil) Leticia Rodrigues	0	0	0	0	0	0	0 (1)	0	0	0	0 (1)	0	0	0
30	FW	(Brazil) Jaqueline	19 (1)	6	1	0	0	0	6 (3)	3	0 (2)	0	26 (6)	9	6	0
31	MF	(Venezuela) Dayana Rodríguez	12 (5)	1	2 (1)	0	1	0	8 (5)	1	6	1	29 (11)	3	7	0
32	GK	(Brazil) Rillary	0	0	0	0	0	0	0 (1)	0	0	0	0 (1)	0	0	0
33	DF	(Brazil) Duda Mineira	0	0	0	0	0	0	1 (2)	0	0	0	1 (2)	0	0	0
34	DF	(Brazil) Maia	0	0	0	0	0	0	0 (1)	0	0	0	0 (1)	0	0	0
36	MF	(Brazil) Rafa Rocha	0	0	0	0	0	0	0 (2)	0	0	0	0 (2)	0	0	0
37	DF	(Brazil) Tamires	17	3	2	0	2 (1)	0	7 (3)	1	5	0	33 (4)	4	4	0
40	FW	(Brazil) Jhonson	13 (7)	8	2	0	0 (1)	0	9 (2)	4	1 (5)	2	25 (15)	14	11	0
47	FW	(Brazil) Ellen	0	0	0	0	0	0	0 (4)	1	0	0	0 (4)	1	0	0
77	FW	(Brazil) Carol Nogueira	1 (6)	0	0	0	0 (2)	0	2 (4)	1	0	0	3 (12)	1	0	0
94	FW	(Brazil) Ariel Godoi	2 (13)	2	1 (2)	1	2	0	10 (7)	5	1 (1)	2	16 (23)	10	3	0
99	DF	(Brazil) Érika	6 (4)	1	2	0	0	0	10 (4)	0	4	0	22 (8)	1	4	1
Players transferred out during the season
8	MF	(Brazil) Vitória Yaya	8 (7)	0	1 (1)	0	2	0	3	1	0	0	14 (8)	1	5	0
16	DF	(Colombia) Daniela Arias	0	0	0	0	0	0	0	0	0	0	0	0	0	0

=== Goals ===
As of 14 December 2025

Rank	Player	BR	CdB	ScB	CP	CL	Total
1	(Brazil) Gabi Zanotti	8	0	0	4	6	18
2	(Brazil) Jhonson	8	0	0	4	2	14
2	(Brazil) Victória	8	3	2	1	0	14
4	(Brazil) Ariel Godoi	2	1	1	4	2	10
4	(Brazil) Letícia Monteiro	6	0	0	2	2	10
6	(Brazil) Jaqueline	6	0	0	3	0	9
7	(Brazil) Andressa Alves	4	0	2	1	0	7
8	(Brazil) Duda Sampaio	2	0	0	2	1	5
9	(Brazil) Eudimilla	2	0	0	2	0	4
9	(Brazil) Tamires	3	0	0	1	0	4
9	(Brazil) Thaís Regina	0	0	0	2	2	4
12	(Brazil) Gi Fernandes	2	0	0	0	1	3
12	(Brazil) Ivana Fuso	0	0	0	3	0	3
12	(Colombia) Gisela Robledo	1	1	0	1	0	3
12	(Venezuela) Dayana Rodríguez	1	0	0	1	1	3
16	(Brazil) Juliete	1	0	0	1	0	2
16	(Brazil) Mariza	1	0	0	0	1	2
18	(Brazil) Carol Nogueira	0	0	0	1	0	1
18	(Brazil) Ellen	0	0	0	1	0	1
18	(Brazil) Érika	1	0	0	0	0	1
18	(Brazil) Juliana Passari	0	0	0	1	0	1
18	(Brazil) Thaís Ferreira	1	0	0	0	0	1
18	(Brazil) Vitória Yaya	0	0	0	1	0	1
Own goals		0	0	0	1	0	1
Total		61	5	4	38	18	122

=== Assists ===
As of 14 December 2025

Rank	Player	BR	CdB	ScB	CP	CL	Total
1	(Brazil) Andressa Alves	1	0	0	4	4	9
1	(Brazil) Victória	5	0	1	2	1	9
3	(Brazil) Gi Fernandes	6	0	0	0	2	8
4	(Brazil) Duda Sampaio	5	0	0	1	1	7
5	(Brazil) Jaqueline	6	0	0	0	0	6
5	(Brazil) Letícia Monteiro	2	0	0	3	1	6
7	(Brazil) Eudimilla	3	0	0	2	0	
7	(Colombia) Gisela Robledo	1	1	0	3	0	
7	(Brazil) Tamires	3	0	2	0	0	
10	(Brazil) Ivana Fuso	0	0	0	3	1	4
11	(Brazil) Juliete	2	0	0	0	1	3
11	(Venezuela) Dayana Rodríguez	1	0	0	0	2	3
13	(Brazil) Ariel Godoi	0	0	0	1	1	2
13	(Brazil) Gabi Zanotti	1	0	0	1	0	2
13	(Brazil) Jhonson	1	1	0	0	0	2
13	(Brazil) Mariza	0	0	0	2	0	2
13	(Brazil) Vitória Yaya	1	1	0	0	0	2
18	(Brazil) Carol Nogueira	0	0	0	1	0	1
18	(Brazil) Letícia Santos	0	0	0	1	0	1
18	(Brazil) Leticia Teles	0	0	0	0	1	1
18	(Brazil) Paulinha	1	0	0	0	0	1
18	(Brazil) Thaís Ferreira	1	0	0	0	0	1
18	(Brazil) Thaís Regina	0	1	0	0	0	1
Total		40	4	3	24	15	86

=== Disciplinary record ===
N	P	Nat.	Name	BR			CdB			ScB			CP			CL			Total			Notes
N	P	Nat.	Name	Yellow card	Second yellow card	Red card	Yellow card	Second yellow card	Red card	Yellow card	Second yellow card	Red card	Yellow card	Second yellow card	Red card	Yellow card	Second yellow card	Red card	Yellow card	Second yellow card	Red card	Notes
99	DF	(Brazil)	Érika	1									3		1				4		1	
24	GK	(Brazil)	Kemelli			1															1	
4	DF	(Brazil)	Thaís Regina	2									3	1					5	1		
40	FW	(Brazil)	Jhonson	7			1						1			2			11			
9	FW	(Brazil)	Andressa Alves	4									4			1			9			
3	DF	(Brazil)	Leticia Teles	1			1			1			4						7			
31	MF	(Venezuela)	Dayana Rodríguez	2			1						2			2			7			
30	FW	(Brazil)	Jaqueline	3									2			1			6			
5	DF	(Brazil)	Thaís Ferreira	1			1						4						6			
23	DF	(Brazil)	Gi Fernandes	4									1						5			
20	DF	(Brazil)	Mariza	1			1						2			1			5			
22	DF	(Brazil)	Juliete	1									3						4			
7	FW	(Colombia)	Gisela Robledo	1									2			1			4			
37	DF	(Brazil)	Tamires	4															4			
17	MF	(Brazil)	Victória	1									3						4			
8	MF	(Brazil)	Vitória Yaya	4															4			
94	FW	(Brazil)	Ariel Godoi										2			1			3			
27	MF	(Brazil)	Duda Sampaio	2									1						3			
10	MF	(Brazil)	Gabi Zanotti	2			1												3			
2	DF	(Brazil)	Letícia Santos	1						1									2			
11	FW	(Brazil)	Eudimilla										1						1			
12	GK	(Brazil)	Letícia							1									1			
19	MF	(Brazil)	Letícia Monteiro				1												1			
1	GK	(Brazil)	Nicole	1															1			

Only competitive matches
Ordered by (red card) , (second yellow card) and (yellow card)
(yellow card) = Number of bookings; (second yellow card) = Number of sending offs after a second yellow card; (red card) = Number of sending offs by a direct red card.

== Overview ==
Competition	First match	Last match	Starting round	Final position	Record							
Competition	First match	Last match	Starting round	Final position	Pld	W	D	L	GF	GA	GD	Win %
Série A1	24 March 2025	14 September 2025	Matchday 1	Winners	21	14	6	1	57	17	+40	66.67
Copa do Brasil	6 August 2025	24 September 2025	Third round	Quarter-finals	3	1	1	1	5	4	+1	33.33
Supercopa do Brasil	9 March 2025	15 March 2025	Quarter-finals	Runners-up	3	2	1	0	4	0	+4	66.67
Campeonato Paulista	7 May 2025	14 December 2025	Matchday 1	Runners-up	18	14	2	2	38	13	+25	77.78
Copa Libertadores	2 October 2025	18 October 2025	Group stage	Winners	6	3	3	0	18	2	+16	50.00
Total					51	34	13	4	122	36	+86	66.67

Last updated: 15 December 2025
Source: Competitions

== Friendlies ==
12 July 2025 Teal Rising Cup Semifinal	Chicago Stars (United States)	0–1	(Brazil) Corinthians	Kansas City, United States
16:30 UTC−5		Report	Leticia Teles 90+2'	Stadium: CPKC Stadium; Attendance: Undisclosed; Referee: Rachel Swett

15 July 2025 Teal Rising Cup Final	Kansas City Current (United States)	2–1	(Brazil) Corinthians	Kansas City, United States
20:10 UTC−5	Cooper 3'; Long 22'	Report	Gabi Zanotti 25'	Stadium: CPKC Stadium; Attendance: Undisclosed; Referee: Iryna Petrunok

== Campeonato Brasileiro ==
=== League table ===
Pos	Team	Pld	W	D	L	GF	GA	GD	Pts	Qualification or relegation
1	Cruzeiro	15	11	3	1	35	15	+20	36	Advance to Quarter-finals
2	Corinthians	15	10	4	1	46	12	+34	34	Advance to Quarter-finals
3	São Paulo	15	10	3	2	31	10	+21	33	Advance to Quarter-finals
4	Palmeiras	15	9	3	3	38	20	+18	30	Advance to Quarter-finals
5	Flamengo	15	8	3	4	31	19	+12	27	Advance to Quarter-finals

Source: CBF

=== Results ===
24 March 2025 1	Real Brasília	2–8	Corinthians	Gama
20:15 UTC−3	Katy 65'; Manu Balbinot 66'	Report	Jaqueline 17'; Andressa Alves 38'; Victória 45+2' (pen.); Juliete 55'; Letícia Monteiro 61', 78'; Jhonson 90+3'; Robledo 90+5'	Stadium: Bezerrão (Note: Real Brasília played their home match at Bezerrão, Gama instead of their regular stadium Estádio Ciro Machado do Espírito Santo, Brasília.); Attendance: Undisclosed; Referee: Michelle Peixoto Safatle
Note: The match was originally scheduled for 19:00 local time, but it was delayed to 20:15 due to the pitch conditions after heavy rain.

27 March 2025 2	Corinthians	2–0	Juventude	São Paulo
16:00 UTC−3	Victória 50', 57'	Report		Stadium: Parque São Jorge; Attendance: Undisclosed; Referee: Gleika Oliveira Pinheiro

30 March 2025 3	Red Bull Bragantino	2–2	Corinthians	Santana de Parnaíba
17:00 UTC−3	Gramaglia 15'; Ana Carla 24'	Report	Tamires 80'; Gabi Zanotti 90+7' (pen.)	Stadium: Estádio Gabriel Marques da Silva; Attendance: Undisclosed; Referee: Jaqueline Blasius

12 April 2025 4	Corinthians	1–2	Palmeiras	São Paulo
11:00 UTC−3	Andressa Alves 49'	Report	Lais Estevam 73'; Andressinha 90+5'	Stadium: Parque São Jorge; Attendance: 1,657; Referee: Deborah Cecilia Cruz Correia

15 April 2025 5	Fluminense	1–1	Corinthians	Rio de Janeiro
19:00 UTC−3	Lelê 29'	Report	Letícia Monteiro 45+5'	Stadium: Estádio Moça Bonita; Attendance: Undisclosed; Referee: Charly Deretti

19 April 2025 6	Corinthians	8–0	3B da Amazônia	São Paulo
21:00 UTC−3	Victória 9', 55'; Jaqueline 31', 38'; Letícia Monteiro 42'; Ariel Godoi 50'; Eudimilla 59' (pen.); Jhonson 78'	Report		Stadium: Parque São Jorge; Attendance: 531; Referee: Thayslane de Melo Costa

26 April 2025 7	São Paulo	1–1	Corinthians	Cotia
15:00 UTC−3	Dudinha 45+2'	Report	Jhonson 88'	Stadium: Estádio Marcelo Portugal Gouvêa; Attendance: Undisclosed; Referee: Marianna Nanni Batalha

1 May 2025 8	Corinthians	2–0	Grêmio	São Paulo
19:00 UTC−3	Jaqueline 78'; Gabi Zanotti 90+7'	Report		Stadium: Parque São Jorge; Attendance: 1,165; Referee: Rejane Caetano da Silva

4 May 2025 9	Corinthians	5–1	Bahia	São Paulo
18:30 UTC−3	Jhonson 7', 20'; Gabi Zanotti 37', 76'; Ariel Godoi 53'	Report	Ellen Santana 86'	Stadium: Parque São Jorge; Attendance: 648; Referee: Cássia França de Souza

11 May 2025 10	Ferroviária	1–1	Corinthians	Araraquara
20:00 UTC−3	Mariana Santos 70'	Report	Victória 90+3' (pen.)	Stadium: Fonte Luminosa; Attendance: Undisclosed; Referee: Adeli Mara Monteiro

17 May 2025 11	Corinthians	4–0	Sport Recife	Osasco
21:00 UTC−3	Jhonson 16', 20', 26'; Gabi Zanotti 84'	Report		Stadium: Estádio Municipal José Liberatti (Note: Corinthians played these home matches at Estádio Municipal José Liberatti, Osasco instead of their regular stadium Parque São Jorge, São Paulo, which was prohitibed by the Federação Paulista de Futebol (FPF) of hosting games at night due to issues with the stadium's lighting.); Attendance: Undisclosed; Referee: Francielly Fernanda Lima de Castro

21 May 2025 12	América Mineiro	0–1	Corinthians	Sete Lagoas
16:30 UTC−3		Report	Andressa Alves 84'	Stadium: Arena do Jacaré (Note: América Mineiro was expected to play their home match at Arena Frimisa, Santa Luzia instead of their regular stadium Arena Independência, Belo Horizonte. However, they later opted to play the match at Arena do Jacaré, Sete Lagoas.); Attendance: Undisclosed; Referee: Andressa Hartmann

9 June 2025 13	Corinthians	1–0	Flamengo	São Paulo
20:00 UTC−3	Victória 48'	Report		Stadium: Estádio do Canindé (Note: Corinthians played their home match at Estádio do Canindé, São Paulo instead of their regular stadium Parque São Jorge, São Paulo, which was prohitibed by the Federação Paulista de Futebol (FPF) of hosting games at night due to issues with the stadium's lighting.); Attendance: Undisclosed; Referee: Andreza Helena de Siqueira

15 June 2025 14	Internacional	0–5	Corinthians	Porto Alegre
16:00 UTC−3		Report	Tamires 17'; Jaqueline 41'; Victória 54'; Letícia Monteiro 57'; Eudimilla 72'	Stadium: Estádio Passo D'Areia (Note: Internacional were expected to play their home match at SESC Protásio Alves, Porto Alegre instead of their regular stadium Estádio Beira-Rio, Porto Alegre. However, they later opted to play the match at Estádio Passo D'Areia, Porto Alegre.); Attendance: Undisclosed; Referee: Jenifer Alves de Freitas

18 June 2025 15	Corinthians	4–2	Cruzeiro	São Paulo
15:00 UTC−3	Gabi Zanotti 4' (pen.); Duda Sampaio 68'; Tamires 71'; Letícia Monteiro 78'	Report	Tamires 30' (o.g.); Paloma Maciel 63'	Stadium: Parque São Jorge; Attendance: Undisclosed; Referee: Thayslane de Melo Costa

=== Knockout stages ===
9 August 2025 Quarter-finals	Bahia	1–2	Corinthians	Aracaju
18:00 UTC−3	Rhaizza 84'	Report	Gi Fernandes 34'; Gabi Zanotti 90+6'	Stadium: Batistão (Note: Bahia played their home match at Batistão, Aracaju, Sergipe due to the available stadiums in Bahia for this match not meeting the CBF requirements for the knockout stages.); Attendance: Undisclosed; Referee: Thayslane de Melo Costa

15 August 2025 Quarter-finals	Corinthians	2–0 (4–1 agg.)	Bahia	São Paulo
21:00 UTC−3	Érika 22'; Duda Sampaio 90+1'	Report		Stadium: Mercado Livre Arena Pacaembu (Note: Corinthians played their home match at Mercado Livre Arena Pacaembu, São Paulo instead of their regular stadiums Parque São Jorge or Neo Química Arena, São Paulo, which did not meet CBF requirements and was unavailable, respectively.); Attendance: 1,374; Referee: Deborah Cecilia Cruz Correia

24 August 2025 Semi-finals	São Paulo	0–2	Corinthians	São Paulo
10:30 UTC−3		Report	Jaqueline 4'; Rodríguez 76'	Stadium: Mercado Livre Arena Pacaembu (Note: São Paulo played their home match at Mercado Livre Arena Pacaembu, São Paulo instead of their regular stadiums Estádio Marcelo Portugal Gouvêa, Cotia or MorumBIS, São Paulo, which did not meet CBF requirements and was unavailable, respectively.); Attendance: 3,246; Referee: Daiane Muniz

31 August 2025 Semi-finals	Corinthians	2–2 (4–2 agg.)	São Paulo	São Paulo
10:30 UTC−3	Mariza 26'; Andressa Alves 42'	Report	Aline Milene 36'; Isa Guimarães 63'	Stadium: Estádio do Canindé (Note: Corinthians played their home match at Estádio do Canindé, São Paulo instead of their regular stadiums Parque São Jorge or Neo Química Arena, São Paulo, which did not meet CBF requirements and was unavailable, respectively.); Attendance: 7,808; Referee: Marianna Nanni Batalha

7 September 2025 Finals	Cruzeiro	2–2	Corinthians	Belo Horizonte
10:30 UTC−3	Marília 28'; Isabela 79'	Report	Gi Fernandes 6'; Gabi Zanotti 74'	Stadium: Arena Independência; Attendance: 19,175; Referee: Thayslane de Melo Costa

14 September 2025 Finals	Corinthians	1–0 (3–2 agg.)	Cruzeiro	São Paulo
10:30 UTC−3	Thaís Ferreira 50'			Stadium: Neo Química Arena; Attendance: 41,130; Referee: Deborah Cecilia Cruz Correia

== Copa do Brasil ==
6 August 2025 Third round	Cruzeiro	1–1 (2–4 p)	Corinthians	Nova Lima
16:30 UTC−3	Isabela 45+4'	Report	Victória 29'	Stadium: Estádio Castor Cifuentes; Attendance: Undisclosed; Referee: Cássia França de Souza
	Penalties
	Byanca Brasil (penalty missed); Vitória Calhau (penalty scored); Pri Back (penalty scored); Gisseli (penalty missed)		(penalty scored) Victória; (penalty scored) Andressa Alves; (penalty scored) Thaís Ferreira; (penalty scored) Mariza
Note: The match was originally scheduled for 19:30 local time, but it was anticipated to 16:30 due to a broadcast request.

17 September 2025 Round of 16	Corinthians	3–0	Juventude	São Paulo
15:00 UTC−3	Victória 20'; Ariel Godoi 39'; Robledo 63'	Report		Stadium: Parque São Jorge; Attendance: 277; Referee: Jady Jesus Caldas

24 September 2025 Quarter-finals	São Paulo	3–1	Corinthians	Santana de Parnaíba
18:00 UTC−3	Camilinha 42'; Carol Gil 51'; Isa Guimarães 90'	Report	Victória 45+3'	Stadium: Estádio Gabriel Marques da Silva (Note: São Paulo played their home match at Estádio Gabriel Marques da Silva, Santana de Parnaíba instead of their regular stadiums Estádio Marcelo Portugal Gouvêa, Cotia or MorumBIS, São Paulo.); Attendance: Undisclosed; Referee: Daiane Muniz

== Supercopa do Brasil ==
9 March 2025 Quarter-finals	Grêmio	0–3	Corinthians	Porto Alegre
16:00 UTC−3		Report	Victória 43'; Andressa Alves 45+2', 58'	Stadium: Arena do Grêmio; Attendance: Undisclosed; Referee: Rejane Caetano da Silva

12 March 2025 Semi-finals	Corinthians	1–0	Cruzeiro	São Bernardo do Campo
19:00 UTC−3	Victória 83' (pen.)	Report		Stadium: Estádio 1º de Maio (Note: Corinthians played their home match at Estádio 1º de Maio, São Bernardo do Campo instead of their regular stadiums Parque São Jorge or Neo Química Arena, São Paulo, which did not meet CBF requirements and was unavailable, respectively.); Attendance: Undisclosed; Referee: Charly Deretti

15 March 2025 Finals	São Paulo	0–0 (4–3 p)	Corinthians	São Paulo
16:30 UTC−3		Report		Stadium: MorumBIS; Attendance: 9,031; Referee: Thayslane de Melo Costa
	Penalties
	Karla Alves (penalty scored); Kaká (penalty scored); Aline Milene (penalty missed); Bruna Calderan (penalty scored); Robinha (penalty scored)		(penalty scored) Gabi Zanotti; (penalty missed) Victória; (penalty scored) Andressa Alves; (penalty scored) Mariza; (penalty missed) Robledo

== Campeonato Paulista ==
=== First stage ===
7 May 2025 1	Corinthians	4–0	Red Bull Bragantino	São Paulo
18:00 UTC−3	Jhonson 12'; Yaya 46'; Victória 57'; Ariel Godoi 66'	Report		Stadium: Parque São Jorge; Attendance: Undisclosed; Referee: Ana Caroline D’eleuterio de Sousa Carvalho

14 May 2025 2	Santos	0–3	Corinthians	Santo André
20:00 UTC−3		Report	Ariel Godoi 28', 62'; Eudimilla 64'	Stadium: Estádio Bruno José Daniel (Note: Santos played their home match at Estádio Bruno José Daniel, Santo André instead of their regular stadium Vila Belmiro, Santos.); Attendance: Undisclosed; Referee: Edina Alves Batista

4 June 2025 3	Corinthians	5–1	Taubaté	Osasco
21:00 UTC−3	Jaqueline 30'; Ariel Godoi 41'; Andressa Alves 65'; Gabi Zanotti 77', 80'	Report	Kakau 39'	Stadium: Estádio Municipal José Liberatti; Attendance: Undisclosed; Referee: Marianna Nanni Batalha

22 June 2025 4	São Paulo	2–1	Corinthians	Santana de Parnaíba
19:00 UTC−3	Kaká 90+4'; Vitorinha 90+6'	Report	Duda Sampaio 32'	Stadium: Estádio Gabriel Marques da Silva (Note: São Paulo played their home match at Estádio Gabriel Marques da Silva, Santana de Parnaíba instead of their regular stadiums Estádio Marcelo Portugal Gouvêa, Cotia or MorumBIS, São Paulo.); Attendance: Undisclosed; Referee: Marianna Nanni Batalha

3 August 2025 5	Corinthians	1–0	Palmeiras	São Paulo
11:00 UTC−3	Gabi Zanotti 41'	Report		Stadium: Parque São Jorge; Attendance: 792; Referee: Daiane Muniz

12 August 2025 6	Corinthians	2–0	Ferroviária	São Paulo
18:00 UTC−3	Rodríguez 34'; Carol Nogueira 66'	Report		Stadium: Mercado Livre Arena Pacaembu (Note: Corinthians played their home match at Mercado Livre Arena Pacaembu, São Paulo instead of their regular stadium Parque São Jorge, São Paulo, which was prohitibed by the Federação Paulista de Futebol (FPF) of hosting games at night due to issues with the stadium's lighting.); Attendance: 209; Referee: Jéssica Aparecida Milani

21 August 2025 7	Realidade Jovem	0–3	Corinthians	São José do Rio Preto
15:00 UTC−3		Report	Ivana Fuso 2'; Juliana Passari 26'; Thaís Regina 42'	Stadium: Estádio João Mendes Athayde; Attendance: Undisclosed; Referee: Adeli Mara Monteiro

4 September 2025 8	Red Bull Bragantino	2–3	Corinthians	Bragança Paulista
17:00 UTC−3	Ongaro 29'; Ilana Mendonça 45+3'	Report	Letícia Monteiro 26'; Ellen 78'; Robledo 90'	Stadium: Estádio Cícero de Souza Marques (Note: Red Bull Bragantino were expected to play their home match at their regular stadium Estádio Gabriel Marques da Silva, Santana de Parnaíba. However, they later opted to play the match at their men's regular stadium Estádio Cícero de Souza Marques, Bragança Paulista.); Attendance: Undiclosed; Referee: Ronald Horns Araújo

20 September 2025 9	Corinthians	1–0	Santos	São Paulo
11:00 UTC−3	Jaqueline 45+4'	Report		Stadium: Parque São Jorge; Attendance: 637; Referee: Marianna Nanni Batalha

28 September 2025 10	Taubaté	0–3	Corinthians	Taubaté
15:00 UTC−3		Report	Juliete 38'; Ivana Fuso 42'; Ariel Godoi 70'	Stadium: Estádio Joaquim de Morais Filho; Attendance: Undisclosed; Referee: Pietro Dimitrof Stefanelli

1 November 2025 11	Corinthians	3–1	São Paulo	São Paulo
11:00 UTC−3	Jhonson 9' (pen.); Tamires 72'; Thaís Regina 90+13'	Report	Serrana 17'	Stadium: Parque São Jorge; Attendance: 635; Referee: Rodrigo Fernandes Junior

10 November 2025 12	Palmeiras	0–0	Corinthians	Barueri
20:00 UTC−3		Report		Stadium: Arena Barueri; Attendance: Undisclosed; Referee: Jéssica Aparecida Milani

13 November 2025 13	Ferroviária	0–0	Corinthians	Araraquara
18:00 UTC−3		Report		Stadium: Fonte Luminosa; Attendance: Undisclosed; Referee: Ana Caroline D’eleuterio de Sousa Carvalho

16 November 2025 14	Corinthians	3–0	Realidade Jovem	Osasco
19:30 UTC−3	Letícia Monteiro 27'; Ivana Fuso 53'; Eudimilla 90+1' (pen.)	Report		Stadium: Estádio Municipal José Liberatti; Attendance: Undisclosed; Referee: Fernanda dos Santos Ignacio de Souza

=== Knockout stages ===
22 November 2025 Semi-finals	São Paulo	1–2	Corinthians	Barueri
11:00 UTC−3	Giovanna Crivelari 45'	Report	Jhonson 12', 83'	Stadium: Arena Barueri (Note: São Paulo played their home match at Arena Barueri, Barueri instead of their regular stadiums Estádio Marcelo Portugal Gouvêa, Cotia or MorumBIS, São Paulo.); Attendance: Undisclosed; Referee: Gustavo Holanda Souza

4 December 2025 Semi-finals	Corinthians	2–1 (4–2 agg.)	São Paulo	São Paulo
21:30 UTC−3	Duda Sampaio 56'; Jaqueline 79'	Report	Kaká 6' (pen.)	Stadium: Neo Química Arena; Attendance: 8,203; Referee: Fabiano Monteiro dos Santos

7 December 2025 Finals	Palmeiras	5–1	Corinthians	Barueri
11:00 UTC−3	Brena 11', 45+7'; Amanda Gutierres 26'; Raissa Bahia 59'; Fê Palermo 90+1'	Report	Pati Maldaner 80' (o.g.)	Stadium: Arena Barueri; Attendance: 1,492; Referee: Marianna Nanni Batalha

14 December 2025 Finals	Corinthians	1–0 (2–5 agg.)	Palmeiras	São Paulo
10:00 UTC−3	Gabi Zanotti 52' (pen.)	Report		Stadium: Estádio do Canindé (Note: Corinthians played their home match at Estádio do Canindé, São Paulo instead of their regular stadiums Parque São Jorge or Neo Química Arena, São Paulo, which did not meet the finals requirements and was unavailable, respectively.); Attendance: Undisclosed; Referee: Daiane Muniz

== Copa Libertadores ==
=== Group stage ===
Pos	Team	Pld	W	D	L	GF	GA	GD	Pts	Qualification
1	(Brazil) Corinthians	3	2	1	0	13	1	+12	7	Quarter-finals
2	(Ecuador) Dragonas IDV	3	2	1	0	7	1	+6	7	Quarter-finals
3	(Colombia) Santa Fe	3	1	0	2	7	2	+5	3	
4	(Bolivia) Always Ready	3	0	0	3	0	23	−23	0	

Source: CONMEBOL

2 October 2025 1	Corinthians (Brazil)	1–1	(Ecuador) Dragonas IDV	Banfield, Argentina
16:00 UTC−3	Gabi Zanotti 12' (pen.)	Report	Valencia 90+4'	Stadium: Estadio Florencio Sola; Attendance: Undisclosed; Referee: Laura Fortunato (Argentina)

5 October 2025 2	Corinthians (Brazil)	11–0	(Bolivia) Always Ready	Morón, Argentina
16:00 UTC−3	Ariel Godoi 2', 57'; Thaís Regina 17', 79'; Rodríguez 24'; Letícia Monteiro 37', 55'; Gabi Zanotti 51'; Duda Sampaio 83'; Gi Fernandes 87'; Jhonson 90+7'	Report		Stadium: Estadio Nuevo Francisco Urbano; Attendance: Undisclosed; Referee: Stefani Escobar (Venezuela)

8 October 2025 3	Santa Fe (Colombia)	0–1	(Brazil) Corinthians	Banfield, Argentina
20:00 UTC−3		Report	Gabi Zanotti 12'	Stadium: Estadio Florencio Sola; Attendance: Undisclosed; Referee: Zulma Quiñónez (Paraguay)

=== Knockout stages ===
11 October 2025 Quarter-final	Corinthians (Brazil)	4–0	(Argentina) Boca Juniors	Morón, Argentina
16:00 UTC−3	Gabi Zanotti 7' (pen.), 12', 41'; Jhonson 68'	Report		Stadium: Estadio Nuevo Francisco Urbano; Attendance: Undisclosed; Referee: Emikar Calderas (Venezuela)

15 October 2025 Semi-final	Corinthians (Brazil)	1–1 (6–5 p)	(Brazil) Ferroviária	Banfield, Argentina
20:00 UTC−3	Mariza 41'	Report	Andressa 81'	Stadium: Estadio Florencio Sola; Attendance: Undisclosed; Referee: Nadia Fuques (Uruguay)
	Penalties
	Gabi Zanotti (penalty scored); Victória (penalty scored); Jaqueline (penalty missed); Mariza (penalty scored); Jhonson (penalty scored); Thaís Ferreira (penalty scored); Duda Sampaio (penalty scored)		(penalty scored) Duda Santos; (penalty scored) Katiuscia; (penalty scored) Rafa Soares; (penalty missed) Mylena Carioca; (penalty scored) Micaelly; (penalty scored) Andressa; (penalty missed) Fátima Dutra

18 October 2025 Final	Corinthians (Brazil)	0–0 (5–3 p)	(Colombia) Deportivo Cali	Banfield, Argentina
16:30 UTC−3		Report		Stadium: Estadio Florencio Sola; Attendance: Undisclosed; Referee: Laura Fortunato (Argentina)
	Penalties
	Gabi Zanotti (penalty scored); Victória (penalty scored); Thaís Ferreira (penalty scored); Mariza (penalty scored); Jhonson (penalty scored)		(penalty scored) García; (penalty missed) Ibargüen; (penalty scored) Aponzá; (penalty scored) Perlaza

== See also ==
- List of SC Corinthians Paulista (women) seasons
