= 2026 SC Corinthians Paulista (women) season =

Corinthians 2026 football season

Corinthians
2026 season
- President: Osmar Stabile
- Manager: Lucas Piccinato (until 20 February); Emily Lima (24 February – 3 November); Julia Passero (caretaker, from 10 November)
- Stadium: Parque São Jorge / Neo Química Arena
- Série A1: Runners-up
- Copa do Brasil: Round of 16
- Supercopa do Brasil: Runners-up
- Campeonato Paulista: Play-in
- Copa Libertadores: Runners-up
- FIFA Champions Cup: Runners-up
- Top goalscorer: League: Gabi Zanotti; Jhonson (7 each); All: Gabi Zanotti (16)
- Highest home attendance: 21,871 vs São Paulo (26 September 2026)
- Lowest home attendance: 363 vs São Paulo (11 May 2026)
Home colors	Away colors	Third colors

The 2026 season is the 24th season in the history of Sport Club Corinthians Paulista (women). In addition to the domestic league, Corinthians will participate in this season's editions of the Copa do Brasil, Supercopa do Brasil, Copa Libertadores Femenina and Campeonato Paulista.

This season also featured the inaugural edition of the FIFA Women's Champions Cup, which took place in London, England, at the beginning of the season.

Corinthians is coming off another successful campaign by achieving a back-to-back continental double after winning the league (sixth in a row; seventh overall) and Copa Libertadores Femenina (third in a row; sixth overall).

There was a mid-season break due to the 2026 FIFA World Cup in June–July.

== Background ==
=== Kits ===
Supplier: Nike / Main sponsor: Esportes da Sorte (until 5 October) (Note: After the Provisional Measure 1394/2026 was enacted on 25 September 2026, all sports betting sites (such as Esportes da Sorte) were forbidden in the country effective 6 October. The measure is set to expire 60 days after its enactment unless extended.)

Kits from the 2026 season
Home	Home alt.	Away	Away alt.	Third	Third alt.	Goalkeeper^{1}	Goalkeeper^{2}

Kits from the 2025 season
Home	Home alt.^{1}	Home alt.^{2}	Away	Away alt.	Third	Goalkeeper^{1}	Goalkeeper^{2}	Goalkeeper^{3}

==== Kit usage ====
As of 17 November 2026

Kit	Combination	Usage
Kits from the 2026 season
Home	White shirt, black shorts and white socks.	Campeonato Brasileiro: used at home against Vitória, Santos, Internacional, Cruzeiro and São Paulo; used away against Flamengo.; Copa do Brasil: used away against Palmeiras and Ferroviária; Campeonato Paulista: used at home against Ferroviária; used away against Red Bull Bragantino, Palmeiras and Mirassol.; Copa Libertadores: used against Colo-Colo, Caracas, Santa Fe (twice), Dragonas IDV and Cruzeiro.
Home alt	White shirt, black shorts and black socks.	Campeonato Brasileiro: used away against Cruzeiro (twice).
Away	Black shirt with white stripes, black shorts and black socks.	Campeonato Brasileiro: used at home against Bahia; used away against São Paulo.; Campeonato Paulista: used at home against Taubaté.
Away alt.	Black shirt with white stripes, white shorts and black socks.	Campeonato Brasileiro: used away against Bahia (twice).; Campeonato Paulista: used away against Red Bull Bragantino.
Third	Light blue shirt, black shorts and light blue socks.	
Third alt.	Light blue shirt, light blue shorts and light blue socks.	Campeonato Brasileiro: used at home against Bahia (goalkeepers only).
Goalkeeper^{1}	Purple shirt, purple shorts and purple socks.	Campeonato Brasileiro: used at home against Vitória, Santos, Internacional and Cruzeiro; used away against Cruzeiro, Flamengo, Bahia and São Paulo.; Copa do Brasil: used away against Palmeiras.; Campeonato Paulista: used at home against Ferroviária and Taubaté; used away against Red Bull Bragantino (twice), Palmeiras and Mirassol.; Copa Libertadores: used against Caracas and Santa Fe.
Goalkeeper^{2}	Grey shirt, grey shorts and grey socks.	Campeonato Brasileiro: used at home São Paulo; used away against Cruzeiro and Bahia.; Copa do Brasil: used away against Ferroviária.

Kit	Combination	Usage
Kits from the 2025 season
Home	White shirt with black sleeves, black shorts and white socks.	Campeonato Brasileiro: used at home against Fluminense, América Mineiro and Ferroviária; used away against Palmeiras.; Supercopa do Brasil: used against Palmeiras.; Campeonato Paulista: used at home against São Paulo.; Friendly: used against América.
Home alt.^{1}	White shirt with black sleeves, white shorts and white socks.	Campeonato Brasileiro: used away against Atlético Mineiro and Botafogo.
Home alt.^{2}	White shirt with black sleeves, white shorts and black socks.	Campeonato Brasileiro: used away against Grêmio.
Away	Black shirt with white sleeves, black shorts and black socks.	Campeonato Brasileiro: used at home against Red Bull Bragantino; used away against Juventude.; FIFA Champions Cup: used against Gotham FC.
Away alt.	Black shirt with white sleeves, white shorts and black socks.	Friendly: used against Kansas City Current.
Third	Black shirt, black shorts and black socks; all details in orange	Campeonato Brasileiro: used at home against São Paulo and Mixto.; Campeonato Paulista: used at home against Santos.; FIFA Champions Cup: used against Arsenal.
Goalkeeper^{1}	Yellow shirt, yellow shorts and yellow socks.	Campeonato Brasileiro: used at home against Fluminense, América Mineiro, Red Bull Bragantino, Ferroviária, São Paulo and Mixto; used away against Palmeiras, Botafogo, Juventude and Grêmio.; Supercopa do Brasil: used against Palmeiras.; Campeonato Paulista: used at home against São Paulo and Santos.; FIFA Champions Cup: used against Arsenal.; Friendly: used against Kansas City Current and América.
Goalkeeper^{2}	Black shirt, black shorts and black socks.	
Goalkeeper^{3}	Orange shirt, orange shorts and orange socks.	Campeonato Brasileiro: used away against Atlético Mineiro.; Copa Libertadores: used against Colo-Colo, Dragonas IDV, Santa Fe and Cruzeiro.; FIFA Champions Cup: used against Gotham FC.

== Squad ==
As of 2 September 2026

Note: Flags indicate national team as defined under FIFA eligibility rules; some limited exceptions apply. Players may hold more than one non-FIFA nationality.

No.	Pos.	Nation	Player
1	GK	BRA	Nicole
2	DF	ARG	Agustina Barroso
4	DF	BRA	Thaís Regina
5	DF	BRA	Thaís Ferreira
7	MF	COL	Gisela Robledo
8	FW	BRA	Andressa Alves
9	FW	BRA	Jhonson
10	MF	BRA	Gabi Zanotti (captain)
11	FW	BRA	Ariel Godoi
12	GK	BRA	Letícia
13	FW	BRA	Ivana Fuso
17	FW	BRA	Victória
19	MF	BRA	Letícia Monteiro
20	MF	COL	Paola García
22	DF	BRA	Juliete

No.	Pos.	Nation	Player
23	DF	BRA	Gi Fernandes
25	FW	URU	Belén Aquino
27	MF	BRA	Duda Sampaio
29	FW	BRA	Rhaizza
30	FW	BRA	Jaqueline
31	MF	VEN	Dayana Rodríguez
32	GK	BRA	Rillary
33	DF	BRA	Duda Mineira
36	DF	BRA	Rafa Rocha
37	DF	BRA	Tamires
41	GK	BRA	Ana Morganti
77	FW	BRA	Carol Nogueira
88	MF	BRA	Ana Vitória
99	DF	BRA	Érika

=== Squad number changes ===
Notes:

- Squad numbers last updated on 14 May 2026.
- Player^{*} – Player who joined Corinthians permanently or on loan during the season.
- Player^{†} – Player who departed Corinthians permanently or on loan during the season.

Player	Pos.	Prev. No.	New No.	Previous player to wear number	Notes
(Brazil) Rhaizza^{*}	FW	—	29	Leticia Rodrigues (2025)	Leticia Rodrigues returned to the youth squad (December 2025)
(Colombia) Paola García^{*}	MF	—	20	Mariza (2025)	Mariza departed the club (December 2025)
(Uruguay) Belén Aquino^{*}	FW	—	25	Júlia Brito (2025)	Júlia Brito returned to the youth squad (December 2025)
(Argentina) Agustina Barroso^{*}	DF	—	2	Letícia Santos (2025)	Letícia Santos departed the club (December 2025)
(Brazil) Ana Vitória^{*}	MF	—	88	—	—
(Brazil) Andressa Alves	FW	9	8	Vitória Yaya (2025)	Yaya departed the club (September 2025)
(Brazil) Ariel Godoi	FW	94	11	Eudimilla (2025)	Eudimilla departed the club (December 2025)
(Brazil) Jhonson	FW	40	9	Andressa Alves (2025)	Andressa Alves took the number 8 shirt (January 2026); Jhonson took the new number in May 2026.

== Managerial changes ==
On 20 February, Lucas Piccinato was fired after a 2–2 home draw against Fluminense and recurring poor performances in previous seasons, despite winning major titles during them.

Four days later, former Brazil women's national football team manager Emily Lima was announced as the club's new manager. She became the first woman in charge of the club's department. On 3 November, after losing the Libertadores title, Lima was sacked. Under her spell, Corinthians lost the national title and was eliminated early in the Copa do Brasil as well. The club also lost its first match ever at Neo Química Arena, alongside worse results than the previous management. The club's current U-20 coach Julia Passero was announced as the caretaker manager on 10 November.

Manager	Signed from	Date of signing	Date of departure	Signed with	Source
(Brazil) Lucas Piccinato	(Brazil) Internacional	7 December 2023	20 February 2026	—	
(Portugal) Emily Lima	Free agent	24 February 2026	3 November 2026	—	
(Brazil) Julia Passero	Corinthians U-20 head coach (caretaker)	10 November 2026	—	—	

== Transfers ==
=== Transfers in ===
#	Position:	Player	Transferred from	Fee	Date	Team	Source
29	FW	(Brazil) Rhaizza	(Brazil) Bahia	Free transfer (End of contract)	30 December 2025	First team	
20	MF	(Colombia) Paola García	(Colombia) Deportivo Cali	Undisclosed	31 December 2025	First team	
25	FW	(Uruguay) Belén Aquino	(Brazil) Internacional	Undisclosed	10 January 2026	First team	
2	DF	(Argentina) Agustina Barroso	(Brazil) Flamengo	Free transfer (End of contract)	10 January 2026	First team	
88	MF	(Brazil) Ana Vitória	(Spain) Atlético Madrid	Free transfer (Rescinded contract)	12 January 2026	First team	

=== Loans in ===
#	Position	Player	Loaned from	Date	Loan expires	Team	Source

=== Transfers out ===
#	Position	Player	Transferred to	Fee	Date	Team	Source
20	DF	(Brazil) Mariza	(Mexico) UANL	Free transfer (End of contract)	8 December 2026	First team	
24	GK	(Brazil) Kemelli	(Brazil) Fluminense	Free transfer (End of contract)	16 December 2025	First team	
21	DF	(Brazil) Paulinha	(Brazil) Internacional	Free transfer (End of contract)	27 December 2025	First team	
2	DF	(Brazil) Letícia Santos	(Brazil) Santos	Free transfer (End of contract)	28 December 2025	First team	
11	FW	(Brazil) Eudimilla	(Brazil) Santos	Free transfer (End of contract)	28 December 2025	First team	
18	MF	(Brazil) Manu Olivan	(United States) Miami Dade College Sharks	Free transfer (Rescinded contract)	4 July 2026	First team	
3	DF	(Brazil) Leticia Teles	(Saudi Arabia) Al Qadsiah	US$800,000 (~R$4,100,000)	2 September 2026	First team	

=== Loans out ===
#	Position	Player	Loaned to	Date	Loan expires	Team	Source
	MF	(Brazil) Nicole Marussi	(Brazil) Juventude	18 February 2026	31 December 2026	First team	
47	MF	(Brazil) Ellen	(Brazil) Botafogo	2 March 2026	31 December 2026	First team	
15	MF	(Brazil) Juliana Passari	(Peru) Alianza Lima	14 August 2026	31 December 2026	First team	

== Squad statistics ==
As of 17 November 2026

No.	Pos.	Name	Campeonato Brasileiro		Copa do Brasil		Supercopa do Brasil		Campeonato Paulista		Copa Libertadores		FIFA Champions Cup		Total		Discipline	
No.	Pos.	Name	Apps	Goals	Apps	Goals	Apps	Goals	Apps	Goals	Apps	Goals	Apps	Goals	Apps	Goals	Yellow card	Red card
1	GK	(Brazil) Nicole	16	0	2	0	0 (1)	0	4	0	0	0	0	0	22 (1)	0	1	0
2	DF	(Argentina) Agustina Barroso	0	0	0	0	0	0	0	0	0	0	0	0	0	0	0	0
4	DF	(Brazil) Thaís Regina	10	0	0	0	0	0	1 (1)	0	6	0	0	0	17 (1)	0	3	1
5	DF	(Brazil) Thaís Ferreira	21	3	2	0	1	0	3	0	5	0	2	0	34	3	1	0
7	MF	(Colombia) Gisela Robledo	0 (18)	2	0	0	0 (1)	0	5 (2)	1	0 (5)	2	0 (1)	0	5 (27)	5	1	0
8	FW	(Brazil) Andressa Alves	9 (8)	4	2	0	1	0	1 (2)	0	4	1	2	0	19 (10)	5	3	0
9	FW	(Brazil) Jhonson	13 (7)	7	2	0	0 (1)	0	5 (1)	4	0 (1)	0	0 (2)	0	20 (12)	11	3	0
10	MF	(Brazil) Gabi Zanotti	21 (1)	7	2	1	1	0	3 (2)	1	1 (3)	5	2	2	30 (6)	16	5	0
11	FW	(Brazil) Ariel Godoi	2 (10)	2	0	0	0	0	4 (4)	6	0 (4)	0	0 (1)	0	6 (19)	8	1	0
12	GK	(Brazil) Letícia	6	0	0	0	1	0	2	0	6	0	2	0	17	0	1	0
13	FW	(Brazil) Ivana Fuso	9 (3)	1	2	0	0	0	3 (2)	0	3 (1)	0	0 (2)	0	17 (8)	1	5	0
14	DF	(Brazil) Rafa Rocha	0 (1)	0	0	0	0	0	0 (2)	0	0	0	0	0	0 (3)	0	0	0
17	MF	(Brazil) Victória	15 (6)	6	0 (2)	0	0 (1)	0	7 (1)	0	6	6	0 (2)	1	28 (12)	13	3	0
19	MF	(Brazil) Letícia Monteiro	9 (6)	1	0 (1)	0	0 (1)	0	4 (2)	0	6	1	0	0	19 (10)	2	1	0
20	MF	(Colombia) Paola García	1 (3)	0	0	0	0	0	1 (3)	0	0 (2)	1	0	0	2 (8)	1	2	0
22	DF	(Brazil) Juliete	8 (7)	1	1 (1)	0	0	0	4 (1)	0	0 (2)	0	0	0	13 (11)	1	2	0
23	DF	(Brazil) Gi Fernandes	14 (2)	0	0	0	1	0	5 (3)	0	3 (2)	1	2	0	25 (7)	1	4	0
25	FW	(Uruguay) Belén Aquino	15 (6)	3	0 (2)	0	1	0	2 (6)	0	4 (1)	2	2	0	24 (15)	5	5	0
27	MF	(Brazil) Duda Sampaio	18 (1)	4	2	0	1	0	2 (1)	0	4 (1)	5	2	0	30 (3)	8	1	0
29	FW	(Brazil) Rhaizza	1 (8)	1	0 (1)	0	0	0	3 (4)	0	0	0	0	0	4 (13)	1	2	1
30	FW	(Brazil) Jaqueline	14 (4)	6	2	0	1	1	5 (2)	3	1 (3)	2	2	0	25 (9)	12	6	1
31	MF	(Venezuela) Dayana Rodríguez	7 (4)	0	0 (1)	0	0	0	4 (2)	0	4 (1)	0	0 (2)	0	15 (10)	0	3	1
32	GK	(Brazil) Rillary	1	0	0	0	0	0	1	0	0	0	0	0	2	0	0	0
33	DF	(Brazil) Duda Mineira	6	0	0	0	0	0	3 (1)	0	0 (1)	0	0	0	9 (2)	0	1	0
37	DF	(Brazil) Tamires	16 (1)	1	1	0	1	0	2 (2)	1	6	0	2	0	28 (3)	2	5	0
41	GK	(Brazil) Ana Morganti	0	0	0	0	0	0	0	0	0	0	0	0	0	0	0	0
77	FW	(Brazil) Carol Nogueira	2 (2)	0	0	0	0	0	0 (4)	0	0	0	0	0	2 (6)	0	1	0
88	MF	(Brazil) Ana Vitória	5 (4)	0	2	0	1	0	3 (1)	1	1 (2)	0	2	0	15 (7)	1	2	0
99	DF	(Brazil) Érika	12 (1)	1	2	0	0 (1)	0	5	2	5	0	0 (1)	0	24 (3)	3	4	0
Players transferred out during the season
3	DF	(Brazil) Leticia Teles	2 (4)	0	0	0	1	0	5	0	0	0	2	0	10 (4)	0	3	0
15	MF	(Brazil) Juliana Passari	0	0	0	0	0	0	0	0	0	0	0	0	0	0	0	0
18	MF	(Brazil) Manu Olivan	0	0	0	0	0	0	0 (2)	0	0	0	0	0	0 (2)	0	0	0
47	MF	(Brazil) Ellen	0	0	0	0	0	0	0	0	0	0	0	0	0	0	0	0

=== Goals ===
As of 17 November 2026

Rank	Player	BR	CB	SB	CP	CL	FCC	Total
1	(Brazil) Gabi Zanotti	7	1	0	1	5	2	16
2	(Brazil) Victória	6	0	0	0	6	1	13
3	(Brazil) Jaqueline	6	0	1	3	2	0	12
4	(Brazil) Jhonson	7	0	0	4	0	0	11
5	(Brazil) Ariel Godoi	2	0	0	6	0	0	8
5	(Brazil) Duda Sampaio	4	0	0	0	4	0	8
7	(Brazil) Andressa Alves	4	0	0	0	1	0	5
7	(Uruguay) Belén Aquino	3	0	0	0	2	0	5
7	(Colombia) Gisela Robledo	2	0	0	1	2	0	5
10	(Brazil) Érika	1	0	0	2	0	0	3
10	(Brazil) Thaís Ferreira	3	0	0	0	0	0	3
12	(Brazil) Letícia Monteiro	1	0	0	0	1	0	2
12	(Brazil) Tamires	1	0	0	1	0	0	2
14	(Brazil) Ana Vitória	0	0	0	1	0	0	1
14	(Colombia) Paola García	0	0	0	0	1	0	1
14	(Brazil) Gi Fernandes	0	0	0	0	1	0	1
14	(Brazil) Ivana Fuso	1	0	0	0	0	0	1
14	(Brazil) Juliete	1	0	0	0	0	0	1
14	(Brazil) Rhaizza	1	0	0	0	0	0	1
Own goals		0	0	0	1	0	0	1
Total		50	1	1	20	25	3	101

=== Assists ===
As of 17 November 2026

Rank	Player	BR	CB	SB	CP	CL	FCC	Total
1	(Uruguay) Belén Aquino	8	0	0	2	0	0	10
2	(Brazil) Gabi Zanotti	8	0	0	0	0	0	8
2	(Brazil) Victória	3	0	0	1	4	0	8
4	(Brazil) Andressa Alves	5	0	0	0	1	1	7
4	(Brazil) Tamires	3	0	0	1	2	1	7
6	(Brazil) Gi Fernandes	0	0	0	1	3	0	4
6	(Brazil) Ivana Fuso	2	0	0	1	1	0	4
6	(Brazil) Jaqueline	2	1	0	0	1	0	4
6	(Brazil) Letícia Monteiro	1	0	0	1	2	0	4
6	(Colombia) Gisela Robledo	2	0	0	2	0	0	4
11	(Brazil) Juliete	1	0	0	2	0	0	3
12	(Brazil) Duda Mineira	0	0	0	2	0	0	2
12	(Brazil) Duda Sampaio	0	0	1	0	1	0	2
14	(Brazil) Ariel Godoi	1	0	0	0	0	0	1
14	(Brazil) Carol Nogueira	1	0	0	0	0	0	1
14	(Brazil) Érika	1	0	0	0	0	0	1
14	(Colombia) Paola García	0	0	0	0	1	0	1
14	(Brazil) Jhonson	1	0	0	0	0	0	1
Total		38	1	1	13	16	2	71

=== Disciplinary record ===
As of 17 November 2026

N	P	Nat.	Name	BR			CB			SB			CP			CL			FCC			Total			Notes
N	P	Nat.	Name	Yellow card	Second yellow card	Red card	Yellow card	Second yellow card	Red card	Yellow card	Second yellow card	Red card	Yellow card	Second yellow card	Red card	Yellow card	Second yellow card	Red card	Yellow card	Second yellow card	Red card	Yellow card	Second yellow card	Red card	Notes
30	FW	(Brazil)	Jaqueline	4		1	2															6		1	
4	DF	(Brazil)	Thaís Regina			1							1			2						3		1	
29	FW	(Brazil)	Rhaizza	1					1				1									2		1	
31	MF	(Venezuela)	Dayana Rodríguez	1	1											1						2	1		
25	FW	(Uruguay)	Belén Aquino	4												1						5			
10	MF	(Brazil)	Gabi Zanotti	2			2						1									5			
13	FW	(Brazil)	Ivana Fuso	3			1									1						5			
37	DF	(Brazil)	Tamires	3			1												1			5			
99	DF	(Brazil)	Érika	2									1			1						4			
23	DF	(Brazil)	Gi Fernandes	2												1			1			4			
88	MF	(Brazil)	Ana Vitória	1			1												1			3			
8	FW	(Brazil)	Andressa Alves	1															2			3			
9	DF	(Brazil)	Jhonson	3																		3			
3	DF	(Brazil)	Leticia Teles	2									1									3			
17	FW	(Brazil)	Victória	2									1									3			
23	MF	(Colombia)	Paola García	1									1									2			
22	DF	(Brazil)	Juliete	1			1															2			
11	FW	(Brazil)	Ariel Godoi	1																		1			
77	FW	(Brazil)	Carol Nogueira	1																		1			
33	DF	(Brazil)	Duda Mineira	1																		1			
27	MF	(Brazil)	Duda Sampaio	1																		1			
12	GK	(Brazil)	Letícia	1																		1			
19	MF	(Brazil)	Letícia Monteiro													1						1			
1	GK	(Brazil)	Nicole	1																		1			
7	FW	(Colombia)	Gisela Robledo							1												1			
5	DF	(Brazil)	Thaís Ferreira	1																		1			

Only competitive matches
(yellow card) = Number of bookings; (second yellow card) = Number of sending offs after a second yellow card; (red card) = Number of sending offs by a direct red card.

== Friendlies ==
9 April 2026 Teal Rising Cup Semifinal	Kansas City Current (United States)	2–1	(Brazil) Corinthians	Kansas City, United States
20:00 UTC−5	Hopkins 39'; Clark 82'	Report	Jaqueline 75'	Stadium: CPKC Stadium; Attendance: Undisclosed; Referee: John Matto

12 April 2026 Teal Rising Cup 3rd place match	Corinthians (Brazil)	8–0	(Mexico) América	Kansas City, United States
17:00 UTC−5	Gabi Zanotti 44'; Jaqueline 54', 63'; García 56'; Letícia Monteiro 67'; Carol Nogueira 76', 84'; Ariel Godoi 80'	Report		Stadium: CPKC Stadium; Attendance: Undisclosed; Referee: Marie Durr

== Competitions ==
=== Overall record ===
Competition	First match	Last match	Starting round	Final position	Record							
Competition	First match	Last match	Starting round	Final position	Pld	W	D	L	GF	GA	GD	Win %
Série A1	13 February 2026	3 October 2026	Matchday 1	Runners-up	23	16	3	4	50	22	+28	69.57
Copa do Brasil	27 May 2026	20 July 2026	Third round	Round of 16	2	1	0	1	1	1	+0	50.00
Supercopa do Brasil	7 February 2026		Final	Runners-up	1	0	1	0	1	1	+0	0.00
Campeonato Paulista	7 May 2026	TBD	Matchday 1	TBD	8	4	1	3	20	10	+10	50.00
Copa Libertadores	15 October 2026	31 October 2026	Group stage	Runners-up	6	5	1	0	25	6	+19	83.33
FIFA Champions Cup	28 January 2026	1 February 2026	Semi-finals	Runners-up	2	1	0	1	3	3	+0	50.00
Total					42	27	6	9	100	43	+57	64.29

Last updated: 17 November 2026
Source: Competitions

=== Campeonato Brasileiro ===
==== League phase ====
For this year's Série A1, the first stage featured an increase from 16 to 18 teams, but maintained the original format with a single-round first phase and then the knockout stages at the end with the top 8 clubs. The two overall worst teams will be relegated.

===== League table =====
Pos	Team	Pld	W	D	L	GF	GA	GD	Pts	Qualification or relegation
1	São Paulo	17	13	2	2	31	11	+20	41	Advance to the quarter-finals
2	Corinthians	17	12	2	3	42	18	+24	38	Advance to the quarter-finals
3	Palmeiras	17	10	6	1	32	11	+21	36	Advance to the quarter-finals
4	Ferroviária	17	8	7	2	23	14	+9	31	Advance to the quarter-finals
5	Flamengo	17	8	6	3	29	20	+9	30	Advance to the quarter-finals

Source: CBF

===== Results summary =====
Overall								Home						Away					
Pld	W	D	L	GF	GA	GD	Pts	W	D	L	GF	GA	GD	W	D	L	GF	GA	GD
17	12	2	3	42	18	+24	38	7	1	1	29	10	+19	5	1	2	13	8	+5

Last updated: 22 August 2026.
Source: CBF

===== Result by round =====
Round	1	2	3	4	5	6	7	8	9	10	11	12	13	14	15	16	17
Ground	A	H	A	H	A	H	A	H	A	H	A	H	H	A	H	A	H
Result	W	D	L	W	W	W	W	W	W	W	L	W	W	W	W	D	L
Position	8	5	9	5	4	1	1	1	1	1	1	1	1	1	1	1	2
Points	3	4	4	7	10	13	16	19	22	25	25	28	31	34	37	38	38

Updated to match(es) played on 22 August 2026. Source: CBF
A = Away; H = Home; W = Win; D = Draw; L = Loss; P = Postponed

===== Matches =====
13 February 2026 1	Atlético Mineiro	0–1	Corinthians	Belo Horizonte
21:00 UTC−3		Report	Letícia Monteiro 36'	Stadium: Arena MRV; Attendance: Undisclosed; Referee: Deborah Cecilia Cruz Correia

20 February 2026 2	Corinthians	2–2	Fluminense	São Paulo
21:30 UTC−3	Aquino 8'; Jaqueline 20'	Report	Sochor 34'; Bruna Pelé 90+5'	Stadium: Neo Química Arena (Note: Corinthians played these home matches at Neo Química Arena instead of their other regular stadium Parque São Jorge, which was prohitibed by the Federação Paulista de Futebol (FPF) since May 2025 of hosting games at night due to issues with the stadium's lighting.); Attendance: 5,178; Referee: Francielly Fernanda Lima de Castro

13 March 2026 3	Palmeiras	3–2	Corinthians	Barueri
21:30 UTC−3	Fe Palermo 54'; Raíssa Bahia 66'; Taina Maranhão 79'	Report	Jhonson 7'; Duda Sampaio 18'	Stadium: Arena Crefisa Barueri; Attendance: Undisclosed; Referee: Charly Wendy Straub Deretti

23 March 2026 4	Corinthians	4–0	América Mineiro	São Paulo
21:00 UTC−3	Gabi Zanotti 3', 82'; Érika 26'; Andressa Alves 38'	Report		Stadium: Neo Química Arena; Attendance: 4,147; Referee: Rejane Caetano Da Silva

27 March 2026 5	Botafogo	1–3	Corinthians	Rio de Janeiro
19:00 UTC−3	Rebeca 87'	Report	Victória 20'; Gabi Zanotti 35'; Jaqueline 46'	Stadium: Estádio Olímpico Nilton Santos; Attendance: Undisclosed; Referee: Elizabete Esmeralda Gomes

3 April 2026 6	Corinthians	5–1	Red Bull Bragantino	São Paulo
21:00 UTC−3	Gabi Zanotti 4', 32'; Andressa Alves 8'; Aquino 22'; Victória 72'	Report	Miriã 35'	Stadium: Parque São Jorge; Attendance: 929; Referee: Gleika Oliveira Pinheiro
Note: The match was originally scheduled for 31 March, but it was postponed due to a broadcast request.

20 April 2026 7	Juventude	0–1	Corinthians	Bento Gonçalves
21:00 UTC−3		Report	Gabi Zanotti 45'	Stadium: Parque Esportivo Montanha dos Vinhedos (Note: Juventude was expected to play their home match at Estádio Homero Soldatelli, Flores da Cunha, but played at Parque Esportivo Montanha dos Vinhedos, Bento Gonçalves instead.); Attendance: Undisclosed; Referee: Elizabete Esmeralda Gomes

24 April 2026 8	Corinthians	3–1	Ferroviária	São Paulo
21:00 UTC−3	Jaqueline 15', 62'; Jhonson 84'	Report	Maressa 68' (pen.)	Stadium: Parque São Jorge; Attendance: 607; Referee: Francielly Fernanda Lima de Castro

1 May 2026 9	Grêmio	0–2	Corinthians	Porto Alegre
17:30 UTC−3		Report	Thaís Ferreira 2'; Ivana Fuso 75'	Stadium: Estádio Passo D'Areia; Attendance: Undisclosed; Referee: Tainan Bordignon Somensi

11 May 2026 10	Corinthians	2–1	São Paulo	São Paulo
21:30 UTC−3	Duda Sampaio 21'; Andressa Alves 27'	Report	Duda Serrana 66'	Stadium: Parque São Jorge; Attendance: 363; Referee: Daiane Muniz
Note: The match was originally scheduled for 8 May, but it was postponed due to table adjustments.

18 May 2026 11	Cruzeiro	3–2	Corinthians	Sete Lagoas
21:00 UTC−3	Letícia Ferreira 5'; Paloma Maciel 23'; Pri Back 83'	Report	Andressa Alves 24'; Jaqueline 51'	Stadium: Arena do Jacaré; Attendance: Undisclosed; Referee: Andressa Hartmann

25 May 2026 12	Corinthians	4–1	Mixto	São Paulo
21:00 UTC−3	Jhonson 7'; Duda Sampaio 17', 20'; Ariel Godoi 81'	Report	Gessica 61'	Stadium: Estádio do Canindé (Note: Corinthians played this home match at Estádio do Canindé, São Paulo instead of their regular stadium Parque São Jorge, São Paulo due to a scheduled counselors assembly at Parque São Jorge, which deliberated on the expulsion of former president Andrés Sánchez from the club's membership.); Attendance: Undisclosed; Referee: Cassia Franca de Souza

26 July 2026 13	Corinthians	4–0	Vitória	São Paulo
11:00 UTC−3	Victória 40', 64'; Ariel Godoi 45' (pen.); Robledo 58'	Report		Stadium: Estádio do Canindé (Note: Corinthians played this home match at Estádio do Canindé, São Paulo instead of their regular stadium Parque São Jorge, São Paulo due to the poor quality of the stadium's pitch.); Attendance: 591; Referee: Michelle Peixoto Safatle
Note: The match was originally scheduled for 27 July, but it was anticipated due to a broadcast request.

3 August 2026 14	Flamengo	0–1	Corinthians	Rio de Janeiro
18:30 UTC−3		Report	Jhonson 12'	Stadium: Estádio Luso Brasileiro; Attendance: Undisclosed; Referee: Deborah Cecilia Cruz Correia

9 August 2026 15	Corinthians	4–1	Santos	São Paulo
16:00 UTC−3	Aquino 11'; Thaís Ferreira 45+2'; Robledo 76'; Rhaizza 90+3'	Report	Ketlen 79'	Stadium: Estádio do Canindé (Note: Corinthians played this home match at Estádio do Canindé, São Paulo instead of their regular stadium Parque São Jorge, São Paulo due to the stadium's pitch maintenance.); Attendance: 402; Referee: Francielly Fernanda Lima de Castro

15 August 2026 16	Bahia	1–1	Corinthians	Salvador
16:00 UTC−3	Gómez 47'	Report	Jaqueline 2'	Stadium: Casa de Apostas Arena Fonte Nova (Note: Bahia was expected to play their home match at Superbet Arena, Feira de Santana, but played at Casa de Apostas Arena Fonte Nova, Salvador instead.); Attendance: Undisclosed; Referee: Andreza Helena de Siqueira

22 August 2026 17	Corinthians	1–3	Internacional	São Paulo
18:00 UTC−3	Victória 89' (pen.)	Report	Jaimes 14', 31'; Valéria 64'	Stadium: Parque São Jorge; Attendance: Undisclosed; Referee: Cassia França de Souza

==== Knockout stages ====
31 August 2026 Quarter-finals	Cruzeiro	0–1	Corinthians	Belo Horizonte
19:15 UTC−3		Report	Victória 90+5'	Stadium: Arena Independência; Attendance: Undisclosed; Referee: Elizabete Esmeralda Cordeiro dos Santos Gomes

7 September 2026 Quarter-finals	Corinthians	3–1 (4–1 agg.)	Cruzeiro	São Paulo
17:00 UTC−3	Jhonson 20'; Tamires 28'; Thaís Ferreira 61'	Report	Marília 6'	Stadium: Estádio do Canindé (Note: Corinthians played their home match at Estádio do Canindé, São Paulo instead of their regular stadium Parque São Jorge, São Paulo, which did not meet CBF requirements.); Attendance: 2,201; Referee: Rejane Caetano da Silva

15 September 2026 Semi-finals	Bahia	0–1	Corinthians	Salvador
21:30 UTC−3		Report	Jhonson 14'	Stadium: Casa de Apostas Arena Fonte Nova; Attendance: 5,811; Referee: Andreza Helena de Siqueira

21 September 2026 Semi-finals	Corinthians	0–1 (2–0 agg.)	Bahia	São Paulo
21:30 UTC−3	Jhonson 45'	Report		Stadium: Neo Química Arena; Attendance: 9,755; Referee: Deborah Cecilia Cruz Correia

26 September 2026 Finals	Corinthians	1–2	São Paulo	São Paulo
16:30 UTC−3	Gabi Zanotti 10'	Report	Crivelari 21'; Isa Guimarães 68'	Stadium: Neo Química Arena; Attendance: 21,871; Referee: Francielly Fernanda Lima de Castro

3 October 2026 Finals	São Paulo	1–1 (3–2 agg.)	Corinthians	São Paulo
16:30 UTC−3	Bia Menezes 10'	Report	Juliete 19'	Stadium: MorumBIS; Attendance: 49,405; Referee: Daiane Muniz
Note: The attendance was a South American record for a women's club match.

=== Copa do Brasil ===
30 May 2026 Third round	Palmeiras	0–1	Corinthians	São Paulo
11:00 UTC−3		Report	Gabi Zanotti 88'	Stadium: Allianz Parque; Attendance: Undisclosed; Referee: Daiane Muniz

20 July 2026 Round of 16	Ferroviária	1–0	Corinthians	Araraquara
20:00 UTC−3	Andressa 14'	Report		Stadium: Fonte Luminosa; Attendance: Undisclosed; Referee: Jéssica Aparecida Milani
Note: The match was originally scheduled for 23 July, but it was anticipated due to a Ferroviária request.

=== Supercopa do Brasil ===
This year's Supercopa do Brasil will move from the original format since its inception in 2022. Instead of the 8-team single-elimination tournament, the tournament will feature a single match between the Série A1 and Copa do Brasil winners.

7 February 2026 Final	Palmeiras	1–1 (5–4 p)	Corinthians	Barueri
16:00 UTC−3	Bia Zaneratto 40'	Report	Jaqueline 7'	Stadium: Arena Crefisa Barueri; Attendance: 2,576; Referee: Edina Alves Batista
	Penalties
	Bia Zaneratto (penalty scored); Poliana (penalty scored); Duda Santos (penalty scored); Glaucia (penalty missed); Brena (penalty missed); Pati Maldaner (penalty scored); Taina Maranhão (penalty scored)		(penalty missed) Gabi Zanotti; (penalty scored) Victória; (penalty scored) Thaís Ferreira; (penalty scored) Letícia Monteiro; (penalty missed) Jhonson; (penalty scored) Robledo; (penalty missed) Tamires
Note: The match was originally scheduled for 8 February at a venue to be decided. The date was later changed and a draw was held to decide who would be the home team as Palmeiras was against the match taking place at a neutral venue.

=== Campeonato Paulista ===
The 2026 Campeonato Paulista will feature a format change: eight teams will participate in a single-league format of seven rounds. The first two teams will qualify directly to the semi-finals and there will be an extra two-legged tie knockout-stage featuring the four teams between 3rd to 6th place to determine the next two semi-finalists. The semis and finals will also be two-legged ties.

==== First stage ====
===== Result by round =====
Round	1	2	3	4	5	6	7
Ground	H	A	H	H	A	A	H
Result	L	W	D	W	L	W	W
Position	6	3	2	2	4	3	3
Points	0	3	4	7	7	10	13

Updated to match(es) played on 26 August 2026. Source: FPF
A = Away; H = Home; W = Win; D = Draw; L = Loss; P = Postponed

===== Matches =====
7 May 2026 1	Corinthians	1–2	São Paulo	São Paulo
21:30 UTC−3	Robledo 9'	Report	Pereyra 18'; Mylena Carioca 29'	Stadium: Parque São Jorge; Attendance: Undisclosed; Referee: Jéssica Aparecida Milani

14 May 2026 2	Red Bull Bragantino	0–6	Corinthians	Rio Claro
17:30 UTC−3		Report	Jhonson 19', 47'; Ariel Godoi 28', 47', 63'; Ana Vitória 44'	Stadium: Estádio Benito Agnelo Castellano (Note: Red Bull Bragantino played their home match at Estádio Benito Agnelo Castellano, Rio Claro instead of their regular stadium Estádio Gabriel Marques da Silva, Santana de Parnaíba.); Attendance: Undisclosed; Referee: Talita Ximenes de Freitas

21 May 2026 3	Corinthians	2–2	Santos	São Paulo
19:15 UTC−3	Érika 21'; Gabi Zanotti 58'	Report	Carol Baiana 17'; Analuyza 81'	Stadium: Parque São Jorge; Attendance: 377; Referee: Leonardo Delfino de Abreu Lima

17 July 2026 4	Corinthians	1–0	Ferroviária	São Paulo
19:00 UTC−3	Jhonson 90+4'	Report		Stadium: Parque São Jorge; Attendance: 672; Referee: Talita Ximenes de Freitas

29 July 2026 5	Palmeiras	1–0	Corinthians	Barueri
19:00 UTC−3	Giovanna Campiolo 45+6'	Report		Stadium: Arena Crefisa Barueri; Attendance: Undisclosed; Referee: Murilo Tarrega Victor

12 August 2026 6	Mirassol	1–4	Corinthians	Bálsamo
17:00 UTC−3	Giovana Borges 16'	Report	Jaqueline 6', 23'; Siméia 72' (o.g.); Érika 90+6'	Stadium: Estádio Municipal Manoel Francisco Ferreira; Attendance: Undisclosed; Referee: Jéssica Aparecida Milani

26 August 2026 7	Corinthians	6–2	Taubaté	São Paulo
18:30 UTC−3	Ariel Godoi 16', 79', 89'; Jaqueline 37'; Jhonson 67'; Tamires 74'	Report	Jissele 10'; Yolanda 90+5' (pen.)	Stadium: Parque São Jorge; Attendance: Undisclosed; Referee: Vinicius Nunes Lima dos Santos

==== Knockout stages ====
17 November 2026 Play-in	Red Bull Bragantino	2–0	Corinthians	Bragança Paulista
21:00 UTC−3	Miriã 27'; Lurdinha 78'	Report		Stadium: Estádio Cícero de Souza Marques; Attendance: Undisclosed; Referee: Rodrigo Fernandes Júnior

22 November 2026 Play-in	Corinthians	v	Red Bull Bragantino	São Paulo
11:00 UTC−3				Stadium: Parque São Jorge

=== Copa Libertadores ===
==== Group stage ====
Pos	Team	Pld	W	D	L	GF	GA	GD	Pts	Qualification
1	(Brazil) Corinthians	3	3	0	0	14	1	+13	9	Quarter-finals
2	(Colombia) Santa Fe	3	2	0	1	6	8	−2	6	Quarter-finals
3	(Chile) Colo-Colo	3	1	0	2	4	4	0	3	
4	(Venezuela) Caracas	3	0	0	3	2	13	−11	0	

First match(es) will be played: TBD October 2026. Source: CONMEBOL

15 October 2026 1	Corinthians (Brazil)	2–0	(Chile) Colo-Colo	Quito, Ecuador
15:00 UTC−5	Victória 5'; Jaqueline 71' (pen.)	Report		Stadium: Estadio Rodrigo Paz Delgado; Attendance: Undisclosed; Referee: Jennifer Canchingre (Ecuador)

18 October 2026 2	Corinthians (Brazil)	7–0	(Venezuela) Caracas	Quito, Ecuador
19:00 UTC−5	Andressa Alves 13'; Jaqueline 20'; Duda Sampaio 30', 67'; García 57' (pen.); Gabi Zanotti 76'; Robledo 90+1'	Report		Stadium: Estadio Rodrigo Paz Delgado; Attendance: Undisclosed; Referee: Nadia Fuques (Uruguay)

21 October 2026 3	Santa Fe (Colombia)	1–5	(Brazil) Corinthians	Quito, Ecuador
15:00 UTC−5	Ibargüen 4'	Report	Duda Sampaio 6'; Victória 44' (pen.); Aquino 50', 60'; Robledo 84'	Stadium: Estadio Banco Guayaquil; Attendance: Undisclosed; Referee: Roberta Echeverría (Argentina)

==== Knockout stages ====
24 October 2026 Quarter-finals	Corinthians (Brazil)	5–0	(Ecuador) Dragonas IDV	Quito, Ecuador
19:00 UTC−5	Duda Sampaio 49'; Victória 51', 65'; Gabi Zanotti 62', 90+3'	Report		Stadium: Estadio Banco Guayaquil; Attendance: Undisclosed; Referee: Stefani Escobar (Venezuela)

28 October 2026 Semi-finals	Corinthians (Brazil)	2–1	(Colombia) Santa Fe	Quito, Ecuador
15:00 UTC−5	Letícia Monteiro 36'; Gi Fernandes 76'	Report	Garavito 29'	Stadium: Estadio Rodrigo Paz Delgado; Attendance: Undisclosed; Referee: Roberta Echeverría (Argentina)

31 October 2026 Final	Corinthians (Brazil)	4–4 (4–5 p)	(Brazil) Cruzeiro	Quito, Ecuador
19:00 UTC−5	Gabi Zanotti 4', 42'; Victória 49', 68'	Report	Byanca Brasil 52'; Vitória Calhau 58' (pen.); Ketlin 75'; Letícia Ferreira 90+1'	Stadium: Estadio Rodrigo Paz Delgado; Attendance: Undisclosed; Referee: Dione Rissios (Chile)
	Penalties
	Victória (penalty scored); Duda Sampaio (penalty scored); Jaqueline (penalty missed); Aquino (penalty scored); Thaís Ferreira (penalty scored); Robledo (penalty missed); Gi Fernandes (penalty missed)		(penalty scored) Byanca Brasil; (penalty scored) Letícia Ferreira; (penalty missed) Pri Back; (penalty scored) Romero; (penalty scored) Vitória Calhau; (penalty missed) Bedoya; (penalty scored) Milena Ferreira

=== FIFA Women's Champions Cup ===
28 January 2026 Semi-finals	Gotham FC (United States)	0–1	(Brazil) Corinthians	London, England
12:30 UTC+0		Report	Gabi Zanotti 83'	Stadium: Brentford Community Stadium; Attendance: 6,177; Referee: Tess Olofsson (Sweden)

1 February 2026 Final	Arsenal (England)	3–2 (a.e.t.)	(Brazil) Corinthians	London, England
18:00 UTC+0	Smith 15'; Wubben-Moy 58'; Foord 104'	Report	Gabi Zanotti 21'; Victória 90+6' (pen.)	Stadium: Emirates Stadium; Attendance: 25,031; Referee: Katia Itzel García (Mexico)

== See also ==
- List of SC Corinthians Paulista (women) seasons
