= 2025 Copa Libertadores Femenina =

17th edition of the CONMEBOL Libertadores Femenina

Tournament details
- Host country: Argentina
- Cities: Morón and Banfield
- Dates: 2–18 October 2025
- Teams: 16 (from 10 associations)
- Venues: 2 (in 2 host cities)

Final positions
- Champions: (Brazil) Corinthians (6th title)
- Runners-up: (Colombia) Deportivo Cali
- Third place: (Brazil) Ferroviária
- Fourth place: (Chile) Colo-Colo

Tournament statistics
- Matches played: 32
- Goals scored: 61 (1.91 per match)
- Top scorer: Gabi Zanotti (6 goals)

The 2025 Copa CONMEBOL Libertadores Femenina was the 17th edition of the CONMEBOL Libertadores Femenina (also referred to as the Copa Libertadores Femenina), South America's premier women's club football tournament organized by CONMEBOL. The competition was held in Argentina from 2 to 18 October 2025.

Brazilian club Corinthians were the champions, winning their sixth Copa Libertadores Femenina title and third in a row after defeating Colombian club Deportivo Cali on penalty kicks in the final. As champions, Corinthians qualified for the inaugural FIFA Women's Champions Cup held in 2026.

== Format ==
For the group stage, the 16 teams were drawn into four groups. Teams in each group played one another in a round-robin basis, with the top two teams of each group advancing to the quarter-finals. Starting from the quarter-finals, the teams played a single-elimination tournament.

== Teams ==
The 16 participating teams were:

- the champions of all ten CONMEBOL associations
- the title holders
- an additional team from the host association
- four additional teams from associations with the best historical performance in the tournament (associations in **bold** receive two berths according to the points total until the 2024 edition).
  1. Brazil: 300 points
  2. Colombia: 170 points
  3. Chile: 160 points
  4. Paraguay: 127 points
  5. Argentina: 118 points
  6. Venezuela: 81 points
  7. Ecuador: 77 points
  8. Uruguay: 55 points
  9. Peru: 45 points
  10. Bolivia: 42 points

| Association | Team | Qualifying method | Participation | Previous best result |
|---|---|---|---|---|
| Argentina (hosts) | Boca Juniors (Argentina 1) | 2024 Apertura champions | 10th | Runners-up (2022) |
| Argentina (hosts) | San Lorenzo (Argentina 2) | 2024 Clausura champions | 3rd | Group stage (2009, 2021) |
| Bolivia | Always Ready | 2025 Liga Femenina de Fútbol Boliviano champions | 4th | Group stage (2022, 2023, 2024) |
| Brazil | Corinthians (Brazil 1) | 2024 Copa Libertadores Femenina champions | 8th (Note: Corinthians won the 2017 title in a partnership with Audax. They created their own team for the 2018 season.) | **Champions** (2017, 2019, 2021, 2023, 2024) |
| Brazil | São Paulo (Brazil 2) | 2024 Brasileirão Feminino Neonergia runners-up (Note: As the title holders, Corinthians, were also the 2024 Brasileirão Feminino Neonergia champions, runners-up São Paulo and third place Ferroviária qualified for the Brazil 2 and Brazil 3 berths, respectively.) | 1st | — |
| Brazil | Ferroviária (Brazil 3) | 2024 Brasileirão Feminino Neonergia third place | 8th | **Champions** (2015, 2020) |
| Chile | Colo-Colo (Chile 1) | 2024 Campeonato Femenino SQM champions | 11th | **Champions** (2012) |
| Chile | Universidad de Chile (Chile 2) | 2024 Campeonato Femenino SQM runners-up | 5th | Fourth place (2020) |
| Colombia | Deportivo Cali (Colombia 1) | 2025 Liga Femenina BetPlay DIMAYOR champions | 4th | Fourth place (2022) |
| Colombia | Santa Fe (Colombia 2) | 2025 Liga Femenina BetPlay DIMAYOR runners-up | 6th | Runners-up (2021, 2024) |
| Ecuador | Dragonas IDV | 2025 Superliga Femenina Ecuabet champions | 3rd | Fourth place (2024) |
| Paraguay | Libertad (Paraguay 1) | 2024 Campeonato Anual FEM champions | 6th (Note: Libertad's first four participations were in a partnership with Sportivo Limpeño.) | Group stage (2019, 2020, 2022, 2023, 2024) |
| Paraguay | Olimpia (Paraguay 2) | 2024 Campeonato Anual FEM runners-up | 4th | Quarter-finals (2023, 2024) |
| Peru | Alianza Lima | 2025 Liga Femenina Apuesta Total Apertura winners | 4th | Quarter-finals (2021, 2024) |
| Uruguay | Nacional | 2024 Torneo Rexona de Fútbol Femenino champions | 7th | Fourth place (2021) |
| Venezuela | ADIFFEM | 2025 Liga FUTVE Femenina champions | 2nd | Group stage (2024) |

== Venues ==
On 3 September 2025, CONMEBOL announced Estadio Nuevo Francisco Urbano in Morón and Estadio Florencio Sola in Banfield, both in Greater Buenos Aires, as the venues for the event.

| Morón | 2025 Copa Libertadores Femenina is located in Greater Buenos Aires | Banfield |
|---|---|---|
| Estadio Nuevo Francisco Urbano | 2025 Copa Libertadores Femenina is located in Greater Buenos Aires | Estadio Florencio Sola |
| Capacity: 32,000 | 2025 Copa Libertadores Femenina is located in Greater Buenos Aires | Capacity: 34,900 |

== Match officials ==
On 22 September 2025, CONMEBOL announced the referees and assistant referees appointed for the tournament.

| Association | Referees | Assistant referees |
|---|---|---|
| Argentina | Laura Fortunato; Salomé di Iorio | Gisela Trucco; Carla López |
| Bolivia | Adriana Farfán; Alejandra Quisbert; Wilma Balderrama | Elizabeth Blanco; María Cabezas |
| Brazil | Edina Alves; Daiane Muniz | Neuza Back; Fabrini Bevilaqua |
| Chile | Dione Rissios | Leslie Vásquez; Yomara Salazar |
| Colombia | Danna Victorino; María Victoria Daza | Jenny Torres; Carolina Vicuña |
| Ecuador | Marcelly Zambrano; Susana Corella | Mónica Amboya; Stefanía Paguay |
| Paraguay | Zulma Quiñónez | Nadia Weiler; Nancy Fernández |
| Peru | Elizabeth Tintaya | Diana Ruiz |
| Uruguay | Nadia Fuques; Anahí Fernández | Adela Sánchez; Sofía Sarzay |
| Venezuela | Emikar Calderas; Stefani Escobar | Migdalia Rodríguez; Thaity Dugarte; Elibith Higuera |

== Draw ==
The draw for the tournament was held on 4 September 2025, 12:00 PYT (UTC−3), at the CONMEBOL Convention Center in Luque, Paraguay. The 16 teams were drawn into four groups of four.

Two teams were directly assigned as seeds of groups A and B:

- To Group A: the 2024 Copa Libertadores Femenina champions, Corinthians (Brazil 1)
- To Group B: the champions of the host association, Boca Juniors (Argentina 1)

The remaining teams (excluding the four teams from national associations with an extra berth) were seeded into three pots based on the final placement of their national association's club in the previous edition of the tournament, with the highest two (Brazil 2 and Colombia 1) placed in Pot 1, the next four (Argentina 2, Ecuador, Paraguay 1, and Peru) placed in Pot 2 and the lowest four (Chile 1, Uruguay, Venezuela and Bolivia) in Pot 3. The four additional teams from associations with the best historical performance (Brazil 3, Chile 2, Colombia 2 and Paraguay 2) were seeded into Pot 4. From Pot 1, the first team drawn was placed into Group C and the second team drawn placed into Group D, both teams assigned to position 1 in their group. From each remaining pot, the first team drawn was placed into Group A, the second team drawn placed into Group B, the third team drawn placed into Group C and the final team drawn placed into Group D, with teams from Pot 2, 3 and 4 assigned to positions 2, 3 and 4 in their group. Teams from the same association could not be drawn into the same group.

| Pot 1 | Pot 2 | Pot 3 | Pot 4 |
|---|---|---|---|
| (Brazil) São Paulo; (Colombia) Deportivo Cali^{[1]} | (Argentina) San Lorenzo; (Ecuador) Dragonas IDV^{[1]}; (Paraguay) Libertad; (Peru) Alianza Lima | (Chile) Colo-Colo; (Uruguay) Nacional; (Venezuela) ADIFFEM; (Bolivia) Always Ready | (Brazil) Ferroviária; Universidad de Chile; (Colombia) Santa Fe^{[1]}; (Paraguay) Olimpia |

^{1} The draw was held before the identities of Colombia 1 (Deportivo Cali), Colombia 2 (Santa Fe), and Ecuador (Dragonas IDV) were known.

The draw resulted in the following groups:

Group A
| Pos | Team |
|---|---|
| A1 | (Brazil) Corinthians |
| A2 | (Ecuador) Dragonas IDV |
| A3 | (Bolivia) Always Ready |
| A4 | (Colombia) Santa Fe |

Group B
| Pos | Team |
|---|---|
| B1 | (Argentina) Boca Juniors |
| B2 | (Peru) Alianza Lima |
| B3 | (Venezuela) ADIFFEM |
| B4 | (Brazil) Ferroviária |

Group C
| Pos | Team |
|---|---|
| C1 | (Brazil) São Paulo |
| C2 | (Argentina) San Lorenzo |
| C3 | (Chile) Colo-Colo |
| C4 | (Paraguay) Olimpia |

Group D
| Pos | Team |
|---|---|
| D1 | (Colombia) Deportivo Cali |
| D2 | (Paraguay) Libertad |
| D3 | (Uruguay) Nacional |
| D4 | Universidad de Chile |

== Group stage ==
In the group stage, the teams were ranked according to points (3 points for a win, 1 point for a draw, 0 points for a loss). If tied on points, tiebreakers were applied in the following order (Regulations Article 23).

1. Head-to-head result in games between tied teams;
  1. Points obtained in the matches played between the teams in question;
  2. Goal difference in the matches played between the teams in question;
  3. Number of goals scored in the matches played between the teams in question;
2. Goal difference in all group matches;
3. Goals scored in all group matches;
4. Number of red cards;
5. Number of yellow cards;
6. Drawing of lots.

The winners and runners-up of each group advanced to the quarter-finals.

All times are local, ART (UTC−3).

=== Group A ===
| Pos | Team | Pld | W | D | L | GF | GA | GD | Pts | Qualification |
|---|---|---|---|---|---|---|---|---|---|---|
| 1 | (Brazil) Corinthians | 3 | 2 | 1 | 0 | 13 | 1 | +12 | 7 | Quarter-finals |
| 2 | (Ecuador) Dragonas IDV | 3 | 2 | 1 | 0 | 7 | 1 | +6 | 7 | Quarter-finals |
| 3 | (Colombia) Santa Fe | 3 | 1 | 0 | 2 | 7 | 2 | +5 | 3 | |
| 4 | (Bolivia) Always Ready | 3 | 0 | 0 | 3 | 0 | 23 | −23 | 0 | |

Source: CONMEBOL
2 October 2025
16:00

| Corinthians (Brazil) | 1–1 | (Ecuador) Dragonas IDV |
|---|---|---|
| Gabi Zanotti 12' (pen.) | Report | Valencia 90+4' |

Estadio Florencio Sola, Banfield
Referee: Laura Fortunato (Argentina)
2 October 2025
20:00

| Always Ready (Bolivia) | 0–7 | (Colombia) Santa Fe |
|---|---|---|
| | Report | Viancha 1', 56'; Viso 13'; Carvajal 15'; Garavito 26'; Muñoz 49'; Hernández 62' (pen.) |

Estadio Florencio Sola, Banfield
Referee: Elizabeth Tintaya (Peru)

5 October 2025
16:00

| Corinthians (Brazil) | 11–0 | (Bolivia) Always Ready |
|---|---|---|
| Ariel Godoi 2', 57'; Thaís Regina 17', 79'; Rodríguez 24'; Letícia Monteiro 37', 55'; Gabi Zanotti 51'; Duda Sampaio 83'; Gi Fernandes 87'; Jhonson 90+7' | Report |

Estadio Nuevo Francisco Urbano, Morón
Referee: Stefani Escobar (Venezuela)
5 October 2025
20:00

| Dragonas IDV (Ecuador) | 1–0 | (Colombia) Santa Fe |
|---|---|---|
| Aldana 33' | Report |

Estadio Nuevo Francisco Urbano, Morón
Referee: Nadia Fuques (Uruguay)

8 October 2025
20:00

| Santa Fe (Colombia) | 0–1 | (Brazil) Corinthians |
|---|---|---|
| | Report | Gabi Zanotti 12' |

Estadio Florencio Sola, Banfield
Referee: Zulma Quiñónez (Paraguay)
8 October 2025
20:00

| Dragonas IDV (Ecuador) | 5–0 | (Bolivia) Always Ready |
|---|---|---|
| Vidal 23'; Torres 24', 45+1', 68' (pen.); Corozo 35' | Report |

Estadio Nuevo Francisco Urbano, Morón
Referee: Dione Rissios (Chile)

=== Group B ===
| Pos | Team | Pld | W | D | L | GF | GA | GD | Pts | Qualification |
|---|---|---|---|---|---|---|---|---|---|---|
| 1 | (Brazil) Ferroviária | 3 | 2 | 1 | 0 | 3 | 1 | +2 | 7 | Quarter-finals |
| 2 | (Argentina) Boca Juniors | 3 | 1 | 2 | 0 | 2 | 0 | +2 | 5 | Quarter-finals |
| 3 | (Peru) Alianza Lima | 3 | 0 | 2 | 1 | 2 | 3 | −1 | 2 | |
| 4 | (Venezuela) ADIFFEM | 3 | 0 | 1 | 2 | 1 | 4 | −3 | 1 | |

Source: CONMEBOL
2 October 2025
16:00

| Boca Juniors (Argentina) | 0–0 | (Peru) Alianza Lima |
|---|---|---|
| | Report |

Estadio Nuevo Francisco Urbano, Morón
Referee: Dione Rissios (Chile)
2 October 2025
20:00

| ADIFFEM (Venezuela) | 0–1 | (Brazil) Ferroviária |
|---|---|---|
| | Report | García 87' (o.g.) |

Estadio Nuevo Francisco Urbano, Morón
Referee: Danna Victorino (Colombia)

5 October 2025
16:00

| Boca Juniors (Argentina) | 2–0 | (Venezuela) ADIFFEM |
|---|---|---|
| Troncoso 17'; Ruffini 79' | Report |

Estadio Florencio Sola, Banfield
Referee: Zulma Quiñónez (Paraguay)
5 October 2025
20:00

| Alianza Lima (Peru) | 1–2 | (Brazil) Ferroviária |
|---|---|---|
| Molina 77' | Report | Júlia Beatriz 58'; Mylena Carioca 83' |

Estadio Florencio Sola, Banfield
Referee: Marcelly Zambrano (Ecuador)

8 October 2025
16:00

| Ferroviária (Brazil) | 0–0 | (Argentina) Boca Juniors |
|---|---|---|
| | Report |

Estadio Florencio Sola, Banfield
Referee: Anahí Fernández (Uruguay)
8 October 2025
16:00

| Alianza Lima (Peru) | 1–1 | (Venezuela) ADIFFEM |
|---|---|---|
| Porras 90+4' | Report | Reyes 17' |

Estadio Nuevo Francisco Urbano, Morón
Referee: Danna Victorino (Colombia)

=== Group C ===
| Pos | Team | Pld | W | D | L | GF | GA | GD | Pts | Qualification |
|---|---|---|---|---|---|---|---|---|---|---|
| 1 | (Chile) Colo-Colo | 3 | 3 | 0 | 0 | 4 | 0 | +4 | 9 | Quarter-finals |
| 2 | (Brazil) São Paulo | 3 | 2 | 0 | 1 | 3 | 1 | +2 | 6 | Quarter-finals |
| 3 | (Argentina) San Lorenzo | 3 | 1 | 0 | 2 | 1 | 3 | −2 | 3 | |
| 4 | (Paraguay) Olimpia | 3 | 0 | 0 | 3 | 0 | 4 | −4 | 0 | |

Source: CONMEBOL
3 October 2025
16:00

| Colo-Colo (Chile) | 2–0 | (Paraguay) Olimpia |
|---|---|---|
| Valencia 64', 89' | Report |

Estadio Florencio Sola, Banfield
Referee: Emikar Calderas (Venezuela)
3 October 2025
20:00

| São Paulo (Brazil) | 2–0 | (Argentina) San Lorenzo |
|---|---|---|
| Millene 39'; Camilinha 58' | Report |

Estadio Florencio Sola, Banfield
Referee: Nadia Fuques (Uruguay)

6 October 2025
16:00

| San Lorenzo (Argentina) | 1–0 | (Paraguay) Olimpia |
|---|---|---|
| Egashira 90+2' | Report |

Estadio Nuevo Francisco Urbano, Morón
Referee: María Victoria Daza (Colombia)
6 October 2025
20:00

| São Paulo (Brazil) | 0–1 | (Chile) Colo-Colo |
|---|---|---|
| | Report | Valencia 58' |

Estadio Nuevo Francisco Urbano, Morón
Referee: Adriana Farfán (Bolivia)

9 October 2025
20:00

| Olimpia (Paraguay) | 0–1 | (Brazil) São Paulo |
|---|---|---|
| | Report | Pion 50' (o.g.) |

Estadio Florencio Sola, Banfield
Referee: Marcelly Zambrano (Ecuador)
9 October 2025
20:00

| San Lorenzo (Argentina) | 0–1 | (Chile) Colo-Colo |
|---|---|---|
| | Report | Valencia 44' |

Estadio Nuevo Francisco Urbano, Morón
Referee: Elizabeth Tintaya (Peru)

=== Group D ===
| Pos | Team | Pld | W | D | L | GF | GA | GD | Pts | Qualification |
|---|---|---|---|---|---|---|---|---|---|---|
| 1 | (Colombia) Deportivo Cali | 3 | 2 | 1 | 0 | 4 | 1 | +3 | 7 | Quarter-finals |
| 2 | (Paraguay) Libertad | 3 | 0 | 3 | 0 | 1 | 1 | 0 | 3 | Quarter-finals |
| 3 | (Uruguay) Nacional | 3 | 0 | 2 | 1 | 0 | 1 | −1 | 2 | |
| 4 | Universidad de Chile | 3 | 0 | 2 | 1 | 0 | 2 | −2 | 2 | |

Source: CONMEBOL
3 October 2025
16:00

| Deportivo Cali (Colombia) | 1–1 | (Paraguay) Libertad |
|---|---|---|
| Salazar 15' | Report | Tamay 60' |

Estadio Nuevo Francisco Urbano, Morón
Referee: Adriana Farfán (Bolivia)
3 October 2025
20:00

| Nacional (Uruguay) | 0–0 | Universidad de Chile |
|---|---|---|
| | Report |

Estadio Nuevo Francisco Urbano, Morón
Referee: Edina Alves (Brazil)

6 October 2025
16:00

| Deportivo Cali (Colombia) | 1–0 | (Uruguay) Nacional |
|---|---|---|
| Villanueva 45+3' (o.g.) | Report |

Estadio Florencio Sola, Banfield
Referee: Emikar Calderas (Venezuela)
6 October 2025
20:00

| Libertad (Paraguay) | 0–0 | Universidad de Chile |
|---|---|---|
| | Report |

Estadio Florencio Sola, Banfield
Referee: Laura Fortunato (Argentina)

9 October 2025
16:00

| Universidad de Chile | 0–2 | (Colombia) Deportivo Cali |
|---|---|---|
| | Report | Aponzá 7'; Ibargüen 60' |

Estadio Florencio Sola, Banfield
Referee: Daiane Muniz (Brazil)
9 October 2025
16:00

| Libertad (Paraguay) | 0–0 | (Uruguay) Nacional |
|---|---|---|
| | Report |

Estadio Nuevo Francisco Urbano, Morón
Referee: Edina Alves (Brazil)

== Final stages ==
Starting from the quarter-finals, the teams played a single-elimination tournament. If tied after full time, extra time was not played, and a penalty shoot-out was used to determine the winners (Regulations Article 27).

=== Bracket ===
Quarter-finals
11 October – Morón
(Brazil) Corinthians | 4
(Argentina) Boca Juniors | 0
11 October – Morón
(Brazil) Ferroviária | 3
(Ecuador) Dragonas IDV | 0
12 October – Banfield
(Chile) Colo-Colo | 1
(Paraguay) Libertad | 0
12 October – Banfield
(Colombia) Deportivo Cali | 2
(Brazil) São Paulo | 0

Semi-finals
15 October – Banfield
(Brazil) Corinthians (p) | 1 (6)
(Brazil) Ferroviária | 1 (5)
15 October – Banfield
(Chile) Colo-Colo | 0 (4)
(Colombia) Deportivo Cali (p) | 0 (5)

Final
18 October – Banfield
(Brazil) Corinthians (p) | 0 (5)
(Colombia) Deportivo Cali | 0 (3)
Third place
18 October – Banfield
(Brazil) Ferroviária | 1
(Chile) Colo-Colo | 0

=== Quarter-finals ===
11 October 2025
16:00

| Corinthians (Brazil) | 4–0 | (Argentina) Boca Juniors |
|---|---|---|
| Gabi Zanotti 7' (pen.), 12', 41'; Jhonson 68' | Report |

Estadio Nuevo Francisco Urbano, Morón
Referee: Emikar Calderas (Venezuela)

11 October 2025
20:45 (Note: The Ferroviária vs. Dragonas IDV match, originally scheduled for 20:00 local time, was delayed for 45 minutes due to adverse weather conditions.)

| Ferroviária (Brazil) | 3–0 | (Ecuador) Dragonas IDV |
|---|---|---|
| Raquel 5'; Vendito 30'; Andressa 85' | Report |

Estadio Nuevo Francisco Urbano, Morón
Referee: Zulma Quiñónez (Paraguay)

12 October 2025
16:00

| Colo-Colo (Chile) | 1–0 | (Paraguay) Libertad |
|---|---|---|
| Valencia 60' | Report |

Estadio Florencio Sola, Banfield
Referee: Marcelly Zambrano (Ecuador)

12 October 2025
20:00

| Deportivo Cali (Colombia) | 2–0 | (Brazil) São Paulo |
|---|---|---|
| Marquínez 34'; García 64' (pen.) | Report |

Estadio Florencio Sola, Banfield
Referee: Laura Fortunato (Argentina)

=== Semi-finals ===
15 October 2025
16:00

| Colo-Colo (Chile) | 0–0 | (Colombia) Deportivo Cali |
|---|---|---|
| | Report |
Penalties
| Aedo (penalty scored); Acuña (penalty scored); Valencia (penalty missed); Urrutia (penalty scored); Bogarín (penalty scored) | 4–5 | (penalty scored) García; (penalty scored) Ibargüen; (penalty scored) Aponzá; (penalty scored) Fisgativa; (penalty scored) Perlaza |

Estadio Florencio Sola, Banfield
Referee: Emikar Calderas (Venezuela)

15 October 2025
20:00

| Corinthians (Brazil) | 1–1 | (Brazil) Ferroviária |
|---|---|---|
| Mariza 41' | Report | Andressa 81' |
Penalties
| Gabi Zanotti (penalty scored); Victória (penalty scored); Jaqueline (penalty missed); Mariza (penalty scored); Jhonson (penalty scored); Thaís Ferreira (penalty scored); Duda Sampaio (penalty scored) | 6–5 | (penalty scored) Duda; (penalty scored) Katiuscia; (penalty scored) Rafa Soares; (penalty missed) Mylena Carioca; (penalty scored) Micaelly; (penalty scored) Andressa; (penalty missed) Fátima Dutra |

Estadio Florencio Sola, Banfield
Referee: Nadia Fuques (Uruguay)

=== Third place match ===
18 October 2025
11:00 (Note: The third place and final matches, originally scheduled for 16:00 and 20:00 local time, were brought forward to 11:00 and 16:30 local time.)

| Ferroviária (Brazil) | 1–0 | (Chile) Colo-Colo |
|---|---|---|
| Katiuscia 1' | Report |

Estadio Florencio Sola, Banfield
Referee: Danna Victorino (Colombia)

=== Final ===
Paula Medina (Deportivo Cali) was ruled out of the final due to accumulation of yellow cards.

18 October 2025
16:30

| Corinthians (Brazil) | 0–0 | (Colombia) Deportivo Cali |
|---|---|---|
| | Report |
Penalties
| Gabi Zanotti (penalty scored); Victória (penalty scored); Thaís Ferreira (penalty scored); Mariza (penalty scored); Jhonson (penalty scored) | 5–3 | (penalty scored) García; (penalty missed) Ibargüen; (penalty scored) Aponzá; (penalty scored) Perlaza |

Estadio Florencio Sola, Banfield
Referee: Laura Fortunato (Argentina)

| Corinthians | Deportivo Cali |

| GK | 1 | (Brazil) Nicole |
| DF | 5 | (Brazil) Thaís Ferreira |
| DF | 99 | (Brazil) Érika |
| DF | 20 | (Brazil) Mariza |
| DF | 37 | (Brazil) Tamires | | (substituted off) 57' |
| MF | 31 | (Venezuela) Dayana Rodríguez |
| MF | 27 | (Brazil) Duda Sampaio |
| MF | 7 | (Colombia) Gisela Robledo | | (substituted off) 57' |
| MF | 17 | (Brazil) Victória |
| FW | 19 | (Brazil) Letícia Monteiro | | (substituted off) 57' |
| FW | 10 | (Brazil) Gabi Zanotti (c) |
Substitutes:
| GK | 12 | (Brazil) Letícia |
| GK | 24 | (Brazil) Kemelli |
| DF | 3 | (Brazil) Leticia Teles |
| DF | 4 | (Brazil) Thaís Regina |
| DF | 22 | (Brazil) Juliete | | (substituted on) 57' |
| MF | 23 | (Brazil) Gi Fernandes |
| FW | 9 | (Brazil) Andressa Alves |
| FW | 13 | (Brazil) Ivana Fuso |
| FW | 30 | (Brazil) Jaqueline | | (substituted on) 57' |
| FW | 40 | (Brazil) Jhonson | (yellow card) 88' | (substituted on) 57' |
| FW | 94 | (Brazil) Ariel Godoi |
Manager:
(Brazil) Lucas Piccinato

| GK | 1 | (Colombia) Luisa Agudelo |
| DF | 24 | (Colombia) Jessica Bermeo | | (substituted off) 90+2' |
| DF | 5 | (Colombia) Stefanía Perlaza | (yellow card) 45' |
| DF | 17 | (Colombia) Kelly Caicedo |
| DF | 2 | (Colombia) Angie Salazar |
| MF | 23 | (Colombia) Zharick Montoya | | (substituted off) 90+2' |
| MF | 20 | (Colombia) Paola García (c) |
| MF | 21 | (Colombia) Kelly Ibargüen |
| FW | 19 | (Colombia) Melanin Aponzá |
| FW | 14 | (Colombia) Michelle Vásquez | | (substituted off) 34' |
| FW | 9 | (Colombia) María Marquínez | | (substituted off) 78' |
Substitutes:
| GK | 12 | (Ecuador) Andrea Vera |
| GK | 22 | (Colombia) Paula Montañez |
| DF | 3 | (Colombia) Lina Arboleda |
| DF | 4 | (Colombia) Ana Fisgativa | | (substituted on) 78' |
| MF | 8 | (Colombia) Natalia Hernández | | (substituted on) 90+2' |
| MF | 13 | (Colombia) Valeria Cárdenas |
| FW | 7 | (Colombia) Belkis Niño |
| FW | 11 | (Colombia) Loren Sánchez |
| FW | 15 | (Colombia) Eidy Ruiz | | (substituted on) 90+2' |
| FW | 16 | (Colombia) Sindy Sánchez |
| FW | 30 | (Colombia) Lorena Cobos | | (substituted on) 34' |
Manager:
(Colombia) Jhon Alber Ortiz

Assistant referees:
Gisella Trucco (Argentina)
Carla López (Argentina)
Fourth official:
Dione Rissios (Chile)
Video assistant referee:
Salomé di Iorio (Argentina)
Assistant video assistant referees:
Leslie Vásquez (Chile)

Match rules

- 90 minutes.
- Penalty shoot-out if scores still level.
- Eleven named substitutes.
- Maximum of five substitutions.

== Statistics ==
=== Top goalscorers ===
| Rank | Player | Team | Goals |
|---|---|---|---|
| 1 | (Brazil) Gabi Zanotti | (Brazil) Corinthians | 6 |
| 2 | (Chile) Mary Valencia | (Chile) Colo-Colo | 5 |
| 3 | (Ecuador) Ámbar Torres | (Ecuador) Dragonas IDV | 3 |
| 4 | (Brazil) Ariel Godoi | (Brazil) Corinthians | 2 |
| 4 | (Brazil) Jhonson | (Brazil) Corinthians | 2 |
| 4 | (Brazil) Letícia Monteiro | (Brazil) Corinthians | 2 |
| 4 | (Brazil) Thaís Regina | (Brazil) Corinthians | 2 |
| 4 | (Brazil) Andressa | (Brazil) Ferroviária | 2 |
| 4 | (Colombia) Karla Viancha | (Colombia) Santa Fe | 2 |

=== Final ranking ===
As per statistical convention in football, matches decided in extra time were counted as wins and losses, while matches decided by penalty shoot-out were counted as draws.

| Pos | Team | Pld | W | D | L | GF | GA | GD | Pts | Final result |
|---|---|---|---|---|---|---|---|---|---|---|
| 1st place, gold medalist(s) | (Brazil) Corinthians | 6 | 3 | 3 | 0 | 18 | 2 | +16 | 12 | Champions |
| 2nd place, silver medalist(s) | (Colombia) Deportivo Cali | 6 | 3 | 3 | 0 | 6 | 1 | +5 | 12 | Runners-up |
| 3rd place, bronze medalist(s) | (Brazil) Ferroviária | 6 | 4 | 2 | 0 | 8 | 2 | +6 | 14 | Third place |
| 4 | (Chile) Colo-Colo | 6 | 4 | 1 | 1 | 5 | 1 | +4 | 13 | Fourth place |
| 5 | (Paraguay) Libertad | 4 | 0 | 3 | 1 | 1 | 2 | −1 | 3 (Note: Points in quarter-finals: Libertad 0, São Paulo 0, Dragonas IDV 0, Boca Juniors 0. Goal difference in quarter-finals: Libertad −1, São Paulo −2, Dragonas IDV −3, Boca Juniors –4.) | Eliminated in Quarter-finals |
| 6 | (Brazil) São Paulo | 4 | 2 | 0 | 2 | 3 | 3 | 0 | 6 | Eliminated in Quarter-finals |
| 7 | (Ecuador) Dragonas IDV | 4 | 2 | 1 | 1 | 7 | 4 | +3 | 7 | Eliminated in Quarter-finals |
| 8 | (Argentina) Boca Juniors | 4 | 1 | 2 | 1 | 2 | 4 | −2 | 5 | Eliminated in Quarter-finals |
| 9 | (Colombia) Santa Fe | 3 | 1 | 0 | 2 | 7 | 2 | +5 | 3 | Eliminated in Group stage |
| 10 | (Argentina) San Lorenzo | 3 | 1 | 0 | 2 | 1 | 3 | −2 | 3 | Eliminated in Group stage |
| 11 | (Peru) Alianza Lima | 3 | 0 | 2 | 1 | 2 | 3 | −1 | 2 | Eliminated in Group stage |
| 12 | (Uruguay) Nacional | 3 | 0 | 2 | 1 | 0 | 1 | −1 | 2 | Eliminated in Group stage |
| 13 | Universidad de Chile | 3 | 0 | 2 | 1 | 0 | 2 | −2 | 2 | Eliminated in Group stage |
| 14 | (Venezuela) ADIFFEM | 3 | 0 | 1 | 2 | 1 | 4 | −3 | 1 | Eliminated in Group stage |
| 15 | (Paraguay) Olimpia | 3 | 0 | 0 | 3 | 0 | 4 | −4 | 0 | Eliminated in Group stage |
| 16 | (Bolivia) Always Ready | 3 | 0 | 0 | 3 | 0 | 23 | −23 | 0 | Eliminated in Group stage |

Rules for classification: For 5th to 8th place: 1) Points in quarter-finals; 2) Goal difference in quarter-finals; 3) Goals scored in quarter-finals; 4) Fewest red cards received in quarter-finals; 5) Fewest yellow cards received in quarter-finals; 6) Fewest red cards received in all matches; 7) Fewest yellow cards received in all matches; 8) Drawing of lots (Regulations Article 24).
For 9th to 16th place: 1) Points in group stage; 2) Goal difference; 3) Goals scored; 4) Fewest red cards received; 5) Fewest yellow cards received; 6) Drawing of lots (Regulations Article 25).

== See also ==
- 2024–25 AFC Women's Champions League
- 2025 CAF Women's Champions League
- 2024–25 CONCACAF W Champions Cup
- 2025 OFC Women's Champions League
- 2024–25 UEFA Women's Champions League
