= Club Always Ready (women) =

Bolivian women's football club in La Paz

Always Ready
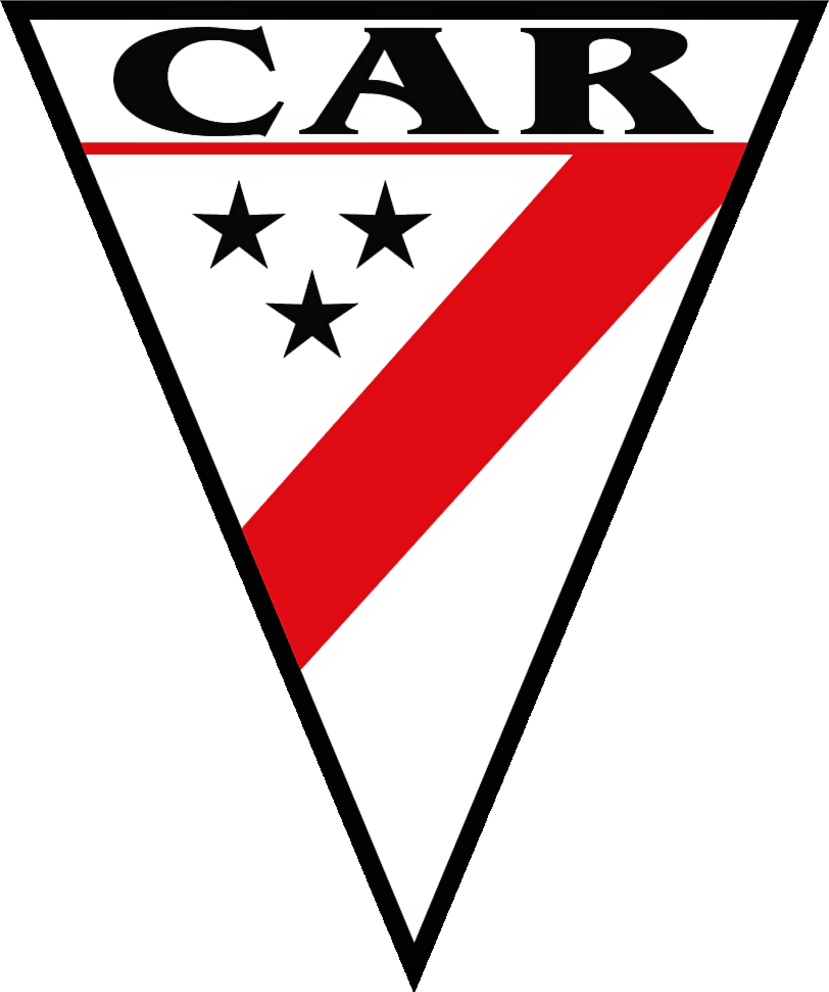
- Full name: Club Deportivo Always Ready
- Nickname(s): Albirrojas; Las Millonarias
- Ground: Estadio Municipal de El Alto
- Capacity: 25,000
- Chairman: Andrés Costa
- League: Campeonato Boliviano
- 2025: Campeonato Boliviano, 1st
- Website: www.alwaysready.bo
Home colours	Away colours

Club Deportivo Always Ready is the women's football section of the football club of the same name, which is based in La Paz and plays its home games in nearby El Alto. They play in the Bolivian women's football championship and have won three league titles.

== History ==
In 2022, Always Ready won their first league title. They went on to defend their title in the next two seasons.

== Stadium ==
Always Ready does not have its own stadium, so its home matches are played at the Estadio Municipal de El Alto, known as Municipal de Villa Ingenio, located in the neighborhood of the same name in the northern part of El Alto, which has a capacity of twenty-five thousand spectators. The stadium is owned by the Municipal Government of El Alto and was inaugurated on 16 July 2017.

Located at an altitude of 4,090 meters above sea level, it is the highest stadium in the country, surpassing Estadio Hernando Siles in La Paz, Estadio Jesús Bermúdez in Oruro, and Estadio Víctor Agustín Ugarte in Potosí.

== Honours ==
- Campeonato Boliviano: 2022, 2023, 2024, 2025
- Campeonato Paceño de Fútbol (3): 2022, 2023-A, 2023-C
