= Mariza (footballer) =

Brazilian professional footballer (born 2001)

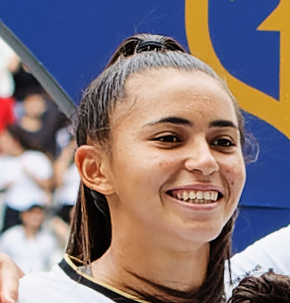
- Mariza in 2023

Personal information
- Full name: Mariza Nascimento Silva
- Date of birth: 8 November 2001 (age 25)
- Place of birth: Imperatriz, Brazil
- Height: 1.63 m (5 ft 4 in)
- Positions: Centre-back; midfielder

Team information
- Current team: UANL
- Number: 20

Youth career
- 2012–2016: JV Lideral
- 2017: São José
- 2018: Chapecoense

Senior career*
Years	Team	Apps	(Gls)
2016	JV Lideral	0	(0)
2018–2019	Chapecoense	7	(1)
2019–2021	Grêmio	22	(2)
2022–2025	Corinthians	140	(9)
2026–	UANL	18	(0)

International career
2018	Brazil U17		
2020	Brazil U20	1	(0)
2024–	Brazil	13	(1)
Medal record
Women's football
Representing Brazil
Copa América Femenina
Gold medal – first place	2025 Ecuador
- * Club domestic league appearances and goals as of 14:06, 2 December 2024 (UTC)

Mariza Nascimento Silva (born 8 November 2001), simply known as Mariza, is a Brazilian professional footballer who plays as a centre-back or defensive midfielder for Liga MX Femenil club Tigres UANL and the Brazil national team.

== Club career ==
Born in Imperatriz, Maranhão, Mariza began her career with the youth sides of local JV Lideral, before making his first team debut at the age of 15 in the 2016 Campeonato Maranhense de Futebol Feminino. In the following year, she moved to São José and returned to youth setup.

In 2018, Mariza signed for Chapecoense; initially a member of the under-18 team, she later started featuring with the main squad. On 29 August 2019, she agreed to a contract with Grêmio.

On 28 December 2020, Mariza agreed to a new one-year deal with Grêmio. On 6 January 2022, she moved to Corinthians.

In January 2026, Mariza signed for Mexican club Tigres UANL.

== International career ==
Mariza represented Brazil at under-17 and under-20 levels, before receiving her first call-up to the full side on 2 July 2024, for a training camp before the 2024 Summer Olympics.

== Honours ==
Corinthians

- Supercopa do Brasil de Futebol Feminino: 2022, 2023, 2024
- Campeonato Brasileiro de Futebol Feminino Série A1: 2022, 2023, 2024
- Copa Libertadores Femenina: 2023, 2024, 2025
- Copa Paulista de Futebol Feminino: 2022, 2023
- Campeonato Paulista de Futebol Feminino: 2023

UANL

- Liga MX Femenil: Apertura 2025

Brazil

- Copa América Femenina: 2025

Individual

- Paulistão Feminino Team of the Year: 2023, 2024, 2025
- Bola de Prata: 2025
- Campeonato Brasileiro Série A1 Team of the Year: 2025
