= Pati Maldaner =

Brazilian footballer (born 2003)

Personal information
- Full name: Patrícia Dewes Maldaner
- Date of birth: 8 February 2003 (age 23)
- Place of birth: Pinhalzino, Santa Catarina, Brazil
- Position: Defender

Team information
- Current team: Palmeiras
- Number: 13

Youth career
- 2018–2020: Chapecoense’s

Senior career*
Years	Team	Apps	(Gls)
2020–2023	Grêmio		
2024–	Palmeiras		

International career
2022	Brazil U20		
- * Club domestic league appearances and goals

Patrícia Dewes Maldaner (born 8 February 2003), better known as Pati Maldaner, is a Brazilian professional footballer who plays as a defender for Palmeiras.

== Early life and youth career ==
Maldaner was born in Pinhalzinho, Santa Catarina. She began playing football in 2018 with Chapecoense's youth teams, where she developed technical skills through futsal. In 2019, at the age of 16, she caught the attention of scouts of Grêmio.

== Club career ==
=== Grêmio ===
Maldaner joined Grêmio in 2020 and played for four seasons in Brazil’s top-tier women's football competition. She was honored by the club after reaching 50 appearances.

In November 2022, she helped Grêmio secure the Campeonato Gaúcho Feminino title with a victory over Internacional.

She renewed her contract with Grêmio until the end of 2023.

In 2022, Maldaner was part of the Brazil U-20 squad that won the bronze medal at the FIFA U-20 Women's World Cup.

=== Palmeiras ===
In January 2024, Maldaner signed with Palmeiras, describing it as an important step in her career.

She participated in The Women's Cup in Louisville, United States, where she emphasized the value of playing against international teams.

Maldaner was part of the Palmeiras squad that won the 2024 Campeonato Paulista Feminino, breaking Corinthians' dominance in the competition. The title was decided on penalties after a 2–2 aggregate draw.

== International career ==
Maldaner represented Brazil at the 2022 South American U-20 Championship.

She was selected for the 2022 FIFA U-20 Women's World Cup squad.

== Personal life ==
Maldaner is pursuing a degree in nutrition.

== Honours ==
Grêmio

- Campeonato Gaúcho Feminino: 2022

Palmeiras

- Campeonato Paulista de Futebol Feminino: 2024, 2025
- Copa do Brasil de Futebol Feminino: 2025
- Brasil Ladies Cup: 2025
- Supercopa do Brasil de Futebol Feminino: 2026

Brazil

- South American U-20 Championship: 2022
