= Estadio Florencio Sola =

Football stadium in Banfield, Argentina

Florencio Sola Stadium
- Estadio Florencio Sola
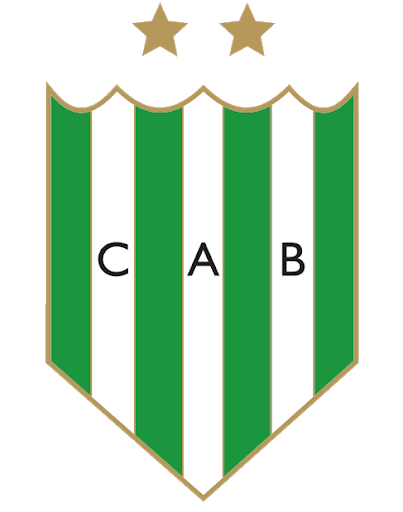

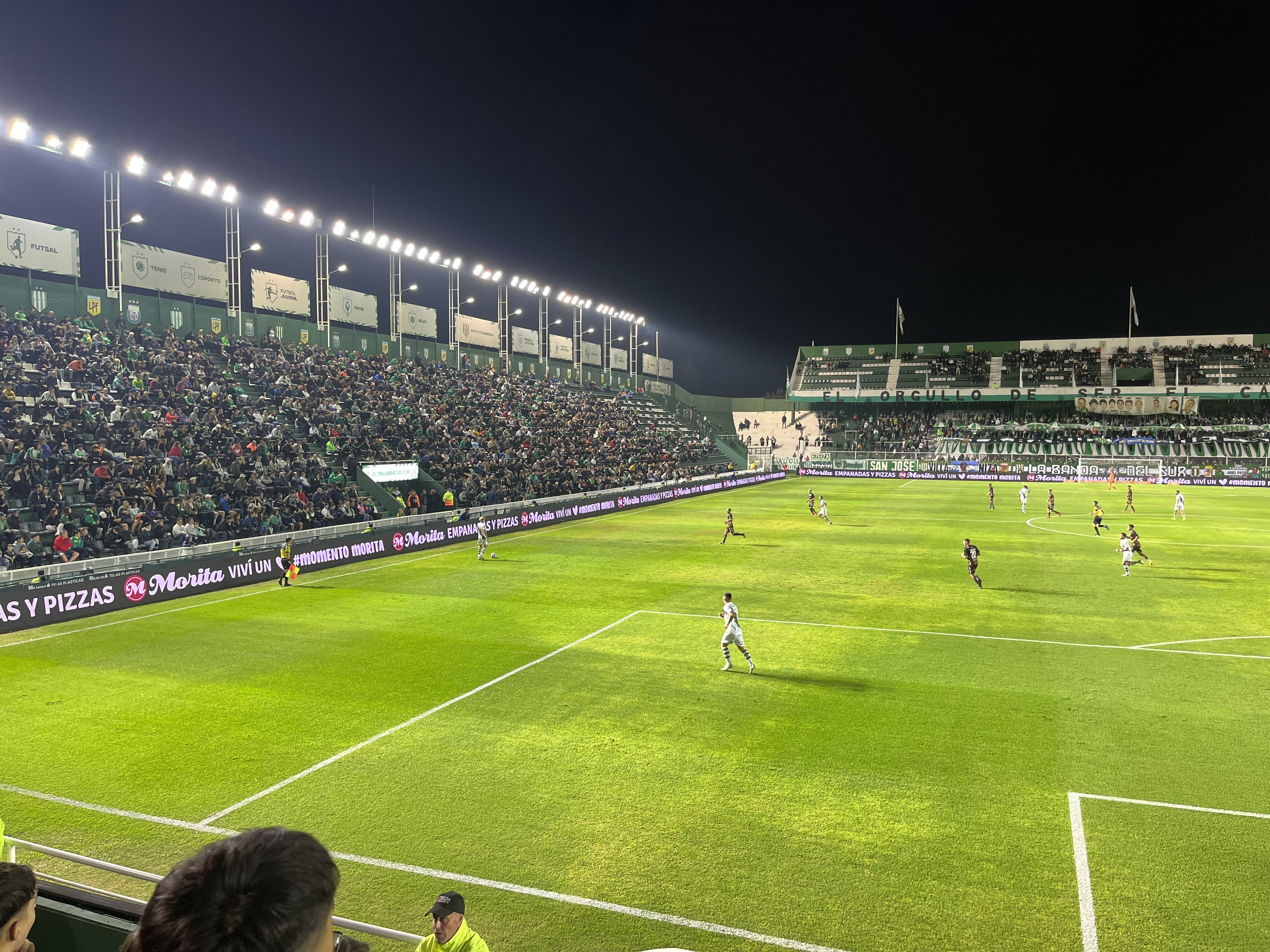
- The stadium during a match in 2023
- Interactive map of Florencio Sola Stadium
- Address: Gral. Arenales 900; Argentina
- Location: Banfield
- Coordinates: 34°45′03″S 58°23′15″W
- Owner: Banfield
- Capacity: 34,900; 33,000 (international)
- Surface: Grass
- Scoreboard: 9 m × 5 m (30 ft × 16 ft) LED display
- Field size: 102 m × 66 m (335 ft × 217 ft)

Construction
- Opened: October 6, 1940; 85 years ago
- Renovated: 2006

Florencio Sola Stadium (Spanish: Estadio Florencio Sola) is a stadium in Banfield, Buenos Aires. It is located on 900 Arenales Street, in the heart of the city of the city and surrounded by a neighborhood characterized by cobblestone streets, chalets with tile roofs and a lush grove that is always highlighted by those who visit the stadium.

Owned and operated by Club Atlético Banfield, the stadium was inaugurated in 1940 in a friendly match v Independiente. It is named after Florencio Lencho Sola (1908–?), president of Banfield in two periods (1938–44, 1947–54).

It is the stadium where the football team forged a record of 49 unbeaten matches between 1950 and 1953. The stadium was considered ahead of its time, as it was the first club out of the called big five to have cement bleachers, including, before some of the big teams. It has a current capacity of 34,900 spectators.

CA Banfield drew an average home attendance of 21,777 in the 2024 Argentine Primera División.

== History ==
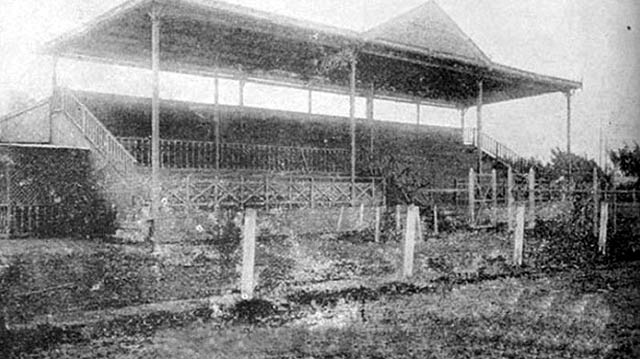
The grandstand at the predecessor to Florencio Sola Stadium

The first Banfield stadium was a vacant land located on the west side of the neighborhood, near the railway station. The land (given by the Compañia Primitiva de Gas and acquired by the club in 1920) was surrounded by Gallo, Arenales, Peña, Granaderos and Lugano streets. On May 9, 1929, a wooden grandstand and the lockers below it were destroyed by fire. A new roofed grandstand was built and inaugurated one year later.

After several years of work and financial investments, in 1940 Banfield inaugurated its new stadium with a friendly match v Independiente, reigning champions of 1939 which beat Banfield 1–0 with a goal scored by Arsenio Erico. It was considered one of the most modern stadius in Argentina so all its grandstands were concrete made. In fact, the stadium was the fourth to be built entirely of cement after Atlético Tucumán (1922), Independiente (1928), and River Plate (1938) stadiums.

In that stadium, Banfield achieved a record of 49 matches without defeats, from May 1950 to June 1953. In that period of time, the team scored 114. goals.

In 2006 the reconstruction of the stalls sector was carried out. It has boxes, four changing rooms for the teams, two pre-warming gyms, two for the referees, an anti-doping room, two elevators, a confectionery, 24 booths for journalism, and an unbeatable view, as well as administrative offices. It also has parking, boxes, shopping center, private shield and balcony in front, individual entrance for the local and visiting team buses. Surveillance cameras at all entrances to the stadium and in the stands and stalls.

In 2011, the stadium hosted two concerts. Spanish artist Joaquín Sabina performed in April, followed by fellow countryman Joan Manuel Serrat in October. Both concerts were part of the celebrations for the 150th. anniversary of the city of Banfield and organised by the Municipality of Lomas de Zamora Partido. The concert had an attendance of about 30,000.

In 2018, new seats were added, apart from 24 new boxes for media coverage. Moreover, in 2019 the fencing of the side stand was removed, putting seats for 2,500 spectators.
