= Dayana Rodríguez =

Venezuelan footballer (born 2001)

Personal information
- Full name: Dayana Lisset Rodríguez León
- Date of birth: 20 October 2001 (age 25)
- Place of birth: Calabozo - Estado Guárico, Venezuela
- Height: 1.55 m (5 ft 1 in)
- Position: Midfielder

Team information
- Current team: Corinthians

Senior career*
Years	Team	Apps	(Gls)
–2018	Estudiantes de Guárico		
2019	3B da Amazônia		
2019	Estudiantes de Caracas		
2022–2023	Atlético Mineiro	28	(2)
2024	Grêmio	17	(3)
2025–	Corinthians	0	(0)

International career^{‡}
2016–2018	Venezuela U17	8	(0)
2018–	Venezuela	14	(0)
- * Club domestic league appearances and goals as of 14 May 2022 ‡ National team caps and goals as of 30 July 2018

Dayana Lisset Rodríguez León (born 20 October 2001) is a Venezuelan professional footballer who plays as a midfielder for Brazilian Série A1 side Corinthians and the Venezuela women's national team.

== International career ==
Rodríguez represented Venezuela at the 2016 South American U-17 Women's Championship and the 2016 FIFA U-17 Women's World Cup. At senior level, she played the 2018 Central American and Caribbean Games.
