= Letícia Monteiro =

Brazilian professional footballer (born 2002)

Personal information
- Full name: Letícia Gabrielle Silva Monteiro
- Date of birth: 13 July 2002 (age 24)
- Place of birth: Juazeiro, Brazil
- Height: 1.60 m (5 ft 3 in)
- Positions: Attacking midfielder; forward

Team information
- Current team: Corinthians
- Number: 19

Youth career
- 2016–2018: VF4
- 2021: Fortaleza

Senior career*
Years	Team	Apps	(Gls)
2018	Kashima	0	(0)
2018	Mixto-PB	0	(0)
2019	UDA	3	(0)
2020	Botafogo-PB	0	(0)
2020	Auto Esporte	5	(5)
2021	Fortaleza	7	(1)
2022–2023	Red Bull Bragantino	19	(6)
2023	→ Internacional (loan)	0	(0)
2024	Internacional	17	(6)
2025–	Corinthians	4	(4)

International career^{‡}
2022	Brazil U20	2	(0)
- * Club domestic league appearances and goals as of 20:40, 14 May 2025 (UTC) ‡ National team caps and goals as of 20:40, 14 May 2025 (UTC)

Letícia Gabrielle Silva Monteiro (born 13 July 2002) is a Brazilian professional footballer who plays as either an attacking midfielder or a forward for Corinthians.

== Club career ==
Born in Juazeiro, Bahia, Monteiro was spotted by VF4 (a club from Paraíba) at the age of 16, initially to play futsal. She would feature for other clubs in the state, such as Kashima, Mixto-PB, Botafogo-PB and Auto Esporte, aside from a spell at UDA in 2019.

In 2021, Monteiro joined Fortaleza initially for the under-18 team. On 26 January 2022, she moved to Red Bull Bragantino on a one-year contract.

On 28 August 2023, Monteiro was announced at Internacional on loan. On 25 November, after helping the club to win the year's Campeonato Gaúcho, she signed a permanent deal with them.

On 7 January 2025, Corinthians announced the signing of Monteiro on a three-year deal.

== International career ==
After representing Brazil at under-20 level in the 2022 South American Under-20 Women's Football Championship, Monteiro was called up to the full side for a period of trainings in July 2024.

== Honours ==
Fortaleza

- Campeonato Cearense de Futebol Feminino: 2020

Bragantino

- Campeonato Brasileiro de Futebol Feminino Série A2: 2023

Internacional

- Campeonato Gaúcho de Futebol Feminino: 2023

Brazil U20

- South American Under-20 Women's Football Championship: 2022

Individual

- Bola de Prata Breakthrough Player: 2024
