= Thaís (footballer, born 1996) =

Brazilian footballer (born 1996)

Personal information
- Full name: Thaís Cristina da Silva Ferreira
- Date of birth: 1 May 1996 (age 30)
- Place of birth: Campinas, São Paulo, Brazil
- Height: 1.65 m (5 ft 5 in)
- Position: Centre back

Team information
- Current team: Corinthians

Senior career*
Years	Team	Apps	(Gls)
2016	Valinhos		
2016	Guarani		
2017–2018	Ponte Preta	28	(2)
2018	Osasco Audax	0	(0)
2019–2023	Palmeiras	55	(7)
2023–2025	UD Tenerife	25	(0)
2025–	Corinthians	0	(0)

International career^{‡}
2021–	Brazil	5	(0)
Medal record
Women's football
Representing Brazil
Olympic Games
Silver medal – second place	2024 Paris
- * Club domestic league appearances and goals as of 5 December 2023 ‡ National team caps and goals as of 24 November 2022.

Thaís Cristina da Silva Ferreira (born 1 May 1996), simply known as Thaís, is a Brazilian professional footballer who plays as a centre back for Corinthians and the Brazil women's national football team.

== Club career ==
Thaís has played for Valinhos FC, Guarani FC, AA Ponte Preta, Grêmio Osasco Audax EC and Palmeiras in Brazil.

In May 2023, Thaís joined Spanish Liga F club UD Granadilla Tenerife.

On 22 February 2025, Thaís was announced at Corinthians.

== International career ==
Thaís made her senior debut for Brazil on 17 September 2021 as a 63rd minute substitution in a 3–1 friendly home win over Argentina.

On 1 February 2024, Thaís was called up to the Brazil squad for the 2024 CONCACAF W Gold Cup.

On 2 July 2024, Thaís was called up to the Brazil squad for the 2024 Summer Olympics.

== Honours ==
Brazil

- Summer Olympics silver medal: 2024
