= Thaís Regina =

Brazilian footballer

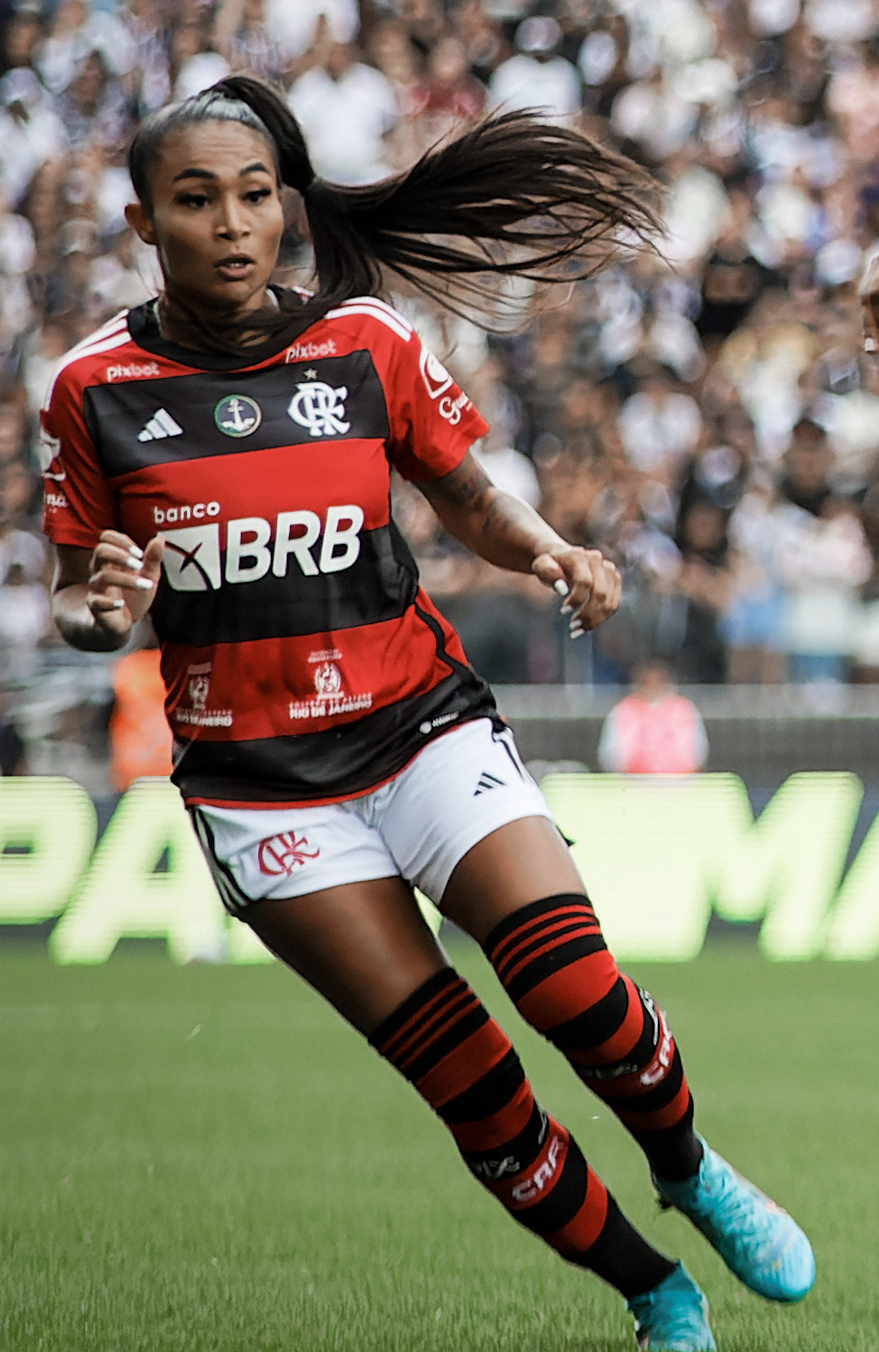

Personal information
- Full name: Thaís Regina da Silva
- Date of birth: 27 March 1999 (age 27)
- Place of birth: Recife, Brazil
- Height: 1.63 m (5 ft 4 in)
- Position: Centre back

Team information
- Current team: Corinthians
- Number: 4

Senior career*
Years	Team	Apps	(Gls)
2014	Sport Recife	4	(0)
2015	Vitória das Tabocas	4	(0)
2015	Coríntians	4	(0)
2016	Vitória das Tabocas	3	(1)
2017	Iranduba	1	(0)
2017	3B da Amazônia	0	(0)
2018	Sport Recife	9	(0)
2019–2022	São Paulo	107	(10)
2023–2024	Flamengo	49	(1)
2025–	Corinthians	4	(0)

International career^{‡}
2016	Brazil U17	3	(0)
2018	Brazil U20	6	(0)
2022–	Brazil	1	(0)
- * Club domestic league appearances and goals as of 22:37, 28 April 2024 (UTC) ‡ National team caps and goals as of 19:52, 26 January 2023 (UTC)

Thaís Regina da Silva (born 27 March 1999), known as Thaís Regina or just Thaís, is a Brazilian professional footballer who plays as a central defender for Corinthians and the Brazil women's national team.

== Club career ==
=== First spell at Sport Recife ===
Thaís was born in Recife, Pernambuco, and made her senior debut with hometown side Sport Recife in 2014. She made her league debut against Bahia on 18 September 2014.

=== Vitória das Tabocas ===
She subsequently played for Vitória das Tabocas and Coríntians. She made her league debut for Vitória das Tabocas against Viana on 9 September 2015.

=== Iranduba ===
Thaís Regina signed for Iranduba on 30 December 2016. She made her league debut against São Francisco on 24 May 2017.

=== Second spell at Sport Recife ===
Thaís also played for 3B da Amazônia in 2017, before returning to Sport in 2018. She made her league debut against São José on 25 April 2018.

=== São Paulo ===
Ahead of the 2019 season, she joined São Paulo, where she became a defensive mainstay and renewed her contract for the 2020 season. Thaís also renewed her contract for the 2021 season.

=== Flamengo ===
On 23 December 2022, Thaís moved to Flamengo. She made her league debut against Santos on 25 February 2023.

== International career ==
Thaís made her U17 debut against Nigeria U17s on 1 October 2016.

Thaís made her U20 debut against United States U20s on 11 December 2017.

After representing Brazil at under-17 and under-20 level, Thaís received her first call-up for the full side in February 2022. She made her international debut against Hungary on 11 April 2022.

== Personal life ==
Regina is married to 19 year old Santos midfielder Kenay Martins.
