= 2020 Copa Libertadores Femenina =

Copa CONMEBOL Libertadores Femenina Argentina 2020

Tournament details
- Host country: Argentina
- Dates: 5–21 March 2021
- Teams: 16 (from 10 associations)
- Venues: 2 (in 2 host cities)

Final positions
- Champions: (Brazil) Ferroviária (2nd title)
- Runners-up: (Colombia) América
- Third place: (Brazil) Corinthians
- Fourth place: Universidad de Chile

Tournament statistics
- Matches played: 32
- Goals scored: 124 (3.88 per match)
- Top scorer(s): (Brazil) Gabi Nunes (Brazil) Grazi (Brazil) Victória (7 goals each)

The 2020 Copa CONMEBOL Libertadores Femenina was the 12th edition of the CONMEBOL Libertadores Femenina (also referred to as the Copa Libertadores Femenina), South America's premier women's club football tournament organized by CONMEBOL. The competition was played between 5 and 21 March 2021.

The tournament was originally to be held in Chile between 25 September and 11 October 2020. However, it was postponed by CONMEBOL on 19 June 2020 due to the COVID-19 pandemic, provisionally to early 2021. CONMEBOL announced on 20 November 2020 that the 2020 edition would be held in Argentina from 5 to 21 March 2021. Corinthians, the defending champions, were eliminated in the semi-finals.

Ferroviária (Brazil) defeated América (Colombia) 2–1 to win their second title.

== Format ==
For the group stage, the 16 teams were drawn into four groups. Teams in each group played one another in a round-robin basis, with the top two teams of each group advancing to the quarter-finals. Starting from the quarter-finals, the teams played a single-elimination tournament.

== Teams ==
The competition was contested by 16 teams:

- the champions of all ten CONMEBOL associations
- the title holders
- an additional team from the host association
- four additional teams from associations with the best historical performance in the tournament (associations in **bold** receive two berths according to the points total until the 2019 edition).
  1. Brazil: 200 points
  2. Chile: 127 points
  3. Colombia: 105 points
  4. Paraguay: 101 points
  5. Argentina: 82 points
  6. Venezuela: 76 points
  7. Ecuador: 59 points
  8. Uruguay: 42 points
  9. Bolivia: 37 points
  10. Peru: 28 points

Originally teams had to apply for a licence to compete in the tournament, but this requirement had been suspended due to the exceptional nature of the situation generated by the COVID-19 pandemic.

Association	Team	Qualifying method	Participation	Previous best result
Argentina (hosts)	Boca Juniors	2019–20 Campeonato de Fútbol Femenino Primera División A first stage winners (Note: Due to the COVID-19 pandemic in Argentina, the competition was initially suspended and later concluded by AFA on 28 April 2020. The berth was awarded to Boca Juniors, who won the Campeonato first stage.)	6th	Third place (2010)
Argentina (hosts)	River Plate	2020 Torneo Transición runners-up (Host association additional entry)	2nd	Third place (2017)
Bolivia	Deportivo Trópico	2020–21 Copa Simón Bolívar Femenina champions	1st	—
Brazil	Corinthians	2019 Copa Libertadores Femenina champions	3rd (Note: Corinthians won the 2017 title as a partnership with Audax. They created their own team for the 2018 season.)	**Champions** (2017, 2019)
Brazil	Ferroviária	2019 Campeonato Brasileiro Feminino A1 champions	4th	**Champions** (2015)
Brazil	Kindermann/Avaí	2019 Campeonato Brasileiro Feminino A1 third place	1st	—
Chile	Santiago Morning	2019 Campeonato Femenino Primera champions (Note: Due to the Chilean protests in 2019, the competition was initially suspended and later concluded by ANFP on 29 November 2019. Santiago Morning, who were leading the competition at the time of the suspension qualified for the Chile 1 berth. On 7 December 2019, Santiago Morning were declared champions of the Campeonato Femenino by ANFP.)	2nd	Quarter-finals (2019)
Chile	Universidad de Chile	2020 Copa Libertadores Femenina qualifying play-off winners (Note: The qualifying play-off was played on 5 February 2021 at Estadio Santa Laura between Colo-Colo (2019 Campeonato Femenino Primera runners-up) and Universidad de Chile (2020 Campeonato Femenino de Transición runners-up).)	1st	—
Colombia	Santa Fe	2020 Liga Femenina champions	2nd	Group stage (2017)
Colombia	América de Cali	2020 Liga Femenina runners-up	2nd	Third place (2019)
Ecuador	El Nacional	2020 SúperLiga Femenina champions	1st	—
Paraguay	Libertad/Limpeño	2019 Torneo Femenino champions	4th (Note: Sportivo Limpeño won the 2016 title. In 2018 they started a partnership with Libertad (2nd participation).)	**Champions** (2016)
Paraguay	Sol de América	2019 Torneo Femenino runners-up	1st	—
Peru	Universitario	2019 Copa Perú Femenina champions	4th	Group stage (2015, 2016, 2017)
Uruguay	Peñarol	2019 Campeonato Uruguayo Femenino Primera División champions	3rd	Group stage (2018, 2019)
Venezuela	Atlético SC	2021 Torneo Invitacional Femenino champions	1st	—

== Venues ==
Stadia locations

The matches were played in the José Amalfitani Stadium in Buenos Aires and the Estadio Nuevo Francisco Urbano in Morón.

== Match officials ==
CONMEBOL released the list of match officials on 17 February 2021. Few days before the beginning of the tournament, the Uruguayan referee Claudia Umpiérrez was replaced by Anahí Fernández.

== Draw ==
The draw for the tournament was held on 23 February 2021, 12:00 PYST (UTC−3), at the CONMEBOL Convention Centre in Luque, Paraguay. The 16 teams were drawn into four groups of four containing a team from each of the four pots. The defending champions Corinthians and the host country champions Boca Juniors were automatically seeded into Pot 1 and allocated to positions A1 and B1, respectively, in the group stage. The host country additional team River Plate were automatically seeded into Pot 3, while the four additional teams from associations with the best historical performance were automatically seeded into Pot 4. The remaining teams were seeded based on the results of their association in the 2019 Copa Libertadores Femenina. Teams from the same association could not be drawn into the same group.

Pot 1	Pot 2	Pot 3	Pot 4
(Brazil) Corinthians (Position A1); (Argentina) Boca Juniors (Position B1); (Brazil) Ferroviária; (Colombia) Santa Fe	(Paraguay) Libertad/Limpeño; (Ecuador) El Nacional; (Chile) Santiago Morning; (Venezuela) Atlético SC	(Uruguay) Peñarol; (Bolivia) Deportivo Trópico; (Peru) Universitario; (Argentina) River Plate	(Brazil) Kindermann/Avaí; Universidad de Chile; (Colombia) América de Cali; (Paraguay) Sol de América

== Group stage ==
In the group stage, the teams were ranked according to points (3 points for a win, 1 point for a draw, 0 points for a loss). If tied on points, tiebreakers would be applied in the following order (Regulations Article 21).

1. Goal difference;
2. Goals scored;
3. Head-to-head result in games between tied teams;
4. Number of red cards;
5. Number of yellow cards;
6. Drawing of lots.

The winners and runners-up of each group advanced to the quarter-finals.

All times are local, ART (UTC−3).

=== Group A ===
Pos	Team	Pld	W	D	L	GF	GA	GD	Pts	Qualification
1	(Brazil) Corinthians	3	3	0	0	27	0	+27	9	Quarter-finals
2	(Colombia) América de Cali	3	2	0	1	10	4	+6	6	Quarter-finals
3	(Peru) Universitario	3	0	1	2	1	14	−13	1	
4	(Ecuador) El Nacional	3	0	1	2	2	22	−20	1	

Source: CONMEBOL
5 March 2021
17:00

Corinthians (Brazil)	16–0	(Ecuador) El Nacional
Victória 4', 51', 85'; Giovanna Crivelari 10', 19'; Pardal 14'; Tamires 59'; Poliana 61'; Gabi Zanotti 63'; Gabi Nunes 70', 74', 79'; Adriana 80'; Grazi 83', 84', 90'	Report

Estadio Nuevo Francisco Urbano, Morón
Referee: María Belén Carvajal (Chile)
5 March 2021
19:30

Universitario (Peru)	0–5	(Colombia) América de Cali
	Report	González 8', 33', 51'; Arias 15'; Guarecuco 75'

Estadio Nuevo Francisco Urbano, Morón
Referee: Adriana Farfán (Bolivia)

8 March 2021
17:00

Corinthians (Brazil)	8–0	(Peru) Universitario
Grazi 2', 38', 90+1'; Gabi Nunes 12', 57'; Giovanna Crivelari 42'; Andressinha 54'; Diany 87'	Report

Estadio Nuevo Francisco Urbano, Morón
Referee: Anahí Fernández (Uruguay)
8 March 2021
19:30

El Nacional (Ecuador)	1–5	(Colombia) América de Cali
González 4' (o.g.)	Report	Iglesias 20'; Ospina 27'; Rodríguez 74', 90+1'; Usme 84' (pen.)

Estadio Nuevo Francisco Urbano, Morón
Referee: Roberta Echeverría (Argentina)

11 March 2021
17:00

América de Cali (Colombia)	0–3	(Brazil) Corinthians
	Report	Giovanna Crivelari 51'; Adriana 71' (pen.); Giovanna Campiolo 82'

Estadio Nuevo Francisco Urbano, Morón
Referee: Adriana Farfán (Bolivia)
11 March 2021
17:00

El Nacional (Ecuador)	1–1	(Peru) Universitario
Villa 73'	Report	Canales 90'

José Amalfitani Stadium, Buenos Aires
Referee: María Victoria Daza (Colombia)

=== Group B ===
Pos	Team	Pld	W	D	L	GF	GA	GD	Pts	Qualification
1	(Argentina) Boca Juniors (H)	3	2	1	0	12	2	+10	7	Quarter-finals
2	(Chile) Santiago Morning	3	1	2	0	10	1	+9	5	Quarter-finals
3	(Brazil) Kindermann/Avaí	3	1	1	1	8	1	+7	4	
4	(Bolivia) Deportivo Trópico	3	0	0	3	1	27	−26	0	

Source: CONMEBOL
(H) Hosts
5 March 2021
17:00

Deportivo Trópico (Bolivia)	0–8	(Brazil) Kindermann/Avaí
	Report	Lelê 7', 28', 39', 90+3'; Camila 31'; Laryh 34', 76'; Vilma 86'

José Amalfitani Stadium, Buenos Aires
Referee: Anahí Fernández (Uruguay)
5 March 2021
19:30

Boca Juniors (Argentina)	1–1	(Chile) Santiago Morning
Quiñones 57'	Report	Galaz 82'

José Amalfitani Stadium, Buenos Aires
Referee: Emikar Calderas (Venezuela)

8 March 2021
17:00

Santiago Morning (Chile)	0–0	(Brazil) Kindermann/Avaí
	Report

José Amalfitani Stadium, Buenos Aires
Referee: María Victoria Daza (Colombia)
8 March 2021
19:30

Boca Juniors (Argentina)	10–1	(Bolivia) Deportivo Trópico
Troncoso 11'; Y. Rodríguez 20', 41', 57'; Huber 25'; Vallejos 28', 29', 80'; Palomar 62'; Ojeda 67'	Report	Mejía 56'

José Amalfitani Stadium, Buenos Aires
Referee: Helena Cantero (Paraguay)

11 March 2021
19:30

Kindermann/Avaí (Brazil)	0–1	(Argentina) Boca Juniors
	Report	Y. Rodríguez 84'

José Amalfitani Stadium, Buenos Aires
Referee: Elizabeth Tintaya (Peru)
11 March 2021
19:30

Santiago Morning (Chile)	9–0	(Bolivia) Deportivo Trópico
Hix 12'; Villamizar 14', 28'; Araya 31'; Pardo 35'; Fajre 37', 45'; Soruco 47', 72'	Report

Estadio Nuevo Francisco Urbano, Morón
Referee: Emikar Calderas (Venezuela)

=== Group C ===
Pos	Team	Pld	W	D	L	GF	GA	GD	Pts	Qualification
1	(Argentina) River Plate (H)	3	2	1	0	4	0	+4	7	Quarter-finals
2	(Colombia) Santa Fe	3	2	0	1	5	1	+4	6	Quarter-finals
3	(Paraguay) Sol de América	3	1	1	1	2	2	0	4	
4	(Venezuela) Atlético SC	3	0	0	3	1	9	−8	0	

Source: CONMEBOL
(H) Hosts
6 March 2021
17:00

Santa Fe (Colombia)	4–0	(Venezuela) Atlético SC
Ariza 66'; Gauto 68'; Páez 72'; Morales 85'	Report

Estadio Nuevo Francisco Urbano, Morón
Referee: Charly Deretti (Brazil)
6 March 2021
19:30

River Plate (Argentina)	0–0	(Paraguay) Sol de América
	Report

Estadio Nuevo Francisco Urbano, Morón
Referee: Elizabeth Tintaya (Peru)

9 March 2021
17:00

Atlético SC (Venezuela)	1–2	(Paraguay) Sol de América
Bandrés 72'	Report	Lema 5', 90+2'

Estadio Nuevo Francisco Urbano, Morón
Referee: Adriana Farfán (Bolivia)
9 March 2021
19:30

Santa Fe (Colombia)	0–1	(Argentina) River Plate
	Report	Birizamberri 72'

Estadio Nuevo Francisco Urbano, Morón
Referee: María Belén Carvajal (Chile)

12 March 2021
19:30

Sol de América (Paraguay)	0–1	(Colombia) Santa Fe
	Report	Celis 87'

José Amalfitani Stadium, Buenos Aires
Referee: Charly Deretti (Brazil)
12 March 2021
19:30

Atlético SC (Venezuela)	0–3	(Argentina) River Plate
	Report	Costa 1'; Del Trecco 43'; Martelli 82'

Estadio Nuevo Francisco Urbano, Morón
Referee: Anahí Fernández (Uruguay)

=== Group D ===
Pos	Team	Pld	W	D	L	GF	GA	GD	Pts	Qualification
1	Universidad de Chile	3	2	0	1	7	4	+3	6	Quarter-finals
2	(Brazil) Ferroviária	3	1	1	1	5	6	−1	4	Quarter-finals
3	(Paraguay) Libertad/Limpeño	3	1	1	1	4	5	−1	4	
4	(Uruguay) Peñarol	3	0	2	1	1	2	−1	2	

Source: CONMEBOL
6 March 2021
17:00

Ferroviária (Brazil)	0–4	(Paraguay) Libertad/Limpeño
	Report	Peña 8', 40'; C. Benítez 19'; Sandoval 68'

José Amalfitani Stadium, Buenos Aires
Referee: Laura Fortunato (Argentina)
6 March 2021
19:30

Peñarol (Uruguay)	0–1	Universidad de Chile
	Report	Oviedo 89'

José Amalfitani Stadium, Buenos Aires
Referee: María Victoria Daza (Colombia)

9 March 2021
17:00

Ferroviária (Brazil)	1–1	(Uruguay) Peñarol
Monalisa 74'	Report	Aquino 58'

José Amalfitani Stadium, Buenos Aires
Referee: Emikar Calderas (Venezuela)
9 March 2021
19:30

Libertad/Limpeño (Paraguay)	0–5	Universidad de Chile
	Report	Zamora 19', 41' (pen.), 44'; Oviedo 55'; Fernández 70'

José Amalfitani Stadium, Buenos Aires
Referee: Elizabeth Tintaya (Peru)

12 March 2021
17:00

Universidad de Chile	1–4	(Brazil) Ferroviária
Oviedo 42'	Report	Ana Alice 41', 56'; Nicoly 62'; Rafa Mineira 88'

José Amalfitani Stadium, Buenos Aires
Referee: Salomé di Iorio (Argentina)
12 March 2021
17:00

Libertad/Limpeño (Paraguay)	0–0	(Uruguay) Peñarol
	Report

Estadio Nuevo Francisco Urbano, Morón
Referee: Laura Fortunato (Argentina)

== Final stages ==
Starting from the quarter-finals, the teams played a single-elimination tournament. If tied after full time, extra time would not be played, and the penalty shoot-out would be used to determine the winners (Regulations Article 23).

=== Bracket ===
Quarter-finals
14 March – Buenos Aires
(Brazil) Corinthians	7
(Chile) Santiago Morning	0
14 March – Buenos Aires
(Argentina) Boca Juniors	1
(Colombia) América	2
15 March – Morón
(Argentina) River Plate	0
(Brazil) Ferroviária	1
15 March – Morón
Universidad de Chile	3
(Colombia) Santa Fe	1

Semi-finals
17 March – Morón
(Brazil) Corinthians	1 (3)
(Colombia) América (p)	1 (4)
18 March – Morón
(Brazil) Ferroviária (p)	0 (7)
Universidad de Chile	0 (6)

Final
21 March – Buenos Aires
(Colombia) América	1
(Brazil) Ferroviária	2
Third place
21 March – Buenos Aires
(Brazil) Corinthians	4
Universidad de Chile	0

=== Quarter-finals ===
14 March 2021
17:00

Corinthians (Brazil)	7–0	(Chile) Santiago Morning
Gabi Nunes 16', 22'; Grazi 21'; Giovanna Crivelari 24'; Victória 51', 64'; Adriana 78' (pen.)	Report

José Amalfitani Stadium, Buenos Aires
Referee: Anahí Fernández (Uruguay)

14 March 2021
19:30

Boca Juniors (Argentina)	1–2	(Colombia) América
Palomar 78'	Report	Robledo 75', 89'

José Amalfitani Stadium, Buenos Aires
Referee: María Belén Carvajal (Chile)

15 March 2021
17:00

Universidad de Chile	3–1	(Colombia) Santa Fe
Gutiérrez 7' (pen.); López 53'; Pinilla 85'	Report	Acosta 28'

Estadio Nuevo Francisco Urbano, Morón
Referee: Adriana Farfán (Bolivia)

15 March 2021
19:30

River Plate (Argentina)	0–1	(Brazil) Ferroviária
	Report	Ana Alice 45'

Estadio Nuevo Francisco Urbano, Morón
Referee: Emikar Calderas (Venezuela)

=== Semi-finals ===
17 March 2021
17:00

Corinthians (Brazil)	1–1	(Colombia) América
Tamires 57'	Report	Guarecuco 90+3'
Penalties
Pardal (penalty scored); Juliete (penalty scored); Gabi Nunes (penalty missed); Adriana (penalty scored); Diany (penalty missed)	3–4	(penalty scored) Usme; (penalty scored) Rodríguez; (penalty scored) Iglesias; (penalty scored) Ospina

Estadio Nuevo Francisco Urbano, Morón
Referee: Adriana Farfán (Bolivia)

18 March 2021
17:00

Ferroviária (Brazil)	0–0	Universidad de Chile
	Report
Penalties
Luana Sartório (penalty scored); Daiane (penalty scored); Yasmin Cosmann (penalty scored); Géssica (penalty missed); Lurdinha (penalty scored); Duda Batista (penalty scored); Ana Alice (penalty missed); Amanda Brunner (penalty scored); Patrícia Sochor (penalty scored)	7–6	(penalty missed) Zamora; (penalty scored) Oviedo; (penalty scored) Gutiérrez; (penalty scored) Pinilla; (penalty scored) Guerrero; (penalty scored) López; (penalty missed) Fernández; (penalty scored) Sánchez; (penalty missed) Ramírez

Estadio Nuevo Francisco Urbano, Morón
Referee: Anahí Fernández (Uruguay)

=== Third place match ===
21 March 2021
17:00

Corinthians (Brazil)	4–0	Universidad de Chile
Adriana 35' (pen.); Victória 66', 89'; Juliete 75'	Report

José Amalfitani Stadium, Buenos Aires
Referee: Salomé di Iorio (Argentina)

=== Final ===
21 March 2021
19:45

América (Colombia)	1–2	(Brazil) Ferroviária
Usme 40' (pen.)	Report	Patrícia Sochor 7'; Aline Milene 43' (pen.)

José Amalfitani Stadium, Buenos Aires
Referee: María Belén Carvajal (Chile)

América	Ferroviária

GK	12	(Colombia) Katherine Tapia
DF	14	(Colombia) Lizeth Ocampo	(yellow card) 22'	(substituted off) 46'
DF	2	(Colombia) Daniela Arias	(yellow card) 76'
DF	17	(Colombia) Tatiana Castañeda
DF	16	(Venezuela) Leury Basanta
MF	8	(Colombia) Carolina Pineda	(yellow card) 73'
MF	4	(Colombia) Diana Ospina
MF	10	(Colombia) Catalina Usme (c)
FW	11	(Colombia) Manuela González		(substituted off) 77'
FW	7	(Colombia) Gisela Robledo		(substituted off) 86'
FW	18	(Colombia) Wendy Bonilla		(substituted off) 46'
Substitutes:
GK	1	(Colombia) Natalia Giraldo
GK	20	(Colombia) Luiza Montaño
DF	3	(Colombia) Anlly Iglesias			(substituted on) 90+1'
DF	5	(Colombia) Fabiana Yantén
MF	6	(Colombia) Jessica Caro		(substituted on) 46'	(substituted off) 90+1'
MF	15	(Colombia) Sara Sofía Martínez		(substituted on) 86'
MF	19	(Colombia) Mariana Zamorano
FW	9	(Venezuela) Joemar Guarecuco		(substituted on) 77'
FW	13	(Colombia) Gabriela Rodríguez		(substituted on) 46'
Manager:
(Colombia) Andrés Usme

GK	1	(Brazil) Luciana
DF	2	(Brazil) Monalisa	(yellow card) 31'	(substituted off) 68'
DF	3	(Brazil) Ana Alice
DF	16	(Brazil) Yasmin Cosmann		(substituted off) 46'
DF	6	(Brazil) Barrinha
MF	4	(Brazil) Luana Sartório
MF	13	(Brazil) Carol Tavares
MF	5	(Brazil) Nicoly
FW	7	(Brazil) Patrícia Sochor	(yellow card) 90+6'
FW	11	(Brazil) Lurdinha		(substituted off) 85'
FW	10	(Brazil) Aline Milene (c)		(substituted off) 90+5'
Substitutes:
GK	12	(Brazil) Lucilene
GK	18	(Brazil) Yanne
DF	19	(Brazil) Géssica	(yellow card) 69'	(substituted on) 46'
DF	20	(Brazil) Daiane		(substituted on) 85'
MF	8	(Brazil) Duda Batista		(substituted on) 90+5'
MF	14	(Brazil) Leidiane
MF	15	(Brazil) Amanda Brunner
MF	17	(Brazil) Rafa Mineira		(substituted on) 68'
Manager:
(Brazil) Lindsay Camila

== Top goalscorers ==
Rank	Player	Team	Goals
1	(Brazil) Gabi Nunes	(Brazil) Corinthians	7
1	(Brazil) Grazi	(Brazil) Corinthians	7
1	(Brazil) Victória	(Brazil) Corinthians	7
4	(Brazil) Giovanna Crivelari	(Brazil) Corinthians	5
5	(Brazil) Adriana	(Brazil) Corinthians	4
5	(Brazil) Lelê	(Brazil) Kindermann/Avaí	4
5	(Argentina) Yamila Rodríguez	(Argentina) Boca Juniors	4
8	(Brazil) Ana Alice	(Brazil) Ferroviária	3
8	(Colombia) Manuela González	(Colombia) América	3
8	(Argentina) Yael Oviedo	Universidad de Chile	3
8	(Argentina) Fabiana Vallejos	(Argentina) Boca Juniors	3
8	(Chile) Daniela Zamora	Universidad de Chile	3

=== 2020 Copa Libertadores Femenina team ===
The 2020 Copa Libertadores Femenina team was a squad consisting of the eleven most impressive players at the tournament.

Pos.	Player	Team
GK	(Chile) Natalia Campos	Universidad de Chile
DF	(Brazil) Katiuscia	(Brazil) Corinthians
DF	(Chile) Carla Guerrero	Universidad de Chile
DF	(Colombia) Daniela Arias	(Colombia) América de Cali
DF	(Brazil) Tamires	(Brazil) Corinthians
MF	(Brazil) Luana Sartório	(Brazil) Ferroviaria
MF	(Brazil) Andressinha	(Brazil) Corinthians
MF	(Colombia) Catalina Usme	(Colombia) América de Cali
FW	(Colombia) Gisela Robledo	(Colombia) América de Cali
FW	(Brazil) Aline Milene	(Brazil) Ferroviária
FW	(Brazil) Gabi Nunes	(Brazil) Corinthians
