= 2019 Copa Libertadores Femenina =

11th edition of the CONMEBOL Libertadores Femenina

Copa CONMEBOL Libertadores Femenina Ecuador 2019

Tournament details
- Host country: Ecuador
- City: Quito
- Dates: 11–28 October 2019
- Teams: 16 (from 10 associations)
- Venues: 2 (in 1 host city)

Final positions
- Champions: (Brazil) Corinthians (1st title)
- Runners-up: (Brazil) Ferroviária
- Third place: (Colombia) América
- Fourth place: (Paraguay) Cerro Porteño

Tournament statistics
- Matches played: 32
- Goals scored: 131 (4.09 per match)
- Top scorer: (Brazil) Nathane (9 goals)

The 2019 Copa CONMEBOL Libertadores Femenina was the 11th edition of the CONMEBOL Libertadores Femenina (also referred to as the Copa Libertadores Femenina), South America's premier women's club football tournament organized by CONMEBOL. The tournament was held in Quito, Ecuador from 11 to 28 October 2019.

The final originally scheduled for 27 October 2019 was rescheduled to 28 October 2019 due to a series of protests and riots in Ecuador. The final was played between the Brazilian teams Corinthians and Ferroviária, being the first final played between teams from the same country. Corinthians defeated Ferroviária 2–0 to win their second tournament title.

Atlético Huila, the defending champions, were eliminated in the quarter-finals by Ferroviária.

During the tournament, Mariana Larroquette (UAI Urquiza) scored against Municipal de Majes (64th minute, Group D) the 1000th goal of Copa Libertadores Femenina history.

== Format changes ==
Starting from this season, the tournament was expanded from 12 to 16 teams.

For the group stage, the 16 teams were drawn into four groups. Teams in each group played one another in a round-robin basis, with the top two teams of each group advancing to the quarter-finals. Starting from the quarter-finals, the teams played a single-elimination tournament.

== Teams ==
The 16 teams were:

- the champions of all ten CONMEBOL associations
- the title holders
- an additional team from the host association
- four additional teams from associations with the best historical performance in the tournament (Brazil, Chile, Colombia and Paraguay).

Association	Team	Qualifying method	Participation	Previous best result
Argentina	UAI Urquiza	2018–19 Campeonato de Fútbol Femenino de Primera División A champions	4th	Third place (2015)
Bolivia	Mundo Futuro	2019 Copa Simón Bolívar Femenina champions	3rd	Fourth place (2013)
Brazil	Corinthians	2018 Campeonato Brasileiro Feminino A1 champions	2nd (Note: Corinthians won the 2017 title as a partnership with Audax. They created their own team for the 2018 season.)	Champions (2017)
Brazil	Ferroviária	2018 Campeonato Brasileiro Feminino A1 fourth place (Note: Rio Preto (2018 Campeonato Brasileiro Feminino A1 runners-up) should have qualified for the Copa Libertadores but they closed their women's section. Third place Flamengo (in a partnership with the Brazilian Navy) preferred to participate in the 2019 Military World Games.)	3rd	Champions (2015)
Chile	Santiago Morning	2018 Campeonato Nacional Femenino champions	1st	—
Chile	Colo-Colo	2019 Copa Libertadores Femenina qualifying play-off winners (Note: ANFP announced that the additional berth for Chile was awarded to the winners of a qualifying play-off. It was played on 15 August 2019 at Estadio Bicentenario de La Florida between Palestino (2018 Campeonato Nacional Femenino runners-up) and Colo-Colo (best team in the historical ANFP and CONMEBOL rankings).)	9th	Champions (2012)
Colombia	Atlético Huila	2018 Copa Libertadores Femenina champions	2nd	Champions (2018)
Colombia	América	2019 Liga Femenina champions	1st	—
Colombia	Independiente Medellín/ Formas Íntimas	2019 Liga Femenina runners-up (Note: DIMAYOR and FCF announced that the additional berth for Colombia was awarded to the 2019 league runners-up.)	8th (Note: Formas Íntimas were runners-up in 2013. In 2019 they started a partnership with Independiente Medellín (1st participation).)	Runners-up (2013)
Ecuador (hosts)	Deportivo Cuenca	2019 SúperLiga Femenina champions	1st	—
Ecuador (hosts)	Ñañas	2019 SúperLiga Femenina runners-up (Host association additional entry)	1st	—
Paraguay	Cerro Porteño	2018 Torneo Femenino champions	6th	Third place (2014)
Paraguay	Libertad/Limpeño	2019 Torneo Apertura champions (Note: APF announced that the additional berth for Paraguay was awarded to Libertad/Limpeño as 2019 Torneo Apertura champions and 2016 Copa Libertadores Femenina champions.)	3rd (Note: Sportivo Limpeño won the 2016 title. In 2018 they started a partnership with Libertad (1st participation).)	Champions (2016)
Peru	Municipal de Majes	2018 Copa Perú Femenina champions	1st	—
Uruguay	Peñarol	2018 Campeonato Uruguayo “Mujeres del Uruguay” champions	2nd	Group stage (2018)
Venezuela	Estudiantes de Caracas	2019 Superliga Femenina champions	1st	—

== Venues ==
Matches were played in Quito. The stadiums were:

- Estadio Olímpico Atahualpa (capacity: 35,742)
- Estadio Rodrigo Paz Delgado (capacity: 41,575)

== Draw ==
The draw for the tournament was held on 30 September 2019, 16:00 ECT (UTC−5), at the Mercure Hotel Alameda Quito in Quito. The 16 teams were drawn into four groups of four containing a team from each of the four pots. The defending champions Atlético Huila and the Ecuadorian champions Deportivo Cuenca were automatically seeded into Pot 1 and allocated to positions A1 and B1, respectively, in the group stage. The Colombian champions América were automatically seeded into Pot 3, while the four additional teams from associations with the best historical performance were automatically seeded into Pot 4. The remaining teams were seeded based on the results of their association in the 2018 Copa Libertadores Femenina. Teams from the same association could not be drawn into the same group.

Pot 1	Pot 2	Pot 3	Pot 4
(Colombia) Atlético Huila (Position A1); (Ecuador) Deportivo Cuenca (Position B1); (Brazil) Corinthians; (Chile) Santiago Morning	(Argentina) UAI Urquiza; (Venezuela) Estudiantes de Caracas; (Ecuador) Ñañas; (Uruguay) Peñarol	(Peru) Municipal de Majes; (Paraguay) Cerro Porteño; (Bolivia) Mundo Futuro; (Colombia) América^{[1]}	(Brazil) Ferroviária; (Chile) Colo-Colo; (Colombia) Independiente Medellín/Formas Íntimas^{[1]}; (Paraguay) Libertad/Limpeño

^{1} The draw was held before the identities of the Colombian champions (América) and runners-up (Independiente Medellín/Formas Íntimas) were known.

== 2019 Ecuadorian protests ==
One week before the beginning of the tournament, various protests began in Ecuador after the government announced an end to fuel subsidies as part of public spending cuts agreed with the IMF in return for a loan. On 12 October 2019, two days into the tournament, none of the scheduled Group C and Group D matches were played due to security concerns caused by the protests. The Ecuadorian government and leaders representing the Andean nation's indigenous peoples reached an agreement on 13 October 2019 to repeal the decree that eliminated fuel subsidies. CONMEBOL later announced the competition would be resumed on 14 October 2019 with a modified schedule.

Finally, the group stage was extended from 18 to 19 October, the quarter-finals were rescheduled from 20 and 21 to 21 and 22 October, semi-finals from 23 and 24 to 24 and 25 October and the final and third place match from 27 to 28 October.

== Group stage ==
Four matches were played on opening day but CONMEBOL suspended the four games scheduled for 12 October 2019 due to security concerns caused by a civil unrest. CONMEBOL later announced the competition would be resumed on 14 October 2017 with a modified schedule.

In the group stage, the teams were ranked according to points (3 points for a win, 1 point for a draw, 0 points for a loss). If tied on points, tiebreakers would be applied in the following order (Regulations Article 21).

1. Goal difference;
2. Goals scored;
3. Head-to-head result in games between tied teams;
4. Number of red cards;
5. Number of yellow cards;
6. Drawing of lots.

The winners and runners-up of each group advanced to the quarter-finals.

All times are local, ECT (UTC−5).

=== Group A ===
Pos	Team	Pld	W	D	L	GF	GA	GD	Pts	Qualification
1	(Colombia) Atlético Huila	3	3	0	0	8	2	+6	9	Quarter-finals
2	(Paraguay) Cerro Porteño	3	2	0	1	4	5	−1	6	Quarter-finals
3	(Uruguay) Peñarol	3	0	1	2	3	5	−2	1	
4	(Chile) Colo-Colo	3	0	1	2	5	8	−3	1	

Source: CONMEBOL
11 October 2019
17:00

Atlético Huila (Colombia)	2–1	(Uruguay) Peñarol
Peña 39'; Chacón 41'	Report	Rolfo 28'

Estadio Olímpico Atahualpa, Quito
Referee: María Cornejo (Ecuador)
11 October 2019
19:30

Cerro Porteño (Paraguay)	3–2	(Chile) Colo-Colo
Bogarín 22', 45+16'; Agüero 72'	Report	Jiménez 23'; Quezada 44'

Estadio Olímpico Atahualpa, Quito
Referee: Emikar Calderas (Venezuela)

15 October 2019
17:00

Atlético Huila (Colombia)	3–0	(Paraguay) Cerro Porteño
Arbeláez 45+4'; Romero 49', 61'	Report

Estadio Olímpico Atahualpa, Quito
Referee: Adriana Farfán (Bolivia)
15 October 2019
19:30

Peñarol (Uruguay)	2–2	(Chile) Colo-Colo
Viana 69', 77'	Report	Olave 54'; Hidalgo 84' (pen.)

Estadio Olímpico Atahualpa, Quito
Referee: Estela Álvarez (Argentina)

18 October 2019
17:00

Colo-Colo (Chile)	1–3	(Colombia) Atlético Huila
Hidalgo 20'	Report	Romero 22', 76'; Constante 51'

Estadio Olímpico Atahualpa, Quito
Referee: Priscila Vásquez (Peru)
18 October 2019
17:00

Peñarol (Uruguay)	0–1	(Paraguay) Cerro Porteño
	Report	Da Silva 85' (o.g.)

Estadio Rodrigo Paz Delgado, Quito
Referee: Rejane Caetano da Silva (Brazil)

=== Group B ===
Pos	Team	Pld	W	D	L	GF	GA	GD	Pts	Qualification
1	(Ecuador) Deportivo Cuenca	3	3	0	0	10	3	+7	9	Quarter-finals
2	(Brazil) Ferroviária	3	2	0	1	15	4	+11	6	Quarter-finals
3	(Venezuela) Estudiantes de Caracas	3	1	0	2	4	7	−3	3	
4	(Bolivia) Mundo Futuro	3	0	0	3	2	17	−15	0	

Source: CONMEBOL
11 October 2019
17:00

Deportivo Cuenca (Ecuador)	3–1	(Venezuela) Estudiantes de Caracas
Riera 59', 81', 86' (pen.)	Report	Villasana 89' (pen.)

Estadio Rodrigo Paz Delgado, Quito
Referee: Dione Rissios (Chile)
11 October 2019
19:30

Mundo Futuro (Bolivia)	1–10	(Brazil) Ferroviária
Doerksen 71'	Report	Nathane 8', 9', 47', 53', 60'; Rosana 13'; Rafa Mineira 41', 90+1'; Luana Sartório 49'; Aline Milene 63'

Estadio Rodrigo Paz Delgado, Quito
Referee: Vanessa Ceballos (Colombia)

15 October 2019
17:00

Deportivo Cuenca (Ecuador)	5–1	(Bolivia) Mundo Futuro
Lattanzio 6', 90'; Gracia 76'; Charcopa 84'; Riera 90+4'	Report	Morón 66'

Estadio Rodrigo Paz Delgado, Quito
Referee: Priscila Vásquez (Peru)
15 October 2019
19:30

Estudiantes de Caracas (Venezuela)	1–4	(Brazil) Ferroviária
Lizcano 88'	Report	Nathane 53', 87'; Aline Milene 78'; Luana Sartório 90+3'

Estadio Rodrigo Paz Delgado, Quito
Referee: Zulma Quiñónez (Paraguay)

18 October 2019
19:30

Ferroviária (Brazil)	1–2	(Ecuador) Deportivo Cuenca
Aline Milene 80'	Report	Gracia 31'; Riera 88'

Estadio Olímpico Atahualpa, Quito
Referee: Adriana Farfán (Bolivia)
18 October 2019
19:30

Estudiantes de Caracas (Venezuela)	2–0	(Bolivia) Mundo Futuro
D. Rodríguez 6'; Flórez 32'	Report

Estadio Rodrigo Paz Delgado, Quito
Referee: Vanessa Ceballos (Colombia)

=== Group C ===
Pos	Team	Pld	W	D	L	GF	GA	GD	Pts	Qualification
1	(Brazil) Corinthians	3	2	1	0	8	4	+4	7	Quarter-finals
2	(Colombia) América	3	2	0	1	8	4	+4	6	Quarter-finals
3	(Paraguay) Libertad/Limpeño	3	1	1	1	5	3	+2	4	
4	(Ecuador) Ñañas	3	0	0	3	2	12	−10	0	

Source: CONMEBOL
14 October 2019
17:00

Corinthians (Brazil)	3–1	(Ecuador) Ñañas
Millene 11'; Grazi 14'; Juliete 31'	Report	Zambrano 90+4'

Estadio Olímpico Atahualpa, Quito
Referee: Nadia Fuques (Uruguay)
14 October 2019
19:30

América (Colombia)	1–0	(Paraguay) Libertad/Limpeño
Usme 31'	Report

Estadio Olímpico Atahualpa, Quito
Referee: Salomé di Iorio (Argentina)

17 October 2019
17:00

Corinthians (Brazil)	3–1	(Colombia) América
Victória 32'; Millene 46', 56'	Report	Usme 40' (pen.)

Estadio Olímpico Atahualpa, Quito
Referee: Emikar Calderas (Venezuela)
17 October 2019
19:30

Ñañas (Ecuador)	0–3	(Paraguay) Libertad/Limpeño
	Report	Peña 37', 43'; Garay López 52' (pen.)

Estadio Olímpico Atahualpa, Quito
Referee: Dione Rissios (Chile)

19 October 2019
17:00

Libertad/Limpeño (Paraguay)	2–2	(Brazil) Corinthians
Peña 19'; Garay López 45+3'	Report	Victória 61'; Katiuscia 73'

Estadio Olímpico Atahualpa, Quito
Referee: Salomé di Iorio (Argentina)
19 October 2019
17:00

Ñañas (Ecuador)	1–6	(Colombia) América
Corozo 50'	Report	Robledo 5', 69', 85'; Taborda 75'; R. Caicedo 82'; Usme 90+1'

Estadio Rodrigo Paz Delgado, Quito
Referee: Dione Rissios (Chile)

=== Group D ===
Pos	Team	Pld	W	D	L	GF	GA	GD	Pts	Qualification
1	(Argentina) UAI Urquiza	3	2	1	0	10	3	+7	7	Quarter-finals
2	(Chile) Santiago Morning	3	1	2	0	8	3	+5	5	Quarter-finals
3	(Colombia) Independiente Medellín/Formas Íntimas	3	1	1	1	8	3	+5	4	
4	(Peru) Municipal de Majes	3	0	0	3	0	17	−17	0	

Source: CONMEBOL
14 October 2019
17:00

Santiago Morning (Chile)	2–2	(Argentina) UAI Urquiza
Roa 6'; Mardones 35'	Report	Ugarte 50'; Schell 56'

Estadio Rodrigo Paz Delgado, Quito
Referee: Zulma Quiñónez (Paraguay)
14 October 2019
19:30

Municipal de Majes (Peru)	0–6	(Colombia) Independiente Medellín/Formas Íntimas
	Report	Castañeda 54'; Cuesta 62'; Pérez 63'; Ospina 65'; Velásquez 89'; Aguirre 90+5' (pen.)

Estadio Rodrigo Paz Delgado, Quito
Referee: Rejane Caetano da Silva (Brazil)

17 October 2019
17:00

Santiago Morning (Chile)	5–0	(Peru) Municipal de Majes
Rojas 17', 60', 68'; Pardo 25'; Roa 65'	Report

Estadio Rodrigo Paz Delgado, Quito
Referee: Nadia Fuques (Uruguay)
17 October 2019
19:30

UAI Urquiza (Argentina)	2–1	(Colombia) Independiente Medellín/Formas Íntimas
Mesa 45+1'; Larroquette 61'	Report	Aguirre 10'

Estadio Rodrigo Paz Delgado, Quito
Referee: María Cornejo (Ecuador)

19 October 2019
19:30

Independiente Medellín/Formas Íntimas (Colombia)	1–1	(Chile) Santiago Morning
Ospina 21'	Report	Borgella 18' (pen.)

Estadio Olímpico Atahualpa, Quito
Referee: Zulma Quiñónez (Paraguay)
19 October 2019
19:30

UAI Urquiza (Argentina)	6–0	(Peru) Municipal de Majes
Larroquette 16', 33', 53', 64'; Ugarte 55'; Delgado 77'	Report

Estadio Rodrigo Paz Delgado, Quito
Referee: Emikar Calderas (Venezuela)

== Final stages ==
Starting from the quarter-finals, the teams played a single-elimination tournament. If tied after full time, extra time would not be played, and the penalty shoot-out would be used to determine the winners (Regulations Article 23).

=== Bracket ===
Quarter-finals
21 October – Estadio Olímpico Atahualpa
(Colombia) Atlético Huila	2
(Brazil) Ferroviária	3
21 October – Estadio Olímpico Atahualpa
(Ecuador) Deportivo Cuenca	3 (3)
(Paraguay) Cerro Porteño (p)	3 (4)
22 October – Estadio Olímpico Atahualpa
(Brazil) Corinthians	2
(Chile) Santiago Morning	0
22 October – Estadio Olímpico Atahualpa
(Argentina) UAI Urquiza	2
(Colombia) América	3

Semi-finals
24 October – Estadio Olímpico Atahualpa
(Brazil) Ferroviária	2
(Paraguay) Cerro Porteño	1
25 October – Estadio Olímpico Atahualpa
(Brazil) Corinthians	4
(Colombia) América	0

Final
28 October – Estadio Olímpico Atahualpa
(Brazil) Ferroviária	0
(Brazil) Corinthians	2
Third place
28 October – Estadio Olímpico Atahualpa
(Paraguay) Cerro Porteño	1
(Colombia) América	3

=== Quarter-finals ===
21 October 2019
17:00

Atlético Huila (Colombia)	2–3	(Brazil) Ferroviária
Romero 24', 57'	Report	Maglia 32', 65'; Nathane 48'

Estadio Olímpico Atahualpa, Quito
Referee: Emikar Calderas (Venezuela)

21 October 2019
19:30

Deportivo Cuenca (Ecuador)	3–3	(Paraguay) Cerro Porteño
Riera 13', 25', 57'	Report	Fretes 32'; Agüero 38'; Bogarín 83'
Penalties
Fajardo (penalty missed); Cuadra (penalty scored); Lattanzio (penalty missed); Avilés (penalty scored); Riera (penalty scored); Jhonson (penalty missed)	3–4	(penalty scored) Fretes; (penalty missed) Bogarín; (penalty missed) M. Ayala; (penalty scored) Fleitas; (penalty scored) Agüero; (penalty scored) Saleb

Estadio Olímpico Atahualpa, Quito
Referee: Salomé di Iorio (Argentina)

22 October 2019
17:00

Corinthians (Brazil)	2–0	(Chile) Santiago Morning
Giovanna Crivelari 28'; Juliete 46'	Report

Estadio Olímpico Atahualpa, Quito
Referee: María Cornejo (Ecuador)

22 October 2019
19:30

UAI Urquiza (Argentina)	2–3	(Colombia) América
Larroquette 76' (pen.); Bueno 88'	Report	Robledo 61'; F. Caicedo 65'; Usme 70'

Estadio Olímpico Atahualpa, Quito
Referee: Nadia Fuques (Uruguay)

=== Semi-finals ===
24 October 2019
19:30

Ferroviária (Brazil)	2–1	(Paraguay) Cerro Porteño
Nathane 13'; Aline Milene 61'	Report	Fretes 30' (pen.)

Estadio Olímpico Atahualpa, Quito
Referee: Nadia Fuques (Uruguay)

25 October 2019
19:30

Corinthians (Brazil)	4–0	(Colombia) América
Millene 45+3', 75'; Érika 79'; Grazi 84'	Report

Estadio Olímpico Atahualpa, Quito
Referee: Dione Rissios (Chile)

=== Third place match ===
28 October 2019
17:00

Cerro Porteño (Paraguay)	1–3	(Colombia) América
Agüero 34'	Report	Robledo 18', 24'; Pulgarín 90+1'

Estadio Olímpico Atahualpa, Quito
Referee: Salomé di Iorio (Argentina)

=== Final ===
Luana Sartório (Ferroviária) and Ingryd (Corinthians), sent off and booked in the semi-finals respectively, were suspended and could not play in the final.

28 October 2019
19:30

Ferroviária (Brazil)	0–2	(Brazil) Corinthians
	Report	Giovanna Crivelari 74'; Juliete 90'

Estadio Olímpico Atahualpa, Quito
Referee: Emikar Calderas (Venezuela)

Ferroviária	Corinthians

GK	1	(Brazil) Luciana
DF	13	(Brazil) Monalisa		(substituted off) 78'
DF	19	(Brazil) Géssica
DF	3	(Brazil) Andréia
DF	6	(Brazil) Barrinha	(yellow card) 27'
MF	5	(Brazil) Maglia (c)
MF	14	(Brazil) Rafa Andrade
MF	17	(Brazil) Rafa Mineira		(substituted off) 69'
FW	11	(Brazil) Nenê		(substituted off) 63'
FW	9	(Brazil) Nathane
FW	10	(Brazil) Aline Milene
Substitutes:
GK	12	(Brazil) Jeane
DF	2	(Brazil) Gabi Arcanjo		(substituted on) 78'
DF	18	(Brazil) Isabela
MF	7	(Brazil) Flávia
MF	8	(Brazil) Carol Tavares	(yellow card) 82'	(substituted on) 69'
MF	15	(Brazil) Gabi Lopes
MF	16	(Brazil) Rosana		(substituted on) 63'
FW	20	(Brazil) Thaicyane
Manager:
(Brazil) Tatiele Silveira

GK	12	(Brazil) Lelê
DF	2	(Brazil) Katiuscia	(yellow card) 77'
DF	3	(Brazil) Pardal
DF	8	(Brazil) Érika
DF	6	(Brazil) Juliete
MF	7	(Brazil) Grazi (c)
MF	10	(Brazil) Gabi Zanotti
MF	20	(Brazil) Paulinha		(substituted off) 64'
MF	11	(Brazil) Tamires		(substituted off) 90+2'
FW	14	(Brazil) Millene
FW	17	(Brazil) Victória
Substitutes:
GK	1	(Brazil) Tainá
DF	4	(Brazil) Giovanna Campiolo
DF	15	(Brazil) Mimi
DF	16	(Brazil) Suellen
FW	9	(Brazil) Moniquinha
FW	13	(Brazil) Cacau		(substituted on) 90+2'
FW	18	(Brazil) Maiara
FW	19	(Brazil) Giovanna Crivelari		(substituted on) 64'
Manager:
(Brazil) Arthur Elias

== Top goalscorers ==
Rank	Player	Team	Goals
1	(Brazil) Nathane	(Brazil) Ferroviária	9
2	(Ecuador) Madelin Riera	(Ecuador) Deportivo Cuenca	8
3	(Argentina) Mariana Larroquette	(Argentina) UAI Urquiza	6
3	(Colombia) Gisela Robledo	(Colombia) América	6
3	(Colombia) Kena Romero	(Colombia) Atlético Huila	6
6	(Brazil) Millene	(Brazil) Corinthians	5
7	(Brazil) Aline Milene	(Brazil) Ferroviária	4
7	(Colombia) Catalina Usme	(Colombia) América	4
9	(Paraguay) Marta Agüero	(Paraguay) Cerro Porteño	3
9	(Paraguay) Dahiana Bogarín	(Paraguay) Cerro Porteño	3
9	(Brazil) Juliete	(Brazil) Corinthians	3
9	(Paraguay) Liz Peña	(Paraguay) Libertad/Limpeño	3
9	(Chile) María José Rojas	(Chile) Santiago Morning	3

== Broadcasting ==
- (Brazil) DAZN
- (Chile) CDF
- (Uruguay) Vera+

Elsewhere in South America and other countries, the matches were broadcast through the official CONMEBOL Libertadores pages on Facebook and YouTube.

== See also ==
- 2019–20 UEFA Women's Champions League
- 2019 AFC Women's Club Championship
