= 2015 Copa Libertadores Femenina =

Copa Libertadores Femenina 2015 Colombia

Tournament details
- Host country: Colombia
- Dates: 28 October – 8 November
- Teams: 12 (from 10 associations)
- Venues: 4 (in 3 host cities)

Final positions
- Champions: (Brazil) Ferroviária (1st title)
- Runners-up: (Chile) Colo-Colo
- Third place: (Argentina) UAI Urquiza
- Fourth place: (Brazil) São José

Tournament statistics
- Matches played: 22
- Goals scored: 94 (4.27 per match)
- Top scorer: (Colombia) Catalina Usme (8 goals)
- Fair play award: (Chile) Colo-Colo

The 2015 Copa Libertadores Femenina was the 7th edition of the Copa Libertadores Femenina, South America's premier women's club football tournament organized by CONMEBOL. The tournament was held in Colombia, from 28 October to 8 November 2015. It was the first time the tournament was hosted outside Brazil.

The final was won by Ferroviária 3–1 over Colo-Colo the sixth time a Brazilian team has won the title.

== Teams ==
The competition was contested by 12 teams: the title holder, the champion club from each of the ten CONMEBOL member associations, and one additional team from the host association Colombia.

Association	Team	Qualifying method	Participation	Best result
Argentina	UAI Urquiza	2014 Torneo Final and 2015 Torneo play-off winner	1st	n/a
Bolivia	San Martín de Porres	2015 Campeonato Boliviano champion	1st	n/a
Brazil	São José	Title holder (2014 champion)	5th	Champion (2011, 2013, 2014)
Brazil	Ferroviária	2014 Copa do Brasil de Futebol Feminino champion	1st	n/a
Chile	Colo-Colo	2014 Torneo Apertura and Torneo Clausura champion	5th	Champion (2012)
Colombia	Formas Íntimas	2015 Copa Prelibertadores winner	7th	Runner-up (2013)
Colombia	Real Pasión	2015 Copa Prelibertadores runner-up	1st	n/a
Ecuador	Espuce	2015 Campeonato Ecuatoriano first stage winner (Note: Because the 2015 season only finished in December, the leading team after the first stage qualified to the tournament. Eventually second stage winner Unión Española won the Ecuatorian championship that year.)	1st	n/a
Paraguay	Cerro Porteño	2014 Campeonato Paraguayo champion	3rd	Third place (2014)
Peru	Universitario	2015 Campeonato Peruano champion	1st	n/a
Uruguay	Colón	2014 Copa de Oro winner	2nd	Group stage (2014)
Venezuela	Estudiantes de Guárico	2015 Campeonato Venezolano champion	2nd	Group stage (2013)

== Venues ==
The tournament was played in four venues in three cities, all in the Metropolitan Area of Medellín:

- Estadio Atanasio Girardot, Medellín
- Estadio Cincuentenario, Medellín
- Estadio Municipal, Girardota
- Estadio Polideportivo Sur, Envigado

== Match officials ==
A total of 10 referees and 10 assistant referees (one each per association) were appointed for the tournament.

Association	Referee	Assistant referee
Argentina	María Laura Fortunato	Daiana Milone
Bolivia	Janette Vera	Claudia Mollinedo
Brazil	Ana Marques	Janette Arcanjo
Chile	Paola Barría	Marcia Castillo
Colombia	Yeimi Martínez	Luz Amalia Ruiz
Ecuador	Johana Haro	Dayana Paredes
Paraguay	Zulma Quiñónez	Nilda Gamarra
Peru	Melany Bermejo	Carmen Retuerto
Uruguay	Claudia Umpiérrez	Luciana Mascaraña
Venezuela	Eryelizt Escalona	Yoleida Lara

== Format ==
Prize money
Rank	US Dollar
1st	25,000
2nd	20,000
3rd	15,000
4th	10,000
5–12th	5,000

The same format as last year was used:

- The 12 teams were divided into three groups of four in the first stage, where each group was played on a round-robin basis.
- The winners of each group and the best runner-up among all groups advanced to the second stage, which were played on a single-elimination basis.
- The semifinal matchups were:
  - Group A winner vs. Group B winner
  - Group C winner vs. Best runner-up
- The semifinal winners and losers played in the final and third place match respectively.

== Draw ==
The draw of the tournament was held on 16 October 2015 during the CONMEBOL Executive Committee meeting at the Hyatt Hotel in Santiago, Chile. The 12 teams were drawn into three groups of four containing one team from each of the four seeding pots.

Pot 1	Pot 2	Pot 3	Pot 4
(Argentina) UAI Urquiza (Brazil) São José (Colombia) Formas Íntimas	(Brazil) Ferroviária (Chile) Colo-Colo (Colombia) Real Pasión	(Ecuador) Espuce (Paraguay) Cerro Porteño (Peru) Universitario	(Bolivia) San Martín de Porres (Uruguay) Colón (Venezuela) Estudiantes de Guárico

== First stage ==
The schedule of the tournament was announced on 20 October 2015.

The teams were ranked according to points (3 points for a win, 1 point for a draw, 0 points for a loss). If tied on points, tiebreakers would be applied in the following order:

1. Goal difference in all games;
2. Goals scored in all games;
3. Head-to-head result in games between tied teams;
4. Drawing of lots.

All times local, COT (UTC−5).

=== Group A ===
Pos	Team	Pld	W	D	L	GF	GA	GD	Pts	Qualification
1	(Brazil) São José	3	2	1	0	12	1	+11	7	Second stage
2	(Venezuela) Estudiantes de Guárico	3	1	1	1	5	5	0	4	
3	(Paraguay) Cerro Porteño	3	1	1	1	3	7	−4	4	
4	(Colombia) Real Pasión (H)	3	0	1	2	1	8	−7	1	

Source: CONMEBOL
(H) Hosts
29 October 2015
14:00

Real Pasión (Colombia)	0–0	(Paraguay) Cerro Porteño
	Report

Estadio Cincuentenario, Medellín
Referee: María Laura Fortunato (Argentina)
29 October 2015
16:00

São José (Brazil)	1–1	(Venezuela) Estudiantes de Guárico
Renata Diniz 86'	Report	Viso 41' (pen.)

Estadio Cincuentenario, Medellín
Referee: Melany Bermejo (Peru)

31 October 2015
12:00

Real Pasión (Colombia)	1–2	(Venezuela) Estudiantes de Guárico
Balcázar 13'	Report	Astudillo 43'; Guzmán 88'

Estadio Cincuentenario, Medellín
Referee: Janette Vera (Bolivia)
31 October 2015
15:30

São José (Brazil)	5–0	(Paraguay) Cerro Porteño
Rita Bove 7', 65', 67' (pen.); Michele Carioca 14'; Ludmila 90+2'	Report

Estadio Cincuentenario, Medellín
Referee: Claudia Umpiérrez (Uruguay)

São José v Cerro Porteño was suspended after 50 minutes due to heavy rain. It was resumed on 1 November 2015, 14:15, at the Estadio Atanasio Girardot, Medellín.

2 November 2015
11:00

Cerro Porteño (Paraguay)	3–2	(Venezuela) Estudiantes de Guárico
Safuan 27'; Álvarez 66'; Fleitas 90+4'	Report	Villamizar 85'; Mendoza 90+3'

Estadio Municipal, Girardota
Referee: Paola Barría (Chile)
2 November 2015
11:00

São José (Brazil)	6–0	(Colombia) Real Pasión
Rita Bove 1', 45' (pen.); Pepê 30'; Chú 51', 52', 67'	Report

Estadio Cincuentenario, Medellín
Referee: Johana Haro (Ecuador)

=== Group B ===
Pos	Team	Pld	W	D	L	GF	GA	GD	Pts	Qualification
1	(Brazil) Ferroviária	3	2	1	0	9	0	+9	7	Second stage
2	(Argentina) UAI Urquiza	3	2	1	0	6	4	+2	7	Second stage
3	(Uruguay) Colón	3	1	0	2	6	9	−3	3	
4	(Ecuador) Espuce	3	0	0	3	2	10	−8	0	

Source: CONMEBOL
29 October 2015
09:00

Ferroviária (Brazil)	5–0	(Ecuador) Espuce
Juliana Santos 11'; Nenê 17', 20', 67', 90'	Report

Estadio Municipal, Girardota
Referee: Eryelizt Escalona (Venezuela)
29 October 2015
12:00

UAI Urquiza (Argentina)	4–3	(Uruguay) Colón
Ugarte 46', 51', 55'; Bonsegundo 84' (pen.)	Report	Domeniguini 22', 79'; Viana 32'

Estadio Municipal, Girardota
Referee: Zulma Quiñónez (Paraguay)

31 October 2015
09:00

Ferroviária (Brazil)	4–0	(Uruguay) Colón
Daiane 30' (pen.); Barrinha 35'; Tábatha 40'; Rafa Mineira 54'	Report

Estadio Municipal, Girardota
Referee: Yeimi Martínez (Colombia)
31 October 2015
12:00

UAI Urquiza (Argentina)	2–1	(Ecuador) Espuce
Ugarte 26'; Bedini 53'	Report	Pulla 86'

Estadio Municipal, Girardota
Referee: Paola Barría (Chile)

2 November 2015
13:30

UAI Urquiza (Argentina)	0–0	(Brazil) Ferroviária
	Report

Estadio Municipal, Girardota
Referee: Zulma Quiñónez (Paraguay)
2 November 2015
14:00

Espuce (Ecuador)	1–3	(Uruguay) Colón
Rodríguez 55'	Report	Suárez 2'; Viana 12', 90'

Estadio Cincuentenario, Medellín
Referee: Melany Bermejo (Peru)

=== Group C ===
Pos	Team	Pld	W	D	L	GF	GA	GD	Pts	Qualification
1	(Chile) Colo-Colo	3	3	0	0	11	1	+10	9	Second stage
2	(Colombia) Formas Íntimas (H)	3	2	0	1	20	3	+17	6	
3	(Bolivia) San Martín de Porres	3	1	0	2	8	16	−8	3	
4	(Peru) Universitario	3	0	0	3	2	21	−19	0	

Source: CONMEBOL
(H) Hosts
28 October 2015
11:00

Colo-Colo (Chile)	4–0	(Peru) Universitario
C. Soto 12', 68'; Villamayor 49'; Guerrero 79'	Report

Estadio Polideportivo Sur, Envigado
Referee: Claudia Umpiérrez (Uruguay)
28 October 2015
17:00

Formas Íntimas (Colombia)	9–1	(Bolivia) San Martín de Porres
Cuesta 3'; Velásquez 12'; Usme 15', 71', 77', 90'; Castañeda 23'; G. Cardona 48'; Peñaloza 73'	Report	López 65'

Estadio Atanasio Girardot, Medellín
Referee: Ana Marques (Brazil)

30 October 2015
12:00

Colo-Colo (Chile)	5–1	(Bolivia) San Martín de Porres
Villamayor 19' (pen.), 26'; Aedo 69'; Sáez 72'; Guerrero 90+2'	Report	O. Sandoval 13'

Estadio Polideportivo Sur, Envigado
Referee: Johana Haro (Ecuador)
30 October 2015
15:00

Formas Íntimas (Colombia)	11–0	(Peru) Universitario
Vanegas 7'; Cuesta 20', 45', 48', 70'; Peñaloza 46', 60'; Usme 50', 85', 88', 90+1'	Report

Estadio Atanasio Girardot, Medellín
Referee: Ana Marques (Brazil)

1 November 2015
12:00

Universitario (Peru)	2–6	(Bolivia) San Martín de Porres
Flores 56'; Fernández 90'	Report	López 15', 71', 85'; Cárdenas 17'; O. Sandoval 45', 53'

Estadio Polideportivo Sur, Envigado
Referee: Eryelizt Escalona (Venezuela)
1 November 2015
12:00

Formas Íntimas (Colombia)	0–2	(Chile) Colo-Colo
	Report	Villamayor 6', 57'

Estadio Atanasio Girardot, Medellín
Referee: María Laura Fortunato (Argentina)

=== Ranking of second-placed teams ===
Pos	Grp	Team	Pld	W	D	L	GF	GA	GD	Pts	Qualification
1	B	(Argentina) UAI Urquiza	3	2	1	0	6	4	+2	7	Second stage
2	C	(Colombia) Formas Íntimas	3	2	0	1	20	3	+17	6	
3	A	(Venezuela) Estudiantes de Guárico	3	1	1	1	5	5	0	4	

Source: CONMEBOL
Rules for classification: 1) points; 2) goal difference; 3) goals scored; 4) drawing of lots.

== Second stage ==
If tied after regulation time, the penalty shoot-out would be used to determine the winner (no extra time would be played).

=== Bracket ===
Semi-finals
5 November – Envigado
(Brazil) São José	0
(Brazil) Ferroviária	1
5 November – Envigado
(Chile) Colo-Colo	2
(Argentina) UAI Urquiza	0

Final
8 November – Medellín
(Brazil) Ferroviária	3
(Chile) Colo-Colo	1
Third place
8 November – Medellín
(Brazil) São José	1 (5)
(Argentina) UAI Urquiza (p)	1 (6)

=== Semifinals ===
5 November 2015
10:00

São José (Brazil)	0–1	(Brazil) Ferroviária
	Report	Nenê 1'

Estadio Polideportivo Sur, Envigado
Referee: Eryelizt Escalona (Venezuela)

5 November 2015
13:00

Colo-Colo (Chile)	2–0	(Argentina) UAI Urquiza
Sáez 41'; F. Lara 79'	Report

Estadio Polideportivo Sur, Envigado
Referee: Claudia Umpiérrez (Uruguay)

=== Third place match ===
8 November 2015
09:00

São José (Brazil)	1–1	(Argentina) UAI Urquiza
Rita Bove 89'	Report	Bonsegundo 90'
Penalties
	5–6

Estadio Atanasio Girardot, Medellín
Referee: Zulma Quiñónez (Paraguay)

=== Final ===
Colo-Colo played in their third final. They lost in 2011 and won the trophy in 2012. For Ferroviária it was their first final. As in every previous edition, a Brazilian team was playing in the final.

8 November 2015
12:00

Ferroviária (Brazil)	3–1	(Chile) Colo-Colo
Tábatha 18', 25'; Barrinha 43'	Report	Villamayor 45+2' (pen.)

Estadio Atanasio Girardot, Medellín
Referee: María Laura Fortunato (Argentina)

GK	18	(Brazil) Amanda
DF	2	(Brazil) Daiane (c)
DF	3	(Brazil) Mimi	(yellow card) 45+1'
DF	4	(Brazil) Juliana Santos
DF	6	(Brazil) Barrinha
MF	7	(Brazil) Nicoly
MF	5	(Brazil) Julia Bianchi		(substituted off) 83'
MF	8	(Brazil) Patrícia Llanos		(substituted off) 80'
MF	10	(Brazil) Rafa Mineira	(yellow card) 51'
FW	9	(Brazil) Nenê
FW	11	(Brazil) Tábatha		(substituted off) 72'
Substitutes:
GK	1	(Brazil) Bruna
GK	12	(Brazil) Thaís Helena
DF	13	(Brazil) Kemely
DF	14	(Brazil) Luana Sartório	(yellow card) 90+3'	(substituted on) 83'
DF	15	(Brazil) Isabela Queiroz
MF	16	(Brazil) Thaíni
FW	17	(Brazil) Cacau		(substituted on) 80'
FW	20	(Brazil) Nuty		(substituted on) 72'
Manager:
(Brazil) Leonardo André Mendes

GK	1	(Chile) Christiane Endler (c)
DF	2	(Chile) Rocío Soto
DF	18	(Chile) Camila Sáez
DF	3	(Chile) Carla Guerrero
DF	11	(Chile) Geraldine Leyton	(substituted off) 61'
MF	7	(Chile) Yanara Aedo
MF	6	(Chile) Claudia Soto
MF	4	(Chile) Francisca Lara
FW	5	(Chile) Melisa Rodríguez	(substituted off) 59'
FW	9	(Chile) Francisca Moroso	(substituted off) 71'
FW	17	(Paraguay) Gloria Villamayor
Substitutes:
GK	12	(Chile) Romina Parraguirre
DF	13	(Chile) Tyare Ríos
DF	14	(Chile) Victoria Osorio
DF	20	(Chile) Yesenia Arenas
MF	8	(Venezuela) Yusmery Ascanio	(substituted on) 61'
MF	16	(Chile) Ana Gutiérrez
FW	15	(Chile) Paulina Lara	(substituted on) 71'
FW	19	(Chile) Yessenia Huenteo	(substituted on) 59'
Manager:
(Chile) Eduardo Míguez

== Top goalscorers ==
Catalina Usme won the top-scorer award with eight goals in three matches.

Rank	Player	Team	Goals
1	(Colombia) Catalina Usme	(Colombia) Formas Íntimas	8
2	(Paraguay) Gloria Villamayor	(Chile) Colo-Colo	6
3	(Colombia) Yisela Cuesta	(Colombia) Formas Íntimas	5
3	(Brazil) Rita Bove	(Brazil) São José	5
5	(Brazil) Nenê	(Brazil) Ferroviária	4
5	(Argentina) Paula Ugarte	(Argentina) UAI Urquiza	4
7	(Brazil) Chú	(Brazil) São José	3
7	(Argentina) Yanina López	(Bolivia) San Martín de Porres	3
7	(Colombia) Jennifer Peñaloza	(Colombia) Formas Íntimas	3
7	(Bolivia) Olga Sandoval	(Bolivia) San Martín de Porres	3
7	(Brazil) Tábatha	(Brazil) Ferroviária	3
7	(Uruguay) Lourdes Viana	(Uruguay) Colón	3
