= Umpiérrez =

Umpiérrez is a surname. Notable people with the surname include:

- Claudia Umpiérrez (born 1983), Uruguayan football referee
- Rubén Umpiérrez (born 1956), Uruguayan footballer
