= Daiane Rodrigues =

Daiane Rodrigues may refer to:

- Daiane Rodrigues (footballer, born 1983)
- Daiane Rodrigues (footballer, born 1986)
