= Fernanda Pinilla =

Chilean footballer (born 1993)

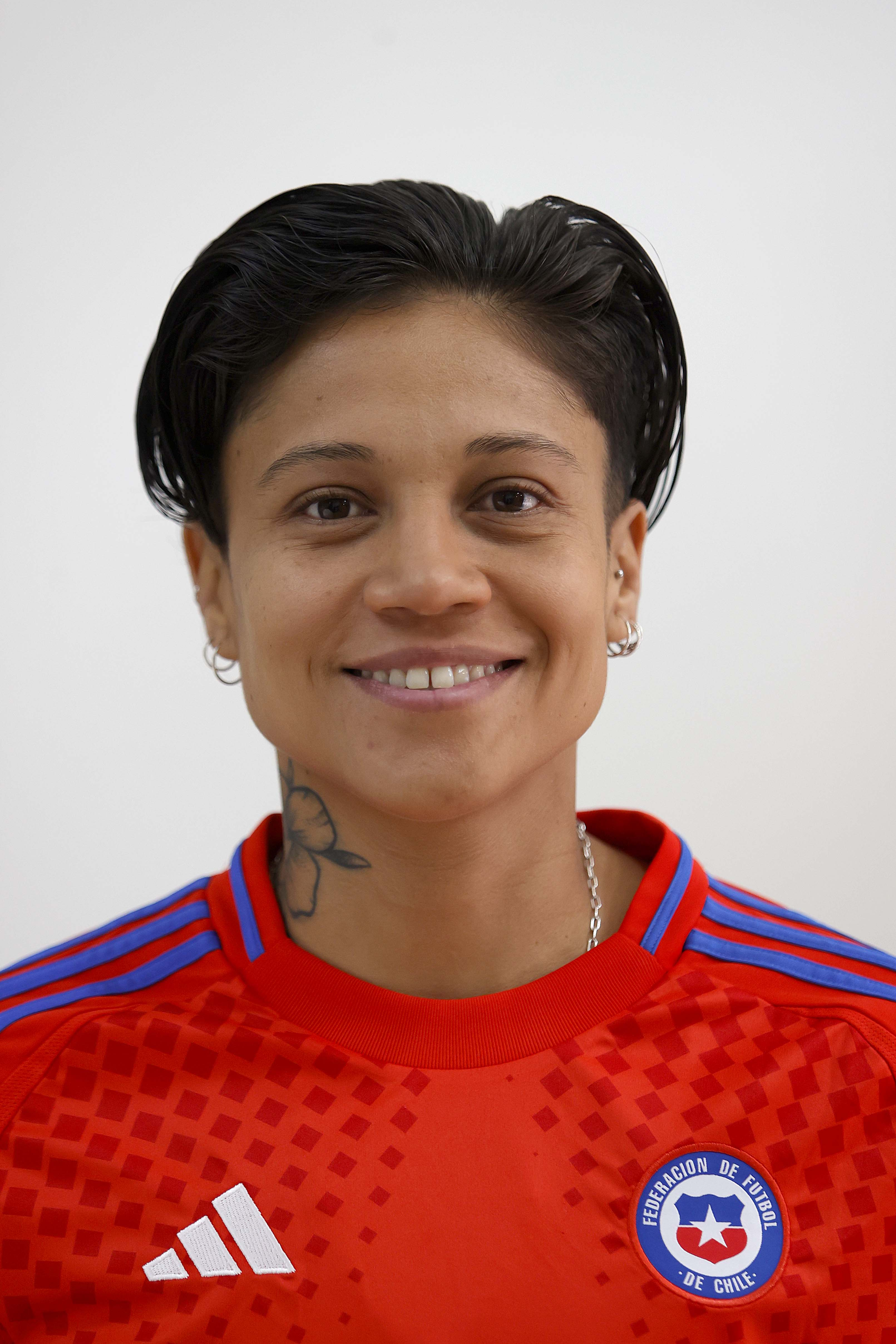
- Pinilla in 2025

Personal information
- Full name: Fernanda Paz Pinilla Roa
- Date of birth: 6 November 1993 (age 33)
- Place of birth: Puente Alto, Santiago, Chile
- Height: 1.67 m (5 ft 6 in)
- Positions: Fullback; centre back; defensive midfielder

Team information
- Current team: León
- Number: 17

Senior career*
Years	Team	Apps	(Gls)
2014–2016	Audax Italiano		
2017–2018	Universidad de Chile		
2018–2019	Córdoba		
2019–2020	Santa Teresa	3	(0)
2020–2023	Universidad de Chile		
2024–	León	66	(3)

International career^{‡}
2010	Chile U17	1	(0)
2017–	Chile	16	(0)
Medal record
Women's football
Representing Chile
Pan American Games
Silver medal – second place	2023 Santiago	Team
South American Games
Silver medal – second place	2014 Santiago	Team
- * Club domestic league appearances and goals as of 9 February 2026 ‡ National team caps and goals as of 14:00, 13 June 2019 (UTC)

Fernanda Paz Pinilla Roa (born 6 November 1993) is a Chilean footballer who plays as a defender for Liga MX Femenil side León and the Chile women's national team.

== Club career ==
On 21 June 2019, Pinilla signed with Spanish Primera División B side Santa Teresa CD.

In 2024, she moved to Mexico and signed with León.

== International career ==
Pinilla represented Chile at the 2010 FIFA U-17 Women's World Cup. She was a last minute replacement for injured Ana Gutiérrez taking her place at the 2019 FIFA Women's World Cup.

She represented Chile at the 2023 Pan American Games, where Chile won the silver medal.

== International goals ==
No.	Date	Venue	Opponent	Score	Result	Competition
1.	25 October 2023	Estadio Sausalito, Viña del Mar, Chile	Mexico	1–0	1–3	2023 Pan American Games
2.	25 October 2024	CHUBB Arena, Quito, Ecuador	Ecuador	1–1	1–1	Friendly
3.	28 October 2025	Estadio El Teniente, Rancagua, Chile	Bolivia	3–0	5–0	2025–26 CONMEBOL Liga de Naciones Femenina

== Personal life ==
She has a BA in Physics at the University of Chile.

In June 2022, Pinilla married Grace Lazcano, a sport journalist working for ESPN Chile at the time. They had a daughter, Elena, on 17 February 2026.

== Political views ==
In 2019, she joined Social Convergence, left-wing political party.

== Honours ==
Universidad de Chile

- Primera División (2): 2016 Apertura, 2021

Chile

- South American Games Silver medal: 2014
- Copa América Runner-up: 2018
- Turkish Women's Cup: 2020
- Pan American Games Silver Medal: 2023

Individual

- Premios FutFem - Best Full-back: 2022
