= Yasmin Cosmann =

Brazilian footballer

Personal information
- Date of birth: 24 July 2001 (age 25)
- Place of birth: Seara, Brazil
- Height: 1.71 m (5 ft 7 in)
- Position: Defender

Team information
- Current team: São Paulo
- Number: 4

Senior career*
Years	Team	Apps	(Gls)
2016–2019	Chapecoense	10	(0)
2019–2020	Grêmio	12	(0)
2020–2023	Ferroviária	32	(2)
2024–2025	Fluminense	35	(1)
2025–	São Paulo	0	(0)

International career
2018	Brazil U17	7	(0)
- * Club domestic league appearances and goals as of 9 August 2025

Yasmin Cosmann (born 24 July 2001) is a Brazilian professional women's footballer who plays as a defender for São Paulo.

== Career ==
Cosmann began her career at Chapecoense in 2016, remaining with the team until 2019 when she transferred to Grêmio. There, she played 12 matches. In 2020, she joined Ferroviária, being part of the squad that won the Copa Libertadores Femenina that year. In 2024, she was signed by Fluminense, where she remained until July 2025, when she was acquired by São Paulo.

In 2018, Cosmann was also part of the Brazil under-17 national team that won South American Championship and competed in FIFA U-17 Women's World Cup.

== Honours ==
Ferroviária

- Copa Libertadores Femenina: 2020

Brazil U17

- South American Under-17 Women's Football Championship: 2018
