= Luana Sartório =

Brazilian footballer (born 1998)

Personal information
- Full name: Luana Sartório Menegardo
- Date of birth: 8 September 1998 (age 28)
- Place of birth: Rio Novo do Sul, Brazil
- Height: 1.66 m (5 ft 5 in)
- Position: Centre-back

Team information
- Current team: Ferroviária
- Number: 4

Youth career
- 2014–2015: Ferroviária

Senior career*
Years	Team	Apps	(Gls)
2015–	Ferroviária	119	(13)

International career
2016–2018	Brazil U20		
- * Club domestic league appearances and goals as of 14:44, 14 February 2024 (UTC)

Luana Sartório Menegardo (born 8 September 1998), known as Luana Sartório or just Luana, is a Brazilian footballer who plays as a centre-back for Ferroviária.

== Club career ==
Luana was born in Rio Novo do Sul, Espírito Santo, and joined Ferroviária's youth setup in 2014, after a trial period. Promoted to the first team in 2015, she became a regular starter afterwards.

On 21 December 2023, already established as a first-choice and team captain, Luana renewed her contract until 2025.

== International career ==
Luana was a part of the Brazil national under-20 team squads in the 2016 and 2018 editions of the FIFA U-20 Women's World Cup, but did not play in either tournament. She also won the 2018 South American U-20 Women's Championship with the nation.

== Honours ==
Ferroviária

- Campeonato Brasileiro de Futebol Feminino Série A1: 2019
- Copa Libertadores Femenina: 2015, 2020
- Copa Paulista de Futebol Feminino: 2023

Brazil U20

- South American U-20 Women's Championship: 2018

Individual

- Bola de Prata: 2023, 2024
