= Lindsay Camila =

Brazilian football manager

Personal information
- Full name: Lindsay Camila Teles de Carvalho
- Date of birth: 27 July 1982 (age 44)
- Place of birth: Campinas, Brazil
- Position: Centre-back

Team information
- Current team: Costa Rica (head coach)

Senior career*
Years	Team	Apps	(Gls)
- Ponte Preta
- Veranópolis
2005–2006	AFC Compiègne B		
2006–2007	Le Puy	1	(0)

Managerial career
- 2007–2010: Lyon (youth)
- 2016–2017: Racing Union U14 (men)
- 2017–2019: Terville (men)
- 2019–2020: Brazil U17 (assistant)
- 2021: Ferroviária
- 2021–2023: Atlético Mineiro
- 2023: Brazil U17 (assistant)
- 2024: Bahia
- 2024–2025: Al-Ittihad
- 2025–: Costa Rica
- * Club domestic league appearances and goals

Lindsay Camila Teles de Carvalho (born 27 July 1982), known as Lindsay Camila or sometimes as just Lindsay, is a Brazilian football coach, currently the head coach of the Costa Rica national team.

== Career ==
Born in Campinas, São Paulo, Lindsay began her career with hometown side Ponte Preta. She subsequently represented Veranópolis before playing in Portugal, Spain and France. In the latter country, she played for AFC Compiègne's B-team and Le Puy before retiring.

After retiring, Lindsay worked at Lyon's youth sides before coaching in Dubai and in the United States. She moved to men's football in 2016, working with the under-14 side of Racing FC Union Luxembourg, before becoming the manager of ninth level side Terville.

After taking Terville to the Régional 3, Lindsay left the club to become Simone Jatobá's assistant at the Brazil women's national under-17 team. On 2 January 2021, she was named head coach of Ferroviária.

Lindsay led the Guerreiras Grenás to the 2021 Copa Libertadores Femenina title, becoming the first women to win the trophy as head coach. On 9 September, however, she resigned after having altercations with some players of the squad, she took over Atlético Mineiro on 6 October.

Lindsay was dismissed by Galo on 28 March 2023, and returned to the Brazilian Football Confederation in July, again as Jatobá's assistant in the under-15 and under-17 squads. On 5 January 2024, she was announced as head coach of Bahia, but left on 7 August, after winning the year's Campeonato Brasileiro de Futebol Feminino Série A2, to take over Al-Ittihad.

After leaving Al-Ittihad in June 2025, Lindsay Camila was announced as the manager for Costa Rica's Women nation team in November 2025.

== Honours ==
=== Club ===
Ferroviária

- Copa Libertadores Femenina: 2020

Atlético Mineiro

- Campeonato Mineiro de Futebol Feminino: 2021, 2022

Bahia

- Campeonato Brasileiro de Futebol Feminino Série A2: 2024
