= Ericka Gracia =

Ecuadorian footballer (born 1989)

Personal information
- Full name: Ericka Elizabeth Gracia Micolta
- Date of birth: 30 July 1989 (age 37)
- Place of birth: Esmeraldas, Ecuador
- Height: 1.80 m (5 ft 11 in)
- Positions: Defender; midfielder

Team information
- Current team: El Nacional

Senior career*
Years	Team	Apps	(Gls)
2013	Esmeraldas selection		
2013–2014	Rocafuerte FC		
2014–2015	Espe		
2015–2019	Unión Española		
2019	Deportivo Cuenca	25	(11)
2020–	El Nacional		

International career^{‡}
2018–	Ecuador	3	(0)
- * Club domestic league appearances and goals as of 28 September 2019 ‡ National team caps and goals as of 27 November 2020

Ericka Elizabeth Gracia Micolta (born 30 July 1989) is an Ecuadorian footballer who plays as a defender for Super Liga Femenina club CD El Nacional and the Ecuador women's national team.

== International career ==
Gracia capped for Ecuador at senior level during the 2018 Copa América Femenina.

== International goals ==
No.	Date	Venue	Opponent	Score	Result	Competition
1.	21 February 2023	Estadio Juan Carlos Durán, Santa Cruz de la Sierra, Bolivia	Bolivia	3–1	5–1	Friendly
