= Nathane =

Brazilian footballer

Personal information
- Full name: Nathane Cadorini Fabem
- Date of birth: 8 August 1990 (age 36)
- Place of birth: São Mateus, Brazil
- Height: 1.72 m (5 ft 8 in)
- Position: Forward

Team information
- Current team: São Paulo

Senior career*
Years	Team	Apps	(Gls)
2009	Iguaçu-MG		
2010	Atlético Mineiro		
2011	Iguaçu-MG		
2011–2012	ASCOOP		
2012	Minas Brasília		
2013–2014	Comercial de Castelo		
2015	Ipatinga		
2015	Projeto SELC		
2016	Iranduba	9	(4)
2017–2018	Flamengo	9	(1)
2019	Ferroviária	17	(7)
2020	Hwacheon KSPO		
2020–2021	Grêmio	16	(2)
2022	Atlético Mineiro	15	(3)
2023	Bahia	15	(7)
2024	Botafogo	15	(4)
2024–2025	Santos	0	(0)
2025–	São Paulo	2	(0)

International career
2013–2017	Brazil (University)		
Medal record
Women's football
Representing Brazil
Summer Universiade
Gold medal – first place	2017 Taipei	Women's
Bronze medal – third place	2013 Kazan	Women's
- * Club domestic league appearances and goals as of 14:37, 18 August 2025 (UTC)

Nathane Cadorini Fabem (born 8 August 1990), known as Nathane or Nath Fabem, is a Brazilian professional footballer who plays as a forward for São Paulo.

== Club career ==
Born in São Mateus, Espírito Santo, Nathane began her career playing futsal in her hometown before impressing with a team from Barra de São Francisco in a tournament in Pindamonhangaba. She then joined Iguaçu-MG, before moving to Atlético Mineiro.

After returning to Iguaçu and being the top scorer of the 2011 Campeonato Mineiro de Futebol Feminino with 28 goals, Nathane joined ASCOOP. She later played for Minas Brasília before returning to her native state, where she represented Comercial de Castelo.

Nathane won the 2015 Mineiro with Ipatinga, and later played for Projeto SELC before being a spotlight of Iranduba in the 2016 season.

On 3 January 2017, Nathane signed for Flamengo. After two years being rarely used, she moved to Ferroviária, where she won the 2019 Campeonato Brasileiro de Futebol Feminino Série A1 and was the top scorer of the 2019 Copa Libertadores Femenina with nine goals.

In January 2020, Nathane moved abroad and joined Korean side Hwacheon KSPO, but had to wait until June to debut due to the COVID-19 pandemic. In November, however, she returned to her home country after being announced at Grêmio.

On 4 January 2022, Nathane returned to Galo. She moved to Bahia for the 2023 campaign, being their top scorer as they suffered relegation before leaving on 5 January 2024.

On 12 January 2024, Nathane agreed to a deal with Botafogo. On 10 September, he signed a contract with Santos until December 2025.

On 4 July 2025, after being separated from the squad during the season, Nathane moved to São Paulo.

== Honours ==
Atlético Mineiro

- Campeonato Mineiro de Futebol Feminino: 2010, 2022

Comercial

- Campeonato Capixaba de Futebol Feminino: 2013, 2014

Ipatinga

- Campeonato Mineiro de Futebol Feminino: 2015

Flamengo

- Campeonato Carioca de Futebol Feminino: 2017, 2018

Ferroviária

- Campeonato Brasileiro de Futebol Feminino Série A1: 2019

Botafogo

- Copa Rio de Futebol Feminino: 2024

Santos

- Copa Paulista de Futebol Feminino: 2024

Brazil (University)

- Summer Universiade: 2017

Individual

- Copa Libertadores Femenina top scorer: 2019 (9 goals)
