= Estadio Nuevo Francisco Urbano =

Football stadium in Morón, Argentina

Nuevo Francisco Urbano Stadium
- Estadio Nuevo Francisco Urbano
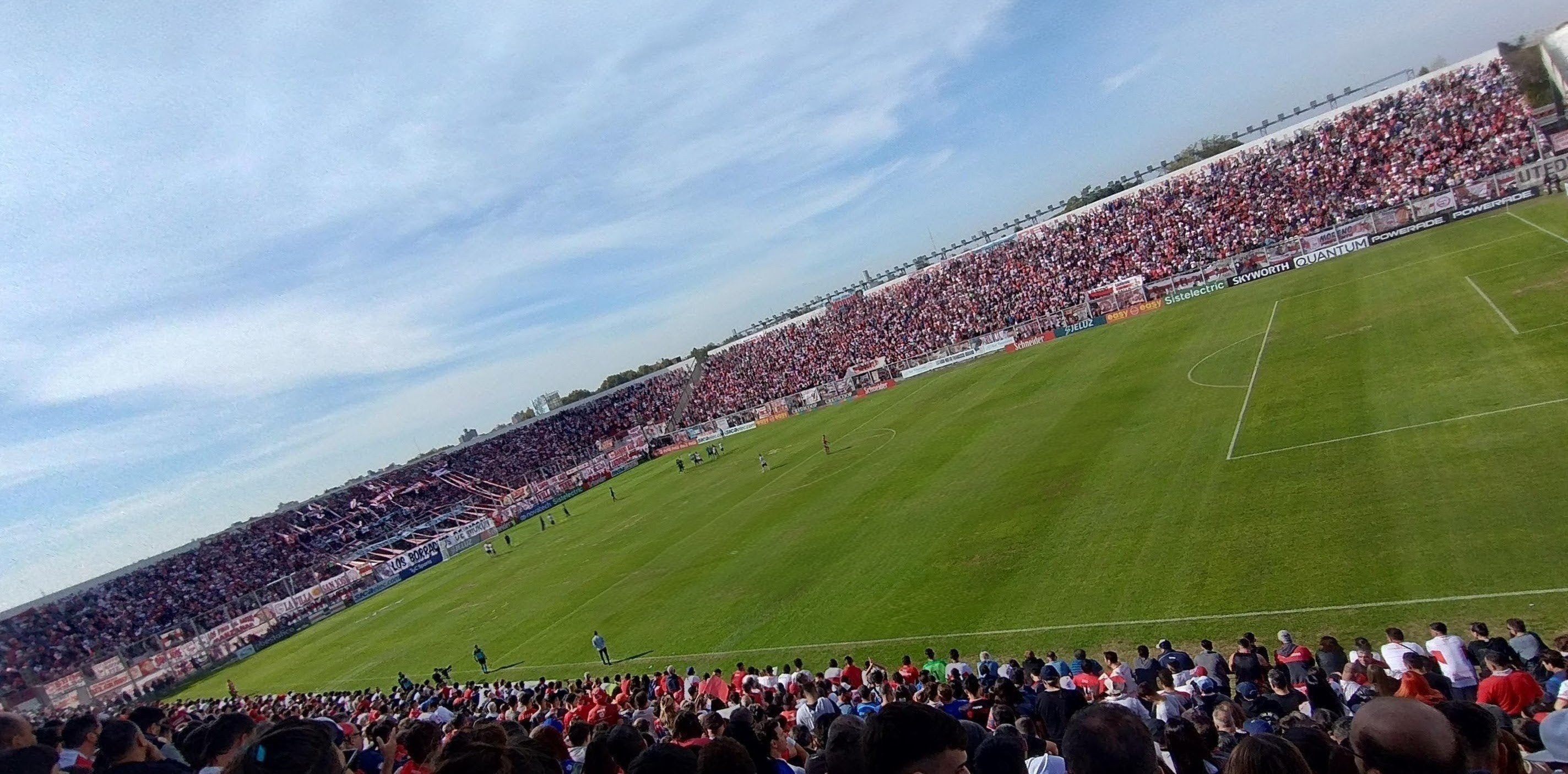
- Interactive map of Nuevo Francisco Urbano Stadium
- Address: Av. Hipólito Yrigoyen 1600; Morón, Buenos Aires; Argentina
- Owner: Deportivo Morón
- Capacity: 32,000
- Type: Stadium
- Surface: Grass
- Field size: 105 x 68 m

Construction
- Built: 2012–13
- Opened: 26 July 2013; 13 years ago
- Architect: Vila Sebastián Studio
- Builder: Grupo Bautec

Tenant
- Deportivo Morón (2013–present)

Estadio Nuevo Francisco Urbano is a football stadium located in the city of Morón in the Buenos Aires Province of Argentina. It is owned and operated by club Deportivo Morón, having been opened in July 2013. It has a capacity of 32,000 people.

The stadium was named in honor of Francisco Urbano, president of the club elected in 1956 and regarded as one of the most notable presidents in the history of the club. The venue replaced the old Deportivo Morón stadium that had been opened in 1956, remodeled in 1960-61 and finally demolished in 2013. Apart from the stadium, the neighborhood where the old venue was located was given the name "Barrio Viejo Urbano" in 2019, after a request from a group of club supporters.

== History ==
The old stadium, inaugurated in 1956, was located on the downtown Morón. The population growth in the area caused that organizing events in the stadium was problematic due to they required security procedures that resulted in blocked streets and traffic congestions because of that.

In 2007 the club approved to move the stadium to a remote area. After a long period of negotiations, the investor group ("Grupo Inversor Morón") signed an agreement with the Municipality and Club Deportivo Morón. The new stadium would be built on Avenida Hipólito Yrigoyen, on a land that had been occupied by "Textil Castelar", a textile factory that operated from 1941 to 1994. The former factory was demolished in 2012, and works began after that. Works were carried out by Grupo Bautec (a corporate group of construction companies) and included 38 new VIP booths for members and press, an indoor arena for 3,450 people, a 800 m2 hotel with 20 rooms, olympic-size swimming pool, parking lots, and auxiliary fields. The estimated invested was AR$600 million.

The stadium was inaugurated on 26 July 2013 in a friendly match between Deportivo Morón and the Argentina u-20, won by El Gallo 2–1. An attendance of 30,000 people watched the match, that lasted only 45 minutes.

== See also ==
- List of football stadiums in Argentina
- Lists of stadiums
