= Madelin Riera =

Ecuadorian footballer (born 1989)

Personal information
- Full name: Madelin Stefanía Riera Bajaña
- Date of birth: 7 August 1989 (age 37)
- Place of birth: Guayaquil, Ecuador
- Height: 1.60 m (5 ft 3 in)
- Positions: Forward; midfielder

Team information
- Current team: Barcelona SC
- Number: 11

Senior career*
Years	Team	Apps	(Gls)
2004–2013	Guayas selection		
2009	→ Deportivo Quito (loan)		
2011	→ LDU Quito (loan)		
2013–2015	Rocafuerte FC	37	(26)
2015–2019	Unión Española	53	(39)
2019-2021	Deportivo Cuenca	67	(59)
2020–2021	El Nacional	14	(20)
2022-	Barcelona S.C.	65	(82)

International career
2015–2021	Ecuador	11	(4)
- * Club domestic league appearances and goals

Madelin Stefanía Riera Bajaña (born 7 August 1989) is an Ecuadorian footballer who plays as a forward for Super Liga Femenina club Barcelona S.C.. She has been a member of the Ecuador women's national team.

== International career ==
Riera was part of the Ecuadorian squad for the 2015 FIFA Women's World Cup.

== International goals ==
No.	Date	Venue	Opponent	Score	Result	Competition
1.	18 February 2023	Estadio Juan Carlos Durán, Santa Cruz de la Sierra, Bolivia	Bolivia	1–0	5–0	Friendly
2.	18 February 2023	Estadio Juan Carlos Durán, Santa Cruz de la Sierra, Bolivia	Bolivia	5–0	5–0	Friendly
3.	21 February 2023	Estadio Juan Carlos Durán, Santa Cruz de la Sierra, Bolivia	Bolivia	1–0	5–1	Friendly
4.	21 February 2023	Estadio Juan Carlos Durán, Santa Cruz de la Sierra, Bolivia	Bolivia	2–1	5–1	Friendly
