= Rita Bove =

Brazilian footballer

Personal information
- Full name: Rita de Cássia Bove
- Date of birth: 8 June 1990 (age 36)
- Place of birth: Flórida Paulista, Brazil
- Height: 1.62 m (5 ft 4 in)
- Position: Midfielder

Team information
- Current team: Cruzeiro

Youth career
- Grêmio Motorola Brasil

Senior career*
Years	Team	Apps	(Gls)
2005–2011	AJA		
2009	→ Saad (loan)		
2012–2013	XV de Piracicaba		
2013	Kindermann-Avaí	2	(0)
2014–2018	São José	37	(12)
2019–2021	Santos	41	(4)
2022–	Cruzeiro	0	(0)

International career^{‡}
2017–	Brazil	1	(0)
- * Club domestic league appearances and goals as of 23:15, 21 December 2021 (UTC) ‡ National team caps and goals as of 4 July 2017

Rita de Cássia Bove (born 8 June 1990) is a Brazilian footballer who plays as a midfielder for Cruzeiro.

== International career ==
Rita Bove made her full international debut for the Brazil women's national team on 4 July 2017, coming on as a late substitute for Francielle in a 1–3 loss against Germany.

== Career statistics ==
=== International ===
As of 17 April 2021

Brazil
Year	Apps	Goals
2017	1	0
Total	1	0

== Honours ==
São José

- Copa Libertadores Femenina: 2014
- Campeonato Paulista de Futebol Feminino: 2014, 2015

Santos

- Copa Paulista: 2020
