= Fernanda Hidalgo =

Chilean footballer (born 1998)

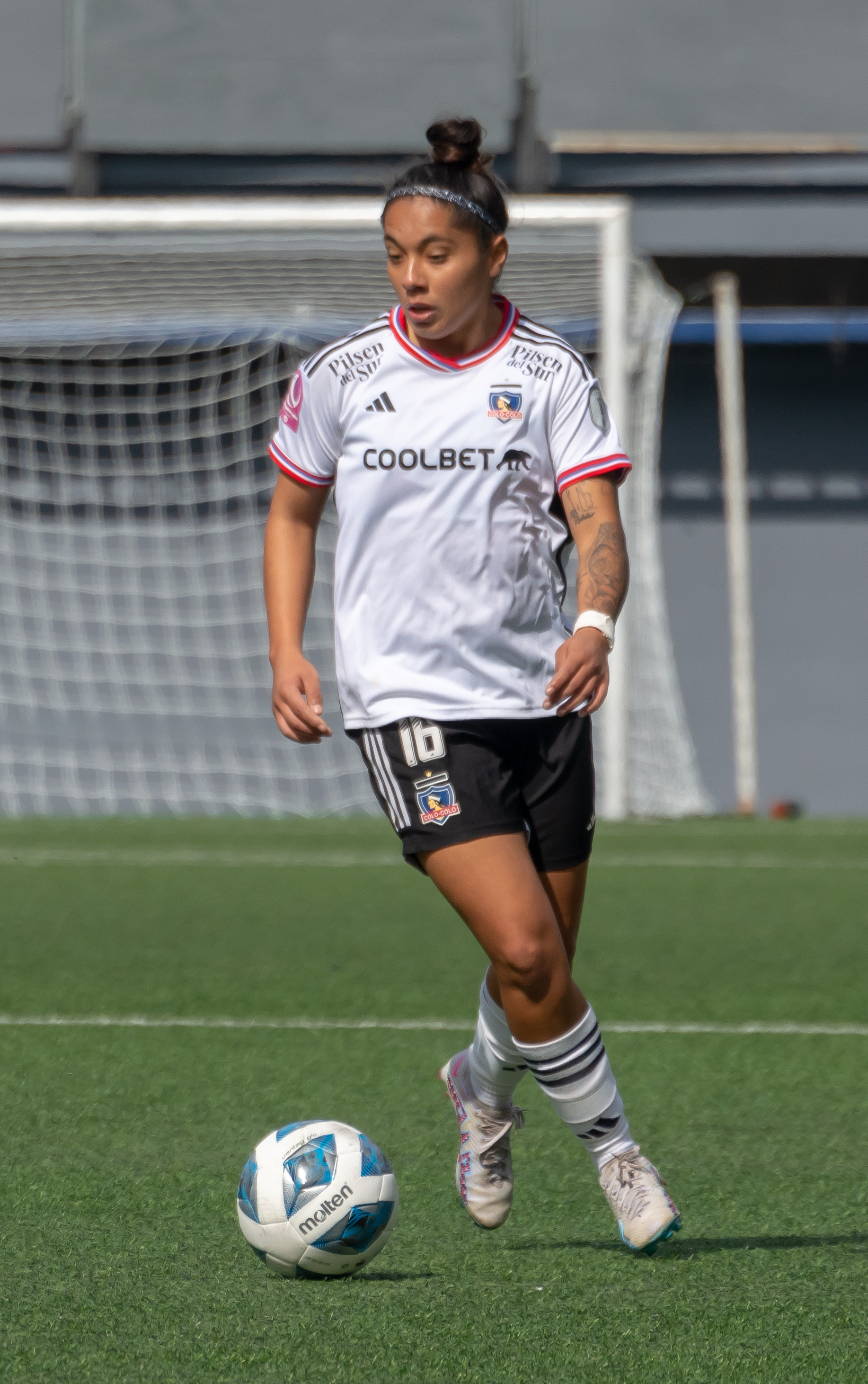
- Hidalgo with Colo-Colo in 2023

Personal information
- Full name: Fernanda Constanza Hidalgo Rubilar
- Date of birth: 4 May 1998 (age 28)
- Place of birth: Santiago, Chile
- Height: 1.58 m (5 ft 2 in)
- Position: Midfielder

Team information
- Current team: Universidad de Concepción

Senior career*
Years	Team	Apps	(Gls)
2016–2025	Colo-Colo		
2026–	Universidad de Concepción		

International career^{‡}
2018	Chile U20		
2019–	Chile	1	(0)
- * Club domestic league appearances and goals ‡ National team caps and goals as of 1 September 2019

Fernanda Constanza Hidalgo Rubilar (born 4 May 1998) is a Chilean footballer who plays as a midfielder for Universidad de Concepción.

== Club career ==
Hidalgo left Colo-Colo at the end of the 2025 season.

On 3 January 2026, Hidalgo signed with Universidad de Concepción.

== International career ==
At under-20 level, she was part of the Chile squad at the 2018 South American Games.

Hidalgo made her senior debut for Chile on 1 September 2019 in a 0–0 friendly draw against Brazil (won by Chile through the penalty shoot-out).
