= Rio Novo do Sul =

Municipality in Espírito Santo, Brazil

- Municipality of Espírito Santo, Brazil
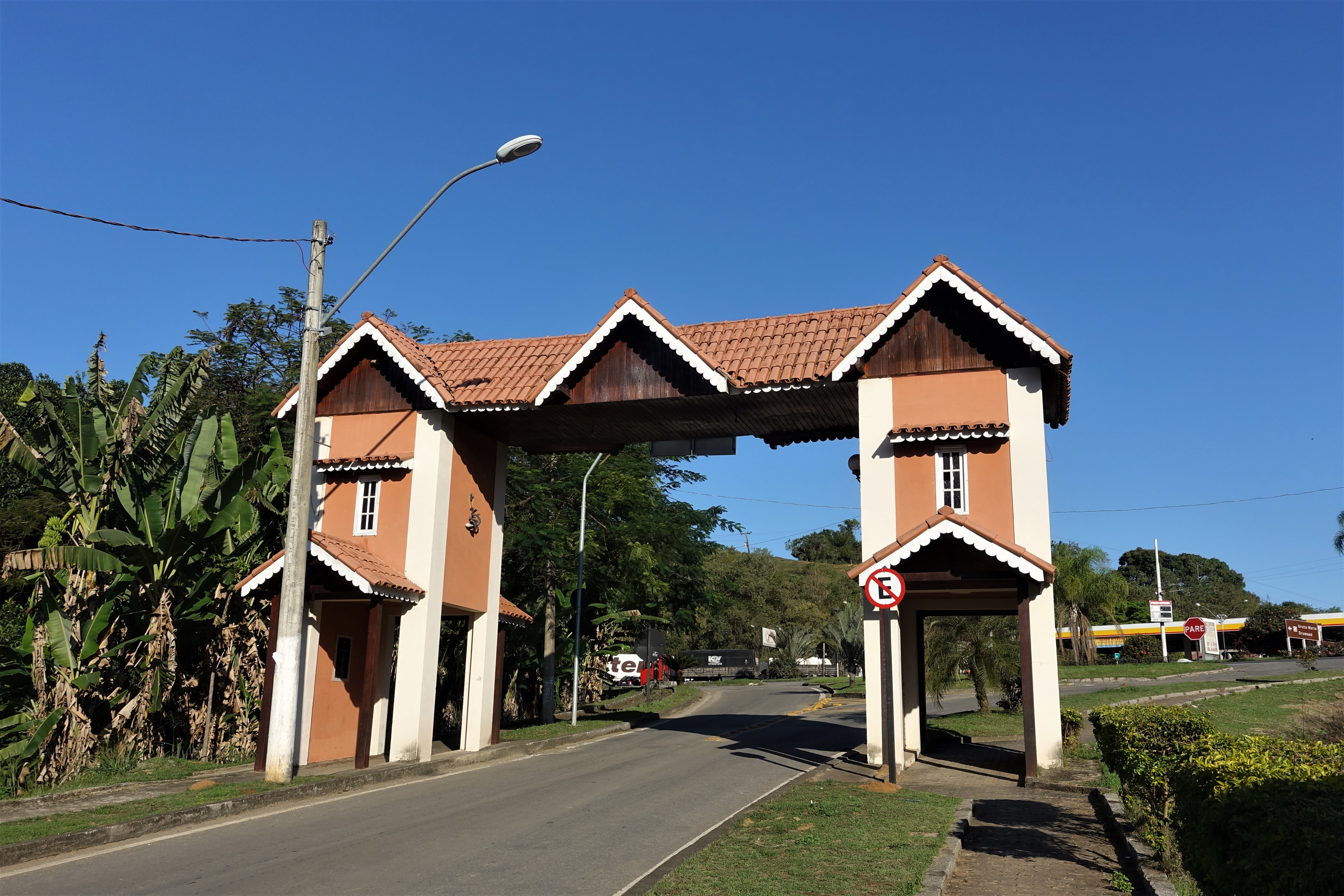
- Entrance to the city

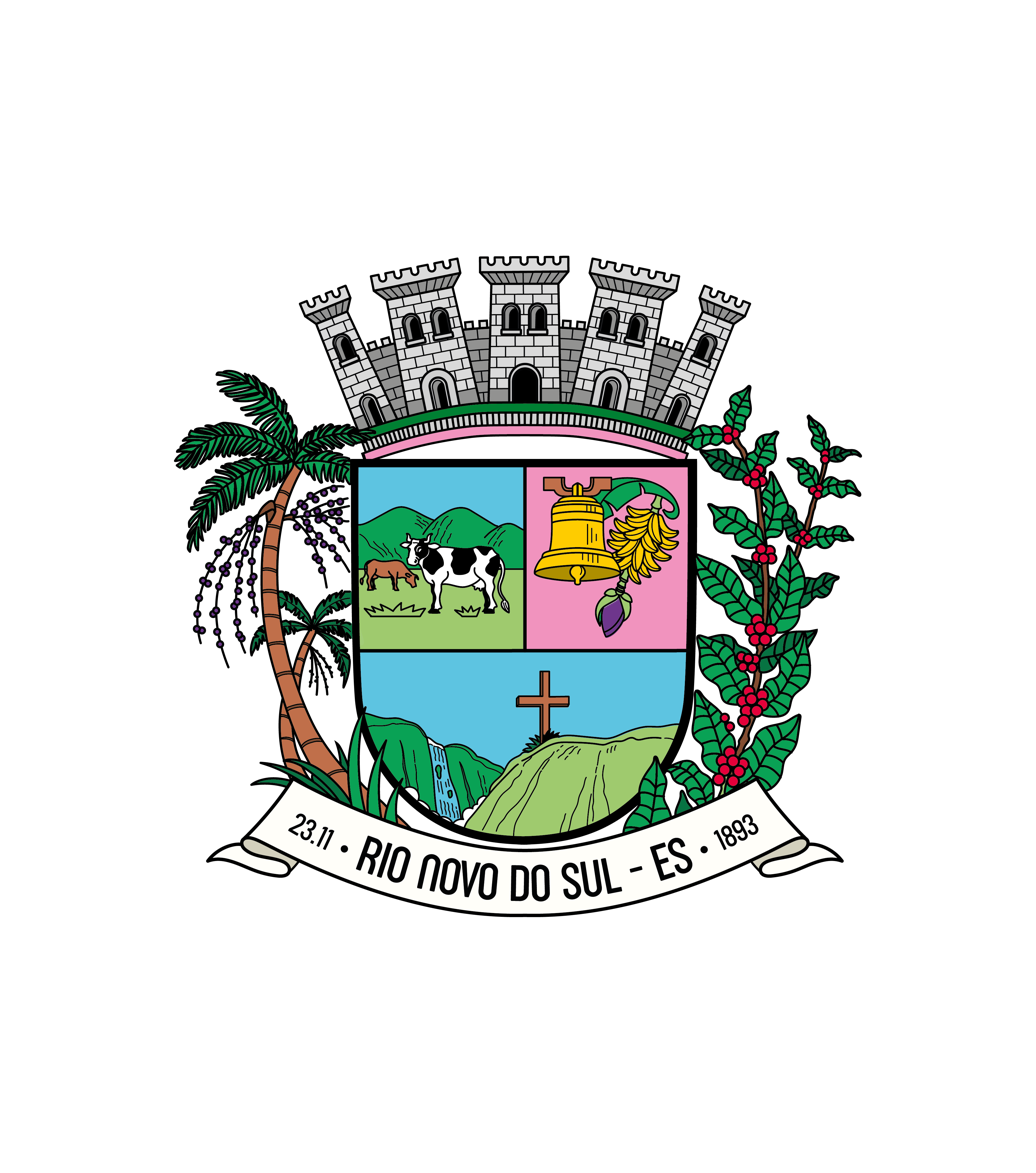
- Flag Coat of arms
- Etymology: Means in Brazilian Portuguese "New River of the South", referring to the river that forms the municipal boundary in the south and southeast
- Location of Rio Novo do Sul in Espírito Santo

- Location within Brazil Location within South America
- Coordinates: 20°51′46″S 40°56′9″W
- Country: Brazil
- Region: Southeast
- State: Espírito Santo
- Founded: 23 November 1893

Government
  - Mayor: Jocenei Marconcini Castelari (PODE) (2025-2028)
  - Vice Mayor: Jocelino Monti Cole (MDB) (2025-2028)

Area
  - Total: 204.464 km^{2} (78.944 sq mi)
- Elevation: 60 m (200 ft)

Population (2022)
  - Total: 11,069
  - Density: 54.14/km^{2} (140.2/sq mi)
- Demonym: Novense-do-sul (Brazilian Portuguese)
- Time zone: UTC-03:00 (Brasília Time)
- Postal code: 29290-000, 29293-000
- HDI (2010): 0.711 – high
- Website: rionovodosul.es.gov.br

Rio Novo do Sul is a municipality located in the Brazilian state of Espírito Santo. Its population was 11,626 (2020) and its area is 204 km^{2} (79 sq mi). The name of this municipality means "New River of the South" in Portuguese.

== See also ==
- List of municipalities in Espírito Santo
