= Rubén Umpiérrez =

Uruguayan footballer (born 1956)

Personal information
- Date of birth: 25 October 1956 (age 70)
- Place of birth: Uruguay
- Position: Midfielder

Senior career*
Years	Team	Apps	(Gls)
- CA Cerro
1978–1985	AS Nancy	230	(62)
1985–1989	Racing Paris	120	(13)
1989–1991	US Créteil-Lusitanos	64	(7)

Managerial career
- 1989: US Créteil-Lusitanos
- * Club domestic league appearances and goals

Rubén Umpiérrez (born 25 October 1956) is an Uruguayan footballer who played for CA Cerro in Uruguay, and AS Nancy, Racing Paris and US Créteil-Lusitanos in France. He won the Etoile d'Or award for most regular player of the season in 1984–85.

Umpierrez also enjoyed a short spell as a manager with US Créteil-Lusitanos in 1989.

He is the uncle of referee Claudia Umpiérrez.
