= Claudia Umpiérrez =

Uruguayan association football referee and lawyer

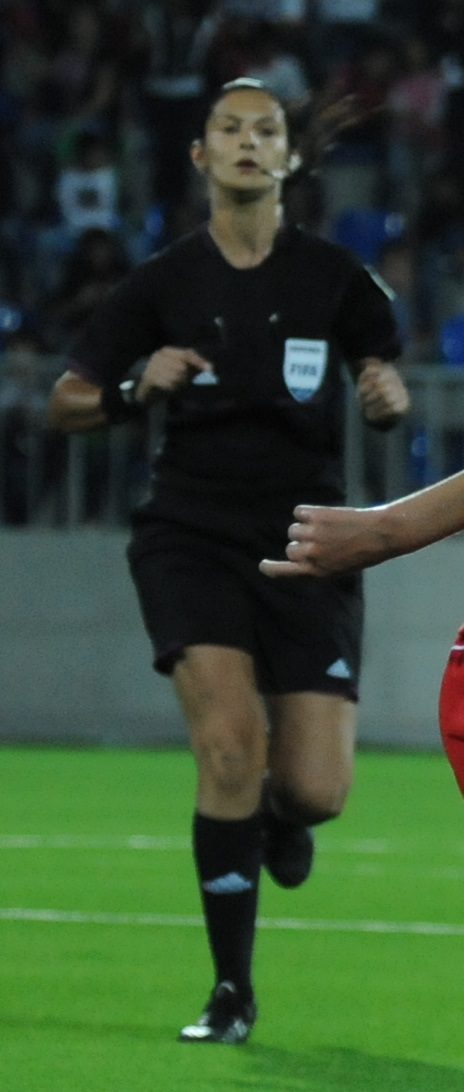
- Full name: Claudia Inés Umpiérrez Rodríguez
- Born: 6 January 1983 (age 43); Pan de Azúcar, Uruguay
- Other occupation: Lawyer

Domestic
Years	League	Role
2016	Uruguayan Second Division	Referee
2016	Uruguayan First Division	Referee

International
Years	League	Role
2010	FIFA listed	Referee

Claudia Inés Umpiérrez Rodríguez (born 6 January 1983), best known only as Claudia Umpiérrez, is a Uruguayan association football referee and lawyer by profession.

She has worked in FIFA international competition since 2010. She has been a first category referee (Note: The first category of referees involves the power to officiate First Division and Second Division matches in Uruguay.) in Uruguay since 2016. On 4 September of that year she became the first woman in the history of Uruguayan football to referee a match in the First Division.

Due to her good performances in 2015 and 2016, she was included in the yearly list of best referees in the world by the International Federation of Football History & Statistics (IFFHS).

She is the niece of former Uruguayan international Rubén Umpiérrez.

== Career ==
=== Early life ===
As a child, Claudia Umpiérrez played football in her hometown, Pan de Azúcar. She was born into a football family, since her father is a coach, her maternal grandfather was a referee, and her uncle was a professional player who excelled in France, Rubén "Pico" Umpiérrez.

When she was 16, her aunt took a course to be a referee. Claudia was enthusiastic and wanted to register, but as a minor she could not. When she turned 18 and moved to Montevideo to study law, she heard on the news that enrollment to the referee school was open.

On her decision to get involved in the world of football, Umpiérrez recalls:

My father did not like it. He is a coach and sees everything from another role. He knows that they insult referees. He gets angry and yells anything at them. I said: "Dad, think I can be myself." They saw that I liked it; they supported me.

In 2002, the refereeing course was opened. Claudia signed up and managed to complete it in 2004. She finished her university career and received her law degree. During the following years, she practiced both professions.

=== Beginnings as international referee ===
At the end of 2009, Umpiérrez was approved as a FIFA international referee. She was also promoted from the third to the second category by the Referees' Association of Uruguay, (Note: The second category of referees involves the power to officiate matches of the Second Amateur Division, Third Division, Under-19, and Women's football in Uruguay.) with the best score of all her colleagues, both men and women. In the following year she took part in her first international competition, being called to officiate in the South American U-17 Women's Championship. She debuted at the international level on 31 January 2010 as the referee of the match between Brazil and Bolivia. Then on 6 February she refereed the last match of Group A – Paraguay against Bolivia. Due to good performance, she was selected to be the referee of the third place match, on 11 February in São Paulo, between Paraguay and Venezuela.

At the end of March 2010, she was the designated referee of a Third Division match between Peñarol and Defensor Sporting at the Estadio Centenario. As part of the celebrations of Women's Month, this was the first time four women officiated a match in the main stadium of the country. However they were forced by the Referees' Association to wear men's shorts rather than skirt pants.

Umpiérrez was selected as referee for the 2010 Copa Libertadores Femenina. She debuted in the official international club competition on 4 October 2010, as the referee in the Everton-UPI match. On 10 October, she refereed the match between Everton and Deportivo Florida. Due to the skill she demonstrated, she was placed in charge of the third place match between Boca Juniors and Deportivo Quito.

For the 2012 South American U-17 Women's Championship, she was included among the competition's officials. On 9 March 2012, at the opening of Group B, when Brazil and Paraguay faced each other, Umpiérrez was the referee. Then she officiated on 13 March, when Venezuela faced Brazil. Due to the fact that the Uruguay national U-17 team qualified for the final stages, Umpiérrez was ineligible due to her Uruguayan nationality.

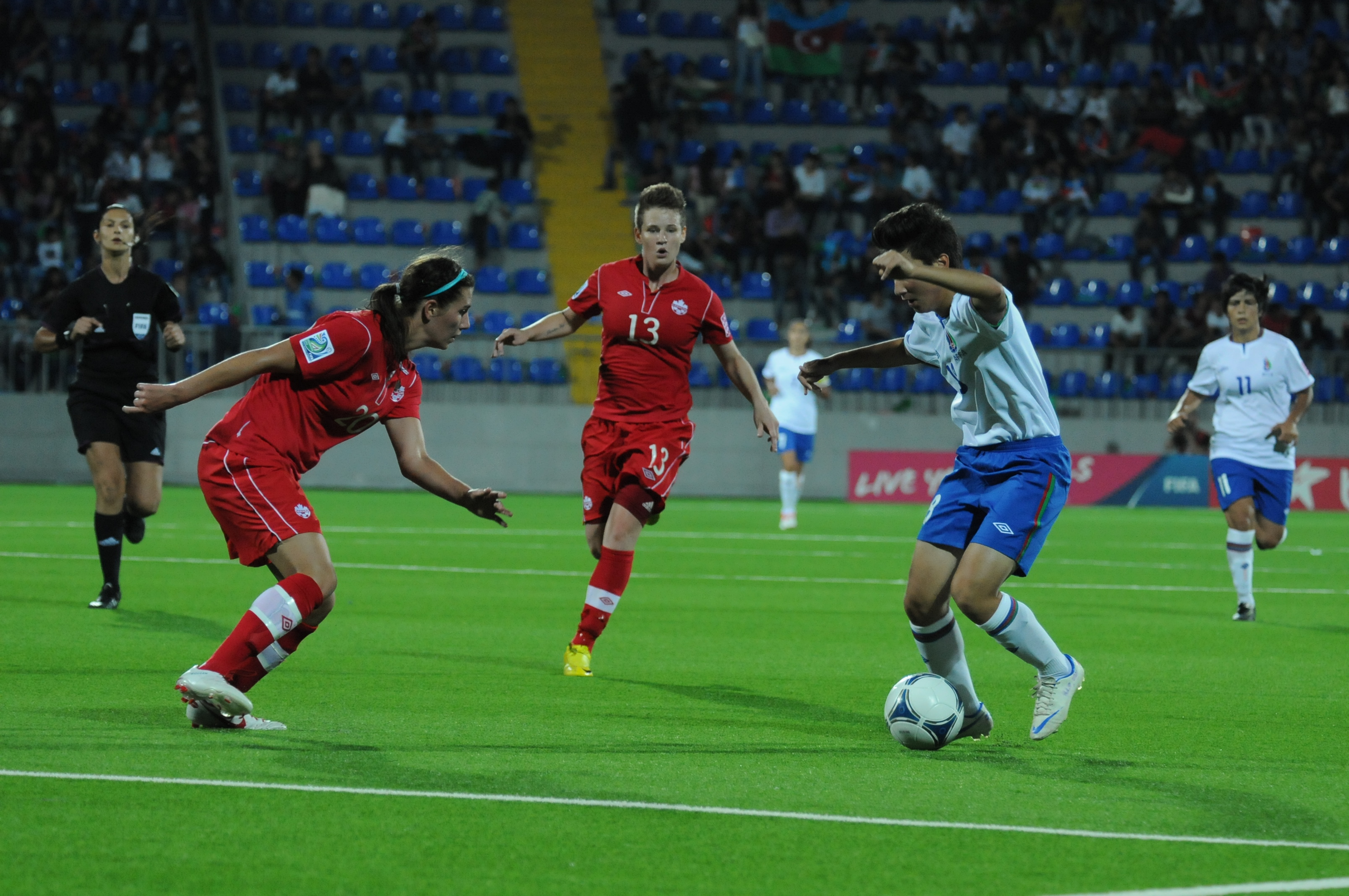
Umpiérrez (left) at the 2012 U-17 Women's World Cup

She was selected as a referee for the 2012 FIFA U-17 Women's World Cup in Azerbaijan. She made her world debut in an official competition on 22 September 2012, as the referee in the opening game of the World Cup between France and the United States. She issued two yellow cards and the match ended in a scoreless draw. She then led the last game of Group A, between Canada and Azerbaijan. She gave one yellow card and the Canadians won 1–0. Due to her good performances, she was assigned to a semifinal, played on 9 October between North Korea and Germany. Umpiérrez showed one yellow card throughout the match and the North Koreans won 2–1. She finished the U-17 World Cup with three appearances as referee, and two as fourth official.

After a successful 2012, Umpiérrez passed a physical test, but was in fourth place at the end of the year among second category referees. As there were places for three promotions to the first category, she did not achieve the big jump.

On 6 March 2013, she was recognized by the Minister of Tourism and Sport, Liliam Kechichián, as one of the pioneers representing the country in international women's refereeing.

For the 2014 FIFA U-20 Women's World Cup, which was held in Canada, she was left as a reserve for the Argentine referee, so she could not take part in the world championship. Claudia was not in top physical condition, because at the beginning of the year she became a mother for the first time.

In March of the following year, Umpiérrez was in the Algarve Cup, as a form of preparation and evaluation for the Women's World Cup. On 4 March 2015, she was referee of the opening match of the international friendly tournament for women's teams, played between Japan and Denmark. She gave two yellow cards and Denmark won 2–1. On 9 March she refereed the match between Norway and Switzerland. She gave four yellow cards, and the match finished 2-2. She was present as the fourth official at the final between France and the United States.

She was selected as the referee for the Women's World Cup in 2015, which took place in Canada. Her official World Cup debut took place on 8 June 2015, at Winnipeg Stadium before more than 31,000 people. As the referee of the match between United States and Australia, she issued three yellow cards and the USA won 3–1. She was the referee again on 16 June, the last date of Group C. She gave five yellow cards in Cameroon's 2–1 victory over Switzerland. She was appointed to referee the quarterfinal match, between England and Canada, played on 24 June before more than 54,000 spectators at BC Place in Vancouver. Umpiérrez gave two yellows and England won 2–1. In addition, Claudia was twice the fourth official, once in the World Cup Final, a match in which the United States defeated Japan 5-2 and won the title.

On being present at the final, Umpiérrez recalled:

I could not believe it, I thought about everything we had trained for and about my family. Then when we went out to the pitch the Spanish assistant told me: "Clau, do not laugh anymore." I was really happy; it was not like I was pretending; actually at some point in the championship, in a return I had been told I was very serious.

After her World Cup experience, she returned to Uruguay and her work had a media impact, which left women well positioned.

On 24 September, she received recognition from the executive board of Women's Football of the Uruguayan Football Association (AUF), for her international performance as a referee.

=== The first professional woman referee of Uruguay ===
Claudia Umpiérrez passed the men's physical test, with the possibility of ascending from the second category of referees to the first, and this was approved.

On 29 September 2015, she officiated two professional men's teams for the first time. It was the first match of the Suat Cup for the Miramar Misiones centenary, between Cerro Largo and Boston River.

She was designated as an official for the 2015 Copa Libertadores Femenina that was held in Colombia. Umpiérrez officiated in three matches, including the semifinal between Colo-Colo and UAI Urquiza.

She refereed an international friendly on 28 November, which was played at Pacaembu Stadium in São Paulo, between the national teams of Brazil and New Zealand. She did not need to issue any cards in the 1-0 New Zealand victory.

She achieved promotion to the first category on 30 December. The Referees' Association evaluated Claudia's record for the year and placed her in the highest category of referees in Uruguay. She was the first woman in history to be eligible to lead professional First and Second Division matches. Before this women had only worked as assistants.

On 7 January 2016, she was recognized by the IFFHS as one of the best referees in the world in 2015, ranked 10th. She became the first South American to appear in the top 10 of the four editions that were held, with 12 points.

She was assigned as the fourth official for the third place match of the 2016 Suat Cup. On 15 January she was present at the third place match of the Summer Cup; she was the fourth official of the match between Argentinos Juniors and Defensor Sporting at Estadio Luis Franzini, which Defensor won 1–0.

On the first day of the Uruguayan championships, Umpiérrez was an adviser of youth matches. The next day, she was designated to be the fourth official in a First Division match, between Plaza Colonia and Liverpool, as well as an adviser in the matches of El Tanque Sisley against Peñarol, of the Third and First Division. For the third day, she was again the fourth official of a First Division match, between Rentistas and Cerro. She was also a consultant for the meetings between Liverpool and Juventud, both in the First and Third Division, during the week she advised on youth.

On 24 February, she was designated by the Referees' Association to be a referee on the first day of the second round of the Second Division, in a match between Central Español and Tacuarembó.

On 1 March it was announced that the president of Peñarol, Juan Pedro Damiani, would invite Umpiérrez for the inaugural match of the club's stadium, in recognition of Women's Month.

She made history on 5 March 2016, becoming the first woman to lead an official professional match in Uruguay. She officiated in Parque Palermo before some 400 people, in a meeting between Central Español and Tacuarembó on the first day of the second round of the Second Division. At 33 years and 59 days old, Umpiérrez said of her first official professional experience:

I felt good, very happy. I had a nice reception from the players; they cooperated at all times, so content and happy to have already passed the 90 minutes.

Her second match, refereeing on 19 March, was between Torque and Cerro Largo at Estadio José Nasazzi. She issued seven yellow cards and one red.

On 28 March, she was the fourth official of the inaugural match of the Estadio Campeón del Siglo, between Peñarol and River Plate, a match that ended 4–1 in favor of los carboneros.

At the end of April, she traveled to Miami to attend a FIFA seminar and a physical test. She passed the test and was designated as an official for the 2016 Summer Olympics in the women's football championship.

She debuted at the 2016 Summer Olympics on 6 August, refereeing the US-France clash in the group stage. She gave one yellow card to each team, and the Americans won 1–0. Then she had another chance, on 12 August, in the quarterfinals. She refereed the match between Canada and France, which ended 1–0 in favor of the Canadians. In all, she served as the central referee twice, and once as the fourth official in the 2016 Rio de Janeiro Olympics.

On 31 August she was selected by the Referees' Association to lead a First Division match in Uruguay for the first time.

History was made on 4 September 2016, when for the first time a woman was the central referee of a Uruguayan First Division match. Claudia Umpiérrez oversaw the match between River Plate and Boston River at Estadio Saroldi.

On 26 December, she was recognized for the second consecutive year by the IFFHS as one of the best referees in the world, this time ranked 11th.

=== 2019 Women's World Cup ===
She was selected as one of the referees for the 2019 FIFA Women's World Cup, and had the honour of being selected to referee the opening match of the tournament. After the conclusion of the round of 16, Umpiérrez was selected as one of 11 officials to be assigned matches for the remaining matches of the tournament.

== Statistics ==
Claudia Umpiérrez has refereed in the following competitions:

- 2010 South American Under-17 Women's Football Championship
- 2010 Copa Libertadores Femenina
- 2012 South American Under-17 Women's Football Championship
- 2012 FIFA U-17 Women's World Cup
- 2015 Algarve Cup
- 2015 FIFA Women's World Cup
- 2015 Suat Cup
- 2015 Copa Libertadores Femenina
- 2015–16 Uruguayan Second Division
- 2016 Summer Olympics
- 2016 Uruguayan First Division

Details of international matches
#	Teams	Result	Date	Location	Competition	Yellow card	Double yellow card	Red card	Penalties	Ref.
1	Japan vs. Denmark	1-2 (1-1)	4 March 2015	Parchal; Portugal	2015 Algarve Cup; Friendly	2	0	0	0	
2	Norway vs. Switzerland	2-2 (0-0)	9 March 2015	Albufeira; Portugal	2015 Algarve Cup; Friendly	4	0	0	0	
3	United States vs. Australia	3-1 (1-1)	8 June 2015	Winnipeg; Canada	Group stage 2015 Women's World Cup	2	0	0	0	
4	Switzerland vs. Cameroon	1-2 (1-0)	16 June 2015	Edmonton; Canada	Group stage 2015 Women's World Cup	5	0	0	0	
5	England vs. Canada	2-1 (2-1)	27 June 2015	Vancouver; Canada	Quarterfinal; 2015 Women's World Cup	2	0	0	0	
6	Brazil vs. New Zealand	0-1 (0-1)	28 November 2015	São Paulo; Brazil	Friendly	0	0	0	0	
7	United States vs. France	1-0 (0-0)	6 August 2016	Belo Horizonte; Brazil	Group stage 2016 Summer Olympics	2	0	0	0	
8	Canada vs. France	1-0 (0-0)	12 August 2016	São Paulo; Brazil	Quarterfinal; 2016 Summer Olympics	4	0	0	0	

== Personal life ==
When Claudia Umpiérrez began her career as a referee in 2002, she met Gabriel Popovits, a second-year student in the same field. At that time they were both married, so they became friends. But some time later, both having divorced, they met again, this time as practicing referees. The love between them flourished, and they later married. On 26 January 2014, their first daughter, Naomi, was born. Motherhood did not prevent Claudia from continuing her passion, officiating.

Umpiérrez acknowledged that the insults she received as an referee in the youth divisions were mostly from women. She also said that she found matches in the Second Amateur Division to be the most difficult to direct, since they mostly involved professional players.

She currently works at Banco de Seguros del Estado, and occasionally practices as a private attorney.

== Honors ==
- 2015, named one of the best referees of the year by IFFHS (10th place)
- 2016, Exceptional Sportsman of the Departmental Board of Montevideo
- 2016, named one of the best referees of the year by IFFHS (11th place)
