= Paula Ugarte =

Argentine footballer (born 1987)

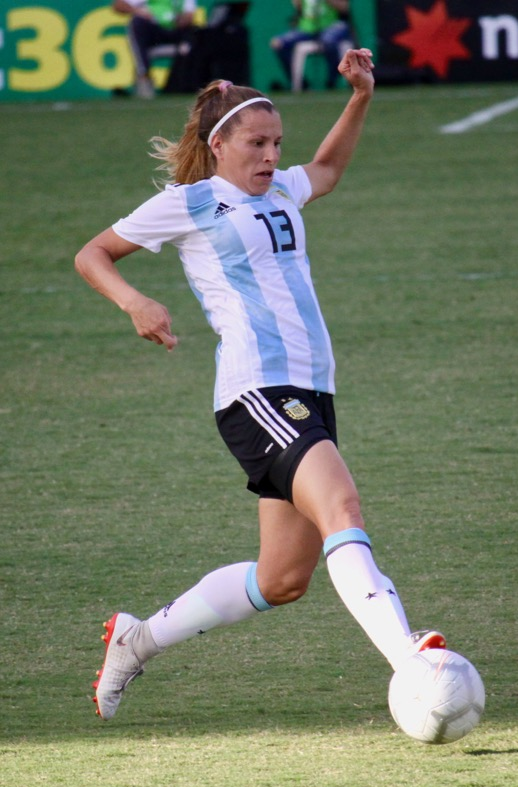
- Ugarte in 2019

Personal information
- Full name: Paula Daniela Ugarte
- Date of birth: 10 January 1987 (age 39)
- Place of birth: Argentina
- Height: 1.67 m (5 ft 5 1/2 in)
- Position: Centre-forward

Team information
- Current team: Maccabi Kishronot Hadera

Senior career*
Years	Team	Apps	(Gls)
2010–2015	UAI Urquiza		
2016	Ferroviária	9	(6)
2016–2017	Hapoel Petah Tikva	24	(16)
2017	Győri ETO	11	(4)
2018–?	UAI Urquiza	6	(14)
2023–	San Lorenzo de Almagro		

International career^{‡}
2019–	Argentina	1	(0)
- * Club domestic league appearances and goals as of 16 February 2019 ‡ National team caps and goals as of 28 February 2019

Paula Daniela Ugarte (born 10 January 1987) is an Argentine footballer who plays as a forward for San Lorenzo de Almagro and the Argentina women's national team.
