= Daiane Rodrigues (footballer, born 1986) =

Brazilian association football player

Personal information
- Full name: Daiane Rodrigues
- Date of birth: 22 July 1986 (age 40)
- Place of birth: São Carlos, Brazil
- Height: 1.62 m (5 ft 4 in)
- Positions: Right back; right wing-back

Team information
- Current team: Ferroviária

Youth career
- ASF São Carlos

Senior career*
Years	Team	Apps	(Gls)
2001–2004	Extra/Fundesport		
2007–2008	Francana		
2009–2010	Ferroviária		
2011–2012	Francana		
2014–2016	Ferroviária	29	(6)
2017	Corinthians/Audax	7	(1)
2018	Sport Club Internacional		
2018–2020	Benfica	13	(9)
2020–	Ferroviária		

International career^{‡}
2017–	Brazil	2	(0)
- * Club domestic league appearances and goals as of 26 January 2019 ‡ National team caps and goals as of 18:19, 24 December 2018 (UTC)

Daiane Rodrigues (born 22 July 1986) is a Brazilian professional footballer who plays as a defender for Ferroviária and the Brazil women's national team.

== Club career ==
Rodrigues joined Ferroviária for a third spell in 2013 and was appointed captain of the team. She led the "Guerreiras Grenás" to the 2014 Copa do Brasil de Futebol Feminino and 2015 Copa Libertadores Femenina titles.

In January 2018, Rodrigues was announced as the second ever signing for S.L. Benfica's newly formed women's football team, following her compatriot Dani Neuhaus.

== International career ==
As an unattached player at club level Rodrigues was part of the Brazil under-20 selection at the FIFA U-20 Women's World Cup in 2006. She was named to the tournament All-Star Team. In March 2012, national coach Jorge Barcellos named Rodrigues in a 33-player preliminary Brazil squad for the London 2012 Olympics.

Alongside four other uncapped players, Vadão called up 31-year-old Rodrigues for two friendlies against Chile in November 2017. She made substitute appearances in both games to win her first senior caps for Brazil.

== Honours ==
Benfica

- Campeonato Nacional II Divisão Feminino: 2018–19
- Taça de Portugal: 2018–19
- Taça da Liga: 2019–20
- Supertaça de Portugal: 2019
