= Lourdes Viana =

Uruguayan footballer (born 1990)

Personal information
- Full name: María de Lourdes Viana Posadas
- Date of birth: 10 February 1990 (age 36)
- Place of birth: Uruguay
- Height: 1.54 m (5 ft 1/2 in)
- Positions: Forward; midfielder

Team information
- Current team: Peñarol
- Number: 10

Senior career*
Years	Team	Apps	(Gls)
2007-2014	Cerro		
2014-2015	Colón		
2016-	Peñarol		

International career^{‡}
2014–	Uruguay	4	(2)
- * Club domestic league appearances and goals ‡ National team caps and goals as of 25 May 2025

María de Lourdes Viana Posadas (born 10 February 1990), known as Lourdes Viana, is a Uruguayan footballer who plays as a forward for Peñarol and the Uruguay women's national team.

== International career ==
Silvera capped for Uruguay during the 2014 Copa América Femenina.

=== International goals ===
Scores and results list Uruguay's goal tally first

No.	Date	Venue	Opponent	Score	Result	Competition
1	11 September 2014	Estadio Olímpico de Riobamba, Riobamba, Ecuador	Venezuela	1–2	1–3	2014 Copa América Femenina
