= Ecuadorian Football Federation =

Sports governing body

CONMEBOL
- Founded: 1925; 101 years ago (as Federación Deportiva Nacional del Ecuador)
- Headquarters: Quito
- FIFA affiliation: 1926
- CONMEBOL affiliation: 1927
- President: Francisco Egas Larreátegui
- Website: www.fef.ec

The Ecuadorian Football Federation (Spanish: Federación Ecuatoriana de Fútbol or FEF) is the governing body of football in Ecuador. Its headquarters are in Quito, and it organizes the country's various football competitions and oversees the Ecuador national team.

== History ==
Numerous amateur federations sprouted in the provinces with the largest cities, being Quito, and Guayaquil. Seeking to unify and compete against each federation, the Football Federation was created on May 30, 1925, known as Association of Ecuadorian Football. In 1926, the federation hosted its first organized competition the Riobamba Olimpic, and became FIFA affiliated. In 1927 it formally joined CONMEBOL, but debuted in competition in 1939 in the South American Championship.

In the 1940s the FEF, hosted the first amateur competitions of each provincial selective nationwide. By the 1950s Guayas, and Pichincha, left behind amateur, and became professional 1951, and 1953 respectively. By 1957, now ready the FEF began to host professional club competitions nationwide. With the rise of the club competition, Guayas, and Pichinca ended their individual competitions and associate with the FEF, formally creating the Association of Ecuadorian Football. In 1978, its name was changed to the Ecuador Football Federation (F.E.F). With the exception of two years, and after the Football Federation of Ecuador, has hosted nationwide club tournaments every year uninterrupted.

=== Women's ===
The counterpart to the male football profession the female, has had twice the adversary as the male version. Mainly the effort to collect the present talent has been missing, as well as economic incentive, and along with the rest of the world sexism. The FEF began the female complement of the national team in 1995, with its debut in the South American Women's Football Championship in 1995. In 1996 the first initiatives were taken to encourage women to play football competitively, when neighborhood leagues began to require teams to inscribe a female team as well.

By 2005, the club tournaments was proposed and approved, however in 2006 an unorganized last minute put together, provincial selective tournament was held. With the impulse from the current government's Ministry of Sports who will contribute with 200 thousand for travel, hospitality etc. of each match, the FEF has begun the national women's club competition amateur in 2013 organized by the Comisión de Fútbol Amateur (COMFA) (Commission of Amateur Football). The tournament began with an initial 16 participating teams with only two being professional. In 2014 the tournament turns professional with the addition of 12 more teams, the previous last four being relegated to the new Serie B, along with the new teams included.

=== Association staff ===
Name	Position	Source
(Ecuador) Francisco Egas Larreátegui	President	
(Ecuador) Carlos Manzur	Vice President	
(Ecuador) Nicolas Solines	General Secretary	
(Ecuador) Marisol Corral	Treasurer	
n/a	Technical Director	
(Argentina) Sebastián Beccacece	Team Coach (Men's)	
(Ecuador) Eduardo Corrroso	Team Coach (Women's)	
(Ecuador) Cinthya Baratau	Media/Communications Manager	
(Argentina) Nestor Pintana	Chairperson of the Referees Committee	
(Ecuador) Oswaldo Segura	Head/Director of the Referees Department	
(Ecuador) Dimas Palma	Futsal Coordinator	
(Ecuador) Luis Vera	Referee Coordinator	

== See also ==
- Ecuador national football team
- Ecuador women's national football team
- Ecuadorian football league system
  - Ecuadorian Serie A
  - Ecuadorian Serie B
- List of football clubs in Ecuador
