= Ana Gutiérrez (footballer) =

Chilean footballer (born 1996)

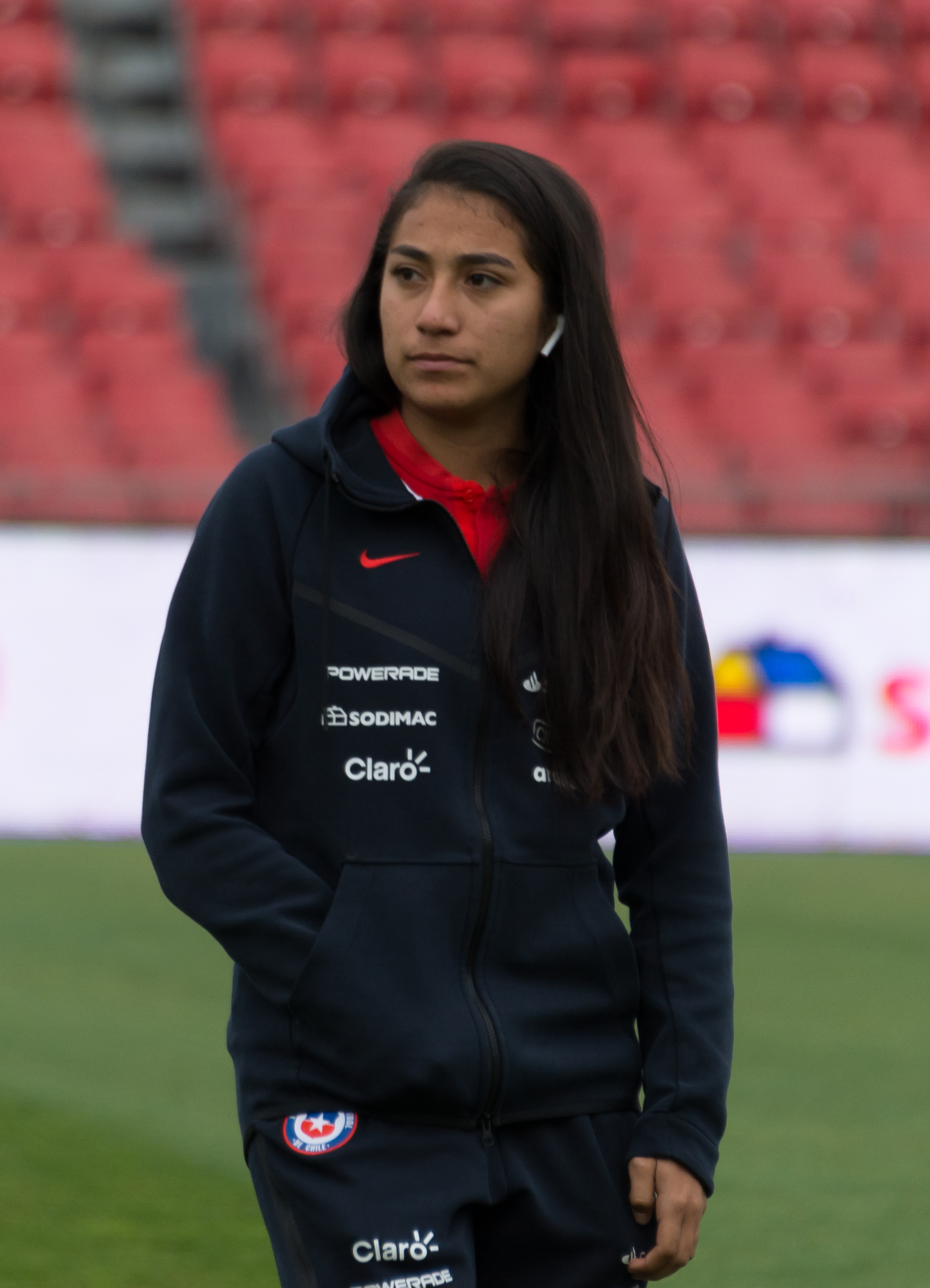
- Gutiérrez with Chile in 2019

Personal information
- Full name: Ana Gabriela Gutiérrez Díaz
- Date of birth: 20 June 1996 (age 30)
- Place of birth: Santiago, Chile
- Height: 1.61 m (5 ft 3 1/2 in)
- Position: Midfielder

Team information
- Current team: Universitario

Senior career*
Years	Team	Apps	(Gls)
2017–2018	Colo-Colo		
2018–2020	CFF Cáceres		
2020–2023	Universidad de Chile		
2025–2026	Santiago Wanderers	20+	(2+)
2026–	Universitario	0	(0)

International career^{‡}
2017	Chile (futsal)		
2018–2019	Chile	5	(0)
- * Club domestic league appearances and goals ‡ National team caps and goals as of 18 January 2019

Ana Gabriela Gutiérrez Díaz (born 20 June 1996) is a Chilean footballer who plays as a midfielder for Peruvian Primera División club Universitario.

== Club career ==
Gutiérrez joined Universidad de Chile in 2020. In November 2023, they ended her contract by common agreement.

After a year as a free agent, Gutiérrez signed with Santiago Wanderers in March 2025. She ended her contract in August 2026.

She moved to Peruvian Primera División club Universitario in September 2026.

== International career ==
She represented the Chile national futsal team in the 2017 Copa América.
