= Serie A Femenina de Ecuador =

- Founded: 2006
- Country: Ecuador
- Confederation: CONMEBOL
- Divisions: Serie A Serie B
- Current champions: Bejucal Sport (1st title) (2024)
- Most championships: Unión Española (3 titles)
- Top scorer: Madelin Riera (245 goals)

The Serie A Femenina de Ecuador is the highest amateur league of women's football in Ecuador. The competition is organised by the Ecuadorian Football Federation. Until 2013, the tournament was played by divisional selections and not clubs. After a restructuring in 2013 clubs contest the league title. Until 2018, the winner qualified to the Copa Libertadores Femenina.

As of 2014 all teams are amateur and do not pay their players, the only exception is Rocafuerte which pays small amounts of money.

== History ==
The national championship was announced and first held 2006. It is open to representative teams of all provinces of Ecuador and not to clubs. In the first edition fifteen regions entered a team and eventually the Guayas selection finished on top of the Pichincha selection to become the first champions.

Year	Winner	Result	Runner-up
2006	Guayas selection	round-robin	Pichincha selection
2007	Pichincha selection	3–0	Imbabura selection
2008	Pichincha selection	0–0 (3–2 p)	Guayas selection
2009	Guayas selection	2–0	Tungurahua selection
2010	Pichincha selection	2–1	Guayas selection
2011	Chimborazo selection	1–1 (4–3 p)	Imbabura selection
2012	Loja selection	1–0	Guayas selection

In 2013 the league was restructured and is only played by clubs since then. 16 teams were divided into four groups of four. The top two advance and then form two groups of four. The top two teams advance to the semi-finals. For the 2014 season, the twelve best placed teams of the 2013 season will build the first league while the four last placed teams will play in a new second division. Those divisions are called Serie A and Serie B and both start the 2014 season with twelve teams.

By 2014 the FEF committed to apply seminars by FIFA on female tournaments, on referees, coaching, directive, and players.

The 2016 season had to be postponed, because of monetary problems. Because of that the second stage was delayed until January 2017. The top four team of each of the two groups qualified to the second stage.

== List of champions ==
Ed.	Season	Champion	Runner-up
1	2013	Rocafuerte	Quito FC
2	2014	Rocafuerte	Siete de Febrero
3	2015	Unión Española	Espuce
4	2016–17	Unión Española	Espuce
5	2017–18	Unión Española	Ñañas
6	2019	Liga Deportivo Juvenil	San Miguel
7	2020	Sport JC	Espuce
8	2021	Delfín	Atlético Fluminense
9	2022	Bonita Banana	Ñusta
10	2023	Oriental	Orense
11	2024	Bejucal Sport	Mushuc Runa
12	2025		
