= Fernanda Araya =

Chilean footballer (born 1994)

Personal information
- Full name: Fernanda Ignacia Araya Toloza
- Date of birth: 12 October 1994 (age 32)
- Place of birth: Santiago, Chile
- Height: 1.70 m (5 ft 7 in)
- Position: Centre forward

Team information
- Current team: Maccabi Kishronot Hadera

College career
Years	Team	Apps	(Gls)
2018–2022	OVU Fighting Scots	19	(17)

Senior career*
Years	Team	Apps	(Gls)
2014–2018	Universidad de Chile		
2017	→ Abu Dhabi SC (loan)		
2022	Santiago Morning		(12)
2023–2024	Universidad de Chile	28+	(22+)
2025	Dragonas IDV	23	(18)
2026–	Maccabi Kishronot Hadera	0	(0)

International career^{‡}
2014	Chile U20	1+	(1)
2013–	Chile	7+	(4)
Medal record
Women's football
Representing Chile
South American Games
Silver medal – second place	2014 Santiago	Team
- * Club domestic league appearances and goals as of 19 July 2026 ‡ National team caps and goals as of 18 January 2019

Fernanda Ignacia Araya Toloza (born 12 October 1994) is a Chilean footballer who plays as a central forward for Ligat Nashim club Maccabi Kishronot Hadera and the Chile women's national team.

== Club career ==
As a player of Universidad de Chile, Araya had a stint with Emirati club Abu Dhabi SC alongside her fellows Sofía Hartard and Ámbar Soruco.

In January 2025, Araya moved to Ecuador and signed with Dragonas IDV. In September 2025, she suffered an Achilles tendon rupture.

Back to Chile, she trained with Universidad Católica during the first half of 2026 and moved to Israel to play for Maccabi Kishronot Hadera in the 2026–27 season.

== International career ==
Araya represented Chile at the 2014 South American U-20 Women's Championship. At senior level, she played the 2014 South American Games and the 2014 Copa América Femenina.

=== International goals ===
Scores and results list Chile's goal tally first

No.	Date	Venue	Opponent	Score	Result	Competition
1.	18 December 2013	Estádio Nacional Mané Garrincha, Brasília, Brazil	Scotland	3–2	4–3	2013 International Women's Football Tournament of Brasília
2.	12 March 2014	Estadio Bicentenario de La Florida, Santiago, Chile	Bolivia	2–0	2–0	2014 South American Games
3.	16 March 2014	Estadio Bicentenario de La Florida, Santiago, Chile	Argentina	1–1	1–2	2014 South American Games
4.	20 September 2014	Estadio Jorge Andrade, Azogues, Ecuador	Paraguay	2–1	2–3	2014 Copa América Femenina
5.	1 June 2024	Estadio Cementos Progreso, Guatemala City, Guatemala	Guatemala	1–0	6–1	Friendly
6.	1 June 2024	Estadio Cementos Progreso, Guatemala City, Guatemala	Guatemala	5–1	6–1	Friendly
7.	15 July 2024	Estadio Ypané, Ypané, Paraguay	Paraguay	1–0	5–0	Friendly
8.	15 July 2024	Estadio Ypané, Ypané, Paraguay	Paraguay	2–0	5–0	Friendly
9.	15 July 2024	Estadio Ypané, Ypané, Paraguay	Paraguay	4–0	5–0	Friendly
10.	28 October 2024	Estadio Rodrigo Paz Delgado, Quito, Ecuador	Ecuador	1–1	2–1	Friendly
11.	28 October 2024	Estadio Rodrigo Paz Delgado, Quito, Ecuador	Ecuador	2–1	2–1	Friendly

== Honours ==
Universidad de Chile

- Chilean Primera División: 2016 Apertura

Independiente del Valle

- Superliga Ecuatoriana Femenina: 2025

Chile

- South American Games Silver medal: 2014

Individual

- Chilean Primera División Ideal Team: 2024
- Chilean Primera División Crack Player: 2024
