= Football in Chile =

- Country: Chile
- Governing body: Federación de Fútbol de Chile
- National team: Chile
- First played: 1867

National competitions
- FIFA World Cup; Confederations Cup; Copa América

Club competitions
- List: League: Chilean Primera División; Cups: Copa Chile Copa de la Liga

International competitions
- FIFA Club World Cup; Copa Libertadores; Copa Sudamericana

Football is the most popular sport in Chile. Approximately 80% of Chileans are interested in football.

The country's history of association football began with English sailors and their boat trips due to various commercial links between Chile and the United Kingdom of Great Britain and Ireland in the 19th century.

== History ==
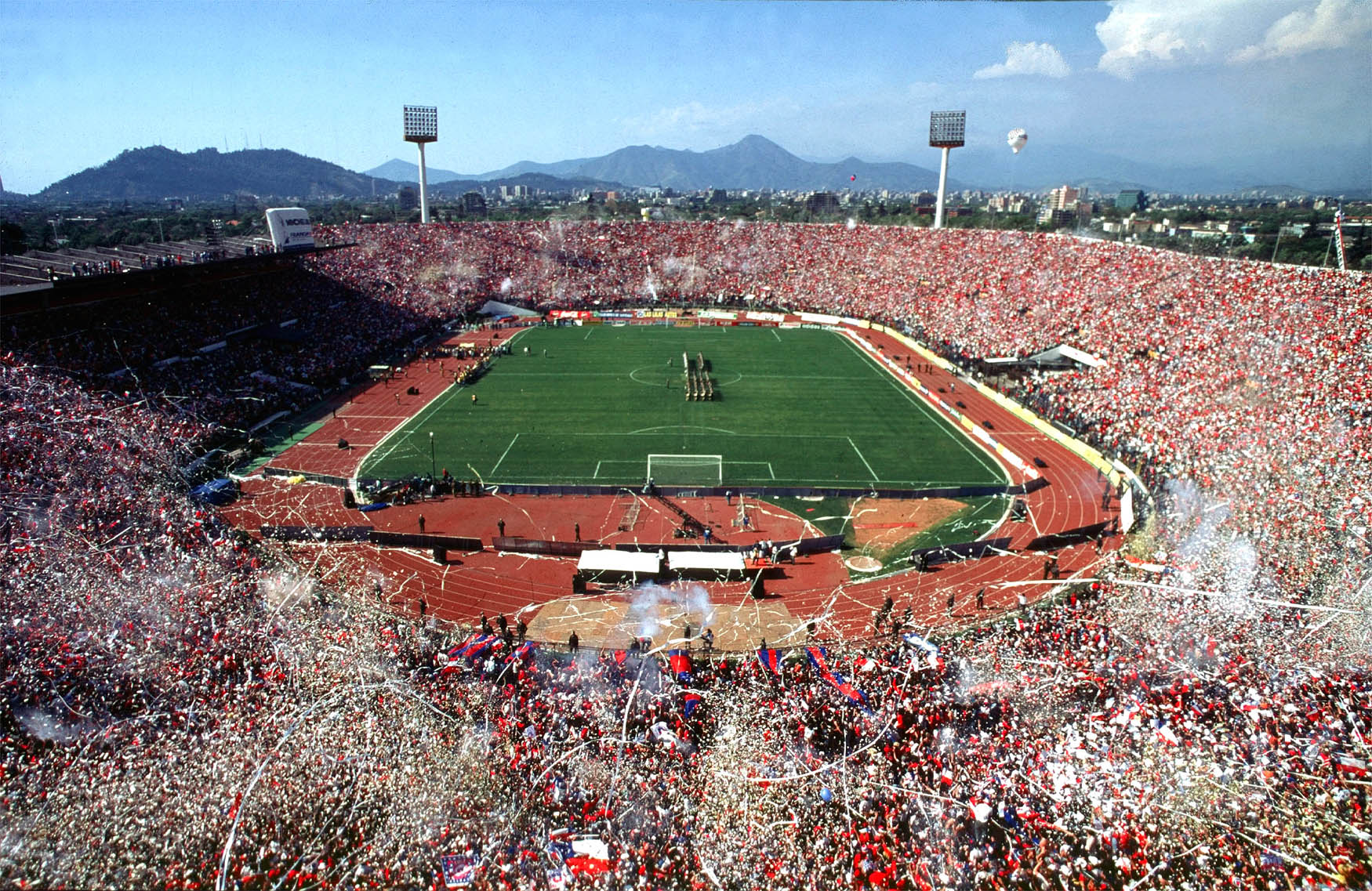
Estadio Nacional de Chile (National Stadium of Chile).

Football was first brought to Chile by the English that exhibited the sport during visits to the commercial ports such as in Valparaíso. Chileans living in the area would watch how the sport was being played. Wealthy and notable upper class Chilean families incorporated the sport in 1880 into their regular rituals which saw the first games of football in the country. This occurred within the confines of a significant British school, The Mackay and Sutherland School in Cerro Alegre, Valparaíso, and considered to be the first football club in the country and in South America, founded by sons of British immigrants.

Chile's oldest club was founded in the port of Valparaíso, and it was named Valparaiso Football Club. The governing body of Chilean football Federación de Fútbol de Chile was established in 1895. Chile was one of the founding members of CONMEBOL which launched the first South American international championship now known as the Copa America.

Other important factors that helped the sport of football spread in Chile were the club tours from other nations, such as Argentina and Peru, held in Chile. Furthermore, the first South American tournaments aided in making Chile a better force in the world of association football. By the time the 1930 FIFA World Cup took place in Uruguay, Chile gave a decent performance but was not able to reach the second round due to losing to Argentina and thus getting second place. The next major step in the international arena took place in the 1962 FIFA World Cup which was held in Chile, and a series of interesting stories were built around the victories of the Chilean team that brought the country joy after the terrible earthquake that had deeply hurt the nation. Although Chile did not win, the team was able to obtain 3rd place in the competition.

Chile is also one of the only one of two national teams in South America to have reached the final of any major FIFA men's senior competitions other than Argentina, Brazil and Uruguay, having finished runners-up in 2017 FIFA Confederations Cup, the other being Venezuela after reaching the final of 2017 FIFA U-20 World Cup held earlier.

Currently, Chilean football remains a strong force in Latin America. Colo-Colo has been the only Chilean club to win a Copa Libertadores championship: the 1991 Copa Libertadores. Also won the Copa Interamericana 1991 and the 1992 Recopa Sudamericana. Other clubs such as Cobreloa, Unión Española and Universidad Católica have played finals finishing in 2nd place. And Universidad de Chile has been the only Chilean club to win a Copa Sudamericana championship.

On women's football, Chile even earns a greater reputation. Colo-Colo was the first non-Brazilian champion in Copa Libertadores Femenina, having done so in 2012 edition, and has since remained a strong force of women's football in South America.

== National teams ==
The Chile national team represents Chile at all international football competitions. The team is controlled by the Federación de Fútbol de Chile which was established in 1895. They won Copa América in 2015 and 2016. They have also appeared in 9 FIFA World Cup tournaments and were hosts of the 1962 FIFA World Cup finishing in 3rd place. Chile achieved their highest ever ranking in FIFA, standing third, between April and May 2016.

A women's team, an under-20 team, and an under-17 team also compete. The Chilean women team qualified for their first ever 2019 FIFA Women's World Cup.

Chile under-17 football team has written history by becoming the first national team of Chile to play in three consecutive FIFA World Cup, having qualified to the 2019 FIFA U-17 World Cup after hosting the 2015 and qualified to the 2017 editions.

== Attendances ==
The average attendance per top-flight football league season and the club with the highest average attendance:

Season	League average	Best club	Best club average
2025	6,763	Universidad de Chile	29,632
2024	7,948	Universidad de Chile	36,767
2023	6,670	Colo-Colo	34,400
2022	5,005	Colo-Colo	20,273

Sources: League pages on Wikipedia

== See also ==
- Chilean football league system
  - Liga de Primera – highest tier
  - Campeonato Nacional Primera B – second tier
  - Segunda División Profesional de Chile – third tier
  - Tercera A (Chile) – fourth tier
  - Tercera B – fifth tier
  - Campeonato Nacional Fútbol Femenino – highest women's tier
  - Women's Primera B – second women's tier
