= L'Alcúdia International Football Tournament =

- Founded: 1984
- Current champions: Morocco (3rd title)
- Most championships: (Spain) Valencia CF (6 titles)
- Website: www.cotifalcudia.com (in Spanish)
- 2026 COTIF Tournament

The Torneo Internacional de Fútbol Sub-20 de L'Alcúdia (L'Alcúdia International Under-20 Football Tournament), better known as COTIF, is an annual international invitational football competition for youth teams, open to both clubs and national and regional teams, held in L'Alcúdia, Valencia since 1984. Since 2012 it also holds a senior women's football tournament. From the 2016 edition, the men's tournament will feature international under-20 teams only.

== Champions ==
=== Men's under-20 football ===
Year	Champion	Runner-up	3rd	4th	MVP	Top scorer	Best goalkeeper
1984	(Spain) Valencia	(Spain) Real Madrid	(Portugal) Povoa Varzim	(Spain) CE L'Alcúdia	(Spain) M. Bugallo	(Spain) V.A. Martínez	(Spain) A.F. Pérez
1985	(Spain) Valencia	(Spain) Barcelona	(Spain) CE L'Alcúdia	(Spain) UD Alzira	(Spain) M. Domínguez	(Spain) M. Domínguez	(Spain) A. Cámara
1986	Soviet Union	(Spain) Valencia	(Portugal) S.L. Benfica	(Spain) Sporting de Gijón	(Soviet Union) A. Piatnitski	(Germany) G. Poschner	
1987	Morocco	(Spain) Valencia	(Spain) Sevilla	(Spain) CE L'Alcúdia	(Morocco) B. Taotiq	(Spain) J.A. Barragán	(Spain) J.M. Romero
1988	Soviet Union	Algeria	(Scotland) Aberdeen FC	(Spain) Valencia	(Soviet Union) S. Kiriakov	(Spain) A. Pinilla	(Soviet Union) Y. Okroshidze
1989	Soviet Union	East Germany	(Spain) Valencia	(Spain) Athletic Bilbao	(Soviet Union) M. Qosimov	(Spain) J. Ayala	(Soviet Union) Y. Okroshidze
1990	Brazil	Soviet Union	Spain	(Spain) Valencia	(Brazil) Zé María	(Spain) A. Águila	(Brazil) R.J. de Noronha
1991	Soviet Union	Cameroon	(Spain) CA Osasuna	(Chile) Unión Española	(Cameroon) J.A. Abarga	(Soviet Union) I. Faizulin	(Soviet Union) I. Blyznyuk
1992	(Spain) Barcelona	(Spain) Valencia	Russia	(Ukraine) Dnipro Dnipropetrovsk	(Spain) I. de la Peña	(Russia) A. Konovalov	(Russia) S. Alexandrov
1993	Ukraine	Chile	United States	Italy	(Chile) F. Ferragut	(Ukraine) H. Moroz	(Ukraine) S. Dolhanskyi
1994	(Spain) Real Madrid	(Denmark) Brøndby	(Spain) Valencia	(Spain) Barcelona	(Chile) S. Rozental	(Spain) Raúl	(Spain) R. Gómez
1995	Ukraine	(Spain) Valencia	(Italy) AC Fiorentina	(Spain) Real Madrid	(Ukraine) H. Zubov	(Spain) I. Marchal	(Ukraine) S. Perkhun
1996	Morocco	(Spain) Valencia	Uruguay	(Spain) Albacete Balompié	(Uruguay) N. Olivera	(Spain) J. Cordero	(Morocco) P. El Jarrouni
1997	(Spain) Barcelona	(Spain) Atlético de Madrid	(Spain) Real Madrid	(Spain) CE L'Alcúdia	(Spain) A. Sánchez	(Spain) D. Prats	?
1998	Chile	Russia	(Spain) Real Madrid	(Spain) Barcelona	(Argentina) D. Manso	(Uruguay) J. Chevantón	(Spain) Bermúdez
1999	(Brazil) Corinthians	(Argentina) Boca Juniors	Mexico	(Spain) Barcelona	?	?	?
2000	(Spain) Valencia	(Argentina) Boca Juniors	(Brazil) Portuguesa	(Spain) Real Madrid	(Brazil) R. Oliveira	(Spain) Kabi	(Spain) A. Marrana
2001	(Brazil) São Paulo	(Spain) Barcelona	(Peru) Alianza Lima	(Spain) Real Madrid	(Spain) A. Moral	(Brazil) Kléber	(Brazil) A. Dos Santos
2002	Brazil	(United States) USA	Uruguay	Costa Rica	(Brazil) Cacá	(Uruguay) R. Olivera	(United States) S. Cronin
2003	Uruguay	Ukraine	(Spain) Valencian Community	Egypt	(United States) C. Marshall	(Uruguay) E. Fernández	(Ukraine) S. Bohush
2004	(Spain) Espanyol	(Spain) Villarreal	(Spain) Valencia	(Spain) Barcelona	(Spain) X. Nadal	(Spain) A. Yagüe	(Spain) G. Ribas
2005	(Spain) Valencia	(Spain) Barcelona	(Spain) Espanyol	(Brazil) Cruzeiro	(Cameroon) F. Songo'o	(Brazil) Tadeu	(Brazil) Flávio
2006	(Paraguay) Guaraní	(Brazil) Grêmio	(Spain) Valencia	Russia	(Paraguay) D. Mendieta	(Brazil) A. Guerrero	?
2007	(Spain) Real Madrid	(Spain) Levante	(Brazil) Atlético Mineiro	(Spain) Sevilla	(Brazil) Luciano	(Brazil) Edílson	(Paraguay) J. Silva
2008	(Spain) Villarreal	Brazil	Uruguay	(Paraguay) Guaraní	(Brazil) Walter	(Uruguay) A. Hernández	(Spain) R. Jiménez
2009	(Spain) Valencia	Venezuela	Japan	(Spain) Villarreal	(Spain) Isco	(Spain) R. Martí	(Venezuela) R. Romo
2010	Ecuador	(Brazil) Santos	(Spain) Valencia	(Spain) Villarreal	(Brazil) R. Mota	(Spain) J. Gracia	(Ecuador) J. Jaramillo
2011	(Spain) Valencia	(Brazil) Juventude	(Spain) Villarreal	(Spain) Levante	(Spain) R. Ibáñez	(Spain) R. García	(Brazil) A. Tomaz
2012	Argentina	Spain	South Korea	Turkey	(Argentina) A. Ruiz	(Argentina) M. Icardi	(Spain) A. Ortolá
2013	Spain	Argentina	Mexico	Canada	(Spain) J. Bernal	(Australia) P. Skapetis	(Spain) A. Cantero
2014	Brazil	(Spain) Levante	Argentina	Ecuador	(Spain) Pepelu	(Brazil) Gabriel	(Spain) S. Tienza
2015	Chile	(Spain) Atlético de Madrid	(Brazil) Santos	(Spain) Levante	(Chile) F. Sierralta	(Chile) J. Vargas	(Brazil) J. Víctor

Under 20 National Teams
Year	Champion	Runner-up	MVP	Top scorer	Best goalkeeper	Best manager
2016	Spain	Argentina	(Argentina) Lautaro Martínez	(Spain) Joel Rodríguez	(Argentina) Facundo Nicolás Cambeses	(Spain) Luis de la Fuente Castillo
2017	(Spain) Atlético de Madrid	(Spain) Valencia CF	N/A			
2018	Argentina	Russia	N/A			
2019	Spain	Russia	N/A			
2021	(Spain) Elche CF	(Spain) UD Alzira	N/A			
2022	Argentina	Uruguay	N/A			
2024	Uruguay	Argentina	N/A			
2025	Argentina	(Spain) Valencia CF	N/A			
2026	Morocco	Mauritania	N/A			

=== Women's football ===
Year	Champion	Res.	Runner-up	3rd	4th	MVP	Top scorer
2011	(Spain) Levante UD	2–0	(Spain) Valencia CF				
2012	(Spain) Levante UD	2–0	(Spain) Valencia CF	(Spain) CFF Marítim	(Spain) Mislata CFF	(Spain) Alharilla Casado	(Spain) Raquel Pinel
2013	(Spain) Levante UD	1–1^{1}	(Spain) Valencia CF	(Spain) Albacete Balompié	(Spain) Villarreal CF	(Japan) Mitsue Iwakura	(Spain) Olga García
2014	(Spain) FC Barcelona	1–0	(Spain) Levante UD	(France) Montpellier HSC	(Spain) Valencia CF	(Cameroon) Francine Zouga	(Spain) Nuria Garrote
2015	(Spain) Athletic Bilbao	1–0	(Spain) Valencia CF	(Spain) RCD Espanyol	Namibia	(Spain) Irene Paredes	(Spain) Georgina Carreras
2016	(Spain) Real Betis	1–1^{2}	Venezuela	(Spain) RCD Espanyol	Kenya	(Kenya) Mbeyu Esse	(Spain) Irene Guerrero
2017	(Spain) Atlético Madrid	3–1	(Spain) Valencia CF	Morocco	(Spain) Levante UD	(Spain) Sonia Bermúdez	(Brazil) Joyce Borini
2018	(Spain) Levante UD	1–0	(Spain) Madrid CFF	Morocco	(Spain) Albacete Balompié		
2019	Spain U19	1–0	(Spain) Villarreal CF	India	Bolivia U19		(Spain) María Colonques
2022	(Spain) Villarreal CF	2–1	Argentina U20			(Spain) Sheila Guijarro	(Argentina) Agostina Holzheier

^{1} Levante UD won 3–2 on penalties. ^{2} Real Betis won 5–4 on penalties.

== Broadcasting rights ==
- Latin America: TNT
- Brazil: Esporte Interativo
- Argentina: ESPN
- Paraguay: TNT Sports
- Uruguay: AUF TV
