= Francisco Huerta (footballer) =

Chilean footballer and manager (born 1967)

Personal information
- Full name: Francisco Miguel Huerta Vidal
- Date of birth: 11 December 1967 (age 58)
- Place of birth: Santiago, Chile
- Position: Midfielder

Youth career
- Colo-Colo

Senior career*
Years	Team	Apps	(Gls)
1987–1989	Colo-Colo		
1988	→ Alianza Lima (loan)		
1989	→ Cobreandino (loan)		(2)
1990	Inter San Borja		
1991–1992	Ovación Sipesa		
1993	Cienciano		
1993	Deportes Iquique	19	(1)

Managerial career
- 2012: Colo-Colo (youth)
- 2013: Deportes Temuco U19
- 2013: Deportes Temuco (assistant)
- 2013: Deportes Temuco
- 2019: San Antonio Unido (youth)
- 2019–2020: San Antonio Unido
- 2022: La Pintana Unida
- 2022–: Fernández Vial (youth)
- * Club domestic league appearances and goals

Francisco Miguel Huerta Vidal (born 11 December 1967) is a Chilean football manager and former footballer who played as a midfielder for clubs in Chile and Peru.

== Club career ==
A product of Colo-Colo youth system, Huerta was loaned to Alianza Lima for the 1988 season after the tragic plane crash that suffered the Peruvian squad on 8 December 1987, alongside his fellows José Letelier, Parcko Quiroz and René Pinto. The deal was for three months, but he stayed in Peru all the year. He made his debut against Coronel Bolognesi on 3 January 1988, playing alongside Teófilo Cubillas.

After a stint with Cobreandino, where he scored two goals, he returned to Peru and played for Inter San Borja, Ovación Sipesa, with whom he won the 1992 Torneo Zonal and got promotion to the top level, and Cienciano.

In 1993, he played for Deportes Iquique in the Chilean top division.

He retired at the age of 29.

== Coaching career ==
He graduated as a football manager at the INAF (National Football Institute) and began his career at the Colo-Colo youth ranks. He also has worked for the youth ranks of Deportes Temuco and San Antonio Unido as well as the head coach of both. In 2019 he assumed as the head coach of San Antonio Unido, replacing Freddy Ferragut.

In 2022, he assumed as the coach of La Pintana Unida in the Chilean Tercera A. After, he joined Fernández Vial youth system.

== Personal life ==
As a player of Alianza Lima, he was nicknamed El Rey de la Huacha (The King of the Nutmeg).

Huerta married the daughter of the Alianza Lima's president, Agustín Merino, and they had a daughter. Then, they divorced and Huerta had another two daughters with the partner with whom he returned to his homeland in 2005.

In Peru, he managed a coffin factory.

== Honours ==
- Torneo Zonal: 1992
