= Juan Gutiérrez =

Juan Gutiérrez may refer to:

== Sportspeople ==
=== Association football ===
- Juan Gutiérrez (footballer, born 1964) (born 1964), Chilean football forward
- Juanito (footballer, born 1976) (Juan Gutiérrez Moreno), Spanish footballer
- Juanito (footballer, born 1980) (Juan Jesús Gutierrez), Spanish footballer who currently plays for UD Almería
- Juan Gutiérrez (footballer, born 1990) (born 1990), Chilean football midfielder
- Juan Diego Gutiérrez (born 1992), Peruvian footballer
- Juan Gutiérrez (footballer, born 1996), Mexican football forward
- Juan Gutiérrez (footballer, born 2000), Spanish football centre back
- Juan Gutierrez (footballer, born 2005), Colombian football defender

=== Other sports ===
- Juan Gutiérrez (baseball) (born 1983), Venezuelan baseball player who currently plays for the San Francisco Giants
- Juan Pedro Gutiérrez (born 1983), Argentinian basketball player who currently plays for CB Gran Canaria
- Juan Jesús Gutiérrez (sprinter) (born 1969), Mexican sprinter
- Juan Jesús Gutiérrez Cuevas (born 1969), Spanish cross country skier

== Other people ==
- Juan Gutiérrez (bishop) (1578–1649), Roman Catholic prelate who served as Bishop of Vigevano
- Juan Gutiérrez de Padilla (c. 1590–1664), composer
- Juan B. Gutiérrez (born 1973), American mathematician and author
- Juan José Gutiérrez Mayorga (born 1958), Guatemalan businessman
- Juan María Gutiérrez (1809–1878), Argentine statesman, jurist, surveyor, historian, critic, and poet
- Juan Simón Gutiérrez (1634–1718), Spanish Baroque painter
