= Keymer (disambiguation) =

Keymer is a village in the Mid Sussex District of West Sussex, England.

Keymer may also refer to:

Things located in Burgess Hill, which incorporated the northern part of the parish of Keymer:

- Keymer Tiles, a traditional producer of clay roof tiles founded in 1588 and located in Burgess Hill
- Keymer Junction, a railway junction between the Brighton Main Line and a branch of the East Coastway line, just south of Wivelsfield railway station
- Keymer Junction, a former railway station, later renamed Wivelsfield

People with the surname Keymer:

- Josefina Keymer (born 2000), Chilean footballer
- Oskar Keymer (born 2003), German actor
- Vincent Keymer (born 2004), German chess Grandmaster

== See also ==
- Operation Keymer, a crackdown on cannabis-growing factories in the United Kingdom during late 2006
