= René Pinto =

René Pinto may refer to:

- René Pinto (footballer) (born 1965), Chilean footballer
- René Pinto (baseball) (born 1996), Venezuelan baseball player
