= Carlos Véliz =

Carlos Véliz may refer to:

- Carlos Véliz (shot putter), Cuban shot putter
- Carlos Véliz (football manager), Chilean football and futsal manager
- Carlos Pezoa Véliz, Chilean poet, educator and journalist
