= O'Higgins F.C. Women =

Chilean football club

O'Higgins
- Full name: O'Higgins Fútbol Club
- Nickname: Las Capitas
- Founded: 15 November 2018; 7 years ago as Club Deportivo O'Higgins
- Ground: Monasterio Celeste, Rancagua, Chile
- Capacity: 100
- Main Manager: Matías Ahumada
- Manager: Manuel Alarcón
- League: Ascenso Femenino
- Website: www.ohigginsfc.cl
Home colours	Away colours

O'Higgins F.C. Women are the women's team of O'Higgins. They currently play in the Ascenso Femenino, the second level of women football in Chile.

== History ==
In 2019, they began their participation in the first edition of the Primera B Femenina, becoming the first and only club from the O'Higgins Region to compete at the national level in women's competitions.

On November 13, 2021, after defeating Rangers de Talca 2-1 in the Estadio El Teniente, they secured their promotion to the Liga Femenina de Chile. In the final, they played against Huachipato FC, drawing 3-3 at the regular time, losing the penalty shout-out 2-0, losing the first final of the team since his first participation.

Their debut was challenging, ending in a loss to Colo-Colo, and although the team showed flashes of good football, their inconsistency ultimately cost them. At the end of the season, the Celestes failed to secure the necessary points to avoid relegation and were relegated to Primera B Femenina. Thiare Parraguez was one of the standout players of the season, finishing as the league's top scorer with 20 goals.

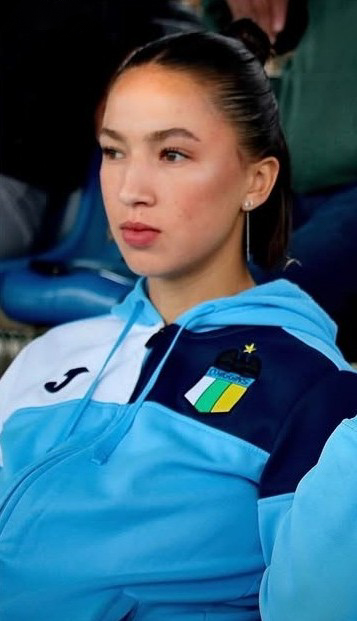
Jasmín Moya is the current club captain.

Back in the Women's Second Division, 2023 was a pivotal year for the club's internal structure. In compliance with new Chilean legislation, the club began formalizing professional contracts with some of its players. On the pitch, the team remained competitive in the Central-South Zone, but the championship format was extremely demanding, and they were unable to achieve immediate promotion back to the top flight, falling just short of the final stages.

During the 2025 regular season, the team was a dominant force, achieving historic victories and finishing as undefeated leaders of their group. Players like Alejandra Manzo and Aracely Castillo were pillars of the squad. However, in the playoff semifinals, they fell to Magallanes, preventing them from securing one of the promotion spots to the Liga Femenina.

During 2025, the club maintained the core of its professional squad, opting for continuity in the process. Currently, in the 2026 season, O'Higgins is competing in the Southern Group of the Liga de Ascenso, captained by goalkeeper Jasmín Moya. Isidora Pozo, one of the most experienced players on the team, was the first transfer to the U.S. leagues, being transferred to Indiana Tech Warriors.

== Facilities ==
Monasterio Celeste
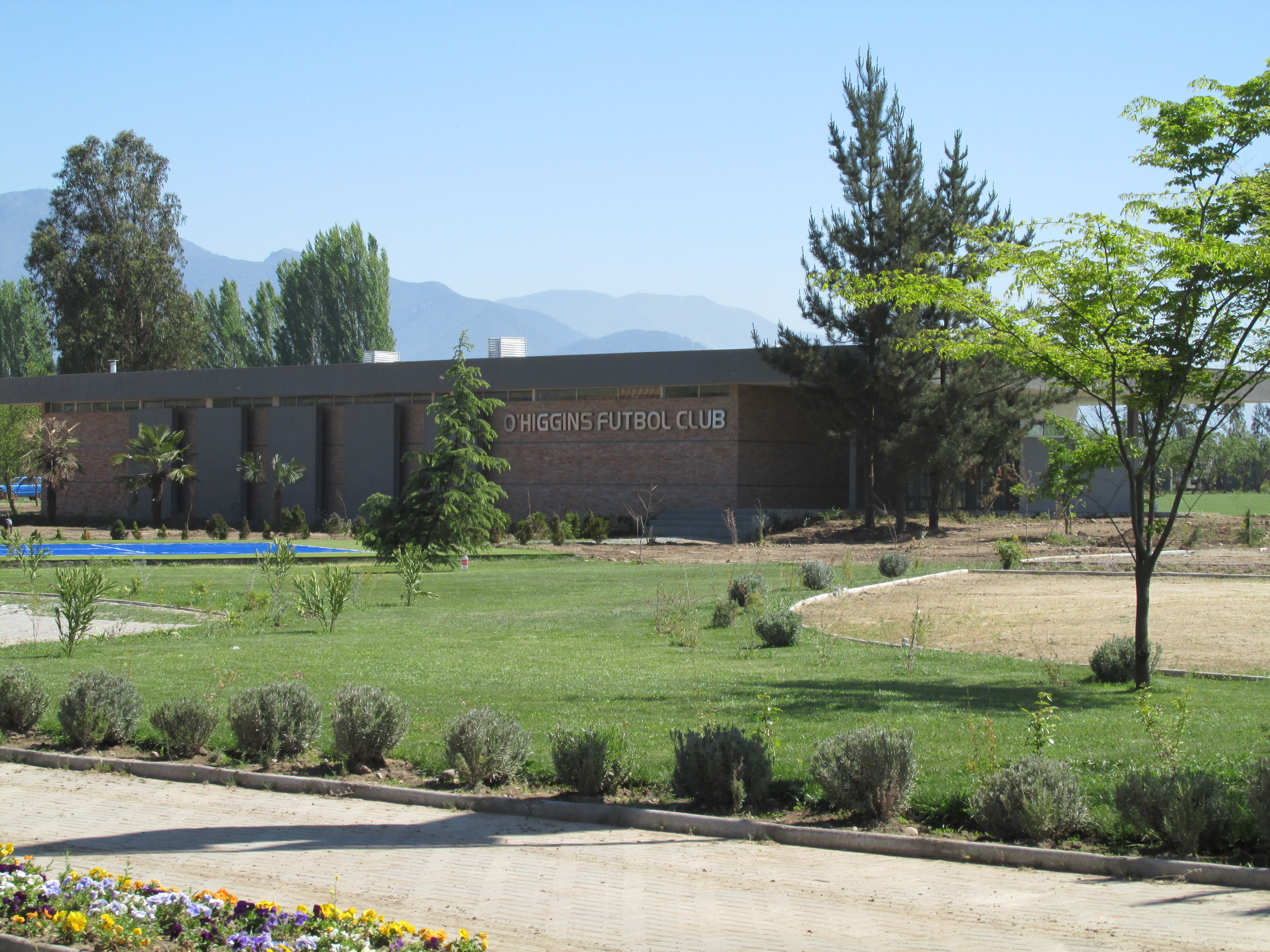
- Capacity: 100
- Surface: Natural grass

Construction
- Opened: 2014

The Monasterio Celeste located in Requínoa serves as the main stadium of the team. While originally conceived to modernize the men’s professional squad and youth academy, the facility has become the cornerstone for the women's team since the team's integration into the club's professional structure. Also, Estadio El Teniente has been used in some important matches like Promotion play-offs in the inaugural season, as well the training centre is the main and most useful site for official matches.

== Players ==
=== First-team squad ===
As of 14 March 2026

Note: Flags indicate national team as defined under FIFA eligibility rules; some limited exceptions apply. Players may hold more than one non-FIFA nationality.

No.	Pos.	Nation	Player
1	GK	CHI	Jasmín Moya (captain)
2	DF	CHI	Millaray Moya
3	MF	CHI	Sofía Pardo (vice-captain)
4	DF	CHI	Simoney Valenzuela
5	DF	CHI	Sandy Álvarez
6	MF	CHI	Génesis Navarro
7	FW	CHI	Ángela Madriaga
8	MF	CHI	Patricia Manríquez
9	FW	CHI	Catalina Celis
10	MF	CHI	Sofía Valderas
11	MF	CHI	Antonia Huerta
12	GK	CHI	Paz Cárdenas

No.	Pos.	Nation	Player
13	FW	CHI	Paulette Marcell
14	MF	CHI	Belén Ormeño
15	DF	CHI	Ayline Sepúlveda
16	MF	CHI	Savka Díaz
17	DF	CHI	Valentina Adasme
18	DF	CHI	Javiera Garrido
20	DF	CHI	Bárbara Muñoz
21	MF	CHI	Antonella Apablaza
22	MF	CHI	Renata Carrasco
23	GK	CHI	Ignacia Parraguez
24	FW	CHI	Constanza Vega

=== Notable past players ===
- (Chile) Fernanda Valdés
- (Chile) Catalina Saavedra
- (Chile) Thiare Parraguez
- (Chile) Almay Cerpa
- (Chile) Aracely Castillo
- (Chile) Daniela Figueroa
- (Chile) Victoria Herrera
- (Chile) Pia Jofré
- (Chile) Isidora Pozo

== Managers ==
- (Chile) Manuel Alarcón (2018–2021)
- (Chile) Ricardo Madariaga (2022)
- (Chile) Felipe Reyes (2023)
- (Chile) Manuel Alarcón (2024–)

== Honours ==
=== Domestic ===
- Primera B runner-up: 2021
