= Monserrat Hernández =

Chilean footballer

Personal information
- Full name: Monserrat Consuelo Hernández Scarpati
- Date of birth: 19 July 2005 (age 21)
- Place of birth: Arica, Chile
- Height: 1.61 m (5 ft 3 in)
- Position: Defender

Team information
- Current team: Universidad Católica

Youth career
- Deportes Iquique

Senior career*
Years	Team	Apps	(Gls)
2021	Deportes Iquique		
2022–2025	Santiago Morning	25+	(1+)
2026–	Universidad Católica		

International career^{‡}
2021–2022	Chile U17	10	(0)
2021	Chile U20		
2022–	Chile	2	(0)
- * Club domestic league appearances and goals ‡ National team caps and goals as of 22 January 2024

Monserrat Consuelo Hernández Scarpati (born 19 July 2005) is a Chilean footballer who plays as a defender for Universidad Católica. Mainly a defender, she can also operate as a defensive midfielder.

== Club career ==
Born in Arica, Chile, Hernández is a product of Deportes Iquique and joined the senior team in 2021.

In 2022, Hernández moved to Santiago and joined Santiago Morning. She left them at the end of the 2025 season.

In December 2025, Hernández signed with Universidad Católica.

== International career ==
At youth level, Hernández received her first call-up to the Chile U17 in October 2021. Later, she represented them in both the 2022 South American Championship and the 2022 FIFA World Cup. She also represented the under-20's in a friendly tournament in November 2021.

At senior level, she received her first call-up in April 2022 for the friendlies against Argentina. The next year, she made her debut in a 0–4 loss against Brazil on 2 July 2023. She made a second appearance in a 2–1 win against New Zealand on 26 September of the same year.

== Personal life ==
Her parents, Karla and Pablo, are Sub-Officer and Senior Sub-Officer of Chilean Gendarmerie, respectively.

== Honours ==
Individual

- Premios FutFem - Best Centre-back: 2023
