= Sofía Hartard =

Chilean footballer (born 1996)

Personal information
- Full name: Sofía Ignacia Hartard Ojeda
- Date of birth: 6 March 1996 (age 30)
- Place of birth: Chile
- Height: 1.67 m (5 ft 6 in)
- Position: Midfielder

Team information
- Current team: Universidad Católica

Senior career*
Years	Team	Apps	(Gls)
2014–2017	Universidad de Chile		
2017	→ Abu Dhabi SC (loan)		
2017–2018	Sporting Huelva		
2018–2020	Alavés Gloriosas		
2021	Universidad de Chile		
2022–2024	Santiago Morning		
2025–	Universidad Católica		

International career
2017–	Chile		
- * Club domestic league appearances and goals

Sofía Ignacia Hartard Ojeda (born March 6, 1996) is a Chilean footballer who plays as a midfielder for Universidad Católica and Chile women's national team.

== Club career ==
Hartard played for Universidad de Chile from 2014 to 2017. As the team captain, she won the Apertura 2016 champion of Chile's Primera División with the club. She also had a stint with Emirati club Abu Dhabi SC alongside her fellows Ámbar Soruco and Fernanda Araya.

Hartard signed with Spanish club Sporting de Huelva in 2017. She made 30 appearances for the club in the 2017–2018 season.

From 2018 to 2020 Hartard played for Spanish club Alavés.

In 2021, she returned to Universidad de Chile.

In 2025, Hartard signed with Universidad Católica from Santiago Morning.

== International career ==
Hartard made her senior debut for Chile in a friendly against Brazil on November 25, 2017.

== Personal life ==
Sofía Hartard is the sister of Chilean footballer Elías Hartard.
