= Paula Navarro =

Chilean football manager

Personal information
- Full name: Paula Andrea Navarro Alvear
- Date of birth: 19 December 1972 (age 53)
- Place of birth: Santiago, Chile

Managerial career
- Years: Team
- Santiago Morning (women) (youth)
- 2008–2021: Santiago Morning (women)
- 2018: Santiago Morning (assistant)
- 2023–2024: Santiago Morning (women)
- 2026: Nacional (women)

Paula Andrea Navarro Alvear (born 19 December 1972) is a Chilean football manager. She last managed Uruguayan club Nacional (women).

== Career ==
Navarro graduated as a PE teacher before becoming a football manager at INAF (National Institute of Football, Sport, and Physical Activity of Chile). Later, she specialized in Barcelona, Real Madrid and Athletic Bilbao.

A historical manager in the Liga Femenina de Chile, Navarro spent 13 years leading the Santiago Morning women's team from 2008 to 2021, winning three consecutive championships in 2018, 2019 and 2020 Transición. Leading them in the Copa Libertadores Femenina, they reached the quarter-finals in the 2019 edition.

In addition to coach the Santiago Morning senior team and the under 17's, she also served as a member of the Santiago Morning board and performed management duties, becoming the driving force of the first professional contracts for women's footballers in Chile in 2019.

In 2018, Navarro also had a stint as assistant coach of Jaime García in the Santiago Morning men's team.

After two years, Navarro returned to Santiago Morning in February 2023 and left them at the end of the 2024 season.

In January 2026, Navarro moved abroad to take in charge the Uruguayan giant Nacional women's team, winning the 2026 Campeonato Apertura undefeated. She left them in July of the same year.
