= Claudio Calderón =

Chilean footballer (born 1986)

Personal information
- Full name: Claudio Nicolás Calderón Ávila
- Date of birth: 5 January 1986 (age 40)
- Place of birth: Santiago, Chile
- Height: 1.72 m (5 ft 8 in)
- Position: Defender

Senior career*
Years	Team	Apps	(Gls)
2006–2008	Unión Española	17	(5)
2006	→ Ñublense (loan)	20	(1)
2007	→ Rayados A (loan)	2	(0)
2009	Curicó Unido	11	(0)
2009	Cobresal	0	(0)
2010–2011	San Marcos	36	(2)
2012	Deportes Puerto Montt	33	(4)
2013	Unión Temuco	8	(1)
2013–2015	Deportes Temuco	17	(1)
2015–2016	Coquimbo Unido	7	(1)
Total		151	(15)
- * Club domestic league appearances and goals

Claudio Nicolás Calderón Ávila (born 5 January 1986) is a Chilean former footballer who played as a defender.

== Career ==
In his homeland, Calderón played for Unión Española, Ñublense, Cobresal, San Marcos de Arica, Deportes Puerto Montt, Unión Temuco, Deportes Temuco and Coquimbo Unido.

Abroad, he played for Mexican side Rayados A.

At international level, Calderón was part of a Chile under-25 squad in a training session led by Claudio Borghi in May 2011, alongside his teammates in San Marcos de Arica, Elías Hartard and Esteban Pavez.
