= Esteban Pavez =

Chilean footballer (born 1990)

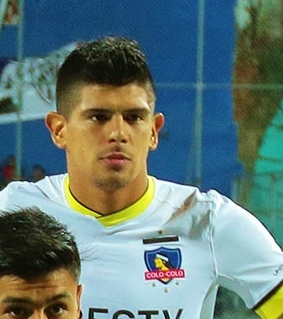
- Esteban pavez con Colo-Colo in 2016

Personal information
- Full name: Esteban Andrés Pavez Suazo
- Date of birth: 1 May 1990 (age 36)
- Place of birth: Santiago, Chile
- Height: 1.80 m (5 ft 11 in)
- Position: Midfielder

Team information
- Current team: Alianza Lima
- Number: 5

Youth career
- 2004–2007: Cobreloa
- 2007–2008: Colo-Colo

Senior career*
Years	Team	Apps	(Gls)
2009–2017	Colo-Colo	131	(9)
2010	Colo-Colo (futsal)	–	(–)
2010	→ Rangers (loan)	2	(0)
2011	→ San Marcos (loan)	29	(1)
2012	→ Unión Temuco (loan)	30	(1)
2013	Colo-Colo B	2	(0)
2017–2018	Athletico Paranaense	28	(0)
2018–2019	Colo-Colo	26	(3)
2019–2020	Al-Nasr	18	(2)
2020–2021	Tijuana	32	(0)
2022–2025	Colo-Colo	98	(3)
2026–	Alianza Lima	13	(1)

International career^{‡}
2005	Chile U15	1	(0)
2007	Chile U17	2	(0)
2010	Chile U20 (futsal)		
2014–2025	Chile	17	(0)
- * Club domestic league appearances and goals as of 25 May 2026 ‡ National team caps and goals as of 25 March 2025

Esteban Andrés Pavez Suazo (Note: In this Spanish name, the first or paternal surname is Pavez and the second or maternal family name is Suazo.) (born 1 May 1990), known as just Esteban Pavez (Latin American Spanish: [esˈteβam paˈβes]), (Note: In isolation, Esteban is pronounced [esˈteβan].) is a Chilean professional footballer who plays as a midfielder for Peruvian Primera División club Alianza Lima.

== Club career ==
Ended his contract with Colo-Colo, Pavez moved to Peru and joined Primera División club Alianza Lima on 29 January 2026. They won the 2026 Torneo Apertura.

=== Futsal ===
In 2010, Pavez played for the Colo-Colo futsal team and represented Chile in the South American U20 Championship.

== International career ==
Pavez was part of a Chile under-25 squad in a training session led by Claudio Borghi in May 2011, alongside his teammates in San Marcos de Arica, Elías Hartard and Claudio Calderón.

At senior level, he made his debut in a 4–0 win against Costa Rica on 22 January 2014.

== Career statistics ==
=== International ===
As of match played 25 March 2025.

Appearances and goals by national team and year
National team	Year	Apps	Goals
Chile	2014	1	0
Chile	2017	2	0
Chile	2019	5	0
Chile	2022	3	0
Chile	2024	5	0
Chile	2025	1	0
Total		17	0

== Honours ==
Colo-Colo

- Chilean Primera División (5): 2009–C, 2014–C, 2015–A, 2022, 2024
- Copa Chile (2): 2016, 2023
- Supercopa de Chile (2): 2022, 2024

Athletico Paranaense

- Campeonato Paranaense: 2018
- Copa Sudamericana: 2018

Al-Nasr

- UAE League Cup: 2019–20

Alianza Lima

- Peruvian Primera División: 2026 Apertura

Chile

- China Cup: 2017

Individual

- Chilean Primera División Ideal Team: 2022, 2024
