= Freddy Ferragut =

Chilean footballer (born 1974)

Personal information
- Full name: Freddy Alexander Ferragut González
- Date of birth: 2 September 1974 (age 52)
- Place of birth: Santiago, Chile
- Height: 1.78 m (5 ft 10 in)
- Position: Winger

Team information
- Current team: Unión Española (women) (manager)

Youth career
- Barrabases
- Colo-Colo

Senior career*
| Years | Team | Apps | (Gls) |
| 1991–1996 | Colo-Colo | | |
| 1993 | → Magallanes (loan) | | |
| 1996 | → Santiago Wanderers (loan) | | |
| 1996–1999 | Real Zacatecas | | |
| 1999 | Colo-Colo | 4 | (0) |
| 200? | Aguaje Soccer | | |
| 2005 | Deportes Melipilla | 12 | (1) |

International career
| 1991 | Chile U17 | | |
| 1992–1993 | Chile U20 | | |
| 1995 | Chile U23 | | |

Managerial career
- 2017: Municipal Santiago
- 2017–2018: Deportivo Pilmahue
- 2018–2019: San Antonio Unido
- 2019–2020: San Antonio Unido (youth)
- 2021: Deportivo Pilmahue
- 2024–2025: Andrés Bello University (women)
- 2025: Santiago Morning (women) (youth)
- 2026: Deportes Recoleta (women)
- 2026–: Unión Española (women)
- * Club domestic league appearances and goals

Freddy Alexander Ferragut González (born 2 September 1974) is a Chilean former professional footballer who played as a midfielder and current manager. He is currently in charge of Unión Española (women).

== Club career ==
A product of Colo-Colo youth system, he made his debut in 1991 at the age of 17. He was loaned to Magallanes and Santiago Wanderers in 1993 and 1996 respectively. Next, he had a step with Mexican club Real Sociedad de Zacatecas, where he promoted the signing of the Chilean player Victor Mella with the club.

He returned to Colo-Colo in 1999 and next he moved to the United States to play for amateur clubs. His last club was Deportes Melipilla in 2005, where he made 12 appearances and scored one goal.

== International career ==
Ferragut represented Chile at under-17 level in the 1991 South American Championship and at under-20 level in both the 1992 South American Championship and the 1993 L'Alcúdia Tournament, becoming the MVP player.

At under-23 level, he took part of the Chile squad in the 1995 Pan American Games.

== Coaching career ==
Parallel to his last days as a football player and following his retirement, since 2003 he has worked as coach in American soccer academies such as Stanford Soccer Club, Burlingame Soccer Club, Gunn High School and Woodside Soccer Club.

In 2017 he began to work in his native country by joining Municipal Santiago in the Tercera B, moving to Deportivo Pilmahue in the same season. He returned to Pilmahue in 2021. From 2018 to 2019 he was the coach of San Antonio Unido in the Segunda División Profesional.

As a coach of women's teams, Ferragut was appointed as manager of Deportes Recoleta in the Chilean top level in December 2025. The next month, he switched to Unión Española.

== Honours ==
=== Player ===
Colo-Colo

- Chilean Primera División: 1994

Individual

- L'Alcúdia International Tournament MVP: 1993
