= Camila Pavez =

Chilean footballer

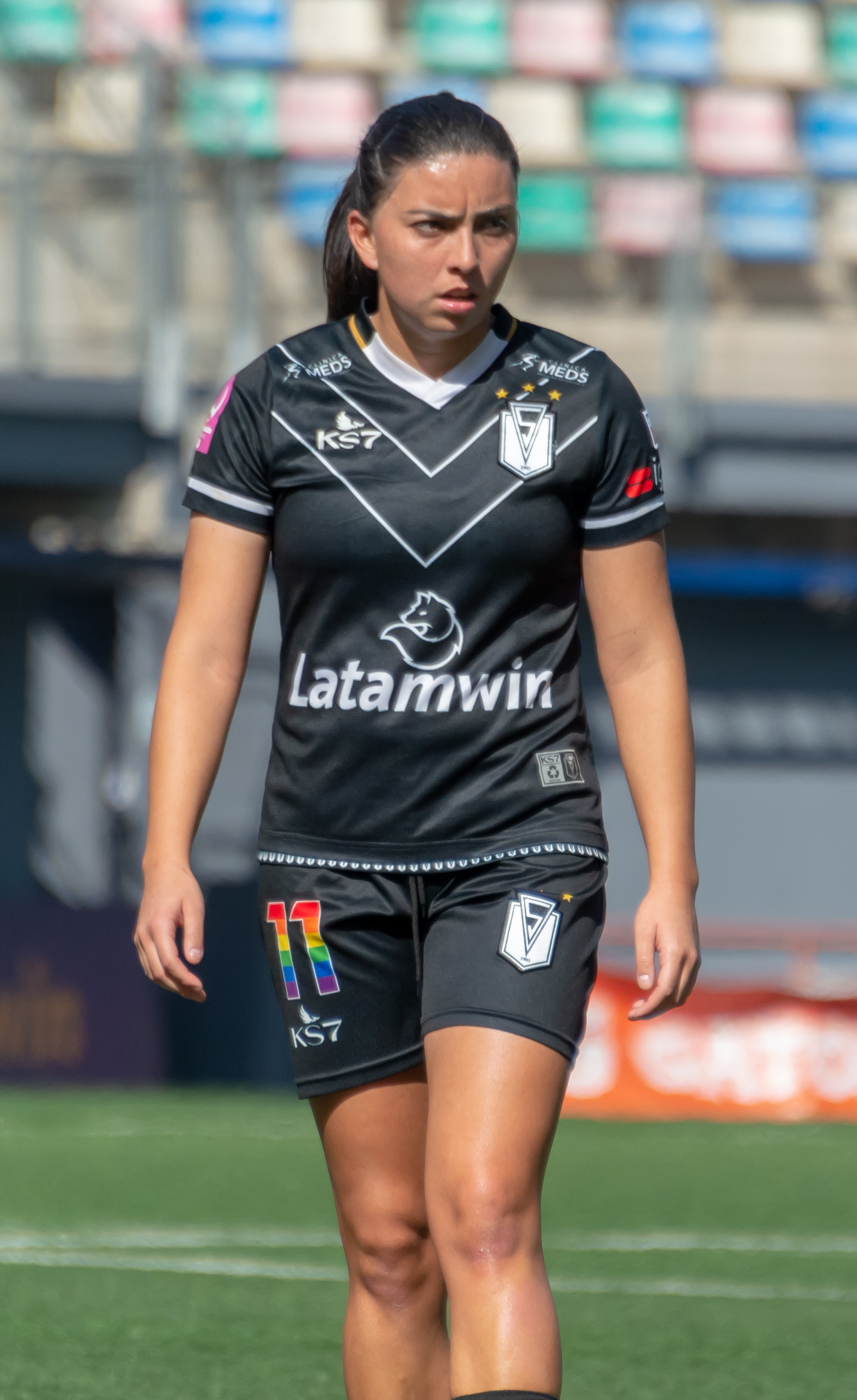
- Pavez with Santiago Morning in 2023

Personal information
- Full name: Camila Alejandra Pavez Vásquez
- Date of birth: 8 February 2000 (age 26)
- Place of birth: Machalí, Chile
- Position: Forward

Team information
- Current team: Universidad de Concepción

Youth career
- Villa El Guindal
- Machalí (city team)

Senior career*
Years	Team	Apps	(Gls)
2012–2018	Cobresal		
2019	Universidad de Concepción	10	(13)
2019–2020	River Plate		
2020–2022	Lanús		
2022–2023	San Lorenzo		
2023–2024	Santiago Morning		
2025	Universidad de Chile	23	(4)
2026–	Universidad de Concepción	0	(0)

International career
2019–2020	Chile U20	4	(0)
- * Club domestic league appearances and goals

Camila Alejandra Pavez Vásquez (born 8 February 2000) is a Chilean footballer who plays as a forward for Universidad de Concepción.

== Club career ==
As a youth player, Pavez started her career with club Villa El Guindal alongside male players. Subsequently, she played for the Machalí city team.

At the age of twelve, she joined Cobresal, making her official debut in the same year. In 2019, she switched to Universidad de Concepción, scoring thirteen goals in ten matches.

In December 2019, she moved to Argentina and joined River Plate, being nicknamed La Matadora (The Bullfighter), after the historical Chilean player of the club Marcelo Salas. In the Argentine top division, she also played for Lanús and San Lorenzo.

In 2023, Pavez returned to her homeland by signing with Santiago Morning. In 2025, she switched to Universidad de Chile.

On 1 January 2026, Pavez returned to Universidad de Concepción after her stint in 2019.

== International career ==
At the age of twelve, she was called up to the Chile national team, coinciding with Christiane Endler, but she did not make an appearance.

In 2019 and 2020, she represented Chile U20 in the CONMEBOL South American League and the South American Championship, respectively.

In 2023, she was called up to training microcycles of the national team at under-23 level.

== Personal life ==
Her father was in charge of taking O'Higgins players to the training fields.

Her cousin, Tamara Iturriaga, is a former goalkeeper of Cobresal.
