= Ámbar Soruco =

Chilean footballer (born 1996)

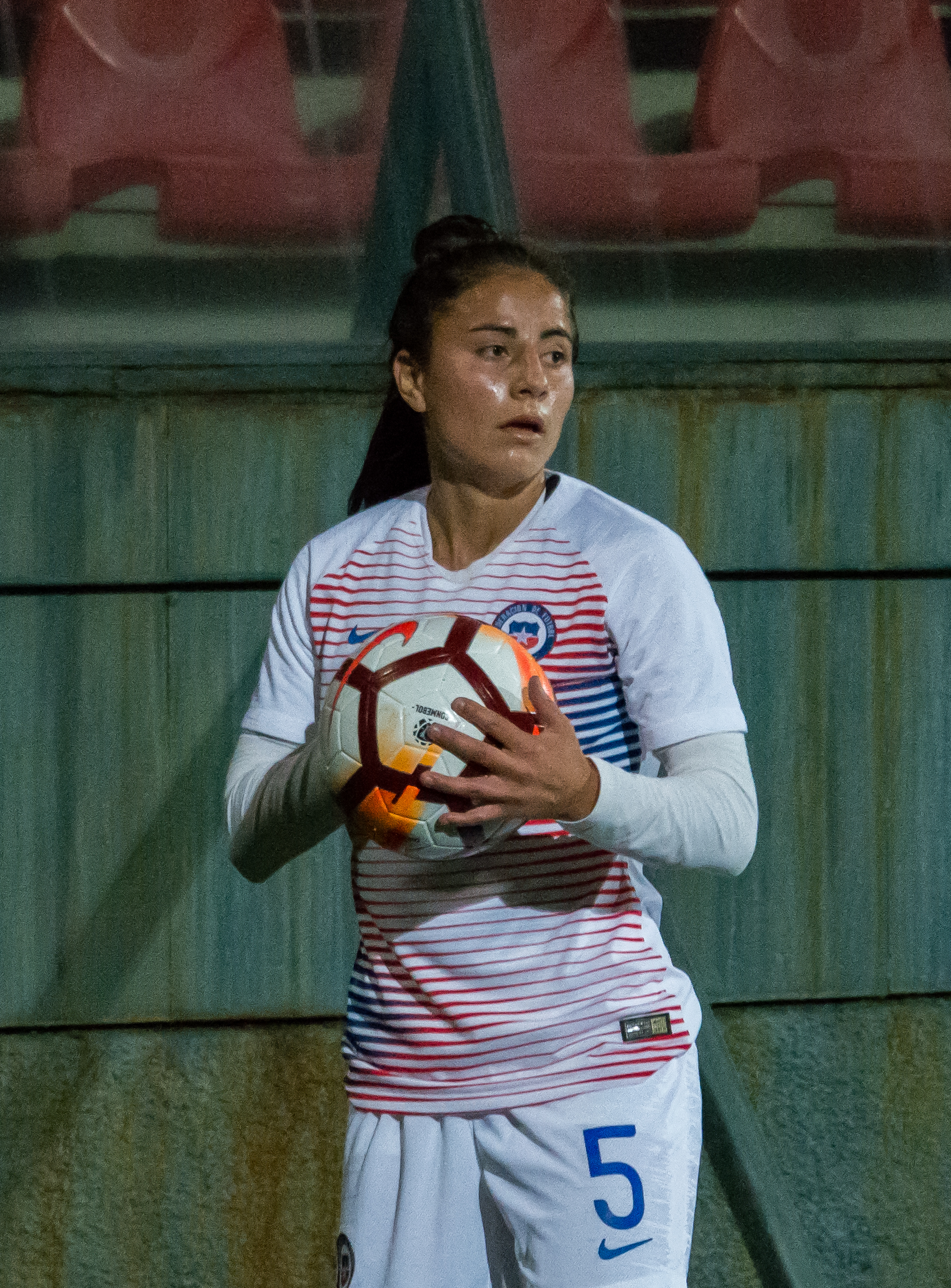
- Soruco with Chile in 2018

Personal information
- Full name: Ámbar Andrea Soruco Córdova
- Date of birth: 3 March 1996 (age 30)
- Place of birth: Viña del Mar, Chile
- Height: 1.55 m (5 ft 1 in)
- Position: Right-back

Team information
- Current team: Universidad Católica

Senior career*
Years	Team	Apps	(Gls)
2014	Everton		
2015–2018	Universidad de Chile		
2017	→ Abu Dhabi SC (loan)		
2018	3B de Amazônia		
2018–2019	Logroño	14	(0)
2020–2024	Santiago Morning		
2025	Unión Española	6	(1)
2026–	Universidad Católica		

International career^{‡}
2018–	Chile	4	(0)
- * Club domestic league appearances and goals as of 24 December 2025 ‡ National team caps and goals as of 9 April 2019

Ámbar Andrea Soruco Córdova (born 3 March 1996) is a Chilean footballer who plays as a right-back for Universidad Católica.

== Club career ==
As a player of Universidad de Chile, Soruco had a stint with Emirati club Abu Dhabi SC alongside her fellows Sofía Hartard and Fernanda Araya.

Soruco played for Spanish club EDF Logroño in the 2018–2019 Primera División season.

Soruco spent five seasons with Santiago Morning from 2020 to 2024.

Soruco joined Universidad Católica from Unión Española for the 2026 season.
