= Carlos Véliz (football manager) =

Chilean football manager

Personal information
- Full name: Carlos Alberto Véliz Schmauck
- Date of birth: 7 September 1986 (age 40)
- Place of birth: Santiago, Chile

Team information
- Current team: Universitario (women) (manager)

Managerial career
- Years: Team
- 2016–2019: Colo-Colo (women)
- 2016–2019: Colo-Colo (women) (youth)
- 2018–2019: Colo-Colo (futsal)
- 2019: AD Oliveirense (assistant)
- 2020–2022: Universidad de Chile (women)
- 2020–2022: Universidad de Chile (women) U17
- 2024: San Antonio Unido (assistant)
- 2025: Comunal Cabrero
- 2026–: Universitario (women)

Carlos Alberto Véliz Schmauck (born 7 September 1986) is a Chilean football and futsal manager. He is currently in charge of Peruvian club Universitario (women).

== Career ==
Véliz began his career with the Colo-Colo women's team in 2016, replacing José Letelier. At the same time, he assumed as coach of both the under-17 and the under-15 teams. As coach of the women's youth teams, he won three titles in 2017, two with the under-17 team and one with the under-15 team. He also led the futsal team, getting promotion to the top level.

At international level, he reached the 2017 Copa Libertadores final, losing on penalties against Audax/Corinthians.

In July 2019, he left Colo-Colo and emigrated to Portugal, joining AD Oliveirense as the assistant of the Spanish manager Manuel Crespo, who had been the head of the Colo-Colo youth system. They both left the club in September of the same year due to unpaid wages.

At the end of 2019, Véliz tried to rejoin Colo-Colo. However, the next year he assumed as the head coach of the Universidad de Chile women's team as well as the women's youth team. He won the 2021 league title, the second for the women's team.

In January 2023, he was released from Universidad de Chile after reaching three national championship finals, winning one of them, and taking part in three Copa Libertadores' editions, being replaced by his assistant, Nicolás Bravo.

In 2025, Véliz took charge of Comunal Cabrero in the Tercera A de Chile.

In December 2025, Véliz assumed as manager of Peruvian club Universitario women's team.

== Other works ==
He also has worked for a footballers agency.

Previous to involve in football, he worked for the Investigations Police of Chile (PDI).

== Honours ==
Colo-Colo (women)

- Campeonato Nacional (3): 2016 Clausura, 2017 Apertura, 2017 Clausura
- Copa de Campeones (1): 2016

Colo-Colo (women) U17

- Campeonato Nacional Sub-17 (2): 2017 Apertura, 2017 Clausura

Colo-Colo (women) U15

- Campeonato Femenino Sub-15 (1): 2017 Clausura

Universidad de Chile (women)

- Campeonato Nacional (1): 2021

Individual

- Premios Contragolpe - Best Manager: 2021
