= Melissa Bustos =

Chilean footballer (born 1999)

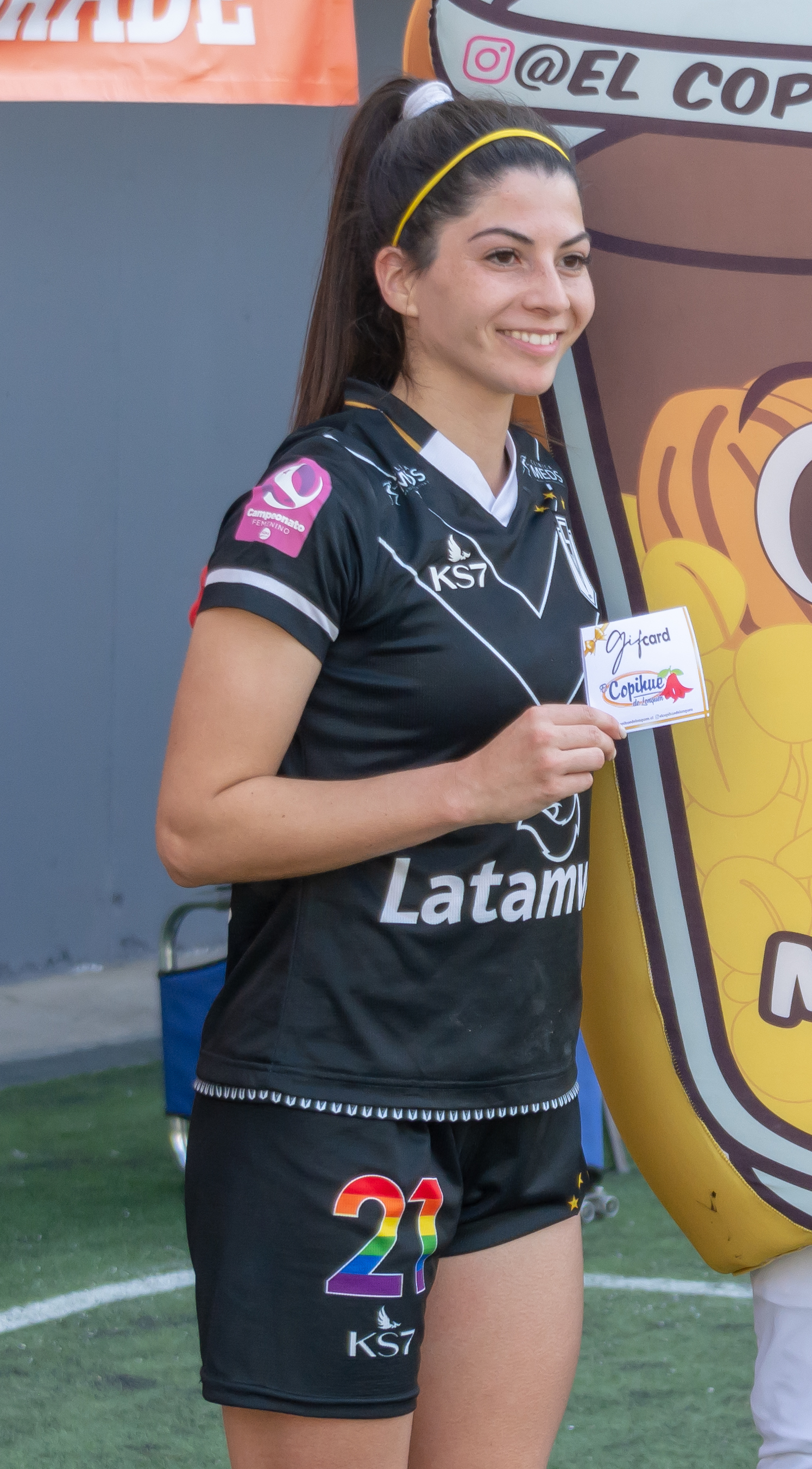
- Bustos with Santiago Morning in 2023

Personal information
- Full name: Melissa Deanna Bustos Pepe
- Birth name: Melissa Deanna Bustos
- Date of birth: 12 May 1999 (age 27)
- Place of birth: Winnipeg, Manitoba, Canada
- Height: 1.63 m (5 ft 4 in)
- Position: Attacking midfielder

Team information
- Current team: Everton

College career
Years	Team	Apps	(Gls)
2017–2019	UBC Thunderbirds		

Senior career*
Years	Team	Apps	(Gls)
2020	Colo-Colo		
2021–2022	Fernández Vial		
2023	Santiago Morning		
2024	Universidad de Chile		
2025–	Everton		

International career^{‡}
2023–	Chile	2	(0)
- * Club domestic league appearances and goals ‡ National team caps and goals as of 5 December 2023

Melissa Deanna Bustos Pepe (born 12 May 1999) is a footballer who plays as an attacking midfielder for Chilean club Everton. Born in Canada, she plays for the Chile women's national team.

== Club career ==
In her country of birth, Bustos played for two consecutive years for UBC Thunderbirds. In 2019, she suffered a serious knee injury. In 2020, she moved to Chile and joined Colo-Colo.

After playing for Colo-Colo, she spent two years with Fernández Vial.

In May 2022, she was selected by the Brazilian international Neymar Jr. for the friendly tournament Red Bull Neymar Jr's Five in Qatar, after he watched her football skills in an Instagram video.

In 2023, Bustos signed with Santiago Morning. In 2024, she switched to Universidad de Chile. The next year, she joined Everton de Viña del Mar.

== International career ==
In 2019, she trained with the Chile national team and, later, she was called up to a training microcycle.

In 2023, she was called up to a training microcycle of the national team at under-23 level.

At senior level, she made her debut in a 1–0 win against Peru on 1 December 2023.

== Personal life ==
Born in Canada, her father, Alex, is Chilean and her mother is Canadian of Italian descent. She holds three nationalities: Canadian by birth and both Chilean and Italian by descent.

Her father used to organize soccer championships for academies when she was a child. As a child, she also played volleyball, basketball and did track and field.

Her older brother, Marco, is a Canada international footballer. They both organized a soccer camp, Marco & Melissa Bustos Soccer Camp, in their hometown, Winnipeg, and gave Fernández Vial shirts to the children.
