= Parcko Quiroz =

Chilean footballer

Personal information
- Full name: Parcko Geovanni Quiroz Figueroa
- Date of birth: 21 April 1968 (age 58)
- Place of birth: Papudo, Chile
- Height: 1.78 m (5 ft 10 in)
- Position: Defender

Youth career
- Universidad Católica
- Colo-Colo

Senior career*
Years	Team	Apps	(Gls)
1984–1989	Colo-Colo	2	(0)
1988	→ Alianza Lima (loan)	8	(0)
1988	→ Naval (loan)	1	(0)
1989	→ Cobreandino (loan)		(9)
1990–1992	Alianza Lima		
1992	Ovación Sipesa		
1993	Deportivo Sipesa		
1993	→ José Gálvez (loan)	1	(0)
1993	Cienciano		
1994–1995	Alianza Lima		
1995	Deportivo Flecha		
1996	Deportes Arica	26	(4)
1997	Magallanes		
- * Club domestic league appearances and goals

Parcko Geovanni Quiroz Figueroa (born 21 April 1968) is a Chilean former professional footballer who played as a defender for clubs in Chile and Peru.

== Career ==
Born in Papudo, Chile, Quiroz was with Universidad Católica before joining the Colo-Colo youth system. He took part of the first team since 1984. In December 1987, he was loaned to Alianza Lima for the 1988 season, on a deal for three months, after the tragic plane crash that suffered the Peruvian squad, alongside his fellows José Letelier, Francisco Huerta and René Pinto. He and his fellows made their debut against Coronel Bolognesi on 3 January 1988.

After stints with Naval de Talcahuano (1988), and Cobreandino (1989), he returned to Peru and played for Alianza Lima, José Gálvez, Ovación Sipesa, later Deportivo Sipesa, and Cienciano. As a member of Ovación Sipesa, he won the 1992 Torneo Zonal and got promotion to the top level,

In 1996, he played for Deportes Arica in the Primera B de Chile.

== After football ==
Following his retirement, Quiroz stayed in Peru and developed a coaching career in clubs based in provinces, such as El Tumi from Tarapoto. He returned to his city of birth in 2010 and has gone on playing football at amateur level in clubs such as Unión Lo Franco as wells as serving as coach at sports workshops for the Municipality of Papudo.

== Honours ==
- Torneo Zonal: 1992
