= Elías Hartard =

Chilean footballer (born 1987)

Personal information
- Full name: Elías Víctor Hartard Ojeda
- Date of birth: 18 May 1987 (age 39)
- Place of birth: Madrid, Spain
- Height: 1.85 m (6 ft 1 in)
- Position: Goalkeeper

Team information
- Current team: Rodelindo Román

Youth career
- Universidad Católica

Senior career*
Years	Team	Apps	(Gls)
2007–2011	San Marcos	11	(0)
2010	→ Santiago Morning (loan)	0	(0)
2012	Everton	0	(0)
2013	San Luis	9	(0)
2013–2014	Deportes Copiapó	7	(0)
2014–2018	Deportes La Serena	96	(0)
2019	Santiago Wanderers	0	(0)
2020–2021	Iberia	22	(0)
2022–2023	Deportes Temuco	3	(0)
2024	Deportes La Serena	0	(0)
2025	Real San Joaquín	11	(0)
2026–	Rodelindo Román	–	(–)
- * Club domestic league appearances and goals as of 24 March 2026

Elías Víctor Hartard Ojeda (born 18 May 1987) is a Spanish-born Chilean footballer who plays as a goalkeeper for Rodelindo Román.

== Career ==
A product of the Universidad Católica youth system, Hartard tried to signed with Spanish side Rayo Vallecano after leaving them.

In 2024, Hartard rejoined Deportes La Serena after playing for them from 2014 to 2018. The next year, he switched to Real San Joaquín.

On 23 January 2026, Hartard joined Rodelindo Román.

Hartard was part of a Chile under-25 squad in a training session led by Claudio Borghi in May 2011, alongside his teammates in San Marcos de Arica, Claudio Calderón and Esteban Pavez.

== Personal life ==
Hartard was born in Madrid, Spain, to Chilean parents who were exiled after the 1973 Chilean coup d'état. He holds dual Spanish-Chilean nationality.

Hartard is the brother of the Chilean football midfielder Sofía Hartard.

== Honours ==
Santiago Wanderers

- Primera B de Chile (1): 2019
