= José Letelier =

Chilean footballer and manager (born 1966)

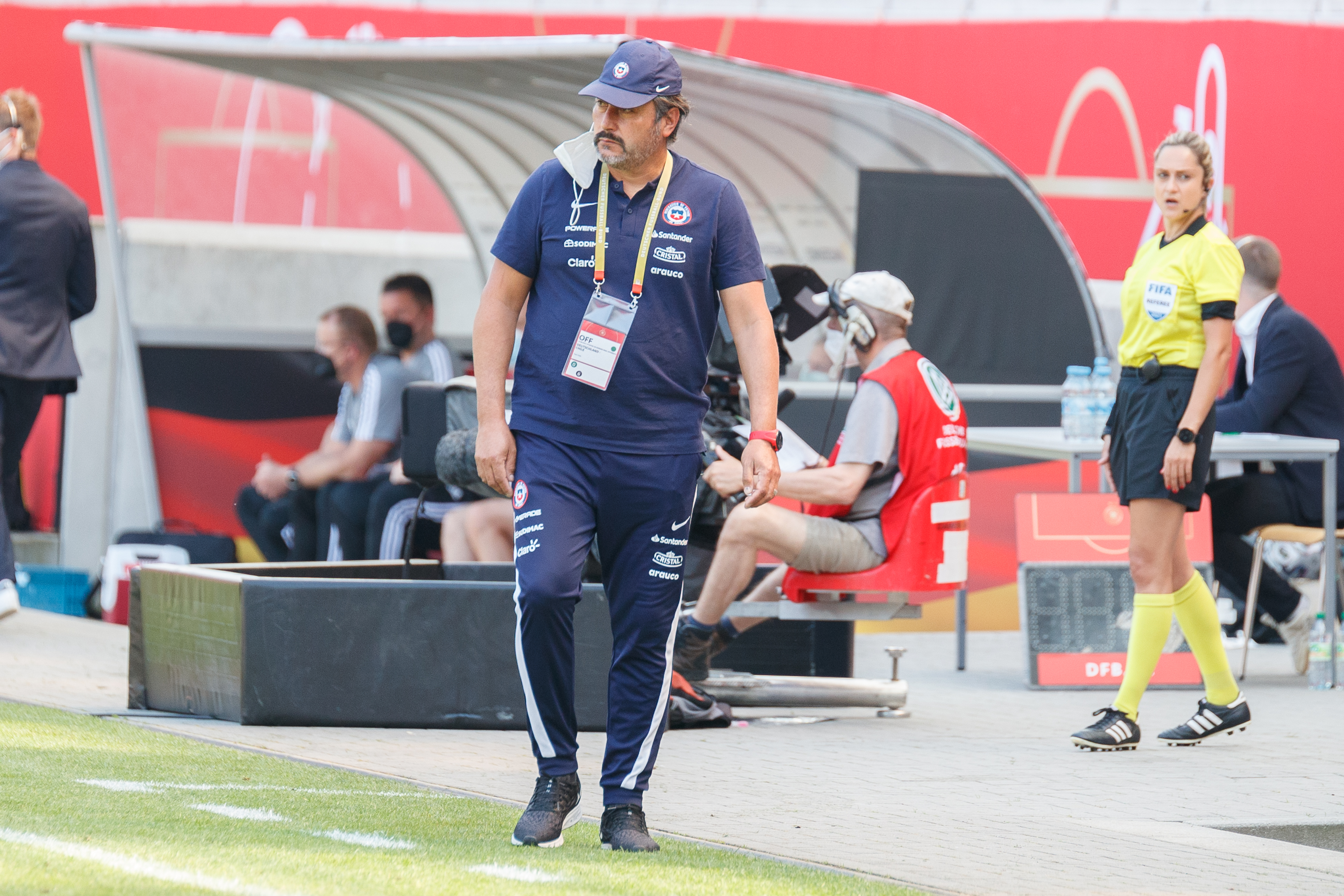
- Letelier as coach of Chile in 2021

Personal information
- Full name: José Antonio Letelier Henríquez
- Date of birth: 23 May 1966 (age 60)
- Place of birth: Santiago, Chile
- Position: Goalkeeper

Team information
- Current team: Alianza Lima (women) (manager)

Youth career
- 1979–1982: Universidad de Chile
- 1983–1986: Colo-Colo

Senior career*
Years	Team	Apps	(Gls)
1987–1991	Colo-Colo		
1988	→ Alianza Lima (loan)		
1989	→ Deportes Valdivia (loan)		
1991–1992	Atlético Morelia		
1993	Huachipato		
1994–1995	Deportes Linares		
1996	Municipal Las Condes		
1997–1999	Deportes Linares		

Managerial career
- Colo-Colo (youth)
- 2010–2015: Colo-Colo (women)
- 2015–2023: Chile (women)
- 2015: Chile U20 (women)
- 2016: Chile U17 (women)
- 2023–: Alianza Lima (women)
- * Club domestic league appearances and goals

José Antonio Letelier Henríquez (born 23 May 1966) is a Chilean football coach and former professional goalkeeper. He was the head coach of the Chile women's national football team from 2015 to 2023. He is currently in charge of Peruvian side Alianza Lima (women).

== Playing career ==
Letelier started playing in the youth categories of Universidad de Chile, before switching to rivals Colo-Colo where he was taken on as a professional in 1987. In 1988 Colo-Colo sent Letelier and three other young players – Francisco Huerta, Parcko Quiroz and René Pinto – on loan to Alianza Lima, whose team had perished in the 1987 Alianza Lima plane crash. After a further loan at Deportes Valdivia, he returned to Colo-Colo and understudied Daniel Morón and Marcelo Ramírez in the club's 1991 Copa Libertadores-winning squad.

He was signed by Mexican club Atlético Morelia, where he played in 1991 and 1992, coinciding with his compatriot Juan Gutiérrez. He then completed his career back in Chile, with stints at Huachipato and Deportes Linares.

== Coaching career ==
After retiring as a player, Letelier trained as a PE teacher and obtained his coaching licences from the Instituto Nacional del Fútbol (INAF). He began coaching goalkeepers in Colo-Colo's boys' teams, then took charge of the club's women's section in 2010. He won the Chilean women's football championship ten times in succession, the last nine under the Apertura and Clausura format. When Colo-Colo won the 2012 Copa Libertadores Femenina, Letelier became the first individual to be part of winning squads in both the male and female Libertadores tournaments.

In June 2015 he was appointed technical director of the Chile women's national football team, with his first task to prepare an under 20 team for the 2015 South American U-20 Women's Championship. The next year, he also led the under-17's in the 2016 South American Championship. When the senior women's national team played their first fixture in three years in May 2017, they thrashed hapless Peru 12–0. At the 2018 Copa América Femenina, Letelier steered hosts Chile to a runners-up finish, securing qualification to their first ever FIFA Women's World Cup in 2019.

In October 2023, he assumed as the coach of the Alianza Lima women's team.

== Honours ==
=== Player ===
Colo-Colo

- Copa Digeder (1): 1990
- Chilean Primera División (1): 1990
- Copa Libertadores (1): 1991

=== Manager ===
Colo-Colo (women)

- Chilean Primera División Femenina (10): 2010, 2011 Apertura, 2011 Clausura, 2012 Apertura, 2012 Clausura, 2013 Apertura, 2013 Clausura, 2014 Apertura, 2014 Clausura, 2015 Apertura
- Copa Libertadores (1): 2012

Alianza Lima (women)

- Peruvian Primera División Femenina (2): 2024, 2025

Individual

- Peruvian Primera División Femenina Best manager: 2024, 2025
