= Josefina Keymer =

Chilean footballer (born 2000)

Personal information
- Full name: Josefina Paz Keymer Tohá
- Date of birth: 13 June 2000 (age 26)
- Place of birth: Las Condes, Santiago, Chile
- Height: 1.60 m (5 ft 3 in)
- Position: Midfielder

Youth career
- Boston College

Senior career*
Years	Team	Apps	(Gls)
2017–2018	Universidad de Chile		
2018–2019	Córdoba		
2019–2020	Sporting Gijón		
2020	Universidad Católica		
2021–2022	Santiago Morning		

International career
- Chile U17
2018–2020	Chile U20	1	(0)
- * Club domestic league appearances and goals

Josefina Paz Keymer Tohá (born 13 June 2000) is a Chilean footballer who plays as a midfielder. She last played for Santiago Morning.

== Club career ==
Born in Las Condes, Santiago, Chile, Keymer was with Boston College as a youth player. At senior level, she began her career with Universidad de Chile where she won the following tournaments:

- Apertura, 2015
- Apertura, 2016
- Clausura, 2016

In 2018, she emigrated to Spain and played for Córdoba and Sporting Gijón.

Back in Chile, she joined Universidad Católica in 2020. The next season, she switched to Santiago Morning, staying with them until the end of the 2022 season.

== International career ==
Keymer represented Chile U17 and, later, Chile U20 in both the 2018 and the 2020 South American Championship.

In March 2023, she joined Forming Futbol, an agency for female footballers.

== Personal life ==
Keymer attends the University of Chile to become an industrial engineer. She has done her internship at CAP.
