= Juan Gutiérrez (footballer, born 1964) =

Chilean footballer

Personal information
- Full name: Juan Guillermo Gutiérrez Acosta
- Date of birth: 21 June 1964 (age 62)
- Place of birth: Santiago, Chile
- Height: 1.70 m (5 ft 7 in)
- Position: Forward

Youth career
- 1977–1982: Colo-Colo

Senior career*
Years	Team	Apps	(Gls)
1982–1988	Colo-Colo	104	(13)
1989–1990	Unión Española	26	(3)
1990–1992	Morelia		
1993	Coquimbo Unido	1	(0)
1994	Audax Italiano	28	(9)

International career
1983	Chile U20		
- * Club domestic league appearances and goals

Juan Guillermo Gutiérrez Acosta (born 21 June 1964) is a Chilean former professional footballer who played as a forward for clubs in Chile and Mexico.

== Club career ==
Gutiérrez came to Colo-Colo youth system in 1977 and stayed with the club until 1988, winning the league titles in 1983 and 1985. He also won the Copa Chile in 1985 and 1988, scoring the winning goal in the last.

In the Chilean Primera División, he also played for Unión Española (1989–90), with whom he won the Copa de Invierno, and Coquimbo Unido (1993).

Abroad, Gutiérrez played for Mexican club Morelia from 1990 to 1992, where he coincided with his compatriot José Letelier.

His last club was Audax Italiano in the 1994 Segunda División de Chile.

== International career ==
He took part of Chile at under-20 level in a team coached by Carlos Campos.

== Post-retirement ==
Gutiérrez graduated as a PE teacher at the University of Chile, working after as football coach at both the Diego Portales University and the Alliance française.

He has worked as head of the youth systems of Colo-Colo (2002–08), Santiago Wanderers (2008–09) and Universidad de Chile (2011–12).

He also has served as sport manager of Colo-Colo (2012–15) and Santiago Wanderers (2015–16).

In 2018, he assumed as coach of the team of USACH.

== Honours ==
Colo-Colo

- Chilean Primera División: 1983, 1985
- Copa Chile: 1985, 1988

Unión Española

- Copa de Invierno: 1989
