= Ascenso Femenino =

- Founded: 2019
- Country: Chile
- Confederation: CONMEBOL
- Number of clubs: 21
- Level on pyramid: 2
- Promotion to: Liga Femenina de Chile
- Current champions: Huachipato (2024)
- Most championships: Huachipato (2 titles)
- Current: 2026 season

The Ascenso Femenino is the second division of women's football in Chile. The competition is organised by the Chilean Football Federation since 2019.

== List of champions ==
Ed.	Season	Champion	Runner-up
1	2019	Deportes Puerto Montt	Deportes La Serena
–	2020	Canceled due to the COVID-19 pandemic	
2	2021	Huachipato	O'Higgins
3	2022	Coquimbo Unido	Cobresal
4	2023	Everton	Unión Española
5	2024	Huachipato	Santiago Wanderers

== Titles by club ==
Club	Winners	Winning years
Huachipato	2	2021, 2024
Deportes Puerto Montt	1	2019
Coquimbo Unido	1	2022
Everton	1	2023
