= René Pinto (footballer) =

Chilean footballer (born 1965)

Personal information
- Full name: René Alfonso Pinto Cofré
- Date of birth: 18 May 1965 (age 61)
- Place of birth: Santiago, Chile
- Position: Forward

Youth career
- Colo-Colo

Senior career*
Years	Team	Apps	(Gls)
1985–1989	Colo-Colo	12	(2)
1987	→ Deportes Valdivia (loan)		
1988–1989	→ Alianza Lima (loan)		
1989	→ Everton (loan)	5	(0)
1990–1991	Alianza Lima		
1991	Deportes Linares		(1)
1992–1993	Audax Italiano		

International career
1987	Chile B		
Medal record
Men's football
Representing Chile
Pan American Games
Silver medal – second place	1987 Indianapolis	Team
- * Club domestic league appearances and goals

René Alfonso Pinto Cofré (born 18 May 1965) is a Chilean former football player who played as a forward for clubs in Chile and Peru.

== Club career ==
A product of Colo-Colo youth system, Pinto made his debut in the 1985 Copa Polla Gol. Then, he was loaned to Alianza Lima for the 1988 season after the tragic plane crash that suffered the Peruvian squad on 8 December 1987, alongside his fellows José Letelier, Parcko Quiroz and Francisco Huerta. The deal was for three months, but he stayed in Peru all the year. They made their debut against Coronel Bolognesi on 3 January 1988.

After a stint with Everton in 1989, he returned to Alianza Lima until 1991.

Back in Chile, he played for Deportes Linares and Audax Italiano. He retired at the age of 28.

== International career ==
Pinto represented Chile in the 1987 Pan American Games, winning the silver medal.

== After football ==
He graduated as both a PE teacher and a football manager. As a PE teacher, he has worked for schools and the Municipality of La Pintana.

He has continued on playing football at amateur level in clubs such as Azocenco.

He has kept a relationship with Alianza Lima in activities such as to visit them in pre-match meetings alongside others Chilean former footballers.

== Honours ==
Chile B

- Pan American Games Silver medal: 1987
