= Tatiele Silveira =

Brazilian footballer and manager

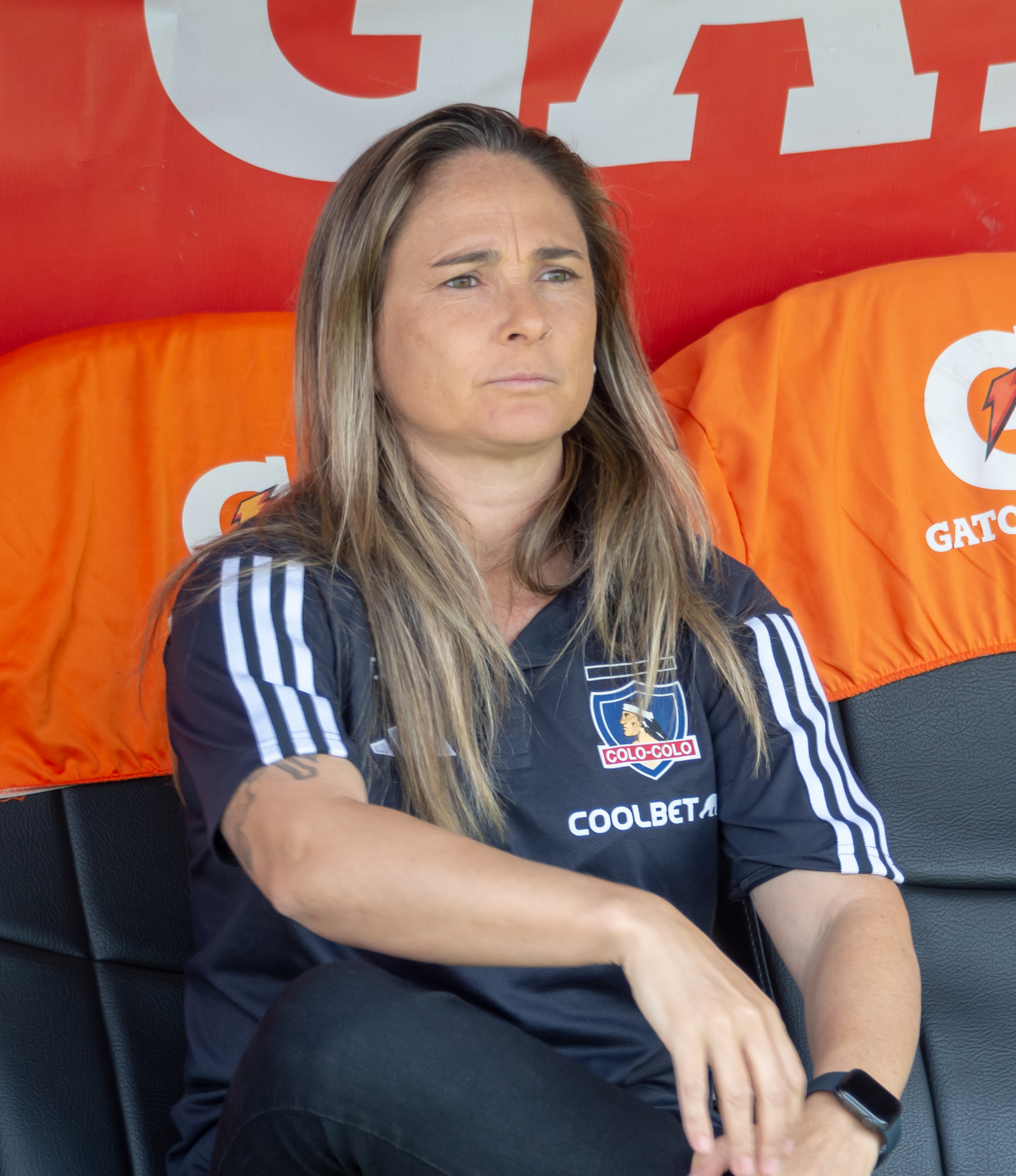

Personal information
- Full name: Tatiele dos Santos Silveira
- Date of birth: 13 July 1980 (age 46)
- Place of birth: Porto Alegre, Brazil
- Position: Midfielder

Team information
- Current team: Colo-Colo (manager)

Youth career
- 1993–1997: Internacional

Senior career*
Years	Team	Apps	(Gls)
1997–2003	Internacional		

Managerial career
- 2008–2009: Porto Alegre U17
- 2009–2011: Grêmio
- 2011: Canoas
- 2012: Guaíba
- 2012–2014: Grêmio
- 2016: Brazil U17 (assistant)
- 2017: Internacional U17
- 2017–2018: Internacional
- 2019–2020: Ferroviária
- 2021–2022: Santos
- 2023–: Colo-Colo
- * Club domestic league appearances and goals

Tatiane dos Santos Silveira (born 13 July 1980) is a Brazilian football manager and former player who played as a midfielder. She is currently the manager of Chilean side Colo-Colo.

== Career ==
Born in Porto Alegre, Rio Grande do Sul, Silveira was known as Tati during her playing days, and played as a senior for Internacional. She retired in 2003, and subsequently started coaching.

Silveira was in charge of Porto Alegre's under-17 team, Grêmio, Canoas and Guaíba before joining the Brazil under-17 national team in 2016, as an assistant coach. In 2017, she returned to her former side Internacional; initially in charge of the under-17s, she was subsequently named manager of the main squad.

Silveira left Inter in December 2018, despite losing only one match in the entire season, as her contract was due to expire. On 22 January 2019, she was appointed manager of Ferroviária.

In 2019, Silveira led the Guerreiras Grenás to the second Campeonato Brasileiro title of their history, and was also the first woman to win the trophy as manager. On 21 December 2020, she left the club after a reorganization in the women's football structure.

On 28 June 2021, Silveira was appointed manager of Santos, replacing Christiane Lessa. On 8 August of the following year, she was sacked.

In July 2023, she moved to Chile and signed with Colo-Colo.

== Honours ==
=== Manager ===
Ferroviária

- Campeonato Brasileiro de Futebol Feminino Série A1: 2019
