= Luciano Xavier =

Brazilian footballer

Personal information
- Full name: Luciano Xavier Lisboa
- Date of birth: July 23, 1987 (age 39)
- Place of birth: Paracatu, Brazil
- Height: 1.84 m (6 ft 0 in)
- Position: Defensive midfielder

Team information
- Current team: Cascavel-PN

Youth career
- 2005–2006: Atlético Mineiro

Senior career*
Years	Team	Apps	(Gls)
2007	Atlético Mineiro		
2007	→ CRB (loan)		
2008–2009	→ Ituiutaba (loan)		
2009–2010	NK Široki Brijeg		
2010	Boavista-RJ		
2011–	Cascavel-PN		

International career
2005	Brazil U-18		
- * Club domestic league appearances and goals

Luciano Xavier Lisboa often called Luciano was born on July 23, 1987, in Paracatu, and is a Brazilian defensive midfielder. He currently plays for Cascavel-PN.

Capped at Under-18 level for Brazil when made part of the team competing at the 2005 Sendai Cup.

== Contract ==
- Ituiutaba (Loan) 23 January 2008 to 4 May 2008
- Atlético Mineiro 1 July 2004 to 20 June 2009
