= Santiago Morning (women) =

Women's team of Chilean football club Universidad de Chile

- Full name: Club de Deportes Santiago Morning S.A.D.P.
- Nickname: "Bohemias"
- Founded: 2008
- Ground: Estadio Municipal de La Pintana, Santiago
- Capacity: 6,000
- Manager: Paula Navarro
- League: Campeonato Nacional Fútbol Femenino
- 2022: Campeonato Nacional Fútbol,
- Website: https://www.santiagomorning.cl/
Home colours	Away colours

Santiago Morning Femenino is a Chilean women's football club from La Pintana, Santiago representing Santiago Morning in the Campeonato Nacional Fútbol Femenino. It was founded in 2008.

Santiago Morning won their first title in the 2018 Championship.

== Honours ==
=== Domestic ===
- Campeonato Nacional Fútbol Femenino:
  - Winners (3): 2018, 2019, 2020,

== Players ==
=== Current squad ===
As of 23 September 2023.

Note: Flags indicate national team as defined under FIFA eligibility rules; some limited exceptions apply. Players may hold more than one non-FIFA nationality.

No.	Pos.	Nation	Player
2	DF	CHI	Monserrat Hernández
4	DF	CHI	Bárbara Muñoz
6	MF	CHI	Sofía Hartard
7	FW	CHI	Mary Valencia
14	MF	CHI	Daniela Pardo
15	DF	CHI	Su Helen Galaz
17	DF	CHI	Marcela Pérez
18	FW	CHI	Valentina Navarrete
20	DF	CHI	Ámbar Soruco

No.	Pos.	Nation	Player
-	MF	USA	Amanda Morris
-	DF	CHI	Josefina Keymer
-	MF	CHI	Melissa Bustos
-	FW	CHI	Camila Pavez
-	GK	CHI	Fernanda Cárdenas
-	MF	CHI	Martina Yévenes
-	DF	CHI	Naiara Kapstein
-	FW	CHI	Ámbar Figueroa
