= Liga Femenina de Chile =

Football league in Chile

- Founded: 1999 (as women's championship); 2008 (as Campeonato Nacional Fútbol Femenino)
- Country: Chile
- Confederation: CONMEBOL
- Number of clubs: 14
- Level on pyramid: 1
- Relegation to: Ascenso Femenino
- International cup: Copa Libertadores
- Current champions: Colo Colo (2025)
- Most championships: Colo Colo (17)
- Top scorer: Yenny Acuña (120 goals)
- Current: 2026 season

The Liga Femenina de Chile is the main league competition for women's football in Chile. The winner qualifies for the Copa Libertadores de Fútbol Femenino, the South American Champions League. The competition is organised by the Chilean Football Federation.

Titles before 2008 were unofficial, as Universidad de Chile is credited with the first title in 2016.

- 1999: Universidad de Chile
- 2000: Universidad de Chile
- 2001: Universidad de Chile
- 2002: Santiago Morning
- 2005: Universidad de Chile

Since 2008, the league has been turned to semi-professionalism in order to improve women's football standard in the competition, with the name change and the establishment of a part-time fund for the team. In March 2022, the league will turn to full-time professional, ending a decade of semi-professional status of Chilean female players, starting from 2023 season.

== Format ==
The Apertura and Clausura format is used, thus there are two champions per year. Apertura starts early in the year, Clausura starts mid year and ends in December. As of 2013 about 20 teams play in two divisions, a Southern one and a Central one. They play a single round-robin tournament. After that the top four teams advance to the quarter-finals. Since 2014 the final is played in only one match, as the other knock-out matches, before that the final was two-legged. If different teams win the Apertura and Clausura there is a play-off for the Copa Libertadores spot.

== 2026 teams ==
Team	City
Colo Colo	Santiago (Macul)
Coquimbo Unido	Coquimbo
Deportes Iquique	Iquique
Deportes Recoleta	Santiago (Recoleta)
Deportes Temuco	Temuco
Huachipato	Talcahuano
Magallanes	Santiago (San Bernardo)
Palestino	Santiago (La Cisterna)
Santiago Wanderers	Valparaíso
Unión Española	Santiago (Independencia)
Universidad Católica	Santiago (Las Condes)
Universidad de Chile	Santiago (Ñuñoa)
Universidad de Concepción	Concepción

== List of champions ==
Below is the list of champions. In 2011 an Apertura and Clausura format was introduced.

- (In bracket, title count):

Ed.	Season	Champion	Runner-up	Winning manager
1	2008	Everton (1)	Universidad de Chile	(Chile) Mario Vera
2	2009	Everton (2)	Coquimbo Unido	(Chile) Mario Vera
3	2010	Colo-Colo (1)	Everton	(Chile) José Letelier
4	2011 Apertura	Colo-Colo (2)	Everton	(Chile) José Letelier
5	2011 Clausura	Colo-Colo (3)	Everton	(Chile) José Letelier
6	2012 Apertura	Colo-Colo (4)	Everton	(Chile) José Letelier
7	2012 Clausura	Colo-Colo (5)	Everton	(Chile) José Letelier
8	2013 Apertura	Colo-Colo (6)	Everton	(Chile) José Letelier
9	2013 Clausura	Colo-Colo (7)	Santiago Wanderers	(Chile) José Letelier
10	2014 Apertura	Colo-Colo (8)	Santiago Morning	(Chile) José Letelier
11	2014 Clausura	Colo-Colo (9)	Santiago Morning	(Chile) José Letelier
12	2015 Apertura	Colo-Colo (10)	Universidad de Chile	(Chile) José Letelier
13	2015 Clausura	Palestino (1)	Colo-Colo	(Chile) Claudio Quintiliani
14	2016 Apertura	Universidad de Chile (1)	Palestino	(Chile) Andrés Aguayo
15	2016 Clausura	Colo-Colo (11)	Santiago Morning	(Chile) Carlos Véliz
16	2017 Apertura	Colo-Colo (12)	Palestino	(Chile) Carlos Véliz
17	2017 Clausura	Colo-Colo (13)	Santiago Morning	(Chile) Carlos Véliz
18	2018	Santiago Morning (1)	Palestino	(Chile) Paula Navarro
19	2019	Santiago Morning (2)	Colo-Colo	(Chile) Paula Navarro
20	2020 Transición	Santiago Morning (3)	Universidad de Chile	(Chile) Paula Navarro
21	2021	Universidad de Chile (2)	Santiago Morning	(Chile) Carlos Véliz
22	2022	Colo-Colo (14)	Universidad de Chile	(Chile) Luis Mena
23	2023	Colo-Colo (15)	Santiago Morning	(Brazil) Tatiele Silveira
24	2024	Colo-Colo (16)	Universidad de Chile	(Brazil) Tatiele Silveira
25	2025	Colo-Colo (17)	Universidad de Chile	(Brazil) Tatiele Silveira

== Titles by club ==
Rank	Club	Winners	Runners-up	Winning years	Runners-up years
1	Colo-Colo	17	2	2010, 2011 Apertura, 2011 Clausura, 2012 Apertura, 2012 Clausura, 2013 Apertura, 2013 Clausura, 2014 Apertura, 2014 Clausura, 2015 Apertura, 2016 Clausura, 2017 Apertura, 2017 Clausura, 2022, 2023, 2024, 2025	2015 Clausura, 2019
2	Santiago Morning	3	6	2018, 2019, 2020 Transición	2014 Apertura, 2014 Clausura, 2016 Clausura, 2017 Clausura, 2021, 2023
3	Everton	2	6	2008, 2009	2010, 2011 Apertura, 2011 Clausura, 2012 Apertura, 2012 Clausura, 2013 Apertura
3	Universidad de Chile	2	6	2016 Apertura, 2021	2008, 2015 Apertura, 2020 Transición, 2022, 2024, 2025
4	Palestino	1	3	2015 Clausura	2016 Apertura, 2017 Apertura, 2018

== Half-year / Short tournaments ==
=== Super 4 seasons ===
Season	Champion	Runner-up	Third place
2008	Universidad de Chile (1)	Araucanía Temuco	Municipal Iquique
